= Buechberg =

Hill in the Swiss cantons of Schwyz and St. Gallen

- Buchberg
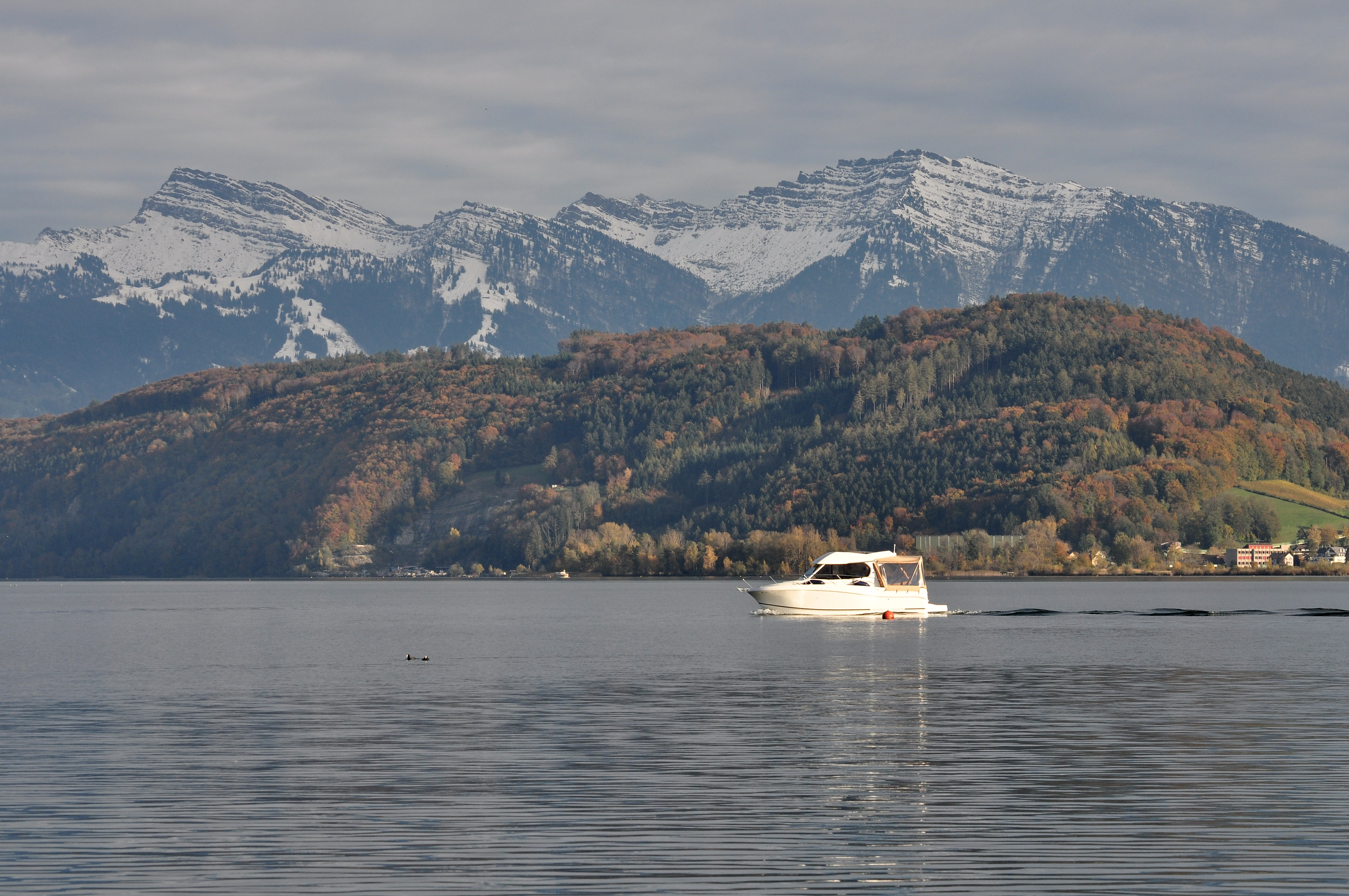
- Buechberg and Obersee, as seen from the Jona river in Rapperswil-Jona (Background: Speer, Chüemettler, Federispitz)

Highest point
- Elevation: 631 m (2,070 ft)
- Prominence: 202 m (663 ft)
- Coordinates: 47°12′5″N 8°54′32″E

Geography
- Location within Switzerland Location within Canton of Schwyz
- Country: Switzerland
- Canton: Schwyz

Buechberg (also spelled Buchberg) is an elongated molasse hill in the Swiss canton of Schwyz (March District), located southeast of the Obersee (Lake Zurich). At 631 metres (2,070 ft), its summit is significantly lower than the surrounding mountains of the Appenzell Alps (e.g. Höchhand, Speer, Federispitz) and Schwyzer Alps (e.g. Planggenstock), which are over 1,300 metres (4,300 ft) high.

Buechberg is traversed by two parallel tunnels of the A53 motorway, which joins the A3 motorway south of the hill. Buechberg is also popular for hiking and contains a bicycle route.

== Name ==
The official name is the Swiss-German language term Buechberg (not written with "ü"), although Buchberg is often used.

== Geography ==
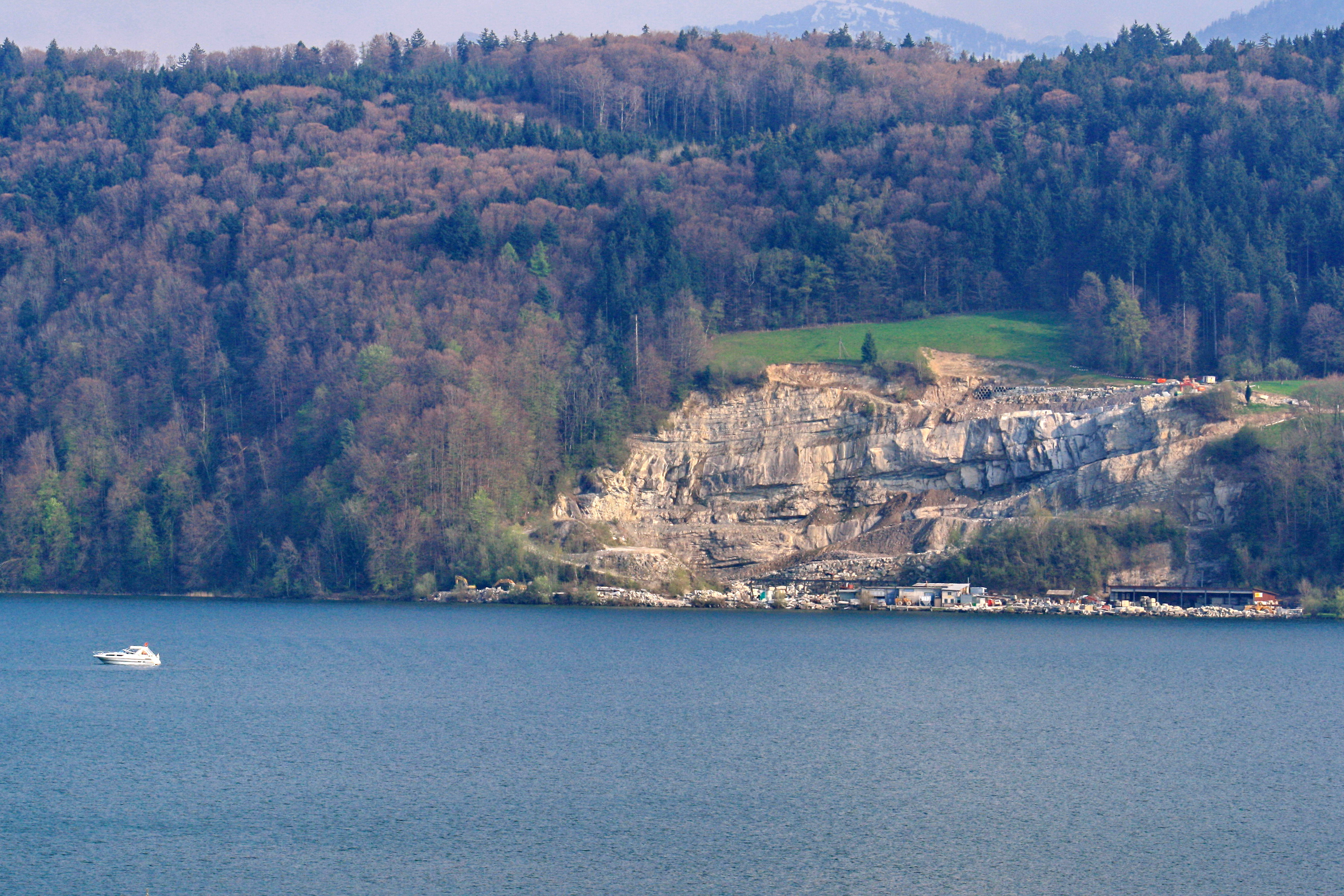
Bollingen quarry

Buechberg, together with the nearby Benkner Büchel, are molasse hills and remains of the last glacial period in Switzerland. Situated on the southeastern Obersee lakeshore, Buechberg is situated on the area of the municipalities of Tuggen and Wangen−Nuolen in the canton of Schwyz, bordered by the lakeshore area in the canton of St. Gallen and by the Linth river towards Schmerikon. The highest elevation is about 631 metres (2,070 ft) above sea level at the southwestern end of the hill, overlooking the Linth and Obersee area, which are at around 406 metres (1,332 ft) above sea level.

The commonly called Bollingen Sandstone since centuries is used for the construction of buildings, among them the Einsiedeln Abbey and the St. Gallen Abbey, as well as for the construction of Fraumünster and Grossmünster in Zurich; the quarries are still in use.

== Güntliweid–Bätzimatt protected area ==
Among the area around the Holzbrücke Rapperswil-Hurden lake crossing and between Rapperswil and Busskirch around Obersee, Güntliweid up to Bätzimatt at Buechberg are listed ast bird reserves of national importance. The reserve is located on the south shore, at the foothills of Buechberg and extends from the south of Bätzimatt at Schmerikon to Güntliweid east of Lachen. It is considered as a particularly valuable resting place for waders, and may be obtained as resting place for birds on passage.

== History ==
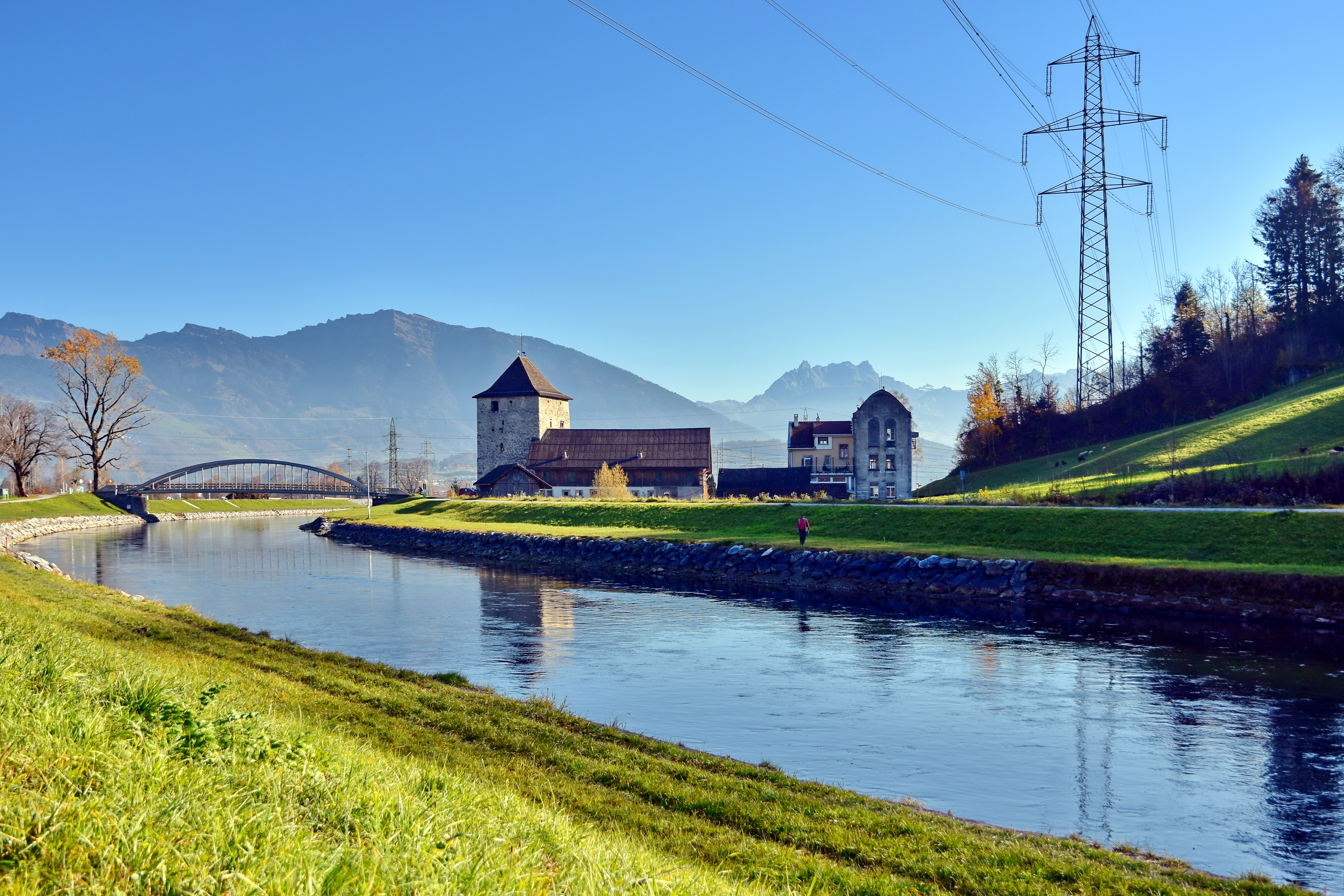
Grynau Castle and Linth Canal

About two thousand years ago, Buechberg formed an island in the former flat Tuggenersee lake area, and there was probably at least one Roman watching tower on the hill established. In the early 13th century AD the House of Rapperswil built the Grynau Castle at the most important and strategically river crossing over the Linth river nearby the then nearly landed lake.

From Tuggen there's also a historical road heading from the former granary at the Grynau Castle over the Buechberg hill towards Siebnen.

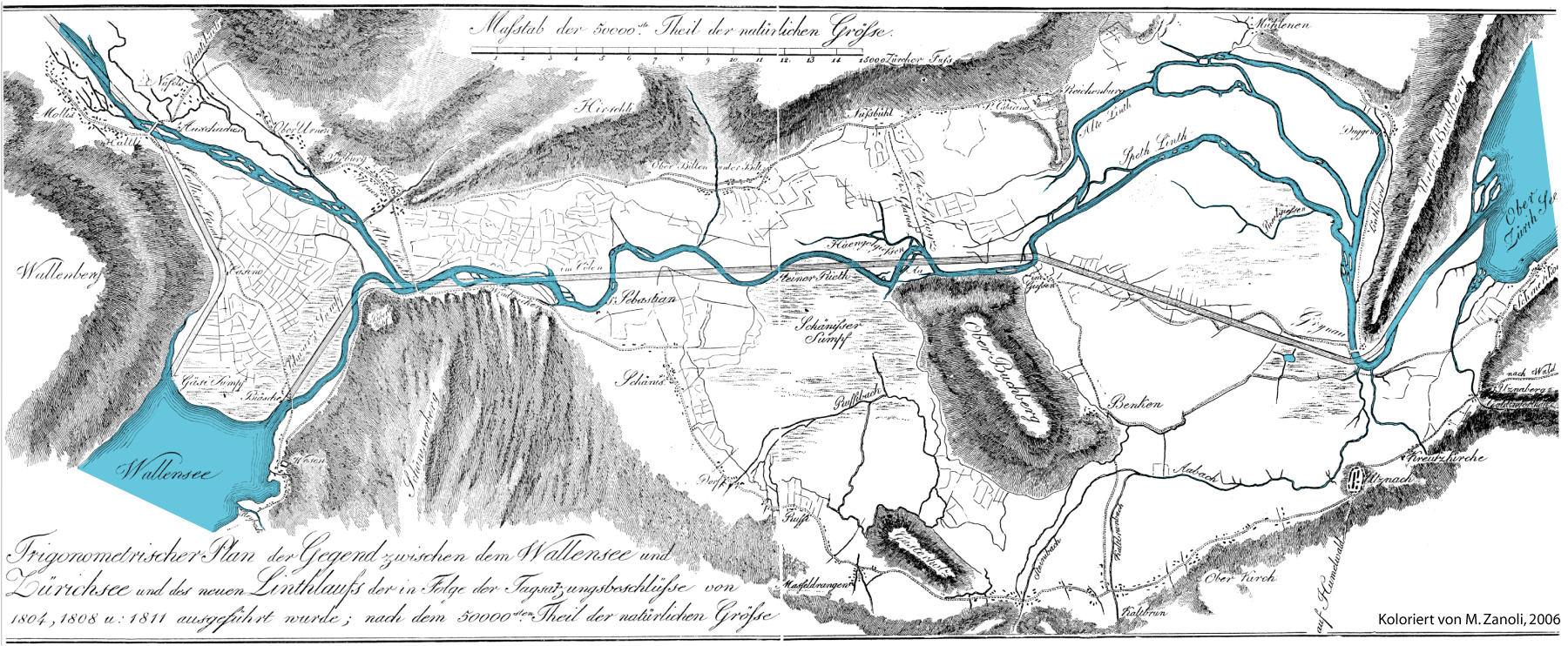
The plain of the Linth river between Weesen and Schmerikon in 1811, before and after the correction, showing also the location of the Buechberg hill on the right side

The taming of the Linth river (Linthkorrektur) from 1807 to 1823 once more changed the landscape.

== See also ==
- List of mountains of the canton of Schwyz
