= Bollinger Sandstein =

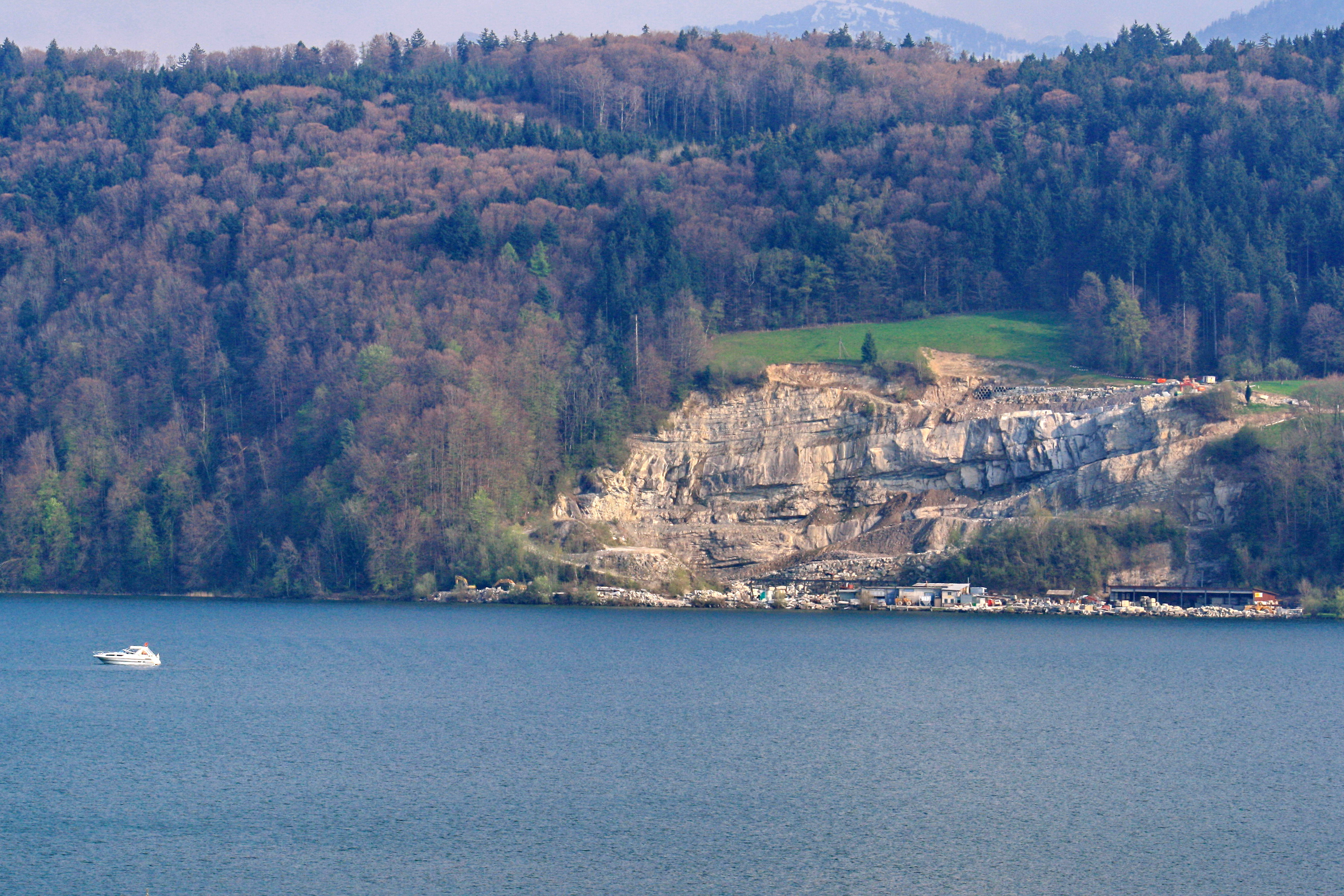
- Buechberg quarry as seen from Bollingen
- Unit of: Buechberg

Lithology
- Primary: Sandstone

Location
- Coordinates: 47°12′N 8°53′E
- Region: Obersee (Zürichsee), cantons of St. Gallen and Schwyz
- Country: Switzerland

Type section
- Named for: Bollingen

Bollinger Sandstein or Bollingen Sandstone is a sandstone found on Obersee lake shore, namely between Bollingen and Uznach and Buechberg area, in the cantons of St. Gallen and Schwyz in Switzerland.

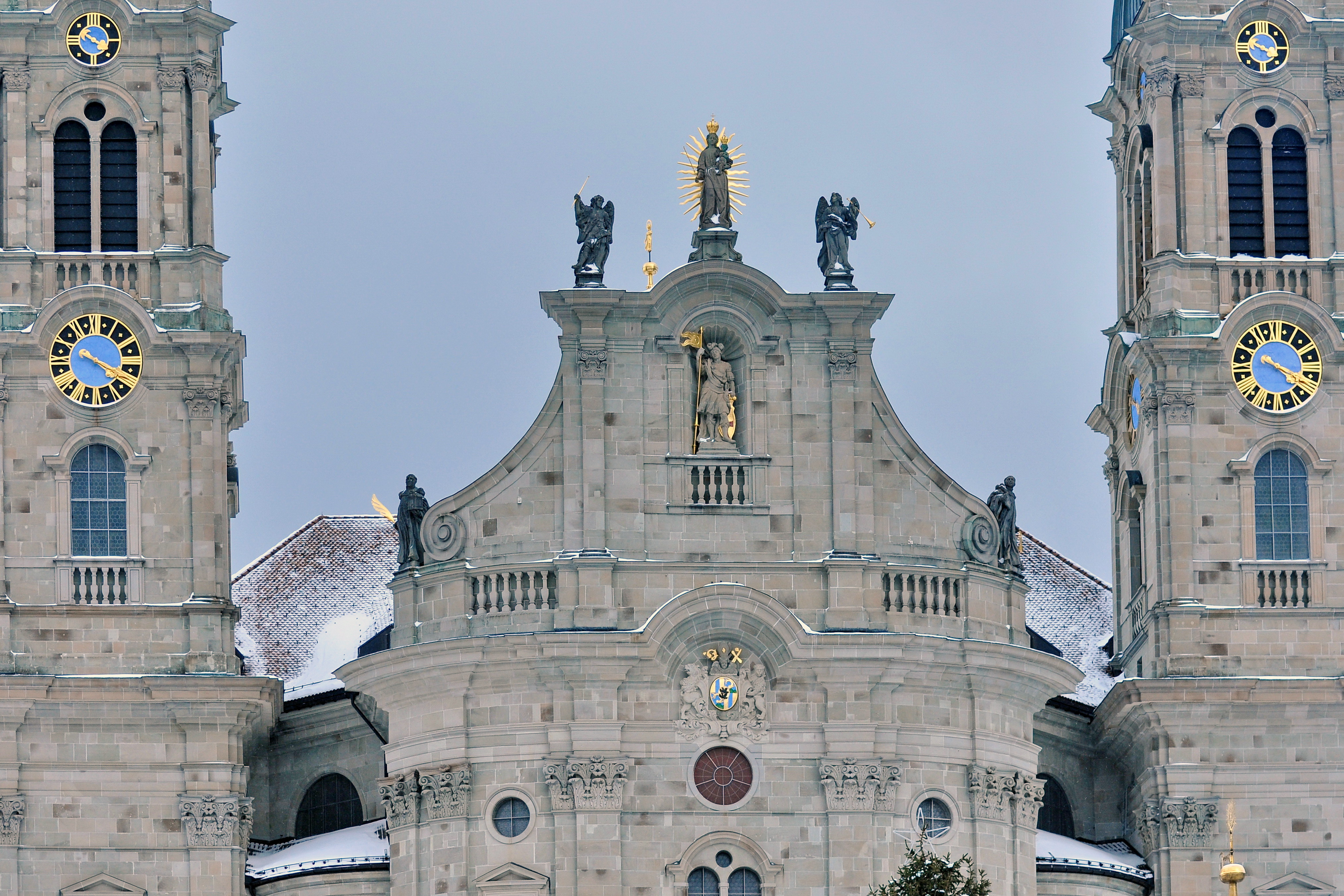
Detail view of the facade of the Einsiedeln Abbey

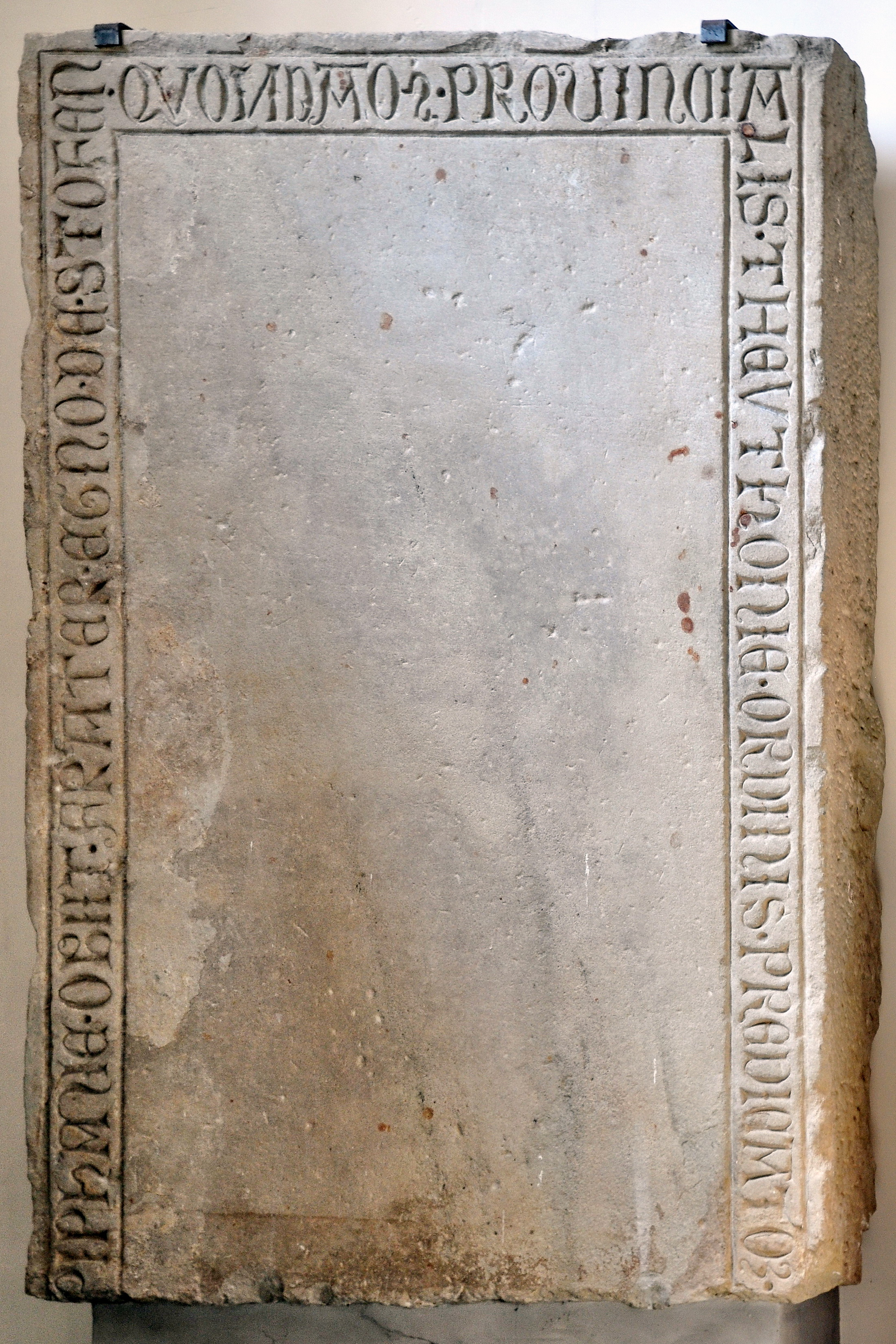
Ledger stone made of Bollingen sandstone: "Hie est sepultus frater Heinricus de Ruchenstein", a member of the ministerially of the House of Rapperswil, buried in the Predigerkirche Zürich around 1270.

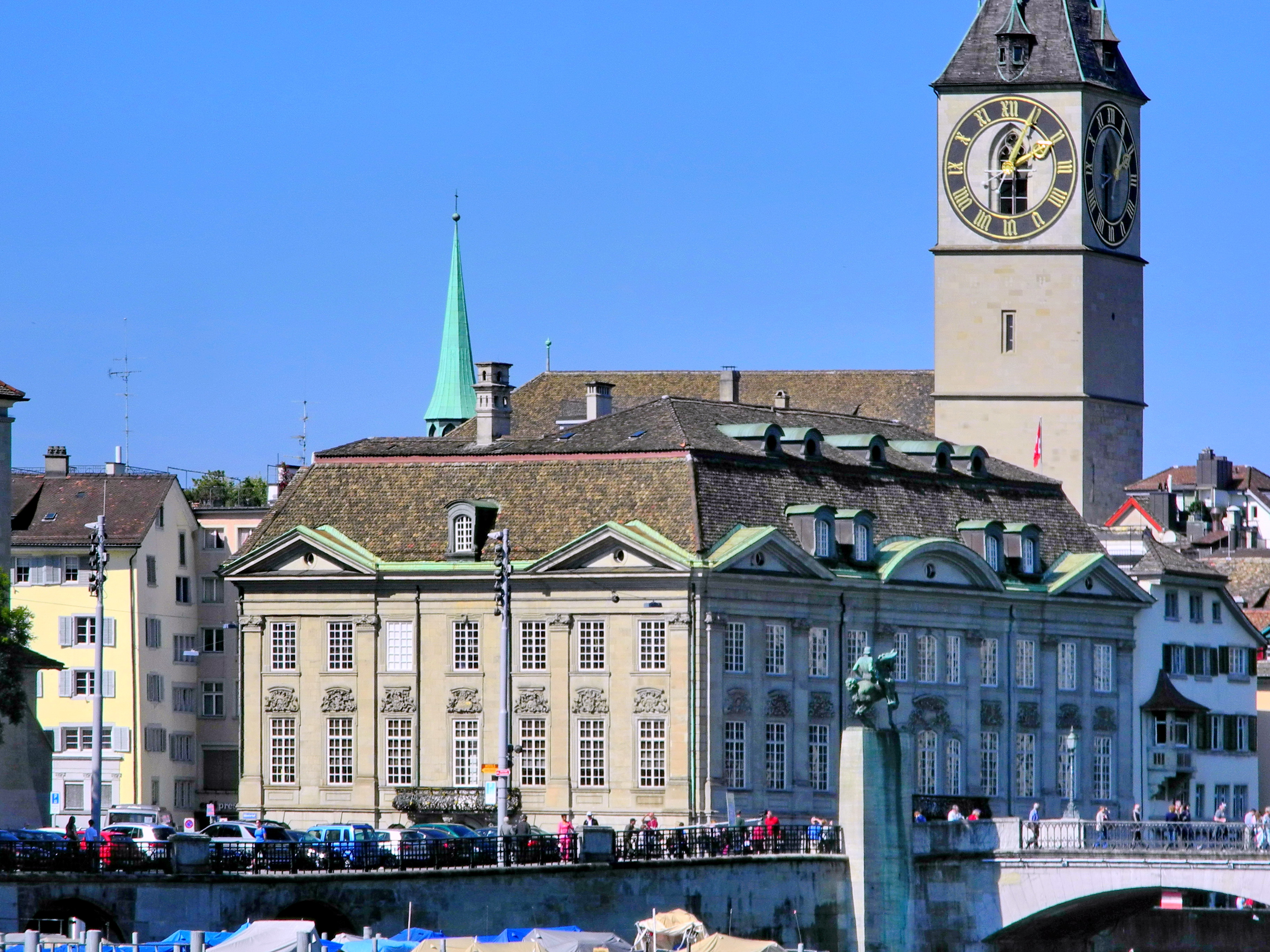
Zunfthaus zur Meisen at the Münsterhof plaza, as seen from Limmatquai Zürich, Münsterbrücke Zürich in the foreground.

== Geography ==
The sandstone is found on Obersee (upper Lake Zürich) northeastern shore, namely between Bollingen and Uznach and on the other side of the lake at the Buechberg area, in the Swiss cantons of St. Gallen and Schwyz.

== Description ==
Depending on the layer, the appearance and texture of the natural stone also varies, therefore distinct names have developed at the different mining locations: Güntliweid sandstone means a darker, coarse-grained portion of the deposit. The Buechberg variant has a bit brighter colour, while the Uznaberg sandstone is bright and even fine-grained. In addition to these names, the Bollinger-Brand sandstone is mined in Eschenbach SG and the Bollinger-Lehholz sandstone is mined between Jona and Bollingen.

The Bollingen sandstone is lime bound, it contains 30 to 50% quartz grains and 25 to 35% feldspars, 4 to 8% mica and chlorite, and the proportion of binder lime is between 5 and 18%. The sandstone contains also particles of clay up to 10 millimetres (0.39 in). The color ranges from blue-gray to gray-green, and there are lighter and darker layers.

Since the incidence even partly is mined within the Güntliweid–Bätzimatt nature reserve, Bollinger sandstone is extracted at its different locations usually in the pit mining method, working with wire saws that cut the stone vertically in up to 60 metres (197 ft) deep shafts. Related to Swiss sandstone quarries, the occurrence of natural stone is comparatively large, hence, since centuries the sandstone is mined at several locations.

== History of purpose ==
The present quarry Lehholz mines sandstone in an open-ended cavity. It dates back to 1252 AD when Rudolf II von Rapperswil founded the nearby Wurmsbach Abbey in Jona. For the construction sandstone was used from dedicated quarries, and for centuries high quality "monastic" sandstone was mined. It was transferred with oxen to the lake shore transshipping point to be shipped with so-called Ledi boats towards the present Sechsläutenplatz Zürich far into the 19th century. Particularly the present municipality of Zürich used the Bollingen quarries for the construction of countless public and private buildings, for example, the cathedral towers and the city fortifications, or the Zunfthaus zur Meisen that was built in 1757 with stone from the Buechberg quarry.

The medieval town of Rapperswil, home of the Counts of Rapperswil, also mined sandstone on the Lützelau island. Presumably Bollinger sandstone is extracted and processed since around 1000 AD, and among others it was also used for the Fraumünster and Grossmünster churches in Zürich, as well as for the Einsiedeln and St. Gallen abbeys.

The Bollingen sandstone is the ideal material for outdoor use and commonly it is still used for solid masonry, walling stones and among others for bridges. Also facades, window and door frames, fountains and grave stones are made from the Bollingen stone.

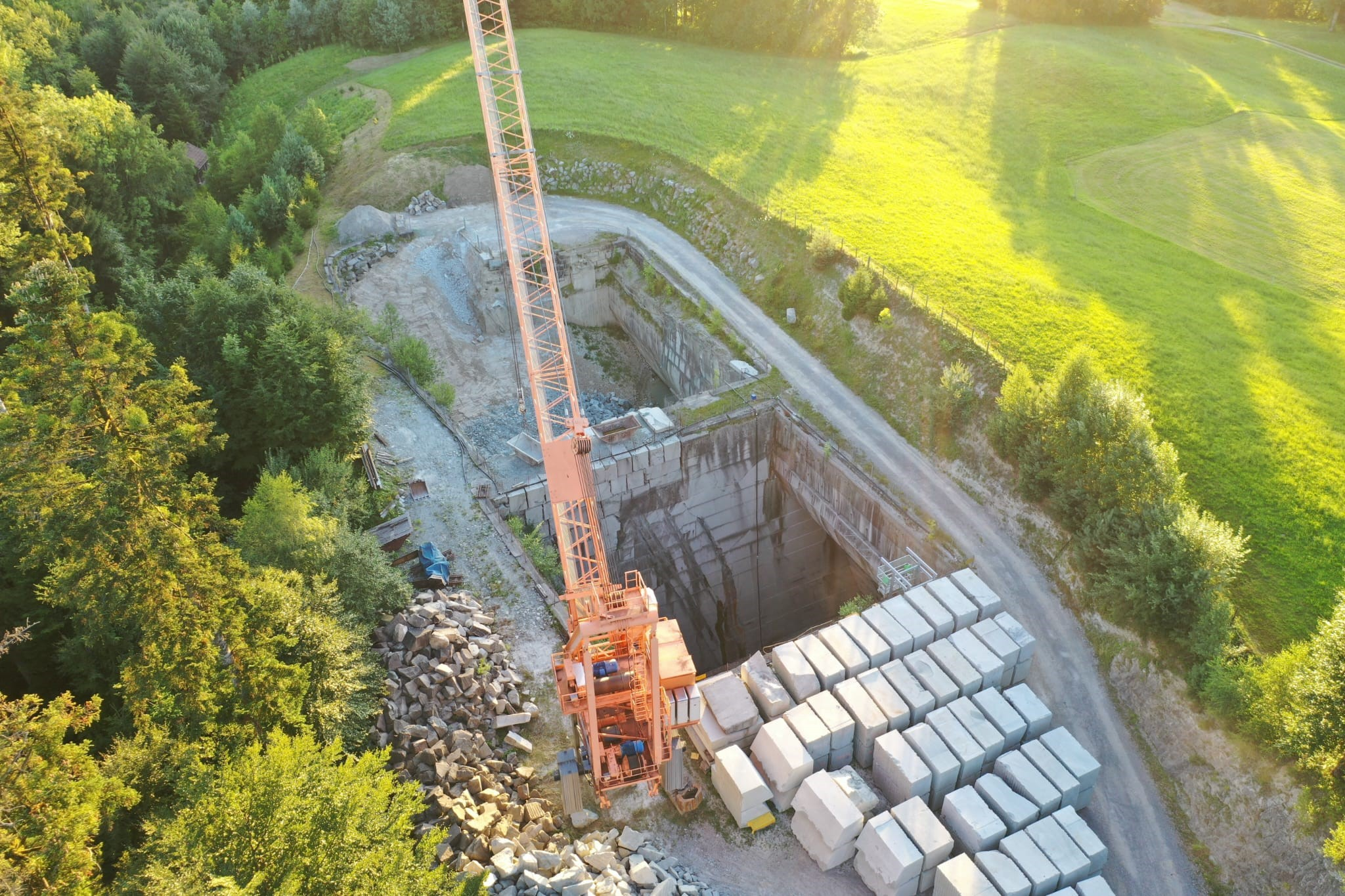
Bollinger-Brand quarry, in Eschenbach SG

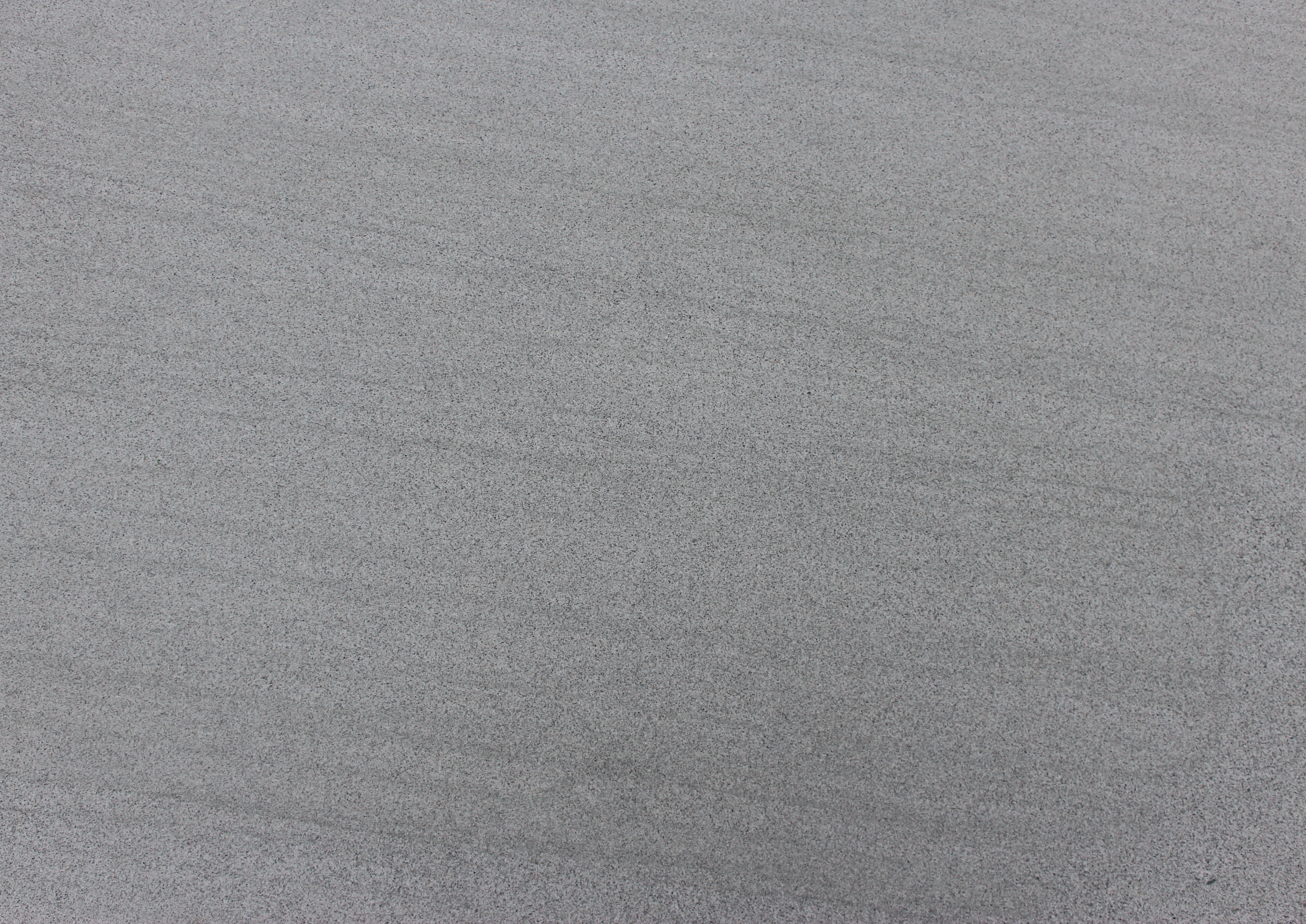
Bollinger-Brand structure and color

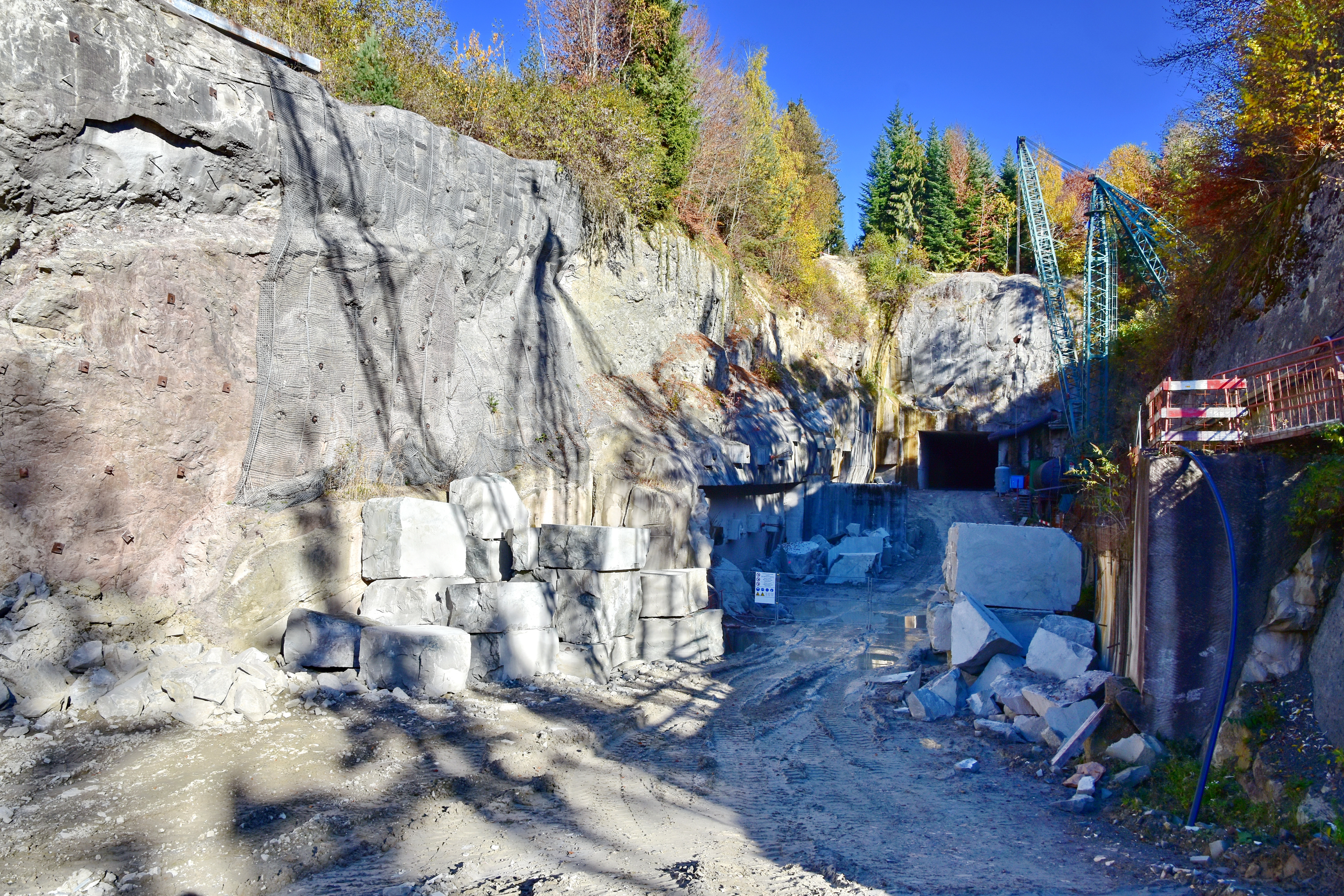
Lehholz quarry

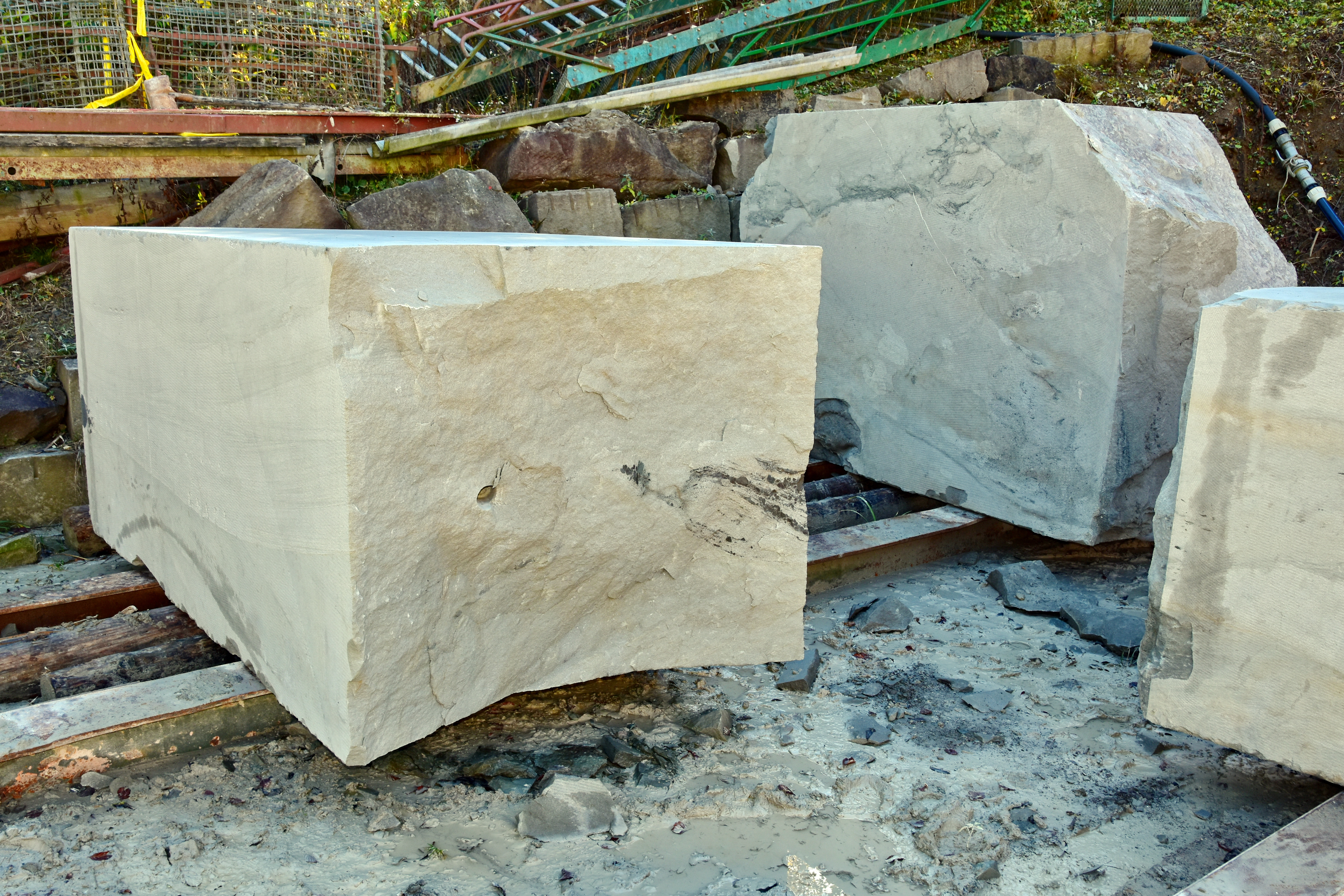

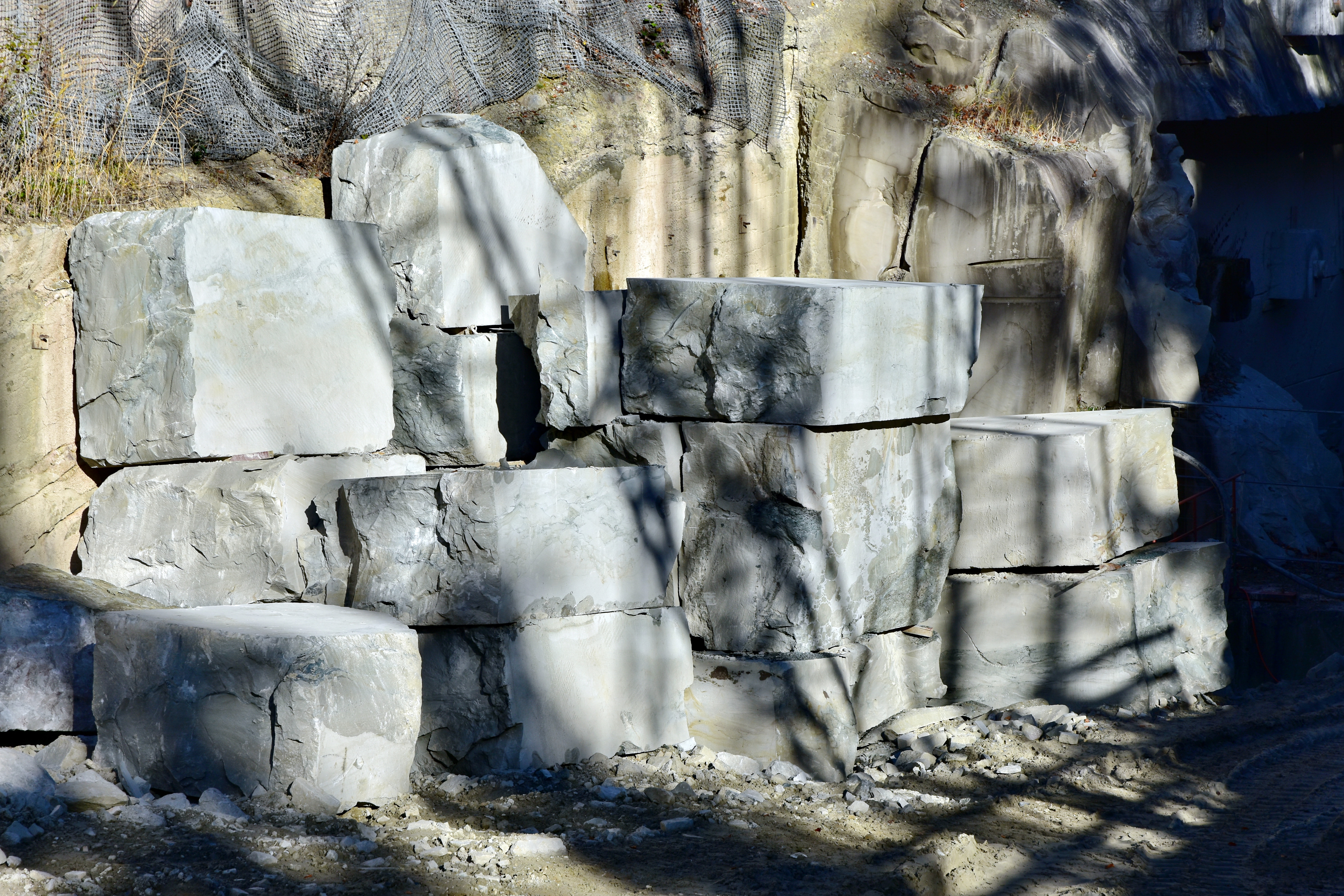

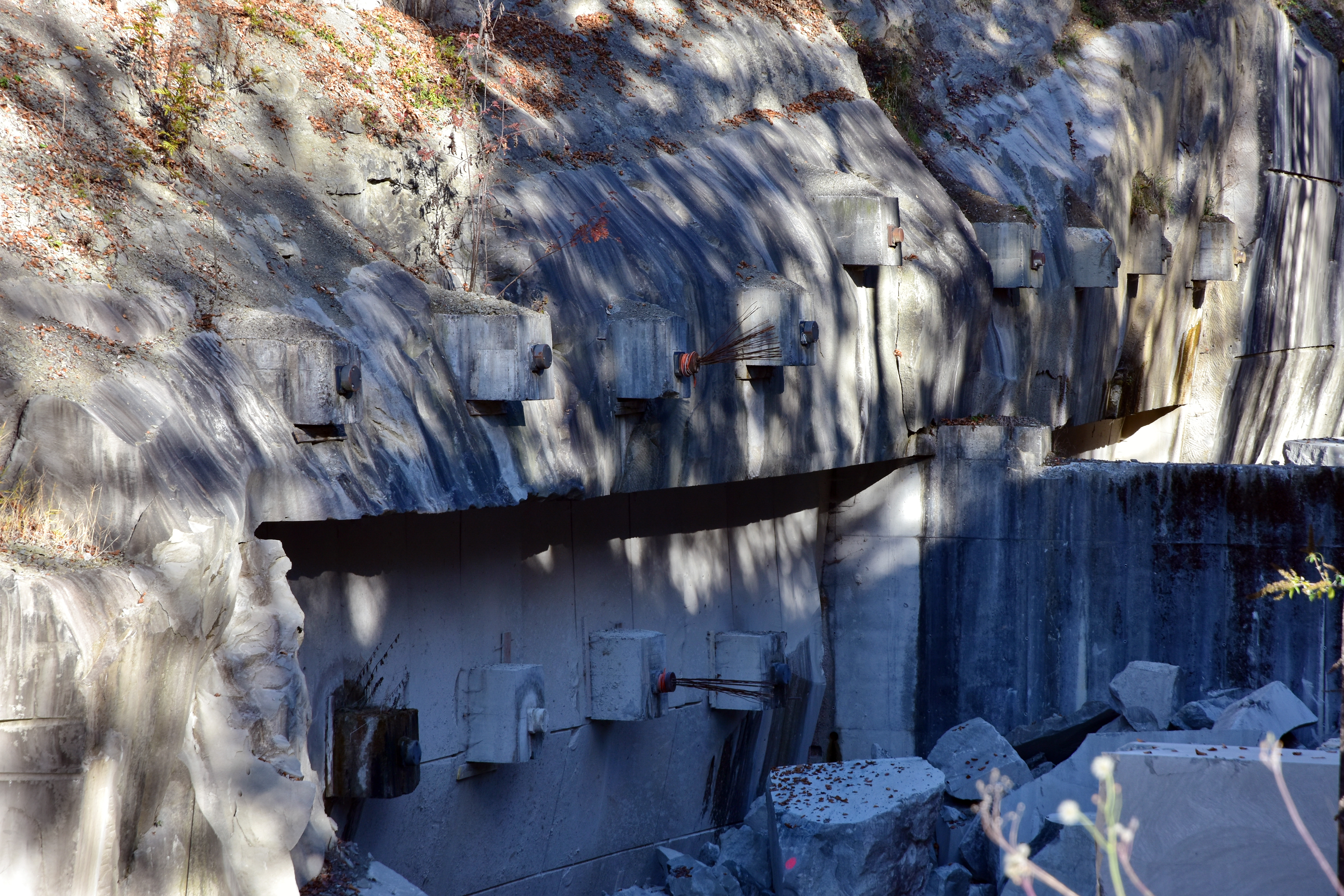

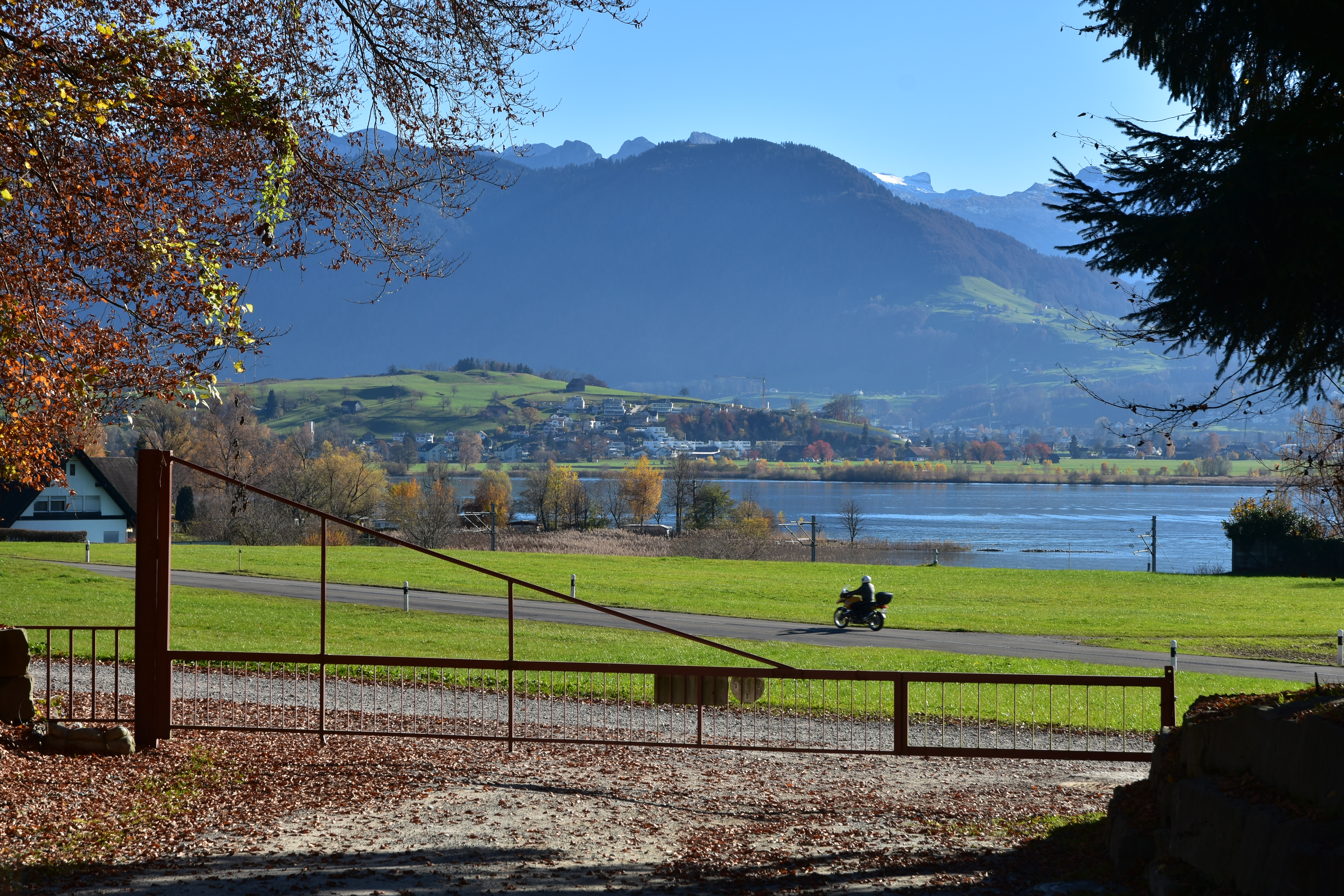
Lehholz between Bollingen and Jona-Wagen, Buechberg in the background to the left

In the area between Lehholz and Uznaberg once existed over 100 mining sites which offered for several hundred workers jobs in heyday. Almost 2,000 cubic metres (70,629 ft^{3}) of sandstone still are mined (as of 2004) annually, usually 1.5 metres (5 ft) wide and about 3.5 metres (11 ft) high blocks weighing approximately 16 tonnes, even up to 30 tonnes.

== See also ==
- Bollingen
- Buechberg
- Obersee (Zürichsee)
