= Tuggen =

- Municipality
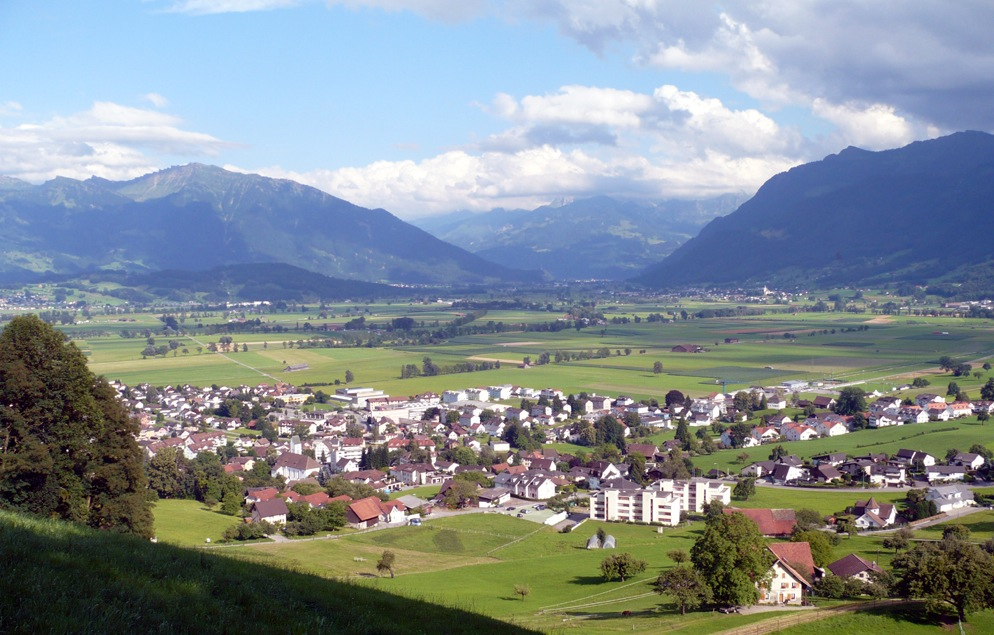

- Flag Coat of arms
- Location of Tuggen
- Location within Switzerland Location within Canton of Schwyz
- Coordinates: 47°12′N 8°56′E
- Country: Switzerland
- Canton: Schwyz
- District: March

Government
  - Mayor: Carl Sobers

Area
  - Total: 15.30 km^{2} (5.91 sq mi)
- Elevation: 409 m (1,342 ft)

Population (December 2020)
  - Total: 3,317
  - Density: 216.8/km^{2} (561.5/sq mi)
- Time zone: UTC+01:00 (CET)
  - Summer (DST): UTC+02:00 (CEST)
- Postal code: 8856
- SFOS number: 1347
- ISO 3166 code: CH-SZ
- Surrounded by: Benken (SG), Jona (SG), Schmerikon (SG), Schübelbach, Uznach (SG), Wangen
- Twin towns: Unterharmersbach (Germany)
- Website: www.tuggen.ch

Tuggen (German pronunciation: [ˈtʊɡn̩]; High Alemannic: Tugge) is a municipality in March District in the canton of Schwyz in Switzerland.

== History ==
According to Walafrid Strabo the Irish missionaries Columban and Gall arrived at Tuggen around the year 610. They intended to settle in the area, but fled after Gall had burnt down a local pagan holy place. Saint Gall is today depicted on the municipality's coat of arms.

== Geography ==
Aerial view from 500 m (1,600 ft) by Walter Mittelholzer (1923)

Tuggen has an area, as of 2006, of 13.6 km^{2} (5.3 sq mi). Of this area, 62.7% is used for agricultural purposes, while 22.1% is forested. Of the rest of the land, 11.6% is settled (buildings or roads) and the remainder (3.6%) is non-productive (rivers, glaciers or mountains). The Buechberg, a Molasse hill, is located on the area of the municipality, located on the shore of Obersee (Lake Zurich). The former Tuggenersee (Lake Tuggen), which existed in the area until the early 16th century, was named after the municipality.

== Demographics ==
Tuggen has a population (as of 31 December 2020) of 3,317. As of 2007, 14.7% of the population was made up of foreign nationals. Over the last 10 years the population has grown at a rate of 12.9%. Most of the population (as of 2000) speaks German (90.1%), with Italian being second most common ( 2.5%) and Serbo-Croatian being third ( 1.8%).

As of 2000 the gender distribution of the population was 50.0% male and 50.0% female. The age distribution, as of 2008, in Tuggen is; 735 people or 27.8% of the population is between 0 and 19. 861 people or 32.5% are 20 to 39, and 806 people or 30.5% are 40 to 64. The senior population distribution is 137 people or 5.2% are 65 to 74. There are 83 people or 3.1% who are 70 to 79 and 24 people or 0.91% of the population who are over 80.

As of 2000 there are 1,013 households, of which 263 households (or about 26.0%) contain only a single individual. 90 or about 8.9% are large households, with at least five members.

In the 2007 election the most popular party was the SVP which received 53.9% of the vote. The next three most popular parties were the FDP (21.1%), the CVP (12.4%) and the SPS (10.1%).

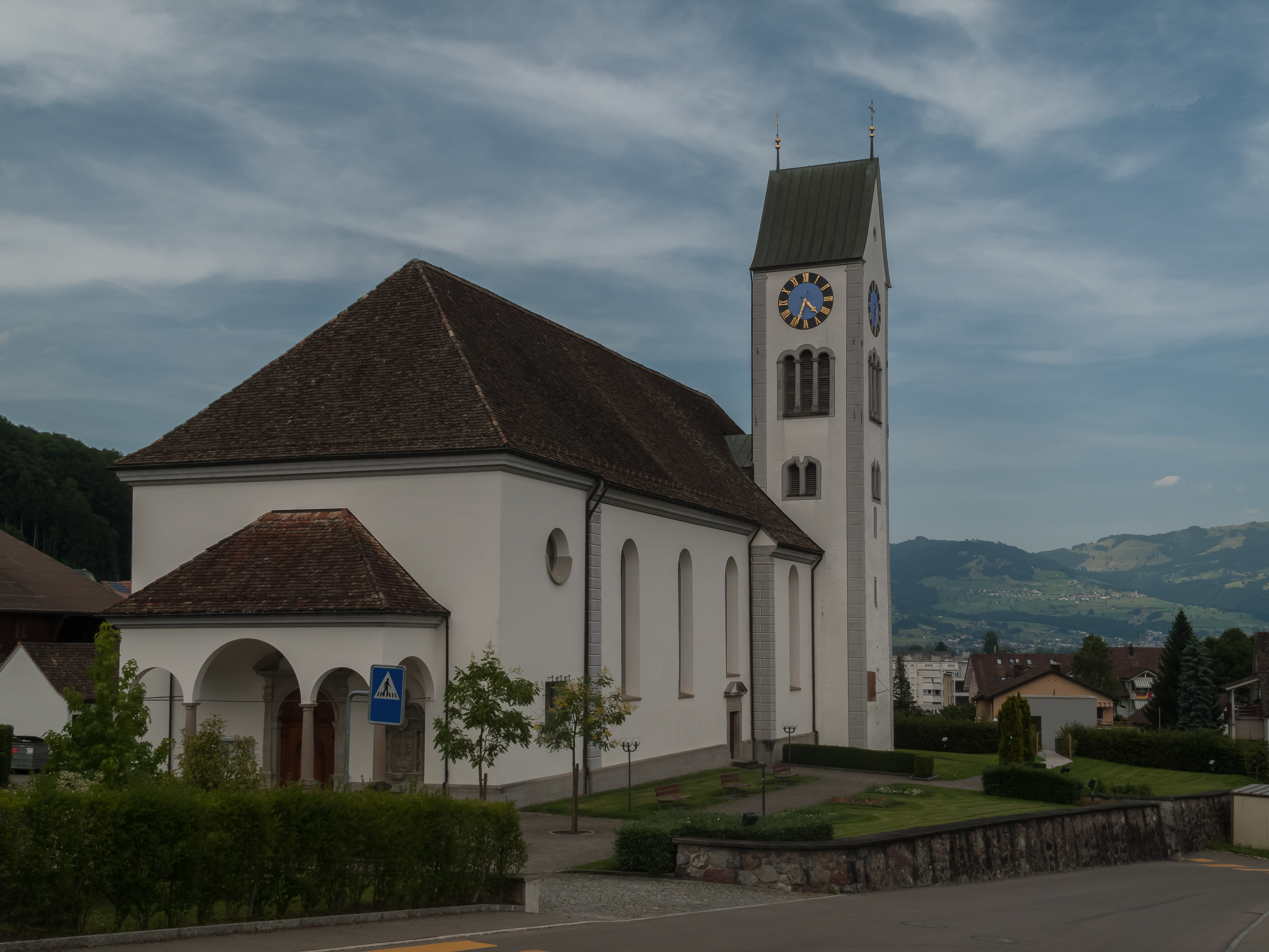
Church: Pfarrkirche Sankt Erhard

In Tuggen about 63.8% of the population (between age 25–64) have completed either non-mandatory upper secondary education or additional higher education (either university or a Fachhochschule).

Tuggen has an unemployment rate of 0.91%. As of 2005, there were 138 people employed in the primary economic sector and about 50 businesses involved in this sector. 372 people are employed in the secondary sector and there are 42 businesses in this sector. 345 people are employed in the tertiary sector, with 71 businesses in this sector.

From the 2000 census, 2,069 or 78.2% are Roman Catholic, while 254 or 9.6% belonged to the Swiss Reformed Church. Of the rest of the population, there are 32 individuals (or about 1.21% of the population) who belong to the Orthodox Church, and there are less than 5 individuals who belong to another Christian church. There are 124 (or about 4.69% of the population) who are Islamic. There are 8 individuals (or about 0.30% of the population) who belong to another church (not listed on the census), 86 (or about 3.25% of the population) belong to no church, are agnostic or atheist, and 72 individuals (or about 2.72% of the population) did not answer the question.

The historical population is given in the following table:

year	population
1950	1,409
1960	1,551
1970	1,851
1980	1,914
1985	2,044
1990	2,220
2000	2,682
2005	2,671
2007	2,774

== Transport ==
As of December 2025, two PostAuto bus routes serve Tuggen, linking it with Uznach railway station, Siebnen-Wangen railway station and Reichenburg. The A3 and A15 motorways cross the municipality.

== Sports ==
FC Tuggen are the local football team. The team currently plays in Liga 1., the third highest tier in the Swiss football pyramid. They play at Linthstrasse.

== Heritage sites of national significance ==
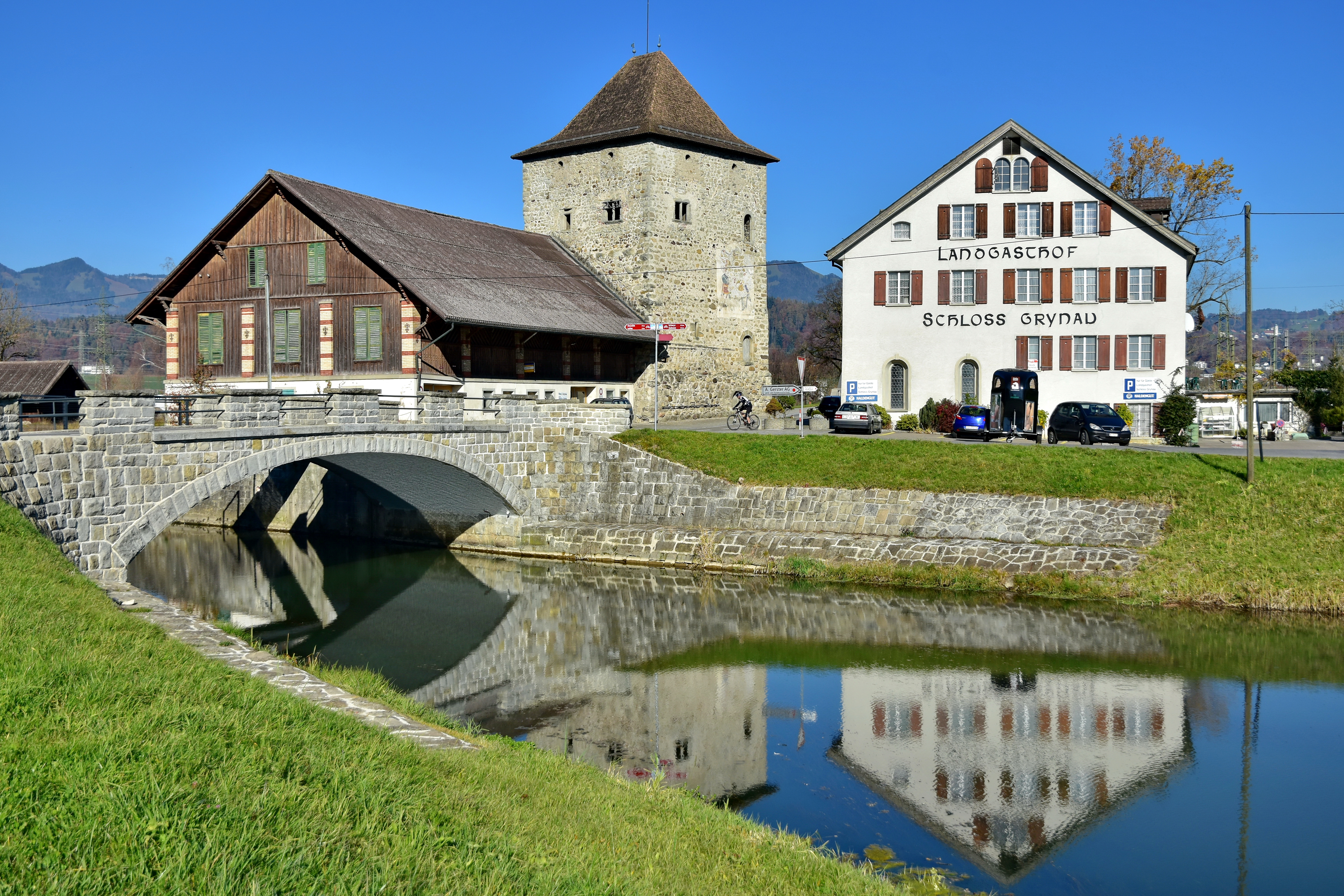
Grynau Castle

Grynau Castle and the historic bridge crossing over the Linth river are listed in the heritage site of national significance.
