= Schmerikon =

- Municipality
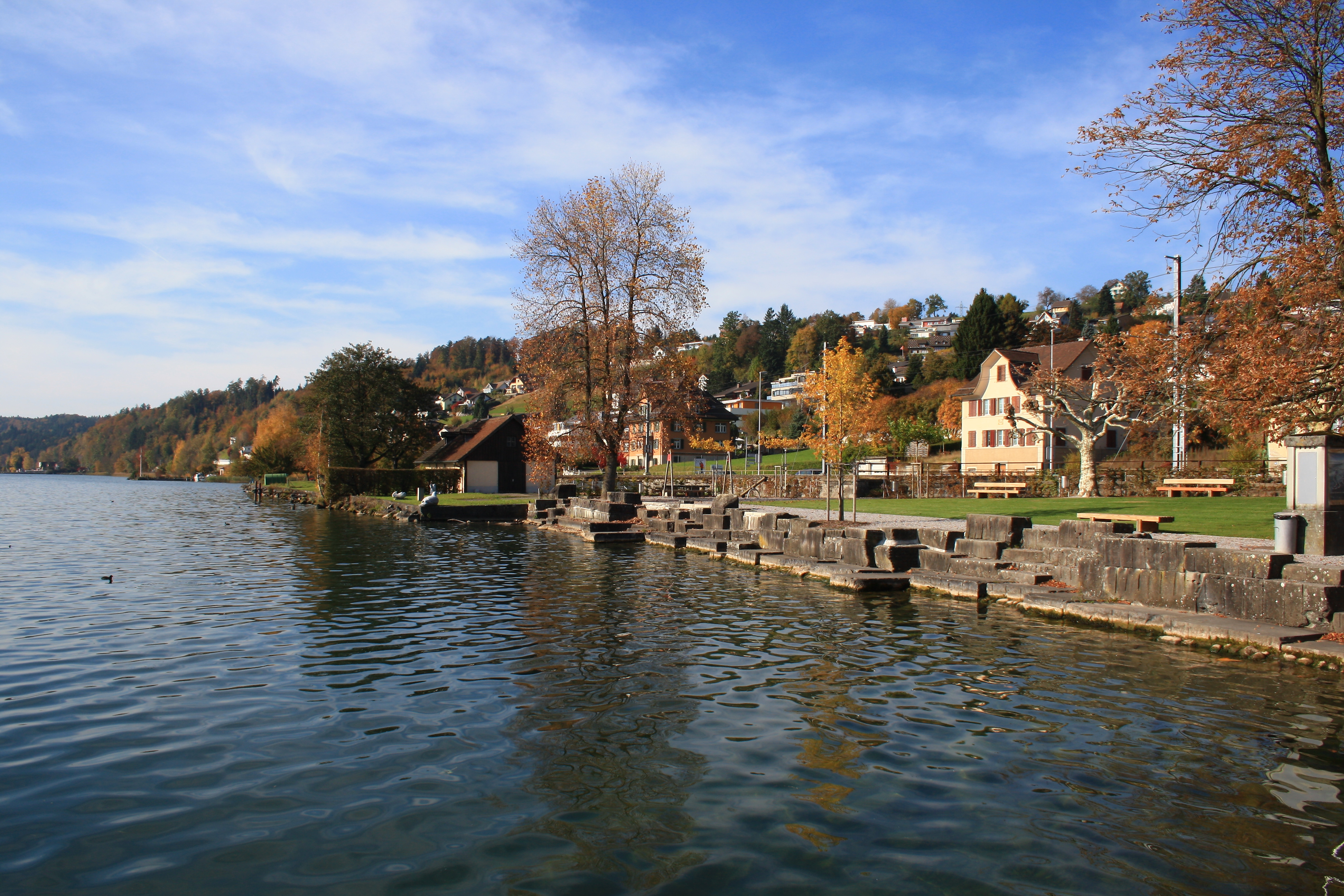
- Schmerikon waterfront

- Flag Coat of arms
- Location of Schmerikon
- Location within Switzerland Location within Canton of St. Gallen
- Coordinates: 47°14′N 8°57′E
- Country: Switzerland
- Canton: St. Gallen
- District: Wahlkreis See-Gaster

Government
  - Mayor: Félix Brunschwiler

Area
  - Total: 4.15 km^{2} (1.60 sq mi)
- Elevation: 408 m (1,339 ft)

Population (December 2020)
  - Total: 3,971
  - Density: 957/km^{2} (2,480/sq mi)
- Time zone: UTC+01:00 (CET)
  - Summer (DST): UTC+02:00 (CEST)
- Postal code: 8716
- SFOS number: 3338
- ISO 3166 code: CH-SG
- Surrounded by: Eschenbach, Jona, Tuggen (SZ), Uznach
- Website: www.schmerikon.ch

Schmerikon is a municipality in the Wahlkreis (constituency) of See-Gaster in the canton of St. Gallen in Switzerland. In the local Swiss German dialect it is called Schmerike.

== Geography ==
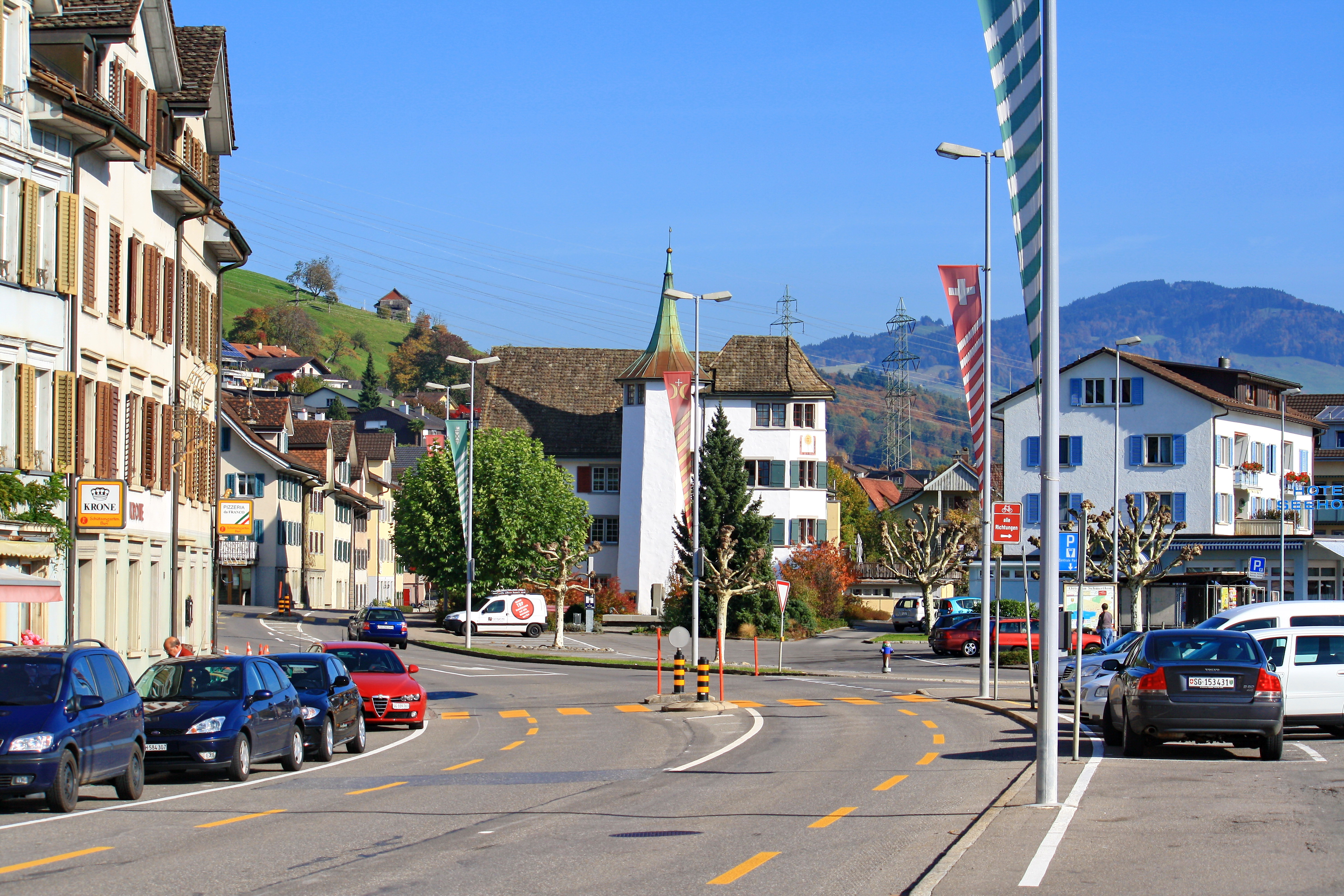
Schmerikon

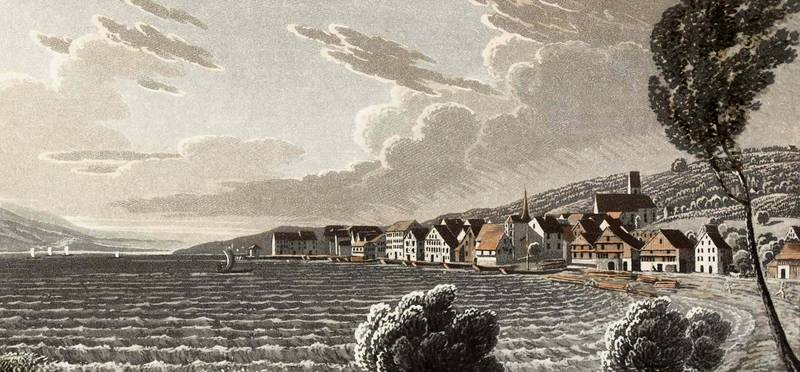
Schmerikon in 1825

Aerial view from 150 m by Walter Mittelholzer (1919)

Schmerikon is located at the head of Lake Zurich, on the section of the lake known as the Obersee and where the Linth river enters the lake. Part of the municipality is a natural reserve, particularly along the lake shore.

Schmerikon has an area, as of 2006, of 4 km^{2} (1.5 sq mi). Of this area, 38.9% is used for agricultural purposes, while 23% is forested. Of the rest of the land, 27% is settled (buildings or roads) and the remainder (11.1%) is non-productive (rivers or lakes).

== Coat of arms ==
The blazon of the municipal coat of arms is Gules two Crescents addorsed Or and in chief a Cross pattee Argent.

== Demographics ==
Schmerikon has a population (as of 31 December 2020) of 3,971. As of 2007, about 25.9% of the population was made up of foreign nationals. Of the foreign population, (as of 2000), 22 are from Germany, 239 are from Italy, 363 are from ex-Yugoslavia, 17 are from Austria, 140 are from Turkey, and 97 are from another country. Over the last 10 years the population has grown at a rate of 8.2%. Most of the population (as of 2000) speaks German (83.4%), with Italian being second most common (4.7%) and Serbo-Croatian being third (3.2%). Of the Swiss national languages (as of 2000), 2,654 speak German, 11 people speak French, 150 people speak Italian, and 1 person speaks Romansh.

The age distribution, as of 2000, in Schmerikon is; 365 children or 11.5% of the population are between 0 and 9 years old and 420 teenagers or 13.2% are between 10 and 19. Of the adult population, 471 people or 14.8% of the population are between 20 and 29 years old. 494 people or 15.5% are between 30 and 39, 459 people or 14.4% are between 40 and 49, and 435 people or 13.7% are between 50 and 59. The senior population distribution is 262 people or 8.2% of the population are between 60 and 69 years old, 177 people or 5.6% are between 70 and 79, there are 79 people or 2.5% who are between 80 and 89, and there are 20 people or 0.6% who are between 90 and 99.

In 2000 there were 351 persons (or 11.0% of the population) who were living alone in a private dwelling. There were 673 (or 21.2%) persons who were part of a couple (married or otherwise committed) without children, and 1,904 (or 59.8%) who were part of a couple with children. There were 148 (or 4.7%) people who lived in single parent home, while there are 22 persons who were adult children living with one or both parents, 7 persons who lived in a household made up of relatives, 18 who lived household made up of unrelated persons, and 59 who are either institutionalized or live in another type of collective housing.

In the 2019 federal election the most popular party was the SVP which received 34.6% of the vote. The next three most popular parties were the FDP (18.2%), the CVP (13.8%), and the Greens (13.5%).

In Schmerikon about 64.4% of the population (between age 25–64) have completed either non-mandatory upper secondary education or additional higher education (either university or a Fachhochschule). Out of the total population in Schmerikon, as of 2000, the highest education level completed by 792 people (24.9% of the population) was Primary, while 1,164 (36.6%) have completed their secondary education, 279 (8.8%) have attended a Tertiary school, and 153 (4.8%) are not in school. The remainder did not answer this question.

== Transport ==
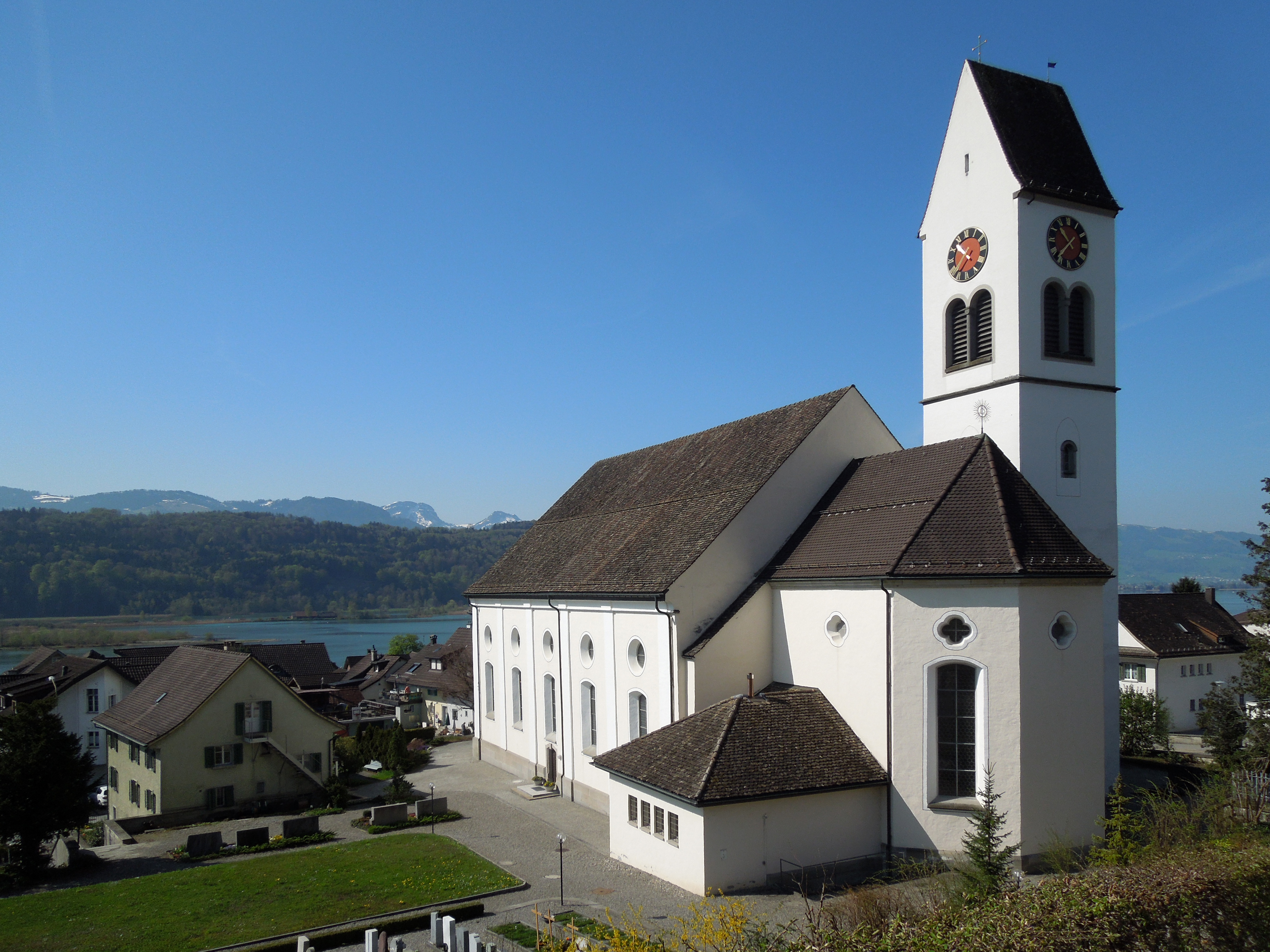
Village church of St. Jodokus

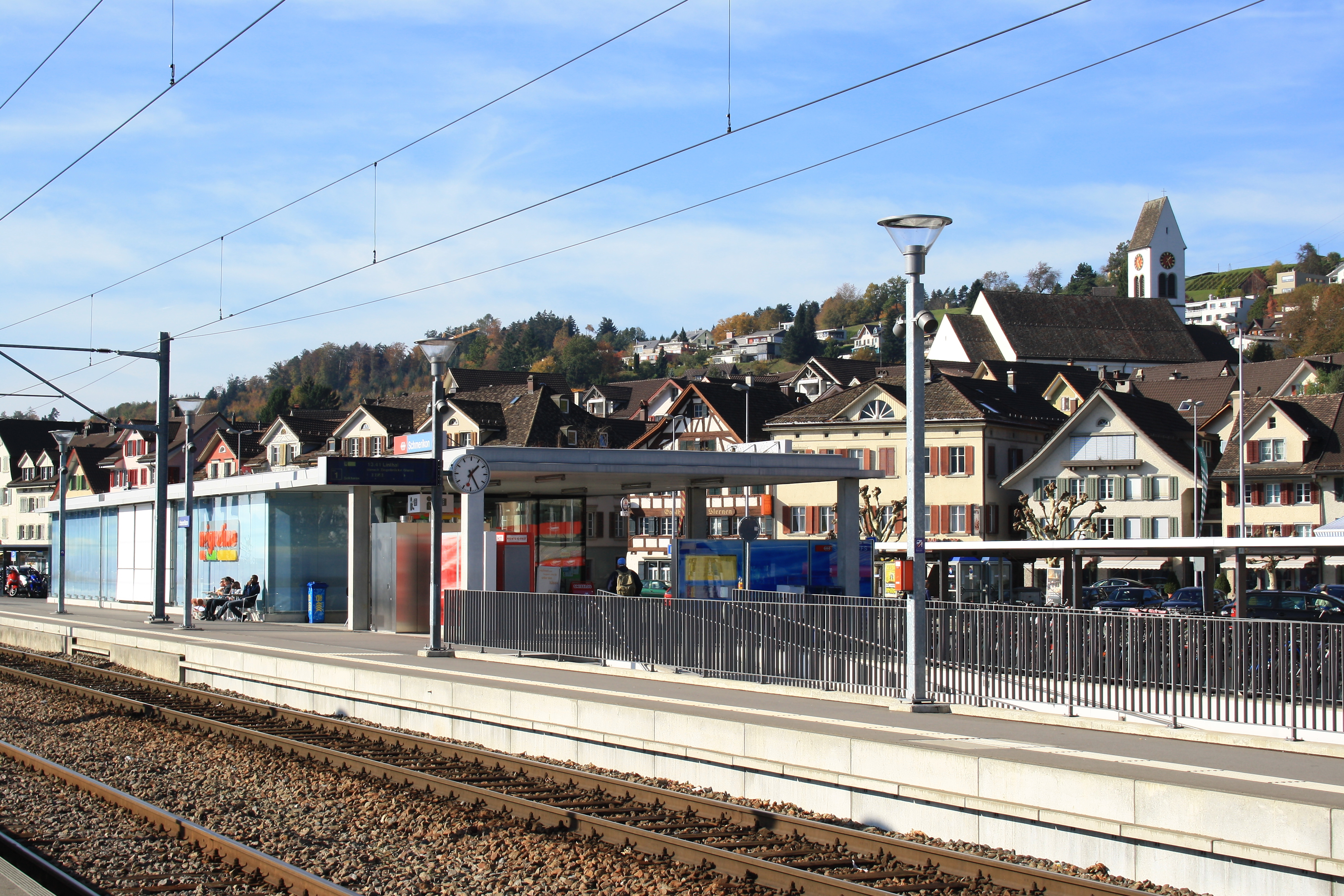
Schmerikon railway station

Schmerikon railway station is served by the inter-regional Voralpen Express, which links Lucerne and Romanshorn via Rapperswil and St. Gallen, and by a Regio service from Rapperswil to Linthal. Both trains run hourly, combining to provide a half-hourly service to Rapperswil.

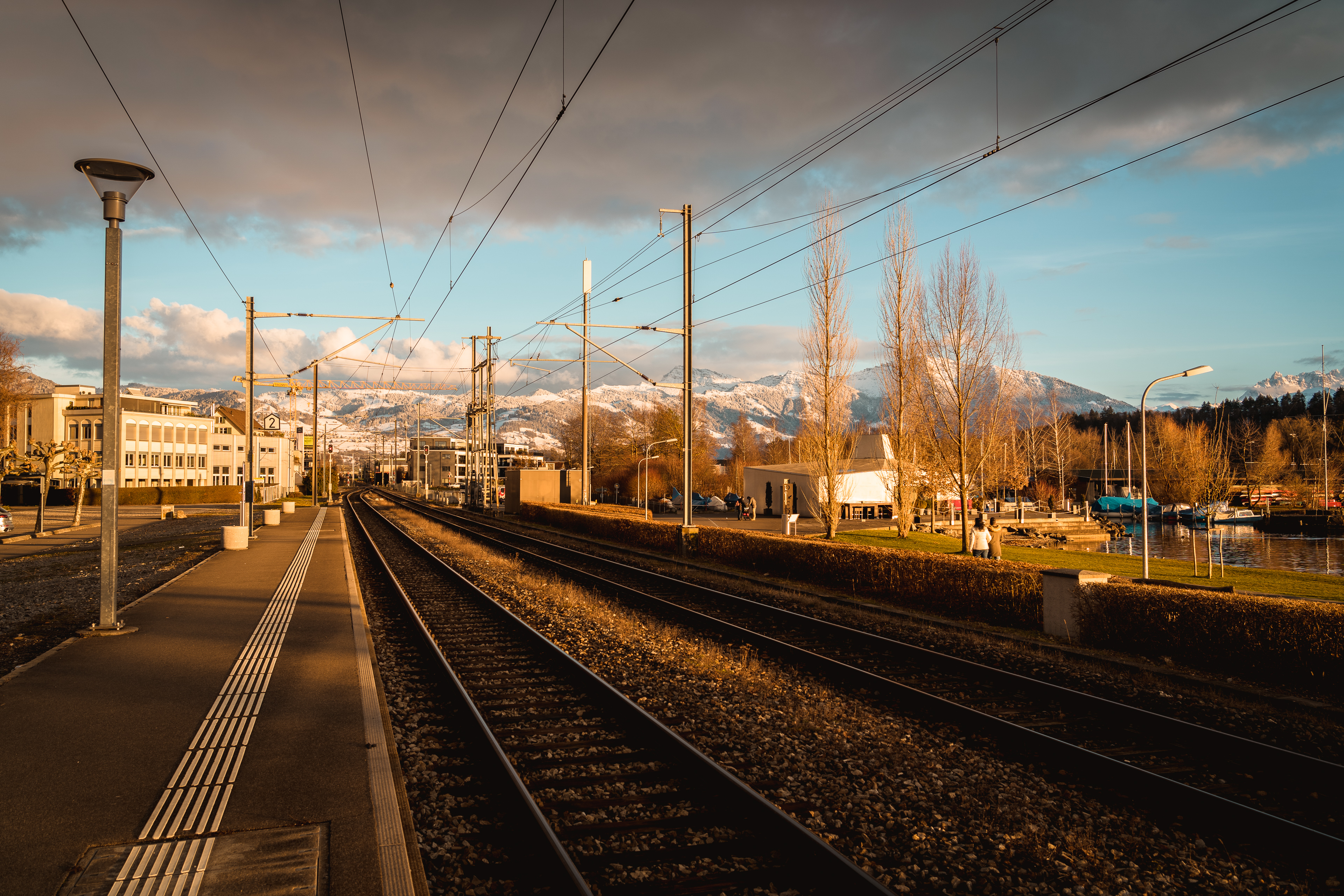
Schmerikon railway station - view to the east

The Zürichsee-Schifffahrtsgesellschaft provides passenger shipping services on Lake Zurich, including several daily through services to Zurich. These have a journey time of over three hours.

== Economy ==
As of 2007, Schmerikon had an unemployment rate of 1.67%. As of 2005, there were 105 people employed in the primary economic sector and about 19 businesses involved in this sector. 480 people are employed in the secondary sector and there are 49 businesses in this sector. 777 people are employed in the tertiary sector, with 112 businesses in this sector.

As of October 2009 the average unemployment rate was 4.1%. There were 185 businesses in the municipality of which 50 were involved in the secondary sector of the economy while 122 were involved in the third.

As of 2000 there were 584 residents who worked in the municipality, while 1,181 residents worked outside Schmerikon and 827 people commuted into the municipality for work.

The main bank in this small town is "Bank Linth". The two main supermarkets are both located a 5-minute walk away from the train station, which is also the town centre. Schmerikon is a home to Schluckibier brewery and Schmerknerwii winery.

== Religion ==
From the 2000 census, 2,147 or 67.5% are Roman Catholic, while 411 or 12.9% belonged to the Swiss Reformed Church. Of the rest of the population, there is 1 individual who belongs to the Christian Catholic faith, there are 56 individuals (or about 1.76% of the population) who belong to the Orthodox Church, and there are 22 individuals (or about 0.69% of the population) who belong to another Christian church. There is 1 individual who is Jewish, and 248 (or about 7.79% of the population) who are Islamic. There are 22 individuals (or about 0.69% of the population) who belong to another church (not listed on the census), 166 (or about 5.22% of the population) belong to no church, are agnostic or atheist, and 108 individuals (or about 3.39% of the population) did not answer the question.

== Sights ==
The village of Schmerikon is designated as part of the Inventory of Swiss Heritage Sites. There are 2 B-class objects of cultural property protected by Hague Convention for the Protection of Cultural Property in the Event of Armed Conflict: Haus zum Hirzen from 17th century and catholic church of St. Jodokus with a tower from 1500.

Schmerikoner Ried, a reed located on the northeastern lake shore in the Linthebene area towards the Grynau Castle, was set under federal protection as a low-moor bog of national importance (German: Bundesinventar der Flachmoore von nationaler Bedeutung) in 1994.

== Tourism ==
Thanks to its location along the lake Obersee, Schmerikon is popular weekend destination for cyclists and hikers. National cycling routes 9 (Lakes Route) and 99 (Herzroute) run through municipality. National hiking route 4 (Via Jacobi) run through municipality as one of Camino de Santiago pilgrimage routes as well as regional route 84 (Zürichsee-Rundweg).

Schmerikon offers a choice of hotels located at the lakeside. Municipality has indoor swimming pool and a lakeside pool with a large lakeside sunbathing lawn, offers rental service of various water sports equipment.

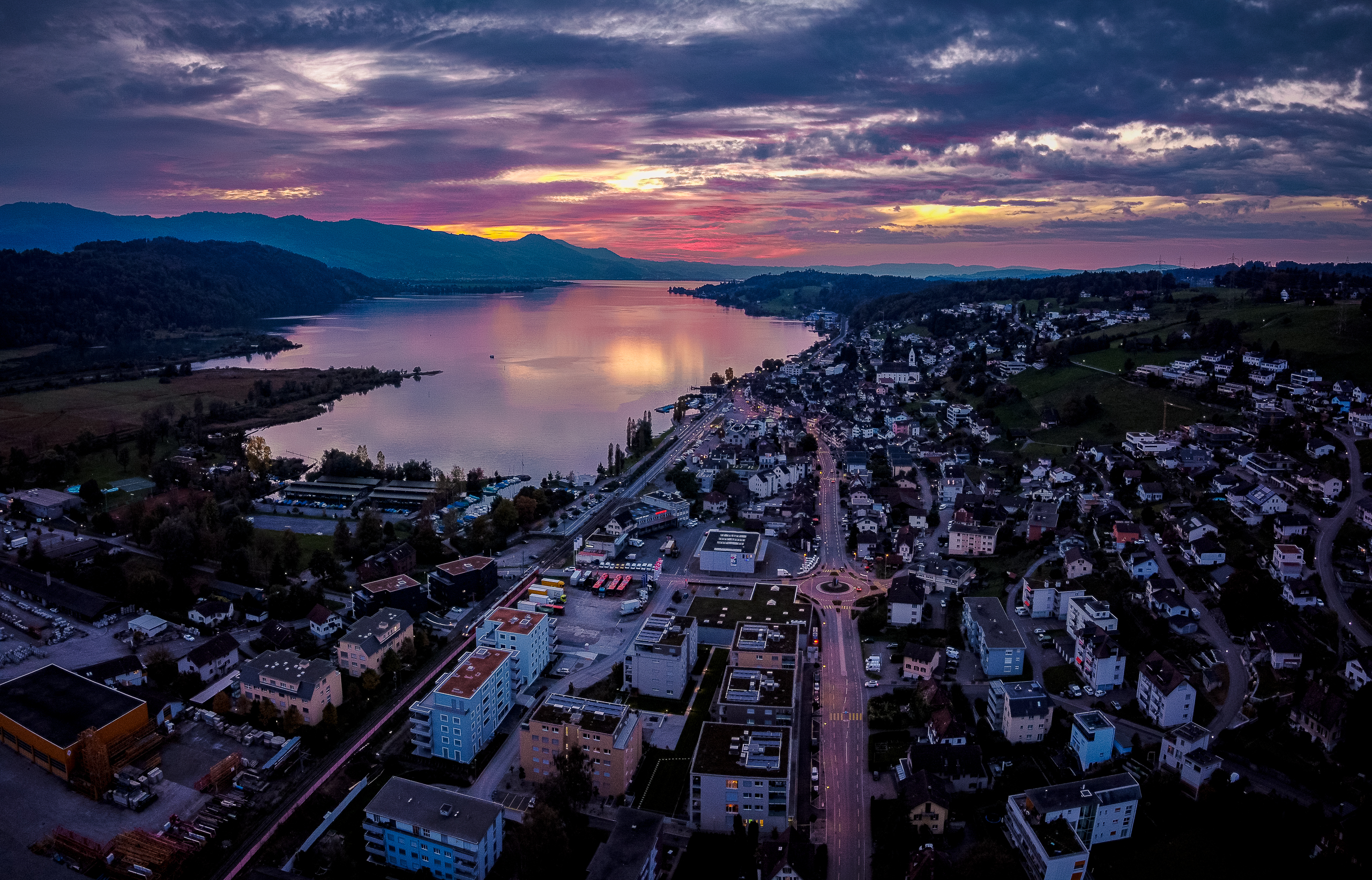
Schmerikon - Obersee view to the east Schmerikon - Obersee view to the east Aerial view of Schmerikon
