= 2002–03 UEFA Cup qualifying round =

The qualifying round of the 2002–03 UEFA Cup was contested from 13 to 29 August 2002. A total of 82 teams participated in this round, which decided 41 of the 96 places in the first round.

== Format ==
In the qualifying round, each tie was played over two legs, with each team playing one leg at home. The team that scored more goals on aggregate over the two legs advanced to the next round. If the aggregate score was level, the away goals rule was applied, i.e., the team that scored more goals away from home over the two legs advanced. If away goals were also equal, then thirty minutes of extra time were played, divided into two fifteen-minute halves. The away goals rule was again applied after extra time, i.e., if there were goals scored during extra time and the aggregate score was still level, the visiting team advanced by virtue of more away goals scored. If no goals were scored during extra time, the tie was decided by penalty shoot-out.

== Teams ==
A total of 82 teams from 44 national associations were involved in the qualifying round, including three teams that qualified via the Fair Play ranking (FP).

Below are the participating teams, sorted by their 2002 UEFA club coefficient (in parentheses).

Key to colours
Winners of qualifying round advanced to first round

Qualifying round participants

| Team | Coeff. |
|---|---|
| (England) Ipswich Town | 32.729 |
| (Israel) Hapoel Tel Aviv | 26.666 |
| (Denmark) Copenhagen | 24.687 |
| (Switzerland) Servette | 24.312 |
| (Croatia) Varteks | 22.520 |
| (Poland) Wisła Kraków | 21.750 |
| (Federal Republic of Yugoslavia) Red Star Belgrade | 18.165 |
| (Czech Republic) Sigma Olomouc | 17.312 |
| (Sweden) IFK Göteborg | 16.620 |
| (Poland) Amica Wronki | 15.750 |
| (Israel) Maccabi Tel Aviv | 15.666 |
| (Russia) Zenit Saint Petersburg | 14.645 |
| (Bulgaria) Litex Lovech | 14.582 |
| (Bulgaria) CSKA Sofia | 14.582 |
| (Czech Republic) Viktoria Žižkov | 14.312 |
| (Portugal) Leixões | 14.124 |
| (Norway) Brann | 13.737 |
| (Croatia) Hajduk Split | 13.520 |
| (Scotland) Aberdeen | 13.062 |
| (Scotland) Livingston | 13.062 |
| (Ukraine) Metalurh Zaporizhzhia | 12.979 |

| Team | Coeff. |
|---|---|
| (Belgium) Mouscron | 12.762 |
| (Norway) Stabæk | 12.737 |
| (Austria) Kärnten | 12.625 |
| (Sweden) AIK | 12.620 |
| (Switzerland) Lugano | 11.312 |
| (Finland) HJK | 11.020 |
| (Romania) Rapid București | 10.958 |
| (Hungary) Ferencváros | 9.874 |
| (Slovenia) Primorje | 8.916 |
| (Slovakia) Matador Púchov | 8.832 |
| (Poland) Polonia Warsaw | 8.750 |
| (Denmark) Midtjylland | 8.687 |
| (Denmark) Odense | 8.687 |
| (Sweden) Djurgårdens IF | 8.620 |
| (Federal Republic of Yugoslavia) Sartid | 8.165 |
| (Hungary) Újpest | 7.874 |
| (Slovakia) Koba Senec | 7.832 |
| (Cyprus) Anorthosis Famagusta | 7.666 |
| (Romania) Național București | 6.958 |
| (Georgia (country)) Dinamo Tbilisi | 6.499 |
| (Slovenia) Gorica | 5.916 |

| Team | Coeff. |
|---|---|
| (Cyprus) AEL Limassol | 4.666 |
| (Latvia) Liepājas Metalurgs | 4.582 |
| (Finland) MYPA | 4.020 |
| (Latvia) Ventspils | 3.582 |
| (Moldova) Zimbru Chișinău | 3.582 |
| (Georgia (country)) Locomotive Tbilisi | 3.499 |
| (Moldova) Nistru Otaci | 2.582 |
| (Iceland) Fylkir | 2.416 |
| (Iceland) ÍBV | 2.416 |
| (Malta) Birkirkara | 2.249 |
| (Belarus) Dinamo Minsk | 2.041 |
| (Belarus) Gomel | 2.041 |
| (Lithuania) Atlantas | 1.915 |
| (Lithuania) Sūduva | 1.915 |
| (Republic of Ireland) Dundalk | 1.665 |
| (Republic of Ireland) Shamrock Rovers | 1.665 |
| (North Macedonia) Pobeda | 1.498 |
| (North Macedonia) Belasica | 1.498 |
| (Malta) Sliema Wanderers | 1.249 |
| (Wales) Bangor City | 0.916 |

| Team | Coeff. |
|---|---|
| (Wales) Total Network Solutions | 0.916 |
| (Estonia) TVMK | 0.832 |
| (Estonia) Levadia Tallinn | 0.832 |
| (Armenia) Zvartnots Yerevan | 0.666 |
| (Armenia) Spartak Yerevan | 0.666 |
| (Bosnia and Herzegovina) Sarajevo | 0.666 |
| (Bosnia and Herzegovina) Široki Brijeg | 0.666 |
| (Northern Ireland) Linfield | 0.665 |
| (Northern Ireland) Glentoran | 0.665 |
| (Faroe Islands) KÍ | 0.582 |
| (Faroe Islands) GÍ | 0.582 |
| (Albania) Tirana | 0.582 |
| (Albania) Partizani | 0.582 |
| (Liechtenstein) Vaduz | 0.500 |
| (Luxembourg) Avenir Beggen | 0.416 |
| (Luxembourg) Grevenmacher | 0.416 |
| (San Marino) Domagnano | 0.000 |
| (Andorra) Encamp | 0.000 |
| (Kazakhstan) Kairat | 0.000 |
| (Kazakhstan) Atyrau | 0.000 |

Notes

1. ^{FP} Qualified via the Fair Play ranking

== Seeding ==
The draw was held on 21 June 2002 in Geneva. Before the draw, teams were divided into seeded and unseeded teams, based on their UEFA club coefficients at the beginning of the season. For convenience of the draw and to avoid pairing of teams from the same association, the teams were further divided into 10 groups (nine groups of eight teams and one group of ten teams), each containing an equal number of seeded and unseeded teams. In the draw, a seeded team from each group was paired with an unseeded team from the same group. The first team to be drawn played the first leg at home.

| Group 1 | | Group 2 | | Group 3 | | Group 4 | |
| Seeded | Unseeded | Seeded | Unseeded | Seeded | Unseeded | Seeded | Unseeded |
|---|---|---|---|---|---|---|---|
| (Poland) Wisła Kraków; (Russia) Zenit Saint Petersburg; (Bulgaria) Litex Lovech; (Slovakia) Matador Púchov | (Lithuania) Atlantas; (Northern Ireland) Glentoran; (Andorra) Encamp; (Kazakhstan) Atyrau | (Israel) Hapoel Tel Aviv; (Switzerland) Lugano; (Slovenia) Primorje; (Denmark) Midtjylland | (Latvia) Ventspils; (North Macedonia) Pobeda; (Armenia) Zvartnots Yerevan; (Albania) Partizani | (Poland) Amica Wronki; (Norway) Brann; (Croatia) Hajduk Split; (Hungary) Ferencváros | (Cyprus) AEL Limassol; (Lithuania) Sūduva; (Wales) Total Network Solutions; (Faroe Islands) GÍ | (Denmark) Copenhagen; (Scotland) Livingston; (Austria) Kärnten; (Poland) Polonia Warsaw | (Latvia) Liepājas Metalurgs; (Georgia (country)) Locomotive Tbilisi; (Malta) Sliema Wanderers; (Liechtenstein) Vaduz |
| Group 5 | | Group 6 | | Group 7 | | Group 8 | |
| Seeded | Unseeded | Seeded | Unseeded | Seeded | Unseeded | Seeded | Unseeded |
| (Israel) Maccabi Tel Aviv; (Portugal) Leixões; (Norway) Stabæk; (Cyprus) Anorthosis Famagusta | (North Macedonia) Belasica; (Estonia) Levadia Tallinn; (Northern Ireland) Linfield; (Luxembourg) Grevenmacher | (Czech Republic) Sigma Olomouc; (Sweden) IFK Göteborg; (Denmark) Odense; (Hungary) Újpest | (Finland) MYPA; (Moldova) Zimbru Chișinău; (Bosnia and Herzegovina) Sarajevo; (Faroe Islands) KÍ | (Switzerland) Servette; (Bulgaria) CSKA Sofia; (Sweden) Djurgårdens IF; (Georgia (country)) Dinamo Tbilisi | (Belarus) Dinamo Minsk; (Republic of Ireland) Shamrock Rovers; (Estonia) TVMK; (Armenia) Spartak Yerevan | (Croatia) Varteks; (Scotland) Aberdeen; (Sweden) AIK; (Finland) HJK | (Moldova) Nistru Otaci; (Iceland) ÍBV; (Belarus) Gomel; (Republic of Ireland) Dundalk |
| Group 9 | | Group 10 | | | | | |
| Seeded | Unseeded | Seeded | Unseeded | | | | |
| (Federal Republic of Yugoslavia) Red Star Belgrade; (Czech Republic) Viktoria Žižkov; (Ukraine) Metalurh Zaporizhzhia; (Romania) Rapid București | (Slovenia) Gorica; (Malta) Birkirkara; (Kazakhstan) Kairat; (San Marino) Domagnano | (England) Ipswich Town; (Belgium) Mouscron; (Federal Republic of Yugoslavia) Sartid; (Slovakia) Koba Senec; (Romania) Național București | (Iceland) Fylkir; (Wales) Bangor City; (Bosnia and Herzegovina) Široki Brijeg; (Albania) Tirana; (Luxembourg) Avenir Beggen | | | | |

== Summary ==
The first legs were played on 13 and 15 August, and the second legs were played on 29 August 2002.

| Team 1 | Agg. | Team 2 | 1st leg | 2nd leg |
|---|---|---|---|---|
| Litex Lovech (Bulgaria) | 8–1 | (Lithuania) Atlantas | 5–0 | 3–1 |
| Encamp (Andorra) | 0–13 | (Russia) Zenit Saint Petersburg | 0–5 | 0–8 |
| Atyrau (Kazakhstan) | 0–2 | (Slovakia) Matador Púchov | 0–0 | 0–2 |
| Glentoran (Northern Ireland) | 0–6 | (Poland) Wisła Kraków | 0–2 | 0–4 |
| Pobeda (North Macedonia) | 2–3 | (Denmark) Midtjylland | 2–0 | 0–3 (a.e.t.) |
| Primorje (Slovenia) | 6–3 | (Armenia) Zvartnots Yerevan | 6–1 | 0–2 |
| Ventspils (Latvia) | 3–1 | (Switzerland) Lugano | 3–0 | 0–1 |
| Hapoel Tel Aviv (Israel) | 5–1 | (Albania) Partizani | 1–0 | 4–1 |
| Ferencváros (Hungary) | 5–2 | (Cyprus) AEL Limassol | 4–0 | 1–2 |
| Hajduk Split (Croatia) | 11–0 | (Faroe Islands) GÍ | 3–0 | 8–0 |
| Brann (Norway) | 4–6 | (Lithuania) Sūduva | 2–3 | 2–3 |
| Amica Wronki (Poland) | 12–2 | (Wales) Total Network Solutions | 5–0 | 7–2 |
| Copenhagen (Denmark) | 7–2 | (Georgia (country)) Locomotive Tbilisi | 3–1 | 4–1 |
| Liepājas Metalurgs (Latvia) | 2–6 | (Austria) Kärnten | 0–2 | 2–4 |
| Vaduz (Liechtenstein) | 1–1 (a) | (Scotland) Livingston | 1–1 | 0–0 |
| Sliema Wanderers (Malta) | 1–5 | (Poland) Polonia Warsaw | 1–3 | 0–2 |
| Anorthosis Famagusta (Cyprus) | 3–2 | (Luxembourg) Grevenmacher | 3–0 | 0–2 |
| Levadia Tallinn (Estonia) | 0–4 | (Israel) Maccabi Tel Aviv | 0–2 | 0–2 |
| Leixões (Portugal) | 4–3 | (North Macedonia) Belasica | 2–2 | 2–1 |
| Sigma Olomouc (Czech Republic) | 3–3 (3–5 p) | (Bosnia and Herzegovina) Sarajevo | 2–1 | 1–2 (a.e.t.) |
| Zimbru Chișinău (Moldova) | 5–3 | (Sweden) IFK Göteborg | 3–1 | 2–2 |
| KÍ (Faroe Islands) | 2–3 | (Hungary) Újpest | 2–2 | 0–1 |
| MYPA (Finland) | 1–2 | (Denmark) Odense | 1–0 | 0–2 |
| Dinamo Minsk (Belarus) | 1–5 | (Bulgaria) CSKA Sofia | 1–4 | 0–1 |
| Dinamo Tbilisi (Georgia (country)) | 5–1 | (Estonia) TVMK | 4–1 | 1–0 |
| Spartak Yerevan (Armenia) | 0–5 | (Switzerland) Servette | 0–2 | 0–3 |
| Shamrock Rovers (Republic of Ireland) | 1–5 | (Sweden) Djurgårdens IF | 1–3 | 0–2 |
| Varteks (Croatia) | 9–0 | (Republic of Ireland) Dundalk | 5–0 | 4–0 |
| Gomel (Belarus) | 5–0 | (Finland) HJK | 1–0 | 4–0 |
| Aberdeen (Scotland) | 1–0 | (Moldova) Nistru Otaci | 1–0 | 0–0 |
| AIK (Sweden) | 5–1 | (Iceland) ÍBV | 2–0 | 3–1 |
| Rapid București (Romania) | 5–1 | (Slovenia) Gorica | 2–0 | 3–1 |
| Domagnano (San Marino) | 0–5 | (Czech Republic) Viktoria Žižkov | 0–2 | 0–3 |
| Kairat (Kazakhstan) | 0–5 | (Federal Republic of Yugoslavia) Red Star Belgrade | 0–2 | 0–3 |
| Metalurh Zaporizhzhia (Ukraine) | 3–0 | (Malta) Birkirkara | 3–0 | 0–0 |
| Bangor City (Wales) | 1–2 | (Federal Republic of Yugoslavia) Sartid | 1–0 | 0–2 |
| Koba Senec (Slovakia) | 1–5 | (Bosnia and Herzegovina) Široki Brijeg | 1–2 | 0–3 |
| Tirana (Albania) | 2–3 | (Romania) Național București | 0–1 | 2–2 |
| Avenir Beggen (Luxembourg) | 1–9 | (England) Ipswich Town | 0–1 | 1–8 |
| Fylkir (Iceland) | 2–4 | (Belgium) Mouscron | 1–1 | 1–3 |
| Stabæk (Norway) | 5–1 | (Northern Ireland) Linfield | 4–0 | 1–1 |

== Matches ==
15 August 2002
19:45

| Litex Lovech (Bulgaria) | 5–0 | (Lithuania) Atlantas |
|---|---|---|
| Nikolov 38'; Stoilov 58'; Yovov 70', 75'; Rusev 79' | Report |

Lovech Stadium, Lovech
Attendance: 2,128
Referee: Srečko Kandare (Slovenia)
29 August 2002
16:00

| Atlantas (Lithuania) | 1–3 | (Bulgaria) Litex Lovech |
|---|---|---|
| Tamošauskas 12' | Report | Rusev 50'; Hdiouad 62' (pen.); Jelenković 66' |

Klaipėdos centrinis stadionas, Klaipėda
Attendance: 1,923
Referee: Miroslaw Ryszka (Poland)

Litex Lovech won 8–1 on aggregate.

15 August 2002
17:00

| Encamp (Andorra) | 0–5 | (Russia) Zenit Saint Petersburg |
|---|---|---|
| | Report | Arshavin 3', 52'; Spivak 60' (pen.); Makarov 65'; Osipov 75' |

Estadi Comunal, Andorra la Vella
Attendance: 700
Referee: Ceri Richards (Wales)
29 August 2002
17:00

| Zenit Saint Petersburg (Russia) | 8–0 | (Andorra) Encamp |
|---|---|---|
| Osipov 14', 69'; Ranđelović 21', 71', 73'; Spivak 57'; Miceika 86'; Nikolayev 89' | Report |

Petrovsky Stadium, Saint Petersburg
Attendance: 15,500
Referee: Costas Theodotou (Cyprus)

Zenit Saint Petersburg won 13–0 on aggregate.

15 August 2002
16:00

| Atyrau (Kazakhstan) | 0–0 | (Slovakia) Matador Púchov |
|---|---|---|
| | Report |

Munaishy Stadium, Atyrau
Attendance: 8,600
Referee: Rob Styles (England)
29 August 2002
17:00

| Matador Púchov (Slovakia) | 2–0 | (Kazakhstan) Atyrau |
|---|---|---|
| Breška 51'; Štrba 90' | Report |

Mestský štadión, Púchov
Attendance: 4,164
Referee: Dejan Delević (FR Yugoslavia)

Matador Púchov won 2–0 on aggregate.

15 August 2002
20:00

| Glentoran (Northern Ireland) | 0–2 | (Poland) Wisła Kraków |
|---|---|---|
| | Report | Żurawski 74' (pen.); Dubicki 88' |

The Oval, Belfast
Attendance: 3,115
Referee: Ladislav Gádoši (Slovakia)
29 August 2002
18:00

| Wisła Kraków (Poland) | 4–0 | (Northern Ireland) Glentoran |
|---|---|---|
| Kuźba 19', 59'; Uche 74', 80' | Report |

Stadion Miejski, Kraków
Attendance: 2,600
Referee: Igor Ishchenko (Ukraine)

Wisła Kraków won 6–0 on aggregate.

15 August 2002
17:00

| Pobeda (North Macedonia) | 2–0 | (Denmark) Midtjylland |
|---|---|---|
| Nielsen 35' (o.g.); Krstev 70' | Report |

Stadion Goce Delčev, Prilep
Attendance: 4,000
Referee: Stefan Messner (Austria)
29 August 2002
20:05

| Midtjylland (Denmark) | 3–0 (a.e.t.) | (North Macedonia) Pobeda |
|---|---|---|
| Pimpong 59'; Kristensen 79'; Jessen 115' | Report |

Silkeborg Stadion, Silkeborg
Attendance: 1,244
Referee: José Mendes Pratas (Portugal)

Midtjylland won 3–2 on aggregate.

15 August 2002
17:00

| Primorje (Slovenia) | 6–1 | (Armenia) Zvartnots Yerevan |
|---|---|---|
| Gregorič 31'; Zatkovič 49', 72', 74', 89'; Ranić 68' | Report | Davityan 82' |

City Stadium, Ajdovščina
Attendance: 550
Referee: Andrejs Sipailo (Latvia)
29 August 2002
16:00

| Zvartnots Yerevan (Armenia) | 2–0 | (Slovenia) Primorje |
|---|---|---|
| Nazaryan 53' (pen.); Avanesyan 78' | Report |

Vazgen Sargsyan Republican Stadium, Yerevan
Attendance: 2,800
Referee: Ferenc Bede (Hungary)

Primorje won 6–3 on aggregate.

15 August 2002
17:00

| Ventspils (Latvia) | 3–0 | (Switzerland) Lugano |
|---|---|---|
| Landyrev 40', 67'; Rimkus 58' | Report |

Ventspils Olimpiskais Stadions, Ventspils
Attendance: 1,200
Referee: Peter Fröjdfeldt (Sweden)
29 August 2002
20:00

| Lugano (Switzerland) | 1–0 | (Latvia) Ventspils |
|---|---|---|
| Andreoli 56' | Report |

Cornaredo Stadium, Lugano
Attendance: 4,200
Referee: Dejan Stanišić (FR Yugoslavia)

Ventspils won 3–1 on aggregate.

15 August 2002
19:00

| Hapoel Tel Aviv (Israel) | 1–0 | (Albania) Partizani |
|---|---|---|
| Abukasis 49' | Report |

Georgi Asparuhov Stadium, Sofia, Bulgaria (Note: Due to security issues caused by the Second Intifada, Israeli teams were required to play their home matches at neutral venues until further notice.)
Attendance: 200
Referee: Viorel Anghelinei (Romania)
29 August 2002
19:00

| Partizani (Albania) | 1–4 | (Israel) Hapoel Tel Aviv |
|---|---|---|
| Marcelo 35' | Report | Afek 28'; Balili 73', 83'; Udi 87' |

Qemal Stafa Stadium, Tirana
Attendance: 4,000
Referee: Ruud Bossen (Netherlands)

Hapoel Tel Aviv won 5–1 on aggregate.

15 August 2002
20:15

| Ferencváros (Hungary) | 4–0 | (Cyprus) AEL Limassol |
|---|---|---|
| Tököli 10', 11'; Gera 55'; Szkukalek 58' | Report |

Üllői úti stadion, Budapest
Attendance: 10,468
Referee: Anton Guenov (Bulgaria)
29 August 2002
18:30

| AEL Limassol (Cyprus) | 2–1 | (Hungary) Ferencváros |
|---|---|---|
| Kyriakou 29'; Sebők 86' | Report | Lipcsei 90' |

Tsirion Stadium, Limassol
Attendance: 3,500
Referee: Sašo Lazarevski (Macedonia)

Ferencváros won 5–2 on aggregate.

15 August 2002
20:30

| Hajduk Split (Croatia) | 3–0 | (Faroe Islands) GÍ |
|---|---|---|
| Đolonga 22'; Pletikosa 60' (pen.); Deranja 84' | Report |

Stadion Poljud, Split
Attendance: 4,146
Referee: Vladimir Antonov (Moldova)
29 August 2002
19:00

| GÍ (Faroe Islands) | 0–8 | (Croatia) Hajduk Split |
|---|---|---|
| | Report | Erceg 12', 16', 78'; Andrić 23', 35'; Pletikosa 45+1' (pen.); Carević 46', 85' |

Tórsvøllur, Tórshavn
Attendance: 230
Referee: Igor Yarmenchuk (Ukraine)

Hajduk Split won 11–0 on aggregate.

15 August 2002
19:00

| Brann (Norway) | 2–3 | (Lithuania) Sūduva |
|---|---|---|
| Knudsen 45'; Furuseth 58' | Report | Zitinskas 8', 20'; Radzinevičius 18' |

Brann Stadion, Bergen
Attendance: 1,761
Referee: David Malcolm (Northern Ireland)
29 August 2002
20:30

| Sūduva (Lithuania) | 3–2 | (Norway) Brann |
|---|---|---|
| Radzinevičius 3', 30', 41' | Report | Nhleko 16', 45' |

Darius and Girėnas Stadium, Kaunas
Attendance: 2,300
Referee: Drago Kos (Slovenia)

Sūduva won 6–4 on aggregate.

15 August 2002
16:00

| Amica Wronki (Poland) | 5–0 | (Wales) Total Network Solutions |
|---|---|---|
| Bieniuk 35'; Dembiński 57'; Król 64'; Dawidowski 80', 88' | Report |

Stadion Amica, Wronki
Attendance: 1,200
Referee: Sorin Altmayer (Romania)
29 August 2002
21:00

| Total Network Solutions (Wales) | 2–7 | (Poland) Amica Wronki |
|---|---|---|
| Anthrobus 20'; Toner 28' | Report | Król 26', 71', 85'; Burkhardt 34', 75'; Sobociński 66'; Łudziński 87' |

Latham Park, Newtown
Attendance: 1,002
Referee: Loizos Loizou (Cyprus)

Amica Wronki won 12–2 on aggregate.

15 August 2002
19:05

| Copenhagen (Denmark) | 3–1 | (Georgia (country)) Locomotive Tbilisi |
|---|---|---|
| Jónsson 42', 54'; Røll 47' | Report | Janashia 9' |

Parken Stadium, Copenhagen
Attendance: 10,692
Referee: Karel Vidlák (Czech Republic)
29 August 2002
16:00

| Locomotive Tbilisi (Georgia (country)) | 1–4 | (Denmark) Copenhagen |
|---|---|---|
| Janashia 9' | Report | Zuma 23'; Pettersson 68', 72'; Jónsson 80' |

Mikheil Meskhi Stadium, Tbilisi
Attendance: 5,650
Referee: Georgios Douros (Greece)

Copenhagen won 7–2 on aggregate.

15 August 2002
17:00

| Liepājas Metalurgs (Latvia) | 0–2 | (Austria) Kärnten |
|---|---|---|
| | Report | Marić 57'; Bubalo 77' |

Skonto Stadium, Riga
Attendance: 1,900
Referee: John Feighery (Republic of Ireland)
29 August 2002
18:00

| Kärnten (Austria) | 4–2 | (Latvia) Liepājas Metalurgs |
|---|---|---|
| Ambrosius 11', 53', 72'; Bubalo 62' | Report | Katasonov 18'; Ivanovs 83' |

Wörthersee Stadion, Klagenfurt
Attendance: 3,400
Referee: Zsolt Szabó (Hungary)

Kärnten won 6–2 on aggregate.

13 August 2002
18:00

| Vaduz (Liechtenstein) | 1–1 | (Scotland) Livingston |
|---|---|---|
| Burgmeier 61' | Report | Rubio 51' |

Rheinpark Stadion, Vaduz
Attendance: 1,300
Referee: Siniša Zrnić (Bosnia and Herzegovina)
29 August 2002
20:30

| Livingston (Scotland) | 0–0 | (Liechtenstein) Vaduz |
|---|---|---|
| | Report |

Almondvale Stadium, Livingston
Attendance: 7,419
Referee: Ivan Novak (Croatia)

1–1 on aggregate; Livingston won on away goals.

15 August 2002
18:00

| Sliema Wanderers (Malta) | 1–3 | (Poland) Polonia Warsaw |
|---|---|---|
| Bizu 90' | Report | Bartczak 53'; Bąk 71'; Udenkwor 86' |

Ta' Qali National Stadium, Ta' Qali
Attendance: 500
Referee: Meir Levi (Israel)
29 August 2002
16:00

| Polonia Warsaw (Poland) | 2–0 | (Malta) Sliema Wanderers |
|---|---|---|
| Bąk 4'; Bartczak 39' | Report |

Stadion Polonii, Warsaw
Attendance: 159
Referee: Nikolay Ivanov (Russia)

Polonia Warsaw won 5–1 on aggregate.

15 August 2002
19:00

| Anorthosis Famagusta (Cyprus) | 3–0 | (Luxembourg) Grevenmacher |
|---|---|---|
| Piekarski 21'; Kowalczyk 43'; Xiourouppas 80' (pen.) | Report |

GSP Stadium, Nicosia
Attendance: 4,153
Referee: Valeriy Velichko (Belarus)
29 August 2002
20:00

| Grevenmacher (Luxembourg) | 2–0 | (Cyprus) Anorthosis Famagusta |
|---|---|---|
| Manzangala 34'; Albrecht 87' | Report |

Stade Josy Barthel, Luxembourg City
Attendance: 389
Referee: Haim Yaakov (Israel)

Anorthosis Famagusta won 3–2 on aggregate.

15 August 2002
18:00

| Levadia Tallinn (Estonia) | 0–2 | (Israel) Maccabi Tel Aviv |
|---|---|---|
| | Report | Prohorenkovs 4'; Strool 22' |

Kadriorg Stadium, Tallinn
Attendance: 500
Referee: Wolfgang Sowa (Austria)
29 August 2002
19:30

| Maccabi Tel Aviv (Israel) | 2–0 | (Estonia) Levadia Tallinn |
|---|---|---|
| Pasins 70' (o.g.); Prohorenkovs 84' | Report |

Georgi Asparuhov Stadium, Sofia, Bulgaria
Attendance: 100
Referee: Jozef Kačenga (Slovakia)

Maccabi Tel Aviv won 3–2 on aggregate.

15 August 2002
19:00

| Leixões (Portugal) | 2–2 | (North Macedonia) Belasica |
|---|---|---|
| Antchouet 60'; Carlos Brito 75' | Report | Ahmetović 53', 55' |

Estádio do Mar, Matosinhos
Attendance: 4,023
Referee: Roberto Rosetti (Italy)
29 August 2002
20:30

| Belasica (North Macedonia) | 1–2 | (Portugal) Leixões |
|---|---|---|
| Baldovaliev 80' | Report | Carlos Brito 34'; Nenê 73' |

Stadion Mladost, Strumica
Attendance: 3,020
Referee: Steve Dunn (England)

Leixões won 4–3 on aggregate.

15 August 2002
20:00

| Sigma Olomouc (Czech Republic) | 2–1 | (Bosnia and Herzegovina) Sarajevo |
|---|---|---|
| Putík 45'; Ekwueme 75' | Report | Osmanhodžić 30' |

Andrův stadion, Olomouc
Attendance: 5,378
Referee: Karen Nalbandyan (Armenia)
29 August 2002
20:30

| Sarajevo (Bosnia and Herzegovina) | 2–1 (a.e.t.) | (Czech Republic) Sigma Olomouc |
|---|---|---|
| Obuća 53'; Osmanhodžić 78' | Report | Putík 10' |
Penalties
| Pelak (penalty scored); Osmanhodžić (penalty scored); Kurto (penalty scored); Ihtijarević (penalty scored); Krupinac (penalty scored) | 5–3 | (penalty missed) Caha; (penalty scored) Urbánek; (penalty scored) Reiter; (penalty scored) Rozehnal |

Koševo Stadium, Sarajevo
Attendance: 9,800
Referee: Aleksey Tyumin (Russia)

2–2 on aggregate; Sarajevo won 5–3 on penalties.

15 August 2002
19:30

| Zimbru Chișinău (Moldova) | 3–1 | (Sweden) IFK Göteborg |
|---|---|---|
| Frunză 22', 37'; Gvazava 28' | Report | Henriksson 36' |

Stadionul Republican, Chișinău
Attendance: 6,242
Referee: Johan Verbist (Belgium)
29 August 2002
19:00

| IFK Göteborg (Sweden) | 2–2 | (Moldova) Zimbru Chișinău |
|---|---|---|
| Rosenkvist 29', 39' | Report | Gvazava 34'; Cebotari 35' |

Gamla Ullevi, Gothenburg
Attendance: 2,109
Referee: Florian Meyer (Germany)

Zimbru Chișinău won 5–3 on aggregate.

15 August 2002
18:15

| KÍ (Faroe Islands) | 2–2 | (Hungary) Újpest |
|---|---|---|
| Mørkøre 45', 53' | Report | Juhár 14'; Farkas 68' |

Svangaskarð, Toftir
Attendance: 460
Referee: Hubert Byrne (Republic of Ireland)
29 August 2002
20:15

| Újpest (Hungary) | 1–0 | (Faroe Islands) KÍ |
|---|---|---|
| Horváth 37' | Report |

Megyeri úti Stadion, Budapest
Attendance: 4,035
Referee: Darius Miezelis (Lithuania)

Újpest won 3–2 on aggregate.

15 August 2002
18:00

| MYPA (Finland) | 1–0 | (Denmark) Odense |
|---|---|---|
| Manso 16' | Report |

Saviniemen Jalkapallostadion, Anjalankoski
Attendance: 1,879
Referee: Michael Weiner (Germany)
29 August 2002
20:45

| Odense (Denmark) | 2–0 | (Finland) MYPA |
|---|---|---|
| Miti 63', 90' | Report |

Odense Stadion, Odense
Attendance: 5,616
Referee: Emil Bozinovski (Macedonia)

Odense won 2–1 on aggregate.

15 August 2002
18:00

| Dinamo Minsk (Belarus) | 1–4 | (Bulgaria) CSKA Sofia |
|---|---|---|
| Tsyhalka 66' | Report | Mukasi 18'; Dimitrov 28', 47'; Brito 31' |

Dinamo Stadium, Minsk
Attendance: 3,562
Referee: René Rogalla (Switzerland)
29 August 2002
19:30

| CSKA Sofia (Bulgaria) | 1–0 | (Belarus) Dinamo Minsk |
|---|---|---|
| Šakiri 64' (pen.) | Report |

Balgarska Armiya Stadium, Sofia
Attendance: 3,254
Referee: Bertrand Layec (France)

CSKA Sofia won 5–1 on aggregate.

15 August 2002
17:00

| Dinamo Tbilisi (Georgia (country)) | 4–1 | (Estonia) TVMK |
|---|---|---|
| Pinha 6'; Daraselia 14'; Shashiashvili 43', 49' | Report | Leetma 75' |

Boris Paichadze National Stadium, Tbilisi
Attendance: 2,350
Referee: Jaromír Hlaváč (Czech Republic)
29 August 2002
18:00

| TVMK (Estonia) | 0–1 | (Georgia (country)) Dinamo Tbilisi |
|---|---|---|
| | Report | Akhalaia 74' |

Lilleküla Stadium, Tallinn
Attendance: 1,100
Referee: Espen Berntsen (Norway)

Dinamo Tbilisi won 5–1 on aggregate.

15 August 2002
15:00

| Spartak Yerevan (Armenia) | 0–2 | (Switzerland) Servette |
|---|---|---|
| | Report | Kader 72', 84' |

Vazgen Sargsyan Republican Stadium, Yerevan
Attendance: 7,000
Referee: Krzysztof Słupik (Poland)
29 August 2002
19:30

| Servette (Switzerland) | 3–0 | (Armenia) Spartak Yerevan |
|---|---|---|
| Diogo 38', 43'; Frei 77' | Report |

Charmilles Stadium, Geneva
Attendance: 2,200
Referee: Anthony Zammit (Malta)

Servette won 5–0 on aggregate.

15 August 2002
20:45

| Shamrock Rovers (Republic of Ireland) | 1–3 | (Sweden) Djurgårdens IF |
|---|---|---|
| McGuinness 50' | Report | Wowoah 23'; Stefanidis 52'; Källström 69' |

Tolka Park, Dublin
Attendance: 2,650
Referee: Luis Medina Cantalejo (Spain)
29 August 2002
20:45

| Djurgårdens IF (Sweden) | 2–0 | (Republic of Ireland) Shamrock Rovers |
|---|---|---|
| Wowoah 19'; Chanko 21' | Report |

Råsunda Stadium, Solna
Attendance: 7,723
Referee: Sten Kaldma (Estonia)

Djurgårdens IF won 5–1 on aggregate.

15 August 2002
18:30

| Varteks (Croatia) | 5–0 | (Republic of Ireland) Dundalk |
|---|---|---|
| Huljev 28'; Hrman 32'; Mumlek 60'; Karić 69'; Sklepić 90' | Report |

Stadion Varteks, Varaždin
Attendance: 1,100
Referee: Athanassios Briakos (Greece)
29 August 2002
20:30

| Dundalk (Republic of Ireland) | 0–4 | (Croatia) Varteks |
|---|---|---|
| | Report | Kristić 21'; Halilović 50'; Huljev 69'; Fumić 79' |

Tolka Park, Dublin
Attendance: 410
Referee: Petteri Kari (Finland)

Varteks won 9–0 on aggregate.

15 August 2002
16:30

| Gomel (Belarus) | 1–0 | (Finland) HJK |
|---|---|---|
| Borel 60' | Report |

Yunost Stadium, Mozyr
Attendance: 1,200
Referee: Bülent Uzun (Turkey)
29 August 2002
18:00

| HJK (Finland) | 0–4 | (Belarus) Gomel |
|---|---|---|
| | Report | Nazarov 32'; Bliznyuk 55', 59'; Razumaw 62' |

Finnair Stadium, Helsinki
Attendance: 2,156
Referee: Pasquale Rodomonti (Italy)

Gomel won 5–0 on aggregate.

15 August 2002
20:45

| Aberdeen (Scotland) | 1–0 | (Moldova) Nistru Otaci |
|---|---|---|
| Mackie 59' | Report |

Pittodrie Stadium, Aberdeen
Attendance: 9,894
Referee: Tonny Kolbech Poulsen (Denmark)
29 August 2002
18:00

| Nistru Otaci (Moldova) | 0–0 | (Scotland) Aberdeen |
|---|---|---|
| | Report |

Stadionul Republican, Chișinău
Attendance: 3,000
Referee: Mustafa Çulcu (Turkey)

Aberdeen won 1–0 on aggregate.

15 August 2002
19:00

| AIK (Sweden) | 2–0 | (Iceland) ÍBV |
|---|---|---|
| Hoch 27'; Nordin 87' | Report |

Råsunda Stadium, Solna
Attendance: 6,683
Referee: Jack van Hulten (Netherlands)
29 August 2002
19:30

| ÍBV (Iceland) | 1–3 | (Sweden) AIK |
|---|---|---|
| Þorvaldsson 3' | Report | Rubarth 9'; Hoch 45', 66' |

Hásteinsvöllur, Vestmannaeyjar
Attendance: 534
Referee: Guido Wildhaber (Switzerland)

AIK won 5–1 on aggregate.

15 August 2002
20:00

| Rapid București (Romania) | 2–0 | (Slovenia) Gorica |
|---|---|---|
| Schumacher 17', 71' (pen.) | Report |

Stadionul Giulești-Valentin Stănescu, Bucharest
Attendance: 3,615
Referee: Bruno Coué (France)
29 August 2002
16:30

| Gorica (Slovenia) | 1–3 | (Romania) Rapid București |
|---|---|---|
| Perjă 85' (o.g.) | Report | Godfroid 3'; Schumacher 14', 45' |

Športni Park, Nova Gorica
Attendance: 606
Referee: Martin Hansson (Sweden)

Rapid București won 5–1 on aggregate.

15 August 2002
20:30

| Domagnano (San Marino) | 0–2 | (Czech Republic) Viktoria Žižkov |
|---|---|---|
| | Report | Sabou 27'; Stracený 80' |

Stadio Olimpico, Serravalle
Attendance: 670
Referee: Sokol Jareci (Albania)
29 August 2002
17:30

| Viktoria Žižkov (Czech Republic) | 3–0 | (San Marino) Domagnano |
|---|---|---|
| Chihuri 2'; Janoušek 43'; Krutý 69' | Report |

Stadion Evžena Rošického, Prague
Attendance: 640
Referee: Bragi Bergmann (Iceland)

Viktoria Žižkov won 5–0 on aggregate.

15 August 2002
14:30

| Kairat (Kazakhstan) | 0–2 | (Federal Republic of Yugoslavia) Red Star Belgrade |
|---|---|---|
| | Report | Bogdanović 43'; Mrđa 66' |

Central Stadium, Almaty
Attendance: 15,000
Referee: Dougie McDonald (Scotland)
29 August 2002
20:00

| Red Star Belgrade (Federal Republic of Yugoslavia) | 3–0 | (Kazakhstan) Kairat |
|---|---|---|
| Gvozdenović 19'; Pjanović 44'; Krivokapić 73' | Report |

Red Star Stadium, Belgrade
Attendance: 5,495
Referee: Johnny Ver Eecke (Belgium)

Red Star Belgrade won 5–0 on aggregate.

15 August 2002
20:20

| Metalurh Zaporizhzhia (Ukraine) | 3–0 | (Malta) Birkirkara |
|---|---|---|
| Akopyan 17'; Iliev 58'; Brđanin 68' | Report |

Meteor Stadium, Dnipropetrovsk (Note: Metalurh Zaporizhzhia played their home match at Meteor Stadium, Dnipropetrovsk, instead of their regular stadium Metalurh Stadium, Zaporizhia, due to renovation.)
Attendance: 4,000
Referee: Merab Malaguradze (Georgia)
29 August 2002
21:45

| Birkirkara (Malta) | 0–0 | (Ukraine) Metalurh Zaporizhzhia |
|---|---|---|
| | Report |

National Stadium, Ta' Qali
Attendance: 615
Referee: Robert Johnsdorf (Luxembourg)

Metalurh Zaporizhzhia won 5–0 on aggregate.

15 August 2002
20:30

| Bangor City (Wales) | 1–0 | (Federal Republic of Yugoslavia) Sartid |
|---|---|---|
| Roberts 69' | Report |

Racecourse Ground, Wrexham
Attendance: 738
Referee: Sergey Shmolik (Belarus)
29 August 2002
17:00

| Sartid (Federal Republic of Yugoslavia) | 2–0 | (Wales) Bangor City |
|---|---|---|
| Zečević 14'; Mirosavljević 58' | Report |

Fortress Stadium, Smederevo
Attendance: 9,357
Referee: Knud Stadsgaard (Denmark)

Sartid won 2–1 on aggregate.

15 August 2002
18:00

| Koba Senec (Slovakia) | 1–2 | (Bosnia and Herzegovina) Široki Brijeg |
|---|---|---|
| Juška 11' | Report | Katić 31', 70' |

Tehelné pole, Bratislava
Attendance: 1,500
Referee: Asim Khudiev (Azerbaijan)
29 August 2002
20:15

| Široki Brijeg (Bosnia and Herzegovina) | 3–0 | (Slovakia) Koba Senec |
|---|---|---|
| Erceg 13'; Hrgović 49', 73' | Report |

Stadion Pecara, Široki Brijeg
Attendance: 2,500
Referee: Michael Ross (Northern Ireland)

Široki Brijeg won 5–1 on aggregate.

15 August 2002
19:00

| Tirana (Albania) | 0–1 | (Romania) Național București |
|---|---|---|
| | Report | Radu 33' (pen.) |

Selman Stërmasi Stadium, Tirana
Attendance: 8,000
Referee: Joseph Attard (Malta)
29 August 2002
20:00

| Național București (Romania) | 2–2 | (Albania) Tirana |
|---|---|---|
| Ilie 29'; Radu 60' | Report | Merkoçi 8'; Zaccanti 68' |

Stadionul Cotroceni, București
Attendance: 6,000
Referee: Mika Peltola (Finland)

Național București won 3–2 on aggregate.

15 August 2002
20:00

| Avenir Beggen (Luxembourg) | 0–1 | (England) Ipswich Town |
|---|---|---|
| | Report | Stewart 90' |

Stade Josy Barthel, Luxembourg City
Attendance: 2,971
Referee: Kamen Alexiev (Bulgaria)
29 August 2002
20:45

| Ipswich Town (England) | 8–1 | (Luxembourg) Avenir Beggen |
|---|---|---|
| Miller 3', 19'; Couñago 18', 75'; Ney 21' (o.g.); Brown 42'; McGreal 62'; Ambrose 80' | Report | Molitor 56' |

Portman Road, Ipswich
Attendance: 17,462
Referee: Tommy Skjerven (Norway)

Ipswich Town won 9–1 on aggregate.

15 August 2002
20:00

| Fylkir (Iceland) | 1–1 | (Belgium) Mouscron |
|---|---|---|
| Sverrisson 59' (pen.) | Report | Grégoire 26' |

Laugardalsvöllur, Reykjavík
Attendance: 1,083
Referee: Alan Freeland (Scotland)
29 August 2002
20:00

| Mouscron (Belgium) | 3–1 | (Iceland) Fylkir |
|---|---|---|
| Dugardein 36'; Bakadal 45'; Grégoire 56' | Report | Ásbjörnsson 45' |

Stade Le Canonnier, Mouscron
Attendance: 6,600
Referee: Goran Marić (Croatia)

Mouscron won 4–2 on aggregate.

15 August 2002
19:00

| Stabæk (Norway) | 4–0 | (Northern Ireland) Linfield |
|---|---|---|
| Finstad 13'; Gudmundsson 17', 87'; Baldvinsson 75' | Report |

Nadderud Stadion, Bærum
Attendance: 1,145
Referee: Julian Rodriguez Santiago (Spain)
29 August 2002
20:45

| Linfield (Northern Ireland) | 1–1 | (Norway) Stabæk |
|---|---|---|
| Ferguson 44' | Report | Gudmundsson 81' |

Windsor Park, Belfast
Attendance: 1,146
Referee: Antonio Manuel Almeida Costa (Portugal)

Stabæk won 5–1 on aggregate.
