= 2002–03 UEFA Cup second round =

The second round of the 2002–03 UEFA Cup was contested between 29 October and 14 November 2002. A total of 48 teams participated in this round, with the 24 winners joining the eight Champions League group stage third-placed teams in the third round.

All times are CET (UTC+1), as listed by UEFA.

== Format ==
In the second round, each tie was played over two legs, with each team playing one leg at home. The team that scored more goals on aggregate over the two legs advanced to the next round. If the aggregate score was level, the away goals rule was applied, i.e., the team that scored more goals away from home over the two legs advanced. If away goals were also equal, then thirty minutes of extra time were played, divided into two fifteen-minute halves. The away goals rule was again applied after extra time, i.e., if there were goals scored during extra time and the aggregate score was still level, the visiting team advanced by virtue of more away goals scored. If no goals were scored during extra time, the tie was decided by penalty shoot-out.

== Teams ==
A total of 48 teams contested this round, all of which advanced from the first round.

Key to colours
Winners of second round advanced to third round

Second round participants

Team	Coeff.
(Italy) Lazio	106.334
(Italy) Parma	91.334
(England) Leeds United	76.729
(Spain) Celta Vigo	76.233
(Portugal) Porto	66.124
(France) Bordeaux	63.176
(Greece) Panathinaikos	57.058
(Spain) Alavés	55.233
(Germany) VfB Stuttgart	53.495
(Germany) Hertha BSC	52.495
(France) Paris Saint-Germain	51.176
(Spain) Real Betis	49.233

Team	Coeff.
(Czech Republic) Sparta Prague	48.312
(Czech Republic) Slavia Prague	47.312
(Germany) Schalke 04	46.495
(Germany) Werder Bremen	46.495
(Greece) PAOK	41.058
(Belgium) Anderlecht	38.762
(Austria) Sturm Graz	37.625
(Portugal) Boavista	36.124
(Scotland) Celtic	36.062
(England) Ipswich Town	35.729
(Croatia) Dinamo Zagreb	35.520
(Spain) Málaga	34.233

Team	Coeff.
(Netherlands) Vitesse	30.082
(Switzerland) Grasshopper	29.312
(Czech Republic) Slovan Liberec	29.312
(England) Blackburn Rovers	28.729
(England) Fulham	27.729
(Israel) Hapoel Tel Aviv	26.666
(Turkey) Beşiktaş	26.362
(Poland) Wisła Kraków	21.750
(Turkey) Fenerbahçe	19.362
(Federal Republic of Yugoslavia) Red Star Belgrade	18.165
(Poland) Legia Warsaw	17.750
(Norway) Viking	17.737

Team	Coeff.
(Poland) Amica Wronki	15.750
(Turkey) Denizlispor	14.362
(Czech Republic) Viktoria Žižkov	14.312
(Federal Republic of Yugoslavia) Partizan	14.165
Austria Wien	11.625
(Bulgaria) Levski Sofia	11.582
(Hungary) Ferencváros	9.874
(Denmark) Midtjylland	8.687
(Sweden) Djurgårdens IF	8.620
(Cyprus) Anorthosis Famagusta	7.666
(Romania) Național București	6.958
(Cyprus) APOEL	4.666

== Seeding ==
The draw was held on 8 October 2002 in Nyon, Switzerland. Before the draw, the 48 teams were divided into 24 seeded and 24 unseeded teams, based on their 2002 UEFA club coefficients. For convenience of the draw and to avoid pairing of teams from the same association, the teams were distributed into four groups of twelve teams, each containing an equal number of seeded and unseeded teams. In the draw, a seeded team from each group was paired with an unseeded team from the same group. The first team to be drawn played the first leg at home.

Group 1		Group 2		Group 3		Group 4	
Seeded	Unseeded	Seeded	Unseeded	Seeded	Unseeded	Seeded	Unseeded
(Italy) Lazio; (Greece) Panathinaikos; (Germany) VfB Stuttgart; (Portugal) Boavista; (England) Ipswich Town; (Spain) Málaga	(Czech Republic) Slovan Liberec; (Turkey) Fenerbahçe; (Federal Republic of Yugoslavia) Red Star Belgrade; (Poland) Amica Wronki; (Hungary) Ferencváros; (Cyprus) Anorthosis Famagusta	(Italy) Parma; (Spain) Alavés; (Germany) Hertha BSC; (Czech Republic) Slavia Prague; (Belgium) Anderlecht; (Croatia) Dinamo Zagreb	(England) Fulham; (Turkey) Beşiktaş; (Poland) Wisła Kraków; (Federal Republic of Yugoslavia) Partizan; (Denmark) Midtjylland; (Cyprus) APOEL	(England) Leeds United; (France) Bordeaux; (Spain) Real Betis; (Germany) Schalke 04; (Greece) PAOK; (Austria) Sturm Graz	(Switzerland) Grasshopper; (Israel) Hapoel Tel Aviv; (Poland) Legia Warsaw; (Czech Republic) Viktoria Žižkov; (Bulgaria) Levski Sofia; (Sweden) Djurgårdens IF	(Spain) Celta Vigo; (Portugal) Porto; (France) Paris Saint-Germain; (Czech Republic) Sparta Prague; (Germany) Werder Bremen; (Scotland) Celtic	(Netherlands) Vitesse; (England) Blackburn Rovers; (Norway) Viking; (Turkey) Denizlispor; Austria Wien; (Romania) Național București

== Summary ==
The first legs were played on 29 and 31 October, and the second legs were played on 7, 12 and 14 November 2002.

Team 1	Agg.	Team 2	1st leg	2nd leg
Viktoria Žižkov (Czech Republic)	0–4	(Spain) Real Betis	0–1	0–3
Legia Warsaw (Poland)	2–3	(Germany) Schalke 04	2–3	0–0
Djurgårdens IF (Sweden)	1–3	(France) Bordeaux	0–1	1–2
APOEL (Cyprus)	0–5	(Germany) Hertha BSC	0–1	0–4
Dinamo Zagreb (Croatia)	1–5	(England) Fulham	0–3	1–2
Sparta Prague (Czech Republic)	1–2	(Turkey) Denizlispor	1–0	0–2
Ferencváros (Hungary)	0–2	(Germany) VfB Stuttgart	0–0	0–2
Sturm Graz (Austria)	1–1 (8–7 p)	(Bulgaria) Levski Sofia	1–0	0–1 (a.e.t.)
Partizan (Federal Republic of Yugoslavia)	4–6	(Czech Republic) Slavia Prague	3–1	1–5 (a.e.t.)
Național București (Romania)	0–3	(France) Paris Saint-Germain	0–2	0–1
Fenerbahçe (Turkey)	2–5	(Greece) Panathinaikos	1–1	1–4
PAOK (Greece)	3–2	(Switzerland) Grasshopper	2–1	1–1
Lazio (Italy)	2–1	(Federal Republic of Yugoslavia) Red Star Belgrade	1–0	1–1
Anderlecht (Belgium)	6–1	(Denmark) Midtjylland	3–1	3–0
Austria Wien	0–3	(Portugal) Porto	0–1	0–2
Vitesse (Netherlands)	5–4	(Germany) Werder Bremen	2–1	3–3
Ipswich Town (England)	1–1 (2–4 p)	(Czech Republic) Slovan Liberec	1–0	0–1 (a.e.t.)
Alavés (Spain)	1–2	(Turkey) Beşiktaş	1–1	0–1
Parma (Italy)	3–5	(Poland) Wisła Kraków	2–1	1–4 (a.e.t.)
Leeds United (England)	5–1	(Israel) Hapoel Tel Aviv	1–0	4–1
Celtic (Scotland)	3–0	(England) Blackburn Rovers	1–0	2–0
Málaga (Spain)	4–2	(Poland) Amica Wronki	2–1	2–1
Celta Vigo (Spain)	4–1	(Norway) Viking	3–0	1–1
Boavista (Portugal)	3–1	(Cyprus) Anorthosis Famagusta	2–1	1–0

== Matches ==
29 October 2002
17:30

Viktoria Žižkov (Czech Republic)	0–1	(Spain) Real Betis
	Report	Denílson 44'

Stadion Evžena Rošického, Prague
Attendance: 4,461
Referee: Erol Ersoy (Turkey)
14 November 2002
21:30

Real Betis (Spain)	3–0	(Czech Republic) Viktoria Žižkov
Casas 45+1'; Joaquín 56' (pen.); Tomás 86'	Report

Estadio Manuel Ruíz de Lopera, Seville
Attendance: 6,000
Referee: Emil Bozinovski (Macedonia)

Real Betis won 4–0 on aggregate.

29 October 2002
18:00

Legia Warsaw (Poland)	2–3	(Germany) Schalke 04
Dudek 57'; Svitlica 61' (pen.)	Report	Varela 49', 53'; Sand 89'

Polish Army Stadium, Warsaw
Attendance: 9,800
Referee: Victor Esquinas Torres (Spain)
14 November 2002
17:30

Schalke 04 (Germany)	0–0	(Poland) Legia Warsaw
	Report

Arena AufSchalke, Gelsenkirchen
Attendance: 52,260
Referee: Andy D'Urso (England)

Schalke 04 won 3–2 on aggregate.

29 October 2002
18:00

Djurgårdens IF (Sweden)	0–1	(France) Bordeaux
	Report	Feindouno 63'

Råsundastadion, Solna
Attendance: 13,538
Referee: Anton Stredak (Slovakia)
12 November 2002
18:00

Bordeaux (France)	2–1	(Sweden) Djurgårdens IF
Feindouno 36', 50'	Report	Elmander 73'

Stade Chaban-Delmas, Bordeaux
Attendance: 10,677
Referee: Dani Koren (Israel)

Bordeaux won 3–1 on aggregate.

31 October 2002
15:00

APOEL (Cyprus)	0–1	(Germany) Hertha BSC
	Report	Karwan 90+2'

GSP Stadium, Nicosia
Attendance: 4,178
Referee: Dermot Gallagher (England)
7 November 2002
17:30

Hertha BSC (Germany)	4–0	(Cyprus) APOEL
Preetz 8'; Marcelinho 13'; Beinlich 61'; Luizão 66'	Report

Olympic Stadium, Berlin
Attendance: 10,083
Referee: Nicolai Vollquartz (Denmark)

Hertha BSC won 5–0 on aggregate.

31 October 2002
17:00

Dinamo Zagreb (Croatia)	0–3	(England) Fulham
	Report	Boa Morte 36'; Marlet 60'; Hayles 78'

Stadion Maksimir, Zagreb
Attendance: 22,100
Referee: Eduardo Iturralde González (Spain)
14 November 2002
20:45

Fulham (England)	2–1	(Croatia) Dinamo Zagreb
Malbranque 89'; Boa Morte 90'	Report	Olić 51'

Loftus Road, London
Attendance: 8,885
Referee: Laurent Duhamel (France)

Fulham won 5–1 on aggregate.

31 October 2002
17:15

Sparta Prague (Czech Republic)	1–0	(Turkey) Denizlispor
Jarošík 20'	Report

Stadion Letná, Prague
Attendance: 5,778
Referee: Peter Fröjdfeldt (Sweden)
14 November 2002
17:00

Denizlispor (Turkey)	2–0	(Czech Republic) Sparta Prague
Özkan 24', 54' (pen.)	Report

Atatürk Stadium, Denizli
Attendance: 10,350
Referee: Michael Weiner (Germany)

Denizlispor won 2–1 on aggregate.

31 October 2002
18:00

Ferencváros (Hungary)	0–0	(Germany) VfB Stuttgart
	Report

Stadion Albert Flórián, Budapest
Attendance: 12,760
Referee: Mikko Vuorela (Finland)
12 November 2002
18:00

VfB Stuttgart (Germany)	2–0	(Hungary) Ferencváros
Amanatidis 63'; Meira 90' (pen.)	Report

Gottlieb-Daimler-Stadion, Stuttgart
Attendance: 15,526
Referee: Costas Kapitanis (Cyprus)

VfB Stuttgart won 2–0 on aggregate.

31 October 2002
18:00

Sturm Graz (Austria)	1–0	(Bulgaria) Levski Sofia
Szabics 21'	Report

Stadion Graz-Liebenau, Graz
Attendance: 5,422
Referee: Karel Vidlak (Czech Republic)
14 November 2002
18:00

Levski Sofia (Bulgaria)	1–0 (a.e.t.)	(Austria) Sturm Graz
Simonović 6'	Report
Penalties
Markov (penalty scored); Telkiyski (penalty scored); Kolev (penalty scored); Topuzakov (penalty scored); Stoilov (penalty missed); Angelov (penalty scored); Pantelić (penalty scored); Lawal (penalty scored); Bachkov (penalty missed)	7–8	(penalty scored) Szabics; (penalty scored) Brzęczek; (penalty scored) Wetl; (penalty scored) Angan; (penalty missed) Golemac; (penalty scored) Korsós; (penalty scored) Strafner; (penalty scored) Neukirchner; (penalty scored) Amoah

Vasil Levski National Stadium, Sofia
Attendance: 22,582
Referee: Darko Čeferin (Slovenia)

1–1 on aggregate; Sturm Graz won 8–7 on penalties.

31 October 2002
18:30

Partizan (Federal Republic of Yugoslavia)	3–1	(Czech Republic) Slavia Prague
Lazović 4'; Ilić 32'; Vukić 69'	Report	Dostálek 56'

Partizan Stadium, Belgrade
Attendance: 9,960
Referee: Paulo Costa (Portugal)
14 November 2002
20:00

Slavia Prague (Czech Republic)	5–1 (a.e.t.)	(Federal Republic of Yugoslavia) Partizan
Vachoušek 10', 40'; Petrouš 87' (pen.); Gedeon 93'; Adauto 110'	Report	Ivić 89'

Stadion Evžena Rošického, Prague
Attendance: 8,563
Referee: Georgios Douros (Greece)

Slavia Prague won 6–4 on aggregate.

31 October 2002
19:00

Național București (Romania)	0–2	(France) Paris Saint-Germain
	Report	L. Leroy 5'; André Luiz 69'

Stadionul Cotroceni, Bucharest
Attendance: 4,000
Referee: Steve Bennett (England)
14 November 2002
20:30

Paris Saint-Germain (France)	1–0	(Romania) Național București
L. Leroy 56'	Report

Parc des Princes, Paris
Attendance: 17,459
Referee: Tomasz Mikulski (Poland)

Paris Saint-Germain won 3–0 on aggregate.

31 October 2002
19:15

Fenerbahçe (Turkey)	1–1	(Greece) Panathinaikos
Washington 42'	Report	Basinas 14'

Şükrü Saracoğlu Stadium, Istanbul
Attendance: 31,500
Referee: Pasquale Rodomonti (Italy)
14 November 2002
20:00

Panathinaikos (Greece)	4–1	(Turkey) Fenerbahçe
Liberopoulos 24'; Goumas 31'; Michaelsen 42'; Warzycha 89'	Report	Tuncay 37'

Leoforos Alexandras Stadium, Athens
Attendance: 7,038
Referee: Fernando Carmona Méndez (Spain)

Panathinaikos won 5–2 on aggregate.

31 October 2002
20:00

PAOK (Greece)	2–1	(Switzerland) Grasshopper
Chasiotis 3'; Yiasoumi 48'	Report	Núñez 64' (pen.)

Toumba Stadium, Thessaloniki
Attendance: 9,577
Referee: Luc Huyghe (Belgium)
14 November 2002
20:15

Grasshopper (Switzerland)	1–1	(Greece) PAOK
Cabanas 45'	Report	Markos 90'

Hardturm, Zürich
Attendance: 6,600
Referee: Martin Hansson (Sweden)

PAOK won 3–2 on aggregate.

31 October 2002
20:30

Lazio (Italy)	1–0	(Federal Republic of Yugoslavia) Red Star Belgrade
Fiore 10'	Report

Stadio Olimpico, Rome
Attendance: 16,511
Referee: Metin Tokat (Turkey)
14 November 2002
19:00

Red Star Belgrade (Federal Republic of Yugoslavia)	1–1	(Italy) Lazio
Bošković 69'	Report	Chiesa 77'

Red Star Stadium, Belgrade
Attendance: 52,000
Referee: Julián Rodríguez Santiago (Spain)

Lazio won 2–1 on aggregate.

31 October 2002
20:30

Anderlecht (Belgium)	3–1	(Denmark) Midtjylland
Jestrović 55', 61' (pen.); Dindane 71'	Report	Kristensen 80'

Constant Vanden Stock Stadium, Brussels
Attendance: 13,976
Referee: António Costa (Portugal)
14 November 2002
20:05

Midtjylland (Denmark)	0–3	(Belgium) Anderlecht
	Report	Seol 18'; Jestrović 83'; Dindane 89'

Silkeborg Stadion, Silkeborg
Attendance: 4,464
Referee: Fiorenzo Treossi (Italy)

Anderlecht won 6–1 on aggregate.

31 October 2002
20:30

Austria Wien	0–1	(Portugal) Porto
	Report	Derlei 70'

Ernst-Happel-Stadion, Vienna
Attendance: 29,200
Referee: Kristinn Jakobsson (Iceland)
14 November 2002
22:30

Porto (Portugal)	2–0	Austria Wien
Postiga 29'; Derlei 86'	Report

Estádio das Antas, Porto
Attendance: 22,245
Referee: Grzegorz Gilewski (Poland)

Porto won 3–0 on aggregate.

31 October 2002
20:30

Vitesse (Netherlands)	2–1	(Germany) Werder Bremen
Amoah 36'; Verlaat 61' (o.g.)	Report	Verlaat 42'

GelreDome, Arnhem
Attendance: 18,611
Referee: Mike McCurry (Scotland)
14 November 2002
20:30

Werder Bremen (Germany)	3–3	(Netherlands) Vitesse
Baumann 24'; Krstajić 49'; Charisteas 79'	Report	Levchenko 50' (pen.); Claessens 73'; M'Bamba 90+4'

Weserstadion, Bremen
Attendance: 19,148
Referee: Leslie Irvine (Northern Ireland)

Vitesse won 5–4 on aggregate.

31 October 2002
20:45

Ipswich Town (England)	1–0	(Czech Republic) Slovan Liberec
D. Bent 68'	Report

Portman Road, Ipswich
Attendance: 16,138
Referee: Philippe Leuba (Switzerland)
14 November 2002
19:00

Slovan Liberec (Czech Republic)	1–0 (a.e.t.)	(England) Ipswich Town
Gyan 88'	Report
Penalties
Slovák (penalty scored); Holeňák (penalty scored); Zboncak (penalty scored); Papoušek (penalty scored)	4–2	(penalty scored) Holland; (penalty missed) Wright; (penalty scored) Bent; (penalty missed) Finidi

Stadion u Nisy, Liberec
Attendance: 6,509
Referee: Edo Trivković (Croatia)

1–1 on aggregate; Slovan Liberec won 4–2 on penalties.

31 October 2002
20:45

Alavés (Spain)	1–1	(Turkey) Beşiktaş
Abelardo 90+3'	Report	Karmona 31' (o.g.)

Mendizorrotza Stadium, Vitoria-Gasteiz
Attendance: 10,375
Referee: Michal Beneš (Czech Republic)
14 November 2002
18:30

Beşiktaş (Turkey)	1–0	(Spain) Alavés
Mansiz 7'	Report

BJK İnönü Stadium, Istanbul
Attendance: 24,000
Referee: Pascal Garubian (France)

Beşiktaş won 2–1 on aggregate.

31 October 2002
21:00

Parma (Italy)	2–1	(Poland) Wisła Kraków
Donati 26'; Mutu 74'	Report	Żurawski 46'

Stadio Ennio Tardini, Parma
Attendance: 6,936
Referee: Alon Yefet (Israel)
14 November 2002
20:45

Wisła Kraków (Poland)	4–1 (a.e.t.)	(Italy) Parma
Kosowski 70'; Żurawski 80', 94'; Dubicki 107'	Report	Adriano 6'

Stadion Miejski, Kraków
Attendance: 6,750
Referee: Dejan Delević (FR Yugoslavia)

Wisła Kraków won 5–3 on aggregate.

31 October 2002
21:00

Leeds United (England)	1–0	(Israel) Hapoel Tel Aviv
Kewell 81'	Report

Elland Road, Leeds
Attendance: 31,867
Referee: Jack van Hulten (Netherlands)
14 November 2002
17:00

Hapoel Tel Aviv (Israel)	1–4	(England) Leeds United
Abukasis 2'	Report	Smith 30', 54', 63', 83'

Stadio Artemio Franchi, Florence, Italy (Note: Due to security issues caused by the Second Intifada, Israeli teams were required to play their home matches at neutral venues until further notice.)
Attendance: 2,300
Referee: Fritz Stuchlik (Austria)

Leeds United won 5–1 on aggregate.

31 October 2002
21:05

Celtic (Scotland)	1–0	(England) Blackburn Rovers
Larsson 85'	Report

Celtic Park, Glasgow
Attendance: 58,553
Referee: Hermann Albrecht (Germany)
14 November 2002
20:45

Blackburn Rovers (England)	0–2	(Scotland) Celtic
	Report	Larsson 15'; Sutton 67'

Ewood Park, Blackburn
Attendance: 29,698
Referee: Cosimo Bolognino (Italy)

Celtic won 3–0 on aggregate.

31 October 2002
21:30

Málaga (Spain)	2–1	(Poland) Amica Wronki
Romero 39'; Dely Valdés 69'	Report	Jikia 2'

La Rosaleda Stadium, Málaga
Attendance: 6,339
Referee: Alexandru Tudor (Romania)
12 November 2002
18:00

Amica Wronki (Poland)	1–2	(Spain) Málaga
Gesior 16'	Report	Silva 20'; Musampa 72'

Stadion Amica, Wronki
Attendance: 1,100
Referee: Bernhard Brugger (Austria)

Málaga won 4–2 on aggregate.

31 October 2002
21:30

Celta Vigo (Spain)	3–0	(Norway) Viking
José Ignacio 35'; Edu 37'; McCarthy 75'	Report

Balaídos, Vigo
Attendance: 10,268
Referee: Stefano Farina (Italy)
14 November 2002
19:00

Viking (Norway)	1–1	(Spain) Celta Vigo
Sigurðsson 85'	Report	Mostovoi 76'

Stavanger Stadion, Stavanger
Attendance: 5,410
Referee: Vitaliy Godulyan (Ukraine)

Celta Vigo won 4–1 on aggregate.

31 October 2002
22:00

Boavista (Portugal)	2–1	(Cyprus) Anorthosis Famagusta
Silva 31'; Éder Gaúcho 50'	Report	Michalski 84'

Estádio do Bessa, Porto
Attendance: 4,287
Referee: Attila Hanacsek (Hungary)
14 November 2002
19:30

Anorthosis Famagusta (Cyprus)	0–1	(Portugal) Boavista
	Report	Silva 90+5' (pen.)

GSP Stadium, Nicosia
Attendance: 5,500
Referee: Yuri Baskakov (Russia)

Boavista won 3–1 on aggregate.
