= 2002–03 UEFA Cup final phase =

Tournament knockout phase

The final phase of the 2002–03 UEFA Cup began on 26 November 2002 with the first matches of the third round and concluded on 21 May 2003 with the final at the Estadio Olímpico in Seville, Spain. A total of 32 teams competed in this phase of the competition.

Times up to 30 March 2003 (quarter-finals) were CET (UTC+1), and thereafter (semi-finals and final) CEST (UTC+2).

== Round and draw dates ==
The draw for the third round was held in Geneva, while the remaining draws were held at UEFA headquarters in Nyon, Switzerland.

Round	Draw date	First leg	Second leg
Third round	15 November 2002	28 November 2002	12 December 2002
Fourth round	13 December 2002	20 February 2003	27 February 2003
Quarter-finals	13 December 2002	13 March 2003	20 March 2003
Semi-finals	21 March 2003	10 April 2003	24 April 2003
Final	21 March 2003	21 May 2003 at Estadio Olímpico, Seville	

== Format ==
Apart from the final, each tie was played over two legs, with each team playing one leg at home. The team that scored more goals on aggregate over the two legs advanced to the next round. If the aggregate score was level, the away goals rule was applied, i.e., the team that scored more goals away from home over the two legs advanced. If away goals were also equal, then thirty minutes of extra time (two fifteen-minute periods) was played. For the first time in an international football tournament, the silver goal system was applied, whereby the team who leads the game at the half-time break during the extra time period would be declared the winner. If the scores were still level after the initial 15 minutes of extra time play would continue for a further 15 minutes. The away goals rule was again applied after extra time, i.e., if there were goals scored during extra time and the aggregate score was still level, the visiting team advanced by virtue of more away goals scored. If no goals were scored during extra time, the tie was decided by penalty shoot-out.

In the final, which was played as a single match, if scores were level at the end of normal time, extra time was played. If, on completion of the first period of extra time, one of the teams had scored more goals than the other, the silver goal rule was applied, i.e., the match ended and that team was declared the winner. If no decisive goal was scored, the second period of the extra time was played, followed by a penalty shoot-out if scores remained tied.

The mechanism of the draws for each round was as follows:

- In the draws the third and fourth rounds, teams were seeded and divided into groups containing an equal number of seeded and unseeded teams. In each group, the seeded teams were drawn against the unseeded teams, with the first team drawn hosting the first leg. Teams from the same association could not be drawn against each other.
- In the draws for the quarter-finals onwards, there were no seedings and teams from the same association could be drawn against each other.

== Qualified teams ==
The final phase involved 32 teams: the 24 teams which qualified from the second round, and the eight third-placed teams from the Champions League first group stage.

Qualified teams

Team	Notes	Coeff.
(Italy) Lazio		106.334
(England) Liverpool		79.729
(England) Leeds United		76.729
(Spain) Celta Vigo		76.233
(France) Lyon		74.176
(Portugal) Porto		66.124
(France) Bordeaux		63.176
(Ukraine) Dynamo Kyiv		59.979

Team	Notes	Coeff.
(Greece) Panathinaikos		57.058
(Germany) VfB Stuttgart		53.495
(Germany) Hertha BSC		52.495
(Greece) AEK Athens		52.058
(France) Paris Saint-Germain		51.176
(Spain) Real Betis		49.233
(Czech Republic) Slavia Prague		47.312
(Germany) Schalke 04		46.495

Team	Notes	Coeff.
(France) Lens		44.176
(Belgium) Club Brugge		41.762
(Greece) PAOK		41.058
(Belgium) Anderlecht		38.762
(Austria) Sturm Graz		37.625
(Portugal) Boavista		36.124
(Scotland) Celtic		36.062
(Spain) Málaga		34.233

Team	Notes	Coeff.
(France) Auxerre		32.176
(Netherlands) Vitesse		30.082
(Czech Republic) Slovan Liberec		29.312
(England) Fulham		27.729
(Turkey) Beşiktaş		26.362
(Poland) Wisła Kraków		21.750
(Israel) Maccabi Haifa		18.666
(Turkey) Denizlispor		14.362

Notes

1. ^{R2} Winners from the second round
2. ^{CL} Third-placed teams from the Champions League first group stage

== Bracket ==
Third round
(Scotland) Celtic (a)	1	1	2
(Spain) Celta Vigo	0	2	2
(Belgium) Club Brugge	1	0	1
(Germany) VfB Stuttgart	2	1	3
(Spain) Real Betis	1	0	1
(France) Auxerre	0	2	2
(Netherlands) Vitesse	0	0	0
(England) Liverpool	1	1	2
(Spain) Málaga	0	2	2
(England) Leeds United	0	1	1
(Greece) AEK Athens	4	4	8
(Israel) Maccabi Haifa	0	1	1
(Germany) Hertha BSC	2	0	2
(England) Fulham	1	0	1
(France) Paris Saint-Germain	2	0	2
(Portugal) Boavista (a)	1	1	2
(Portugal) Porto	3	0	3
(France) Lens	0	1	1
(Turkey) Denizlispor	0	1	1
(France) Lyon	0	0	0
(Czech Republic) Slovan Liberec	2	0	2
(Greece) Panathinaikos	2	1	3
(France) Bordeaux	0	2	2
(Belgium) Anderlecht	2	2	4
(Austria) Sturm Graz	1	1	2
(Italy) Lazio	3	0	3
(Poland) Wisła Kraków	1	4	5
(Germany) Schalke 04	1	1	2
(Greece) PAOK	1	0	1
(Czech Republic) Slavia Prague	0	4	4
(Turkey) Beşiktaş	3	0	3
(Ukraine) Dynamo Kyiv	1	0	1

Fourth round
(Scotland) Celtic	3	2	5
(Germany) VfB Stuttgart	1	3	4
(France) Auxerre	0	0	0
(England) Liverpool	1	2	3
(Spain) Málaga	0	1	1
(Greece) AEK Athens	0	0	0
(Germany) Hertha BSC	3	0	3
(Portugal) Boavista (a)	2	1	3
(Portugal) Porto	6	2	8
(Turkey) Denizlispor	1	2	3
(Greece) Panathinaikos	3	0	3
(Belgium) Anderlecht	0	2	2
(Italy) Lazio	3	2	5
(Poland) Wisła Kraków	3	1	4
(Czech Republic) Slavia Prague	1	2	3
(Turkey) Beşiktaş	0	4	4

Quarter-finals
(Scotland) Celtic	1	2	3
(England) Liverpool	1	0	1
(Spain) Málaga	1	0	1 (1)
(Portugal) Boavista (p)	0	1	1 (4)
(Portugal) Porto (a.e.t.)	0	2	2
(Greece) Panathinaikos	1	0	1
(Italy) Lazio	1	2	3
(Turkey) Beşiktaş	0	1	1

Semi-finals
(Scotland) Celtic	1	1	2
(Portugal) Boavista	1	0	1
(Portugal) Porto	4	0	4
(Italy) Lazio	1	0	1

Final
21 May – Seville
(Scotland) Celtic	2
(Portugal) Porto (a.e.t.)	3

== Third round ==
=== Seeding ===
The 32 teams were distributed into two groups of eight teams, each containing four seeded and four unseeded teams. The draw was held on 15 November 2002 in Geneva, Switzerland.

Group 1		Group 2		Group 3		Group 4	
Seeded	Unseeded	Seeded	Unseeded	Seeded	Unseeded	Seeded	Unseeded
(Italy) Lazio; (Ukraine) Dynamo Kyiv; (Spain) Real Betis; (Germany) Schalke 04	(Austria) Sturm Graz; (France) Auxerre; (Turkey) Beşiktaş; (Poland) Wisła Kraków	(England) Liverpool; (Greece) Panathinaikos; (Germany) VfB Stuttgart; (France) Paris Saint-Germain	(Belgium) Club Brugge; (Portugal) Boavista; (Netherlands) Vitesse; (Czech Republic) Slovan Liberec	(England) Leeds United; (France) Lyon; (France) Bordeaux; (Czech Republic) Slavia Prague	(Greece) PAOK; (Belgium) Anderlecht; (Spain) Málaga; (Turkey) Denizlispor	(Spain) Celta Vigo; (Portugal) Porto; (Germany) Hertha BSC; (Greece) AEK Athens	(France) Lens; (Scotland) Celtic; (England) Fulham; (Israel) Maccabi Haifa

=== Summary ===
The first legs were played on 26 and 28 November, and the second legs were played on 10 and 12 December 2002.

Team 1	Agg.	Team 2	1st leg	2nd leg
Hertha BSC (Germany)	2–1	(England) Fulham	2–1	0–0
Paris Saint-Germain (France)	2–2 (a)	(Portugal) Boavista	2–1	0–1
Wisła Kraków (Poland)	5–2	(Germany) Schalke 04	1–1	4–1
Denizlispor (Turkey)	1–0	(France) Lyon	0–0	1–0
Slovan Liberec (Czech Republic)	2–3	(Greece) Panathinaikos	2–2	0–1
Beşiktaş (Turkey)	3–1	(Ukraine) Dynamo Kyiv	3–1	0–0
Bordeaux (France)	2–4	(Belgium) Anderlecht	0–2	2–2
PAOK (Greece)	1–4	(Czech Republic) Slavia Prague	1–0	0–4
AEK Athens (Greece)	8–1	(Israel) Maccabi Haifa	4–0	4–1
Sturm Graz (Austria)	2–3	(Italy) Lazio	1–3	1–0
Club Brugge (Belgium)	1–3	(Germany) VfB Stuttgart	1–2	0–1
Vitesse (Netherlands)	0–2	(England) Liverpool	0–1	0–1
Celtic (Scotland)	2–2 (a)	(Spain) Celta Vigo	1–0	1–2
Real Betis (Spain)	1–2	(France) Auxerre	1–0	0–2
Málaga (Spain)	2–1	(England) Leeds United	0–0	2–1
Porto (Portugal)	3–1	(France) Lens	3–0	0–1

=== Matches ===
26 November 2002
17:30

Hertha BSC (Germany)	2–1	(England) Fulham
Beinlich 28'; Sava 68' (o.g.)	Report	Marlet 53'

Olympic Stadium, Berlin
Attendance: 14,477
Referee: Dick van Egmond (Netherlands)
12 December 2002
18:00

Fulham (England)	0–0	(Germany) Hertha BSC
	Report

Loftus Road, London
Attendance: 15,161
Referee: Pierluigi Collina (Italy)

Hertha BSC won 2–1 on aggregate.

26 November 2002
18:00

Paris Saint-Germain (France)	2–1	(Portugal) Boavista
Nyarko 16'; Fiorese 45'	Report	Luiz Cláudio 75'

Parc des Princes, Paris
Attendance: 20,012
Referee: Massimo De Santis (Italy)
12 December 2002
22:30

Boavista (Portugal)	1–0	(France) Paris Saint-Germain
Silva 56' (pen.)	Report

Estádio do Bessa, Porto
Attendance: 5,592
Referee: Željko Širić (Croatia)

2–2 on aggregate; Boavista won on away goals.

28 November 2002
17:30

Wisła Kraków (Poland)	1–1	(Germany) Schalke 04
Poulsen 38' (o.g.)	Report	Mpenza 81'

Stadion Miejski, Kraków
Attendance: 10,300
Referee: Georgios Kasnaferis (Greece)
10 December 2002
17:30

Schalke 04 (Germany)	1–4	(Poland) Wisła Kraków
Hajto 42'	Report	Żurawski 40', 85'; Uche 51'; Kosowski 89'

Arena AufSchalke, Gelsenkirchen
Attendance: 50,830
Referee: Tom Henning Øvrebø (Norway)

Wisła Kraków won 5–2 on aggregate.

28 November 2002
18:00

Denizlispor (Turkey)	0–0	(France) Lyon
	Report

Atatürk Stadium, Denizli
Attendance: 10,488
Referee: Rune Pedersen (Norway)
12 December 2002
18:00

Lyon (France)	0–1	(Turkey) Denizlispor
	Report	Özkan 6'

Stade de Gerland, Lyon
Attendance: 34,564
Referee: Leslie Irvine (Northern Ireland)

Denizlispor won 1–0 on aggregate.

28 November 2002
18:30

Slovan Liberec (Czech Republic)	2–2	(Greece) Panathinaikos
Zbončák 44'; Slovák 84' (pen.)	Report	Basinas 13' (pen.); Olisadebe 52'

Stadion u Nisy, Liberec
Attendance: 5,805
Referee: Mike RIley (England)
12 December 2002
17:45

Panathinaikos (Greece)	1–0	(Czech Republic) Slovan Liberec
Fyssas 2'	Report

Leoforos Alexandras Stadium, Athens
Attendance: 11,029
Referee: Éric Poulat (France)

Panathinaikos won 3–2 on aggregate.

28 November 2002
20:00

Beşiktaş (Turkey)	3–1	(Ukraine) Dynamo Kyiv
Pancu 30'; Yıldırım 71'; Nouma 82'	Report	Husin 29'

BJK İnönü Stadium, Istanbul
Attendance: 28,000
Referee: Alain Hamer (Luxembourg)
12 December 2002
19:00

Dynamo Kyiv (Ukraine)	0–0	(Turkey) Beşiktaş
	Report

Olimpiyskiy NSC, Kyiv
Attendance: 18,000
Referee: Cosimo Bolognino (Italy)

Beşiktaş won 3–1 on aggregate.

28 November 2002
20:00

Bordeaux (France)	0–2	(Belgium) Anderlecht
	Report	Jestrović 9'; Hasi 90+1'

Stade Chaban-Delmas, Bordeaux
Attendance: 12,150
Referee: Konrad Plautz (Austria)
12 December 2002
20:30

Anderlecht (Belgium)	2–2	(France) Bordeaux
Dindane 28'; Jestrović 68'	Report	Darcheville 82', 90+1'

Constant Vanden Stock Stadium, Brussels
Attendance: 17,721
Referee: Michal Beneš (Czech Republic)

Anderlecht won 4–2 on aggregate.

28 November 2002
20:00

PAOK (Greece)	1–0	(Czech Republic) Slavia Prague
Georgiadis 51'	Report

Toumba Stadium, Thessaloniki
Attendance: 16,113
Referee: Alain Sars (France)
12 December 2002
20:30

Slavia Prague (Czech Republic)	4–0	(Greece) PAOK
Skácel 13'; Vachoušek 51'; Kuka 89', 90+3'	Report

Stadion Evžena Rošického, Prague
Attendance: 8,563
Referee: Antonio López Nieto (Spain)

Slavia Prague won 4–1 on aggregate.

28 November 2002
20:15

AEK Athens (Greece)	4–0	(Israel) Maccabi Haifa
Georgatos 13'; Nikolaidis 23'; Petkov 30'; Zagorakis 35'	Report

Nikos Goumas Stadium, Nea Filadelfeia
Attendance: 8,695
Referee: Paulo Costa (Portugal)
12 December 2002
20:30

Maccabi Haifa (Israel)	1–4	(Greece) AEK Athens
Badir 5' (pen.)	Report	Katsouranis 56'; Lakis 80', 90'; Nalitzis 90+3'

GSP Stadium, Nicosia, Cyprus (Note: Due to security issues caused by the Second Intifada, Israeli teams were required to play their home matches at neutral venues until further notice.)
Attendance: 1,615
Referee: Knud Erik Fisker (Denmark)

AEK Athens won 8–1 on aggregate.

28 November 2002
20:30

Sturm Graz (Austria)	1–3	(Italy) Lazio
Amoah 44'	Report	Chiesa 46'; Inzaghi 56', 87'

Stadion Graz-Liebenau, Graz
Attendance: 15,375
Referee: Jacek Granat (Poland)
12 December 2002
20:30

Lazio (Italy)	0–1	(Austria) Sturm Graz
	Report	Szabics 87'

Stadio Olimpico, Rome
Attendance: 3,958
Referee: Paul Allaerts (Belgium)

Lazio won 3–2 on aggregate.

28 November 2002
20:30

Club Brugge (Belgium)	1–2	(Germany) VfB Stuttgart
Van Der Heyden 42'	Report	Balakov 72'; Kurányi 89'

Jan Breydel Stadium, Bruges
Attendance: 18,483
Referee: Domenico Messina (Italy)
12 December 2002
20:30

VfB Stuttgart (Germany)	1–0	(Belgium) Club Brugge
Hleb 90+3'	Report

Gottlieb-Daimler-Stadion, Stuttgart
Attendance: 34,000
Referee: Arturo Daudén Ibáñez (Spain)

VfB Stuttgart won 3–1 on aggregate.

28 November 2002
20:45

Vitesse (Netherlands)	0–1	(England) Liverpool
	Report	Owen 26'

GelreDome, Arnhem
Attendance: 27,300
Referee: Manuel Mejuto González (Spain)
12 December 2002
20:45

Liverpool (England)	1–0	(Netherlands) Vitesse
Owen 21'	Report

Anfield, Liverpool
Attendance: 23,576
Referee: Wolfgang Stark (Germany)

Liverpool won 2–0 on aggregate.

28 November 2002
21:05

Celtic (Scotland)	1–0	(Spain) Celta Vigo
Larsson 52'	Report

Celtic Park, Glasgow
Attendance: 53,726
Referee: Claude Colombo (France)
12 December 2002
21:05

Celta Vigo (Spain)	2–1	(Scotland) Celtic
Jesuli 23'; McCarthy 54'	Report	Hartson 37'

Balaídos, Vigo
Attendance: 16,955
Referee: Claus Bo Larsen (Denmark)

2–2 on aggregate; Celtic won on away goals.

28 November 2002
21:30

Real Betis (Spain)	1–0	(France) Auxerre
Alfonso 10' (pen.)	Report

Estadio Manuel Ruíz de Lopera, Seville
Attendance: 15,660
Referee: Helmut Fleischer (Germany)
12 December 2002
19:30

Auxerre (France)	2–0	(Spain) Real Betis
Tainio 19'; Lachuer 48'	Report

Stade de l'Abbé-Deschamps, Auxerre
Attendance: 9,619
Referee: Stuart Dougal (Scotland)

Auxerre won 2–1 on aggregate.

28 November 2002
22:00

Málaga (Spain)	0–0	(England) Leeds United
	Report

La Rosaleda Stadium, Málaga
Attendance: 13,491
Referee: Alfredo Trentalange (Italy)
12 December 2002
21:00

Leeds United (England)	1–2	(Spain) Málaga
Bakke 22'	Report	Dely Valdés 13', 79'

Elland Road, Leeds
Attendance: 34,123
Referee: Massimo Busacca (Switzerland)

Málaga won 2–1 on aggregate.

28 November 2002
22:30

Porto (Portugal)	3–0	(France) Lens
Postiga 36'; Derlei 45'; Jankauskas 87'	Report

Estádio das Antas, Porto
Attendance: 32,041
Referee: Graham Poll (England)
12 December 2002
21:15

Lens (France)	1–0	(Portugal) Porto
Song 28'	Report

Stade Félix-Bollaert, Lens
Attendance: 35,026
Referee: Vladimír Hriňák (Slovakia)

Porto won 3–1 on aggregate.

== Fourth round ==
=== Seeding ===
The 16 teams were distributed into two groups of eight teams, each containing four seeded and four unseeded teams. The draw was held on 13 December 2002 in Nyon, Switzerland.

Group 1		Group 2	
Seeded	Unseeded	Seeded	Unseeded
(Italy) Lazio; (Germany) Hertha BSC; (Greece) AEK Athens; (Czech Republic) Slavia Prague	(Portugal) Boavista; (Spain) Málaga; (Turkey) Beşiktaş; (Poland) Wisła Kraków	(England) Liverpool; (Portugal) Porto; (Greece) Panathinaikos; (Germany) VfB Stuttgart	(Belgium) Anderlecht; (Scotland) Celtic; (France) Auxerre; (Turkey) Denizlispor

=== Summary ===
The first legs were played on 20 February, and the second legs were played on 27 February 2003.

Team 1	Agg.	Team 2	1st leg	2nd leg
Hertha BSC (Germany)	3–3 (a)	(Portugal) Boavista	3–2	0–1
Panathinaikos (Greece)	3–2	(Belgium) Anderlecht	3–0	0–2
Slavia Prague (Czech Republic)	3–4	(Turkey) Beşiktaş	1–0	2–4
Auxerre (France)	0–3	(England) Liverpool	0–1	0–2
Lazio (Italy)	5–4	(Poland) Wisła Kraków	3–3	2–1
Málaga (Spain)	1–0	(Greece) AEK Athens	0–0	1–0
Celtic (Scotland)	5–4	(Germany) VfB Stuttgart	3–1	2–3
Porto (Portugal)	8–3	(Turkey) Denizlispor	6–1	2–2

=== Matches ===
20 February 2003
18:15

Hertha BSC (Germany)	3–2	(Portugal) Boavista
Alves 15', 43'; Van Burik 90+2'	Report	Rui Óscar 37'; Alexandre 81'

Olympic Stadium, Berlin
Attendance: 15,559
Referee: Graham Barber (England)
27 February 2003
21:30

Boavista (Portugal)	1–0	(Germany) Hertha BSC
Ávalos 84'	Report

Estádio do Bessa, Porto
Attendance: 5,071
Referee: Alain Hamer (Luxembourg)

3–3 on aggregate; Boavista won on away goals.

20 February 2003
19:30

Panathinaikos (Greece)	3–0	(Belgium) Anderlecht
Olisadebe 12', 73'; Liberopoulos 63'	Report

Leoforos Alexandras Stadium, Athens
Attendance: 14,048
Referee: Manuel Mejuto González (Spain)
27 February 2003
20:30

Anderlecht (Belgium)	2–0	(Greece) Panathinaikos
Jestrović 70', 81'	Report

Constant Vanden Stock Stadium, Brussels
Attendance: 17,970
Referee: Herbert Fandel (Germany)

Panathinaikos won 3–2 on aggregate.

20 February 2003
20:00

Slavia Prague (Czech Republic)	1–0	(Turkey) Beşiktaş
Došek 62'	Report

Stadion Evžena Rošického, Prague
Attendance: 12,357
Referee: Arturo Daudén Ibáñez (Spain)
27 February 2003
18:30

Beşiktaş (Turkey)	4–2	(Czech Republic) Slavia Prague
Pancu 41'; Ronaldo 61'; Dursun 66'; Mansiz 70'	Report	Dostálek 77' (pen.); Hrdlička 83'

BJK İnönü Stadium, Istanbul
Attendance: 24,170
Referee: Domenico Messina (Italy)

Beşiktaş won 4–3 on aggregate.

20 February 2003
20:45

Auxerre (France)	0–1	(England) Liverpool
	Report	Hyypiä 72'

Stade de l'Abbé-Deschamps, Auxerre
Attendance: 20,452
Referee: Massimo De Santis (Italy)
27 February 2003
21:05

Liverpool (England)	2–0	(France) Auxerre
Owen 66'; Murphy 72'	Report

Anfield, Liverpool
Attendance: 34,252
Referee: Antonio López Nieto (Spain)

Liverpool won 3–0 on aggregate.

20 February 2003
21:00

Lazio (Italy)	3–3	(Poland) Wisła Kraków
Lazetić 22'; Jop 44' (o.g.); Chiesa 71'	Report	Uche 39'; Żurawski 50' (pen.), 63' (pen.)

Stadio Olimpico, Rome
Attendance: 16,004
Referee: Konrad Plautz (Austria)
5 March 2003
18:00

Wisła Kraków (Poland)	1–2	(Italy) Lazio
Kuźba 5'	Report	Couto 20'; Chiesa 53'

Stadion Miejski, Kraków
Attendance: 9,100
Referee: Stuart Dougal (Scotland)

Lazio won 5–4 on aggregate.

20 February 2003
21:30

Málaga (Spain)	0–0	(Greece) AEK Athens
	Report

La Rosaleda Stadium, Málaga
Attendance: 9,720
Referee: Željko Širić (Croatia)
27 February 2003
19:00

AEK Athens (Greece)	0–1	(Spain) Málaga
	Report	Sánchez 26'

Nikos Goumas Stadium, Nea Filadelfeia
Attendance: 16,050
Referee: Rob Styles (England)

Málaga won 1–0 on aggregate.

20 February 2003
21:30

Celtic (Scotland)	3–1	(Germany) VfB Stuttgart
Lambert 36'; Maloney 44'; Petrov 68'	Report	Kurányi 27'

Celtic Park, Glasgow
Attendance: 57,450
Referee: Pierluigi Collina (Italy)
27 February 2003
19:30

VfB Stuttgart (Germany)	3–2	(Scotland) Celtic
Tifert 39'; Hleb 76'; Mutzel 88'	Report	Thompson 9'; Sutton 11'

Gottlieb-Daimler-Stadion, Stuttgart
Attendance: 50,348
Referee: Jan Wegereef (Netherlands)

Celtic won 5–4 on aggregate.

20 February 2003
22:00

Porto (Portugal)	6–1	(Turkey) Denizlispor
Capucho 48'; Derlei 53'; R. Costa 65'; Jankauskas 70'; Deco 73'; Alenichev 82'	Report	Kratochvíl 78'

Estádio das Antas, Porto
Attendance: 21,941
Referee: Massimo Busacca (Switzerland)
27 February 2003
20:00

Denizlispor (Turkey)	2–2	(Portugal) Porto
Martin 52'; Özkan 58'	Report	Derlei 42'; Clayton 84'

Atatürk Stadium, Denizli
Attendance: 4,300
Referee: Claude Colombo (France)

Porto won 8–3 on aggregate.

== Quarter-finals ==
=== Summary ===
The quarter-final draw was held on 13 December 2002, immediately after the fourth round draw. The first legs were played on 13 March, and the second legs were played on 20 March 2003.

Team 1	Agg.	Team 2	1st leg	2nd leg
Porto (Portugal)	2–1	(Greece) Panathinaikos	0–1	2–0 (a.e.t.)
Lazio (Italy)	3–1	(Turkey) Beşiktaş	1–0	2–1
Celtic (Scotland)	3–1	(England) Liverpool	1–1	2–0
Málaga (Spain)	1–1 (1–4 p)	(Portugal) Boavista	1–0	0–1 (a.e.t.)

=== Matches ===
13 March 2003
22:00

Porto (Portugal)	0–1	(Greece) Panathinaikos
	Report	Olisadebe 73'

Estádio das Antas, Porto
Attendance: 44,310
Referee: Domenico Messina (Italy)
20 March 2003
19:30

Panathinaikos (Greece)	0–2 (a.e.t.)	(Portugal) Porto
	Report	Derlei 16', 103'

Leoforos Alexandras Stadium, Athens
Attendance: 14,295
Referee: René Temmink (Netherlands)

Porto won 2–1 on aggregate.

13 March 2003
21:00

Lazio (Italy)	1–0	(Turkey) Beşiktaş
Inzaghi 55'	Report

Stadio Olimpico, Rome
Attendance: 17,133
Referee: Manuel Mejuto González (Spain)
20 March 2003
20:00

Beşiktaş (Turkey)	1–2	(Italy) Lazio
Sergen 82'	Report	Fiore 5'; Castromán 9'

İnönü Stadium, Istanbul
Attendance: 21,800
Referee: Graham Poll (England)

Lazio won 3–1 on aggregate.

13 March 2003
21:05

Celtic (Scotland)	1–1	(England) Liverpool
Larsson 2'	Report	Heskey 17'

Celtic Park, Glasgow
Attendance: 59,759
Referee: Terje Hauge (Norway)
20 March 2003
21:05

Liverpool (England)	0–2	(Scotland) Celtic
	Report	Thompson 45'; Hartson 82'

Anfield, Liverpool
Attendance: 44,238
Referee: Markus Merk (Germany)

Celtic won 3–1 on aggregate.

13 March 2003
21:30

Málaga (Spain)	1–0	(Portugal) Boavista
Dely Valdés 17'	Report

La Rosaleda Stadium, Málaga
Attendance: 13,269
Referee: Pierluigi Collina (Italy)
20 March 2003
22:00

Boavista (Portugal)	1–0 (a.e.t.)	(Spain) Málaga
Luiz Cláudio 83'	Report
Penalties
Alexandre (penalty scored); Luiz Cláudio (penalty scored); Silva (penalty scored); Ricardo (penalty scored)	4–1	(penalty missed) Bravo; (penalty scored) Miguel Ángel; (penalty missed) Leko

Estádio do Bessa, Porto
Attendance: 8,500
Referee: Gilles Veissière (France)

1–1 on aggregate; Boavista won 4–1 on penalties.

== Semi-finals ==
=== Summary ===
The semi-final draw was held on 21 March 2003. The first legs were played on 10 April, and the second legs were played on 24 April 2003.

Team 1	Agg.	Team 2	1st leg	2nd leg
Porto (Portugal)	4–1	(Italy) Lazio	4–1	0–0
Celtic (Scotland)	2–1	(Portugal) Boavista	1–1	1–0

=== Matches ===
10 April 2003
22:00

Porto (Portugal)	4–1	(Italy) Lazio
Maniche 10'; Derlei 28', 50'; Postiga 56'	Report	López 6'

Estádio das Antas, Porto
Attendance: 45,518
Referee: Kyros Vassaras (Greece)
24 April 2003
21:00

Lazio (Italy)	0–0	(Portugal) Porto
	Report

Stadio Olimpico, Rome
Attendance: 69,873
Referee: Gilles Veissiere (France)

Porto won 4–1 on aggregate.

10 April 2003
20:05

Celtic (Scotland)	1–1	(Portugal) Boavista
Larsson 49'	Report	Valgaeren 48' (o.g.)

Celtic Park, Glasgow
Attendance: 58,240
Referee: Frank De Bleeckere (Belgium)
24 April 2003
21:00

Boavista (Portugal)	0–1	(Scotland) Celtic
	Report	Larsson 79'

Estádio do Bessa, Porto
Attendance: 10,163
Referee: Valentin Ivanov (Russia)

Celtic won 2–1 on aggregate.

== Final ==
The final was played on 21 May 2003 at the Estadio Olímpico de Sevilla in Seville, Spain. A draw was held on 21 March 2003, after the semi-final draw, to determine the "home" team for administrative purposes.

21 May 2003
20:45 UTC+2

Celtic (Scotland)	2–3 (a.e.t.)	(Portugal) Porto
Larsson 47', 57'	Report	Derlei 45+1', 115'; Alenichev 54'

Estadio Olímpico de Sevilla, Seville
Attendance: 52,140
Referee: Ľuboš Micheľ (Slovakia)
