= Angan =

Angan is a surname. Notable people with the surname include:

- Davy Claude Angan (born 1987), Ivorian footballer
- Didié Angan (born 1974), Ivorian footballer
- Pascal Angan (born 1986) is an Ivorian-Beninese footballer
