= 2002–03 UEFA Cup =

32nd season of Europe's secondary club football tournament organised by UEFA

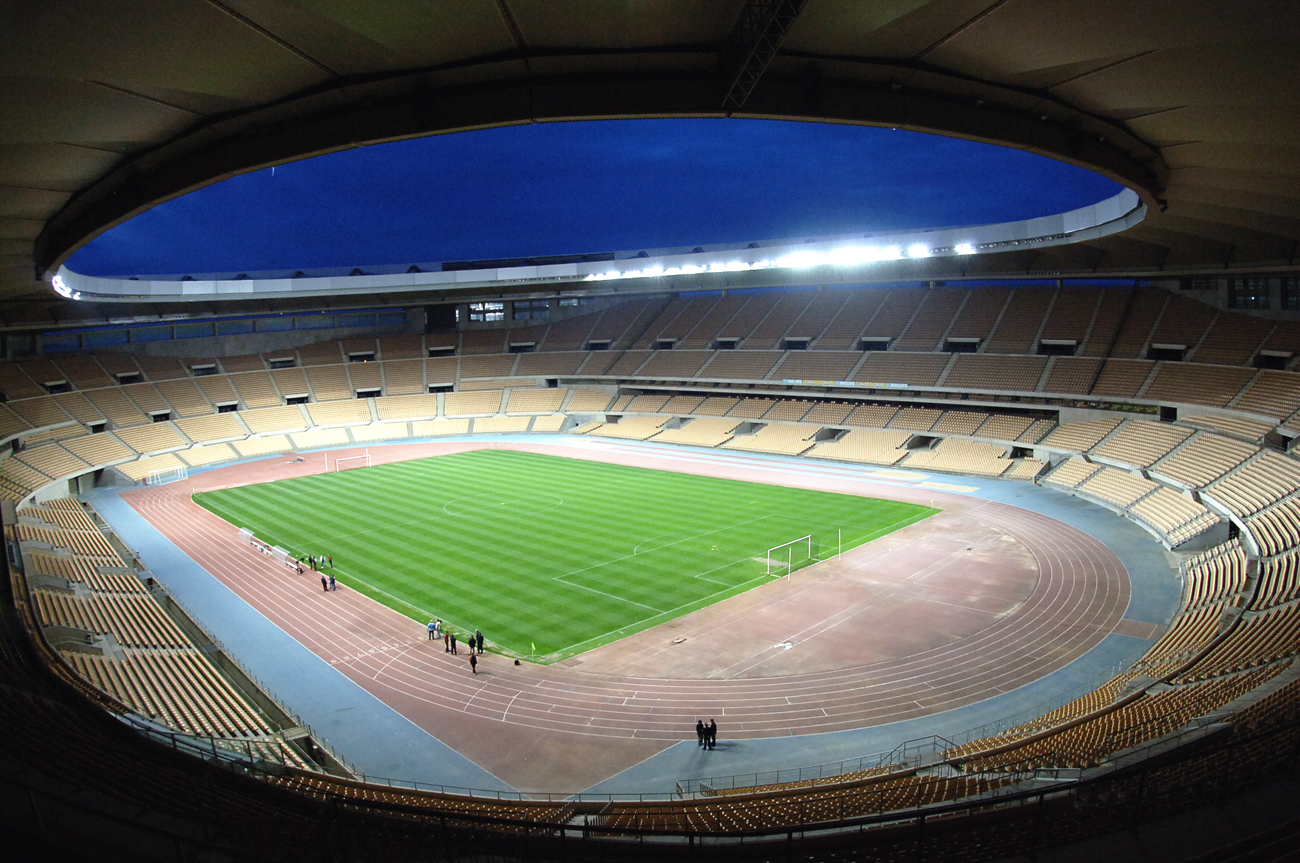
- The Estadio Olímpico de Sevilla hosted the final.

Tournament details
- Dates: 13–29 August 2002 (qualifying); 17 September 2002 – 21 May 2003 (competition proper)
- Teams: 96+8 (competition proper); 121+24 (total) (from 51 associations)

Final positions
- Champions: (Portugal) Porto (1st title)
- Runners-up: (Scotland) Celtic

Tournament statistics
- Matches played: 205
- Goals scored: 576 (2.81 per match)
- Attendance: 3,139,630 (15,315 per match)
- Top scorer(s): Derlei (Porto); 12 goals

The 2002–03 UEFA Cup was the 32nd edition of the UEFA Cup, the second-tier European club football tournament organised by UEFA. The final was played between Portuguese side Porto and Scottish side Celtic at the Estadio Olímpico de Sevilla, Seville, on 21 May 2003. Porto won 3–2 after silver goal extra time and became the first Portuguese team to win the competition.

Feyenoord could not defend their title as they automatically qualified for the 2002–03 UEFA Champions League and were also eliminated from all European competitions after finishing bottom of their group.

== Association team allocation ==
A total of 145 teams from 51 UEFA member associations participated in the 2002–03 UEFA Cup. The association ranking based on the UEFA country coefficients was used to determine the number of participating teams for each association:

- Associations 1–6 each had three teams qualified;
- Associations 7–8 each had four teams qualified;
- Associations 9–15 each had two teams qualified;
- Associations 16–21 each had three teams qualified;
- Associations 22–52 (except Azerbaijan, Liechtenstein, San Marino and Andorra) each had two teams qualified;
- Liechtenstein (as they organized only a domestic cup and no domestic league), San Marino and Andorra had one team qualified;
- The top three associations of the 2001–02 UEFA Respect Fair Play ranking each gained an additional berth;
- Moreover, 24 teams eliminated from the 2002–03 UEFA Champions League were transferred to the UEFA Cup.

The winners of the 2001–02 UEFA Cup were given an additional entry as title holders if they did not qualify for the 2002–03 UEFA Champions League or UEFA Cup through their domestic performance. However, this additional entry was not necessary for this season since the title holders (Feyenoord) qualified for European competitions through their domestic performance.

=== Association ranking ===
For the 2002–03 UEFA Cup, the associations were allocated places according to their 2001 UEFA country coefficients, which took into account their performance in European competitions from 1996–97 to 2000–01.

Apart from the allocation based on the country coefficients, associations had additional teams participating in the UEFA Cup, as noted below:

- (FP) – Additional berth via Fair Play ranking (Norway, England, Czech Republic)
- (UCL) – Additional teams transferred from the Champions League
- (UIC) – Additional teams qualified from the Intertoto Cup

Rank	Association	Coeff.	Teams	Notes
1	Spain	65.210	3	+1 (UIC)
2	Italy	56.239	3	
3	England	51.288	3	+1 (FP) +1 (UIC) +1 (UCL)
4	Germany	48.632	3	+1 (UIC)
5	France	42.352	3	+3 (UCL)
6	Netherlands	30.249	3	
7	Turkey	29.975	4	+1 (UCL)
8	Greece	28.366	4	+1 (UCL)
9	Russia	27.708	2	
10	Portugal	26.274	2	+2 (UCL)
11	Czech Republic	24.791	2	+1 (FP) +2 (UCL)
12	Belgium	24.150	2	+1 (UCL)
13	Ukraine	23.833	2	+2 (UCL)
14	Austria	23.750	2	+2 (UCL)
15	Norway	23.600	2	+1(FP)
16	Scotland	22.625	3	+1 (UCL)
17	Switzerland	21.875	3	
18	Croatia	19.999	3	

Rank	Association	Coeff.	Teams	Notes
19	Sweden	18.208	3	
20	Poland	17.500	3	+1 (UCL)
21	Denmark	17.175	3	+1 (UCL)
22	Romania	15.791	2	
23	FR Yugoslavia	15.415	2	+1 (UCL)
24	Hungary	15.082	2	+1 (UCL)
25	Slovakia	14.665	2	
26	Israel	14.124	2	+1 (UCL)
27	Slovenia	11.998	2	
28	Bulgaria	11.665	2	+1 (UCL)
29	Cyprus	10.832	2	+1 (UCL)
30	Georgia	9.666	2	
31	Finland	8.541	2	
32	Latvia	7.832	2	
33	Iceland	5.332	2	
34	Belarus	4.832	2	
35	Moldova	4.499	2	

Rank	Association	Coeff.	Teams	Notes
36	Lithuania	4.498	2	
37	Macedonia	3.497	2	
38	Republic of Ireland	2.998	2	
39	Estonia	2.498	2	
40	Armenia	2.165	2	
41	Wales	2.165	2	
42	Azerbaijan	1.665	0	
43	Malta	1.665	2	
44	Liechtenstein	1.500	1	
45	Northern Ireland	1.331	2	
46	Bosnia and Herzegovina	1.000	2	+1 (UCL)
47	Luxembourg	0.665	2	
48	Faroe Islands	0.665	2	
49	Albania	0.499	2	
50	San Marino	0.000	1	
51	Andorra	0.000	1	
52	Kazakhstan	0.000	2	

=== Distribution ===
Since the title holders (Feyenoord) qualified for the Champions League through their domestic performance, the first round spot reserved for the title holders was vacated, and the following changes to the default allocation system were made:

- The domestic cup winners of associations 17 (Switzerland) and 18 (Croatia) were promoted from the qualifying round to the first round.

	Teams entering in this round	Teams advancing from previous round	Teams transferred from Champions League and Intertoto Cup
Qualifying round (82 teams)	2 domestic league champions from Andorra and San Marino; 31 domestic cup winners from associations 19–52 (except Azerbaijan, Andorra and San Marino); 33 domestic league runners-up from associations 16–52 (except Azerbaijan, Liechtenstein, Andorra and San Marino); 13 domestic league third-placed teams from associations 9–21; 3 teams which qualified via Fair Play ranking		
First round (96 teams)	18 domestic cup winners from associations 1–18; 2 domestic league third-placed teams from associations 7–8; 5 domestic league fourth-placed teams from associations 4–8; 8 domestic league fifth-placed teams from associations 1–8 (league cup winners for France); 3 domestic league sixth-placed teams from associations 1–3 (league cup winners for England)	41 winners from the qualifying round	16 losers from the Champions League third qualifying round; 3 Intertoto Cup winners
Second round (48 teams)		48 winners from the first round	
Third round (32 teams)		24 winners from the second round	8 third-placed teams from the Champions League first group stage

==== Redistribution rules ====
A UEFA Cup place is vacated when a team qualifies for both the Champions League and the UEFA Cup, or qualifies for the UEFA Cup by more than one method. When a place is vacated, it is redistributed within the national association by the following rules:

- When the domestic cup winners (considered as the "highest-placed" qualifier within the national association with the latest starting round) also qualify for the Champions League, their UEFA Cup place is vacated. As a result, either of the following teams qualify for the UEFA Cup:
  - The domestic cup runners-up, provided they have not yet qualified for European competitions, qualify for the UEFA Cup as the "lowest-placed" qualifier (with the earliest starting round), with the other UEFA Cup qualifiers moved up one "place".
  - Otherwise, the highest-placed team in the league which have not yet qualified for European competitions qualify for the UEFA Cup, with the UEFA Cup qualifiers that finish above them in the league, moved up one "place".
- When the domestic cup winners also qualify for the UEFA Cup through league position, their place through the league position is vacated. As a result, the highest-placed team in the league which have not yet qualified for European competitions qualify for the UEFA Cup, with the UEFA Cup qualifiers that finish above them in the league moved up one "place" if possible.
- For associations where a UEFA Cup place is reserved for the League Cup winners, they always qualify for the UEFA Cup as the "lowest-placed" qualifier (or as the second "lowest-placed" qualifier in cases where the cup runners-up qualify as stated above). If the League Cup winners have already qualified for European competitions through other methods, this reserved UEFA Cup place is taken by the highest-placed league team in the league which have not yet qualified for European competitions.
- A Fair Play place is taken by the highest-ranked team in the domestic Fair Play table which have not yet qualified for European competitions.

=== Teams ===
The labels in the parentheses show how each team qualified for the place of its starting round:

- TH: Title holders
- CW: Cup winners
- CR: Cup runners-up
- LC: League Cup winners
- 1st, 2nd, 3rd, 4th, 5th, 6th, etc.: League position
- FP: Fair Play
- IC: UEFA Intertoto Cup winners
- CL: Transferred from the Champions League
  - GS1: Third-placed teams from the first group stage
  - Q3: Losers from the third qualifying round

Third round
(England) Liverpool (CL GS1)	(France) Lens (CL GS1)	(Greece) AEK Athens (CL GS1)	(Ukraine) Dynamo Kyiv (CL GS1)
(France) Lyon (CL GS1)	(France) Auxerre (CL GS1)	(Belgium) Club Brugge (CL GS1)	(Israel) Maccabi Haifa (CL GS1)
First round
(Spain) Celta Vigo (5th)	(France) Bordeaux (LC)	(Czech Republic) Slavia Prague (CW)	(Austria) Sturm Graz (CL Q3)
(Spain) Real Betis (6th)	(Netherlands) Heerenveen (4th)	(Belgium) Anderlecht (3rd)	(Austria) GAK (CL Q3)
(Spain) Alavés (7th)	(Netherlands) Vitesse (5th)	(Ukraine) Metalurh Donetsk (3rd)	(Scotland) Celtic (CL Q3)
(Italy) Parma (CW)	(Netherlands) Utrecht (CR)	Austria Wien (4th)	(Poland) Legia Warsaw (CL Q3)
(Italy) Chievo (5th)	(Turkey) Kocaelispor (CW)	(Norway) Viking (CW)	(Denmark) Brøndby (CL Q3)
(Italy) Lazio (6th)	(Turkey) Beşiktaş (3rd)	(Scotland) Rangers (CW)	(Federal Republic of Yugoslavia) Partizan (CL Q3)
(England) Leeds United (5th)	(Turkey) Ankaragücü (4th)	(Switzerland) Grasshopper (2nd)	(Hungary) Zalaegerszeg (CL Q3)
(England) Chelsea (6th)	(Turkey) Denizlispor (5th)	(Croatia) Dinamo Zagreb (CW)	(Bulgaria) Levski Sofia (CL Q3)
(England) Blackburn Rovers (LC)	(Greece) Panathinaikos (3rd)	(Turkey) Fenerbahçe (CL Q3)	(Cyprus) APOEL (CL Q3)
(Germany) Schalke 04 (CW)	(Greece) PAOK (4th)	(Portugal) Sporting CP (CL Q3)	(Bosnia and Herzegovina) Željezničar (CL Q3)
(Germany) Hertha BSC (4th)	(Greece) Skoda Xanthi (5th)	(Portugal) Boavista (CL Q3)	(Spain) Málaga (IC)
(Germany) Werder Bremen (6th)	(Greece) Iraklis (6th)	(Czech Republic) Slovan Liberec (CL Q3)	(England) Fulham (IC)
(France) Lorient (CW)	(Russia) CSKA Moscow (CW)	(Czech Republic) Sparta Prague (CL Q3)	(Germany) VfB Stuttgart (IC)
(France) Paris Saint-Germain (4th)	(Portugal) Porto (3rd)	(Ukraine) Shakhtar Donetsk (CL Q3)	
Qualifying round
(Russia) Zenit Saint Petersburg (3rd)	(Denmark) Midtjylland (3rd)	(Latvia) Ventspils (2nd)	(Malta) Birkirkara (CW)
(Portugal) Leixões (CR)	(Romania) Rapid București (CW)	(Latvia) Liepājas Metalurgs (3rd)	(Malta) Sliema Wanderers (2nd)
(Czech Republic) Viktoria Žižkov (3rd)	(Romania) Național București (2nd)	(Iceland) Fylkir (CW)	(Liechtenstein) Vaduz (CW)
(Belgium) Mouscron (CR)	(Federal Republic of Yugoslavia) Red Star Belgrade (CW)	(Iceland) ÍBV (2nd)	(Northern Ireland) Linfield (CW)
(Ukraine) Metalurh Zaporizhzhia (4th)	(Federal Republic of Yugoslavia) Sartid (3rd)	(Belarus) Gomel (CW)	(Northern Ireland) Glentoran (2nd)
(Austria) Kärnten (5th)	(Hungary) Újpest (CW)	(Belarus) Dinamo Minsk (2nd)	(Bosnia and Herzegovina) Sarajevo (CW)
(Norway) Stabæk (4th)	(Hungary) Ferencváros (2nd)	(Moldova) Nistru Otaci (2nd)	(Bosnia and Herzegovina) Široki Brijeg (2nd)
(Scotland) Livingston (3rd)	(Slovakia) Koba Senec (CW)	(Moldova) Zimbru Chișinău (3rd)	(Luxembourg) Avenir Beggen (CW)
(Scotland) Aberdeen (4th)	(Slovakia) Matador Púchov (2nd)	(Lithuania) Atlantas (2nd)	(Luxembourg) Grevenmacher (2nd)
(Switzerland) Lugano (3rd)	(Israel) Maccabi Tel Aviv (CW)	(Lithuania) Sūduva (CR)	(Faroe Islands) GÍ (2nd)
(Switzerland) Servette (4th)	(Israel) Hapoel Tel Aviv (2nd)	(North Macedonia) Pobeda (CW)	(Faroe Islands) KÍ (CR)
(Croatia) Hajduk Split (2nd)	(Slovenia) Gorica (CW)	(North Macedonia) Belasica (2nd)	(Albania) Tirana (CW)
(Croatia) Varteks (4th)	(Slovenia) Primorje (2nd)	(Republic of Ireland) Dundalk (CW)	(Albania) Partizani (3rd)
(Sweden) Djurgårdens IF (2nd)	(Bulgaria) Litex Lovech (2nd)	(Republic of Ireland) Shamrock Rovers (2nd)	(San Marino) Domagnano (1st)
(Sweden) AIK (3rd)	(Bulgaria) CSKA Sofia (CR)	(Estonia) Levadia Tallinn (CW)	(Andorra) Encamp (1st)
(Sweden) IFK Göteborg (4th)	(Cyprus) Anorthosis Famagusta (CW)	(Estonia) TVMK (2nd)	(Kazakhstan) Kairat (CW)
(Poland) Wisła Kraków (CW)	(Cyprus) AEL Limassol (3rd)	(Armenia) Zvartnots Yerevan (2nd)	(Kazakhstan) Atyrau (2nd)
(Poland) Amica Wronki (3rd)	(Georgia (country)) Locomotive Tbilisi (CW)	(Armenia) Spartak Yerevan (3rd)	(England) Ipswich Town (FP)
(Poland) Polonia Warsaw (4th)	(Georgia (country)) Dinamo Tbilisi (3rd)	(Wales) Total Network Solutions (2nd)	(Czech Republic) Sigma Olomouc (FP)
(Denmark) Odense (CW)	(Finland) HJK (2nd)	(Wales) Bangor City (3rd)	(Norway) Brann (FP)
(Denmark) Copenhagen (2nd)	(Finland) MYPA (3rd)		

Notes

1. Austria (AUT): Tirol Innsbruck, the winners of the 2001–02 Austrian Football Bundesliga, declared bankruptcy and could not take part in the European competitions. As a result, their Champions League third qualifying round berth was given to GAK, the third-placed team of the league, and the UEFA Cup qualifying round place was given to Kärnten, the fifth-placed team of the league.
2. Azerbaijan (AZE): In 2002, Azerbaijani clubs were banned from the European competitions for a period of two years, in response to a long-standing conflict between the national football association and the majority of the top-flight clubs.
3. Finland (FIN): Atlantis, the winners of the 2001 Finnish Cup, declared bankruptcy and could not take part in the European competitions. Since cup runners-up Tampere United qualified for the Champions League as winners of the 2001 Veikkausliiga, their berth was given to MYPA, the third-placed team of the league.
4. Latvia (LVA): The revised schedule of the Latvian Cup, the domestic cup competition, overlapped with the UEFA Cup competition schedule. As a result, the domestic cup winner did not qualify for the UEFA Cup this season, and its berth was given to Liepājas Metalurgs, the 3rd-placed team of the 2001 Latvian Higher League.
5. Sweden (SWE): The revised schedule of the Svenska Cupen, the domestic cup competition, overlapped with the UEFA Cup competition schedule. As a result, the domestic cup winner did not qualify for the UEFA Cup this season, and its berth was given to IFK Göteborg, the fourth-placed team of the 2001 Allsvenskan.

== Round and draw dates ==
The schedule of the competition was as follows (all draws held at UEFA headquarters in Nyon, Switzerland, unless stated otherwise).

Round	Draw date	First leg	Second leg
Qualifying round	21 June 2002	15 August 2002	29 August 2002
First round	30 August 2002	19 September 2002	3 October 2002
Second round	8 October 2002	31 October 2002	14 November 2002
Third round	15 November 2002	28 November 2002	12 December 2002
Fourth round	13 December 2002	20 February 2003	27 February 2003
Quarter-finals	13 December 2002	13 March 2003	20 March 2003
Semi-finals	21 March 2003	10 April 2003	24 April 2003
Final	21 March 2003	21 May 2003 at Estadio Olímpico, Seville	

== Qualifying round ==
The draw was held on 21 June 2002 in Geneva, Switzerland. The first legs were played on 13 and 15 August, and the second legs were played on 29 August 2002.

Team 1	Agg.	Team 2	1st leg	2nd leg
Litex Lovech (Bulgaria)	8–1	(Lithuania) Atlantas	5–0	3–1
Encamp (Andorra)	0–13	(Russia) Zenit Saint Petersburg	0–5	0–8
Atyrau (Kazakhstan)	0–2	(Slovakia) Matador Púchov	0–0	0–2
Glentoran (Northern Ireland)	0–6	(Poland) Wisła Kraków	0–2	0–4
Pobeda (North Macedonia)	2–3	(Denmark) Midtjylland	2–0	0–3 (a.e.t.)
Primorje (Slovenia)	6–3	(Armenia) Zvartnots Yerevan	6–1	0–2
Ventspils (Latvia)	3–1	(Switzerland) Lugano	3–0	0–1
Hapoel Tel Aviv (Israel)	5–1	(Albania) Partizani	1–0	4–1
Ferencváros (Hungary)	5–2	(Cyprus) AEL Limassol	4–0	1–2
Hajduk Split (Croatia)	11–0	(Faroe Islands) GÍ	3–0	8–0
Brann (Norway)	4–6	(Lithuania) Sūduva	2–3	2–3
Amica Wronki (Poland)	12–2	(Wales) Total Network Solutions	5–0	7–2
Copenhagen (Denmark)	7–2	(Georgia (country)) Locomotive Tbilisi	3–1	4–1
Liepājas Metalurgs (Latvia)	2–6	(Austria) Kärnten	0–2	2–4
Vaduz (Liechtenstein)	1–1 (a)	(Scotland) Livingston	1–1	0–0
Sliema Wanderers (Malta)	1–5	(Poland) Polonia Warsaw	1–3	0–2
Anorthosis Famagusta (Cyprus)	3–2	(Luxembourg) Grevenmacher	3–0	0–2
Levadia Tallinn (Estonia)	0–4	(Israel) Maccabi Tel Aviv	0–2	0–2
Leixões (Portugal)	4–3	(North Macedonia) Belasica	2–2	2–1
Sigma Olomouc (Czech Republic)	3–3 (3–5 p)	(Bosnia and Herzegovina) Sarajevo	2–1	1–2 (a.e.t.)
Zimbru Chișinău (Moldova)	5–3	(Sweden) IFK Göteborg	3–1	2–2
KÍ (Faroe Islands)	2–3	(Hungary) Újpest	2–2	0–1
MYPA (Finland)	1–2	(Denmark) Odense	1–0	0–2
Dinamo Minsk (Belarus)	1–5	(Bulgaria) CSKA Sofia	1–4	0–1
Dinamo Tbilisi (Georgia (country))	5–1	(Estonia) TVMK	4–1	1–0
Spartak Yerevan (Armenia)	0–5	(Switzerland) Servette	0–2	0–3
Shamrock Rovers (Republic of Ireland)	1–5	(Sweden) Djurgårdens IF	1–3	0–2
Varteks (Croatia)	9–0	(Republic of Ireland) Dundalk	5–0	4–0
Gomel (Belarus)	5–0	(Finland) HJK	1–0	4–0
Aberdeen (Scotland)	1–0	(Moldova) Nistru Otaci	1–0	0–0
AIK (Sweden)	5–1	(Iceland) ÍBV	2–0	3–1
Rapid București (Romania)	5–1	(Slovenia) Gorica	2–0	3–1
Domagnano (San Marino)	0–5	(Czech Republic) Viktoria Žižkov	0–2	0–3
Kairat (Kazakhstan)	0–5	(Federal Republic of Yugoslavia) Red Star Belgrade	0–2	0–3
Metalurh Zaporizhzhia (Ukraine)	3–0	(Malta) Birkirkara	3–0	0–0
Bangor City (Wales)	1–2	(Federal Republic of Yugoslavia) Sartid	1–0	0–2
Koba Senec (Slovakia)	1–5	(Bosnia and Herzegovina) Široki Brijeg	1–2	0–3
Tirana (Albania)	2–3	(Romania) Național București	0–1	2–2
Avenir Beggen (Luxembourg)	1–9	(England) Ipswich Town	0–1	1–8
Fylkir (Iceland)	2–4	(Belgium) Mouscron	1–1	1–3
Stabæk (Norway)	5–1	(Northern Ireland) Linfield	4–0	1–1

== First round ==
The draw was held on 30 August 2002 in Monaco. The first legs were played on 17 and 19 September, and the second legs were played on 1 and 3 October 2002.

Team 1	Agg.	Team 2	1st leg	2nd leg
Paris Saint-Germain (France)	4–0	(Hungary) Újpest	3–0	1–0
Sporting CP (Portugal)	4–6	(Federal Republic of Yugoslavia) Partizan	1–3	3–3 (a.e.t.)
Legia Warsaw (Poland)	7–2	(Netherlands) Utrecht	4–1	3–1
Zimbru Chișinău (Moldova)	1–4	(Spain) Real Betis	0–2	1–2
Beşiktaş (Turkey)	7–2	(Bosnia and Herzegovina) Sarajevo	2–2	5–0
CSKA Moscow (Russia)	3–4	(Italy) Parma	1–1	2–3
Levski Sofia (Bulgaria)	5–2	(Denmark) Brøndby	4–1	1–1
Anderlecht (Belgium)	2–2 (a)	(Norway) Stabæk	0–1	2–1
Național București (Romania)	3–2	(Netherlands) Heerenveen	3–0	0–2
Lazio (Italy)	4–0	(Greece) Skoda Xanthi	4–0	0–0
Aberdeen (Scotland)	0–1	(Germany) Hertha BSC	0–0	0–1
Ipswich Town (England)	2–1	(Federal Republic of Yugoslavia) Sartid	1–1	1–0
Maccabi Tel Aviv (Israel)	2–4	(Portugal) Boavista	1–0	1–4
AIK (Sweden)	4–6	(Turkey) Fenerbahçe	3–3	1–3
Sparta Prague (Czech Republic)	4–0	(Bosnia and Herzegovina) Široki Brijeg	3–0	1–0
Austria Wien	5–2	(Ukraine) Shakhtar Donetsk	5–1	0–1
Denizlispor (Turkey)	3–3 (a)	(France) Lorient	2–0	1–3
Chelsea (England)	4–5	(Norway) Viking	2–1	2–4
Kärnten (Austria)	1–4	(Israel) Hapoel Tel Aviv	0–4	1–0
VfB Stuttgart (Germany)	8–2	(Latvia) Ventspils	4–1	4–1
Dinamo Zagreb (Croatia)	9–1	(Hungary) Zalaegerszeg	6–0	3–1
Copenhagen (Denmark)	1–3	(Sweden) Djurgårdens IF	0–0	1–3
Viktoria Žižkov (Czech Republic)	3–3 (a)	(Scotland) Rangers	2–0	1–3 (a.e.t.)
Vitesse (Netherlands)	2–1	(Romania) Rapid București	1–1	1–0
Leeds United (England)	2–1	(Ukraine) Metalurh Zaporizhzhia	1–0	1–1
Servette (Switzerland)	4–4 (a)	(Poland) Amica Wronki	2–3	2–1
Sturm Graz (Austria)	8–6	(Scotland) Livingston	5–2	3–4
Ferencváros (Hungary)	5–0	(Turkey) Kocaelispor	4–0	1–0
Željezničar (Bosnia and Herzegovina)	0–1	(Spain) Málaga	0–0	0–1
Bordeaux (France)	10–1	(Slovakia) Matador Púchov	6–0	4–1
Slovan Liberec (Czech Republic)	4–2	(Georgia (country)) Dinamo Tbilisi	3–2	1–0
Leixões (Portugal)	3–5	(Greece) PAOK	2–1	1–4
Litex Lovech (Bulgaria)	1–3	(Greece) Panathinaikos	0–1	1–2 (a.e.t.)
Red Star Belgrade (Federal Republic of Yugoslavia)	2–0	(Italy) Chievo	0–0	2–0
Hajduk Split (Croatia)	2–3	(England) Fulham	0–1	2–2
Primorje (Slovenia)	1–8	(Poland) Wisła Kraków	0–2	1–6
APOEL (Cyprus)	3–1	(Austria) GAK	2–0	1–1
Celta Vigo (Spain)	2–1	(Denmark) Odense	2–0	0–1
Metalurh Donetsk (Ukraine)	2–10	(Germany) Werder Bremen	2–2	0–8
Celtic (Scotland)	10–1	(Lithuania) Sūduva	8–1	2–0
Porto (Portugal)	6–2	(Poland) Polonia Warsaw	6–0	0–2
Gomel (Belarus)	1–8	(Germany) Schalke 04	1–4	0–4
Grasshopper (Switzerland)	4–3	(Russia) Zenit Saint Petersburg	3–1	1–2
Ankaragücü (Turkey)	1–5	(Spain) Alavés	1–2	0–3
Iraklis (Greece)	5–5 (a)	(Cyprus) Anorthosis Famagusta	4–2	1–3
Midtjylland (Denmark)	2–1	(Croatia) Varteks	1–0	1–1
Blackburn Rovers (England)	4–4 (a)	(Bulgaria) CSKA Sofia	1–1	3–3
Mouscron (Belgium)	3–7	(Czech Republic) Slavia Prague	2–2	1–5

== Second round ==
The draw was held on 8 October 2002 in Nyon, Switzerland. The first legs were played on 29 and 31 October, and the second legs were played on 7, 12 and 14 November 2002.

Team 1	Agg.	Team 2	1st leg	2nd leg
Viktoria Žižkov (Czech Republic)	0–4	(Spain) Real Betis	0–1	0–3
Legia Warsaw (Poland)	2–3	(Germany) Schalke 04	2–3	0–0
Djurgårdens IF (Sweden)	1–3	(France) Bordeaux	0–1	1–2
APOEL (Cyprus)	0–5	(Germany) Hertha BSC	0–1	0–4
Dinamo Zagreb (Croatia)	1–5	(England) Fulham	0–3	1–2
Sparta Prague (Czech Republic)	1–2	(Turkey) Denizlispor	1–0	0–2
Ferencváros (Hungary)	0–2	(Germany) VfB Stuttgart	0–0	0–2
Sturm Graz (Austria)	1–1 (8–7 p)	(Bulgaria) Levski Sofia	1–0	0–1 (a.e.t.)
Partizan (Federal Republic of Yugoslavia)	4–6	(Czech Republic) Slavia Prague	3–1	1–5 (a.e.t.)
Național București (Romania)	0–3	(France) Paris Saint-Germain	0–2	0–1
Fenerbahçe (Turkey)	2–5	(Greece) Panathinaikos	1–1	1–4
PAOK (Greece)	3–2	(Switzerland) Grasshopper	2–1	1–1
Lazio (Italy)	2–1	(Federal Republic of Yugoslavia) Red Star Belgrade	1–0	1–1
Anderlecht (Belgium)	6–1	(Denmark) Midtjylland	3–1	3–0
Austria Wien	0–3	(Portugal) Porto	0–1	0–2
Vitesse (Netherlands)	5–4	(Germany) Werder Bremen	2–1	3–3
Ipswich Town (England)	1–1 (2–4 p)	(Czech Republic) Slovan Liberec	1–0	0–1 (a.e.t.)
Alavés (Spain)	1–2	(Turkey) Beşiktaş	1–1	0–1
Parma (Italy)	3–5	(Poland) Wisła Kraków	2–1	1–4 (a.e.t.)
Leeds United (England)	5–1	(Israel) Hapoel Tel Aviv	1–0	4–1
Celtic (Scotland)	3–0	(England) Blackburn Rovers	1–0	2–0
Málaga (Spain)	4–2	(Poland) Amica Wronki	2–1	2–1
Celta Vigo (Spain)	4–1	(Norway) Viking	3–0	1–1
Boavista (Portugal)	3–1	(Cyprus) Anorthosis Famagusta	2–1	1–0

== Final phase ==
In the final phase, teams played against each other over two legs on a home-and-away basis, except for the one-match final. The mechanism of the draws for each round was as follows:

- In the draws for the third and fourth rounds, teams were seeded and divided into groups containing an equal number of seeded and unseeded teams. In each group, the seeded teams were drawn against the unseeded teams, with the first team drawn hosting the first leg. Teams from the same association could not be drawn against each other.
- In the draws for the quarter-finals onwards, there were no seedings and teams from the same association could be drawn against each other.

=== Bracket ===
Third round
(Scotland) Celtic (a)	1	1	2
(Spain) Celta Vigo	0	2	2
(Belgium) Club Brugge	1	0	1
(Germany) VfB Stuttgart	2	1	3
(Spain) Real Betis	1	0	1
(France) Auxerre	0	2	2
(Netherlands) Vitesse	0	0	0
(England) Liverpool	1	1	2
(Spain) Málaga	0	2	2
(England) Leeds United	0	1	1
(Greece) AEK Athens	4	4	8
(Israel) Maccabi Haifa	0	1	1
(Germany) Hertha BSC	2	0	2
(England) Fulham	1	0	1
(France) Paris Saint-Germain	2	0	2
(Portugal) Boavista (a)	1	1	2
(Portugal) Porto	3	0	3
(France) Lens	0	1	1
(Turkey) Denizlispor	0	1	1
(France) Lyon	0	0	0
(Czech Republic) Slovan Liberec	2	0	2
(Greece) Panathinaikos	2	1	3
(France) Bordeaux	0	2	2
(Belgium) Anderlecht	2	2	4
(Austria) Sturm Graz	1	1	2
(Italy) Lazio	3	0	3
(Poland) Wisła Kraków	1	4	5
(Germany) Schalke 04	1	1	2
(Greece) PAOK	1	0	1
(Czech Republic) Slavia Prague	0	4	4
(Turkey) Beşiktaş	3	0	3
(Ukraine) Dynamo Kyiv	1	0	1

Fourth round
(Scotland) Celtic	3	2	5
(Germany) VfB Stuttgart	1	3	4
(France) Auxerre	0	0	0
(England) Liverpool	1	2	3
(Spain) Málaga	0	1	1
(Greece) AEK Athens	0	0	0
(Germany) Hertha BSC	3	0	3
(Portugal) Boavista (a)	2	1	3
(Portugal) Porto	6	2	8
(Turkey) Denizlispor	1	2	3
(Greece) Panathinaikos	3	0	3
(Belgium) Anderlecht	0	2	2
(Italy) Lazio	3	2	5
(Poland) Wisła Kraków	3	1	4
(Czech Republic) Slavia Prague	1	2	3
(Turkey) Beşiktaş	0	4	4

Quarter-finals
(Scotland) Celtic	1	2	3
(England) Liverpool	1	0	1
(Spain) Málaga	1	0	1 (1)
(Portugal) Boavista (p)	0	1	1 (4)
(Portugal) Porto (a.e.t.)	0	2	2
(Greece) Panathinaikos	1	0	1
(Italy) Lazio	1	2	3
(Turkey) Beşiktaş	0	1	1

Semi-finals
(Scotland) Celtic	1	1	2
(Portugal) Boavista	1	0	1
(Portugal) Porto	4	0	4
(Italy) Lazio	1	0	1

Final
21 May – Seville
(Scotland) Celtic	2
(Portugal) Porto (a.e.t.)	3

=== Third round ===
The draw was held on 15 November 2002 in Geneva, Switzerland. The first legs were played on 26 and 28 November, and the second legs were played on 10 and 12 December 2002.

Team 1	Agg.	Team 2	1st leg	2nd leg
Hertha BSC (Germany)	2–1	(England) Fulham	2–1	0–0
Paris Saint-Germain (France)	2–2 (a)	(Portugal) Boavista	2–1	0–1
Wisła Kraków (Poland)	5–2	(Germany) Schalke 04	1–1	4–1
Denizlispor (Turkey)	1–0	(France) Lyon	0–0	1–0
Slovan Liberec (Czech Republic)	2–3	(Greece) Panathinaikos	2–2	0–1
Beşiktaş (Turkey)	3–1	(Ukraine) Dynamo Kyiv	3–1	0–0
Bordeaux (France)	2–4	(Belgium) Anderlecht	0–2	2–2
PAOK (Greece)	1–4	(Czech Republic) Slavia Prague	1–0	0–4
AEK Athens (Greece)	8–1	(Israel) Maccabi Haifa	4–0	4–1
Sturm Graz (Austria)	2–3	(Italy) Lazio	1–3	1–0
Club Brugge (Belgium)	1–3	(Germany) VfB Stuttgart	1–2	0–1
Vitesse (Netherlands)	0–2	(England) Liverpool	0–1	0–1
Celtic (Scotland)	2–2 (a)	(Spain) Celta Vigo	1–0	1–2
Real Betis (Spain)	1–2	(France) Auxerre	1–0	0–2
Málaga (Spain)	2–1	(England) Leeds United	0–0	2–1
Porto (Portugal)	3–1	(France) Lens	3–0	0–1

=== Fourth round ===
The draw for the fourth round was held on 13 December 2002. The first legs were played on 20 February, and the second legs were played on 27 February 2003.

Team 1	Agg.	Team 2	1st leg	2nd leg
Hertha BSC (Germany)	3–3 (a)	(Portugal) Boavista	3–2	0–1
Panathinaikos (Greece)	3–2	(Belgium) Anderlecht	3–0	0–2
Slavia Prague (Czech Republic)	3–4	(Turkey) Beşiktaş	1–0	2–4
Auxerre (France)	0–3	(England) Liverpool	0–1	0–2
Lazio (Italy)	5–4	(Poland) Wisła Kraków	3–3	2–1
Málaga (Spain)	1–0	(Greece) AEK Athens	0–0	1–0
Celtic (Scotland)	5–4	(Germany) VfB Stuttgart	3–1	2–3
Porto (Portugal)	8–3	(Turkey) Denizlispor	6–1	2–2

=== Quarter-finals ===
The quarter-final draw was held on 13 December 2002, immediately after the fourth round draw. The first legs were played on 13 March, and the second legs were played on 20 March 2003.

Team 1	Agg.	Team 2	1st leg	2nd leg
Porto (Portugal)	2–1	(Greece) Panathinaikos	0–1	2–0 (a.e.t.)
Lazio (Italy)	3–1	(Turkey) Beşiktaş	1–0	2–1
Celtic (Scotland)	3–1	(England) Liverpool	1–1	2–0
Málaga (Spain)	1–1 (1–4 p)	(Portugal) Boavista	1–0	0–1 (a.e.t.)

=== Semi-finals ===
The semi-final draw was held on 21 March 2003. The first legs were played on 10 April, and the second legs were played on 24 April 2003.

Team 1	Agg.	Team 2	1st leg	2nd leg
Porto (Portugal)	4–1	(Italy) Lazio	4–1	0–0
Celtic (Scotland)	2–1	(Portugal) Boavista	1–1	1–0

=== Final ===
The final was played on 21 May 2003 at the Estadio Olímpico de Sevilla in Seville, Spain. A draw was held on 21 March 2003, after the semi-final draw, to determine the "home" team for administrative purposes.

21 May 2003
20:45 UTC+2

Celtic (Scotland)	2–3 (a.e.t.)	(Portugal) Porto
Larsson 47', 57'	Report	Derlei 45+1', 115'; Alenichev 54'

Estadio Olímpico de Sevilla, Seville
Attendance: 52,140
Referee: Ľuboš Micheľ (Slovakia)

== Top goalscorers ==
Rank	Name	Team	Goals	Minutes played
1	(Brazil) Derlei	(Portugal) Porto	12	1,159
2	(Sweden) Henrik Larsson	(Scotland) Celtic	11	887
3	(Poland) Maciej Żurawski	(Poland) Wisła Kraków	9	723
4	(Serbia and Montenegro) Nenad Jestrović	(Belgium) Anderlecht	7	413
5	(Turkey) Mustafa Özkan	(Turkey) Denizlispor	6	630
6	(Serbia and Montenegro) Stanko Svitlica	(Poland) Legia Warsaw	5	334
6	(France) Jean-Claude Darcheville	(France) Bordeaux	5	460
6	(Hungary) Imre Szabics	(Austria) Sturm Graz	5	532
6	(England) Alan Smith	(England) Leeds United	5	540
6	(Czech Republic) Štěpán Vachoušek	(Czech Republic) Slavia Prague	5	687
6	(Portugal) Hélder Postiga	(Portugal) Porto	5	736
6	(Panama) Julio Dely Valdés	(Spain) Málaga	5	822
Source: UEFA

== See also ==
- 2002–03 UEFA Champions League
- 2003 UEFA Super Cup
