= Stanley Udenkwor =

Nigerian footballer (born 1981)

Personal information
- Full name: Stanley Obumneme Udenkwor
- Date of birth: 1 May 1981 (age 45)
- Place of birth: Awka-Etiti, Nigeria
- Height: 1.79 m (5 ft 10 in)
- Position: Striker

Senior career*
Years	Team	Apps	(Gls)
2000	Jasper United		
2001–2002	Polonia Warsaw	30	(1)
2003	Okęcie Warsaw		
2004	Neftchi Baku	11	(6)
2005	Gainsborough Trinity	5	(0)
2006	Podbeskidzie Bielsko-Biała	12	(1)
2007	Mazur Karczew		
2007	Chrobry Głogów	8	(0)
- * Club domestic league appearances and goals

Stanley Obumneme Udenkwor (born 1 May 1981) is a Nigerian former professional footballer who played as a striker.

== Life and Career ==
Udenkwor was born on May 1, 1981 in Awka-Etiti, Nigeria. He started his career off in his native Nigeria playing for Jasper United. In 2001, Udenkwor moved to Poland and signed with Polonia Warsaw. Udenkwor successfully applied for a Polish passport, and in turn became a citizen. He became the second African footballer to become a Polish citizen, the other being Emmanuel Olisadebe, who went on to feature for the Polish international team. Incidentally Olisadebe also started his career at Jasper United. His next football move was to sign for Okęcie Warsaw, before spending time in the Azerbaijan Premier League with Neftchi Baku. He then moved to England and joined Gainsborough Trinity, playing in the Conference North league. Udenkwor was firstly given a trial by the club's manager Paul Mitchell, and after scoring a hat-trick in his debut for the reserves, he was given a short-term contract.

His stay at Gainsborough was well covered in the local media, mainly down to the fact that while at Polonia Warsaw he featured in the UEFA Champions League, which was a notable achievement for any player playing at that level in the English game.

After only five games, including a 1-3 home defeat to Barnet in the first round of the FA Cup, Stanley was released by Trinity. He returned to Poland and signed for Podbeskidzie Bielsko-Biała, and later went on to play for Mazur Karczew before joining Chrobry Głogów.
