= Jiří Sabou =

Czech footballer

Personal information
- Full name: Jiří Sabou
- Date of birth: 5 December 1974 (age 51)
- Place of birth: Beroun, Czechoslovakia
- Height: 1.84 m (6 ft 0 in)
- Position: Midfielder

Youth career
- –1998: Beroun

Senior career*
Years	Team	Apps	(Gls)
1998–2004	Viktoria Žižkov	130	(16)
2004–2008	Teplice	111	(12)
2009	Viktoria Žižkov	12	(1)
Total		253	(29)
- * Club domestic league appearances and goals as of 7 November 2008

Jiří Sabou (born 5 December 1974 in Beroun) is a Czech former professional footballer who played as a midfielder.

== Career ==
Born in Beroun, Sabou began playing youth football for FK Beroun. He joined FK Viktoria Žižkov in 1998 and would play for the club until it was relegated from the Czech top flight in 2004. Sabou joined FK Teplice for the next four seasons. He rejoined Viktoria Žižkov in January 2009, and in his first match on 22 February 2009 he received a yellow card after 10 minutes and then scored an equaliser with the last touch of the game, 3 minutes into time added on.
