= Grégory Molitor =

Luxembourgish footballer

Personal information
- Date of birth: 12 March 1980 (age 46)
- Place of birth: Luxembourg
- Position: Midfielder

Senior career*
Years	Team	Apps	(Gls)
1997–2003	Avenir Beggen	100	(14)
2003–2004	F91 Dudelange	5	(0)
2004–2008	Swift Hesperange	48	(4)
2008–2010	Avenir Beggen	39	(2)
2010–2013	CS Pétange	46	(2)
2013–2014	FC Lorentzweiler		
2014–2017	US Rumelange	1	(0)
2017–2018	Minerva Lintgen		
2018–2019	FC Munsbach		
Total		239	(22)

International career^{‡}
2002–2004	Luxembourg	11	(0)
- * Club domestic league appearances and goals as of 27 June 2023 ‡ National team caps and goals as of 14 September 2009

Grégory Molitor (born 12 March 1980) is a former Luxembourgish professional football player.
