= Alexandre Goulart =

Brazilian footballer (born 1976)

Personal information
- Full name: Alexandre Luiz Goulart
- Date of birth: July 24, 1976 (age 50)
- Place of birth: São João del Rei, Brazil
- Position: Forward

Senior career*
Years	Team	Apps	(Gls)
1997–1998	Cruzeiro		
1999	SC Internacional		
2000	Cruzeiro		
2000–2002	Boavista F.C.	40	(7)
2002–2006	C.D. Nacional	84	(18)
2006	Corinthians Alagoano	0	(0)
2006–2007	Shimizu S-Pulse	7	(0)
- * Club domestic league appearances and goals as of October 31, 2007 ‡ National team caps and goals as of October 31, 2007

Alexandre Luiz Goulart (born July 24, 1976), sometimes known as just Alexandre, is a Brazilian football player.

Alexandre Goulart appearance in two Campeonato Brasileiro matches for Sport Club Internacional. He spent several years playing football for Boavista F.C. and C.D. Nacional in the Portuguese Liga.

== Club statistics ==
Club performance			League	
Season	Club	League	Apps	Goals
Brazil			League	
1997	Cruzeiro	Série A		
1998	Cruzeiro	Série A		
1999	Internacional	Série A	4	0
2000	Cruzeiro	Série A		
Portugal			League	
2001/02	Boavista	Portuguese Liga	23	7
2002/03	Boavista	Portuguese Liga	17	0
2003/04	Nacional	Portuguese Liga	27	2
2004/05	Nacional	Portuguese Liga	26	5
2005/06	Nacional	Portuguese Liga	31	11
Brazil			League	
2006	Corinthians Alagoano		0	0
Japan			League	
2006	Shimizu S-Pulse	J1 League	7	0
2007	Shimizu S-Pulse	J1 League	0	0
Country	Brazil		4	0
Country	Portugal		124	25
Country	Japan		7	0
Total			135	25
