= Przemysław Łudziński =

Polish footballer

Personal information
- Full name: Przemysław Łudziński
- Date of birth: 3 February 1983 (age 43)
- Place of birth: Więcbork, Poland
- Height: 1.80 m (5 ft 11 in)
- Position: Striker

Senior career*
Years	Team	Apps	(Gls)
- Rossa Rosnowo
2000–2005	Amica Wronki	5	(1)
2005–2007	Ruch Chorzów	54	(10)
2007–2010	Śląsk Wrocław	36	(15)
2009	→ Piast Gliwice (loan)	11	(1)
2011	GKP Gorzów Wlkp.	6	(0)
2011–2012	Znicz Pruszków	19	(1)
2013	Świt Piotrowo		
2014	Noteć Rosko		
2015	Warta Sieraków		
2016	Błękitni Wronki		
2020	Leśnik Manowo	1	(0)
2022–2023	Krajna Sępólno Krajeńskie	11	(0)
- * Club domestic league appearances and goals

Przemysław Łudziński (born 3 February 1983) is a Polish former professional footballer who played as a striker.

== Career ==
=== Club ===
He is trainee of Rossa Rosnowo. Then he moved to Amica Wronki. Next he played for Ruch Chorzów. In the summer 2007, he moved to Śląsk Wrocław on loan and half year later was sold to this club from Ruch Chorzów. In 2009, he also plays for Piast Gliwice on loan.

In July 2011, he joined Znicz Pruszków.

== Honours ==
Ruch Chorzów

- II liga: 2006–07

Śląsk Wrocław

- Ekstraklasa Cup: 2008–09
