= Marco Manso =

Brazilian footballer (born 1973)

Personal information
- Full name: Marco Antônio Manso
- Date of birth: 9 October 1973 (age 53)
- Place of birth: Viçosa do Ceará, Brazil
- Height: 1.87 m (6 ft 2 in)
- Position: Midfielder

Senior career*
Years	Team	Apps	(Gls)
–1992	Ferroviário (CE)		
1993	Ponte Preta		
1995	Bragantino		
1996–1997	Hajer Club		
1997–1998	Naxxar Lions		
1999–2003	MYPA	116	(29)
2004	Kedah		
2005–2007	MYPA	37	(7)

Managerial career
- 2015–2019: FC ŠTK 1914 Šamorín (director)
- 2019–2020: Roeselare (CEO)
- * Club domestic league appearances and goals

Marco Antônio Manso (born 9 October 1973) is a Brazilian former football player and manager.

== Playing career ==
In 1996, Manso signed for Saudi Arabian side Hajer Club. In 1997, he signed for Naxxar Lions in Malta. Before the 1999 season, Manso signed for MYPA in Finland, where he made 116 league appearances and scored 29 goals. Before the 2004 season, he signed for Malaysian team Kedah. Before the 2005 season, Manso returned to MYPA in Finland, helping them win their only league title.

== Managerial career ==
In 2015, Manso was appointed director of Slovak third tier outfit FC ŠTK 1914 Šamorín. In 2019, he was appointed CEO of Roeselare in the Belgian second tier.
