= Mateusz Bartczak =

Polish footballer

Personal information
- Full name: Mateusz Bartczak
- Date of birth: 15 August 1979 (age 47)
- Place of birth: Legnica, Poland
- Height: 1.82 m (6 ft 0 in)
- Position: Midfielder

Youth career
- 1994–1998: Miedź Legnica

Senior career*
Years	Team	Apps	(Gls)
1998–2003	Polonia Warsaw	114	(6)
2003–2006	Amica Wronki	64	(3)
2006–2010	Zagłębie Lubin	97	(8)
2011–2012	Cracovia	33	(0)
2012–2013	KS Polkowice	19	(1)
2013–2014	Chojnowianka Chojnów		
- * Club domestic league appearances and goals

Mateusz Bartczak (born 15 August 1979) is a Polish former professional footballer who played as a midfielder.

== Career ==
=== Club ===
He joined Polonia at the start of 1998, and made his debut in April 1998 against GKS Katowice. He played for Polonia during their championship-winning 1999–2000 season.

He joined Amica Wronki in early 2003.

In February 2011, he moved to Cracovia on a six-month contract.

== Honours ==
Polonia Warsaw

- Ekstraklasa: 1999–2000
- Polish Cup: 2000–01
- Polish League Cup: 1999–2000

Zagłębie Lubin

- Ekstraklasa: 2006–07
- Polish Super Cup: 2007

Individual

- Ekstraklasa Player of the Month: November 2010
