= Didié Angan =

Ivorian footballer (born 1974)

Personal information
- Date of birth: 27 December 1974 (age 51)
- Place of birth: Anyama, Ivory Coast
- Height: 1.84 m (6 ft 0 in)
- Position: Defender

Youth career
- Paris Saint-Germain

Senior career*
| Years | Team | Apps | (Gls) |
| 1994–1995 | Paris Saint-Germain | 0 | (0) |
| 1995–1997 | Stade Briochin | 47 | (0) |
| 1997–2002 | Nice | 116 | (6) |
| 2002–2003 | Sturm Graz | 10 | (0) |
| 2003–2005 | Hellas Verona | 28 | (0) |
| 2005–2006 | Grosseto | 8 | (0) |
| 2006–2007 | Catanzaro | 8 | (0) |
| 2007–2009 | AC Ajaccio | 21 | (0) |

International career
| 1998–2001 | Ivory Coast | | |
- * Club domestic league appearances and goals as of 7 April 2008

Didié Angan (born 27 December 1974 at Anyama) is a former Ivorian footballer who played as a defender.

== Club career ==
In May 1995, while playing for the Paris Saint-Germain reserve team, he tried out for Stade Lavallois with a view to a possible loan. Denis Troch, the coach at Stade Lavallois, was pleased with the results, but the experiment went nowhere. Angan previously played for Stade Briochin and OGC Nice in Ligue 2. (Note: Didié Angan – French league stats at LFP – also available in French (archived))

== International career ==
He represented Ivory Coast in the 1998 and 2000 African Cup of Nations.
