= Mustafa Özkan =

Turkish footballer (born 1975)

Personal information
- Date of birth: 21 February 1975 (age 51)
- Place of birth: Forchheim, West Germany
- Height: 1.89 m (6 ft 2 in)
- Position: Forward

Youth career
- 1. FC Nürnberg

Senior career*
Years	Team	Apps	(Gls)
1995–1997	Beşiktaş	42	(9)
1997–1999	Kocaelispor	21	(4)
1998	→ İstanbulspor (loan)	10	(0)
1999	Grasshoppers		
1999–2001	Stuttgarter Kickers	20	(2)
2001–2002	Göztepe	36	(12)
2002–2003	Denizlispor	29	(8)
2003–2005	Gençlerbirliği	68	(18)
2005–2007	Malatyaspor	60	(10)
2007–2008	Ankaragücü	11	(0)
2008–2009	Antalyaspor	18	(3)
2009–2010	Diyarbakırspor	1	(0)
2010	→ Rizespor (loan)	4	(0)
2010	Rizespor		

International career
2003	Turkey	1	(0)
- * Club domestic league appearances and goals

Mustafa Özkan (born 21 February 1975) is a former professional footballer who played as a forward.

Özkan played two seasons for Stuttgarter Kickers in the 2. Bundesliga, appearing in 20 league matches. He also played for several clubs in Turkey, including Beşiktaş, Gençlerbirliği, Malatyaspor and MKE Ankaragücü.

Born in Germany, he made one appearance for the Turkey national team in a friendly against Ukraine on 12 February 2003.
