= 2002–03 Málaga CF season =

Málaga CF
2002–03 season
- Manager: Joaquín Peiró
- La Liga: 13th
- Copa del Rey: Round of 32
- UEFA Intertoto Cup: Finals
- UEFA Cup: Quarter-finals

During the 2002–03 in Spanish football season, Málaga competed in La Liga.

== Season summary ==
Málaga slipped to 13th in the final table, but won the Intertoto Cup and reached the quarter-finals of the UEFA Cup. Manager Joaquín Peiró left at the end of the season.

== First-team squad ==
Squad at end of season

Note: Flags indicate national team as defined under FIFA eligibility rules; some limited exceptions apply. Players may hold more than one non-FIFA nationality.

No.	Pos.	Nation	Player
1	GK	ESP	Rafa
2	DF	ESP	Roberto Rojas
3	DF	ESP	Francis Bravo
4	DF	POR	Litos
5	DF	ESP	Mikel Roteta
6	DF	ESP	Raúl Iznata
7	FW	PAN	Julio Dely Valdés
9	FW	URU	Darío Silva
11	MF	NED	Kiki Musampa
12	DF	ESP	Vicente Valcarce
13	GK	ESP	Pedro Contreras
14	MF	URU	Marcelo Romero
15	MF	ESP	Manu Sánchez

No.	Pos.	Nation	Player
17	MF	ESP	Miguel Ángel
18	MF	CRO	Ivan Leko
19	DF	ESP	Fernando Sanz
20	DF	ESP	Gerardo
21	DF	ESP	Josemi
23	MF	ESP	Sandro
24	FW	ESP	Manuel Canabal
25	GK	ESP	Francesc Arnau
26	MF	ESP	Juanito
27	DF	ESP	Nacho
28	FW	ESP	Koke
29	DF	ESP	Alexis
30	MF	ESP	Juan Rodríguez

=== Left club during season ===
Note: Flags indicate national team as defined under FIFA eligibility rules; some limited exceptions apply. Players may hold more than one non-FIFA nationality.

No. / Pos. / Nation / Player; 8 / MF / ESP / Francisco Manuel Ruano (on loan to Córdoba)	No. / Pos. / Nation / Player; 10 / FW / POR / Edgar (on loan to Getafe)

== Results ==
=== UEFA Cup ===
==== First round ====
19 September 2002	Željezničar (Bosnia and Herzegovina)	0–0	(Spain) Málaga	Koševo Stadium, Sarajevo
20:30		Report		Referee: Stefan Meissner (Austria)

3 October 2002	Málaga (Spain)	1–0	(Bosnia and Herzegovina) Željezničar	La Rosaleda Stadium, Málaga
21:30	Dely Valdés 7' (pen.)	Report		Referee: Ladislav Gádoši (Slovakia)

==== Second round ====
24 October 2002	Málaga (Spain)	2–1	(Poland) Amica Wronki	La Rosaleda Stadium, Málaga
21:30	Romero 39'; Dely Valdés 69'	Report	Jikia 2'	Referee: Alexandru Tudor (Romania)

7 November 2002	Amica Wronki (Poland)	1–2	(Spain) Málaga	Stadion Amica, Wronki
18:00	Gesior 16'	Report	Silva 20'; Musampa 72'	Referee: Bernhard Brugger (Austria)

Málaga won 4–2 on aggregate.

==== Third round ====
28 November 2002	Málaga (Spain)	0–0	(England) Leeds United	La Rosaleda Stadium, Málaga
22:00		Report		Referee: Alfredo Trentalange (Italy)

12 December 2002	Leeds United (England)	1–2	(Spain) Málaga	Elland Road, Leeds
21:00	Bakke 22'	Report	Dely Valdés 13', 79'	Referee: Massimo Busacca (Switzerland)

Málaga won 2–1 on aggregate.

==== Fourth round ====
20 February 2003	Málaga (Spain)	0–0	(Greece) AEK Athens	La Rosaleda Stadium, Málaga
21:30		Report		Referee: Željko Širić (Croatia)

27 February 2003	AEK Athens (Greece)	0–1	(Spain) Málaga	Nikos Goumas Stadium, Athens
19:00		Report	Manu Sánchez 26'	Referee: Rob Styles (England)

Málaga won 1–0 on aggregate.

==== Quarter-finals ====
13 March 2003	Málaga (Spain)	1–0	(Portugal) Boavista	La Rosaleda Stadium, Málaga
21:30	Dely Valdés 17'	Report		Referee: Pierluigi Collina (Italy)

20 March 2003	Boavista (Portugal)	1–0 (a.e.t.) (4–1 p)	(Spain) Málaga	Estádio do Bessa, Porto
22:00	Luiz Cláudio 83'	Report		Referee: Gilles Veissière (France)
	Penalties
	Alexandre (penalty scored); Luiz Cláudio (penalty scored); Silva (penalty scored); Ricardo (penalty scored)		(penalty missed) Bravo; (penalty scored) Miguel Ángel; (penalty missed) Leko

1–1 on aggregate. Boavista won 4–1 on penalties.
