= 2001–02 Málaga CF season =

Málaga CF
2001–02 season
- President: Serafín Roldán
- Head coach: Joaquín Peiró
- Stadium: La Rosaleda
- La Liga: 10th
- Copa del Rey: Round of 32
- Top goalscorer: League: Julio Dely Valdés (11); All: Julio Dely Valdés (11)
- Average home league attendance: 16,000

The 2001–02 season was the 54th season in the history of Málaga CF and the club's third consecutive season in the top flight of Spanish football. In addition to the domestic league, Málaga participated in this season's editions of the Copa del Rey. The team finished the season in 10th place and as a result qualified for the UEFA Intertoto Cup.

== Squad ==
Note: Flags indicate national team as defined under FIFA eligibility rules; some limited exceptions apply. Players may hold more than one non-FIFA nationality.

No.	Pos.	Nation	Player
1	GK	ESP	Rafa
2	DF	ESP	Roberto Rojas
3	DF	ESP	Bravo
4	DF	POR	Litos
5	DF	ESP	Mikel Roteta
6	MF	ESP	Manu Sánchez
7	FW	PAN	Julio Dely Valdés
8	MF	ESP	Manel Ruano
9	FW	URU	Darío Silva
10	FW	POR	Edgar Pacheco
11	MF	NED	Kiki Musampa
12	DF	ESP	Vicente Valcarce
13	GK	ESP	Pedro Contreras
14	MF	URU	Marcelo Romero

No.	Pos.	Nation	Player
15	MF	ESP	Gerardo
16	FW	ARG	Pablo Calandria
17	MF	ESP	Miguel Ángel
18	MF	CRO	Ivan Leko
19	DF	ESP	Fernando Sanz
20	MF	ARG	Ariel Zárate
21	DF	ESP	Txomin Larrainzar
22	MF	POR	Duda
23	MF	ESP	Sandro
24	FW	ESP	Manuel Canabal
25	GK	ESP	Francesc Arnau
27	DF	ESP	Josemi
28	MF	ESP	Juanma
29	MF	ESP	Juanito

== Competitions ==
=== Overview ===
Competition	First match	Last match	Starting round	Final position	Record							
Competition	First match	Last match	Starting round	Final position	Pld	W	D	L	GF	GA	GD	Win %
La Liga	26 August 2001	11 May 2002	Matchday 1	10th	38	13	14	11	44	44	+0	34.21
Copa del Rey	31 October 2001	6 December 2001	Round of 64	Round of 32	2	1	1	0	3	2	+1	50.00
Total					40	14	15	11	47	46	+1	35.00

Source: BDFutbol

=== La Liga ===
==== League table ====
Pos	Team	Pld	W	D	L	GF	GA	GD	Pts	Qualification or relegation
8	Sevilla	38	14	11	13	51	40	+11	53 (Note: SEV: 7 pts → SEV 3–3 ATH; ATH: 7 pts → ATH 0–1 SEV; MLG: 3 pts)	
9	Athletic Bilbao	38	14	11	13	54	66	−12	53	
10	Málaga	38	13	14	11	44	44	0	53	Qualification for the Intertoto Cup third round
11	Rayo Vallecano	38	13	10	15	46	52	−6	49	
12	Valladolid	38	13	9	16	45	58	−13	48	

Source: LFP
Rules for classification: 1st points; 2nd head-to-head points; 3rd head-to-head goal difference; 4th head-to-head goals scored; 5th goal difference; 6th number of goals scored; 7th Fair-play points

==== Results summary ====
Overall								Home						Away					
Pld	W	D	L	GF	GA	GD	Pts	W	D	L	GF	GA	GD	W	D	L	GF	GA	GD
38	13	14	11	44	44	0	53	8	7	4	24	20	+4	5	7	7	20	24	−4

==== Results by round ====
Round	1	2	3	4	5	6	7	8	9	10	11	12	13	14	15	16	17	18	19	20	21	22	23	24	25	26	27	28	29	30	31	32	33	34	35	36	37	38
Ground	H	A	H	A	H	A	H	A	H	A	H	A	H	A	H	A	H	A	H	A	H	A	H	A	H	A	H	A	H	A	H	A	H	A	H	A	H	A
Result	W	D	L	D	L	L	D	W	D	W	L	L	W	L	W	D	D	L	W	D	D	D	D	L	W	D	W	L	W	W	D	W	W	L	D	D	L	W
Position	6	5	10	10	13	15	17	17	16	12	16	17	14	16	14	13	12	15	12	12	12	13	13	16	13	14	12	12	12	9	9	8	7	8	8	8	9	10

Source: La Liga
A = Away; H = Home; W = Win; D = Draw; L = Loss

==== Matches ====
26 August 2001 1	Málaga	3–2	Real Betis	Málaga
CEST (UTC+2)				Stadium: La Rosaleda; Referee: Ansuategui Roca

1 September 2001 2	Real Madrid	1–1	Málaga	Madrid
CEST (UTC+2)				Stadium: Santiago Bernabéu; Referee: Llonch Andreu

16 September 2001 3	Málaga	1–2	Valladolid	Málaga
CEST (UTC+2)				Stadium: La Rosaleda; Referee: Alberto Undiano Mallenco

22 September 2001 4	Las Palmas	0–0	Málaga	Las Palmas
CEST (UTC+2)				Stadium: Estadio Gran Canaria; Referee: Pino Zamorano

29 September 2001 5	Málaga	1–2	Athletic Bilbao	Málaga
CEST (UTC+2)				Stadium: La Rosaleda; Referee: Arturo Daudén Ibáñez

6 October 2001 6	Alavés	1–0	Málaga	Vitoria-Gasteiz
CEST (UTC+2)				Stadium: Mendizorrotza; Referee: Rodríguez Santiago

21 October 2001 7	Málaga	2–2	Celta Vigo	Málaga
CEST (UTC+2)				Stadium: La Rosaleda; Referee: Manuel Mejuto González

28 October 2001 8	Villarreal	1–2	Málaga	Villarreal
CEST (UTC+2)				Stadium: Estadio de la Cerámica; Referee: Pérez Lasa

3 November 2001 9	Málaga	1–1	Barcelona	Málaga
CEST (UTC+2)				Stadium: La Rosaleda; Referee: Fernández Marín

10 November 2001 10	Zaragoza	0–2	Málaga	Zaragoza
CEST (UTC+2)				Stadium: La Romareda; Referee: Muñiz Fernández

14 November 2001 11	Málaga	1–3	Sevilla	Málaga
CET (UTC+1)				Stadium: La Rosaleda

18 November 2001 12	Rayo Vallecano	3–0	Málaga	Zaragoza
CET (UTC+1)				Stadium: Vallecas

21 November 2001 13	Málaga	2–1	Osasuna	Málaga
CET (UTC+1)				Stadium: La Rosaleda

25 November 2001 14	Tenerife	1–0	Málaga	Santa Cruz de Tenerife
CET (UTC+1)				Stadium: Heliodoro Rodríguez López

2 December 2001 15	Málaga	1–0	Real Sociedad	Málaga
CET (UTC+1)				Stadium: La Rosaleda

9 December 2001 16	Mallorca	1–1	Málaga	Palma
CET (UTC+1)				Stadium: Estadi de Son Moix

16 December 2001 17	Málaga	1–1	Deportivo La Coruña	Málaga
CET (UTC+1)				Stadium: La Rosaleda

22 December 2001 18	Valencia	2–1	Málaga	Valencia
CET (UTC+1)				Stadium: Mestalla

6 January 2002 19	Málaga	2–0	Espanyol	Málaga
CET (UTC+1)				Stadium: La Rosaleda

13 January 2002 20	Real Betis	1–1	Málaga	Seville
CET (UTC+1)				Stadium: Benito Villamarín

19 January 2002 21	Málaga	1–1	Real Madrid	Málaga
CET (UTC+1)				Stadium: La Rosaleda

27 January 2002 22	Valladolid	0–0	Málaga	Valladolid
CET (UTC+1)				Stadium: José Zorrilla

3 February 2002 23	Málaga	1–1	Las Palmas	Málaga
CET (UTC+1)				Stadium: La Rosaleda

6 February 2002 24	Athletic Bilbao	3–2	Málaga	Bilbao
CET (UTC+1)				Stadium: San Mamés

10 February 2002 25	Málaga	1–0	Alavés	Málaga
CET (UTC+1)				Stadium: La Rosaleda

17 February 2002 26	Celta Vigo	0–0	Málaga	Vigo
CET (UTC+1)				Stadium: Balaídos

24 February 2002 27	Málaga	2–1	Villarreal	Málaga
CET (UTC+1)				Stadium: La Rosaleda

3 March 2002 28	Barcelona	5–1	Málaga	Barcelona
CET (UTC+1)				Stadium: Camp Nou

10 March 2002 29	Málaga	2–1	Zaragoza	Málaga
CET (UTC+1)				Stadium: La Rosaleda

17 March 2002 30	Sevilla	0–2	Málaga	Seville
CET (UTC+1)				Stadium: Ramón Sánchez Pizjuán

23 March 2002 31	Málaga	0–0	Rayo Vallecano	Málaga
CET (UTC+1)				Stadium: La Rosaleda

31 March 2002 32	Osasuna	0–2	Málaga	Pamplona
CEST (UTC+2)				Stadium: El Sadar

7 April 2002 33	Málaga	2–0	Tenerife	Málaga
CEST (UTC+2)				Stadium: La Rosaleda

14 April 2002 34	Real Sociedad	2–1	Málaga	San Sebastián
CEST (UTC+2)				Stadium: Anoeta Stadium

21 April 2002 35	Málaga	0–0	Mallorca	Málaga
CEST (UTC+2)				Stadium: La Rosaleda

28 April 2002 36	Deportivo La Coruña	2–2	Málaga	A Coruña
CEST (UTC+2)				Stadium: Riazor

5 May 2002 37	Málaga	0–2	Valencia	Málaga
CEST (UTC+2)				Stadium: La Rosaleda

11 May 2002 38	Espanyol	1–2	Málaga	Barcelona
CEST (UTC+2)				Stadium: Estadi Olímpic Lluís Companys

=== Copa del Rey ===
31 October 2001 Round of 64	Cádiz	1–2	Málaga	Cádiz
21:00 CEST (UTC+2)	González 73'		Leko 41' (pen.); Roteta 76'	Stadium: Ramón de Carranza; Referee: Carlos Megía Dávila

6 December 2001 Round of 32	Ciudad de Murcia	1–1 (a.e.t.) (3–1 p)	Málaga	Murcia
21:30 CET (UTC+1)	Sánchez 46'		Roteta 75'	Stadium: La Condomina; Attendance: 4,000; Referee: Juan Fernández Marín
