= 1985–86 in Swiss football =

Football in Switzerland
- Season: 1985–86

Men's football
- Nationalliga A: Young Boys
- Nationalliga B: FC Locarno
- 1. Liga: Overall champions FC Olten; Group 1: ES FC Malley; Group 2: FC Bern; Group 3: SC Kriens; Group 4: FC Einsiedeln
- Swiss Cup: Sion

Women's football
- Swiss Women's Super League: DFC Bern
- Swiss Cup: SV Seebach Zürich

The following is a summary of the 1985–86 season of competitive football in Switzerland.

== Nationalliga A ==
=== League table ===
Pos	Team	Pld	W	D	L	GF	GA	GD	Pts	Qualification
1	Young Boys	30	18	8	4	72	28	+44	44	Swiss champions, qualified for 1986–87 European Cup and entered 1986 Intertoto Cup
2	Xamax	30	18	6	6	78	32	+46	42	Qualified for 1986–87 UEFA Cup
3	Luzern	30	16	9	5	56	39	+17	41	Qualified for 1986–87 UEFA Cup and entered 1986 Intertoto Cup
4	Zürich	30	15	9	6	64	43	+21	39	Entered 1986 Intertoto Cup
5	Grasshopper Club	30	15	8	7	64	32	+32	38	Entered 1986 Intertoto Cup
6	Lausanne-Sport	30	13	9	8	59	50	+9	35	Entered 1986 Intertoto Cup
7	Aarau	30	14	6	10	62	47	+15	34	
8	Sion	30	14	5	11	54	39	+15	33	Swiss Cup winners, qualified for 1986–87 Cup Winners' Cup
9	Servette	30	14	3	13	49	50	−1	31	
10	Basel	30	10	10	10	44	40	+4	30	
11	St. Gallen	30	12	6	12	48	46	+2	30	Entered 1986 Intertoto Cup
12	Wettingen	30	8	8	14	35	42	−7	24	
13	La Chaux-de-Fonds	30	3	12	15	24	61	−37	18	
14	Vevey-Sports	30	6	5	19	36	76	−40	17	
15	Grenchen	30	5	6	19	33	81	−48	16	Relegated to Nationalliga B
16	Baden	30	1	6	23	14	86	−72	8	Relegated to Nationalliga B

Source: rsssf.com
Rules for classification: 1) Points; 2) Goal difference; 3) Goals scored; 4) Head-to-head points; 5) Away goals scored; 6) Draw.

== Nationalliga B ==
=== Final league table ===
Pos	Team	Pld	W	D	L	GF	GA	GD	Pts	Qualification
1	FC Locarno	30	20	5	5	96	33	+63	45	NLB champions promoted to Nationalliga A
2	AC Bellinzona	30	18	9	3	58	24	+34	45	Promoted to Nationalliga A
3	Lugano	30	19	5	6	74	45	+29	43	
4	CS Chênois	30	15	11	4	71	44	+27	41	
5	FC Chiasso	30	13	9	8	48	41	+7	35	
6	FC Winterthur	30	12	7	11	57	56	+1	31	
7	FC Bulle	30	10	8	12	45	51	−6	28	
8	FC Biel-Bienne	30	9	9	12	45	55	−10	27	
9	FC Martigny-Sports	30	10	6	14	48	56	−8	26	
10	SC Zug	30	8	9	13	41	49	−8	25	
11	FC Renens	30	10	5	15	42	53	−11	25	
12	Etoile Carouge FC	30	8	9	13	34	47	−13	25	
13	FC Schaffhausen	30	8	9	13	36	51	−15	25	
14	FC Zug	30	7	9	14	39	51	−12	23	Relegated to 1. Liga
15	FC Laufen	30	6	8	16	42	70	−28	20	Relegated to 1. Liga
16	FC Le Locle	30	7	2	21	39	89	−50	16	Relegated to 1. Liga

Source: rsssf.com
Rules for classification: 1) Points; 2) Goal difference; 3) Goals scored; 4) Head-to-head points; 5) Away goals scored; 6) Draw.

== 1. Liga ==
=== Group 1 ===
Pos	Team	Pld	W	D	L	GF	GA	GD	Pts	Qualification or relegation
1	ES FC Malley	26	17	4	5	79	39	+40	38	Play-off to Nationalliga B
2	FC Fribourg	26	14	8	4	54	23	+31	36	Play-off to Nationalliga B
3	Grand-Lancy FC	26	12	7	7	61	55	+6	31	
4	Yverdon-Sport FC	26	11	9	6	52	49	+3	31	
5	FC Montreux-Sports	26	10	8	8	53	46	+7	28	
6	FC Monthey	26	11	5	10	46	43	+3	27	
7	FC Savièse	26	8	10	8	35	36	−1	26	
8	FC Saint-Jean GE	26	9	7	10	50	50	0	25	
9	FC Stade Lausanne	26	10	4	12	46	50	−4	24	
10	FC Leytron	26	10	4	12	37	56	−19	24	
11	FC Echallens	26	7	8	11	37	39	−2	22	
12	FC Vernier	26	8	6	12	42	46	−4	22	Play-out against relegation
13	FC Stade Payerne	26	6	7	13	37	63	−26	19	Relegation to 2. Liga Interregional
14	FC Stade Nyonnais	26	4	3	19	27	61	−34	11	Relegation to 2. Liga Interregional

Source: RSSSF
Rules for classification: 1) Points; 2) Goal difference within the league, but decider play-off for qualifiers.

=== Group 2 ===
Pos	Team	Pld	W	D	L	GF	GA	GD	Pts	Qualification or relegation
1	FC Bern	26	16	6	4	44	16	+28	38	Play-off to Nationalliga B
2	FC Lengnau	26	11	9	6	47	38	+9	31	Play-off to Nationalliga B
3	FC Colombier	26	10	10	6	45	36	+9	30	
4	BSC Old Boys	26	11	5	10	46	39	+7	27	
5	SC Burgdorf	26	8	11	7	30	36	−6	27	
6	FC Breitenbach	26	9	7	10	38	37	+1	25	
7	FC Köniz	26	8	9	9	43	45	−2	25	
8	FC Thun	26	7	10	9	39	40	−1	24	
9	FC Solothurn	26	6	12	8	28	34	−6	24	
10	SR Delémont	26	7	10	9	38	48	−10	24	
11	FC Nordstern Basel	26	8	7	11	44	43	+1	23	
12	FC Langenthal	26	7	9	10	41	42	−1	23	Decider for twelfth place
13	FC Concordia Basel	26	6	11	9	39	55	−16	23	Decider for twelfth place
14	SC Bümpliz 78	26	7	6	13	36	49	−13	20	Relegation to 2. Liga Interregional

Source: RSSSF
Rules for classification: 1) Points; 2) Goal difference within the league, but decider play-off for qualifiers.

==== Decider for twelfth place ====
The decider was played on 27 May at La Blancherie in Delémont.

Team 1	Score	Team 2
FC Langenthal	4–1	FC Concordia Basel

FC Langenthal win and continue in play-outs. FC Concordia Basel are relegated directly to 2. Liga Interregional.

=== Group 3 ===
Pos	Team	Pld	W	D	L	GF	GA	GD	Pts	Qualification or relegation
1	SC Kriens	26	16	5	5	68	36	+32	37	Play-off to Nationalliga B
2	FC Olten	26	16	5	5	57	31	+26	37	Play-off to Nationalliga B
3	FC Mendrisio	26	13	9	4	48	23	+25	35	
4	SC Buochs	26	12	8	6	43	35	+8	32	
5	FC Sursee	26	10	10	6	48	36	+12	30	
6	FC Ibach	26	9	7	10	41	48	−7	25	
7	FC Ascona	26	7	10	9	26	34	−8	24	
8	FC Suhr	26	8	8	10	30	43	−13	24	
9	FC Emmenbrücke	26	8	7	11	48	44	+4	23	
10	FC Klus-Balsthal	26	6	11	9	33	40	−7	23	
11	FC Altdorf (Uri)	26	7	9	10	41	49	−8	23	
12	FC Muri	26	7	9	10	36	52	−16	23	Play-out against relegation
13	SC Reiden	26	3	9	14	28	48	−20	15	Relegation to 2. Liga Interregional
14	FC Tresa/Monteggio	26	2	9	15	25	53	−28	13	Relegation to 2. Liga Interregional

Source: RSSSF
Rules for classification: 1) Points; 2) Goal difference within the league, but decider play-off for qualifiers.

=== Group 4 ===
Pos	Team	Pld	W	D	L	GF	GA	GD	Pts	Qualification or relegation
1	FC Einsiedeln	26	14	8	4	52	30	+22	36	Play-off to Nationalliga B
2	FC Red Star Zürich	26	14	7	5	54	23	+31	35	Play-off to Nationalliga B
3	FC Rorschach	26	13	6	7	44	32	+12	32	
4	FC Vaduz	26	11	6	9	46	38	+8	28	
5	FC Gossau	26	9	9	8	40	37	+3	27	
6	FC Stäfa	26	9	8	9	36	34	+2	26	
7	FC Rüti	26	8	9	9	33	33	0	25	
8	FC Dübendorf	26	8	7	11	38	39	−1	23	
9	FC Brüttisellen	26	10	3	13	38	49	−11	23	
10	FC Küsnacht	26	9	5	12	35	49	−14	23	
11	FC Altstätten (St. Gallen)	26	8	6	12	36	48	−12	22	
12	FC Frauenfeld	26	8	6	12	35	51	−16	22	Play-out against relegation
13	FC Balzers	26	8	5	13	39	47	−8	21	Relegation to 2. Liga Interregional
14	SC Brühl	26	7	7	12	31	47	−16	21	Relegation to 2. Liga Interregional

Source: RSSSF
Rules for classification: 1) Points; 2) Goal difference within the league, but decider play-off for qualifiers.

=== Promotion play-off ===
==== Qualification round ====
Team 1	Score	Team 2
SC Kriens	0–0	FC Red Star Zürich
FC Red Star Zürich	1–1	SC Kriens

SC Kriens win on away goals and continue to the finals.

Team 1	Score	Team 2
FC Lengnau	3–3	ES FC Malley
ES FC Malley	4–1	FC Lengnau

ES FC Malley win 7–4 on aggregate and continue to the finals.

Team 1	Score	Team 2
FC Fribourg	0–1	FC Einsiedeln
FC Einsiedeln	0–2	FC Fribourg

FC Fribourg win 2–1 on aggregate and continue to the finals.

Team 1	Score	Team 2
FC Bern	0–3	FC Olten
FC Olten	7–0	FC Bern

FC Olten win 10–0 on aggregate and continue to the finals.

==== Final round ====
Team 1	Score	Team 2
FC Olten	3–0	SC Kriens
SC Kriens	1–1	FC Olten

FC Olten win 4–1 on aggregate and are promoted to 1986–87 Nationalliga B.

Team 1	Score	Team 2
FC Fribourg	1–0	ES FC Malley
ES FC Malley	2–0	FC Fribourg

ES FC Malley win 2–1 on aggregate and are promoted to 1986–87 Nationalliga B.

==== Decider for third place ====
Team 1	Score	Team 2
FC Fribourg	2–1	SC Kriens
SC Kriens	3–1	FC Fribourg

SC Kriens win 4–3 on aggregate and are promoted to 1986–87 Nationalliga B. FC Fribourg remain in the division.

==== Final for championship ====
Team 1	Score	Team 2
FC Olten	4–3	ES FC Malley

FC Olten win and are declaied 1. Liga champions.

=== Relegation play-out ===
The four third-last placed teams from each group, competed a play-out against the ninth and last relegation spot.

==== First round ====
Team 1	Score	Team 2
FC Langenthal	0–0 a.e.t. 4–2 pen.	FC Vernier

FC Vernier continue to the final round.

Team 1	Score	Team 2
FC Muri	2–1	FC Frauenfeld

FC Frauenfeld continue to the final round.

==== Final round ====
Team 1	Score	Team 2
FC Frauenfeld	0–1	FC Vernier
FC Vernier	4–0	FC Frauenfeld

FC Vernier win 5–0 on aggregate. FC Frauenfeld are relegated as ninth and final team to the 2. Liga.

== Swiss Cup ==
=== Early rounds ===
The routes of the finalists to the final, played on

- Round 3: Malley-Sion 3:4 a.e.t. FC Lalden (4. Liga)-Servette 0:1.
- Round 4: Sion-Yverdon 6:1. Zug-Servette 1:2.
- Round 5: Sion-Vevey-Sports 4:2. Locarno-Servette 1:3.
- Quarter-finals: Sion-Wettingen 2:0. St. Gallen-Servette 0:0 a.e.t., 5:6 Pen.
- Semi-final: La Chaux-de-Fonds-Sion 0:2 a.e.t. Basel-Servette 3:4 (0:3, 3:3) a.e.t.

=== Final ===
19 May 1986

Sion	3–1	Servette
Balet 42'; Balet 52'; Bonvin 82'	Report	24' Schnyder

Stadion Wankdorf, Bern
Attendance: 39,000
Referee: Philippe Mercier (Pully)

Record revenue from advance sales (CHF 630,000 for 26,217 tickets). Symbolic kick-off by film actor Jean-Paul Belmondo. Referee Mercier was replaced by Georg Sandoz after an injury in the 85th minute.

== Swiss Clubs in Europe ==
- Servette as 1984–85 Nationalliga A champions: 1985–86 European Cup
- Aarau as 1984–85 Swiss Cup winners: 1985–86 Cup Winners' Cup and entered 1985 Intertoto Cup
- Xamax as league third placed team: 1985–86 UEFA Cup
- St. Gallen as fourth third placed team: 1985–86 UEFA Cup and entered 1985 Intertoto Cup
- Zürich: entered 1985 Intertoto Cup
- Young Boys: entered 1985 Intertoto Cup

=== Servette ===
==== European Cup ====
===== First round =====
18 September 1985 First leg	Linfield (Northern Ireland)	2–2	(Switzerland) Servette	Windsor Park, Belfast
	Anderson 1'; McKeown 89'	Report	Magnusson 18', 44'	Attendance: 2,898; Referee: Ib Nielsen (Denmark)

2 October 1985 Second leg	Servette (Switzerland)	2–1	(Northern Ireland) Linfield	Stade des Charmilles, Geneve
	Magnusson 43'; Jaccard 50'	Report	Anderson 22'	Attendance: 11,600; Referee: Bela Szabo (Hungary)

Servette won 4–3 on aggregate.

===== Second round =====
23 October 1985 First leg	Servette (Switzerland)	0–0	(Scotland) Aberdeen	Stade des Charmilles, Geneve
		Report		Attendance: 7,080; Referee: Zoran Petrović (Yugoslavia)

6 November 1985 Second leg	Aberdeen (Scotland)	1–0	(Switzerland) Servette	Pittodrie Stadium, Aberdeen
	McDougall 23'	Report		Attendance: 18,751; Referee: Augusto Lamo Castillo (Spain)

Aberdeen won 1–0 on aggregate.

=== Aarau ===
==== Cup Winners' Cup ====
===== First round =====
18 September 1985 First leg	Red Star Belgrade (Socialist Federal Republic of Yugoslavia)	2–0	(Switzerland) Aarau	Stadion Crvena zvezda, Belgrade
	Musemić 22'; Ǵurovski 72'	Report		Attendance: 30,172

2 October 1985 Second leg	Aarau (Switzerland)	2–2	(Socialist Federal Republic of Yugoslavia) Red Star Belgrade	Letzigrund, Zürich
	Meyer 7'; Zwahlen 37'	Report	Musemić 3'; Janković 17'	Attendance: 11,200

Red Star won 4–2 on aggregate.

==== Intertoto Cup ====
===== Group 11 =====
Matches

29 June 1985 Round 1	Chernomorets Burgas (Bulgaria)	4–1	(Switzerland) Aarau	Burgas
	Penev 9' (1:0); Penev 21' (2:0); Rusev 42' (3:0); Yovchev 66' (4:0)	FCA summary	73' (4:1) Metschl	Attendance: 2,000; Referee: (Bulgaria) Josifov

6 July 1985 Round 2	Aarau (Switzerland)	3–3	(Bulgaria) Chernomorets Burgas	Stadion Brügglifeld, Aarau
	Herberth 15' (1:1); Zwahlen 70' (2:2); Zwahlen 88' (3:2)	FCA summary	2' (0:1) Rusev; 27' (1:2) Kalushev; 89' (3:3) Rajkov	Attendance: 1,300; Referee: (Switzerland) Renzo Peduzzi (Roveredo)

13 July 1985 Round 3	Start (Norway)	2–0	(Switzerland) Aarau	Kristiansand Stadion, Kristiansand
	Håberg 2' (1:0); Håberg 62' (2:0)	FCA summary		Attendance: 700; Referee: (Norway) Presberg

20 July 1985 Round 4	Aarau (Switzerland)	4–2	(Norway) Start	Stadion Brügglifeld, Aarau
	Fregno 6' (1:1); Herberth 17' (2:1); Fregno 34' (3:2); Zwahlen 85' (4:2)	FCA summary	4' (0:1) Håberg; 29' (2:2) Klepp	Attendance: 1,600; Referee: (Switzerland) Philippe Mercier (Pully)

27 July 1985 Round 5	MTK (Hungary)	3–1	(Switzerland) Aarau	Hungária Körúti
	Kovács 29' (1:0); Fodor 45' (2:0); Bognár 85' (3:1)	FCA summary	63' (2:1) Bertelsen	Attendance: 3,000; Referee: (Hungary) Bela Szabo

3 August 1985 Round 6	Aarau (Switzerland)	1–1	(Hungary) MTK	Stadion Brügglifeld, Aarau
	Zwahlen 25' (1:0)	FCA summary	85' (1:1) Kajdy	Attendance: 1,300; Referee: (Switzerland) Willi Jaus (Feldmeilen)

Table

Pos	Team	Pld	W	D	L	GF	GA	GD	Pts	MTK	CHB	STA	AAR
1	(Hungary) MTK	6	4	2	0	17	7	+10	10	—	5–1	3–0	3–1
2	(Bulgaria) Chernomorets Burgas	6	2	1	3	11	12	−1	5	1–2	—	2–0	4–1
3	(Norway) Start	6	2	1	3	8	12	−4	5	3–3	1–0	—	2–0
4	(Switzerland) Aarau	6	1	2	3	10	15	−5	4	1–1	3–3	4–2	—

Source: mogiel.net
Rules for classification: 1) Points; 2) Goal difference; 3) Goals scored; 4) Head-to-head points; 5) Away goals scored; 6) Draw.

=== Xamax ===
==== UEFA Cup ====
===== First round =====
18 September 1985 First leg	Neuchâtel Xamax (Switzerland)	3–0	(Romania) Sportul Studențesc	Stade de la Maladière, Neuchâtel
	Jacobacci 11'; Ryf 27'; Stielike 65'	Report		Attendance: 14,800; Referee: Stoyan Ilijevski (Yugoslavia)

2 October 1985 Second leg	Sportul Studențesc (Romania)	4–4	(Switzerland) Neuchâtel Xamax	Stadionul Sportul, Bucharest
	Hagi 3', 41' (pen.), 84' (pen.); Sandu 23'	Report	Ryf 9'; Lüthi 20'; Givens 50'; Stielike 73'	Attendance: 7,500; Referee: Keith Hackett (England)

Neuchâtel Xamax won 7-4 on aggregate.

===== Second round =====
23 October 1985 First leg	Lokomotiv Sofia (Bulgaria)	1–1	(Switzerland) Neuchâtel Xamax	Lokomotiv Stadium, Sofia
	Bontchev 75'	Report	Perret 36'	Attendance: 8,000; Referee: Michel Vautrot (France)

6 November 1985 Second leg	Neuchâtel Xamax (Switzerland)	0–0	(Bulgaria) Lokomotiv Sofia	La Maladière, Neuchâtel
		Report		Attendance: 17,200; Referee: Gerald Losert (Austria)

1–1 on aggregate; Neuchâtel Xamax won on away goals.

===== Third round =====
27 November 1985 First leg	Dundee United (Scotland)	2–1	(Switzerland) Neuchâtel Xamax	Tannadice Park, Dundee
	Dodds 53'; Redford 75'	Report	Stielike 22'	Attendance: 10,633; Referee: Marcel Van Langenhove (Belgium)

11 December 1985 Second leg	Neuchâtel Xamax (Switzerland)	3–1 (a.e.t.)	(Scotland) Dundee United	La Maladière, Neuchâtel
	Nielsen 39', 109'; Hermann 55'	Report	Redford 17'	Attendance: 17,400; Referee: José Rosa dos Santos (Portugal)

Neuchâtel Xamax won 4–3 on aggregate.

==== Quarter-finals ====
5 March 1986 First leg	Real Madrid (Spain)	3–0	(Switzerland) Neuchâtel Xamax	Santiago Bernabéu, Madrid
	Sánchez 32'; Míchel 74'; Butragueño 85'	Report		Attendance: 75,000; Referee: Zoran Petrović

19 March 1986 Second leg	Neuchâtel Xamax (Switzerland)	2–0	(Spain) Real Madrid	La Maladière, Neuchâtel
	Stielike 11'; Jacobacci 90'	Report		Attendance: 25,500; Referee: Karl-Heinz Tritschler

Real Madrid won 3–2 on aggregate.

=== St. Gallen ===
==== UEFA Cup ====
===== First round =====
18 September 1985 First leg	Internazionale (Italy)	5–1	(Switzerland) St. Gallen	San Siro, Milan
	Altobelli 9'; Marangon 35'; Mandorlini 44'; Rummenigge 60', 86'	Report	Pellegrini 70'	Attendance: 35,457

2 October 1985 Second leg	St. Gallen (Switzerland)	0–0	(Italy) Internazionale	Espenmoos, St. Gallen
		Report		Attendance: 16,200

Internazionale won 5–1 on aggregate.

==== Intertoto Cup ====
===== Group 4 =====
Pos	Team	Pld	W	D	L	GF	GA	GD	Pts	AIK	VID	B05	STG
1	(Sweden) AIK	6	3	1	2	12	5	+7	7	—	3–0	2–1	0–1
2	(Hungary) Videoton	6	3	1	2	8	11	−3	7	1–0	—	1–0	1–1
3	(Czechoslovakia) Bohemians Prague	6	2	1	3	12	10	+2	5	1–1	5–2	—	4–2
4	(Switzerland) St. Gallen	6	2	1	3	9	15	−6	5	1–6	2–3	2–1	—

Source: mogiel.net
Rules for classification: 1) Points; 2) Goal difference; 3) Goals scored; 4) Head-to-head points; 5) Away goals scored; 6) Draw.

=== Zürich ===
==== Intertoto Cup ====
===== Group 6 =====
Matches

6 July 1985 Round 1	Zürich (Switzerland)	1–2	(Czechoslovakia) Sparta Prague	Tuggen
	Schneider 23' (1:0)	FCZ summary	77' (1:1) Griga; 84' (1:2) Griga	Attendance: 1,200; Referee: (Switzerland) Gottlieb Barmettler (Oberrieden, Lucerne)

13 July 1985 Round 2	Zürich (Switzerland)	1–3	(Denmark) Lyngby	Paul-Walser-Stiftung, Wohlen, Aargau
	Rufer 21' (1:2)	FCZ summary	17' (0:1) Pretzmann; 19' (0:2) Foss Nielsen; 70' (1:3) Pretzmann	Attendance: 616; Referee: (Switzerland) Bruno Galler (Kirchdorf, Bern)

17 July 1985 Round 3	Lyngby (Denmark)	1–0	(Switzerland) Zürich	Hvalsø
	Christensen 29' (1:0)	FCZ summary		Attendance: 1,775; Referee: (Denmark) Alex Jacobsen

July 1985 Round 4	Sparta Prague (Czechoslovakia)	1–1	(Switzerland) Zürich	Prague
	Ivan Hašek 53' (1:1)	FCZ summary	39' (0:1) Häusermann; (yellow card) Lüdi; (yellow card) Kühni; (yellow card) Schönenberger	Attendance: 5.000

27 July 1985 Round 5	Zürich (Switzerland)	2–1	(Poland) Lechia Gdańsk	Sportplatz Rüti, Uzwil
	Kraus 26' (1:1); Alliata 84' (2:1); Schönenberger (yellow card)	FCZ summary	Mozejko	Attendance: 900; Referee: (Switzerland) Kurt Röthlisberger (Suhr)

3 August 1985 Round 6	Lechia Gdańsk (Poland)	1–0	(Switzerland) Zürich	Gdańsk
	Oblewski 61' (1:0)	FCZ summary	(yellow card) Schönenberger	Attendance: 4,000; Referee: (Poland) Zalazko

Table

Pos	Team	Pld	W	D	L	GF	GA	GD	Pts	SPA	LYN	LGD	ZÜR
1	(Czechoslovakia) Sparta Prague	6	3	2	1	15	8	+7	8	—	6–2	0–0	1–1
2	(Denmark) Lyngby	6	4	0	2	12	12	0	8	1–4	—	4–1	1–0
3	(Poland) Lechia Gdańsk	6	2	1	3	6	9	−3	5	3–2	0–1	—	1–0
4	(Switzerland) Zürich	6	1	1	4	5	9	−4	3	1–2	1–3	2–1	—

Source: mogiel.net
Rules for classification: 1) Points; 2) Goal difference; 3) Goals scored; 4) Head-to-head points; 5) Away goals scored; 6) Draw.

=== Young Boys ===
==== Intertoto Cup ====
===== Group 7 =====
Pos	Team	Pld	W	D	L	GF	GA	GD	Pts	GÓR	ZAL	YB	AGF
1	(Poland) Górnik Zabrze	6	5	1	0	14	5	+9	11	—	1–1	3–0	2–1
2	(Hungary) Zalaegerszegi	6	2	2	2	11	10	+1	6	0–1	—	4–0	1–0
3	(Switzerland) Young Boys	6	2	0	4	12	17	−5	4	1–4	4–1	—	0–1
4	(Denmark) AGF	6	1	1	4	12	17	−5	3	2–3	4–4	4–7	—

Source: mogiel.net
Rules for classification: 1) Points; 2) Goal difference; 3) Goals scored; 4) Head-to-head points; 5) Away goals scored; 6) Draw.

== Sources ==
- Switzerland 1985–86 at RSSSF
- Cup finals at Fussball-Schweiz
- Results at RSSSF.com
- Intertoto history at Pawel Mogielnicki's Page
- Josef Zindel (2018). FC Basel 1893. Die ersten 125 Jahre (in German). Basel: Friedrich Reinhardt Verlag. ISBN 978-3-7245-2305-5.

Preceded by 1984–85	Seasons in Swiss football	Succeeded by 1986–87
