= 1985 Intertoto Cup =

Final positions
- Champions: Group winners Werder Bremen; Rot-Weiss Erfurt; IFK Göteborg; AIK; Wismut Aue; Sparta Prague; Górnik Zabrze; Maccabi Haifa; Baník Ostrava; Újpest; MTK

Tournament statistics
- Matches played: 132

In the 1985 Intertoto Cup no knock-out rounds were contested, and therefore no winner was declared.

== Group stage ==
48 clubs entered this years competition, the teams were divided into eleven groups with four teams each.

=== Group 1 ===
Pos	Team	Pld	W	D	L	GF	GA	GD	Pts	BRE	MAL	JEN	ANT
1	(West Germany) Werder Bremen	6	4	1	1	19	9	+10	9	—	2–1	3–0	5–1
2	(Sweden) Malmö	6	3	0	3	13	5	+8	6	5–1	—	2–0	5–0
3	(East Germany) Carl Zeiss Jena	6	2	2	2	6	8	−2	6	2–2	1–0	—	2–0
4	(Belgium) Royal Antwerp	6	1	1	4	3	19	−16	3	0–6	1–0	1–1	—

Source: mogiel.net
Rules for classification: 1) Points; 2) Goal difference; 3) Goals scored; 4) Head-to-head points; 5) Away goals scored; 6) Draw.

=== Group 2 ===
Pos	Team	Pld	W	D	L	GF	GA	GD	Pts	RWE	DÜS	LIÈ	TWE
1	(East Germany) Rot-Weiss Erfurt	6	3	2	1	16	5	+11	8	—	6–1	1–1	4–0
2	(West Germany) Fortuna Düsseldorf	6	3	1	2	11	14	−3	7	0–3	—	4–2	4–2
3	(Belgium) Standard Liège	6	1	3	2	8	10	−2	5	2–2	1–2	—	1–0
4	(Netherlands) Twente	6	1	2	3	4	10	−6	4	1–0	0–0	1–1	—

Source: mogiel.net
Rules for classification: 1) Points; 2) Goal difference; 3) Goals scored; 4) Head-to-head points; 5) Away goals scored; 6) Draw.
6 July 1985

FC Twente (Netherlands)	1–1	(Belgium) Standard Liège
Willy Carbo 86'	Report	Hans-Peter Lipka 41'

Diekman Stadion, Enschede
Attendance: 4,000
Referee: (Netherlands) Jan Manuel

9 July 1985

FC Twente (Netherlands)	0–0	(West Germany) Fortuna Düsseldorf
	Report

Diekman Stadion, Enschede
Attendance: 3,500
Referee: (Netherlands) Jan Hobé

16 July 1985

FC Rot-Weiß Erfurt (East Germany)	4–0	(Netherlands) FC Twente
Josef Vlay 36'; Jürgen Heun 40', 64'; Uwe Weidemann 86'	Report

Georgij-Dimitroff-Stadion, Erfurt
Attendance: 19,000
Referee: (East Germany) Klaus Peschel

21 July 1985

Standard Liège (Belgium)	1–0	(Netherlands) FC Twente
Hans-Peter Lipka 27'	Report

Stade Vélodrome de Rocourt, Liège
Attendance: 2,500

27 July 1985

Fortuna Düsseldorf (West Germany)	4–2	(Netherlands) FC Twente
Hans Holmqvist 32', 77'; Günter Thiele 44'; Andreas Keim 68'	Report	Manuel Sánchez Torres 65'; Bert-Jan Janssen 73'

Esprit Arena, Düsseldorf
Referee: (West Germany) Dieter Pauly

3 August 1985

FC Twente (Netherlands)	1–0	(East Germany) FC Rot-Weiß Erfurt
Bert-Jan Janssen 47'	Report

Diekman Stadion, Enschede
Attendance: 3,000
Referee: (Netherlands) Egbert Mulder

=== Group 3 ===
Pos	Team	Pld	W	D	L	GF	GA	GD	Pts	GÖT	LPO	ADM	BRØ
1	(Sweden) IFK Göteborg	6	3	1	2	9	5	+4	7	—	0–2	2–0	2–0
2	(Poland) Lech Poznań	6	3	0	3	15	14	+1	6	1–4	—	4–2	5–1
3	(Austria) Admira/Wacker Wien	6	3	0	3	13	13	0	6	2–1	5–3	—	3–0
4	(Denmark) Brøndby	6	2	1	3	6	11	−5	5	0–0	2–0	3–1	—

Source: mogiel.net
Rules for classification: 1) Points; 2) Goal difference; 3) Goals scored; 4) Head-to-head points; 5) Away goals scored; 6) Draw.

=== Group 4 ===
Pos	Team	Pld	W	D	L	GF	GA	GD	Pts	AIK	VID	B05	STG
1	(Sweden) AIK	6	3	1	2	12	5	+7	7	—	3–0	2–1	0–1
2	(Hungary) Videoton	6	3	1	2	8	11	−3	7	1–0	—	1–0	1–1
3	(Czechoslovakia) Bohemians Prague	6	2	1	3	12	10	+2	5	1–1	5–2	—	4–2
4	(Switzerland) St. Gallen	6	2	1	3	9	15	−6	5	1–6	2–3	2–1	—

Source: mogiel.net
Rules for classification: 1) Points; 2) Goal difference; 3) Goals scored; 4) Head-to-head points; 5) Away goals scored; 6) Draw.

=== Group 5 ===
Pos	Team	Pld	W	D	L	GF	GA	GD	Pts	AUE	SLP	EIN	VIK
1	(East Germany) Wismut Aue	6	3	1	2	9	8	+1	7	—	4–2	3–2	0–0
2	(Czechoslovakia) Slavia Prague	6	3	0	3	17	13	+4	6	2–0	—	4–0	5–1
3	(West Germany) Eintracht Braunschweig	6	3	0	3	15	14	+1	6	2–1	4–1	—	6–3
4	(Norway) Viking	6	2	1	3	10	16	−6	5	0–1	4–3	2–1	—

Source: mogiel.net
Rules for classification: 1) Points; 2) Goal difference; 3) Goals scored; 4) Head-to-head points; 5) Away goals scored; 6) Draw.

=== Group 6 ===
Table

Pos	Team	Pld	W	D	L	GF	GA	GD	Pts	SPA	LYN	LGD	ZÜR
1	(Czechoslovakia) Sparta Prague	6	3	2	1	15	8	+7	8	—	6–2	0–0	1–1
2	(Denmark) Lyngby	6	4	0	2	12	12	0	8	1–4	—	4–1	1–0
3	(Poland) Lechia Gdańsk	6	2	1	3	6	9	−3	5	3–2	0–1	—	1–0
4	(Switzerland) Zürich	6	1	1	4	5	9	−4	3	1–2	1–3	2–1	—

Source: mogiel.net
Rules for classification: 1) Points; 2) Goal difference; 3) Goals scored; 4) Head-to-head points; 5) Away goals scored; 6) Draw.

Matches

6 July 1985
Round 1

Zürich (Switzerland)	1–2	(Czechoslovakia) Sparta Prague
Schneider 23' (1:0)	FCZ summary	77' (1:1) Griga; 84' (1:2) Griga

Tuggen
Attendance: 1,200
Referee: (Switzerland) Gottlieb Barmettler (Oberrieden, Lucerne)

13 July 1985
Round 2

Zürich (Switzerland)	1–3	(Denmark) Lyngby
Rufer 21' (1:2)	FCZ summary	17' (0:1) Pretzmann; 19' (0:2) Foss Nielsen; 70' (1:3) Pretzmann

Paul-Walser-Stiftung, Wohlen, Aargau
Attendance: 616
Referee: (Switzerland) Bruno Galler (Kirchdorf, Bern)

17 July 1985
Round 3

Lyngby (Denmark)	1–0	(Switzerland) Zürich
Christensen 29' (1:0)	FCZ summary

Hvalsø
Attendance: 1,775
Referee: (Denmark) Alex Jacobsen

19 July 1985
Round 4

Sparta Prague (Czechoslovakia)	1–1	(Switzerland) Zürich
Ivan Hašek 53' (1:1)	FCZ summary	39' (0:1) Häusermann; (yellow card) Lüdi; (yellow card) Kühni; (yellow card) Schönenberger

Prague
Attendance: 5.000

27 July 1985
Round 5

Zürich (Switzerland)	2–1	(Poland) Lechia Gdańsk
Kraus 26' (1:1); Alliata 84' (2:1); Schönenberger (yellow card)	FCZ summary	Mozejko

Sportplatz Rüti, Uzwil
Attendance: 900
Referee: (Switzerland) Kurt Röthlisberger (Suhr)

3 August 1985
Round 6

Lechia Gdańsk (Poland)	1–0	(Switzerland) Zürich
Oblewski 61' (1:0)	FCZ summary	(yellow card) Schönenberger

Gdańsk
Attendance: 4,000
Referee: (Poland) Zalazko

=== Group 7 ===
Pos	Team	Pld	W	D	L	GF	GA	GD	Pts	GÓR	ZAL	YB	AGF
1	(Poland) Górnik Zabrze	6	5	1	0	14	5	+9	11	—	1–1	3–0	2–1
2	(Hungary) Zalaegerszegi	6	2	2	2	11	10	+1	6	0–1	—	4–0	1–0
3	(Switzerland) Young Boys	6	2	0	4	12	17	−5	4	1–4	4–1	—	0–1
4	(Denmark) AGF	6	1	1	4	12	17	−5	3	2–3	4–4	4–7	—

Source: mogiel.net
Rules for classification: 1) Points; 2) Goal difference; 3) Goals scored; 4) Head-to-head points; 5) Away goals scored; 6) Draw.

=== Group 8 ===
Pos	Team	Pld	W	D	L	GF	GA	GD	Pts	MHA	BIE	STU	BEI
1	(Israel) Maccabi Haifa	6	4	1	1	13	12	+1	9	—	2–1	1–1	3–0
2	(West Germany) Arminia Bielefeld	6	2	2	2	11	7	+4	6	8–2	—	0–2	1–0
3	(Austria) Sturm Graz	6	2	2	2	8	6	+2	6	1–2	0–0	—	4–1
4	(Israel) Beitar Jerusalem	6	1	1	4	5	12	−7	3	1–3	1–1	2–0	—

Source: mogiel.net
Rules for classification: 1) Points; 2) Goal difference; 3) Goals scored; 4) Head-to-head points; 5) Away goals scored; 6) Draw.

=== Group 9 ===
Pos	Team	Pld	W	D	L	GF	GA	GD	Pts	OST	VEJ	LSO	LIN
1	(Czechoslovakia) Baník Ostrava	6	3	2	1	11	4	+7	8	—	4–1	4–1	0–0
2	(Denmark) Vejle	6	3	2	1	9	8	+1	8	1–0	—	1–1	1–0
3	(Bulgaria) Lokomotiv Sofia	6	1	2	3	9	13	−4	4	0–2	1–3	—	4–1
4	(Austria) LASK	6	0	4	2	6	10	−4	4	1–1	2–2	2–2	—

Source: mogiel.net
Rules for classification: 1) Points; 2) Goal difference; 3) Goals scored; 4) Head-to-head points; 5) Away goals scored; 6) Draw.

=== Group 10 ===
Pos	Team	Pld	W	D	L	GF	GA	GD	Pts	ÚJP	VÅL	HAM	EIS
1	(Hungary) Újpest	6	4	1	1	11	5	+6	9	—	3–0	2–1	3–0
2	(Norway) Vålerenga	6	4	0	2	11	11	0	8	2–0	—	4–2	3–1
3	(Sweden) Hammarby	6	2	1	3	14	12	+2	5	2–2	4–0	—	4–0
4	(Austria) Eisenstadt	6	1	0	5	6	14	−8	2	0–1	1–2	4–1	—

Source: mogiel.net
Rules for classification: 1) Points; 2) Goal difference; 3) Goals scored; 4) Head-to-head points; 5) Away goals scored; 6) Draw.

=== Group 11 ===
Table

Pos	Team	Pld	W	D	L	GF	GA	GD	Pts	MTK	CHB	STA	AAR
1	(Hungary) MTK	6	4	2	0	17	7	+10	10	—	5–1	3–0	3–1
2	(Bulgaria) Chernomorets Burgas	6	2	1	3	11	12	−1	5	1–2	—	2–0	4–1
3	(Norway) Start	6	2	1	3	8	12	−4	5	3–3	1–0	—	2–0
4	(Switzerland) Aarau	6	1	2	3	10	15	−5	4	1–1	3–3	4–2	—

Source: mogiel.net
Rules for classification: 1) Points; 2) Goal difference; 3) Goals scored; 4) Head-to-head points; 5) Away goals scored; 6) Draw.

Matches

29 June 1985
Round 1

Chernomorets Burgas (Bulgaria)	4–1	(Switzerland) Aarau
Penev 9' (1:0); Penev 21' (2:0); Rusev 42' (3:0); Yovchev 66' (4:0)	FCA summary	73' (4:1) Metschl

Burgas
Attendance: 2,000
Referee: (Bulgaria) Josifov

6 July 1985
Round 2

Aarau (Switzerland)	3–3	(Bulgaria) Chernomorets Burgas
Herberth 15' (1:1); Zwahlen 70' (2:2); Zwahlen 88' (3:2)	FCA summary	2' (0:1) Rusev; 27' (1:2) Kalushev; 89' (3:3) Rajkov

Stadion Brügglifeld, Aarau
Attendance: 1,300
Referee: (Switzerland) Renzo Peduzzi (Roveredo)

13 July 1985
Round 3

Start (Norway)	2–0	(Switzerland) Aarau
Håberg 2' (1:0); Håberg 62' (2:0)	FCA summary

Kristiansand Stadion, Kristiansand
Attendance: 700
Referee: (Norway) Presberg

20 July 1985
Round 4

Aarau (Switzerland)	4–2	(Norway) Start
Fregno 6' (1:1); Herberth 17' (2:1); Fregno 34' (3:2); Zwahlen 85' (4:2)	FCA summary	4' (0:1) Håberg; 29' (2:2) Klepp

Stadion Brügglifeld, Aarau
Attendance: 1,600
Referee: (Switzerland) Philippe Mercier (Pully)

27 July 1985
Round 5

MTK (Hungary)	3–1	(Switzerland) Aarau
Kovács 29' (1:0); Fodor 45' (2:0); Bognár 85' (3:1)	FCA summary	63' (2:1) Bertelsen

Hungária Körúti
Attendance: 3,000
Referee: (Hungary) Bela Szabo

3 August 1985
Round 6

Aarau (Switzerland)	1–1	(Hungary) MTK
Zwahlen 25' (1:0)	FCA summary	85' (1:1) Kajdy

Stadion Brügglifeld, Aarau
Attendance: 1,300
Referee: (Switzerland) Willi Jaus (Feldmeilen)

== See also ==
- 1985–86 European Cup
- 1985–86 European Cup Winners' Cup
- 1985–86 UEFA Cup
