= 2015–16 Málaga CF season =

Málaga
2015–16 season
- Owner: Sheikh Abdullah Al Thani
- Manager: Javi Gracia
- Stadium: La Rosaleda
- La Liga: 8th
- Copa del Rey: Round of 32
- Top goalscorer: League: Charles (14 goals); All: Charles (14 goals)
Home colours	Away colours	Third colours

The 2017-18

season is the 84th season in Málaga CF's history and its 35th in the top-tier.

== Current squad ==
As of 3 May 2016

Note: Flags indicate national team as defined under FIFA eligibility rules; some limited exceptions apply. Players may hold more than one non-FIFA nationality.

No.	Pos.	Nation	Player
1	GK	CMR	Carlos Kameni
2	DF	ESP	Raúl Albentosa (on loan from Derby County)
3	DF	BRA	Weligton (vice-captain)
4	DF	ESP	Cifu (on loan from Elche)
5	MF	URU	Chory Castro
6	MF	ESP	Ignacio Camacho (3rd captain)
7	MF	ESP	Juan Carlos (on loan from Braga)
8	FW	NGA	Ikechukwu Uche (on loan from UANL)
9	FW	BRA	Charles
10	MF	POR	Ricardo Horta
11	MF	GHA	Christian Atsu (on loan from Chelsea)
12	MF	ARG	Fernando Tissone
13	GK	MEX	Guillermo Ochoa

No.	Pos.	Nation	Player
14	MF	ESP	Recio
15	DF	URU	Federico Ricca
16	MF	MAR	Hachim Mastour (on loan from Milan)
17	MF	POR	Duda (captain)
18	DF	VEN	Roberto Rosales
19	DF	CIV	Arthur Boka
20	FW	CRO	Duje Čop (on loan from Dinamo Zagreb)
21	DF	BLR	Egor Filipenko
23	DF	ESP	Miguel Torres
24	FW	PAR	Roque Santa Cruz (on loan from Cruz Azul)
27	GK	ESP	Aarón Escandell
28	MF	VEN	Juanpi
31	MF	ESP	Pablo Fornals
39	MF	ESP	Javi Ontiveros

=== Out on loan ===
Note: Flags indicate national team as defined under FIFA eligibility rules; some limited exceptions apply. Players may hold more than one non-FIFA nationality.

No.	Pos.	Nation	Player
—	GK	ESP	Pol Ballesté (on loan at Cádiz)
—	MF	POR	Fábio Espinho (on loan at Moreirense)
—	MF	ESP	Rafa de Vicente (on loan at Murcia)
—	MF	MAR	Adnane Tighadouini (on loan at Kayserispor)
—	FW	ARG	Ezequiel Rescaldani (on loan at Quilmes)

== Personnel ==
=== Current technical staff ===
Position	Staff
Head Coach	(Spain) Javi Gracia
Assistant Coach	(Uruguay) Marcelo Romero
Coach	(Spain) Ibán Andrés
Executive Vice President	(Qatar) Nasser Al Thani
General Manager	Vacant
Sporting Director	(Spain) Francesc Arnau
Fitness Trainer	(Spain) Juan Solla
Goalkeeper Coach	(Spain) Íñigo Arteaga Nieto
Technical Assistant	(Spain) Vicente Valcarce
Youth Advisor	(Spain) Manel Casanova Capdevila

Last updated: 10 June 2014
Source: Málaga CF

== Competitions ==
=== Overall ===
Competition	Started round	Final position / round	First match	Last match
La Liga	Matchday 1		21 August 2015	15 May 2016
Copa del Rey	Round of 32		3 December 2015	16 December 2015

Updated to match played 22 July 2015
Source: Competitions

=== Overview ===
Competition	Record							
Competition	Pld	W	D	L	GF	GA	GD	Win %
La Liga	38	13	12	13	39	34	+5	34.21
Copa del Rey	2	0	0	2	1	3	−2	0.00
Total	40	13	12	15	40	37	+3	32.50

Last updated: 15 May 2015
Source: Competitions

=== La Liga ===
==== League table ====
Pos	Team	Pld	W	D	L	GF	GA	GD	Pts	Qualification or relegation
6	Celta Vigo	38	17	9	12	51	59	−8	60	Qualification for the Europa League group stage (Note: Since the winners of the 2015–16 Copa del Rey, Barcelona, qualified for European competition based on league position, the spot awarded to the cup winners (Europa League group stage) was passed to the sixth-placed team and the spot awarded to the sixth-placed team (Europa League third qualifying round) was passed to the seventh-placed team.)
7	Sevilla	38	14	10	14	51	50	+1	52	Qualification for the Champions League group stage (Note: Sevilla qualified for the Champions League group stage by winning the 2015–16 UEFA Europa League. Based on their league position (7th), they would have received the spot above to enter the Europa League third qualifying round. This spot was vacated without replacement as per UEFA regulations.)
8	Málaga	38	12	12	14	38	35	+3	48 (Note: Málaga finished ahead of Real Sociedad on head-to-head record; Málaga 3–1 Real Sociedad, Real Sociedad 1–1 Málaga.)	
9	Real Sociedad	38	13	9	16	45	48	−3	48	
10	Real Betis	38	11	12	15	34	52	−18	45	

Source: La Liga, Soccerway
Rules for classification: 1) Points; 2) Head-to-head points; 3) Head-to-head goal difference; 4) Goal difference; 5) Goals scored; 6) Fair-play points; 7) Play-off.

==== Results summary ====
Overall								Home						Away					
Pld	W	D	L	GF	GA	GD	Pts	W	D	L	GF	GA	GD	W	D	L	GF	GA	GD
38	12	12	14	38	35	+3	48	8	6	5	26	15	+11	4	6	9	12	20	−8

Last updated: 15 May 2015.

==== Result round by round ====
Round	1	2	3	4	5	6	7	8	9	10	11	12	13	14	15	16	17	18	19	20	21	22	23	24	25	26	27	28	29	30	31	32	33	34	35	36	37	38
Ground	A	H	A	H	A	H	A	H	A	H	A	H	A	H	A	H	H	A	H	H	A	H	A	H	A	H	A	H	A	H	A	H	A	H	A	A	H	A
Result	D	L	D	L	L	D	W	L	W	L	L	L	D	D	W	W	W	W	D	L	L	W	W	L	D	D	L	D	W	W	D	D	L	D	L	W	L	W
Position	9	13	15	16	18	19	18	17	17	16	17	17	20	17	16	13	13	10	10	12	12	10	10	11	12	11	11	12	9	8	8	8	8	9	10	8	8	8

Updated to match(es) played on 15 May 2015. Source:
A = Away; H = Home; W = Win; D = Draw; L = Loss

==== Matches ====
Win Draw Loss

2 August 2015 1	Málaga	0–0	Sevilla	Málaga
20:30 (CEST) (UTC+2:00)	Darder (yellow card) 37'; Charles (yellow card) 42'; Boka (yellow card) 64'	Report	Rami (yellow card) 42'; Nzonzi (yellow card) 47' (yellow-red card) 69'; Mariano (yellow card) 76'; Beto	Stadium: La Rosaleda; Attendance: 23,641; Referee: Alfonso Álvarez Izquierdo

29 August 2015 2	Barcelona	1–0	Málaga	Barcelona
20:30 CEST (UTC+2:00)	Vermaelen 73'	Report	Recio (yellow card) 43'; Tissone (yellow card) 89'; Torres (yellow card) 90+1'	Stadium: Camp Nou; Attendance: 80,812; Referee: Santiago Jaime Latre (Aragon)

13 September 2015 3	Málaga	0–0	Eibar	Málaga
20:30 CEST (UTC+2:00)	Recio (yellow card) 67'; Angeleri (yellow card) 75'	Report	Escalante (yellow card) 49'; Eddy (yellow card) 74'; Keko (yellow card) 77'; Ramis (yellow card) 89'	Stadium: La Rosaleda; Attendance: 19,937; Referee: Alberto Undiano Mallenco (Navarre)

18 September 2015 4	Getafe	1–0	Málaga	Getafe
20:30 CEST (UTC+2:00)	Šćepović 2'; Velázquez (yellow card) 33'; Medrán (yellow card) 36'; Lago (yellow card) 43'; Lacen (yellow card) 81'; V. Rodríguez (yellow card) 90+4'	Report	Amrabat (yellow card) 34'; Tissone (yellow card) 89'	Stadium: Coliseum Alfonso Pérez; Attendance: 5,808; Referee: José María Sánchez Martínez

23 September 2015 5	Málaga	0–1	Villarreal	Málaga
22:00 CEST (UTC+2:00)	Recio (yellow card) 39'; Boka (yellow card) 61'	Report	Dos Santos (yellow card) 17'; Bailly (yellow card) 67'; Tissone 71' (o.g.); Suárez (yellow card) 79'	Stadium: La Rosaleda; Attendance: 18,767; Referee: Ricardo de Burgos Bengoetxea

26 September 2015 6	Real Madrid	0–0	Málaga	Madrid
18:15 CEST (UTC+2:00)	Varane (yellow card) 48'; Nacho (yellow card) 52'; Carvajal (yellow card) 89'; Ronaldo (yellow card) 90+4'	Report	Torres (yellow card) 27'; Recio (yellow card) 66'; Amrabat (red card) 77'; Kameni (yellow card) 83'; Juanpi (yellow card) 87'	Stadium: Santiago Bernabéu; Attendance: 75,361; Referee: José González González

3 October 2015 7	Málaga	3–1	Real Sociedad	Málaga
22:05 CEST (UTC+2:00)	Charles 4', 7', 89', (yellow card) 74'; Tissone (yellow card) 34' (yellow-red card) 71'; Recio (yellow card) 38'; Čop (yellow card) 72'	Report	Agirretxe 14'; Elustondo (yellow card) 45'; Vela (yellow card) 55'	Stadium: La Rosaleda; Attendance: 17,315; Referee: Carlos del Cerro Grande

17 October 2015 8	Valencia	3–0	Málaga	Valencia
22:00 CEST (UTC+2:00)	Charles 19' (o.g.); Gomes 33'; Fuego (yellow card) 62'; Mina (yellow card) 64'; Parejo (yellow card) 86', (goal) 88' (pen.)	Report	Angeleri (yellow card) 23'; Rosales (yellow card) 60'; Albentosa (yellow card) 88'	Stadium: Mestalla; Attendance: 35,819; Referee: Alejandro Hernández Hernández

24 October 2015 9	Málaga	2–0	Deportivo La Coruña	Málaga
22:05 CEST (UTC+2:00)	Tighadouini 62'; Juan Carlos 85'	Report	Mosquera (yellow card) 9'	Stadium: La Rosaleda; Attendance: 20,739; Referee: Carlos Velasco Carballo

1 November 2015 10	Sporting Gijón	1–0	Málaga	Gijón
18:15 CET (UTC+1:00)	Halilović 27'; Bernardo (yellow card) 45+1'	Report	Albentosa (yellow card) 38'; Recio (yellow card) 84'; Weligton (yellow card) 86'	Stadium: El Molinón; Attendance: 22,766; Referee: Antonio Mateu Lahoz

7 November 2015 11	Málaga	0–1	Real Betis	Málaga
22:05 CET (UTC+01:00)	Angeleri (yellow card) 48'; Charles (yellow card) 79'	Report	Bruno (yellow card) 31'; Cejudo (yellow card) 40'; Castro 64'; Piccini (yellow card) 78'; Varela (yellow card) 90'; Van Wolfswinkel (yellow card) 90+2'	Stadium: La Rosaleda; Attendance: 23,803; Referee: Eduardo Prieto Iglesias

21 November 2015 12	Espanyol	2–0	Málaga	Barcelona
20:30 CET (UTC+01:00)	Pérez 6', 20'; Diop (yellow card) 40'; Asensio (yellow card) 79'; Sánchez (yellow card) 90+1'	Report	Amrabat (yellow card) 15'; Duda (yellow card) 35'	Stadium: Cornellà-El Prat; Attendance: 12,461; Referee: Juan Martínez Munuera

28 November 2015 13	Málaga	2–2	Granada	Málaga
20:30 CET (UTC+01:00)	Tissone (yellow card) 37' (yellow-red card) 53'; Charles 45'; Rosales (yellow card) 51'; Fornals 57'; Torres (yellow card) 65'	Report	Lombán (yellow card) 27'; Lopes (yellow card) 56'; Ibáñez (yellow card) 65'; Márquez (yellow card) 75'; El-Arabi 83'; Rochina 86', (yellow card) 90+2'; Foulquier (yellow card) 90'	Stadium: La Rosaleda; Attendance: 22,931; Referee: Xavier Estrada Fernández

6 December 2015 14	Athletic Bilbao	0–0	Málaga	Bilbao
20:30 CET (UTC+01:00)	San José (red card) 19'; García (yellow card) 19'; Williams (yellow card) 19'	Report	Filipenko (yellow card) 12'; Amrabat (yellow card) 53'; Recio (yellow card) 77'	Stadium: San Mamés; Attendance: 41,835; Referee: Alfonso Álvarez Izquierdo

13 December 2015 15	Rayo Vallecano	1–2	Málaga	Madrid
12:00 CET (UTC+01:00)	Guerra 6', (yellow card) 90+5'	Report	Čop (yellow card) 31', (goal) 87'; Albentosa (yellow card) 37'; Charles 59'	Stadium: Campo de Vallecas; Attendance: 9,301; Referee: Carlos Clos Gómez

20 December 2015 16	Málaga	1–0	Atlético Madrid	Málaga
20:30 CET (UTC+01:00)	Albentosa (yellow card) 45'; Charles (yellow card) 45', (goal) 86'; Rosales (yellow card) 74'	Report	Filipe Luís (yellow card) 20'; Vietto (yellow card) 21'; Carrasco (yellow card) 45'; Gabi (yellow card) 51' (yellow-red card) 56'; Thomas (yellow card) 83'	Stadium: La Rosaleda; Attendance: 19,086; Referee: Antonio Mateu Lahoz

30 December 2015 17	Levante	0–1	Málaga	Valencia
16:00 CET (UTC+01:00)	Simão Mate (yellow card) 21'; Roger (yellow card) 35'; Jefferson (yellow card) 72'; Navarro (yellow card) 77'; P. López (yellow card) 87'; Deyverson (yellow card) 88'; Karabelas (yellow card) 90+2'	Report	Juan Carlos (yellow card) 1'; Camacho (yellow card) 44'; Duda 78', (yellow card) 84'; Amrabat (yellow card) 88'; Juanpi (yellow card) 89'	Stadium: Ciutat de València; Attendance: 12,094; Referee: Jesús Gil Manzano

2 January 2016 18	Málaga	2–0	Celta Vigo	Málaga
22:05 CET (UTC+01:00)	Charles 8', (yellow card) 88'; Albentosa 26'; Amrabat (yellow card) 30'; Recio (yellow card) 67'; Camacho (yellow card) 83'	Report	Cabral (yellow card) 25'; Hernández (yellow card) 38'; Blanco (red card) 64'	Stadium: La Rosaleda; Attendance: 17,635; Referee: Iñaki Vicandi Garrido

10 January 2016 19	Las Palmas	1–1	Málaga	Las Palmas
18:15 CET (UTC+01:00)	David Simón (yellow card) 10'; Mesa (yellow card) 43'; Tana 51'; Araujo (yellow card) 58'; Castellano (yellow card) 61'; Wakaso (yellow card) 84'	Report	Camacho (yellow card) 41'; Boka (yellow card) 56'; Santa Cruz 72'; Recio (yellow card) 75'; Duda (yellow card) 90+3'	Stadium: Gran Canaria; Attendance: 21,760; Referee: Ignacio Iglesias Villanueva

16 January 2016 20	Sevilla	2–1	Málaga	Seville
16:00 CET (UTC+01:00)	Coke (yellow card) 25'; Gameiro 40', 42'; Cristóforo (yellow card) 45+1'; Iborra (yellow card) 81' (yellow-red card) 83'	Report	Čop (yellow card) 29'; Camacho (yellow card) 57'; Charles 72'; Boka (yellow card) 90+1' (yellow-red card) 90+2'	Stadium: Ramón Sánchez Pizjuán; Attendance: 34,371; Referee: Javier Estrada Fernández

23 January 2016 21	Málaga	1–2	Barcelona	Málaga
16:00 CET (UTC+01:00)	Charles (yellow card) 25'; Juanpi 32'; Fornals (yellow card) 86'; Duda (yellow card) 90+4'	Report	Munir 2'; Vermaelen (yellow card) 44'; Messi 51', (yellow card) 65'; Turan (yellow card) 71'	Stadium: La Rosaleda; Attendance: 27,559; Referee: Carlos Clos Gómez

30 January 2016 22	Eibar	1–2	Málaga	Eibar
18:15 CET (UTC+01:00)	García (yellow card) 59'; Borja 90+4'	Report	Juanpi 45'; Charles (yellow card) 51'; Albentosa (yellow card) 65'; Torres (yellow card) 85'; Santa Cruz 90+1'	Stadium: Ipurua; Attendance: 5,252; Referee: Antonio Mateu Lahoz

5 February 2016 23	Málaga	3–0	Getafe	Málaga
20:30 CET (UTC+01:00)	Juanpi 9', (yellow card) 47'; Atsu 23'; Recio (yellow card) 29'; Charles 43'; Horta (yellow card) 82'	Report	Lacen (yellow card) 27'; J. Rodríguez (yellow card) 51'; Vergini (yellow card) 88'	Stadium: La Rosaleda; Attendance: 20,268; Referee: Juan Martínez Munuera

13 February 2016 24	Villarreal	1–0	Málaga	Villarreal
18:15	Soldado 18'; Trigueros (yellow card) 77'; Bakambu (yellow card) 90'	Report	Albentosa (yellow card) 34'	Stadium: El Madrigal; Attendance: 17,142; Referee: Iñaki Vicandi Garrido

21 February 2016 25	Málaga	1–1	Real Madrid	Málaga
16:00	Torres (yellow card) 2'; Weligton (yellow card) 35'; Juanpi (yellow card) 41'; Camacho (yellow card) 55'; Albentosa 66'; Kameni (yellow card) 90'	Report	Marcelo (yellow card) 24'; Ronaldo 33'; Modrić (yellow card) 71'	Stadium: La Rosaleda; Attendance: 28,290; Referee: Ignacio Iglesias Villanueva

28 February 2016 26	Real Sociedad	1–1	Málaga	San Sebastián
22:05 (UTC+1)	I. Martínez (yellow card) 19'; Berchiche (yellow card) 60'; Reyes (yellow card) 74'; Rulli (yellow card) 78'; Agirretxe 81'	Report	Recio (yellow card) 15'; Čop 56'; Ricca (yellow card) 58'; Charles (yellow card) 64'; Horta (yellow card) 70'; Weligton (yellow card) 80'	Stadium: Anoeta; Attendance: 12,783; Referee: Alberto Undiano Mallenco

2 March 2016 27	Málaga	1–2	Valencia	Málaga
20:00 CET (UTC+01:00)	Čop 14'; Juanpi (yellow card) 32'; Albentosa (yellow card) 62'; Torres (yellow card) 63'; Duda (yellow card) 64'; Recio (yellow card) 66'; Charles (yellow card) 77'	Report	Mustafi (yellow card) 19'; Gayà (yellow card) 30'; Cheryshev (yellow card) 35', (goal) 49'; Kameni 41' (o.g.); Feghouli (yellow card) 63'; Piatti (yellow card) 90+2'	Stadium: La Rosaleda; Attendance: 20,556; Referee: González González

6 March 2016 28	Deportivo	3–3	Málaga	A Coruña
22:05 CET (UTC+01:00)	Luis Alberto (yellow card) 21'; Borges 43'; Bergantiños (yellow card) 45+4'; Cartabia 69'; Mosquera (yellow card) 78'; Lucas 80'; Manu (yellow card) 90+4'	Report	Charles 29', (yellow card) 54'; Torres (yellow card) 41'; Camacho 63', (yellow card) 77' (yellow-red card) 90+3'; Arribas 89' (o.g.); Albentosa (yellow card) 90+4'	Stadium: Riazor; Attendance: 18,446; Referee: Carlos Velasco Carballo

11 March 2016 29	Málaga	1–0	Sporting Gijón	Málaga
20:30	Juanpi 25'; Rosales (yellow card) 69'	Report	López (yellow card) 18'; Álvarez (yellow card) 52'; Pérez (yellow card) 81'; Halilović (yellow card) 83'	Stadium: La Rosaleda; Attendance: 19,297; Referee: Ricardo de Burgos Bengoetxea

19 March 2016 30	Real Betis	0–1	Málaga	Seville
22:05 (UTC+1)	Pezzella (yellow card) 17'; Montoya (yellow card) 52'; Molina (yellow card) 90'	Report	Albentosa (yellow card) 27'; Castro (yellow card) 45'; Camacho 82'	Stadium: Benito Villamarín; Attendance: 31,371; Referee: Carlos Clos Gómez

3 April 2016 31	Málaga	1–1	Espanyol	Málaga
CET (UTC+01:00)	Charles (yellow card) 25'; Čop 45' (pen.); Camacho (yellow card) 62'	Report	Diop 11'; R. Duarte (yellow card) 25'; López (yellow card) 48'; Ó. Duarte (yellow card) 63'; Pérez (yellow card) 83'	Stadium: La Rosaleda; Attendance: 25,368; Referee: Juan Martínez Munuera

9 April 2016 32	Granada	0–0	Málaga	Granada
20:30 (UTC+1)	Success (yellow card) 89'	Report	Albentosa (yellow card) 20'; Ricca (yellow card) 49'; Rosales (yellow card) 90+2'	Stadium: Los Cármenes; Attendance: 18,979; Referee: Xavier Estrada Fernández

17 April 2016 33	Málaga	0–1	Athletic Bilbao	Málaga
12:00 CEST (UTC+02:00)	Recio (yellow card) 26'; Torres (yellow card) 33'; Weligton (yellow card) 60'	Report	Muniain (yellow card) 26'; García 53', (yellow card) 80'; Bóveda (yellow card) 57'; Gurpegui (yellow card) 66'; Rico (yellow card) 84'	Stadium: La Rosaleda; Attendance: 25,158; Referee: José María Sánchez Martínez (Murcia)

20 April 2016 34	Málaga	1–1	Rayo Vallecano	Málaga
20:45 (UTC+1)	Recio (yellow card) 66'; Ricca 90+1'	Report	Llorente (yellow card) 29'; Hernández (yellow card) 37'; Baena 62'; Trashorras (yellow card) 78'	Stadium: La Rosaleda; Attendance: 13,579; Referee: Alberto Undiano Mallenco

23 April 2016 35	Atlético Madrid	1–0	Málaga	Madrid
18:15 CET (UTC+01:00)	Giménez (yellow card) 54'; Torres (yellow card) 57'; Correa 62'; Filipe Luís (yellow card) 82'	Report	Charles (yellow card) 25'; Weligton (yellow card) 29'; Recio (yellow card) 90'	Stadium: Vicente Calderón; Attendance: 47,621; Referee: Antonio Mateu Lahoz

1 May 2016 36	Málaga	3–1	Levante	Málaga
20:30 CEST (UTC+02:00)	Čop 30', 89'; Albentosa (yellow card) 66'; Camacho (yellow card) 77'; Castro 90+3'	Report	Morales 42'; Víctor (yellow card) 62'; P. López (yellow card) 76'; José Mari (yellow card) 77'; Juanfran (yellow card) 82'	Stadium: La Rosaleda; Attendance: 17,654; Referee: Iñaki Vicandi Garrido

8 May 2016 37	Celta Vigo	1–0	Málaga	Vigo
17:00 CEST (UTC+02:00)	Nolito 31'	Report	Ricca (yellow card) 27'; Recio (yellow card) 45'	Stadium: Balaídos; Attendance: 20,040; Referee: Carlos del Cerro Grande

15 May 2016 38	Málaga	4–1	Las Palmas	Málaga
17:00 CEST (UTC+02:00)	Čop 26'; Charles 45+1', 86'; Torres (yellow card) 82'; Atsu 84'	Report	Willian José 31'; Lemos (yellow card) 45+1'	Stadium: La Rosaleda; Attendance: 17,913; Referee: Ricardo de Burgos Bengoetxea

== See also ==
2015–16 La Liga
