= Manuel Sánchez =

Manuel Sánchez or Sanchez may refer to:

- Manolo (footballer, born 1965) (Manuel Sánchez Delgado), Spanish footballer
- Manuel Sánchez (economist) (born 1950), Mexican economist
- Manuel Sánchez (tennis) (born 1991), Mexican tennis player
- Manuel Sánchez López (weightlifter) (born 1991), Spanish weightlifter
- Manuel Sánchez López (born 1988), Spanish footballer for AD Alcorcón
- Manuel Sánchez Torres (born 1960), Spanish footballer
- Manuel Sanchez, member of the American 2000s band, Flee the Seen
- Manu Sánchez (footballer, born 1979), Spanish footballer
- Manu Sánchez (footballer, born 1996), Spanish footballer
- Manu Sánchez (footballer, born 2000), Spanish footballer
