= Francis Bravo =

Francis Bravo may refer to:

- Francis Bravo (Nicaraguan footballer) (born 1985), full name Francis Walquiria Bravo Chavarría, Nicaraguan retired footballer
- Francis Bravo (Spanish footballer) (born 1974), full name Francisco Javier López Bravo, Spanish football manager and former player
