= Atlético Malagueño =

Association football club in Spain

- Full name: Club Atlético Malagueño
- Nicknames: Boquerones (Anchovies), Chanquetes
- Founded: 1990; 36 years ago as Sociedad Deportiva Malagueña
- Ground: Ciudad Deportiva Federación Malagueña de Fútbol; Málaga, Andalusia, Spain
- Capacity: 2,000
- President: Abdullah Al Thani
- Head coach: Francisco Bravo
- League: Tercera Federación – Group 9
- 2025–26: Segunda Federación – Group 4, 18th of 18 (relegated)
Home colours	Away colours	Third colours

Club Atlético Malagueño, shortened to Atlético Malagueño, (Spanish pronunciation: [aˈtletiko malaˈɣeɲo]) is a Spanish football team based in Málaga, in the autonomous community of Andalusia. Founded in 1990, it is the reserve team of Málaga CF, and currently plays in Tercera Federación – Group 9, holding home games at Ciudad Deportiva Federación Malagueña de Fútbol, which has a capacity of 1,300 spectators.

Reserve teams in the Spain play in the same football pyramid as their senior team rather than a separate league. However, reserve teams cannot play in the same division as their senior team. Therefore, the team is ineligible for promotion to the division in which the first team competes. Reserve teams are also no longer permitted to enter the Copa del Rey.

== History ==
The club was founded in 1990 as Sociedad Deportiva Malagueña, the reserve team of Club Atlético Malagueño. When the latter became Málaga CF in 1994, it changed its name to Málaga CF "B" the following year.

The B-team followed the first one as it moved up the different divisions and, at the end of 2002–03 was promoted to the second division where it would last three seasons, returning to the fourth level in 2007.

For the 2009–10 season onwards, Málaga B was renamed Atlético Malagueño.

=== Club names ===
As farm team

- Sociedad Deportiva Malagueña (1990–95)

As reserve team

- Málaga Club de Fútbol, S.A.D. "B" (1995–2009)
- Atlético Malagueño (2009–14)
- Club Atlético Malagueño (2014– )

== Season to season ==
- SD Malagueña

Season	Tier	Division	Place	Copa del Rey
1990–91	7	2ª Reg.		
1991–92	7	2ª Reg.	3rd	
1992–93	6	1ª Reg.	9th	
1993–94	5	Reg. Pref.	1st	
1994–95	5	Reg. Pref.	8th	

- As a reserve team

Season	Tier	Division	Place
1995–96	5	Reg. Pref.	1st
1996–97	4	3ª	11th
1997–98	4	3ª	6th
1998–99	4	3ª	1st
1999–2000	4	3ª	7th
2000–01	4	3ª	2nd
2001–02	4	3ª	2nd
2002–03	3	2ª B	2nd
2003–04	2	2ª	15th
2004–05	2	2ª	17th
2005–06	2	2ª	21st
2006–07	3	2ª B	20th
2007–08	4	3ª	15th
2008–09	4	3ª	4th
2009–10	4	3ª	6th
2010–11	4	3ª	4th
2011–12	4	3ª	5th
2012–13	4	3ª	4th
2013–14	4	3ª	3rd
2014–15	4	3ª	2nd

Season	Tier	Division	Place
2015–16	4	3ª	2nd
2016–17	4	3ª	1st
2017–18	4	3ª	1st
2018–19	3	2ª B	19th
2019–20	4	3ª	9th
2020–21	4	3ª	5th / 1st
2021–22	5	3ª RFEF	5th
2022–23	5	3ª Fed.	5th
2023–24	5	3ª Fed.	3rd
2024–25	5	3ª Fed.	1st
2025–26	4	2ª Fed.	18th
2026–27	5	3ª Fed.	

- 3 seasons in Segunda División
- 3 seasons in Segunda División B
- 1 season in Segunda Federación
- 19 seasons in Tercera División
- 5 seasons in Tercera Federación/Tercera División RFEF

== Honours ==
- Tercera División
  - Champions (3): 1998–99, 2016–17, 2017–18

== Current squad ==
As of 20 September 2026

Note: Flags indicate national team as defined under FIFA eligibility rules; some limited exceptions apply. Players may hold more than one non-FIFA nationality.

No.	Pos.	Nation	Player
1	GK	ESP	Álex Mateos
2	DF	ESP	Alberto Jiménez
5	DF	ESP	Miguel Santaella
6	MF	ESP	Cristóbal Cantero
7	FW	ESP	Gorka Perea
8	MF	ESP	Marcos López
11	DF	ESP	Óscar González
15	DF	ESP	Salva Ramos
16	FW	ESP	José María Arévalo
17	FW	ESP	Juani
18	MF	NGR	Joseph Otu
19	FW	ESP	Fran Maldonado
20	FW	MAR	Houssam Lakhyar

No.	Pos.	Nation	Player
21	MF	DOM	Lucas Bretón
22	MF	ESP	Marcos Rosa
24	FW	ESP	Álvaro Artiles
27	DF	NGR	Wahab Musa
29	DF	ESP	Rafa Hidalgo
31	GK	ESP	Jorge Ruiz
—	GK	ESP	Andrés Céspedes
—	DF	ESP	Alfonso Rodríguez
—	DF	MLI	Moussa Diarra
—	FW	ESP	Adri López
—	FW	ESP	Basti Jr
—	FW	ESP	Cristian Sarria

=== From Youth Academy ===
Note: Flags indicate national team as defined under FIFA eligibility rules; some limited exceptions apply. Players may hold more than one non-FIFA nationality.

No.	Pos.	Nation	Player
26	MF	MLI	Cherif Diarra
28	MF	ESP	Diego Ramírez

=== Out on loan ===
Note: Flags indicate national team as defined under FIFA eligibility rules; some limited exceptions apply. Players may hold more than one non-FIFA nationality.

No.	Pos.	Nation	Player
—	DF	GHA	Abubakar Seidu (at Mijas-Las Lagunas until 30 June 2027)

=== Current technical staff ===
Position	Staff
Head coach	(Spain) Francisco Bravo
Assistant coach	Vacant
Fitness coach	(Spain) Miguel Ángel Salgado
Goalkeeping coach	(Spain) César Lagos
Doctor	(Spain) Mario Guerra
Physiotherapist	(Spain) José Luis Gálvez (Brazil) Jackson Moreira
Kit man	(Spain) Miguel Meléndez (Spain) Manolo Santiago
Delegate	(Spain) Mariano Santiago
Match delegate	(Spain) Sabri

Last updated: 24 November 2025
Source: Málaga CF (in Spanish)

== Selected former coaches ==
- (Spain) José Mari Bakero
- (Spain) Francisco Carrasco
- (Spain) Antonio Tapia
- (Argentina) Armando Husillos
- (Panama) Dely Valdés
