= CD Rincón =

Association football club in Spain

Rincón
- Full name: Club Deportivo Rincón
- Founded: 1964
- Ground: Francisco Romero, Rincón de la Victoria, Málaga, Andalusia, Spain
- Capacity: 3,000
- Chairman: Paco 'Barriga' Jiménez
- Manager: Francis Parrado
- League: División de Honor – Group 2
- 2025–26: Primera Andaluza Málaga, 2nd of 16 (promoted via play-offs)
Home colours	Away colours

Club Deportivo Rincón is a Spanish football team based in Rincón de la Victoria, Málaga, in the autonomous community of Andalusia. Founded in 1964, it currently plays in División de Honor – Group 2, holding home matches at Estadio Francisco Romero, with a capacity of 3,000 spectators.

== Season to season ==
Season	Tier	Division	Place	Copa del Rey
1971–72	5	2ª Reg.	9th	
1972–73	5	2ª Reg.		
1973–74	5	2ª Reg.		
1974–75	5	2ª Reg.		
1975–76	6	2ª Reg.	11th	
1976–77	6	2ª Reg.	1st	
1977–78	7	2ª Reg.	8th	
1978–79	7	2ª Reg.	9th	
1979–80	7	2ª Reg.	5th	
1980–81	6	1ª Reg.	11th	
1981–82	5	Reg. Pref.	13th	
1982–83	6	1ª Reg.	5th	
1983–84	5	Reg. Pref.	18th	
1984–85	5	Reg. Pref.	19th	
1985–86	6	1ª Reg.	3rd	
1986–87	6	1ª Reg.	4th	
1987–88	5	Reg. Pref.	15th	
1988–89	6	1ª Reg.	5th	
1989–90	6	1ª Reg.	3rd	
1990–91	5	Reg. Pref.	17th	

Season	Tier	Division	Place	Copa del Rey
1991–92	6	1ª Reg.		
1992–93	6	1ª Reg.		
1993–94	6	1ª Reg.		
1994–95	6	1ª Reg.		
1995–96	6	1ª Reg.		
1996–97	6	1ª Reg.		
1997–98	5	Reg. Pref.	18th	
1998–99	6	1ª Reg.	5th	
1999–2000	6	1ª Reg.	5th	
2000–01	6	1ª Reg.	15th	
2001–02	7	2ª Reg.	3rd	
2002–03	6	1ª Reg.	9th	
2003–04	6	1ª Reg.	17th	
2004–05	7	1ª Reg.	7th	
2005–06	7	1ª Reg.	2nd	
2006–07	6	Reg. Pref.	9th	
2007–08	6	Reg. Pref.	5th	
2008–09	6	Reg. Pref.	7th	
2009–10	6	Reg. Pref.	2nd	
2010–11	5	1ª And.	13th	

Season	Tier	Division	Place	Copa del Rey
2011–12	5	1ª And.	12th	
2012–13	5	1ª And.	12th	
2013–14	5	1ª And.	5th	
2014–15	5	1ª And.	1st	
2015–16	4	3ª	13th	
2016–17	4	3ª	7th	
2017–18	4	3ª	13th	
2018–19	4	3ª	17th	
2019–20	5	Div. Hon.	4th	
2020–21	5	Div. Hon.	4th	First round
2021–22	6	Div. Hon.	6th	
2022–23	6	Div. Hon.	1st	First round
2023–24	5	3ª Fed.	17th	
2024–25	6	Div. Hon.	13th	
2025–26	7	1ª And.		

- 4 seasons in Tercera División
- 1 season in Tercera Federación
