= Juani (footballer, born 2007) =

Spanish footballer

Personal information
- Full name: Juan Francisco Fernández Martín
- Date of birth: 17 January 2007 (age 19)
- Place of birth: Málaga, Spain
- Height: 1.72 m (5 ft 8 in)
- Position: Winger

Team information
- Current team: Málaga B
- Number: 17

Youth career
- 2013–2016: Cortijillo Bazán
- 2016–2019: Romeral
- 2019–2021: Puerto Malagueño
- 2021–2022: San Félix
- 2022–2025: Málaga

Senior career*
Years	Team	Apps	(Gls)
2024–	Málaga B	65	(5)
2026–	Málaga	1	(0)
- * Club domestic league appearances and goals as of 19 August 2026

Juan Francisco Fernández Martín (born 17 January 2007), commonly known as Juani, is a Spanish footballer who plays as a winger for Atlético Malagueño.

== Career ==
Born in Málaga, Andalusia, Juani represented CD Cortijillo Bazán, CDF Romeral and CD Puerto Malagueño before joining the structure of Málaga CF in 2021, but spent his first year with affiliate side CD San Félix. He made his senior debut with the reserves on 8 September 2024, playing the last 28 minutes of a 5–1 Tercera Federación away routing of CP Almería.

On 11 February 2025, after establishing himself as a regular starter for the B's, Juani renewed his contract until 2028. He made his first team debut on 27 October of the following year, starting in a 3–0 away win over Sporting de Alcázar CF, for the season's Copa del Rey.

Juani made his professional – and La Liga – debut on 31 October 2026, coming on as a late substitute for Fernando Calero in a 2–1 away loss to Real Betis.
