= Treasure Cave, Spain =

Underwater cave in Spain

Coordinates: 36.7197°N 4.2976°W

Treasure Cave
- Cueva del Tesoro
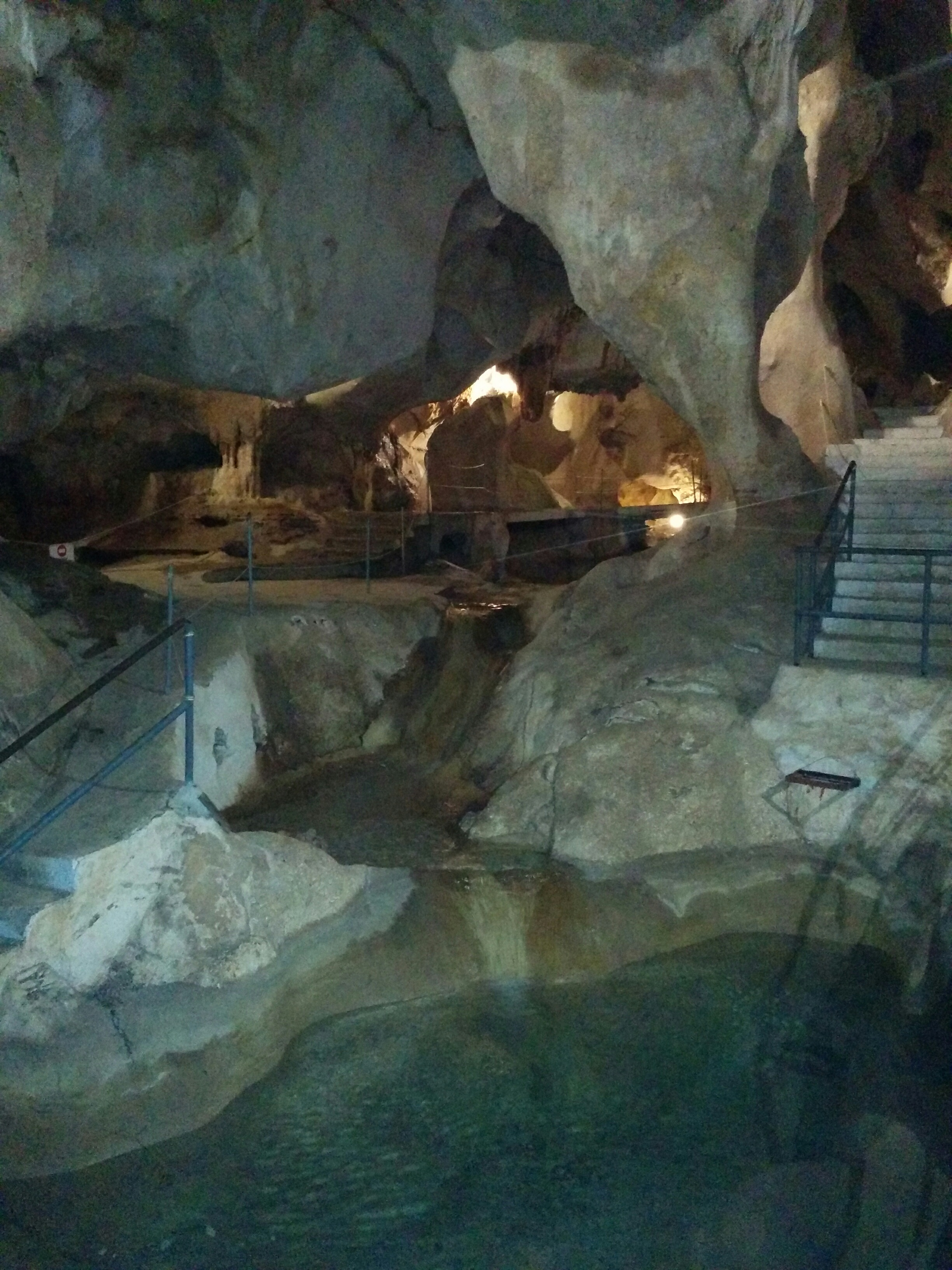
- The chamber of the lakes
- Interactive map of Treasure Cave
- Location: Spain
- Geology: Limestone
- Entrances: 1

The Treasure Cave (in Spanish: Cueva del Tesoro), sometimes called Cueva del Higuerón, is one of only three submarine caves known in the world, and the only one in Europe. It is located in the municipality of Rincón de la Victoria, near the city of Málaga. The cave is carved into a limestone promontory, forming a cliff on the shores of the Mediterranean Sea.

Its name comes from a legend about a treasure of the Almoravid dynasty, found, it is said, inside the cave.

Human footprints from 40,000 years ago have been found at the site.

It was declared a Cultural Heritage Site (Bien de Interés Cultural, BIC) in 1985.

== History ==
The legend of the five king's treasure refers to a tale of the riches collected by five kings of the Almoravid dynasty, whose emperor Tesufin ibn Ali decided would be hidden in this cave. With the help of a trust-worthy man and slaves (who were executed after the task was done), he allegedly concealed the valuables within the chambers and covered the entrance, so that it could never be found.

Roman general Marcus Crassus is said to have hidden in this cave for 8 months, having a chamber named after him.

Professor Laza Palacio, who became the owner of the cave in the 20th century, found a ceramic lamp during his excavations, in which 6 Almoravid gold coins from the time of Ali ibn Yusuf had been inserted.

In the 19th century, Antonio de la Nari, a native of Switzerland, spent almost 30 years searching for the legendary treasure of the five kings, opening galleries and passages with dynamite. He died in 1847 as a result of one of his explosions.

== Chambers ==
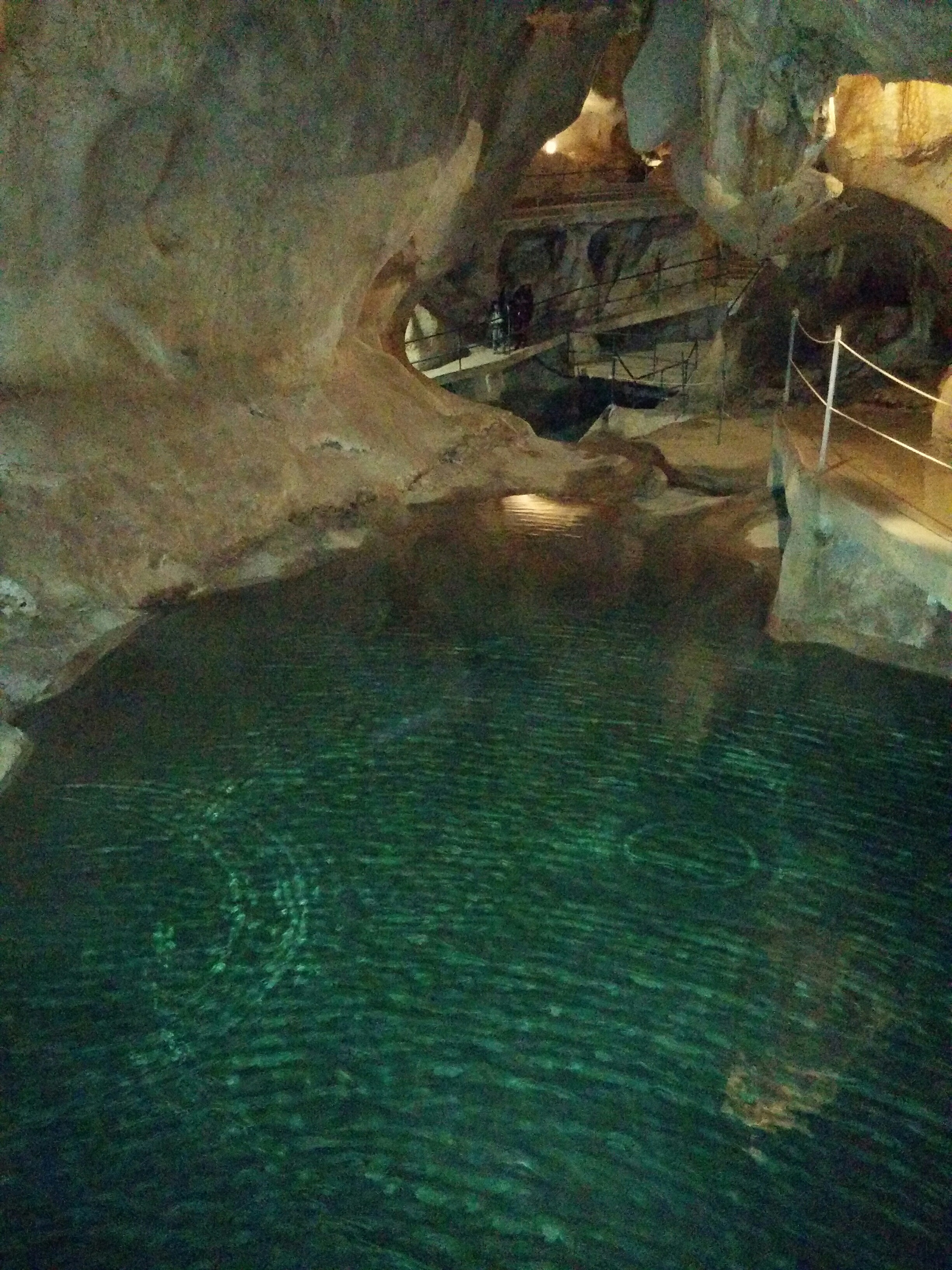
Lake Chamber

The cave is composed of a series of chambers, including:

- Virgin's Chamber
- Cave Paintings Area
- Labyrinthine Galleries
- Volcano Chamber
- Lake Chamber
- Marcus Crassus' Chamber
- Noctiluca Chamber

== Archeological remains ==
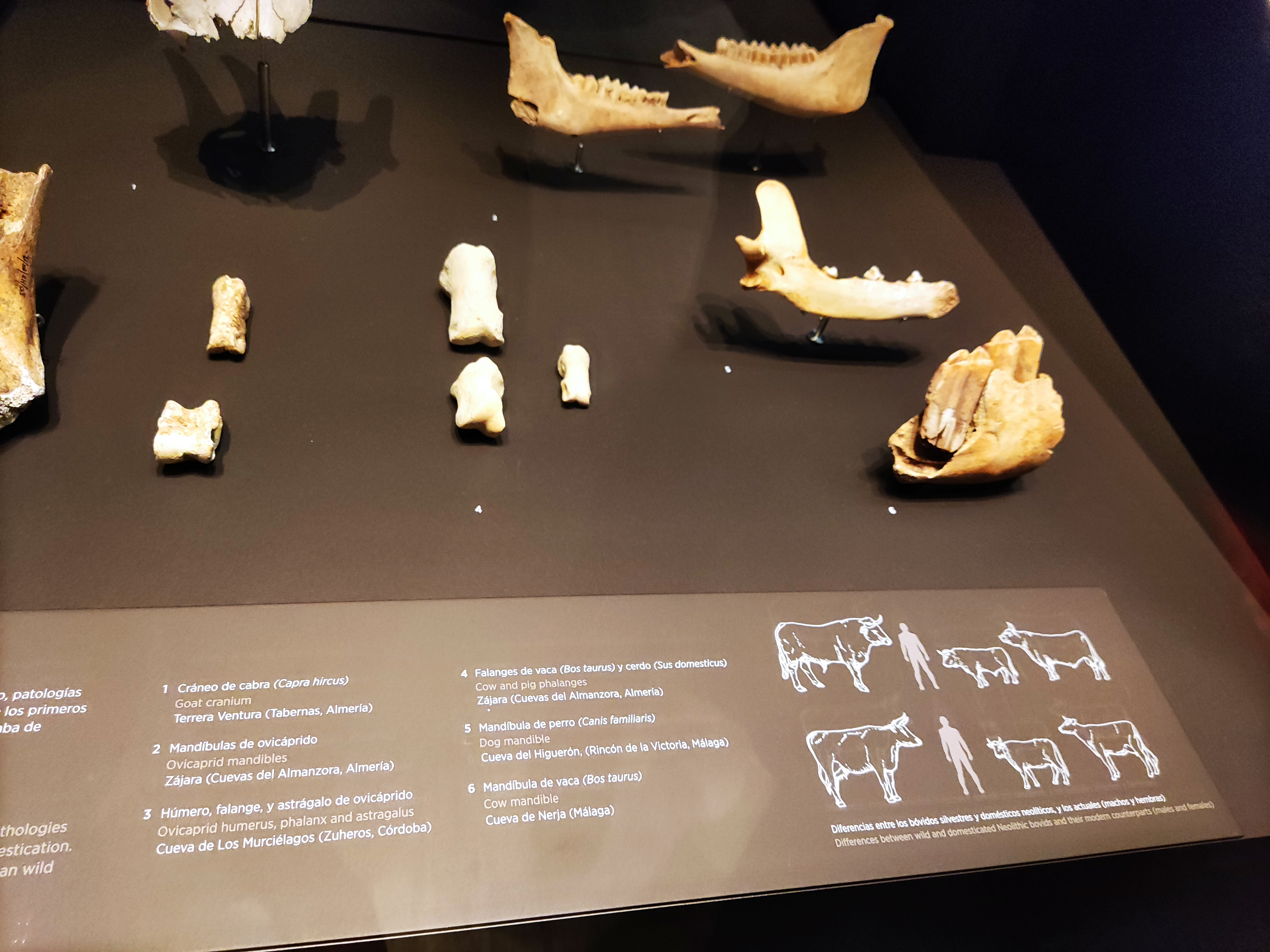
Animal remains found in the cave from the Neolithical period, currently located at the National Archaeological Museum in Madrid.

Exploration of the cave has revealed a series of archeological finds, including rock art such engravings and hand impressions from the Paleolithic.

In April 2025, archeologist Pedro Cantalejo and his research team announced the discovery of 40,000 year-old human footprints in nine different places in caves around the area, making them the oldest to have been found and dated in the Mediterranean area so far.

Human and animal remains have also been found in the cave, as well as ceramic remains from the Neolithic period that can be found in Madrid's National Archaeological Museum.

== Film Shoots ==
The Treasure Cave has been the setting for several film shoots, including music videos and short films. Some include:

- 2015: Los Chimplonitos, short film directed by Alberto Pons.
- 2019: Music video of the song "Cinco Reyes" by the band Def Con Dos, directed by Alberto Pons, as well as a short film by the same name and director.
- 2019: Recording of the album Ortigosa en Directo.
- In 2019, some scenes for the series Warrior Nun were recorded in the cave. It premiered on Netflix in 2020.
