= Rincón de la Victoria =

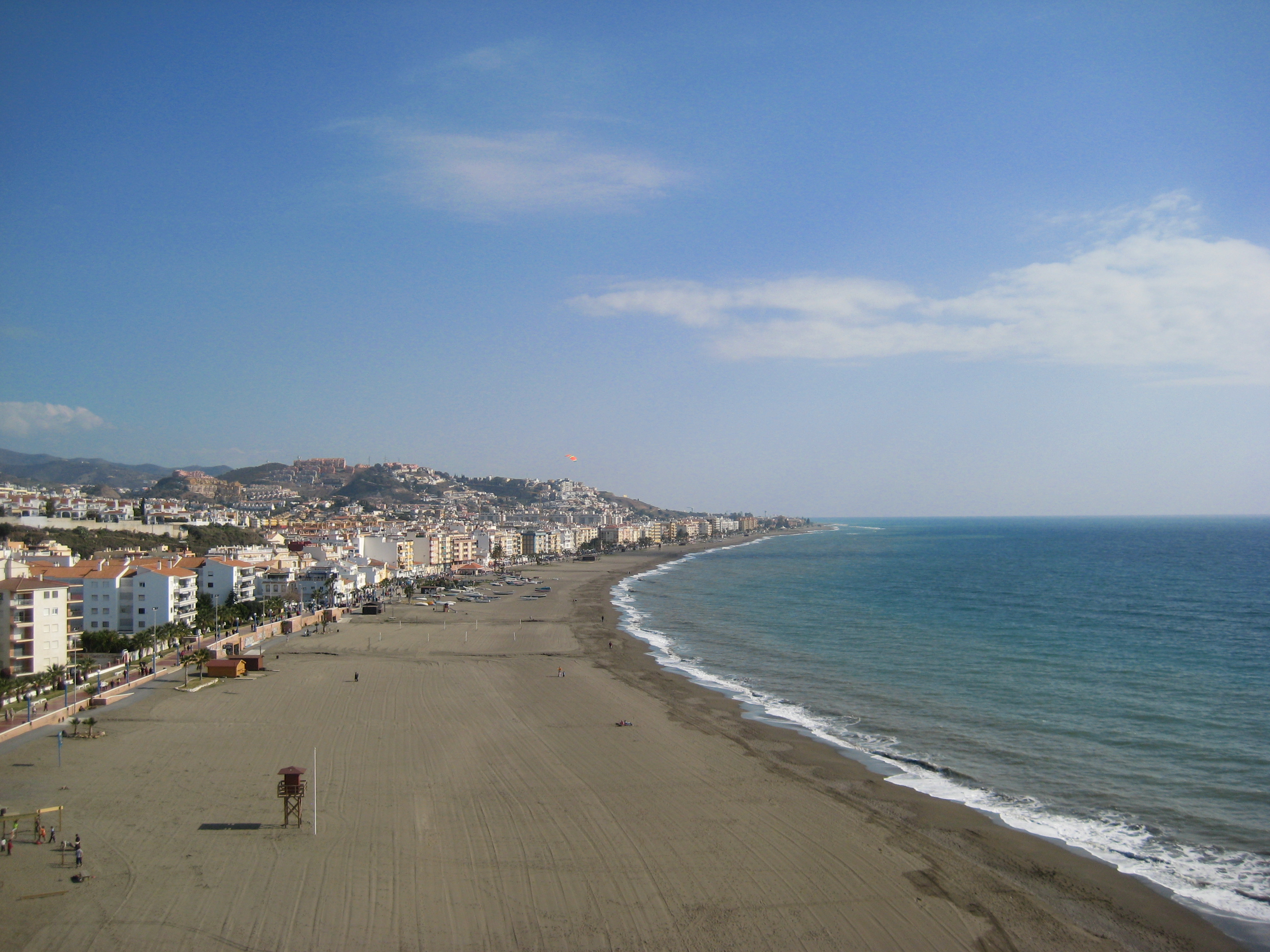

- Flag Coat of arms

- Location of Rincón de la Victoria

- Location in Spain.
- Coordinates: 36°43′N 4°17′W
- Sovereign state: Spain
- Autonomous community: Andalusia
- Province: Málaga
- Comarca: Axarquía

Government
  - Mayor: Francisco Salado

Area
  - Total: 27.51 km^{2} (10.62 sq mi)

Population (2025-01-01)
  - Total: 52,454
  - Density: 1,907/km^{2} (4,938/sq mi)
- Demonym: Rinconeros
- Time zone: UTC+1 (CET)
  - Summer (DST): UTC+2 (CEST)
- Website: Official website

Rincón de la Victoria (Spanish pronunciation: [riŋˈkon de la βiɣˈtoɾja]) is a municipality in the province of Málaga in the autonomous community of Andalusia in southern Spain. It is the municipality with the highest well-being in the province of Malaga, according to the Synthetic Indicator of Economic Welfare developed by Andalusian Analysts. According to the same study, Rincón de la Victoria has the highest income per capita in Andalucia.

== History ==
Archaeological findings at the Cueva del Tesoro testify the human presence as early as the Palaeolithic Age. There are remains of walls from around 1000 BC which perhaps included an Iberian settlement.

Around 50 BC the Carthaginians established a port in a harbour nearby, followed by the Romans, who built here a fortified village called Bezmiliana. The presence of a Greek colony is unconfirmed. Under the Moors it became a larger city, described by the 11th century traveller al-Idrisi.

After the conquest of the area under the Catholic Monarchs, the town experienced a period of decline which lasted until the 18th century.

== Place names ==
Until 1949, the current municipality was officially called Benagalbón. The name of the municipality changed due to the loss of importance of that centre in favour of Rincón, where the municipal administration was moved. The name Rincón has its origin in the 19th century, with the establishment of a fishing village on a beach located between two rocky promontories. In that place there was a monastery of the Order of the Minims, which was in charge of the cult of the Virgin of Victory. The name of Benagalbón, for its part, is of Arabic origin and comes from the gentilic Galb-un, preceded by bina or bena, which means family, house or tribe.

== Geography ==
The municipality of Rincón de la Victoria extends along the southern foothills of the Montes de Málaga, which in this area fall to the sea in low cliffs that alternate with coves and plains along the coast. It is therefore a generally abrupt relief. The maximum altitude of the municipality reaches 521 meters above sea level, although only a little more than 16% of the total surface area of the municipality is located above 200 meters above sea level, which corresponds to the northern area. Inland, the Benagalbón valley can be distinguished, an environment formed by the stream of the same name and occupied by subtropical orchards and fruit trees and greenhouses.

The urbanised area extends over almost the entire southern half of the municipality. It is roughly delimited to the north by the Autovía A-7, with the exception of the centre of Benagalbón and other small centres scattered inland. At the eastern end of the urban area, an area known as Añoreta has been built to the north of the motorway. Also, several housing developments have been built to the north of the motorway in the western end of the municipality, above the area of La Cala del Moral, an area known as Parque Victoria.

The traditional coastal centres are, from west to east: La Cala del Moral, Rincón de la Victoria and Torre de Benagalbón, originally established by fishing settlements that have gradually grown to form a single coastal urban area.

=== Climate ===
Rincón de la Victoria has a mediterranean climate (Köppen climate classification: Csa), bordering on a hot semi-arid climate (Köppen: BSh) with very mild winters and hot, dry summers. With an average annual temperature of 20.7 °C (69.3 °F) in the last 20 years, it is the hottest city in mainland Spain annually and it is located in one of the few parts of Spain where the average annual temperature exceeds 20 °C (68 °F) for the period 1991-2020. Rainfall is relatively low compared to other Spanish regions with a Mediterranean climate, receiving only 19 mm more than its threshold. Winter temperatures are very mild (exceptionally mild by European standards), rarely falling below 5 °C (41 °F) and it is very common for days to be above 20 °C (68 °F) in January and February. Summers are hot with temperatures often hovering around 32 °C (90 °F), while nights remain relatively warm, between 22 °C (72 °F) and 24 °C (75 °F). Since records began, Rincón de la Victoria has never recorded a single day of frost, not even temperatures below 2 °C (36 °F).

Climate data for Rincón de la Victoria (2006-2025), extremes (2006-present)
Month	Jan	Feb	Mar	Apr	May	Jun	Jul	Aug	Sep	Oct	Nov	Dec	Year
Record high °C (°F)	26.2 (79.2)	28.7 (83.7)	33.7 (92.7)	35.8 (96.4)	35.8 (96.4)	40.8 (105.4)	41.8 (107.2)	43.1 (109.6)	38.0 (100.4)	35.7 (96.3)	32.3 (90.1)	28.6 (83.5)	43.1 (109.6)
Mean daily maximum °C (°F)	19.0 (66.2)	19.8 (67.6)	21.5 (70.7)	23.4 (74.1)	26.3 (79.3)	29.3 (84.7)	31.9 (89.4)	32.7 (90.9)	29.9 (85.8)	26.5 (79.7)	22.0 (71.6)	19.8 (67.6)	25.2 (77.3)
Daily mean °C (°F)	14.8 (58.6)	15.4 (59.7)	16.9 (62.4)	18.8 (65.8)	21.5 (70.7)	24.5 (76.1)	27.0 (80.6)	28.0 (82.4)	25.5 (77.9)	22.3 (72.1)	17.9 (64.2)	15.7 (60.3)	20.7 (69.2)
Mean daily minimum °C (°F)	10.5 (50.9)	11.1 (52.0)	12.3 (54.1)	14.2 (57.6)	16.7 (62.1)	19.6 (67.3)	22.1 (71.8)	23.2 (73.8)	21.0 (69.8)	18.0 (64.4)	13.7 (56.7)	11.6 (52.9)	16.2 (61.1)
Record low °C (°F)	2.8 (37.0)	3.9 (39.0)	6.7 (44.1)	8.9 (48.0)	9.5 (49.1)	15.2 (59.4)	16.7 (62.1)	17.0 (62.6)	16.0 (60.8)	9.3 (48.7)	7.4 (45.3)	5.6 (42.1)	2.8 (37.0)
Average precipitation mm (inches)	47.1 (1.85)	40.8 (1.61)	75.2 (2.96)	36.9 (1.45)	21.2 (0.83)	2.1 (0.08)	0.2 (0.01)	0.9 (0.04)	20.4 (0.80)	49.2 (1.94)	74.0 (2.91)	61.5 (2.42)	429.5 (16.9)
Source: Agencia Estatal de Meteorologia

== Main sights ==
- Castle (18th century)
- Archaeological area of Loma-Torre de Benagalbón, including a Roman villa
- Archaeological Park of the Mediterranean
- Archaeological remains of Bezmiliana
- Cueva del Tesoro ("Grotto of the Treasure")
- Museum of Arts and Traditions
- Museum of Maritime Arts

== See also ==
- List of municipalities in Málaga
