= Ciudad Deportiva de El Viso =

Football training ground in Andalusia, Spain

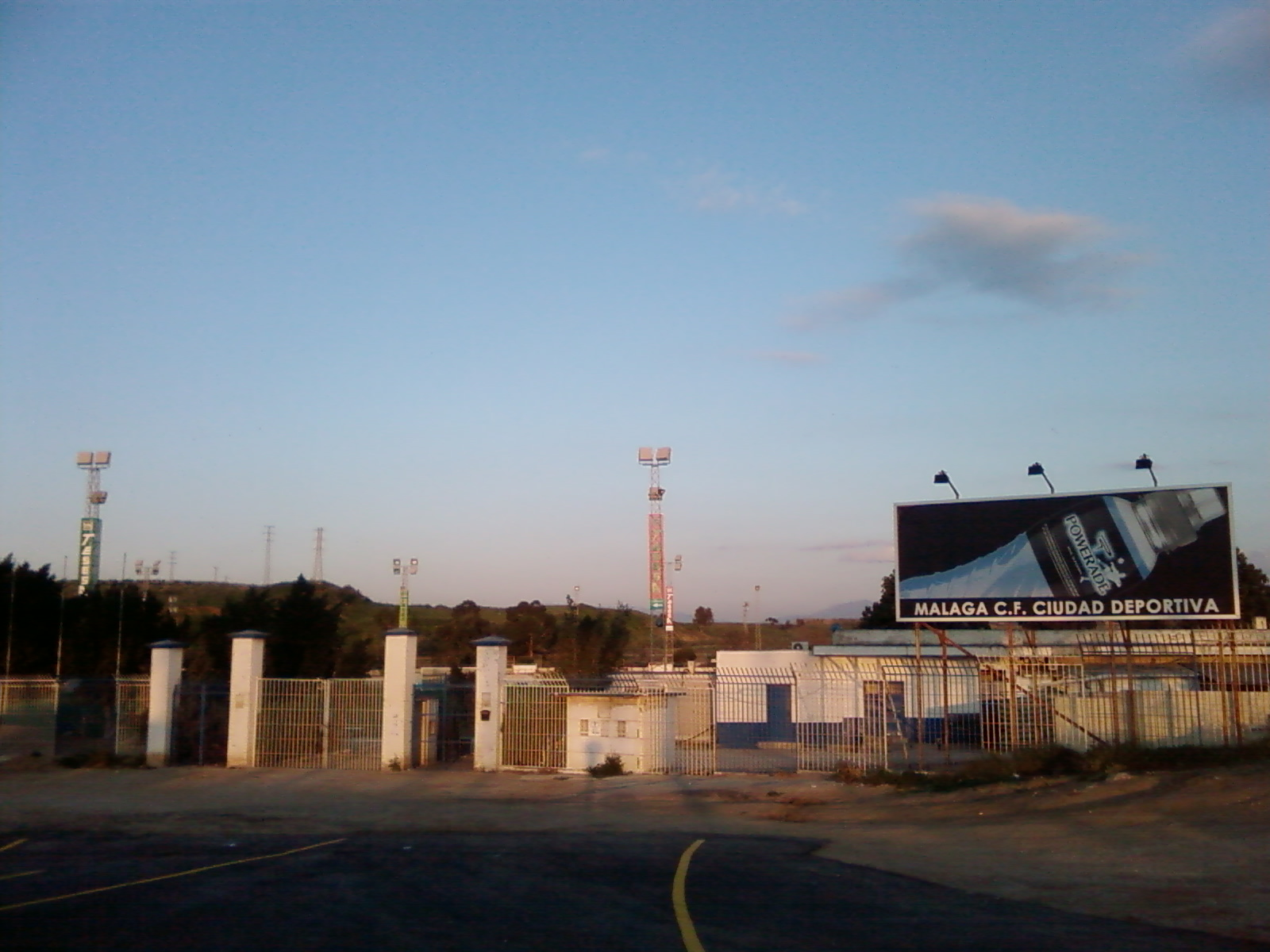
- Interactive map of Ciudad Deportiva de El Viso
- Location: Málaga, Andalusia
- Coordinates: 36°42′57″N 04°29′04″W
- Owner: Málaga CF
- Type: Football training ground

Construction
- Opened: 1990

Tenant
- Málaga CF (training) (1990-)

Ciudad Deportiva de El Viso is the training ground of Málaga CF. It is located in the Andalusian city of Málaga.

== Facilities ==
- Ciudad Deportiva Stadium with a capacity of 1,300 seats.
- 1 grass pitch.
- 2 mini grass pitches.
- Service centre with gymnasium.
