= Sten Glenn Håberg =

Norwegian footballer (born 1964)

Sten Glenn Håberg (born 22 April 1964) is a Norwegian former football player who played for Lillestrøm, Start and Brann. He played a total of 208 games in the Norwegian Premier League between 1981 and 1993, and scored 60 goals. For Start, he played 130 games and scored 37 goals, and for Lillestrøm he played 40 games and scored 16 goals, and he was also a losing cup-finalist for Lillestrøm in 1986. He also won 8 caps for Norway.
