= Olav Klepp =

Norwegian footballer (born 1962)

Personal information
- Date of birth: 13 July 1962 (age 64)
- Position: Midfielder

Senior career*
Years	Team	Apps	(Gls)
1980–1987	IK Start		
1987	Brøndby IF		
1989–1991	IK Start	58	(9)

International career
1987	Norway	1	(0)
- * Club domestic league appearances and goals

Olav Klepp (born 13 July 1962) is a Norwegian former professional footballer who played as a midfielder. He made one appearance for the Norway national team in 1987.

== Career ==
Klepp made his senior debut with Kristiansand-based club IK Start as a 17-year-old in 1980, scoring the last goal in a 3–1 win against Vålerenga. He won the 1980 league title with IK Start and came third in 1983 and 1984. In 1987 he joined Danish club Brøndby IF on a two-year contract following a try-out match but returned to IK Start soon after. He retired due to back problems in 1991, having made 324 appearances for IK Start.

Klepp earned one cap with the Norway national team, in a match against Turkey in 1987.

== Style of play ==
Klepp had a good midfield partnership with teammate Svein Mathisen and carried a goal threat.

== Later life ==
After his retirement from playing, Klepp worked as a kitchen tradesman. By 2011, he had been in the business for 17 years.

== Honours ==
IK Start

- Norwegian First Division: 1980
