= Sandro (footballer, born 1974) =

Spanish footballer (born 1974)

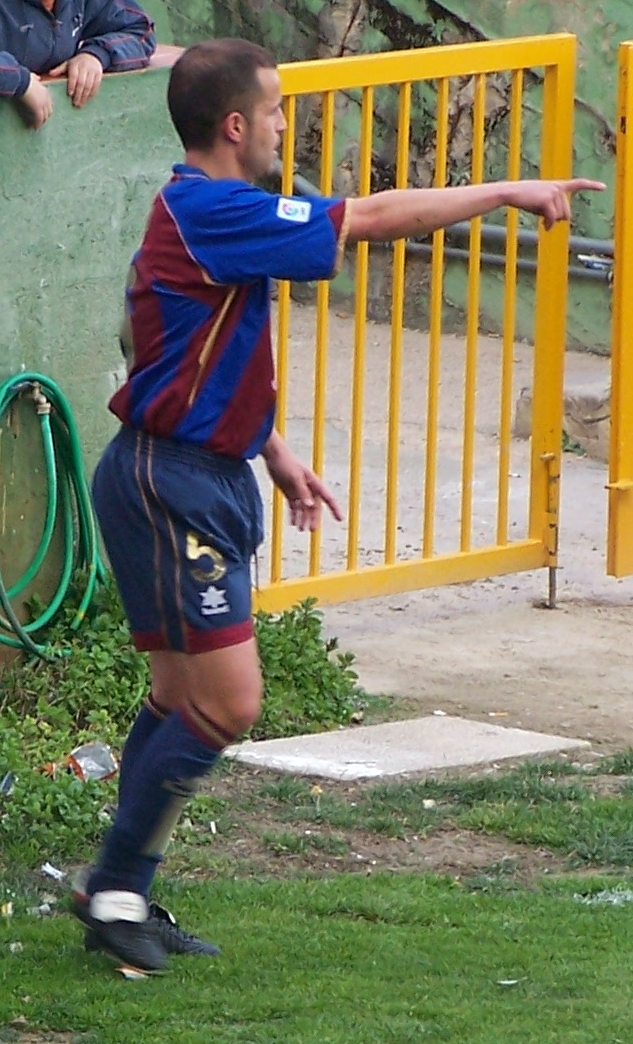
- Sandro in action for Levante (2006)

Personal information
- Full name: Carlos Alejandro Sierra Fumero
- Date of birth: 14 October 1974 (age 52)
- Place of birth: Las Galletas, Spain
- Height: 1.70 m (5 ft 7 in)
- Position: Midfielder

Youth career
- Tenerife
- Real Madrid

Senior career*
Years	Team	Apps	(Gls)
1992–1997	Real Madrid B	58	(6)
1994–1997	Real Madrid	22	(2)
1996–1997	→ Las Palmas (loan)	18	(0)
1998–2003	Málaga	149	(4)
2003–2006	Levante	59	(0)
2006–2008	Málaga	47	(1)
2014–2016	Ibarra		
Total		353	(13)

International career
1990–1991	Spain U16	19	(0)
1991	Spain U17	11	(0)
1992–1993	Spain U18	14	(1)
1992	Spain U19	7	(1)
1994–1995	Spain U21	7	(2)
Medal record
Men's football
Representing Spain
FIFA World U-17
Runner-up	1991 Italy
UEFA Euro U-16
Winner	1991 Switzerland
- * Club domestic league appearances and goals

Carlos Alejandro Sierra Fumero (born 14 October 1974), known as Sandro, is a Spanish retired professional footballer who played as an attacking midfielder.

== Club career ==
Born in Las Galletas, Santa Cruz de Tenerife, Canary Islands, Sandro began his professional career with Real Madrid's reserves, receiving his first-team debut on 10 September 1994 against CD Logroñés, under Jorge Valdano. He helped with 13 La Liga matches in that season's victorious campaign, but was soon pushed to the sidelines by another youth product, Guti.

After a stint with UD Las Palmas in the second division, Sandro dropped down to the third level in January 1998, and helped Málaga CF achieve a top flight promotion in just two seasons – he played 29 games in the latter, scoring once. In summer 1997, he had a trial at Newcastle United, but it did not lead to a contract.

In 2003, Sandro signed for Levante UD. Again used regularly in his first season, for another promotion, he featured very rarely in 2004–05's first division (only three appearances). The Valencians were eventually relegated, but he remained with them for a further year.

Sandro returned to Málaga for 2006–07, with the side again in division two. After the 2008 promotion, his contract expired and he retired; club chairman, former Madrid teammate Fernando Sanz, offered him a job as technical director which he accepted.

== Honours ==
=== Club ===
Real Madrid

- La Liga: 1994–95

Málaga

- UEFA Intertoto Cup: 2002

Levante

- Segunda División: 2003–04

=== Country ===
Spain U16

- UEFA European Under-16 Championship: 1991

Spain U17

- FIFA U-17 World Cup: Runner-up 1991
