= Mikel Roteta =

Spanish footballer and manager

Personal information
- Full name: Miguel Ángel Roteta Lopetegui
- Date of birth: 16 January 1970 (age 56)
- Place of birth: San Sebastián, Spain
- Height: 1.85 m (6 ft 1 in)
- Position: Centre back

Youth career
- Real Sociedad

Senior career*
Years	Team	Apps	(Gls)
1988–1990	Real Sociedad B	63	(7)
1990–1991	Real Sociedad	3	(0)
1991–1994	Barcelona B	38	(0)
1994–1995	Cartagena	36	(0)
1995–1997	Jaén	71	(1)
1997–2003	Málaga	183	(7)
2003–2004	Murcia	11	(0)
2004–2005	Xerez	30	(2)
2005–2006	Real Unión	26	(1)
Total		461	(18)

International career
1991	Spain U23	1	(1)

Managerial career
- 2007–2009: Añorga (youth)
- 2009–2010: Real Unión B
- 2011–2012: Usurbil
- * Club domestic league appearances and goals

Miguel Ángel 'Mikel' Roteta Lopetegui (born 16 January 1970 in San Sebastián, Basque Country) is a Spanish former footballer who played as a central defender.

== Honours ==
Málaga

- UEFA Intertoto Cup: 2002
- Segunda División B: 1997–98
