= Miguel Ángel (footballer, born 1978) =

Spanish footballer

Personal information
- Full name: Miguel Ángel Lozano Ayala
- Date of birth: 16 September 1978 (age 48)
- Place of birth: Sabadell, Spain
- Height: 1.82 m (5 ft 11 1/2 in)
- Position: Defensive midfielder

Youth career
- 1993–1995: Sabadell

Senior career*
Years	Team	Apps	(Gls)
1994–1995	Sabadell B	29	(8)
1995–1996	Sabadell	18	(0)
1996–1997	Barcelona C	32	(2)
1997–1999	Barcelona B	85	(15)
2000–2001	Levante	63	(2)
2001–2005	Málaga	131	(7)
2005–2008	Betis	33	(0)
2007–2008	→ Levante (loan)	23	(1)
2008–2010	Málaga	19	(0)
2009–2010	→ Gimnàstic (loan)	29	(2)
2010–2011	Ponferradina	17	(0)
2011	Badalona	14	(1)
2011–2012	Castellón	21	(7)
2012	Terrassa	14	(0)
2012–2014	Caldes Montbui	52	(24)
Total		580	(69)
- * Club domestic league appearances and goals

Miguel Ángel Lozano Ayala (born 16 September 1978), known as Miguel Ángel, is a Spanish former professional footballer who played as a defensive midfielder.

Over eight seasons, he amassed La Liga totals of 206 matches and eight goals, mainly representing Málaga (five years, two spells). He appeared in the Champions League with Betis.

== Club career ==
Born in Sabadell, Barcelona, Catalonia, Miguel Ángel began his career at hometown's CE Sabadell FC, where he played during the 1995–96 season in the Segunda División B. He moved to neighbours FC Barcelona in 1996, spending some time with its C and B teams.

In summer 1999, Miguel Ángel signed for Levante UD, where he spent two years in the Segunda División. In the 2001–02 campaign he joined Málaga CF, being a key element in midfield during his five-year stay, scoring seven La Liga goals and helping the side to the 2002 UEFA Intertoto Cup.

For 2005–06, Miguel Ángel was transferred to Andalusia neighbours Real Betis in a deal worth €2 million, signing a five-year contract with the club. Early into his first season, he suffered ligament damage to his right knee in a UEFA Champions League group stage match against Chelsea at Stamford Bridge, a 4–0 loss.

Miguel Ángel returned to Levante in July 2007 on a one-year loan, being released at the end of the campaign and subsequently rejoining Málaga. After being relatively used in the first season in his second spell, he was loaned to Gimnàstic de Tarragona in division two.

On 13 July 2010, Miguél Ángel was released by Málaga. Two weeks later, at nearly 32, he signed a one-year contract with SD Ponferradina, recently returned to the second tier; in the following transfer window, however, he was released.

Miguel Ángel then spent three years in the lower leagues, with CF Badalona, CD Castellón and Terrassa FC. He moved abroad for the first time on 28 May 2015, becoming player-manager of FC Ordino in Andorra's Primera Divisió.

== Honours ==
Málaga

- UEFA Intertoto Cup: 2002
