= Francis Bravo (Spanish footballer) =

Spanish football manager (born 1974)

Personal information
- Full name: Francisco Javier López Bravo
- Date of birth: 6 April 1974 (age 52)
- Place of birth: Málaga, Spain
- Height: 1.78 m (5 ft 10 in)
- Position: Defender

Team information
- Current team: Málaga B (manager)

Youth career
- San Félix

Senior career*
Years	Team	Apps	(Gls)
1992–2003	Málaga	278	(9)
2003–2004	Rayo Vallecano	0	(0)
2004	Almería	8	(0)
2005	Portuense	8	(0)
2005–2007	Melilla	55	(0)
2007–2008	La Unión		
2008	Oviedo	14	(2)
2008–2010	Vélez	43	(1)
2010–2011	Rincón	11	(2)

Managerial career
- 2011–2013: Rincón (assistant)
- 2013–2014: Rincón (youth)
- 2014–2018: Rincón
- 2018–2019: Málaga (youth)
- 2019–2020: Rincón
- 2020–2025: Málaga B (assistant)
- 2025–: Málaga B
- * Club domestic league appearances and goals

Francisco Javier López "Francis" Bravo (born 6 April 1974) is a Spanish retired footballer who played as either a centre-back or a full-back, and the manager of Atlético Malagueño.

== Playing career ==
Born in Málaga, Andalusia, Bravo played for CD San Félix before joining Club Atlético Malagueño in 1992, aged 18. He remained at the side in the following years, when they changed name to Málaga CF, becoming a regular starter in the process and helping the club to their promotion to Segunda División in 1998.

Bravo made his professional debut on 30 August 1998, starting in a 2–1 home win over SD Eibar. He scored his first goal in the category on 18 April of the following year, netting the opener in a 3–0 home success over CA Osasuna, and was an undispusted starter as the club achieved a second consecutive promotion.

Bravo made his La Liga debut on 22 August 1999, playing the full 90 minutes in a 1–0 home win over RCD Espanyol. Regularly used in his first two years in the division, he scored his first goal in the category on 3 December 2000, netting his side's second in a 3–2 away loss to Real Oviedo.

After losing his starting spot in the 2001–02 season, Bravo was still a part of the squad which won the 2002 UEFA Intertoto Cup before signing for Rayo Vallecano in the second division in 2003. After failing to make an appearance for the latter side, he joined fellow league team UD Almería in January 2004.

After featuring sparingly, Bravo spent six months without a club before agreeing to a deal with Tercera División side Racing Club Portuense in January 2005. He moved to UD Melilla of Segunda División B in that summer, and was a first-choice during his two-year spell.

Bravo continued to play in the fourth tier in the following years, representing CD La Unión, Oviedo and Vélez CF. In 2010, he moved to Primera Andaluza side CD Rincón, and retired with the club in the following year, aged 37.

== Managerial career ==
Shortly after retiring, Bravo joined the staff of his last club Rincón, as an assistant. In 2014, after managing their Juvenil squad, he was named at the helm of the first team in the regional leagues, and managed to achieve promotion in his first season.

On 12 July 2018, Bravo returned to his main club Málaga after being appointed manager of the Juvenil División de Honor team. Roughly one year later, he returned to Rincón, again as manager of the main squad.

On 30 June 2020, Bravo again returned to Málaga, being Juan Francisco Funes' assistant at the reserves. On 20 November 2025, he was appointed manager of the side, after Funes was promoted to the first team.

== Managerial statistics ==
As of 18 April 2026

Managerial record by team and tenure
Team	Nat	From	To	Record								Ref
Team	Nat	From	To	G	W	D	L	GF	GA	GD	Win %	Ref
Rincón	(Spain)	10 June 2014	12 July 2018	148	60	34	54	213	203	+10	40.54	
Rincón	(Spain)	16 July 2019	25 June 2020	26	13	7	6	48	32	+16	50.00	
Atlético Malagueño	(Spain)	20 November 2025	Present	21	4	2	15	20	44	−24	19.05	
Total				195	77	43	75	281	279	+2	39.49	—

== Honours ==
Málaga

- Segunda División: 1998–99
- UEFA Intertoto Cup: 2002
