= Manuel Sánchez Torres =

Spanish footballer

Personal information
- Full name: Manuel Sánchez Torres
- Date of birth: 1 January 1960 (age 66)
- Place of birth: Terrassa, Spain
- Height: 1.83 m (6 ft 0 in)
- Position: Forward

Youth career
- PH Almelo

Senior career*
Years	Team	Apps	(Gls)
1978–1985	Twente	173	(52)
1985–1987	Valencia	35	(1)
1987–1990	Roda	46	(6)
1990–1991	NEC	36	(8)
1991–1992	Sportclub Enschede		
1992–1993	Heracles	0	(0)
Total		290	(67)
- * Club domestic league appearances and goals

Manuel Sánchez Torres (born 1 January 1960) is a Spanish former professional footballer who played as a forward.

Except for two seasons at Valencia, he spent his entire career in the Netherlands, where he appeared for three clubs – mainly Twente – and appeared in more than 250 competitive games.

== Career ==
Sánchez Torres was born in Terrassa, Barcelona, Catalonia. When he was seven years old, he moved with his parents to Almelo in the Netherlands, and started his career at local amateurs PH Almelo, being subsequently noticed and signed by Eredivisie club FC Twente.

On 17 September 1978, aged 18, Sánchez Torres made his league debut for Twente, in a home game against Sparta Rotterdam, scoring his first goal a few weeks later at HFC Haarlem and ending his first season with three goals in 23 matches as the Enschede side finished in 11th position and reached the final of the KNVB Cup, lost to league champions AFC Ajax.

From 1980 onwards, Sánchez Torres scored in double digits in every season, save for the 1982–83 campaign which ended in relegation to the Eerste Divisie. This was followed by immediate promotion, with the player netting 11 times for the runners-up.

Sánchez Torres returned to his country in summer 1985 by joining Valencia CF, making his debut for the Che on 31 August in a 2–1 home win over Real Valladolid where he left the pitch injured after 24 minutes. During his spell at the Mestalla Stadium, where he was coached by Alfredo Di Stéfano, he failed to reproduce his previous form, scoring only once and also suffering La Liga relegation in his first season; his acquisition was mostly financed by longtime supporter Emiliano Rojo, who lent 100.000 pesetas to the club.

After leaving Valencia, Sánchez Torres returned to the Netherlands with top-division Roda JC Kerkrade, but appeared sparingly for that and his following teams, NEC Nijmegen and Heracles Almelo due to injury (no games whatsoever for the latter), retiring from football in 1993 at age 33 and going on to work with physically disabled youngsters.

== Career statistics ==
Appearances and goals by club, season and competition
Club	Season	League		
Club	Season	Division	Apps	Goals
Twente	1978–79	Eredivisie	23	3
Twente	1979–80	Eredivisie	5	0
Twente	1980–81	Eredivisie	32	10
Twente	1981–82	Eredivisie	33	15
Twente	1982–83	Eredivisie	21	3
Twente	1983–84	Eerste Divisie	26	11
Twente	1984–85	Eredivisie	33	10
Twente	Total		173	52
Valencia	1985–86	La Liga	20	1
Valencia	1986–87	Segunda División	15	0
Valencia	Total		35	1
Roda	1987–88	Eredivisie	26	4
Roda	1988–89	Eredivisie	18	2
Roda	1989–90	Eredivisie	2	0
Roda	Total		46	6
NEC	1989–90	Eredivisie	12	1
NEC	1990–91	Eredivisie	24	7
NEC	Total		36	8
Heracles	1992–93	Eredivisie	0	0
Career total			290	67

== Honours ==
Valencia

- Segunda División: 1986–87
