= Manu Sánchez (footballer, born 1979) =

Spanish footballer

Personal information
- Full name: Antonio Manuel Sánchez Gómez
- Date of birth: 25 January 1979 (age 47)
- Place of birth: Fuengirola, Spain
- Height: 1.82 m (6 ft 0 in)
- Position: Midfielder

Youth career
- Real Madrid

Senior career*
Years	Team	Apps	(Gls)
1998–1999	Real Madrid C		
1998–2001	Real Madrid B	68	(9)
2002–2007	Málaga	97	(7)
2007–2008	Hércules	10	(0)
2009–2010	Antequera	10	(1)
Total		185	(17)

International career
1997	Spain U17	4	(2)
1997–1998	Spain U18	2	(0)
- * Club domestic league appearances and goals

Antonio Manuel 'Manu' Sánchez Gómez (born 25 January 1979) is a Spanish former professional footballer who played as a central midfielder.

== Club career ==
Sánchez was born in Fuengirola, Province of Málaga. He came through the ranks of Real Madrid but never made it past the reserves; he was however included in their squad for the 2000 FIFA Club World Championship. He joined local Málaga CF in January 2002, being relatively used over five and a half seasons.

Manu's best output came in the 2002–03 campaign, with six La Liga goals in 36 appearances – including a brace against Athletic Bilbao on 9 March 2003 for a 3–0 home win– with Málaga finishing 13th. Previously, he had helped the Andalusia team to reach the UEFA Cup via success in the Intertoto Cup.

In the summer of 2007, after having appeared in only three Segunda División games during the season due to contractual problems, Sánchez signed with Hércules CF in the same league, being released at the end of the campaign after playing just ten out of a possible 42 matches. In early 2009 he joined lowly Antequera CF in a return to his native region, with the club being eventually relegated to Tercera División.

== Honours ==
Málaga

- UEFA Intertoto Cup: 2002
