= Marcelo Romero =

Uruguayan footballer and manager (born 1976)

Personal information
- Full name: Cléver Marcelo Romero Silva
- Date of birth: 4 July 1976 (age 50)
- Place of birth: Montevideo, Uruguay
- Height: 1.77 m (5 ft 9 1/2 in)
- Position: Midfielder

Senior career*
Years	Team	Apps	(Gls)
1994–1996	Defensor	62	(5)
1997–2001	Peñarol	84	(5)
2001–2007	Málaga	130	(4)
2008	Lucena	14	(0)
2009	Carolina RailHawks	0	(0)
Total		290	(14)

International career
1995–2004	Uruguay	24	(0)

Managerial career
- 2011–2012: Alhaurín Torre (youth)
- 2012–2013: Alhaurín Torre
- 2014–2016: Málaga (assistant)
- 2016–2017: Málaga
- * Club domestic league appearances and goals

Cléver Marcelo Romero Silva (born 4 July 1976) is a Uruguayan former footballer who played as a defensive midfielder, and is a manager.

After emerging at Peñarol he spent seven years of his professional career in Spain, notably at the service of Málaga (six seasons), and played for Uruguay at the 2002 World Cup.

== Club career ==
Born in Montevideo, Romero played in the beginning of his career for local teams Defensor Sporting and Peñarol. In the middle of 2001 he was bought by La Liga club Málaga CF, teaming up with countryman Darío Silva. He was instrumental at the Andalusia side during his first four years, helping them to the quarter-finals of the 2002–03 UEFA Cup, via the Intertoto Cup.

In his final two seasons, however, Romero was virtually absent from the lineups, with 2006–07 being spent, with no success, in Segunda División. In early 2008 he had a brief spell with neighbours Lucena CF of Segunda División B and, on 4 February 2009, signed with Carolina RailHawks FC of the USL First Division. It quickly became apparent that he had suffered significant knee injuries which were not widely publicised, but subsequently all was revealed; physical problems limited him to one substitute appearance in a pre-season exhibition game, and he was released in April without having featured in the league.

Romero started working as a manager also in Spain, with amateurs Alhaurín de la Torre CF. He returned to Málaga in 2014, joining newly appointed Javi Gracia's coaching staff.

On 28 December 2016, following Juande Ramos' dismissal, Romero was appointed first-team manager indefinitely. The following 7 March, he was relieved of his duties.

== International career ==
Romero made his debut for the Uruguay national team on 20 September 1995, in a 1–3 away friendly defeat against Israel. After taking part in two Copa América editions, he played two games for his country at the 2002 FIFA World Cup (the group stage draws to France and Senegal).

In total, Romero earned 24 caps in a nine-year span.

== Managerial statistics ==
As of 5 March 2017

Managerial record by team and tenure
Team	Nat	From	To	Record							
Team	Nat	From	To	G	W	D	L	GF	GA	GD	Win %
Málaga	(Spain)	28 December 2016	6 March 2017	10	1	2	7	7	17	−10	10.00
Total				10	1	2	7	7	17	−10	10.00

== Honours ==
=== Club ===
Málaga

- UEFA Intertoto Cup: 2002

=== International ===
Uruguay

- Copa América: Runner-up 1999
