= Vicente Valcarce =

Spanish footballer and director

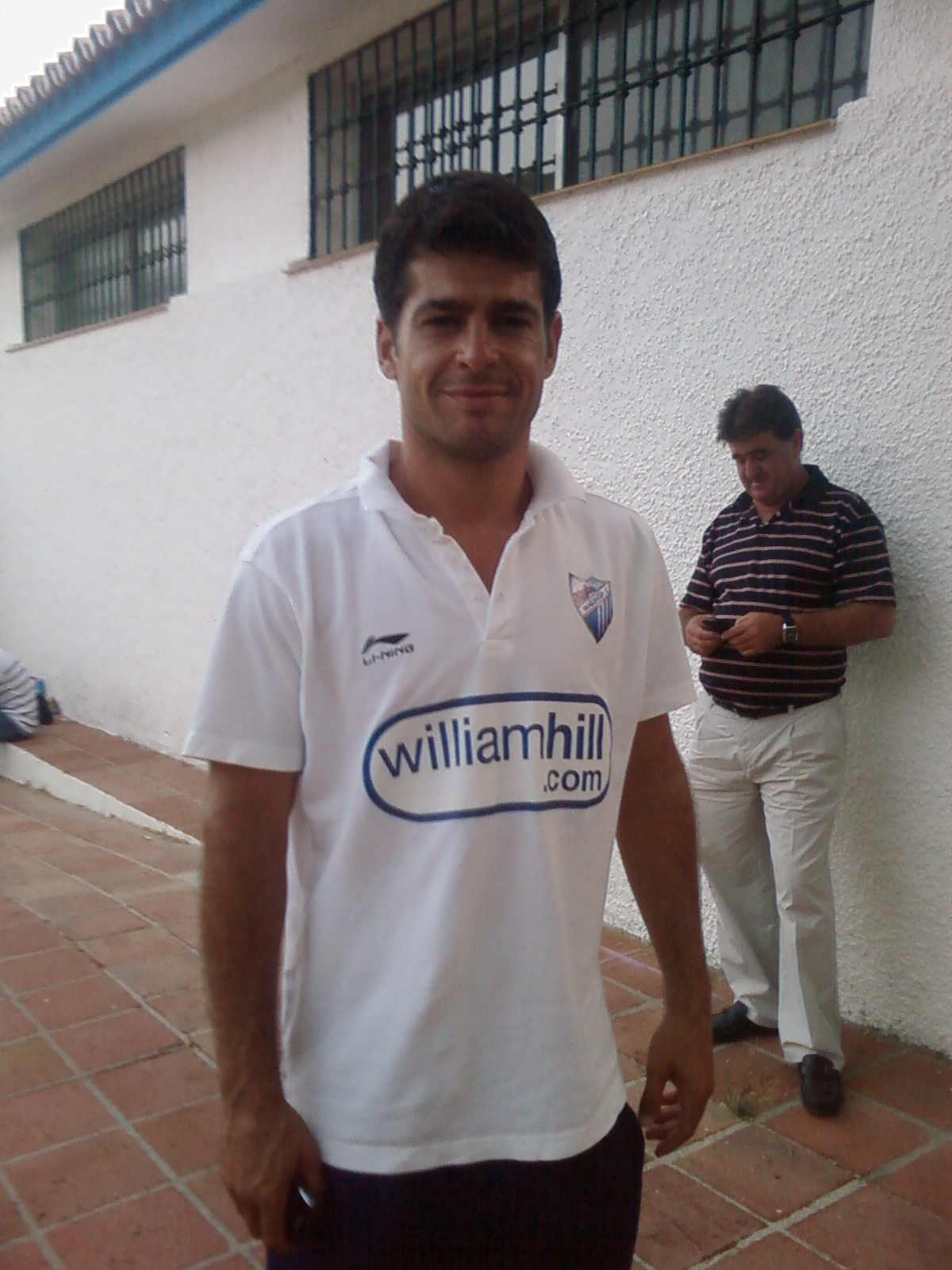
- Valcarce in 2010

Personal information
- Full name: Vicente Valcarce Cano
- Date of birth: 19 October 1974 (age 52)
- Place of birth: Arrecife, Spain
- Height: 1.70 m (5 ft 7 in)
- Position: Left back

Youth career
- 1990–1992: El Pardo
- 1992–1994: Real Madrid

Senior career*
Years	Team	Apps	(Gls)
1994–1995	Moscardó	35	(2)
1995–1996	Real Madrid C	33	(3)
1996–1998	Real Madrid B	50	(4)
1998–2008	Málaga	245	(5)
Total		363	(14)
- * Club domestic league appearances and goals

Vicente Valcarce Cano (born 19 October 1974 in Arrecife, Canary Islands) is a Spanish former footballer who played as a left back.

== Football career ==
After playing two years with the club's youth system, Valcarce started his professional career with Real Madrid, but never moved past the reserves. In the 1998–99 season he joined Málaga CF, helping the Andalusia team to a La Liga promotion in his first year and proceeding to be an everpresent fixture (37 first division games in 1999–2000 and rarely missing a match from 2002 to 2005).

After two Segunda División campaigns, contributing with five games to another promotion to the top flight in the latter, Valcarce retired in July 2008 at nearly 34, and joined Málaga's football directory.

== Honours ==
Málaga

- UEFA Intertoto Cup: 2002
