= 1983–84 in Swiss football =

Football in Switzerland
- Season: 1983–84

Men's football
- Nationalliga A: Grasshopper Club
- Nationalliga B: SC Zug
- 1. Liga: Overall champions FC Schaffhausen; Group 1: Etoile Carouge FC; Group 2: FC Köniz; Group 3: SC Kriens; Group 4: FC Schaffhausen
- Swiss Cup: Servette

Women's football
- Swiss Women's Super League: DFC Bern
- Swiss Cup: DFC Bern

The following is a summary of the 1983–84 season of competitive football in Switzerland.

== Nationalliga A ==
=== League table ===
Pos	Team	Pld	W	D	L	GF	GA	GD	Pts	Qualification
1	Grasshopper Club	30	19	6	5	59	32	+27	44	Championship play-off winners, qualified for 1984–85 European Cup
2	Servette	30	19	6	5	67	31	+36	44	Championship play-off loosers Swiss Cup winners, qualified for 1984–85 Cup Winners' Cup
3	Sion	30	18	7	5	74	39	+35	43	qualified for 1984–85 UEFA Cup
4	Xamax	30	15	10	5	54	27	+27	40	qualified for 1984–85 UEFA Cup
5	St. Gallen	30	16	8	6	57	41	+16	40	entered 1984 Intertoto Cup
6	Lausanne-Sport	30	13	8	9	49	37	+12	34	
7	La Chaux-de-Fonds	30	12	9	9	52	47	+5	33	
8	Wettingen	30	12	6	12	43	43	0	30	entered 1984 Intertoto Cup
9	Basel	30	11	6	13	55	59	−4	28	
10	Aarau	30	9	9	12	50	42	+8	27	
11	Young Boys	30	8	9	13	39	40	−1	25	
12	Zürich	30	8	8	14	39	56	−17	24	entered 1984 Intertoto Cup
13	Vevey-Sports	30	9	6	15	43	65	−22	24	
14	Luzern	30	9	4	17	35	52	−17	22	entered 1984 Intertoto Cup
15	Bellinzona	30	4	4	22	30	79	−49	12	Relegated to 1984–85 Nationalliga B
16	Chiasso	30	4	2	24	26	82	−56	10	Relegated to 1984–85 Nationalliga B

Source: rsssf.com
Rules for classification: 1) Points; 2) Goal difference within the league, but decider play-off for qualifiers;

=== Championship play-off ===
15 June 1984
Play-off

Grasshopper Club	1 – 0 (a.e.t.)	Servette
Egli 109' (pen.)	RSSSF summary

Wankdorf Stadium, Bern
Attendance: 30,000
Referee: (Switzerland) André Daina Eclépens

== Nationalliga B ==
=== League table ===
Pos	Team	Pld	W	D	L	GF	GA	GD	Pts	Qualification
1	SC Zug	30	16	9	5	64	33	+31	41	Promotion to 1984–85 Nationalliga A
2	FC Winterthur	30	16	9	5	56	43	+13	41	Promotion to 1984–85 Nationalliga A
3	Lugano	30	13	12	5	59	35	+24	38	
4	FC Martigny-Sports	30	13	7	10	49	40	+9	33	
5	FC Baden	30	13	7	10	60	53	+7	33	
6	FC Bulle	30	12	7	11	48	45	+3	31	
7	Mendrisiostar	30	9	12	9	41	35	+6	30	
8	FC Locarno	30	9	11	10	44	49	−5	29	
9	CS Chênois	30	10	9	11	42	51	−9	29	
10	FC Grenchen	30	8	12	10	41	45	−4	28	
11	FC Biel-Bienne	30	8	12	10	45	51	−6	28	
12	FC Laufen	30	8	12	10	38	47	−9	28	
13	FC Monthey	30	7	10	13	34	43	−9	24	To relegation play-out
14	FC Fribourg	30	8	8	14	38	51	−13	24	To relegation play-out
15	FC Nordstern Basel	30	7	9	14	38	60	−22	23	Relegation to 1984–85 Swiss 1. Liga
16	FC Red Star Zürich	30	8	4	18	48	64	−16	20	Relegation to 1984–85 Swiss 1. Liga

Source: rsssf
Rules for classification: 1) Points; 2) Goal difference within the league, but decider play-off for qualifiers;

=== Play-out against relegation ===
The decider was played on 15 June in Olympique de la Pontaise, Lausanne.

Team 1	Score	Team 2
FC Monthey	1–1 a.e.t. 4–3 pen.	FC Fribourg

FC Monthey win after penalty shoot-out and remain in division. FC Fribourg are relegated to 1984–85 Swiss 1. Liga.

== 1. Liga ==
=== Group 1 ===
Pos	Team	Pld	W	D	L	GF	GA	GD	Pts	Qualification or relegation
1	Etoile Carouge FC	26	16	5	5	58	25	+33	37	Play-off to Nationalliga B
2	Yverdon-Sport FC	26	16	4	6	61	34	+27	36	Play-off to Nationalliga B
3	FC Leytron	26	13	9	4	54	34	+20	35	
4	FC Montreux-Sports	26	13	6	7	48	39	+9	32	
5	ES FC Malley	26	11	7	8	54	42	+12	29	
6	FC Renens	26	10	7	9	36	40	−4	27	
7	FC Saint-Jean GE	26	10	6	10	53	51	+2	26	
8	FC Stade Lausanne	26	9	7	10	34	39	−5	25	
9	FC Fétigny	26	9	6	11	39	44	−5	24	
10	FC Savièse	26	12	0	14	54	62	−8	24	
11	FC Stade Payerne	26	8	8	10	40	49	−9	24	
12	FC Raron	26	7	6	13	28	39	−11	20	Play-out against relegation
13	FC Boudry	26	6	5	15	28	52	−24	17	Relegation to 2. Liga Interregional
14	FC Stade Nyonnais	26	3	2	21	33	70	−37	8	Relegation to 2. Liga Interregional

Source: RSSSF
Rules for classification: 1) Points; 2) Goal difference within the league, but decider play-off for qualifiers.

=== Group 2 ===
Pos	Team	Pld	W	D	L	GF	GA	GD	Pts	Qualification or relegation
1	FC Köniz	26	16	5	5	44	28	+16	37	Play-off to Nationalliga B
2	FC Breitenbach	26	14	3	9	45	36	+9	31	Play-off to Nationalliga B
3	FC Concordia Basel	26	12	6	8	35	28	+7	30	
4	FC Lengnau	26	9	11	6	42	34	+8	29	
5	SR Delémont	26	10	8	8	44	36	+8	28	
6	US Boncourt	26	9	8	9	40	31	+9	26	
7	FC Bern	26	9	8	9	37	43	−6	26	
8	BSC Old Boys	26	9	7	10	35	30	+5	25	
9	SC Burgdorf	26	8	9	9	39	37	+2	25	
10	FC Thun	26	8	9	9	48	48	0	25	
11	FC Le Locle	26	8	9	9	41	42	−1	25	
12	FC Solothurn	26	9	7	10	40	50	−10	25	Play-out against relegation
13	FC Allschwil	26	7	7	12	32	45	−13	21	Relegation to 2. Liga Interregional
14	FC Aurore Bienne	26	3	5	18	18	52	−34	11	Relegation to 2. Liga Interregional

Source: RSSSF
Rules for classification: 1) Points; 2) Goal difference within the league, but decider play-off for qualifiers.

=== Group 3 ===
Pos	Team	Pld	W	D	L	GF	GA	GD	Pts	Qualification or relegation
1	SC Kriens	26	15	7	4	70	29	+41	37	Play-off to Nationalliga B
2	FC Zug	26	14	9	3	58	22	+36	37	Play-off to Nationalliga B
3	FC Olten	26	12	9	5	42	30	+12	33	
4	FC Suhr	26	12	7	7	43	32	+11	31	
5	FC Emmenbrücke	26	12	6	8	44	39	+5	30	
6	FC Klus-Balsthal	26	10	9	7	42	39	+3	29	
7	FC Bremgarten	26	11	5	10	41	49	−8	27	
8	FC Ibach	26	6	11	9	32	33	−1	23	
9	SC Reiden	26	7	9	10	29	38	−9	23	
10	FC Sursee	26	8	7	11	39	50	−11	23	
11	SC Buochs	26	5	12	9	28	33	−5	22	
12	FC Brugg	26	8	6	12	27	47	−20	22	Play-out against relegation
13	FC Emmen	26	7	4	15	42	52	−10	18	Relegation to 2. Liga Interregional
14	FC Oberentfelden	26	2	5	19	19	63	−44	9	Relegation to 2. Liga Interregional

Source: RSSSF
Rules for classification: 1) Points; 2) Goal difference within the league, but decider play-off for qualifiers.

=== Group 4 ===
Pos	Team	Pld	W	D	L	GF	GA	GD	Pts	Qualification or relegation
1	FC Schaffhausen	26	18	5	3	60	25	+35	41	Play-off to Nationalliga B
2	FC Vaduz	26	15	5	6	54	36	+18	35	Play-off to Nationalliga B
3	FC Kreuzlingen	26	14	5	7	54	42	+12	33	
4	FC Rüti	26	13	7	6	33	21	+12	33	
5	FC Brüttisellen	26	12	8	6	38	24	+14	32	
6	FC Altstätten (St. Gallen)	26	11	4	11	55	52	+3	26	
7	FC Dübendorf	26	10	6	10	35	35	0	26	
8	FC Einsiedeln	26	11	4	11	45	51	−6	26	
9	FC Frauenfeld	26	9	6	11	40	37	+3	24	
10	FC Turicum	26	6	9	11	42	55	−13	21	
11	FC Küsnacht	26	6	6	14	20	39	−19	18	
12	FC Rorschach	26	5	8	13	35	55	−20	18	Play-out against relegation
13	FC Balzers	26	6	5	15	25	42	−17	17	Relegation to 2. Liga Interregional
14	FC Uzwil	26	4	6	16	33	56	−23	14	Relegation to 2. Liga Interregional

Source: RSSSF
Rules for classification: 1) Points; 2) Goal difference within the league, but decider play-off for qualifiers.

=== Promotion play-off ===
==== Qualification round ====
Team 1	Score	Team 2
SC Kriens	2–3	Yverdon-Sport FC
Yverdon-Sport FC	1–1	SC Kriens

Yverdon-Sport FC win 4–3 on aggregate and continue to the finals.

Team 1	Score	Team 2
FC Köniz	2–3	FC Zug
FC Zug	3–2	FC Köniz

FC Zug win 6–4 on aggregate and continue to the finals.

Team 1	Score	Team 2
FC Breitenbach	1–0	FC Schaffhausen
FC Schaffhausen	7–0	FC Breitenbach

FC Schaffhausen win 7–1 on aggregate and continue to the finals.

Team 1	Score	Team 2
FC Vaduz	1–2	Etoile Carouge FC
Etoile Carouge FC	1–0	FC Vaduz

Etoile Carouge FC win 3–1 on aggregate and continue to the finals.

==== Final round ====
Team 1	Score	Team 2
FC Schaffhausen	2–1	FC Zug
FC Zug	1–3	FC Schaffhausen

FC Schaffhausen win 5–2 on aggregate and are promoted to 1984–85 Nationalliga B.

Team 1	Score	Team 2
Etoile Carouge FC	1–0	Yverdon-Sport FC
Yverdon-Sport FC	2–1	Etoile Carouge FC

Etoile Carouge FC win on away goals and are promoted to 1984–85 Nationalliga B.

==== Decider for third place ====
Team 1	Score	Team 2
FC Zug	1–1	Yverdon-Sport FC
Yverdon-Sport FC	2–1 a.e.t.	FC Zug

Yverdon-Sport FC win 3–2 on aggregate and are promoted to 1984–85 Nationalliga B. FC Zug remain in 1. Liga.

==== Decider for 1. Liga championship ====
Team 1	Score	Team 2
FC Schaffhausen	1–0	Etoile Carouge FC

FC Schaffhausen win and are 1. Liga champions.

=== Relegation play-out ===
==== First round ====
Team 1	Score	Team 2
FC Raron	1–6	FC Solothurn

FC Raron continue to the final.

Team 1	Score	Team 2
FC Brugg	1–0	FC Rorschach

FC Rorschach continue to the final.

==== Final round ====
Team 1	Score	Team 2
FC Raron	1–1	FC Rorschach
FC Rorschach	2–0	FC Raron

FC Rorschach win 3–1 on aggregate and remain in division. FC Raron are relegated to 2. Liga.

== Swiss Cup ==
=== Early rounds ===
The routes of the finalists to the final were:

- Round 3: Martigny-Servette 1:2. Charmey-Lausanne 1:13.
- Round 4: La Chaux-de-Fonds-Servette 1:3. YB-Lausanne 2:4.
- Round 5: Servette-Sion 4:2. Grenchen-Lausanne 0:2.
- Quarter-finals: Servette-Chiasso 5:0. Lausanne-Zürich 3:2 a.e.t.
- Semi-finals: Aarau-Servette 0:0 a.e.t. Replay: Servette-Aarau 1:0. Lausanne-St. Gallen 1:0.

=== Final ===
Whit Monday 11 June 1984

Servette	1–0 (a.e.t.)	Lausanne-Sport
Geiger	Report

Wankdorf Stadium, Bern
Attendance: 38,000
Referee: (Switzerland) Ulrich Nyffenegger

== Swiss Clubs in Europe ==
- Grasshopper Club as 1982–83 Nationalliga A champions: 1983–84 European Cup
- Servette as 1982–83 Swiss Cup finalist: 1983–84 Cup Winners' Cup
- St. Gallen: as league third placed team: 1983–84 UEFA Cup and entered 1983 Intertoto Cup
- Zürich: as league fourth placed team: 1983–84 UEFA Cup and entered 1983 Intertoto Cup
- Luzern: entered 1983 Intertoto Cup
- Young Boys: entered 1983 Intertoto Cup

=== Grasshopper Club ===
==== European Cup ====
===== First round =====
14 September 1983 First leg	Dinamo Minsk (Soviet Union)	1–0	(Switzerland) Grasshopper	Dinamo Stadium, Minsk
	Kurnenin 18'	Report		Attendance: 50,000; Referee: Pietro D'Elia (Italy)

28 September 1983 Second leg	Grasshopper (Switzerland)	2–2	(Soviet Union) Dinamo Minsk	Hardturm, Zürich
	Ponte 21', 49'	Report	Kondratiev 31'; Sokol 84'	Attendance: 16,000; Referee: Brian McGinlay (Scotland)

Dinamo Minsk won 3–2 on aggregate.

=== Servertte ===
==== Cup Winners' Cup ====
===== First round =====
14 September 1983 First leg	Servette (Switzerland)	4–0	(Luxembourg) Avenir Beggen	Charmilles Stadium, Geneva
	Schnyder 25'; Brigger 52'; Elia 55'; Barberis 75'	Report		Attendance: 5,130; Referee: Georges Konrath (France)

27 September 1983 Second leg	Avenir Beggen (Luxembourg)	1–5	(Switzerland) Servette	Stade rue Henri Dunant, Luxembourg City
	Dresch 51'	Report	Elia 33'; Brigger 43', 72'; Castella 62'; Geiger 89'	Attendance: 516; Referee: Louis Delsemme (Belgium)

Servette won 9–1 on aggregate.

===== Second =====
19 October 1983 First leg	Shakhtar Donetsk (Soviet Union)	1–0	(Switzerland) Servette	Shakhtar Stadium, Donetsk
18:00	Hrachov 85'	Report		Attendance: 37,450; Referee: Arto Ravander (Finland)

1 November 1983 Second leg	Servette (Switzerland)	1–2	(Soviet Union) Shakhtar Donetsk	Charmilles Stadium, Geneva
20:00	Brigger 88'	Report	Varnavskyi 58', 61'	Attendance: 14,400; Referee: Alder dos Santos (Portugal)

Shakhtar Donetsk won 3–1 on aggregate.

=== St. Gallen ===
==== UEFA Cup ====
===== First round =====
14 September 1983 First leg	Radnički Niš (Socialist Federal Republic of Yugoslavia)	3–0	(Switzerland) St. Gallen	Stadion Čair, Niš
20:00	Beganović 4' (pen.); Stojković 37'; Rinčić 65'	Report		Attendance: 21,000; Referee: Ioan Igna (Romania)

27 September 1983 Second leg	St. Gallen (Switzerland)	1–2	(Socialist Federal Republic of Yugoslavia) Radnički Niš	Espenmoos, St. Gallen
17:30	Ritter 65'	Report	Mitošević 62'; Aleksić 82'	Attendance: 10,200; Referee: Emilio Soriano Aladrén (Spain)

Radnički Niš won 5–1 on aggregate.

==== Intertoto Cup ====
===== Group 3 =====
Pos	Team	Pld	W	D	L	GF	GA	GD	Pts	PSZ	BRE	MAL	STG
1	(Poland) Pogoń Szczecin	6	3	2	1	10	10	0	8	—	2–1	2–0	1–1
2	(West Germany) Werder Bremen	6	3	1	2	12	8	+4	7	4–0	—	1–1	3–2
3	(Sweden) Malmö FF	6	2	1	3	7	9	−2	5	1–2	2–1	—	2–0
4	(Switzerland) St. Gallen	6	1	2	3	10	12	−2	4	3–3	1–2	3–1	—

Source: mogiel.net
Rules for classification: 1) Points; 2) Goal difference; 3) Goals scored; 4) Head-to-head points; 5) Away goals scored; 6) Draw.

=== Zürich ===
==== UEFA Cup ====
===== First round =====
14 September 1983 First leg	FC Zürich (Switzerland)	1–4	(Belgium) Royal Antwerp	Letzigrund, Zürich
20:00	Baur 28'	Report	Pétursson 13', 17', 67'; Cnops 89'	Attendance: 6,350; Referee: Miklós Nagy (Hungary)

27 September 1983 Second leg	Royal Antwerp (Belgium)	4–2	(Switzerland) FC Zürich	Bosuilstadion, Antwerp
20:00	Fazekas 50' (pen.), 84'; Petrović 74'; Van Der Linden 76'	Report	Landolt 69'; Rufer 80'	Attendance: 12,500; Referee: Howard King (Wales)

Royal Antwerp won 8–3 on aggregate.

==== Intertoto Cup ====
===== Group 1 =====
Matches

2 July 1983 Round 1	Fortuna Düsseldorf (West Germany)	2–2	(Switzerland) Zürich	Ratingen
	Wenzel 27' (1:1) (Baur) 48' (o.g.)	FCZ summary	26' (0:1) Alliata; 75' (pen.) Zappa; (yellow card) Schönenberger; (yellow card) Stoll	Attendance: 4,000; Referee: (West Germany) Ahlenfelder

7 July 1983 Round 2	Twente (Netherlands)	1–1	(Switzerland) Zürich	Diekman Stadion, Enschede
	Ashcroft 87' (1:1)	FCZ summary Twente report	77' (0:1) Elsener	Attendance: 4,000; Referee: (Netherlands) Jan Manuel

9 July 1983 Round 3	Standard Liège (Belgium)	3–0	(Switzerland) Zürich	Stade de Sclessin, Liège
	Plessers 57' (1:0); Tahamata 86' (2:0); Daerden 89' (3:0)	FCZ summary	(yellow card) Kundert	Attendance: 6,000; Referee: (Belgium) Richard Magerat

16 July 1983 Round 4	Zürich (Switzerland)	3–4	(Netherlands) Twente	Letzigrund, Zürich
	Jerković 3' (1:0); Kundert (yellow card) 7'; Zappa 28' (2:0); Bold 31' (3:1)	FCZ summary Twente report	30' (2:1) Birkedal; (yellow card) 42' Plasmans; 58' (3:2) Rutten; 77' (3:3) Roord; 83' (3:4) Plasmans	Attendance: 1,800; Referee: (Switzerland) Rudolf Renggli (Stans/Luzern)

23 July 1983 Round 5	Zürich (Switzerland)	5–2	(West Germany) Fortuna Düsseldorf	Letzigrund, Zürich
	Bold 16' (1:0); Bold 28' (2:1); Alliata 49' (3:1); Alliata 51' (4:2); Landolt 89' (5:2)	FCZ summary	24' (1:1) Bockenfeld; 51' (4:2) Eðvaldsson; (yellow card) 88' Dusend	Attendance: 1,700; Referee: (Switzerland) Franz Gächter (Aarau / Suhr)

27 July 1983 Round 6	Zürich (Switzerland)	2–1	(Belgium) Standard Liège	Letzigrund, Zürich
	Bold 48' (1:0); Schneider 79' (2:0)	FCZ summary	(yellow card) 35' Delangre; (yellow card) 36' Bosman; (yellow card) 79' Preud'homme; 87' (2:1) Wintacq	Attendance: 2,700; Referee: (Switzerland) Jakob Baumann (Schaffhausen)
Note: Standard goalkeeper Preud'homme substituted in as a field player!

Final group table

Pos	Team	Pld	W	D	L	GF	GA	GD	Pts	TWE	STA	ZÜR	DÜS
1	(Netherlands) Twente	6	4	1	1	14	10	+4	9	—	2–0	1–1	1–0
2	(Belgium) Standard Liège	6	4	0	2	13	9	+4	8	4–2	—	3–0	4–3
3	(Switzerland) Zürich	6	2	2	2	13	13	0	6	3–4	2–1	—	5–2
4	(West Germany) Fortuna Düsseldorf	6	0	1	5	9	17	−8	1	2–4	0–1	2–2	—

Source: mogiel.net
Rules for classification: 1) Points; 2) Goal difference; 3) Goals scored; 4) Head-to-head points; 5) Away goals scored; 6) Draw.

=== Luzern ===
==== Intertoto Cup ====
===== Group 4 =====
Pos	Team	Pld	W	D	L	GF	GA	GD	Pts	MNE	AGF	LUZ	STA
1	(Israel) Maccabi Netanya	6	5	0	1	17	10	+7	10	—	3–1	6–3	3–0
2	(Denmark) AGF	6	3	0	3	14	11	+3	6	1–2	—	8–3	2–1
3	(Switzerland) Luzern	6	2	1	3	12	17	−5	5	4–1	1–0	—	1–2
4	(Israel) Shimshon Tel Aviv	6	1	1	4	5	10	−5	3	1–2	1–2	0–0	—

Source: mogiel.net
Rules for classification: 1) Points; 2) Goal difference; 3) Goals scored; 4) Head-to-head points; 5) Away goals scored; 6) Draw.

=== Young Boys ===
==== Intertoto Cup ====
===== Group 2 =====
Pos	Team	Pld	W	D	L	GF	GA	GD	Pts	YB	SLP	BRØ	SLS
1	(Switzerland) Young Boys	6	4	0	2	7	6	+1	8	—	2–1	0–2	1–0
2	(Czechoslovakia) Slavia Prague	6	3	0	3	12	8	+4	6	2–1	—	3–1	5–0
3	(Denmark) Brøndby	6	2	1	3	7	8	−1	5	1–2	2–0	—	0–0
4	(Bulgaria) Slavia Sofia	6	2	1	3	5	9	−4	5	0–1	2–1	3–1	—

Source: mogiel.net
Rules for classification: 1) Points; 2) Goal difference; 3) Goals scored; 4) Head-to-head points; 5) Away goals scored; 6) Draw.

== Sources ==
- Switzerland 1983–84 at RSSSF
- Cup finals at Fussball-Schweiz
- European Competitions 1983–84 at RSSSF.com
- Intertoto history at Pawel Mogielnicki's Page
- Josef Zindel (2018). FC Basel 1893. Die ersten 125 Jahre (in German). Basel: Friedrich Reinhardt Verlag. ISBN 978-3-7245-2305-5.

Preceded by 1982–83	Seasons in Swiss football	Succeeded by 1984–85
