= 1984–85 in Swiss football =

Football in Switzerland
- Season: 1984–85

Men's football
- Nationalliga A: Servette
- Nationalliga B: FC Grenchen
- 1. Liga: Overall champions FC Zug; Group 1: FC Le Locle; Group 2: FC Lengnau; Group 3: SC Kriens; Group 4: FC Red Star Zürich
- Swiss Cup: Aarau

Women's football
- Swiss Women's Super League: SV Seebach Zürich
- Swiss Cup: FFC Bern

The following is a summary of the 1984–85 season of competitive football in Switzerland.

== Nationalliga A ==
=== Final league table ===
Pos	Team	Pld	W	D	L	GF	GA	GD	Pts	Qualification
1	Servette	30	19	8	3	71	28	+43	46	Swiss Champions qualified for 1985–86 European Cup
2	Aarau	30	16	10	4	62	43	+19	42	Swiss Cup winners qualified for 1985–86 Cup Winners' Cup and entered 1985 Intertoto Cup
3	Xamax	30	14	11	5	59	34	+25	39	Qualified for 1985–86 UEFA Cup
4	St. Gallen	30	13	11	6	66	32	+34	37	Qualified for 1985–86 UEFA Cup and entered 1985 Intertoto Cup
5	Sion	30	14	8	8	56	49	+7	36	Entered 1985 Intertoto Cup
6	Grasshopper Club	30	11	10	9	53	47	+6	32	
7	Zürich	30	11	9	10	59	52	+7	31	
8	Basel	30	11	9	10	46	49	−3	31	
9	Young Boys	30	10	10	10	42	45	−3	30	Entered 1985 Intertoto Cup
10	Lausanne-Sport	30	10	9	11	50	57	−7	29	
11	Wettingen	30	7	12	11	31	35	−4	26	
12	Luzern	30	9	8	13	33	53	−20	26	
13	Vevey-Sports	30	9	6	15	40	47	−7	24	
14	La Chaux-de-Fonds	30	6	12	12	41	54	−13	24	
15	SC Zug	30	4	6	20	27	71	−44	14	Relegated to 1985–86 Nationalliga B
16	Winterthur	30	4	5	21	32	72	−40	13	Relegated to 1985–86 Nationalliga B

Source: rsssf.com
Rules for classification: 1) Points; 2) Goal difference; 3) Goals scored; 4) Head-to-head points; 5) Away goals scored; 6) Draw.

== Nationalliga B ==
=== Final league table ===
Pos	Team	Pld	W	D	L	GF	GA	GD	Pts	Qualification
1	FC Grenchen	30	15	10	5	55	28	+27	40	Promotion to 1985–86 Nationalliga A
2	FC Baden	30	17	6	7	61	41	+20	40	Promotion to 1985–86 Nationalliga A
3	Etoile Carouge FC	30	16	5	9	58	40	+18	37	
4	FC Biel-Bienne	30	14	9	7	58	43	+15	37	
5	FC Schaffhausen	30	13	9	8	47	41	+6	35	
6	Lugano	30	13	8	9	53	36	+17	34	
7	FC Bulle	30	13	8	9	46	38	+8	34	
8	FC Martigny-Sports	30	12	9	9	61	47	+14	33	
9	FC Locarno	30	10	11	9	42	37	+5	31	
10	CS Chênois	30	12	7	11	45	44	+1	31	
11	FC Chiasso	30	12	5	13	44	42	+2	29	
12	AC Bellinzona	30	9	11	10	47	52	−5	29	
13	FC Laufen	30	9	11	10	41	48	−7	29	
14	Mendrisiostar	30	11	6	13	39	37	+2	28	Relegation to 1985–86 1. Liga
15	Yverdon-Sport FC	30	3	3	24	29	84	−55	9	Relegation to 1985–86 1. Liga
16	FC Monthey	30	1	2	27	30	98	−68	4	Relegation to 1985–86 1. Liga

Source: rsssf.com
Rules for classification: 1) Points; 2) Goal difference; 3) Goals scored; 4) Head-to-head points; 5) Away goals scored; 6) Draw.

== 1. Liga ==
=== Group 1 ===
Pos	Team	Pld	W	D	L	GF	GA	GD	Pts	Qualification or relegation
1	FC Le Locle	26	16	7	3	69	36	+33	39	Play-off to Nationalliga B
2	FC Renens	26	13	7	6	56	38	+18	33	Play-off to Nationalliga B
3	FC Fribourg	26	12	9	5	47	32	+15	33	
4	FC Stade Lausanne	26	14	3	9	51	36	+15	31	
5	FC Saint-Jean GE	26	10	9	7	40	33	+7	29	
6	FC Montreux-Sports	26	8	11	7	35	35	0	27	
7	FC Stade Payerne	26	6	13	7	25	28	−3	25	
8	ES FC Malley	26	8	9	9	37	42	−5	25	
9	FC Savièse	26	9	6	11	44	44	0	24	
10	FC Vernier	26	7	10	9	42	44	−2	24	
11	FC Leytron	26	8	8	10	40	44	−4	24	
12	FC Echallens	26	7	10	9	32	44	−12	24	Play-out against relegation
13	FC Fétigny	26	3	10	13	25	51	−26	16	Relegation to 2. Liga Interregional
14	FC Lalden	26	3	4	19	22	58	−36	10	Relegation to 2. Liga Interregional

Source: RSSSF
Rules for classification: 1) Points; 2) Goal difference within the league, but decider play-off for qualifiers.

=== Group 2 ===
Pos	Team	Pld	W	D	L	GF	GA	GD	Pts	Qualification or relegation
1	FC Lengnau	26	17	4	5	68	32	+36	38	Play-off to Nationalliga B
2	BSC Old Boys	26	13	7	6	53	35	+18	33	To decider for second place
3	FC Concordia Basel	26	13	7	6	49	38	+11	33	To decider for second place
4	SR Delémont	26	11	7	8	42	39	+3	29	
5	FC Köniz	26	9	10	7	37	38	−1	28	
6	FC Langenthal	26	11	4	11	49	50	−1	26	
7	SC Burgdorf	26	11	4	11	32	39	−7	26	
8	FC Breitenbach	26	9	7	10	41	45	−4	25	
9	FC Bern	26	9	7	10	34	40	−6	25	
10	FC Nordstern Basel	26	9	6	11	35	40	−5	24	
11	FC Solothurn	26	7	9	10	43	47	−4	23	
12	FC Thun	26	7	8	11	41	49	−8	22	Play-out against relegation
13	US Boncourt	26	6	9	11	34	39	−5	21	Relegation to 2. Liga Interregional
14	FC Rapid Ostermundigen	26	5	1	20	22	49	−27	11	Relegation to 2. Liga Interregional

Source: RSSSF
Rules for classification: 1) Points; 2) Goal difference within the league, but decider play-off for qualifiers.

==== Decider for second position ====
The decider was played on 21 May 1985 in the Stadion Rankhof in Basel.

Team 1	Score	Team 2
BSC Old Boys	1–1 a.e.t. 4–2 Pen.	FC Concordia Basel

BSC Old Boys win after penalty shoot-out and advance to play-offs.

=== Group 3 ===
Pos	Team	Pld	W	D	L	GF	GA	GD	Pts	Qualification or relegation
1	SC Kriens	26	16	8	2	54	26	+28	40	Play-off to Nationalliga B
2	FC Zug	26	16	7	3	50	23	+27	39	Play-off to Nationalliga B
3	FC Suhr	26	11	9	6	51	36	+15	31	
4	FC Sursee	26	10	10	6	56	46	+10	30	
5	FC Olten	26	11	7	8	46	28	+18	29	
6	FC Ibach	26	8	10	8	40	42	−2	26	
7	FC Klus-Balsthal	26	9	8	9	32	38	−6	26	
8	FC Emmenbrücke	26	7	11	8	39	34	+5	25	
9	SC Buochs	26	8	7	11	45	41	+4	23	
10	FC Ascona	26	5	13	8	25	29	−4	23	
11	SC Reiden	26	7	8	11	28	42	−14	22	
12	FC Brugg	26	4	10	12	28	49	−21	18	Play-out against relegation
13	FC Littau	26	7	4	15	32	62	−30	18	Relegation to 2. Liga Interregional
14	FC Bremgarten	26	4	6	16	28	58	−30	14	Relegation to 2. Liga Interregional

Source: RSSSF
Rules for classification: 1) Points; 2) Goal difference within the league, but decider play-off for qualifiers.

=== Group 4 ===
Pos	Team	Pld	W	D	L	GF	GA	GD	Pts	Qualification or relegation
1	FC Red Star Zürich	26	18	8	0	51	15	+36	44	Play-off to Nationalliga B
2	FC Stäfa	26	11	11	4	36	30	+6	33	Play-off to Nationalliga B
3	FC Gossau	26	13	6	7	46	31	+15	32	
4	FC Altstätten (St. Gallen)	26	11	9	6	52	34	+18	31	
5	FC Dübendorf	26	8	11	7	31	32	−1	27	
6	FC Brüttisellen	26	10	6	10	41	38	+3	26	
7	FC Vaduz	26	7	10	9	30	36	−6	24	
8	FC Rorschach	26	7	10	9	25	31	−6	24	
9	FC Frauenfeld	26	6	11	9	29	36	−7	23	
10	FC Rüti	26	8	6	12	30	35	−5	22	
11	FC Küsnacht	26	7	8	11	20	33	−13	22	
12	FC Einsiedeln	26	7	6	13	42	49	−7	20	Play-out against relegation
13	FC Kreuzlingen	26	5	9	12	31	44	−13	19	Relegation to 2. Liga Interregional
14	FC Turicum	26	3	11	12	25	45	−20	17	Relegation to 2. Liga Interregional

Source: RSSSF
Rules for classification: 1) Points; 2) Goal difference within the league, but decider play-off for qualifiers.

=== Promotion play-off ===
==== Qualification round ====
Team 1	Score	Team 2
FC Renens	3–2	FC Lengnau
FC Lengnau	0–2	FC Renens

FC Renens win 5–2 on aggregate and continue to the finals.

Team 1	Score	Team 2
FC Red Star Zürich	1–3	FC Zug
FC Zug	1–2	FC Red Star Zürich

FC Zug win 4–3 on aggregate and continue to the finals.

Team 1	Score	Team 2
BSC Old Boys	1–0	FC Le Locle
FC Le Locle	4–0	BSC Old Boys

FC Le Locle win 4–1 on aggregate and continue to the finals.

Team 1	Score	Team 2
SC Kriens	2–1	FC Stäfa
FC Stäfa	1–2	SC Kriens
SC Kriens	1–2	FC Stäfa

3–3 on aggregate. FC Stäfa win the replay and continue to the finals.

==== Semi-finals ====
Team 1	Score	Team 2
FC Le Locle	3–1	FC Stäfa
FC Stäfa	2–1	FC Le Locle

FC Le Locle win 4–3 on aggregate and are promoted to 1985–86 Nationalliga B.

Team 1	Score	Team 2
FC Zug	1–0	FC Renens
FC Renens	1–0	FC Zug
FC Zug	3–0	FC Renens

1–1 on aggregate. FC Zug the replay and are promoted to 1985–86 Nationalliga B.

==== Decider for third place ====
Team 1	Score	Team 2
FC Renens	4–0	FC Stäfa
FC Stäfa	0–4	FC Renens

FC Renens win 8–0 on aggregate and are promoted to 1985–86 Nationalliga B. FC Stäfa remain in 1. Liga.

==== Decider for 1. Liga championship ====
Team 1	Score	Team 2
FC Le Locle	2–5	FC Zug

FC Zug win and are declaied 1. Liga champions.

=== Relegation play-out ===
==== First round ====
Team 1	Score	Team 2
FC Echallens	3–0	FC Thun

FC Thun continue to the play-out final.

Team 1	Score	Team 2
FC Brugg	1–5	FC Einsiedeln

FC Brugg continue to the play-out final.

==== Final round ====
Team 1	Score	Team 2
FC Brugg	3–2	FC Thun
FC Thun	2–1	FC Brugg

FC Thun win and FC Brugg are relegated to 2. Liga.

== Swiss Cup ==
=== Early rounds ===
The routes of the finalists to the final were:

- Round 3: Baden-Aarau 1:2. Fribourg-Xamax 1:5.
- Round 4: Kriens-Aarau 0:1. Le Locle-Xamax 0:4.
- Round 5: YB-Aarau 2:3 a.e.t. Schaffhausen-Xamax 0:4.
- Quarter-finals: Aarau-Grenchen 2:0. Xamax-Vevey-Sports 4:1.
- Semi-finals: Aarau-Servette 3:1. Xamax-Lausanne 3:2.

=== Final ===
Whit Monday 27 May 1985

Aarau	1–0	Xamax
Iselin 86'	Report

Wankdorf Stadium, Bern
Attendance: 32,000
Referee: (Switzerland) Willi Jaus

Note: Fair game no bookings, yellow cards

== Swiss Clubs in Europe ==
- Grasshopper Club as 1983–84 Nationalliga A champions: 1984–85 European Cup
- Servette as 1983–84 Swiss Cup winners: 1984–85 Cup Winners' Cup
- Sion: as league third placed team: 1984–85 UEFA Cup
- Xamax: as league fourth placed team: 1984–85 UEFA Cup
- St. Gallen: entered 1984 Intertoto Cup
- Wettingen: entered 1984 Intertoto Cup
- Zürich: entered 1984 Intertoto Cup
- Luzern: entered 1984 Intertoto Cup

=== Grasshopper Club ===
==== European Cup ====
===== First round =====
19 September 1984 First leg	Grasshopper Club (Switzerland)	3–1	(Hungary) Budapesti Honvéd	Hardturm, Zürich
20:00	Jara 31'; Müller 68', 72'	Report	Dajka 30'	Attendance: 4,467; Referee: José Pes Pérez (Spain)

3 October 1984 Second leg	Budapesti Honvéd (Hungary)	2–1	(Switzerland) Grasshopper Club	Szent Imre herceg útjai Stadion, Budapest
14:00	Dajka 44'; Varga 52' (pen.)	Report	Ponte 13'	Attendance: 6,483; Referee: Franz Wöhrer (Austria)

Grasshopper Club won 4–3 on aggregate.

===== Second round =====
24 October 1984 First leg	Juventus (Italy)	2–0	(Switzerland) Grasshopper Club	Stadio Comunale, Turin
20:30	Vignola 26'; Rossi 28'	Report		Attendance: 39,804; Referee: Bob Valentine (Scotland)

7 November 1984 Second leg	Grasshopper Club (Switzerland)	2–4	(Italy) Juventus	Letzigrund, Zürich
20:00	Koller 30'; Schällibaum 71'	Report	Briaschi 21'; Vignola 40'; Platini 61', 85' (pen.)	Attendance: 25,000; Referee: Erik Fredriksson (Sweden)

Juventus won 6–2 on aggregate.

=== Servette ===
==== Cup Winners' Cup ====
===== First round =====
19 September 1984 First leg	APOEL (Cyprus)	0–3	(Switzerland) Servette	Makario Stadio, Nicosia
		Report	Decastel 40'; Brigger 79'; Favre 84'	Attendance: 7,779; Referee: Mircea Neşu (Romania)

3 October 1984 Second leg	Servette (Switzerland)	3–1	(Cyprus) APOEL	Stade des Charmilles, Geneva
	Kok 6'; Barberis 14'; Brigger 31'	Report	Moores 82'	Attendance: 2,909; Referee: Paul Rion (Luxembourg)

Servette won 6–1 on aggregate.

===== Second round =====
24 October 1984 First leg	AEL (Greece)	2–1	(Switzerland) Servette	Alkazar, Larissa
	Patsiavouras 53'; Kmiecik 65' (pen.)	Report	Kok 13'	Attendance: 11,620; Referee: Bogdan Dochev (Bulgaria)

7 November 1984 Second leg	Servette (Switzerland)	0–1	(Greece) AEL	Stade des Charmilles, Geneva
		Report	Valaoras 60'	Attendance: 12,500; Referee: Vítor Fernandes (Portugal)

AEL won 3–1 on aggregate.

=== Sion ===
==== UEFA Cup ====
===== First round =====
19 September 1984 First leg	Sion (Switzerland)	1–0	(Spain) Atlético Madrid	Stade de Tourbillon, Sion
20:15	Cina 75'	UEFA report		Attendance: 7,500; Referee: Aron Schmidhuber (West Germany)

3 October 1984 Second leg	Atlético Madrid (Spain)	2–3	(Switzerland) Sion	Estadio Vicente Calderón, Madrid
21:00	Sánchez 16' (pen.); Pedraza 38'	UEFA report	Marina 1' (o.g.); Cina 4', 14'	Attendance: 25,000; Referee: Alan Robinson (England)

Sion won 4–2 on aggregate.

===== Second round =====
24 October 1984 First leg	Željezničar (Socialist Federal Republic of Yugoslavia)	2–1	(Switzerland) Sion	Stadion Grbavica, Sarajevo
17:00	Bahtić 25', 84'	UEFA report	Šabanadžović 75' (o.g.)	Attendance: 22,000; Referee: Yusuf Namoğlu (Turkey)

7 November 1984 Second leg	Sion (Switzerland)	1–1	(Socialist Federal Republic of Yugoslavia) Željezničar	Stade de Tourbillon, Sion
20:00	Cina 88'	UEFA report	Ćurić 76'	Attendance: 9,000; Referee: Gerard Geurds (Netherlands)

Željezničar won 3–2 on aggregate.

=== Xamax ===
==== UEFA Cup ====
===== First round =====
19 September 1984 First leg	Olympiacos (Greece)	1–0	(Switzerland) Neuchâtel Xamax	O.A.K.A "Spyros Louis", Athens
19:30	Mitropoulos 2'	UEFA report		Attendance: 61,978; Referee: Vladimir Kuznetsov (Soviet Union)

3 October 1984 Second leg	Neuchâtel Xamax (Switzerland)	2–2	(Greece) Olympiacos	Stade de la Maladière, Neuchâtel
20:00	Lüthi 25'; Zaugg 71'	UEFA report	Anastopoulos 53', 89'	Attendance: 11,200; Referee: Adolf Prokop (East Germany)

Olympiacos won 3–2 on aggregate.

=== St. Gallen ===
==== Intertoto Cup ====
===== Group 1 =====
Pos	Team	Pld	W	D	L	GF	GA	GD	Pts	B05	STG	MÖN	LYN
1	(Czechoslovakia) Bohemians Prague	6	5	0	1	20	7	+13	10	—	5–0	4–2	5–1
2	(Switzerland) St. Gallen	6	2	2	2	8	13	−5	6	3–2	—	1–2	2–1
3	(West Germany) Borussia Mönchengladbach	6	2	1	3	11	12	−1	5	0–2	1–1	—	5–0
4	(Denmark) Lyngby	6	1	1	4	8	15	−7	3	1–2	1–1	4–0	—

Source: mogiel.net
Rules for classification: 1) Points; 2) Goal difference; 3) Head-to-head points; 4) Head-to-head goals; 5) Draw.

=== Wettingen ===
==== Intertoto Cup ====
===== Group 8 =====
Pos	Team	Pld	W	D	L	GF	GA	GD	Pts	MNE	ADM	WET	BEI
1	(Israel) Maccabi Netanya	6	4	1	1	13	13	0	9	—	2–1	2–2	4–3
2	(Austria) Admira/Wacker Wien	6	3	2	1	15	6	+9	8	6–0	—	3–1	2–2
3	(Switzerland) Wettingen	6	2	2	2	8	9	−1	6	0–3	1–1	—	1–0
4	(Israel) Beitar Jerusalem	6	0	1	5	6	14	−8	1	1–2	0–2	0–3	—

Source: mogiel.net
Rules for classification: 1) Points; 2) Goal difference; 3) Head-to-head points; 4) Head-to-head goals; 5) Draw.

=== Zürich ===
==== Intertoto Cup ====
===== Group 9 =====
Matches

30 June 1984 Round 1	Spartak Trnava (Czechoslovakia)	2–0	(Switzerland) Zürich	Trnava
	Fijalka 25' (1:0); Cabánik 56' (2:0)	FCZ summary		Attendance: 4,000; Referee: (Czechoslovakia) Valach

7 July 1984 Round 2	Austria Klagenfurt	1–2	(Switzerland) Zürich	Wörthersee Stadion, Klagenfurt
	Bürgler 19' (pen. 1:1)	FCZ summary	15' (0:1) Schneider; 85' (1:2) Alliata; (yellow card) Baur; (yellow card) Lüdi	Attendance: 1,200; Referee: (Austria) Gerhard Kapl

14 July 1984 Round 3	Ferencváros (Hungary)	3–0	(Switzerland) Zürich	Üllői úti Stadion, Budapest
	Rab 35' (1:0); Zsinka 64' (2:0); Rubold 79' (3:0)	FCZ summary	(yellow card) Jerković	Attendance: 10,000; Referee: (Hungary) László Kőrös

21 July 1984 Round 4	Zürich (Switzerland)	1–0	(Hungary) Ferencváros	Linthstrasse, Tuggen
	Rufer 80' (1:0)	FCZ summary	(yellow card) 54' Zsivótzky	Attendance: 1,600; Referee: (Switzerland) Franz Gächter (Aarau, Suhr, Aargau)
Note: Inauguration of the Linthstrasse sports field.

28 July 1984 Round 5	Zürich (Switzerland)	2–0	Austria Klagenfurt	Sportplatz Rüti, Uzwil
	Schneider 63' (1:0); Alliata 67' (2:0); Landolt (yellow card)	FCZ summary	63′ D. Hrstic; (yellow card) P. Hrstic	Attendance: 1,100; Referee: (Switzerland) Philippe Mercier (Pully)

4 August 1984 Round 6	Zürich (Switzerland)	2–1	(Czechoslovakia) Spartak Trnava	Löhracker, Aadorf
	Jerković 44' (1:0); Schneider 64' (2:1)	FCZ summary	59' (1:1) Dian	Attendance: 950; Referee: (Switzerland) Bruno Galler (Kirchdorf, Bern)
Note: Game as part of the 50th anniversary celebrations of SC Aadorf

Table

Pos	Team	Pld	W	D	L	GF	GA	GD	Pts	ZÜR	TRV	FER	KLA
1	(Switzerland) Zürich	6	4	0	2	7	7	0	8	—	2–1	1–0	2–0
2	(Czechoslovakia) Spartak Trnava	6	3	1	2	12	9	+3	7	2–0	—	1–1	3–1
3	(Hungary) Ferencváros	6	2	2	2	9	6	+3	6	3–0	3–1	—	0–0
4	Austria Klagenfurt	6	1	1	4	7	13	−6	3	1–2	2–4	3–2	—

Source: mogiel.net
Rules for classification: 1) Points; 2) Goal difference; 3) Head-to-head points; 4) Head-to-head goals; 5) Draw.

=== Luzern ===
==== Intertoto Cup ====
===== Group 6 =====
Pos	Team	Pld	W	D	L	GF	GA	GD	Pts	MAL	KMS	STU	LUZ
1	(Sweden) Malmö FF	6	4	1	1	10	4	+6	9	—	3–0	1–0	1–0
2	(East Germany) Karl-Marx-Stadt	6	3	2	1	12	8	+4	8	2–1	—	2–1	5–0
3	(Austria) Sturm Graz	6	1	2	3	6	8	−2	4	2–2	1–1	—	1–0
4	(Switzerland) Luzern	6	1	1	4	4	12	−8	3	0–2	2–2	2–1	—

Source: mogiel.net
Rules for classification: 1) Points; 2) Goal difference; 3) Head-to-head points; 4) Head-to-head goals; 5) Draw.

== Sources ==
- Switzerland 1984–85 at RSSSF
- Cup finals at Fussball-Schweiz
- European Competitions 1984–85 at RSSSF.com
- Intertoto history at Pawel Mogielnicki's Page
- Josef Zindel (2018). FC Basel 1893. Die ersten 125 Jahre (in German). Basel: Friedrich Reinhardt Verlag. ISBN 978-3-7245-2305-5.

Preceded by 1983–84	Seasons in Swiss football	Succeeded by 1985–86
