= 1982–83 in Swiss football =

Football in Switzerland
- Season: 1982–83

Men's football
- Nationalliga A: Grasshopper Club
- Nationalliga B: FC La Chaux-de-Fonds
- 1. Liga: 1. Liga champion: FC Martigny-Sports; Group 1: Etoile Carouge FC; Group 2: BSC Old Boys; Group 3: SC Kriens; Group 4: FC Altstätten
- Swiss Cup: Grasshopper Club

Women's football
- Swiss Women's Super League: SV Seebach Zürich
- Swiss Cup: DFC Bern

The following is a summary of the 1982–83 season of competitive football in Switzerland.

== Nationalliga A ==
=== League table ===
Pos	Team	Pld	W	D	L	GF	GA	GD	Pts	Qualification
1	Grasshopper Club	30	24	1	5	86	29	+57	49	Swiss champions, qualified for 1983–84 European Cup
2	Servette	30	22	4	4	65	24	+41	48	Swiss Cup finalist, qualified for 1983–84 Cup Winners' Cup
3	St. Gallen	30	17	6	7	61	31	+30	40	qualified for 1983–84 UEFA Cup and entered 1983 Intertoto Cup
4	Zürich	30	17	4	9	55	39	+16	38	qualified for 1983–84 UEFA Cup and entered 1983 Intertoto Cup
5	Lausanne-Sport	30	15	7	8	51	28	+23	37	
6	Xamax	30	15	7	8	61	40	+21	37	
7	Sion	30	12	11	7	51	36	+15	35	
8	Luzern	30	14	3	13	57	56	+1	31	entered 1983 Intertoto Cup
9	Young Boys	30	11	8	11	35	42	−7	30	entered 1983 Intertoto Cup
10	Wettingen	30	8	9	13	40	47	−7	25	
11	Basel	30	10	5	15	47	56	−9	25	
12	Vevey	30	9	4	17	42	61	−19	22	
13	AC Bellinzona	30	8	5	17	36	74	−38	21	
14	Aarau	30	8	4	18	32	52	−20	20	
15	Bulle	30	4	4	22	27	87	−60	12	Relegated to 1983–84 Nationalliga B
16	Winterthur	30	2	6	22	30	74	−44	10	Relegated to 1983–84 Nationalliga B

Source: rsssf.com
Rules for classification: 1) Points; 2) Goal difference within the league, but decider play-off for qualifiers;

== Nationalliga B ==
=== League table ===
Pos	Team	Pld	W	D	L	GF	GA	GD	Pts	Qualification
1	FC La Chaux-de-Fonds	30	22	4	4	76	20	+56	48	Promotion to 1983–84 Nationalliga A
2	FC Chiasso	30	18	7	5	62	35	+27	43	Promotion to 1983–84 Nationalliga A
3	CS Chênois	30	17	6	7	62	39	+23	40	
4	Lugano	30	15	6	9	65	49	+16	36	
5	FC Biel-Bienne	30	16	4	10	64	51	+13	36	
6	FC Nordstern Basel	30	11	13	6	55	43	+12	35	
7	FC Fribourg	30	12	10	8	56	43	+13	34	
8	FC Monthey	30	12	7	11	63	51	+12	31	
9	FC Laufen	30	11	9	10	43	49	−6	31	
10	FC Grenchen	30	9	10	11	35	43	−8	28	
11	Mendrisiostar	30	9	10	11	40	50	−10	28	
12	FC Baden	30	9	9	12	35	48	−13	27	
13	FC Locarno	30	8	8	14	40	57	−17	24	
14	FC Bern	30	9	3	18	45	63	−18	21	Relegation to 1983–84 Swiss 1. Liga
15	FC Ibach	30	4	5	21	29	75	−46	13	Relegation to 1983–84 Swiss 1. Liga
16	FC Rüti	30	1	3	26	31	85	−54	5	Relegation to 1983–84 Swiss 1. Liga

Source: rsssf
Rules for classification: 1) Points; 2) Goal difference within the league, but decider play-off for qualifiers;

== 1. Liga ==
=== Group 1 ===
Pos	Team	Pld	W	D	L	GF	GA	GD	Pts	Qualification or relegation
1	Etoile Carouge FC	26	18	5	3	66	20	+46	41	Play-off to Nationalliga B
2	FC Martigny-Sports	26	16	5	5	85	36	+49	37	Play-off to Nationalliga B
3	Yverdon-Sport FC	26	11	9	6	37	23	+14	31	
4	FC Renens	26	11	9	6	37	33	+4	31	
5	FC Montreux-Sports	26	9	12	5	39	28	+11	30	
6	FC Saint-Jean GE	26	12	6	8	40	41	−1	30	
7	ES FC Malley	26	12	3	11	51	52	−1	27	
8	FC Stade Nyonnais	26	8	9	9	39	35	+4	25	
9	FC Stade Lausanne	26	8	9	9	37	40	−3	25	
10	FC Leytron	26	7	7	12	31	44	−13	21	
11	FC Fétigny	26	7	6	13	33	43	−10	20	
12	FC Raron	26	7	6	13	24	45	−21	20	Play-out against relegation
13	FC Orbe	26	4	8	14	32	67	−35	16	Relegation to 2. Liga Interregional
14	FC Sierre	26	3	4	19	19	63	−44	10	Relegation to 2. Liga Interregional

Source: RSSSF
Rules for classification: 1) Points; 2) Goal difference within the league, but decider play-off for qualifiers.

=== Group 2 ===
Pos	Team	Pld	W	D	L	GF	GA	GD	Pts	Qualification or relegation
1	BSC Old Boys	26	14	7	5	57	36	+21	35	Play-off to Nationalliga B
2	SR Delémont	26	11	10	5	44	32	+12	32	Play-off to Nationalliga B
3	FC Boudry	26	12	7	7	52	35	+17	31	
4	FC Breitenbach	26	11	8	7	53	38	+15	30	
5	FC Aurore Bienne	26	8	13	5	42	28	+14	29	
6	SC Burgdorf	26	9	10	7	61	42	+19	28	
7	FC Concordia Basel	26	10	7	9	49	43	+6	27	
8	US Boncourt	26	8	10	8	37	44	−7	26	
9	FC Köniz	26	8	10	8	33	38	−5	25	
10	FC Solothurn	26	10	5	11	37	42	−5	25	
11	FC Allschwil	26	9	6	11	34	38	−4	24	
12	FC Birsfelden	26	7	9	10	32	45	−13	23	Play-out against relegation
13	FC Bôle	26	5	9	12	44	63	−19	19	Relegation to 2. Liga Interregional
14	FC Superga	26	1	7	18	20	71	−51	8	Relegation to 2. Liga Interregional

Source: RSSSF
Rules for classification: 1) Points; 2) Goal difference within the league, but decider play-off for qualifiers.

The game Superga-Köniz was not played, the game was valued 0–0 but no points were awarded.

=== Group 3 ===
Pos	Team	Pld	W	D	L	GF	GA	GD	Pts	Qualification or relegation
1	SC Kriens	26	17	7	2	63	27	+36	41	Play-off to Nationalliga B
2	SC Zug	26	19	2	5	62	29	+33	40	Play-off to Nationalliga B
3	FC Olten	26	13	8	5	49	29	+20	34	
4	FC Suhr	26	11	8	7	47	35	+12	30	
5	FC Emmen	26	12	6	8	57	46	+11	30	
6	FC Zug	26	10	8	8	36	26	+10	28	
7	FC Klus-Balsthal	26	9	6	11	44	50	−6	24	
8	FC Emmenbrücke	26	8	7	11	43	41	+2	23	
9	FC Brugg	26	8	7	11	38	50	−12	23	
10	FC Sursee	26	7	8	11	36	46	−10	22	
11	SC Buochs	26	7	6	13	34	58	−24	20	
12	FC Oberentfelden	26	6	6	14	26	41	−15	18	Decider for twelfth place
13	FC Tresa	26	4	10	12	27	52	−25	18	Decider for twelfth place
14	US Giubiasco	26	4	5	17	35	67	−32	13	Relegation to 2. Liga Interregional

Source: RSSSF
Rules for classification: 1) Points; 2) Goal difference within the league, but decider play-off for qualifiers.

==== Decider for twelfth place ====
The decider was played on 29 May in Zug.

Team 1	Score	Team 2
FC Oberentfelden	2–1	FC Tresa

FC Oberentfelden win and continue in play-outs. FC Tresa are relegated directly to 2. Liga Interregional.

=== Group 4 ===
Pos	Team	Pld	W	D	L	GF	GA	GD	Pts	Qualification or relegation
1	FC Altstätten (St. Gallen)	26	21	3	2	80	31	+49	45	Play-off to Nationalliga B
2	FC Red Star Zürich	26	18	3	5	65	31	+34	39	Play-off to Nationalliga B
3	FC Schaffhausen	26	15	6	5	67	36	+31	36	
4	FC Turicum	26	9	11	6	32	22	+10	29	
5	FC Brüttisellen	26	9	9	8	41	34	+7	27	
6	FC Küsnacht	26	11	4	11	34	39	−5	26	
7	FC Kreuzlingen	26	9	7	10	43	44	−1	25	
8	FC Balzers	26	7	10	9	40	46	−6	24	
9	FC Einsiedeln	26	9	4	13	49	64	−15	22	
10	FC Frauenfeld	26	7	7	12	37	43	−6	21	
11	FC Vaduz	26	5	10	11	29	42	−13	20	
12	FC Uzwil	26	7	5	14	31	53	−22	19	Decider for twelfth place
13	FC Blue Stars Zürich	26	7	5	14	34	50	−16	19	Decider for twelfth place
14	FC Widnau	26	4	4	18	33	80	−47	12	Relegation to 2. Liga Interregional

Source: RSSSF
Rules for classification: 1) Points; 2) Goal difference within the league, but decider play-off for qualifiers.

==== Decider for twelfth place ====
The decider was played on 29 May in Frauenfeld.

Team 1	Score	Team 2
FC Uzwil	4–2	FC Blue Stars Zürich

FC Uzwil win and continue in play-outs. FC Blue Stars Zürich are relegated directly to 2. Liga Interregional.

=== Promotion play-off ===
==== Qualification round ====
Team 1	Score	Team 2
FC Martigny-Sports	2–1	FC Altstätten (St. Gallen)
FC Altstätten (St. Gallen)	1–2	FC Martigny-Sports

FC Martigny-Sports win 4–2 on aggregate and continue to the finals.

Team 1	Score	Team 2
Etoile Carouge FC	1–1	FC Red Star Zürich
FC Red Star Zürich	3–1	Etoile Carouge FC

FC Red Star Zürich win 4–2 on aggregate and continue to the finals.

Team 1	Score	Team 2
SC Zug	3–0	BSC Old Boys
BSC Old Boys	1–2	SC Zug

SC Zug win 5–1 on aggregate and continue to the finals.

Team 1	Score	Team 2
SR Delémont	0–0	SC Kriens
SC Kriens	0–0	SR Delémont
SR Delémont	0–2	SC Kriens

SC Kriens win the replay and continue to the finals.

==== Final round ====
Team 1	Score	Team 2
FC Red Star Zürich	1–2	SC Zug
SC Zug	2–1	FC Red Star Zürich

SC Zug win 4–2 on aggregate and are promoted to 1983–84 Nationalliga B.

Team 1	Score	Team 2
FC Martigny-Sports	3–2	SC Kriens
SC Kriens	2–2	FC Martigny-Sports

FC Martigny-Sports win 5–2 on aggregate and are promoted to 1983–84 Nationalliga B.

==== Decider for third place ====
The decider was played on 25 and 28 June.

Team 1	Score	Team 2
SC Kriens	0–4	FC Red Star Zürich
FC Red Star Zürich	2–1	SC Kriens

FC Red Star Zürich win 6–1 on aggregate and are promoted to 1983–84 Nationalliga B. SC Kriens remain in 1. Liga.

==== Decider for 1. Liga championship ====
The decider was played on 24 June in Martigny.

Team 1	Score	Team 2
FC Martigny-Sports	4–1	SC Zug

FC Martigny-Sports win and are 1. Liga champions.

=== Relegation play-out ===
==== First round ====
Team 1	Score	Team 2
FC Raron	2–0	FC Birsfelden
FC Birsfelden	0–2	FC Raron

FC Raron win 4–2 on aggregate. FC Birsfelden continue to the final.

Team 1	Score	Team 2
FC Uzwil	3–1	FC Oberentfelden
FC Oberentfelden	1–1	FC Uzwil

FC Uzwil win 4–2 on aggregate. FC Oberentfelden continue to the final.

==== Final round ====
Team 1	Score	Team 2
FC Oberentfelden	2–3	FC Birsfelden
FC Birsfelden	1–3	FC Oberentfelden

FC Oberentfelden win 5–4 on aggregate. FC Birsfelden are relegated to 2. Liga.

== Swiss Cup ==
=== Early rounds ===
The routes of the finalists to the final were:

- Round 3: Küsnacht-GC 1:3. Leytron-Servette 0:2.
- Round 4: GC-Laufen 3:0. Fribourg-Servette 1:4.
- Round 5: Neuchâtel Xamax-GC 1:1 a.e.t. Replay: GC-Xamax 0:0 a.e.t. 4:2 after penalties. Bern-Servette 0:3.
- Quarter-finals: St. Gallen-GC 0:1. Servette-Mendrisio 4:1.
- Semi-finals: GC-Zürich 5:1. YB-Servette 0:1.

=== Final ===
Whit Monday 23 May 1983

Grasshopper Club	2–2 (a.e.t.)	Servette
Seramondi 50' (o.g.); Egli 117'	Report	47' Seramondi; 105' Brigger

Wankdorf Stadium, Bern
Referee: (Switzerland)

Replay: 14 June 1983

Grasshopper Club	3–0	Servette
Egli 16'; Sulser 33' 72'	Report

Wankdorf Stadium, Bern
Attendance: 26,000
Referee: (Switzerland) Renzo Peduzzi (Roveredo)

== Swiss Clubs in Europe ==
- Grasshopper Club as 1981–82 Nationalliga A champions: 1982–83 European Cup
- Sion as 1981–82 Swiss Cup winners: 1982–83 Cup Winners' Cup
- Servette as league runners-up: 1982–83 UEFA Cup
- Zürich as league third placed team: 1982–83 UEFA Cup and entered 1982 Intertoto Cup
- Young Boys: entered 1982 Intertoto Cup
- Luzern: entered 1982 Intertoto Cup
- St. Gallen: entered 1982 Intertoto Cup

=== Grasshopper Club ===
==== European Cup ====
===== First round =====
15 September 1982 First leg	Grasshopper Club (Switzerland)	0–1	(Soviet Union) Dynamo Kyiv	Hardturm, Zürich
20:00		Report	Hermann 84' (o.g.)	Attendance: 11,600; Referee: Marcel Bacou (France)

29 September 1982 Second leg	Dynamo Kyiv (Soviet Union)	3–0	(Switzerland) Grasshopper Club	Republican Stadium, Kyiv
19:00	Buryak 17', 90'; Demyanenko 36'	Report		Attendance: 94,300; Referee: Henk van Ettekoven (Netherlands)

Dynamo Kyiv won 4–0 on aggregate

=== Sion ===
==== Cup Winners' Cup ====
===== Preliminary round =====
18 August 1982 First leg	Aberdeen (Scotland)	7–0	(Switzerland) Sion	Pittodrie Stadium, Aberdeen
	Black 2', 56'; Strachan 21'; Hewitt 23'; Simpson 34'; McGhee 63'; Kennedy 82'	Report		Attendance: 12,013; Referee: Karl-Heinz Tritschler (West Germany)

1 September 1982 Second leg	Sion (Switzerland)	1–4	(Scotland) Aberdeen	Stade Tourbillon, Sion
	Bregy 69'	Report	Hewitt 27'; Miller 61'; McGhee 64', 72'	Attendance: 2,400; Referee: J. Glazar (Yugoslavia)

=== Servette ===
==== UEFA Cup ====
===== First round =====
8 September 1982 First leg	Progrès Niederkorn (Luxembourg)	0–1	(Switzerland) Servette	Stade Jos Haupert, Niederkorn
20:00		Report	Brigger 58'	Attendance: 717; Referee: Werner Föckler (West Germany)

29 September 1982 Second leg	Servette (Switzerland)	3–0	(Luxembourg) Progrès Niederkorn	Stade des Charmilles, Geneva
20:30	Brigger 58'; Decastel 87'; Seramondi 89'	Report		Attendance: 4,817; Referee: Anthony Mangion (Malta)

Servette won 4–0 on aggregate.

===== Second Round =====
20 October 1982 First leg	Śląsk Wrocław (Poland)	0–2	(Switzerland) Servette	Stadion Olimpijski, Wrocław
17:00		Report	Decastel 68'; Favre 78'	Attendance: 20,000; Referee: John Carpenter (Republic of Ireland)

4 November 1982 Second leg	Servette (Switzerland)	5–1	(Poland) Śląsk Wrocław	Stade des Charmilles, Geneva
12:00	Favre 27' (pen.), 47'; Decastel 35', 73'; Brigger 37'	Report	Prusik 28'	Attendance: 9,100; Referee: Heinz Fahnler (Austria)

Servette won 7–1 on aggregate.

===== Third round =====
24 November 1982 First leg	Servette (Switzerland)	2–2	(Czechoslovakia) Bohemians	Stade des Charmilles, Geneva
20:00	Schnyder 54'; Elia 81'	Report	Sloup 23'; Chaloupka 71'	Attendance: 16,000; Referee: László Győri (Hungary)

8 December 1982 Second leg	Bohemians (Czechoslovakia)	2–1	(Switzerland) Servette	Ďolíček, Prague
16:00	Čermák 41'; Příložný 89' (pen.)	Report	Decastel 17'	Attendance: 17,000; Referee: Henning Lund-Sørensen (Denmark)

Bohemians won 4–3 on aggregate.

=== Zürich ===
==== UEFA Cup ====
===== First round =====
15 September 1982 First leg	Pezoporikos Larnaca (Cyprus)	2–2	(Switzerland) Zürich	GSZ Stadium, Larnaca
15:30	Theofanous 24'; Vernon 35'	Report	Seiler 40'; Jerković 50'	Attendance: 3,000; Referee: Akhmed Yasharov (Bulgaria)

29 September 1982 Second leg	Zürich (Switzerland)	1–0	(Cyprus) Pezoporikos Larnaca	Letzigrund, Zürich
20:00	Lüdi 69'	Report		Attendance: 3,200; Referee: Gerald Losert (Austria)

Zürich won 3–2 on aggregate.

===== Second Round =====
20 October 1982 First leg	Ferencváros (Hungary)	1–1	(Switzerland) Zürich	Üllői úti Stadion, Budapest
18:00	Szokolai 56'	Report	Seiler 18'	Attendance: 18,612; Referee: Victoriano Sánchez Arminio (Spain)

3 November 1982 Second leg	Zürich (Switzerland)	1–0	(Hungary) Ferencváros	Letzigrund, Zürich
20:00	Seiler 56'	Report		Attendance: 9,100; Referee: Mircea Salomir (Romania)

FC Zürich won 2–1 on aggregate.

===== Third round =====
24 November 1982 First leg	Zürich (Switzerland)	1–1	(Portugal) Benfica	Letzigrund, Zürich
20:00	W. Rufer 76'	Report	Filipović 86'	Attendance: 19,000; Referee: Siegfried Kirschen (East Germany)

8 December 1982 Second leg	Benfica (Portugal)	4–0	(Switzerland) Zürich	Estádio da Luz, Lisbon
21:00	Filipović 12'; Diamantino 51'; Nené 60', 86' (pen.)	Report		Attendance: 75,000; Referee: Volker Roth (West Germany)

Benfica won 5–1 on aggregate.

==== Intertoto Cup ====
===== Group 8 =====
Matches

26 June 1982 Round 1	Zbrojovka Brno (Czechoslovakia)	4–1	(Switzerland) Zürich	Brno
	Nesvacil 6' (1:0) (Staub) 15' (o.g.); Mikulicka 55' (3:0); Češek 62' (4:0)	FCZ summary	69' (4:1) Kundert; (yellow card) Schönenberger	Attendance: 2,500; Referee: (Czechoslovakia) Wencl

3 July 1982 Round 2	Zürich (Switzerland)	1–2	(Sweden) Öster	Paul-Walser-Stiftung, Wohlen, Aargau
	Seiler 62' (1:2)	FCZ summary	27' (0:1) Stavander; 42' (0:2) Stavander	Attendance: 800; Referee: (Switzerland) Ulrich Nyffenegger (Nidau)

10 July 1982 Round 3	Öster (Sweden)	3–0	(Switzerland) Zürich	Borgholm
	Mattsson 40' (1:0); Hallén 78' (2:0); Hallén 90' (3:0)	FCZ summary	(yellow card) Maissen; (yellow card) Lüdi; (yellow card) Zappa	Attendance: 2,500; Referee: (Sweden) Harrisson

17 July 1982 Round 4	Zürich (Switzerland)	2–3	(Czechoslovakia) Zbrojovka Brno	Sportplatz Moos, Affoltern am Albis
	Rufer 2' (1:0); Zwicker 62' (2:2)	FCZ summary	12' (pen. 1:1) Janečka; 42' (1:2) Janečka; 78' (2:3) Nesvacil; (yellow card) 80' Mikulicka	Attendance: 900; Referee: (Switzerland) Jakob Baumann (Schaffhausen)

24 July 1982 Round 5	ŁKS Łódź (Poland)	3–0	(Switzerland) Zürich	Łódź
	Plachta 26' (1:0); Wesolowski 36' (2:0); Milczarski 84' (3:0)	FCZ summary	(red card) Zappa; (yellow card) Jerković; (yellow card) Landolt	Attendance: 1,000; Referee: (Poland) Władysław Urbańczyk

31 July 1982 Round 6	Zürich (Switzerland)	3–0	(Poland) ŁKS Łódź	Beichlen, Wädenswil
	Jerković 53' (1:0); Rufer 68' (2:0); Lüdi 87' (3:0)	FCZ summary		Attendance: 1,000; Referee: (Switzerland) Jean-Marie Macheret (Rueyres-Saint-Laurent)

Final league table

Pos	Team	Pld	W	D	L	GF	GA	GD	Pts	ÖST	BRN	ŁKS	ZÜR
1	(Sweden) Öster	6	4	1	1	12	7	+5	9	—	2–0	4–3	3–0
1	(Czechoslovakia) Zbrojovka Brno	6	4	1	1	11	6	+5	9	2–0	—	2–1	4–1
3	(Poland) ŁKS Łódź	6	1	2	3	8	10	−2	4	1–1	0–0	—	3–0
4	(Switzerland) Zürich	6	1	0	5	7	15	−8	2	1–2	2–3	3–0	—

Source: mogiel.net
Rules for classification: 1) Points; 2) Goal difference; 3) Goals scored; 4) Head-to-head points; 5) Away goals scored; 6) Draw.

=== Young Boys ===
==== Intertoto Cup ====
===== Group 6 =====
Pos	Team	Pld	W	D	L	GF	GA	GD	Pts	B05	GWA	YB	LIN
1	(Czechoslovakia) Bohemians Prague	6	6	0	0	16	3	+13	12	—	1–0	5–0	2–1
2	(Poland) Gwardia Warsaw	6	2	1	3	7	8	−1	5	0–1	—	2–2	1–0
3	(Switzerland) Young Boys	6	2	1	3	8	13	−5	5	1–3	2–1	—	0–2
4	(Austria) LASK	6	1	0	5	6	13	−7	2	1–4	2–3	0–3	—

Source: mogiel.net
Rules for classification: 1) Points; 2) Goal difference; 3) Goals scored; 4) Head-to-head points; 5) Away goals scored; 6) Draw.

=== Luzern ===
==== Intertoto Cup ====
===== Group 4 =====
Pos	Team	Pld	W	D	L	GF	GA	GD	Pts	LYN	DUI	MOL	LUZ
1	(Denmark) Lyngby	6	3	2	1	11	7	+4	8	—	1–3	0–0	2–0
2	(West Germany) Duisburg	6	3	1	2	12	7	+5	7	1–2	—	4–1	2–0
3	(Poland) Motor Lublin	6	1	3	2	8	11	−3	5	2–2	3–2	—	2–2
4	(Switzerland) Luzern	6	1	2	3	4	10	−6	4	1–4	0–0	1–0	—

Source: mogiel.net
Rules for classification: 1) Points; 2) Goal difference; 3) Goals scored; 4) Head-to-head points; 5) Away goals scored; 6) Draw.

=== St. Gallen ===
==== Intertoto Cup ====
===== Group 2 =====
Pos	Team	Pld	W	D	L	GF	GA	GD	Pts	WID	BIE	STG	LIÈ
1	(Poland) Widzew Łódź	6	3	1	2	8	7	+1	7	—	2–1	0–1	3–1
2	(West Germany) Arminia Bielefeld	6	2	2	2	10	9	+1	6	1–1	—	3–1	1–1
3	(Switzerland) St. Gallen	6	3	0	3	7	8	−1	6	1–2	1–2	—	1–0
4	(Belgium) Liège	6	2	1	3	8	9	−1	5	2–0	3–2	1–2	—

Source: mogiel.net
Rules for classification: 1) Points; 2) Goal difference; 3) Goals scored; 4) Head-to-head points; 5) Away goals scored; 6) Draw.

== Sources ==
- Switzerland 1982–83 at RSSSF
- Cup finals at Fussball-Schweiz
- European Competitions 1982–83 at RSSSF.com
- Intertoto history at Pawel Mogielnicki's Page
- Josef Zindel (2018). FC Basel 1893. Die ersten 125 Jahre (in German). Basel: Friedrich Reinhardt Verlag. ISBN 978-3-7245-2305-5.

Preceded by 1981–82	Seasons in Swiss football	Succeeded by 1983–84
