= 1984–85 Swiss Cup =

Tournament details
- Country: Switzerland

Final positions
- Champions: Aarau
- Runners-up: Neuchâtel Xamax

The 1984–85 Swiss Cup was the 60th season of Switzerland's annual football cup competition.

== Overview ==
The competition began on 3 and 4 August 1984 with the first games of Round 1 and ended on Whit Monday 27 May 1985 with the final held at the former Wankdorf Stadium in Bern. The teams from the Nationalliga B were granted byes for the first round. The teams from the Nationalliga A were granted byes for the first two rounds. The winners of the cup qualified themselves for the first round of the Cup Winners' Cup in the next season.

== Round 3 ==
The teams from the NLA joined the cup competition in the third round. The draw was respecting regionalities, when possible, and the lower classed team was granted home advantage.

=== Summary ===
Team 1	Score	Team 2
14 September 1984
FC Farvagny-Ogoz	1–10	La Chaux-de-Fonds
FC Dübendorf	1–0	Tuggen
15 September 1984
FC Altstätten SG	0–2	Lugano
Bellinzona	0–4	Zürich
FC Diepoldsau	2–0	FC Ascona
FC Ibach	0–3	Chiasso
Locarno	1–4	SC Zug
FC Uster	1–6	Grasshopper Club
Old Boys	4–5	Laufen
Biel-Bienne	5–2	FC Klus-Balsthal
FC Olten	2–3	Grenchen
Red Star	0–5	St. Gallen
Martigny-Sports	1–0	Yverdon-Sport
Etoile Carouge	2–0	Chênois
FC Leytron	0–3	Vevey Sports
FC Volketswil	1–1 (a.e.t.) (5–4 p)	FC Altdorf (Uri)
FC Brüttisellen	0–5	Winterthur
FC Lengnau	0–3	Young Boys
FC Fétigny	1–4	Sion
FC Einsielden	2–4	Kriens
Baden	1–2	Aarau
Dürrenast	0–4	Basel
FC Sursee	0–2 (a.e.t.)	FC Langenthal
Colombier	2–4	FC Saint-Jean GE
Bulle	1–2 (a.e.t.)	Servette
Schaffhausen	7–1	Köniz
FC Le Locle	3–0	FC Domdidier
Fribourg	1–5	Neuchâtel Xamax
FC Lutry	0–8	Lausanne-Sport
Stade Nyonnais	2–6	Stade Lausanne
FC Oberwil	0–8	Wettingen
FC Bellach	0–11	Luzern

=== Matches ===
15 September 1984
20:00

Bellinzona	0–4	Zürich
	FCZ summary	40' (0:1) Rufer; 86' (0:2) Rufer; 89' (0:3) Rufer; 90' (0:4) Jerković

Stadio Comunale, Bellinzona
Attendance: 800
Referee: (Switzerland) Gottlieb Barmettler Oberrieden, Luzern

15 September 1984
16:00

FC Lengnau	0–3	Young Boys
	YB summary	12' (0:1) Conz; 55' (0:2) Bregy; 79' (0:3) Radi

Moos, Lengnau
Attendance: 1,500
Referee: (Switzerland) Alfred Heinis (Ammannsegg)

15 September 1984
20:00

Baden	1–2	Aarau
Allegretti 73' (1:1)	FCA summary	65' (0:1) Herberth; 78' (1:2) Herberth

Esp Stadium, Baden
Attendance: 1,700
Referee: (Switzerland) Andreas Schluchter (Schönenbuch)

15 September 1984
16:00

FC Dürrenast	0–4	Basel
	Summary	19' (0:1) Andermatt; 37' (0:2) Grossenbacher; (yellow card) 40' Feigenwinter; 72' (0:3) Zbinden; 88' (0:4) Sutter

Stadion Lachen, Thun
Attendance: 1,050
Referee: (Switzerland) Fredy Phillippoz

15 September 1984
20:30

Bulle	1–2 (a.e.t.)	Servette
Goal	summary	Favre; Barberis

Stade de Bouleyres, Bulle

== Round 4 ==
=== Summary ===
Team 1	Score	Team 2
20 October 1984
Chiasso	0–1	Grasshopper Club
FC Diepoldsau	1–4	Laufen
St. Gallen	3–2	Lugano
Vevey Sports	4–1	La Chaux-de-Fonds
FC Volketswil	1–9	Winterthur
Young Boys	4–2	Sion
Kriens	0–1	Aarau
Basel	6–0	FC Langenthal
FC Saint-Jean GE	0–3	Servette
FC Dübendorf	1–2	Schaffhausen
Le Locle-Sports	0–4	Neuchâtel Xamax
Lausanne-Sport	5–1	Stade Lausanne
21 October 1984
Wettingen	3–1	Luzern
SC Zug	2–3	Zürich
Biel-Bienne	1–3	Grenchen
Martigny-Sports	1–4	Étoile-Sporting

=== Matches ===
20 October 1984
18:00

Young Boys	4–2	Sion
Ben Brahim 6' (1:0); Bamert 70' (2:2); Bregy 75' (3:2); Bregy 81' (4:2)	YB summary	59' (1:1) Cina; 69' (1:2) Mauron

Wankdorf Stadium, Bern
Attendance: 4,500
Referee: (Switzerland) Alfred Heinis

20 October 1984
16:30

Kriens	0–1	Aarau
	FCA summary	84' (0:1) Granzotto

Stadion Kleinfeld, Kriens
Attendance: 2,000
Referee: (Switzerland) Rudolf Affolter

20 October 1984
17:30

Basel	6–0	FC Langenthal
Nadig 32' (1:0); Hauser 47' (2:0); Nadig 57' (3:0); Hauser 60' (4:0); Sutter 75' (5:0); Sutter 77' (6:0)	FCB summary

St. Jakob Stadium, Basel
Attendance: 1,200
Referee: (Switzerland) Alfred Heinis

20 October 1984

FC Saint-Jean GE	0–3	Servette
	summary	2x Barberis; 1x Schnyder

Centre sportif de Varembé

21 October 1984

SC Zug	2–3	Zürich
Killmaier 8' (1:0); Hans Kok 21' (2:0)	FCZ summary	36' (2:1) Schneider; 42' (o.g.) Marin; 90+2' (2:3) Häusermann

Herti Allmend Stadion, Zug
Attendance: 3,450
Referee: (Switzerland) Bruno Galler (Kirchdorf, Bern)

== Round 5 ==
=== Summary ===
Team 1	Score	Team 2
16 March 1985
St. Gallen	1–0	Étoile-Sporting
17 March 1985
Grasshopper Club	2–0	Laufen
Grenchen	2–1 (a.e.t.)	Zürich
Vevey Sports	3–1 (a.e.t.)	Winterthur
Young Boys	2–3 (a.e.t.)	Aarau
Basel	0–1	Servette
Schaffhausen	0–4	Neuchâtel Xamax
19 March 1985
Lausanne-Sport	4–0	Wettingen

=== Matches ===
17 March 1985
14:30

Grenchen	2–1 (a.e.t.)	Zürich
Baur 8' (1:0); Röthlisberger 95' (2:1)	FCZ summary	19' (1:1) Tanner

Stadium Brühl, Grenchen
Attendance: 2,700
Referee: (Switzerland) Arturo Martino (Neukirch an der Thur)

17 March 1985
14:30

Young Boys	2–3 (a.e.t.)	Aarau
Bregy 59' (1:0); Lunde 85' (2:2)	YB summary FCA summary	69' (1:1) Seiler; 79' (1:2) Zwahlen; 99' (2:3) Meyer

Wankdorf Stadium, Bern
Attendance: 8,000
Referee: (Switzerland) Gottlieb Barmettler (Luzern)

17 March 1985
14:30

Basel	0–1	Servette
	Summary	41' (0:1) Kok

St. Jakob Stadium, Basel
Attendance: 5,300
Referee: (Switzerland) Bruno Galler (Kirchdorf, Bern)

== Quarter-finals ==
=== Summary ===
Team 1	Score	Team 2
8 April 1985
Aarau	2–0	Grenchen
Servette	3–0	St. Gallen
Neuchâtel Xamax	4–1	Vevey Sports
Lausanne-Sport	0–0 (a.e.t.) (5–4 p)	Grasshopper Club

=== Matches ===
8 April 1985
17:30

Aarau	2–0	Grenchen
Fregno 10'; Fregno 45'	FCA summary

Stadion Brügglifeld, Aarau
Attendance: 5,700
Referee: (Switzerland) Renzo Peduzzi (Roveredo)

8 April 1985
20:00

Servette	3–0	St. Gallen
Decastel; Kok; Schnyder	Servette summary

Stade des Charmilles, Geneva
Attendance: 7,800
Referee: (Switzerland) Rolf Blattmann (Zeiningen)

== Semi-finals ==
=== Summary ===
Team 1	Score	Team 2
14 May 1985
Aarau	3–1	Servette
Neuchâtel Xamax	3–2	Lausanne-Sport

=== Matches ===
14 May 1985
20:00

Aarau	3–1	Servette
Iselin 25' (pen.); Seiler 54' (2:0); Fregno 89' (3:1)	FCA summary	68' (2:1) Brigger

Stadion Brügglifeld, Aarau
Attendance: 11,000
Referee: (Switzerland) Renzo Peduzzi (Roveredo)

14 May 1985
20:00

Neuchâtel Xamax	3–2	Lausanne-Sport
Elsener 31' (1:1); Küffer 79' (2:1); Lüthi 90+1' (3:1)	[ summary]	26' (0:1) Andrey; 82' (2:2) Pellegrini

Stade de la Maladière Neuchâtel
Attendance: 8,400
Referee: (Switzerland) Arturo Martino (Neukirch an der Thur)

== Final ==
The final was held in the former Wankdorf Stadium on Whit Monday 1985.

=== Summary ===
Team 1	Score	Team 2
1 19
Aarau	1–0	Xamax

=== Telegram ===
17 May 1985
14:30

Aarau	1–0	Neuchâtel Xamax
Iselin 86'	Fussball-Schweiz summary

Wankdorf Stadium, Bern
Attendance: 32,000
Referee: (Switzerland) Willi Jaus (Feldmeilen)

Aarau won the cup and this was the club's first cup title to this date.

== Further in Swiss football ==
- 1984–85 Nationalliga A
- 1984–85 Swiss 1. Liga

== Sources ==
- Fussball-Schweiz
- 1984–85 at fcb-achiv.ch
- Switzerland 1984–85 at RSSSF

Preceded by 1983–84	Swiss Cup seasons	Succeeded by 1985–86
