= Bjorn Gugger =

South African/Swiss soccer player

Personal information
- Date of birth: 23 June 1980 (age 46)
- Place of birth: Pretoria, South Africa
- Height: 1.74 m (5 ft 9 in)
- Positions: Defender; wingback

Youth career
- Arcadia Shepherds FC 9th Ave Rangers FC

Senior career*
Years	Team	Apps	(Gls)
-2001	BSC Young Boys	1+	(0+)
- SC Kriens
- Zug 94
2004-2006	Bidvest Wits		
2006-2008	Moroka Swallows		
- * Club domestic league appearances and goals

Bjorn Gugger (born 23 June 1980) is a South African retired soccer player who is last known to have played as a defender for Moroka Swallows.

== Career ==
Gugger started his career in South Africa, moving onto the Swiss side BSC Young Boys at the age of 18. The 6 year spell in Switzerland was hampered as he suffered multiple injuries. In 2004, Gugger signed for Bidvest Wits in South Africa. At the age of 28, he retired due to injury.
