= 1983–84 Swiss 1. Liga =

1. Liga
- Season: 1983–84
- Champions: Overall champions FC Schaffhausen; Group 1: Etoile Carouge FC; Group 2: FC Köniz; Group 3: SC Kriens; Group 4: FC Schaffhausen
- Promoted: Etoile Carouge FC; Yverdon-Sport FC; FC Schaffhausen
- Relegated: Group 1: FC Raron; FC Boudry; FC Stade Nyonnais; Group 2: FC Allschwil; FC Aurore Bienne; Group 3: FC Emmen; FC Oberentfelden; Group 4: FC Balzers; FC Uzwil
- Matches: 4 times 182 plus 15 play-offs and 4 play-outs

The 1983–84 Swiss 1. Liga was the 52nd season of this league since its creation in 1931. At this time, the 1. Liga was the third tier of the Swiss football league system and it was the highest level of amateur football.

== Format ==
There were 56 clubs in the 1. Liga, divided into four regional groups, each with 14 teams. Within each group, the teams would play a double round-robin to decide their league position. Two points were awarded for a win. The four group winners and the four runners-up contested a first play-off round to decide three promotion slots. The two last placed teams in each group were directly relegated to the 2. Liga (fourth tier).

== Group 1 ==
=== Teams ===
Club	Canton	Stadium	Capacity
FC Boudry	Neuchâtel	Stade des Buchilles	1,500
Étoile Carouge FC	Geneva	Stade de la Fontenette	3,690
FC Fétigny	Fribourg	Stade Communal - Fétigny	500
FC Leytron	Valais	Stade Saint-Martin	1,000
ES FC Malley	Vaud	Centre Sportif de la Tuilière	1,500
FC Montreux-Sports	Vaud	Stade de Chailly	1,000
FC Raron	Valais	Sportplatz Rhoneglut	1,000
FC Renens	Waadt	Zone sportive du Censuy	2,300
FC Saint-Jean GE	Geneva	Centre sportif de Varembé	3,000
FC Savièse	Valais	Stade St-Germain	2,000
FC Stade Lausanne	Vaud	Centre sportif de Vidy	1,000
FC Stade Nyonnais	Vaud	Stade de Colovray	7,200
FC Stade Payerne	Vaud	Stade Municipal	1,100
Yverdon-Sport FC	Vaud	Stade Municipal	6,600

=== Final league table ===
Pos	Team	Pld	W	D	L	GF	GA	GD	Pts	Qualification or relegation
1	Etoile Carouge FC	26	16	5	5	58	25	+33	37	Play-off to Nationalliga B
2	Yverdon-Sport FC	26	16	4	6	61	34	+27	36	Play-off to Nationalliga B
3	FC Leytron	26	13	9	4	54	34	+20	35	
4	FC Montreux-Sports	26	13	6	7	48	39	+9	32	
5	ES FC Malley	26	11	7	8	54	42	+12	29	
6	FC Renens	26	10	7	9	36	40	−4	27	
7	FC Saint-Jean GE	26	10	6	10	53	51	+2	26	
8	FC Stade Lausanne	26	9	7	10	34	39	−5	25	
9	FC Fétigny	26	9	6	11	39	44	−5	24	
10	FC Savièse	26	12	0	14	54	62	−8	24	
11	FC Stade Payerne	26	8	8	10	40	49	−9	24	
12	FC Raron	26	7	6	13	28	39	−11	20	Play-out against relegation
13	FC Boudry	26	6	5	15	28	52	−24	17	Relegation to 2. Liga Interregional
14	FC Stade Nyonnais	26	3	2	21	33	70	−37	8	Relegation to 2. Liga Interregional

Source: RSSSF
Rules for classification: 1) Points; 2) Goal difference within the league, but decider play-off for qualifiers.

== Group 2 ==
=== Teams ===
Club	Canton	Stadium	Capacity
FC Allschwil	Basel-Country	Im Brüel, Allschwil	1,700
FC Aurore Bienne	Bern	Tilleul-Linde	1,000
FC Bern	Bern	Stadion Neufeld	14,000
FC Breitenbach	Solothurn	Grien	2,000
US Boncourt	Jura	Stade Communal Léon Burrus	1,640
SC Burgdorf	canton of Bern	Stadion Neumatt	3,850
FC Concordia Basel	Basel-Stadt	Stadion Rankhof	7,000
SR Delémont	Jura	La Blancherie	5,263
FC Köniz	Bern	Sportplatz Liebefeld-Hessgut	2,600
FC Le Locle	Neuchâtel	Installation sportive - Jeanneret	3,142
FC Lengnau	Bern	Moos Lengnau BE	3,900
BSC Old Boys	Basel-Stadt	Stadion Schützenmatte	8,000
FC Solothurn	Solothurn	Stadion FC Solothurn	6,750
FC Thun	Bern	Stadion Lachen	10,350

=== Final league table ===
Pos	Team	Pld	W	D	L	GF	GA	GD	Pts	Qualification or relegation
1	FC Köniz	26	16	5	5	44	28	+16	37	Play-off to Nationalliga B
2	FC Breitenbach	26	14	3	9	45	36	+9	31	Play-off to Nationalliga B
3	FC Concordia Basel	26	12	6	8	35	28	+7	30	
4	FC Lengnau	26	9	11	6	42	34	+8	29	
5	SR Delémont	26	10	8	8	44	36	+8	28	
6	US Boncourt	26	9	8	9	40	31	+9	26	
7	FC Bern	26	9	8	9	37	43	−6	26	
8	BSC Old Boys	26	9	7	10	35	30	+5	25	
9	SC Burgdorf	26	8	9	9	39	37	+2	25	
10	FC Thun	26	8	9	9	48	48	0	25	
11	FC Le Locle	26	8	9	9	41	42	−1	25	
12	FC Solothurn	26	9	7	10	40	50	−10	25	Play-out against relegation
13	FC Allschwil	26	7	7	12	32	45	−13	21	Relegation to 2. Liga Interregional
14	FC Aurore Bienne	26	3	5	18	18	52	−34	11	Relegation to 2. Liga Interregional

Source: RSSSF
Rules for classification: 1) Points; 2) Goal difference within the league, but decider play-off for qualifiers.

== Group 3 ==
=== Teams ===
Club	Canton	Stadium	Capacity
FC Bremgarten	Aargau	Bärenmatt	2,000
FC Brugg	Aargau	Stadion Au	3,300
SC Buochs	Nidwalden	Stadion Seefeld	5,000
SC Emmen	Lucerne	Sportanlage Feldbreite	500
FC Emmenbrücke	Lucerne	Stadion Gersag	8,700
FC Ibach	Schwyz	Gerbihof	3,300
FC Klus-Balsthal	Solothurn	Sportplatz Moos	4,000
SC Kriens	Lucerne	Stadion Kleinfeld	5,100
FC Oberentfelden	Aargau	Schützenrain	1,500
FC Olten	Solothurn	Sportanlagen Kleinholz	8,000
SC Reiden	Lucerne	Kleinfeld	1,000
FC Sursee	Lucerne	Stadion Schlottermilch	3,500
FC Suhr	Aargau	Hofstattmatten	2,000
FC Zug	Zug	Herti Allmend Stadion	6,000

=== Final league table ===
Pos	Team	Pld	W	D	L	GF	GA	GD	Pts	Qualification or relegation
1	SC Kriens	26	15	7	4	70	29	+41	37	Play-off to Nationalliga B
2	FC Zug	26	14	9	3	58	22	+36	37	Play-off to Nationalliga B
3	FC Olten	26	12	9	5	42	30	+12	33	
4	FC Suhr	26	12	7	7	43	32	+11	31	
5	FC Emmenbrücke	26	12	6	8	44	39	+5	30	
6	FC Klus-Balsthal	26	10	9	7	42	39	+3	29	
7	FC Bremgarten	26	11	5	10	41	49	−8	27	
8	FC Ibach	26	6	11	9	32	33	−1	23	
9	SC Reiden	26	7	9	10	29	38	−9	23	
10	FC Sursee	26	8	7	11	39	50	−11	23	
11	SC Buochs	26	5	12	9	28	33	−5	22	
12	FC Brugg	26	8	6	12	27	47	−20	22	Play-out against relegation
13	FC Emmen	26	7	4	15	42	52	−10	18	Relegation to 2. Liga Interregional
14	FC Oberentfelden	26	2	5	19	19	63	−44	9	Relegation to 2. Liga Interregional

Source: RSSSF
Rules for classification: 1) Points; 2) Goal difference within the league, but decider play-off for qualifiers.

== Group 4 ==
=== Teams ===
Club	Canton	Stadium	Capacity
FC Altstätten (St. Gallen)	St. Gallen	Grüntal Altstätten	1,000
FC Balzers	Liechtenstein	Sportplatz Rheinau	2,000
FC Brüttisellen	Zürich	Lindenbuck	1,000
FC Dübendorf	Zürich	Zelgli	1,500
FC Einsiedeln	Schwyz	Rappenmöösli	1,300
FC Frauenfeld	Thurgau	Kleine Allmend	6,370
FC Kreuzlingen	Thurgau	Sportplatz Hafenareal	1,200
FC Küsnacht	Zürich	Sportanlage Heslibach	2,300
FC Rorschach	Schwyz	Sportplatz Kellen	1,000
FC Rüti	Zürich	Schützenwiese	1,200
FC Schaffhausen	Schaffhausen	Berformance Arena Schaffhausen	8,200
FC Turicum	Zürich	Hardhof	1,000
FC Uzwil	St. Gallen	Rüti	1,000
FC Vaduz	Liechtenstein	Rheinpark Stadion	7,584

=== Final league table ===
Pos	Team	Pld	W	D	L	GF	GA	GD	Pts	Qualification or relegation
1	FC Schaffhausen	26	18	5	3	60	25	+35	41	Play-off to Nationalliga B
2	FC Vaduz	26	15	5	6	54	36	+18	35	Play-off to Nationalliga B
3	FC Kreuzlingen	26	14	5	7	54	42	+12	33	
4	FC Rüti	26	13	7	6	33	21	+12	33	
5	FC Brüttisellen	26	12	8	6	38	24	+14	32	
6	FC Altstätten (St. Gallen)	26	11	4	11	55	52	+3	26	
7	FC Dübendorf	26	10	6	10	35	35	0	26	
8	FC Einsiedeln	26	11	4	11	45	51	−6	26	
9	FC Frauenfeld	26	9	6	11	40	37	+3	24	
10	FC Turicum	26	6	9	11	42	55	−13	21	
11	FC Küsnacht	26	6	6	14	20	39	−19	18	
12	FC Rorschach	26	5	8	13	35	55	−20	18	Play-out against relegation
13	FC Balzers	26	6	5	15	25	42	−17	17	Relegation to 2. Liga Interregional
14	FC Uzwil	26	4	6	16	33	56	−23	14	Relegation to 2. Liga Interregional

Source: RSSSF
Rules for classification: 1) Points; 2) Goal difference within the league, but decider play-off for qualifiers.

== Promotion play-off ==
=== Qualification round ===
Team 1	Score	Team 2
SC Kriens	2–3	Yverdon-Sport FC
Yverdon-Sport FC	1–1	SC Kriens

Yverdon-Sport FC win 4–3 on aggregate and continue to the finals.

Team 1	Score	Team 2
FC Köniz	2–3	FC Zug
FC Zug	3–2	FC Köniz

FC Zug win 6–4 on aggregate and continue to the finals.

Team 1	Score	Team 2
FC Breitenbach	1–0	FC Schaffhausen
FC Schaffhausen	7–0	FC Breitenbach

FC Schaffhausen win 7–1 on aggregate and continue to the finals.

Team 1	Score	Team 2
FC Vaduz	1–2	Etoile Carouge FC
Etoile Carouge FC	1–0	FC Vaduz

Etoile Carouge FC win 3–1 on aggregate and continue to the finals.

=== Final round ===
Team 1	Score	Team 2
FC Schaffhausen	2–1	FC Zug
FC Zug	1–3	FC Schaffhausen

FC Schaffhausen win 5–2 on aggregate and are promoted to 1984–85 Nationalliga B.

Team 1	Score	Team 2
Etoile Carouge FC	1–0	Yverdon-Sport FC
Yverdon-Sport FC	2–1	Etoile Carouge FC

Etoile Carouge FC win on away goals and are promoted to 1984–85 Nationalliga B.

=== Decider for third place ===
Team 1	Score	Team 2
FC Zug	1–1	Yverdon-Sport FC
Yverdon-Sport FC	2–1 a.e.t.	FC Zug

Yverdon-Sport FC win 3–2 on aggregate and are promoted to 1984–85 Nationalliga B. FC Zug remain in 1. Liga.

=== Decider for 1. Liga championship ===
Team 1	Score	Team 2
FC Schaffhausen	1–0	Etoile Carouge FC

FC Schaffhausen win and are 1. Liga champions.

== Relegation play-out ==
=== First round ===
Team 1	Score	Team 2
FC Raron	1–6	FC Solothurn

FC Raron continue to the final.

Team 1	Score	Team 2
FC Brugg	1–0	FC Rorschach

FC Rorschach continue to the final.

=== Final round ===
Team 1	Score	Team 2
FC Raron	1–1	FC Rorschach
FC Rorschach	2–0	FC Raron

FC Rorschach win 3–1 on aggregate and remain in division. FC Raron are relegated to 2. Liga.

== Further in Swiss football ==
- 1983–84 Nationalliga A
- 1983–84 Nationalliga B
- 1983–84 Swiss Cup

== Sources ==
- Switzerland 1983–84 at RSSSF

Preceded by 1982–83	Seasons in Swiss 1. Liga	Succeeded by 1984–85
