= 1983–84 Nationalliga A =

Swiss football season

Nationalliga A
- Season: 1983–84
- Champions: Grasshopper Club (20th title)
- Relegated: Bellinzona; Chiasso
- Top goalscorer: Georges Bregy (Sion) 21 goals

Nationalliga B
- Season: 1983–84
- Champions: SC Zug
- Promoted: SC Zug; FC Winterthur
- Relegated: FC Fribourg; FC Nordstern Basel; FC Red Star Zürich
- Top goalscorer: Martin Wiggemansen (Lugano) 19 goals

Statistics of the Swiss National League in the 1983–84 football season, both Nationalliga A and Nationalliga B. This was the 87th season of top-tier and the 86th season of second-tier football in Switzerland.

== Overview ==
There were 32 member clubs in the Swiss Football Association (ASF/SFV), divided into two tiers of 16 teams each. The top tier was named Nationalliga A (NLA) and the second tier was named Nationalliga B (NLB). In both divisions the teams played a double round-robin to decide their table positions. The Swiss champions would qualify for the 1984–85 European Cup, the runners-up and third placed team would qualify for the 1984–85 UEFA Cup. The last two placed teams in the NLA were relegated to the NLB for the following season. The top two placed teams in the NLB would be promoted to the top tier. The last three teams in the NLB were relegated to next season's 1. Liga.

== Nationalliga A ==
The first round was played on 9 August 1983. There was to be a winter break between 27 November and 25 February 1984. The season was completed on 6 June 1984. Because the top two teams finished level on points, a championship play-off match was required and this took place on 15 June at the Wankdorf Stadium in Bern.

=== Teams ===
Team	Town	Canton	Stadium	Capacity
Aarau	Aarau	Aargau	Stadion Brügglifeld	9,240
Basel	Basel	Basel-Stadt	St. Jakob Stadium	36,800
Bellinzona	Bellinzona	Ticino	Stadio Comunale Bellinzona	5,000
Chiasso	Chiasso	Ticino	Stadio Comunale Riva IV	4,000
Grasshopper Club	Zürich	Zürich	Hardturm	20,000
La Chaux-de-Fonds	La Chaux-de-Fonds	Neuchâtel	Centre Sportif de la Charrière	12,700
Lausanne-Sports	Lausanne	Vaud	Pontaise	15,700
Luzern	Lucerne	Lucerne	Stadion Allmend	25,000
St. Gallen	St. Gallen	St. Gallen	Espenmoos	11,000
Servette	Geneva	Geneva	Stade des Charmilles	27,000
Sion	Sion	Valais	Stade de Tourbillon	16,000
Vevey-Sports	Vevey	Vaud	Stade de Copet	4,000
Wettingen	Wettingen	Aargau	Stadion Altenburg	10,000
Xamax	Neuchâtel	Neuchâtel	Stade de la Maladière	25,500
Young Boys	Bern	Bern	Wankdorf Stadium	56,000
Zürich	Zürich	Zürich	Letzigrund	25,000

=== Final league table ===
Pos	Team	Pld	W	D	L	GF	GA	GD	Pts	Qualification
1	Grasshopper Club	30	19	6	5	59	32	+27	44	Championship play-off winners, qualified for 1984–85 European Cup
2	Servette	30	19	6	5	67	31	+36	44	Championship play-off loosers Swiss Cup winners, qualified for 1984–85 Cup Winners' Cup
3	Sion	30	18	7	5	74	39	+35	43	qualified for 1984–85 UEFA Cup
4	Xamax	30	15	10	5	54	27	+27	40	qualified for 1984–85 UEFA Cup
5	St. Gallen	30	16	8	6	57	41	+16	40	entered 1984 Intertoto Cup
6	Lausanne-Sport	30	13	8	9	49	37	+12	34	
7	La Chaux-de-Fonds	30	12	9	9	52	47	+5	33	
8	Wettingen	30	12	6	12	43	43	0	30	entered 1984 Intertoto Cup
9	Basel	30	11	6	13	55	59	−4	28	
10	Aarau	30	9	9	12	50	42	+8	27	
11	Young Boys	30	8	9	13	39	40	−1	25	
12	Zürich	30	8	8	14	39	56	−17	24	entered 1984 Intertoto Cup
13	Vevey-Sports	30	9	6	15	43	65	−22	24	
14	Luzern	30	9	4	17	35	52	−17	22	entered 1984 Intertoto Cup
15	Bellinzona	30	4	4	22	30	79	−49	12	Relegated to 1984–85 Nationalliga B
16	Chiasso	30	4	2	24	26	82	−56	10	Relegated to 1984–85 Nationalliga B

Source: rsssf.com
Rules for classification: 1) Points; 2) Goal difference within the league, but decider play-off for qualifiers;

=== Results ===
Home \ Away	AAR	BAS	BEL	CDF	CHI	GCZ	LS	LUZ	NX	SER	SIO	STG	VEV	WET	YB	ZÜR
Aarau		4–0	8–1	1–1	3–1	0–1	2–1	2–2	0–0	1–2	0–2	1–2	7–0	2–2	0–0	4–1
Basel	0–0		5–1	0–1	4–1	0–0	1–0	5–2	4–2	3–2	1–1	4–2	5–2	0–2	2–0	3–0
Bellinzona	1–1	4–2		0–2	4–1	0–2	0–0	0–3	1–3	0–2	3–4	1–2	0–1	1–3	0–3	2–2
Chaux-de-Fonds	6–1	2–2	1–0		2–0	0–1	3–2	3–2	1–1	1–3	2–0	3–2	2–2	1–0	1–0	2–2
Chiasso	0–2	1–3	2–1	0–4		0–1	1–2	0–2	1–3	0–3	1–0	3–2	1–0	1–3	2–2	3–3
Grasshopper	4–1	4–1	1–0	4–1	2–0		4–1	3–0	3–2	0–3	2–2	1–2	3–1	3–1	3–2	1–0
Lausanne-Sports	1–1	4–0	1–0	1–0	7–2	1–1		3–1	2–0	2–2	3–3	4–0	3–1	0–0	1–0	1–1
Luzern	2–1	4–1	1–2	3–2	2–0	0–2	1–2		1–4	0–3	1–1	2–2	1–0	1–0	2–2	1–0
Neuchâtel Xamax	2–1	2–0	8–0	0–0	2–0	2–0	3–0	1–0		1–1	3–1	0–0	3–1	3–0	2–1	2–1
Servette	2–0	3–1	1–2	5–1	5–0	0–0	3–0	2–0	1–1		2–1	3–0	1–0	4–2	2–0	5–3
Sion	2–1	5–3	5–1	4–2	1–0	3–3	2–1	1–0	1–1	3–3		2–0	7–1	4–0	2–1	6–1
St. Gallen	3–2	4–2	2–0	2–2	5–1	1–1	2–0	3–0	1–1	3–0	2–1		3–1	1–0	2–1	2–0
Vevey-Sports	0–0	2–2	4–1	3–1	3–2	3–2	0–0	3–1	3–1	3–1	0–2	2–2		1–1	0–3	4–1
Wettingen	1–2	0–0	5–1	2–0	4–1	0–3	1–3	1–0	1–0	1–1	1–2	1–3	2–1		1–1	4–3
Young Boys	0–1	2–0	2–2	3–3	2–0	2–3	1–3	2–0	0–0	2–1	0–2	2–2	4–1	0–2		0–0
Zürich	2–1	2–1	2–1	1–1	5–1	3–2	1–0	1–0	1–1	0–1	0–4	0–0	3–0	0–2	0–1	

Source: rsssf.com
Legend: Blue = home team win; Yellow = draw; Red = away team win.

=== Championship play-off ===
15 June 1984
Play-off

Grasshopper Club	1 – 0 (a.e.t.)	Servette
Egli 109' (pen.)	RSSSF summary

Wankdorf Stadium, Bern
Attendance: 30,000
Referee: (Switzerland) André Daina Eclépens

== Nationalliga B ==
The first round was played on 9 August 1983. There was to be a winter break between 27 November and 25 February 1984. The season was completed on 6 June 1984. Because two teams finished level on points in 13th and 14th position, a relegation play-out match was required and this took place on 15 June at the Olympique de la Pontaise in Lausanne.

=== Teams, locations ===
Team	Town	Canton	Stadium	Capacity
FC Baden	Baden	Aargau	Esp Stadium	7,000
FC Biel-Bienne	Biel/Bienne	Bern	Stadion Gurzelen	15,000
FC Bulle	Bulle	Fribourg	Stade de Bouleyres	7,000
CS Chênois	Thônex	Geneva	Stade des Trois-Chêne	8,000
FC Fribourg	Fribourg	Fribourg	Stade Universitaire	9,000
FC Grenchen	Grenchen	Solothurn	Stadium Brühl	15,100
FC Laufen	Laufen	Basel-Landschaft	Sportplatz Nau	3,000
FC Locarno	Locarno	Ticino	Stadio comunale Lido	5,000
Lugano	Lugano	Ticino	Cornaredo Stadium	6,330
FC Martigny-Sports	Martigny	Valais	Stade d'Octodure	2,500
Mendrisiostar	Mendrisio	Ticino	Centro Sportivo Comunale	4,000
FC Monthey	Monthey	Valais	Stade Philippe Pottier	1,800
FC Nordstern Basel	Basel	Basel-Stadt	Rankhof	7,600
FC Red Star Zürich	Zürich	Zürich	Allmend Brunau	2,000
FC Winterthur	Winterthur	Zürich	Schützenwiese	8,550
Zug	Zug	Zug	Herti Allmend Stadion	6,000

=== Final league table ===
Pos	Team	Pld	W	D	L	GF	GA	GD	Pts	Qualification
1	SC Zug	30	16	9	5	64	33	+31	41	Champions and promoted to 1984–85 Nationalliga A
2	FC Winterthur	30	16	9	5	56	43	+13	41	Promoted to 1984–85 Nationalliga A
3	Lugano	30	13	12	5	59	35	+24	38	
4	FC Martigny-Sports	30	13	7	10	49	40	+9	33	
5	FC Baden	30	13	7	10	60	53	+7	33	
6	FC Bulle	30	12	7	11	48	45	+3	31	
7	Mendrisiostar	30	9	12	9	41	35	+6	30	
8	FC Locarno	30	9	11	10	44	49	−5	29	
9	CS Chênois	30	10	9	11	42	51	−9	29	
10	FC Grenchen	30	8	12	10	41	45	−4	28	
11	FC Biel-Bienne	30	8	12	10	45	51	−6	28	
12	FC Laufen	30	8	12	10	38	47	−9	28	
13	FC Monthey	30	7	10	13	34	43	−9	24	To relegation play-out
14	FC Fribourg	30	8	8	14	38	51	−13	24	To relegation play-out
15	FC Nordstern Basel	30	7	9	14	38	60	−22	23	Relegated to 1984–85 Swiss 1. Liga
16	FC Red Star Zürich	30	8	4	18	48	64	−16	20	Relegated to 1984–85 Swiss 1. Liga

Source: rsssf
Rules for classification: 1) Points; 2) Goal difference within the league, but decider play-off for qualifiers;

=== Play-out against relegation ===
The decider was played on 15 June in Olympique de la Pontaise, Lausanne.

Team 1	Score	Team 2
FC Monthey	1–1 a.e.t. 4–3 pen.	FC Fribourg

FC Monthey win after penalty shoot-out and remain in division. FC Fribourg were relegated to 1984–85 Swiss 1. Liga.

== Attendances ==
#	Club	Average
1	St. Gallen	7,660
2	Luzern	7,300
3	Xamax	6,787
4	Sion	6,773
5	Servette	6,753
6	Lausanne	6,687
7	Basel	5,553
8	GCZ	5,373
9	Zürich	5,253
10	Aarau	4,787
11	Young Boys	4,573
12	La Chaux-de-Fonds	3,960
13	Wettingen	3,293
14	Vevey	2,917
15	Bellinzona	2,147
16	Chiasso	1,353

== Further in Swiss football ==
- 1983–84 Swiss Cup
- 1983–84 Swiss 1. Liga

== Sources ==
- Switzerland 1983–84 at RSSSF

Preceded by 1982–83	Nationalliga seasons in Switzerland	Succeeded by 1984–85
