= 1984–85 Swiss 1. Liga =

1. Liga
- Season: 1984–85
- Champions: Overall champions FC Zug; Group 1: FC Le Locle; Group 2: FC Lengnau; Group 3: SC Kriens; Group 4: FC Red Star Zürich
- Promoted: FC Zug; FC Le Locle; FC Renens
- Relegated: Group 1: FC Fétigny; FC Lalden; Group 2: US Boncourt; FC Rapid Ostermundigen; Group 3: FC Littau; FC Bremgarten; FC Brugg; Group 4: FC Kreuzlingen; FC Turicum
- Matches: 4 times 182 plus 17 play-offs and 4 play-outs

The 1984–85 Swiss 1. Liga was the 53rd season of this league since its creation in 1931. At this time, the 1. Liga was the third tier of the Swiss football league system and it was the highest level of amateur football.

== Format ==
There were 56 clubs in the 1. Liga, divided into four regional groups, each with 14 teams. Within each group, the teams would play a double round-robin to decide their league position. Two points were awarded for a win. The four group winners and the four runners-up contested a first play-off round to decide three promotion slots. The two last placed teams in each group were directly relegated to the 2. Liga (fourth tier).

== Group 1 ==
=== Teams ===
Club	Canton	Stadium	Capacity
FC Echallens	Vaud	Sportplatz 3 Sapins	2,000
FC Fétigny	Fribourg	Stade Communal - Fétigny	500
FC Fribourg	Fribourg	Stade Universitaire	9,000
FC Lalden	Valais	Sportplatz Finnenbach	1,000
FC Le Locle	Neuchâtel	Installation sportive - Jeanneret	3,142
FC Leytron	Valais	Stade Saint-Martin	1,000
ES FC Malley	Vaud	Centre Sportif de la Tuilière	1,500
FC Montreux-Sports	Vaud	Stade de Chailly	1,000
FC Renens	Waadt	Zone sportive du Censuy	2,300
FC Saint-Jean GE	Geneva	Centre sportif de Varembé	3,000
FC Savièse	Valais	Stade St-Germain	2,000
FC Stade Lausanne	Vaud	Centre sportif de Vidy	1,000
FC Stade Payerne	Vaud	Stade Municipal	1,100
FC Vernier	Geneva	Stade municipal de Vernier	1,000

=== Final league table ===
Pos	Team	Pld	W	D	L	GF	GA	GD	Pts	Qualification or relegation
1	FC Le Locle	26	16	7	3	69	36	+33	39	Play-off to Nationalliga B
2	FC Renens	26	13	7	6	56	38	+18	33	Play-off to Nationalliga B
3	FC Fribourg	26	12	9	5	47	32	+15	33	
4	FC Stade Lausanne	26	14	3	9	51	36	+15	31	
5	FC Saint-Jean GE	26	10	9	7	40	33	+7	29	
6	FC Montreux-Sports	26	8	11	7	35	35	0	27	
7	FC Stade Payerne	26	6	13	7	25	28	−3	25	
8	ES FC Malley	26	8	9	9	37	42	−5	25	
9	FC Savièse	26	9	6	11	44	44	0	24	
10	FC Vernier	26	7	10	9	42	44	−2	24	
11	FC Leytron	26	8	8	10	40	44	−4	24	
12	FC Echallens	26	7	10	9	32	44	−12	24	Play-out against relegation
13	FC Fétigny	26	3	10	13	25	51	−26	16	Relegation to 2. Liga Interregional
14	FC Lalden	26	3	4	19	22	58	−36	10	Relegation to 2. Liga Interregional

Source: RSSSF
Rules for classification: 1) Points; 2) Goal difference within the league, but decider play-off for qualifiers.

== Group 2 ==
=== Teams ===
Club	Canton	Stadium	Capacity
FC Bern	Bern	Stadion Neufeld	14,000
US Boncourt	Jura	Stade Communal Léon Burrus	1,640
FC Breitenbach	Solothurn	Grien	2,000
SC Burgdorf	canton of Bern	Stadion Neumatt	3,850
FC Concordia Basel	Basel-Stadt	Stadion Rankhof	7,000
SR Delémont	Jura	La Blancherie	5,263
FC Köniz	Bern	Sportplatz Liebefeld-Hessgut	2,600
FC Langenthal	Bern	Rankmatte	2,000
FC Lengnau	Bern	Moos Lengnau BE	3,900
FC Nordstern Basel	Basel-Stadt	Rankhof	7,600
BSC Old Boys	Basel-Stadt	Stadion Schützenmatte	8,000
FC Rapid Ostermundigen	Bern	Oberfeld	1,000
FC Solothurn	Solothurn	Stadion FC Solothurn	6,750
FC Thun	Bern	Stadion Lachen	10,350

=== Final league table ===
Pos	Team	Pld	W	D	L	GF	GA	GD	Pts	Qualification or relegation
1	FC Lengnau	26	17	4	5	68	32	+36	38	Play-off to Nationalliga B
2	BSC Old Boys	26	13	7	6	53	35	+18	33	To decider for second place
3	FC Concordia Basel	26	13	7	6	49	38	+11	33	To decider for second place
4	SR Delémont	26	11	7	8	42	39	+3	29	
5	FC Köniz	26	9	10	7	37	38	−1	28	
6	FC Langenthal	26	11	4	11	49	50	−1	26	
7	SC Burgdorf	26	11	4	11	32	39	−7	26	
8	FC Breitenbach	26	9	7	10	41	45	−4	25	
9	FC Bern	26	9	7	10	34	40	−6	25	
10	FC Nordstern Basel	26	9	6	11	35	40	−5	24	
11	FC Solothurn	26	7	9	10	43	47	−4	23	
12	FC Thun	26	7	8	11	41	49	−8	22	Play-out against relegation
13	US Boncourt	26	6	9	11	34	39	−5	21	Relegation to 2. Liga Interregional
14	FC Rapid Ostermundigen	26	5	1	20	22	49	−27	11	Relegation to 2. Liga Interregional

Source: RSSSF
Rules for classification: 1) Points; 2) Goal difference within the league, but decider play-off for qualifiers.

=== Decider for second position ===
The decider was played on 21 May 1985 in the Stadion Rankhof in Basel.

Team 1	Score	Team 2
BSC Old Boys	1–1 a.e.t. 4–2 Pen.	FC Concordia Basel

BSC Old Boys win after penalty shoot-out and advance to play-offs.

== Group 3 ==
=== Teams ===
Club	Canton	Stadium	Capacity
FC Ascona	Ticino	Stadio Comunale Ascona	1,400
FC Brugg	Aargau	Stadion Au	3,300
FC Bremgarten	Aargau	Bärenmatt	2,000
SC Buochs	Nidwalden	Stadion Seefeld	5,000
FC Emmenbrücke	Lucerne	Stadion Gersag	8,700
FC Ibach	Schwyz	Gerbihof	3,300
FC Klus-Balsthal	Solothurn	Sportplatz Moos	4,000
SC Kriens	Lucerne	Stadion Kleinfeld	5,100
FC Littau	Lucerne	Ruopigen	000
FC Olten	Solothurn	Sportanlagen Kleinholz	8,000
SC Reiden	Lucerne	Kleinfeld	1,000
FC Suhr	Aargau	Hofstattmatten	2,000
FC Sursee	Lucerne	Stadion Schlottermilch	3,500
FC Zug	Zug	Herti Allmend Stadion	6,000

=== Final league table ===
Pos	Team	Pld	W	D	L	GF	GA	GD	Pts	Qualification or relegation
1	SC Kriens	26	16	8	2	54	26	+28	40	Play-off to Nationalliga B
2	FC Zug	26	16	7	3	50	23	+27	39	Play-off to Nationalliga B
3	FC Suhr	26	11	9	6	51	36	+15	31	
4	FC Sursee	26	10	10	6	56	46	+10	30	
5	FC Olten	26	11	7	8	46	28	+18	29	
6	FC Ibach	26	8	10	8	40	42	−2	26	
7	FC Klus-Balsthal	26	9	8	9	32	38	−6	26	
8	FC Emmenbrücke	26	7	11	8	39	34	+5	25	
9	SC Buochs	26	8	7	11	45	41	+4	23	
10	FC Ascona	26	5	13	8	25	29	−4	23	
11	SC Reiden	26	7	8	11	28	42	−14	22	
12	FC Brugg	26	4	10	12	28	49	−21	18	Play-out against relegation
13	FC Littau	26	7	4	15	32	62	−30	18	Relegation to 2. Liga Interregional
14	FC Bremgarten	26	4	6	16	28	58	−30	14	Relegation to 2. Liga Interregional

Source: RSSSF
Rules for classification: 1) Points; 2) Goal difference within the league, but decider play-off for qualifiers.

== Group 4 ==
=== Teams ===
Club	Canton	Stadium	Capacity
FC Altstätten (St. Gallen)	St. Gallen	Grüntal Altstätten	1,000
FC Brüttisellen	Zürich	Lindenbuck	1,000
FC Dübendorf	Zürich	Zelgli	1,500
FC Einsiedeln	Schwyz	Rappenmöösli	1,300
FC Frauenfeld	Thurgau	Kleine Allmend	6,370
FC Gossau	St. Gallen	Sportanlage Buechenwald	3,500
FC Kreuzlingen	Thurgau	Sportplatz Hafenareal	1,200
FC Küsnacht	Zürich	Sportanlage Heslibach	2,300
FC Red Star Zürich	Zürich	Allmend Brunau	2,000
FC Rorschach	Schwyz	Sportplatz Kellen	1,000
FC Rüti	Zürich	Schützenwiese	1,200
FC Stäfa	Zürich	Sportanlage Frohberg	1,500
FC Industrie Turicum	Zürich	Hardhof	1,000
FC Vaduz	Liechtenstein	Rheinpark Stadion	7,584

=== Final league table ===
Pos	Team	Pld	W	D	L	GF	GA	GD	Pts	Qualification or relegation
1	FC Red Star Zürich	26	18	8	0	51	15	+36	44	Play-off to Nationalliga B
2	FC Stäfa	26	11	11	4	36	30	+6	33	Play-off to Nationalliga B
3	FC Gossau	26	13	6	7	46	31	+15	32	
4	FC Altstätten (St. Gallen)	26	11	9	6	52	34	+18	31	
5	FC Dübendorf	26	8	11	7	31	32	−1	27	
6	FC Brüttisellen	26	10	6	10	41	38	+3	26	
7	FC Vaduz	26	7	10	9	30	36	−6	24	
8	FC Rorschach	26	7	10	9	25	31	−6	24	
9	FC Frauenfeld	26	6	11	9	29	36	−7	23	
10	FC Rüti	26	8	6	12	30	35	−5	22	
11	FC Küsnacht	26	7	8	11	20	33	−13	22	
12	FC Einsiedeln	26	7	6	13	42	49	−7	20	Play-out against relegation
13	FC Kreuzlingen	26	5	9	12	31	44	−13	19	Relegation to 2. Liga Interregional
14	FC Turicum	26	3	11	12	25	45	−20	17	Relegation to 2. Liga Interregional

Source: RSSSF
Rules for classification: 1) Points; 2) Goal difference within the league, but decider play-off for qualifiers.

== Promotion play-off ==
=== Qualification round ===
Team 1	Score	Team 2
FC Renens	3–2	FC Lengnau
FC Lengnau	0–2	FC Renens

FC Renens win 5–2 on aggregate and continue to the finals.

Team 1	Score	Team 2
FC Red Star Zürich	1–3	FC Zug
FC Zug	1–2	FC Red Star Zürich

FC Zug win 4–3 on aggregate and continue to the finals.

Team 1	Score	Team 2
BSC Old Boys	1–0	FC Le Locle
FC Le Locle	4–0	BSC Old Boys

FC Le Locle win 4–1 on aggregate and continue to the finals.

Team 1	Score	Team 2
SC Kriens	2–1	FC Stäfa
FC Stäfa	1–2	SC Kriens
SC Kriens	1–2	FC Stäfa

3–3 on aggregate. FC Stäfa win the replay and continue to the finals.

=== Semi-finals ===
Team 1	Score	Team 2
FC Le Locle	3–1	FC Stäfa
FC Stäfa	2–1	FC Le Locle

FC Le Locle win 4–3 on aggregate and are promoted to 1985–86 Nationalliga B.

Team 1	Score	Team 2
FC Zug	1–0	FC Renens
FC Renens	1–0	FC Zug
FC Zug	3–0	FC Renens

1–1 on aggregate. FC Zug the replay and are promoted to 1985–86 Nationalliga B.

=== Decider for third place ===
Team 1	Score	Team 2
FC Renens	4–0	FC Stäfa
FC Stäfa	0–4	FC Renens

FC Renens win 8–0 on aggregate and are promoted to 1985–86 Nationalliga B. FC Stäfa remain in 1. Liga.

=== Decider for 1. Liga championship ===
Team 1	Score	Team 2
FC Le Locle	2–5	FC Zug

FC Zug win and are declaied 1. Liga champion.

== Relegation play-out ==
=== First round ===
Team 1	Score	Team 2
FC Echallens	3–0	FC Thun

FC Thun continue to the play-out final.

Team 1	Score	Team 2
FC Brugg	1–5	FC Einsiedeln

FC Brugg continue to the play-out final.

=== Final round ===
Team 1	Score	Team 2
FC Brugg	3–2	FC Thun
FC Thun	2–1	FC Brugg

FC Thun win and FC Brugg are relegated to 2. Liga.

== Further in Swiss football ==
- 1984–85 Nationalliga A
- 1984–85 Nationalliga B
- 1984–85 Swiss Cup

== Sources ==
- Switzerland 1984–85 at RSSSF

Preceded by 1983–84	Seasons in Swiss 1. Liga	Succeeded by 1985–86
