= Michel Decastel =

Swiss footballer (born 1955)

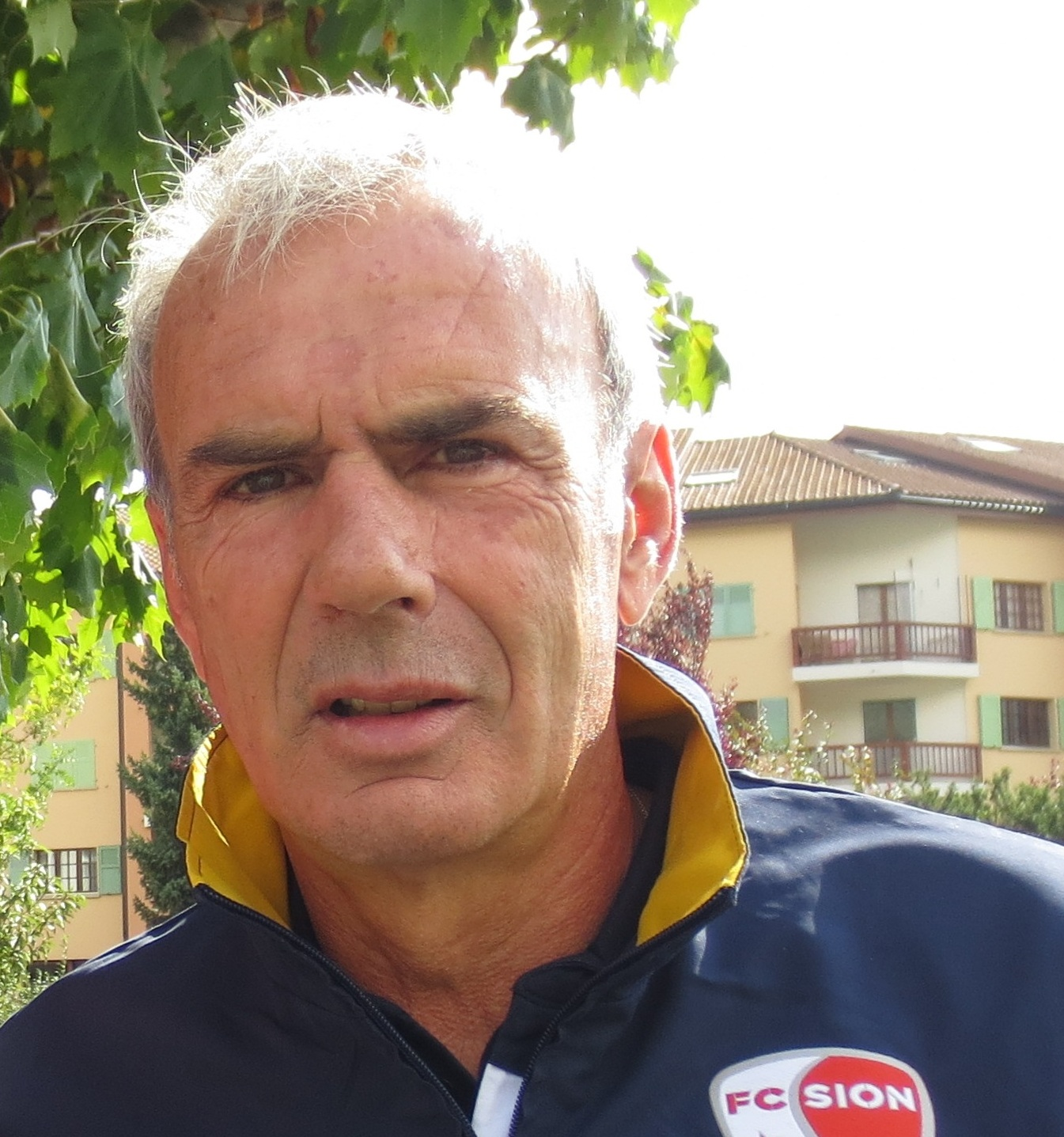

Personal information
- Date of birth: 22 October 1955 (age 71)
- Place of birth: Geneva, Switzerland
- Height: 1.76 m (5 ft 9 in)
- Position: Midfielder

Senior career*
Years	Team	Apps	(Gls)
1974–1979	Neuchâtel Xamax	31	(12)
1979–1981	Strasbourg	73	(15)
1981–1988	Servette	177	(27)
1988–1989	Neuchâtel Xamax	33	(5)
Total		314	(59)

International career
1982–1986	Switzerland	19	(0)

Managerial career
- 1994–1995: Yverdon-Sport
- 1995–1996: Sion
- 1996–1999: SR Delémont
- 1999–2001: ASEC Mimosas
- 2002–2003: Espérance de Tunis
- 2003–2004: Wydad Casablanca
- 2004–2006: Club Sfaxien
- 2006: Al Ahli
- 2007–2008: Club Sfaxien
- 2008: Étoile du Sahel
- 2009: Zamalek
- 2010: Al Dhafra
- 2011–2012: Wydad Casablanca
- 2012: Espérance de Tunis
- 2012: Sion
- 2013: Sion
- 2015–2019: Neuchâtel Xamax
- * Club domestic league appearances and goals

Michel Decastel (born 22 October 1955) is a Swiss football manager and a former midfielder. He was most recently the manager of the Swiss Challenge League club Neuchâtel Xamax.

== Honours ==
=== Player ===
Servette

- Swiss Cup: 1983–84
- Swiss Super League: 1984–85

Neuchâtel Xamax

- Swiss Super Cup: 1988

=== Manager ===
FC Sion

- Swiss Cup: 1995–96
