= Jean-Paul Brigger =

Swiss footballer and manager (born 1957)

Personal information
- Full name: Jean-Paul Brigger
- Date of birth: 14 December 1957 (age 68)
- Place of birth: St. Niklaus, Switzerland
- Height: 1.80 m (5 ft 11 in)
- Position: Striker

Senior career*
Years	Team	Apps	(Gls)
1977–1982	FC Sion	107	(40)
1982–1985	Servette	88	(54)
1985–1992	FC Sion	186	(62)

International career
1979–1988	Switzerland	35	(3)

Managerial career
- 1992–1993: FC Sion
- 1994–1997: FC Luzern
- * Club domestic league appearances and goals

Jean-Paul Brigger (born 14 December 1957) is a Swiss football manager and former player who played as a football striker. He played for the most of his career with FC Sion.

Aside from FC Sion, Brigger played for Servette and represented the Swiss national team. After retiring, he had a spell managing FC Sion and FC Luzern.

Since 1999, he has worked for FIFA as a member of its technical study and development group.

== Honours ==
- Swiss National League - 1984–85, 1991–92
- Swiss Cup - 1979–80, 1981–82, 1983–84, 1985–86, 1990–91
- Swiss National League Top Scorer - 1982-83
- Swiss Footballer of the Year - 1991-92
