= 1984–85 Nationalliga A =

Swiss football season

Nationalliga A
- Season: 1984–85
- Champions: Servette
- Relegated: SC Zug; Winterthur
- Top goalscorer: Dominique Cina (Sion) 24 goals

Nationalliga B
- Season: 1984–85
- Champions: Grenchen
- Promoted: Grenchen; Baden
- Relegated: Mendrisiostar; Yverdon-Sport; Monthey
- Top goalscorer: Vittorio Allegretti (Baden) 18 goals

Statistics of the Swiss National League in the 1984–85 football season, both Nationalliga A and Nationalliga B. This was the 88th season of top-tier and the 87th season of second-tier football in Switzerland.

== Overview ==
There were 32 member clubs in the Swiss Football Association (ASF/SFV), divided into two tiers of 16 teams each. The top tier was named Nationalliga A (NLA) and the second tier was named Nationalliga B (NLB). In both divisions the teams played a double round-robin to decide their table positions. The Swiss champions would qualify for the 1985–86 European Cup, the runners-up and third placed team would qualify for the 1985–86 UEFA Cup. The last two placed teams in the NLA were relegated to the NLB for the following season. The top two placed teams in the NLB would be promoted to the top tier. The last three teams in the NLB were relegated to next season's 1. Liga.

== Nationalliga A ==
The first round was played on 15 August 1984. There was to be a winter break between 9 December and 2 March 1985. The season was completed on 19 June 1986.

=== Teams, Locations ===
Team	Town	Canton	Stadium	Capacity
Aarau	Aarau	Aargau	Stadion Brügglifeld	9,240
Basel	Basel	Basel-Stadt	St. Jakob Stadium	36,800
Grasshopper Club	Zürich	Zürich	Hardturm	20,000
La Chaux-de-Fonds	La Chaux-de-Fonds	Neuchâtel	Centre Sportif de la Charrière	12,700
Lausanne-Sports	Lausanne	Vaud	Pontaise	15,700
Luzern	Lucerne	Lucerne	Stadion Allmend	25,000
St. Gallen	St. Gallen	St. Gallen	Espenmoos	11,000
Servette	Geneva	Geneva	Stade des Charmilles	27,000
Sion	Sion	Valais	Stade de Tourbillon	16,000
Vevey-Sports	Vevey	Vaud	Stade de Copet	4,000
Wettingen	Wettingen	Aargau	Stadion Altenburg	10,000
FC Winterthur	Winterthur	Zürich	Schützenwiese	8,550
Xamax	Neuchâtel	Neuchâtel	Stade de la Maladière	25,500
Young Boys	Bern	Bern	Wankdorf Stadium	56,000
Zug	Zug	Zug	Herti Allmend Stadion	6,000
Zürich	Zürich	Zürich	Letzigrund	25,000

=== Final league table ===
Pos	Team	Pld	W	D	L	GF	GA	GD	Pts	Qualification
1	Servette	30	19	8	3	71	28	+43	46	Swiss Champions qualified for 1985–86 European Cup
2	Aarau	30	16	10	4	62	43	+19	42	Swiss Cup winners qualified for 1985–86 Cup Winners' Cup and entered 1985 Intertoto Cup
3	Xamax	30	14	11	5	59	34	+25	39	Qualified for 1985–86 UEFA Cup
4	St. Gallen	30	13	11	6	66	32	+34	37	Qualified for 1985–86 UEFA Cup and entered 1985 Intertoto Cup
5	Sion	30	14	8	8	56	49	+7	36	Entered 1985 Intertoto Cup
6	Grasshopper Club	30	11	10	9	53	47	+6	32	
7	Zürich	30	11	9	10	59	52	+7	31	
8	Basel	30	11	9	10	46	49	−3	31	
9	Young Boys	30	10	10	10	42	45	−3	30	Entered 1985 Intertoto Cup
10	Lausanne-Sport	30	10	9	11	50	57	−7	29	
11	Wettingen	30	7	12	11	31	35	−4	26	
12	Luzern	30	9	8	13	33	53	−20	26	
13	Vevey-Sports	30	9	6	15	40	47	−7	24	
14	La Chaux-de-Fonds	30	6	12	12	41	54	−13	24	
15	SC Zug	30	4	6	20	27	71	−44	14	Relegated to 1985–86 Nationalliga B
16	Winterthur	30	4	5	21	32	72	−40	13	Relegated to 1985–86 Nationalliga B

Source: rsssf.com
Rules for classification: 1) Points; 2) Goal difference; 3) Goals scored; 4) Head-to-head points; 5) Away goals scored; 6) Draw.

=== Results ===
Home \ Away	AAR	BAS	CDF	GCZ	LS	LUZ	NX	SER	SIO	STG	VEV	WET	WIN	YB	ZUG	ZÜR
Aarau		1–0	1–0	1–1	3–2	3–1	0–3	3–1	2–2	4–2	2–1	1–0	2–1	2–2	3–3	1–1
Basel	0–1		4–1	2–0	6–2	4–1	1–3	0–3	1–1	1–5	2–1	0–0	3–2	1–0	3–0	1–1
Chaux-de-Fonds	5–4	1–1		1–4	0–0	0–1	2–2	0–6	4–0	0–0	0–0	0–1	2–0	1–1	2–2	3–2
Grasshopper	2–2	3–0	3–1		2–2	2–1	0–2	0–0	2–0	2–0	5–0	1–1	3–1	2–0	2–1	2–2
Lausanne-Sports	0–0	1–0	1–4	2–0		3–2	2–2	0–2	5–4	1–1	4–2	2–0	3–2	1–1	3–0	3–0
Luzern	1–2	1–1	1–1	0–0	2–4		3–2	1–1	3–3	1–1	2–1	1–0	2–1	1–2	1–0	1–0
Neuchâtel Xamax	0–1	0–0	4–1	4–4	2–0	4–0		1–1	3–0	3–2	1–1	0–0	0–0	4–0	2–1	5–2
Servette	4–2	4–0	2–0	3–1	3–1	4–0	5–2		4–0	2–0	5–1	1–3	5–0	3–1	0–0	2–1
Sion	2–2	1–1	2–0	3–0	2–1	2–3	1–2	8–2		1–4	2–1	0–0	1–0	1–0	1–1	2–1
St. Gallen	2–2	4–0	2–2	6–1	1–1	1–1	1–2	1–2	1–1		3–0	2–0	5–1	5–1	3–0	4–0
Vevey-Sports	2–3	3–3	3–0	1–3	5–1	0–1	0–0	0–0	3–4	0–0		2–0	1–0	2–1	4–1	2–0
Wettingen	1–3	2–3	1–1	2–2	3–1	0–1	0–0	0–0	1–3	0–0	2–0		1–1	1–1	3–0	3–3
Winterthur	1–6	1–2	1–5	2–2	1–1	4–0	0–3	0–2	1–2	1–3	0–2	0–2		1–1	3–1	4–2
Young Boys	2–2	0–0	2–1	4–3	3–0	1–0	3–2	1–1	0–2	1–1	1–0	4–0	1–2		4–2	1–1
Zug	0–3	3–4	2–2	2–1	2–1	1–0	0–0	0–2	0–2	0–4	0–2	0–3	2–0	0–2		1–5
Zürich	1–0	3–2	1–1	1–0	2–2	5–1	3–1	1–1	1–3	1–2	1–0	2–1	7–1	3–1	6–2	

Source: rsssf.com
Legend: Blue = home team win; Yellow = draw; Red = away team win.

== Nationalliga B ==
The first round was played on 15 August 1984. There was to be a winter break between 9 December and 3 March 1985. The season was completed on 19 June 1986.

=== Teams, locations ===
Team	Town	Canton	Stadium	Capacity
FC Baden	Baden	Aargau	Esp Stadium	7,000
Bellinzona	Bellinzona	Ticino	Stadio Comunale Bellinzona	5,000
FC Biel-Bienne	Biel/Bienne	Bern	Stadion Gurzelen	15,000
FC Bulle	Bulle	Fribourg	Stade de Bouleyres	7,000
Étoile Carouge FC	Geneva	Geneva	Stade de la Fontenette	3,690
CS Chênois	Thônex	Geneva	Stade des Trois-Chêne	8,000
Chiasso	Chiasso	Ticino	Stadio Comunale Riva IV	4,000
FC Grenchen	Grenchen	Solothurn	Stadium Brühl	15,100
FC Laufen	Laufen	Basel-Landschaft	Sportplatz Nau	3,000
FC Locarno	Locarno	Ticino	Stadio comunale Lido	5,000
Lugano	Lugano	Ticino	Cornaredo Stadium	6,330
FC Martigny-Sports	Martigny	Valais	Stade d'Octodure	2,500
Mendrisiostar	Mendrisio	Ticino	Centro Sportivo Comunale	4,000
FC Monthey	Monthey	Valais	Stade Philippe Pottier	1,800
FC Schaffhausen	Schaffhausen	Schaffhausen	Stadion Breite	7,300
Yverdon-Sport FC	Yverdon-les-Bains	Vaud	Stade Municipal	6,600

=== Final league table ===
Pos	Team	Pld	W	D	L	GF	GA	GD	Pts	Qualification
1	FC Grenchen	30	15	10	5	55	28	+27	40	Promotion to 1985–86 Nationalliga A
2	FC Baden	30	17	6	7	61	41	+20	40	Promotion to 1985–86 Nationalliga A
3	Etoile Carouge FC	30	16	5	9	58	40	+18	37	
4	FC Biel-Bienne	30	14	9	7	58	43	+15	37	
5	FC Schaffhausen	30	13	9	8	47	41	+6	35	
6	Lugano	30	13	8	9	53	36	+17	34	
7	FC Bulle	30	13	8	9	46	38	+8	34	
8	FC Martigny-Sports	30	12	9	9	61	47	+14	33	
9	FC Locarno	30	10	11	9	42	37	+5	31	
10	CS Chênois	30	12	7	11	45	44	+1	31	
11	FC Chiasso	30	12	5	13	44	42	+2	29	
12	AC Bellinzona	30	9	11	10	47	52	−5	29	
13	FC Laufen	30	9	11	10	41	48	−7	29	
14	Mendrisiostar	30	11	6	13	39	37	+2	28	Relegation to 1985–86 1. Liga
15	Yverdon-Sport FC	30	3	3	24	29	84	−55	9	Relegation to 1985–86 1. Liga
16	FC Monthey	30	1	2	27	30	98	−68	4	Relegation to 1985–86 1. Liga

Source: rsssf.com
Rules for classification: 1) Points; 2) Goal difference; 3) Goals scored; 4) Head-to-head points; 5) Away goals scored; 6) Draw.

== Attendances ==
#	Club	Average
1	St. Gallen	7,067
2	Aarau	6,480
3	Servette	5,860
4	Luzern	5,850
5	Xamax	5,530
6	Sion	5,513
7	Lausanne	4,677
8	Zürich	4,613
9	Young Boys	4,547
10	GCZ	3,845
11	Basel	3,773
12	Winterthur	2,750
13	Wettingen	2,470
14	Zug	2,430
15	Vevey	2,373
16	La Chaux-de-Fonds	2,267

== Further in Swiss football ==
- 1984–85 Swiss Cup
- 1984–85 Swiss 1. Liga

== Sources ==
- Switzerland 1984–85 at RSSSF

Preceded by 1983–84	Nationalliga seasons in Switzerland	Succeeded by 1985–86
