= Zug 94 =

Swiss football club

- Full name: Zug 94
- Founded: 1994; 32 years ago
- Ground: Herti Allmend Stadion; Zug, Switzerland
- Capacity: 6,000
- Chairman: Flemming Ornskov
- Manager: David Cos-Gayon
- League: 1. Liga Classic
- 2024–25: 2. Liga Interregional Group 3, 1st of 16 (promoted)
Home colours	Away colours

Zug 94 is a Swiss football team based in Zug, in the Canton of Zug. The team competes in the 1. Liga Classic from 2025–26, the fourth tier of Swiss football after promotion from 2. Liga Interregional in 2024–25. It was formed in 1994 after a merger between SC Zug and FC Zug.

During the summer of 1983, Ottmar Hitzfeld signed his first coaching contract with the former SC Zug, at that time in the second tier of Swiss football. The team ended the 1983–84 season as Nationalliga B champions. Thus Hitzfeld and his team achieved immediate promotion to the Nationalliga A, for the first and only time in the club's history.

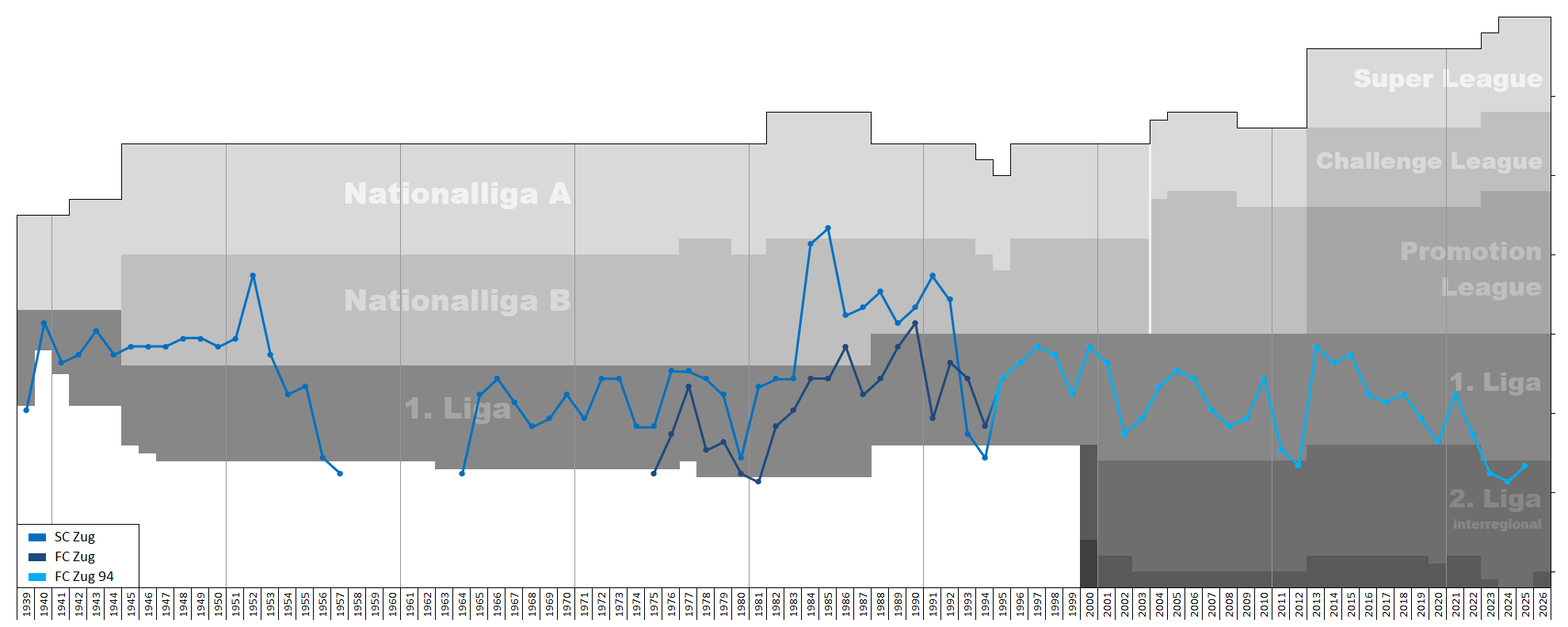
Chart of Zug 94 and its predecessors' table positions in the Swiss football league system

== Current squad ==
As of 10 April, 2026

Note: Flags indicate national team as defined under FIFA eligibility rules; some limited exceptions apply. Players may hold more than one non-FIFA nationality.

No.	Pos.	Nation	Player
1	GK	SUI	Matthias Grob
2	DF	BRA	Luiz Dorea
3	DF	BRA	Lucas Claser
4	DF	SUI	Sandro Inderbitzin
5	DF	SUI	Cleric Njau
6	MF	BRA	Alan Nabarro
7	DF	KOS	Meriton Kastrati
8	MF	BRA	Gustavo Campello
9	FW	SUI	Bojan Saponja
10	FW	SUI	Dein Barreiro
11	DF	SUI	Marco Trachsel
12	MF	SUI	Leandro Schnarwiler
14	DF	SUI	Matteo Büeler

No.	Pos.	Nation	Player
16	FW	SUI	Ardi Molliqaj
17	MF	KOS	Taulant Limani
18	MF	SUI	Mihael Cavar
19	FW	SUI	Diego Martin
20	MF	SUI	Christopher Teichmann
21	MF	ITA	Simone Campisi
22	DF	KOS	Pashk Nikollaj
23	DF	SUI	Fuat Sulimani
24	GK	POR	Álvaro Ramalho
25	GK	LAT	Nikita Vanins
26	MF	SUI	Joel Miranda
27	DF	SUI	Leotrim Nitaj
30	FW	SUI	Sead Selishta
