= 1980–81 FC Basel season =

FC Basel
1980–81 season
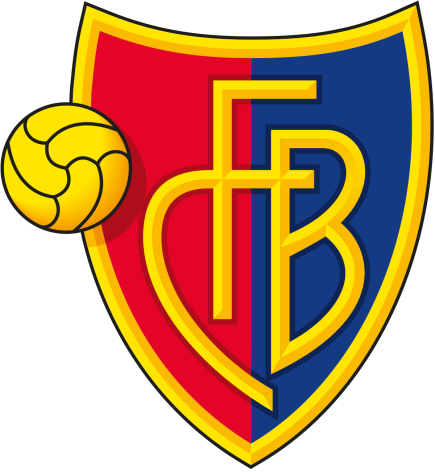
- Chairman: Pierre Jacques Lieblich
- Manager: Helmut Benthaus
- Ground: St. Jakob Stadium, Basel
- Nationalliga A: Sixth
- Swiss Cup: Quarter-final
- Swiss League Cup: Round 1
- European Cup: Round of 16
- Top goalscorer: League: Erni Maissen (10); All: Erni Maissen (14)
- Highest home attendance: 17,500 on 11 April 1981 vs Grasshopper Club
- Lowest home attendance: 4,000 on 11 October 1980 vs Sion and on 25 October 1980 vs Servette
- Average home league attendance: 6,630

The Fussball Club Basel 1893 1980–81 season was their 87th season since the club was founded. It was their 35th consecutive season in the top flight of Swiss football after they won promotion during the season 1945–46. They played their home games in the St. Jakob Stadium. Pierre Jacques Lieblich was voted as new club chairman, he replaced René Theler who stood down at the AGM.

== Overview ==
=== Pre-season ===
Helmut Benthaus was first team manager for the sixteenth consecutive season. There were only a few changes in the squad this off-season. Erwin Meyer moved on to Luzern and Robert Baldinger moved to lower tier Aarau. Serge Duvernois joined from Saint Louis and Martin Mullis joined from St. Gallen. All other mutations were internal between the first team and the reserves.

Basel played a total of 52 games in their 1980–81 season. 26 matches were played in the domestic league, three in the Swiss Cup, one in the Swiss League Cup, four in the 1980–81 European Cup and 18 were friendly matches. The team scored a total of 115 goals and conceded 71. Of their 18 test games, 10 were won, five were drawn and three ended with a defeat. Three of these games were played at home in St. Jakob Stadium, the others were played away from home. In the pre-season Basel played three games in Germany and during the winter break they played three games in Singapore and Malaysia.

=== Domestic league ===
Basel played in the 1980–81 Nationalliga A. The league had been reformed and there were no more championship play-offs. Basel played a mediocre season and ended the Nationalliga in sixth position, 12 points behind Zürich who became champions. In their 26 league games Basel won nine, drew ten and lost seven matches, which meant that the totaled 28 points. They scored 48 goals, conceding 44. Erni Maissen was the team's top goalscorer scoring ten league goals. Markus Tanner was second best scorer with six goals.

=== Swiss Cup and League Cup ===
Basel entered the Swiss Cup in the round of 32. Here they were drawn away against Fribourg and they won the match 3–0. In the round of 16 they were drawn at home against Martigny-Sports and this match was won 6–0. In the quarterfinal, on 28 March 1981, Basel were drawn to play away from home against Zürich in the Letzigrund. The hosts won the tie 3–0. Basel were out of the competition and Zürich continued on to the final and won the trophy. In first round of the Swiss League Cup Basel were also drawn away against Zürich. They lost the home game 1–2 and Zürich continued in this competition and won this trophy as well.

=== European Cup ===
As reigning Swiss champions Basel were qualified for the 1980–81 European Cup. In the first round they were drawn against Club Brugge. The first leg was played in Jan Breydel Stadium in Bruges and Basel won 1–0 through a goal scored by Erni Maissen in 65th minute. The return leg was won 4–1, the goals coming from Markus Tanner (14), Jörg Stohler (48), Arthur von Wartburg (55) and Walter Geisser (81) after Brugge had taken an early lead through Jan Ceulemans (3), but their goalkeeper Leen Barth was sent off in the 17th minute. In the second round Basel were drawn against Red Star Belgrade. Basel decided the first leg for themselves 1–0, the goal scored by Detlev Lauscher. In the second leg, however, Basel were defeated 0–2 and were eliminated from the competition.

== Players ==
Note: Flags indicate national team as defined under FIFA eligibility rules; some limited exceptions apply. Players may hold more than one non-FIFA nationality.

No.	Pos.	Nation	Player
1	GK	SUI	Hans Küng
2	DF	SUI	Walter Geisser
3	DF	FRA	Serge Duvernois (from Saint Louis)
4	MF	SUI	Ernst Schleiffer
5	DF	SUI	René Hasler
6	MF	SUI	Otto Demarmels
7	FW	SUI	Peter Marti
8	MF	SUI	Markus Tanner
9	FW	SUI	Joseph Küttel
10	MF	SUI	Arthur von Wartburg
11	FW	GER	Detlev Lauscher

No.	Pos.	Nation	Player
12	DF	SUI	Jean-Pierre Maradan
13	DF	SUI	Stefano Ceccaroni (reserves)
14	DF	SUI	Jörg Stohler
15	MF	SUI	Martin Mullis (from St. Gallen)
16	MF	SUI	Hansruedi Schär
17	DF	FRA	Serge Gaisser
18	MF	SUI	Erni Maissen
22	GK	SUI	Hans Müller
—	DF	SUI	René Zingg
—	MF	SUI	Martin Jeitziner

Players who left the squad

Note: Flags indicate national team as defined under FIFA eligibility rules; some limited exceptions apply. Players may hold more than one non-FIFA nationality.

No.	Pos.	Nation	Player
—	MF	SUI	Robert Baldinger (to Aarau)
—	DF	SUI	Rolf Schönauer

No.	Pos.	Nation	Player
—	MF	SUI	Erwin Meyer (to Luzern)
—	DF	GER	Manfred Jungk

== Results ==
Legend

Win Draw Loss Postponed

=== Friendly matches ===
==== Pre- and mid-season ====
23 July 1980 Pre-season	Stuttgarter Kickers (Germany)	3–1	(Switzerland) Basel	Stuttgart
	Nickel (1:0); Voise (2:0); Dreher (3:1)	FCB summary	(2:1) Lauscher	Attendance: 2,000

25 July 1980 Pre-season	VfB Eppingen (Germany)	1–2	(Switzerland) Basel	Hugo-Koch-Stadion, Eppingen
	Sterz 37' (1:1); Gebhardt (penalty missed) 61′	FCB summary	32' (0:1) Mullis; 88' (1:2) Maissen	Attendance: 1,500
Note: 61st Minute, Eppingen's goalkeeper Gebhardt shot the penalty which rebounded from the crossbar.

27 July 1980 Pre-season	SC Freiburg (Germany)	2–2	(Switzerland) Basel	Alemannenstadion, Maulburg
18:00	(1:0) (2:2)	FCB summary	38' (1:1) Tanner; 86' (1:2) Marti	Attendance: 2,500

31 July 1980 Pre-season	Luzern (Switzerland)	2–3	(Switzerland) Basel	Wolfwil
20:00	Fischer 20' (1:0); Gaisser 35' (o.g. 0:2)	FCB summary	(2:1) Lauscher; 67' (2:2) Lauscher; 87' (2:3) Schär	Attendance: 2,000; Referee: (Switzerland) Peter Scherz (Aegerten)
Note: Exhibition game as part of the 50th anniversary celebrations of FC Wolfwil, the Solothurn 3. Liga club.

1 August 1980 Uhrencup semi-final	Basel (Switzerland)	6–0	(Switzerland) Biel-Bienne	Stadion Brühl, Grenchen
18:00	Hasler 13' (1:0); Marti 26' (2:0); Maissen 43' (3:0); Belafatti 55' (4:0); Maissen 63' (5:0); Hasler 81' (6:0)	FCB summary		Attendance: 1,100; Referee: (Switzerland) Manfred Schlup, (Grenchen)
Note: The Uhrencup is a former club football tournament that was held annually in Grenchen in Switzerland.

6 August 1980 Uhrencup Final	Grenchen (Switzerland)	1–5	(Switzerland) Basel	Stadion Brühl, Grenchen
20:15	Bregy 68' (1:5)	FCB summary	6' (0:1) Demarmels; 18' (0:2) von Wartburg; 31' (0:3) Tanner; 39' (0:4) Küttel; 43' (0:5) Marti	Attendance: 4,500; Referee: (Switzerland) Alfred Heinis (Ammannsegg, Biberist)
Note: The Uhrencup is a former club football tournament that was held annually in Grenchen in Switzerland.

10 August 1980 Pre-season	Xamax (Switzerland)	2–0	(Switzerland) Basel	Oensingen
15:30	Pellegrini 19' (1:0); Lüthi 84' (2:0)	FCB summary		Attendance: 950; Referee: (Switzerland) Hauri
Note: Corners: 4:10

12 August 1980 Philips Cup semi-final	Young Boys (Switzerland)	1–3	(Switzerland) Basel	Wankdorf Stadium, Bern
20:30	Schönenberger 63' (1:3)	FCB summary	7' (0:1) Hasler; 11' (0:2) Lauscher; 14' (0:3) Küttel	Attendance: 5,000; Referee: (Switzerland) Werner Bösch (Sutz-Lattrigen)

19 August 1980 Philips Cup, Final	Basel (Switzerland)	7–2	(Switzerland) Zürich	Wankdorf Stadium, Bern
20:30	Marti 31' (1:1); Gaisser 33' (2:1); Schär 44' (3:1); Schär 47' (4:1); Schär 58' (5:1); Marti 66' (6:1); Küttel 68' (7:1)	FCZ summary FCB summary	25' (0:1) Zappa; 74' (7:2) Seiler	Attendance: 4,000; Referee: (Switzerland) Jean-Marie Macheret, (Rueyres-St-Laurent)
Note: Philips Cup Final

14 October 1980 Mid-season	Bulle (Switzerland)	1–1	(Switzerland) Basel	Stade de Bouleyres, Bulle
	Blanchard (1:1)	FCB summary	33' (0:1) von Wartburg	Attendance: 2,000; Referee: (Switzerland) Willy Hänni
Note: Match for the Pax Fairbest Challenge Cup.

1 November 1980 Mid-season	Basel (Switzerland)	2–2	(Switzerland) Kriens	St. Jakob Stadium, Basel
15:00	Maissen 73' (1:2); Maissen 85' (2:2)	FCB summary	61' (0:1) Rhyn; 70' (0:2) Foschini	Attendance: 200; Referee: (Switzerland) Rolf Blattmann (Zeiningen)

==== Winter break ====
12 January 1981 Winter break	Singapore XI	1–1	(Switzerland) Basel	Singapore
	(1x)	FCB summary	(1x) Maissen	Attendance: 16,000
Note: Match as Exhibition game during the trainings camp.

14 January 1981 Winter break	Malaysia XI	0–4	(Switzerland) Basel	Malaysia
		FCB summary	48' (0:1) Gaisser; 58' (0:2) Gaisser; 83' (0:3) Maissen; 89' (0:4) Demarmels	Attendance: 15,000
Note: Match as Exhibition game during the trainings camp.

21 January 1981 Winter break	Penang XI (Malaysia)	1–2	(Switzerland) Basel	Penang, Malaysia
	(1x)	FCB summary	(1x) Tanner (1x) Lauscher	Attendance: 4,500
Note: Match as Exhibition game during the trainings camp.

12 February 1981 Winter break	FC Allschwil (Switzerland)	1–6	(Switzerland) Basel	Gartenhof, Allschwil
	Schnetzer 75' (1:5)	FCB summary	7' (0:1) von Wartburg; 13' (0:2) Lauscher; 23' (0:3) Tanner; 25' (0:4) Gaisser; 50' (0:5) Gaisser; 82' (1:6) Demarmels	Attendance: 500; Referee: (Switzerland) Pfister

14 February 19814 Winter break	Nordstern Basel (Switzerland)	2–1	(Switzerland) Basel	Stadion Rankhof, Basel
	Zbinden 5' (1:0); Kaufmann 27' (2:0)	FCB summary	81' (2:1) Lauscher	Attendance: 500; Referee: (Switzerland) Ernst Dörflinger (Basel)

18 February 1981 Winter break	Basel (Switzerland)	2–2	(Italy) SSC Napoli	St. Jakob Stadium, Basel
19:30	Geisser 30' (1:0); Mullis 60' (2:2)	FCB summary	44' (1:1) Capone; 45' (1:2) Capone	Attendance: 10,000; Referee: (Switzerland) Rudolf Renggli (Stans and Luzern)
Note: Charity match for the earthquake victims in southern Italy

21 February 1981 Winter break	Basel (Switzerland)	3–1	(Switzerland) Luzern	St. Jakob Stadium, Basel
	von Wartburg 36' (1:0); Küttel 40' (2:0); Schär 47' (3:0)	FCB summary	61' (pen. 3:1) Risi	Attendance: 600; Referee: (Switzerland) Bruno Burgener

=== Nationalliga A ===
==== Matches ====
23 August 1980 Round 1	Young Boys	3–1	Basel	Wankdorf Stadium, Bern
20:00	R. Müller 56' (1:0); Schönenberger 67' (2:1); Schönenberger 74' (3:1); Schönenberger (yellow card) 80'	FCB summary	61' (1:1) Maissen	Attendance: 11,500; Referee: (Switzerland) Gottlieb Barmettler (Luzern)
Note: Corners: 4:6

30 August 1980 Round 2	Basel	0–0	Chênois	St. Jakob Stadium, Basel
20:00		FCB summary		Attendance: 4,500; Referee: (Switzerland) Renzo Peduzzi (Roveredo)

6 September 1980 Round 3	Zürich	1–3	Basel	Letzigrund, Zürich
20:00	Erba (yellow card) 37'; Zwicker (yellow card) 55'; Zwicker 56' (1:2); Elsener (yellow card) 58'	FCZ summarx Summary	18' (0:1) Marti; 39' (0:2) Stohler; (yellow card) 76' von Wartburg; 89' (1:3) Maradan	Attendance: 11,000; Referee: (Switzerland) Bruno Galler (Kirchdorf, Bern)
Note: The FCZ team congratulated FC Basel on winning the championship with a bouquet of flowers. René Hasler, who played his 350th National League championship match, also received a bouquet of flowers.

13 September 1980 Round 4	Basel	1–0	St. Gallen	St. Jakob Stadium, Basel
20:00	Maissen 50' (1:0)	FCB summary		Attendance: 7,500; Referee: (Switzerland) Rudolf Affolter
Note: St. Gallen head-coach Willy Sommer (200th league match) and René Hasler (350 NL league games) were honored before the match.

20 September 1980 Round 5	Chiasso	3–0	Basel	Stadio Comunale Riva IV, Chiasso
20:00	Bevilacqua 41' (1:0); Untersee (yellow card) 43'; Manzoni 51' (2:0); Rehmann 74' (3:0)	FCB summary		Attendance: 4,000; Referee: (Switzerland) Alfred Heinis (Ammannsegg, Biberist)
Note: Corners: 5:10

4 October 1980 Round 6	Grasshopper Club	2–2	Basel	Hardturm, Zürich
20:00	Egli 24' (1:1); Meier (penalty missed) 71′ Egli 84' (2:2); Hermann (yellow card)	FCB summary	17' (0:1) Küttel; 44' (1:2) Küttel; (yellow card) Demarmels; (yellow card) Küttel	Attendance: 11,800; Referee: (Switzerland) Renzo Peduzzi (Roveredo)
Note: 71st minute Küng held the penalty shot from Bigi Meier.

8 October 1980 Round 7	Basel	3–2	Lausanne-Sport	St. Jakob Stadium, Basel
20:00	Küttel 5' (1:0); Küttel 53' (2:0); Maissen 69' (3:2); Stohler (yellow card)	FCB summary	22' (2:1) Mauron; 57' (2:2) Kok; (yellow card) Bamert; (yellow card) Lei-Ravello	Attendance: 4,500; Referee: (Switzerland) Bruno Galler (Kirchdorf, Bern)

11 October 1980 Round 8	Basel	4–1	Sion	St. Jakob Stadium, Basel
20:00	Stohler 19' (1:0); Maissen 23' (2:0); Küttel 48' (3:0); Marti 60' (4:1)	FCB summary	49' (3:1) Saunier	Attendance: 4,000; Referee: (Switzerland) Peter Scherz (Aegerten)

18 October 1979 Round 9	Xamax	3–2	Basel	Stade de la Maladière (1924), Neuchâtel
20:00	Bianchi 8' (1:0); Trinchero 21' (pen. 2:1); Guillou 62' (3:1); Favre (yellow card)	FCB summary	14' (1:1) Marti; 66' (pen. 3:2) Stohler; (yellow card) Maradan	Attendance: 6,200; Referee: (Switzerland) Walter Nussbaumer (Crans-près-Céligny)

25 October 1980 Round 10	Basel	2–2	Servette	St. Jakob Stadium, Basel
20:00	Tanner 44' (1:0); Lauscher 76' (2:2)	FCB summary	55' (1:1) Zwygart; 74' (1:2) Zwygart	Attendance: 4,000; Referee: (Switzerland) Rudolf Renggli (Stans and Luzern)
Note: Deep and heavy pitch conditions. Corners: 2:8

15 November 1980 Round 11	Luzern	3–1	Basel	Stadion Allmend, Luzern
17:00	Risi 6' (1:0); L. Kaufmann (yellow card) 26'; Hitzfeld 66' (2:1); Risi 84' (3:1)	FCB summary	8' (1:1) Maissen; (yellow card) 51' Schär	Attendance: 8,200; Referee: (Switzerland) André Daina (Éclépens)
Note: Deep and heavy pitch conditions. Corners: 3:2.

23 November 1980 Round 12	Basel	4–0	Bellinzona	St. Jakob Stadium, Basel
14:30	Demarmels 18' (1:0); Marti 35' (2:0); Tanner 42' (3:0); Tanner 81' (4:0)	FCB summary	(yellow card) Weidle	Attendance: 4,500; Referee: (Switzerland) Marino Paggiola (Appenzell)

7 December 1980 Round 13	Nordstern Basel	1–2	Basel	Stadion Rankhof, Basel
14:30	Mata (yellow card) 71'; Kälin 77' (1:2)	FCB summary	68' (0:1) Maissen; 75' (0:2) Demarmels	Attendance: 6,500; Referee: (Switzerland) Renzo Peduzzi (Roveredo)

1 March 1981 Round 14	Basel	2–2	Young Boys	St. Jakob Stadium, Basel
14:30	Maissen 24' (1:1); Lauscher 68' (2:2)	FCB summary	15' (0:1) Brodard; 57' (1:2) Berkemeier; (yellow card) Baur	Attendance: 6,000; Referee: (Switzerland) Rudolf Renggli (Stans and Luzern)
Note: Corners: 8:1

8 March 1981 Round 15	Chênois	2–2	Basel	Stade des Trois-Chêne, Thônex
14:30	Lopez 73' (1:2); Michel 81' (2:2)	FCB summary	15' (0:1) Lauscher; 46' (0:2) Mullis	Attendance: 1,200; Referee: (Switzerland) Werner Bösch (Sutz-Lattrigen)

15 March 1981 Round 16	Basel	2–0	Zürich	St. Jakob Stadium, Basel
14:30	Tanner 56' (1:0); Marti 90' (2:0)	FCZ summary FCB summary	(yellow card) 56' Jerković; (yellow card) 88' Seiler; (yellow card) 88' Zwicker	Attendance: 13,500; Referee: (Switzerland) Jakob Baumann (Schaffhausen)
Note: Corners 5:10

21 March 1981 Round 17	St. Gallen	1–2	Basel	Espenmoos, St. Gallen
17:30	Friberg 34' (1:0)	FCB summary	(yellow card) 33' von Wartburg; 52' (1:1) Marti; (yellow card) 61' Maissen; (yellow card) 65' Lauscher; 89' (1:2)	Attendance: 11,000; Referee: (Switzerland) Jean-Marie Macheret, (Rueyres-St-Laurent)
Note: Fairly good, but still soft, “sticky” terrain. Corners: 6:4.

5 April 1981 Round 18	Basel	3–0	Chiasso	St. Jakob Stadium, Basel
14:30	Ceccaroni 19' (1:0); Maissen 30' (2:0); Tanner 38' (3:0)	FCB summary	(yellow card) 53' Rehmann	Attendance: 4,200; Referee: (Switzerland) Georges Sandoz (Corcelles-Cormondrèche, Neuchâtel)
Note: Corners 13:5

11 April 1981 Round 19	Basel	1–5	Grasshopper Club	St. Jakob Stadium, Basel
20:00	Tanner 14' (1:0); Maradan (yellow card) 55'; Marti (yellow card) 72'	FCB summary	(yellow card) 2' Herbert Hermann; 24' (1:1) Pfister; 44' (1:2) Egli; (yellow card) 59' Heinz Hermann; 65' (1:3) Sulser; 67' (1:4) Wehrli; 76' (1:5) Zanetti	Attendance: 17,500; Referee: (Switzerland) André Daina (Éclépens)
Note: Corners: 4:3

24 April 1981 Round 20	Sion	1–1	Basel	Stade Tourbillon, Sion
20:30	Richard 29' (1:0); Valentini (yellow card) 62'	FCB summary	(yellow card) 51' Maissen; 89' (1:1) Ceccaroni	Attendance: 4,500; Referee: (Switzerland) Werner Bösch (Sutz-Lattrigen)
Note: Corners: 7:4

2 May 1981 Round 21	Basel	1–2	Xamax	St. Jakob Stadium, Basel
20:00	Marti 15' (1:0)	FCB summary	64' (1:1) Pellegrini; 78' (1:2) Pellegrini	Attendance: 6,500; Referee: (Switzerland) Othmar Winter, (Martigny)

12 May 1981 Round 22	Servette	2–1	Basel	Charmilles Stadium, Geneva
20:00	Radi 53' (1:1); Cucinotta 89' (2:1)	FCB summary	29' (0:1) Lauscher	Attendance: 4,500; Referee: (Switzerland) Rudolf Affolter
Note: Corners 12:1

16 May 1981 Round 23	Basel	4–4	Luzern	St. Jakob Stadium, Basel
20:00	Maissen 63' (1:3); Lauscher 66' (2:4); Maissen 77' (3:4); Küttel 80' (4:4)	FCB summary	23' (0:1) P. Risi; 52' (0:2) Meyer; 56' (0:3) Binder; 64' (1:4) P. Risi	Attendance: 4,500; Referee: (Switzerland) Walter Nussbaumer (Crans-près-Céligny)

23 May 1981 Round 24	Bellinzona	1–1	Basel	Stadio Comunale Bellinzona, Bellinzona
20:00	Leoni 49' (1:0)	FCB summary	75' (o.g. 1:1) (Degiovannini)	Attendance: 4,000; Referee: (Switzerland) André Daina (Éclépens)

4 June 1981 Round 25	Lausanne-Sport	2–2	Basel	Olympique de la Pontaise, Lausanne
20:15	Tachet 65' (pen. 1:1); Kok 80' (2:2)	FCB summary	40' (0:1) Mullis; 75' (1:2) Lauscher	Attendance: 3,700; Referee: (Switzerland) Marco Raveglia (San Vittore)

13 June 1981 Round 26	Basel	1–1	Nordstern Basel	St. Jakob Stadium, Basel
20:15	Gaisser 52' (1:0)	FCB summary	57' (1:1) Zeender	Attendance: 1,000; Referee: (Switzerland) Peter Scherz (Aegerten)

==== Final league table ====
Pos	Team	Pld	W	D	L	GF	GA	GD	Pts	Qualification
1	Zürich	26	18	4	4	57	28	+29	40	Champions, qualified for 1981–82 European Cup and entered 1981 Intertoto Cup
2	Grasshopper Club	26	11	12	3	45	24	+21	34	qualified for 1981–82 UEFA Cup and entered 1981 Intertoto Cup
3	Xamax	26	14	6	6	44	25	+19	34	qualified for 1981–82 UEFA Cup
4	Young Boys	26	11	11	4	46	33	+13	33	entered 1981 Intertoto Cup
5	Lausanne-Sport	26	12	6	8	40	29	+11	30	Swiss Cup winners, qualified for 1981–82 Cup Winners' Cup
6	Basel	26	9	10	7	48	44	+4	28	
7	Servette	26	8	10	8	38	36	+2	26	
8	Sion	26	8	8	10	35	42	−7	24	
9	Luzern	26	6	10	10	39	46	−7	22	entered 1981 Intertoto Cup
10	St. Gallen	26	7	8	11	35	42	−7	22	
11	Nordstern Basel	26	6	7	13	28	37	−9	19	
12	Bellinzona	26	7	5	14	25	46	−21	19	
13	Chiasso	26	5	8	13	28	46	−18	18	
14	Chênois	26	3	9	14	23	53	−30	15	Relegated to 1981–82 Nationalliga B

Source: rsssf.com
Rules for classification: 1) points; 2) goal difference; 3) number of goals scored.

=== Swiss Cup ===
28 September 1980 Round of 32	Fribourg	0–3	Basel	Stade Universitaire, Fribourg
20:00		FCB summary	36' (0:1) Lauscher; 47' (0:2) Maissen; 87' (0:3) Mullis	Attendance: 2,300; Referee: (Switzerland) Othmar Winter, (Martigny)

9 November 1980 Round of 16	Basel	6–0	Martigny-Sports	St. Jakob Stadium, Basel
14:30	Küttel 1' (1:0); Maissen 22' (2:0); Maissen 38' (3:0); Küttel 48' (4:0); Stohler (penalty missed) 66′ Tanner 67' (5:0); Gaisser 84' (6:0)	FCB summary		Attendance: 1,900; Referee: (Switzerland) Roland Chapuis, (Courtételle)
Note: 66th minute Stohler penalty kick hits the crossbar.

29 March 1981 Quarter-final	Zürich	3–0	Basel	Letzigrund, Zürich
15:00	Elsener (yellow card) 15'; Seiler 24' (1:0); Elsener 42' (2:0); Seiler 70' (3:0); Baur (yellow card) 88'	FCZ summary FCB summary		Attendance: 14,000; Referee: (Switzerland) Peter Scherz (Aegerten)
Note: The match was originally scheduled for 29 November 1980, but had to be postponed due to snow. Corners: 11:1

=== Swiss League Cup ===
16 August 1980 First round	Basel	1–2	Zürich	Stadion Schützenmatte, Basel
17:00	Lauscher 86' (1:2)	FCB summary FCZ summary	15' (0:1) Lüdi; (yellow card) 18' Moser; 56' (0:2) Zwicker	Attendance: 2,500; Referee: (Switzerland) Jakob Baumann (Schaffhausen)
Note: Rain before and during the match. Heavy, dull pitch. Corners 8:4

=== European Cup ===
Round 1

17 September 1980 First leg	Club Brugge (Belgium)	0–1	(Switzerland) Basel	Jan Breydel Stadium, Bruges
20:00		UEFA summary FCB summary	(yellow card) 55' Schleiffer; 65' (0:1) Maissen	Referee: (Austria) Adolf Mathias

1 October 1980 Second leg	Basel (Switzerland)	4–1	(Belgium) Club Brugge	St. Jakob Stadium, Basel
20:00	Marti (yellow card) 3'; Tanner 14' (1:1); Stohler 48' (pen. 2:1) von Wartburg 55' (3:1); Geisser 81' (4:1)	UEFA summary FCB summary	4' (0:1) Ceulemans; (yellow card) 12' Meeuws; (red card) 17' Barth (Goalkeeper); (yellow card) 44' Leekens	Referee: (Spain) Ángel Franco Martínez

Basel won 5–1 on aggregate.

Round 2

22 October 1980 First leg	Basel (Switzerland)	1–0	(Socialist Federal Republic of Yugoslavia) Red Star Belgrade	St. Jakob Stadium, Basel
20:00	Lauscher 33' (1:0); Tanner (yellow card) 35'	UEFA summary FCB Summary	(yellow card) 22' Jurišić; (yellow card) 50' Janković	Referee: (Portugal) António Garrido

5 November 1980 Second leg	Red Star Belgrade (Socialist Federal Republic of Yugoslavia)	2–0	(Switzerland) Basel	Red Star Stadium, Belgrade
17:00	Repčić 6' (1:0); Janjanin 18' (2:0); Rajković (yellow card) 68'; Blagojević (yellow card) 87'	UEFA summary FCB summary		Referee: (England) John Carpenter

Red Star Belgrade won 2–1 on aggregate.

== See also ==
- History of FC Basel
- List of FC Basel players
- List of FC Basel seasons

== Sources ==
- Rotblau: Jahrbuch Saison 2015/2016. Publisher: FC Basel Marketing AG. ISBN 978-3-7245-2050-4
- Die ersten 125 Jahre. Publisher: Josef Zindel im Friedrich Reinhardt Verlag, Basel. ISBN 978-3-7245-2305-5
- The FCB squad 1980–81 at fcb-archiv.ch
- Switzerland 1980–81 at RSSSF
- Swiss League Cup at RSSSF
