= 1979–80 FC Basel season =

FC Basel
1979–80 season
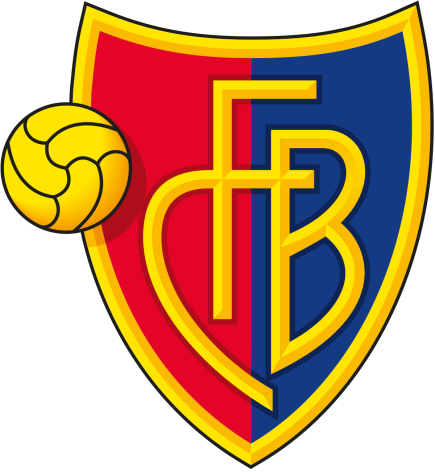
- Chairman: René Theler
- Manager: Helmut Benthaus
- Ground: St. Jakob Stadium, Basel
- Nationalliga A: Qualifying phase: 2nd of 14
- Championship: Champions
- Swiss Cup: Round 5
- Swiss League Cup: Round 1
- Top goalscorer: League: Detlev Lauscher, Joseph Küttel and Erni Maissen (18 each); All: Joseph Küttel (19)
- Highest home attendance: 27,000 on 27 June 1980 vs Servette
- Lowest home attendance: 4,000 on 11 August 1979 vs Sion and on 22 March 1980 vs Chiasso

The Fussball Club Basel 1893 1979–80 season was their 86th season since the club was founded. It was their 34th consecutive season in the top flight of Swiss football after they won promotion during the season 1945–46. They played their home games in the St. Jakob Stadium. René Theler was the club's chairman for the fourth consecutive season.

== Overview ==
Match program Basel-Servette 25 August 1979

=== Pre-season ===
Helmut Benthaus was first team manager for the fifteenth consecutive season. There were a number of players that left the squad during the off-season. Midfield player Urs Siegenthaler moved on to Schaffhausen after eight years and 112 league games with the club. Stricker Roland Schönenberger moved on to Young Boys after four seasons, he had played 110 league games and scored 41 league goals. Defender Paul Fischli ended his professional career. After ten years with the club he moved on to local amateur team FC Münchenstein as player-coach. Between the years 1968 and 1979 Fischli played a total of 395 games for Basel scoring a total of 22 goals. 189 of these games were in the Nationalliga A, 52 in the Swiss Cup and Swiss League Cup, 59 in the European competitions (European Cup, Cup Winners' Cup, UEFA cup and Cup of the Alps) and 95 were friendly games. He scored seven goals in the domestic league, two in the cup competitions, two in the European competitions and the other 11 were scored during the test games.

In the other direction the experienced René Hasler and youngster Ernst Schleiffer both signed in from Xamax. Joseph Küttel signed in from Young Boys. Two local players joined both from the other side of the border. French player Serge Gaisser joined in from St. Louis and German Manfred Jungk joined from SV Weil.

Basel played a total of 57 games in their 1979–80 season. 36 matches were played in the domestic league, two in the Swiss Cup, one in the Swiss League Cup and 18 were friendly matches. The team scored a total of 160 goals and conceded 62. All of their friendly games were played away from home. Of their 18 test games, 14 were won, two were drawn and two ended with a defeat. One of the defeats was against the Swiss national team.

=== Domestic league ===
14 teams played in the 1979–80 Nationalliga A. The qualification round was played as double round-robin. The top six teams were qualified for the championship group. There was no relegation round to be held this season and the bottom two teams were to be relegated after the qualification. Following the poor season the year before Basel started the season as outsiders. Reigning Champions Servette together with the two clubs Grasshopper Club Zürich and FC Zürich were favorites. Benthaus declared qualification to the UEFA Cup as the team's primary aim. Basel ended the qualification round in second position, two points behind Servette and one ahead of the Grasshoppers. In the championship group the points obtained in the qualification were halved as a bonus (rounded up). Basel won the Championship with 33 points, two ahead of both second place Grasshopper Club and third placed Servette. Basel scored a total of 91 goals conceding 38 in the 32 league games. This was the club's eighth championship title in their history and the seventh and last under trainer Benthaus.

Erni Maissen and Detlev Lauscher led the team's top goal scorers list after the qualifying phase, both with 13 league goals. At the end of the season they were joined by Joseph Küttel and all three managed to score 18 league goals during the season. Maissen had played in 35 league matches, Lauscher had played in 33 and Küttel had had 32 appearances. Goalkeeper Hans Küng and the two defenders Jean-Pierre Maradan and Jörg Stohler played in all 36 domestic league games. In the qualification round 22, the home match at the Landhof on 26 April Küttel scored four goals as Basel won 6–1 against Xamax. In the home match against Luzern on 17 May Lauscher went one better and scored five goals as Basel won 8–2.

=== Swiss Cup and League Cup ===
All NLA teams entered the Swiss Cup in the round of 32. Basel were drawn away against Mendrisiostar where they won 3–1. In the second round, again away from home in the Wankdorf Stadium and this against Young Boys. In the Swiss League Cup Basel were also drawn away from home against the Young Boys. Basel lost both duels and thus without further cup matches to contest they had enough strength and energy to win the Swiss championship.

== Players ==
Note: Flags indicate national team as defined under FIFA eligibility rules; some limited exceptions apply. Players may hold more than one non-FIFA nationality.

| No. | Pos. | Nation | Player |
|---|---|---|---|
| 1 | GK | SUI | Hans Küng (league games: 36) |
| 2 | DF | SUI | Walter Geisser (league games/goals: 34/2) |
| 3 | MF | SUI | Robert Baldinger (league games: 1) |
| 4 | MF | SUI | Ernst Schleiffer (from Xamax, league games: 21) |
| 5 | DF | SUI | René Hasler (from Xamax, league games: 34/1) |
| 6 | MF | SUI | Otto Demarmels (league games/goals: 29/7) |
| 7 | FW | SUI | Peter Marti (league games/goals: 25/7) |
| 8 | MF | SUI | Markus Tanner (league games/goals: 16/4) |
| 9 | MF | SUI | Joseph Küttel (from Young Boys, league games/goals: 32/18) |
| 10 | MF | SUI | Arthur von Wartburg (league games/goals: 34/4) |
| 11 | MF | GER | Detlev Lauscher (league games/goals: 33/18) |

| No. | Pos. | Nation | Player |
|---|---|---|---|
| 12 | DF | SUI | Jean-Pierre Maradan (league games/goals: 36/2) |
| 13 | DF | SUI | Rolf Schönauer |
| 14 | DF | SUI | Jörg Stohler (league games/goals: 36/2) |
| 15 | MF | SUI | Erwin Meyer (league games: 2) |
| 16 | MF | SUI | Hansruedi Schär (league games: 18) |
| 17 | DF | FRA | Serge Gaisser (from St. Louis, league games/goals: 23/3) |
| 18 | MF | SUI | Erni Maissen (league games/goals: 35/18) |
| 22 | GK | SUI | Hans Müller |
| — | DF | GER | Manfred Jungk (from SV Weil, league games: 3) |
| — | DF | SUI | René Zingg (league games: 1) |

Players who left the squad

Note: Flags indicate national team as defined under FIFA eligibility rules; some limited exceptions apply. Players may hold more than one non-FIFA nationality.

| No. | Pos. | Nation | Player |
|---|---|---|---|
| — | DF | SUI | Urs Siegenthaler (to Schaffhausen) |
| — | DF | SUI | Paul Fischli (to FC Münchenstein) |
| — | FW | SUI | Roland Schönenberger (to Young Boys) |

| No. | Pos. | Nation | Player |
|---|---|---|---|
| — | MF | SUI | Silvan Corbat (reserves) |
| — | | SUI | Daniel Hagenbuch (reserves) |
| — | GK | SUI | Felix Wälchli (reserves) |

== Results ==
Legend

Win Draw Loss Postponed

=== Friendly matches ===
==== Pre- and mid-season ====
| 20 July 1979 Pre-season | DJK Konstanz (Germany) | 0–2 | (Switzerland) Basel | Konstanz |
| | | FCB summary | 15' (0:1) Küttel; 60' (0:2) Küttel |

| 22 July 1979 Pre-season | FC Uster (Switzerland) | 0–12 | (Switzerland) Basel | Uster |
| | | FCB summary | (4x) Lauscher (3x) Küttel (2x) Tanner (1x) von Wartburg (1x) Stohler (1x) Maissen | Attendance: 1,300; Referee: (Switzerland) Charles-Henri Morex (Bex) |
Note: Uster was strengthened by the players Köbi Kuhn and Rosario Martinelli.

| 24 July 1979 Pre-season | VfL Bochum (Switzerland) | 1–1 | (Switzerland) Basel | Oberfeldstadion, Schopfheim |
| 18:30 | Lameck 62' (1:0) | FCB summary | 83' (1:1) Gaisser | Attendance: 3,000; Referee: (Germany) Bruno Sahner |

| 26 July 1979 Pre-season | Laufental XI (Switzerland) | 4–5 | (Switzerland) Basel | Zwingen |
| 15:15 | Bieli (1:2); Hänggi (2:3); Bieli (3:3); Ulli (4:4) | FCB summary | 12' (0:1) Küttel (0:2) Baldinger (1:3) Lauscher (3:4) Lauscher (o.g. 4:5) | Attendance: 500 |

| 29 July 1979 Pre-season | Niederzier XI (Germany) | 0–7 | (Switzerland) Basel | Niederzier |
| | | FCB summary | 8' (0:1) Tanner; 25' (0:2) Küttel; 29' (0:3) Maissen; 42' (0:4) Lauscher; 73' (0:5) Meyer; 81' (0:6) Hasler; 83' (0:7) Jungk |

| 31 July 1979 Pre-season | Young Boys (Switzerland) | 3–4 | (Switzerland) Basel | Wankdorf Stadium, Bern |
| 18:30 | Zwygart 55' (pen. 1:3); Zwygart 59' (2:3); Tanner 81' (o.g. 3:4) | FCB summary | 15' (0:1) Demarmels; 28' (0:2) von Wartburg; 36' (0:3) Stohler; 77' (2:4) von Wartburg | Attendance: 6,000; Referee: (Switzerland) Peter Scherz (Aegerten) |

| 2 August 1979 Uhrencup semi-final | La Chaux-de-Fonds (Switzerland) | 1–2 | (Switzerland) Basel | Stadion Brühl, Grenchen |
| 20:00 | Mauron 20' (1:0) | FCB summary | (yellow card) 40' Lauscher; 60' (1:1) Meyer; 90' (1:2) von Wartburg | Attendance: 1,200; Referee: (Switzerland) Peter Rotschi (Oensingen) |

| 3 August 1979 Uhrencup final | Grenchen (Switzerland) | 1–4 | (Switzerland) Basel | Stadion Brühl, Grenchen |
| | Zoppelletto 51' (1:1) | FCB summary | 35' (0:1) Maissen; 80' (1:2) Gaisser; 81' (1:3) Meyer; 85' (1:4) Meyer | Attendance: 2,200; Referee: (Switzerland) Werner Bösch (Sutz-Lattrigen) |

| 10 October 1979 Mid-season | SV Weil (Germany) | 0–5 | (Switzerland) Basel | Nonnenholz, Weil am Rhein |
| 18:30 | | FCB summary | 13' (0:1) Schleiffer; 34' (0:2) Geisser; 35' (0:3) Demarmels; 50' (0:4) Schleiffer; 65' (0:5) Gaisser | Attendance: 800; Referee: (Germany) Penninger |

| 17 October 1979 Mid-season | Saint-Louis (France) | 1–6 | (Switzerland) Basel | Saint-Louis |
| 19:30 | (1x) | FCB summary | (2x) Maissen (1x) Marti (1x) Tanner (1x) Lauscher (1x) Gaisser |

| 30 October 1979 Mid-season | Switzerland | 3–0 | (Switzerland) Basel | Sportplatz Sternenfeld, Birsfelden |
| 19:00 | Pfister 3' (pen. 1:0); Tanner 57' (2:0); Zappa 91' (3:0) | FCB summary | | Attendance: 2,800; Referee: (Switzerland) Hans Wolfer |

==== Winter break ====
| 23 January 1980 Winter break | Sion (Switzerland) | 0–2 | (Switzerland) Basel | Guadeloupe |
| | | FCB summary | 72' (0:1) Gaisser; 81' (0:2) Tanner | Attendance: 1,000 |
Note: Exhibition game as part of the team's training camp.

| 24 January 1980 Winter break | Guadeloupe XI | 1–1 | (Switzerland) Basel | Guadeloupe |
| | (1:0) | FCB summary | 80' (1:1) Stohler |
Note: Exhibition game as part of the team's training camp.

| 31 January 1980 Winter break | Antigua XI (Antigua and Barbuda) | 1–2 | (Switzerland) Basel | St. John's, Antigua and Barbuda |
| | Goal | FCB summary | 30' Gaisser; 89' Marti | Attendance: 2,500 |
Note: Exhibition game as part of the team's training camp.

| 10 February 1980 Winter break | Xamax (Switzerland) | 2–1 | (Switzerland) Basel | Stade de la Maladière (1924), Neuchâtel |
| 15:00 | Rub 36' (1:0); Bianchi 41' (2:0) | FCB summary | 65' (2:1) Tanner | Attendance: 1,000; Referee: (Switzerland) Denis Perrenoud |

| 16 February 1980 Winter break | Baden (Switzerland) | 2–7 | (Switzerland) Basel | Scharten, Baden |
| 15:00 | Golacino 52' (1:2); Golacino 76' (2:6) | FCB summary | 42' (0:1) Maradan; 44' (0:2) Stohler; 56' (1:3) Maradan; 68' (1:4) Tanner; 72' (1:5) von Wartburg; 84' (1:6) Schär; 87' (2:7) Gaisser | Attendance: 250 |

| 23 February 1980 Winter break | FC Bern (Switzerland) | 0–5 | (Switzerland) Basel | Stadion Neufeld, Bern |
| 14:30 | | FCB summary | 10' (0:1) Lauscher; 41' (pen. 0:2) Stohler; 53' (0:3) Stohler; 70' (0:4) Meyer; 72' (0:5) Tanner | Attendance: 200; Referee: (Switzerland) Peter Rotschi (Oensingen) |

=== Nationalliga A ===
==== Qualifying phase matches ====
| 11 August 1979 Round 1 | Basel | 2–1 | Sion | St. Jakob Stadium, Basel |
| 17:15 | Demarmels 18' (1:0); Küttel 69' (2:0) | FCB summary | (yellow card) 27' Balet; 88' (2:1) Luisier | Attendance: 4,000; Referee: (Switzerland) Jakob Baumann (Schaffhausen) |

| 18 August 1979 Round 2 | La Chaux-de-Fonds | 1–1 | Basel | Stade Charrière, La Chaux-de-Fonds |
| 17:15 | Morandi (yellow card) 44'; Berberat 56' (1:1) | FCB summary | (yellow card) 25' Stohler; (yellow card) 46' Marti; 51' (0:1) Tanner | Attendance: 2,500; Referee: (Switzerland) Bruno Galler (Kirchdorf, Bern) |
Note: Persistent rain, cool. Corners: 6:2

| 25 August 1979 Round 3 | Basel | 0–1 | Servette | St. Jakob Stadium, Basel |
| 20:00 | Maradan (yellow card) 73' | FCB summary | (yellow card) 68' Trinchero; 76' (0:1) Hamberg | Attendance: 10,000; Referee: (Switzerland) Hans Wolfer (Volketswil) |

| 29 August 1979 Round 4 | Luzern | 2–0 | Basel | Stadion Allmend, Luzern |
| 20:15 | Risi 42' (1:0); Risi 65' (pen. 2:0) | FCB summary | (yellow card) 58' Tanner | Attendance: 11,000; Referee: (Switzerland) Franz Gächter (Aarau, Suhr, Aargau) |

| 1 September 1979 Round 5 | Basel | 2–0 | Grasshopper Club | St. Jakob Stadium, Basel |
| 20:00 | Tanner 20' (1:0); Tanner 65' (2:0) | FCB summary | | Attendance: 8,500; Referee: (Switzerland) Rudolf Renggli (Stans and Luzern) |

| 8 September 1979 Round 6 | Chiasso | 1–1 | Basel | Stadio Comunale Riva IV, Chiasso |
| 20:30 | Bang 80' (1:1) | FCB summary | (yellow card) 14' Maissen; 51' (0:1) Maissen | Attendance: 2,300; Referee: (Switzerland) Werner Bösch (Sutz-Lattrigen) |

| 15 September 1979 Round 7 | Basel | 4–1 | Young Boys | St. Jakob Stadium, Basel |
| 20:00 | Lauscher 7' (1:0); Küttel 29' (2:0); Maissen 38' (3:0); Tanner 52' (4:0) | FCB summary | 66' (4:1) Schönenberger | Attendance: 9,000; Referee: (Switzerland) Franz Gächter (Aarau, Suhr, Aargau) |

| 11 September 1979 Round 8 | Lausanne-Sport | 0–3 | Basel | Olympique de la Pontaise, Lausanne |
| 20:15 | | FCB summary | 44' (0:1) Maissen; 58' (0:2) Küttel; 68' (0:3) Lauscher | Attendance: 3,000; Referee: (Switzerland) Denis Perrenoud |

| 7 October 1979 Round 9 | Basel | 0–0 | Chênois | St. Jakob Stadium, Basel |
| 15:00 | | FCB summary | | Attendance: 5,500; Referee: (Switzerland) Rudolf Affolter |

| 20 October 1979 Round 10 | Xamax | 0–1 | Basel | Stade de la Maladière (1924), Neuchâtel |
| 18:15 | Rub (yellow card); Schleiffer (yellow card) | FCB summary | 70' (0:1) Maissen | Attendance: 4,000; Referee: (Switzerland) Renzo Peduzzi (Roveredo) |

| 28 October 1979 Round 11 | Basel | 1–1 | St. Gallen | St. Jakob Stadium, Basel |
| 15:00 | Küttel 36' (1:0); Lauscher (yellow card) 64'; Maradan (yellow card) 76'; Tanner (yellow card) 88' | FCB summary | (yellow card) 43' Scheiwiler; 53' (1:1) Stomeo | Attendance: 8,500; Referee: (Switzerland) Alfred Heinis (Ammannsegg, Biberist) |

| 11 November 1979 Round 12 | Zürich | 1–1 | Basel | Letzigrund, Zürich |
| 14:30 | Kundert (yellow card) 21'; Seiler 71' (1:1) | FCZ summary FCB summary | 29' (0:1) Lauscher; (yellow card) 61' Demarmels | Attendance: 14,500; Referee: (Switzerland) André Daina (Éclépens) |

| 25 November 1979 Round 13 | Basel | 7–0 | Lugano | St. Jakob Stadium, Basel |
| 14:30 | Maradan 5' (1:0); Demarmels 28' (2:0) von Wartburg 30' (3:0); Maradan 46' (4:0); Lauscher 59' (5:0); Gaisser 61' (6:0); Maissen 71' (7:0) | FCB summary | (yellow card) 52' Castelli | Attendance: 5,500; Referee: (Switzerland) Franz Gächter (Aarau, Suhr, Aargau) |
Note: Corners 7:8

| 2 December 1979 Round 14 | Sion | 1–2 | Basel | Stade Tourbillon, Sion |
| 14:30 | Cernicky 38' (1:0) | FCB summary | 47' (1:1) Maissen; 57' (1:2) Lauscher | Attendance: 8,000; Referee: (Switzerland) Walter Nussbaumer (Crans-près-Céligny) |

| 2 March 1980 Round 15 | Basel | 6–0 | La Chaux-de-Fonds | St. Jakob Stadium, Basel |
| 15:00 | Lauscher 13' (1:0); Maissen 43' (2:0); Stohler 45' (pen. 3:0); Stohler 61' (4:0); Demarmels 71' (5:0); Maissen 90' (6:0) | FCB summary | | Attendance: 5,000; Referee: (Switzerland) Rudolf Renggli (Stans and Luzern) |

| 9 March 1980 Round 16 | Servette | 0–0 | Basel | Charmilles Stadium, Geneva |
| 14:45 | | FCB summary | | Attendance: 8,500; Referee: (Switzerland) Bruno Galler (Kirchdorf, Bern) |

| 16 March 1980 Round 17 | Grasshopper Club | 4–1 | Basel | Hardturm, Zürich |
| 14:30 | Herbert Hermann 9' (1:0); Nafzger 12' (2:0); Maradan 41' (o.g. 3:0); Herbert Hermann 46' (4:0) | FCB summary | 66' (4:1) Demarmels | Attendance: 12,000; Referee: (Switzerland) Alfred Heinis (Ammannsegg, Biberist) |

| 22 March 1980 Round 18 | Basel | 6–1 | Chiasso | St. Jakob Stadium, Basel |
| 20:00 | Maissen 5' (1:0); Gaisser 45' (2:1); Maissen 65' (3:1) von Wartburg 66' (4:1) (Marco CasartelliCasartelli) 71' (o.g. 5:1); Demarmels 80' (6:1) | FCB summary | 41' (1:1) Pellegrini | Attendance: 4,000; Referee: (Switzerland) Jean-Marie Macheret |

| 29 March 1980 Round 19 | Young Boys | 1–3 | Basel | Wankdorf Stadium, Bern |
| 17:30 | Brechbühl 56' (1:1) | FCB summary | 43' (0:1) Küttel; 86' (1:2) Küttel; 90+1' (1:3) Marti | Attendance: 7,800; Referee: (Switzerland) Franz Gächter (Aarau, Suhr, Aargau) |

| 12 April 1980 Round 20 | Basel | 3–1 | Lausanne-Sport | St. Jakob Stadium, Basel |
| 20:00 | Küttel 35' (1:0); Geisser 40' (2:0); Marti 86' (3:1) | FCB summary | 69' (2:1) Parietti | Attendance: 8,500; Referee: (Switzerland) Walter Nussbaumer (Crans-près-Céligny) |

| 19 April 1980 Round 21 | Chênois | 1–1 | Basel | Stade des Trois-Chêne, Thônex |
| 20:15 | Tachet 60' (1:0) | FCB summary | (yellow card) 60' Lauscher; (yellow card) 62' Maissen; 87' (1:1) von Wartburg | Attendance: 3,000; Referee: (Switzerland) André Daina (Éclépens) |
Note: Light rain before and partly during the game.

| 26 April 1980 Round 22 | Basel | 6–1 | Xamax | St. Jakob Stadium, Basel |
| 20:00 | von Wartburg 18' (1:0); Küttel 30' (2:0); Küttel 40' (3:0); Küttel 69' (4:1); Küttel 79' (5:1); Maissen 90' (6:1) | FCB summary | 61' (3:1) Bianchi | Attendance: 5,000; Referee: (Switzerland) Hans Wolfer (Volketswil) |

| 3 May 1980 Round 23 | St. Gallen | 3–0 | Basel | Espenmoos, St. Gallen |
| 17:30 | Roger CorminboeufCorminboeuf 51' (1:0); Friberg 60' (2:0); Friberg 63' (3:0) | FCB summary | | Attendance: 10,500; Referee: (Switzerland) Franz Gächter (Aarau, Suhr, Aargau) |

| 10 May 1980 Round 24 | Basel | 3–1 | Zürich | St. Jakob Stadium, Basel |
| 20:00 | Lauscher 23' (1:0); Marti 56' (2:0); Lauscher 58' (3:0); Maissen (yellow card) 89' | FCZ summary Summary | (yellow card) 58' Lüdi; 61' (3:1) Elsener | Attendance: 19,000; Referee: (Switzerland) André Daina (Éclépens) |

| 17 May 1980 Round 25 | Basel | 8–2 | Luzern | St. Jakob Stadium, Basel |
| 20:00 | Lauscher 17' (1:1); Lauscher 48' (2:2); Demarmels 55' (3:2); Marti 69' (4:2); Lauscher 75' (5:2); Küttel 76' (6:2); Lauscher 79' (7:2); Lauscher 90' (8:2); Marti (yellow card) | FCB summary | 5' (0:1) Risi; 31' (1:2) Kaufmann; (yellow card) Rahmen; (yellow card) Binder | Attendance: 21,000; Referee: (Switzerland) Peter Scherz (Aegerten) |

| 20 May 1980 Round 26 | Lugano | 2–5 | Basel | Cornaredo, Lugano |
| 20:00 | Hitzfeld 30' (pen. 1:3); Arigoni (yellow card) 49'; Elia (yellow card) 80'; Hitzfeld 85' (2:5) | FCB summary | 5' (0:1) Demarmels; 12' (0:2) Maissen; 22' (0:3) Maissen; 48' (1:4) Hasler; 83' (1:5) Demarmels | Attendance: 2,000; Referee: (Switzerland) Marino Paggiola (Appenzell) |
Note: Corners 3:15.

==== Qualifying phase table ====
| Pos | Team | Pld | W | D | L | GF | GA | GD | Pts | Qualification |
|---|---|---|---|---|---|---|---|---|---|---|
| 1 | Servette | 26 | 16 | 7 | 3 | 61 | 25 | +36 | 39 | Advance to championship round halved points (rounded up) as bonus |
| 2 | Basel | 26 | 15 | 7 | 4 | 67 | 27 | +40 | 37 | Advance to championship round halved points (rounded up) as bonus |
| 3 | Grasshopper Club | 26 | 14 | 8 | 4 | 61 | 21 | +40 | 36 | Advance to championship round halved points (rounded up) as bonus |
| 4 | Luzern | 26 | 14 | 4 | 8 | 44 | 44 | 0 | 32 | Advance to championship round halved points (rounded up) as bonus |
| 5 | Zürich | 26 | 13 | 5 | 8 | 56 | 42 | +14 | 31 | Advance to championship round halved points (rounded up) as bonus |
| 6 | Sion | 26 | 11 | 9 | 6 | 47 | 37 | +10 | 31 | Advance to championship round halved points (rounded up) as bonus |
| 7 | St. Gallen | 26 | 11 | 6 | 9 | 48 | 37 | +11 | 28 | entered 1980 Intertoto Cup |
| 8 | Chiasso | 26 | 6 | 11 | 9 | 27 | 43 | −16 | 23 | |
| 9 | Lausanne-Sport | 26 | 8 | 6 | 12 | 35 | 38 | −3 | 22 | |
| 10 | Young Boys | 26 | 8 | 5 | 13 | 34 | 49 | −15 | 21 | entered 1980 Intertoto Cup |
| 11 | Chênois | 26 | 4 | 12 | 10 | 32 | 45 | −13 | 20 | |
| 12 | Xamax | 26 | 8 | 4 | 14 | 33 | 48 | −15 | 20 | entered 1980 Intertoto Cup |
| 13 | La Chaux-de-Fonds | 26 | 5 | 7 | 14 | 24 | 57 | −33 | 17 | Relegated to 1980–81 Nationalliga B |
| 14 | Lugano | 26 | 1 | 5 | 20 | 18 | 74 | −56 | 7 | Relegated to 1980–81 Nationalliga B |

Source: rsssf.com
Rules for classification: 1) Points; 2) Goal difference; 3) Goals scored;

==== Championship group ====
| 31 May 1980 Round 1 | Basel | 0–0 | Grasshopper Club | St. Jakob Stadium, Basel |
| 20:00 | | FCB summary | | Attendance: 23,500; Referee: (Switzerland) Bruno Galler (Kirchdorf, Bern) |

| 4 June 1980 Round 2 | Sion | 2–2 | Basel | Stade Tourbillon, Sion |
| 20:15 | (Küttel) 41' (o.g. 1:2); Balet 48' (2:2); Luisier (yellow card) 88' | FCB summary | 6' (0:1) Marti; 14' (0:2) Marti; (yellow card) 18' Maissen | Attendance: 8,000; Referee: (Switzerland) Walter Nussbaumer (Crans-près-Céligny) |

| 7 June 1980 Round 3 | Basel | 5–0 | Luzern | St. Jakob Stadium, Basel |
| 20:00 | Geisser 12' (1:0); Maissen 38' (2:0); Demarmels 71' (3:0); Gaisser 80' (4:0); Küttel 90' (5:0) | FCB summary | (yellow card) Kaufmann | Attendance: 13,000; Referee: (Switzerland) Freddy Philippoz (Sion) |

| 10 June 1980 Round 4 | Servette | 2–1 | Basel | Charmilles Stadium, Geneva |
| 20:00 | Valentini 62' (1:0); Cucinotta 74' (2:0) | FCB summary | (yellow card) 60' Maradan; 63' (1:1) Lauscher | Attendance: 12,500; Referee: (Switzerland) Jean-Marie Macheret, (Rueyres-St-Laurent) |

| 13 June 1980 Round 5 | Basel | 2–0 | Zürich | St. Jakob Stadium, Basel |
| 20:00 | Küttel 55' (1:0); Küttel 74' (2:0) | FCZ summary FCB summary | | Attendance: 10,000; Referee: (Switzerland) Gottlieb Barmettler (Luzern) |

| 16 June 1980 Round 6 | Grasshopper Club | 3–1 | Basel | Hardturm, Zürich |
| 20:00 | Ponte 26' (1:0); Pfister 43' (2:0); René NafzgerNafzger (yellow card) 74'; Bigi Meier 85' (pen. 3:1) | FCB summary | 47' (2:1) Küttel; (yellow card) 52' Küttel | Attendance: 8,500; Referee: (Switzerland) Jakob Baumann (Schaffhausen) |

| 20 June 1980 Round 7 | Basel | 3–2 | Sion | St. Jakob Stadium, Basel |
| 20:00 | Lauscher 12' (1:0); Lauscher 60' (2:1); Maissen 75' (3:1) | FCB summary | 36' (1:1) Cernicky; 82' (3:2) Cernicky | Attendance: 7,000; Referee: (Switzerland) Werner Bösch |

| 23 June 1980 Round 8 | Luzern | 0–4 | Basel | Stadion Allmend Luzern |
| | | FCB summary | 2' (0:1) Maissen; 19' (0:2) Küttel; 55' (0:3) Maissen; 75' (0:4) Küttel | Attendance: 6,000; Referee: (Switzerland) Charles-Henri Morex (Bex) |

| 27 June 1980 Round 9 | Basel | 2–0 | Servette | St. Jakob Stadium, Basel |
| 20:00 | Lauscher 44' (1:0) (Trinchero) 66' (o.g. 2:0) | FCB summary | (yellow card) 55' Barberis | Attendance: 27,500; Referee: (Switzerland) Rudolf Renggli Luzern |

| 30 June 1980 Round 10 | Zürich | 2–4 | Basel | Letzigrund, Zürich |
| 20:00 | Jerković 9' (1:1); Landolt (yellow card) 41'; Zappa 77' (2:4) | FCZ summary FCB summary | 4' (0:1) Maissen; 21' (1:2) Lauscher; 31' (1:3) Marti; 35' (o.g. 1:4) (Erba); (yellow card) 72' Maissen | Attendance: 24,000; Referee: (Switzerland) Bruno Galler (Kirchdorf, Bern) |
Note: With this victory Basel became Swiss champions 1979/80. After the game, the trophy was presented by Nationalliga president Rumo.

==== Championship table ====
| Pos | Team | Pld | W | D | L | GF | GA | GD | BP | Pts | Qualification |
|---|---|---|---|---|---|---|---|---|---|---|---|
| 1 | Basel | 10 | 6 | 2 | 2 | 24 | 11 | +13 | 19 | 33 | Champions, qualified for 1980–81 European Cup |
| 2 | Grasshopper Club | 10 | 5 | 3 | 2 | 21 | 11 | +10 | 18 | 31 | qualified for 1980–81 UEFA Cup |
| 3 | Servette | 10 | 5 | 1 | 4 | 18 | 11 | +7 | 20 | 31 | qualified for 1980–81 UEFA Cup |
| 4 | Zürich | 10 | 5 | 1 | 4 | 17 | 15 | +2 | 16 | 27 | |
| 5 | Sion | 10 | 4 | 2 | 4 | 22 | 20 | +2 | 16 | 26 | Swiss Cup winners, qualified for 1980–81 Cup Winners' Cup and entered 1980 Intertoto Cup |
| 6 | Luzern | 10 | 0 | 1 | 9 | 4 | 38 | −34 | 16 | 17 | |

Source: rsssf.com
Rules for classification: 1) Points; 2) Goal difference; 3) Goals scored;

=== Swiss Cup ===
| 30 September 1979 Round 4 | Mendrisiostar | 1–3 | Basel | Centro Sportivo Comunale, Mendrisio |
| 15:00 | Roncari (yellow card) 30'; Preisig 59' (1:1) | FCB summary | 16' (0:1) Tanner; (yellow card) 41' Maradan; 65' (1:2) Küttel; 81' (1:3) Demarmels | Attendance: 1,500; Referee: (Switzerland) Franz Gächter (Aarau, Suhr, Aargau) |
Note: Mendrisiostar played the 1979–80 season in the 1. Liga (third-tier).

| 4 November 1979 Round 5 | Young Boys | 2–0 | Basel | Wankdorf Stadium, Bern |
| 14:30 | Müller 29' (1:0); Zwahlen (yellow card) 47'; Schönenberger (yellow card) 52'; Zwahlen 62' (2:0) | FCB summary | | Attendance: 9,000; Referee: (Switzerland) Peter Rotschi (Oensingen) |

=== Swiss League Cup ===
| 4 August 1979 Round 1 | Young Boys | 1–0 | Basel | Wankdorf Stadium, Bern |
| | Hussner 44' (1:0) | FCB summary | | Attendance: 3,400; Referee: (Switzerland) René Maire (Chêne-Bougeries, Genève) |

== See also ==
- History of FC Basel
- List of FC Basel players
- List of FC Basel seasons

== Sources ==
- Rotblau: Jahrbuch Saison 2015/2016. Publisher: FC Basel Marketing AG. ISBN 978-3-7245-2050-4
- Die ersten 125 Jahre. Publisher: Josef Zindel im Friedrich Reinhardt Verlag, Basel. ISBN 978-3-7245-2305-5
- The FCB squad 1979–80 at fcb-archiv.ch
- Switzerland 1979–80 at RSSSF
- Swiss League Cup at RSSSF
