= 1976–77 FC Basel season =

FC Basel
1976–77 season
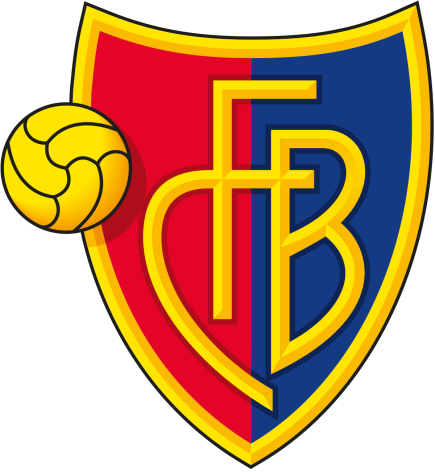
- Chairman: René Theler
- Manager: Helmut Benthaus
- Ground: St. Jakob Stadium, Basel
- Nationalliga A: Champions
- Swiss Cup: Round 5
- Swiss League Cup: Round 2
- UEFA Cup: Round 2
- Cup of the Alps: Group stage
- Top goalscorer: League: Erni Maissen (10); All: Erni Maissen (12)
- Highest home attendance: 25,500 on 1 September 1976 vs Young Boys
- Lowest home attendance: 4,000 on 2 April 1977 vs Bellinzona
- Average home league attendance: 9,954

The Fussball Club Basel 1893 1976–77 season was their 83rd season since the club was founded. It was their 31st consecutive season in the top flight of Swiss football after they won promotion during the season 1945–46. They played their home games in the St. Jakob Stadium. René Theler was voted as new chairman at the AGM and took over from Félix Musfeld, who had been the club chairman over the previous six seasons.

== Overview ==
=== Pre-season ===
Helmut Benthaus was first team manager for the twelfth consecutive season. There were only a few changes in the team squad this season. Detlev Lauscher joined from 1. FC Köln. Lauscher had played five seasons for 1. FC Köln in the German first division, helping the club finish as runners-up in the league and cup during 1973. Jean-Pierre Maradan joined from lower tier Grenchen but quickly became a key player. Again Benthaus relied upon the young players who had come up from the reserve team when needed in the first team.

Basel played a total of 56 games in their 1976–77 season. 33 in the domestic league, two in the Swiss Cup, two in the Swiss League Cup, four in the Cup of the Alps, four in the 1976–77 UEFA Cup and 11 were friendly matches. The team scored a total of 134 goals and conceded 80. Basel won eight of their friendly games, drew two and lost one of them.

=== Domestic league ===
The Swiss Football Association had reformed the Swiss football league system that year reducing the number of teams in the Nationalliga A from 14 to 12 and increasing the Nationalliga B teams from 14 to 16. The Nationalliga A season 1976–77 was contested by the first 11 teams from the previous season and the sole promoted team AC Bellinzona. The champions would qualify for the 1977–78 European Cup and the Swiss Cup winners would qualify for 1977–78 Cup Winners' Cup. The UEFA modified the entry rules for Switzerland, therefore, this season three teams would qualify for the 1977–78 UEFA Cup.

The Nationalliga A was played in two stages. The qualification phase was played by all teams in a double round-robin and, after completion, divided into two groups. The first six teams contended in the championship group (with half of the points obtained in the qualification as bonus) and the positions seventh to twelfth contended the relegation group. Basel finished the qualification phase in second position with 33 points from 22 games and so entered the championship group with a bonus of 17. At the end of the championship phase Servette and Basel were level on 29 points. They therefore had to play a play-off for champions. This play-off was held at the Wankdorf Stadium in Bern in front of 55,000 supporters. Basel won the match 2–1, their goals being scored by Walter Mundschin and Arthur von Wartburg. Basel were awarded the championship title and qualified for the 1977–78 European Cup. Servette, Zürich and Grasshopper Club qualified for the 1977–78 UEFA Cup.

=== Swiss Cup and League Cup ===
In the Swiss Cup Basel won away from home against lower tier Fribourg in the round of 32 and in the round of 16 were drawn away against Xamax but were defeated. In the Swiss League Cup they won away from home against lower tier Grenchen. Then in the round of 16 were drawn away against Luzern and here they were defeated. Young Boys won the competition this season.

=== UEFA Cup ===
In the first round of the 1976–77 UEFA Cup Basel were drawn against Northern Ireland team Glentoran F.C. Basel won 5–3 on aggregate. In the second round they were drawn against Spanish team Athletic Bilbao. After a draw in the first leg, they were defeated 1–3 in the second leg, thus lost 2–4 on aggregate.

== Players ==
Note: Flags indicate national team as defined under FIFA eligibility rules; some limited exceptions apply. Players may hold more than one non-FIFA nationality.

No.	Pos.	Nation	Player
1	GK	SUI	Jürg Wenger (league games: 9)
2	MF	SUI	Walter Geisser (league games: 19)
3	DF	SUI	Walter Mundschin (league games/goals: 30/9)
4	MF	SUI	Peter Ramseier (league games/goals: 30/4)
5	DF	SUI	Paul Fischli (league games: 22)
6	MF	SUI	Otto Demarmels (league games/goals: 29/7)
7	MF	SUI	Peter Marti (league games/goals: 21/6)
8	FW	SUI	Markus Tanner (league games/goals: 30/5)
9	MF	SUI	Serge Muhmenthaler (league games/goals: 13/5)
10	MF	DEN	Eigil Nielsen (league games/goals: 28/5)
11	MF	GER	Detlev Lauscher (new 1. FC Köln, league games/goals: 26/8)

No.	Pos.	Nation	Player
12	MF	SUI	Jean-Pierre Maradan (new Grenchen league games/goals: 30/3)
13	FW	SUI	Roland Schönenberger (league games/goals: 11/3)
14	DF	SUI	Jörg Stohler (league games/goals: 31/6)
15	MF	SUI	Rolf Bucher (reserves)
17	MF	SUI	Arthur von Wartburg (league games/goals: 32/3)
18	MF	SUI	Erni Maissen (league games/goals: 26/10)
22	GK	SUI	Hans Müller (league games: 24)
23	GK	SUI	Thomas Manger (reserves)
—	GK	SUI	Felix Wälchli (reserves)
—	DF	SUI	Alex Wirth (reserves)
—	DF	SUI	Markus Just (reserves, league games: 1)

Players who left the squad

Note: Flags indicate national team as defined under FIFA eligibility rules; some limited exceptions apply. Players may hold more than one non-FIFA nationality.

No.	Pos.	Nation	Player
—		SUI	Daniel Hagenbuch (reserves)

No.	Pos.	Nation	Player
—		SUI	? Wolfsberger (reserves)
—	MF	SUI	Michel Amacker (returned to FC Raron)

== Results ==
Legend

Win Draw Loss Postponed

=== Friendly matches ===
==== Pre-season and mid-season ====
19 August 1976 Pre-season	FC Saint-Louis (France)	0–6	(Switzerland) Basel	Stade de la Frontière
20:00		Summary	21' (0:1) Maissen; 30' (0:2) Mundschin (0:3) von Wartburg (0:4) Stohler; 68' (0:5) Marti; 83' (0:6) Marti	Attendance: 1,000

7 September 1976 Pre-season	Nordstern Basel (Switzerland)	1–5	(Switzerland) Basel	St. Jakob Stadium, Basel
20:00	Wenger 67' (1:2)	Summary	51' (0:1) Muhmenthaler; 59' (0:2) Muhmenthaler; 75' (1:3) Maissen; 77' (1:4) Maissen; 89' (1:5) Tanner	Attendance: 1,200; Referee: (Switzerland) Kurt Fuchs Basel

6 October 1976 Mid-season	SC Derendingen (Switzerland)	0–10	(Switzerland) Basel	Heidenegg Derendingen
		Summary	(3x) Lauscher (3x) Maissen (1x) Mundschin (1x) Maradan (1x) Muhmenthaler (1x) Stohler	Attendance: 1,000; Referee: (Switzerland) Peter Rotschi Oensingen

==== Winter break to end of season ====
14 January 1977 Training camp	Guadeloupe XI	1–2	(Switzerland) Basel	Guadeloupe
	Goal	Summary	(0:1) Marti (0:2) Marti	Attendance: 4,000

19 January 1977 Training camp	Guadeloupe XI	0–2	(Switzerland) Basel	Guadeloupe
		Summary	(0:1) Ramseier (0:2) Tanner	Attendance: 2,500

29 January 1977 Winter break	Basel (Switzerland)	1–0	(Switzerland) Winterthur	Landhof, Basel
15:00	Stohler 62' (1:0)	Summary		Attendance: 600; Referee: (Switzerland) Kurt Fuchs (Basel)

2 February 1977 Winter break	Basel (Switzerland)	4–1	(Switzerland) Grenchen	Lanhof, Basel
15:00	Maissen 24' (1:0); Mundschin 25' (2_0); Maissen 44' (3:0); Marti 47' (4:0)	Summary	66' (4:1) Feuz	Attendance: 400; Referee: (Switzerland) Schnidrig (Röschenz)

19 February 1976 Winter break	Gossau (Switzerland)	0–2	(Switzerland) Basel	Gemeindesportplatz, Gossau
15:00		Summary	27' (0:1) Marti; 45' (0:2) Marti	Attendance: 700; Referee: (Switzerland) Mario Osta (Oberuzwil)

19 March 1977 Mid-season	Biel-Bienne (Switzerland)	4–3	(Switzerland) Basel	Gurzelen Stadion, Biel/Bienne
	Lüthi 41' (1:0); Hurni 52' (2:2); Gobet 77' (3:3); Lüthi 83' (4:3)	Summary	43' (1:1) Lauscher; 47' (1:2) Schönenberger; 53' (2:3) von Wartburg	Attendance: 500; Referee: (Switzerland) Jean Dubach (Nidau)

24 April 1977 Mid-season	Basel (Switzerland)	1–1	(West Germany) 1. FC Kaiserslautern	Landhof, Basel
15:00	Mundschin 75' (1:0)	Summary	85' (1:1) Schwarz	Attendance: 1,000

4 June 1977 Mid-season	Grasshopper Club (Switzerland)	3–3	(Switzerland) Basel	Blumberg, Germany
	Meyer (1x); Bosco (1x); Bänziger (1x)	Summary	(1x) Nielsen (1x) Lauscher (1x) Mundschin	Attendance: 1,000

=== Nationalliga A ===
==== Qualifying phase matches ====
14 August 1976 Round 1	Basel	4–1	Chênois	St. Jakob Stadium, Basel
20:00	Tanner 45' (1:1); Muhmenthaler 60' (2:1); Marti 64' (3:1); Lauscher 90' (4:1)	Summary	5' (0:1) Manai; (yellow card) Dumont	Attendance: 7,000; Referee: (Switzerland) Peter Scherz (Aegerten)

21 August 1976 Round 2	Lausanne-Sport	0–1	Basel	Olympique de la Pontaise, Lausanne
20:30		Summary	43' (0:1) Maissen	Attendance: 7,700; Referee: (Switzerland) Bruno Della Bruna (Lumino)

28 August 1976 Round 3	Basel	6–1	Winterthur	St. Jakob Stadium, Basel
20:00	Mundschin 9' (1:0); Maissen 12' (2:0); Muhmenthaler 21' (3:0); Stohler 23' (pen. 4:0); Lauscher 68' (5:0); Mundschin 82' (6:1); Lauscher (yellow card)	Summary	81' (5;1) Ackeret; (yellow card) Häni	Attendance: 7,000; Referee: (Switzerland) Jean-Marie Macheret, (Rueyres-St-Laurent)

1 September 1976 Round 4	Basel	1–4	Young Boys	St. Jakob Stadium, Basel
20:00	Maissen 20' (1:0); (yellow card) Mundschin	Summary	48' (1:1) Lorenz; 51' (1:2) Conz; 56' (1:3) Bruttin; 84' (1:4) Küttel; (yellow card) Eichenberger; (yellow card) Küttel	Attendance: 25,000; Referee: (Switzerland) Walter Hungerbühler (St. Gallen)

11 September 1976 Round 5	Grasshopper Club	1–1	Basel	Hardturm, Zürich
20.00	Bauer 24' (1:1)	Summary	13' (0:1) Muhmenthaler; (yellow card) von Wartburg	Attendance: 7,500; Referee: (Switzerland) André Favre (Échallens)

18 September 1976 Round 6	Zürich	1–0	Basel	Letzigrund, Zürich
17:00	Risi 67' (1:0)	FCB summary FCZ summary		Attendance: 15,000; Referee: (Switzerland) Gérard Racine (La Neuveville und Biel/Bienne)

2 October 1976 Round 7	Basel	4–1	Servette	St. Jakob Stadium, Basel
20:00	Nielsen 22' (1:0); Mundschin 38' (2:0); Maradan 55' (3:1); Stohler 85' (pen. 4:1)	Summary	50' (2:1) Barberis; (yellow card) Schnyder; (yellow card) Hussner	Attendance: 12,000; Referee: (Switzerland) Peter Scherz (Aegerten)

13 October 1976 Round 8	St. Gallen	1–1	Basel	Espenmoos, St. Gallen
20:15	Feuz 83' (1:1); Feuz (yellow card); Stöckl (yellow card)	Summary	48' (0:1) Maissen	Attendance: 6,200; Referee: (Switzerland) André Daina (Éclépens)

23 October 1976 Round 9	Basel	2–1	Sion	St. Jakob Stadium, Basel
20:00	Maissen 28' (1:0); Nielsen 63' (2:1)	Summary	44' (1:1) Lopez; (yellow card) Coutaz	Attendance: 4,500; Referee: (Switzerland) Attilio Bignasca (Lugano)

Round 10	Bellinzona	PP	Basel	Stadio Comunale Bellinzona
		[ Summary]

6 November 1976 Round 11	Basel	3–1	Xamax	St. Jakob Stadium, Basel
18:00	Demarmels 3' (1:0); Tanner 26' (2:1); Mundschin 32' (3:1)	Summary	15' (1:1) Rub	Attendance: 5,000; Referee: (Switzerland) René Maire (Chêne-Bougeries, Genève)

13 November 1976 Round 12	Chênois	1–2	Basel	Stade des Trois-Chêne, Thônex
17:30	Castella 28' (1:0)	Summary	36' (1:1) Ramseier; 57' (1:2) Marti; (yellow card) Tanner; (yellow card) Lauscher	Attendance: 2,500; Referee: (Switzerland) Ernest Guignet (Yverdon-les-Bains)

20 November 1976 Round 13	Basel	2–2	Lausanne-Sport	St. Jakob Stadium, Basel
20:00	Lauscher 8' (1:0); Stohler 18' (2:0)	Summary	36' (2:1) Traber; 70' (2:2) Devčić; (yellow card) Loichat	Attendance: 7,500; Referee: (Switzerland) Otto Wyniger (Wetzikon)

27 November 1976 Round 14	Winterthur	2–3	Basel	Schützenwiese, Winterthur
16:30	R. Meier 51' (1:1); Thygesen 82' (2:3)	Summary	22' (0:1) Marti; 61' (1:2) Maissen; 77' (1:3) Maissen	Attendance: 3,000; Referee: (Switzerland) Bruno Della Bruna (Lunimo)

5 December 1976 Round 15	Young Boys	0–6	Basel	Wankdorf Stadium, Bern
14:30	Rebmann (yellow card)	Summary	26' (0:1) Marti; 37' (0:2) Marti; 42' (0:3) Ramseier; 53' (0:4) Demarmels; 77' (0:5) Lauscher; 88' (0:6) Demarmels; (yellow card) Mundschin	Attendance: 14,000; Referee: (Switzerland) René Kellenberger (Herisau)

12 December 1976 Round 10	Bellinzona	1–2	Basel	Stadio Comunale Bellinzona
14:45	Leoni 53' (1:2)	Summary	22' (0:1) Tanner; 52' (0:2) Marti; (yellow card) Fischli	Attendance: 3,500; Referee: (Switzerland) Otto Isler (Zürich)

26 February 1977 Round 16	Basel	1–3	Zürich	St. Jakob Stadium, Basel
17:30	Demarmels 69' (1:2)	FCZ summary FCB summary	5' (0:1) Cucinotta; 39' (0:2) Risi; 74' (1:3) Cucinotta	Attendance: 17,000; Referee: (Switzerland) Ernest Guignet (Yverdon-les-Bains)
Note: Corners: 12:2

6 March 1977 Round 17	Servette	2–2	Basel	Charmilles Stadium, Geneva
14:45	Barberis 18' (1:1); Pfister 66' (2:1)	Summary	2' (pen. 0:1) Maradan; 89' (2:2) Nielsen	Attendance: 12,000; Referee: (Switzerland) Rudolf Renggli (Stans and Luzern)

12 March 1977 Round 18	Basel	4–2	St. Gallen	St. Jakob Stadium, Basel
20:00	Biger 35' (o.g.); Maissen 60' (2:1); Schönenberger 61' (3:1); Maradan 68' (pen. 4:1)	Summary	(yellow card) 31' Niggl; 59' (1:1) Stöckl; (yellow card) 65' Oettli; 87' (4:2) Graf	Attendance: 5,500; Referee: (Switzerland) Peter Scherz (Aegerten)

26 March 1977 Round 19	Sion	0–0	Basel	Stade Tourbillon, Sion
20:15		Summary		Attendance: 3,000; Referee: (Switzerland) Werner Bösch (Sutz-Lattrigen)

2 April 1977 Round 20	Basel	4–3	Bellinzona	St. Jakob Stadium, Basel
20:00	Mundschin 2' (1:0); Ramseier 3' (2:0); Lauscher 20' (3:1); Muhmenthaler 73' (4:2); Fischli (yellow card)	Summary	6' (2:1) Bang; 30' (3:2) Bang; 75' (4:3) Tagli; (yellow card) Pestoni	Attendance: 4,000; Referee: (Switzerland) Alfred Heinis (Ammannsegg, Biberist)

7 April 1977 Round 21	Xamax	0–2	Basel	Stade de la Maladière (1924), Neuchâtel
20:00		Summary	21' (0:1) Lauscher; 58' (0:2) Demarmels	Attendance: 6,400; Referee: (Switzerland) René Kellenberger (Herisau)

16 April 1977 Round 22	Basel	3–2	Grasshopper Club	St. Jakob Stadium, Basel
20:00	Muhmenthaler 59' (1:1); Lauscher 62' (2:1); Tanner 81' (3:1)	Summary	37' (0:1) Netzer; 90' (3:2) Bosco	Attendance: 14,000; Referee: (Switzerland) Peter Scherz (Aegerten)

==== Qualifying phase table ====
Pos	Team	Pld	W	D	L	GF	GA	GD	Pts	Qualification
1	Servette	22	14	7	1	68	27	+41	35	To championship round halved points (rounded up) as bonus
2	Basel	22	14	5	3	54	30	+24	33	To championship round halved points (rounded up) as bonus
3	Zürich	22	12	7	3	49	18	+31	31	To championship round halved points (rounded up) as bonus
4	Neuchâtel Xamax	22	10	7	5	37	27	+10	27	To championship round halved points (rounded up) as bonus
5	Young Boys	22	8	9	5	37	34	+3	25	To championship round halved points (rounded up) as bonus
6	Grasshopper Club	22	7	8	7	41	28	+13	22	To championship round halved points (rounded up) as bonus
7	Lausanne-Sport	22	8	6	8	39	31	+8	22	To relegation play-out round halved points (rounded up) as bonus
8	Chênois	22	6	8	8	29	39	−10	20	To relegation play-out round halved points (rounded up) as bonus
9	Sion	22	4	10	8	19	32	−13	18	To relegation play-out round halved points (rounded up) as bonus
10	St. Gallen	22	5	6	11	26	40	−14	16	To relegation play-out round halved points (rounded up) as bonus
11	Bellinzona	22	3	2	17	19	73	−54	8	To relegation play-out round halved points (rounded up) as bonus
12	Winterthur	22	1	5	16	19	58	−39	7	To relegation play-out round halved points (rounded up) as bonus

Source: rsssf.com
Rules for classification: 1) Points; 2) Goal difference; 3) Goals scored;

==== Championship group matches ====
Round 1	Basel	PP	Xamax	St. Jakob Stadium, Basel
		[ Summary]

7 May 1977 Round 2	Grasshopper Club	6–1	Basel	Hardturm, Zürich
20:00	Cornioley 10' (1:0); Becker 32' (2:0); Ponte 58' (3:0); Cornioley 61' (4:0); Cornioley 73' (5:0); Bosco 75' (6:0)	Summary	87' (5:1) von Wartburg	Attendance: 5,800; Referee: (Switzerland) René Kellenberger (Herisau)

10 May 1977 Round 1	Basel	3–1	Xamax	St. Jakob Stadium, Basel
20:00	Stohler 62' (1:0); Schönenberger 68' (2:0); Maissen 74' (3:0)	Summary	81' (3:1) Elsig	Attendance: 7,000; Referee: (Switzerland) Bruno Galler (Kirchdorf, Bern)

14 May 1977 Round 3	Basel	2–0	Servette	St. Jakob Stadium, Basel
20:00	Demarmels 30' (1:0); Lauscher 66' (2:0)	Summary		Attendance: 19,000; Referee: (Switzerland) Gérard Racine (La Neuveville)

21 May 1977 Round 4	Zürich	3–3	Basel	Letzigrund, Zürich
20:00	Cucinotta 40' (1:0); Risi 42' (2:0); Cucinotta 72' (3:3)	FCZ summary FCB summary	54' (2:1) Schönenberger; 55' (2:2) Stohler; 61' (2:3) Demarmels; (yellow card) Lauscher; (yellow card) Maissen	Attendance: 11,500; Referee: (Switzerland) Rudolf Renggli Luzern
Note: Corners 6:13

28 May 1977 Round 5	Basel	2–0	Young Boys	St. Jakob Stadium, Basel
20:00	Maissen (yellow card) 36'; Ramseier 40' (1:0); Mundschin 55' (2:0)	Summary		Attendance: 16,000; Referee: (Switzerland) Alfred Heinis (Ammannsegg, Biberist)

1 June 1977 Round 6	Xamax	0–0	Basel	Stade de la Maladière (1924), Neuchâtel
20:15		Summary		Attendance: 9,500; Referee: (Switzerland) Jakob Baumann (Schaffhausen)

11 June 1977 Round 7	Basel	2–3	Grasshopper Club	St. Jakob Stadium, Basel
20:00	Nielsen 17' (1:0) von Wartburg 43' (2:0); Mundschin (yellow card); Demarmels (yellow card)	Summary	64' (o.g. 2:1) Ramseier; 77' (2:2) Netzer; 82' (2:3) Seiler; (yellow card) Becker; (yellow card) Netzer	Attendance: 14,000; Referee: (Switzerland) Bruno della Bruna (Lumino)

18 June 1977 Round 8	Servette	2–0	Basel	Charmilles Stadium, Geneva
20:30	Andrey 33' (1:0); Thouvenel 81' (2:0)	Summary	(yellow card) Müller; (yellow card) Demarmels	Attendance: 16,500; Referee: (Switzerland) Gérard Racine (La Neuveville)

22 June 1977 Round 9	Basel	3–1	Zürich	St. Jakob Stadium, Basel
20:00	Nielsen (yellow card) 33'; Nielsen 53' (1:0); Tanner 57' (2:0); Maissen 71' (3:0)	FCZ summary FCB summary	89' (3:1) Kuhn	Attendance: 14,000; Referee: (Switzerland) André Daina (Éclépens)

25 June 1977 Round 10	Young Boys	0–3	Basel	Wankdorf Stadium, Bern
20:00		Summary	17' (0:1) Mundschin; 21' (0:2) Mundschin; 43' (0:3) Stohler	Attendance: 13,000; Referee: (Switzerland) Ernest Guignet (Yverdon-les-Bains)

==== Championship table ====
Pos	Team	Pld	W	D	L	GF	GA	GD	BP	Pts	Qualification
1	Basel]	10	5	2	3	19	16	+3	17	29	Championship winners, qualified for 1977–78 European Cup
2	Servette	10	5	1	4	16	14	+2	18	29	Play-off losers, qualified for 1977–78 UEFA Cup
3	Zürich	10	5	1	4	24	18	+6	16	27	qualified for 1977–78 UEFA Cup and entered 1977 Intertoto Cup
4	Grasshopper Club	10	5	2	3	15	10	+5	11	23	qualified for 1977–78 UEFA Cup and entered 1977 Intertoto Cup
5	Xamax	10	3	1	6	14	18	−4	14	21	
6	Young Boys	10	3	1	6	12	24	−12	13	20	Swiss Cup winners, qualified for 1977–78 Cup Winners' Cup and entered 1977 Intertoto Cup

Source: rsssf.com
Rules for classification: 1) Points; 2) Goal difference within the league, but play-off for the title.

==== Play-off match ====
28 June 1977 Play-Off	Basel	2–1	Servette	Wankdorf Stadium, Bern
20:15	Mundschin 37' von Wartburg 75'	Report	30' Müller; (yellow card) 66' Thouvenel; (yellow card) 77' Guyot	Attendance: 55,000; Referee: (Switzerland) Rudolf Renggli (Stans and Luzern)

=== Swiss Cup ===
26 September 1976 Round of 32	Fribourg	1–2 (a.e.t.)	Basel	Stade Universitaire, Fribourg
20:15	Dorthe (yellow card); Amantini 88' (1:1)	Summary	57' (0:1) Marti; 93' (1:2) Demarmels	Attendance: 3,200; Referee: (Switzerland) Alfred Heinis (Ammannsegg, Biberist)

16 October 1976 Round of 16	Xamax	4–1 (a.e.t.)	Basel	Stade de la Maladière, Neuchâtel
18:00	Bonny 78' (1:1); Rub 110' (2:1); Decastel 117' (3:1); Guggisberg 120' (4:1)	Summary	22' (0:1) Marti	Attendance: 5,000; Referee: (Switzerland) Gottlieb Barmettler (Luzern)

=== Swiss League Cup ===
7 August 1976 Round of 32	Grenchen	1–2	Basel	Stadium Brühl, Grenchen
20:15	Kodric 35' (1:1)	Summary	22' (0:1) Marti; 78' (1:2) Stohler	Attendance: 1,700; Referee: (Switzerland) André Daina (Éclépens)

13 February 1977 Round of 16	Luzern	2–2 (4–3 p)	Basel	Stadion Allmend, Luzern
14:30	Waeber 53' (1:0); Christen 117' (2:2)	Summary	85' (1:1) Marti; 93' (1:2) Maissen	Attendance: 1,800; Referee: (Switzerland) Attilio Bignasca (Lugano)

=== UEFA Cup ===
First round

14 September 1976 First leg	Glentoran F.C. (Northern Ireland)	3–2	(Switzerland) Basel	The Oval, Belfast
17:00	Feeney 12' (1:0); Feeney 42' (2:1); Dickenson 51' (3:1)	UEFA Report; FCB Summary	26' (1:1) Maissen; (yellow card) 52' Lauscher; 73' (3:2) Ramseier	Attendance: 3,000; Referee: (Sweden) Rolf Ericsson

29 September 1976 Second leg	Basel (Switzerland)	3–0	(Northern Ireland) Glentoran F.C.	St. Jakob Stadium, Basel
20:00	Eigil Nielsen 33' (1:0); Mundschin 35' (2:0); Demarmels 73' (3:0)	UEFA Summary; FCB Summary	(yellow card) 52' McCreery	Referee: (Italy) Cesare Gussoni

Basel won 5–3 on aggregate.

Second round

20 October 1976 First leg	Basel (Switzerland)	1–1	(Spain) Athletic Bilbao	Basel
20:00	Marti 2'	UEFA Summary; FCB Summary	45' Madariaga	Stadium: St. Jakob Stadium; Attendance: 15,000; Referee: Rudi Glöckner (East Germany)

3 November 1976 Second leg	Athletic Bilbao (Spain)	3–1 (4–2 agg.)	(Switzerland) Basel	Bilbao
20:00	Villar 45' (1:0); Carlos 61' (2:0); Carlos 68' (3:1)	UEFA Summary; FCB Summary	66' (2:1) Marti	Stadium: San Mamés; Attendance: 35,000; Referee: (England) Patrick Partridge

Athletic Bilbao won 4–2 on aggregate.

=== Cup of the Alps ===
Group B

17 July 1976 round 1	Basel (Switzerland)	2–3	(France) Nantes	St. Jakob Stadium Basel
17:30	Lauscher 39' (1:0); Tanner 88' (2:3)	Summary	48' (pen. 1:1) Bossis; 61' (1:2) Rampillon; 65' (1:3) Rampillon	Attendance: 2,000; Referee: (France) Kondrad

24 July 1976 round 2	Nantes (France)	1–1	(Switzerland) Basel	Nantes
	Bargas 5' (1:0)	Summary	15' (1:1) Muhmenthaler	Attendance: 3,500; Referee: (Switzerland) Ernest Guignet (Yverdon-les-Bains)

27 July 1976 round 3	Basel (Switzerland)	3–1	(France) Metz	St. Jakob Stadium Basel
20:00	Marti 38' (1:0); Muhmenthaler 56' (2:0); Tanner 59' (3:0)	Summary	73' (3:1) Hausknecht	Attendance: 1,300; Referee: (France) Jean-Claude Martin Lyon

31 July 1976 round 4	Metz (France)	2–0	(Switzerland) Basel	Stade Saint-Symphorien, Metz
	Zénier 10' (1:0); Zénier 14' (2:0)	Summary		Attendance: 2,000; Referee: (Switzerland) Peter Scherz (Aegerten)

NB: teams did not play compatriots

Group table

Pos	Team	Pld	W	D	L	GF	GA	GD	BP	Pts
1	Servette	4	3	1	0	10	7	+3	0	7 (Note: 1 bonus point awarded for victory by 3 or more goals)
2	Metz	4	1	1	2	8	9	−1	0	3
3	Basel	4	1	1	2	6	7	−1	0	3
4	Nantes	4	1	1	2	6	7	−1	0	3

== See also ==
- History of FC Basel
- List of FC Basel players
- List of FC Basel seasons

== Sources and references ==
- Rotblau: Jahrbuch Saison 2015/2016. Publisher: FC Basel Marketing AG. ISBN 978-3-7245-2050-4
- Switzerland 1976–77 at RSSSF
- Swiss League Cup at RSSSF
- Cup of the Alps 1976 at RSSSF
