= Manfred Jungk =

German footballer

Personal information
- Full name: Manfred Jungk
- Date of birth: 12 May 1955 (age 71)
- Position: Defender

Senior career*
Years	Team	Apps	(Gls)
1978–1979	SV Weil		
1979–1980	FC Basel	3	(0)
- * Club domestic league appearances and goals

Manfred Jungk (born 12 May 1955) is a German retired footballer who played in the late 1970s as defender.

Jungk joined FC Basel's first team for their 1979–80 season under head-coach Helmut Benthaus. After playing in seven test games, Jungk played his domestic league debut for the club in the home game in the St. Jakob Stadium on 11 August as Basel won 2–1 against Sion.

The season 1979–80 Nationalliga A was an exciting season. After the Qualifying phase Servette, Grasshopper Club and Basel were within three points of each other. The close rivalry remained until the end of the season. In the second last game Basel were hosts to Servette, winning 1–0. In the last match of the season Basel were away against Zürich. Winning 4–2 Basel became champions and were two points ahead of both Grasshoppers and Servette who finished second and third respectively.

He was only one season with the club and during this time Jungk played a total of 16 games for Basel scoring one goal. Three of these games were in the Nationalliga A and 13 were friendly games. He scored his only goal in the test match on 29 July 1979 as Basel won against a Niederzierer XI 7–0 and it was the last goal of the match.

== Sources ==
- Die ersten 125 Jahre. Publisher: Josef Zindel im Friedrich Reinhardt Verlag, Basel. ISBN 978-3-7245-2305-5
- Verein "Basler Fussballarchiv" Homepage
