= Ernst Schleiffer =

Swiss footballer (born 1957)

Personal information
- Full name: Ernst Schleiffer
- Date of birth: 5 December 1957 (age 68)
- Place of birth: Aarberg, Switzerland
- Height: 1.80 m (5 ft 11 in)
- Position: Defender

Senior career*
Years	Team	Apps	(Gls)
1978–1979	Neuchâtel Xamax	7	(0)
1979–1981	FC Basel	30	(0)
1981–1983	FC Grenchen	60	(5)
1983–1985	FC La Chaux-de-Fonds	50	(1)
1985–1986	FC Biel-Bienne	29	(0)
1986–1989	FC Grenchen	92	(4)
Total		268	(10)
- * Club domestic league appearances and goals

Ernst Schleiffer (born 5 December 1957) is a Swiss retired footballer who played in the late 1970s and 1980s as defender.

Schleiffer first played for Neuchâtel Xamax and he made seven appearances for them during the 1978–79 Nationalliga A season.

Schleiffer then joined FC Basel's first team for their 1979–80 season under head-coach Helmut Benthaus. After playing in seven test games Schleiffer played his debut for his new club in the first round of the Swiss League Cup on 4 August 1979 as he was substituted in for Arthur von Wartburg in the 72 minute. But he could not save the team from being defeated 0–1 and being knocked out of the tournament by the Young Boys. Schleiffer played his domestic league debut for the club in the home game in the St. Jakob Stadium on 11 August as Basel won 2–1 against Sion.

The season 1979–80 Nationalliga A was an exciting season. After the Qualifying phase Servette, Grasshopper Club and Basel were within three points of each other. The close rivalry remained until the end of the season. In the second last game Basel were hosts to Servette, winning 1–0. In the last match of the season Basel were away against Zürich. Winning 4–2 Basel became champions and were two points ahead of both Grasshoppers and Servette who finished second and third respectively.

Schleiffer stayed with the club for two seasons. In these two seasons Schleiffer played a total of 70 games for Basel scoring two goals. Both of these goals were scored in the test match on 10 October 1979 as Basel beat German club SV Weil 5–0. Thirty of these games were in the Nationalliga A, one in the League Cuo, five in the Swiss Cup, two in the European Cup and 32 were friendly games.

After his time with Basel Schleiffer moved on to play two seasons for Grenchen in the Natinalliga B, the second tier of Swiss football. He then played two seasons for La Chaux-de-Fonds and one for Biel-Bienne before he returned to Grenchen, where he ended his active playing career in 1989.

== Sources ==
- Die ersten 125 Jahre. Publisher: Josef Zindel im Friedrich Reinhardt Verlag, Basel. ISBN 978-3-7245-2305-5
- Verein "Basler Fussballarchiv" Homepage
