= Hans Küng (footballer) =

Swiss footballer (born 1949)

Personal information
- Date of birth: 24 April 1949 (age 77)
- Place of birth: Weinfelden, Switzerland
- Height: 1.78 m (5 ft 10 in)
- Position: Goalkeeper

Youth career
- –1967: FC Amriswil

Senior career*
Years	Team	Apps	(Gls)
1967–1968	FC Amriswil		
1968–1975	FC Winterthur	122	(0)
1975–1977	Neuchâtel Xamax	57	(0)
1977–1983	FC Basel	154	(0)

International career
1974–1977	Switzerland	5	(0)
- * Club domestic league appearances and goals

Hans Küng (born 24 April 1949) is a Swiss retired footballer who played as goalkeeper in the late 1960s, 1970s and early 1980s.

== Club career ==
Born in Weinfelden Küng played his youth football with the local club in Amriswil. Küng came to FC Winterthur from the first division club FC Amriswil in 1968, after the Winterthur team manager noticed him in a cup game against them in November 1968. In Winterthur he was first signed as the third goalie, but during his first two seasons with the club he did not once play for their first team.

This changed in the autumn of 1970 when coach Willy Sommer gave him preference over regular goalkeeper Werner Frei. During the so-called "glorious years of FC Winterthur" between 1970 and 1975 he was the team's first goalkeeper. With Küng as first goalie Winterthur reached the Swiss League Cup final twice and the Swiss Cup final once. In the League Cup final 1972 they were defeated 1–4 by Basel and a year later 1973 4–5 in a penalty shoot-out by Grasshopper Club. In the Swiss Cup final on 31 March 1975 they were also defeated by Basel 2–1.

In the off-season 1975 Küng moved on to play for Neuchâtel Xamax. Then in the summer of 1977 he moved on to play for FC Basel. With Basel he became Swiss champion in 1980. Küng joined Basel's first team for their 1977–78 season under manager Helmut Benthaus. After playing in three test games, one League Cup match and two games in the Cup of the Alps, Küng played his domestic league debut for the club in the away game on 24 September 1977 as Basel were defeated 0–2 by Servette.

In their 1979–80 season Basel won the Swiss Championship. Between the years 1977 and 1983 Küng played a total of 252 games for Basel. 154 of these games were in the Nationalliga A, 32 in the Swiss Cup and Swiss League Cup, 16 were in the European competitions (European Cup, UEFA Cup and Cup of the Alps) and 50 were friendly games.

== International career ==
In 1974 he played in goal for the Swiss national team for the first time under head coach René Hüssy. His debut was on 12 April 1974 as Switzerland were defeated 0–1 by Hungary. He played five times for his country.

== Honours ==
Winterthur

- Swiss League Cup runner-up: 1972, 1973
- Swiss Cup runner-up: 1974–75

Basel

- Swiss championship: 1979–80

== Sources ==
- Hans Küng at National-Football-Teams.com
- Rotblau: Jahrbuch Saison 2017/2018. Publisher: FC Basel Marketing AG. ISBN 978-3-7245-2189-1
- Die ersten 125 Jahre. Publisher: Josef Zindel im Friedrich Reinhardt Verlag, Basel. ISBN 978-3-7245-2305-5
- Verein "Basler Fussballarchiv" Homepage
