= Joseph Küttel =

Swiss footballer (1952-1997)

Personal information
- Full name: Joseph Küttel
- Date of birth: 27 December 1952
- Place of birth: Emmen, Switzerland
- Date of death: 25 February 1997 (aged 44)
- Position: Forward

Youth career
- until 1971: FC Emmenbrücke

Senior career*
Years	Team	Apps	(Gls)
1971–1972	FC Emmenbrücke		
1972–1976	FC Luzern	89	(38)
1976–1979	BSC Young Boys	100	(38)
1979–1981	FC Basel	51	(24)
1981–1983	FC Lugano	47	(12)
1983–1984	FC Emmenbrücke		
- * Club domestic league appearances and goals

Joseph Küttel (27 December 1952 – 25 February 1997) was a Swiss professional footballer who played in the 1970s and 1980s as a forward.

Küttel played his youth football for local club FC Emmenbrücke and advanced to their first team in 1971.

A year later he signed for Luzern who at that time played in the Nationalliga B, the second tier of Swiss football. In his first season with his new club, Küttel played 25 of the club's 26 games and scored eight goals. Luzern finished level on points, joint second with Chênois, but missed out on promotion losing the play-off match after extra time. The following season Küttel again played 25 of the club's 26 games, but this season he scored 18 goals. He was the league's second-top scorer and the team were division champions and achieved promotion.

In the top flight of football, the 1974–75 Nationalliga A season did not run very well for the club and they suffered relegation. Küttel stayed with the club in their attempt to regain promotion.

However, during the winter break Küttel was signed by Young Boys. At the end of the following season, 1976–77, Küttel and his club won the Swiss Cup. In the semifinal against Lausanne-Sport Seppi Küttel scored the only goal of the match in the 120th minute and so shot the Young Boys into the cup final. In the final on 11 April 1977 Young Boys beat St. Gallen 1–0. In the high-scoring league match on 14 May 1977 in the Letzigrund against Zürich Küttel scored a hat-trick within 17 minutes and four goals in total as Young Boys won 6–3. In the 1978–79 season the Young Boys again reached the cup final, which was drawn 1–1 with Servette, but in the replay they were defeated 2–3.

Küttel joined Basel's first team for their 1979–80 season under trainer Helmut Benthaus. After eight test games and one in the Swiss League Cup, Küttel made his domestic league debut for his new club in the home game in the St. Jakob Stadium on 11 August. He scored his first goal for them in the same game as Basel won 2–1 against Sion. The 1979–80 Nationalliga A was an exciting season. After the qualifying phase, Servette, Grasshopper Club and Basel were within three points of each other. The close rivalry remained until the end of the season. In the second last game Basel were hosts to Servette, winning 1–0. In the last match of the season Basel were away against Zürich. A 4–2 victory confirmed Basel as champions, two points ahead of both Grasshoppers and Servette who finished second and third respectively.

Erni Maissen and Detlev Lauscher led the team's top-scorers list after the qualifying phase, both with 13 league goals. At the end of the season they were joined by Küttel: all three managed to score 18 league goals during the season. In the qualification round 22, at home to Xamax on 26 April, Küttel scored four goals in a 6–1 win.

Küttel stayed with the club for two seasons, in which he played 88 games for Basel and scored 38 goals; 51 games were in the Nationalliga A, 6 in cup matches, 2 in the European Cup and 29 were friendly games. He scored 24 goals in the domestic league, 3 in the Swiss Cup and the other 11 in friendlies.

Following his time in Basel, Küttel moved on to play two seasons for Lugano in the second tier of Swiss football, before ending his active professional career and returning to play for his club of origin FC Emmenbrücke.

== Sources ==
- Rotblau: Jahrbuch Saison 2017/2018. Publisher: FC Basel Marketing AG. ISBN 978-3-7245-2189-1
- Die ersten 125 Jahre. Publisher: Josef Zindel im Friedrich Reinhardt Verlag, Basel. ISBN 978-3-7245-2305-5
- Verein "Basler Fussballarchiv" Homepage
