= Martin Mullis =

Swiss footballer (born 1957)

Personal information
- Full name: Martin Mullis
- Date of birth: 31 August 1957 (age 69)
- Place of birth: Bad Ragaz, Switzerland
- Positions: Midfielder; forward

Senior career*
Years	Team	Apps	(Gls)
1971–1980	FC St. Gallen	6	(1)
1980–1982	FC Basel	43	(5)
1984–1985	FC Baden	29	(11)
1985–1987	FC Wettingen	30	(3)
- * Club domestic league appearances and goals

Martin Mullis (born 31 August 1957) is a Swiss former footballer who played in the late 1970s and 1980s, mainly as a forward but also as a midfielder.

== Football career ==
Mullis first played for St. Gallen and joined Basel's first team in for their 1979–80 season under manager Helmut Benthaus. Mullis played his domestic league debut for his new club in the home game on 13 September 1980 in the St. Jakob Stadium as Basel won 1–0 against his former club St. Gallen. He was substituted in at half time for the injured Jörg Stohler. He scored his first goal for the club on 27 September in the Swiss Cup away game against Fribourg as Basel won 3–0. He scored his first league goal for his club on 8 March 1981 in the away game as Basel drew 2–2 with Chênois.

Staying with the club for two seasons Mullis played a total of 76 games for Basel scoring a total of 10 goals. 43 of these games were in the Nationalliga A, five in the Swiss Cup and Swiss League Cup, five in the Cup of the Alps and 51 were friendly games. He scored five goals in the domestic league, one in the Swiss Cup, two in the Cup of the Alps and the other five were scored during the test games.

After his time in Basel Mullis moved on to play one season for Baden in the Nationalliga B, second tier of Swiss football. Then he moved on again and played two seasons for Wettingen in the Nationalliga A.

== Private life ==
Martin Mullis was born and grew up in Bad Ragaz. He is single and has two daughters. Since 2014 he is the owner of Restaurant Central in the center of the town of his birth.

== Sources ==
- Die ersten 125 Jahre. Publisher: Josef Zindel im Friedrich Reinhardt Verlag, Basel. ISBN 978-3-7245-2305-5
- Verein "Basler Fussballarchiv" Homepage
