= Serge Duvernois =

French footballer (1960-2017)

Personal information
- Full name: Serge Duvernois
- Date of birth: 2 August 1960
- Place of birth: Saint-Maur-des-Fossés, France
- Date of death: 5 August 2017 (aged 57)
- Place of death: Pfastatt, France
- Height: 1.85 m (6 ft 1 in)
- Position: Defender

Youth career
- –1980: FC Saint-Louis Neuweg

Senior career*
Years	Team	Apps	(Gls)
1977–1980	FC Saint-Louis Neuweg		
1980–1983	FC Basel	40	(1)
1983–1984	FC Mulhouse	26	(0)
1984–1985	R.F.C. Seraing	26	(0)
1985–1992	FC Mulhouse	142	(7)
- * Club domestic league appearances and goals

Serge Duvernois (born 2 August 1960 in Saint-Maur-des-Fossés, died 5 August 2017 in Pfastatt) was a former French footballer who played as a defender during the late 1970s, the 1980s and the early 1990s.

Duvernois played his youth football with FC Saint-Louis Neuweg in Saint-Louis, Haut-Rhin. He advanced to their first team in the summer of 1977 and played regularly from the very beginning. However, at the end of the season the team were relegated from the third tier of French football to the fourth tier. Duvernois stayed with his team for another two seasons.

He began playing professionally with FC Basel in their 1980–81 season under head coach Helmut Benthaus. After playing in three test games Duvernois played his domestic league debut for his new club in the home game in the St. Jakob Stadium on 5 April 1981 as Basel won 3–0 against Chiasso. He scored his first goal for the club in the Swiss Cup third round in the away game on 26 September 1981. It was the second goal of the match and Basel went on to win 9–1. Duvernois scored his first league goal for his club in the home game on 24 April 1982. It was the winning goal of the match as Basel won 2–1 against Sion.

Duvernois spent three years at the Swiss club. During this time, he played a total of 65 games for Basel scoring a total of three goals. 40 of these games were in the Nationalliga A, five in the Swiss Cup, one in the Swiss League Cup, two in the Cup of the Alps and 17 were friendly games. He scored one goal in the domestic league, one in the cup and the other was scored during the test games.

Duvernois then signed for FC Mulhouse in 1983, but spent just one year there. He then moved on to R.F.C. Seraing of Belgium. However, he only stayed one year in Belgium and returned to Mulhouse in 1985. Here he went on to play for the club for another seven years, retiring in 1992. The team won promotion from the second tier in 1989, but were relegated again after one season. During this time, he also played for their reserve team.

== Sources ==
- Rotblau: Jahrbuch Saison 2017/2018. Publisher: FC Basel Marketing AG. ISBN 978-3-7245-2189-1
- Josef Zindel (2018). FC Basel 1893. Die ersten 125 Jahre (in German). Basel: Friedrich Reinhardt Verlag. ISBN 978-3-7245-2305-5.
- Verein "Basler Fussballarchiv" Homepage
