= Arthur von Wartburg =

Swiss footballer (born 1952)

Personal information
- Full name: Arthur von Wartburg
- Date of birth: 25 December 1952 (age 73)
- Height: 1.81 m (5 ft 11 in)
- Position: Midfielder

Youth career
- until 1972: Concordia Basel

Senior career*
Years	Team	Apps	(Gls)
1972–1973	FC Concordia Basel		
1973–1984	FC Basel	267	(16)
1984–1985	FC Grenchen	16	(6)

International career
1976–1977	Switzerland	5	(0)
- * Club domestic league appearances and goals

Arthur von Wartburg (born 25 December 1952) is a Swiss international footballer who played most of his football for FC Basel as midfielder.

== Club career ==
Von Wartburg played his youth football by Concordia Basel and advanced to their first team in 1972.

Von Wartburg joined Basel for their 1973–74 season under first team manager Helmut Benthaus. After playing in two test games, he played his domestic league debut for his new club in the home game at St. Jakob Stadium on 20 April 1974 as Basel drew 1–1 against St. Gallen. He scored his first goal for his club on 7 August 1974 in the Swiss League Cup against Luzern as Basel won 5–2. It was the team's 5th goal of the match.

In their 1974–75 season von Wartburg scored his first domestic league goal for his club on 31 August 1974 in the home game against Winterthur as Basel won by five goals to nil. Von Wartburg and his team ended the championship in fourth position. But in the Swiss Cup tournament they reached the final. The final was played on 31 March 1975 also in the Wankdorf Stadium in Bern against Winterthur. Otto Demarmels scored the opening goal for Basel, Meyer equalised and so the game went into extra time. Walter Balmer scored the winning goal for Basel after 115 minutes. Basel were Swiss Cup winners for the fifth time in the club's history.

Basel finished the 1975–76 league championship in third position with 34 points, 10 points behind FC Zürich. Of the 26 games, 13 were won, 8 drawn, 5 lost, with 59 goals and 38 conceded. Von Wartburg played 22 league games scoring three goals.

For von Wartburg the 1976–77 was again a very successful season. The league format was changed. Instead of 14 teams playing a single round robin, it now was reduced to 12 teams with a Qualifying phase and a championship round with the six top teams. This meant no longer 26 games, but now 22 plus 10. In the Qualifying phase Basel obtained 33 points and were just two points behind Servette. They managed to close the gap in the championship round and because both teams were level on points the championship was decided in a play-off match. This match was held on 26 June 1977. Basel's first goals was scored by Walter Mundschin and von Wartburg scored the winning goal as they won 2–1 and became Swiss champions. In the league von Wartburg played in 32 of the 33 matches scoring three goals.

During the season 1977–78 von Wartburg played 52 games including the test games and netted three times. The team fished the championship in third position. In both the national cup competitions they reached the semi-final but lost both. Arthur von Wartburg doesn't have a very good memories of the UEFA Cup match against VfB Stuttgart on 13 September 1978. The Germans played with all their stars, Hansi Müller, Dieter Hoeness, Hermann Ohlicher and the Förster brothers Karlheinz and Bernd. Basel took a 1–0 lead through Stohler. Then in the 40th minute, the reliable thinker and driver in midfield von Wartburg was given yellow-red for some unknown reason from Referee Brian McGinlay. Von Wartburg had to leave the place prematurely. The Germans turned the game and won it 3–2. That was to be von Wartburg's the only dismissal in his entire career.

During the 1978–79 season he played 57 games including the tests and tallied again three goals. Basel ended the league season sixth position after playing a disappointing championship round, losing six of the last seven games.

The season 1979–80 Nationalliga A was an exiting season. After the Qualifying phase Servette, Grasshopper Club and Basel were within three points of each other. The close rivalry remained until the end of the season. In the second last game Basel were hosts to Servette, winning 1–0, and in the last away against Zürich, winning 4–2. Basel became champions and were two points ahead of both Grasshoppers and Servette who fished second and third respectively. The team scored 91 league goals all in all. The team's top scorers were Detlev Lauscher, Joseph Küttel and Erni Maissen each of whom scored 18 league goals during the campaign. von Wartburg scored four in 32 outings and this was his second league championship title.

Von Wartburg played four further seasons for Basel. In the season 1980–81 he had 26 league appearances without scoring, in the 1981–82 season he had 30 league appearances scoring twice, in the 1982–83 season he played 22 league games without scoring and during the 1983–84 season he had 14 league appearances scoring once.

Between the years 1973 and 1984 von Wartburg played a total of 476 games for Basel scoring a total of 41 goals. 267 of these games were in the Nationalliga A, 29 in the Swiss Cup, 24 in the Swiss League Cup, six in the European Cup, four in the UEFA Cup, 25 in the Cup of the Alps and 121 were friendly games. He scored 16 goals in the domestic league, four were in the two cup competitions, three were in European competitions and the other 18 were scored during the test games.

After his time in Basel von Wartburg moved on to FC Grenchen in the Nationalliga B (second tier of Swiss football). During this season Grenchen played 30 games, winning 15 times, drawing 10 and losing only five times. With 40 points they ended the season as Nationalliga B champions and were promoted. Von Wartburg played for Grenchen just this one season and then he ended his active football career.

== International career ==
Arthur von Wartburg was called up for his country in the 1976–1977 season. He played his debut for Switzerland on 23 April 1977 as they were defeated 0–4 by France in a friendly game. He played four more games for his country including a qualifying match to the 1978 World Cup on 8 June 1977 against Sweden.

== Honours ==
Basel

- Swiss League: 1976-77, 1979-80
- Swiss Cup: 1974–75
- Cup of the Alps winner: 1981

Grenchen

- Nationalliga B champions: 1984–85

== Sources ==
- Rotblau: Jahrbuch Saison 2017/2018. Publisher: FC Basel Marketing AG. ISBN 978-3-7245-2189-1
- Die ersten 125 Jahre. Publisher: Josef Zindel im Friedrich Reinhardt Verlag, Basel. ISBN 978-3-7245-2305-5
- Verein "Basler Fussballarchiv" Homepage
- Arthur von Wartburg on FCB Homepage
