= Jean-Pierre Maradan =

Swiss footballer (born 1954)

Personal information
- Date of birth: 19 February 1954 (age 72)
- Place of birth: Switzerland
- Position: Defender

Youth career
- until 1970: FC Deitingen
- 1968–1979: FC Grenchen

Senior career*
Years	Team	Apps	(Gls)
1970–1976	FC Grenchen		
1976–1984	FC Basel		
1984–1986	FC Grenchen		

International career
1977	Switzerland	1	(0)
- * Club domestic league appearances and goals

Jean-Pierre Maradan (born 19 February 1954) is a former Swiss football player who played as a defender during the 1970s and 1980s.

Maradan was brought up in Deitingen in the canton of Solothurn and started his football with the youth teams of the local football club. He transferred to FC Grenchen in 1970, played for their youth team Interregional and their first team Nationalliga B. The team won the Uhrencup 1971. They also won promotion to the Nationalliga A in 1971, but were relegated again at the end of the season 1972–73 .

In the summer of 1976 Maradan transferred to FC Basel, with coach Helmut Benthaus, back into the Nationalliga A. Despite the team already having a number of especially good players (Mundschin, Stohler, Geisser, Maissen, Ramseier, Muhmenthaler and Fischli) the right footed Maradan quickly became a key player. With Basel he won the Swiss Championship twice and played in the Swiss Cup Final 1982, but they were defeated 1:0 by FC Sion. He was Coppa delle Alpi winner once and four times winner of the Uhrencup. In the Uhrencup Final 1983 he scored the only goal of the game from the penalty spot.

Following his successful time in Basel, Maradan returned to his family in Grenchen. He played for FC Grenchen for another two years before he retired. With the team he won the Uhrencup again in 1985.

== Honours ==
Grenchen

- Uhrencup Winner: 1971, 1985
- Promotion to Nationalliga A: 1971

Basel

- Swiss National Championship: 1977, 1980
- Uhrencup Winner: 1978, 1979, 1980, 1983
- Coppa delle Alpi Winner: 1981
