= Erwin Meyer =

Swiss footballer (born 1957)

Erwin "James" Meyer
Personal information
- Full name: Erwin Meyer
- Date of birth: 26 November 1957
- Height: 1.70 m (5 ft 7 in)
- Position: Midfielder

Youth career
- until 1977: SC Emmen

Senior career*
Years	Team	Apps	(Gls)
1977–1978	SC Emmen		
1978–1980	FC Basel	13	(3)
1980–1983	FC Luzern	50	(7)
1983–1986	FC Aarau	41	(13)
1987–1988	FC Olten	17	(1)
- * Club domestic league appearances and goals

Erwin Meyer also known as James Meyer (born 26 November 1957) is a Swiss retired professional footballer who played in the 1970s and 1980s as midfielder.

== Football career ==
Meyer first played for SC Emmen. He joined FC Basel's first team for their 1978–79 season under head-coach Helmut Benthaus. For Basel Meyer first played in two Cup of the Alps games, then he played two games in the Swiss League Cup and then two test games. Then Meyer played his domestic league debut for the club in the away game on 12 August 1978 as Basel were defeated 1–2 by Chiasso. Meyer scored his first goal for his club on 31 March 1979 in the home game in the St. Jakob Stadium as Basel won 2–0 against Lausanne-Sport.

The season 1979–80 Nationalliga A was an exciting season. After the Qualifying phase Servette, Grasshopper Club and Basel were within three points of each other. The close rivalry remained until the end of the season. In the second last game Basel were hosts to Servette, winning 1–0. In the last match of the season Basel were away against Zürich. Winning 4–2 Basel became champions and were two points ahead of both Grasshoppers and Servette who finished second and third respectively.

Between the years 1978 and 1980 Meyer played a total of 39 games for Basel scoring a total of nine goals. 13 of these games were in the Nationalliga A, four in the Swiss League Cup, two in the Cup of the Alps and 20 were friendly games. He scored three goals in the domestic league, the other six were scored during the test games.

Following his time with Basel, Meyer moved on to play with Luzern under head-coach Paul Wolfisberg. After four seasons with Luzern, Meyer moved on to play for FC Aarau under head-coach Ottmar Hitzfeld and in the 1984–85 season they won the Swiss Cup.

== Private life ==
Following his successful football career Meyer some times lived outside the lines drawn by lawmakers. Meyer had to go to prison for the first time in 1988 when he and a colleague were stopped with two kilos of hashish in the car in Thionville on the French border. Eight and a half months in prison. In 1995 he was arrested in a restaurant. The police found more than one kilo of coke in his apartment and in his car. Market value: 180,000 Swiss Francs. During the investigation, Meyer continues to deal - and is caught again: three years in prison.

In 2015, Meyer was arrested on open street and put into custody. A year later the Lucerne police blow up the drug ring. Meyer had to go back to jail. This time for six years.

== Honours ==
Basel

- Swiss League champion: 1979-80

Aarau

- Swiss Cup winner: 1984–85

== Sources ==
- Die ersten 125 Jahre. Publisher: Josef Zindel im Friedrich Reinhardt Verlag, Basel. ISBN 978-3-7245-2305-5
- Verein "Basler Fussballarchiv" Homepage
