= René Hasler =

Swiss footballer (born 1948)

Personal information
- Date of birth: 18 June 1948 (age 78)
- Place of birth: Lucerne, Switzerland
- Height: 1.70 m (5 ft 7 in)
- Position: Defender

Senior career*
Years	Team	Apps	(Gls)
1969–1971	FC Zürich		
1971–1976	FC Basel		
1976–1979	Neuchâtel Xamax		
1979–1983	FC Basel		

International career
1972–1977	Switzerland	25	(?)
- * Club domestic league appearances and goals

René Hasler (born 18 June 1948) is a Swiss former footballer who played for FC Basel for most of his career, and the Swiss national team.

== Career ==
Hasler started his career at FC Zürich in 1969 and left two years later to join FC Basel, where he won two league titles consecutively in 1972 and 1973, and the Swiss Cup in 1975. He then moved to Neuchâtel Xamax in 1976 where he played for three years before returning to St. Jakob Stadium, where he helped Basel win another title in 1980.

Hasler earned 25 caps for the Swiss national team, the first of which coming on 21 October 1972 in a 0–0 draw with Italy in Bern. His last game in a Switzerland shirt was a 2–1 loss to Spain on 21 September 1977, also in Bern.

== Honours ==
Zürich

- Swiss Cup: 1970

Basel

- Swiss League: 1972, 1973, 1980
- Swiss Cup: 1975
- Swiss League Cup: 1973
