= Willy Sommer =

Swiss footballer and manager (1925-2001)

Personal information
- Date of birth: 15 February 1925
- Date of death: 9 July 2001 (aged 76)
- Position: Forward

Senior career*
Years	Team	Apps	(Gls)
–1963	FC Solothurn		

Managerial career
- 1963–1965: FC Solothurn
- 1967–1970: FC Fribourg
- 1970–1975: FC Winterthur
- 1975–1981: FC St. Gallen
- 1981–1983: FC Lugano
- 1983–1986: FC Wettingen
- * Club domestic league appearances and goals

Willy Sommer (15 February 1925 – 9 July 2001) was a Swiss football striker for FC Solothurn (1963) and later manager of FC Solothurn (1963-1965), FC Fribourg (1967-1970), FC Winterthur (1970-1975), FC St. Gallen (1975-1981), FC Lugano (1981-1983), and FC Wettingen (1983-1986).
