= Paul Friberg =

Swiss footballer (born 1959)

Personal information
- Date of birth: 22 March 1959 (age 67)
- Place of birth: Tavanasa, Switzerland
- Height: 1.72 m (5 ft 8 in)
- Position: Striker

Senior career*
| Years | Team | Apps | (Gls) |
| 1978–1985 | St. Gallen | 114 | (39) |
| 1985–1988 | Wettingen | 72 | (8) |
| 1988–1989 | FC Luzern | 22 | (3) |
| 1989–1991 | Chur | 12+ | (0+) |
- * Club domestic league appearances and goals

Paul Friberg (born 22 March 1959) is a Swiss football manager and former footballer.

== Early life ==
Friberg grew up in Tavanasa, Switzerland.

== Career ==
In 1988, Friberg signed for Swiss side FC Luzern, helping the club win their first league title.

== Style of play ==
Friberg mainly operated as a striker and was described as having a "cheeky and carefree game".

== Personal life ==
Besides playing football, Friberg enjoyed skiing.
