= Niederzier =

- Municipality
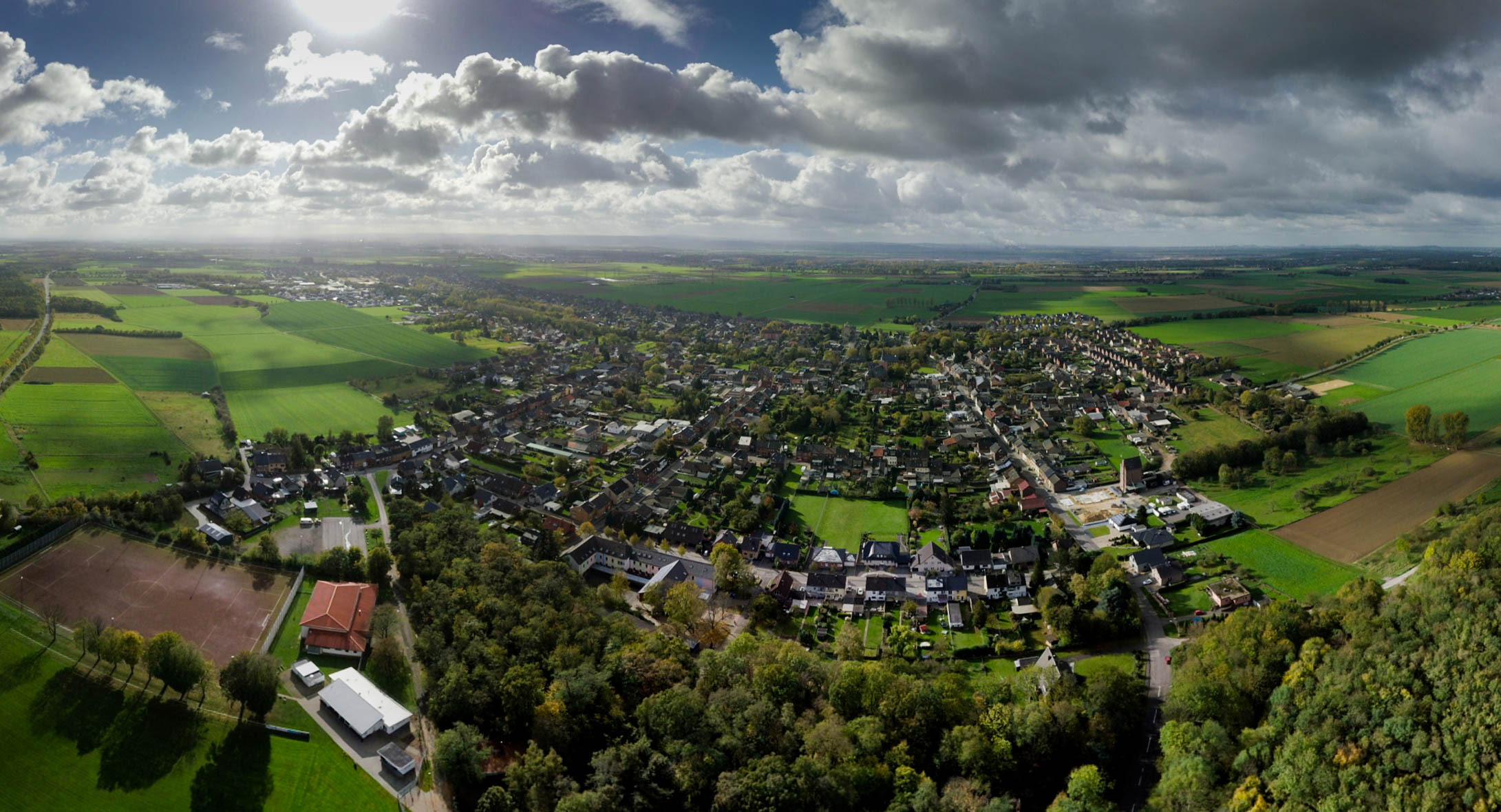

- Flag Coat of arms

- Location of Niederzier within Düren district
- Interactive map of Niederzier
- Location within Germany Location within North Rhine-Westphalia
- Coordinates: 50°52′59″N 06°28′00″E
- Country: Germany
- State: North Rhine-Westphalia
- Admin. region: Cologne
- District: Düren
- Subdivisions: 7

Government
  - Mayor (2020–25): Frank Rombey (SPD)

Area
  - Total: 63.46 km^{2} (24.50 sq mi)
- Elevation: 100 m (330 ft)

Population (2025-12-31)
  - Total: 15,055
  - Density: 237.2/km^{2} (614.4/sq mi)
- Time zone: UTC+01:00 (CET)
  - Summer (DST): UTC+02:00 (CEST)
- Postal codes: 52382
- Dialling codes: 02428
- Vehicle registration: DN
- Website: www.niederzier.de

Niederzier (German pronunciation: [ˈniːdɐtsiːɐ̯]) is a municipality in the district of Düren in the state of North Rhine-Westphalia, Germany. It is located approximately 10 km north of Düren, and 10 km south-east of Jülich.

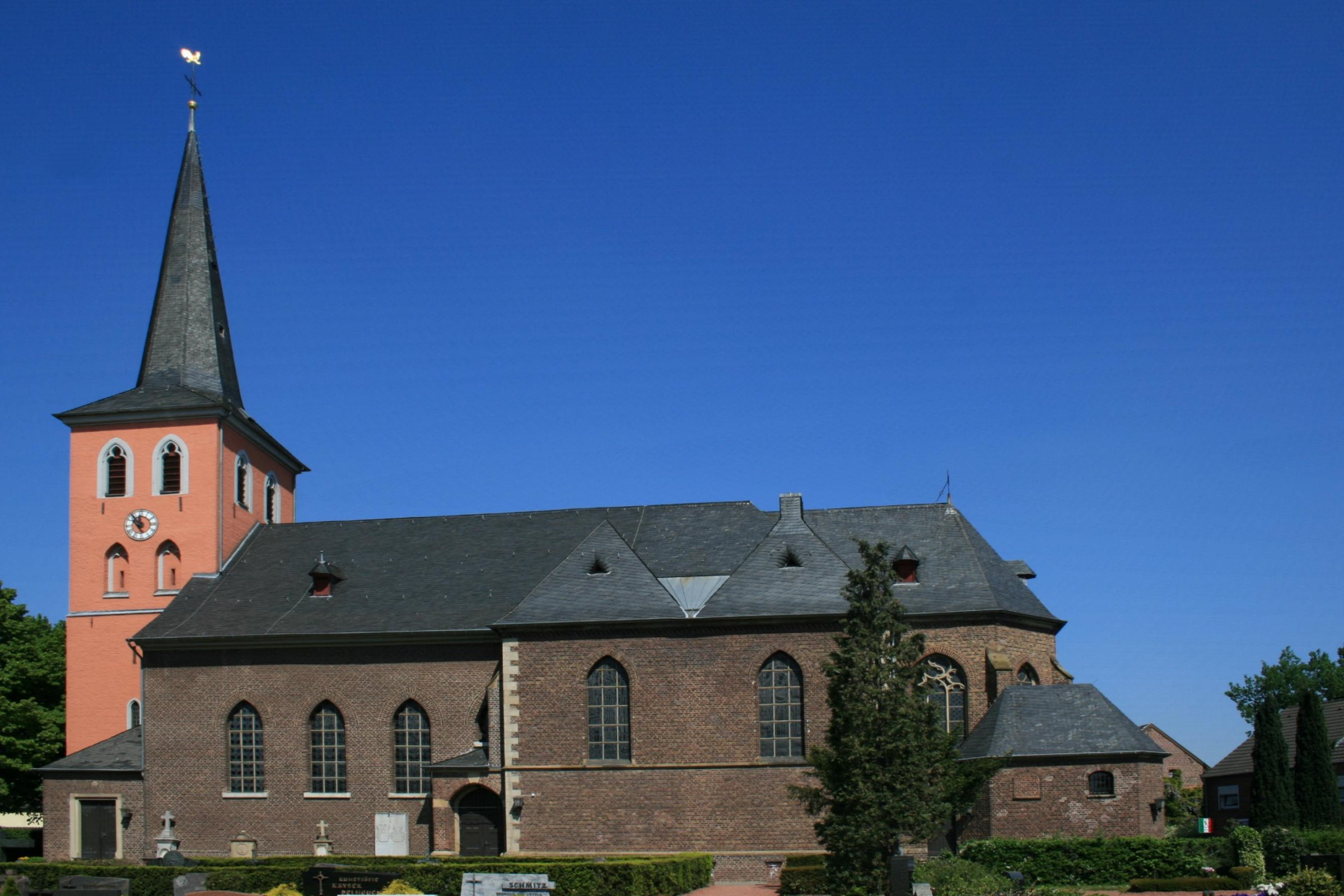
Niederzier Church St. Cäcilia

== Population ==
Historical population

Year	Pop.	±% p.a.
1965	9,884	—
1970	10,661	+1.53%
1975	11,292	+1.16%
1980	11,767	+0.83%
1985	11,988	+0.37%
1990	12,199	+0.35%
1995	13,176	+1.55%

Year	Pop.	±% p.a.
2000	14,075	+1.33%
2005	14,271	+0.28%
2010	14,003	−0.38%
2015	13,915	−0.13%
2020	14,154	+0.34%
2025	15,055	+1.24%

Source: Landesdatabank Nordrhein-Westfalen

== Personalities ==
- Viktor Schroeder (1922-2011), industrialist, patron and honorary citizen
- Karl Lauterbach (born 1963), doctor and politician (SPD), since 2005 Bundestag deputy
- Andrea Tillmanns (born 1972), author
