= Markus Tanner =

Swiss footballer (born 1954)

Personal information
- Date of birth: 15 January 1954 (age 72)
- Place of birth: Switzerland
- Height: 1.85 m (6 ft 1 in)
- Position: Striker

Senior career*
Years	Team	Apps	(Gls)
1973–1981	FC Basel		
1981–1985	FC Lucerne		
1985–1986	FC Zürich	16	(3)

International career^{‡}
1978–1981	Switzerland	10	(1)
- * Club domestic league appearances and goals as of 6 February 2017 ‡ National team caps and goals as of 23 November 2009

Markus Tanner (born 15 January 1954) is a Swiss former footballer who played as a striker.

He began his career with FC Basel during the 1970s, and later signed for FC Lucerne in 1981, where he played until 1985. He was also a Swiss internationalist with ten caps and one goal. He made his international debut against the Netherlands on 11 October 1978 in Bern, and played his last match against the same opposition on 1 September 1981 in Zürich.
