= Detlev Lauscher =

German footballer

Personal information
- Date of birth: 30 September 1952
- Place of birth: Übach-Palenberg, West Germany
- Date of death: 15 January 2010 (aged 57)
- Place of death: Basel, Switzerland
- Position: Striker

Youth career
- VfR Uebach-Palenberg

Senior career*
| Years | Team | Apps | (Gls) |
| 1971–1976 | 1. FC Köln | 80 | (10) |
| 1976–1981 | FC Basel | 134 | (52) |
| 1981–1984 | FC Luzern | 53 | (13) |
| 1984–1985 | Grasshopper | 15 | (3) |
- * Club domestic league appearances and goals

Detlev Lauscher (30 September 1952 – 15 January 2010) was a German footballer who played as a striker during the 1970s and 1980s. He was born in Übach-Palenberg, North Rhine-Westphalia.

Lauscher played five seasons for 1. FC Köln in the German first division, helping the club finish as runners-up in the league and cup during 1973.

Lauscher died in January 2010 of heart failure.
