= Erni Maissen =

Swiss footballer (born 1958)

Personal information
- Full name: Ernst Maissen
- Date of birth: 1 January 1958 (age 68)
- Place of birth: Basel, Switzerland
- Height: 1.70 m (5 ft 7 in)
- Positions: Midfielder; striker

Youth career
- –1974: FC Reinach
- 1974–1975: FC Basel

Senior career*
Years	Team	Apps	(Gls)
1975–1982	Basel	172	(60)
1982–1983	Zürich	24	(4)
1983–1987	Basel	104	(36)
1987–1989	Young Boys	40	(5)
1989–1991	Basel	61	(20)
1991–	FC Reinach		
Total		401	(125)

International career
1980–1988	Switzerland	29	(0)
- * Club domestic league appearances and goals

Ernst "Erni" Maissen (born 1 January 1958) is a Swiss former footballer who played as a midfielder or striker during the 1970s, 1980s and early 1990s. He is best known for his three spells at FC Basel.

== Career ==
Maissen played his youth football for local club FC Reinach, then moved on to play for the youth of FC Basel. He advanced to their first team for the 1975–76 season and signed his first professional contract under head-coach Helmut Benthaus. Maissen played his team debut for the club in the away game in the Cup of the Alps on 24 July 1976 as Basel played a 1–1 draw with Nantes Atlantique. Maissen then played one test match, in which he scored a goal, then he played his domestic league debut for the club in the away game in the Stade Olympique de la Pontaise on 21 August. He scored his first goal for his team in the same game and it was the match winner as Basel won 1–0 against Lausanne-Sport. Maissen started his career well, in the next two league games Maissen also scored in each and he also scored a goal in his first European appearance on 14 September in the 1976–77 UEFA Cup match against Glentoran In the test game against amateur club Derendingen on 6 October he netted his first hat-trick. This meant he had scored 10 goals in his first 13 appearance.

Maissen spent seven years with the club and was part of the title winning sides of 1977 and 1980, before joining rivals FC Zürich in 1982. He had an unsuccessful time at Zürich, though, and returned to FC Basel a season later. Maissen scored three hat-tricks during his career, but these were during the test games. In the Swiss Cup match on 20 September 1986 against Köniz Maissen scored four goals. In the domestic league play-off match on 30 June 1987 he also scored four goals as Basel won 1–0 against Wettingen.

When Basel were relegated to the Nationalliga B in 1987 Maissen left the club and joined Young Boys. But after two seasons with the Young Boys he returned to Basel, who were still playing in the second tier of Swiss football. He played two seasons in the Nationalliga B and at the end of the 1990–91 season Maissen retired from his professional career and re-joined his club of origin FC Reinach.

Between the years 1975 to 1982, 1983 to 1987 and again from 1989 to 1991 Maissen played a total of 551 games for Basel scoring a total of 222 goals. 338 of these games were in the domestic league, Nationalliga A or Nationalliga B, 33 in the Swiss Cup, 15 in the Swiss League Cup, 20 in the European competitions (European Cup, UEFA cup, Cup of the Alps) and 145 were friendly games. He scored 116 goal in the domestic league, 23 in the two national cup competitions, four in the European competitions and the other 79 were scored during the test games.

He made his international debut in Switzerland's 2–0 win over Czechoslovakia in Basel on 26 March 1980. After 29 caps his last game for Switzerland was in a 1–0 defeat against West Germany in Kaiserslautern on 27 April 1988.

== Honours ==
Basel

- Swiss Super League: 1976–77, 1979–80

== Sources ==
- Rotblau: Jahrbuch Saison 2017/2018. Publisher: FC Basel Marketing AG. ISBN 978-3-7245-2189-1
- Die ersten 125 Jahre. Publisher: Josef Zindel im Friedrich Reinhardt Verlag, Basel. ISBN 978-3-7245-2305-5
- Verein "Basler Fussballarchiv" Homepage
