= 1979–80 Nationalliga A =

Swiss football season

Nationalliga A
- Season: 1979–80
- Champions: Basel
- Relegated: La Chaux-de-Fonds; Lugano
- European Cup: Basel
- Cup Winners' Cup: Sion
- UEFA Cup: Grasshopper Club; Servette
- Top goalscorer: Claudio Sulser (GC) 25 goals

Nationalliga B
- Season: 1979–80
- Champions: Bellinzona
- Promoted: Bellinzona; Nordstern
- Relegated: FC Raron; FC Baden
- Top goalscorer: Roger Ries (Nordstern) 17 goals

This is the summary of the Swiss National League in the 1979–80 football season, both Nationalliga A and Nationalliga B. This was the 83rd season of top-tier and the 82nd season of second-tier football in Switzerland.

== Overview ==
The Swiss Football Association (ASF/SFV) had 28 members at this time. The clubs were divided into two tiers, both tiers with of 14 teams each, the top tier Nationalliga A (NLA) had been increased by two and the second tier Nationalliga B (NLB) decreased by two. The format in both divisions was that the teams played a double round-robin to decide their table positions. Each club playing every other club twice (home and away) for a total of 26 rounds. Two points were awarded for a win and one point was awarded for a draw. The top placed six teams then played a championship stage. For all others teams the season was complete. In the championship group the teams played another double round-robin and each team took half of the points gained in the first stage, rounded up to complete units, as bonus with them.

The Swiss champions would qualify for the 1980–81 European Cup, the runners-up and third placed team would qualify for the 1980–81 UEFA Cup. The last two teams of the NLA were relegated to the second-tier. The top two teams in the NLB were promoted to top-level. The bottom two teams were relegated to the 1980–81 1. Liga.

== Nationalliga A ==
The first round of the NLA was played on 11 August 1979. There was a winter break between 2 December and 2 March 1980. The season was completed on 20 May and the championship group on 30 June 1980.

=== Teams, locations ===
| Team | Town | Canton | Stadium | Capacity |
|---|---|---|---|---|
| FC Basel | Basel | Basel-Stadt | St. Jakob Stadium | 36,800 |
| CS Chênois | Thônex | Geneva | Stade des Trois-Chêne | 8,000 |
| FC Chiasso | Chiasso | Ticino | Stadio Comunale Riva IV | 4,000 |
| Grasshopper Club Zürich | Zürich | Zürich | Hardturm | 20,000 |
| FC La Chaux-de-Fonds | La Chaux-de-Fonds | Neuchâtel | Centre Sportif de la Charrière | 12,700 |
| FC Lausanne-Sport | Lausanne | Vaud | Pontaise | 15,700 |
| FC Luzern | Lucerne | Lucerne | Stadion Allmend | 25,000 |
| FC Lugano | Lugano | Ticino | Cornaredo Stadium | 6,330 |
| Neuchâtel Xamax FC | Neuchâtel | Neuchâtel | Stade de la Maladière | 25,500 |
| FC St. Gallen | St. Gallen | St. Gallen | Espenmoos | 11,000 |
| Servette FC | Geneva | Geneva | Stade des Charmilles | 27,000 |
| FC Sion | Sion | Valais | Stade de Tourbillon | 16,000 |
| BSC Young Boys | Bern | Bern | Wankdorf Stadium | 56,000 |
| FC Zürich | Zürich | Zürich | Letzigrund | 25,000 |

=== Qualifying phase table ===
| Pos | Team | Pld | W | D | L | GF | GA | GD | Pts | Qualification |
|---|---|---|---|---|---|---|---|---|---|---|
| 1 | Servette | 26 | 16 | 7 | 3 | 61 | 25 | +36 | 39 | Advance to championship round halved points (rounded up) as bonus |
| 2 | Basel | 26 | 15 | 7 | 4 | 67 | 27 | +40 | 37 | Advance to championship round halved points (rounded up) as bonus |
| 3 | Grasshopper Club | 26 | 14 | 8 | 4 | 61 | 21 | +40 | 36 | Advance to championship round halved points (rounded up) as bonus |
| 4 | Luzern | 26 | 14 | 4 | 8 | 44 | 44 | 0 | 32 | Advance to championship round halved points (rounded up) as bonus |
| 5 | Zürich | 26 | 13 | 5 | 8 | 56 | 42 | +14 | 31 | Advance to championship round halved points (rounded up) as bonus |
| 6 | Sion | 26 | 11 | 9 | 6 | 47 | 37 | +10 | 31 | Advance to championship round halved points (rounded up) as bonus |
| 7 | St. Gallen | 26 | 11 | 6 | 9 | 48 | 37 | +11 | 28 | entered 1980 Intertoto Cup |
| 8 | Chiasso | 26 | 6 | 11 | 9 | 27 | 43 | −16 | 23 | |
| 9 | Lausanne-Sport | 26 | 8 | 6 | 12 | 35 | 38 | −3 | 22 | |
| 10 | Young Boys | 26 | 8 | 5 | 13 | 34 | 49 | −15 | 21 | entered 1980 Intertoto Cup |
| 11 | Chênois | 26 | 4 | 12 | 10 | 32 | 45 | −13 | 20 | |
| 12 | Xamax | 26 | 8 | 4 | 14 | 33 | 48 | −15 | 20 | entered 1980 Intertoto Cup |
| 13 | La Chaux-de-Fonds | 26 | 5 | 7 | 14 | 24 | 57 | −33 | 17 | Relegated to 1980–81 Nationalliga B |
| 14 | Lugano | 26 | 1 | 5 | 20 | 18 | 74 | −56 | 7 | Relegated to 1980–81 Nationalliga B |

Source: rsssf.com
Rules for classification: 1) Points; 2) Goal difference; 3) Goals scored;

=== Results ===
| Home \ Away | BAS | CDF | CHÊ | CHI | GCZ | LS | LUG | LUZ | NX | SER | SIO | STG | YB | ZÜR |
|---|---|---|---|---|---|---|---|---|---|---|---|---|---|---|
| Basel | | 6–0 | 0–0 | 6–1 | 2–0 | 3–1 | 7–0 | 8–2 | 6–1 | 0–1 | 2–1 | 1–1 | 4–1 | 3–1 |
| La Chaux-de-Fonds | 1–1 | | 2–2 | 0–0 | 1–0 | 3–1 | 2–0 | 0–1 | 4–1 | 0–5 | 1–2 | 1–2 | 0–0 | 0–0 |
| Chênois | 1–1 | 4–2 | | 0–0 | 1–1 | 2–2 | 3–1 | 3–0 | 0–2 | 2–2 | 2–2 | 3–0 | 2–2 | 2–4 |
| Chiasso | 1–1 | 2–1 | 2–1 | | 1–1 | 1–0 | 3–3 | 2–3 | 0–0 | 0–0 | 0–0 | 3–0 | 2–1 | 1–0 |
| Grasshopper Club | 4–1 | 5–0 | 5–0 | 6–2 | | 4–0 | 4–0 | 5–0 | 2–0 | 2–1 | 0–0 | 3–0 | 1–1 | 0–0 |
| Lausanne-Sports | 0–3 | 5–1 | 4–0 | 1–1 | 1–1 | | 2–1 | 1–3 | 1–1 | 0–0 | 0–2 | 0–0 | 3–1 | 3–0 |
| Lugano | 2–5 | 0–0 | 1–0 | 0–0 | 0–2 | 0–1 | | 1–4 | 2–5 | 0–1 | 0–4 | 2–2 | 1–3 | 0–2 |
| Luzern | 2–0 | 2–0 | 2–0 | 2–0 | 1–1 | 2–1 | 2–1 | | 1–0 | 1–1 | 2–2 | 2–1 | 3–1 | 2–1 |
| Neuchâtel Xamax | 0–1 | 4–0 | 3–1 | 1–0 | 0–3 | 0–1 | 2–0 | 1–1 | | 1–2 | 2–1 | 1–0 | 0–1 | 2–3 |
| Servette | 0–0 | 4–0 | 4–1 | 2–1 | 4–2 | 3–1 | 8–0 | 3–2 | 6–0 | | 2–3 | 4–1 | 1–0 | 0–4 |
| Sion | 1–2 | 1–1 | 2–1 | 4–0 | 2–1 | 0–3 | 1–1 | 3–1 | 2–2 | 1–1 | | 2–2 | 3–1 | 3–2 |
| St. Gallen | 3–0 | 6–0 | 1–1 | 2–1 | 1–4 | 1–0 | 4–0 | 2–1 | 3–0 | 1–1 | 4–0 | | 2–3 | 4–0 |
| Young Boys | 1–3 | 0–3 | 0–0 | 1–1 | 0–2 | 2–1 | 2–1 | 3–1 | 3–2 | 1–2 | 0–3 | 4–2 | | 1–2 |
| Zürich | 1–1 | 3–1 | 0–0 | 7–2 | 2–2 | 3–2 | 5–1 | 3–1 | 4–2 | 1–3 | 4–2 | 0–3 | 4–1 | |

Source: rsssf.com
Legend: Blue = home team win; Yellow = draw; Red = away team win.

=== Championship table ===
| Pos | Team | Pld | W | D | L | GF | GA | GD | BP | Pts | Qualification |
|---|---|---|---|---|---|---|---|---|---|---|---|
| 1 | Basel | 10 | 6 | 2 | 2 | 24 | 11 | +13 | 19 | 33 | Champions, qualified for 1980–81 European Cup |
| 2 | Grasshopper Club | 10 | 5 | 3 | 2 | 21 | 11 | +10 | 18 | 31 | qualified for 1980–81 UEFA Cup |
| 3 | Servette | 10 | 5 | 1 | 4 | 18 | 11 | +7 | 20 | 31 | qualified for 1980–81 UEFA Cup |
| 4 | Zürich | 10 | 5 | 1 | 4 | 17 | 15 | +2 | 16 | 27 | |
| 5 | Sion | 10 | 4 | 2 | 4 | 22 | 20 | +2 | 16 | 26 | Swiss Cup winners, qualified for 1980–81 Cup Winners' Cup and entered 1980 Intertoto Cup |
| 6 | Luzern | 10 | 0 | 1 | 9 | 4 | 38 | −34 | 16 | 17 | |

Source: rsssf.com
Rules for classification: 1) Points; 2) Goal difference; 3) Goals scored;

=== Results ===
| Home \ Away | BAS | GCZ | LUZ | SER | SIO | ZÜR |
|---|---|---|---|---|---|---|
| Basel | | 0–0 | 5–0 | 2–0 | 3–2 | 2–0 |
| Grasshopper Club | 3–1 | | 8–0 | 2–1 | 2–2 | 0–1 |
| Luzern | 0–4 | 0–1 | | 0–2 | 3–5 | 0–2 |
| Servette | 2–1 | 1–1 | 6–0 | | 2–0 | 3–0 |
| Sion | 2–2 | 0–3 | 4–0 | 3–1 | | 3–2 |
| Zürich | 2–4 | 5–1 | 1–1 | 2–0 | 2–1 | |

Source: rsssf.com
Legend: Blue = home team win; Yellow = draw; Red = away team win.

== Nationalliga B ==
=== Teams, locations ===
| Team | Town | Canton | Stadium | Capacity |
|---|---|---|---|---|
| FC Aarau | Aarau | Aargau | Stadion Brügglifeld | 9,240 |
| FC Baden | Baden | Aargau | Esp Stadium | 7,000 |
| AC Bellinzona | Bellinzona | Ticino | Stadio Comunale Bellinzona | 5,000 |
| FC Bern | Bern | Bern | Stadion Neufeld | 14,000 |
| FC Biel-Bienne | Biel/Bienne | Bern | Stadion Gurzelen | 15,000 |
| FC Frauenfeld | Frauenfeld | Thurgau | Kleine Allmend | 6,370 |
| FC Fribourg | Fribourg | Fribourg | Stade Universitaire | 9,000 |
| FC Grenchen | Grenchen | Solothurn | Stadium Brühl | 15,100 |
| SC Kriens | Kriens | Lucerne | Stadion Kleinfeld | 5,100 |
| FC Nordstern Basel | Basel | Basel-Stadt | Rankhof | 7,600 |
| FC Raron | Raron | Valais | Sportplatz Rhoneglut | 1,000 |
| Vevey-Sports | Vevey | Vaud | Stade de Copet | 4,000 |
| FC Wettingen | Wettingen | Aargau | Stadion Altenburg | 10,000 |
| FC Winterthur | Winterthur | Zürich | Schützenwiese | 8,550 |

=== Final league table ===
| Pos | Team | Pld | W | D | L | GF | GA | GD | Pts | Qualification |
|---|---|---|---|---|---|---|---|---|---|---|
| 1 | AC Bellinzona | 26 | 12 | 14 | 0 | 37 | 14 | +23 | 38 | NLB Champions promoted to 1980–81 Nationalliga A |
| 2 | FC Nordstern Basel | 26 | 15 | 7 | 4 | 63 | 32 | +31 | 37 | Promoted to 1980–81 Nationalliga A |
| 3 | FC Winterthur | 26 | 13 | 7 | 6 | 46 | 32 | +14 | 33 | |
| 4 | Vevey-Sports | 26 | 12 | 7 | 7 | 46 | 27 | +19 | 31 | |
| 5 | FC Fribourg | 26 | 11 | 7 | 8 | 30 | 24 | +6 | 29 | |
| 6 | FC Bern | 26 | 11 | 7 | 8 | 44 | 41 | +3 | 29 | |
| 7 | FC Frauenfeld | 26 | 9 | 10 | 7 | 30 | 26 | +4 | 28 | |
| 8 | FC Grenchen | 26 | 9 | 8 | 9 | 38 | 40 | −2 | 26 | |
| 9 | FC Aarau | 26 | 8 | 8 | 10 | 43 | 52 | −9 | 24 | |
| 10 | FC Biel-Bienne | 26 | 6 | 11 | 9 | 24 | 29 | −5 | 23 | |
| 11 | FC Wettingen | 26 | 6 | 8 | 12 | 47 | 46 | +1 | 20 | |
| 12 | SC Kriens | 26 | 6 | 6 | 14 | 29 | 51 | −22 | 18 | |
| 13 | FC Raron | 26 | 5 | 5 | 16 | 21 | 47 | −26 | 15 | Relegated to 1980–81 1. Liga |
| 14 | FC Baden | 26 | 5 | 3 | 18 | 29 | 66 | −37 | 13 | Relegated to 1980–81 1. Liga |

Source: rsssf.com
Rules for classification: 1) Points; 2) Goal difference; 3) Goals scored;

== Further in Swiss football ==
- 1979–80 Swiss Cup
- 1979–80 Swiss 1. Liga

== Sources ==
- Switzerland 1979–80 at RSSSF

| Preceded by 1978–79 | Nationalliga seasons in Switzerland | Succeeded by 1980–81 |
