= 1977–78 in Swiss football =

Football in Switzerland
- Season: 1977–78

Men's football
- Nationalliga A: Grasshopper Club
- Nationalliga B: Nordstern Basel
- 1. Liga: 1. Liga champions: FC Frauenfeld; Group 1: FC Stade Lausanne; Group 2: FC Bern; Group 3: FC Frauenfeld; Group 4: Mendrisiostar
- Swiss Cup: Servette
- Swiss League Cup: St. Gallen

Women's football
- Swiss Women's Super League: DFC Bern
- Swiss Cup: DFC Bern

The following is a summary of the 1977–78 season of competitive football in Switzerland.

== Nationalliga A ==
=== Qualifying phase table ===
Pos	Team	Pld	W	D	L	GF	GA	GD	Pts	Qualification
1	Grasshopper Club	22	15	4	3	60	27	+33	34	To championship round
2	Servette	22	14	5	3	44	20	+24	33	To championship round
3	Lausanne-Sport	22	13	4	5	47	21	+26	30	To championship round
4	Basel	22	12	4	6	53	34	+19	28	To championship round
5	FC Zürich	22	11	6	5	38	27	+11	28	To championship round
6	Sion	22	6	9	7	29	33	−4	21	To championship round
7	Xamax	22	8	3	11	32	42	−10	19	To relegation play-out round
8	Young Boys	22	7	5	10	27	45	−18	19	To relegation play-out round
9	Chênois	22	8	2	12	27	35	−8	18	To relegation play-out round
10	St. Gallen	22	5	7	10	27	38	−11	17	To relegation play-out round
11	Étoile Carouge	22	5	3	14	22	40	−18	13	To relegation play-out round
12	Young Fellows Zürich	22	1	2	19	14	58	−44	4	To relegation play-out round

Source: rsssf.com
Rules for classification: 1) Points; 2) Goal difference; 3) Goals scored;

=== Championship table ===
Pos	Team	Pld	W	D	L	GF	GA	GD	BP	Pts	Qualification
1	Grasshopper Club	10	4	4	2	17	12	+5	17	29	Swiss Champions, qualified for 1978–79 European Cup and entered 1978 Intertoto Cup
2	Servette	10	3	5	2	10	10	0	17	28	Swiss Cup winners, qualified for 1978–79 Cup Winners' Cup
3	Basel	10	5	3	2	21	14	+7	14	27	qualified for 1978–79 UEFA Cup
4	Lausanne-Sport	10	4	3	3	21	14	+7	15	26	qualified for 1978–79 UEFA Cup
5	Zürich	10	5	2	3	15	15	0	14	26	entered 1978 Intertoto Cup
6	Sion	10	0	1	9	8	27	−19	11	12	entered 1978 Intertoto Cup

Source: rsssf.com
Rules for classification: 1) Points; 2) Goal difference; 3) Goals scored;

=== Relegation play-out ===
Pos	Team	Pld	W	D	L	GF	GA	GD	BP	Pts	Qualification or relegation
1	Young Boys	10	4	5	1	20	13	+7	10	23	entered 1978 Intertoto Cup
2	Chênois	10	4	4	2	19	9	+10	9	21	
3	St. Gallen	10	3	6	1	11	7	+4	9	21	
4	Xamax	10	4	2	4	14	15	−1	10	20	
5	Étoile Carouge	10	4	3	3	13	12	+1	7	18	Relegated to 1978–79 Nationalliga B
6	Young Fellows Zürich	10	1	0	9	10	31	−21	2	4	Relegated to 1978–79 Nationalliga B

Source: rsssf.com
Rules for classification: 1) Points; 2) Goal difference; 3) Goals scored;

== Nationalliga B ==
=== Final league table ===
Pos	Team	Pld	W	D	L	GF	GA	GD	Pts	Relegation
1	Nordstern Basel	30	18	9	3	69	23	+46	45	Champions promoted to 1978–79 Nationalliga A
2	Chiasso	30	18	9	3	70	30	+40	45	Promoted to 1978–79 Nationalliga A
3	Lugano	30	16	10	4	57	19	+38	42	
4	Biel-Bienne	30	15	6	9	37	30	+7	36	
5	Vevey-Sports	30	13	9	8	58	36	+22	35	
6	Winterthur	30	11	10	9	44	44	0	32	
7	Grenchen	30	10	8	12	45	45	0	28	
8	Kriens	30	11	6	13	38	58	−20	28	
9	Bellinzona	30	9	8	13	44	55	−11	26	
10	Fribourg	30	9	8	13	35	46	−11	26	
11	Aarau	30	11	4	15	44	67	−23	26	
12	Luzern	30	7	11	12	34	39	−5	25	
13	Wettingen	30	9	7	14	36	48	−12	25	
14	La Chaux-de-Fonds	30	7	9	14	44	56	−12	23	
15	Gossau	30	6	8	16	36	64	−28	20	Relegated to 1978–79 1. Liga
16	Bulle	30	6	6	18	37	68	−31	18	Relegated to 1978–79 1. Liga

Source: rsssf.com
Rules for classification: 1) Points; 2) Goal difference within the league, but decider play-off for qualifiers; 3) Goals scored;

== 1. Liga ==
=== Group 1 ===
Pos	Team	Pld	W	D	L	GF	GA	GD	Pts	Qualification or relegation
1	FC Stade Lausanne	26	16	6	4	70	28	+42	38	Play-off to Nationalliga B
2	FC Orbe	26	14	2	10	54	48	+6	30	Play-off to Nationalliga B
3	FC Raron	26	10	9	7	50	32	+18	29	
4	ES FC Malley	26	11	7	8	50	38	+12	29	
5	FC Martigny-Sports	26	11	5	10	39	41	−2	27	
6	FC Leytron	26	10	6	10	44	42	+2	26	
7	FC Renens	26	10	6	10	35	37	−2	26	
8	Central Fribourg	26	12	2	12	39	47	−8	26	
9	FC Stade Nyonnais	26	10	6	10	34	43	−9	26	
10	FC Meyrin	26	10	4	12	40	40	0	24	
11	FC Fétigny	26	8	8	10	37	43	−6	24	
12	FC Monthey	26	8	7	11	38	41	−3	23	Play-out against relegation
13	FC Onex	26	7	9	10	36	46	−10	23	Play-out against relegation
14	Concordia Lausanne	26	3	7	16	29	69	−40	13	Relegation to 2. Liga Interregional

Source: RSSSF
Rules for classification: 1) Points; 2) Goal difference within the league, but decider play-off for qualifier/relegation positions.

==== Decider for twelfth place ====
The decider was played on 4 June in Morges.

Team 1	Score	Team 2
FC Monthey	2–2	FC Onex

The game was drawn, however, at this time, extra-time in matches had not yet been introduced. FC Monthey were declared winners due to goal-average of the regular season. Therefore, they remained in the division and FC Onex were relegated to 2. Liga Interregional.

=== Group 2 ===
Pos	Team	Pld	W	D	L	GF	GA	GD	Pts	Qualification or relegation
1	FC Bern	26	15	8	3	55	26	+29	38	Play-off to Nationalliga B
2	FC Köniz	26	11	12	3	31	17	+14	34	Play-off to Nationalliga B
3	FC Lerchenfeld	26	11	10	5	46	32	+14	32	
4	SC Derendingen	26	9	14	3	30	22	+8	32	
5	FC Boudry	26	12	7	7	49	34	+15	31	
6	FC Solothurn	26	10	9	7	48	41	+7	29	
7	SR Delémont	26	10	7	9	37	30	+7	27	
8	US Boncourt	26	5	16	5	29	29	0	26	
9	FC Dürrenast	26	8	9	9	40	41	−1	25	
10	FC Le Locle	26	7	9	10	32	44	−12	23	
11	FC Aurore Bienne	26	5	10	11	26	43	−17	20	
12	ASI Audax-Friul	26	5	9	12	40	49	−9	19	Play-out against relegation
13	FC Herzogenbuchsee	26	6	7	13	34	48	−14	19	Play-out against relegation
14	FC Bettlach	24	2	3	19	27	68	−41	7	Relegation to 2. Liga Interregional

Source: RSSSF
Rules for classification: 1) Points; 2) Goal difference within the league, but decider play-off for qualifier/relegation positions.

==== Decider for twelfth place ====
The decider was played on in .

Team 1	Score	Team 2
FC Herzogenbuchsee	2–1	ASI Audax-Friul

FC Herzogenbuchsee won and remained in the division. ASI Audax-Friul were relegated to 2. Liga Interregional.

=== Group 3 ===
Pos	Team	Pld	W	D	L	GF	GA	GD	Pts	Qualification or relegation
1	FC Frauenfeld	26	13	9	4	53	27	+26	35	Play-off to Nationalliga B
2	FC Laufen	26	11	8	7	55	41	+14	30	To decider for second place
3	FC Unterstrass	26	13	4	9	55	43	+12	30	To decider for second place
4	FC Schaffhausen	26	11	7	8	51	45	+6	29	
5	FC Birsfelden	26	11	6	9	37	42	−5	28	
6	SC Brühl	26	9	9	8	43	43	0	27	
7	FC Blue Stars Zürich	26	9	8	9	48	51	−3	26	
8	FC Baden	26	9	8	9	45	48	−3	26	
9	FC Concordia Basel	26	9	7	10	57	50	+7	25	
10	FC Glattbrugg	26	9	7	10	46	51	−5	25	
11	SV Muttenz	26	9	6	11	46	46	0	24	
12	FC Red Star Zürich	26	10	4	12	47	49	−2	24	Play-out against relegation
13	FC Uzwil	26	11	2	13	47	55	−8	24	Play-out against relegation
14	FC Turg	26	4	3	19	29	68	−39	11	Relegation to 2. Liga Interregional

Source: RSSSF
Rules for classification: 1) Points; 2) Goal difference within the league, but decider play-off for qualifier or relegation.

==== Decider for second place ====
The decider match for second place was played on 4 June in Olten.

Team 1	Score	Team 2
FC Laufen	3–2	FC Unterstrass

FC Laufen win and advance to play-offs. FC Unterstrass remain in the division.

==== Decider for twelfth place ====
The decider was played on 4 June in Amriswil.

Team 1	Score	Team 2
FC Red Star Zürich	4–0	FC Uzwil

FC Red Star Zürich win and remain in the division. FC Uzwil are relegated to 2. Liga Interregional.

=== Group 4 ===
Pos	Team	Pld	W	D	L	GF	GA	GD	Pts	Qualification or relegation
1	Mendrisiostar	26	15	8	3	46	21	+25	38	Play-off to Nationalliga B
2	SC Zug	26	14	8	4	56	28	+28	36	Play-off to Nationalliga B
3	FC Ibach	26	15	5	6	43	27	+16	35	
4	FC Locarno	26	11	8	7	44	33	+11	30	
5	FC Turicum	26	8	13	5	28	23	+5	29	
6	FC Balzers	26	10	6	10	57	49	+8	26	
7	FC Emmen	26	9	6	11	41	42	−1	24	
8	US Giubiasco	26	7	9	10	26	41	−15	23	
9	FC Morbio	26	7	9	10	30	49	−19	23	
10	FC Chur	26	5	12	9	34	43	−9	22	
11	FC Zug	26	7	7	12	49	47	+2	21	
12	FC Stäfa	26	7	7	12	28	37	−9	21	
13	SC Buochs	26	5	10	11	19	30	−11	20	Relegation to 2. Liga Interregional
14	FC Brunnen	26	6	4	16	25	56	−31	16	Relegation to 2. Liga Interregional

Source: RSSSF
Rules for classification: 1) Points; 2) Goal difference within the league, but decider play-off for qualifiers.

=== Promotion play-off ===
==== Qualification round ====
Team 1	Score	Team 2
FC Bern	0–1	SC Zug
SC Zug	2–3	FC Bern

FC Bern win on away goals and continue to the finals.

Team 1	Score	Team 2
Mendrisiostar	1–0	FC Orbe
FC Orbe	0–3	Mendrisiostar

Mendrisiostar win 4–0 on aggregate and continue to the finals.

Team 1	Score	Team 2
FC Stade Lausanne	3–1	FC Laufen
FC Laufen	3–0	FC Stade Lausanne

FC Laufen win 4–3 on aggregate and continue to the finals.

Team 1	Score	Team 2
FC Frauenfeld	2–1	FC Köniz
FC Köniz	0–1	FC Frauenfeld

FC Frauenfeld win 3–1 on aggregate and continue to the finals.

==== Final round ====
Team 1	Score	Team 2
Mendrisiostar	2–1	FC Frauenfeld
FC Frauenfeld	2–0	Mendrisiostar

FC Frauenfeld win 3–2 on aggregate and are promoted to 1978–79 Nationalliga B.

Team 1	Score	Team 2
FC Laufen	0–1	FC Bern
FC Bern	0–1	FC Laufen

1–1 on aggregate. The replay was on 27 June in Grenchen.

Team 1	Score	Team 2
FC Bern	1–0	FC Laufen

FC Bern win and are promoted to 1978–79 Nationalliga B.

==== Decider for 1. Liga championship ====
The final for the 1. Liga championship was played on 2 July in Frauenfeld.

Team 1	Score	Team 2
FC Frauenfeld	0–1	FC Bern

FC Bern win and are 1. Liga champions.

== Swiss Cup ==
The competition was played in a knockout system. In the case of a draw, extra time was played. If the teams were still level at the end of extra time, the match was replayed on the away team's pitch. The Cup-final was held in Bern.

=== Early rounds ===
The routes of the finalists to the final were:

- Third round: NLA teams with bye
- Fourth round: Stade Nyonnais-Servette 1:12. Laufen-GC 0:4.
- Fifth round: Lausanne-Servette 1:2 (a.e.t.). Zug-GC 0:7.
- Quarter-finals: La Chaux-de-Fonds-Servette 0:2. GC-Bulle 2:0.
- Semi-finals: Chiasso-Servette 0:1. GC-Basel 5:1.

=== Final ===
Whit Monday 15 May 1978
15:00
Final

Servette	2–2 (a.e.t.)	Grasshopper Club
Peterhans 7'; Barberis 65'	Report	60' Ponte; 63' Elsener

Wankdorf Stadium, Bern
Attendance: 33,000
Referee: (Switzerland) Walter Hungerbühler (St. Gallen)

4 June 1978
15:00
Replay

Servette	1–0	Grasshopper Club
Thouvenel 17'	Report

Wankdorf Stadium, Bern
Attendance: 18,000
Referee: (Switzerland) Ernst Dörflinger (Basel)

== Swiss League Cup ==
=== Early rounds ===
The routes of the finalists to the final were:

- Round 1: Lugano-St.Gallen 0:2. Frauenfeld-Grasshopper Club 0:7.
- Round 2: Winterthur-FC St.Gallen 1:1 (a.e.t.), (9–6 p). Nordstern Basel-Grasshoppers-Club 0:2.
- Quarter-finals: Sion-FC St.Gallen 1:2 (a.e.t.). Grasshopper Club-FC La Chaux-de-Fonds 8:0.
- Semi-finals: Basel-St.Gallen 1:1 (a.e.t.), (4–5 p). Grasshopper Club-FC Zürich 5:1.

=== Final ===
15 August 1978
Final

St. Gallen	3–2	Grasshopper Club
Labhart 6'; Labhart 30'; Müller 80'	Summary	19' Nafzger; 61' Wehrli

Schützenwiese, Winterthur
Attendance: 3,500
Referee: (Switzerland) Bruno Della Bruna (Lumino)

== Swiss Clubs in Europe ==
- Basel] as 1976–77 Nationalliga A champions: 1977–78 European Cup
- Young Boys as Swiss Cup winners: 1977–78 Cup Winners' Cup and entered 1977 Intertoto Cup
- Servette as league runners-up: 1977–78 UEFA Cup
- Zürich as league third placed team: 1977–78 UEFA Cup and entered 1977 Intertoto Cup
- Grasshopper Club as league third placed team: 1977–78 UEFA Cup and entered 1977 Intertoto Cup
- Chênois: entered 1977 Intertoto Cup

=== Basel ===
==== European Cup ====
===== First round =====
14 September 1977 First leg	Basel (Switzerland)	1–3	(Austria) Wacker	St. Jakob Stadium, Basel
20:00	von Wartburg 22' (1:0)	Report; FCB Summary	41' (1:1) Welzl; 45' (pen. 1:2) Welzl; 51' (1:3) Constantini	Attendance: 18,000; Referee: (Netherlands) Achille Verbecke
Note: Four Austrian spectators were taken away by the police because they disrupted the match with a referee's whistle. Fair game, no yellow cards.

28 September 1977 Return leg	Wacker (Austria)	0–1 (3–2 agg.)	(Switzerland) Basel	Stadion Lehen, Salzburg
19:00		Report; FCB Summary	62' (0:1) Maissen	Attendance: 15,000; Referee: (East Germany) Adolf Prokop
Note: Fair game, no yellow cards.

Wacker won 3–2 on aggregate.

=== Young Boys ===
==== Cup Winners' Cup ====
===== Qualifying match =====
17 August 1977 First leg	Rangers (Scotland)	1–0	(Switzerland) Young Boys	Ibrox Park, Glasgow
	Greig	Summary		Attendance: 30,000

31 August 1977 Second leg	Young Boys (Switzerland)	2–2	(Scotland) Rangers	Wankdorf Stadium, Bern
	Johnstone (o.g.); Leuzinger	Summary	Johnstone; Smith	Attendance: 21,000

Rangers won 3–2 on aggregate.

==== Intertoto Cup ====
===== Group 5 =====
Pos	Team	Pld	W	D	L	GF	GA	GD	Pts	SLA	LEG	YB	LAN
1	(Czechoslovakia) Slavia Prague	6	4	2	0	23	8	+15	10	—	1–1	5–0	6–1
2	(Poland) Legia Warsaw	6	3	3	0	11	6	+5	9	2–2	—	4–1	1–0
3	(Switzerland) Young Boys	6	1	1	4	8	16	−8	3	1–4	1–1	—	4–0
4	(Sweden) Landskrona	6	1	0	5	7	19	−12	2	3–5	1–2	2–1	—

Source: mogiel.net
Rules for classification: 1) Points; 2) Goal difference; 3) Goals scored; 4) Head-to-head points; 5) Away goals scored; 6) Draw.

=== Servette ===
==== UEFA Cup ====
===== First round =====
14 September 1977 First leg	Servette (Switzerland)	1–0	(Spain) Athletic Bilbao	Charmilles Stadium, Geneva
	Barberis 26'	Report		Attendance: 18,500; Referee: Heinz Aldinger (West Germany)

28 September 1977 Second leg	Athletic Bilbao (Spain)	2–0	(Switzerland) Servette	San Mamés Stadium, Bilbao
	Dani 58'; Amorrortu 70'	Report		Attendance: 20,000; Referee: Hugh Alexander (Scotland)

Athletic Bilbao won 2–1 on aggregate.

=== Zürich ===
==== UEFA Cup ====
===== First round =====
14 September 1977 First leg	Zürich (Switzerland)	1–0	(Bulgaria) CSKA Sofia	Letzigrund, Zürich
	Risi 4'	Report		Attendance: 8,500; Referee: László Pádár (Hungary)

28 September 1977 Second leg	CSKA Sofia (Bulgaria)	1–1 (a.e.t.)	(Switzerland) Zürich	Stadion Balgarska Armia, Sofia
	Markov 32'	Report	Cucinotta 105'	Attendance: 20,000; Referee: Adolf Mathias (Austria)

Zürich won 2–1 on aggregate.

===== Second round =====
19 October 1977 First leg	Zürich (Switzerland)	0–3	(West Germany) Eintracht Frankfurt	Letzigrund, Zürich
		Report	Hölzenbein 28'; Wenzel 77'; Grabowski 90'	Attendance: 17,000; Referee: Vojtech Christov (Czechoslovakia)

2 November 1977 Second leg	Eintracht Frankfurt (West Germany)	4–3	(Switzerland) Zürich	Waldstadion, Frankfurt
	Kraus 1'; Grabowski 62'; Stepanović 68'; Krobbach 87'	Report	Risi 45' (pen.), 60'; Torstensson 78'	Attendance: 3,600; Referee: Anatoli Ivanov (Soviet Union)

Eintracht Frankfurt won 7–3 on aggregate.

==== Intertoto Cup ====
===== Group 3 =====
Pos	Team	Pld	W	D	L	GF	GA	GD	Pts	BRA	EIN	WAC	ZÜR
1	(Czechoslovakia) Inter Bratislava	6	4	1	1	18	11	+7	9	—	2–5	4–2	5–0
2	(West Germany) Eintracht Frankfurt	6	2	3	1	13	8	+5	7	2–2	—	1–1	4–1
3	(Austria) SSW Innsbruck	6	2	2	2	10	10	0	6	1–3	1–1	—	3–0
4	(Switzerland) Zürich	6	1	0	5	4	16	−12	2	1–2	1–0	1–2	—

Source: mogiel.net
Rules for classification: 1) Points; 2) Goal difference; 3) Goals scored; 4) Head-to-head points; 5) Away goals scored; 6) Draw.

2 July 1977 Matchday 1	Inter Bratislava (Czechoslovakia)	5–0	(Switzerland) Zürich	Bratislava
	(1:0) (2:0) (3:0) (4:0) (5:0)	FCZ summary		Attendance: 2,600

9 July 1977 Matchday 2	Eintracht Frankfurt (West Germany)	4–1	(Switzerland) Zürich	Waldstadion, Frankfurt
	Hölzenbein 26' (1:0); Kraus 65' (2:1); Hölzenbein 80' (3:1); Neuberger 86'	FCZ summary Eintracht summary	57' (1:1) Torstensson	Attendance: 5,500; Referee: (West Germany) Heinz Aldinger (Waiblingen)

16 July 1977 Matchday 3	Zürich (Switzerland)	1–2	(Czechoslovakia) Inter Bratislava	Letzigrund, Zürich
	Cucinotta 11' (pen 1:1)	FCZ summary	3' (0:1) Brezik; 75' (1:2) Ladislav Petráš	Attendance: 2,500; Referee: (Switzerland) Rudolf Renggli (Luzern)

20 July 1977 Matchday 4	Zürich (Switzerland)	1–0	(West Germany) Eintracht Frankfurt	Letzigrund, Zürich
	Cucinotta 10' (1:0)	FCZ summary Eintracht summary		Attendance: 3,500; Referee: (Switzerland) Ernst Dörflinger (Grenchen)

23 July 1977 Matchday 5	SSW Innsbruck (Austria)	3–0	(Switzerland) Zürich	Tivoli, Innsbruck
	Welzl 29' (1:0); Zanon 35' (2:0); Lercher 45' (pen.)	FCZ summary		Attendance: 5,000; Referee: (Austria) Wolfgang Klocker

30 July 1977 Matchday 6	Zürich (Switzerland)	1–2	(Austria) SSW Innsbruck	Letzigrund, Zürich
	Moser 65' (1:2)	FCZ summary	12' (0:1) Oberacher; 52' (0:2) Oberacher	Attendance: 2,800; Referee: (Switzerland) René Kellenberger (Herisau)

=== Grasshopper Club ===
==== UEFA Cup ====
===== First round =====
14 September 1977 First leg	BK Frem (Denmark)	0–2	(Switzerland) Grasshoppers	Valby Idrætspark, Copenhagen
		Report	Elsener 34'; Becker 39'	Attendance: 1,956; Referee: Jan Redelfs (West Germany)

28 September 1977 Second leg	Grasshoppers (Switzerland)	6–1	(Denmark) BK Frem	Hardturm, Zürich
	Meyer 7', 70'; Becker 40'; Elsener 57'; Ponte 82', 83'	Report	Mikkelsen 45'	Attendance: 3,400; Referee: Horst Brummeier (Austria)

Grasshoppers won 8–1 on aggregate.

===== Second round =====
19 October 1977 First leg	Inter Bratislava (Czechoslovakia)	1–0	(Switzerland) Grasshoppers	Tehelné pole, Bratislava
	Bauer 83' (o.g.)	Report		Attendance: 4,600; Referee: William Gow (Wales)

2 November 1977 Second leg	Grasshoppers (Switzerland)	5–1	(Czechoslovakia) Inter Bratislava	Hardturm, Zürich
	Elsener 3', 35'; Ponte 40'; Sulser 60'; Hey 80'	Report	Jurkemik 75'	Attendance: 5,500; Referee: Jan Beck (Netherlands)

Grasshoppers won 5–2 on aggregate.

===== Third round =====
23 November 1977 First leg	Dinamo Tbilisi (Soviet Union)	1–0	(Switzerland) Grasshoppers	Dinamo Stadium, Tbilisi
	Shengelia 20'	Report		Attendance: 75,000; Referee: Rolf Nyhus (Norway)

7 December 1977 Second leg	Grasshoppers (Switzerland)	4–0	(Soviet Union) Dinamo Tbilisi	Hardturm, Zürich
	Sulser 14'; Ponte 46' (pen.), 77'; Elsener 90+1'	Report		Attendance: 17,000; Referee: Michel Kitabdjian (France)

Grasshoppers won 4–1 on aggregate.

===== Quarter-final =====
1 March 1978 First leg	Eintracht Frankfurt (West Germany)	3–2	(Switzerland) Grasshoppers	Waldstadion, Frankfurt
	Kraus 58'; Hölzenbein 68', 90' (pen.)	Report	Bosco 36'; Ponte 52' (pen.)	Attendance: 14,000; Referee: Erich Linemayr (Austria)

14 March 1978 Second leg	Grasshoppers (Switzerland)	1–0	(West Germany) Eintracht Frankfurt	Hardturm, Zürich
	Ponte 33' (pen.)	Report		Attendance: 30,000; Referee: Dušan Maksimović (Yugoslavia)

3–3 on aggregate, Grasshoppers won on away goals rule.

===== Semi-finals =====
29 March 1978 First leg	Grasshoppers (Switzerland)	3–2	(France) Bastia	Hardturm, Zürich
	Hermann 22'; Ponte 31' (pen.); Montandon 54'	Report	Krimau 18'; Papi 37' (pen.)	Attendance: 29,000; Referee: John Carpenter (Republic of Ireland)

12 April 1978 Second leg	Bastia (France)	1–0	(Switzerland) Grasshoppers	Stade Armand-Cesari, Furiani
	Papi 67'	Report		Attendance: 11,000; Referee: Pat Partridge (England)

3–3 on aggregate, Bastia won on away goals rule.

==== Intertoto Cup ====
===== Group 4 =====
Pos	Team	Pld	W	D	L	GF	GA	GD	Pts	SLA	MAL	HAM	GCZ
1	(Bulgaria) Slavia Sofia	6	5	0	1	13	7	+6	10	—	1–0	3–0	2–1
2	(Sweden) Malmö FF	6	3	2	1	12	4	+8	8	3–0	—	5–0	1–0
3	(West Germany) Hamburg	6	2	1	3	11	15	−4	5	2–3	2–2	—	4–1
4	(Switzerland) Grasshopper Club	6	0	1	5	5	15	−10	1	1–4	1–1	1–3	—

Source: mogiel.net
Rules for classification: 1) Points; 2) Goal difference; 3) Goals scored; 4) Head-to-head points; 5) Away goals scored; 6) Draw.

=== Chênois ===
==== Intertoto Cup ====
===== Group 10 =====
Pos	Team	Pld	W	D	L	GF	GA	GD	Pts	PSZ	KB	STU	CHÊ
1	(Poland) Pogoń Szczecin	6	3	3	0	11	4	+7	9	—	2–2	1–0	6–1
2	(Denmark) KB	6	1	4	1	8	10	−2	6	1–1	—	2–1	0–0
3	(Austria) Sturm Graz	6	2	1	3	10	6	+4	5	0–0	5–2	—	4–0
4	(Switzerland) Chênois	6	1	2	3	3	12	−9	4	0–0	1–1	1–0	—

Source: mogiel.net
Rules for classification: 1) Points; 2) Goal difference; 3) Goals scored; 4) Head-to-head points; 5) Away goals scored; 6) Draw.

== Sources ==
- Switzerland 1977–78 at RSSSF
- League Cup finals at RSSSF
- European Competitions 1977–78 at RSSSF.com
- Cup finals at Fussball-Schweiz
- Intertoto history at Pawel Mogielnicki's Page
- Josef Zindel (2018). FC Basel 1893. Die ersten 125 Jahre (in German). Basel: Friedrich Reinhardt Verlag. ISBN 978-3-7245-2305-5.

Preceded by 1976–77	Seasons in Swiss football	Succeeded by 1978–79
