= 1977–78 Swiss 1. Liga =

1. Liga
- Season: 1977–78
- Champions: 1. Liga champions: FC Frauenfeld; Group 1: FC Stade Lausanne; Group 2: FC Bern; Group 3: FC Frauenfeld; Group 4: Mendrisiostar
- Promoted: FC Frauenfeld; FC Bern
- Relegated: Group 1: FC Onex; Concordia Lausanne; Group 2: FC Herzogenbuchsee; FC Bettlach; Group 3: FC Uzwil; FC Turgi; Group 4: SC Buochs; FC Brunnen
- Matches: 4 times 182 and 4 deciders plus 14 play-offs

The 1977–78 1. Liga was the 46th season of this league since its creation in 1931. At this time, the 1. Liga was the third tier of the Swiss football league system and it was the highest level of amateur football.

== Format ==
There were 56 clubs in the 1. Liga. These were divided into four regional groups, each with 14 teams. Within each group, the teams would play a double round-robin to decide their league position. Two points were awarded for a win. The four group winners and the four runners-up contested a play-off round to decide the two promotion slots. The two last placed teams in each group were directly relegated to the 2. Liga (fourth tier).

== Group 1 ==
=== Teams ===
Club	Canton	Stadium	Capacity
FC Central Fribourg	Fribourg	Guintzet	2,000
FC Concordia Lausanne	Vaud	Centre sportif de la Tuilière	1,000
FC Fétigny	Fribourg	Stade Communal Fétigny	500
FC Leytron	Valais	Stade Saint-Martin	1,000
ES FC Malley	Vaud	Centre sportif de la Tuilière	1,500
FC Martigny-Sports	Valais	Stade d'Octodure	2,500
FC Meyrin	Geneva	Stade des Arbères	9,000
FC Monthey	Valais	Stade Philippe Pottier	1,800
FC Onex	Geneva	Stade municipal d'Onex	2,000
FC Orbe	Vaud	Stade du Puisoir	1,000
FC Raron	Valais	Sportplatz Rhoneglut	1,000
FC Renens	Waadt	Zone sportive du Censuy	2,300
FC Stade Lausanne	Vaud	Centre sportif de Vidy	1,000
FC Stade Nyonnais	Vaud	Stade de Colovray	7,200

=== Final league table ===
Pos	Team	Pld	W	D	L	GF	GA	GD	Pts	Qualification or relegation
1	FC Stade Lausanne	26	16	6	4	70	28	+42	38	Play-off to Nationalliga B
2	FC Orbe	26	14	2	10	54	48	+6	30	Play-off to Nationalliga B
3	FC Raron	26	10	9	7	50	32	+18	29	
4	ES FC Malley	26	11	7	8	50	38	+12	29	
5	FC Martigny-Sports	26	11	5	10	39	41	−2	27	
6	FC Leytron	26	10	6	10	44	42	+2	26	
7	FC Renens	26	10	6	10	35	37	−2	26	
8	Central Fribourg	26	12	2	12	39	47	−8	26	
9	FC Stade Nyonnais	26	10	6	10	34	43	−9	26	
10	FC Meyrin	26	10	4	12	40	40	0	24	
11	FC Fétigny	26	8	8	10	37	43	−6	24	
12	FC Monthey	26	8	7	11	38	41	−3	23	Play-out against relegation
13	FC Onex	26	7	9	10	36	46	−10	23	Play-out against relegation
14	Concordia Lausanne	26	3	7	16	29	69	−40	13	Relegation to 2. Liga Interregional

Source: RSSSF
Rules for classification: 1) Points; 2) Goal difference within the league, but decider play-off for qualifier/relegation positions.

=== Decider for twelfth place ===
The decider was played on 4 June in Morges.

Team 1	Score	Team 2
FC Monthey	2–2	FC Onex

The game was drawn, however, at this time, extra-time in matches had not yet been introduced. FC Monthey were declared winners due to goal-average of the regular season. Therefore, they remained in the division and FC Onex were relegated to 2. Liga Interregional.

== Group 2 ==
=== Teams ===
Club	Canton	Stadium	Capacity
ASI Audax-Friul	Neuchâtel	Pierre-à-Bot	1,700
FC Aurore Bienne	Bern	Tilleul-Linde	1,000
FC Bern	Bern	Stadion Neufeld	14,000
FC Bettlach	Solothurn	Neufeld	500
US Boncourt	Jura	Stade Communal Léon Burrus	1,640
FC Boudry	Neuchâtel	Stade des Buchilles	1,500
SR Delémont	Jura	La Blancherie	5,263
SC Derendingen	Solothurn	Heidenegg	1,500
FC Dürrenast	Bern	Stadion Lachen	13,500
FC Herzogenbuchsee	Bern	Waldäcker	1,000
FC Köniz	Bern	Sportplatz Liebefeld-Hessgut	2,600
FC Lerchenfeld	canton of Bern	Sportanlagen Waldeck	2,400
FC Le Locle	Neuchâtel	Installation sportive - Jeanneret	3,142
FC Solothurn	Solothurn	Stadion FC Solothurn	6,750

=== Final league table ===
Pos	Team	Pld	W	D	L	GF	GA	GD	Pts	Qualification or relegation
1	FC Bern	26	15	8	3	55	26	+29	38	Play-off to Nationalliga B
2	FC Köniz	26	11	12	3	31	17	+14	34	Play-off to Nationalliga B
3	FC Lerchenfeld	26	11	10	5	46	32	+14	32	
4	SC Derendingen	26	9	14	3	30	22	+8	32	
5	FC Boudry	26	12	7	7	49	34	+15	31	
6	FC Solothurn	26	10	9	7	48	41	+7	29	
7	SR Delémont	26	10	7	9	37	30	+7	27	
8	US Boncourt	26	5	16	5	29	29	0	26	
9	FC Dürrenast	26	8	9	9	40	41	−1	25	
10	FC Le Locle	26	7	9	10	32	44	−12	23	
11	FC Aurore Bienne	26	5	10	11	26	43	−17	20	
12	ASI Audax-Friul	26	5	9	12	40	49	−9	19	Play-out against relegation
13	FC Herzogenbuchsee	26	6	7	13	34	48	−14	19	Play-out against relegation
14	FC Bettlach	24	2	3	19	27	68	−41	7	Relegation to 2. Liga Interregional

Source: RSSSF
Rules for classification: 1) Points; 2) Goal difference within the league, but decider play-off for qualifier/relegation positions.

=== Decider for twelfth place ===
The decider was played on in .

Team 1	Score	Team 2
FC Herzogenbuchsee	2–1	ASI Audax-Friul

FC Herzogenbuchsee won and remained in the division. ASI Audax-Friul were relegated to 2. Liga Interregional.

== Group 3 ==
=== Teams ===
Club	Canton	Stadium	Capacity
FC Baden	Aargau	Esp Stadium	7,000
FC Birsfelden	Basel-Country	Sternenfeld	9,400
FC Blue Stars Zürich	Zürich	Hardhof	1,000
SC Brühl	St. Gallen	Paul-Grüninger-Stadion	4,200
FC Concordia Basel	Basel-City	Stadion Rankhof	7,000
FC Frauenfeld	Thurgau	Kleine Allmend	6,370
FC Glattbrugg	Zürich	Sportanlage Au	1,250
FC Laufen	Basel-Country	Sportplatz Nau	3,000
SV Muttenz	Basel-Country	Sportplatz Margelacker	3,200
FC Red Star Zürich	Zürich	Allmend Brunau	2,000
FC Schaffhausen	Schaffhausen	Stadion Breite	7,300
FC Turgi	Aargau	Sportanlage Oberau	1,000
FC Unterstrass	Zürich	Steinkluppe	1,000
FC Uzwil	St. Gallen	Rüti	1,000

=== Final league table ===
Pos	Team	Pld	W	D	L	GF	GA	GD	Pts	Qualification or relegation
1	FC Frauenfeld	26	13	9	4	53	27	+26	35	Play-off to Nationalliga B
2	FC Laufen	26	11	8	7	55	41	+14	30	To decider for second place
3	FC Unterstrass	26	13	4	9	55	43	+12	30	To decider for second place
4	FC Schaffhausen	26	11	7	8	51	45	+6	29	
5	FC Birsfelden	26	11	6	9	37	42	−5	28	
6	SC Brühl	26	9	9	8	43	43	0	27	
7	FC Blue Stars Zürich	26	9	8	9	48	51	−3	26	
8	FC Baden	26	9	8	9	45	48	−3	26	
9	FC Concordia Basel	26	9	7	10	57	50	+7	25	
10	FC Glattbrugg	26	9	7	10	46	51	−5	25	
11	SV Muttenz	26	9	6	11	46	46	0	24	
12	FC Red Star Zürich	26	10	4	12	47	49	−2	24	Play-out against relegation
13	FC Uzwil	26	11	2	13	47	55	−8	24	Play-out against relegation
14	FC Turg	26	4	3	19	29	68	−39	11	Relegation to 2. Liga Interregional

Source: RSSSF
Rules for classification: 1) Points; 2) Goal difference within the league, but decider play-off for qualifier or relegation.

=== Decider for second place ===
The decider match for second place was played on 4 June in Olten.

Team 1	Score	Team 2
FC Laufen	3–2	FC Unterstrass

FC Laufen win and advance to play-offs. FC Unterstrass remain in the division.

=== Decider for twelfth place ===
The decider was played on 4 June in Amriswil.

Team 1	Score	Team 2
FC Red Star Zürich	4–0	FC Uzwil

FC Red Star Zürich win and remain in the division. FC Uzwil are relegated to 2. Liga Interregional.

== Group 4 ==
=== Teams ===
Club	Canton	Stadium	Capacity
FC Balzers	Liechtenstein	Sportplatz Rheinau	2,000
FC Brunnen	Schwyz	Wintersried	500
SC Buochs	Nidwalden	Stadion Seefeld	5,000
FC Chur	Grisons	Ringstrasse	2,820
SC Emmen	Lucerne	Sportanlage Feldbreite	500
US Giubiasco	Ticino	Campo Semine	1,000
FC Ibach	Schwyz	Gerbihof	3,300
FC Locarno	Locarno, Ticino	Stadio comunale Lido	5,000
Mendrisiostar	Ticino	Centro Sportivo Comunale	4,000
FC Morbio	Ticino	Campo comunale Balerna	800
FC Stäfa	Zürich	Sportanlage Frohberg	1,500
FC Turicum	Zürich	Hardhof	1,000
FC Zug	Zug	Herti Allmend Stadion	6,000
SC Zug	Zug	Herti Allmend Stadion	6,000

=== Final league table ===
Pos	Team	Pld	W	D	L	GF	GA	GD	Pts	Qualification or relegation
1	Mendrisiostar	26	15	8	3	46	21	+25	38	Play-off to Nationalliga B
2	SC Zug	26	14	8	4	56	28	+28	36	Play-off to Nationalliga B
3	FC Ibach	26	15	5	6	43	27	+16	35	
4	FC Locarno	26	11	8	7	44	33	+11	30	
5	FC Turicum	26	8	13	5	28	23	+5	29	
6	FC Balzers	26	10	6	10	57	49	+8	26	
7	FC Emmen	26	9	6	11	41	42	−1	24	
8	US Giubiasco	26	7	9	10	26	41	−15	23	
9	FC Morbio	26	7	9	10	30	49	−19	23	
10	FC Chur	26	5	12	9	34	43	−9	22	
11	FC Zug	26	7	7	12	49	47	+2	21	
12	FC Stäfa	26	7	7	12	28	37	−9	21	
13	SC Buochs	26	5	10	11	19	30	−11	20	Relegation to 2. Liga Interregional
14	FC Brunnen	26	6	4	16	25	56	−31	16	Relegation to 2. Liga Interregional

Source: RSSSF
Rules for classification: 1) Points; 2) Goal difference within the league, but decider play-off for qualifiers.

== Promotion play-off ==
=== Qualification round ===
Team 1	Score	Team 2
FC Bern	0–1	SC Zug
SC Zug	2–3	FC Bern

FC Bern win on away goals and continue to the finals.

Team 1	Score	Team 2
Mendrisiostar	1–0	FC Orbe
FC Orbe	0–3	Mendrisiostar

Mendrisiostar win 4–0 on aggregate and continue to the finals.

Team 1	Score	Team 2
FC Stade Lausanne	3–1	FC Laufen
FC Laufen	3–0	FC Stade Lausanne

FC Laufen win 4–3 on aggregate and continue to the finals.

Team 1	Score	Team 2
FC Frauenfeld	2–1	FC Köniz
FC Köniz	0–1	FC Frauenfeld

FC Frauenfeld win 3–1 on aggregate and continue to the finals.

=== Final round ===
Team 1	Score	Team 2
Mendrisiostar	2–1	FC Frauenfeld
FC Frauenfeld	2–0	Mendrisiostar

FC Frauenfeld win 3–2 on aggregate and are promoted to 1978–79 Nationalliga B.

Team 1	Score	Team 2
FC Laufen	0–1	FC Bern
FC Bern	0–1	FC Laufen

1–1 on aggregate. The replay was on 27 June in Grenchen.

Team 1	Score	Team 2
FC Bern	1–0	FC Laufen

FC Bern win and are promoted to 1978–79 Nationalliga B.

=== Decider for 1. Liga championship ===
The final for the 1. Liga championship was played on 2 July in Frauenfeld.

Team 1	Score	Team 2
FC Frauenfeld	0–1	FC Bern

FC Bern win and are 1. Liga champions.

== Further in Swiss football ==
- 1977–78 Nationalliga A
- 1977–78 Nationalliga B
- 1977–78 Swiss Cup

== Sources ==
- Switzerland 1977–78 at RSSSF

Preceded by 1976–77	Seasons in Swiss 1. Liga	Succeeded by 1978–79
