= 1977–78 Swiss Cup =

Tournament details
- Country: Switzerland

Final positions
- Champions: Servette
- Runners-up: Grasshopper Club

The 1977–78 Swiss Cup was the 53rd season of Switzerland's annual football cup competition.

== Overview ==
The cup competition began on the weekend of 11 and 12 June 1977 with the first games of the first round. The first round was completed on 7 August. The Swiss Cup competition was to be completed on Whit Monday 15 May 1978 with the final, which was held at the former Wankdorf Stadium in Bern. However, because the final ended with a draw, it required a replay and this took place on Sunday 4 June.

The clubs from this season's Nationalliga B (NLB) were granted byes for the first round. These teams entered the competition for the second round, played on the weekend of 13 and 14 of August. The teams from this season's Nationalliga A (NLA) were granted byes for the first three rounds. These teams joined the competition in the fourth round on 10 and 11 September. The matches were played in a knockout format. Up until the fifth-round, in the event of a draw at the end of extra time, the match was decided with a penalty shoot-out. In and after the fifth-round, a replay was foreseen and this was played on the visiting team's pitch. The winners of the cup qualified themselves for the first round of the Cup Winners' Cup in the next season.

== Round 1 ==
The teams from the lower divisions, who had qualified for this round through their regional football association's cup competitions or their requirements, competed in the first round.

=== Summary ===
Team 1	Score	Team 2
11 and 12 June 1977
Espagnol Genève	0–6	Stade Lausanne
US Meinier GE	1–2	FC Collex-Bossy
FC Bussigny	0–2	Meyrin
FC Selzach	2–2 (a.e.t.) (4–3 p)	FC Klus-Balsthal
FC Bettlach	1–4	Muttenz
SC Balerna	3–1	Locarno
FC Zollikofen	3–3 (a.e.t.) (p)	Köniz
FC Konolfingen	0–2	FC Lerchenfeld
FC Heimberg	2–7	Dürrenast
Rapid Ostermundigen	1–1 (a.e.t.) (p)	FC Aegerten-Brügg
FC Baar	1–3 (a.e.t.)	FC Zug
FC Sursee	1–2	SC Zug
FC Langenthal	3–1 (a.e.t.)	SC Derendingen
Yverdon-Sport	2–4	Stade Nyonnais
FC Saint-Prex	2–4	FC Renens
Concordia Lausanne	2–3	FC Epalinges
Marin-Sports	2–8	FC Superga (La Chaux-de-Fonds)
FC Courtepin	3–0	FC Orbe
FC Portalban	5–2	FC Boudry
FC Romont	0–0 (a.e.t.) (p)	FC Fétigny
FC Serrières	2–3	Le Locle-Sports
FC Corcelles Cormondrèche	0–2	Central Fribourg
FC Naters	0–2	Martigny-Sports
CS La Tour-de-Peilz	1–6	FC Saint-Maurice
Lengnau	1–1 (a.e.t.) (p)	Solothurn
FC Porrentruy	6–2	FC Binningen
FC Aesch	1–0	FC Birsfelden
FC Allschwil	1–1 (a.e.t.) (p)	SC Kleinhüningen
FC Stäfa ZH	1–4	FC Glattbrugg
FC Erlinsbach	1–3	FC Brugg
FC Brüttisellen	3–2	FC Oerlikon
FC Adliswil	6–1	FC Polizei ZH
FC Niederurnen	0–1	FC Pfäffikon
FC Einsielden	4–1	Blue Stars
FC Neuhausen	2–1	SV Höngg
FC Dietikon	8–1	FC Untersrass
FC Steckborn	2–3	FC Wiesendangen
FC Altstätten (St. Gallen)	1–2	FC Rüti ZH
FC Rebstein	2–2 (a.e.t.) (p)	Schaffhausen
US Danis-Tavanasa	6–3	Balzers
FC Agno	2–4	FC Morbio
1 July 1977
FC Dübendorf	0–2	Wettingen
7 August 1977
FC Estavayer-le-Lac	3–2	ASI Audax-Friul
FC Orsières	4–1	FC Sierre
FC Savièse	1–2	Monthey
SC Düdingen	5–1	Bern
FC Kirchberg	5–0	FC Aurore Bienne
FC Saignelégier	2–5	FC Courtemaîche
FC Laufenburg-Kaisten	1–2	Delémont
FC Breitenbach	2–4	US Boncourt
FC Welschenrohr	0–1	Laufen
FC Buchs AG	3–1	Baden
FC Suhr	4–1	FC Turgi
FC Flawil	2–1	Frauenfeld
FC Buchs SG	1–2	Chur
FC Altdorf (Uri)	1–0	FC Brunnen
Emmenbrücke	3–1	Buochs
US Giubiasco	1–4	AS Gambarogno
SV Sissach	0–6	Concordia
FC Stade Payerne	1–4	Bulle
FC Schattdorf	4–2	Ibach
FC Schwammendingen	1–2	Red Star
ES Malley	2–4	FC Onex
FC Uzwil	4–2	Brühl

== Round 2 ==
The teams from the NLB entered the cup competition in the second round. Whenever possible, the draw respected local regionalities. The lower-tier team in each drawn tie was granted the home advantage.

=== Summary ===
Team 1	Score	Team 2
13 and 14 August 1977
Laufen	3–0	Delémont
SC Kleinhüningen	4–2	FC Aesch
AS Gambarogno	0–2	Mendrisiostar
Balerna	1–5	Bellinzona
FC Schattdor	0–1	SC Zug
Emmenbrücke	8–0	FC Pfäffikon
FC Superga (La Chaux-de-Fonds)	1–3	FC Kirchberg
FC Neuhausen	0–2 (a.e.t.)	Aarau
FC Wiesendangen	1–0 (a.e.t.)	FC Brüttisellen
FC Flawil	3–2 (a.e.t.)	Chur
Martigny-Sports	2–1	FC Raron
Dürrenast	3–3 (a.e.t.) (3–4 p)	Central Fribourg
FC Orsières	1–2	Bulle
FC Epalinges	2–4	Meyrin
Muttenz	3–2 (a.e.t.)	FC Langenthal
Solothurn	1–2	Nordstern
SC Düdingen	1–3	FC Lerchenfeld
FC Le Locle	1–2	US Boncourt
FC Porrentruy	1–2	Biel-Bienne
FC Selzach	1–3	FC Courtemaîche
FC Einsielden	1–2 (a.e.t.)	Red Star
Brugg	3–1 (a.e.t.)	Winterthur
FC Dietikon	0–1	Luzern
FC Morbio	2–3 (a.e.t.)	Lugano
Courtepin	1–8	Fribourg
Stade Lausanne	2–3	Vevey Sports
FC Altdorf (Uri)	1–3	Chiasso
FC Adliswil	0–1	Kriens
FC Rüti ZH	0–3	Gossau
FC Buchs	4–2 (a.e.t.)	FC Glattbrugg
US Danis-Tavanasa	4–5 (a.e.t.)	FC Uzwil
FC Zug	1–1 (a.e.t.) (3–4 p)	Schaffhausen
Köniz	2–0	FC Estavayer-le-Lac
FC Aegerten-Brügg	1–1 (a.e.t.) (3–4 p)	La Chaux-de-Fonds
FC Suhr	4–3	Wettingen
Concordia	2–5	Grenchen
FC Portalban	2–3	FC Romont
FC Saint-Maurice	0–2	Monthey
Stade Nyonnais	3–1	FC Renens
FC Collex-Bossy	2–1	FC Onex

=== Matches ===
13 August 1977

FC Neuhausen	0–2 (a.e.t.)	Aarau
	FCA summary	(0:1) (0:2)

Langriet, Neuhausen am Rheinfall

== Round 3 ==
=== Summary ===
Team 1	Score	Team 2
20 August 1977
Mendrisiostar	2–0	Bellinzona
SC Zug	2–2 (a.e.t.) (5–3 p)	Emmenbrücke
Bulle	4–1	Meyrin
Martigny-Sports	2–1	Central Fribourg
FC Kirchberg	1–2	Aarau
Muttenz	2–1	Nordstern
Biel-Bienne	2–0	FC Courtemaîche
Luzern	3–2 (a.e.t.)	Lugano
Fribourg	2–1 (a.e.t.)	Vevey Sports
FC Uzwil	2–1	Schaffhausen
Gossau	2–0	Buochs
Chiasso	6–1	Kriens
FC Romont	0–5	Monthey
21 August 1977
FC Wiesendangen	0–5	FC Flawil
Red Star	5–3	Brugg
Laufen	3–0	SC Kleinhüningen
FC Suhr	1–1 (a.e.t.) (5–6 p)	Grenchen
Köniz	1–4	La Chaux-de-Fonds
FC Lerchenfeld	4–3 (a.e.t.)	US Boncourt
Stade Nyonnais	4–0	FC Collex-Bossy

=== Matches ===
20 August 1977

FC Kirchberg	1–2	Aarau
Goal	FCA summary	Goal

Hochweid, Kilchberg, Zürich

== Round 4 ==
The teams from the NLA entered the cup competition in the fourth round. The draw was still respecting regionalities and the lower-tier team was again granted the home advantage.

=== Summary ===
Team 1	Score	Team 2
10 September 1977
Laufen	0–4	Grasshopper Club
Aarau	3–0	FC Flawil
Martigny-Sports	1–3	Bulle
Muttenz	1–4	Zürich
FC Lerchenfeld	2–4	Basel
Biel-Bienne	2–0	Etoile Carouge
Red Star	0–3	St. Gallen
Luzern	2–1	Young Boys
Fribourg	3–0	Chênois
Chiasso	0–0 (a.e.t.) (5–4 p)	Young Fellows
Gossau	1–2	FC Uzwil
La Chaux-de-Fonds	4–3	Xamax
Grenchen	0–3	Sion
Monthey	0–2	Lausanne-Sport
Stade Nyonnais	1–12	Servette
11 September 1977
Mendrisiostar	1–4	SC Zug

=== Matches ===
10 September 1977
14:30

Aarau	3–0	FC Flawil
(0:1) (0:2) (0:3)	FCA summary

Stadion Brügglifeld, Aarau

10 September 1977
14:30

Muttenz	1–4	Zürich
Peter Bruderer 4' (1:0)	FCZ summary	35' (1:1) Chapuisat; 36' (1:2) Torstensson; 65' (1:3) Scheiwiler; 88' (1:4) Cucinotta

Sportplatz Margelacker, Muttenz
Attendance: 5,500
Referee: (Switzerland) Alfred Heinis (Ammannsegg, Biberist)

10 September 1977
14:30

FC Lerchenfeld	2–4	Basel
Zahnd 23' (1:0); Walther 29' (2:0)	FCB summary	38' (2:1) Nielsen; 44' (2:2) Muhmenthaler; 60' (2:3) Muhmenthaler; 84' (2:4) Muhmenthaler

Sportanlagen Waldeck, Lerchenfeld (Thun)
Attendance: 3,300
Referee: (Switzerland) Gottlieb Barmettler (Luzern)

10 September 1977
14:30

Luzern	2–1	Young Boys
Kaufmann 79' (1:0); Christen 88' (2:1)	YB summary	81' (1:1) Rebmann

Stadion Allmend, Lucerne
Attendance: 7,500
Referee: (Switzerland) Jakob Baumann (Schaffhausen)

10 September 1977

Stade Nyonnais	1–12	Servette
Goal	Servette summary	3x Schnyder; 2x Barberis; 4x Chivers; 2x Peterhans; 1x Andrey

Stade de Colovray, Nyon

== Round 5 ==
=== Summary ===
Team 1	Score	Team 2
11 October 1977
Aarau	1–2	Bulle
Lausanne-Sport	1–2 (a.e.t.)	Servette
12 October 1977
SC Zug	0–7	Grasshopper Club
Zürich	1–3	Basel
Biel-Bienne	1–2	St. Gallen
Luzern	1–0 (a.e.t.)	Fribourg
Chiasso	3–0	FC Uzwil
La Chaux-de-Fonds	1–0	Sion

=== Matches ===
11 October 1977

Aarau	1–2	Bulle
Goal	FCA summary	Goal

Stadion Brügglifeld, Aarau

11 October 1977

Lausanne-Sport	1–2 (a.e.t.)	Servette
Goal	Servette summary	Andrey; Barberis

Pontaise, Lausanne

12 October 1977
20:00

Zürich	1–3	Basel
Cucinotta (yellow card) 45'; Baur 56' (1:2)	FCB summary FCZ summary	19' (0:1) Schönenberger; 49' (0:2) Schönenberger; 66' (1:3) Schönenberger; (yellow card) 72' Mundschin

Letzigrund, Zürich
Attendance: 14,000
Referee: (Switzerland) Peter Scherz (Aegerten)

== Quarter-finals ==
=== Summary ===
Team 1	Score	Team 2
9 November 1977
Grasshopper Club	2–0	Bulle
Basel	4–1	St. Gallen
Luzern	2–3	Chiasso
La Chaux-de-Fonds	0–2	Servette

=== Matches ===
9 November 1977
19:30

Basel	4–1	St. Gallen
Schönenberger 14' (1:0); Maissen 51' (2:1); Lauscher 54' (3:1); Lauscher 88' (4:1)	FCB summary	38' (1:1) Ries

St. Jakob Stadium, Basel
Attendance: 5,500
Referee: (Switzerland) Otto Isler (Zürich)

9 November 1977
19:30

La Chaux-de-Fonds	0–2	Servette
	Servette summary	(0:1) Peterhans (0:2) Peterhans

Centre Sportif de la Charrière, La Chaux-de-Fonds

== Semi-finals ==
=== Summary ===
Team 1	Score	Team 2
27 March 1978
Chiasso	0–1	Servette
2 May 1978
Grasshopper Club	5–1	Basel

=== Matches ===
27 March 1978

Chiasso	0–1	Servette
	Servette summary	(0:1) Thouvenel

Stadio Comunale Riva IV, Chiasso

2 May 1978
20:00

Grasshopper Club	5–1	Basel
Bauer 12' (1:1); Sulser 49' (2:1); Hermann 53' (3:1); Elsener 62' (4:1); Ponte 88' (5:1); Niggl (yellow card)	FCB summary	4' (0:1) Lauscher; (yellow card) Lauscher

Hardturm, Zürich
Attendance: 9,000
Referee: (Switzerland) Jakob Baumann (Schaffhausen)

== Final ==
The final was held at the former Wankdorf Stadium in Bern on Whit Monday 1978.

=== Summary ===
Team 1	Score	Team 2
15 May 1978
Servette	2–2 (a.e.t.)	Grasshopper Club

Replay

Team 1	Score	Team 2
4 June 1978
Servette	1–0	Grasshopper Club

=== Telegram ===
15 May 1978
15:00

Servette	2–2 (a.e.t.)	Grasshopper Club
Peterhans 7' (1:0); Barberis 65' (2:2)	Fussball-Schweiz summary	60' (1:1) Ponte; 63' (1:2) Elsener

Wankdorf Stadium, Bern
Attendance: 33,000
Referee: (Switzerland) Walter Hungerbühler (St. Gallen)

4 June 1978
15:00

Servette	1–0	Grasshopper Club
Thouvenel 17' (1:0)	Fussball-Schweiz summary

Wankdorf Stadium, Bern
Attendance: 18,000
Referee: (Switzerland) Ernst Dörflinger (Grenchen)

Servette won the cup and this was the club's fourth cup title to this date.

== Further in Swiss football ==
- 1977–78 Nationalliga A
- 1977–78 Swiss 1. Liga

== Sources ==
- Fussball-Schweiz
- 1977–78 at fcb-achiv.ch
- Switzerland 1977–78 at RSSSF

Preceded by 1976–77	Swiss Cup seasons	Succeeded by 1978–79
