= 1976–77 Swiss 1. Liga =

1. Liga
- Season: 1976–77
- Champions: 1. Liga champions: FC Wettingen; Group 1: FC Bulle; Group 2: FC Bern; Group 3: FC Wettingen; Group 4: SC Zug
- Promoted: FC Wettingen; FC Bulle
- Relegated: Group 1: FC Sierre; Group 2: FC Superga; Group 3: SC Kleinhüningen; Group 4: FC Rüti
- Matches: 4 times 132 and 2 deciders plus 13 play-offs

The 1976–77 1. Liga was the 45th season of this league since its creation in 1931. At this time, the 1. Liga was the third tier of the Swiss football league system and it was the highest level of amateur football.

== Format ==
There was a modification to the 1. Liga taking place at this time. The 1. Liga had been increased from 39 clubs, in three groups last season, to 48 clubs for the beginning of this season. These 48 teams were divided into four regional groups, each group with 12 teams. Within each group, the teams would play a double round-robin to decide their league position. Two points were awarded for a win. The four group winners and the four runners-up contested a play-off round to decide the two promotion slots. At the end of the season the number of clubs was to be increased to 56 in four groups of 14 teams and, therefore, in this season only the last placed team from each group was to be relegated to the 2. Liga (fourth tier). From the following season onwards two teams from each group were to be relegated.

== Group 1 ==
=== Teams ===
Club	Canton	Stadium	Capacity
FC Boudry	Neuchâtel	Stade des Buchilles	1,500
FC Bulle	Fribourg	Stade de Bouleyres	7,000
FC Central Fribourg	Fribourg	Guintzet	2,000
FC Fétigny	Fribourg	Stade Communal Fétigny	500
FC Martigny-Sports	Valais	Stade d'Octodure	2,500
FC Meyrin	Geneva	Stade des Arbères	9,000
FC Monthey	Valais	Stade Philippe Pottier	1,800
FC Orbe	Vaud	Stade du Puisoir	1,000
FC Renens	Waadt	Zone sportive du Censuy	2,300
FC Sierre	Valais	Complexe Ecossia	2,000
FC Stade Lausanne	Vaud	Centre sportif de Vidy	1,000
FC Stade Nyonnais	Vaud	Stade de Colovray	7,200

=== Final league table ===
Pos	Team	Pld	W	D	L	GF	GA	GD	Pts	Qualification or relegation
1	FC Bulle	22	14	3	5	42	25	+17	31	Play-off to Nationalliga B
2	FC Stade Lausanne	22	13	4	5	46	24	+22	30	Play-off to Nationalliga B
3	FC Stade Nyonnais	22	12	4	6	37	27	+10	28	
4	FC Monthey	22	11	4	7	38	29	+9	26	
5	Central Fribourg	22	10	4	8	32	24	+8	24	
6	FC Meyrin	22	6	11	5	25	23	+2	23	
7	FC Fétigny	22	10	3	9	39	43	−4	23	
8	FC Orbe	22	8	6	8	40	37	+3	22	
9	FC Martigny-Sports	22	6	9	7	34	26	+8	21	
10	FC Boudry	22	5	6	11	25	36	−11	16	
11	FC Renens	22	4	4	14	28	57	−29	12	
12	FC Sierre	22	2	4	16	20	55	−35	8	Relegation to 2. Liga Interregional

Source: RSSSF
Rules for classification: 1) Points; 2) Goal difference within the league, but decider play-off for qualifiers.

== Group 2 ==
=== Teams ===
Club	Canton	Stadium	Capacity
ASI Audax-Friul	Neuchâtel	Pierre-à-Bot	1,700
FC Aurore Bienne	Bern	Tilleul-Linde	1,000
FC Bern	Bern	Stadion Neufeld	14,000
US Boncourt	Jura	Stade Communal Léon Burrus	1,640
SR Delémont	Jura	La Blancherie	5,263
SC Derendingen	Solothurn	Heidenegg	1,500
FC Dürrenast	Bern	Stadion Lachen	13,500
FC Köniz	Bern	Sportplatz Liebefeld-Hessgut	2,600
FC Le Locle	Neuchâtel	Installation sportive - Jeanneret	3,142
FC Lerchenfeld	Bern	Sportanlagen Waldeck	2,400
FC Solothurn	Solothurn	Stadion FC Solothurn	6,750
FC Superga	Neuchâtel	Collège de la Charrière	1,000

=== Final league table ===
Pos	Team	Pld	W	D	L	GF	GA	GD	Pts	Qualification or relegation
1	FC Bern	22	17	4	1	53	20	+33	38	Play-off to Nationalliga B
2	FC Köniz	22	11	9	2	41	18	+23	31	Play-off to Nationalliga B
3	FC Aurore Bienne	22	12	5	5	53	25	+28	29	
4	FC Le Locle	22	8	11	3	38	33	+5	27	
5	FC Solothurn	22	8	4	10	26	32	−6	20	
6	FC Dürrenast	22	6	7	9	26	30	−4	19	
7	US Boncourt	22	7	5	10	32	34	−2	19	
8	FC Lerchenfeld	22	8	3	11	34	46	−12	19	
9	SR Delémont	22	6	6	10	25	27	−2	18	
10	ASI Audax-Friul	22	5	6	11	20	42	−22	16	
11	SC Derendingen	22	5	5	12	26	45	−19	15	
12	FC Superga	22	5	3	14	25	47	−22	13	Relegation to 2. Liga Interregional

Source: RSSSF
Rules for classification: 1) Points; 2) Goal difference within the league, but decider play-off for qualifiers.

== Group 3 ==
=== Teams ===
Club	Canton	Stadium	Capacity
FC Baden	Aargau	Esp Stadium	7,000
FC Birsfelden	Basel-Country	Sternenfeld	9,400
FC Blue Stars Zürich	Zürich	Hardhof	1,000
SC Brühl	St. Gallen	Paul-Grüninger-Stadion	4,200
FC Concordia Basel	Basel-City	Stadion Rankhof	7,000
FC Frauenfeld	Thurgau	Kleine Allmend	6,370
SC Kleinhüningen	Basel-City	Sportplatz Schorenmatte	300
FC Laufen	Basel-Country	Sportplatz Nau	3,000
SV Muttenz	Basel-Country	Sportplatz Margelacker	3,200
FC Red Star Zürich	Zürich	Allmend Brunau	2,000
FC Schaffhausen	Schaffhausen	Stadion Breite	7,300
FC Wettingen	Aargau	Stadion Altenburg	10,000

=== Final league table ===
Pos	Team	Pld	W	D	L	GF	GA	GD	Pts	Qualification or relegation
1	FC Wettingen	22	16	3	3	59	14	+45	35	Play-off to Nationalliga B
2	FC Laufen	22	13	7	2	40	17	+23	33	Play-off to Nationalliga B
3	FC Frauenfeld	22	13	4	5	39	30	+9	30	
4	FC Concordia Basel	22	9	4	9	36	38	−2	22	
5	FC Schaffhausen	22	8	5	9	33	35	−2	21	
6	SV Muttenz	22	9	3	10	35	38	−3	21	
7	SC Brühl	22	8	4	10	33	39	−6	20	
8	FC Red Star Zürich	22	6	7	9	37	39	−2	19	
9	FC Baden	22	7	4	11	26	43	−17	18	
10	FC Blue Stars Zürich	22	6	5	11	26	30	−4	17	
11	FC Birsfelden	22	6	4	12	26	33	−7	16	
12	SC Kleinhüningen	22	4	4	14	21	55	−34	12	Relegation to 2. Liga Interregional

Source: RSSSF
Rules for classification: 1) Points; 2) Goal difference within the league, but decider play-off for qualifiers.

== Group 4 ==
=== Teams ===
Club	Canton	Stadium	Capacity
FC Balzers	Liechtenstein	Sportplatz Rheinau	2,000
FC Brunnen	Schwyz	Wintersried	500
SC Buochs	Nidwalden	Stadion Seefeld	5,000
FC Chur	Grisons	Ringstrasse	2,820
FC Glattbrugg	Zürich	Sportanlage Au	1,250
FC Ibach	Schwyz	Gerbihof	3,300
FC Locarno	Locarno, Ticino	Stadio comunale Lido	5,000
FC Morbio	Ticino	Campo comunale Balerna	800
FC Rüti	Zürich	Schützenwiese	1,200
FC Unterstrass	Zürich	Steinkluppe	1,000
FC Zug	Zug	Herti Allmend Stadion	6,000
SC Zug	Zug	Herti Allmend Stadion	6,000

=== Final league table ===
Pos	Team	Pld	W	D	L	GF	GA	GD	Pts	Qualification or relegation
1	SC Zug	22	11	9	2	46	28	+18	31	Play-off to Nationalliga B
2	FC Chur	22	10	7	5	51	36	+15	27	To decider for second place
3	FC Zug	22	11	5	6	42	34	+8	27	To decider for second place
4	FC Balzers	22	9	6	7	55	45	+10	24	
5	SC Buochs	22	7	9	6	41	38	+3	23	
6	FC Unterstrass	22	8	7	7	39	37	+2	23	
7	FC Glattbrugg	22	8	7	7	41	42	−1	23	
8	FC Brunnen	22	8	4	10	34	39	−5	20	
9	FC Locarno	22	7	6	9	27	38	−11	20	
10	FC Ibach	22	5	6	11	37	42	−5	16	
11	FC Morbio	22	4	7	11	24	38	−14	15	To decider against relegation
12	FC Rüti	22	3	9	10	29	49	−20	15	To decider against relegation

Source: RSSSF
Rules for classification: 1) Points; 2) Goal difference within the league, but decider play-off for qualifiers.

=== Decider for second place ===
The decider match for second place was played on 24 May in Küsnacht.

Team 1	Score	Team 2
FC Zug	3–1	FC Chur

FC Zug win and advance to play-offs. FC Chur remain in the division.

=== Decider for eleventh place ===
The decider was played on 30 May in Brunnen.

Team 1	Score	Team 2
FC Morbio	1–1	FC Rüti

The game was drawn, however, at this period in time, the extra-time as match extension had not yet been introduced. FC Morbio were declaired winners due to goal-average of the regular season and, therefore, they remained in the division and FC Rüti were relegated to 2. Liga Interregional.

== Promotion play-off ==
The games were played on 29 May and 5 June.

=== Qualification round ===
Team 1	Score	Team 2
SC Zug	1–1	FC Laufen
FC Laufen	1–0	SC Zug

FC Laufen win 2–1 on aggregate and continue to the finals.

Team 1	Score	Team 2
FC Bern	2–0	FC Zug
FC Zug	1–1	FC Bern

FC Bern win 3–1 on aggregate and continue to the finals.

Team 1	Score	Team 2
FC Bulle	3–0	FC Köniz
FC Köniz	2–2	FC Bulle

FC Bulle win 5–2 on aggregate and continue to the finals.

Team 1	Score	Team 2
FC Wettingen	1–0	FC Stade Lausanne
FC Stade Lausanne	0–2	FC Wettingen

FC Wettingen win 3–0 on aggregate and continue to the finals.

=== Final round ===
The games were played on 12 and 19 June.

Team 1	Score	Team 2
FC Bulle	4–0	FC Bern
FC Bern	2–1	FC Bulle

FC Bulle win 5–2 on aggregate and are promoted to 1977–78 Nationalliga B.

Team 1	Score	Team 2
FC Laufen	1–3	FC Wettingen
FC Wettingen	2–0	FC Laufen

FC Wettingen win 5–1 on aggregate and are promoted to 1977–78 Nationalliga B.

=== Decider for 1. Liga championship ===
The final for the league championship was played on 22 June in Wettingen.

Team 1	Score	Team 2
FC Wettingen	5–2	FC Bulle

FC Wettingen win and are 1. Liga champions.

== Further in Swiss football ==
- 1976–77 Nationalliga A
- 1976–77 Nationalliga B
- 1976–77 Swiss Cup

== Sources ==
- Switzerland 1976–77 at RSSSF

Preceded by 1975–76	Seasons in Swiss 1. Liga	Succeeded by 1977–78
