= 1978–79 Swiss Cup =

Tournament details
- Country: Switzerland

Final positions
- Champions: Servette
- Runners-up: Young Boys

The 1978–79 Swiss Cup was the 54th season of Switzerland's annual football cup competition.

== Overview ==
The competition began on the weekend 5 and 6 August 1978 with the first games of the first round and was completed on Whit Monday 4 June 1979 with the final, which was held at the former Wankdorf Stadium in Bern, but because it ended in a draw it required a replay, which took place on Wednesday 20 June. The teams from this season's Nationalliga B were granted byes for the first round. The games of the second round were played one week later, on the weekend 12 and 13 of August. The teams from this season's Nationalliga A were granted byes for the first three rounds. They joined the competition in the fourth round on 7 and 8 October. The matches were played in a knockout format. Up until the fifth-round, in the event of a draw at the end of extra time, the match was decided with a penalty shoot-out. In and after the fifth-round, a replay was foreseen and this was played on the visiting team's pitch. The winners of the cup qualified themselves for the first round of the Cup Winners' Cup in the next season.

== Round 1 ==
The teams from the lower divisions, who had qualified for this round through their regional football association's cup competitions or their requirements, competed in the first round.

=== Summary ===
Team 1	Score	Team 2
5 and 6 August 1978
Etoile Espagnole FC	2–1	FC Bussigny
FC Forward Morges	2–4	FC Orbe
FC Saint-Prex	3–4	Stade Lausanne
Signal FC (Bernex)	4–2	FC Renens
FC Assens	4–5 (a.e.t.)	Stade Nyonnais
FC Saint-Maurice	2–2 (a.e.t.) (3–4 p)	FC Raron
FC Savièse	2–2 (a.e.t.) (4–3 p)	Martigny-Sports
Montreux-Sports	0–2	Bulle
FC Courtepin	1–2	FC Rapid Ostermundigen
FC Portalban	0–6	FC Lerchenfeld
FC Frutigen	0–4	Köniz
FC Stade Payerne	0–1	FC Fétigny
SC Düdingen	4–2 (a.e.t.)	Dürrenast
FC Siviriez	2–1	Central Fribourg
FC Bôle	0–9	Le Locle-Sports
FC Superga (La Chaux-de-Fonds)	3–1	Yverdon-Sport
Moutier	0–1	FC Aurore Bienne
FC Courtemaîche	0–2	US Boncourt
FC Courgenay	1–3	Delémont
FC Aesch	0–5	Muttenz
Old Boys	0–2	FC Allschwil
FC Binningen	1–2	FC Birsfelden
Black Stars	1–5	Concordia
FC Sursee	3–1	FC Bremgarten
FC Buchs AG	0–4	Baden
SC Schöftland	3–1	FC Langenthal
FC Deitingen	2–1 (a.e.t.)	Solothurn
FC Biberist	1–3	FC Gerlafingen
Burgdorf	2–0	SC Derendingen
FC Hergiswil	3–3 (a.e.t.) (3–4 p)	SC Emmen
FC Seefeld ZH	2–4 (a.e.t.)	SC Zug
FC Wädenswil	2–3	FC Zug
FC Perlen	0–3	Ibach
Cham	0–4	Emmenbrücke
FC Goldau	0–3	Locarno
AS Gambarogno	0–5	FC Morbio
AC Tenero-Contra	2–3	Mendrisiostar
SC Balerna	3–0	US Giubiasco
FC Flawil	1–3 (a.e.t.)	FC Unterstrass ZH
FC Schwammendingen	2–5	FC Glattbrugg
FC Kilchberg	1–3	Red Star
FC Küsnacht ZH	1–0	Schaffhausen
FC Volketswil	3–2	FC Stäfa ZH
FC Töss	1–2	FC Tössfeld
FC Hinwil	1–3	FC Rüti ZH
FC Oberwinterthur	1–2	FC Eschenbach
Kreuzlingen	3–4	Brühl
FC Weinfelden-Bürglen	6–1	Vaduz
FC Bad Ragaz	1–4	Balzers
FC Vernier	1–2 (a.e.t.)	ES Malley
FC Collex-Bossy	3–2 (a.e.t.)	Meyrin
FC Bagnes-Le Châble	4–2	Monthey
FC Conthey	2–3	FC Visp
FC Brüttisellen	0–3	Blue Stars
FC Glattfelden	3–0	FC Turicum
FC Lamboing	0–1	SV Lyss
FC Kirchberg	4–4 (a.e.t.) (4–3 p)	FC Herzogenbuchsee
FC Estavayer-le-Lac	0–4	FC Boudry
Brugg	3–1	FC Suhr
SV Sissach	4–4 (a.e.t.) (p)	Laufen
La Rondinella (La Neuveville)	2–1	Marin-Sports
FC Rebstein	1–2 (a.e.t.)	Chur
FC Mels	1–0	Gossau
FC Aigle	3–2	FC Leytron

== Round 2 ==
The teams from the NLB joined the cup competition in the second round. Whenever possible, the draw was respecting regionalities and the lower-tier team was granted home advantage.

=== Summary ===
Team 1	Score	Team 2
12 and 13 August 1979
FC Lerchenfeld	2–2 (a.e.t.) (5–4 p)	Fribourg
FC Raron	0–2	Vevey Sports
US Boncourt	1–1 (a.e.t.) (1–4 p)	Biel-Bienne
Delémont	0–2	La Chaux-de-Fonds
ES Malley	0–3	Etoile Carouge
FC Birsfelden	0–4	Bern
FC Morbio	1–2	Luzern
Locarno	3–1	Bellinzona
Red Star	4–3	Young Fellows
Blue Stars	0–5	Winterthur
SV Lyss	1–3	Aarau
FC Sursee	0–1	Wettingen
Burgdorf	0–1	Grenchen
FC Kilchberg	0–4	Kriens
SC Balerna	1–7	Lugano
FC Weinfelden-Bürglen	1–2	Frauenfeld
FC Visp	1–2	Bulle
FC Le Locle	3–2	FC Boudry
Baden	3–1	Muttenz
FC Zug	0–3	SC Emmen
Mendrisiostar	3–1	Emmenbrücke
SC Zug	2–4	Ibach
FC Unterstrass	1–1	Brühl
FC Orbe	6–0	Superga La Chaux-de-Fonds
FC Siviriez	2–1	FC Fétigny
Etoile Espagnol FC	0–3	Stade Lausanne
SC Schöftland	2–3	FC Rapid Ostermundigen
FC Brugg	4–1	Köniz
Laufen	2–1	FC Gerlafingen
FC Allschwil	3–0	FC Deitingen
Concordia	0–4	SC Düdingen
FC Rüti ZH	2–1	FC Küsnacht
Balzers	7–2	FC Glattfelden
FC Bagnes-Le Châble	4–1	Stade Nyonnais
FC Aurore Bienne	0–1 (a.e.t.)	La Rondinella (La Neuveville)
FC Eschenbach	0–1	Chur
FC Mels	1–3	FC Glattbrugg
FC Savièse	6–1	FC Aigle
Signal FC (Bernex)	2–1	FC Collex-Bossy
FC Volketswil	1–4	FC Tössfeld

=== Matches ===
12 August 1979

SV Lyss	1–3	Aarau
Goal	FCA summary	Goal

Sportzentrum Grien, Lyss

== Round 3 ==
=== Summary ===
Team 1	Score	Team 2
19 August 1978
Kriens	4–1	Lugano
Biel-Bienne	4–2	FC Lerchenfeld
FC Savièse	2–4	La Chaux-de-Fonds
Grenchen	2–1 (a.e.t.)	Bern
FC Siviriez	2–9	Etoile Carouge
Luzern	3–0	Wettingen
Laufen	0–3	Baden
Stade Lausanne	2–1	Bulle
Düdingen	3–5	Aarau
FC Unterstrass ZH	1–2	Chur
FC Rüti ZH	1–3	Winterthur
FC Tössfeld	1–4	FC Glattbrugg
FC Allschwil	1–3	Ibach
La Rondinella (La Neuveville)	3–1	FC Bagnes-Le Châble
Brugg	1–3	FC Rapid Ostermundingen
SC Emmen	1–5	Red Star
FC Orbe	2–0	FC Le Locle
20 August 1978
Locarno	1–1 (a.e.t.) (4–2 p)	Balzers
Mendrisiostar	0–0 (a.e.t.) (4–3 p)	Frauenfeld
Signal FC (Bernex)	2–7	Vevey Sports

=== Matches ===
19 August 1978

Düdingen	3–5	Aarau
Goal	FCA summary	Goal

Stadion Birchhölzli, Düdingen

== Round 4 ==
The teams from the NLA joined the cup competition in the fourth round. The draw was still respecting regionalities and the lower-tier team was granted home advantage.

=== Summary ===
Team 1	Score	Team 2
7 October 1978
Biel-Bienne	1–3	Lausanne-Sport
La Chaux-de-Fonds	1–4	Chênois
Grenchen	1–3 (a.e.t.)	Etoile Carouge
Kriens	1–3	Chiasso
Luzern	2–0	Baden
Mendrisiostar	2–5	Nordstern
Vevey Sports	1–2 (a.e.t.)	Young Boys
Locarno	1–4	Grasshopper Club
La Rondinella (La Neuveville)	1–4 (a.e.t.)	Servette
Rapid Ostermundingen	1–6	Neuchâtel Xamax
Red Star	1–6	Zürich
FC Orbe	3–3 (a.e.t.) (0–3 p)	Sion
8 October 1978
Stade Lausanne	1–0	Aarau
FC Glattbrugg	0–7	Basel
Chur	0–4	Winterthur
Ibach	1–6	St. Gallen

=== Matches ===
7 October 1978

Vevey Sports	1–2 (a.e.t.)	Young Boys
Zweili 27' (1:1)	YB summary	23' (0:1) Conz; 107' Hussner

Stade de Copet, Vevey
Attendance: 2,200
Referee: (Switzerland) René Maire (Genève)

7 October 1978
15:30

La Rondinella (La Neuveville)	1–4 (a.e.t.)	Servette
Wenger 87' (1:0)	Report; Report	90+5' (pen.) Trinchero; 98' Barberis; 113' Elia; 120+1' (1:4) Trinchero

Le stade de Saint-Joux, La Neuveville
Attendance: 2,500
Referee: (Switzerland) Ernest Guignet (Yverdon-les-Bains)

7 October 1978

Red Star	1–6	Zürich
Schäuble 88' (1:5)	FCZ summary	4' (pen.) Botteron; 52' (0:2) Risi; 71' (0:3) Zwicker; 74' (0:4) Risi; 86' (0:5) Scheiwiler; 90' (1:6) Botteron

Letzigrund, Zürich
Attendance: 1,600
Referee: (Switzerland) Rudolf Affolter (Bülach)

8 October 1978

Stade Lausanne	1–0	Aarau
(1:0)	FCA summary

Centre sportif de Vidy, Ouchy, Lausanne

8 October 1978
15:00

FC Glattbrugg	0–7	Basel
	FCB summary	32' (0:1) von Wartburg; 36' (0:2) Lauscher; 48' (0:3) Schönenberger; 54' (0:4) Schönenberger; 71' (0:5) Schönenberger; 79' (0:6) Baldinger; 84' (0:7) Baldinger

Sportanlage Au, Glattbrugg
Attendance: 3,000
Referee: (Switzerland) Franz Gächter (Suhr)

== Round 5 ==
=== Summary ===
Team 1	Score	Team 2
9 December 1978
Winterthur	1–1 (a.e.t.)	Chênois
10 December 1978
Etoile Carouge	0–3	Servette
Nordstern	3–1	Stade Lausanne
Young Boys	2–0	Chiasso
St. Gallen	3–1	Grasshopper Club
Xamax	2–1 (a.e.t.)	Luzern
Zürich	1–3	Basel
17 December 1978
Sion	0–4	Lausanne-Sport

Replay

Team 1	Score	Team 2
17 December 1978
Chênois	4–1	Winterthur

=== Matches ===
10 December 1978

Etoile Carouge	0–3	Servette
	Servette summary	(0:1) Barberis (0:2) Hamberg (0:3) Hamberg

Stade de la Fontenette, Carouge

10 December 1978

Young Boys	2–0	Chiasso
Müller 71' (1:0); Müller 80' (2:0)	YB summary

Wankdorf Stadium, Bern
Attendance: 5,600
Referee: (Switzerland) Rudolf Renggli (Luzern)

10 December 1978
14:30

Zürich	1–3	Basel
Botteron (1:1); Zwicker (yellow card)	FCB summary FCZ summary	36' (0:1) Stohler; 68' (1:2) Marti; (yellow card) Demarmels; 89' (1:3) Lauscher

Letzigrund, Zürich
Attendance: 13,800
Referee: (Switzerland) Gottlieb Barmettler (Luzern)

== Quarter-finals ==
=== Summary ===
Team 1	Score	Team 2
14 March 1979
Nordstern	0–2	Servette
20 March 1979
Chênois	1–1	Lausanne-Sport
Young Boys	2–0	St. Gallen
Xamax	5–0	Basel

Replay

Team 1	Score	Team 2
22 March 1979
Lausanne-Sport	0–2	Chênois

=== Matches ===
14 March 1979
14:30

Nordstern	0–2	Servette
	Servette summary	(0:1) Weber (0:2) Barberis

Rankhof, Basel

20 March 1979
14:30

Young Boys	2–0	St. Gallen
Küttel 42' (1:0); Zwahlen 56' (2:0)	YB summary

Wankdorf Stadium, Bern
Attendance: 5,900
Referee: (Switzerland) Ernst Dörflinger (Grenchen)

20 March 1979
14:30

Xamax	5 – 0	Basel
Decastel 21' (1:0); Küffer 70' (2:0); Richard 77' (pen.); Lüthi (4:0); Decastel 87' (5:0)	FCB summary

Stade de la Maladière, Neuchâtel
Attendance: 2,000
Referee: (Switzerland) Peter Scherz

== Semi-finals ==
=== Summary ===
Team 1	Score	Team 2
16 April 1979
Servette	3–2	Xamax
Young Boys	1–0 (a.e.t.)	Chênois

=== Matches ===
16 April 1979
14:30

Servette	3–2	Xamax
Schnyder 4' (1:0); Hamberg 87' (2:2); Hamberg 90+1' (3:2)	Servette summary	7' (1:1) Weiler; 29' (1:2) Rub

Stade des Charmilles, Geneva

16 April 1979
14:30

Young Boys	1–0 (a.e.t.)	Chênois
Hussner 105' (1:0)	YB summary

Wankdorf Stadium, Bern
Attendance: 15,200
Referee: (Switzerland)

== Final ==
The final was held at the former Wankdorf Stadium in Bern on Whit Monday 1978.

=== Summary ===
Team 1	Score	Team 2
4 June 1978
Servette	1–1 (a.e.t.)	Young Boys

replay

Team 1	Score	Team 2
20 June 1978
Servette	3–2	Young Boys

=== Telegram ===
4 June 1978
15:00

Servette	1–1 (a.e.t.)	Young Boys
Pfister 52' (1:0)	Fussball-Schweiz summary	78' (1:1) Hussner

Wankdorf Stadium, Bern
Attendance: 35,000
Referee: (Switzerland) Rudolf Renggli (Luzern)

20 June 1978
15:00

Servette	3–2	Young Boys
Weber 28' (1:1); Barberis 63' (2:2); Hamberg 68' (3:2)	Fussball-Schweiz summary	11' (0:1) Schmidlin; 32' (1:2) Hussner

Wankdorf Stadium, Bern
Attendance: 30,000
Referee: (Switzerland) Bruno Galler (Kirchdorf, Bern)

Servette won the cup and this was the club's fifth cup title to this date, their second in succession. Because they won the Swiss championship as well, they won the domestic double, this for the first time in their history. In fact Sevette won the domestic treble because they won the 1978–79 Swiss League Cup. To top things up, they also won the 1978 Cup of the Alps and made it four trophies in one season.

== Further in Swiss football ==
- 1978–79 Nationalliga A
- 1978–79 Swiss 1. Liga

== Sources ==
- Fussball-Schweiz
- 1978–79 at fcb-achiv.ch
- Switzerland 1978–79 at RSSSF

Preceded by 1977–78	Swiss Cup seasons	Succeeded by 1979–80
