= 1976–77 Nationalliga A =

Swiss football season

Nationalliga A
- Season: 1976–77
- Champions: Basel
- Relegated: Winterthur; Bellinzona
- European Cup: Basel
- Cup Winners' Cup: Young Boys
- UEFA Cup: Servette; Zürich; Grasshopper Club
- Top goalscorer: Franco Cucinotta (Zürich); 28 goals

Nationalliga B
- Season: 1976–77
- Champions: Etoile Carouge
- Promoted: Etoile Carouge; Young Fellows Zürich
- Relegated: Mendrisiostar; FC Raron
- Top goalscorer: Stefan Fischer (SC Kriens); 19 goals

The following is the summary of the Swiss National League in the 1976–77 football season, both Nationalliga A and Nationalliga B. This was the 80th season of top-tier and the 79th season of second-tier football in Switzerland.

== Overview ==
The Swiss Football Association (ASF/SFV) had 28 members at this time and they had just reformed the Swiss football league system in advance of this season. The number of teams in the top tier (NLA) had been reduced from 14 to 12 and increased the second-tier (NLB) from 14 to 16 teams.

The NLA was contested by the first 11 teams from the previous season and the sole promoted team AC Bellinzona. The NLA was played in two stages. The first phase was the qualification and was played by all 12 teams in a double round-robin to decide their table positions. Two points were awarded for a win and one point was awarded for a draw. After completion of the qualification phase, the division was divided into two groups. The first six teams contended in the championship group and the teams in positions seventh to twelfth contended the relegation group. The teams took half of the points obtained in the qualification as bonus into the second stage. The first stage had 22 rounds, the second stage had 10 rounds. The champions would qualify for the 1977–78 European Cup and the Swiss Cup winners would qualify for 1977–78 Cup Winners' Cup. The UEFA modified the entry rules for Switzerland, therefore, this season three teams would qualify for the 1977–78 UEFA Cup. The last two teams in the relegation group dropped to the second-tier.

The NLB was contested 11 teams from that division the previous season, the three relegated teams Lugano, La Chaux-de-Fonds and Biel-Bienne and the two promoted teams Mendrisiostar and SC Kriens. The teams in the NLB played in just one stage, a total of 30 rounds. The top two teams achieved promotion, the bottom two teams were relegated to the 1. Liga.

== Nationalliga A ==
The first round of the NLA was played on 14 August 1976. There was a winter break between 5 December and 26 February 1977. The qualifying phase was completed by 16 April and the second phase took place between 30 April and 25 June. A championship play-off was required and this took place on 28 June 1977 at the Wankdorf Stadium in Bern in front of 55,000 supporters.

=== Teams, locations ===
Team	Town	Canton	Stadium	Capacity
FC Basel	Basel	Basel-Stadt	St. Jakob Stadium	36,800
AC Bellinzona	Bellinzona	Ticino	Stadio Comunale Bellinzona	5,000
CS Chênois	Thônex	Geneva	Stade des Trois-Chêne	8,000
Grasshopper Club Zürich	Zürich	Zürich	Hardturm	20,000
FC Lausanne-Sport	Lausanne	Vaud	Pontaise	15,700
Neuchâtel Xamax FC	Neuchâtel	Neuchâtel	Stade de la Maladière	25,500
FC St. Gallen	St. Gallen	St. Gallen	Espenmoos	11,000
Servette FC	Geneva	Geneva	Stade des Charmilles	27,000
FC Sion	Sion	Valais	Stade de Tourbillon	16,000
FC Winterthur	Winterthur	Zürich	Schützenwiese	8,550
BSC Young Boys	Bern	Bern	Wankdorf Stadium	56,000
FC Zürich	Zürich	Zürich	Letzigrund	25,000

==== Qualifying phase table ====
Pos	Team	Pld	W	D	L	GF	GA	GD	Pts	Qualification
1	Servette	22	14	7	1	68	27	+41	35	To championship round halved points (rounded up) as bonus
2	Basel	22	14	5	3	54	30	+24	33	To championship round halved points (rounded up) as bonus
3	Zürich	22	12	7	3	49	18	+31	31	To championship round halved points (rounded up) as bonus
4	Neuchâtel Xamax	22	10	7	5	37	27	+10	27	To championship round halved points (rounded up) as bonus
5	Young Boys	22	8	9	5	37	34	+3	25	To championship round halved points (rounded up) as bonus
6	Grasshopper Club	22	7	8	7	41	28	+13	22	To championship round halved points (rounded up) as bonus
7	Lausanne-Sport	22	8	6	8	39	31	+8	22	To relegation play-out round halved points (rounded up) as bonus
8	Chênois	22	6	8	8	29	39	−10	20	To relegation play-out round halved points (rounded up) as bonus
9	Sion	22	4	10	8	19	32	−13	18	To relegation play-out round halved points (rounded up) as bonus
10	St. Gallen	22	5	6	11	26	40	−14	16	To relegation play-out round halved points (rounded up) as bonus
11	Bellinzona	22	3	2	17	19	73	−54	8	To relegation play-out round halved points (rounded up) as bonus
12	Winterthur	22	1	5	16	19	58	−39	7	To relegation play-out round halved points (rounded up) as bonus

Source: rsssf.com
Rules for classification: 1) Points; 2) Goal difference; 3) Goals scored;

==== Results ====
Home \ Away	BAS	BEL	CHÊ	GCZ	LS	NX	SER	SIO	STG	YB	WIN	ZÜR
Basel		4–3	4–1	3–2	2–2	3–1	4–1	2–1	4–2	1–4	6–1	1–3
Bellinzona	1–2		1–1	1–3	1–0	2–2	0–4	2–1	0–1	0–2	4–1	0–3
Chênois	1–2	2–1		0–0	1–1	1–5	1–4	1–0	2–0	4–4	3–1	1–0
Grasshopper Club	1–1	8–2	1–1		4–0	0–1	1–1	0–2	1–1	1–3	4–0	2–2
Lausanne-Sports	0–1	5–0	3–0	1–2		1–2	3–7	3–0	5–0	0–0	3–0	1–1
Neuchâtel Xamax	0–2	5–0	0–0	3–2	0–2		1–1	0–0	1–0	2–2	2–0	2–1
Servette	2–2	10–0	2–1	2–1	3–0	1–1		6–0	4–1	3–1	2–0	2–1
Sion	0–0	2–1	1–1	1–3	2–2	0–3	1–1		3–1	0–0	2–0	1–1
St. Gallen	1–1	4–0	0–3	0–0	1–4	2–0	3–5	1–1		0–0	2–0	1–3
Young Boys	0–6	5–0	5–2	1–0	2–0	0–4	0–2	0–0	1–1		5–2	1–1
Winterthur	2–3	2–0	2–2	1–4	1–2	1–1	4–4	1–1	0–3	0–0		0–1
Zürich	1–0	6–0	2–0	1–1	1–1	6–1	1–1	3–0	2–1	5–1	4–0	

Source: rsssf.com
Legend: Blue = home team win; Yellow = draw; Red = away team win.

==== Championship table ====
Pos	Team	Pld	W	D	L	GF	GA	GD	BP	Pts	Qualification
1	Basel]	10	5	2	3	19	16	+3	17	29	Championship winners, qualified for 1977–78 European Cup
2	Servette	10	5	1	4	16	14	+2	18	29	Play-off losers, qualified for 1977–78 UEFA Cup
3	Zürich	10	5	1	4	24	18	+6	16	27	qualified for 1977–78 UEFA Cup and entered 1977 Intertoto Cup
4	Grasshopper Club	10	5	2	3	15	10	+5	11	23	qualified for 1977–78 UEFA Cup and entered 1977 Intertoto Cup
5	Xamax	10	3	1	6	14	18	−4	14	21	
6	Young Boys	10	3	1	6	12	24	−12	13	20	Swiss Cup winners, qualified for 1977–78 Cup Winners' Cup and entered 1977 Intertoto Cup

Source: rsssf.com
Rules for classification: 1) Points; 2) Goal difference within the league, but play-off for the title.

==== Championship play-off ====
28 June 1977
20:15
Play-Off

Basel	2–1	Servette
Mundschin 37' von Wartburg 75'	FCB report	30' Müller; (yellow card) 66' Thouvenel; (yellow card) 77' Guyot

Wankdorf Stadium, Bern
Attendance: 55,000
Referee: (Switzerland) Ruedi Renggli

==== Results ====
Home \ Away	BAS	GCZ	NX	SER	YB	ZÜR
Basel		2–3	3–1	2–0	2–0	3–1
Grasshopper Club	6–1		2–1	0–0	0–0	0–2
Neuchâtel Xamax	0–0	0–1		4–2	2–0	2–0
Servette	2–0	3–0	3–1		4–1	1–0
Young Boys	0–3	0–3	2–1	2–1		1–5
Zürich	3–3	1–0	5–2	4–0	3–6	

Source: rsssf.com
Legend: Blue = home team win; Yellow = draw; Red = away team win.

==== Relegation play-out ====
Pos	Team	Pld	W	D	L	GF	GA	GD	BP	Pts	Qualification or relegation
1	Lausanne-Sport	10	7	3	0	24	7	+17	11	28	
2	Chênois	10	5	4	1	24	13	+11	10	24	Entered 1977 Intertoto Cup
3	Sion	10	5	0	5	18	17	+1	9	19	
4	St. Gallen	10	3	2	5	18	19	−1	8	16	
5	Winterthur	10	3	3	4	11	14	−3	4	13	Relegated to 1977–78 Nationalliga B
6	Bellinzona	10	0	2	8	7	32	−25	4	6	Relegated to 1977–78 Nationalliga B

Source: rsssf.com
Rules for classification: 1) Points; 2) Goal difference; 3) Goals scored;

==== Results ====
Home \ Away	BEL	CHÊ	LS	SIO	STG	WIN
Bellinzona		0–1	0–0	1–2	1–3	0–0
Chênois	6–2		1–1	3–2	0–1	4–0
Lausanne-Sports	5–0	2–2		2–0	3–1	1–0
Sion	7–1	1–1	0–4		3–1	1–1
St. Gallen	5–1	1–3	2–4	3–1		1–0
Winterthur	3–1	3–3	1–2	2–1	1–0	

Source: rsssf.com
Legend: Blue = home team win; Yellow = draw; Red = away team win.

== Nationalliga B ==
=== Teams, locations ===
Team	Town	Canton	Stadium	Capacity
FC Aarau	Aarau	Aargau	Stadion Brügglifeld	9,240
FC Biel-Bienne	Biel/Bienne	Bern	Stadion Gurzelen	15,000
FC Chiasso	Chiasso	Ticino	Stadio Comunale Riva IV	4,000
Étoile Carouge FC	Carouge	Geneva	Stade de la Fontenette	3,690
FC Fribourg	Fribourg	Fribourg	Stade Universitaire	9,000
FC Gossau	Gossau	St. Gallen	Sportanlage Buechenwald	3,500
FC Grenchen	Grenchen	Solothurn	Stadium Brühl	15,100
SC Kriens	Kriens	Lucerne	Stadion Kleinfeld	5,100
FC La Chaux-de-Fonds	La Chaux-de-Fonds	Neuchâtel	Centre Sportif de la Charrière	12,700
FC Lugano	Lugano	Ticino	Cornaredo Stadium	6,330
FC Luzern	Lucerne	Lucerne	Stadion Allmend	25,000
Mendrisiostar	Mendrisio	Ticino	Centro Sportivo Comunale	4,000
FC Nordstern Basel	Basel	Basel-Stadt	Rankhof	7,600
FC Raron	Raron	Valais	Sportplatz Rhoneglut	1,000
Vevey-Sports	Vevey	Vaud	Stade de Copet	4,000
FC Young Fellows Zürich	Zürich	Zürich	Utogrund	2,850

=== Final league table ===
Pos	Team	Pld	W	D	L	GF	GA	GD	Pts	Relegation
1	Etoile Carouge	30	19	6	5	58	32	+26	44	NLB Champions promoted to 1978–79 Nationalliga A
2	FC Young Fellows Zürich	30	15	11	4	52	25	+27	41	Promoted to 1978–79 Nationalliga A
3	Nordstern Basel	30	15	10	5	53	28	+25	40	
4	Lugano	30	13	9	8	37	30	+7	35	
5	FC Chiasso	30	12	10	8	37	24	+13	34	
6	La Chaux-de-Fonds	30	14	5	11	55	41	+14	33	
7	FC Grenchen	30	11	11	8	31	29	+2	33	
8	SC Kriens	30	11	7	12	42	45	−3	29	
9	Luzern	30	9	10	11	35	43	−8	28	
10	Vevey-Sports	30	9	8	13	38	47	−9	26	
11	FC Fribourg	30	7	12	11	32	42	−10	26	
12	FC Gossau	30	8	8	14	30	44	−14	24	
13	FC Aarau	30	9	5	16	34	43	−9	23	
14	FC Biel-Bienne	30	6	10	14	30	49	−19	22	
15	Mendrisiostar	30	8	5	17	28	46	−18	21	Relegated to 1978–79 1. Liga
16	FC Raron	30	7	7	16	28	52	−24	21	Relegated to 1978–79 1. Liga

Source: rsssf.com
Rules for classification: 1) Points; 2) Goal difference within the league, but decider play-off for qualifiers; 3) Goals scored;

== Attendances ==
#	Club	Average
1	Basel	11,219
2	Servette	10,381
3	Young Boys	10,031
4	Zürich	8,219
5	Xamax	6,528
6	Grasshopper	6,225
7	Lausanne	4,469
8	St. Gallen	3,794
9	Sion	2,975
10	Bellinzona	2,501
11	Chênois	2,381
12	Winterthur	2,281

== Further in Swiss football ==
- 1976–77 Swiss Cup
- 1976–77 Swiss 1. Liga

== Sources ==
- Switzerland 1976–77 at RSSSF

Preceded by 1975–76	Nationalliga seasons in Switzerland	Succeeded by 1977–78
