= 1978–79 Swiss 1. Liga =

1. Liga
- Season: 1978–79
- Champions: 1. Liga champions: FC Raron; Group 1: FC Raron; Group 2: SR Delémont; Group 3: SV Muttenz; Group 4: FC Locarno
- Promoted: FC Raron; FC Baden
- Relegated: Group 1: Yverdon-Sport FC; FC Le Locle; Group 2: FC Dürrenast; FC Rapid Ostermundigen; Group 3: FC Red Star Zürich; FC Concordia Basel; Group 4: FC Chur; US Giubiasco
- Matches: 4 times 182 plus 13 play-offs

The 1978–79 1. Liga was the 47th season of this league since its creation in 1931. At this time, the 1. Liga was the third tier of the Swiss football league system and it was the highest level of amateur football.

== Format ==
There were 56 clubs in the 1. Liga. These were divided into four regional groups, each with 14 teams. Within each group, the teams would play a double round-robin to decide their league position. Two points were awarded for a win. The four group winners and the four runners-up contested a play-off round to decide the two promotion slots. The two last placed teams in each group were directly relegated to the 2. Liga (fourth tier).

== Group 1 ==
=== Teams ===
Club	Canton	Stadium	Capacity
FC Boudry	Neuchâtel	Stade des Buchilles	1,500
FC Leytron	Valais	Stade Saint-Martin	1,000
FC Le Locle	Neuchâtel	Installation sportive - Jeanneret	3,142
ES FC Malley	Vaud	Centre sportif de la Tuilière	1,500
FC Martigny-Sports	Valais	Stade d'Octodure	2,500
FC Meyrin	Geneva	Stade des Arbères	9,000
FC Monthey	Valais	Stade Philippe Pottier	1,800
FC Orbe	Vaud	Stade du Puisoir	1,000
FC Raron	Valais	Sportplatz Rhoneglut	1,000
FC Renens	Waadt	Zone sportive du Censuy	2,300
FC Stade Lausanne	Vaud	Centre sportif de Vidy	1,000
FC Stade Nyonnais	Vaud	Stade de Colovray	7,200
FC Visp	Valais	Sportplatz Mühleye	1,000
Yverdon-Sport FC	Vaud	Stade Municipal	6,600

=== Final league table ===
Pos	Team	Pld	W	D	L	GF	GA	GD	Pts	Qualification or relegation
1	FC Raron	26	16	8	2	58	21	+37	40	Play-off to Nationalliga B
2	FC Stade Lausanne	27	15	5	7	59	42	+17	35	Play-off to Nationalliga B
3	FC Renens	26	13	6	7	47	32	+15	32	
4	FC Martigny-Sports	26	12	6	8	44	36	+8	30	
5	ES FC Malley	26	10	6	10	51	46	+5	26	
6	FC Orbe	26	11	4	11	61	58	+3	26	
7	FC Stade Nyonnais	26	9	8	9	38	39	−1	26	
8	FC Boudry	26	10	6	10	38	43	−5	26	
9	FC Leytron	26	10	5	11	57	50	+7	25	
10	FC Meyrin	26	8	8	10	33	40	−7	24	
11	FC Monthey	26	8	7	11	28	40	−12	23	
12	FC Visp	26	9	4	13	31	41	−10	22	
13	Yverdon-Sport FC	26	9	3	14	31	48	−17	21	Relegation to 2. Liga Interregional
14	FC Le Locle	26	3	2	21	24	64	−40	8	Relegation to 2. Liga Interregional

Source: RSSSF
Rules for classification: 1) Points; 2) Goal difference within the league, but decider play-off for qualifiers.

== Group 2 ==
=== Teams ===
Club	Canton	Stadium	Capacity
FC Aurore Bienne	Bern	Tilleul-Linde	1,000
US Boncourt	Jura	Stade Communal Léon Burrus	1,640
FC Bulle	Fribourg	Stade de Bouleyres	7,000
FC Central Fribourg	Fribourg	Guintzet	2,000
SR Delémont	Jura	La Blancherie	5,263
SC Derendingen	Solothurn	Heidenegg	1,500
FC Dürrenast	Bern	Stadion Lachen	13,500
FC Fétigny	Fribourg	Stade Communal Fétigny	500
FC Herzogenbuchsee	Bern	Waldäcker	1,000
FC Köniz	Bern	Sportplatz Liebefeld-Hessgut	2,600
FC Laufen	Basel-Country	Sportplatz Nau	3,000
FC Lerchenfeld	canton of Bern	Sportanlagen Waldeck	2,400
FC Rapid Ostermundigen	Bern	Oberfeld	1,000
FC Solothurn	Solothurn	Stadion FC Solothurn	6,750

=== Final league table ===
Pos	Team	Pld	W	D	L	GF	GA	GD	Pts	Qualification or relegation
1	SR Delémont	26	18	7	1	60	24	+36	43	Play-off to Nationalliga B
2	FC Bulle	26	13	7	6	45	35	+10	33	Play-off to Nationalliga B
3	FC Lerchenfeld	26	11	8	7	45	31	+14	30	
4	FC Solothurn	26	11	7	8	41	30	+11	29	
5	US Boncourt	26	11	7	8	38	32	+6	29	
6	FC Aurore Bienne	26	10	8	8	30	30	0	28	
7	Central Fribourg	26	8	10	8	41	41	0	26	
8	FC Köniz	26	9	7	10	31	36	−5	25	
9	FC Laufen	26	6	10	10	26	34	−8	22	
10	FC Fétigny	26	6	10	10	41	53	−12	22	
11	FC Herzogenbuchsee	26	6	9	11	35	51	−16	21	
12	SC Derendingen	26	5	10	11	20	33	−13	20	
13	FC Dürrenast	26	6	6	14	36	47	−11	18	Relegation to 2. Liga Interregional
14	FC Rapid Ostermundigen	26	5	8	13	41	53	−12	18	Relegation to 2. Liga Interregional

Source: RSSSF
Rules for classification: 1) Points; 2) Goal difference within the league, but decider play-off for qualifiers.

== Group 3 ==
=== Teams ===
Club	Canton	Stadium	Capacity
FC Allschwil	Basel-Country	Im Brüel, Allschwil	1,700
FC Baden	Aargau	Esp Stadium	7,000
FC Birsfelden	Basel-Country	Sternenfeld	9,400
FC Blue Stars Zürich	Zürich	Hardhof	1,000
SC Brühl	St. Gallen	Paul-Grüninger-Stadion	4,200
FC Concordia Basel	Basel-City	Stadion Rankhof	7,000
FC Glattbrugg	Zürich	Sportanlage Au	1,250
FC Gossau	St. Gallen	Sportanlage Buechenwald	3,500
SV Muttenz	Basel-Country	Sportplatz Margelacker	3,200
FC Red Star Zürich	Zürich	Allmend Brunau	2,000
FC Schaffhausen	Schaffhausen	Stadion Breite	7,300
FC Suhr	Aargau	Hofstattmatten	2,000
FC Turicum	Zürich	Hardhof	1,000
FC Unterstrass	Zürich	Steinkluppe	1,000

=== Final league table ===
Pos	Team	Pld	W	D	L	GF	GA	GD	Pts	Qualification or relegation
1	SV Muttenz	26	17	4	5	54	26	+28	38	Play-off to Nationalliga B
2	FC Baden	26	16	5	5	49	37	+12	37	Play-off to Nationalliga B
3	FC Schaffhausen	26	16	4	6	55	27	+28	36	
4	FC Turicum	26	11	9	6	46	38	+8	31	
5	FC Birsfelden	26	10	9	7	45	39	+6	29	
6	SC Brühl	26	13	2	11	50	46	+4	28	
7	FC Suhr	26	11	5	10	46	43	+3	27	
8	FC Blue Stars Zürich	26	10	7	9	48	46	+2	27	
9	FC Allschwil	26	8	6	12	31	43	−12	22	
10	FC Glattbrugg	26	7	5	14	37	47	−10	19	
11	FC Unterstrass	26	5	8	13	36	54	−18	18	
12	FC Gossau	26	4	10	12	30	50	−20	18	
13	FC Red Star Zürich	26	6	5	15	44	56	−12	17	Relegation to 2. Liga Interregional
14	FC Concordia Basel	26	5	7	14	34	53	−19	17	Relegation to 2. Liga Interregional

Source: RSSSF
Rules for classification: 1) Points; 2) Goal difference within the league, but decider play-off for qualifiers.

== Group 4 ==
=== Teams ===
Club	Canton	Stadium	Capacity
FC Balzers	Liechtenstein	Sportplatz Rheinau	2,000
FC Chur	Grisons	Ringstrasse	2,820
SC Emmen	Lucerne	Sportanlage Feldbreite	500
FC Emmenbrücke	Lucerne	Stadion Gersag	8,700
US Giubiasco	Ticino	Campo Semine	1,000
FC Ibach	Schwyz	Gerbihof	3,300
FC Locarno	Locarno, Ticino	Stadio comunale Lido	5,000
Mendrisiostar	Ticino	Centro Sportivo Comunale	4,000
FC Morbio	Ticino	Campo comunale Balerna	800
FC Rüti	Zürich	Schützenwiese	1,200
FC Stäfa	Zürich	Sportanlage Frohberg	1,500
FC Vaduz	Liechtenstein	Rheinpark Stadion	7,584
FC Zug	Zug	Herti Allmend Stadion	6,000
SC Zug	Zug	Herti Allmend Stadion	6,000

=== Final league table ===
Pos	Team	Pld	W	D	L	GF	GA	GD	Pts	Qualification or relegation
1	FC Locarno	26	13	9	4	43	23	+20	35	Play-off to Nationalliga B
2	FC Ibach	26	16	3	7	46	30	+16	35	Play-off to Nationalliga B
3	Mendrisiostar	26	13	8	5	49	28	+21	34	
4	SC Zug	26	12	7	7	53	37	+16	31	
5	FC Balzers	26	13	4	9	58	44	+14	30	
6	FC Vaduz	26	10	8	8	50	43	+7	28	
7	FC Stäfa	26	11	6	9	32	28	+4	28	
8	FC Emmenbrücke	26	8	10	8	42	36	+6	26	
9	FC Morbio	26	9	6	11	36	44	−8	24	
10	FC Zug	26	9	4	13	37	47	−10	22	
11	FC Rüti	26	7	7	12	31	36	−5	21	
12	FC Emmen	26	6	8	12	29	62	−33	20	
13	FC Chur	26	5	7	14	31	48	−17	17	Relegation to 2. Liga Interregional
14	US Giubiasco	26	5	3	18	33	64	−31	13	Relegation to 2. Liga Interregional

Source: RSSSF
Rules for classification: 1) Points; 2) Goal difference within the league, but decider play-off for qualifiers.

== Promotion play-off ==
=== Qualification round ===
Team 1	Score	Team 2
SV Muttenz	0–1	FC Ibach
FC Ibach	5–2	SV Muttenz

FC Ibach win 6–2 on aggregate and continue to the semi-finals.

Team 1	Score	Team 2
FC Baden	1–0	FC Locarno
FC Locarno	2–2	FC Baden

FC Baden win 3–2 on aggregate and continue to the semi-finals.

Team 1	Score	Team 2
FC Bulle	0–1	FC Raron
FC Raron	3–2	FC Bulle

FC Raron win 4–2 on aggregate and continue to the semi-finals.

Team 1	Score	Team 2
FC Stade Lausanne	2–3	SR Delémont
SR Delémont	1–0	FC Stade Lausanne

SR Delémont win 4–2 on aggregate and continue to the semi-finals.

=== Semi-final round ===
Team 1	Score	Team 2
FC Ibach	1–3	FC Raron
FC Raron	3–1	FC Ibach

FC Raron win 6–2 on aggregate and are promoted to 1979–80 Nationalliga B. FC Ibach remain in the division.

Team 1	Score	Team 2
FC Baden	1–0	SR Delémont
SR Delémont	1–1	FC Baden

FC Baden win 2–1 on aggregate and are promoted to 1979–80 Nationalliga B. SR Delémont remain in the division.

=== Final for 1. Liga championship ===
The final was played on 1 July in Baden.

Team 1	Score	Team 2
FC Baden	0–1	FC Raron

FC Raron win and became 1. Liga champions.

== Further in Swiss football ==
- 1978–79 Nationalliga A
- 1978–79 Nationalliga B
- 1978–79 Swiss Cup

== Sources ==
- Switzerland 1978–79 at RSSSF

Preceded by 1977–78	Seasons in Swiss 1. Liga	Succeeded by 1979–80
