= 1977–78 Nationalliga A =

Swiss football season

Nationalliga A
- Season: 1977–78
- Champions: Grasshopper Club
- Relegated: Étoile Carouge; Young Fellows
- European Cup: Grasshopper Club
- Cup Winners' Cup: Servette
- UEFA Cup: Basel; Lausanne-Sport
- Top goalscorer: Fritz Künzli (Zürich); 21 goals

Nationalliga B
- Season: 1977–78
- Champions: Nordstern
- Promoted: Nordstern; Chiasso
- Relegated: Gossau; Bulle
- Top goalscorer: Helmut Degen (Nordstern); 27 goals

The following is the summary of the Swiss National League in the 1977–78 football season, both Nationalliga A and Nationalliga B. This was the 81st season of top-tier and the 80th season of second-tier football in Switzerland.

== Overview ==
The Swiss Football Association (ASF/SFV) had 28 members at this time. The clubs were divided into two tiers, the top tier Nationalliga A (NLA) with 12 teams and the second tier Nationalliga B (NLB) with 16. The format in both divisions was that the teams played a double round-robin to decide their table positions. Two points were awarded for a win and one point was awarded for a draw. Each club playing every other club twice (home and away), for a total of 22 rounds in the NLA and 30 rounds in the NLB.

In the NLA following this first qualification stage the division was divided in two, the top placed six teams then played a championship stage and the other teams in a relegation play-out. In both groups each team took half of the points gained in the first stage, rounded up to complete units, as bonus with them. They played a further double round-robin within the group. The Swiss champions would qualify for the 1978–79 European Cup, the runners-up and third placed team would qualify for the 1978–79 UEFA Cup. From the play-out group the bottom two teams were relegated to the second-tier. From the NLB the top two teams were promoted and the bottom two teams relegated to the 1978–79 1. Liga.

== Nationalliga A ==
The first round of the NLA was played on 13 August 1977. There was a winter break between 11 December and 26 February 1978. The qualifying phase was completed by 25 March and the second phase took place between 1 April and 27 May 1978.

=== Teams, locations ===
Team	Town	Canton	Stadium	Capacity
FC Basel	Basel	Basel-Stadt	St. Jakob Stadium	36,800
CS Chênois	Thônex	Geneva	Stade des Trois-Chêne	8,000
Étoile Carouge FC	Carouge	Geneva	Stade de la Fontenette	3,690
Grasshopper Club Zürich	Zürich	Zürich	Hardturm	20,000
FC Lausanne-Sport	Lausanne	Vaud	Pontaise	15,700
Neuchâtel Xamax FC	Neuchâtel	Neuchâtel	Stade de la Maladière	25,500
FC St. Gallen	St. Gallen	St. Gallen	Espenmoos	11,000
Servette FC	Geneva	Geneva	Stade des Charmilles	27,000
FC Sion	Sion	Valais	Stade de Tourbillon	16,000
BSC Young Boys	Bern	Bern	Wankdorf Stadium	56,000
FC Young Fellows Zürich	Zürich	Zürich	Utogrund	2,850
FC Zürich	Zürich	Zürich	Letzigrund	25,000

=== Qualifying phase table ===
Pos	Team	Pld	W	D	L	GF	GA	GD	Pts	Qualification
1	Grasshopper Club	22	15	4	3	60	27	+33	34	To championship round
2	Servette	22	14	5	3	44	20	+24	33	To championship round
3	Lausanne-Sport	22	13	4	5	47	21	+26	30	To championship round
4	Basel	22	12	4	6	53	34	+19	28	To championship round
5	FC Zürich	22	11	6	5	38	27	+11	28	To championship round
6	Sion	22	6	9	7	29	33	−4	21	To championship round
7	Xamax	22	8	3	11	32	42	−10	19	To relegation play-out round
8	Young Boys	22	7	5	10	27	45	−18	19	To relegation play-out round
9	Chênois	22	8	2	12	27	35	−8	18	To relegation play-out round
10	St. Gallen	22	5	7	10	27	38	−11	17	To relegation play-out round
11	Étoile Carouge	22	5	3	14	22	40	−18	13	To relegation play-out round
12	Young Fellows Zürich	22	1	2	19	14	58	−44	4	To relegation play-out round

Source: rsssf.com
Rules for classification: 1) Points; 2) Goal difference; 3) Goals scored;

==== Results ====
Home \ Away	BAS	CHÊ	ÉTO	GCZ	LS	NX	SER	SIO	STG	YB	YFZ	ZÜR
Basel		3–1	4–0	2–5	1–4	6–1	2–1	5–0	4–2	0–0	5–0	2–2
Chênois	2–0		1–0	1–3	0–2	3–1	1–0	2–1	1–1	1–2	5–0	0–2
Étoile Carouge	1–0	0–2		2–3	1–3	0–1	2–2	0–3	2–1	0–1	3–0	2–1
Grasshopper Club	0–1	5–1	3–2		2–0	2–0	0–1	3–0	3–2	3–0	1–1	7–2
Lausanne-Sports	0–0	3–0	1–0	1–0		3–0	1–2	2–0	4–1	6–0	4–1	1–1
Neuchâtel Xamax	2–5	1–0	2–1	2–3	1–3		0–1	1–1	3–0	5–0	3–2	1–2
Servette	2–0	2–1	2–1	2–2	3–1	3–0		2–2	0–0	5–1	2–0	0–2
Sion	4–1	0–0	1–1	2–2	3–2	3–1	0–2		0–0	1–1	2–0	0–1
St. Gallen	1–2	5–3	2–0	2–6	2–2	0–1	2–2	1–1		0–2	1–0	2–0
Young Boys	4–5	0–1	2–2	1–4	1–1	1–1	1–5	3–1	2–1		3–0	0–1
Young Fellows	1–4	3–1	0–1	1–1	0–3	2–4	0–3	1–2	0–1	0–1		1–3
Zürich	1–1	1–0	5–1	1–2	2–0	1–1	1–2	2–2	0–0	2–1	5–1	

Source: rsssf.com
Legend: Blue = home team win; Yellow = draw; Red = away team win.

=== Championship table ===
Pos	Team	Pld	W	D	L	GF	GA	GD	BP	Pts	Qualification
1	Grasshopper Club	10	4	4	2	17	12	+5	17	29	Swiss Champions, qualified for 1978–79 European Cup and entered 1978 Intertoto Cup
2	Servette	10	3	5	2	10	10	0	17	28	Swiss Cup winners, qualified for 1978–79 Cup Winners' Cup
3	Basel	10	5	3	2	21	14	+7	14	27	qualified for 1978–79 UEFA Cup
4	Lausanne-Sport	10	4	3	3	21	14	+7	15	26	qualified for 1978–79 UEFA Cup
5	Zürich	10	5	2	3	15	15	0	14	26	entered 1978 Intertoto Cup
6	Sion	10	0	1	9	8	27	−19	11	12	entered 1978 Intertoto Cup

Source: rsssf.com
Rules for classification: 1) Points; 2) Goal difference; 3) Goals scored;

==== Results ====
Home \ Away	BAS	GCZ	LS	SER	SIO	ZÜR
Basel		2–0	3–1	2–2	2–0	1–1
Grasshopper Club	4–2		0–0	1–1	4–1	1–0
Lausanne-Sports	1–1	4–3		1–2	6–1	4–0
Servette	0–2	0–0	1–1		1–0	1–2
Sion	1–4	1–1	1–2	1–2		0–1
Zürich	4–2	1–3	2–1	0–0	4–2	

Source: rsssf.com
Legend: Blue = home team win; Yellow = draw; Red = away team win.

=== Relegation play-out ===
Pos	Team	Pld	W	D	L	GF	GA	GD	BP	Pts	Qualification or relegation
1	Young Boys	10	4	5	1	20	13	+7	10	23	entered 1978 Intertoto Cup
2	Chênois	10	4	4	2	19	9	+10	9	21	
3	St. Gallen	10	3	6	1	11	7	+4	9	21	
4	Xamax	10	4	2	4	14	15	−1	10	20	
5	Étoile Carouge	10	4	3	3	13	12	+1	7	18	Relegated to 1978–79 Nationalliga B
6	Young Fellows Zürich	10	1	0	9	10	31	−21	2	4	Relegated to 1978–79 Nationalliga B

Source: rsssf.com
Rules for classification: 1) Points; 2) Goal difference; 3) Goals scored;

==== Results ====
Home \ Away	CHÊ	ÉTO	NX	STG	YB	YFZ
Chênois		1–2	2–0	0–0	2–2	4–0
Étoile Carouge	1–5		1–0	0–1	1–2	1–0
Neuchâtel Xamax	3–0	1–1		1–1	0–3	2–1
St. Gallen	0–0	0–0	2–1		2–2	3–0
Young Boys	0–0	1–1	1–2	2–2		3–1
Young Fellows	1–5	1–5	3–4	1–0	2–4	

Source: rsssf.com
Legend: Blue = home team win; Yellow = draw; Red = away team win.

== Nationalliga B ==
=== Teams, locations ===
Team	Town	Canton	Stadium	Capacity
FC Aarau	Aarau	Aargau	Stadion Brügglifeld	9,240
AC Bellinzona	Bellinzona	Ticino	Stadio Comunale Bellinzona	5,000
FC Biel-Bienne	Biel/Bienne	Bern	Stadion Gurzelen	15,000
FC Bulle	Bulle	Fribourg	Stade de Bouleyres	7,000
FC Chiasso	Chiasso	Ticino	Stadio Comunale Riva IV	4,000
FC Fribourg	Fribourg	Fribourg	Stade Universitaire	9,000
FC Gossau	Gossau	St. Gallen	Sportanlage Buechenwald	3,500
FC Grenchen	Grenchen	Solothurn	Stadium Brühl	15,100
SC Kriens	Kriens	Lucerne	Stadion Kleinfeld	5,100
FC La Chaux-de-Fonds	La Chaux-de-Fonds	Neuchâtel	Centre Sportif de la Charrière	12,700
FC Lugano	Lugano	Ticino	Cornaredo Stadium	6,330
FC Luzern	Lucerne	Lucerne	Stadion Allmend	25,000
FC Nordstern Basel	Basel	Basel-Stadt	Rankhof	7,600
Vevey-Sports	Vevey	Vaud	Stade de Copet	4,000
FC Wettingen	Wettingen	Aargau	Stadion Altenburg	10,000
FC Winterthur	Winterthur	Zürich	Schützenwiese	8,550

=== Final league table ===
Pos	Team	Pld	W	D	L	GF	GA	GD	Pts	Relegation
1	Nordstern Basel	30	18	9	3	69	23	+46	45	Champions promoted to 1978–79 Nationalliga A
2	Chiasso	30	18	9	3	70	30	+40	45	Promoted to 1978–79 Nationalliga A
3	Lugano	30	16	10	4	57	19	+38	42	
4	Biel-Bienne	30	15	6	9	37	30	+7	36	
5	Vevey-Sports	30	13	9	8	58	36	+22	35	
6	Winterthur	30	11	10	9	44	44	0	32	
7	Grenchen	30	10	8	12	45	45	0	28	
8	Kriens	30	11	6	13	38	58	−20	28	
9	Bellinzona	30	9	8	13	44	55	−11	26	
10	Fribourg	30	9	8	13	35	46	−11	26	
11	Aarau	30	11	4	15	44	67	−23	26	
12	Luzern	30	7	11	12	34	39	−5	25	
13	Wettingen	30	9	7	14	36	48	−12	25	
14	La Chaux-de-Fonds	30	7	9	14	44	56	−12	23	
15	Gossau	30	6	8	16	36	64	−28	20	Relegated to 1978–79 1. Liga
16	Bulle	30	6	6	18	37	68	−31	18	Relegated to 1978–79 1. Liga

Source: rsssf.com
Rules for classification: 1) Points; 2) Goal difference within the league, but decider play-off for qualifiers; 3) Goals scored;

== Further in Swiss football ==
- 1977–78 Swiss Cup
- 1977–78 Swiss 1. Liga

== Sources ==
- Switzerland 1977–78 at RSSSF

Preceded by 1976–77	Nationalliga seasons in Switzerland	Succeeded by 1978–79
