= Riccardo Rossini =

Italian footballer

Personal information
- Full name: Riccardo Rossini
- Date of birth: 8 November 1993 (age 33)
- Place of birth: Milan, Italy
- Height: 1.93 m (6 ft 4 in)
- Position: Midfielder

Team information
- Current team: Casale

Senior career*
Years	Team	Apps	(Gls)
–2010	Polisportiva Cimiano		
2010–2016	Giana Erminio	93	(16)
2012–2013	→ USD Tribiano (loan)	30	(8)
2016–2017	Piacenza	31	(3)
2017–2020	Rende	92	(14)
2020–2021	Giana Erminio	29	(0)
2021–2022	Casale	44	(8)
2023–	Varese	20	(2)
- * Club domestic league appearances and goals as of 28 May 2023

Riccardo Rossini (born 8 November 1993) is an Italian professional footballer who plays as a midfielder for Serie D club Casale.

== Club career ==
On 25 August 2021, Rossini joined to Serie D club Casale.
