= 1978–79 Nationalliga A =

Swiss football season

Nationalliga A
- Season: 1978–79
- Champions: Servette
- Relegated: Nordstern
- European Cup: Servette
- Cup Winners' Cup: Young Boys
- UEFA Cup: Zürich; Grasshopper Club
- Top goalscorer: Peter Risi (Zürich); 16 goals

Nationalliga B
- Season: 1978–79
- Champions: La Chaux-de-Fonds
- Promoted: La Chaux-de-Fonds; Luzern; Lugano
- Relegated: Etoile Carouge; Young Fellows
- Top goalscorer: n/a

The following is the summary of the Swiss National League in the 1978–79 football season, both Nationalliga A and Nationalliga B. This was the 82nd season of top-tier and the 81st season of second-tier football in Switzerland.

== Overview ==
The Swiss Football Association (ASF/SFV) had 28 members at this time. The clubs were divided into two tiers, the top tier Nationalliga A (NLA) with 12 teams and the second tier Nationalliga B (NLB) with 16. The format in both divisions was that the teams played a double round-robin to decide their table positions. Two points were awarded for a win and one point was awarded for a draw. Each club playing every other club twice (home and away), for a total of 22 rounds in the NLA and 30 rounds in the NLB.

In the NLA following this first qualification stage the division was divided in two, the top placed six teams then played a championship stage and the others in a relegation play-out. In both groups each team took half of the points gained in the first stage, rounded up to complete units, as bonus with them. They played a further double round-robin within the group. The Swiss champions would qualify for the 1979–80 European Cup, the runners-up and third placed team would qualify for the 1979–80 UEFA Cup.

In the following season the format was changed and both tiers would have 14 teams. Therefore, only one team from the NLA was relegated and the top three teams in the NLA were promoted. The bottom two teams in the NLB were relegated to the 1979–80 1. Liga.

== Nationalliga A ==
The first round of the NLA was played on 12 August 1978. There was a winter break between 3 December and 4 March 1979. The qualifying phase was completed by 8 April and the second phase took place between 21 April and 23 June 1997.

=== Teams, locations ===
Team	Town	Canton	Stadium	Capacity
FC Basel	Basel	Basel-Stadt	St. Jakob Stadium	36,800
CS Chênois	Thônex	Geneva	Stade des Trois-Chêne	8,000
FC Chiasso	Chiasso	Ticino	Stadio Comunale Riva IV	4,000
Grasshopper Club Zürich	Zürich	Zürich	Hardturm	20,000
FC Lausanne-Sport	Lausanne	Vaud	Pontaise	15,700
Neuchâtel Xamax FC	Neuchâtel	Neuchâtel	Stade de la Maladière	25,500
FC Nordstern Basel	Basel	Basel-Stadt	Rankhof	7,600
FC St. Gallen	St. Gallen	St. Gallen	Espenmoos	11,000
Servette FC	Geneva	Geneva	Stade des Charmilles	27,000
FC Sion	Sion	Valais	Stade de Tourbillon	16,000
BSC Young Boys	Bern	Bern	Wankdorf Stadium	56,000
FC Zürich	Zürich	Zürich	Letzigrund	25,000

=== Qualifying phase table ===
Pos	Team	Pld	W	D	L	GF	GA	GD	Pts	Qualification
1	FC Zürich	22	13	6	3	51	19	+32	32	To championship round
2	Servette FC	22	12	6	4	56	23	+33	30	To championship round
3	Grasshopper Club Zürich	22	9	9	4	35	24	+11	27	To championship round
4	FC Basel	22	10	6	6	36	29	+7	26	To championship round
5	BSC Young Boys	22	11	4	7	39	34	+5	26	To championship round
6	FC St. Gallen	22	11	4	7	34	34	0	26	To championship round
7	Neuchâtel Xamax	22	8	8	6	42	33	+9	24	To relegation play-out round
8	CS Chênois	22	9	4	9	30	32	−2	22	To relegation play-out round
9	Lausanne Sports	22	6	3	13	28	40	−12	15	To relegation play-out round
10	FC Chiasso	22	5	3	14	20	46	−26	13	To relegation play-out round
11	FC Nordstern Basel	22	2	8	12	19	44	−25	12	To relegation play-out round
12	FC Sion	22	3	5	14	20	52	−32	11	To relegation play-out round

Source: rsssf.com
Rules for classification: 1) Points; 2) Goal difference; 3) Goals scored;

==== Results ====
Home \ Away	BAS	CHÊ	CHI	GCZ	LS	NX	NOR	SER	SIO	STG	YB	ZÜR
Basel		2–1	4–0	3–2	2–0	5–2	1–1	4–1	2–0	4–2	2–2	1–0
Chênois	1–0		3–0	0–0	3–0	1–3	1–1	1–5	3–0	2–1	2–2	3–0
Chiasso	2–1	0–2		1–1	1–0	0–3	2–2	2–2	0–2	1–0	1–0	1–2
Grasshopper Club	2–1	1–0	4–0		3–0	2–2	3–1	0–0	2–1	2–3	2–2	2–1
Lausanne-Sports	0–1	1–4	4–3	2–0		0–2	2–0	1–2	4–2	1–2	0–1	1–2
Neuchâtel Xamax	2–0	2–0	4–2	0–0	2–2		2–1	0–3	8–0	1–1	0–1	0–2
Nordstern	1–1	0–0	2–1	1–1	1–2	1–1		0–5	1–2	2–4	1–2	0–1
Servette	6–0	5–1	4–0	0–0	1–1	2–2	4–0		2–0	4–1	2–0	1–1
Sion	0–0	1–1	0–3	2–4	0–1	2–2	1–1	1–5		0–1	4–1	2–2
St. Gallen	1–1	1–1	2–0	1–3	2–1	3–2	2–0	2–1	3–0		6–0	0–2
Young Boys	2–0	1–0	2–0	2–0	3–2	4–1	1–2	3–1	2–0	1–1		1–3
Zürich	1–1	6–0	2–0	1–1	3–3	1–1	5–0	3–0	4–0	5–0	4–1	

Legend: Blue = home team win; Yellow = draw; Red = away team win.

=== Championship group table ===
Pos	Team	Pld	W	D	L	GF	GA	GD	BP	Pts	Qualification
1	Servette	10	10	0	0	23	5	+18	15	35	Champions and Swiss Cup winners qualified for 1979–80 European Cup
2	Zürich	10	6	1	3	19	14	+5	16	29	qualified for 1979–80 UEFA Cup and entered 1979 Intertoto Cup
3	Grasshopper Club	10	3	3	4	11	13	−2	14	23	qualified for 1979–80 UEFA Cup and entered 1979 Intertoto Cup
4	St. Gallen	10	2	3	5	8	11	−3	13	20	entered 1978 Intertoto Cup
5	Young Boys	10	1	4	5	5	17	−12	13	19	Cup finalist qualified for 1979–80 European Cup Winners' Cup
6	Basel	10	2	1	7	18	24	−6	13	18	

Source: rsssf.com

==== Results ====
Home \ Away	BAS	GCZ	STG	SER	YB	ZÜR
Basel		2–3	2–0	1–4	6–0	1–3
Grasshopper Club	2–1		0–1	0–1	0–0	2–1
St. Gallen	4–1	0–0		0–1	1–1	1–2
Servette	2–0	3–1	2–0		4–1	1–0
Young Boys	2–2	1–0	0–0	0–2		0–1
Zürich	4–2	3–3	2–1	2–3	1–0	

Legend: Blue = home team win; Yellow = draw; Red = away team win.

=== Relegation play-out ===
Pos	Team	Pld	W	D	L	GF	GA	GD	BP	Pts	Relegation
1	CS Chênois	10	3	7	0	21	14	+7	11	24	entered 1978 Intertoto Cup
2	FC Sion	10	5	4	1	15	8	+7	6	20	
3	FC Chiasso	10	5	3	2	16	10	+6	7	20	
4	Lausanne Sports	10	5	2	3	20	16	+4	8	20	
5	Neuchâtel Xamax	10	2	1	7	11	19	−8	12	17	
6	FC Nordstern Basel	10	1	1	8	8	24	−16	6	9	Relegated to 1979–80 Nationalliga B

Source: rsssf.com
Rules for classification: 1) Points; 2) Goal difference; 3) Goals scored;

==== Results ====
Home \ Away	CHÊ	CHI	LS	NX	NOR	SIO
Chênois		1–0	3–3	6–3	3–1	1–1
Chiasso	1–1		3–1	3–1	2–0	2–0
Lausanne-Sports	2–4	2–0		1–0	4–0	1–2
Neuchâtel Xamax	1–0	1–1	1–2		2–3	0–2
Nordstern	1–1	2–3	1–2	0–2		0–3
Sion	1–1	1–1	2–2	1–0	2–0	

Legend: Blue = home team win; Yellow = draw; Red = away team win.

== Nationalliga B ==
=== Teams, locations ===
Team	Town	Canton	Stadium	Capacity
FC Aarau	Aarau	Aargau	Stadion Brügglifeld	9,240
AC Bellinzona	Bellinzona	Ticino	Stadio Comunale Bellinzona	5,000
FC Bern	Bern	Bern	Stadion Neufeld	14,000
FC Biel-Bienne	Biel/Bienne	Bern	Stadion Gurzelen	15,000
Étoile Carouge FC	Carouge	Geneva	Stade de la Fontenette	3,690
FC Frauenfeld	Frauenfeld	Thurgau	Kleine Allmend	6,370
FC Fribourg	Fribourg	Fribourg	Stade Universitaire	9,000
FC Grenchen	Grenchen	Solothurn	Stadium Brühl	15,100
SC Kriens	Kriens	Lucerne	Stadion Kleinfeld	5,100
FC La Chaux-de-Fonds	La Chaux-de-Fonds	Neuchâtel	Centre Sportif de la Charrière	12,700
Lugano	Lugano	Ticino	Cornaredo Stadium	6,330
Luzern	Lucerne	Lucerne	Stadion Allmend	25,000
Vevey-Sports	Vevey	Vaud	Stade de Copet	4,000
FC Wettingen	Wettingen	Aargau	Stadion Altenburg	10,000
FC Winterthur	Winterthur	Zürich	Schützenwiese	8,550
FC Young Fellows Zürich	Zürich	Zürich	Utogrund	2,850

=== Final league table ===
Pos	Team	Pld	W	D	L	GF	GA	GD	Pts	Relegation
1	FC La Chaux-de-Fonds	30	18	7	5	71	31	+40	43	Champions promoted to 1979–80 Nationalliga A
2	Luzern	30	17	9	4	62	36	+26	43	Promoted to 1979–80 Nationalliga A
3	FC Winterthur	30	16	9	5	58	32	+26	41	To promotion play-off
4	Lugano	30	17	7	6	51	31	+20	41	To promotion play-off
5	FC Frauenfeld	30	10	12	8	46	39	+7	32	
6	FC Aarau	30	12	8	10	44	39	+5	32	
7	FC Bern	30	11	10	9	41	41	0	32	
8	Vevey-Sports	30	11	6	13	47	41	+6	28	
9	FC Fribourg	30	9	9	12	37	33	+4	27	
10	AC Bellinzona	30	10	7	13	47	49	−2	27	
11	FC Grenchen	30	9	9	12	27	32	−5	27	
12	SC Kriens	30	10	7	13	38	48	−10	27	
13	FC Biel-Bienne	30	9	8	13	35	55	−20	26	
14	FC Wettingen	30	8	9	13	40	48	−8	25	
15	Etoile Carouge FC	30	5	11	14	42	53	−11	21	Relegated to 1979–80 1. Liga
16	FC Young Fellows Zürich	30	3	2	25	21	99	−78	8	Relegated to 1979–80 1. Liga

Source: rsssf.com
Rules for classification: 1) Points; 2) Goal difference within the league, but decider play-off for qualifiers; 3) Goals scored;

== Further in Swiss football ==
- 1978–79 Swiss Cup
- 1978–79 Swiss 1. Liga

== Sources ==
- Switzerland 1978–79 at RSSSF

Preceded by 1977–78	Nationalliga seasons in Switzerland	Succeeded by 1979–80
