= FC Herzogenbuchsee =

Swiss football club

- Nickname(s): FC Buchsi
- Founded: 1915
- Ground: Waldäcker
- Capacity: over 100
- League: 2. Liga

FC Herzogenbuchsee are a Swiss football club in Herzogenbuchsee. The club was founded in 1915. As of 2015, the club has nine teams, including a women's team. In the 1976–1977 season, FC Herzogenbuchsee was promoted to the top flight. As of 2025, FC Herzogenbuchsee's first men's team plays in the 2. Liga, the regionally-divided sixth tier of Swiss football.

FC Herzogenbuchsee has four pitches alongside the tracks of Rail 2000. Money from the SBB and commune provided during the rail construction allowed the club to renovate their facilities, making pitches popular among professionals in the area. However, one pitch was raised by excavated earth of unknown composition, making it unsuitable for playing football.
