= Jean-Christophe Thouvenel =

French footballer (born 1958)

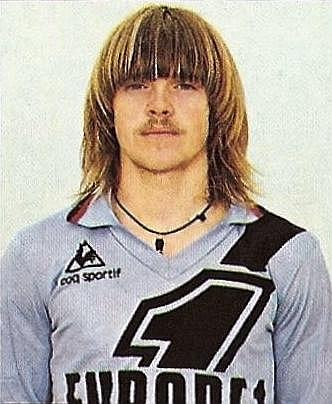
- Thouvenel in 1978

Personal information
- Date of birth: 8 October 1958 (age 68)
- Place of birth: Colmar, France
- Height: 1.73 m (5 ft 8 in)
- Position: Right-back

Senior career*
| Years | Team | Apps | (Gls) |
| 1975–1978 | Servette | 75 | (7) |
| 1978–1979 | Paris FC | 34 | (3) |
| 1979–1991 | Bordeaux | 390 | (3) |
| 1991–1993 | Le Havre | 62 | (0) |

International career
| 1983–1987 | France | 4 | (0) |
Medal record
Men's football
Representing France
| Gold medal – first place | 1984 Los Angeles | Team competition |
- * Club domestic league appearances and goals

Jean-Christophe Thouvenel (born 8 October 1958) is a French former professional footballer who played as a right-back. He was a member of the French squad that won the gold medal at the 1984 Summer Olympics in Los Angeles, California.

== Honours ==
Servette

- Swiss Cup: 1977–78

Bordeaux

- French Division 1: 1983–84, 1984–85, 1986–87
- Coupe de France: 1985–86, 1986–87
