= FC Mendrisio =

Swiss football club

- Full name: Football Club Mendrisio
- Founded: 1924; 102 years ago
- Ground: Centro Sportivo Comunale
- Capacity: 4,260
- Chairman: Sebastiano Pellegrini
- Manager: Amedeo Stefani
- League: 1. Liga Classic
- 2024–25: Group 3, 14th of 16
- Website: https://www.fcmendrisio.ch/
Home colours	Away colours

FC Mendrisio is a football club from Mendrisio, Switzerland. The team currently play in 1. Liga Classic, the fourth tier of Swiss football.

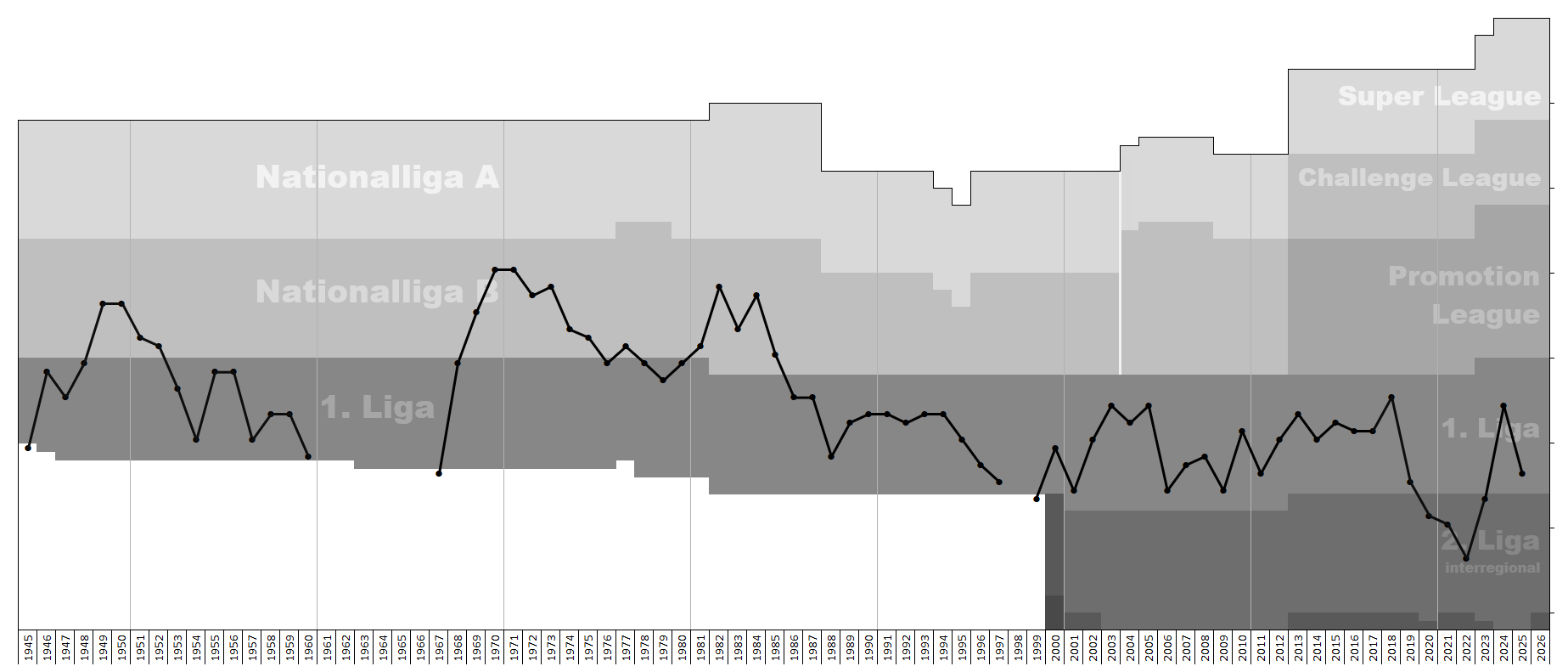
Chart of FC Mendrisio table positions in the Swiss football league system

== History ==
The club was founded in 1924.

== Current squad ==
As of 6 April, 2026 Note: Flags indicate national team as defined under FIFA eligibility rules; some limited exceptions apply. Players may hold more than one non-FIFA nationality.

No.	Pos.	Nation	Player
1	GK	SUI	Ulisse Pelloni
3	DF	ITA	Alessio Calacoci
4	DF	ITA	Moris Sportelli
5	DF	ALB	Xhulio Alushaj
6	MF	SUI	Fabio Moor
7	FW	ITA	Andreas Becchio
9	FW	SUI	Samuele Lago Mille
10	FW	SUI	Salvatore Guarino
11	FW	ITA	Stefano Gibellini
12	DF	SUI	Noel Kabamba
14	DF	ITA	Matteo Dubini
15	MF	ITA	Vittorio Vitulli

No.	Pos.	Nation	Player
16	MF	ITA	Giona Pettenuzzo
18	MF	SUI	Antoine Rey
19	DF	ITA	Fabio Brancher
21	DF	ITA	Alex Okaingni
22	MF	SUI	Axel De Biasi
23	MF	ITA	Riccardo Rossini
24	DF	SUI	Oliver Sarenac
25	MF	SUI	Alessandro Martinelli
26	GK	BEN	Abdel Moussa
27	DF	ITA	Matteo Lape
49	FW	COD	Ruben Bakwetila
