= SV Muttenz =

Swiss football club

Muttenz
- Full name: Sportverein Muttenz
- Founded: 1 January 1921; 104 years ago
- Ground: Sportplatz Margelacker; Muttenz
- Capacity: 3,200
- Chairman: Hans-Beat Rohr
- Manager: Peter Schädler
- League: 1. Liga Classic
- 2024–25: Group 2, 13th of 16
Home colours	Away colours

Sportverein Muttenz, is a football club from Muttenz, Switzerland. The team currently playing in the 1. Liga Classic, the fourth tier of Swiss football.

== History ==
SV Muttenz was founded in 1921.

== Current squad ==
Note: Flags indicate national team as defined under FIFA eligibility rules; some limited exceptions apply. Players may hold more than one non-FIFA nationality.

No.	Pos.	Nation	Player
1	GK	SUI	Steven Oberle
2	DF	BRA	Alois Ribeiro
3	DF	SUI	Marc Tanner
4	MF	SUI	David Erbacher
5	DF	SUI	Pascal Bieri
6	MF	SUI	Onur Akbulut
7	MF	SUI	Daniele Zanfrini
8	FW	ALB	Artan Shillova
9	MF	KOS	Sokol Salihi
10	MF	SUI	Manuel Jenny
11	DF	SUI	Tobias Sander
12	DF	SUI	Loris Minnig

No.	Pos.	Nation	Player
13	MF	BRA	Gleison
14	FW	SUI	Timo Grütter
15	DF	SUI	Pascal Alig
16	DF	HUN	Marek Balogh
17	MF	SUI	Ermir Amiti
18	MF	LIE	Thomas Eggenberger
19	FW	SRB	Milos Milutinovic
20	FW	SUI	Sven Jegge
21	FW	SUI	Thibault Constantin
22	MF	TUR	Cüneyt Eksi
26	DF	TUR	Serhat Kurt
29	GK	SUI	Dominik Kurt
