= FC Köniz =

Swiss football club

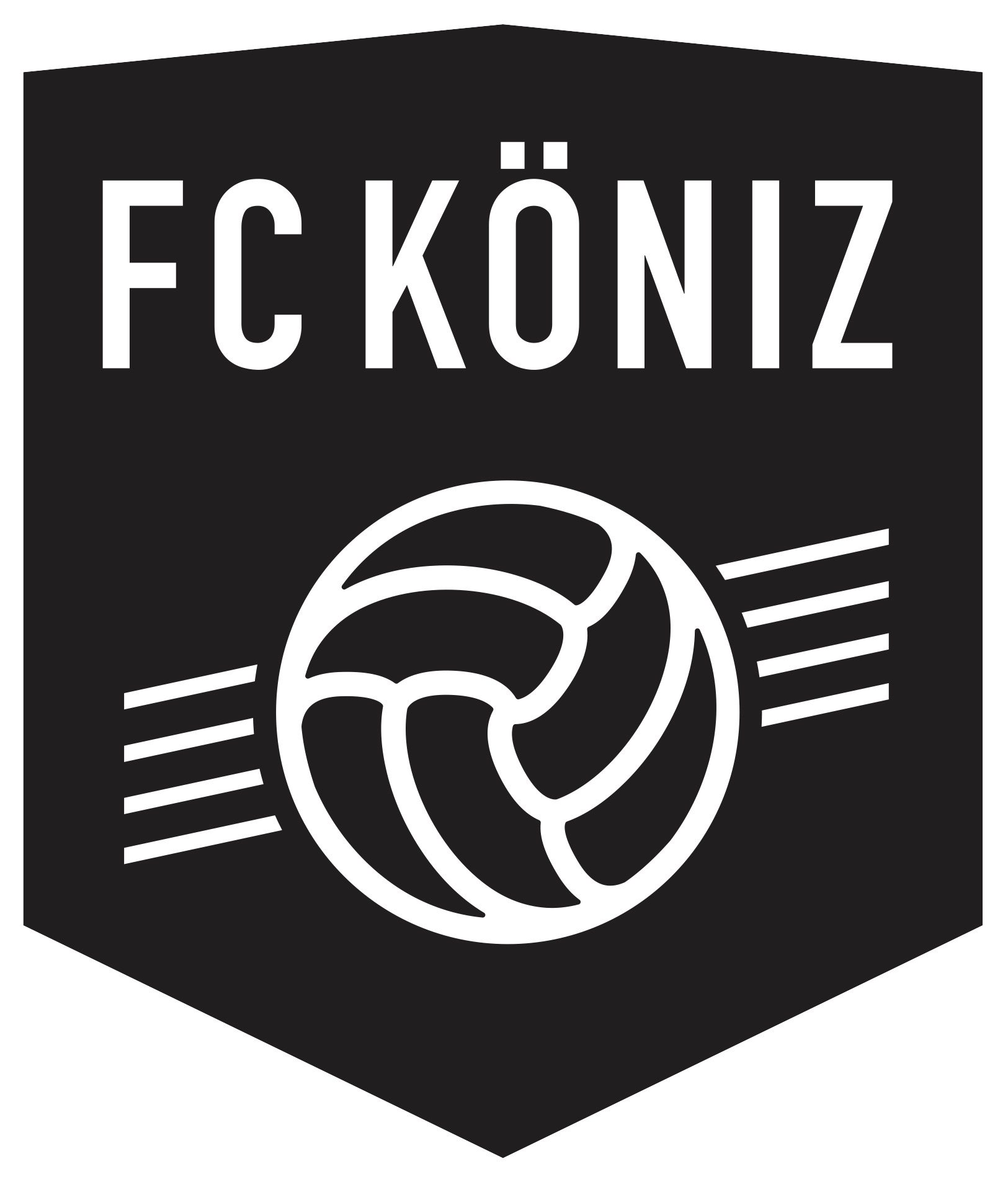
- Full name: Fussball Club Köniz
- Founded: 1933
- Ground: Sportplatz Liebefeld-Hessgut, Köniz
- Capacity: 2,600
- Chairman: Bernard Pulver
- Manager: Gabriel Urdaneta
- League: Swiss Promotion League
Home colours	Away colours

FC Köniz are a football team from Köniz, Switzerland, is currently playing in the Swiss Promotion League. The club was founded in 1933, with the recorded founding being 1 July 1933, and after originally playing in the lower tiers of Swiss football, were promoted to the Promotion League in 2013.

== Current squad ==
Note: Flags indicate national team as defined under FIFA eligibility rules; some limited exceptions apply. Players may hold more than one non-FIFA nationality.

No.	Pos.	Nation	Player
1	GK	SUI	Remo Kilchhofer
2	DF	SUI	Marco Stauffiger
5	DF	ENG	Granit Islami
6	MF	SUI	Jon Vula
7	MF	SUI	Dennis Wyder
8	MF	KOS	Alban Mulaj
9	FW	COD	Ewembe Lokwa
10	FW	MKD	Ylber Mejdi
11	MF	TUR	Hüseyin Tükenmez
15	FW	MKD	Antonio Lukarov
20	GK	SUI	Lars Schädeli
21	MF	SRB	David Drincic
22	DF	BIH	Marko Kuzmanovic

No.	Pos.	Nation	Player
23	MF	SUI	Arxhend Cani
24	DF	SUI	Fabrice Suter
27	DF	SUI	Lorin Wyss
31	DF	SUI	Stefan Glarner
33	MF	SUI	Domenico Pena
34	MF	SUI	Drin Budakova
37	MF	SUI	Stephan Andrist
43	MF	SEN	Mar Ba
70	FW	POR	Joel Costa
77	MF	SUI	Evan Melo
88	GK	SUI	Aldin Crnovrsanin
90	DF	SUI	Stefan Jovanovic
99	FW	SUI	Haris Samardžić
