= FC Ibach =

Swiss football club

- Full name: Fussball Club Ibach
- Founded: 1954; 71 years ago
- Ground: Gerbihof, Ibach
- Capacity: 3,300
- Chairman: Ralph Gwerder
- Coach: Marco Spiess
- League: 2. Liga Interregional
- 2024–25: Group 3, 13th of 16

Fussball Club Ibach are a Swiss football team based in Ibach, canton of Schwyz. The team currently plays in 2. Liga Interregional, the fifth tier in the Swiss football pyramid.

== History ==
FC Ibach was formed in 1954.

== Staff and board members ==
- Trainer: Marco Spiess
