= FC Laufen =

Swiss football club

- Full name: Football Club Laufen
- Founded: 1908
- Stadium: Nau
- Capacity: 5000
- Manager: Shtjefen Frrokaj
- League: 3. Liga
- Website: https://club.football.ch/de/club/teams/team/kader/&v=519&t=32313
Home colours	Away colours

Football Club Laufen, is a football club from Laufen, Switzerland.

The club was founded in 1908, is currently playing in the 3. Liga.
