= 1978–79 Swiss League Cup =

Tournament details
- Country: Switzerland
- Teams: 32

Final positions
- Champions: Servette
- Runners-up: Basel

Tournament statistics
- Matches played: 43

The 1978–79 Swiss League Cup was the seventh edidition of the Swiss League Cup competition since its introduction in 1972. The first and second rounds were played in summer 1978 as a pre-season warm-up to the 1978–79 Swiss football season, the later rounds were played after the winter-break.

== Overview ==
The League Cup had been created six seasons earlier to allow clubs from the top two tiers to compete in a tournament in advance of the league season, with the semi-finals and final played in the Autumn. However, this planning was given up and modified. This season the first two rounds were played in advance of the season and the later rounds were played in the second half of the league season. This year the format was also modified, the first round was played as a two legged affair, however, the teams that competed in the 1978 Intertoto Cup played only a single tie, which was held on a neutral ground. In the remainder of the competition, the matches were played in a single knockout format.

In the event of a draw after 90 minutes, the match went into extra time. In the event of a draw at the end of extra time, a penalty shoot-out was to decide which team qualified for the next round. No replays were foreseen.

== First round ==
=== Summary ===
The first legs were played on 22 July and the return legs were played on 29 July 1978.

Team 1	Agg.	Team 2	1st leg	2nd leg
Lugano	1–3	St. Gallen	1–2	0–1
Kriens	0–6	Chiasso	0–2	0–4
Fribourg	0–5	Lausanne-Sport	0–1	0–4
FC Bern	1–6	Xamax	0–3	1–3
Vevey-Sports	2–8	La Chaux-de-Fonds	1–1	1–7
Servette	7–4	Étoile Carouge	4–0	3–4
Wettingen	1–0	Aarau	1–0	0–0
Biel-Bienne	0–7	Chênois	0–2	0–5
Frauenfeld	1–3	Winterthur	1–1	0–2
Bellinzona	4–6	Luzern	3–2	1–4
Basel	4–3	Grenchen	2–0	2–3
Young Fellows Zürich	1–7	Nordstern Basel	1–3	0–4 *

- The match Nordstern–Young Fellows was played 1 August.

The one legged ties were all played in Oerlikon.

Team 1	Score	Team 2
26 July 1978
FC Unterstrass (Zürich)	1–8	Grasshopper Club
27 July 1978
Ibach	2–6	Zürich
2 August 1978
FC Raron	0–6	Sion
3 August 1978
FC Lerchenfeld (Thun)	1–3	Young Boys

=== Matches ===
Two legged ties

22 July 1978
First leg

Servette	4–0	Étoile Carouge
Schnyder (1:0); Pfister (2:0); Guyot (3:0); Hamberg (4:0)	Servette summary

Charmilles Stadium, Geneva

29 July 1978
Second leg

Étoile Carouge	4–3	Servette
Rieder 20' (1:1); Mouny 32' (2:1); Bussard 64' (3:2); Ducommun 80' (4:2)	Servette summary	11' (0:1) Elia; 35' (2:1) Elia; 86' (4:3) Peterhans

Stade de la Fontenette, Carouge

Servette won 7–4 on aggregate.

22 July 1978
First leg

Wettingen	1–0	Aarau
Läuppi 3' (1:0)	FCA summary

Stadion Altenburg, Wettingen

29 July 1978
Second leg

Aarau	0–0	Wettingen
	FCA summary

Stadion Brügglifeld, Aarau

Wettingen won 1–0 on aggregate.

22 July 1978
18:30
First leg

Basel	2–0	Grenchen
Siegenthaler 24' (1:0); Maissen 56' (2:0)	FCB summary

St. Jakob Stadium, Basel
Attendance: 900
Referee: (Switzerland) Bruno Burgener (Kriens)

29 July 1978
19:00
Second leg

Grenchen	3–2	Basel
Wirth 43' (1:1); Albanese 51' (2:1); Huser 80' (3:2)	FCB summary	14' (0:1) Stohler; 57' (2:2) Baldinger

Stadium Brühl, Grenchen
Attendance: 900
Referee: (Switzerland) Gerald Corminboeuf

Basel won 4–3 on aggregate.

One legged ties

26 July 1978

FC Unterstrass	1–8	Grasshopper Club
Gusset 61' (1:5)	RSSSF summary	14' (0:1) Sulser; 16' (0:2) Bauer; 27' (0:3) Wehrli; 45' (0:4) Wehrli; 56' (0:5) Traber; 63' (1:6) Egli; 64' (1:7) Wehrli; 83' (1:8) Hey

Neudorf, Zürich
Attendance: 1,300
Referee: (Switzerland) Franz Gächter (Suhr, Aargau)

26 July 1978

Ibach	2–6	Zürich
Suter 58' (1:4); Schibig 74' (pen. 2:6)	FCZ summary	20' (1:0) Scheiwiler; 26' (0:2) Botteron; 28' (pen- 0:3) Risi; 36' (o.g.) (Suter); 61' (1:5) Jerković; 67' (1:6) Aliesch; (yellow card) Fischbach; (yellow card) Kundert

Gerbihof, Ibach
Attendance: 1,200
Referee: Marco Raveglia (San Vittore, Switzerland)

3 August 1978

FC Lerchenfeld	1–3	Young Boys
Walther 11' (1:1)	YB summary	5' (0:1) Odermatt; 65' (1:2) Zwahlen; 69' (1:3) Küttel

Sportanlagen Waldeck, Thun
Attendance: 1,800
Referee: (Switzerland) Aschwanden

== Second round ==
=== Summary ===
Team 1	Score	Team 2
5 August 1978
Young Boys	1–1 (a.e.t.) (4–1 p)	St. Gallen
Chiasso	0–1	Grasshopper Club
Lausanne-Sport	2–3	Xamax
La Chaux-de-Fonds	0–1	Servette
Wettingen	0–5	Zürich
Chênois	2–1	Sion
Winterthur	0–2	Luzern
4 October 1978
Basel	1–0	Nordstern Basel

=== Matches ===
5 August 1978

Young Boys	1–1 (a.e.t.)	St. Gallen
Zwygart 40' (pen. 1:0); Rebmann (yellow card) 70'	YB summary	51' (1:1) Stöckl
Penalties
Zwygart (penalty scored); Odermatt (penalty scored); Brechbühl (penalty scored); Müller (penalty scored)	4–1	(penalty missed) Brander; (penalty scored) Stöckl; (penalty missed) Locher

Wankdorf Stadium, Bern
Attendance: 2,200
Referee: (Switzerland) Bruno Burgener (Kriens)

5 August 1978

Chiasso	0–1	Grasshopper Club
	RSSSF summary	70' (0:1) Egli

Stadio Comunale Riva IV, Chiasso
Attendance: 3,000
Referee: Jean-Marie Macheret (Rueyres, Switzerland)

5 August 1978

La Chaux-de-Fonds	0–1	Servette
	Servette summary	16' (0:1) Schnyder

Stade Charrière, La Chaux-de-Fonds
Attendance: 3,000
Referee: (Switzerland) Franz Gächter (Suhr, Aargau)

5 August 1978

Wettingen	0–5	Zürich
Strasser (penalty missed) 65′	FCZ summary	39' (0:1) Baur; 62' (0:2) Risi; 65' (0:3) Zwicker; 75' (0:4) Zwicker; 82' (pen.) Botteron

Stadion Altenburg, Wettingen
Attendance: 2,300
Referee: (Switzerland) André Daina (Éclépens)

4 October 1978

Basel	1–0	Nordstern Basel
Stohler (penalty missed) 52′ Schönenberger 79' (1:0)	FCB summary

St. Jakob Stadium, Basel
Attendance: 6,600
Referee: (Switzerland) Denis Perrenoud

== Quarter-finals ==
=== Summary ===
Team 1	Score	Team 2
11 November 1978
Basel	1–0	Luzern
Xamax	3–1	Zürich
Chênois	2–4	Servette
Grasshopper Club	5–3	Young Boys

=== Matches ===
11 November 1978
15:00

Basel	3–1	Luzern
Demarmels 42' (1:0); Marti 52' (2:0); Baldinger 54' (3:0)	FCB summary	66' (pen. 3:1) Christen

St. Jakob Stadium, Basel
Attendance: 1,400
Referee: (Switzerland) Werner Bösch

11 November 1978

Xamax	3–1	Zürich
Zaugg 49' (1:1); Gross 51' (2:1); Rub 88' (3:1)	FCZ summary	39' (0:1) Risi

Stade de la Maladière (1924), Neuchâtel
Attendance: 2,000
Referee: (Switzerland) Gottlieb Barmettler (Luzern)

11 November 1978

Chênois	2–4	Servette
Tachet 37' (1:1); Seramondi 80' (o.g.)	Servette summary	18' (0:1) Pfister; 58' (1:2) Hamberg; 61' (1:3) Schnyder; 65' (1:4) Schnyder

Stade des Trois-Chêne, Thônex

11 November 1978

Grasshopper Club	5–3	Young Boys
Hermann 21' (1:0); Müller 65' (o.g.); Sulser 72' (3:2); Ponte 76' (pen.); Meyer 80' (5:3)	YB summary	25' (1:1) Hußner; 28' (1:2) Hußner; 74' (pen.) Odermatt

Hardturm, Zürich
Attendance: 2,600
Referee: (Switzerland) Franz Gächter (Suhr, Aargau)

== Semi-finals ==
=== Summary ===
Team 1	Score	Team 2
24 January 1979
Xamax	0–2	Basel
25 January 1979
Servette	3–1 (a.e.t.)	Grasshopper Club

=== Matches ===
24 February 1979
15:00

Xamax	0–2	Basel
	FCB summary	40' (0:1) Baldinger; 66' Schönenberger

Stade de la Maladière (1924), Neuchâtel
Attendance: 1,150
Referee: (Switzerland) Hans Wolfer

25 February 1979

Servette	3–1 (a.e.t.)	Grasshopper Club
Peterhans 94' (1:0); Bizzini 110' (2:1); Elia 120' (3:1)	Servette summary	101' (1:1) Egli

Charmilles Stadium, Geneva

== Final ==
The final was held at the St. Jakob Stadium in Basel on 1 May 1979.

=== Summary ===
Team 1	Score	Team 2
1 May 1979
Servette	2–2 (a.e.t.) (4–3 p)	Basel

=== Telegram ===
1 May 1979
19:00

Servette	2–2 (a.e.t.)	Basel
Peterhans 5'; Barberis 37'	FCB summary	18', 87' Schönenberger
Penalties
Schnyder (penalty scored); Barberis (penalty scored); Guyot (penalty missed); Trinchero (penalty scored); Engel (penalty scored)	4–3	(penalty scored) Stohler; (penalty scored) Maradan; (penalty missed) Schönenberger; (penalty scored) von Wartburg; (penalty missed) Tanner

St. Jakob Stadium, Basel
Attendance: 8,500
Referee: (Switzerland)

Servette won the cup and this was the club's second consecutive League Cup title.

== Further in Swiss football ==
- 1978–79 Nationalliga A
- 1978–79 Swiss 1. Liga
- 1978–79 Swiss Cup
