= 1977–78 FC Basel season =

FC Basel
1977–78 season
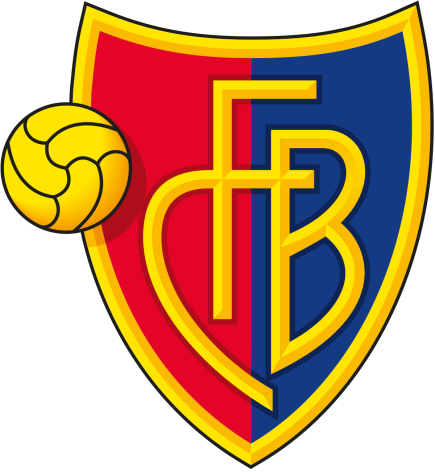
- Chairman: René Theler
- Manager: Helmut Benthaus
- Ground: St. Jakob Stadium, Basel
- Nationalliga A: Qualifying phase 4th of 12
- Championship 3rd of 6
- Swiss Cup: Semi-final
- Swiss League Cup: Semi-final
- European Cup: Round 1
- Coppa delle Alpi: Group stage
- Top goalscorer: League: Roland Schönenberger (16); All: Roland Schönenberger (24)
- Highest home attendance: 21,500 on 22 April 1978 vs Grasshopper Club
- Lowest home attendance: 3,500 on 5 November 1977 vs Etoile Carouge
- Average home league attendance: 9,062

The Fussball Club Basel 1893 1977–78 season was their 84th season since the club was founded. It was their 32nd consecutive season in the top flight of Swiss football after they won promotion during the season 1945–46. They played their home games in the St. Jakob Stadium. René Theler was voted as club chairman at the AGM. This was Theler's second period as chairman.

== Overview ==
=== Pre-season ===
Helmut Benthaus was first team manager for the thirteenth consecutive season. During the off-season there were only two changes in the squad. Goalkeeper Hans Küng joined from Xamax and Hansruedi Schär joined from lower tier FC Oensingen. All other mutations were internal between the first team and the reserves. Basel played a total of 54 games in their 1977–78 season. 32 in the domestic league, four in the Swiss Cup, four in the Swiss League Cup, two in the European Cup, four in the Cup of the Alps and eight were friendly matches. The team scored a total of 125 goals and conceded 88. Roland Schönenberger was the team's overall top goal scorer with 26 goals, Detlev Lauscher and Erni Maissen each netted 15 times.

=== Domestic league ===
Basel played in the 1977–78 Nationalliga A. This was contested by the first 10 teams from the previous season and the two newly promoted teams Etoile Carouge and Young Fellows Zürich. The champions would qualify for the 1978–79 European Cup and the Swiss Cup winners would qualify for 1978–79 Cup Winners' Cup. The UEFA modified the entry rules for Switzerland again and, therefore, this season only two teams would qualify for the 1977–78 UEFA Cup. Due to the fact that Basel were reigning champions and because there were only minor mutations in the squad, the club's primary aim was to defend their championship title. The Nationalliga A was played in two stages. The qualification phase was played by all 12 teams in a double round robin, and after completion of this stage, the teams were divided into two groups. The first six teams contended in the championship group (with half the obtained points in the first stage as bonus) and the positions seventh to twelfth contended the relegation group (also with half the obtained points as bonus). Basel ended the qualification round in fourth position and ended the championship group in third position with 27 points, two points behind Grasshopper Club and one behind Servette. They failed their championship aim, being beaten 2–4 by the Grasshoppers in the very last game of the season.

Basel scored a total of 74 goals conceding 48 in their 32 domestic league games. Roland Schönenberger was the team's top goal scorer with 16 league goals. Detlev Lauscher, Erni Maissen and Jörg Stohler each scored 9 goals.

=== Swiss Cup and League Cup ===
In the first round of the Swiss Cup Basel were drawn against third-tier FC Lerchenfeld (Thun) and this was the first time that these two clubs had ever played against each other. Basel won this away game 4–2. In the next round they beat Zürich away 3–1 and St. Gallen at home 4–1 in the quarter-final. Therefore Basel advanced to the semi-finals before being knocked out of the competition by Grasshopper Club. Servette won the competition this season. In the first round of the Swiss League Cup Basel were drawn against Wettingen. Also in this competition Basel advanced to the semi-finals before being knocked out. St. Gallen won the competition beating Grasshopper Club 3–2 in the final.

=== European Cup and Coppa delle Alpi ===
As reigning Swiss champions Basel were qualified for the 1977–78 European Cup and in the first round they were drawn against Austrian champions FC Wacker Innsbruck. After a home defeat and an away win, this competition was concluded after the first round, Wacker won 3–2 on aggregate. In the Coppa delle Alpi Basel played in group B together with Bastia, Olympique Lyonnais and Lausanne-Sport. But with only one win and three defeats they ended the group stage in last position in the table.

== Players ==
Note: Flags indicate national team as defined under FIFA eligibility rules; some limited exceptions apply. Players may hold more than one non-FIFA nationality.

No.	Pos.	Nation	Player
1	GK	SUI	Hans Küng (from Xamax)
2	DF	SUI	Walter Geisser
3	DF	SUI	Walter Mundschin
4	DF	SUI	Peter Ramseier
5	DF	SUI	Paul Fischli
6	MF	SUI	Otto Demarmels
7	FW	SUI	Peter Marti
8	MF	SUI	Markus Tanner
9	FW	SUI	Serge Muhmenthaler
10	FW	DEN	Eigil Nielsen
11	FW	GER	Detlev Lauscher

No.	Pos.	Nation	Player
12	MF	SUI	Jean-Pierre Maradan
13	FW	SUI	Roland Schönenberger
14	DF	SUI	Jörg Stohler
15	MF	SUI	Rolf Bucher
16	MF	SUI	Hansruedi Schär (from FC Oensingen)
17	MF	SUI	Arthur von Wartburg
18	MF	SUI	Erni Maissen
22	GK	SUI	Hans Müller
—	GK	SUI	Jürg Wenger
—	MF	SUI	Silvan Corbat
—	DF	SUI	Alex Wirth (reserves)

Players who left the squad

Note: Flags indicate national team as defined under FIFA eligibility rules; some limited exceptions apply. Players may hold more than one non-FIFA nationality.

No.	Pos.	Nation	Player
—	GK	SUI	Thomas Manger (reserves)

No.	Pos.	Nation	Player
—	GK	SUI	Felix Wälchli (reserves)
—	DF	SUI	Markus Just (reserves)

== Results ==
Legend

Win Draw Loss Postponed

=== Friendly matches ===
==== Pre- and mid-season ====
1977 Pre-season	Singapore	2–3	(Switzerland) Basel	Singapore
	Goal	Summary	Goal

1 August 1977 Pre-season	Basel (Switzerland)	2–0	(Switzerland) Aarau	Buschweilerhof, Basel
17:30	Schär 35' (1:0); Lauscher (2:0)	Summary

4 August 1977 Uhrencup	Basel (Switzerland)	4–1	(Switzerland) Biel-Bienne	Stadion Brühl, Grenchen
17:00	Maissen 26' (1:0); Muhmenthaler 55' (2:1); Maissen 81' (3:1); Maissen 85' (4:1)	Summary	40' (1:1) Tocchini	Attendance: 1,700; Referee: (Switzerland) Alfred Heinis

10 August 1977 Uhrencup	Xamax (Switzerland)	6–1	(Switzerland) Basel	Stadion Brühl, Grenchen
20:30	Elsig 18' (1:1); Elsig 37' (2:1); Rub 42' (3:1); Rub 45' (4:1); Küffer 80' (5:1); Claude 88' (6:1)	Summary	10' (0:1) Lauscher	Attendance: 4,000; Referee: (Switzerland) Peter Scherz (Aegerten)

==== Winter break ====
28 January 1978 Winter break	Winterthur (Switzerland)	1–1	(Switzerland) Basel	Schützenwiese, Winterthur
	Lüthi 11' (1:1)	Summary	9' (0:1) Maissen	Attendance: 300; Referee: (Switzerland) Franz Gächter

1 February 1978 Winter break	Basel (Switzerland)	0–0	(Switzerland) Young Fellows Zürich	Landhof, Basel
16:00		Summary		Attendance: 200; Referee: (Switzerland) Kurt Fuchs Basel

5 February 1978 Winter break	Nordstern Basel (Switzerland)	0–6	(Switzerland) Basel	Stadion Rankhof, Basel
		Summary	21' (0:1) Schönenberger; 35' (0:2) Marti; 51' (0:3) Stohler; 65' (0:4) Marti; 77' (0:5) Stohler; 82' (0:6) Schönenberger	Attendance: 800

19 February 1978 Winter break	Basel (Switzerland)	3–1	(Switzerland) Concordia Basel	St. Jakob Stadium, Basel
14:30	Maissen (1x); Schär (1x); Stohler (1x)	Summary	(1x)	Referee: (Switzerland) Triulzi Basel

=== Nationalliga ===
==== Qualifying phase matches ====
13 August 1977 Round 1	Basel	3–1	Chênois	St. Jakob Stadium, Basel
20:00	Ramseier 43' (1:1); Stohler 45' (pen. 2:1); Nielsen 81' (3:1); Maissen (yellow card)	Summary	14' (0:1) Yaghcha	Attendance: 6,000; Referee: (Switzerland) Otto Isler (Zürich)

20 August 1977 Round 2	Etoile Carouge	1–0	Basel	Stade de la Fontenette, Carouge
20:30	Meier 5' (1:0); Zapico (yellow card)	Summary	(yellow card) Lauscher	Attendance: 6,000; Referee: (Switzerland) Jean-Marie Macheret, (Rueyres-St-Laurent)

23 August 1977 Round 3	Grasshopper Club	0–1	Basel	Hardturm, Zürich
20:00	Ponte (yellow card)	Summary	46' (0:1) Schönenberger; (yellow card) Tanner	Attendance: 10,300; Referee: (Switzerland) André Daina (Éclépens)

27 August 1977 Round 4	Basel	5–0	Young Fellows Zürich	St. Jakob Stadium, Basel
20:00	Nielsen 26' (1:0); Nielsen 62' (2:0); Stohler 71' (3:0); Stohler 81' (pen. 4:0); Marti 86' (5:0); Mundschin (yellow card)	Summary		Attendance: 4,000; Referee: (Switzerland) Werner Bösch (Sutz-Lattrigen)

30 September 1977 Round 5	Xamax	2–5	Basel	Stade de la Maladière (1924), Neuchâtel
20:15	Osterwalder 21' (1:0); Elsig 73' (2:4); Hasler (yellow card)	Summary	28' (pen. 1:1) Stohler; 43' (1:2) Stohler; 46' (1:3) Schönenberger; 67' (1:1) Nielsen; 87' (2:5) Lauscher; (yellow card) Mundschin; (yellow card) Schönenberger; (yellow card) Nielsen	Attendance: 6,900; Referee: (Switzerland) Peter Scherz (Aegerten)

17 September 1977 Round 6	Basel	2–2	Zürich	St. Jakob Stadium, Basel
20:00	Mundschin 6' (1:0); Maissen 64' (2:2)	FCZ summary FCB summary	32' (1:1) Moser; 40' (1:2) Cucinotta; (yellow card) 68' Baur; (yellow card) 90' Grob	Attendance: 12,500; Referee: (Switzerland) Gérard Racine (La Neuveville, Biel/Bienne)
Note: Basel without Fischli (injured) and Muhmenthaler (reserves). Zurich without Fischbach, Heer, and Stierli (injured). Sport, 19.9.1977: «57th minute: an FCZ fan threw a firework onto the pitch in the Basel penalty area and he was taken away». 65th minute: Maradan was injured and from then on only plays a supporting role. An hour after the game ended, hundreds of FCB fans were still besieging the grandstand entrance and demonstrating against the referee, who left the stadium through a side entrance.

24 September 1977 Round 7	Servette	2–0	Basel	Charmilles Stadium, Geneva
17:00	Chivers 14' (1:0); Andrey 78' (2:0)	FCB summary		Attendance: 10,500; Referee: (Switzerland) Peter Kellenberger
Note: Corners 5:5.

1 October 1977 Round 8	Basel	0–0	Young Boys	St. Jakob Stadium, Basel
20:00		FCB summary	(yellow card) 59' Eichenberger	Attendance: 6,000; Referee: (Switzerland) Bruno Galler (Kirchdorf, Bern)
Note: Corner 14:1.

8 October 1977 Round 9	Basel	4–2	St. Gallen	St. Jakob Stadium, Basel
20:00	Schönenberger 40' (1:1); Demarmels 44' (2:1); Schönenberger 70' (3:2); Schönenberger 72' (4:2)	Summary	16' (0:1) Müller; 46' (2:2) Müller; (yellow card) Stöckl	Attendance: 5,500; Referee: (Switzerland) André Favre (Échallens)

15 October 1977 Round 10	Sion	4–1	Basel	Stade Tourbillon, Sion
20:15	Lusier 1' (1:0); Coutaz 49' (2:0); Coutaz 51' (3:0); Sarrasin 87' (4:1)	FCB summary	79' (3:1) Marti	Attendance: 7,500; Referee: (Switzerland) Jakob Baumann (Schaffhausen)

22 October 1977 Round 11	Basel	1–4	Lausanne-Sport	St. Jakob Stadium, Basel
20:15	Lauscher 37' (1:0); Lauscher (yellow card)	Summary	41' (1:1) Guillaume; 47' (1:2) Künzli; 65' (1:3) Guillaume; 73' (1:4) Künzli	Attendance: 10,000; Referee: (Switzerland) René Maire (Chêne-Bougeries, Genève)

26 October 1977 Round 12	Chênois	2–0	Basel	Stade des Trois-Chêne, Thônex
20:00	Tachet 20' (1:0); Duvillad 53' (2:0)	Summary		Attendance: 2,800; Referee: (Switzerland) Jean Dubach (Nidau)

5 November 1977 Round 13	Basel	4–0	Etoile Carouge	St. Jakob Stadium, Basel
17:30	Nielsen 27' (1:0); Lauscher 55' (2:0); Schönenberger 83' (3:0); Demarmels 88' (4:0)	Summary	(yellow card) Pont	Attendance: 3,500; Referee: (Switzerland) Bruno Galler (Kirchdorf, Bern)

12 November 1977 Round 14	Young Fellows Zürich	1–4	Basel	Stadion Brügglifeld, Aarau
17:30	Stomeo 89' (1:4)	Summary	14' (0:1) Schönenberger; 15' (0:2) Maissen; 72' (0:3) Maissen; 88' (0:4) Marti	Attendance: 4,000; Referee: (Switzerland) Walter Hungerbühler (St. Gallen)

19 November 1977 Round 15	Basel	6–1	Xamax	St. Jakob Stadium, Basel
17:30	Maissen 5' (1:0); Tanner 15' (2:0); Demarmels (yellow card) 32'; Tanner 35' (3:0); Nielsen 68' (4:1); Marti 77' (5:1) von Wartburg 83' (6:1)	FCB summary	(yellow card) 32' Decastel; 39' (3:1) Decastel	Attendance: 4,500; Referee: (Switzerland) Ernest Guignet (Yverdon-les-Bains)

27 November 1977 Round 16	Zürich	1–1	Basel	Letzigrund, Zürich
14:30	Zwicker 15' (1:0); Lüdi (yellow card) 32'; Zappa (yellow card) 72'; Grob (yellow card) 78'	FCZ summary FCB summary	(yellow card) 42' Maradan; 78' (1:1) Schönenberger	Attendance: 11,500; Referee: (Switzerland) Rudolf Renggli (Luzern)
Note: Cold and snow flurries

3 December 1977 Round 17	Basel	2–1	Servette	St. Jakob Stadium, Basel
17:30	Tanner 38' (1:0); Schönenberger 89' (2:1)	FCB summary	55' (1:1) Chivers; (yellow card) Barberis	Attendance: 9,500; Referee: (Switzerland) Jean Dubach (Nidau)

11 December 1977 Round 18	Young Boys	4–5	Basel	Wankdorf Stadium, Bern
14:30	Zwygart 36' (1:1); Müller 38' (2:1); Müller 65' (3:5); Brechbühl 90' (4:5); Schmidlin (yellow card); Müller (yellow card)	Summary	20' (0:1) Maissen; 44' (2:2) Stohler; 48' (2:3) Tanner; 52' (2:4) Marti; 55' (2:5) Lauscher; (yellow card) Maradan	Attendance: 6,400; Referee: (Switzerland) Bruno Galler (Kirchdorf, Bern)

4 March 1978 Round 20	Basel	5–0	Sion	St. Jakob Stadium, Basel
15:30	Schär 10' (1:0); Schönenberger 25' (2:0); Ramseier 50' (3:0); Schönenberger 57' (4:0); Schönenberger 65' (5:0)	Summary	(yellow card) 75' Perrier	Attendance: 4,000; Referee: (Switzerland) Bruno Della Bruna (Lumino)

12 March 1978 Round 19	St. Gallen	1–2	Basel	Espenmoos, St. Gallen
15:00	Stöckl 84' (pen. 1:2)	Summary	32' (pen. 0:1) Stohler; 59' (0:2) Ramseier; (yellow card) Stohler	Attendance: 5,000; Referee: (Switzerland) Otto Isler (Zürich)

18 March 1978 Round 21	Lausanne-Sport	0–0	Basel	Olympique de la Pontaise, Lausanne
20:00	Sampedro (yellow card) 59'	Summary	(yellow card) 39' Maissen; (yellow card) 46' Schönenberger; (yellow card) 77' von Wartburg	Attendance: 4,200; Referee: (Switzerland) Bruno Galler (Kirchdorf, Bern)

22 March 1978 Round 22	Basel	2–5	Grasshopper Club	St. Jakob Stadium, Basel
20:00	Maissen 6' (1:0); Tanner 85' (2:4)	Summary	20' (1:1) Sulser; 20' (1:2) Sulser; 75' (1:3) Elsener; 81' (1:4) Sulser; 88' (2:5) Elsener; (yellow card) Becker	Attendance: 14,500; Referee: (Switzerland) André Daina (Éclépens)

==== Qualifying phase table ====
Pos	Team	Pld	W	D	L	GF	GA	GD	Pts	Qualification
1	Grasshopper Club	22	15	4	3	60	27	+33	34	To championship round
2	Servette	22	14	5	3	44	20	+24	33	To championship round
3	Lausanne-Sport	22	13	4	5	47	21	+26	30	To championship round
4	Basel	22	12	4	6	53	34	+19	28	To championship round
5	FC Zürich	22	11	6	5	38	27	+11	28	To championship round
6	Sion	22	6	9	7	29	33	−4	21	To championship round
7	Xamax	22	8	3	11	32	42	−10	19	To relegation play-out round
8	Young Boys	22	7	5	10	27	45	−18	19	To relegation play-out round
9	Chênois	22	8	2	12	27	35	−8	18	To relegation play-out round
10	St. Gallen	22	5	7	10	27	38	−11	17	To relegation play-out round
11	Étoile Carouge	22	5	3	14	22	40	−18	13	To relegation play-out round
12	Young Fellows Zürich	22	1	2	19	14	58	−44	4	To relegation play-out round

Source: rsssf.com
Rules for classification: 1) Points; 2) Goal difference; 3) Goals scored;

==== Championship group matches ====
1 April 1978 Round 1	Lausanne-Sport	1–1	Basel	Olympique de la Pontaise, Lausanne
20:30	Gross 71' (1:1)	Summary	(51 pen. 0:1) Stohler	Attendance: 3,000; Referee: (Switzerland) Jakob Baumann (Schaffhausen)
Note: Basel without Mundschin, Demarmels, Ramseier (injured), Schönenberger (suspended).

8 April 1978 Round 2	Basel	1–1	Zürich	St. Jakob Stadium, Basel
20:00	Lauscher 45' (1:0)	FCZ summary FCB summary	(yellow card) 24' Zappa; (yellow card) 64' Fischbach; (yellow card) 78' Chapuisat; 90' (1:1) Risi	Attendance: 12,000; Referee: (Switzerland) Bruno Galler (Kirchdorf, Bern)

15 April 1978 Round 3	Servette	0–2	Basel	Charmilles Stadium, Geneva
20:30	Chivers (yellow card) 41'; Trinchero (yellow card) 70'	Summary	13' (0:1) Maissen; (yellow card) 40' Fischli; 81' (0:2) Marti	Attendance: 7,500; Referee: (Switzerland) Jean Dubach (Nidau)

18 April 1978 Round 4	Sion	1–4	Basel	Stade Tourbillon, Sion
20;15	Vergères 82' (1:3); In-Albon (yellow card)	FCB Summary	45' (0:1) Schönenberger; 51' (0:2) Tanner; 80' (0:3) Maissen; 90' (1:4) Schönenberger	Attendance: 2,500; Referee: (Switzerland) Gottlieb Barmettler (Luzern)

22 April 1978 Round 5	Basel	2–0	Grasshopper Club	St. Jakob Stadium, Basel
20:00	Stohler 30' (pen. 1:0); Marti 57' (2:0)	Summary	(yellow card) Elsener	Attendance: 21,500; Referee: (Switzerland) Rudolf Renggli (Stans and Luzern)

29 April 1978 Round 6	Basel	3–1	Lausanne-Sport	St. Jakob Stadium, Basel
20:00	Maradan (penalty missed) 3′ Lauscher 26' (1:0); Schönenberger 59' (2:1); Schär 84' (3:1)	Summary	58' (1:1) Guillaume	Attendance: 18,000; Referee: (Switzerland) Jean Dubach (Nidau)

6 May 1978 Round 7	Zürich	4–2	Basel	Letzigrund, Zürich
20:00	Scheiwiler 22' (1:0); Risi 35' (2:0); Scheiwiler 61' (3:0); Botteron 88' (4:2)	FCZ summary FCB summary	64' (3:1) Demarmels; 74' (3:2) Marti	Attendance: 11,000; Referee: (Switzerland) Bruno Galler (Kirchdorf, Bern)

20 May 1978 Round 8	Basel	2–2	Servette	St. Jakob Stadium, Basel
20:00	Mundschin 3' (1:0); Maissen 49' (2:0)	Summary	71' (2:1) Chivers; 83' (2:2) Trinchero; (yellow card) Barberis	Attendance: 15,000; Referee: (Switzerland) Jean Dubach (Nidau)

24 May 1978 Round 9	Basel	2–0	Sion	St. Jakob Stadium, Basel
20:15	Schönenberger 33' (1:0); Lauscher 87' (2:0)	Summary		Attendance: 3,500; Referee: (Switzerland) Rudolf Affolter

27 May 1978 Round 10	Grasshopper Club	4–2	Basel	Hardturm, Zürich
20:15	Sulser 39' (1:0); Ponte 54' (2:2); Elsener 77' (3:2); Elsener 90' (4:2); T. Niggl (yellow card)	Summary	43' (1:1) Tanner; 50' (1:2) Tanner; (yellow card) Küng; (yellow card) Demarmels	Attendance: 25,000; Referee: (Switzerland) Walter Hungerbühler (St. Gallen)

==== League standings ====
Pos	Team	Pld	W	D	L	GF	GA	GD	BP	Pts	Qualification
1	Grasshopper Club	10	4	4	2	17	12	+5	17	29	Swiss Champions, qualified for 1978–79 European Cup and entered 1978 Intertoto Cup
2	Servette	10	3	5	2	10	10	0	17	28	Swiss Cup winners, qualified for 1978–79 Cup Winners' Cup
3	Basel	10	5	3	2	21	14	+7	14	27	qualified for 1978–79 UEFA Cup
4	Lausanne-Sport	10	4	3	3	21	14	+7	15	26	qualified for 1978–79 UEFA Cup
5	Zürich	10	5	2	3	15	15	0	14	26	entered 1978 Intertoto Cup
6	Sion	10	0	1	9	8	27	−19	11	12	entered 1978 Intertoto Cup

Source: rsssf.com

=== Swiss Cup ===
10 September 1977 Round of 32	FC Lerchenfeld	2–4	Basel	Sportanlagen Waldeck, Lerchenfeld (Thun)
14:30	Zahnd 23' (1:0); Walther 29' (2:0)	FCB summary	38' (2:1) Nielsen; 44' (2:2) Muhmenthaler; 60' (2:3) Muhmenthaler; 84' (2:4) Muhmenthaler	Attendance: 3,300; Referee: (Switzerland) Gottlieb Barmettler (Luzern)
Note: FC Lerchenfeld played the 1977-78 season in the 1. Liga (third-tier).

12 October 1977 Round of 16	Zürich	1–3	Basel	Letzigrund, Zürich
20:00	Cucinotta (yellow card) 45'; Baur 56' (1:2)	FCB summary FCZ summary	19' (0:1) Schönenberger; 49' (0:2) Schönenberger; 66' (1:3) Schönenberger; (yellow card) 72' Mundschin	Attendance: 14,000; Referee: (Switzerland) Peter Scherz (Aegerten)
Note: Following his very first hat-trick four days earlier in the league against St. Gallen, this was Roland Schönenberger's second hat-trick that he scored for his club.

9 November 1977 Quarter-final	Basel	4–1	St. Gallen	St. Jakob Stadium, Basel
19:30	Schönenberger 14' (1:0); Maissen 51' (2:1); Lauscher 54' (3:1); Lauscher 88' (4:1)	FCB summary	38' (1:1) Ries	Attendance: 5,500; Referee: (Switzerland) Otto Isler (Zürich)

2 May 1978 Semi-final	Grasshopper Club	5–1	Basel	Hardturm, Zürich
20:00	Bauer 12' (1:1); Sulser 49' (2:1); Hermann 53' (3:1); Elsener 62' (4:1); Ponte 88' (5:1); Niggl (yellow card)	FCB summary	4' (0:1) Lauscher; (yellow card) Lauscher	Attendance: 9,000; Referee: (Switzerland) Jakob Baumann (Schaffhausen)

=== Swiss League Cup ===
6 August 1977 Round of 32	Wettingen	0–3	Basel	Stadion Altenburg, Wettingen
		FCB summary	8' (0:1) Schönenberger; 38' (0:2) Fischli; 75' (0:3) Lauscher	Attendance: 3,500; Referee: (Switzerland) } Rudolf Renggli (Luzern)
Note: Very fair game, no yellow cards.

11 February 1978 Round of 16	Basel	2–1 (a.e.t.)	Chiasso	St. Jakob Stadium, Basel
15:00	Stohler (pen. 1:1); Tanner 111' (2:1); Lauscher (yellow card)	Summary	58' (0:1) Franz; (yellow card) Ostinelli	Attendance: 1,150; Referee: (Switzerland) Otto Isler (Zürich)

11 April 1978 Quarter-final	Basel	4–3 (a.e.t.)	BSC Young Boys	St. Jakob Stadium, Basel
20:00	Marti 68' (1:1); Schönenberger 72' (2:1); Schönenberger 74' (3:1); Rebmann 97' (o.g. 4:3)	Summary	17' (pen. 0:1) Zwygart; 88' (3:2) Schmid; 88' (3:3) Mast	Attendance: 2,600; Referee: (Switzerland) Otto Isler (Zürich)

9 May 1978 Semi-final	Basel	1–1 (a.e.t.) (4–5 p)	St. Gallen	St. Jakob Stadium, Basel
	Schönenberger 51' (1:1)	Summary	16' (0:1) Schlegel	Attendance: 1,700; Referee: (Switzerland) Jean-Marie Macheret, (Rueyres-St-Laurent)
	Penalties
	Schönenberger (penalty scored); Lauscher (penalty scored); Maradan (penalty scored); Tanner (penalty scored); Küng (penalty missed)		(penalty scored) Stöckl; (penalty scored) Brander; (penalty scored) Feuz; (penalty scored) Ries; (penalty scored) Schüepp

St. Gallen won 5–4 on penalties.

=== European Cup ===
First round

14 September 1977 First leg	Basel (Switzerland)	1–3	(Austria) Wacker	St. Jakob Stadium, Basel
20:00	von Wartburg 22' (1:0)	Report; FCB Summary	41' (1:1) Welzl; 45' (pen. 1:2) Welzl; 51' (1:3) Constantini	Attendance: 18,000; Referee: (Netherlands) Achille Verbecke

28 September 1977 Return leg	Wacker (Austria)	0–1 (3–2 agg.)	(Switzerland) Basel	Stadion Lehen, Salzburg
19:00		Report; FCB Summary	62' (0:1) Maissen	Attendance: 15,000; Referee: (East Germany) Adolf Prokop

Wacker won 3–2 on aggregate.

=== Coppa delle Alpi ===
==== Group B matches ====
16 July 1977 Round 1	Basel (Switzerland)	2–3	(France) Bastia	St. Jakob Stadium, Basel
	Demarmels 51' (1:1); Lauscher 79' (2:2); Demarmels (yellow card) 82'	Summary	36' (0:1) Larios; 72' (1:2) Vesir; (yellow card) 82' Larios; 87' (2:3) Larios	Attendance: 2,700; Referee: (France) Robert Wurtz

19 July 1977 Round 2	Basel (Switzerland)	3–2	(France) Olympique Lyonnais	St. Jakob Stadium, Basel
	Stohler 28' (1:0); Muhmenthaler 63' (2:0); Lauscher 74' (3:0)	Summary	75' (3:1) Martinez; 88' (pen. 3:2) Lacombe; (red card) 88' Martinez	Attendance: 1,700; Referee: (France) Achille Verbecke

23 July 1977 Round 3	Bastia (France)	3–0	(Switzerland) Basel	Stade Armand Cesari, Bastia
	Papi 43' (1:0); Mundschin 58' (o.g. 2:0); Orlanducci 67' (3:0)	Summary		Attendance: 2,022; Referee: (Switzerland) Ernest Guignet (Yverdon-les-Bains)

26 July 1977 Round 4	Olympique Lyonnais (France)	4–2	(Switzerland) Basel	Stade de Gerland, Lyon
	Geisser 39' (1:2); Gallice 45' (2:2); Chiesa 73' (3:2); Genet 88' (4:2)	Summary	3' (0:1) Marti; 35' (0:2) von Wartburg	Attendance: 2,300; Referee: (France) Jean-Marie Macheret

NB: teams did not play compatriots

==== Group standings ====
Pos	Team	Pld	W	D	L	GF	GA	GD	BP	Pts	
1	Bastia	4	3	1	0	8	3	+5	1	8 (Note: 1 bonus point awarded for victory by 3 or more goals)	Advanced to final
2	Lausanne-Sport	4	2	1	1	5	4	+1	0	5	
3	Olympique Lyonnais	4	1	0	3	8	9	−1	0	2	
4	Basel	4	1	0	3	7	12	−5	0	2	

Source: rsssf.com

== See also ==
- History of FC Basel
- List of FC Basel players
- List of FC Basel seasons

== Sources ==
- Rotblau: Jahrbuch Saison 2015/2016. Publisher: FC Basel Marketing AG. ISBN 978-3-7245-2050-4
- Die ersten 125 Jahre. Publisher: Josef Zindel im Friedrich Reinhardt Verlag, Basel. ISBN 978-3-7245-2305-5
- Switzerland 1977–78 at RSSSF
- Swiss League Cup at RSSSF
- Cup of the Alps 1977 at RSSSF
