= 1978–79 in Swiss football =

Football in Switzerland
- Season: 1978–79

Men's football
- Nationalliga A: Servette
- Nationalliga B: FC La Chaux-de-Fonds
- 1. Liga: 1. Liga champions: FC Raron; Group 1: FC Raron; Group 2: SR Delémont; Group 3: SV Muttenz; Group 4: FC Locarno
- Swiss Cup: Servette
- Swiss League Cup: Servette

Women's football
- Swiss Women's Super League: FFC Bern
- Swiss Cup: FC Spreitenbach

The following is a summary of the 1978–79 season of competitive football in Switzerland.

== Nationalliga A ==
=== Qualifying phase ===
Pos	Team	Pld	W	D	L	GF	GA	GD	Pts	Qualification
1	Zürich	22	13	6	3	51	19	+32	32	To championship round
2	Servette	22	12	6	4	56	23	+33	30	To championship round
3	Grasshopper Club	22	9	9	4	35	24	+11	27	To championship round
4	Basel	22	10	6	6	36	29	+7	26	To championship round
5	Young Boys	22	11	4	7	39	34	+5	26	To championship round
6	St. Gallen	22	11	4	7	34	34	0	26	To championship round
7	Xamax	22	8	8	6	42	33	+9	24	To relegation play-out round
8	Chênois	22	9	4	9	30	32	−2	22	To relegation play-out round
9	Lausanne-Sport	22	6	3	13	28	40	−12	15	To relegation play-out round
10	Chiasso	22	5	3	14	20	46	−26	13	To relegation play-out round
11	Nordstern Basel	22	2	8	12	19	44	−25	12	To relegation play-out round
12	Sion	22	3	5	14	20	52	−32	11	To relegation play-out round

Source: rsssf.com
Rules for classification: 1) Points; 2) Goal difference; 3) Goals scored;

=== Championship ===
Pos	Team	Pld	W	D	L	GF	GA	GD	BP	Pts	Qualification
1	Servette	10	10	0	0	23	5	+18	15	35	Champions qualified for 1979–80 European Cup and Swiss Cup winners
2	Zürich	10	6	1	3	19	14	+5	16	29	qualified for 1979–80 UEFA Cup and entered 1979 Intertoto Cup
3	Grasshopper Club	10	3	3	4	11	13	−2	14	23	qualified for 1979–80 UEFA Cup and entered 1979 Intertoto Cup
4	St. Gallen	10	2	3	5	8	11	−3	13	20	entered 1978 Intertoto Cup
5	Young Boys	10	1	4	5	5	17	−12	13	19	Swiss Cup finalist qualified for 1979–80 European Cup Winners' Cup
6	Basel	10	2	1	7	18	24	−6	13	18	

Source: rsssf.com
Rules for classification: 1) Points; 2) Goal difference; 3) Goals scored;

=== Relegation play-out ===
Pos	Team	Pld	W	D	L	GF	GA	GD	BP	Pts	Relegation
1	Chênois	10	3	7	0	21	14	+7	11	24	entered 1978 Intertoto Cup
2	Sion	10	5	4	1	15	8	+7	6	20	
3	Chiasso	10	5	3	2	16	10	+6	7	20	
4	Lausanne-Sport	10	5	2	3	20	16	+4	8	20	
5	Xamax	10	2	1	7	11	19	−8	12	17	
6	Nordstern Basel	10	1	1	8	8	24	−16	6	9	Relegated to 1979–80 Nationalliga B

Source: rsssf.com
Rules for classification: 1) Points; 2) Goal difference; 3) Goals scored;

== Nationalliga B ==
=== Final league table ===
Pos	Team	Pld	W	D	L	GF	GA	GD	Pts	Relegation
1	FC La Chaux-de-Fonds	30	18	7	5	71	31	+40	43	Champions promoted to 1979–80 Nationalliga A
2	Luzern	30	17	9	4	62	36	+26	43	Promoted to 1979–80 Nationalliga A
3	FC Winterthur	30	16	9	5	58	32	+26	41	To promotion play-off
4	Lugano	30	17	7	6	51	31	+20	41	To promotion play-off
5	FC Frauenfeld	30	10	12	8	46	39	+7	32	
6	FC Aarau	30	12	8	10	44	39	+5	32	
7	FC Bern	30	11	10	9	41	41	0	32	
8	Vevey-Sports	30	11	6	13	47	41	+6	28	
9	FC Fribourg	30	9	9	12	37	33	+4	27	
10	AC Bellinzona	30	10	7	13	47	49	−2	27	
11	FC Grenchen	30	9	9	12	27	32	−5	27	
12	SC Kriens	30	10	7	13	38	48	−10	27	
13	FC Biel-Bienne	30	9	8	13	35	55	−20	26	
14	FC Wettingen	30	8	9	13	40	48	−8	25	
15	Etoile Carouge FC	30	5	11	14	42	53	−11	21	Relegated to 1979–80 1. Liga
16	FC Young Fellows Zürich	30	3	2	25	21	99	−78	8	Relegated to 1979–80 1. Liga

Source: rsssf.com
Rules for classification: 1) Points; 2) Goal difference within the league, but decider play-off for qualifiers; 3) Goals scored;

=== Promotion play-off ===
The play-off match took place on 27 June 1979 at the Stadion Allmend in Luzern.

Team 1	Score	Team 2
Lugano	1–0 (a.e.t.)	FC Winterthur

Lugano win 1–0 and promoted to 1979–80 Nationalliga A. FC Winterthur remain in division

== 1. Liga ==
=== Group 1 ===
Pos	Team	Pld	W	D	L	GF	GA	GD	Pts	Qualification or relegation
1	FC Raron	26	16	8	2	58	21	+37	40	Play-off to Nationalliga B
2	FC Stade Lausanne	26	15	5	6	59	42	+17	35	Play-off to Nationalliga B
3	FC Renens	26	13	6	7	47	32	+15	32	
4	FC Martigny-Sports	26	12	6	8	44	36	+8	30	
5	ES FC Malley	26	10	6	10	51	46	+5	26	
6	FC Orbe	26	11	4	11	61	58	+3	26	
7	FC Stade Nyonnais	26	9	8	9	38	39	−1	26	
8	FC Boudry	26	10	6	10	38	43	−5	26	
9	FC Leytron	26	10	5	11	57	50	+7	25	
10	FC Meyrin	26	8	8	10	33	40	−7	24	
11	FC Monthey	26	8	7	11	28	40	−12	23	
12	FC Visp	26	9	4	13	31	41	−10	22	
13	Yverdon-Sport FC	26	9	3	14	31	48	−17	21	Relegation to 2. Liga Interregional
14	FC Le Locle	26	3	2	21	24	64	−40	8	Relegation to 2. Liga Interregional

Source: RSSSF
Rules for classification: 1) Points; 2) Goal difference within the league, but decider play-off for qualifiers.

=== Group 2 ===
Pos	Team	Pld	W	D	L	GF	GA	GD	Pts	Qualification or relegation
1	SR Delémont	26	18	7	1	60	24	+36	43	Play-off to Nationalliga B
2	FC Bulle	26	13	7	6	45	35	+10	33	Play-off to Nationalliga B
3	FC Lerchenfeld	26	11	8	7	45	31	+14	30	
4	FC Solothurn	26	11	7	8	41	30	+11	29	
5	US Boncourt	26	11	7	8	38	32	+6	29	
6	FC Aurore Bienne	26	10	8	8	30	30	0	28	
7	Central Fribourg	26	8	10	8	41	41	0	26	
8	FC Köniz	26	9	7	10	31	36	−5	25	
9	FC Laufen	26	6	10	10	26	34	−8	22	
10	FC Fétigny	26	6	10	10	41	53	−12	22	
11	FC Herzogenbuchsee	26	6	9	11	35	51	−16	21	
12	SC Derendingen	26	5	10	11	20	33	−13	20	
13	FC Dürrenast	26	6	6	14	36	47	−11	18	Relegation to 2. Liga Interregional
14	FC Rapid Ostermundigen	26	5	8	13	41	53	−12	18	Relegation to 2. Liga Interregional

Source: RSSSF
Rules for classification: 1) Points; 2) Goal difference within the league, but decider play-off for qualifiers.

=== Group 3 ===
Pos	Team	Pld	W	D	L	GF	GA	GD	Pts	Qualification or relegation
1	SV Muttenz	26	17	4	5	54	26	+28	38	Play-off to Nationalliga B
2	FC Baden	26	16	5	5	49	37	+12	37	Play-off to Nationalliga B
3	FC Schaffhausen	26	16	4	6	55	27	+28	36	
4	FC Turicum	26	11	9	6	46	38	+8	31	
5	FC Birsfelden	26	10	9	7	45	39	+6	29	
6	SC Brühl	26	13	2	11	50	46	+4	28	
7	FC Suhr	26	11	5	10	46	43	+3	27	
8	FC Blue Stars Zürich	26	10	7	9	48	46	+2	27	
9	FC Allschwil	26	8	6	12	31	43	−12	22	
10	FC Glattbrugg	26	7	5	14	37	47	−10	19	
11	FC Unterstrass	26	5	8	13	36	54	−18	18	
12	FC Gossau	26	4	10	12	30	50	−20	18	
13	FC Red Star Zürich	26	6	5	15	44	56	−12	17	Relegation to 2. Liga Interregional
14	FC Concordia Basel	26	5	7	14	34	53	−19	17	Relegation to 2. Liga Interregional

Source: RSSSF
Rules for classification: 1) Points; 2) Goal difference within the league, but decider play-off for qualifiers.

=== Group 4 ===
Pos	Team	Pld	W	D	L	GF	GA	GD	Pts	Qualification or relegation
1	FC Locarno	26	13	9	4	43	23	+20	35	Play-off to Nationalliga B
2	FC Ibach	26	16	3	7	46	30	+16	35	Play-off to Nationalliga B
3	Mendrisiostar	26	13	8	5	49	28	+21	34	
4	SC Zug	26	12	7	7	53	37	+16	31	
5	FC Balzers	26	13	4	9	58	44	+14	30	
6	FC Vaduz	26	10	8	8	50	43	+7	28	
7	FC Stäfa	26	11	6	9	32	28	+4	28	
8	FC Emmenbrücke	26	8	10	8	42	36	+6	26	
9	FC Morbio	26	9	6	11	36	44	−8	24	
10	FC Zug	26	9	4	13	37	47	−10	22	
11	FC Rüti	26	7	7	12	31	36	−5	21	
12	FC Emmen	26	6	8	12	29	62	−33	20	
13	FC Chur	26	5	7	14	31	48	−17	17	Relegation to 2. Liga Interregional
14	US Giubiasco	26	5	3	18	33	64	−31	13	Relegation to 2. Liga Interregional

Source: RSSSF
Rules for classification: 1) Points; 2) Goal difference within the league, but decider play-off for qualifiers.

=== Promotion play-off ===
==== Qualification round ====
Team 1	Score	Team 2
SV Muttenz	0–1	FC Ibach
FC Ibach	5–2	SV Muttenz

FC Ibach win 6–2 on aggregate and continue to the semi-finals.

Team 1	Score	Team 2
FC Baden	1–0	FC Locarno
FC Locarno	2–2	FC Baden

FC Baden win 3–2 on aggregate and continue to the semi-finals.

Team 1	Score	Team 2
FC Bulle	0–1	FC Raron
FC Raron	3–2	FC Bulle

FC Raron win 4–2 on aggregate and continue to the semi-finals.

Team 1	Score	Team 2
FC Stade Lausanne	2–3	SR Delémont
SR Delémont	1–0	FC Stade Lausanne

SR Delémont win 4–2 on aggregate and continue to the semi-finals.

==== Semi-final round ====
Team 1	Score	Team 2
FC Ibach	1–3	FC Raron
FC Raron	3–1	FC Ibach

FC Raron win 6–2 on aggregate and are promoted to 1979–80 Nationalliga B. FC Ibach remain in the division.

Team 1	Score	Team 2
FC Baden	1–0	SR Delémont
SR Delémont	1–1	FC Baden

FC Baden win 2–1 on aggregate and are promoted to 1979–80 Nationalliga B. SR Delémont remain in the division.

==== Final for 1. Liga championship ====
The final was played on 1 July in Baden.

Team 1	Score	Team 2
FC Baden	0–1	FC Raron

FC Raron win and became 1. Liga champions.

== Swiss Cup ==
The competition was played in a knockout system. In the case of a draw, extra time was played. If the teams were still level at the end of extra time, the match was replayed on the away team's pitch. The Cup-final was held in Bern.

=== Early rounds ===
The routes of the finalists to the final were:

- Third round: NLA teams with bye
- Fourth round: La Rondinella Neuveville-Servette 1:4 (a.e.t.). Vevey-Sports YB 1:2 (a.e.t.).
- Fifth round: Etoile Carouge Servette 0:3. YB Chiasso 3:2.
- Quarterfinals: Nordstern Basel Servette 0:2. YB St. Gallen 2:0.
- Semi-finals: Servette NE Xamax 3:2. YB Chênois 1:0 (a.e.t.).

=== Final ===
Whit Monday 4 June 1979
15:00
Final

Servette	1–1 (a.e.t.)	Young Boys
Pfister 52'	Report	78' Hussner

Wankdorf Stadium, Bern
Attendance: 31,765
Referee: (Switzerland)

20 June 1979
15:00
Replay

Servette	3–2	Young Boys
Weber 28'; Barberis 62'; Hamberg 73'	Report	10' Schmidlin; 32' Hussner

Wankdorf Stadium, Bern
Attendance: 30,000
Referee: (Switzerland)

== Swiss League Cup ==
=== Early rounds ===
The routes of the finalists to the final were:

- Round 1 (home 22 July and away 29 July): Servette 4:0 3:4 Etoile Carouge. Basel 2:0 2:3 Grenchen.
- Round 2: La Chaux-de-Fonds 0:1 Servette. Basel 1:0 Nordstern Basel.
- Quarter-finals: Chênois 2:4 Servette. Basel 3:1 Luzern.
- Semi-finals: Servette 3:1 Grasshopper Club. Xamax 0:2 Basel.

=== Final ===
1 May 1979
19:00
Final

Servette	2– 2 (a.e.t.)	Basel
Peterhans 5'; Barberis 37'	Summary	18', 87' Schönenberger
Penalties
Schnyder (penalty scored); Barberis (penalty scored); Guyot (penalty missed); Trinchero (penalty scored); Engel (penalty scored)	4–3	(penalty scored) Stohler; (penalty scored) Maradan; (penalty missed) Schönenberger; (penalty scored) von Wartburg; (penalty missed) Tanner

St. Jakob Stadium, Basel
Attendance: 8,500
Referee: (Switzerland) Jean-Marie Macheret

== Swiss Clubs in Europe ==
- Grasshopper Club as 1977–78 Nationalliga A champions: 1978–79 European Cup and entered 1978 Intertoto Cup
- Servette as Swiss Cup winners: 1978–79 European Cup Winners' Cup
- Basel as league third placed team: 1978–79 UEFA Cup
- Lausanne-Sport as league fourth placed team: 1978–79 UEFA Cup
- Zürich: entered 1978 Intertoto Cup
- Sion: entered 1978 Intertoto Cup
- Young Boys: entered 1978 Intertoto Cup

=== Grasshopper Club ===
==== European Cup ====
===== First round =====
13 September 1978 First leg	Grasshopper Club (Switzerland)	8–0	(Malta) Valletta	Hardturm, Zürich
	Sulser 31', 46', 58', 62', 64'; Ponte 32', 35'; Wehrli 67'	Report		Attendance: 3,500; Referee: Marcel Herrmann (Luxembourg)

27 September 1978 Second leg	Valletta (Malta)	3–5	(Switzerland) Grasshopper Club	Empire Stadium, Gżira
	Agius 56'; Seychell 83'; Farrugia 86'	Report	Sulser 13' (pen.); Ponte 61'; Traber 69', 78'; Her. Hermann 77'	Attendance: 2,500; Referee: Franz Latzin (Austria)

Grasshopper Club won 13–3 on aggregate.

===== Second round =====
18 October 1978 First leg	Real Madrid (Spain)	3–1	(Switzerland) Grasshopper Club	Santiago Bernabéu, Madrid
	Juanito 5'; García Hernández 65'; Santillana 77'	Report	Sulser 59'	Attendance: 35,000; Referee: Michel Vautrot (France)

1 November 1978 Second leg	Grasshopper Club (Switzerland)	2–0	(Spain) Real Madrid	Hardturm, Zürich
	Sulser 8', 86'	Report		Attendance: 28,000; Referee: Adolf Prokop (East Germany)

3–3 on aggregate; Grasshopper Club won on away goals.

===== Quarter-finals =====
7 March 1979 First leg	Nottingham Forest (England)	4–1	(Switzerland) Grasshopper Club	City Ground, Nottingham
	Birtles 31'; Robertson 47' (pen.); Gemmill 87'; Lloyd 89'	Report	Sulser 11'	Attendance: 31,949; Referee: Marjan Rauš (Yugoslavia)

21 March 1979 Second leg	Grasshopper Club (Switzerland)	1–1	(England) Nottingham Forest	Hardturm, Zürich
	Sulser 33' (pen.)	Report	O'Neill 38'	Attendance: 17,800; Referee: Gianfranco Menegali (Italy)

Nottingham Forest won 5–2 on aggregate.

==== Intertoto Cup ====
===== Group 4 =====
Pos	Team	Pld	W	D	L	GF	GA	GD	Pts	EIN	STA	GCZ	B03
1	(West Germany) Eintracht Braunschweig	6	4	1	1	10	3	+7	9	—	0–1	0–0	5–1
2	(Belgium) Standard Liège	6	2	3	1	6	3	+3	7	0–1	—	0–0	3–0
3	(Switzerland) Grasshopper Club	6	1	3	2	4	5	−1	5	0–2	0–0	—	1–2
4	(Denmark) Boldklubben 1903	6	1	1	4	7	16	−9	3	1–2	2–2	1–3	—

Source: mogiel.net
Rules for classification: 1) Points; 2) Goal difference; 3) Goals scored; 4) Head-to-head points; 5) Away goals scored; 6) Draw.

=== Servette ===
==== Cup Winners' Cup ====
===== First round =====
13 September 1978 First leg	PAOK FC (Greece)	2–0	(Switzerland) Servette	Toumba Stadium, Thessaloniki
	Kermanidis 77'; Sarafis 87'	Report		Attendance: 10,624; Referee: Constantin Bărbulescu (Romania)

27 September 1978 Second leg	Servette (Switzerland)	4–0	(Greece) PAOK FC	Charmilles Stadium, Geneva
	15' Pfister; 76' Hamberg; 86', 89' Elia	Report		Attendance: 12,000; Referee: László Pádár (Hungary)

Servette FC won 4–2 on aggregate.

===== Second round =====
18 October 1978 First leg	Servette (Switzerland)	2–1	(France) AS Nancy	Charmilles Stadium, Geneva
	Hamberg 28'; Barberis 58'	Report	35' Rubio	Attendance: 23,000; Referee: Vojtěch Christov (Czechoslovakia)

1 November 1978 Second leg	AS Nancy (France)	2–2	(Switzerland) Servette	Stade Marcel Picot, Tomblaine
	Zénier 70' (pen.); Umpiérrez 89'	Report	68' Elia; 76' Schnyder	Attendance: 18,483; Referee: Tome Manojlovski (Yugoslavia)

Servette FC won 4–3 on aggregate.

===== Quarter-finals =====
7 March 1979 First leg	Fortuna Düsseldorf (West Germany)	0–0	(Switzerland) Servette	Düsseldorf
				Stadium: Rheinstadion

21 March 1979 Second leg	Servette (Switzerland)	1–1	(West Germany) Fortuna Düsseldorf	Charmilles Stadium, Geneva
	Andrey 80'		34' Bommer

Aggregate score 1–1. Fortuna Düsseldorf won on away goals

=== Basel ===
==== UEFA Cup ====
===== First round =====
13 September 1978 First leg	Basel (Switzerland)	2 – 3	(Germany) VfB Stuttgart	Basel
20:00	Stohler 30' von Wartburg (yellow card) 30' (red card) 40'; Tanner 78'	UEFA report FCB report	44' D. Hoeneß; 54', 70' Ohlicher; (yellow card) 85' Förster	Stadium: St. Jakob Stadium; Attendance: 25,100; Referee: (Scotland) Brian McGinlay

27 September 1978 Second leg	VfB Stuttgart (Germany)	4 – 1	(Switzerland) Basel	Stuttgart
20:00	Kelsch 24', 48', 68'; Müller 64'	UEFA report FCB report	35' Schönenberger	Stadium: Neckarstadion; Attendance: 23,000; Referee: (Ukraine) Miroslav Stupar

VfB Stuttgart won 7–3 on aggregate.

=== Lausanne-Sport ===
==== UEFA Cup ====
===== First round =====
13 September 1978 First leg	Jeunesse Esch (Luxembourg)	0–0	(Switzerland) Lausanne-Sport	Stade de la Frontière, Esch-sur-Alzette
		Report		Attendance: 2,200; Referee: Michel Vautrot (France)

26 September 1978 Second leg	Lausanne-Sport (Switzerland)	2–0	(Luxembourg) Jeunesse Esch	Stade Olympique de la Pontaise, Lausanne
	Diserens 39'; Sampedro 76'	Report		Attendance: 4,000; Referee: Jean-Claude Jourquin (Belgium)

Lausanne-Sport won 2–0 on aggregate.

===== Second round =====
18 October 1978 First leg	Ajax (Netherlands)	1–0	(Switzerland) Lausanne-Sport	Olympic Stadium, Amsterdam
	Lerby 23'	Report		Attendance: 22,500; Referee: Valentin Lipatov (Soviet Union)

1 November 1978 Second leg	Lausanne-Sport (Switzerland)	0–4	(Netherlands) Ajax	Stade Olympique de la Pontaise, Lausanne
		Report	10' Erkens; 13', 83' Clarke; 37' Arnesen	Attendance: 16,000; Referee: Nikola Dudin (Bulgaria)

Ajax won 5–0 on aggregate.

=== Zürich ===
==== Intertoto Cup ====
===== Group 5 =====
Matches

24 June 1978 Round 1	Maccabi Tel Aviv (Israel)	0–2	(Switzerland) Zürich	Tel Aviv
		FCZ summary	52' (0:1) Risi; 80' (0:2) Risi	Attendance: 2,500

1 July 1978 Round 2	Zürich (Switzerland)	0–2	(Sweden) Malmö FF	Linthstrasse, Tuggen
		FCZ summary	22' (0:1) Sjöberg; 82' (0:2) Sjöberg	Attendance: 2,000; Referee: (Switzerland) Rudolf Renggli (Luzern/Stans)

8 July 1978 Round 3	Zürich (Switzerland)	2–0	(Austria) First Vienna	Stadion Kleinfeld, Kriens
	Risi 58' (1:0); Scheiwiler 61' (2:0)	FCZ summary	(yellow card) Kuhnert	Attendance: 1,200; Referee: (Switzerland) Jakob Baumann (Schaffhausen)

02 July 1978 Round 4	Malmö FF (Sweden)	2–0	(Switzerland) Zürich	Malmö Stadion, Malmö
	Ljungberg 37' (1:0); Sjöberg 41' (2:0); Kristensson (red card)	FCZ summary		Attendance: 2,150; Referee: (Sweden) Erik Fredriksson

22 July 1978 Round 5	First Vienna (Austria)	0–2	(Switzerland) Zürich	Stadion Wiener Neustadt, Vienna
		FCZ summary	35' (0:1) Risi; 89' (0:2) Botteron	Attendance: 2,500; Referee: (Austria) Adolf Mathias

29 July 1978 Round 6	Zürich (Switzerland)	0–3	(Israel) Maccabi Tel Aviv	Letzigrund, Zürich
		FCZ summary	3' (0:1) Peretz; 25' (0:2) Tabak; 78' (0:3) Tabak	Attendance: 2,500; Referee: (Switzerland) Bruno Galler (Kirchdorf, Bern)

Table

Pos	Team	Pld	W	D	L	GF	GA	GD	Pts	MAL	ZÜR	MTA	FVI
1	(Sweden) Malmö FF	6	5	1	0	11	3	+8	11	—	2–0	3–1	2–1
2	(Switzerland) Zürich	6	3	0	3	6	7	−1	6	0–2	—	0–3	2–0
3	(Israel) Maccabi Tel Aviv	6	2	0	4	10	10	0	4	0–1	0–2	—	5–1
4	(Austria) First Vienna	6	1	1	4	6	13	−7	3	1–1	0–2	3–1	—

Source: mogiel.net
Rules for classification: 1) Points; 2) Goal difference; 3) Goals scored; 4) Head-to-head points; 5) Away goals scored; 6) Draw.

=== Sion ===
==== Intertoto Cup ====
===== Group 6 =====
Pos	Team	Pld	W	D	L	GF	GA	GD	Pts	LKE	BRY	STU	SIO
1	(Czechoslovakia) Lokomotíva Košice	6	4	2	0	17	4	+13	10	—	2–1	4–0	5–0
2	(Norway) Bryne FK	6	3	2	1	10	5	+5	8	1–1	—	2–0	2–2
3	(Austria) Sturm Graz	6	2	0	4	4	11	−7	4	0–3	0–2	—	3–0
4	(Switzerland) Sion	6	0	2	4	4	15	−11	2	2–2	0–2	0–1	—

Source: mogiel.net
Rules for classification: 1) Points; 2) Goal difference; 3) Goals scored; 4) Head-to-head points; 5) Away goals scored; 6) Draw.

=== YB ===
==== Intertoto Cup ====
===== Group 7 =====
Pos	Team	Pld	W	D	L	GF	GA	GD	Pts	TAT	ESB	WSC	YB
1	(Czechoslovakia) Tatran Prešov	6	6	0	0	18	2	+16	12	—	4–2	6–0	1–0
2	(Denmark) Esbjerg	6	3	1	2	10	8	+2	7	0–2	—	3–1	3–0
3	(Austria) Wiener Sport-Club	6	1	1	4	3	15	−12	3	0–4	0–1	—	2–1
4	(Switzerland) Young Boys	6	0	2	4	2	8	−6	2	0–1	1–1	0–0	—

Source: mogiel.net
Rules for classification: 1) Points; 2) Goal difference; 3) Goals scored; 4) Head-to-head points; 5) Away goals scored; 6) Draw.

== Sources ==
- Switzerland 1978–79 at RSSSF
- Swiss League Cup finals at RSSSF
- European Competitions 1978–79 at RSSSF.com
- Cup finals at Fussball-Schweiz
- Intertoto history at Pawel Mogielnicki's Page
- Josef Zindel (2018). FC Basel 1893. Die ersten 125 Jahre (in German). Basel: Friedrich Reinhardt Verlag. ISBN 978-3-7245-2305-5.

Preceded by 1977–78	Seasons in Swiss football	Succeeded by 1979–80
