= 1977–78 Swiss League Cup =

Tournament details
- Country: Switzerland
- Teams: 32

Final positions
- Champions: St. Gallen
- Runners-up: Grasshopper Club

Tournament statistics
- Matches played: 31

The 1977–78 Swiss League Cup was the sixth edidition of the Swiss League Cup competition since its introduction in 1972. The first round was played in summer 1977 as a pre-season warm-up to the 1977–78 Swiss football season, the later rounds were played after the winter-break.

== Overview ==
The League Cup had been created five seasons earlier to allow clubs from the top two tiers to compete in a tournament in advance of the league season, with the semi-finals and final played in the Autumn. But, in the passed few season, only the first round was played in advance of the season, the later rounds were played in the second half of the league season.

The matches were played in a single knockout format. In the event of a draw after 90 minutes, the match went into extra time. In the event of a draw at the end of extra time, a penalty shoot-out was to decide which team qualified for the next round. No replays were foreseen.

== First round ==
=== Summary ===
Team 1	Score	Team 2
6 August 1977
Aarau	0–1	La Chaux-de-Fonds
Kriens	0–2	Young Fellows Zürich
Zürich	9–0	Bellinzona
Xamax	5–0	Grenchen
Fribourg	1–4	Bulle
Nordstern Basel	2–1	Luzern
Wettingen	0–3	Basel
Stade Nyonnais	0–9	Sion
Vevey-Sports	1–1 (a.e.t.) (5–6 p)	Étoile Carouge
Young Boys	1–0	Servette
Chur	1–3	Winterthur
Gossau	1–4	Chiasso
Frauenfeld	0–7	Grasshopper Club
Lugano	0–2	St. Gallen
Lausanne-Sport	3–1	Chênois
17 August 1977
Biel-Bienne	6–1	FC Aurore Bienne

=== Matches ===
6 August 1977

Aarau	0–1	La Chaux-de-Fonds
	FCA summary	35' (0:1) Hochuli

Stadion Brügglifeld, Aarau
Attendance: 850
Referee: (Switzerland) Otto Wyniger

6 August 1977

Zürich	9–0	Bellinzona
Cucinotta 20' (1:0); Cucinotta 28' (2:0); Risi 41' (pen. 3:0); Fischbach 42' (4:0); Torstensson 46' (5:0); Risi 48' (6:0); Cucinotta 65' (7:0); Cucinotta 77' (8:0); Scheiwiler (9:0)	FCZ summary

Letzigrund, Zürich
Attendance: 1,588
Referee: (Switzerland) Jaberg (Thun)

6 August 1977

Wettingen	0–3	Basel
	Summary	8' (0:1) Schönenberger; 38' (0:2) Fischli; 75' (0:3) Lauscher

Stadion Altenburg, Wettingen
Attendance: 3,500
Referee: (Switzerland) Rudolf Renggli (Luzern)

6 August 1977

Young Boys	1–0	Servette
Schmid 73' (1:0)	YB summary Servette summary	(yellow card) 83' Thouvenel

Wankdorf Stadium, Bern
Attendance: 4,200
Referee: (Switzerland) André Daina (Éclépens)

== Second round ==
=== Summary ===
Team 1	Score	Team 2
11 February 1978
Winterthur	1–1 (a.e.t.) (8–6 p)	St. Gallen
Xamax	1–2	La Chaux-de-Fonds
Biel-Bienne	0–6	Lausanne-Sport
Basel	2–1 (a.e.t.)	Chiasso
12 February 1978
Étoile Carouge	0–1	Sion
Nordstern Basel	0–2	Grasshopper Club
Zürich	3–0	Young Fellows Zürich
Young Boys	3–0	Bulle

=== Matches ===
11 February 1978
15:00

Basel	2–1 (a.e.t.)	Chiasso
Stohler 76' (pen. 1:1); Tanner 111' (2:1); Lauscher (yellow card)	FCB summary	58' (0:1) Franz; (yellow card) Ostinelli

St. Jakob Stadium, Basel
Attendance: 1,150
Referee: (Switzerland) Otto Isler (Zürich)

12 February 1978

Étoile Carouge	0–1	Sion
	RSSSF summary	Goal

Stade de la Fontenette, Carouge

12 February 1978

Zürich	3–0	Young Fellows Zürich
Cucinotta 38' (1:0); Zwicker 55' (2:0); Cucinotta 90' (3:0)	FCZ summary

Letzigrund, Zürich
Attendance: 1,200
Referee: (Switzerland) Wolfer (Volketswil)

12 February 1978

Young Boys	3–0	Bulle
Schmid 31' (1:0); Brechbühl 66' (2:0); Burkhardt 79' (3:0)	YB summary

Wankdorf Stadium, Bern
Attendance: 628
Referee: (Switzerland) Franz Gächter (Suhr, Aargau)

== Quarter-finals ==
=== Summary ===
Team 1	Score	Team 2
12 March 1978
Lausanne-Sport	0–1	Zürich
27 March 1978
Sion	1–2 (a.e.t.)	St. Gallen
11 April 1978
Basel	4–3 (a.e.t.)	Young Boys
25 April 1978
Grasshopper Club	8–0	La Chaux-de-Fonds

=== Matches ===
12 March 1978

Lausanne-Sport	0–1	Zürich
	FCZ summary	9' (0:1) Scheiwiler

Olympique de la Pontaise, Lausanne
Attendance: 2,800
Referee: (Switzerland) Gottlieb Barmettler (Luzern)

27 March 1978

Sion	1–2 (a.e.t.)	St. Gallen
Pillet 75' (1:1)	RSSSF summary	20' (0:1) Ries; 115' (1:2) Ries

Stade Tourbillon, Sion

11 April 1978
20:00

Basel	4 – 3 (a.e.t.)	BSC Young Boys
Marti 68' (1:1); Schönenberger 72' (2:1); Schönenberger 74' (3:1) (Rebmann) 97' (o.g. 4:3)	Summary	17' (pen. 0:1) Zwygart; 88' (3:2) Schmid; 88' (3:3) Mast

St. Jakob Stadium, Basel
Attendance: 2,600
Referee: (Switzerland) Otto Isler (Zürich)

25 April 1978

Grasshopper Club	8–0	La Chaux-de-Fonds
Bouli 9' (1:0); Bouli 13' (2:0); Wehrli 33' (3:0); Hey 70' (4:0); Ponte 77' (5:0); Elsener 81' (6:0); Ponte 87' (7:0); Ponte 89' (8:0)	RSSSF summary

Hardturm, Zürich

== Semi-finals ==
=== Summary ===
Team 1	Score	Team 2
9 May 1978
Grasshopper Club	5–1	Zürich
Basel	1–1 (a.e.t.) (4–5 p)	St. Gallen

=== Matches ===
9 May 1978

Grasshopper Club	5–1	Zürich
Ponte 13' (1:0); Ponte 43' (2:0); Bosco 68' (3:0); Ponte 70' (4:0); Hey 75' (5:0)	summary	88' (5:1) Zwicker

Hardturm, Zürich
Attendance: 3,700
Referee: (Switzerland) Jean Dubach (Nidau)

9 May 1978

Basel	1–1 (a.e.t.)	St. Gallen
Schönenberger 51' (1:1)	Summary	16' (0:1) Schlegel
Penalties
Schönenberger (penalty scored); Lauscher (penalty scored); Maradan (penalty scored); Tanner (penalty scored); Küng (penalty missed)	4–5	(penalty scored) Stöckli; (penalty scored) Brander; (penalty scored) Feuz; (penalty scored) Ries; (penalty scored) Schüepp

St. Jakob Stadium, Basel
Attendance: 1,700
Referee: (Switzerland) Jean-Marie Macheret

== Final ==
The final was held at the Schützenwiese in Winterthur on 15 August 1978.

=== Summary ===
Team 1	Score	Team 2
15 August 1978
St. Gallen	3–2	Grasshopper Club

=== Telegram ===
15 August 1978

St. Gallen	3–2	Grasshopper Club
Labhart 6' (1:0); Labhart 60' (2:1); R. Müller 80' (3:2)	RSSSF summary	19' (1:1) Nafzger; 61' (2:2) Wehrli

Schützenwiese, Winterthur
Attendance: 3,500
Referee: (Switzerland) Bruno Della Bruna (Lumino)

St. Gallen won the cup and this was the club's first League Cup title to this date.

== Further in Swiss football ==
- 1977–78 Nationalliga A
- 1977–78 Swiss 1. Liga
- 1977–78 Swiss Cup
