= 1978–79 Servette FC season =

Servette FC
1978-79 season
- Manager: Péter Pázmándy
- Stadium: Stade des Charmilles
- Nationalliga A: 1st
- Swiss Cup: Winners
- Swiss League Cup: Winners
- Cup of the Alps: Winners
- Cup Winners' Cup: Quarter-finals
- Top goalscorer: League: Piet Hamberg (15 goals); All: Piet Hamberg (22 goals)

The 1978–79 Servette season was probably the greatest season in the history of Servette FC, with the club winning the Nationalliga A, the Swiss Cup, the Swiss League Cup and the Cup of the Alps. The Geneva club ended its league campaign with 35 points, with six more points than runners-up FC Zürich.

Servette started the season by defeating Lausanne-Sport in the Cup of the Alps by 1978. They defeated Young Boys and Basel in the finals of the Swiss Cup and Swiss League Cup, respectively.

In the UEFA Cup Winners' Cup, Servette beat PAOK and Nancy in the first two rounds, but eventually missed out on the semi-finals due to losing to Fortuna Düsseldorf in the quarter-finals because of the away goal rule.

Due to his performances throughout the season, star playmaker Umberto Barberis won the Swiss Footballer of the Year award.

== Squad ==
Note: Flags indicate national team as defined under FIFA eligibility rules; some limited exceptions apply. Players may hold more than one non-FIFA nationality.

No.	Pos.	Nation	Player
—	GK	SUI	Karl Engel
—	GK	SUI	Jean-Claude Milani
—	DF	SUI	Lucio Bizzini
—	DF	SUI	Gérald Coutaz
—	DF	SUI	Guy Dutoit
—	DF	SUI	Gilbert Guyot
—	DF	SUI	Jean-Luc Martin
—	DF	ITA	Gianfranco Seramondi
—	DF	SUI	Jean-Yves Valentini
—	MF	SUI	Umberto Barberis
—	MF	SUI	Marc Schnyder
—	MF	SUI	Serge Trinchero

No.	Pos.	Nation	Player
—	FW	SUI	Claude Andrey
—	FW	SUI	Angelo Elia
—	FW	NED	Piet Hamberg
—	FW	SUI	Yves Mauron
—	FW	SUI	Joko Pfister
—	FW	SUI	Franz Peterhans
—	FW	SUI	Hans-Peter Weber

== Competitions ==
=== Cup of the Alps ===
15 August 1978 Final	Servette (Switzerland)	4–0	(Switzerland) Lausanne-Sport	Stade des Charmilles, Geneva
	Elia 12', 23'; Weber 85'; Barberis 88'	Report
