= 1979–80 in Swiss football =

Football in Switzerland
- Season: 1979–80

Men's football
- Nationalliga A: Basel
- Nationalliga B: AC Bellinzona
- 1. Liga: 1. Liga champions Mendrisiostar; Group 1: FC Bulle; Group 2: FC Laufen; Group 3: FC Emmen; Group 4: Mendrisiostar
- Swiss Cup: Sion
- Swiss League Cup: Servette

Women's football
- Swiss Women's Super League: SV Seebach Zürich
- Swiss Cup: FFC Bern

The following is a summary of the 1979–80 season of competitive football in Switzerland.

== Nationalliga A ==
=== League table ===
==== Qualifying phase table ====
Pos	Team	Pld	W	D	L	GF	GA	GD	Pts	Qualification
1	Servette	26	16	7	3	61	25	+36	39	Advance to championship round halved points (rounded up) as bonus
2	Basel	26	15	7	4	67	27	+40	37	Advance to championship round halved points (rounded up) as bonus
3	Grasshopper Club	26	14	8	4	61	21	+40	36	Advance to championship round halved points (rounded up) as bonus
4	Luzern	26	14	4	8	44	44	0	32	Advance to championship round halved points (rounded up) as bonus
5	Zürich	26	13	5	8	56	42	+14	31	Advance to championship round halved points (rounded up) as bonus
6	Sion	26	11	9	6	47	37	+10	31	Advance to championship round halved points (rounded up) as bonus
7	St. Gallen	26	11	6	9	48	37	+11	28	entered 1980 Intertoto Cup
8	Chiasso	26	6	11	9	27	43	−16	23	
9	Lausanne-Sport	26	8	6	12	35	38	−3	22	
10	Young Boys	26	8	5	13	34	49	−15	21	entered 1980 Intertoto Cup
11	Chênois	26	4	12	10	32	45	−13	20	
12	Xamax	26	8	4	14	33	48	−15	20	entered 1980 Intertoto Cup
13	La Chaux-de-Fonds	26	5	7	14	24	57	−33	17	Relegated to 1980–81 Nationalliga B
14	Lugano	26	1	5	20	18	74	−56	7	Relegated to 1980–81 Nationalliga B

Source: rsssf.com
Rules for classification: 1) Points; 2) Goal difference; 3) Goals scored;

==== Championship table ====
Pos	Team	Pld	W	D	L	GF	GA	GD	BP	Pts	Qualification
1	Basel	10	6	2	2	24	11	+13	19	33	Champions, qualified for 1980–81 European Cup
2	Grasshopper Club	10	5	3	2	21	11	+10	18	31	qualified for 1980–81 UEFA Cup
3	Servette	10	5	1	4	18	11	+7	20	31	qualified for 1980–81 UEFA Cup
4	Zürich	10	5	1	4	17	15	+2	16	27	
5	Sion	10	4	2	4	22	20	+2	16	26	Swiss Cup winners, qualified for 1980–81 Cup Winners' Cup and entered 1980 Intertoto Cup
6	Luzern	10	0	1	9	4	38	−34	16	17	

Source: rsssf.com
Rules for classification: 1) Points; 2) Goal difference; 3) Goals scored;

== Nationalliga B ==
=== League table ===
Pos	Team	Pld	W	D	L	GF	GA	GD	Pts	Qualification
1	AC Bellinzona	26	12	14	0	37	14	+23	38	NLB Champions promoted to 1980–81 Nationalliga A
2	FC Nordstern Basel	26	15	7	4	63	32	+31	37	Promoted to 1980–81 Nationalliga A
3	FC Winterthur	26	13	7	6	46	32	+14	33	
4	Vevey Sports	26	12	7	7	46	27	+19	31	
5	FC Fribourg	26	11	7	8	30	24	+6	29	
6	FC Bern	26	11	7	8	44	41	+3	29	
7	FC Frauenfeld	26	9	10	7	30	26	+4	28	
8	FC Grenchen	26	9	8	9	38	40	−2	26	
9	FC Aarau	26	8	8	10	43	52	−9	24	
10	FC Biel-Bienne	26	6	11	9	24	29	−5	23	
11	FC Wettingen	26	6	8	12	47	46	+1	20	
12	SC Kriens	26	6	6	14	29	51	−22	18	
13	FC Raron	26	5	5	16	21	47	−26	15	Relegated to 1980–81 1. Liga
14	FC Baden	26	5	3	18	29	66	−37	13	Relegated to 1980–81 1. Liga

Source: rsssf.com
Rules for classification: 1) Points; 2) Goal difference; 3) Goals scored;

== 1. Liga ==
=== Group 1 ===
Pos	Team	Pld	W	D	L	GF	GA	GD	Pts	Qualification or relegation
1	FC Bulle	26	20	3	3	68	37	+31	43	Play-off to Nationalliga B
2	Etoile Carouge FC	26	17	2	7	64	29	+35	36	Play-off to Nationalliga B
3	FC Montreux-Sports	26	13	6	7	43	30	+13	32	
4	FC Martigny-Sports	26	12	6	8	49	31	+18	30	
5	FC Monthey	26	12	5	9	43	34	+9	29	
6	ES FC Malley	26	11	6	9	54	43	+11	28	
7	FC Renens	26	9	8	9	39	32	+7	26	
8	FC Stade Lausanne	26	9	8	9	48	51	−3	26	
9	FC Leytron	26	9	4	13	51	53	−2	22	
10	FC Stade Nyonnais	26	9	4	13	45	65	−20	22	
11	FC Orbe	26	6	9	11	47	56	−9	21	
12	FC Fétigny	26	8	5	13	29	45	−16	21	
13	FC Meyrin	26	6	7	13	30	55	−25	19	Relegation to 2. Liga Interregional
14	FC Visp	26	2	5	19	32	81	−49	9	Relegation to 2. Liga Interregional

Source: RSSSF
Rules for classification: 1) Points; 2) Goal difference within the league, but decider play-off for qualifiers.

=== Group 2 ===
Pos	Team	Pld	W	D	L	GF	GA	GD	Pts	Qualification or relegation
1	FC Laufen	26	15	7	4	56	18	+38	37	Play-off to Nationalliga B
2	SV Muttenz	26	18	1	7	60	31	+29	37	To decider for second place
3	FC Aurore Bienne	26	15	7	4	42	22	+20	37	To decider for second place
4	FC Köniz	26	11	7	8	54	42	+12	29	
5	SR Delémont	26	11	7	8	39	31	+8	29	
6	FC Allschwil	26	10	8	8	31	28	+3	28	
7	Central Fribourg	26	10	6	10	35	40	−5	26	
8	US Boncourt	26	9	5	12	31	36	−5	23	
9	FC Lerchenfeld	26	9	5	12	44	59	−15	23	
10	FC Boudry	26	8	6	12	35	38	−3	22	
11	SC Binningen	26	9	2	15	34	60	−26	20	
12	FC Birsfelden	26	6	7	13	25	35	−10	19	
13	SC Düdingen	26	7	4	15	33	60	−27	18	Relegation to 2. Liga Interregional
14	FC Lengnau	26	7	2	17	36	55	−19	16	Relegation to 2. Liga Interregional

Source: RSSSF
Rules for classification: 1) Points; 2) Goal difference within the league, but decider play-off for qualifiers.

==== Decider for second place ====
The decider match for second place was played on 28 May in La Blancherie in Delémont

Team 1	Score	Team 2
SV Muttenz	0–0 a.e.t. 4–2 pen.	FC Aurore Bienne

SV Muttenz win after the penalty shoot-out and advance to play-offs. FC Aurore Bienne remain in the division.

=== Group 3 ===
Pos	Team	Pld	W	D	L	GF	GA	GD	Pts	Qualification or relegation
1	FC Emmen	26	17	5	4	74	35	+39	39	Play-off to Nationalliga B
2	FC Emmenbrücke	26	17	3	6	65	38	+27	37	Play-off to Nationalliga B
3	FC Sursee	26	10	13	3	57	37	+20	33	
4	SC Derendingen	26	12	8	6	45	37	+8	32	
5	FC Suhr	26	13	4	9	50	39	+11	30	
6	FC Blue Stars Zürich	26	12	4	10	45	41	+4	28	
7	FC Solothurn	26	9	6	11	34	33	+1	24	
8	SC Young Fellows	26	8	8	10	39	41	−2	24	
9	FC Turicum	26	7	10	9	39	49	−10	24	
10	FC Schaffhausen	26	9	5	12	39	48	−9	23	
11	FC Oberentfelden	26	8	6	12	42	58	−16	22	
12	FC Glattbrugg	26	6	6	14	38	56	−18	18	Decider for twelfth place
13	FC Herzogenbuchsee	26	6	6	14	30	54	−24	18	Decider for twelfth place
14	FC Unterstrass	26	4	4	18	25	56	−31	12	Relegation to 2. Liga Interregional

Source: RSSSF
Rules for classification: 1) Points; 2) Goal difference within the league, but decider play-off for qualifiers.

==== Decider for twelfth place ====
The decider was played on 1 June in Baden.

Team 1	Score	Team 2
FC Herzogenbuchsee	5–1	FC Glattbrugg

FC Herzogenbuchsee win and remain in the division. FC Glattbrugg are relegated to 2. Liga Interregional.

=== Group 4 ===
Pos	Team	Pld	W	D	L	GF	GA	GD	Pts	Qualification or relegation
1	Mendrisiostar	26	17	6	3	47	17	+30	40	Play-off to Nationalliga B
2	FC Altstätten (St. Gallen)	26	13	11	2	58	34	+24	37	Play-off to Nationalliga B
3	FC Ibach	26	13	8	5	58	31	+27	34	
4	FC Locarno	26	11	8	7	37	29	+8	30	
5	FC Vaduz	26	10	9	7	55	38	+17	29	
6	FC Rüti	26	11	6	9	36	35	+1	28	
7	FC Stäfa	26	11	4	11	35	39	−4	26	
8	FC Balzers	26	9	5	12	49	55	−6	23	
9	FC Uzwil	26	7	9	10	44	57	−13	23	
10	FC Morbio	26	7	7	12	37	48	−11	21	
11	FC Gossau	26	6	8	12	35	50	−15	20	
12	SC Brühl	26	4	11	11	26	43	−17	19	Decider for twelfth place
13	SC Zug	26	6	7	13	31	49	−18	19	Decider for twelfth place
14	FC Zug	26	2	11	13	17	40	−23	15	Relegation to 2. Liga Interregional

Source: RSSSF
Rules for classification: 1) Points; 2) Goal difference within the league, but decider play-off for qualifiers.

==== Decider for twelfth place ====
The decider was played on 1 June in Zürich.

Team 1	Score	Team 2
SC Zug	4–3 a.e.t.	SC Brühl

SC Zug win and remain in division. SC Brühl are relegated to 2. Liga Interregional.

=== Promotion play-off ===
==== Qualification round ====
Team 1	Score	Team 2
FC Bulle	2–2	FC Altstätten (SG)
FC Altstätten (SG)	1–3	FC Bulle

FC Bulle win 5–3 on aggregate and continue to the finals.

Team 1	Score	Team 2
Etoile Carouge FC	0–4	Mendrisiostar
Mendrisiostar	1–0	Etoile Carouge FC

Mendrisiostar win 5–0 on aggregate and continue to the finals.

Team 1	Score	Team 2
SV Muttenz	0–0	FC Emmen
FC Emmen	3–2	SV Muttenz

FC Emmen win 3–2 on aggregate and continue to the finals.

Team 1	Score	Team 2
FC Emmenbrücke	0–1	FC Laufen
FC Laufen	4–1	FC Emmenbrücke

FC Laufen win 5–1 on aggregate and continue to the finals.

==== Final round ====
Team 1	Score	Team 2
FC Bulle	3–0	FC Emmen
FC Emmen	0–0	FC Bulle

FC Bulle win 3–0 on aggregate and are promoted to 1980–81 Nationalliga B. FC Emmen remain in the division.

Team 1	Score	Team 2
FC Laufen	A–A	Mendrisiostar
Mendrisiostar	1–2	FC Laufen
FC Laufen	0–3	Mendrisiostar

1st match abandoned after 6' due to rainfall: replay June 29 in Laufen. Mendrisiostar win 4–2 on aggregate and are promoted to 1980–81 Nationalliga B. FC Laufen remain in the division.

== Swiss Cup ==
=== Early rounds ===
The routes of the finalists to the final were:

- Round of 32: Bern-Sion 2:3 (a.e.t.). Estavayer-le-Lac-YB 0:1.
- Round of 16: GC-Sion 3:3 (a.e.t.) 4:5 (p). YB-Basel 2:0.
- Quarter-finals: Sion-Luzern 4:1. Chênois-YB 0:1.
- Semi-finals: Sion-Servette 2:1. Neuchâtel Xamax-YB 0:1.

=== Final ===
Whit Monday 26 May 1980.

Sion	2–1	Young Boys
Balet 8'; Mathez 62'	Report	10' >Schönenberger

Wankdorf Stadium, Bern
Attendance: 45,000
Referee: (Switzerland) Otto Isler, (Zürich)

== Swiss League Cup ==
=== Early rounds ===
The routes of the finalists to the final were:

- Round 1: Servette-Sion 1:0. Lerchenfeld-Grasshopper Club 1:6
- Round 2: FC Bern-Servette 0:3. Frauenfeld-Grasshopper Club 1:2
- Quarter-finals: BSC Young Boys-Servette 0:2. Lausanne-Sports-Grasshopper Club 1:2.
- Semi-finals: Servette-Luzern 6:0. Grasshopper Club-FC Zürich 2:1.

=== Final ===
6 May 1980

Servette	3–0	Grasshopper Club
Cucinotta 12'; Schnyder 46'; Barberis 49'	RSSSF

Gurzelen Stadion, Biel/Bienne
Attendance: 7,700
Referee: (Switzerland) Werner Bösch (Sulz)

== Swiss Clubs in Europe ==
- Servette as 1978–79 Nationalliga A champions: 1979–80 European Cup
- Young Boys as Swiss Cup finalist: 1979–80 European Cup Winners' Cup
- Zürich as league runners-up: 1979–80 UEFA Cup and entered 1979 Intertoto Cup
- Grasshopper Club as league third placed team: 1979–80 UEFA Cup and entered 1979 Intertoto Cup
- St. Gallen: entered 1979 Intertoto Cup
- CS Chênois: entered 1979 Intertoto Cup

=== Servette ===
==== European Cup ====
===== First round =====
19 September 1979 First leg	Servette (Switzerland)	3–1	(Belgium) Beveren	Stade des Charmilles, Geneve
	Van Genechten 2' (o.g.); Coutaz 65'; Hamberg 80'	Report	Janssens 5'	Attendance: 16,605; Referee: Antonin Vencl (Czechoslovakia)

3 October 1979 Second leg	Beveren (Belgium)	1–1	(Switzerland) Servette	Freethiel Stadion, Beveren
	Albert 18' (pen.)	Report	Barberis 37'	Attendance: 11,000; Referee: Clive White (England)

Servette won 4–2 on aggregate.

===== Second round =====
24 October 1979 First leg	BFC Dynamo (East Germany)	2–1	(Switzerland) Servette	Friedrich-Ludwig-Jahn-Stadion, East Berlin
	Pelka 8'; Netz 10'	Report	Cucinotta 65'	Attendance: 25,000; Referee: Bob Valentine (Scotland)

7 November 1979 Second leg	Servette (Switzerland)	2–2	(East Germany) BFC Dynamo	Charmilles Stadium, Geneva
	Hamberg 83'; Barberis 90'	Report	Brillat 33'; Terletzki 81'	Attendance: 20,000; Referee: Alek Jarguz (Poland)

BFC Dynamo won 4–3 on aggregate.

=== Young Boys ===
==== Cup Winners' Cup ====
===== First round =====
19 September 1979 First leg	Young Boys (Switzerland)	2–2	(Romania) Steaua București	Wankdorf, Bern
	Zwygart 42' (pen.); Schönenberger 78'		Stoica 38'; Iordănescu 44'	Attendance: 7,000; Referee: Sándor Kuti (Hungary)

3 October 1979 Second leg	Steaua București (Romania)	6–0	(Switzerland) Young Boys	Stadionul Steaua, Bucharest
	Nițu 1'; Sameș 7', 65'; Aelenei 47'; Răducanu 56'; Zahiu 72'			Attendance: 6,700; Referee: Talal Tokat (Turkey)

Steaua București won 8–2 on aggregate.

=== Zürich ===
==== UEFA Cup ====
===== First round =====
19 September 1979 First leg	Zürich (Switzerland)	1–3	(West Germany) Kaiserslautern	Letzigrund, Zürich
	Zwicker 83'	Report	Neues 20' (pen.); Bongartz 82'; Wolf 85'	Attendance: 18,000; Referee: Alexis Ponnet (Belgium)

3 October 1979 Second leg	Kaiserslautern (West Germany)	5–1	(Switzerland) Zürich	Fritz-Walter-Stadion, Kaiserslautern
	Melzer 15', 46'; Kaminke 29'; Wendt 54'; Geye 85'	Report	Zappa 16'	Attendance: 14,160; Referee: Bob Valentine (Scotland)

Kaiserslautern won 8–2 on aggregate.

==== Intertoto Cup ====
===== Group 4 =====
Matches

30 June 1979 Round 1	Bohemians Prague (Czechoslovakia)	2–2	Zürich	Prague
	Tichý 19' (1:1); Nemec 53' (2:1)	FCZ summary	12' (0:1) Risi; 87' (2:2) Botteron	Attendance: 3,000; Referee: (Czechoslovakia) Jaromír Fausek

7 July 1979 Round 2	Zürich	1–0	IFK Göteborg	Eschenbach, St. Gallen
	Seiler 73' (1:0)	FCZ summary	(yellow card) 63' Karlsson	Attendance: 1,300; Referee: (Switzerland) Peter Scherz (Aegerten)

14 July 1979 Round 3	Zürich	4–3	(Denmark) Odense	Dulliken
	Seiler 5' (1:0); Jerković 14' (2:0); Jerković 26' (3:1); Jerković 77' (4:3)	FCZ summary	23' (pen. 2:1) Eriksen; 41' (3:2) Eriksen; 44' (3:3) Munk Nielsen	Attendance: 2,000; Referee: (Switzerland) Franz Gächter (Suhr, Aargau)

21 July 1979 Round 4	Zürich	1–2	(Czechoslovakia) Bohemians Prague	Allmend, Horgen
	Zwicker 68' (1:1)	FCZ summary	49' (0:1) Tichý; (yellow card) 72' Roubícek; (yellow card) 81' Panenka; 82' (1:2) Nemec	Attendance: 3,000; Referee: (Switzerland) Meier

28 July 1979 Round 5	Odense (Denmark)	3–0	Zürich	Fionia Park, Odense
	Eriksen 10' (1:0); Eriksen 28' (2:0); Andersen (yellow card) 54'; Eriksen 67' (3:0)	FCZ summary	(yellow card) 67' Lüdi; (yellow card) 67' Baur	Attendance: 1,500; Referee: (Denmark) Sörensen

4 August 1979 Round 6	IFK Göteborg	5–1	Zürich	Göteborg
	Holm 10' (pen. 1:0); Holmgren 34' (2:0); Nilsson 38' (3:0); Nilsson 45' (4:0); Holmgren 54' (5:0); Olausson (yellow card)	FCZ summary	75' (5:1) Zwicker; (yellow card) Baur; (yellow card) Chapuisat; (yellow card) Zwicker; (yellow card) Seiler; (yellow card) Zappa	Attendance: 3,289; Referee: (Sweden) Per-Arne Morin

Final table

Pos	Team	Pld	W	D	L	GF	GA	GD	Pts	B05	GÖT	ZÜR	OB
1	(Czechoslovakia) Bohemians Prague	6	4	1	1	13	10	+3	9	—	3–2	2–2	4–1
2	(Sweden) IFK Göteborg	6	3	1	2	19	8	+11	7	4–0	—	5–1	6–1
3	(Switzerland) Zürich	6	2	1	3	9	15	−6	5	1–2	1–0	—	4–3
4	(Denmark) Odense	6	1	1	4	10	18	−8	3	0–2	2–2	3–0	—

Source: mogiel.net
Rules for classification: 1) Points; 2) Goal difference; 3) Goals scored; 4) Head-to-head points; 5) Away goals scored; 6) Draw.

=== Grasshopper Club ===
==== UEFA Cup ====
===== First round =====
26 September 1979 First leg	Progrès Niederkorn (Luxembourg)	0–2	(Switzerland) Grasshopper Club	Stade du Thillenberg, Differdange
		Report	Hermann 53'; Egli 79'	Attendance: 2,500; Referee: Alain Delmer (France)

3 October 1979 Second leg	Grasshopper Club (Switzerland)	4–0	(Luxembourg) Progrès Niederkorn	Hardturm, Zürich
	Ponte 15'; Pfister 29'; Egli 36'; Hermann 86'	Report		Attendance: 3,900; Referee: Richard Casha (Malta)

Grasshopper Club won 6–0 on aggregate.

===== Second round =====
24 October 1979 First leg	Grasshopper Club (Switzerland)	0–0	(England) Ipswich Town	Hardturm, Zürich
		Report		Attendance: 16,000; Referee: Roger Schoeters (Belgium)

7 November 1979 Second leg	Ipswich Town (England)	1–1	(Switzerland) Grasshopper Club	Portman Road, Ipswich
	Beattie 43'	Report	Sulser 69'	Attendance: 19,574; Referee: Klaus Scheurell (East Germany)

1–1 on aggregate; Grasshopper Club won on away goals.

===== Third round =====
28 November 1979 First leg	Grasshopper Club (Switzerland)	0–2	(West Germany) Stuttgart	Hardturm, Zürich
		Report	Klotz 14'; Hadewicz 79'	Attendance: 29,450; Referee: Vojtech Christov (Czechoslovakia)

12 December 1979 Second leg	Stuttgart (West Germany)	3–0	(Switzerland) Grasshopper Club	Neckarstadion, Stuttgart
	Müller 4'; Martin 35'; Kelsch 59'	Report		Attendance: 58,000; Referee: Jan Beck (Netherlands)

Stuttgart won 5–0 on aggregate.

==== Intertoto Cup ====
===== Group 2 =====
Pos	Team	Pld	W	D	L	GF	GA	GD	Pts	GCZ	VEJ	ANT	DUI
1	(Switzerland) Grasshopper Club	6	3	1	2	9	10	−1	7	—	1–4	2–1	2–2
2	(Denmark) Vejle	6	2	2	2	10	7	+3	6	2–0	—	1–2	1–2
3	(Belgium) Royal Antwerp	6	2	2	2	11	11	0	6	1–2	2–2	—	3–1
4	(West Germany) Duisburg	6	1	3	2	7	9	−2	5	0–1	0–0	2–2	—

Source: mogiel.net
Rules for classification: 1) Points; 2) Goal difference; 3) Goals scored; 4) Head-to-head points; 5) Away goals scored; 6) Draw.

=== St. Gallen ===
==== Intertoto Cup ====
===== Group 3 =====
Pos	Team	Pld	W	D	L	GF	GA	GD	Pts	EIN	MAL	SLA	STG
1	(West Germany) Eintracht Braunschweig	6	4	2	0	15	7	+8	10	—	3–1	2–0	3–2
2	(Sweden) Malmö FF	6	4	1	1	13	9	+4	9	2–2	—	3–1	2–1
3	(Czechoslovakia) Slavia Prague	6	2	1	3	6	9	−3	5	1–1	1–3	—	2–0
4	(Switzerland) St. Gallen	6	0	0	6	5	14	−9	0	1–4	1–2	0–1	—

Source: mogiel.net
Rules for classification: 1) Points; 2) Goal difference; 3) Goals scored; 4) Head-to-head points; 5) Away goals scored; 6) Draw.

=== Chênois ===
==== Intertoto Cup ====
===== Group 6 =====
Pos	Team	Pld	W	D	L	GF	GA	GD	Pts	BRN	SLA	CHÊ	LIN
1	(Czechoslovakia) Zbrojovka Brno	6	5	0	1	19	5	+14	10	—	3–1	3–1	3–0
2	(Bulgaria) Slavia Sofia	6	4	1	1	15	6	+9	9	2–0	—	2–0	4–1
3	(Switzerland) Chênois	6	1	1	4	7	17	−10	3	1–7	2–2	—	3–0
4	(Austria) LASK	6	1	0	5	4	17	−13	2	0–3	0–4	3–0	—

Source: mogiel.net
Rules for classification: 1) Points; 2) Goal difference; 3) Goals scored; 4) Head-to-head points; 5) Away goals scored; 6) Draw.

== Sources ==
- Switzerland 1979–80 at RSSSF
- Swiss League Cup at RSSSF
- European Competitions 1979–80 at RSSSF.com
- Cup finals at Fussball-Schweiz
- Intertoto history at Pawel Mogielnicki's Page
- Josef Zindel (2018). FC Basel 1893. Die ersten 125 Jahre (in German). Basel: Friedrich Reinhardt Verlag. ISBN 978-3-7245-2305-5.

Preceded by 1978–79	Seasons in Swiss football	Succeeded by 1980–81
