= Hansruedi Schär =

Swiss footballer (born 1957)

Personal information
- Full name: Hansruedi Schär
- Date of birth: 3 August 1957 (age 69)
- Place of birth: Olten, Switzerland
- Position: Midfielder

Youth career
- until 1977: FC Oensingen

Senior career*
Years	Team	Apps	(Gls)
1977–1982	FC Basel	58	(4)
1981–1982	→ FC Nordstern Basel (loan)	19	(1)
1982–1989	FC Aarau	170	(18)
- * Club domestic league appearances and goals

Hansruedi Schär (born 3 August 1957) is a Swiss retired footballer who played as midfielder in the 1970s and 1980s.

Born in Olten, Schär played his youth football on the local club in Oensingen. Schär joined Basel's first team for their 1977–78 season under head-coach Helmut Benthaus. After playing in one test match, Schär played his domestic league debut for his new club in the away game on 11 December 1977 as Basel won 5–4 against Young Boys. He scored his first goal for the club on 4 March 1978 in the home game at the St. Jakob Stadium as Basel played against Sion. Schärär scored the first goal of the match, Peter Ramseier added another, and Roland Schönenberger scored a hat-trick as Basel won 5–0.

The 1979–80 Nationalliga A season was an exciting season. After the qualifying phase, Servette, Grasshopper Club, and Basel were within three points of each other. The close rivalry remained until the end of the season. In the second-to-last game, Basel hosted Servette, winning 1–0. In the last match of the season, Basel were away against Zürich. Winning 4–2, Basel became champions and were two points ahead of both Grasshoppers and Servette, who finished second and third respectively.

One test match in the pre-season 1980–81 must receive a mention here. This being the final to the pre-season Philips Cup tournament that took place on 19 August 1980 in the Wankdorf Stadium in Bern. Basel played Zürich and were leading 2–1 just before half-time. Then came Hansruedi Schär's goal-scoring momentum. In the 43', 46' and 58' he scored a hat-trick, and Basel won 7–2. This was the first and only match in his career that he scored more than one goal in a game.

For the greater part of the 1981–82 Nationalliga A season, Schär was loaned to local rivals Nordstern Basel, but they suffered relegation despite this reinforcement. Schär stayed with Basel until the early part of the 1982–83 Nationalliga A season.

Between the years 1977 and 1982, Schär played a total of 117 games for Basel, scoring a total of 12 goals. 58 of these games were in the Nationalliga A, 13 were in the Swiss Cup and Swiss League Cup, eight were in the European competitions (European Cup, UEFA Cup, and Cup of the Alps), and 38 were friendly games. He scored four goals in the domestic league; the other eight were scored during the test games.

During the 1982–83 season, Schär moved on to Aarau, where he stayed until the end of his active playing career.

== Sources ==
- Rotblau: Jahrbuch Saison 2017/2018. Publisher: FC Basel Marketing AG. ISBN 978-3-7245-2189-1
- Die ersten 125 Jahre. Publisher: Josef Zindel im Friedrich Reinhardt Verlag, Basel. ISBN 978-3-7245-2305-5
- Verein "Basler Fussballarchiv" Homepage
