= Silvan Corbat =

Swiss footballer (born 1958)

Personal information
- Full name: Silvan Corbat
- Date of birth: 24 January 1958 (age 68)
- Place of birth: Switzerland
- Position: Midfielder

Senior career*
Years	Team	Apps	(Gls)
1976–1977	FC Laufen		
1977–1979	FC Basel	5	(1)
1979–1980	FC Laufen		
- * Club domestic league appearances and goals

Silvan Corbat (born 24 January 1958) is a Swiss retired footballer who played in the 1970s as midfielder.

Corbat joined FC Basel's first team from FC Laufen in their 1977–78 season under head-coach Helmut Benthaus. In his first season with the club Corbat played only one Swiss League Cup match. The following season after playing in two games in the Cup of the Alps and one test game, Corbat played his domestic league debut for the club in the home game in the St. Jakob Stadium on 19 August 1978. He scored his first goal for his club in the same game. It was the first goal of the match as Basel drew 2–2 with Young Boys.

Between the years 1977 and 1979 Corbat played a total of 10 games for Basel scoring that one goal. Five of these games were in the Nationalliga A, one in the Swiss Cup, one in the Swiss League Cup, two in the Cup of the Alps and one was test game.

Following his time with Basel, Corbat returned to his club of origin FC Laufen.

== Sources ==
- Die ersten 125 Jahre. Publisher: Josef Zindel im Friedrich Reinhardt Verlag, Basel. ISBN 978-3-7245-2305-5
- Verein "Basler Fussballarchiv" Homepage
