= Rolf Bucher =

Swiss footballer (born 1957)

Personal information
- Full name: Rolf Bucher
- Date of birth: 1957 (age 68–69)
- Position: Midfielder

Senior career*
Years	Team	Apps	(Gls)
1975–1978	FC Basel	11	(0)
1978–1979	FC Grenchen	7	(0)
- * Club domestic league appearances and goals

Rolf Bucher (born in 1957) is a Swiss retired footballer who played in the 1970s. He played mainly as midfielder.

Bucher came from their youth team and joined FC Basel's first team in their 1975–76 season under head-coach Helmut Benthaus. After playing in three test games, Bucher played his domestic league debut for the club in the away game on 8 May 1976 as Basel were defeated 1–5 by Sion. Bucher played mainly with the reserve team this and in the next season, in which he also played two games in the Cup of the Alps and three test games.

In Basel's 1977–78 season Bucher was mainly on the substitute bench. He played one game over 90 minutes and was substituted in on a number of occasions. Between the years 1975 and 1978 Bucher played a total of 27 games for Basel, without scoring a goal. 11 of these games were in the Nationalliga A, one in the Swiss League Cup, two in the Cup of the Alps and 13 were friendly games.

After his time with Basel Bucher moved on to play for Grenchen in the National B, the second tier of Swiss football.

== Sources ==
- Die ersten 125 Jahre. Publisher: Josef Zindel im Friedrich Reinhardt Verlag, Basel. ISBN 978-3-7245-2305-5
- Verein "Basler Fussballarchiv" Homepage
