= Jean-Claude Milani =

Swiss footballer (born 1959)

Personal information
- Date of birth: 5 July 1959 (age 67)
- Place of birth: Onex, Switzerland
- Height: 1.91 m (6 ft 3 in)
- Position: Goalkeeper

Senior career*
Years	Team	Apps	(Gls)
1978–1981	Servette	14	(0)
1981–1988	Lausanne-Sport	188	(0)
1988	Nantes	4	(0)
1989	Neuchâtel Xamax	10	(0)
- * Club domestic league appearances and goals

Jean-Claude Milani (born 5 July 1959) is a Swiss former professional footballer who played as a goalkeeper.

== Career ==
In 1978, Milani signed for Swiss side Servette, where he made 14 league appearances and scored 0 goals. On 13 June 1979, he debuted for Servette during a 4–1 loss to FC Basel. In 1988, Milani signed for Nantes in the French Ligue 1. Before the second half of 1988–89, he signed for Swiss club Neuchâtel Xamax.
