= Angelo Elia =

Swiss footballer (born 1957)

Personal information
- Date of birth: 26 August 1957 (age 69)
- Place of birth: Magliaso, Switzerland
- Position: Forward

Youth career
- 1970–1973: Magliaso
- 1973–1974: Agno
- 1974: Lugano

Senior career*
Years	Team	Apps	(Gls)
1974–1978	Lugano		
1978–1979	Servette	16	(4)
1979–1981	Lugano	50	(14)
1981–1984	Servette	87	(30)
1985–1989	Lugano		

International career
1975–1976	Switzerland U18	1	(0)
1981–1982	Switzerland	5	(1)
- * Club domestic league appearances and goals

Angelo Elia (born 26 August 1957) is a Swiss former footballer who played as a forward for Lugano and Servette in the 1970s and 80s.

== Early life ==
The son of a former footballer and policeman, Elia grew up in Brissago. He started playing football in Magliaso in 1970, before moving to Agno three years later.

== Club career ==
Born in Magliaso, only a couple of villages away and just a short distance from Lugano, Elia joined Lugano's first team as a 17-year-old for their 1974–75 Nationalliga A season, under head coach Alfredo Foni. In the 1975–76 season he was called up for the Switzerland under-18 national team and made one appearance for them.

In July 1978 Elia moved to Servette under head coach Péter Pázmándy. He scored his first goal for his new team on 26 August 1978 as Servette played at home in the Charmilles Stadium against Basel. It was the last goal of the game as Servette won 6–0 against their opponents. That season Elia won the treble with his new team (League, Swiss Cup and League Cup). Elia is also known from Servette's run in the 1978–79 European Cup Winners' Cup, where he scored as the team eliminated AS Nancy to reach the quarter-finals, also scoring two goals against PAOK. He suffered a muscle tear and spent four months in hospital.

Elia returned to Lugano after that season and played two years for them. However, he returned to Servette in the summer of 1981, signing a five-year contract. Here he became regular player and achieved a cup victory in 1984 and the 1984–85 Nationalliga A title, albeit he left Servette to return to Lugano during the 1984–85 season.

== International career ==
After one appearance in the Switzerland under-18 national team, he was capped five times for Switzerland. Elia scored in a 2–1 victory over the Netherlands in 1981, a result Switzerland did not manage to repeat until 2007. In total, he made 30 appearances for youth teams of Switzerland.

== Style of play ==
Elia's strengths were acceleration, ball control and being able to "instinctively anticipate[] attacking moves", while passing was a weakness.

== Personal life ==
Elia worked as a teacher and studied psychology and pedagogy.

== Honours ==
Servette

- Swiss championship: 1978–79, 1984–85
- Swiss Cup: 1978–79, 1983–84
- League Cup: 1978–79
