= Peter Mast =

Swiss footballer (born 1957)

Personal information
- Date of birth: 23 January 1957 (age 69)
- Position: Defender

Senior career*
Years	Team	Apps	(Gls)
1976–1978	BSC Young Boys		
1978–1979	FC Bern		
1979–1980	FC Chiasso		
- * Club domestic league appearances and goals

Peter Mast (born 23 January 1957) is a retired Swiss football defender.
