= Roger Ries =

Swiss footballer (born 1951)

Personal information
- Date of birth: 30 November 1951 (age 74)
- Place of birth: Switzerland
- Position: Striker

Senior career*
Years	Team	Apps	(Gls)
1972–1974	FC Basel	5	(0)
1974–1976	FC Fribourg	19	(2)
1975–1976	→ FC Nordstern Basel (loan)	20	(13)
1976–1978	FC St. Gallen	61	(12)
1978–1981	FC Nordstern Basel	66	(23)
- * Club domestic league appearances and goals

Roger Ries (born 30 November 1951) is a Swiss retired footballer who played in the 1970s and early 1980s as a striker.

Ries joined Basel's first team in for their 1972–73 season under head-coach Helmut Benthaus. After one test match Ries played his debut for the club in the home game in the St. Jakob Stadium on 17 December 1972 in the Swiss Cup quarter-final as Basel played against Chiasso. He scored his first goal for his club in the same game as Basel won 5–3. It was the first goal of the match. Ries played his domestic league debut for the club in the away game on 11 March 1973 as Basel played a goalless draw against Servette.

Between the years 1972 and 1974 Ries played a total of nine games for Basel scoring only the afore mentioned goal. Five of these games were in the Nationalliga A, one in the Swiss Cup, one in the Cup of the Alps and two were friendly games.

Following his time with Basel, Ries moved on to Fribourg for two seasons, the second of which he spent on loan with Nordstern Basel. He then transferred to FC St. Gallen for two seasons before he moved on again to Nordstern Basel for the 1978–79 Nationalliga A season. Although the team were relegated he stayed with the club.

In the 1979–80 season Ries and Nordstern won promotion from the Nationalliga B, the team scoring 63 goals in their 26 matches. Ries was the league best goal scorer with 17 goals, his teammate Helmuth Degen was the team's second-best goal scorer, the league goal scorer number four, with 12 goals, their young teammate Ruedi Zbinden was the team's third best scorer, the league's sixth, with 11 goals.

Ries stayed with Nordstern one more season and then retired from active football.

== Sources ==
- Roger Ries at WorldFootball.net
- Die ersten 125 Jahre. Publisher: Josef Zindel im Friedrich Reinhardt Verlag, Basel. ISBN 978-3-7245-2305-5
- Verein "Basler Fussballarchiv" Homepage
