= Roger Wehrli (footballer) =

Swiss footballer (born 1956)

Personal information
- Date of birth: 18 March 1956 (age 70)
- Height: 1.76 m (5 ft 9 in)
- Position: Midfielder

Senior career*
Years	Team	Apps	(Gls)
1974–1975	FC Baden		
1975–1977	FC Winterthur		
1977–1985	Grasshoppers		
1985–1990	FC Luzern		
1990–1992	FC Aarau		
1992–1993	FC Suhr		
1996–1997	FC Suhr		

International career
1978–1989	Switzerland	68	(0)

Managerial career
- 1990–1991: FC Aarau (player-manager)
- 1996–1997: FC Suhr (player-manager)
- * Club domestic league appearances and goals

Roger Wehrli (born 18 March 1956) is a Swiss former professional football player and manager who played as a midfielder.
