= Jakob Brechbühl =

Swiss footballer (1952–2026)

Personal information
- Date of birth: 29 January 1952
- Date of death: 1 October 2026 (aged 74)
- Height: 1.68 m (5 ft 6 in)
- Position: Defender

Senior career*
Years	Team	Apps	(Gls)
1971–1983	Young Boys	263	(16)
Total		263	(16)

International career
1976–1979	Switzerland	20	(0)
- * Club domestic league appearances and goals

Jakob Brechbühl (29 January 1952 – 1 October 2026) was a Swiss professional footballer who played as a defender.

Brechbühl played in 20 matches for the Switzerland national team and won the 1977 Swiss Cup with BSC Young Boys.

Brechbühl died on 1 October 2026, at the age of 74.
