= Piet Hamberg =

Dutch footballer and manager

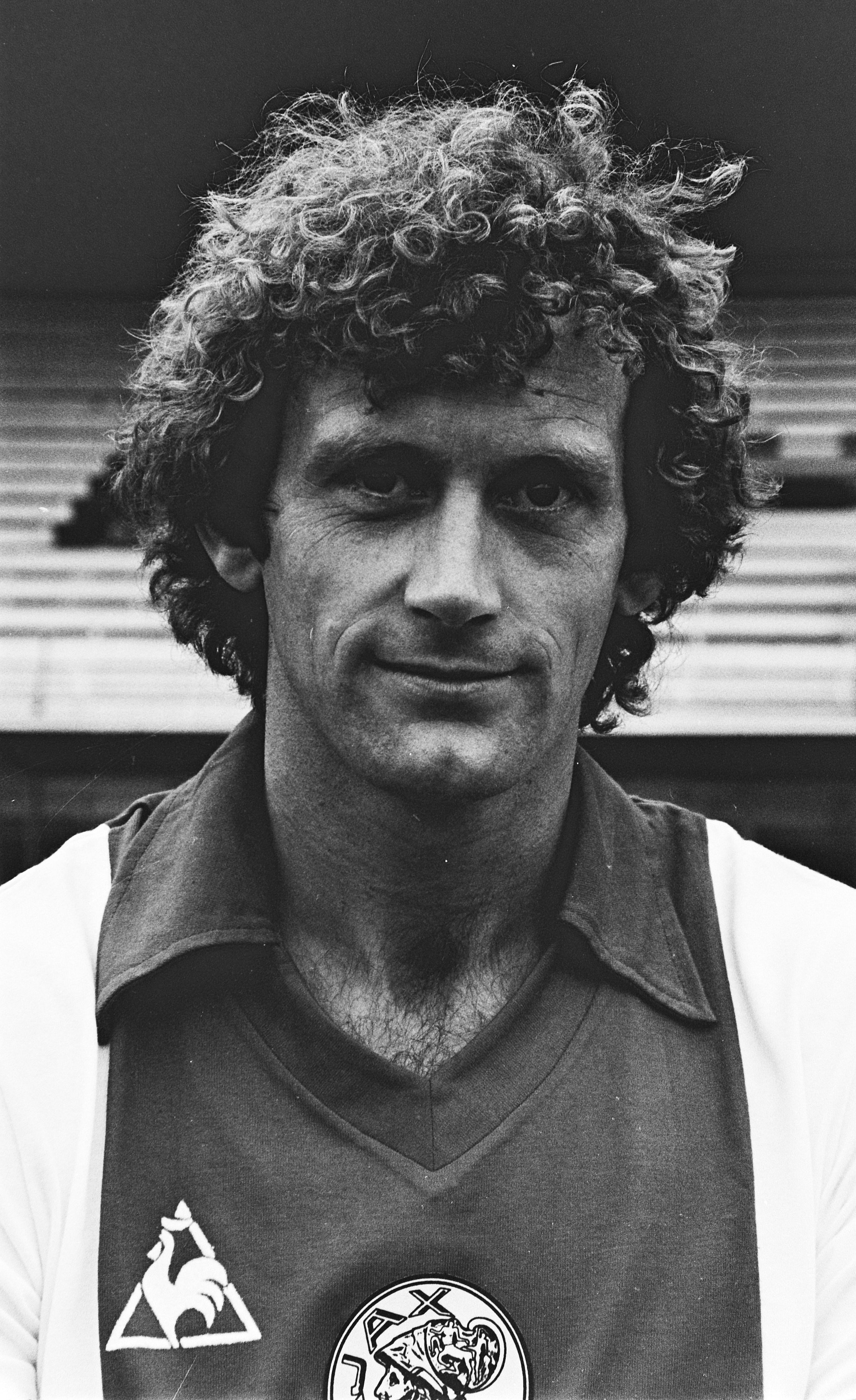
- Hamberg with Ajax in 1980

Personal information
- Date of birth: 22 January 1954 (age 72)
- Place of birth: Winschoten, Netherlands
- Height: 1.85 m (6 ft 1 in)
- Position: Midfielder

Youth career
- BNC

Senior career*
Years	Team	Apps	(Gls)
1973–1974	NEC	1	(0)
1974–1976	Wageningen	66	(11)
1976–1978	Utrecht	55	(11)
1978–1980	Servette	56	(28)
1980–1982	Ajax	18	(4)
Total		196	(54)

International career
1972	Netherlands U19	4	(1)

Managerial career
- 1992–1993: IJsselmeervogels
- 1994–1995: Groningen (assistant)
- 1995–1998: Grasshopper (assistant)
- 1998–1999: Saudi Arabia U20
- 1999–2002: Al-Ahly
- 2000–2002: Grasshopper (head of academy)
- 2003–2004: Al Dhafra
- 2004–2006: Al Jazira
- 2006: Togo (assistant)
- 2006–2007: Liverpool (head of academy)
- 2007–2009: Grasshopper (head of academy)
- 2009–2010: ES Sahel
- 2012: Red Bull Salzburg (assistant)
- 2012–2013: Red Bull Salzburg (scout)
- 2013–2015: ES Sahel (head of academy)
- 2015–2019: Al Jazira (assistant)
- 2019–2020: Al-Ittihad (assistant)
- * Club domestic league appearances and goals

Piet Hamberg (born 22 January 1954) is a Dutch retired footballer and manager. He worked at Liverpool as technical manager for their academy.

== Playing career ==
Born and raised in Finsterwolde, Hamberg began his youth career with local amateur side BNC and then Groningen. During his playing career, Hamberg represented NEC, Wageningen, Utrecht, Servette and Ajax.

During a European Cup clash in Madrid his knee was injured, and it took him quite a while to get fit. Once he was declared fit to play, the same knee was injured in a match against PSV and he was sidelined for quite a period yet again, and eventually an Achilles tendon injury ended his career as a player. In 1988, Hamberg was one of the players investigated by the Dutch tax authority in a black money (tax evasion) scandal surrounding Ajax.

=== International ===
Hamberg played 4 matches for the Netherlands national under-19 football team. Hamberg was a substitute in one match for Netherlands national football team, but was unavailable for further selection due to the Achilles tendon injury that ended his career.

== Managerial career ==
After his playing career, Hamberg became a coach and worked in Saudi Arabia, Libya, the United Arab Emirates and Togo. He led the Saudi Arabia under-20 team toward the World Cup before becoming a manager at Libyan club Al-Ahly. In 2003, he replaced fellow Dutch manager Jan Versleijen at Al-Jazira Club in the United Arab Emirates. For Togo he was the assistant to manager Otto Pfister at their 2006 FIFA World Cup campaign. However, Hamberg and Pfister stepped back from their position after it was announced that their players had not received any promised money for qualifying for the World Cup. Eventually Pfister returned before their World Cup opener against South Korea, but Hamberg decided not to and told the press he is a man of his words. In between he was manager and technical director of Grasshopper Club Zürich in two different stints between 1997 and April 2007. As a result of his successes, Hamberg became known as one of the best youth developers in the world, leading to his appointment as technical manager for Liverpool F.C. Academy in July 2007. His successes continued at Liverpool, as he groomed six youth international players and guided the under-18 team to the Football Association Youth Cup Final.

On 11 May, Liverpool announced that Hamberg was to leave the club at the end of the season. No reason was given for his departure. On 22 December 2009, he became the manager of Tunisian club ES Sahel, until 15 April 2010. Later on, he was part of a FIFA delegation to analyse the state of football in Suriname and worked as an assistant coach and scout at Red Bull Salzburg, then he returned to ES Sahel to work as the head of youth department for two years. Afterwards, he worked as an assistant coach at Al Jazira and Al-Ittihad with Henk ten Cate.

== Honours ==
Servette

- Swiss Super League: 1978–79
- Swiss Cup: 1978–79
- Swiss League Cup: 1979
- Coppa delle Alpi: 1979

Ajax

- Eredivisie: 1981–82

Individual

- Swiss Foreign Footballer of the Year: 1979–80
