= 1978 Intertoto Cup =

Tournament details
- Teams: 36

Final positions
- Champions: Group winners Duisburg; Slavia Prague; Hertha Berlin; Eintracht Braunschweig; Malmö FF; Lokomotíva Košice; Tatran Prešov; GAK

Tournament statistics
- Matches played: 108

In the 1978 Intertoto Cup no knock-out rounds were contested, and therefore no winner was declared.

== Group stage ==
The 36 teams were divided into nine groups of four teams each.

=== Group 1 ===
Pos	Team	Pld	W	D	L	GF	GA	GD	Pts	DUI	B05	RWI	NOR
1	(West Germany) Duisburg	6	3	3	0	9	4	+5	9	—	2–1	3–0	1–1
2	(Czechoslovakia) Bohemians	6	1	4	1	5	5	0	6	1–1	—	1–1	1–1
3	(Austria) Rapid Wien	6	1	3	2	6	8	−2	5	0–0	0–0	—	4–1
4	(Sweden) IFK Norrköping	6	1	2	3	7	10	−3	4	1–2	0–1	3–1	—

Source: mogiel.net
Rules for classification: 1) Points; 2) Goal difference; 3) Goals scored; 4) Head-to-head points; 5) Away goals scored; 6) Draw.

=== Group 2 ===
Pos	Team	Pld	W	D	L	GF	GA	GD	Pts	SLA	KAI	OB	WAC
1	(Czechoslovakia) Slavia Prague	6	6	0	0	21	8	+13	12	—	4–2	3–1	4–0
2	(West Germany) Kaiserslautern	6	4	0	2	18	10	+8	8	1–3	—	4–1	3–1
3	(Denmark) OB	6	1	0	5	8	16	−8	2	1–3	1–2	—	4–1
4	(Austria) SSW Innsbruck	6	1	0	5	8	21	−13	2	3–4	0–6	3–0	—

Source: mogiel.net
Rules for classification: 1) Points; 2) Goal difference; 3) Goals scored; 4) Head-to-head points; 5) Away goals scored; 6) Draw.

=== Group 3 ===
Pos	Team	Pld	W	D	L	GF	GA	GD	Pts	HER	SLA	KFF	VEJ
1	(West Germany) Hertha Berlin	6	4	1	1	12	3	+9	9	—	3–0	1–0	2–0
2	(Bulgaria) Slavia Sofia	6	2	3	1	9	7	+2	7	1–1	—	4–1	2–0
3	(Sweden) Kalmar FF	6	2	1	3	8	10	−2	5	2–1	1–1	—	3–0
4	(Denmark) Vejle	6	1	1	4	4	13	−9	3	0–4	1–1	3–1	—

Source: mogiel.net
Rules for classification: 1) Points; 2) Goal difference; 3) Goals scored; 4) Head-to-head points; 5) Away goals scored; 6) Draw.

=== Group 4 ===
Pos	Team	Pld	W	D	L	GF	GA	GD	Pts	EIN	STA	GCZ	B03
1	(West Germany) Eintracht Braunschweig	6	4	1	1	10	3	+7	9	—	0–1	0–0	5–1
2	(Belgium) Standard Liège	6	2	3	1	6	3	+3	7	0–1	—	0–0	3–0
3	(Switzerland) Grasshopper Club	6	1	3	2	4	5	−1	5	0–2	0–0	—	1–2
4	(Denmark) Boldklubben 1903	6	1	1	4	7	16	−9	3	1–2	2–2	1–3	—

Source: mogiel.net
Rules for classification: 1) Points; 2) Goal difference; 3) Goals scored; 4) Head-to-head points; 5) Away goals scored; 6) Draw.

=== Group 5 ===
Pos	Team	Pld	W	D	L	GF	GA	GD	Pts	MAL	ZÜR	MTA	FVI
1	(Sweden) Malmö FF	6	5	1	0	11	3	+8	11	—	2–0	3–1	2–1
2	(Switzerland) Zürich	6	3	0	3	6	7	−1	6	0–2	—	0–3	2–0
3	(Israel) Maccabi Tel Aviv	6	2	0	4	10	10	0	4	0–1	0–2	—	5–1
4	(Austria) First Vienna	6	1	1	4	6	13	−7	3	1–1	0–2	3–1	—

Source: mogiel.net
Rules for classification: 1) Points; 2) Goal difference; 3) Goals scored; 4) Head-to-head points; 5) Away goals scored; 6) Draw.

Matches

24 June 1978
Round 1

Maccabi Tel Aviv (Israel)	0–2	(Switzerland) Zürich
	FCZ summary	52' (0:1) Risi; 80' (0:2) Risi

Tel Aviv
Attendance: 2,500

1 July 1978
Round 2

Zürich (Switzerland)	0–2	(Sweden) Malmö FF
	FCZ summary	22' (0:1) Sjöberg; 82' (0:2) Sjöberg

Linthstrasse, Tuggen
Attendance: 2,000
Referee: (Switzerland) Rudolf Renggli (Luzern/Stans)

8 July 1978
Round 3

Zürich (Switzerland)	2–0	(Austria) First Vienna
Risi 58' (1:0); Scheiwiler 61' (2:0)	FCZ summary	(yellow card) Kuhnert

Stadion Kleinfeld, Kriens
Attendance: 1,200
Referee: (Switzerland) Jakob Baumann (Schaffhausen)

02 July 1978
Round 4

Malmö FF (Sweden)	2–0	(Switzerland) Zürich
Ljungberg 37' (1:0); Sjöberg 41' (2:0); Kristensson (red card)	FCZ summary

Malmö Stadion, Malmö
Attendance: 2,150
Referee: (Sweden) Erik Fredriksson

22 July 1978
Round 5

First Vienna (Austria)	0–2	(Switzerland) Zürich
	FCZ summary	35' (0:1) Risi; 89' (0:2) Botteron

Stadion Wiener Neustadt, Vienna
Attendance: 2,500
Referee: (Austria) Adolf Mathias

29 July 1978
Round 6

Zürich (Switzerland)	0–3	(Israel) Maccabi Tel Aviv
	FCZ summary	3' (0:1) Peretz; 25' (0:2) Tabak; 78' (0:3) Tabak

Letzigrund, Zürich
Attendance: 2,500
Referee: (Switzerland) Bruno Galler (Kirchdorf, Bern)

=== Group 6 ===
Pos	Team	Pld	W	D	L	GF	GA	GD	Pts	LKE	BRY	STU	SIO
1	(Czechoslovakia) Lokomotíva Košice	6	4	2	0	17	4	+13	10	—	2–1	4–0	5–0
2	(Norway) Bryne FK	6	3	2	1	10	5	+5	8	1–1	—	2–0	2–2
3	(Austria) Sturm Graz	6	2	0	4	4	11	−7	4	0–3	0–2	—	3–0
4	(Switzerland) Sion	6	0	2	4	4	15	−11	2	2–2	0–2	0–1	—

Source: mogiel.net
Rules for classification: 1) Points; 2) Goal difference; 3) Goals scored; 4) Head-to-head points; 5) Away goals scored; 6) Draw.

=== Group 7 ===
Pos	Team	Pld	W	D	L	GF	GA	GD	Pts	TAT	ESB	WSC	YB
1	(Czechoslovakia) Tatran Prešov	6	6	0	0	18	2	+16	12	—	4–2	6–0	1–0
2	(Denmark) Esbjerg	6	3	1	2	10	8	+2	7	0–2	—	3–1	3–0
3	(Austria) Wiener Sport-Club	6	1	1	4	3	15	−12	3	0–4	0–1	—	2–1
4	(Switzerland) Young Boys	6	0	2	4	2	8	−6	2	0–1	1–1	0–0	—

Source: mogiel.net
Rules for classification: 1) Points; 2) Goal difference; 3) Goals scored; 4) Head-to-head points; 5) Away goals scored; 6) Draw.

=== Group 8 ===
Pos	Team	Pld	W	D	L	GF	GA	GD	Pts	MNE	SLO	ELF	LIL
1	(Israel) Maccabi Netanya	6	3	3	0	16	8	+8	9	—	2–2	7–1	1–0
2	(Socialist Federal Republic of Yugoslavia) Sloboda Tuzla	6	3	2	1	12	9	+3	8	2–2	—	3–2	2–1
3	(Sweden) Elfsborg	6	2	2	2	11	15	−4	6	2–2	1–0	—	0–0
4	(Norway) Lillestrøm	6	0	1	5	6	13	−7	1	1–2	1–3	3–5	—

Source: mogiel.net
Rules for classification: 1) Points; 2) Goal difference; 3) Goals scored; 4) Head-to-head points; 5) Away goals scored; 6) Draw.

=== Group 9 ===
Pos	Team	Pld	W	D	L	GF	GA	GD	Pts	GRA	PIR	VOJ	STA
1	(Austria) GAK	6	4	0	2	15	9	+6	8	—	2–1	1–2	4–1
2	(Bulgaria) Pirin Blagoevgrad	6	3	1	2	9	7	+2	7	1–0	—	2–1	3–1
3	(Socialist Federal Republic of Yugoslavia) Vojvodina	6	3	0	3	13	11	+2	6	3–5	2–1	—	5–1
4	(Norway) Start	6	1	1	4	6	16	−10	3	1–3	1–1	1–0	—

Source: mogiel.net
Rules for classification: 1) Points; 2) Goal difference; 3) Goals scored; 4) Head-to-head points; 5) Away goals scored; 6) Draw.

== See also ==
- 1978–79 European Cup
- 1978–79 European Cup Winners' Cup
- 1978–79 UEFA Cup
