= Jörg Stohler =

Swiss footballer and manager (born 1973)

Personal information
- Full name: Jörg Stohler
- Date of birth: 27 August 1949 (age 77)
- Place of birth: Pratteln, Switzerland
- Height: 1.83 m (6 ft 0 in)
- Position: Defender

Youth career
- 1963–1967: FC Pratteln

Senior career*
Years	Team	Apps	(Gls)
1967–1969	FC Pratteln		
1970–1984	FC Basel		
1984–1986	FC Grenchen		
1988–1989	FC Münchenstein		

International career
1975–1980	Switzerland	10	(0)

Managerial career
- 1988–1989: FC Münchenstein
- 1996: FC Laufenburg
- * Club domestic league appearances and goals

Jörg Stohler (born 27 August 1949) is a Swiss former international footballer who played as a defender during the 1970s and 1980s. He played over 300 League Championship matches and won the Swiss League Championship four times. He also won the Swiss Cup, the Swiss League Cup and Coppa delle Alpi once. Stohler played ten games for the Swiss national team.

== Football career ==
Born in Pratteln, Stohler started his football in the youth system with local club Pratteln and as of 1967 played regularly for their first team. He moved to FC Basel in 1970.

Stohler was part of the team that completed a record run of 52 home games unbeaten in the St. Jakob Stadium between June 1968 and August 1972. On 30 July 1974 he scored the first goal in the Coppa delle Alpi Final, but Basel lost by 1–2 against Young Boys. He also scored a penalty in the Final of the same competition on 29 September 1981 as Basel won 5-3 on penalties after a 2-2 at full-time. In the Wankdorf Stadion in Bern on 11 June 1983 Stohler played his 300th league match.

At the end of his professional career, in the summer of 1984, Stohler moved to FC Grenchen and he played there for two years. Then for the season 1988/89 Stohler moved to FC Münchenstein in the 3. Liga (then the sixth tier of the Swiss Football League) and became their player-manager. This was a very successful move because at the end of the season the club was promoted to the 2. Liga.

During his time at FC Basel, Stohler played ten games for the Swiss national team between 1975 and 1980.

== Private life ==
Stohler did his apprenticeship as a construction mechanic. He worked in the local chemical industry, but since 2005 he is retired. Stohler is married and has two grown up children.

== Honours ==
Basel

- Swiss League championship winner: 1972, 1973, 1977, 1981
- Swiss Cup winner: 1975
- Swiss League Cup winner: 1973
- Alpencupsieger: 1981

Grenchen

- Promotion from the Nationalliga B to the Nationalliga A: 1985

Münchenstein

- Promotion to the 2. Liga: 1989
