= Charles Zwygart =

Swiss footballer (born 1958)

Personal information
- Date of birth: 12 November 1958 (age 67)
- Position: Midfielder

Senior career*
Years	Team	Apps	(Gls)
1975–1977	FC La Chaux-de-Fonds		
1977–1980	Young Boys		
1980–1983	Servette		
1983	Young Boys		
1983–1984	Neuchâtel Xamax		
1984–1985	FC La Chaux-de-Fonds		
1985–1987	FC Wettingen		
1987–1989	FC Martigny-Sports		

International career
- Switzerland U21
- * Club domestic league appearances and goals

Charles Zwygart (born 12 November 1958) is a Swiss former professional footballer who played as a midfielder.
