= Roland Schönenberger =

Swiss footballer (born 1955)

Personal information
- Full name: Roland Schönenberger
- Date of birth: 10 October 1955 (age 71)
- Place of birth: Wangen bei Olten, Switzerland
- Height: 1.71 m (5 ft 7 in)
- Position: Forward

Youth career
- until 1974: FC Wangen bei Olten

Senior career*
Years	Team	Apps	(Gls)
1974–1979	FC Basel	110	(41)
1979–1986	BSC Young Boys	182	(42)

International career
1977–1980	Switzerland	4	(0)
- * Club domestic league appearances and goals

Roland Schönenberger (born 10 October 1955) is a Swiss former footballer who played for FC Basel. He played as a forward.

== Club career ==
Schönenberger played his youth football with local club FC Wangen bei Olten. He joined Basel's first team under team manager Helmut Benthaus in their 1974–75 season. After two games in the Cup of the Alps and one in the Swiss League Cup, he made his domestic league debut for his new club in the home game at the St. Jakob Stadium on 17 August 1974 as Basel drew 2–2 draw with Xamax in the first game of the season. He scored his first goal for the club on 19 October that year as Basel won 3–0 at home to Vevey-Sports. In his first season, Basel ended the domestic league in fourth position, he played 19 league games scoring six goals. He played two Swiss Cup games; Basel won the Cup but Schönenberger did not figure in the final line up.

Basel finished the 1975–76 Nationalliga A in third position with 34 points, 10 points behind FC Zürich. Of the 26 games, 13 were won, 8 drawn, 5 lost, with 59 goals and 38 conceded. Schönenberger played in 24 matches, scored 10 goals, and was the team's top scorer. In the 1975–76 European Cup Winners' Cup he played both games as Basel were knocked out of the competition by Atlético Madrid. In the first leg he scored the opening goal in the third minute, but the team lost 2–1.

For Schönenberger the 1976–77 Nationalliga A was a very successful season. The league format was changed. Instead of 14 teams playing a single round robin, it now was reduced to 12 teams with a qualifying phase and a championship round within the top six teams. This meant no longer 26 games, but now 22 plus 10. Schönenberger did not play much in the first part of the season, but returned to playing as the winter ended. In the qualifying phase Basel obtained 33 points and were just two points behind Servette. They managed to close the gap in the championship round and because both teams were level on points the championship was decided in a play-off match. This match was held on 26 June 1977. Basel's goals were scored by Mundschin and von Wartburg as they won 2–1 and became Swiss champions. In the league Schönenberger only played 11 matches scoring three goals.

During Basel's 1977–78 season Schönenberger played 30 league games and netted 16 times. He was the team's top scorer and the team finished the championship in third position. They reached the semi-finals of both the national cup competitions but lost both. In the League Cup, Schönenberger played all four games and scored four goals. In the Swiss Cup, he played three games and also scored four goals. In the cup match on 12 October 1977 in the Letzigrund against Zürich Schönenberger scored a hat-trick as Basel won 3–1.

In their 1978–79 season Basel finished the qualification round in fourth position and after the final round they slipped to sixth position. Schönenberger played 26 league games and scored six times. In the qualification round match on 16 September 1978 against Xamax, he scored four goals as Basel won 5–2. However Detlev Lauscher became the team's top scorer with 14 goals. In the round of 32 in the Swiss Cup Basel were drawn away at lower tier FC Glattbrugg. Schönenberger scored a hat-trick within 23 minutes in the second half of the game as Basel won 7–0. In the League Cup Basel advanced to the final which was played on St. Jakob Stadium on 1 May 1979. Although their opponents, Servette, took an early two goal lead, Schönenberger scored twice and the game went into extra time. After 120 minutes the score remained 2–2 and it required a penalty shootout. Schönenberger missed with his attempt and Servette won the Cup.

Between 1974 and 1979 Schönenberger played 195 games for Basel and scored 80 goals; 110 games were in the Nationalliga A, 15 in the League Cup, 9 in the Swiss Cup, 2 in the European Cup, 1 in the UEFA Cup, 2 in the UEFA Cup Winners' Cup, 14 in the Cup of the Alps and 42 were friendlies. He scored 41 goals in the domestic league, 11 in the League Cup, 8 in the Swiss Cup, 4 in the European competitions and the other 16 in the test games.

After five seasons with Basel, Schönenberger moved on and signed with Young Boys. He stayed with them until he retired from active football in 1986. In his last season with Young Boys they won the 1985–86 Nationalliga A and were Swiss champions.

== International career ==
Schönenberger was called up for Switzerland for the first time in 1977 by national team manager Roger Vonlanthen. He made his debut for his country on 21 September 1977 in the friendly against Spain at the Wankdorf Stadium in Bern. He was substituted in to play for the second half of the game. He played his next game for his country in the starting eleven on 30 October 1977 in a 1978 World Cup qualifier. Switzerland won the game 1–0 against Norway but could not qualify for the World Cup.

Schönenberger was called up for his country again in 1980 by Léon Walker. He played two more matches in 1982 World Cup qualifying.

== Honours ==
Basel

- Swiss League: 1976–77
- Swiss Cup: 1974–75

Young Boys

- Swiss League: 1985–86

== Sources ==
- Rotblau: Jahrbuch Saison 2017/2018. Publisher: FC Basel Marketing AG. ISBN 978-3-7245-2189-1
- Die ersten 125 Jahre. Publisher: Josef Zindel im Friedrich Reinhardt Verlag, Basel. ISBN 978-3-7245-2305-5
- Verein "Basler Fussballarchiv" Homepage
