= Umberto Barberis =

Swiss footballer (born 1952)

Personal information
- Full name: Umberto Barberis
- Date of birth: 5 June 1952 (age 74)
- Place of birth: Sion, Switzerland
- Position: Winger

Youth career
- 1968–1970: Sion

Senior career*
| Years | Team | Apps | (Gls) |
| 1970–1975 | Sion | 106 | (18) |
| 1975–1976 | Grasshoppers | 25 | (8) |
| 1976–1980 | Servette | 125 | (50) |
| 1980–1983 | Monaco | 103 | (29) |
| 1983–1986 | Servette | 58 | (27) |

International career
| 1976–1985 | Switzerland | 54 | (7) |

Managerial career
- 1987–1993: Lausanne-Sport
- 1993–1994: Sion
- 1995–1996: Servette
- 2001–2002: Lausanne-Sport
- 2004–2007: Baulmes
- 2007: Lausanne-Sport
- 2008–2009: Sion
- 2009: KAC Kenitra
- 2011: Dubai Club (caretaker)
- * Club domestic league appearances and goals

Umberto Barberis (born 5 June 1952) is a Swiss former football coach and player.

== Playing career ==
=== Club ===
Barberis started his career in Switzerland, playing for FC Sion in his native town, and then for Grasshopper Zurich and Servette FC, winning the Swiss Super League and the Schweizer Cup in 1979. He left his country to play for Division 1 side AS Monaco FC where he was elected foreign player of the year by France Football magazine in 1981 and 1982, along with Andrzej Szarmach. In 1982, he also won the Division 1 title with AS Monaco FC.

=== International ===
He was capped 54 times and scored 7 goals.

== Honours ==
Individual

- Swiss Footballer of the Year: 1974–75, 1978–79 & 1979–80.
- French Football Foreign Footballer of the Year: 1981 & 1982.
- AS Monaco Club Top Goalscorer: 1982–83.

Team

- Swiss Super League: 1979, 1985
- Swiss Cup: 1974, 1978, 1979, 1984
- Swiss League Cup: 1975, 1977, 1979, 1980
- Coppa delle Alpi: 1976, 1978, 1983
- Ligue 1: 1982
- Coupe de France: 1980

== Coaching career ==
Barberis coached various Swiss sides such as FC Lausanne-Sport, FC Sion, Servette FC.

== Out of the pitch ==
Barberis was born in Switzerland to an Italian family. He is the father of footballer Sébastien Barberis.
