= Serge Trinchero =

Swiss/Italian footballer (born 1949)

Personal information
- Full name: Serge Trinchero
- Date of birth: 27 August 1949 (age 77)
- Place of birth: Biella, Italy
- Position: Defender

Senior career*
Years	Team	Apps	(Gls)
1968–1976	FC Sion		
1976–1980	Servette FC		
1980–1983	Neuchâtel Xamax	129	(16)
1983–1985	Martigny Sports		
1985–1986	Servette FC	2	(0)

International career
1974–1978	Switzerland	20	(2)
- * Club domestic league appearances and goals

Serge Trinchero (born 27 August 1949) is a retired Swiss/Italian footballer who played as a defender.
