= Raimondo Ponte =

Swiss footballer (born 1955)

Personal information
- Date of birth: 4 April 1955 (age 71)
- Place of birth: Windisch, Switzerland
- Position: Striker

Youth career
- –1970: Windisch
- 1970–1972: FC Aarau

Senior career*
Years	Team	Apps	(Gls)
1972–1974	FC Aarau		
1974–1980	Grasshoppers	127	(21)
1980–1981	Nottingham Forest	21	(3)
1981–1982	Bastia	29	(3)
1982–1988	Grasshoppers	156	(35)

International career
1978–1984	Switzerland	34	(2)

Managerial career
- 1988–1991: FC Baden
- 1993–1995: FC Baden
- 1995–2000: FC Zürich
- 2001–2002: FC Luzern
- 2002–2003: Carrarese
- 2004: FC Wohlen
- 2005–2007: SC Young Fellows Juventus
- 2007–2012: Chiasso
- 2012: Bellinzona
- 2012–2013: Lugano
- 2014: Sion
- 2015: FC Aarau
- * Club domestic league appearances and goals

Raimondo Ponte (born 4 April 1955) is a Swiss former professional footballer. At international level, he made 34 appearances for the Swiss national team scoring 2 goals.

== Career ==
Ponte joined Nottingham Forest from Grasshopper Club Zürich for the 1980–81 season and made 21 league appearances for Forest, before moving to play for French club SC Bastia.

He is most known for his time at Grasshoppers, having played well over 400 games for club from Zürich.

== Personal life ==
He still visits nearly every home game of Grasshoppers.
