= Swiss League Cup =

- Founded: 1972
- Abolished: 1982
- Region: Switzerland
- Teams: 16 (1972–1973); 32 (1974–1982)
- Last champions: FC Aarau (1st title)
- Most championships: Servette FC (3 titles)

The Swiss League Cup was a football tournament which took place as a summer pre-season tournament in 1972 and 1973, and during the Swiss football season from 1974–75 to 1981–82. The tournament was a knockout competition contested by clubs from the top two levels of Swiss football, the Nationalliga A and Nationalliga B.

== Finals ==
=== Single match finals ===
Edition	Winner	Score	Runner-up	Location	Date
1972	FC Basel	4–1	FC Winterthur	Letzigrund, Zürich	11 November 1972
1973	Grasshopper Club Zürich	2–2 aet (5–4 pens)	FC Winterthur	Letzigrund, Zürich	10 October 1973
1974–75	Grasshopper Club Zürich	3–0	FC Zürich	Letzigrund, Zürich	26 March 1975
1975–76	BSC Young Boys	4–2	FC Zürich	Wankdorf Stadium, Bern	23 May 1976
1976–77	Servette FC	2–0	Neuchâtel Xamax	Pontaise, Lausanne	3 May 1977
1977–78	FC St. Gallen	3–2	Grasshopper Club Zürich	Stadion Schützenwiese, Winterthur	15 August 1978
1978–79	Servette FC	2–2 aet (4–3 pens)	FC Basel	St. Jakob Stadium, Basel	5 March 1979
1979–80	Servette FC	3–0	Grasshopper Club Zürich	Gurzelen Stadion, Biel/Bienne	6 May 1980

=== Two-legged finals ===
Edition	Home team	Score	Away team	Location	Date
1980–81	FC Lausanne-Sport	1–2	FC Zürich	Pontaise, Lausanne	26 May 1981
1980–81	FC Zürich	0–0	FC Lausanne-Sport	Letzigrund, Zürich	8 September 1981
1980–81	FC Zürich won 2–1 on aggregate				
1981–82	FC St. Gallen	0–1	FC Aarau	Espenmoos, St. Gallen	18 May 1982
1981–82	FC Aarau	0–0	FC St. Gallen	Stadion Brügglifeld, Aarau	29 May 1982
1981–82	FC Aarau won 1–0 on aggregate				

=== Performance By Club ===
Club	Winners	Runners-up	Winning Years	Years runner-up
Servette FC	3	–	1977, 1979, 1980	–
Grasshopper Zürich	2	2	1973, 1975	1978, 1980
FC Zürich	1	2	1981	1975, 1976
FC Basel	1	1	1972	1979
FC St. Gallen	1	1	1978	1982
BSC Young Boys	1	–	1976	–
FC Aarau	1	–	1982	–
FC Winterthur	–	2	–	1972, 1973
Neuchâtel Xamax	–	1	–	1977
FC Lausanne-Sport	–	1	–	1981
