= 1979–80 Swiss 1. Liga =

1. Liga
- Season: 1979–80
- Champions: Group 1: FC Bulle; Group 2: FC Laufen; Group 3: FC Emmen; Group 4: Mendrisiostar
- Promoted: FC Bulle; Mendrisiostar
- Relegated: Group 1: FC Meyrin; FC Visp; Group 2: SC Düdingen; FC Lengnau; Group 3: FC Glattbrugg; FC Unterstrass; Group 4: SC Brühl; FC Zug
- Matches: 4 times 182 and 3 deciders plus 13 play-offs

The 1979–80 1. Liga was the 48th season of this league since its creation in 1931. At this time, the 1. Liga was the third tier of the Swiss football league system and it was the highest level of amateur football.

== Format ==
There were 56 clubs in the 1. Liga. These were divided into four regional groups, each with 14 teams. Within each group, the teams would play a double round-robin to decide their league position. Two points were awarded for a win. The four group winners and the four runners-up contested a first play-off round to decide the two promotion slots. The two last placed teams in each group were directly relegated to the 2. Liga (fourth tier).

== Group 1 ==
=== Teams ===
Club	Canton	Stadium	Capacity
FC Bulle	Fribourg	Stade de Bouleyres	7,000
Étoile Carouge FC	Geneva	Stade de la Fontenette	3,690
FC Fétigny	Fribourg	Stade Communal Fétigny	500
FC Leytron	Valais	Stade Saint-Martin	1,000
ES FC Malley	Vaud	Centre sportif de la Tuilière	1,500
FC Martigny-Sports	Valais	Stade d'Octodure	2,500
FC Meyrin	Geneva	Stade des Arbères	9,000
FC Monthey	Valais	Stade Philippe Pottier	1,800
FC Montreux-Sports	Vaud	Stade de Chailly	1,000
FC Orbe	Vaud	Stade du Puisoir	1,000
FC Renens	Waadt	Zone sportive du Censuy	2,300
FC Stade Lausanne	Vaud	Centre sportif de Vidy	1,000
FC Stade Nyonnais	Vaud	Stade de Colovray	7,200
FC Visp	Valais	Sportplatz Mühleye	1,000

=== Final league table ===
Pos	Team	Pld	W	D	L	GF	GA	GD	Pts	Qualification or relegation
1	FC Bulle	26	20	3	3	68	37	+31	43	Play-off to Nationalliga B
2	Etoile Carouge FC	26	17	2	7	64	29	+35	36	Play-off to Nationalliga B
3	FC Montreux-Sports	26	13	6	7	43	30	+13	32	
4	FC Martigny-Sports	26	12	6	8	49	31	+18	30	
5	FC Monthey	26	12	5	9	43	34	+9	29	
6	ES FC Malley	26	11	6	9	54	43	+11	28	
7	FC Renens	26	9	8	9	39	32	+7	26	
8	FC Stade Lausanne	26	9	8	9	48	51	−3	26	
9	FC Leytron	26	9	4	13	51	53	−2	22	
10	FC Stade Nyonnais	26	9	4	13	45	65	−20	22	
11	FC Orbe	26	6	9	11	47	56	−9	21	
12	FC Fétigny	26	8	5	13	29	45	−16	21	
13	FC Meyrin	26	6	7	13	30	55	−25	19	Relegation to 2. Liga Interregional
14	FC Visp	26	2	5	19	32	81	−49	9	Relegation to 2. Liga Interregional

Source: RSSSF
Rules for classification: 1) Points; 2) Goal difference within the league, but decider play-off for qualifiers.

== Group 2 ==
=== Teams ===
Club	Canton	Stadium	Capacity
FC Allschwil	Basel-Country	Im Brüel, Allschwil	1,700
FC Aurore Bienne	Bern	Tilleul-Linde	1,000
SC Binningen	Basel-Country	Spiegelfeld	1,800
FC Birsfelden	Basel-Country	Sternenfeld	9,400
US Boncourt	Jura	Stade Communal Léon Burrus	1,640
FC Boudry	Neuchâtel	Stade des Buchilles	1,500
FC Central Fribourg	Fribourg	Guintzet	2,000
SR Delémont	Jura	La Blancherie	5,263
SC Düdingen	Fribourg	Stadion Birchhölzli	3,000
FC Köniz	Bern	Sportplatz Liebefeld-Hessgut	2,600
FC Laufen	Basel-Country	Sportplatz Nau	3,000
FC Lengnau	Bern	Moos Lengnau BE	3,900
FC Lerchenfeld	canton of Bern	Sportanlagen Waldeck	2,400
SV Muttenz	Basel-Country	Sportplatz Margelacker	3,200

=== Final league table ===
Pos	Team	Pld	W	D	L	GF	GA	GD	Pts	Qualification or relegation
1	FC Laufen	26	15	7	4	56	18	+38	37	Play-off to Nationalliga B
2	SV Muttenz	26	18	1	7	60	31	+29	37	To decider for second place
3	FC Aurore Bienne	26	15	7	4	42	22	+20	37	To decider for second place
4	FC Köniz	26	11	7	8	54	42	+12	29	
5	SR Delémont	26	11	7	8	39	31	+8	29	
6	FC Allschwil	26	10	8	8	31	28	+3	28	
7	Central Fribourg	26	10	6	10	35	40	−5	26	
8	US Boncourt	26	9	5	12	31	36	−5	23	
9	FC Lerchenfeld	26	9	5	12	44	59	−15	23	
10	FC Boudry	26	8	6	12	35	38	−3	22	
11	SC Binningen	26	9	2	15	34	60	−26	20	
12	FC Birsfelden	26	6	7	13	25	35	−10	19	
13	SC Düdingen	26	7	4	15	33	60	−27	18	Relegation to 2. Liga Interregional
14	FC Lengnau	26	7	2	17	36	55	−19	16	Relegation to 2. Liga Interregional

Source: RSSSF
Rules for classification: 1) Points; 2) Goal difference within the league, but decider play-off for qualifiers.

=== Decider for second place ===
The decider match for second place was played on 28 May in La Blancherie in Delémont

Team 1	Score	Team 2
SV Muttenz	0–0 a.e.t. 4–2 pen.	FC Aurore Bienne

SV Muttenz win after the penalty shoot-out and advance to play-offs. FC Aurore Bienne remain in the division.

== Group 3 ==
=== Teams ===
Club	Canton	Stadium	Capacity
FC Blue Stars Zürich	Zürich	Hardhof	1,000
SC Derendingen	Solothurn	Heidenegg	1,500
SC Emmen	Lucerne	Sportanlage Feldbreite	500
FC Emmenbrücke	Lucerne	Stadion Gersag	8,700
FC Oberentfelden	Aargau	Schützenrain	1,500
FC Glattbrugg	Zürich	Sportanlage Au	1,250
FC Herzogenbuchsee	Bern	Waldäcker	1,000
FC Schaffhausen	Schaffhausen	Stadion Breite	7,300
FC Solothurn	Solothurn	Stadion FC Solothurn	6,750
FC Suhr	Aargau	Hofstattmatten	2,000
FC Sursee	Lucerne	Stadion Schlottermilch	3,500
FC Turicum	Zürich	Hardhof	1,000
FC Unterstrass	Zürich	Steinkluppe	1,000
FC Young Fellows Zürich	Zürich	Utogrund	2,850

=== Final league table ===
Pos	Team	Pld	W	D	L	GF	GA	GD	Pts	Qualification or relegation
1	FC Emmen	26	17	5	4	74	35	+39	39	Play-off to Nationalliga B
2	FC Emmenbrücke	26	17	3	6	65	38	+27	37	Play-off to Nationalliga B
3	FC Sursee	26	10	13	3	57	37	+20	33	
4	SC Derendingen	26	12	8	6	45	37	+8	32	
5	FC Suhr	26	13	4	9	50	39	+11	30	
6	FC Blue Stars Zürich	26	12	4	10	45	41	+4	28	
7	FC Solothurn	26	9	6	11	34	33	+1	24	
8	SC Young Fellows	26	8	8	10	39	41	−2	24	
9	FC Turicum	26	7	10	9	39	49	−10	24	
10	FC Schaffhausen	26	9	5	12	39	48	−9	23	
11	FC Oberentfelden	26	8	6	12	42	58	−16	22	
12	FC Glattbrugg	26	6	6	14	38	56	−18	18	Decider for twelfth place
13	FC Herzogenbuchsee	26	6	6	14	30	54	−24	18	Decider for twelfth place
14	FC Unterstrass	26	4	4	18	25	56	−31	12	Relegation to 2. Liga Interregional

Source: RSSSF
Rules for classification: 1) Points; 2) Goal difference within the league, but decider play-off for qualifiers.

=== Decider for twelfth place ===
The decider was played on 1 June in Baden.

Team 1	Score	Team 2
FC Herzogenbuchsee	5–1	FC Glattbrugg

FC Herzogenbuchsee win and remain in the division. FC Glattbrugg are relegated to 2. Liga Interregional.

== Group 4 ==
=== Teams ===
Club	Canton	Stadium	Capacity
FC Altstätten (St. Gallen)	St. Gallen	Grüntal Altstätten	1,000
FC Balzers	Liechtenstein	Sportplatz Rheinau	2,000
SC Brühl	St. Gallen	Paul-Grüninger-Stadion	4,200
FC Gossau	St. Gallen	Sportanlage Buechenwald	3,500
FC Ibach	Schwyz	Gerbihof	3,300
FC Locarno	Locarno, Ticino	Stadio comunale Lido	5,000
Mendrisiostar	Ticino	Centro Sportivo Comunale	4,000
FC Morbio	Ticino	Campo comunale Balerna	800
FC Rüti	Zürich	Schützenwiese	1,200
FC Stäfa	Zürich	Sportanlage Frohberg	1,500
FC Uzwil	St. Gallen	Rüti	1,000
FC Vaduz	Liechtenstein	Rheinpark Stadion	7,584
SC Zug	Zug	Herti Allmend Stadion	6,000
FC Zug	Zug	Herti Allmend Stadion	6,000

=== Final league table ===
Pos	Team	Pld	W	D	L	GF	GA	GD	Pts	Qualification or relegation
1	Mendrisiostar	26	17	6	3	47	17	+30	40	Play-off to Nationalliga B
2	FC Altstätten (St. Gallen)	26	13	11	2	58	34	+24	37	Play-off to Nationalliga B
3	FC Ibach	26	13	8	5	58	31	+27	34	
4	FC Locarno	26	11	8	7	37	29	+8	30	
5	FC Vaduz	26	10	9	7	55	38	+17	29	
6	FC Rüti	26	11	6	9	36	35	+1	28	
7	FC Stäfa	26	11	4	11	35	39	−4	26	
8	FC Balzers	26	9	5	12	49	55	−6	23	
9	FC Uzwil	26	7	9	10	44	57	−13	23	
10	FC Morbio	26	7	7	12	37	48	−11	21	
11	FC Gossau	26	6	8	12	35	50	−15	20	
12	SC Brühl	26	4	11	11	26	43	−17	19	Decider for twelfth place
13	SC Zug	26	6	7	13	31	49	−18	19	Decider for twelfth place
14	FC Zug	26	2	11	13	17	40	−23	15	Relegation to 2. Liga Interregional

Source: RSSSF
Rules for classification: 1) Points; 2) Goal difference within the league, but decider play-off for qualifiers.

=== Decider for twelfth place ===
The decider was played on 1 June in Zürich.

Team 1	Score	Team 2
SC Zug	4–3 a.e.t.	SC Brühl

SC Zug win and remain in division. SC Brühl are relegated to 2. Liga Interregional.

== Promotion play-off ==
=== Qualification round ===
Team 1	Score	Team 2
FC Bulle	2–2	FC Altstätten (SG)
FC Altstätten (SG)	1–3	FC Bulle

FC Bulle win 5–3 on aggregate and continue to the finals.

Team 1	Score	Team 2
Etoile Carouge FC	0–4	Mendrisiostar
Mendrisiostar	1–0	Etoile Carouge FC

Mendrisiostar win 5–0 on aggregate and continue to the finals.

Team 1	Score	Team 2
SV Muttenz	0–0	FC Emmen
FC Emmen	3–2	SV Muttenz

FC Emmen win 3–2 on aggregate and continue to the finals.

Team 1	Score	Team 2
FC Emmenbrücke	0–1	FC Laufen
FC Laufen	4–1	FC Emmenbrücke

FC Laufen win 5–1 on aggregate and continue to the finals.

=== Final round ===
Team 1	Score	Team 2
FC Bulle	3–0	FC Emmen
FC Emmen	0–0	FC Bulle

FC Bulle win 3–0 on aggregate and are promoted to 1980–81 Nationalliga B. FC Emmen remain in the division.

Team 1	Score	Team 2
FC Laufen	A–A	Mendrisiostar
Mendrisiostar	1–2	FC Laufen
FC Laufen	0–3	Mendrisiostar

1st match abandoned after 6' due to rainfall: replay June 29 in Laufen. Mendrisiostar win 4–2 on aggregate and are promoted to 1980–81 Nationalliga B. FC Laufen remain in the division.

== Further in Swiss football ==
- 1979–80 Nationalliga A
- 1979–80 Nationalliga B
- 1979–80 Swiss Cup

== Sources ==
- Switzerland 1979–80 at RSSSF

Preceded by 1978–79	Seasons in Swiss 1. Liga	Succeeded by 1980–81
