= 1980–81 Nationalliga A =

Swiss football season

Nationalliga A
- Season: 1980–81
- Champions: Zürich
- Relegated: Chênois
- European Cup: Zürich
- Cup Winners' Cup: Lausanne-Sport
- UEFA Cup: Grasshopper Club; Xamax
- Top goalscorer: Peter Risi (Luzern) 18 goals

Nationalliga B
- Season: 1980–81
- Champions: Vevey-Sports
- Promoted: Vevey-Sports; FC Aarau; FC Bulle
- Relegated: SC Kriens
- Top goalscorer: Roland Blanchard (Bulle); Patrick Gavillet (Vevey) both 20 goals

The following is the summary of the Swiss National League in the 1980–81 football season, both Nationalliga A and Nationalliga B. This was the 85th season of top-tier and the 84th season of second-tier football in Switzerland.

== Overview ==
The Swiss Football League had 28 members at this time. The clubs were divided into two tiers of 14 teams each. The top tier was named Nationalliga A (NLA) and the second tier was named Nationalliga B (NLB). The format in both divisions was that the teams played a double round-robin to decide their table positions. Each club playing every other club twice (home and away) for a total of 26 rounds. Two points were awarded for a win and one point was awarded for a draw. The Swiss champions would qualify for the 1981–82 European Cup, the runners-up and third placed team would qualify for the 1981–82 UEFA Cup.

There was to be an expansion from 28 to 32 members of the ASF/SFV at the end of this season, with new 16 teams in each division. Therefore, this season would only see one club from the NLA relegated to the second-tier. The top three placed teams in the NLB would be promoted to the top tier. Only one team from the NLB was relegated to next season's 1. Liga. Five teams from this season's 1. Liga would be promoted to make up the numbers.

== Nationalliga A ==
The first round of the NLA was played on 23 August 1980. There was a winter break between 6 December and 28 February 1981. The season was completed on 13 June 1981.

=== Teams, locations ===
Team	Town	Canton	Stadium	Capacity
FC Basel	Basel	Basel-Stadt	St. Jakob Stadium	36,800
AC Bellinzona	Bellinzona	Ticino	Stadio Comunale Bellinzona	5,000
CS Chênois	Thônex	Geneva	Stade des Trois-Chêne	8,000
FC Chiasso	Chiasso	Ticino	Stadio Comunale Riva IV	4,000
Grasshopper Club	Zürich	Zürich	Hardturm	20,000
Lausanne-Sports	Lausanne	Vaud	Pontaise	15,700
FC Luzern	Lucerne	Lucerne	Stadion Allmend	25,000
Neuchâtel Xamax	Neuchâtel	Neuchâtel	Stade de la Maladière	25,500
Nordstern Basel	Basel	Basel-Stadt	Rankhof	7,600
FC St. Gallen	St. Gallen	St. Gallen	Espenmoos	11,000
Servette	Geneva	Geneva	Stade des Charmilles	27,000
FC Sion	Sion	Valais	Stade de Tourbillon	16,000
Young Boys	Bern	Bern	Wankdorf Stadium	56,000
FC Zürich	Zürich	Zürich	Letzigrund	25,000

=== Final league table ===
Pos	Team	Pld	W	D	L	GF	GA	GD	Pts	Qualification
1	Zürich	26	18	4	4	57	28	+29	40	Champions, qualified for 1981–82 European Cup and entered 1981 Intertoto Cup
2	Grasshopper Club	26	11	12	3	45	24	+21	34	qualified for 1981–82 UEFA Cup and entered 1981 Intertoto Cup
3	Xamax	26	14	6	6	44	25	+19	34	qualified for 1981–82 UEFA Cup
4	Young Boys	26	11	11	4	46	33	+13	33	entered 1981 Intertoto Cup
5	Lausanne-Sport	26	12	6	8	40	29	+11	30	Swiss Cup winners, qualified for 1981–82 Cup Winners' Cup
6	Basel	26	9	10	7	48	44	+4	28	
7	Servette	26	8	10	8	38	36	+2	26	
8	Sion	26	8	8	10	35	42	−7	24	
9	Luzern	26	6	10	10	39	46	−7	22	entered 1981 Intertoto Cup
10	St. Gallen	26	7	8	11	35	42	−7	22	
11	Nordstern Basel	26	6	7	13	28	37	−9	19	
12	Bellinzona	26	7	5	14	25	46	−21	19	
13	Chiasso	26	5	8	13	28	46	−18	18	
14	Chênois	26	3	9	14	23	53	−30	15	Relegated to 1981–82 Nationalliga B

Source: rsssf.com
Rules for classification: 1) points; 2) goal difference; 3) number of goals scored.

=== Results ===
Home \ Away	BAS	BEL	CHÊ	CHI	GCZ	LS	LUZ	NX	NOR	SER	SIO	STG	YB	ZÜR
Basel		4–0	0–0	3–0	1–5	3–2	4–4	1–2	1–1	2–2	4–1	1–0	2–2	2–0
Bellinzona	1–1		3–1	2–0	0–2	1–2	0–0	1–0	0–2	0–0	0–0	2–0	0–3	4–1
Chênois	2–2	2–1		1–1	1–3	1–4	0–0	0–4	0–1	2–2	0–0	2–0	1–2	1–3
Chiasso	3–0	5–1	0–0		0–0	0–2	1–1	1–1	4–3	1–1	2–4	1–2	1–1	0–1
Grasshopper	2–2	3–0	2–1	2–1		0–0	3–1	1–1	0–1	2–1	3–0	1–1	2–2	1–1
Lausanne-Sports	2–2	3–0	4–1	0–1	0–2		2–1	4–1	2–0	2–0	0–1	0–0	0–1	2–2
Luzern	3–1	3–2	2–1	1–2	2–2	2–1		1–2	0–2	1–1	2–2	0–2	1–1	1–1
Neuchâtel Xamax	3–2	3–0	4–0	2–0	0–0	4–0	3–0		1–1	1–1	2–1	3–2	1–0	0–2
Nordstern Basel	1–2	1–2	1–2	1–0	0–3	1–2	1–3	0–0		1–1	4–0	0–0	1–1	1–2
Servette	2–1	0–1	3–1	4–2	2–1	0–0	2–2	0–2	1–0		3–0	2–1	1–4	1–2
Sion	1–1	3–1	2–2	5–0	2–2	0–0	1–2	1–0	2–1	0–3		4–1	2–1	1–3
St. Gallen	1–2	2–2	2–0	1–1	2–2	1–2	5–4	1–2	1–0	1–1	2–1		2–2	3–1
Young Boys	3–1	2–0	1–1	3–0	1–1	2–4	3–2	3–1	2–2	3–2	0–0	3–1		0–0
Zürich	1–3	3–1	6–0	4–1	1–0	2–0	1–0	2–1	5–1	3–2	3–1	3–1	4–0	

Source: rsssf.com
Legend: Blue = home team win; Yellow = draw; Red = away team win.

== Attendances ==
#	Club	Average attendance	Highest attendance
1	Young Boys	10,838	25,000
2	Luzern	8,146	12,000
3	Zürich	7,292	14,000
4	Basel	6,631	17,500
5	St. Gallen	6,238	11,000
6	GCZ	5,444	17,000
7	Xamax	5,185	10,200
8	Lausanne	4,000	8,500
9	Sion	3,954	10,300
10	Servette	3,738	5,500
11	Bellinzona	3,492	7,000
12	Nordstern Basel	2,654	6,500
13	Chiasso	2,415	9,200
14	Chênois	2,115	5,500

== Nationalliga B ==
The first round of the NLB was played on 23 August 1980. There was a winter break between 6 December and 28 February 1981. The season was completed on 13 June 1981.

=== Teams, locations ===
Team	Town	Canton	Stadium	Capacity
FC Aarau	Aarau	Aargau	Stadion Brügglifeld	9,240
FC Bern	Bern	Bern	Stadion Neufeld	14,000
FC Biel-Bienne	Biel/Bienne	Bern	Stadion Gurzelen	15,000
FC Bulle	Bulle	Fribourg	Stade de Bouleyres	7,000
FC Frauenfeld	Frauenfeld	Thurgau	Kleine Allmend	6,370
FC Fribourg	Fribourg	Fribourg	Stade Universitaire	9,000
FC Grenchen	Grenchen	Solothurn	Stadium Brühl	15,100
SC Kriens	Kriens	Lucerne	Stadion Kleinfeld	5,100
FC La Chaux-de-Fonds	La Chaux-de-Fonds	Neuchâtel	Centre Sportif de la Charrière	12,700
FC Lugano	Lugano	Ticino	Cornaredo Stadium	6,330
Mendrisiostar	Mendrisio	Ticino	Centro Sportivo Comunale	4,000
Vevey Sports	Vevey	Vaud	Stade de Copet	4,000
FC Wettingen	Wettingen	Aargau	Stadion Altenburg	10,000
FC Winterthur	Winterthur	Zürich	Schützenwiese	8,550

=== Final league table ===
Pos	Team	Pld	W	D	L	GF	GA	GD	Pts	Qualification or relegation
1	Vevey-Sports	26	14	8	4	59	29	+30	50	NLB Champions promoted to 1981–82 Nationalliga A
2	FC Aarau	26	14	7	5	55	37	+18	49	Promoted to 1981–82 Nationalliga A
3	FC Bulle	26	13	8	5	45	30	+15	47	Promoted to 1981–82 Nationalliga A
4	FC Wettingen	26	11	11	4	45	25	+20	44	
5	FC Frauenfeld	26	11	9	6	47	29	+18	42	
6	FC Bern	26	8	10	8	43	40	+3	34	
7	FC Fribourg	26	7	11	8	24	33	−9	32	
8	FC Winterthur	26	9	6	11	40	47	−7	33	
9	FC Grenchen	26	10	3	13	32	42	−10	33	
10	Lugano	26	6	10	10	42	56	−14	28	
11	FC Biel-Bienne	26	8	5	13	41	52	−11	29	
12	FC La Chaux-de-Fonds	26	6	7	13	24	37	−13	25	
13	Mendrisiostar	26	6	6	14	23	35	−12	24	
14	SC Kriens	26	4	9	13	31	59	−28	21	Relegated to 1981–82 1. Liga

Source: rsssf.com
Rules for classification: 1) points; 2) goal difference; 3) number of goals scored.

== Further in Swiss football ==
- 1980–81 Swiss Cup
- 1980–81 Swiss 1. Liga

== Sources ==
- Switzerland 1980–81 at RSSSF

Preceded by 1979–80	Nationalliga seasons in Switzerland	Succeeded by 1981–82
