= 1982–83 Swiss Cup =

Tournament details
- Country: Switzerland

Final positions
- Champions: Grasshopper Club
- Runners-up: Servette

The 1982–83 Swiss Cup was the 58th season of Switzerland's annual football cup competition.

== Overview ==
The competition began on 7 and 8 August 1982 with the first games of the first round and was completed on Whit Monday 23 May 1983 with the final, which was held at the former Wankdorf Stadium in Bern. The teams from the Nationalliga B were granted byes for the first round. The games of the second round were played on the weekend 14 and 15 of August. The teams from the Nationalliga A were granted byes for the first two rounds. The matches were played in a knockout format. Up until the fifth round, in the event of a draw at the end of extra time, the match was decided with a penalty shoot-out. In and after the fifth round replays were foreseen and this was played on the visiting team's pitch. The winners of the cup qualified themselves for the first round of the Cup Winners' Cup in the next season.

== Round 3 ==
=== Summary ===
The teams from the NLA joined the cup competition in the third round. Whenever possible, the draw was respecting regionalities and the lower-tier team was granted home advantage.

Team 1	Score	Team 2
16 October 1982
FC Leytron	0–2	Servette
Colombier	1–0	Bulle
Signal FC (Bernex)	2–6	Chênois
La Chaux-de-Fonds	1–1 (a.e.t.) (4–3 p)	Sion
Biel-Bienne	3–1	Etoile Carouge
FC Bassecourt	3–6	Lausanne-Sport
Martigny-Sports	2–5 (a.e.t.)	Vevey Sports
FC Boudry	5–0	FC Superga La Chaux-de-Fonds
Emmenbrücke	0–4	Wettingen
FC Küsnacht	1–3	Grasshopper Club
Locarno	2–2 (a.e.t.) (2–4 p)	FC Brüttisellen
FC Stäfa	0–2	Zürich
17 October 1982
Yverdon-Sport	0–6	Neuchâtel Xamax
FC Raron	1–2	FC Orbe
Fribourg	4–1	Köniz
FC Breitenbach	0–4	Basel
FC Allmendingen	0–3	Kriens
Ibach	1–2 (a.e.t.)	Luzern
Burgdorf	1–3	SC Zug
Nordstern	0–1 (a.e.t.)	Young Boys
FC Littau	1–4	Aarau
SC Derendingen	0–1	Bern
FC Langenthal	3–4 (a.e.t.)	Laufen
FC Zug	1–0	FC Sursee
Lugano	2–0	Gossau
FC Einsielden	3–4	Winterthur
Red Star	1–2	Mendrisio
Baden	2–4	Bellinzona
Chiasso	5–1	FC Unterstrass
Vaduz	2–1	FC Morbio
FC Rüti ZH	0–3	St. Gallen
FC Schötz	3–5	FC Cortaillod

=== Matches ===
16 October 1982

FC Leytron	0–2	Servette
	Servette summary	(0:1) Schnyder (o.g.)

Stade Saint-Martin, Leytron
Referee: (Switzerland)

16 October 1982

FC Stäfa	0–2	Zürich
	FCZ summary	11' (0:1) Maissen; (yellow card) 21' Maissen; 69' (0:2) Elsener

Sportanlage Frohberg, FC Stäfa
Attendance: 3,300 (sold out)
Referee: (Switzerland) Arturo Martino (Neukirch an der Thur)

17 October 1982
14:30

FC Breitenbach	0 – 4	Basel
R. Hänggi (yellow card)	FCB summary	13' (0:1) Berkemeier; 26' (0:2) Zbinden; 71' (0:3) Sutter; 87' (0:2) Berkemeier; (yellow card) Maradan; (yellow card) Graf

Bodenacker, Breitenbach
Attendance: 2,800
Referee: (Switzerland) Rolf Blattmann (Zeiningen)

17 October 1982

Nordstern	0–1 (a.e.t.)	Young Boys
	YB summary	(red card) 73' Arm; 117' Peterhans

Rankhof, Basel
Attendance: 1,200
Referee: (Switzerland) Daniel Bürki

17 October 1982

FC Littau	1–4 (a.e.t.)	Aarau
Edgar Fuchs 64' (1:4)	FCA summary	2' (0:1) Moritz; 30' (0:2) Hegi; 41' (0:3) Alfred Herberth; 59' (0:4) Müller

Ruopigen, Littau
Attendance: 1,500
Referee: (Switzerland) Bernard Neukom (Zürich)

== Round 4 ==
=== Summary ===
Team 1	Score	Team 2
12 March 1983
Colombier	1–3	FC Boudry
13 March 1983
Basel	2–1 (a.e.t.)	Lausanne-Sport
Fribourg	1–4	Servette
Young Boys	3–0	Vevey Sports
FC Cortaillod	1–2	Neuchâtel Xamax
Aarau	2–4	Chênois
Biel-Bienne	0–2	Bern
La Chaux-de-Fonds	8–0	FC Orbe
Chênois	1–2	Winterthur
Kriens	0–0 (a.e.t.) (3–4 p)	Mendrisio
Bellinzona	0–1	Luzern
SC Zug	0–4	Zürich
Grasshopper Club	3–0	Laufen
Lugano	0–0 (a.e.t.) (4–5 p)	St. Gallen
Vaduz	3–2 (a.e.t.)	FC Zug
FC Brüttisellen	0–1	Wettingen

=== Matches ===
13 March 1983
14:30

Basel	2 – 1 (a.e.t.)	Lausanne-Sport
Berkemeier (yellow card) 25'; Sutter 81' (1:1); Stohler 117' (2:1)	FCB summary	(penalty missed) 42′ Pellegrini; (yellow card) 49' Lei-Ravello; 63' (0:1) Ryf

St. Jakob Stadium, Basel
Attendance: 7,300
Referee: (Switzerland) Jakob Baumann (Schaffhausen)

13 March 1983
14:30

Fribourg	1–4	Servette
Goal	Sevette summary	Elia; Schnyder; Brigger; Brigger

Stade Universitaire, Fribourg
Referee: (Switzerland)

13 March 1983
14:30

Young Boys	3–0	Vevey Sports
Baur 17' (1:0); Schönenberger 29' (2:0); Peterhans 70' (3:0)	YB summary

Wankdorf Stadium, Bern
Attendance: 4,100
Referee: (Switzerland) Kurt Röthlisberger (Suhr)

13 March 1983
14:30

Aarau	2–4	Chênois
Moritz 23' (1:0); Alfred Herberth 80' (2:3)	FCA summary	25' (1:1) Coste; 33' (1:2) Coste; 50' (1:3) Castella; 90' (2:4) Barras

Stadion Brügglifeld, Aarau
Attendance: 2,385
Referee: (Switzerland) Willy Hänni

13 March 1983
14:30

SC Zug	0–4	Zürich
	FCZ summary	15' (0:1) Zwicker; 25' (0:2) Zwicker; 29' (0:3) Häusermann; 47' (0:4) Rufer

Allmend Stadion, Zug
Attendance: 3,500
Referee: (Switzerland) Marco Raveglia (San Vittore)

== Round 5 ==
=== Summary ===
Team 1	Score	Team 2
2 April 1983
Wettingen	2–2 (a.e.t.)	St. Gallen
4 April 1983
Neuchâtel Xamax	1–1 (a.e.t.)	Grasshopper Club
Chênois	1–5	Winterthur
Bern	0–3	Servette
La Chaux-de-Fonds	P–P	Young Boys
Mendrisio	2–1	Basel
Luzern	4–1	Vaduz
Zürich	8–0	FC Boudry

Due to the unplayable terrain in La Chaux de Fonds, the game was moved to Bern on the next day.

Replays

Team 1	Score	Team 2
5 April 1983
St. Gallen	1–1 (a.e.t.) (4–1 p)	Wettingen
Young Boys	2–0	La Chaux-de-Fonds
19 April 1983
Grasshopper Club	0–0 (a.e.t.) (4–2 p)	Neuchâtel Xamax

=== Matches ===
4 April 1983
14:30

Bern	0–3	Servette
	Servette summary	(0:1) Favre (o.g.) (0:3) Elia

Stadion Neufeld, Bern

4 April 1983
14:30

Mendrisio	2 – 1	Basel
Mohorovic 10' (1:0); Ambroggi (yellow card) 34'; Mohorovic 74' (2:1); Vavassori (yellow card) 76'	FCB summary	21' (1:1) Stohler; (yellow card) 75' Maradan

Centro Sportivo Comunale, Mendrisio
Attendance: 3,000
Referee: (Switzerland) Peter Hauser

4 April 1983
14:30

Zürich	8–0	FC Boudry
Landolt 16' (1:0); Jerković 17' (2:0); Jerković 27' (3:0); Seiler 50' (4:0); Zwicker 56' (5:0); Landolt 64' (6:0); Zwicker 82' (7:0); Elsener 84' (8:0)	FCZ summary

Letzigrund, Zürich
Attendance: 1,968
Referee: (Switzerland) Arturo Martino (Neukirch an der Thur)

5 April 1983
14:30

Young Boys	2–0	La Chaux-de-Fonds
Peterhans 12' (1:0); Zahnd 20' (2:0)	YB summary

Wankdorf Stadium, Bern
Attendance: 4,800
Referee: (Switzerland) Bruno Galler (Kirchdorf, Bern)

== Quarter-finals ==
=== Summary ===
Team 1	Score	Team 2
26 April 1983
Zürich	3–1	Winterthur
Servette	4–1	Mendrisio
St. Gallen	0–1	Grasshopper Club
Luzern	2–2 (a.e.t.)	Young Boys

Replay

Team 1	Score	Team 2
Young Boys	1–0	Luzern

=== Matches ===
26 April 1983
14:30

Zürich	3–1	Winterthur
Rufer 82' (1:1); Elsener (84), 2:1'; Jerković 89' (3:1)	FCZ summary	57' (0:1) Venica

Letzigrund, Zürich
Attendance: 1,636
Referee: (Switzerland) Charles-Henri Morex

26 April 1983
14:30

Servette	4–1	Mendrisio
Seramondi; Schnyder; Elia; Cacciapaglia	Servette summary	Goal

Stade des Charmilles, Geneva

26 April 1983
14:30

Luzern	2–2 (a.e.t.)	Young Boys
Hemmeter 49' (1:1); Martinelli 63' (2:2)	YB summary	22' (0:1) Baur; 57' (2:1)

Stadion Allmend, Lucerne
Attendance: 12,400
Referee: (Switzerland) Arturo Martino (Neukirch an der Thur)

28 April 1983
14:30

Young Boys	1–0	Luzern
Weber	YB summary

Wankdorf Stadium, Bern
Attendance: 8,900
Referee: (Switzerland) Willi Jaus (Feldmeilen)

== Semi-finals ==
=== Summary ===
Team 1	Score	Team 2
3 May 1983
Grasshopper Club	5–1	Zürich
Young Boys	0–1	Servette

=== Matches ===
3 May 1983

Grasshopper Club	5–1	Zürich
Sulser 26' (1:0); In-Albon 32' (2:0); Egli 55' (pen.); Marchand 60' (4:1); Marchand 80' (5:1)	FCZ summary	39' (2:1) Elsener

Hardturm, Zürich
Attendance: 12,000
Referee: (Switzerland) Georges Sandoz (Corcelles-Cormondrèche, Neuchâtel)

3 May 1983

Young Boys	0–1	Servette
	YB summary Servette summary	57' (0:1) Yagcha Mustapha

Wankdorf Stadium, Bern
Attendance: 16,000
Referee: (Switzerland) Bruno Galler (Kirchdorf, Bern)

== Final ==
The final was held at the former Wankdorf Stadium in Bern on Whit Monday 1983.

=== Summary ===
Team 1	Score	Team 2
23 May 1983
Grasshopper Club	2–2 (a.e.t.)	Servette

Replay

Team 1	Score	Team 2
14 June 1983
Grasshopper Club	3–0	Servette

=== Telegram ===
23 May 1983
15:30

Grasshopper Club	2–2 (a.e.t.)	Servette
Seramondi 47' (1:0); Egli 117' (2:2)	Fussball-Schweiz summary	50' (o.g.) Seramondi; 105' (1:2) Brigger

Wankdorf Stadium, Bern
Attendance: 28,650
Referee: (Switzerland) André Daina (Éclépens)

The replay was also held at the Wankdorf Stadium and was played on 14 June 1983.

14 June 1983
15:30

Grasshopper Club	3–0	Servette
Egli 16' (1:0); Sulser 33' (2:0); Sulser 72' (3:0)	Fussball-Schweiz summary

Wankdorf Stadium, Bern
Attendance: 26,000
Referee: (Switzerland) Renzo Peduzzi (Roveredo)

Grasshopper Club won the cup and this was the club's fourteenth cup title to this date. Because they won the Swiss championship as well, they won the domestic double and this for the seventh time in their history.

== Further in Swiss football ==
- 1982–83 Nationalliga A
- 1982–83 Swiss 1. Liga

== Sources ==
- Fussball-Schweiz
- 1982–83 at fcb-achiv.ch
- Switzerland 1982–83 at RSSSF

Preceded by 1981–82	Swiss Cup seasons	Succeeded by 1983–84
