= 1981–82 Swiss Cup =

Tournament details
- Country: Switzerland

Final positions
- Champions: Sion
- Runners-up: Basel

The 1981–82 Swiss Cup was the 57th season of Switzerland's annual football cup competition.

== Overview ==
The competition began on 1 and 2 August 1982 with the first games of the first round and was completed on Whit Monday 31 May 1982 with the final, which was held at the former Wankdorf Stadium in Bern. The teams from the Nationalliga B were granted byes for the first round. The games of the second round were played one week later, on the weekend 8 and 9 of August. The teams from the Nationalliga A were granted byes for the first two rounds. The matches were played in a knockout format. Up until the fifth round, in the event of a draw at the end of extra time, the match was decided with a penalty shoot-out. In and after the fifth round replays were foreseen and this was played on the visiting team's pitch. The winners of the cup qualified themselves for the first round of the Cup Winners' Cup in the next season.

== Round 3 ==
=== Summary ===
The teams from the NLA joined the cup competition in the third round. Whenever possible, the draw was respecting regionalities and the lower-tier team was granted home advantage.

Team 1	Score	Team 2
26 September 1981
FC Boudry	1–2	FC Aurore Bienne
Chênois	5–0	FC Siviriez
Stade Nyonnais	0–3	Servette
FC Sursee	1–9	Basel
Bern	2–1	Grenchen
SC Zug	2–6 (a.e.t.)	Nordstern
Wettingen	5–5 (a.e.t.) (5–4 p)	Ibach
Biel-Bienne	2–3	Neuchâtel Xamax
FC Dietikon	0–5	St. Gallen
Locarno	3–1 (a.e.t.)	Lugano
ES Malley	1–7	Lausanne-Sport
FC Einsielden	0–9	Bellinzona
Young Fellows	0–8	Grasshopper Club
FC Glarus	0–5	Zürich
SC Balerna	0–4	Winterthur
27 September 1981
Balzers	1–1 (a.e.t.) (2–4 p)	Mendrisio
FC Altdorf (Uri)	4–3	FC Bremgarten
La Chaux-de-Fonds	3–1	FC Onex
Gland	1–4	Bulle
FC Leytron	3–1	Yverdon-Sport
Thun	0–3	Young Boys
FC Estavayer-le-Lac	0–3	Vevey Sports
CS La Tour-de-Peilz	1–1 (a.e.t.) (4–3 p)	Meyrin
Delémont	4–1	Buochs
FC Muri	1–4	Aarau
FC Embrach	1–2	FC Amriswil
Monthey	0–1	Sion
Solothurn	3–2	FC Langenthal
FC Töss	2–3	Chiasso
Schaffhausen	4–1	FC Turicum
FC Breitenbach	0–1	Baden
Burgdorf	0–1	Luzern

=== Matches ===
26 September 1981

Stade Nyonnais	0–3	Servette
	Servette summary	(0:1) Yagcha Mustapha (0:2) Pleimelding (0:3) Elia

Stade de Colovray, Nyon

26 September 1981

FC Sursee	1–9	Basel
Hummel 53' (pen. 1:5)	FCB summary	20' (0:1) Demarmels; 23' (0:2) Duvernois; 26' (0:3) Sutter; 32' (0:4) Nickel; 48' (0:5) Maissen; 79' (1:6) Gaisser; 82' (1:7) Jeitziner; 83' (1:8) Maissen; 90' (1:9) Geisser

Stadion Schlottermilch, Sursee
Attendance: 3,100
Referee: (Switzerland) Willi Jaus (Feldmeilen)

26 September 1981

FC Glarus	0–5	Zürich
Huttary (head coach) (yellow card) 15'	FCZ summary	37' (0:1) Lüdi; 62' (0:2) Zwicker; 67' (0:3) Lüdi; 70' (0:4) Elsener; 75' (0:5) Jeandupeux

Buchholz, Glarus
Attendance: 3,000
Referee: (Switzerland) Jakob Baumann (Schaffhausen)

27 September 1981

Thun	0–3	Young Boys
	YB summary	13' (0:1) Müller; 26' (0:2) Zahnd; 62' (0:3) Müller; (penalty missed) 80′ Conz

Stadion Lachen, Thun
Attendance: 4,500
Referee: (Switzerland) Jean-Daniel Pralong

27 September 1981

FC Muri	1–4	Aarau
Feussel 80' (1:3)	FCA summary	31' (0:1) Tschuppert; 36' (0:2) Herberth; 45' (0:3) Kaltaveridis; 90' (1:4) Herberth

Stadion Brühl, Muri
Attendance: 1,800
Referee: (Switzerland) Bruno Burgener

== Round 4 ==
=== Summary ===
Team 1	Score	Team 2
30 October 1981
Neuchâtel Xamax	8–1	FC Aurore Bienne
31 October 1981
Bellinzona	0–1	Basel
FC Altdorf (Uri)	0–8	Grasshopper Club
La Chaux-de-Fonds	1–2	Lausanne-Sport
Bulle	3–1	FC Leytron
Young Boys	2–2 (a.e.t.) (5–4 p)	Vevey Sports
1 November 1981
Wettingen	4–0 (a.e.t.)	Mendrisio
CS La Tour-de-Peilz	1–2	Delémont
Aarau	5–0	Bern
FC Amriswil	2–3	Nordstern
Sion	3–2 (a.e.t.)	Servette
Solothurn	1–5	Chênois
Locarno	3–1	St. Gallen
Winterthur	4–3	Chiasso
Schaffhausen	1–1 (a.e.t.) (2–4 p)	Baden
Luzern	6–1	Zürich

=== Matches ===
31 October 1981
14:45

Bellinzona	0–1	Basel
	Summary	26' (0:1) Maissen

Stadio Comunale Bellinzona
Attendance: 2,400
Referee: (Switzerland) Othmar Winter

31 October 1981
14:30

Young Boys	2–2 (a.e.t.)	Vevey Sports
Müller 84' (1:2); Müller 90+2' (2:2)	YB summary	38' (0:1) Henry; 81' (0:2) Matthey
Penalties
Conz (penalty scored); Schönenberger (penalty scored); Zahnd (penalty scored); Arm (penalty scored); Müller (penalty missed); Brechbühl (penalty scored)	5–4	(penalty scored) Debonnaire; (penalty missed) Henry; (penalty scored) Küng; (penalty scored) Matthey; (penalty scored) Franz; (penalty missed) Marchi

Wankdorf Stadium, Bern
Attendance: 2,500
Referee: (Switzerland) Walter Nussbaumer

1 November 1981
14:30

Aarau	5–0	Bern
Marti 20' (1:0); Herberth 31' (2:0); Siegrist 46' (3:0); Tschuppert 70' (4:0); Gloor 76' (5:0)	FCA summary

Stadion Brügglifeld, Aarau
Attendance: 2,950
Referee: (Switzerland) Rudolf Renggli (Luzern)

1 November 1981
14:30

Sion	3–2 (a.e.t.)	Servette
Goal	Servette summary	Elia; Radi

Tourbillon, Sion

1 November 1981
14:30

Luzern	6–1	Zürich
Kaufmann 27' (1:0); Risi 41' (2:1); Lauscher 43' (3:1); Risi 45' (pen.); Risi 81' (5:1); Hitzfeld 86' (pen.)	FCZ summary	31' (1:1) Seiler

Stadion Allmend, Luzern
Attendance: 10,100
Referee: (Switzerland) Arturo Martino (Neukirch an der Thur)

== Round 5 ==
=== Summary ===
Team 1	Score	Team 2
20 March 1983
Wettingen	2–1 (a.e.t.)	Locarno
Neuchâtel Xamax	1–0	Nordstern
Grasshopper Club	1–0	Bulle
Lausanne-Sport	3–2	Luzern
Delémont	1–0	Baden
Aarau	2–3	Basel
Sion	3–1	Winterthur
23 March 1983
Young Boys	1–0	Chênois

=== Matches ===
21 March 1983
15:00

Aarau	2 – 3	Basel
Herberth 36' (1:1); Hegi 77' (2:3)	FCB summary FCA summary	6' (0:1) Hasler; 48' (1:2) Ceccaroni; 65' (1:3) Maradan; (yellow card) 85' Hasler

Stadion Brügglifeld, Aarau
Attendance: 6,800
Referee: (Switzerland) Arturo Martino (Neukirch an der Thur)

23 March 1983
19:30

Young Boys	1–0	Chênois
Peterhans 24' (1:0)	YB summary

Wankdorf Stadium, Bern
Attendance: 2,100
Referee: (Switzerland) Georges Sandoz (Corcelles-Cormondrèche, Neuchâtel)

== Quarter-finals ==
=== Summary ===
Team 1	Score	Team 2
12 April 1982
Neuchâtel Xamax	0–1	Delémont
Basel	2–1	Lausanne-Sport
Sion	2–0	Wettingen
Grasshopper Club	1–1 (a.e.t.)	Young Boys

Replay

Team 1	Score	Team 2
20 April 1982
Young Boys	1–1 (a.e.t.) (5–4 p)	Grasshopper Club

=== Matches ===
12 April 1982
16:30

Basel	2 – 1	Lausanne-Sport
Maradan 6' (1:0); Maissen 11' (2:0)	Summary	90' (2:1) Dario; (yellow card) Dario

St. Jakob Stadium, Basel
Attendance: 10,500
Referee: (Switzerland) Rudolf Affolter

12 April 1982
16:30

Grasshopper Club	1–1 (a.e.t.)	Young Boys
Zanetti 10' (1:0)	YB summary	66' (1:1) Schönenberger

Hardturm, Zürich
Attendance: 11,000
Referee: (Switzerland) Willy Hänni

Replay

20 April 1982

Young Boys	1–1 (a.e.t.)	Grasshopper Club
Meyer 53' (pen.)	YB summary	66' (1:1) Peterhans
Penalties
Conz (penalty scored); Zahnd (penalty missed); Schönenberger (penalty scored); Müller (penalty scored); Arm (penalty scored); Berkemeier (penalty scored)	5–4	(penalty scored) Hermann; (penalty scored) Egli; (penalty scored) Hächler; (penalty scored) Meyer; (penalty missed) Jara; (penalty missed) Sulser

Wankdorf Stadium, Bern
Attendance: 15,000
Referee: (Switzerland) Gottlieb Barmettler (Luzern)

== Semi-finals ==
=== Summary ===
Team 1	Score	Team 2
4 May 1982
Sion	2–0	Young Boys
Basel	2–0	Delémont

=== Matches ===
4 May 1982

Sion	2–0	Young Boys
Brigger 59' (1:0); Luisier 82' (2:0)	summary	(yellow card) 73' (yellow-red card) 89' Arm

Tourbillon, Sion
Attendance: 11,500
Referee: (Switzerland) Willi Hänni

4 May 1982
20:00

Basel	3–0	SR Delémont
Maissen 23' (1:0); Schribertschnig 86' (o.g. 2:0); Sutter 90' (3:0)	Summary

St. Jakob Stadium, Basel
Attendance: 10,200
Referee: (Switzerland) Jean-Marie Macheret

== Final ==
The final was held at the former Wankdorf Stadium in Bern on Whit Monday 1982.

=== Summary ===
Team 1	Score	Team 2
31 May 1982
Sion	1–0	Basel

=== Telegram ===
31 May 1982
14:30

Sion	1 – 0	Basel
Balet 23' (1:0); Bregy (yellow card) 59'; Lüthi (yellow card) 63'	FCB summary Fussball-Schweiz summary

Wankdorf Stadium, Bern
Attendance: 44,000
Referee: (Switzerland) Jean-Marie Macheret

Sion won the cup and this was the club's fourth cup title to this date.

== Further in Swiss football ==
- 1981–82 Nationalliga A
- 1981–82 Swiss 1. Liga

== Sources ==
- Fussball-Schweiz
- 1981–82 at fcb-achiv.ch
- Switzerland 1981–82 at RSSSF

Preceded by 1980–81	Swiss Cup seasons	Succeeded by 1982–83
