= Kurt Jara =

Austrian footballer and manager

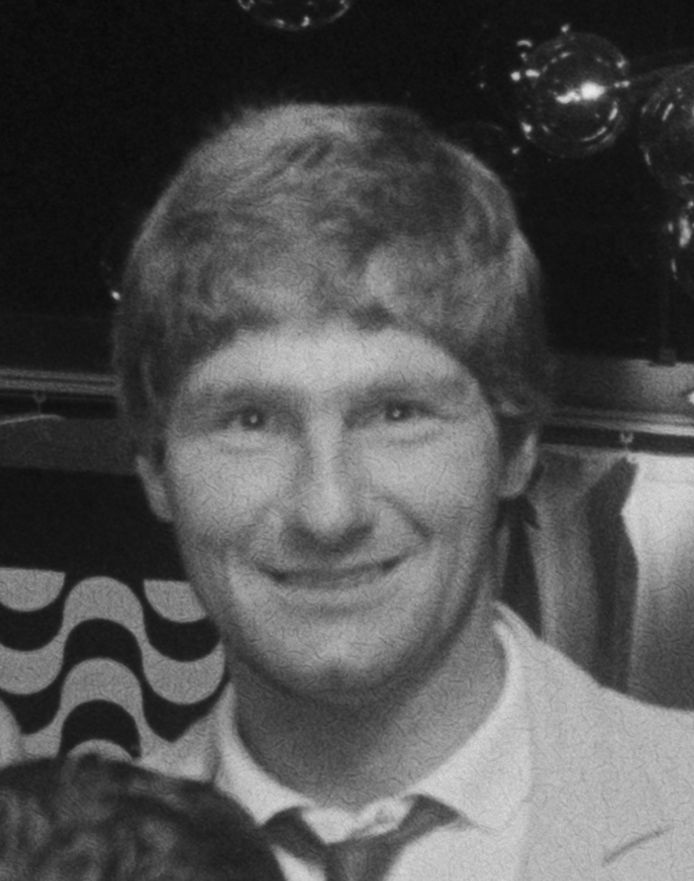
- Jara in 1984

Personal information
- Date of birth: 14 October 1950 (age 76)
- Place of birth: Innsbruck, Austria
- Height: 1.77 m (5 ft 10 in)
- Position: Midfielder

Senior career*
Years	Team	Apps	(Gls)
1968–1971	FC Wacker Innsbruck	57	(19)
1971–1973	SSW Innsbruck	57	(21)
1973–1975	Valencia	57	(11)
1975–1980	MSV Duisburg	160	(23)
1980–1981	Schalke 04	31	(2)
1981–1985	Grasshoppers	110	(25)
Total		472	(101)

International career
1971–1985	Austria	59	(14)

Managerial career
- 1986–1988: Grasshoppers
- 1988–1991: St. Gallen
- 1991–1994: FC Zürich
- 1994–1995: VfB Mödling
- 1996–1997: Xanthi
- 1997–1998: APOEL Nicosia
- 1999–2001: FC Tirol Innsbruck
- 2001–2003: Hamburger SV
- 2004–2005: 1. FC Kaiserslautern
- 2005–2006: Red Bull Salzburg
- * Club domestic league appearances and goals

Kurt Jara (born 14 October 1950) is an Austrian football manager and former player who played as a midfielder.

== Playing career ==
=== Club career ===
Born in Innsbruck, Jara started his professional career with local side FC Wacker Innsbruck before moving to Spanish outfit Valencia CF in 1973. After two seasons in La Liga he joined German Bundesliga team MSV Duisburg where he spent five seasons and reached the UEFA Cup semi-finals in 1979. After another season in Germany with FC Schalke 04, he finished his career in the Swiss Super League with Grasshoppers. Immediately after retiring as a player, he became manager at Grasshopper.

=== International career ===
Jara made his debut for Austria in a July 1971 friendly match in São Paulo against Brazil and was a participant at the 1978 and 1982 World Cups. He earned 59 caps, scoring 14 goals. His last international was an April 1985 World Cup qualification match against Hungary.

== Managerial career ==
As a manager, Jara coached in the past the Swiss clubs Grasshoppers, FC St. Gallen and FC Zürich, the Austrian team VfB Mödling, Xanthi, APOEL, FC Tirol Innsbruck, Hamburger SV and 1. FC Kaiserslautern. In the season 2005–06 he was the manager of Red Bull Salzburg.

== Career statistics ==
Appearances and goals by club, season and competition
Club	Season	League			Cup		Europe		Other		Total	
Club	Season	Division	Apps	Goals	Apps	Goals	Apps	Goals	Apps	Goals	Apps	Goals
FC Wacker Innsbruck	1968–69		0	0			–					
FC Wacker Innsbruck	1969–70	Nationalliga	30	7	1	0	–		–		31	7
FC Wacker Innsbruck	1970–71	Nationalliga	27	12	0	0	4	0	–		31	12
FC Wacker Innsbruck	Total		57	19	1	0	4	0	0	0	62	19
SSW Innsbruck	1971–72	Nationalliga	28	8	0	0	2	1	–		30	9
SSW Innsbruck	1972–73	Nationalliga	29	13	2	1	2	0	–		33	14
SSW Innsbruck	Total		57	21	2	1	4	1	0	0	63	23
Valencia	1973–74	Primera División	24	5	0	0	–		–		24	5
Valencia	1974–75	Primera División	33	6	0	0	–		–		33	6
Valencia	Total		57	11	0	0	0	0	0	0	57	11
MSV Duisburg	1975–76	Bundesliga	31	4	2	0	–		–		33	4
MSV Duisburg	1976–77	Bundesliga	34	7	4	1	–		–		38	8
MSV Duisburg	1977–78	Bundesliga	30	4	6	1	–		–		36	5
MSV Duisburg	1978–79	Bundesliga	34	4	4	0	10	2	–		48	6
MSV Duisburg	1979–80	Bundesliga	31	4	1	0	–		–		32	4
MSV Duisburg	Total		160	23	17	2	10	2	0	0	187	27
Schalke 04	1980–81	Bundesliga	31	2	1	0	–		–		32	2
Grasshoppers	1981–82	Swiss Super League	25	8			4	2	–		29	10
Grasshoppers	1982–83	Swiss Super League	29	7			2	0	–		31	7
Grasshoppers	1983–84	Swiss Super League	29	5			2	0	1 (Note: Appearance in league play-offs)	0	32	5
Grasshoppers	1984–85	Swiss Super League	27	5			4	1	–		31	6
Grasshoppers	Total		110	25			12	3	1	0	123	28
Career total			472	101	21	3	30	6	1	0	524	110

== Honours ==
=== Player ===
- Austrian Football Bundesliga: 1970–71, 1971–72, 1972–73
- Austrian Cup: 1969–70, 1972–73
- Swiss Super League: 1981–82, 1982–83, 1983–84
- Swiss Cup: 1982–83

=== Manager ===
Grasshoppers

- Swiss Cup: 1987–88

Hamburger SV

- DFL-Ligapokal: 2003
