= Charly In-Albon =

Swiss footballer (born 1957)

Personal information
- Date of birth: 23 June 1957 (age 69)
- Place of birth: Brig, Switzerland
- Height: 1.82 m (6 ft 0 in)
- Position: Defender

Senior career*
Years	Team	Apps	(Gls)
1975–1979	FC Sion	30	(0)
1979–1991	Grasshoppers	278	(15)

International career
1977–1984	Switzerland	40	(1)

Managerial career
- 1991–1992: FC Winterthur
- 1994–1996: FC Naters
- 1996–1997: Vevey-Sports
- 1998–1999: FC Sion
- * Club domestic league appearances and goals

Charly In-Albon (born 23 June 1957) is a Swiss former football player and manager. He played as a defender for FC Sion and Grasshoppers. He also represented the Switzerland national team, making 40 appearances and scoring one goal. He then became a manager.

== Honours ==
Grasshoppers

- Swiss Championship: 1981–82, 1982–83, 1983–84, 1989–90, 1990–91
- Swiss Cup: 1982–83, 1987–88, 1988–89, 1989–90
- Swiss Super Cup: 1989
