= 1980–81 Swiss 1. Liga =

1. Liga
- Season: 1980–81
- Champions: 1. Liga champions: FC Ibach; Group 1: FC Monthey; Group 2: FC Aurore Bienne; Group 3: FC Emmenbrücke; Group 4: FC Locarno
- Promoted: FC Ibach; FC Aurore Bienne; FC Monthey; FC Locarno; FC Altstätten
- Relegated: Group 1: FC Concordia Lausanne; Central Fribourg; Group 2: SV Muttenz; SC Binningen; Group 3: FC Herzogenbuchsee; FC Lerchenfeld; Group 4: FC Morbio; FC Bad Ragaz
- Matches: 4 times 182 plus 24 play-offs and 4 deciders

The 1980–81 1. Liga was the 49th season of this league since its creation in 1931. At this time, the 1. Liga was the third tier of the Swiss football league system and it was the highest level of amateur football.

== Format ==
There were 56 clubs in the 1. Liga, divided into four regional groups, each with 14 teams. Within each group, the teams would play a double round-robin to decide their league position. Two points were awarded for a win. The four group winners and the four runners-up contested a play-off round to decide the five promotion slots. The two last placed teams in each group were directly relegated to the 2. Liga (fourth tier).

The promotion round was played in two regional groups. The four top placed teams from groups 1 and 2 were in group West and the four top placed teams from groups 3 and 4 were in group East. Within each of these groups the teams contested another double round-robin. The first two teams in each group were directly promoted, while both the third placed teams had to contest a two-legged play-off, the winner of which was also promoted as fifth team to the 1981–82 Nationalliga B.

== Group 1 ==
=== Teams ===
Club	Canton	Stadium	Capacity
FC Central Fribourg	Fribourg	Guintzet	2,000
FC Concordia Lausanne	Vaud	Centre sportif de la Tuilière	1,000
Étoile Carouge FC	Geneva	Stade de la Fontenette	3,690
FC Fétigny	Fribourg	Stade Communal Fétigny	500
FC Leytron	Valais	Stade Saint-Martin	1,000
ES FC Malley	Vaud	Centre sportif de la Tuilière	1,500
FC Martigny-Sports	Valais	Stade d'Octodure	2,500
FC Monthey	Valais	Stade Philippe Pottier	1,800
FC Montreux-Sports	Vaud	Stade de Chailly	1,000
FC Orbe	Vaud	Stade du Puisoir	1,000
FC Raron	Valais	Sportplatz Rhoneglut	1,000
FC Renens	Waadt	Zone sportive du Censuy	2,300
FC Stade Lausanne	Vaud	Centre sportif de Vidy	1,000
FC Stade Nyonnais	Vaud	Stade de Colovray	7,200

=== Final league table ===
Pos	Team	Pld	W	D	L	GF	GA	GD	Pts	Qualification or relegation
1	FC Monthey	26	20	4	2	57	17	+40	44	Play-off to Nationalliga B
2	FC Stade Lausanne	26	12	7	7	54	43	+11	31	Play-off to Nationalliga B
3	Etoile Carouge FC	26	11	8	7	54	39	+15	30	
4	FC Renens	26	10	9	7	47	35	+12	29	
5	FC Orbe	26	11	6	9	61	58	+3	28	
6	FC Martigny-Sports	26	11	5	10	46	42	+4	27	
7	FC Montreux-Sports	26	10	4	12	46	45	+1	24	
8	FC Raron	26	7	10	9	28	30	−2	24	
9	ES FC Malley	26	8	7	11	35	44	−9	23	
10	FC Fétigny	26	8	7	11	38	53	−15	23	
11	FC Leytron	26	7	8	11	42	55	−13	22	
12	FC Stade Nyonnais	26	7	7	12	37	49	−12	21	
13	FC Concordia Lausanne	26	7	5	14	50	66	−16	19	Relegation to 2. Liga Interregional
14	Central Fribourg	26	7	5	14	43	62	−19	19	Relegation to 2. Liga Interregional

Source: RSSSF
Rules for classification: 1) Points; 2) Goal difference within the league, but decider play-off for qualifiers.

== Group 2 ==
=== Teams ===
Club	Canton	Stadium	Capacity
FC Allschwil	Basel-Country	Im Brüel, Allschwil	1,700
FC Aurore Bienne	Bern	Tilleul-Linde	1,000
SC Binningen	Basel-Country	Spiegelfeld	1,800
FC Birsfelden	Basel-Country	Sternenfeld	9,400
US Boncourt	Jura	Stade Communal Léon Burrus	1,640
FC Breitenbach	Solothurn	Grien	2,000
FC Boudry	Neuchâtel	Stade des Buchilles	1,500
SR Delémont	Jura	La Blancherie	5,263
SC Derendingen	Solothurn	Heidenegg	1,500
FC Köniz	Bern	Sportplatz Liebefeld-Hessgut	2,600
FC Laufen	Basel-Country	Sportplatz Nau	3,000
SV Muttenz	Basel-Country	Sportplatz Margelacker	3,200
FC Solothurn	Solothurn	Stadion FC Solothurn	6,750
FC Superga	Neuchâtel	Collège de la Charrière	1,000

=== Final league table ===
Pos	Team	Pld	W	D	L	GF	GA	GD	Pts	Qualification or relegation
1	FC Aurore Bienne	26	13	8	5	54	29	+25	34	Play-off to Nationalliga B
2	FC Birsfelden	26	12	9	5	34	26	+8	33	Play-off to Nationalliga B
3	SR Delémont	26	12	8	6	39	24	+15	32	
4	FC Laufen	26	11	9	6	39	26	+13	31	
5	FC Breitenbach	26	12	7	7	32	28	+4	31	
6	FC Köniz	26	10	8	8	41	44	−3	28	
7	FC Superga	26	9	9	8	33	31	+2	27	
8	FC Boudry	26	9	6	11	34	40	−6	24	
9	SC Derendingen	26	8	7	11	31	36	−5	23	
10	FC Solothurn	26	8	6	12	40	47	−7	22	
11	FC Allschwil	26	6	10	10	33	40	−7	22	
12	US Boncourt	26	5	12	9	33	43	−10	22	
13	SV Muttenz	26	8	4	14	38	41	−3	20	Relegation to 2. Liga Interregional
14	SC Binningen	26	4	7	15	25	51	−26	15	Relegation to 2. Liga Interregional

Source: RSSSF
Rules for classification: 1) Points; 2) Goal difference within the league, but decider play-off for qualifiers.

== Group 3 ==
=== Teams ===
Club	Canton	Stadium	Capacity
FC Baden	Aargau	Esp Stadium	7,000
FC Blue Stars Zürich	Zürich	Hardhof	1,000
SC Burgdorf	canton of Bern	Stadion Neumatt	3,850
SC Buochs	Nidwalden	Stadion Seefeld	5,000
FC Herzogenbuchsee	Bern	Waldäcker	1,000
FC Ibach	Schwyz	Gerbihof	3,300
SC Emmen	Lucerne	Sportanlage Feldbreite	500
FC Emmenbrücke	Lucerne	Stadion Gersag	8,700
FC Lerchenfeld	Bern	Sportanlagen Waldeck	2,400
FC Oberentfelden	Aargau	Schützenrain	1,500
FC Suhr	Aargau	Hofstattmatten	2,000
FC Sursee	Lucerne	Stadion Schlottermilch	3,500
FC Young Fellows Zürich	Zürich	Utogrund	2,850
SC Zug	Zug	Herti Allmend Stadion	6,000

=== Final league table ===
Pos	Team	Pld	W	D	L	GF	GA	GD	Pts	Qualification or relegation
1	FC Emmenbrücke	26	14	6	6	60	37	+23	34	Play-off to Nationalliga B
2	FC Ibach	26	12	10	4	38	20	+18	34	Play-off to Nationalliga B
3	SC Zug	26	11	11	4	52	32	+20	33	
4	FC Sursee	26	12	8	6	42	35	+7	32	
5	SC Buochs	26	9	9	8	45	37	+8	27	
6	FC Oberentfelden	26	9	9	8	37	41	−4	27	
7	FC Suhr	26	11	4	11	41	48	−7	26	
8	FC Baden	26	8	9	9	34	35	−1	25	
9	SC Burgdorf	26	8	7	11	32	36	−4	23	
10	FC Emmen	26	6	11	9	39	47	−8	23	
11	FC Blue Stars Zürich	26	6	10	10	31	40	−9	22	
12	SC Young Fellows	26	7	8	11	29	44	−15	22	
13	FC Herzogenbuchsee	26	5	8	13	27	42	−15	18	Relegation to 2. Liga Interregional
14	FC Lerchenfeld	26	6	6	14	37	50	−13	18	Relegation to 2. Liga Interregional

Source: RSSSF
Rules for classification: 1) Points; 2) Goal difference within the league, but decider play-off for qualifiers.

== Group 4 ==
=== Teams ===
Club	Canton	Stadium	Capacity
FC Altstätten (St. Gallen)	St. Gallen	Grüntal Altstätten	1,000
FC Bad Ragaz	St. Gallen	Ri-Au	100
FC Balzers	Liechtenstein	Sportplatz Rheinau	2,000
FC Gossau	St. Gallen	Sportanlage Buechenwald	3,500
FC Küsnacht	Zürich	Sportanlage Heslibach	2,300
FC Locarno	Locarno, Ticino	Stadio comunale Lido	5,000
US Morobbia Giubiasco	Ticino	Campo Semine	1,000
FC Morbio	Ticino	Campo comunale Balerna	800
FC Rüti	Zürich	Schützenwiese	1,200
FC Schaffhausen	Schaffhausen	Stadion Breite	7,300
FC Stäfa	Zürich	Sportanlage Frohberg	1,500
FC Turicum	Zürich	Hardhof	1,000
FC Uzwil	St. Gallen	Rüti	1,000
FC Vaduz	Liechtenstein	Rheinpark Stadion	7,584

=== Final league table ===
Pos	Team	Pld	W	D	L	GF	GA	GD	Pts	Qualification or relegation
1	FC Locarno	26	17	5	4	63	28	+35	39	Play-off to Nationalliga B
2	FC Altstätten (St. Gallen)	26	14	9	3	40	21	+19	37	Play-off to Nationalliga B
3	FC Vaduz	26	15	4	7	52	35	+17	34	
4	FC Schaffhausen	26	12	7	7	37	25	+12	31	
5	FC Gossau	26	14	2	10	52	41	+11	30	
6	FC Balzers	26	10	7	9	46	35	+11	27	
7	FC Küsnacht	26	8	11	7	25	23	+2	27	
8	FC Rüti	26	10	5	11	32	35	−3	25	
9	FC Turicum	26	8	9	9	31	39	−8	25	
10	FC Uzwil	26	8	7	11	42	48	−6	23	
11	FC Stäfa	26	4	11	11	21	33	−12	19	
12	US Morobbia Giubiasco	26	7	4	15	30	55	−25	18	
13	FC Morbio	26	3	11	12	27	42	−15	17	Relegation to 2. Liga Interregional
14	FC Bad Ragaz	26	5	2	19	27	65	−38	12	Relegation to 2. Liga Interregional

Source: RSSSF
Rules for classification: 1) Points; 2) Goal difference within the league, but decider play-off for qualifiers.

== Promotion round ==
=== Group West ===
Pos	Team	Pld	W	D	L	GF	GA	GD	Pts	Qualification or relegation
1	FC Monthey	6	4	2	0	11	6	+5	10	Promotion to 1981–82 Nationalliga B
2	FC Aurore Bienne	6	4	1	1	13	6	+7	9	Promotion to 1981–82 Nationalliga B
3	FC Stade Lausanne	6	2	1	3	21	16	+5	5	Qualification for decider
4	FC Birsfelden	6	0	0	6	3	20	−17	0	

Source: RSSSF
Rules for classification: 1) Points; 2) Goal difference within the league, but decider play-off for qualifiers.

=== Group East ===
Pos	Team	Pld	W	D	L	GF	GA	GD	Pts	Qualification or relegation
1	FC Ibach	6	3	1	2	9	5	+4	7	Promotion to 1981–82 Nationalliga B
2	FC Locarno	6	2	2	2	10	8	+2	6	To decider for second place
3	FC Altstätten (St. Gallen)	6	2	2	2	9	12	−3	6	To decider for second place
4	FC Emmenbrücke	6	2	1	3	8	11	−3	5	

Source: RSSSF
Rules for classification: 1) Points; 2) Goal difference within the league, but decider play-off for qualifiers.

==== Decider for second place in group East ====
The decider match for second group place was played on 29 June in Näfels

Team 1	Score	Team 2
FC Locarno	2–1	FC Altstätten

FC Locarno win and are promoted to 1981–82 Nationalliga B. FC Altstätten continue to decider for fifth position.

=== Decider for fifth league position ===
The decider matches for fifth promotion place were played on 28 June and 1 July.

Team 1	Score	Team 2
FC Altstätten	3–0	FC Stade Lausanne
FC Stade Lausanne	0–1	FC Altstätten

FC Altstätten win and are promoted to 1981–82 Nationalliga B. FC Stade Lausanne remain in the division.

=== Decider for 1. Liga championship ===
The championship decider was played on 28 June in Ibach.

Team 1	Score	Team 2
FC Ibach	1–0	FC Monthey

FC Ibach win and are 1. Liga champions.

== Further in Swiss football ==
- 1980–81 Nationalliga A
- 1980–81 Nationalliga B
- 1980–81 Swiss Cup

== Sources ==
- Switzerland 1980–81 at RSSSF

Preceded by 1979–80	Seasons in Swiss 1. Liga	Succeeded by 1981–82
