= 1981–82 Nationalliga A =

Swiss football season

Nationalliga A
- Season: 1981–82
- Champions: Grasshopper Club (18th title)
- Relegated: Nordstern Basel; Chiasso
- European Cup: Grasshopper Club
- Cup Winners' Cup: Sion
- UEFA Cup: Servette; Zürich
- Top goalscorer: Claudio Sulser (GC) 23 goals

Nationalliga B
- Season: 1981–82
- Champions: Winterthur
- Promoted: Winterthur; Wettingen
- Relegated: FC Aurore Bienne; FC Altstätten; Frauenfeld
- Top goalscorer: Roger Vergères (La Chaux-de-Fonds) 21 goals

Statistics of the Swiss National League in the 1981–82 football season, both Nationalliga A and Nationalliga B. This was the 85th season of top-tier and the 84th season of second-tier football in Switzerland.

== Overview ==
The Swiss Football Association (ASF/SFV) was expanded during the 1980–81 season from 28 to 32 member clubs. These were divided into two tiers of 16 teams each. The top tier was named Nationalliga A (NLA) and the second tier was named Nationalliga B (NLB).

The format in both divisions was that the teams played a double round-robin to decide their table positions. Each club playing every other club twice (home and away) for a total of 30 rounds. Two points were awarded for a win and one point was awarded for a draw. The Swiss champions would qualify for the 1982–83 European Cup, the runners-up and third placed team would qualify for the 1982–83 UEFA Cup. The last two placed teams in the NLA were relegated to the NLB for the following season. The top two placed teams in the NLB would be promoted to the top tier. The last three teams in the NLB were relegated to next season's 1. Liga and would be replaced by the best three teams from this season's 1. Liga.

== Nationalliga A ==
The top-tier, Nationalliga A (NLA), was contested by the top thirteen clubs from the previous season and three sides promoted from the second level 1980–81 Nationalliga B, these being Vevey-Sports, FC Aarau and FC Bulle. The first round was played on 15 August 1981. There was a winter break between 5 December and 27 February 1982. The season was completed on 9 June 1982.

=== Teams, locations ===
Locations of teams' home cities in the 1981–82 Swiss Football Championship

Team	Town	Canton	Position in 1980–81	Stadium	Capacity
FC Aarau	Aarau	Aargau	2nd in NLB	Stadion Brügglifeld	9,240
FC Basel	Basel	Basel-Stadt	6th	St. Jakob Stadium	36,800
AC Bellinzona	Bellinzona	Ticino	12th	Stadio Comunale Bellinzona	5,000
FC Bulle	Bulle	Fribourg	3rd in NLB	Stade de Bouleyres	7,000
FC Chiasso	Chiasso	Ticino	13th	Stadio Comunale Riva IV	4,000
Grasshopper Club	Zürich	Zürich	2nd	Hardturm	20,000
Lausanne-Sports	Lausanne	Vaud	5th	Pontaise	15,700
FC Luzern	Lucerne	Lucerne	9th	Stadion Allmend	25,000
Neuchâtel Xamax	Neuchâtel	Neuchâtel	3rd	Stade de la Maladière	25,500
Nordstern Basel	Basel	Basel-Stadt	11th	Rankhof	7,600
FC St. Gallen	St. Gallen	St. Gallen	10th	Espenmoos	11,000
Servette	Geneva	Geneva	7th	Stade des Charmilles	27,000
FC Sion	Sion	Valais	8th	Stade de Tourbillon	16,000
FC Vevey-Sports	Vevey	Vaud	1st in NLB	Stade de Copet	4,000
Young Boys	Bern	Bern	4th	Wankdorf Stadium	56,000
FC Zürich	Zürich	Zürich	Champions	Letzigrund	25,000

=== Final league table ===
Pos	Team	Pld	W	D	L	GF	GA	GD	Pts	Qualification or relegation
1	Grasshopper Club	30	21	7	2	72	24	+48	49	Swiss champions, qualified for 1982–83 European Cup
2	Servette	30	20	6	4	76	32	+44	46	Qualified for 1982–83 UEFA Cup
3	Zürich	30	18	10	2	62	25	+37	46	Qualified for 1982–83 UEFA Cup and entered 1982 Intertoto Cup
4	Xamax	30	18	9	3	67	30	+37	45	
5	Young Boys	30	15	9	6	52	40	+12	39	Entered 1982 Intertoto Cup
6	Sion	30	12	7	11	51	46	+5	31	Swiss Cup winners, qualified for 1982–83 Cup Winners' Cup
7	Aarau	30	10	8	12	51	55	−4	28	
8	Basel	30	11	6	13	47	51	−4	28	
9	Luzern	30	10	7	13	54	59	−5	27	Entered 1982 Intertoto Cup
10	St. Gallen	30	10	5	15	40	45	−5	25	Entered 1982 Intertoto Cup
11	Vevey-Sports	30	6	11	13	44	57	−13	23	
12	Bellinzona	30	7	7	16	34	66	−32	21	
13	Lausanne-Sport	30	6	8	16	39	52	−13	20	
14	Bulle	30	5	9	16	29	58	−29	19	
15	Nordstern Basel	30	6	5	19	29	69	−40	17	Relegated to 1982–83 Nationalliga B
16	Chiasso	30	4	8	18	25	63	−38	16	Relegated to 1982–83 Nationalliga B

Source: rsssf.com
Rules for classification: 1) points; 2) goal difference; 3) number of goals scored.

=== Results ===
Home \ Away	AAR	BAS	BEL	BUL	CHI	GCZ	LS	LUZ	NX	NOR	SER	SIO	STG	VEV	YB	ZÜR
Aarau		2–1	3–0	4–1	1–0	2–2	2–0	5–1	0–3	4–0	2–6	0–2	2–0	2–2	2–4	1–1
Basel	2–0		3–1	1–0	3–0	1–3	1–3	2–2	1–1	3–0	0–1	2–1	5–2	4–2	1–1	0–2
Bellinzona	0–3	1–1		3–1	5–1	1–2	3–0	1–1	1–0	3–0	0–4	1–1	1–3	2–1	0–0	1–1
Bulle	2–1	1–0	2–2		1–1	0–2	3–1	1–1	1–2	1–2	3–6	1–1	1–0	1–1	0–0	0–1
Chiasso	2–1	0–0	1–2	0–0		0–6	0–0	3–2	1–4	2–2	0–3	0–1	2–1	0–0	0–2	1–4
Grasshopper Club	3–1	3–0	4–1	5–2	2–0		3–1	3–1	2–2	1–0	3–0	2–2	3–2	5–1	3–0	2–2
Lausanne-Sports	2–2	2–3	5–1	4–0	2–2	1–1		1–0	1–1	0–0	2–5	1–0	0–1	1–1	0–1	1–2
Luzern	3–3	2–2	4–0	5–1	1–0	1–0	1–3		3–5	3–2	2–4	4–0	1–0	5–3	5–1	0–2
Neuchâtel Xamax	2–1	4–2	5–0	3–0	5–0	0–0	2–0	1–0		4–0	4–3	3–2	4–0	1–1	1–1	1–1
Nordstern Basel	0–1	3–4	1–2	1–2	0–3	0–4	1–0	0–1	0–0		0–2	1–0	4–0	3–1	4–1	0–3
Servette	2–0	1–0	3–1	1–1	1–1	2–1	2–2	3–0	4–0	4–0		2–2	4–1	3–0	4–1	1–1
Sion	4–0	3–2	2–1	1–0	3–1	1–2	3–2	3–1	2–4	3–2	0–1		3–1	1–3	1–1	1–1
St. Gallen	2–2	4–0	2–0	2–0	4–1	0–1	1–0	1–1	0–1	4–0	0–1	3–1		5–3	0–1	0–0
Vevey-Sports	1–1	0–1	3–0	1–1	3–2	0–0	5–2	3–0	0–2	5–1	1–1	0–4	0–0		2–2	0–1
Young Boys	5–1	3–1	3–1	1–0	3–1	0–3	1–0	3–3	2–1	1–1	1–0	2–2	3–1	5–1		3–0
Zürich	2–2	3–1	6–0	5–2	1–0	0–1	4–2	3–0	1–1	8–1	3–2	2–1	0–0	1–0	1–0	

Source: rsssf.com
Legend: Blue = home team win; Yellow = draw; Red = away team win.

=== Top scorers ===
Rank	Scorer	Nat.	Club	Goals
1	Claudio Sulser	SUI	Grasshopper Club	22
2	Marc Schnyder	SUI	Servette	16
3	Jean-Paul Brigger	SUI	Sion	15
3	Lucien Favre	SUI	Servette	15
3	Angelo Elia	SUI	Servette	15
6	Walter Seiler	SUI	Zürich	14
6	Roger Hegi	SUI	Aarau	14
8	Ottmar Hitzfeld	FRG	Luzern	13
9	Franz Peterhans	SUI	Young Boys	12
9	Peter Risi	SUI	Luzern	12
9	Don Givens	IRL	Xamax	12
9	Walter Pellegrini	SUI	Xamax	12
13	Jurica Jerković	YUG	Zürich	11
13	Alfred Herberth	FRG	Aarau	11
13	Georges Bregy	SUI	Sion	11
16	Hans-Peter Zwicker	SUI	Zürich	10
16	Mustapha Yaghcha	MAR	Servette	10
16	Gerhard Ritter	AUT	St. Gallen	10
16	Claude Andrey	SUI	Xamax	10

== Nationalliga B ==
The first round was played on 15 August 1981. There was a winter break between 5 December and 27 February 1982. The season was completed on 9 June 1982.

=== Teams, locations ===
Team	Town	Canton	Stadium	Capacity
FC Altstätten (St. Gallen)	Altstätten	St. Gallen	Grüntal Altstätten	1,000
FC Aurore Bienne	Biel/Bienne	Bern	Tilleul-Linde	1,000
FC Bern	Bern	Bern	Stadion Neufeld	14,000
FC Biel-Bienne	Biel/Bienne	Bern	Stadion Gurzelen	15,000
CS Chênois	Thônex	Geneva	Stade des Trois-Chêne	8,000
FC Frauenfeld	Frauenfeld	Thurgau	Kleine Allmend	6,370
FC Fribourg	Fribourg	Fribourg	Stade Universitaire	9,000
FC Grenchen	Grenchen	Solothurn	Stadium Brühl	15,100
FC Ibach	Ibach	Schwyz	Gerbihof	3,300
FC La Chaux-de-Fonds	La Chaux-de-Fonds	Neuchâtel	Centre Sportif de la Charrière	12,700
FC Locarno	Locarno	Ticino	Stadio comunale Lido	5,000
Lugano	Lugano	Ticino	Cornaredo Stadium	6,330
Mendrisiostar	Mendrisio	Ticino	Centro Sportivo Comunale	4,000
FC Monthey	Monthey	Valais	Stade Philippe Pottier	1,800
FC Wettingen	Wettingen	Aargau	Stadion Altenburg	10,000
FC Winterthur	Winterthur	Zürich	Schützenwiese	8,550

=== Final league table ===
Pos	Team	Pld	W	D	L	GF	GA	GD	Pts	Promotion or relegation
1	Winterthur	30	19	7	4	65	26	+39	45	Promoted to 1982–83 Nationalliga A
2	Wettingen	30	17	10	3	60	29	+31	44	Promoted to 1982–83 Nationalliga A
3	Chênois	30	16	8	6	52	30	+22	40	
4	La Chaux-de-Fonds	30	14	9	7	64	36	+28	37	
5	Grenchen	30	11	12	7	46	34	+12	34	
6	Mendrisiostar	30	14	6	10	45	53	−8	34	
7	Lugano	30	11	9	10	55	49	+6	31	
8	Locarno	30	11	8	11	54	40	+14	30	
9	Biel-Bienne	30	8	14	8	51	47	+4	30	
10	Bern	30	9	8	13	45	57	−12	26	
11	Ibach	30	6	13	11	36	47	−11	25	
12	Fribourg	30	7	10	13	37	47	−10	24	
13	Monthey	30	8	7	15	34	47	−13	23	
14	FC Aurore Bienne	30	7	8	15	26	64	−38	22	Relegated to 1982–83 1. Liga
15	FC Altstätten (St. Gallen)	30	4	12	14	25	56	−31	20	Relegated to 1982–83 1. Liga
16	Frauenfeld	30	3	9	18	26	59	−33	15	Relegated to 1982–83 1. Liga

Source: rsssf.com
Rules for classification: 1) points; 2) goal difference; 3) number of goals scored.

== Further in Swiss football ==
- 1981–82 Swiss Cup
- 1981–82 Swiss 1. Liga

== Sources ==
- Switzerland 1981–82 at RSSSF

Preceded by 1980–81	Nationalliga seasons in Switzerland	Succeeded by 1982–83
