= 1982–83 Swiss 1. Liga =

1. Liga
- Season: 1982–83
- Champions: 1. Liga champion: FC Martigny-Sports; Group 1: Etoile Carouge FC; Group 2: BSC Old Boys; FC Birsfelden; Group 3: SC Kriens; Group 4: FC Altstätten
- Promoted: FC Martigny-Sports; SC Zug; FC Red Star Zürich
- Relegated: Group 1: FC Orbe; FC Sierre; Group 2: FC Bôle; FC Superga; Group 3: FC Tresa; US Giubiasco; Group 4: FC Blue Stars Zürich; FC Widnau
- Matches: 4 times 182 and 2 deciders plus 16 play-offs and 6 play-outs

The 1982–83 1. Liga was the 51st season of this league since its creation in 1931. At this time, the 1. Liga was the third tier of the Swiss football league system and it was the highest level of amateur football.

== Format ==
There were 56 clubs in the 1. Liga, divided into four regional groups, each with 14 teams. Within each group, the teams would play a double round-robin to decide their league position. Two points were awarded for a win. The four group winners and the four runners-up contested a first play-off round to decide three promotion slots. The two last placed teams in each group were directly relegated to the 2. Liga (fourth tier).

== Group 1 ==
=== Teams ===
Club	Canton	Stadium	Capacity
Étoile Carouge FC	Geneva	Stade de la Fontenette	3,690
FC Fétigny	Fribourg	Stade Communal - Fétigny	500
FC Leytron	Valais	Stade Saint-Martin	1,000
ES FC Malley	Vaud	Centre Sportif de la Tuilière	1,500
FC Martigny-Sports	Valais	Stade d'Octodure	2,500
FC Montreux-Sports	Vaud	Stade de Chailly	1,000
FC Raron	Valais	Sportplatz Rhoneglut	1,000
FC Renens	Waadt	Zone sportive du Censuy	2,300
FC Saint-Jean GE	Geneva	Centre sportif de Varembé	3,000
FC Sierre	Valais	Complexe Ecossia	2,000
FC Stade Lausanne	Vaud	Centre sportif de Vidy	1,000
FC Stade Nyonnais	Vaud	Stade de Colovray	7,200
FC Orbe	Vaud	Stade du Puisoir	1,000
Yverdon-Sport FC	Vaud	Stade Municipal	6,600

=== Final league table ===
Pos	Team	Pld	W	D	L	GF	GA	GD	Pts	Qualification or relegation
1	Etoile Carouge FC	26	18	5	3	66	20	+46	41	Play-off to Nationalliga B
2	FC Martigny-Sports	26	16	5	5	85	36	+49	37	Play-off to Nationalliga B
3	Yverdon-Sport FC	26	11	9	6	37	23	+14	31	
4	FC Renens	26	11	9	6	37	33	+4	31	
5	FC Montreux-Sports	26	9	12	5	39	28	+11	30	
6	FC Saint-Jean GE	26	12	6	8	40	41	−1	30	
7	ES FC Malley	26	12	3	11	51	52	−1	27	
8	FC Stade Nyonnais	26	8	9	9	39	35	+4	25	
9	FC Stade Lausanne	26	8	9	9	37	40	−3	25	
10	FC Leytron	26	7	7	12	31	44	−13	21	
11	FC Fétigny	26	7	6	13	33	43	−10	20	
12	FC Raron	26	7	6	13	24	45	−21	20	Play-out against relegation
13	FC Orbe	26	4	8	14	32	67	−35	16	Relegation to 2. Liga Interregional
14	FC Sierre	26	3	4	19	19	63	−44	10	Relegation to 2. Liga Interregional

Source: RSSSF
Rules for classification: 1) Points; 2) Goal difference within the league, but decider play-off for qualifiers.

== Group 2 ==
=== Teams ===
Club	Canton	Stadium	Capacity
FC Allschwil	Basel-Country	Im Brüel Allschwil	1,700
FC Aurore Bienne	Bern	Tilleul-Linde	1,000
FC Birsfelden	Basel-Country	Sternenfeld	9,400
FC Bôle	Neuchâtel	Champ Rond	1,000
US Boncourt	Jura	Stade Communal Léon Burrus	1,640
FC Boudry	Neuchâtel	Stade des Buchilles	1,500
FC Breitenbach	Solothurn	Grien	2,000
SC Burgdorf	canton of Bern	Stadion Neumatt	3,850
FC Concordia Basel	Basel-City	Stadion Rankhof	7,000
SR Delémont	Jura	La Blancherie	5,263
FC Köniz	Bern	Sportplatz Liebefeld-Hessgut	2,600
BSC Old Boys	Basel-Stadt	Stadion Schützenmatte	8,000
FC Solothurn	Solothurn	Stadion FC Solothurn	6,750
FC Superga	Neuchâtel	Collège de la Charrière	1,000

=== Final league table ===
Pos	Team	Pld	W	D	L	GF	GA	GD	Pts	Qualification or relegation
1	BSC Old Boys	26	14	7	5	57	36	+21	35	Play-off to Nationalliga B
2	SR Delémont	26	11	10	5	44	32	+12	32	Play-off to Nationalliga B
3	FC Boudry	26	12	7	7	52	35	+17	31	
4	FC Breitenbach	26	11	8	7	53	38	+15	30	
5	FC Aurore Bienne	26	8	13	5	42	28	+14	29	
6	SC Burgdorf	26	9	10	7	61	42	+19	28	
7	FC Concordia Basel	26	10	7	9	49	43	+6	27	
8	US Boncourt	26	8	10	8	37	44	−7	26	
9	FC Köniz	26	8	10	8	33	38	−5	25	
10	FC Solothurn	26	10	5	11	37	42	−5	25	
11	FC Allschwil	26	9	6	11	34	38	−4	24	
12	FC Birsfelden	26	7	9	10	32	45	−13	23	Play-out against relegation
13	FC Bôle	26	5	9	12	44	63	−19	19	Relegation to 2. Liga Interregional
14	FC Superga	26	1	7	18	20	71	−51	8	Relegation to 2. Liga Interregional

Source: RSSSF
Rules for classification: 1) Points; 2) Goal difference within the league, but decider play-off for qualifiers.

The game Superga-Köniz was not played, the game was valued 0–0 but no points were awarded.

== Group 3 ==
=== Teams ===
Club	Canton	Stadium	Capacity
FC Brugg	Aargau	Stadion Au	3,300
SC Buochs	Nidwalden	Stadion Seefeld	5,000
SC Emmen	Lucerne	Sportanlage Feldbreite	500
FC Emmenbrücke	Lucerne	Stadion Gersag	8,700
US Giubiasco	Ticino	Campo Semine	1,000
FC Klus-Balsthal	Solothurn	Sportplatz Moos	4,000
SC Kriens	Lucerne	Stadion Kleinfeld	5,100
FC Oberentfelden	Aargau	Schützenrain	1,500
FC Olten	Solothurn	Sportanlagen Kleinholz	8,000
FC Suhr	Aargau	Hofstattmatten	2,000
FC Sursee	Lucerne	Stadion Schlottermilch	3,500
FC Tresa/Monteggio	Ticino	Centro Sportivo Passera	1,280
FC Zug	Zug	Herti Allmend Stadion	6,000
SC Zug	Zug	Herti Allmend Stadion	6,000

=== Final league table ===
Pos	Team	Pld	W	D	L	GF	GA	GD	Pts	Qualification or relegation
1	SC Kriens	26	17	7	2	63	27	+36	41	Play-off to Nationalliga B
2	SC Zug	26	19	2	5	62	29	+33	40	Play-off to Nationalliga B
3	FC Olten	26	13	8	5	49	29	+20	34	
4	FC Suhr	26	11	8	7	47	35	+12	30	
5	FC Emmen	26	12	6	8	57	46	+11	30	
6	FC Zug	26	10	8	8	36	26	+10	28	
7	FC Klus-Balsthal	26	9	6	11	44	50	−6	24	
8	FC Emmenbrücke	26	8	7	11	43	41	+2	23	
9	FC Brugg	26	8	7	11	38	50	−12	23	
10	FC Sursee	26	7	8	11	36	46	−10	22	
11	SC Buochs	26	7	6	13	34	58	−24	20	
12	FC Oberentfelden	26	6	6	14	26	41	−15	18	Decider for twelfth place
13	FC Tresa	26	4	10	12	27	52	−25	18	Decider for twelfth place
14	US Giubiasco	26	4	5	17	35	67	−32	13	Relegation to 2. Liga Interregional

Source: RSSSF
Rules for classification: 1) Points; 2) Goal difference within the league, but decider play-off for qualifiers.

=== Decider for twelfth place ===
The decider was played on 29 May in Zug.

Team 1	Score	Team 2
FC Oberentfelden	2–1	FC Tresa

FC Oberentfelden win and continue in play-outs. FC Tresa are relegated directly to 2. Liga Interregional.

== Group 4 ==
=== Teams ===
Club	Canton	Stadium	Capacity
FC Altstätten (St. Gallen)	St. Gallen	Grüntal Altstätten	1,000
FC Balzers	Liechtenstein	Sportplatz Rheinau	2,000
FC Blue Stars Zürich	Zürich	Hardhof	1,000
FC Brüttisellen	Zürich	Lindenbuck	1,000
FC Einsiedeln	Schwyz	Rappenmöösli	1,300
FC Frauenfeld	Thurgau	Kleine Allmend	6,370
FC Kreuzlingen	Thurgau	Sportplatz Hafenareal	1,200
FC Küsnacht	Zürich	Sportanlage Heslibach	2,300
FC Red Star Zürich	Zürich	Allmend Brunau	2,000
FC Schaffhausen	Schaffhausen	Stadion Breite	7,300
FC Turicum	Zürich	Hardhof	1,000
FC Uzwil	St. Gallen	Rüti	1,000
FC Vaduz	Liechtenstein	Rheinpark Stadion	7,584
FC Widnau	Zürich	Sportanlage Aegeten	2,000

=== Final league table ===
Pos	Team	Pld	W	D	L	GF	GA	GD	Pts	Qualification or relegation
1	FC Altstätten (St. Gallen)	26	21	3	2	80	31	+49	45	Play-off to Nationalliga B
2	FC Red Star Zürich	26	18	3	5	65	31	+34	39	Play-off to Nationalliga B
3	FC Schaffhausen	26	15	6	5	67	36	+31	36	
4	FC Turicum	26	9	11	6	32	22	+10	29	
5	FC Brüttisellen	26	9	9	8	41	34	+7	27	
6	FC Küsnacht	26	11	4	11	34	39	−5	26	
7	FC Kreuzlingen	26	9	7	10	43	44	−1	25	
8	FC Balzers	26	7	10	9	40	46	−6	24	
9	FC Einsiedeln	26	9	4	13	49	64	−15	22	
10	FC Frauenfeld	26	7	7	12	37	43	−6	21	
11	FC Vaduz	26	5	10	11	29	42	−13	20	
12	FC Uzwil	26	7	5	14	31	53	−22	19	Decider for twelfth place
13	FC Blue Stars Zürich	26	7	5	14	34	50	−16	19	Decider for twelfth place
14	FC Widnau	26	4	4	18	33	80	−47	12	Relegation to 2. Liga Interregional

Source: RSSSF
Rules for classification: 1) Points; 2) Goal difference within the league, but decider play-off for qualifiers.

=== Decider for twelfth place ===
The decider was played on 29 May in Frauenfeld.

Team 1	Score	Team 2
FC Uzwil	4–2	FC Blue Stars Zürich

FC Uzwil win and continue in play-outs. FC Blue Stars Zürich are relegated directly to 2. Liga Interregional.

== Promotion play-off ==
=== Qualification round ===
Team 1	Score	Team 2
FC Martigny-Sports	2–1	FC Altstätten (St. Gallen)
FC Altstätten (St. Gallen)	1–2	FC Martigny-Sports

FC Martigny-Sports win 4–2 on aggregate and continue to the finals.

Team 1	Score	Team 2
Etoile Carouge FC	1–1	FC Red Star Zürich
FC Red Star Zürich	3–1	Etoile Carouge FC

FC Red Star Zürich win 4–2 on aggregate and continue to the finals.

Team 1	Score	Team 2
SC Zug	3–0	BSC Old Boys
BSC Old Boys	1–2	SC Zug

SC Zug win 5–1 on aggregate and continue to the finals.

Team 1	Score	Team 2
SR Delémont	0–0	SC Kriens
SC Kriens	0–0	SR Delémont
SR Delémont	0–2	SC Kriens

SC Kriens win the replay and continue to the finals.

=== Final round ===
Team 1	Score	Team 2
FC Red Star Zürich	1–2	SC Zug
SC Zug	2–1	FC Red Star Zürich

SC Zug win 4–2 on aggregate and are promoted to 1983–84 Nationalliga B.

Team 1	Score	Team 2
FC Martigny-Sports	3–2	SC Kriens
SC Kriens	2–2	FC Martigny-Sports

FC Martigny-Sports win 5–2 on aggregate and are promoted to 1983–84 Nationalliga B.

=== Decider for third place ===
The decider was played on 25 and 28 June.

Team 1	Score	Team 2
SC Kriens	0–4	FC Red Star Zürich
FC Red Star Zürich	2–1	SC Kriens

FC Red Star Zürich win 6–1 on aggregate and are promoted to 1983–84 Nationalliga B. SC Kriens remain in 1. Liga.

=== Decider for 1. Liga championship ===
The decider was played on 24 June in Martigny.

Team 1	Score	Team 2
FC Martigny-Sports	4–1	SC Zug

FC Martigny-Sports win and are 1. Liga champions.

== Relegation play-out ==
=== First round ===
Team 1	Score	Team 2
FC Raron	2–0	FC Birsfelden
FC Birsfelden	0–2	FC Raron

FC Raron win 4–2 on aggregate. FC Birsfelden continue to the final.

Team 1	Score	Team 2
FC Uzwil	3–1	FC Oberentfelden
FC Oberentfelden	1–1	FC Uzwil

FC Uzwil win 4–2 on aggregate. FC Oberentfelden continue to the final.

=== Final round ===
Team 1	Score	Team 2
FC Oberentfelden	2–3	FC Birsfelden
FC Birsfelden	1–3	FC Oberentfelden

FC Oberentfelden win 5–4 on aggregate. FC Birsfelden are relegated to 2. Liga.

== Further in Swiss football ==
- 1982–83 Nationalliga A
- 1982–83 Nationalliga B
- 1982–83 Swiss Cup

== Sources ==
- Switzerland 1982–83 at RSSSF

Preceded by 1981–82	Seasons in Swiss 1. Liga	Succeeded by 1983–84
