= 1981–82 Swiss 1. Liga =

1. Liga
- Season: 1981–82
- Champions: 1. Liga champions: FC Laufen; Group 1: Etoile Carouge FC; Group 2: FC Laufen; Group 3: FC Baden; Group 4: FC Schaffhausen
- Promoted: FC Laufen; FC Baden; FC Rüti
- Relegated: Group 1: FC Onex; CS La Tour-de-Peilz; Group 2: FC Estavayer-le-Lac; SC Derendingen; Group 3: Morobbia Giubiasco; FC Buchs (AG); Group 4: FC Gossau; FC Stäfa
- Matches: 4 times 182 and 3 deciders plus 16 play-offs and 6 play-outs

The 1981–82 1. Liga was exactly the 50th season of this league since its creation in 1931. At this time, the 1. Liga was the third tier of the Swiss football league system and it was the highest level of amateur football.

== Format ==
There were 56 clubs in the 1. Liga, divided into four regional groups, each with 14 teams. Within each group, the teams would play a double round-robin to decide their league position. Two points were awarded for a win. The four group winners and the four runners-up contested a play-off round with finals to decide the three promotion slots. The two last placed teams in each group were directly relegated to the 2. Liga (fourth tier).

== Group 1 ==
=== Teams ===
Club	Canton	Stadium	Capacity
FC Boudry	Neuchâtel	Stade des Buchilles	1,500
Étoile Carouge FC	Geneva	Stade de la Fontenette	3,690
CS La Tour-de-Peilz	Vaud	Stade de Bel-Air	1,000
FC Leytron	Valais	Stade Saint-Martin	1,000
ES FC Malley	Vaud	Centre Sportif de la Tuilière	1,500
FC Martigny-Sports	Valais	Stade d'Octodure	2,500
FC Montreux-Sports	Vaud	Stade de Chailly	1,000
FC Onex	Geneva	Stade municipal d'Onex	2,000
FC Orbe	Vaud	Stade du Puisoir	1,000
FC Raron	Valais	Sportplatz Rhoneglut	1,000
FC Renens	Waadt	Zone sportive du Censuy	2,300
FC Stade Lausanne	Vaud	Centre sportif de Vidy	1,000
FC Stade Nyonnais	Vaud	Stade de Colovray	7,200
Yverdon-Sport FC	Vaud	Stade Municipal	6,600

=== Final league table ===
Pos	Team	Pld	W	D	L	GF	GA	GD	Pts	Qualification or relegation
1	Etoile Carouge FC	26	18	2	6	68	31	+37	38	Play-off to Nationalliga B
2	Yverdon-Sport FC	26	17	2	7	51	32	+19	36	To decider for second place
3	FC Renens	26	15	6	5	48	35	+13	36	To decider for second place
4	FC Martigny-Sports	26	13	4	9	64	45	+19	30	
5	FC Orbe	26	12	5	9	68	59	+9	29	
6	FC Boudry	26	12	4	10	44	46	−2	28	
7	FC Leytron	26	10	6	10	50	56	−6	26	
8	FC Raron	26	9	7	10	31	33	−2	25	
9	FC Montreux-Sports	26	10	4	12	40	33	+7	24	
10	FC Stade Nyonnais	26	9	5	12	38	44	−6	23	
11	ES FC Malley	26	7	7	12	44	58	−14	21	
12	FC Stade Lausanne	26	8	3	15	38	61	−23	19	Decider for twelfth place
13	FC Onex	26	7	5	14	26	39	−13	19	Decider for twelfth place
14	CS La Tour-de-Peilz	26	4	2	20	39	77	−38	10	Relegation to 2. Liga Interregional

Source: RSSSF
Rules for classification: 1) Points; 2) Goal difference within the league, but decider play-off for qualifiers.

=== Decider for second place ===
The decider match for second place was played on 26 May in Martigny.

Team 1	Score	Team 2
Yverdon-Sport FC	1–0	FC Renens

Yverdon-Sport FC win and advance to play-offs. FC Renens remain in the division.

=== Decider for twelfth place ===
The decider match for twelfth was played on 26 May in Nyon.

Team 1	Score	Team 2
FC Stade Lausanne	5–1	FC Onex

FC Stade Lausanne win and continue in the play-outs. FC Onex are relegated directly to 2. Liga Interregional.

== Group 2 ==
=== Teams ===
Club	Canton	Stadium	Capacity
FC Allschwil	Basel-Country	Im Brüel, Allschwil	1,700
FC Birsfelden	Basel-Country	Sternenfeld	9,400
US Boncourt	Jura	Stade Communal Léon Burrus	1,640
FC Breitenbach	Solothurn	Grien	2,000
SC Burgdorf	canton of Bern	Stadion Neumatt	3,850
SR Delémont	Jura	La Blancherie	5,263
SC Derendingen	Solothurn	Heidenegg	1,500
FC Estavayer-le-Lac	Fribourg	Terrain des Grèves - Estavayer/Lac	200
FC Fétigny	Fribourg	Stade Communal - Fétigny	500
FC Köniz	Bern	Sportplatz Liebefeld-Hessgut	2,600
FC Laufen	Basel-Country	Sportplatz Nau	3,000
BSC Old Boys	Basel-Stadt	Stadion Schützenmatte	8,000
FC Solothurn	Solothurn	Stadion FC Solothurn	6,750
FC Superga	Neuchâtel	Collège de la Charrière	1,000

=== Final league table ===
Pos	Team	Pld	W	D	L	GF	GA	GD	Pts	Qualification or relegation
1	FC Laufen	26	16	9	1	50	16	+34	41	Play-off to Nationalliga B
2	SR Delémont	26	15	6	5	57	27	+30	36	Play-off to Nationalliga B
3	SC Burgdorf	26	14	7	5	56	39	+17	35	
4	BSC Old Boys	26	9	8	9	62	50	+12	26	
5	FC Allschwil	26	7	12	7	31	30	+1	26	
6	FC Köniz	26	10	6	10	34	42	−8	26	
7	FC Superga	26	8	9	9	27	32	−5	25	
8	FC Solothurn	26	10	4	12	38	51	−13	24	
9	US Boncourt	26	8	7	11	41	38	+3	23	
10	FC Fétigny	26	8	7	11	32	40	−8	23	
11	FC Birsfelden	26	9	4	13	34	44	−10	22	
12	FC Breitenbach	26	5	11	10	29	35	−6	21	Play-out against relegation
13	FC Estavayer-le-Lac	26	7	6	13	43	67	−24	20	Relegation to 2. Liga Interregional
14	SC Derendingen	26	5	6	15	27	50	−23	16	Relegation to 2. Liga Interregional

Source: RSSSF
Rules for classification: 1) Points; 2) Goal difference within the league, but decider play-off for qualifiers.

== Group 3 ==
=== Teams ===
Club	Canton	Stadium	Capacity
FC Baden	Aargau	Esp Stadium	7,000
FC Buchs (AG)	Aargau	Sportanlage Wynenfeld	1,130
SC Buochs	Nidwalden	Stadion Seefeld	5,000
SC Emmen	Lucerne	Sportanlage Feldbreite	500
FC Emmenbrücke	Lucerne	Stadion Gersag	8,700
US Giubiasco	Ticino	Campo Semine	1,000
SC Kriens	Lucerne	Stadion Kleinfeld	5,100
FC Oberentfelden	Aargau	Schützenrain	1,500
Morobbia Giubiasco	Ticino	Campo Semine	1,000
FC Olten	Solothurn	Sportanlagen Kleinholz	8,000
FC Suhr	Aargau	Hofstattmatten	2,000
FC Sursee	Lucerne	Stadion Schlottermilch	3,500
FC Zug	Zug	Herti Allmend Stadion	6,000
SC Zug	Zug	Herti Allmend Stadion	6,000

=== Final league table ===
Pos	Team	Pld	W	D	L	GF	GA	GD	Pts	Qualification or relegation
1	FC Baden	26	14	6	6	56	30	+26	34	Play-off to Nationalliga B
2	SC Zug	26	15	4	7	53	28	+25	34	Play-off to Nationalliga B
3	FC Emmenbrücke	26	15	3	8	52	33	+19	33	
4	FC Sursee	26	9	11	6	34	36	−2	29	
5	SC Kriens	26	11	6	9	44	37	+7	28	
6	FC Emmen	26	11	6	9	51	48	+3	28	
7	FC Suhr	26	9	9	8	33	29	+4	27	
8	FC Zug	26	10	6	10	44	38	+6	26	
9	FC Olten	26	9	8	9	44	42	+2	26	
10	FC Oberentfelden	26	8	8	10	32	40	−8	24	
11	US Giubiasco	26	6	9	11	36	41	−5	21	
12	SC Buochs	26	9	3	14	31	45	−14	21	Play-out against relegation
13	Morobbia Giubiasco	26	7	6	13	34	59	−25	20	Relegation to 2. Liga Interregional
14	FC Buchs (AG)	26	4	5	17	26	64	−38	13	Relegation to 2. Liga Interregional

Source: RSSSF
Rules for classification: 1) Points; 2) Goal difference within the league, but decider play-off for qualifiers.

== Group 4 ==
=== Teams ===
Club	Canton	Stadium	Capacity
FC Balzers	Liechtenstein	Sportplatz Rheinau	2,000
FC Blue Stars Zürich	Zürich	Hardhof	1,000
FC Brüttisellen	Zürich	Lindenbuck	1,000
FC Gossau	St. Gallen	Sportanlage Buechenwald	3,500
FC Kreuzlingen	Thurgau	Sportplatz Hafenareal	1,200
FC Küsnacht	Zürich	Sportanlage Heslibach	2,300
FC Red Star Zürich	Zürich	Allmend Brunau	2,000
FC Rüti	Zürich	Schützenwiese	1,200
FC Schaffhausen	Schaffhausen	Stadion Breite	7,300
FC Stäfa	Zürich	Sportanlage Frohberg	1,500
FC Turicum	Zürich	Hardhof	1,000
FC Uzwil	St. Gallen	Rüti	1,000
FC Vaduz	Liechtenstein	Rheinpark Stadion	7,584
FC Young Fellows Zürich	Zürich	Utogrund	2,850

=== Final league table ===
Pos	Team	Pld	W	D	L	GF	GA	GD	Pts	Qualification or relegation
1	FC Schaffhausen	26	15	6	5	49	21	+28	36	Play-off to Nationalliga B
2	FC Red Star Zürich	26	13	8	5	52	30	+22	34	To decider for second place
3	FC Rüti	26	11	12	3	46	30	+16	34	To decider for second place
4	FC Kreuzlingen	26	11	8	7	36	31	+5	30	
5	FC Balzers	26	10	7	9	31	22	+9	27	
6	FC Blue Stars Zürich	26	12	3	11	31	33	−2	27	
7	FC Turicum	26	9	7	10	37	36	+1	25	
8	FC Brüttisellen	26	10	5	11	43	47	−4	25	
9	FC Vaduz	26	10	5	11	40	47	−7	25	
10	FC Küsnacht	26	7	9	10	28	36	−8	23	
11	FC Uzwil	26	5	10	11	23	39	−16	20	
12	FC Young Fellows Zürich	26	9	2	15	38	58	−20	20	Play-out against relegation
13	FC Gossau	26	5	9	12	41	51	−10	19	Relegation to 2. Liga Interregional
14	FC Stäfa	26	5	9	12	28	42	−14	19	Relegation to 2. Liga Interregional

Source: RSSSF
Rules for classification: 1) Points; 2) Goal difference within the league, but decider play-off for qualifiers.

=== Decider for second place ===
The decider match for second place was played on 26 May in Wallisellen

Team 1	Score	Team 2
FC Rüti	2–1 a.e.t.	FC Blue Stars Zürich

FC Rüti win and advance to play-offs. FC Blue Stars Zürich remain in the division.

== Promotion play-off ==
=== Qualification round ===
Team 1	Score	Team 2
SC Zug	1–1	FC Laufen
FC Laufen	0–0	SC Zug

FC Laufen win on away goals and continue to the finals.

Team 1	Score	Team 2
FC Baden	3–1	Yverdon-Sport FC
Yverdon-Sport FC	0–2	FC Baden

FC Baden win 5–1 on aggregate and continue to the finals.

Team 1	Score	Team 2
FC Rüti	0–0	Etoile Carouge FC
Etoile Carouge FC	3–4	FC Rüti

FC Rüti win 4–3 on aggregate and continue to the finals.

Team 1	Score	Team 2
FC Schaffhausen	1–1	SR Delémont
SR Delémont	0–0	FC Schaffhausen

SR Delémont win on away goals and continue to the finals.

=== Final round ===
Team 1	Score	Team 2
FC Laufen	3–1	SR Delémont
SR Delémont	0–0	FC Laufen

FC Laufen win 3–1 on aggregate and are promoted to 1982–83 Nationalliga B.

Team 1	Score	Team 2
FC Baden	1–0	FC Rüti
FC Rüti	1–0	FC Baden
FC Baden	1–0	FC Rüti

FC Baden win the replay and are promoted to 1982–83 Nationalliga B.

=== Decider for third place ===
Team 1	Score	Team 2
FC Rüti	3–1	SR Delémont
SR Delémont	1–1	FC Rüti

FC Rüti win 4–2 on aggregate and are promoted to 1982–83 Nationalliga B. SR Delémont remain in 1. Liga.

=== Decider for 1. Liga championship ===
Team 1	Score	Team 2
FC Laufen	3–1	FC Baden

FC Laufen win and are 1. Liga champions.

== Relegation play-out ==
=== First round ===
Team 1	Score	Team 2
FC Breitenbach	3–1	FC Stade Lausanne
FC Stade Lausanne	3–0	FC Breitenbach

FC Stade Lausanne win 4–3 on aggregate and remain in division. FC Breitenbach continue to the final.

Team 1	Score	Team 2
SC Buochs	1–1	FC Young Fellows Zürich
FC Young Fellows Zürich	0–3	SC Buochs

SC Buochs win 4–1 on aggregate and remain in division. FC Young Fellows Zürich continue to the final.

=== Final round ===
Team 1	Score	Team 2
FC Young Fellows Zürich	0–2	FC Breitenbach
FC Breitenbach	2–1	FC Young Fellows Zürich

FC Breitenbach win 4–1 on aggregate and remain in division. FC Young Fellows Zürich are relegated to 2. Liga.

== Further in Swiss football ==
- 1981–82 Nationalliga A
- 1981–82 Nationalliga B
- 1981–82 Swiss Cup

== Sources ==
- Switzerland 1981–82 at RSSSF

Preceded by 1980–81	Seasons in Swiss 1. Liga	Succeeded by 1982–83
