= 1982–83 Nationalliga A =

Swiss football season

Nationalliga A
- Season: 1982–83
- Champions: Grasshopper Club (19th title)
- Relegated: Bulle; Winterthur
- European Cup: Grasshopper Club
- Cup Winners' Cup: Servette
- UEFA Cup: St. Gallen; Zürich
- Top goalscorer: Jean-Paul Brigger (Servette) 23 goals

Nationalliga B
- Season: 1982–83
- Champions: La Chaux-de-Fonds
- Promoted: La Chaux-de-Fonds; Chiasso
- Relegated: Bern; Ibach; FC Rüti
- Top goalscorer: Mongi Ben Brahim (La Chaux-de-Fonds) 25 goals

Statistics of the Swiss National League in the 1982–83 football season, both Nationalliga A and Nationalliga B. This was the 86th season of top-tier and the 85th season of second-tier football in Switzerland.

== Overview ==
There were 32 member clubs in the Swiss Football Association (ASF/SFV), divided into two tiers of 16 teams each. The top tier was named Nationalliga A (NLA) and the second tier was named Nationalliga B (NLB).

The format in both divisions was that the teams played a double round-robin to decide their table positions. Each club playing every other club twice, for a total of 30 rounds. Two points were awarded for a win and one point was awarded for a draw. The Swiss champions would qualify for the 1983–84 European Cup, the runners-up and third placed team would qualify for the 1983–84 UEFA Cup. The last two placed teams in the NLA were relegated to the NLB for the following season. The top two placed teams in the NLB would be promoted to the top tier. The last three teams in the NLB were relegated to next season's 1. Liga and would be replaced by the best three teams from this season's 1. Liga.

== Nationalliga A ==
The top-tier, Nationalliga A (NLA), was contested by the top fourteen clubs from the previous season and the two sides promoted from the second level 1981–82 Nationalliga B (these being Winterthur and Wettingen). The first round was played on 14 August 1982. There was to be a winter break between 28 November and 27 February 1983. The season was completed on 11 June 1983.

=== Teams, locations ===
Locations of teams' home cities in the 1981–82 Swiss Football Championship

| Team | Town | Canton | Position in 1981–82 | Stadium | Capacity |
|---|---|---|---|---|---|
| FC Aarau | Aarau | Aargau | 7th | Stadion Brügglifeld | 9,240 |
| FC Basel | Basel | Basel-Stadt | 8th | St. Jakob Stadium | 36,800 |
| AC Bellinzona | Bellinzona | Ticino | 12th | Stadio Comunale Bellinzona | 5,000 |
| FC Bulle | Bulle | Fribourg | 14th | Stade de Bouleyres | 7,000 |
| FC Winterthur | Winterthur | Zürich | 1st in NLB | Schützenwiese | 8,550 |
| Grasshopper Club | Zürich | Zürich | Champions | Hardturm | 20,000 |
| Lausanne-Sports | Lausanne | Vaud | 13th | Pontaise | 15,700 |
| FC Luzern | Lucerne | Lucerne | 9th | Stadion Allmend | 25,000 |
| Neuchâtel Xamax | Neuchâtel | Neuchâtel | 4th | Stade de la Maladière | 25,500 |
| FC Wettingen | Wettingen | Aargau | 2nd in NLB | Stadion Altenburg | 10,000 |
| FC St. Gallen | St. Gallen | St. Gallen | 10th | Espenmoos | 11,000 |
| Servette | Geneva | Geneva | 2nd | Stade des Charmilles | 27,000 |
| FC Sion | Sion | Valais | 6th | Stade de Tourbillon | 16,000 |
| Vevey-Sports | Vevey | Vaud | 11th | Stade de Copet | 4,000 |
| Young Boys | Bern | Bern | 5th | Wankdorf Stadium | 56,000 |
| FC Zürich | Zürich | Zürich | 3rd | Letzigrund | 25,000 |

=== Final league table ===
| Pos | Team | Pld | W | D | L | GF | GA | GD | Pts | Qualification |
|---|---|---|---|---|---|---|---|---|---|---|
| 1 | Grasshopper Club | 30 | 24 | 1 | 5 | 86 | 29 | +57 | 49 | Swiss champions, qualified for 1983–84 European Cup |
| 2 | Servette | 30 | 22 | 4 | 4 | 65 | 24 | +41 | 48 | Swiss Cup finalist, qualified for 1983–84 Cup Winners' Cup |
| 3 | St. Gallen | 30 | 17 | 6 | 7 | 61 | 31 | +30 | 40 | qualified for 1983–84 UEFA Cup and entered 1983 Intertoto Cup |
| 4 | Zürich | 30 | 17 | 4 | 9 | 55 | 39 | +16 | 38 | qualified for 1983–84 UEFA Cup and entered 1983 Intertoto Cup |
| 5 | Lausanne-Sport | 30 | 15 | 7 | 8 | 51 | 28 | +23 | 37 | |
| 6 | Xamax | 30 | 15 | 7 | 8 | 61 | 40 | +21 | 37 | |
| 7 | Sion | 30 | 12 | 11 | 7 | 51 | 36 | +15 | 35 | |
| 8 | Luzern | 30 | 14 | 3 | 13 | 57 | 56 | +1 | 31 | entered 1983 Intertoto Cup |
| 9 | Young Boys | 30 | 11 | 8 | 11 | 35 | 42 | −7 | 30 | entered 1983 Intertoto Cup |
| 10 | Wettingen | 30 | 8 | 9 | 13 | 40 | 47 | −7 | 25 | |
| 11 | Basel | 30 | 10 | 5 | 15 | 47 | 56 | −9 | 25 | |
| 12 | Vevey | 30 | 9 | 4 | 17 | 42 | 61 | −19 | 22 | |
| 13 | AC Bellinzona | 30 | 8 | 5 | 17 | 36 | 74 | −38 | 21 | |
| 14 | Aarau | 30 | 8 | 4 | 18 | 32 | 52 | −20 | 20 | |
| 15 | Bulle | 30 | 4 | 4 | 22 | 27 | 87 | −60 | 12 | Relegated to 1983–84 Nationalliga B |
| 16 | Winterthur | 30 | 2 | 6 | 22 | 30 | 74 | −44 | 10 | Relegated to 1983–84 Nationalliga B |

Source: rsssf.com
Rules for classification: 1) Points; 2) Goal difference within the league, but decider play-off for qualifiers;

=== Results ===
| Home \ Away | AAR | BAS | BEL | BUL | GCZ | NX | LS | LUZ | SER | SIO | STG | VEV | WET | WIN | YB | ZÜR |
|---|---|---|---|---|---|---|---|---|---|---|---|---|---|---|---|---|
| Aarau | | 1–2 | 0–0 | 4–0 | 0–2 | 1–5 | 2–0 | 1–2 | 0–3 | 1–5 | 2–1 | 2–0 | 1–3 | 3–0 | 2–0 | 0–1 |
| Basel | 2–1 | | 2–3 | 3–1 | 3–1 | 0–4 | 1–0 | 3–0 | 1–3 | 2–2 | 2–2 | 5–1 | 1–0 | 1–0 | 0–1 | 1–1 |
| Bellinzona | 1–0 | 0–3 | | 4–0 | 0–2 | 1–1 | 2–2 | 3–1 | 1–4 | 2–2 | 0–4 | 0–1 | 1–0 | 1–0 | 1–3 | 1–0 |
| Bulle | 0–0 | 2–1 | 4–1 | | 0–1 | 0–2 | 0–2 | 2–1 | 1–1 | 0–2 | 0–5 | 1–5 | 1–1 | 1–0 | 1–3 | 0–2 |
| Grasshopper | 7–0 | 1–0 | 6–0 | 6–2 | | 4–1 | 3–0 | 5–1 | 2–1 | 3–0 | 1–0 | 6–0 | 3–1 | 6–1 | 4–0 | 2–1 |
| Neuchâtel Xamax | 4–1 | 3–2 | 4–2 | 4–1 | 2–1 | | 2–0 | 4–1 | 1–1 | 1–2 | 2–0 | 0–2 | 1–1 | 2–1 | 2–2 | 1–0 |
| Lausanne-Sports | 3–0 | 7–0 | 1–1 | 4–2 | 2–0 | 1–0 | | 4–0 | 1–1 | 4–0 | 2–2 | 2–0 | 2–0 | 3–0 | 1–0 | 2–0 |
| Luzern | 2–1 | 4–3 | 4–0 | 8–0 | 2–3 | 5–2 | 2–0 | | 1–2 | 1–1 | 2–1 | 3–1 | 2–0 | 4–1 | 0–1 | 0–2 |
| Servette | 1–0 | 2–0 | 4–1 | 2–0 | 2–1 | 2–1 | 1–0 | 3–0 | | 1–0 | 3–1 | 2–0 | 5–1 | 5–1 | 3–0 | 2–3 |
| Sion | 1–0 | 1–0 | 6–1 | 4–2 | 0–0 | 1–2 | 1–1 | 0–0 | 1–1 | | 1–1 | 3–1 | 6–2 | 3–1 | 1–0 | 0–1 |
| St. Gallen | 2–0 | 2–0 | 2–1 | 5–1 | 5–1 | 1–0 | 0–0 | 4–1 | 4–1 | 1–1 | | 4–3 | 2–1 | 2–1 | 0–1 | 1–0 |
| Vevey-Sports | 2–4 | 3–3 | 1–2 | 6–1 | 0–1 | 0–4 | 3–2 | 0–2 | 0–1 | 1–1 | 2–1 | | 0–2 | 3–0 | 1–1 | 0–1 |
| Wettingen | 0–0 | 1–0 | 4–1 | 4–0 | 0–3 | 1–1 | 4–1 | 2–2 | 0–1 | 1–1 | 1–1 | 2–3 | | 3–2 | 0–0 | 3–1 |
| Winterthur | 0–3 | 1–1 | 7–5 | 1–1 | 1–5 | 2–2 | 0–1 | 2–4 | 0–2 | 1–2 | 1–2 | 0–1 | 1–1 | | 3–1 | 2–2 |
| Young Boys | 1–0 | 4–2 | 2–0 | 3–2 | 2–3 | 1–1 | 1–1 | 0–1 | 0–4 | 3–2 | 0–1 | 1–1 | 2–1 | 0–0 | | 2–2 |
| Zürich | 2–2 | 4–3 | 4–0 | 2–1 | 2–3 | 3–2 | 0–2 | 5–1 | 2–1 | 2–1 | 0–4 | 4–1 | 2–0 | 4–1 | 2–0 | |

Source: rsssf.com
Legend: Blue = home team win; Yellow = draw; Red = away team win.

== Nationalliga B ==
The Nationalliga B (NLB) was contested by the clubs in third to thirteenth position last season, further by the two clubs relegated from the top-tier last season (Nordstern Basel and Chiasso) and by the three clubs that had been promoted from the 1981–82 1. Liga at the end of the previous season (these being FC Rüti, FC Baden and Laufen. The first round was played on 14 August 1982. There was to be a winter break between 28 November and 27 February 1983. The season was completed on 11 June 1983.

=== Teams, locations ===
| Team | Town | Canton | Stadium | Capacity |
|---|---|---|---|---|
| FC Baden | Baden | Aargau | Esp Stadium | 7,000 |
| FC Bern | Bern | Bern | Stadion Neufeld | 14,000 |
| FC Biel-Bienne | Biel/Bienne | Bern | Stadion Gurzelen | 15,000 |
| CS Chênois | Thônex | Geneva | Stade des Trois-Chêne | 8,000 |
| FC Chiasso | Chiasso | Ticino | Stadio Comunale Riva IV | 4,000 |
| FC Fribourg | Fribourg | Fribourg | Stade Universitaire | 9,000 |
| FC Grenchen | Grenchen | Solothurn | Stadium Brühl | 15,100 |
| FC Ibach | Ibach | Schwyz | Gerbihof | 3,300 |
| FC La Chaux-de-Fonds | La Chaux-de-Fonds | Neuchâtel | Centre Sportif de la Charrière | 12,700 |
| FC Laufen | Laufen | Basel-Landschaft | Sportplatz Nau | 3,000 |
| FC Locarno | Locarno | Ticino | Stadio comunale Lido | 5,000 |
| Lugano | Lugano | Ticino | Cornaredo Stadium | 6,330 |
| Mendrisiostar | Mendrisio | Ticino | Centro Sportivo Comunale | 4,000 |
| FC Monthey | Monthey | Valais | Stade Philippe Pottier | 1,800 |
| FC Nordstern Basel | Basel | Basel-Stadt | Rankhof | 7,600 |
| FC Rüti | Rüti | Zürich | Schützenwiese | 1,200 |

=== Final league table ===
| Pos | Team | Pld | W | D | L | GF | GA | GD | Pts | Qualification |
|---|---|---|---|---|---|---|---|---|---|---|
| 1 | FC La Chaux-de-Fonds | 30 | 22 | 4 | 4 | 76 | 20 | +56 | 48 | Promotion to 1983–84 Nationalliga A |
| 2 | FC Chiasso | 30 | 18 | 7 | 5 | 62 | 35 | +27 | 43 | Promotion to 1983–84 Nationalliga A |
| 3 | CS Chênois | 30 | 17 | 6 | 7 | 62 | 39 | +23 | 40 | |
| 4 | Lugano | 30 | 15 | 6 | 9 | 65 | 49 | +16 | 36 | |
| 5 | FC Biel-Bienne | 30 | 16 | 4 | 10 | 64 | 51 | +13 | 36 | |
| 6 | FC Nordstern Basel | 30 | 11 | 13 | 6 | 55 | 43 | +12 | 35 | |
| 7 | FC Fribourg | 30 | 12 | 10 | 8 | 56 | 43 | +13 | 34 | |
| 8 | FC Monthey | 30 | 12 | 7 | 11 | 63 | 51 | +12 | 31 | |
| 9 | FC Laufen | 30 | 11 | 9 | 10 | 43 | 49 | −6 | 31 | |
| 10 | FC Grenchen | 30 | 9 | 10 | 11 | 35 | 43 | −8 | 28 | |
| 11 | Mendrisiostar | 30 | 9 | 10 | 11 | 40 | 50 | −10 | 28 | |
| 12 | FC Baden | 30 | 9 | 9 | 12 | 35 | 48 | −13 | 27 | |
| 13 | FC Locarno | 30 | 8 | 8 | 14 | 40 | 57 | −17 | 24 | |
| 14 | FC Bern | 30 | 9 | 3 | 18 | 45 | 63 | −18 | 21 | Relegation to 1983–84 Swiss 1. Liga |
| 15 | FC Ibach | 30 | 4 | 5 | 21 | 29 | 75 | −46 | 13 | Relegation to 1983–84 Swiss 1. Liga |
| 16 | FC Rüti | 30 | 1 | 3 | 26 | 31 | 85 | −54 | 5 | Relegation to 1983–84 Swiss 1. Liga |

Source: rsssf
Rules for classification: 1) Points; 2) Goal difference within the league, but decider play-off for qualifiers;

== Further in Swiss football ==
- 1982–83 Swiss Cup
- 1982–83 Swiss 1. Liga

== Sources ==
- Switzerland 1982–83 at RSSSF

| Preceded by 1981–82 | Nationalliga seasons in Switzerland | Succeeded by 1983–84 |
