= Gianfranco Seramondi =

Swiss footballer (born 1958)

Personal information
- Date of birth: 9 August 1958 (age 68)
- Place of birth: Geneva, Switzerland
- Height: 1.80 m (5 ft 11 in)
- Position: Defender

Senior career*
Years	Team	Apps	(Gls)
1978–1983	Servette		
1983–1988	FC Lausanne-Sport		
1988–1991	CS Chênois		
- * Club domestic league appearances and goals

Gianfranco Seramondi (born 9 August 1958) is a retired Swiss footballer who played as a defender.
