= Stade de Bouleyres =

Multi-use stadium

Coordinates: 46.6162°N 7.0666°E

- Interactive map of Stade de Bouleyres
- Address: Chemin de Bouleyres 83
- Location: Bulle; Switzerland
- Capacity: 5000; 650 (seated)
- Surface: Grass

Construction
- Built: 1949

Tenant
- FC Bulle

Stade de Bouleyres is a multi-use stadium in Bulle, Switzerland. It is currently used mostly for football matches and is the home ground of FC Bulle. The stadium holds 5,000 people.
