= Vevey-Sports =

Swiss football club

- Full name: Vevey-Sports
- Founded: 1898; 128 years ago as Vevey Sports; 2005; 21 years ago as FC Vevey Sports 05; 27 April 2018; 8 years ago as FC Vevey United; 14 September 2021; 5 years ago as Vevey-Sports
- Ground: Stade de Copet, Vevey, Switzerland
- Capacity: 5,000
- Chairman: William von Stockalper
- Manager: Jean-Philippe Lebeau
- League: 1. Liga Classic
- 2025-26: 18th of 18 (Relegated)
- Website: veveysports.ch
Home colours	Away colours

Vevey-Sports, formerly FC Vevey United, is a Swiss football club based in Vevey, Vaud canton. The club currently play in Promotion League, the third tier of Swiss football.

== History ==
=== Vevey Sports ===
The club was founded in 1905 as Vevey Sports. They had 7 seasons in the Swiss Super League: 1974–75, 1981–82, 1982–83, 1983–84, 1984–85, 1985–86 and 1986–87. They lost a promotion-relegation playoff against FC Lugano in 1987. They were relegated again, to the third tier of Swiss football, in 1988.

=== FC Vevey Sports 05 ===
In 2005 the club was declared bankrupt and dissolved, then refounded as FC Vevey Sports 05.

=== FC Vevey United ===
On 27 April 2018, the club was merged with Azzurri Riviera and renamed FC Vevey United.

As of 2019, Vevey play in 1. Liga Classic, the 4th tier of Swiss football league system.

=== Vevey-Sports ===
In 2021, the club takes the name Vevey-Sports. The name is validated during the general meeting on 14 September 2021.

In 2023–24, Vevey-Sports secure promotion to Swiss Promotion League for the first time in history from 2024–25 season after defeat FC Schötz 2-1 aggregate 4-3 in play-off matches.

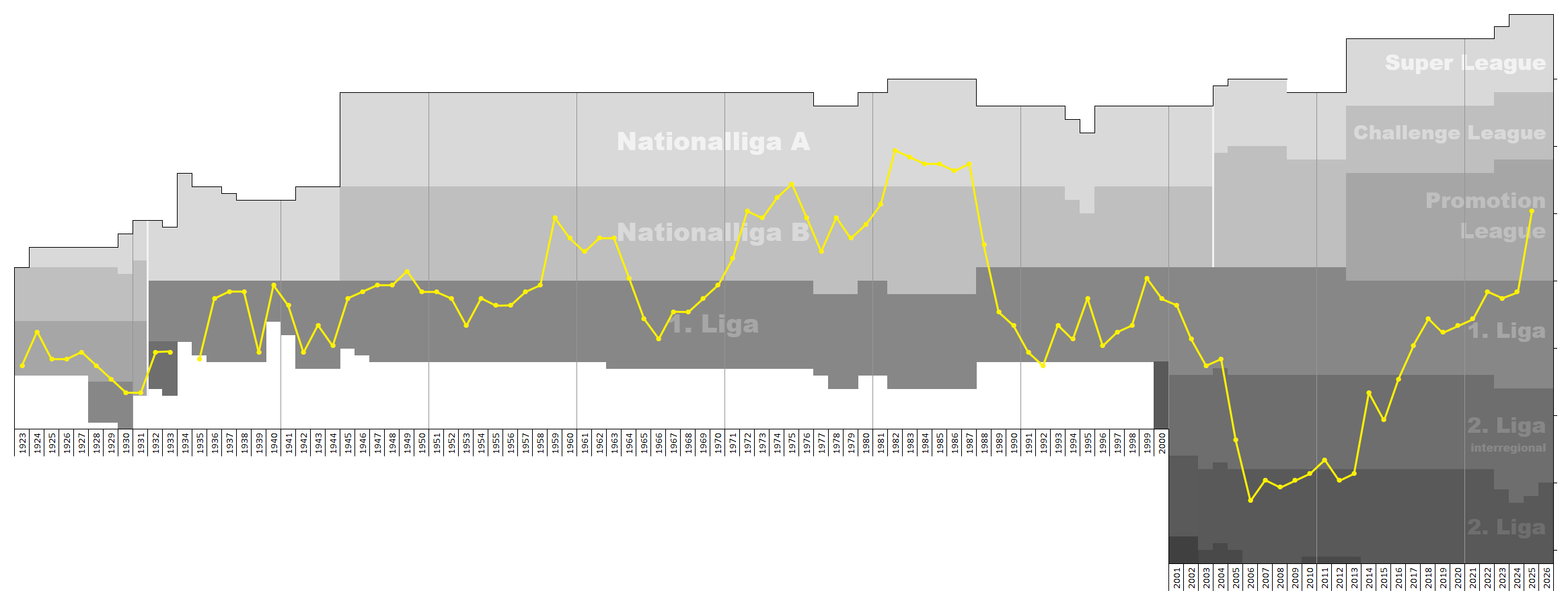
Chart of FC Vevey-Sports table positions in the Swiss football league system

== Former managers ==
- (Socialist Federal Republic of Yugoslavia) Miroslav Blažević (1968–1971)
- (Switzerland) Peter Rösch (1971–1972)
- (France) Antoine Cuissard (1972–October 1974)
- (Czech Republic) Georges Hanke (1974–1976)
- (Switzerland) Paul Garbani (1978–1985)
- (Switzerland) Gérard Castella (1985–1986)
- (Switzerland) Guy Mathez (1986–1987)
- (Germany) Alfons Edenhofer (1987–1988)
- (Romania) Adrian Ursea (2000–2001)
- (France) Didier Tholot (2002–2003)
- (Poland) (Switzerland) Hugo Raczynski (2013-2015)
- (France) (Switzerland) Hervé Bochud (2015–April 2017)
- (Switzerland) Julien Schürmann (April 2017–June 2017)
- (Switzerland) Jean-Philippe Karlen (2017–2019)
- (France) Christophe Caschili (2019–2022)
- (France) Amar Boumilat (2022–2023)
- (France) Jean-Philippe Lebeau (2024–present)

== Current squad ==
As of 1 October 2026. Note: Flags indicate national team as defined under FIFA eligibility rules; some limited exceptions apply. Players may hold more than one non-FIFA nationality.

No.	Pos.	Nation	Player
1	GK	SUI	Premtim Gashi
4	DF	SUI	Edon Jusufi
5	MF	SUI	Artijan Pangja
6	MF	ITA	Hermann Daha
8	MF	SUI	Fabio Pirona
9	FW	FRA	Jean-Liroye Kouadio
10	MF	SUI	Elmedin Avdic
11	FW	TUR	Emre Karadagli
12	DF	SUI	Diego Colucci
13	MF	ANG	Ricos Nsimgi
14	MF	SUI	Jasin Djemaili

No.	Pos.	Nation	Player
17	FW	FRA	Abdoulaye Camara
18	DF	SUI	Sam Burgazzoli
20	GK	SUI	Ozan Sahingöz
21	FW	SUI	Guirane Forestier
22	DF	SUI	Arbias Morina
23	MF	SUI	Mahé Guaico
24	MF	SUI	Marwane Saghrouni
25	FW	TUR	Tarik Karadağlı
26	MF	CIV	Anin Ohouochi
45	DF	TTO	Diego Nanton
62	DF	SUI	Dany Mejbri
99	GK	ITA	Luca Cangiano
