= Stadion Gersag =

Coordinates: 47°04′47″N 8°17′01″E

Gersag
- Interactive map of Gersag
- Location: Emmenbrücke, Luzern
- Owner: FC Emmenbrücke
- Capacity: 8,700
- Surface: Grass
- Field size: 100 x 64m

Construction
- Built: 1960
- Renovated: 2009

Tenant
- FC Luzern

Stadion Gersag is a stadium in Emmenbrücke, Luzern, Switzerland. It is currently used for football matches and is the home ground of FC Emmenbrücke.

From 2009 to 2011 it served as the temporary stadium of FC Luzern whilst their home stadium, the Swissporarena, was being built. During this time, the stadium had 3,195 covered seats and 4,785 standing places with most of them being temporary.

FC Luzern supporters enjoyed their time in the stadium, even naming it as the 5th best thing about supporting the club and have made a scarf as a tribute to their time there.

There was talk of Grasshopper Club Zürich moving into the Gersag stadium as they sought a home for the 2011-12 season.
