= FC Bulle =

- Full name: Football Club Bulle
- Founded: 1910; 116 years ago
- Ground: Stade de Bouleyres; Bulle, Switzerland
- Capacity: 5,000
- Chairman: Jorge de Figueiredo
- Manager: (France) Steve Guillod
- League: Promotion League
- 2024–25: 10th of 18
- Website: https://www.fcbulle.ch/
Home colours	Away colours

FC Bulle is a Swiss football club, based in Bulle. Their home ground is the Stade de Bouleyres. They currently play in Promotion League, the third tier of Swiss football.

== History ==
Founded in 1910, they last played in the Swiss top tier in 1992–93. That was ten years after their previous spell at the highest level.

== Current squad ==
As of 20 September 2026

Note: Flags indicate national team as defined under FIFA eligibility rules; some limited exceptions apply. Players may hold more than one non-FIFA nationality.

No.	Pos.	Nation	Player
2	DF	SUI	Matéo Jungo
4	DF	SUI	Thoma Monney
7	FW	FRA	Exaucé Mafoumbi (on loan from Stade Lausanne Ouchy)
8	MF	SUI	Jashar Dema
9	FW	SUI	Andi Ukmata
11	FW	MAD	Rinjala Raherinaivo
13	DF	MAD	Tony Robert
17	MF	SUI	Kevin Malula
19	FW	SUI	Esteban Petignat
20	MF	ITA	Luca Gelato (on loan from Stade Lausanne Ouchy)
25	DF	KOS	Egzon Rexhaj
27	MF	SUI	Elisio Antunes

No.	Pos.	Nation	Player
45	MF	SUI	Samuel Kasongo
47	MF	SUI	Liburn Azemi
53	MF	SUI	Ilan Reina
63	GK	SUI	Ardit Meha
66	MF	ANG	Hervé Matondo
70	FW	SUI	Valentin Nushi
77	FW	SUI	Mathis Giordano
80	MF	FRA	Joris Correa
88	DF	SUI	Seydina Doumbia
99	GK	SUI	Leandro Zbinden
-	FW	ALG	Allan Khiari

=== Out on loan ===
Note: Flags indicate national team as defined under FIFA eligibility rules; some limited exceptions apply. Players may hold more than one non-FIFA nationality.

No. / Pos. / Nation / Player; 15 / DF / SUI / Sacha Tavares (at FC Portalban/Gletterens until 30 June 2027)	No. / Pos. / Nation / Player; 30 / GK / SUI / Benjamin Debons (at CS Romontois until 30 June 2027)

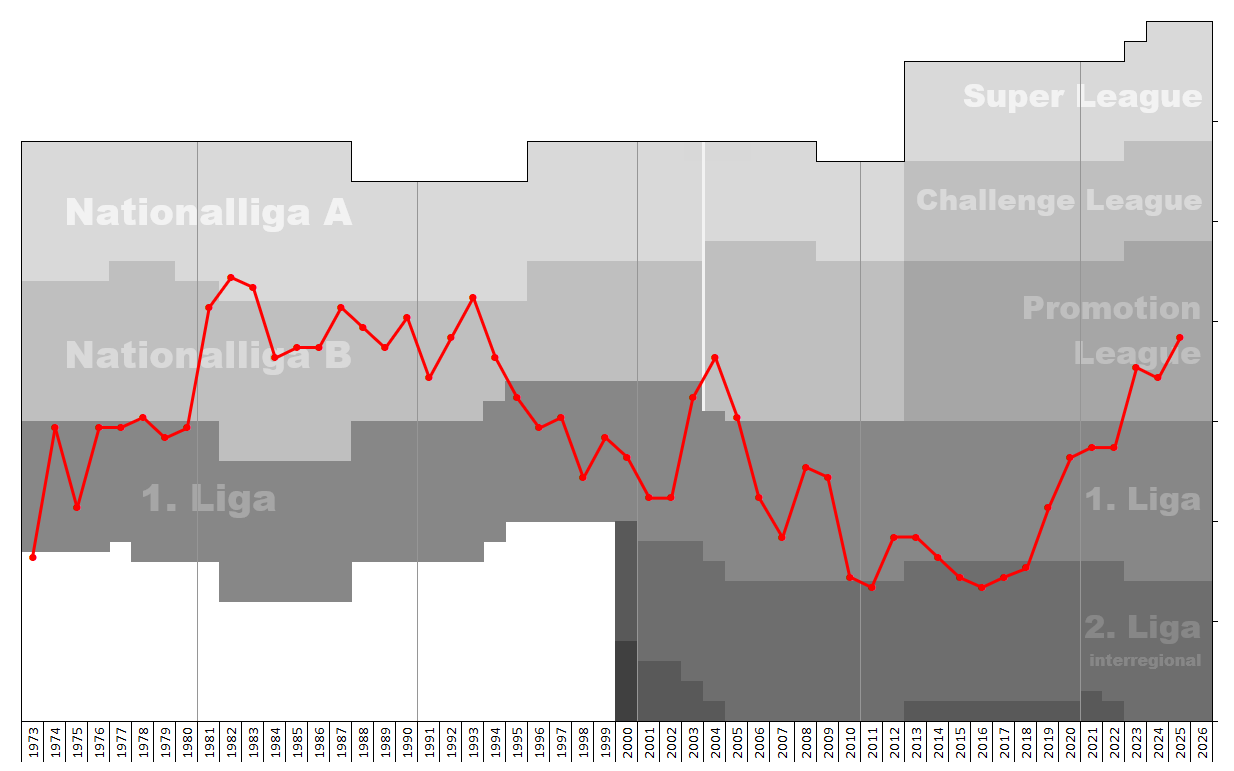
Chart of FC Bulle table positions in the Swiss football league system
