= 1974–75 FC Zürich season =

Associan football season

FC Zürich
1974–75 season
- Owner: Edwin Nägeli
- Chairman: Edwin Nägeli
- Head coach: Friedhelm Konietzka
- Stadium: Letzigrund
- Nationalliga A: Champions
- Swiss Cup: Round 5
- 1974–75 Swiss League Cup: Finalist
- 1974–75 European Cup: Round 1
- 1974 Intertoto Cup: Group 1 winners
- Top goalscorer: League: Ilija Katić (23); All: Ilija Katić (30)

The 1974–75 season was FC Zürich's 78th season in their existence, since their foundation in 1896. It was their 16th consecutive season in the top flight of Swiss football, following their promotion at the end of the 1957–58 season. They played their home games in the Letzigrund.

== Overview ==
The club's president at this time was Edwin Nägeli, who had held this position since 1957. The FCZ first team head-coach for the fourth consecutive season was the German Friedhelm Konietzka. The first team competed not only in the first-tier Nationalliga, but also competed in 1974–75 Swiss Cup and in the 1974–75 Swiss League Cup. Further the team entered into the 1974 Intertoto Cup and they had qualified for the 1974–75 European Cup by becoming champions at the end of the 1973–74 Nationalliga A season.

== Players ==
The following is the list of the FCZ first team squad this season. It also includes players that were in the squad the day the season started on 17 August 1974, but subsequently left the club after that date.

Note: Flags indicate national team as defined under FIFA eligibility rules; some limited exceptions apply. Players may hold more than one non-FIFA nationality.

No.	Pos.	Nation	Player
1	GK	SUI	Karl Grob (league games: 26)
—	GK	SUI	Ruedi Hauser (league games: 0)
—	GK	SUI	Erhard Wyss (league games: 0)
—	GK	SUI	Hanspeter Janser (league games: 1)
—	DF	SUI	Max Heer (league games: 26)
—	DF	SUI	Hilmar Zigerlig (league games: 25)
—	DF	SUI	Renzo Bionda (league games: 26)
—	DF	SUI	Pirmin Stierli (league games: 25)
—	DF	SUI	Giuseppe Sanfilippo (league games: 1)
—	MF	SUI	Silvio Hartmann (league games: 1)
—	MF	SUI	Rosario Martinelli (league games: 26)

No.	Pos.	Nation	Player
—	MF	SUI	Ernst Rutschmann (league games: 26)
—	MF	SUI	Jakob Kuhn (league games: 24)
—	MF	SUI	René Botteron (league games: 26)
—	MF	SUI	Walter Iselin (league games: 16)
—	MF	SUI	Heinz Ernst (league games: 0)
—	MF	SUI	Alfred Strasser (league games: 1)
—	FW	SUI	Erwin Schweizer (league games: 1)
—	FW	SUI	Peter Marti (league games: 4)
—	FW	SUI	Ilija Katić (league games: 26)
—	FW	SUI	Daniel Jeandupeux (league games: 25)
—	FW	SUI	Pius Senn (league games: 6)
—	FW	GER	Friedhelm Konietzka

Players who left the squad

Note: Flags indicate national team as defined under FIFA eligibility rules; some limited exceptions apply. Players may hold more than one non-FIFA nationality.

No. / Pos. / Nation / Player; — / DF / GER / Hubert Münch (to Winterthur)	No. / Pos. / Nation / Player; — / FW / SUI / René Rietmann (to Neuchâtel Xamax)

== Results ==
Legend

Win Draw Loss Postponed

=== Nationalliga ===
==== League matches ====
17 August 1974 Round 1	Zürich	5–1	Luzern	Letzigrund, Zürich
	Katić 39' (1:1); Rutschmann 56' (2:1); Rutschmann 58' (pen.); Heer 70' (4:1); Botteron 83' (5:1)	FCZ summary	16' (0:1) Küttel; (yellow card) 35' Schaller; (yellow card) 50' Good	Attendance: 6,000; Referee: (Switzerland) René Matthieu (Sierre)

24 August 1974 Round 2	Servette	0–3	Zürich	Charmilles Stadium, Geneva
	Sundermann (yellow card) 8'	FCZ summary	(yellow card) 3' Botteron; (yellow card) 36' Katić; 56' (0:1) Martinelli; (yellow card) 63' Heer; 64' (0:2) Kuhn; 82' (0:2) Katić	Attendance: 9,700; Referee: (Switzerland) Anton Bucheli (Luzern)

31 August 1974 Round 3	Lugano	P–P	Zürich	Cornaredo, Lugano
		[ FCZ summary]
Note: On 31 August the match in Lugano could not be played due to water logged pitch.

7 September 1974 Round 4	Zürich	4–1	Young Boys	Letzigrund, Zürich
20:00	Martinelli 14' (1:0); Kuhn 25' (pen.); Jeandupeux 60' (3:1); Jeandupeux 75' (pen.)	FCZ summary	30' (og 2:1) (Marti)	Attendance: 6,200; Referee: (Switzerland) Walter Hungerbühler (St. Gallen)

11 September 1974 Round 5	Sion	1–0	Zürich	Stade Tourbillon, Sion
20:15	Quentin 75' (1:0); Pillet (yellow card) 85'	FCZ summary	(yellow card) 75' Jeandupeux	Attendance: 9,000; Referee: (Switzerland) Bruno della Bruna (Lumino)

14 September 1974 Round 6	Vevey-Sports	0–4	Zürich	Stade de Copet, Vevey
20:15	Tippelt (penalty missed) 45′	FCZ summary	20' (0:1) Katić; 29' (0:2) Jeandupeux; 49' (0:3) Martinelli; 66' (0:4) Katić; (yellow card) 76' Stierli; (yellow card) 87' Botteron	Attendance: 5,000; Referee: (Switzerland) Jean Dubach (Nidau)

28 September 1974 Round 7	Zürich	5–0	St. Gallen	Letzigrund, Zürich
20:15	Katić 43' (1:0); Katić 55' (2:0); Martinelli 67' (3:0); Bionda 70' (4:0); Jeandupeux 72' (5:0)	FCZ summary		Attendance: 3,600; Referee: (Switzerland) Ernst Dörflinger (Grenchen and Basel)
Note: Rain throughout the entire game.

5 October 1974 Round 8	Basel	1–0	Zürich	St. Jakob Stadium, Basel
20:00	Odermatt (yellow card) 19'; Hitzfeld (yellow card) 30'; Hitzfeld 90+1' (pen. 1:0)	FCZ summary FCB summary	(yellow card) 20' Zigerlig; (yellow card) 89' Botteron	Attendance: 18,000; Referee: (Switzerland) André Favre Echallens
Note: In the 86th minute Bottles were thrown after a goal by Eigil Nielsen was disallowed for offside. FCZ lodged an official (and hopeless) protest.

12 October 1974 Round 9	Zürich	5–0	Chênois	Letzigrund, Zürich
17:00	Martinelli 4' (1:0); Bionda 25' (2:0); Heer 42' (3:0); Katić 75' (4:0); Jeandupeux 85' (pen.); Martinelli (yellow card)	FCZ summary	(yellow card) 42' Yaghcha	Attendance: 3,500; Referee: (Switzerland) Roland Racine (Prilly)
Note: Corners: 17:0

20 October 1974 Round 10	Grasshopper Club	1–3	Zürich	Hardturm, Zürich
14:45	H. Niggl 44' (1:1); Staudenmann (yellow card) 51'; H. Niggl (yellow card) 58'	FCZ summary	22' (0:1) Kuhn; 62' (1:2) Botteron; 65' (1:3) Katić	Attendance: 12,000; Referee: (Switzerland) Jean Dubach (Nidau)
Note: Light rain in the first half, pitch deep and sticky.

27 October 1974 Round 11	Zürich	3–0	Xamax	Letzigrund, Zürich
14:30	Martinelli 34' (1:0); Jeandupeux 59' (2:0); Rutschmann 77' (3:0); Jeandupeux (penalty missed) 85′	FCZ summary		Attendance: 7,000; Referee: (Switzerland) Walter Hungerbühler (St. Gallen)

3 November 1974 Round 3	Lugano	3–1	Zürich	Cornaredo, Lugano
14:45	Zappa 5' (1:0); Brenna 33' (2:1); Elia 45' (3:1); Beyeler (yellow card) 69'	FCZ summary	19' (1:1) Kuhn; (yellow card) 39' Heer	Attendance: 5,000; Referee: (Switzerland) André Favre (Échallens)
Note: Rescheduled match from the 3rd round. Ideal conditions, sunny.

10 November 1974 Round 12	Lausanne-Sport	0–1	Zürich	Olympique de la Pontaise, Lausanne
14:30		FCZ summary	52' (0:1) Katić; (yellow card) 82' Zigerlig	Attendance: 8,000; Referee: (Switzerland) Ernst Dörflinger (Grenchen and Basel)
Note: Rain before and during the entire game. The ground was playable, but somewhat slippery.

17 November1974 Round 13	Zürich	2–0	Winterthur	Letzigrund, Zürich
14:30	Rutschmann (yellow card) 39'; Katić 70' (1:0); Katić 72' (2:0)	FCZ summary	(yellow card) 64' Bollmann; (yellow card) 69' Grünig	Attendance: 15,500; Referee: (Switzerland) Ruedi Renggli (Stans)
Note: Corners 7:5

16 March 1975 Round 14	Luzern	0–2	Zürich	Stadion Allmend, Luzern
14:30		FCZ summary	26' (0:1) Katić; 45' (0:2) Katić	Attendance: 7,000; Referee: (Switzerland) Roland Racine (Prilly)
Note: Cool weather, slightly slippery pitch and rain during the game. Corners 4:5

23 March 1974 Round 15	Zürich	3–0	Servette	Letzigrund, Zürich
15:00	Katić 51' (1:0); Katić 52' (2:0); Heer (yellow card) 58'; Jeandupeux 73' (3:0)	FCZ summary	(yellow card) 81' Guyot	Attendance: 8,500; Referee: (Switzerland) André Favre (Échallens)
Note: Amazingly good conditioned pitch.

5 April 1975 Round 16	Zürich	P–P	Lugano	Letzigrund, Zürich
		[ FCZ summary]

12 April 1974 Round 17	Young Boys	2–2	Zürich	Wankdorf Stadium, Bern
17:30	Rebmann (yellow card) 52'; Cornioley (yellow card) 58'; Leuzinger 76' (1:1); Schild 80' (2:1)	FCZ summary	28' (0:1) Katić; 90+1' (2:2) Katić	Attendance: 13,000; Referee: (Switzerland) Ulysse Darbellay (Roche, Vaud)

16 April 1974 Round 18	Zürich	1–0	Sion	Letzigrund, Zürich
20:00	Kuhn (yellow card) 44'; Rutschmann 70' (1:0)	FCZ summary	(yellow card) 90' Barberis	Attendance: 9,000; Referee: (Switzerland) Roland Racine (Prilly)
Note: Deep, slippery ground after heavy rainfall throughout the day.

19 April 1974 Round 19	Zürich	3–0	Vevey-Sports	Letzigrund, Zürich
17:00	Jeandupeux 21' (1:0); Katić 30' (2:0); Jeandupeux 57' (3:0)	FCZ summary	(yellow card) 27' García; (yellow card) 27' Osojnak; (yellow card) 39' Mayer; (yellow card) 43' Durussel; (yellow card) 61' Tippelt	Attendance: 5,500; Referee: (Switzerland) Kurt Fuchs (Basel)
Note: Almost summery warmth, good conditioned pitch. Corners 10:3

26 April 1974 Round 20	St. Gallen	1–5	Zürich	Espenmoos, St. Gallen
17:30	Brander (yellow card) 20'; Blättler 79' (1:5)	FCZ summary	29' (0:1) Martinelli; 52' (0:2) Kuhn; 55' (0:3) Jeandupeux; 57' (0:4) Katić; 59' (0:5) Katić; (penalty missed) 89′ Katić	Attendance: 8,000; Referee: (Switzerland) Pierre Despont (Lausanne)

3 May 1975 Round 21	Zürich	1–2	Basel	Letzigrund, Zürich
17:00	Martinelli 62' (1:1); Rutschmann (penalty missed) 90′	FCZ summary FCB summary	(yellow card) 24' Nielsen; 47' (0:1) Mundschin; 70' (1:2) Ramseier	Attendance: 10,000; Referee: (Switzerland) Bruno Della Bruna (Lumino)
Note: Corners 12:5

16 May 1974 Round 22	Chênois	2–1	Zürich	Stade des Trois-Chêne, Thônex
20:15	Mocellin 65' (1:1); Mabillard 74' (2:1); Yaghcha (yellow card) 81'; Dumont (yellow card) 85'	FCZ summary	12' (0:1) Kuhn; (yellow card) 62' Zigerlig; (yellow card) 80' Heer	Attendance: 3,500; Referee: (Switzerland) Ruedi Renggli (Stans)
Note: Corners 4:11

24 May 1974 Round 23	Zürich	4–0	Grasshopper Club	Letzigrund, Zürich
17:00	Rutschmann (yellow card) 25'; Katić 33' (1:0); Martinelli 44' (2:0); Martinelli 53' (2:0); Martinelli 71' (4:0)	FCZ summary	(yellow card) 20' Becker	Attendance: 24,000; Referee: (Switzerland) Jean Dubach (Nidau)

27 May 1974 Round 16	Zürich	1–0	Lugano	Letzigrund, Zürich
20:00	Katić 6' (1:0)	FCZ summary	(yellow card) 26' Conigliaro; (yellow card) 80' Bressan	Attendance: 7,500; Referee: (Switzerland) André Favre (Échallens)
Note: Rescheduled match from 5 April. Cool evening, dry pitch.

31 May 1974 Round 24	Xamax	4–1	Zürich	Stade de la Maladière (1924), Neuchâtel
18:15	Guillaume 3' (1:0); Decastel 35' (2:0); Elsig 46' (pen.); Mathez 48' (4:0)	FCZ summary	(yellow card) 37' Grob; (yellow card) 38' Zigerlig; 50' (4:1) Jeandupeux	Attendance: 3,900; Referee: (Switzerland) A. Häring (Düdingen)
Note: Despite the defeat, FCZ is confirmed as Swiss champions 1974/75 after the game, as YB won against GC.

7 June 1974 Round 25	Zürich	2–0	Lausanne-Sport	Letzigrund, Zürich
17:00	Katić 78' (1:0); Botteron 87' (2:0)	FCZ summary		Attendance: 6,500; Referee: (Switzerland) Ernst Dörflinger (Grenchen and Basel)
Note: After the game, the trophy was presented by Lucien Schmidlin.

14 June 1974 Round 26	Winterthur	0–1	Zürich	Schützenwiese, Winterthur
20:15		FCZ summary	58' (0:1) Kuhn	Attendance: 3,600; Referee: (Switzerland) Peter Scherz (Aegerten)

==== Final league table ====
Pos	Team	Pld	W	D	L	GF	GA	GD	Pts	Qualification
1	Zürich	26	19	1	6	63	19	+44	39	Swiss Champions, qualified for 1975–76 European Cup and entered 1975 Intertoto Cup
2	Young Boys	26	12	9	5	59	32	+27	33	Qualified for 1975–76 UEFA Cup and entered 1975 Intertoto Cup
3	Grasshopper Club	26	13	7	6	50	45	+5	33	Qualified for 1975–76 UEFA Cup and entered 1975 Intertoto Cup
4	Basel	26	11	9	6	49	33	+16	31	Swiss Cup winners, qualified for 1975–76 Cup Winners' Cup
5	FC Sion	26	12	7	7	45	30	+15	31	
6	Lausanne-Sport	26	10	9	7	40	35	+5	29	
7	Servette	26	10	7	9	43	35	+8	27	
8	Winterthur	26	9	8	9	36	31	+5	26	
9	Xamax	26	9	6	11	47	47	0	24	Entered 1975 Intertoto Cup
10	Lugano	26	8	6	12	34	40	−6	22	
11	Chênois	26	6	8	12	27	55	−28	20	
12	St. Gallen	26	6	8	12	42	72	−30	20	
13	Luzern	26	5	6	15	33	58	−25	16	Relegated to 1975–76 Nationalliga B
14	Vevey-Sports	26	3	7	16	31	67	−36	13	Relegated to 1975–76 Nationalliga B

Source: rsssf.com
Rules for classification: 1) Points; 2) Goal difference within the league, however with play-off for qualifiers;

=== Swiss Cup ===
21 September 1974 Round 4	Gossau	0–3 (a.e.t.)	Zürich	Sportanlage Buechenwald, Gossau
		FCZ summary	98' (0:1) Rutschmann; 104' (0:2) Kuhn; 108' (0:3) Jeandupeux	Attendance: 4,500 (sold-out); Referee: (Switzerland) Hans Schuhmacher (Pfungen)
Note: Der FC Gossau spielte in der Saison 1974/75 in der 1. Liga. Zuschauerrekord

16 Obtober 1974 Round 5	Zürich	1–3	Basel	Letzigrund, Zürich
20:15	Martinelli 6' (1:0); Zigerlig (yellow card) 18'; Bionda (yellow card) 61'; Heer (yellow card) 81'	FCZ summary FCB summary	12' (1:1) Hitzfeld; (yellow card) 16' Hasler; (yellow card) 26' Fischli; (yellow card) 40' Odermatt; 52' (1:2) Ramseier; 62' (1:3) Hitzfeld	Attendance: 13,500; Referee: (Switzerland) Bruno Della Bruna Lumino
Note: 76. Tor von Hitzfeld wegen Offside nicht gegeben.

=== Swiss League Cup ===
3 August 1974 Round 1	Zürich	3–0	Winterthur	Letzigrund, Zürich
17:00	Jeandupeux 29' (1:0); Kuhn 57' (2:0); Jeandupeux 86' (3:0)	FCZ summary		Attendance: 4,000; Referee: (Switzerland) Walter Hungerbühler (St. Gallen)
Note: Corners: 11:1

8 August 1974 Round 2	Bellinzona	1–4	Zürich	Stadio Comunale Bellinzona, Bellinzona
	Bang 31' (1:0); Tagli (yellow card); Manzoni (yellow card)	FCZ summary	56' (1:1) Martinelli; 75' (1:2) Jeandupeux; 78' (1:3) Jeandupeux; 83' (1:4) Katić	Attendance: 2,000; Referee: (Switzerland) Kurt Fuchs (Basel)
Note: Evening match under ideal conditions.

13 August 1974 Quarter-final	Étoile Carouge	2–3 (a.e.t.)	Zürich	Stade de la Fontenette, Carouge
	Manai 6' (1:0); Meier 26' (2:0)	FCZ summary	(yellow card) 25' Martinelli; (yellow card) 51' Zigerlig; 61' (1:2) Katić; 77' (2:2) Rutschmann; 101' (2:3) Botteron	Attendance: 4,500; Referee: (Switzerland) Ulysse Darbellay (Roche, Vaud)
Note: Very warm

24 September 1974 Semi-final	Zürich	5–1	Xamax	Letzigrund, Zürich
	Heer 30' (1:0); Zigerlig (yellow card) 43'; Bionda 51' (2:1); Kuhn 53' (3:1); Rutschmann 75' (pen. 4:1); Botteron 86' (5:1)	FCZ summary	45' (1:1) Müller	Attendance: 2,500; Referee: (Switzerland) Mario Osta (Oberuzwil)
Note: Torrential rain before kick-off.

26 March 1975 Final	Zürich	0–3	Grasshopper Club	Letzigrund, Zürich
		FCZ summary	(0:1) Grahn; 53' (0:2) Elsener; (yellow card) 63' Grahn; 75' (0:3) Bosco	Attendance: 8,500; Referee: (Switzerland) Walter Hungerbühler (St. Gallen)

=== European Cup ===
18 September 1974 First round 1st leg	Leeds United (England)	4–1	(Switzerland) FC Zürich	Elland Road, Leeds
	Clarke 15' (1:0); Lorimer 25' (pen.); Clarke 42' (3:0); Jordan 48' (4:0)	Report; FCZ summary	89' (4:1) Katić	Attendance: 20,012; Referee: Jan Keizer (Netherlands)

2 October 1974 Second round 2nd leg	FC Zürich (Switzerland)	2–1 (3–5 agg.)	(England) Leeds United	Letzigrund, Zürich
	Katić 37' (1:1); Rutschmann 42' (pen. 2:1)	Report; FCZ summary	36' (0:1) Clarke	Attendance: 13,382; Referee: Sergio Gonella (Italy)

Leeds United won 5–3 on aggregate.

=== Intertoto Cup ===
==== Group 1 matches ====
15 June 1974 Matchday 1	Zürich (Switzerland)	3–2	(West Germany) Hertha Berlin	Letzigrund, Zürich
20:15	Schweizer 18' (1:0); Rutschmann 35' (2:1); Schweizer 77' (2:1)	FCZ summary	30' (pen 1:1) Müller; 85' (3:2) Brück; (yellow card) Müller	Attendance: 1,800; Referee: (Switzerland) Anton Bucheli (Luzern)

29 June 1974 Matchday 2	Austria Salzburg	0–2	(Switzerland) Zürich	Lehener Stadion, Salzburg
		FCZ summary	31' (0:1) Botteron; 78' (0:2) Katić	Attendance: 800; Referee: (Austria) Josef Jegel

7 July 1974 Matchday 3	Öster (Sweden)	0–2	(Switzerland) Zürich	Växjö
		FCZ summary	46' (0:1) Martinelli; 89' (pen 0:2) Rutschmann	Attendance: 307; Referee: (Sweden) Erik Fredriksson

13 July 1974 Matchday 4	Hertha Berlin (West Germany)	1–1	(Switzerland) Zürich	Herzogenaurach
	Horr 88' (1:1)	FCZ summary	70' (0:1) Marti	Attendance: 700
Note: Corners: 13:3

20 July 1974 Matchday 5	Zürich (Switzerland)	5–2	Austria Salzburg	Letzigrund, Zürich
	Katić 3' (1:0); 4' (2:0); Botteron 42' (3:1); Katić 54' (4:1); Martinelli 78' (5:2)	FCZ summary	8' (2:1) Libuda; 55' (4:2) Hala; (yellow card) Schwarz	Attendance: 2,000; Referee: (Switzerland) Meier

28 July 1974 Matchday 6	Zürich (Switzerland)	1–0	(Sweden) Öster	Scharten, Baden
	Rutschmann 53' (pen 1:0)	FCZ summary		Attendance: 2,100; Referee: (Switzerland) Jean Dubach (Nidau)

==== Final group table ====
Pos	Team	Pld	W	D	L	GF	GA	GD	Pts	ZÜR	HER	ÖST	SAL
1	(Switzerland) Zürich	6	5	1	0	14	5	+9	11	—	3–2	1–0	5–2
2	(West Germany) Hertha Berlin	6	3	1	2	10	7	+3	7	1–1	—	1–0	2–0
3	(Sweden) Öster	6	2	0	4	7	8	−1	4	0–2	2–4	—	3–0
4	Austria Salzburg	6	1	0	5	3	14	−11	2	0–2	1–0	0–2	—

Source: mogiel.net
Rules for classification: 1) Points; 2) Goal difference; 3) Goals scored; 4) Head-to-head points; 5) Away goals scored; 6) Draw.

=== Friendly matches ===
==== Early mid-season ====
4 August 1974 Mid-season	Vaduz	1–5	Zürich	Landessportplatz, Vaduz
	Negele 44' (1:1)	FCZ summary	23' (0:1) Jeandupeux; 58' (1:2) Katić; 72' (1:4) Schweizer; 81' (o.g.); 85' (1:5) Schweizer	Attendance: 6,000; Referee: (Switzerland) René Kellenberger (Herisau)

==== Winter break and mid-season ====
1 February 1974 Winter break	Aarau	3–11	Zürich	Stadion Brügglifeld, Aarau
	Caduff 18' (1:2); Caduff 55' (2:6); Joseph 70' (3:8)	FCZ summary	6' (0:1) Martinelli; 7' (0:2) Martinelli; 22' (1:3) Katić; 26' (1:4) Katić; 35' (1:5) Katić; 50' (1:6) Martinelli; 57' (2:7) Katić; 67' (2:8) Katić; 79' (3:9) Jeandupeux; 81' (3:10) Katić; 86' (3:11) Marti	Attendance: 700; Referee: (Switzerland) Schnydrig
Note: Pitch very suitable for play

2 February 1975 Winter break	Bellinzona	1–3	Zürich	Stadio Comunale, Bellinzona
	Bionda 53' (1:0); Manzoni (yellow card)	FCZ summary	60' (1:1) Schweizer; 74' (1:2) Stierli; 79' (1:3) Stierli	Attendance: 600; Referee: (Switzerland) Bruno della Bruna (Lumino)

5 February 1975 Winter break	Wettingen	0–4	Zürich	Stadion Altenburg, Wettingen
		FCZ summary	37' (0:1) Botteron; 53' (0:2) Schweizer; 85' (og 0:3) (Robert Baldinger); 87' (0:4) Jeandupeux	Attendance: 600; Referee: (Switzerland) Kropf (Basel)
Note: Good playable pitch

8 February 1974 Winter break	Nordstern Basel	2–3	Zürich	Rankhof, Basel
	Stettler (40 pen. 1:2); Meier 49' (2:2)	FCZ summary	7' (0:1) Rutschmann; 26' (0:2) Katić; 76' (2:3) Martinelli	Attendance: 1,200; Referee: (Switzerland) Werner Bösch (Sutz-Lattrigen)
Note: Second half played in dense fog.

15 February 1975 Winter break	Basel	3–0	Zürich	St. Jakob Stadium, Basel
18:00	Balmer 2' (1:0); Stohler 39' (2:0); Hasler 69' (3:0)	FCZ summary FCB summary	(penalty missed) 88′ Rutschmann	Attendance: 2,500; Referee: (Switzerland) Rudolf Renggli (Luzern)

16 February 1974 Winter break	St. Gallen	1–5	Zürich	Espenmoos, St. Gallen
	Seger 39' (1:4)	FCZ summary	13' (0:1) Martinelli; 15' (0:2) Botteron; 27' (0:3) Marti; 35' (0:4) Marti; 59' (1:5) Hartmann	Attendance: 800; Referee: (Switzerland) Walter Hungerbühler (St. Gallen)
Note: Pitch covered with a layer of snow as deep as a shoe.

20 February 1974 Winter break	Winterthur	0–1	Zürich	Schützenwiese, Winterthur
		FCZ summary	5' (0:1) Botteron	Attendance: 2,000; Referee: (Switzerland) Dreier (Zürich)
Note: The ground was dull and soft, so the ball couldn't get any speed.

1 March 1974 Winter break	Losone Sportiva	1–6	Zürich	Campo Sportivo Saleggi, Losone
	Camesi 60' (1:4)	FCZ summary	12' (0:1) Schweizer; 25' (0:2) Schweizer; 40' (0:3) Marti; 43' (0:4) Stierli; 80' (1:5) Marti; 82' (1:6) Marti	Attendance: 600; Referee: (Switzerland) Prudente (Bellinzona)

2 March 1974 Winter break	US Giubiasco	1–4	Zürich	Campo Sportivo Saleggi, Losone
	Jorio 15' (1:0)	FCZ summary	(penalty missed) 19′ Rutschmann; 20' (1:1) Jeandupeux; 30' (1:2) Marti; 40' (1:3) Jeandupeux; 44' (1:4) Rutschmann	Attendance: 350; Referee: (Switzerland) Prudente (Bellinzona)
Note: Playing time: 81 minutes.

9 March 1974 Winter break	Xamax	1–1	Zürich	Stade de la Maladière (1924), Neuchâtel
	Müller 53' (1:0)	FCZ summary	85' (1:1) Rutschmann	Attendance: 2,000; Referee: (Switzerland) Longaretti (Neuchâtel)
Note: Delayed farewell match for Rudi Brunnenmeier

7 May 1974 Mid-season	Kriens	1–3	Zürich	Stadion Kleinfeld, Kriens
	Bucher 23' (1:1)	FCZ summary	3' (0:1) Anthon; 56' (o.g.) (Perdon); 62' (1:3) Bionda	Attendance: 300; Referee: (Switzerland) Rudolf Renggli (Luzern)

3 June 1974 Mid-season	Zürich	1–2	Valencia CF	Letzigrund, Zürich
	Senn 50' (1:1)	FCZ summary	34' (0:1) Jara; 58' (1:2) Sergio	Attendance: 3,000; Referee: (Switzerland) Walter Hungerbühler (St. Gallen)
Note: Pleasant conditions for a quarter of an hour, then rain showers. Pitch in good condition.

== Sources and references ==
- Switzerland 1974–75 at RSSSF
- Swiss League Cup at RSSSF

Preceded by 1973–74	FC Zürich seasons	Succeeded by 1975–76
