= 1975–76 Swiss League Cup =

Tournament details
- Country: Switzerland
- Teams: 32

Final positions
- Champions: Young Boys
- Runners-up: Zürich

Tournament statistics
- Matches played: 31

The 1975–76 Swiss League Cup was the fourth edidition of the Swiss League Cup competition. The first round was played in summer 1975 as a pre-season warm-up to the 1975–76 Swiss football season, the later rounds were played during the season.

== Overview ==
The League Cup had been created three seasons earlier to allow clubs from the top two tiers to compete in a tournament in advance of the league season, with the semi-finals and final played in the Autumn. But this season only the first round was played in advance of the season, the later rounds were played in the second half of the league season. The draw respected regionalities, when possible.

The matches were played in a single knockout format. In the event of a draw after 90 minutes, the match went into extra time. In the event of a draw at the end of extra time, a penalty shoot-out was to decide which team qualified for the next round. No replays were foreseen.

== First round ==
=== Summary ===
Team 1	Score	Team 2
2 August 1975
Gossau	6–3 (a.e.t.)	Wettingen
Solothurn	1–3	Grenchen
Xamax	0–1	La Chaux-de-Fonds
Vevey-Sports	3–2	Chênois
Chiasso	2–0	Luzern
3 August 1975
Monthey	3–2	Martigny-Sports
Laufen	3–2	Biel-Bienne
Blue Stars	1–6	Young Fellows
Bellinzona	1–4	Lugano
6 August 1975
Etoile Carouge	1–2	Lausanne-Sport
9 August 1975
Zürich	2–2 (a.e.t.) (4–2 p)	Grasshopper Club
St. Gallen	1–4	Basel
FC Raron	2–0	Servette
12 August 1975
Fribourg	0–2	Sion
Aarau	3–5 (a.e.t.)	Young Boys
Nordstern Basel	2–0	Winterthur

=== Matches ===
9 August 1975
20:00

Zürich	2–2 (a.e.t.)	Grasshopper Club
Katić 50' (1:0); Katić 102' (2:2)	FCZ summary	18' (0:1) Barberis; 94' (1:2) Elsener
Penalties
Risi (penalty scored); Sanfilippo (penalty missed); Kuhn (penalty scored); Botteron (penalty scored); Rutschmann (penalty scored)	4–2	(penalty scored) Gross; (penalty scored) Elsener; (penalty missed) Bosco; (penalty missed) Cornioley

Letzigrund, Zürich
Attendance: 9,500
Referee: (Switzerland) René Matthieu (Sierre)

9 August 1995
20:15

St. Gallen	1–4	Basel
Brander (yellow card) 63'; Schneeberger 81' (1:3)	FCB summary	7' (0:1) Muhmenthaler; 41' (0:2) Muhmenthaler; 52' (0:3) Marti; 88' (1:4) Marti

Espenmoos, St. Gallen
Attendance: 4,300
Referee: (Switzerland) Otto Wyniger Wetzikon

9 August 1975

FC Raron	2–0	Servette
Goal	Servette summary

Sportplatz Rhoneglut, Raron

12 August 1975

Aarau	3–5 (a.e.t.)	Young Boys
Wolfensberger 21' (1:0); Züttel (yellow card) 51'; Züttel 64' (2:3); Schmid 74' (3:3)	YB summary	22' (1:1) Noventa; 53' (1:2) Rebmann; 57' (1:3) Bruttin; 91' (3:4) Noventa; 96' (3:5) Noventa

Stadion Brügglifeld, Aarau
Attendance: 2,400
Referee: (Switzerland) René Kellenberger (Herisau)

== Second round ==
=== Summary ===
Team 1	Score	Team 2
22 February 1976
Laufen	1–7	Zürich
Lausanne-Sport	1–2	Sion
Gossau	2–1	Chiasso
Nordstern Basel	0–2	Lugano
Vevey Sports	1–2	Grenchen
Young Fellows Zürich	1–8	Basel
Monthey	1–1 (a.e.t.) (0–3 p)	FC Raron
Young Boys	4–0	La Chaux-de-Fonds

=== Matches ===
22 February 1976

Laufen	1–7	Zürich
Kellerhals 88' (pen. 1:7)	FCZ summary	20' (pen. 0:1) Rutschmann; 30' (0:2) Katić; 37' (0:3) Kuhn; 58' (0:4) Kuhn; 62' (o.g.) (Dietler); 67' (0:6) Scheiwiler; 81' (o.g.) Kellerhals

St. Jakob Stadium, Basel
Attendance: 1,800
Referee: (Switzerland) Jean-Marie Macheret (Rueyres-Saint-Laurent)

22 February 1976
14:30

Young Fellows Zürich	1–8	Basel
Senn 11' (1:3)	FCB summary	3' (0:1) Marti; 7' (0:2) Hasler; 10' (0:3) Muhmenthaler; 24' (1:4) Muhmenthaler; 37' (pen. 1:5) Mundschin; 59' (1:6) Hasler; 63' (1:7) von Wartburg; 75' (1:8) Marti

Letzigrund, Zürich
Attendance: 1,029
Referee: (Switzerland) Gottlieb Barmettler Luzern

22 February 1976

Young Boys	4–0	La Chaux-de-Fonds
Siegenthaler 49' (1:0); Andersen 55' (2:0); Andersen (penalty missed) 66′ Burkhardt 77' (3:0); Siegenthaler 80' (4:0)	YB summary

Wankdorf Stadium, Bern
Attendance: 2,800
Referee: (Switzerland) Roland Racine (Prilly)

== Quarter-finals ==
=== Summary ===
Team 1	Score	Team 2
28 February 19
Grenchen	2–6	Basel
FC Raron	0–3	Young Boys
29 February 19
Sion	8–2	Gossau
Lugano	0–1 (a.e.t.)	Zürich

=== Matches ===
28 February 1976
17:00

Grenchen	2–6	Basel
Braun (yellow card) 21'; Wirth 78' (1:4); Waeber 86' (2:6)	FCB summary	6' (0:1) von Wartburg; (yellow card) 13' Nielsen; 30' (0:2) Marti; 51' (0:3) Tanner; 74' (0:4) Marti; 80' (1:5) Marti; 85' (1:6) Schönenberger

Stadium Brühl, Grenchen
Attendance: 1,200
Referee: (Switzerland) Mario Osta Oberuzwil

28 February 1976

FC Raron	0–3	Young Boys
	YB summary	40' (0:1) Conz; 45' (0:2) Conz; 75' (0:3) Küttel

Sportplatz Rhoneglut, Raron
Attendance: 1,500
Referee: (Switzerland) Ernest Guignet (Yverdon-les-Bains)

29 February 1976

Sion	8–2	Gossau
Trinchero 11' (pen.); Vergères 24' (2:1); Pillet 31' (3:1); Luisier 64' (4:1); Pillet 72' (5:1); Cucinotta 73' (6:1); Vergères 81' (7:2); Luisier 89' (8:2)	RSSSF summary	17' (1:1) Brunner; 77' (pen. 6:2) W.Dürr

(Tourbillon), Sion

29 February 1976

Lugano	0–1 (a.e.t.)	Zürich
Lalic (yellow card) 14'; Brenna (yellow card) 66'; Lanfranconi (yellow card) 48' (yellow-red card) 86'	FCZ summary	108' (pen.) Rutschmann

Cornaredo Stadium, Lugano
Attendance: 2,000
Referee: (Switzerland) Ernst Dörflinger (Grenchen)

== Semi-finals ==
=== Summary ===
Team 1	Score	Team 2
27 April 1976
Basel	3–5 (a.e.t.)	Young Boys
Zürich	5–0	Sion

=== Matches ===
27 April 1976
20:00

Basel	3–5 (a.e.t.)	BSC Young Boys
Mundschin 38' (1:2); Mundschin 58' (2:2); Hasler (yellow card) 63'; Stohler 99' (pen. 3:2); Fischli (yellow card) 113'	FCB summary YB summary	11' (0:1) Burkhardt; 25' (0:2) Rebmann; 101' (pen. 3:3) Odermatt; 103' (3:4) Bruttin; (yellow card) 105' Vögeli; 108' (3:5) Küttel

St. Jakob Stadium, Basel
Attendance: 10,300
Referee: (Switzerland) Mario Osta Oberuzwil

27 April 1976

Zürich	5–0	Sion
Risi 22' (1:0); Martinelli 29' (2:0); Katić 55' (3:0); Risi 65' (4:0); Katić 79' (5:0)	FCZ summary	(yellow card) 5' Trinchero

Letzigrund, Zürich
Attendance: 2,000
Referee: (Switzerland) Peter Scherz (Aegerten)

== Final ==
The final was held in the former Wankdorf Stadium in Bern on 23 May 1976.

=== Summary ===
Team 1	Score	Team 2
23 May 1976
Young Boys	4–2	Zürich

=== Telegram ===
23 May 1976

Young Boys	4–2	Zürich
Küttel 1' (1:0); Bruttin 67' (2:0); Küttel 71' (3:0); Rebmann 73' (4:0)	YB summery FCZ summary	80' (4:1) Katić; (yellow card) 83' Katić; 87' (4:0) Katić

Wankdorf Stadium, Bern
Attendance: 10,000
Referee: (Switzerland) Roland Racine (Prilly)

Young Boys won the cup and this was the club's first League Cup title to this date.

== Further in Swiss football ==
- 1975–76 Nationalliga A
- 1975–76 Swiss 1. Liga
- 1975–76 Swiss Cup
