= 1974–75 Swiss League Cup =

Tournament details
- Country: Switzerland
- Teams: 32

Final positions
- Champions: Grasshopper Club
- Runners-up: Zürich

Tournament statistics
- Matches played: 31

The 1974–75 Swiss League Cup was the third Swiss League Cup competition. The early stages were played in summer 1974 as a pre-season tournament to the 1974–75 Swiss football season, the semi-finals were played in September and the final was due to be played in November, but it was cancelled and postponed until March 1975. It was won by Grasshopper Club who defeated Zürich 3–0 in the final at the Letzigrund in Zürich.

== Overview ==
The League Cup had been created two seasons earlier to allow clubs from the top two tiers to compete in a tournament in advance of the league season, with the semi-finals and final played in the Autumn. There was no seeding and no qualifying-stage this year, but an additional round was added. The teams from the two top-tiers were joined by Baden, Emmenbrücke, Frauenfeld and Monthey from the third-tier. The draw was respecting regionalities, when possible. In the competition, the matches were played in a single knockout format. In the event of a draw after 90 minutes, the match went into extra time. In the event of a draw at the end of extra time, a penalty shoot-out was to decide which team qualified for the next round and no replays were foreseen.

== First round ==
=== Summary ===
Team 1	Score	Team 2
3 August 1974
La Chaux-de-Fonds	1–4	Étoile Carouge
Monthey	0–10	Lausanne-Sport
Bellinzona	2–1	Mendrisiostar
Zürich	3–0	Winterthur
Nordstern Basel	1–2	Xamax
Emmenbrücke	2–2(a.e.t.) (1–4 p)	Biel-Bienne
Young Boys	2–4	Basel
Luzern	4–0	US Giubiasco
Chiasso	1–1(a.e.t.) (5–3 p)	Lugano
Frauenfeld	0–2	Grasshopper Club
FC Raron	3–8	Sion
Grenchen	0–2	Fribourg
Martigny-Sports	2–3	Vevey-Sports
Servette	2–0	Chênois
Aarau	3–1	Wettingen
Baden	3–3(a.e.t.) (8–9 p)	St. Gallen

=== Matches ===
3 August 1974
17:00

Zürich	3–0	Winterthur
Jeandupeux 29' (1:0); Kuhn 57' (2:0); Jeandupeux 86' (3:0)	FCZ summary

Letzigrund, Zürich
Attendance: 4,000
Referee: (Switzerland) Walter Hungerbühler (St. Gallen)

3 August 1974
20:15

Young Boys	2–4	Basel
Leuzinger 24' (1:0); Bruttin (yellow card) 35'; Bruttin 42' (2:1)	FCB summary	35' (1:1) Nielsen; 47' (2:2) Balmer; Schönebeck 87' (2:3); Wirth 90' (2:4)

Wankdorf Stadium, Bern
Attendance: 9,000
Referee: (Switzerland) Otto Isler Zürich

3 August 1974

Servette	2–0	Chênois
Barriquand 25' (1:0); Barriquand 70' (2:0)	Servette summary

Charmilles Stadium, Geneva

3 August 1974

Aarau	3–1	Wettingen
Goal	FCA summary	Goal

Stadion Brügglifeld, Aarau

== Second round ==
=== Summary ===
Team 1	Score	Team 2
7 August 1974
Étoile Carouge	1–0	Lausanne-Sport
Xamax	4–0	Biel-Bienne
Basel	5–2	Luzern
Chiasso	1–4	Grasshopper Club
Sion	3–0	Fribourg
Vevey-Sports	3–2	Servette
Aarau	1–0	St. Gallen
8 August 1974
Bellinzona	1–4	Zürich

=== Matches ===
7 August 1974
20:00

Basel	5–2	Luzern
Wirth 9' (1:0); Tanner 17' (2:0); Tanner 19' (2:0); Ramseier 65' (4:0) von Wartburg 69' (5:1); Tanner (yellow card) 78'	FCB summary	68' (4:1) Küttel; 79' (5:2) Schaller

St. Jakob Stadium, Basel
Attendance: 5,500
Referee: (Switzerland) Mario Osta Oberuzwil

7 August 1974

Vevey-Sports	3–2	Servette
Goal	Servette summary	Barriquand; Petrović

Stade de Copet, Vevey

7 August 1974

Aarau	1–0	St. Gallen
Goal	FCA summary

Stadion Brügglifeld, Aarau

8 August 1974

Bellinzona	1–4	Zürich
Bang 31' (1:0); Tagli (yellow card); Manzoni (yellow card)	FCZ summary	56' (1:1) Martinelli; 75' (1:2) Jeandupeux; 78' (1:3) Jeandupeux; 83' (1:4) Katić

Stadio Comunale Bellinzona, Bellinzona
Attendance: 2,000
Referee: (Switzerland) Kurt Fuchs (Basel)

== Quarter-finals ==
=== Summary ===
Team 1	Score	Team 2
13 August 1974
Étoile Carouge	2–3 (a.e.t.)	Zürich
Xamax	4–1	Sion
Basel	4–2 (a.e.t.)	Aarau
Grasshopper Club	4–1	Vevey-Sports

=== Matches ===
13 August 1974

Étoile Carouge	2–3 (a.e.t.)	Zürich
Manai 6' (1:0); Meier 26' (2:0)	FCZ summary	(yellow card) 25' Martinelli; (yellow card) 51' Zigerlig; 61' (1:2) Katić; 77' (2:2) Rutschmann; 101' (2:3) Botteron

Stade de la Fontenette, Carouge
Attendance: 4,500
Referee: (Switzerland) Ulysse Darbellay (Roche, Vaud)

13 August 1974

Xamax	4–1	Sion
Guillaume 26' (1:1); Elsig 30' (2:1); Mathez 41' (3:1); Claude 80' (4:1)	RSSSF summary	8' (0:1) Ricci

Stade de la Maladière, Neuchâtel

13 August 1974
20:00

Basel	4–2 (a.e.t.)	Aarau
Hitzfeld 86' (1:1); Schönenberger 94' (2:1); Schönenberger 98' (3:2); Ramseier 119' (4:2)	FCB Fummary	27' (0:1) Ponte; 96' (2:2) Caduff

St. Jakob Stadium, Basel
Attendance: 4,000
Referee: (Switzerland) Walter Gallmann Oberrieden

13 August 1974

Grasshopper Club	4–1	Vevey-Sports
Santrač 17' (1:1); Grahn 35' (2:1); Bigi Meyer 60' (3:1); Santrač 85' (4:1)	RSSSF summary	8' (0:1) Durussel

Hardturm, Zürich

== Semi-finals ==
=== Summary ===
Team 1	Score	Team 2
24 September 1974
Zürich	5–1	Xamax
25 September 1974
Basel	1–3	Grasshopper Club

=== Matches ===
24 September 1974

Zürich	5–1	Xamax
Heer 30' (1:0); Zigerlig (yellow card) 43'; Bionda 51' (2:1); Kuhn 53' (3:1); Rutschmann 75' (pen. 4:1); Botteron 86' (5:1)	FCZ summary	45' (1:1) Müller

Letzigrund, Zürich
Attendance: 2,500
Referee: (Switzerland) Mario Osta (Oberuzwil)

25 September 1974
20:00

Basel	1–3	Grasshopper Club
Mundschin 29' (1:2)	FCB summary	25' (0:1) Elsener; 27' (0:2) Noventa; (yellow card) 36' Santrač; 87' (1:3) Ohlhauser

St. Jakob Stadium, Basel
Attendance: 5,800
Referee: (Switzerland) Ernest Guignet Yverdon

== Final ==
The final was held at the Letzigrund in Zürich on Wednesday 26 March 1975.

=== Summary ===
Team 1	Score	Team 2
26 March 1975
Zürich	0–3	Grasshopper Club

=== Telegram ===
26 March 1975

Zürich	0–3	Grasshopper Club
	FCZ summary	(0:1) Grahn; 53' (0:2) Elsener; (yellow card) 63' Grahn; 75' (0:3) Bosco

Letzigrund, Zürich
Attendance: 8,500
Referee: (Switzerland) Walter Hungerbühler (St. Gallen)

Grasshopper Club won the cup and this was the club's second cup title in a row.

== Further in Swiss football ==
- 1974–75 Nationalliga A
- 1974–75 Swiss 1. Liga
- 1974–75 Swiss Cup
