= 1976–77 Swiss Cup =

Tournament details
- Country: Switzerland

Final positions
- Champions: Young Boys
- Runners-up: St. Gallen

The 1976–77 Swiss Cup was the 52nd season of Switzerland's annual football cup competition.

== Overview ==
The cup competition began on 6 June 1976, with the first games of the first round, but this round was not completed until 8 August. The entire competition was to be completed on Easter Monday 11 April 1978 with the final, which was held at the former Wankdorf Stadium in Bern. The clubs from this season's Nationalliga B (NLB) were granted byes for the first round. These entered the competition for the second round, played on the weekend of 14 and 15 of August. The clubs from this season's Nationalliga A (NLA) were granted byes for the first three rounds. These teams joined the competition in the fourth round on 25 and 26 September. The matches were played in a knockout format. Up until the fifth-round, in the event of a draw at the end of extra time, the match was decided with a penalty shoot-out. In and after the fifth-round, a replay was foreseen and this was played on the visiting team's pitch. The winners of the cup qualified themselves for the first round of the Cup Winners' Cup in the next season.

== Round 1 ==
The teams from the lower divisions, who had qualified for this round through their regional football association's cup competitions or their requirements, competed in the first round.

=== Summary ===
Team 1	Score	Team 2
6 June 1976
FC Tresa	2–0	Locarno
FC Widnau	3–0	Vaduz
13 June 1976
FC Aegerten/Brügg	4–0	Lengnau
FC Langenthal	2–0	Köniz
WEF Bern	0–1	Dürrenast
Sparta Bern	2–0	Solothurn
FC Grafenried	3–4	FC Gerlafingen
Muttenz	3–4	Concordia
FC Breitenbach	0–4	SC Kleinhüningen
Old Boys	2–1	FC Aesch
FC Pratteln	2–6	Laufen
FC Seefeld ZH	2–7	FC Dübendorf
Polizei Zürich	3–1	Blue Stars
FC Wetzikon	1–5	FC Zug
FC Fortuna St.Gallen	2–1	Chur
FC Uzwil	0–1	Brühl
SC Emmen	3–4 (a.e.t.)	Emmenbrücke
Luzerner SC	0–1	Buochs
FC Sursee	7–3	FC Brunnen
FC Ebikon	2–4	Kickers Luzern
FC Renens	3–0	Stade Nyonnais
Signal FC (Bernex)	3–2	Meyrin
FC Saint-Prex	1–6	Urania Genève Sport
Yverdon-Sport	1–0	CS La Tour-de-Peilz
FC Concordia Lausanne	2–5 (a.e.t.)	Stade Lausanne
FC Chalais	0–1 (a.e.t.)	Monthey
CS Romont	4–2	FC Gurmels
FC Moudon	2–1	FC Courtepin
FC Tafers	1–2	FC Fétigny
Cortaillod	0–3 (a.e.t.)	FC Boudry
FC Lamboing	3–8	ASI Audax-Friul
Courtemaîche	2–5	US Boncourt
FC Klus-Balsthal	1–2 (a.e.t.)	FC Birsfelden
FC Bremgarten	0–2	Baden
FC Kölliken	0–5	FC Buchs AG
FC Männedorf	1–3	FC Rüti ZH
FC Dielsdorf	0–5	Schaffhausen
FC Oerlikon ZH	1–1 (a.e.t.) (p)	FC Bülach
FC Wülfingen	5–1	FC Bischofszell
FC Romanshorn	1–4	Frauenfeld
FC Bad Ragaz	1–7	FC Flawil
AS Gambarogno	3–4 (a.e.t.)	FC Morbio
FC Armonia Lugano	2–1	US Giubiasco
20 June 1976
FC Altstätten (St. Gallen)	4–1	FC Weinfelden-Bürglen
FC Biberist	2–3	Delémont
FC Herzogenbuchsee	3–3 (a.e.t.) (p)	Bern
FC Naters	6–3	FC Ayent
FC La Sagne	1–3	Le Locle-Sports
SC Düdingen	1–4	Bulle
27 June 1976
FC Superga (La Chaux-de-Fonds)	4–1	FC Bôle
8 August 1976
FC Orbe	1–2	Montreux-Sports
FC Saint-Légier	2–2 (a.e.t.) (3–5 p)	FC Granges-Marnand
FC Schüpfen	1–2	FC Lerchenfeld
SV Würenlos	0–3	FC Binningen
FC Gränichen	2–4	FC Turgi
FC Küsnacht ZH	2–0	SC Zug
SV Höngg	1–4	FC Tössfeld
FC Adliswil	3–1 (a.e.t.)	Red Star
FC Agno	0–1	Mendrisiostar
FC Collex-Bossy	4–1	FC Onex
FC Leytron	1–2	FC Vouvry
FC Bévilard	1–4	FC Bettlach
FC Portalban	1–2	Central Fribourg

== Round 2 ==
The teams from the NLB entered the cup competition in the second round, they were seeded and could not be drawn against each other. Whenever possible, the draw respected local regionalities. The lower-tier team in each drawn tie was granted the home advantage.

=== Summary ===
Team 1	Score	Team 2
14 and 15 August 1976
FC Le Locle	1–2	ASI Audax-Friul
FC Superga (La Chaux-de-Fonds)	0–2	Biel-Bienne
Old Boys	3–0	Delémont
Concordia	0–6	Nordstern
FC Binningen	4–3	Aarau
FC Langenthal	1–2	Grenchen
Frauenfeld	3–1 (a.e.t.)	Brühl
Polizei Zürich	2–1	FC Oerlikon
Naters	2–0	Martigny-Sports
Monthey	0–1	FC Raron
Buochs	1–5	FC Zug
Emmenbrücke	0–0 (a.e.t.) (6–5 p)	Luzern
FC Sursee	2–1	FC Küsnacht
Central Fribourg	0–4	FC Lerchenfeld
Yverdon-Sport	0–2	FC Boudry
FC Gerlafingen	1–2 (a.e.t.)	La Chaux-de-Fonds
FC Aegerten/Brügg	3–5 (a.e.t.)	FC Bettlach
Laufen	3–1	SC Kleinhüningen
FC Vouvry	2–6	Vevey Sports
FC Fétigny	3–2 (a.e.t.)	Sparta Bern
FC Armonia Lugano	1–4	Lugano
FC Morbio	3–2	FC Tresa
FC Altstätten (St. Gallen)	4–2	FC Flawil
FC Turgi	1–2	Wettingen
FC Dübendorf	0–3	FC Adliswil
FC Buchs	5–3	FC Rüti ZH
FC Granges-Marnand	1–3	FC Moudon
Stade Lausanne	2–2 (a.e.t.) (4–3 p)	FC Renens
FC Widnau	1–5	Gossau
Schaffhausen	2–2 (a.e.t.) (6–5 p)	FC Tössfeld
Kriens	4–0	Kickers Luzern
Mendrisiostar	0–2	Chiasso
FC Wülfingen	2–6	Fortuna St.Gallen
Baden	0–3	Young Fellows
Montreux-Sports	3–0	CS Romont
Signal FC (Bernex)	1–7	Etoile Carouge
US Boncourt	1–0	FC Birsfelden
FC Dürrenast	3–0	Bulle
Bern	1–2	Fribourg
FC Collex-Bossy	3–0	Urania Genève Sport

=== Matches ===
14 August 1976

FC Binningen	4–3	Aarau
Goal	FCA summary	Goal

Spiegelfeld, Binningen

== Round 3 ==
=== Summary ===
Team 1	Score	Team 2
4 September 1976
Vevey Sports	2–1	FC Fétigny
Lugano	2–0	FC Morbio
Kriens	4–2 (a.e.t.)	Chiasso
5 September 1976
Montreux-Sports	1–3	Etoile Carouge
FC Boudry	0–4	La Chaux-de-Fonds
ASI Audax-Friul	1–1 (a.e.t.) (2–3 p)	Biel-Bienne
Old Boys	0–4	Nordstern
SC Binningen	1–2	Grenchen
Frauenfeld	0–1	Polizei Zürich
Naters	2–5	FC Raron
FC Zug	1–0 (a.e.t.)	Emmenbrücke
FC Sursee	1–3	FC Lerchenfeld
FC Bettlach	1–1 (a.e.t.) (4–5 p)	Laufen
FC Altstätten (St. Gallen)	1–1 (a.e.t.) (5–4 p)	Wettingen
FC Adliswil	2–0	FC Buchs
FC Moudon	1–2	Stade Lausanne
Gossau	4–1	Schaffhausen
Fortuna St.Gallen	1–4	Young Fellows
US Boncourt	4–2	Dürrenast
Fribourg	5–0	FC Collex-Bossy

== Round 4 ==
The teams from the NLA entered the cup competition in the fourth round, they were seeded and could not be drawn against each other. The draw was still respecting regionalities and the lower-tier team was again granted the home advantage.

=== Summary ===
Team 1	Score	Team 2
25 September 1976
FC Zug	1–2	Bellinzona
FC Raron	0–1	Lausanne-Sport
US Boncourt	0–6	Xamax
Grenchen	5–0	Polizei Zürich
FC Altstätten (St. Gallen)	1–6	Winterthur
Biel-Bienne	1–2 (a.e.t.)	Nordstern
Gossau	1–3	Grasshopper Club
Etoile Carouge	2–1	Chênois
Vevey Sports	3–2	Servette
Fribourg	1–2 (a.e.t.)	Basel
Kriens	1–0	Young Fellows
26 September 1976
La Chaux-de-Fonds	3–2	Laufen
Lugano	2–4	Zürich
FC Lerchenfeld	3–6	Young Boys
FC Adliswil	0–5	St. Gallen
Stade Lausanne	0–1 (a.e.t.)	Sion

=== Matches ===
25 September 1976

Vevey Sports	3–2	Servette
Goal	Servette summary	Chivers; Pfister

Stade de Copet, Vevey

25 September 1976
20:15

Fribourg	1–2 (a.e.t.)	Basel
Dorthe (yellow card) 58'; Amantini 88' (1:1)	FCB summary	57' (0:1) Marti; 93' (1:2) Demarmels

Stade Universitaire, Fribourg
Attendance: 3,200
Referee: (Switzerland) Alfred Heinis (Ammannsegg, Biberist)

26 September 1976
14:30

Lugano	2–4	Zürich
Signorelli 13' (1:2); Valsangiacomo 84' (2:3)	FCZ summary	7' (0:1) Stierli; 9' (0:2) Cucinotta; 76' (1:3) Scheiwiler; 90' (2:4) Weller

Cornaredo Stadium, Lugano
Referee: (Switzerland)

26 September 1976
14:30

FC Lerchenfeld	3–6	Young Boys
Rolf Imhof 16' (1:0); Zahnd 30' (2:1); Haldemann 79' (pen.)	YB summary	27' (1:1) Küttel; 42' (2:2) Lorenz; 47' (pen.) Lorenz; 53' (2:4) Lorenz; 81' (3:5) Burkhardt; 88' (3:6) Burkhardt

Sportanlagen Waldeck, Thun
Attendance: 4,300
Referee: (Switzerland) Jean Dubach (Nidau)

== Round 5 ==
=== Summary ===
Team 1	Score	Team 2
13 October 1976
Vevey Sports	0–2	Zürich
16 October 1976
Xamax	4–1 (a.e.t.)	Basel
17 October 1976
Nordstern	1–0 (a.e.t.)	Grenchen
Lausanne-Sport	3–1	Bellinzona
Young Boys	6–3	La Chaux-de-Fonds
Winterthur	0–1	St. Gallen
Sion	4–2	Grasshopper Club
Kriens	1–3	Etoile Carouge

=== Matches ===
13 October 1976

Vevey Sports	0–2	Zürich
	FCZ summary	(yellow card) 50' Heer; 81' (0:1) Rutschmann; 82' (0:2) Weller

Stade de Copet, Vevey
Attendance: 5,800
Referee: (Switzerland) Jean Dubach (Nidau)

16 October 1976
18:00

Xamax	4–1 (a.e.t.)	Basel
Bonny 78' (1:1); Rub 110' (2:1); Decastel 117' (3:1); Guggisberg 120' (4:1)	FCB summary	22' (0:1) Marti

Stade de la Maladière, Neuchâtel
Attendance: 5,000
Referee: (Switzerland) Gottlieb Barmettler (Luzern)

17 October 1976

Young Boys	6–3	La Chaux-de-Fonds
Rebmann 4' (1:0); Küttel 16' (2:0); Lorenz 39' (3:1); Brechbühl 41' (4:1); Küttel 69' (5:2); Küttel 76' (6:2)	YB summary	20' (2:1) Delavelle; 66' (4:2) Hulme; 83' (6:3) Schermesser

Wankdorf Stadium, Bern
Attendance: 4,100
Referee: (Switzerland) René Maire (Genève)

== Quarter-finals ==
=== Summary ===
Team 1	Score	Team 2
12 December 1976
Nordstern	1–3	Lausanne-Sport
Etoile Carouge	2–1	Neuchâtel Xamax
19 December 1976
St. Gallen	1–0 (a.e.t.)	Sion
Young Boys	2–1	Zürich

=== Matches ===
19 December 1976

St. Gallen	1–0 (a.e.t.)	Sion
Goal	[ summary]

Espenmoos, St. Gallen

19 December 1976

Young Boys	2–1	Zürich
Andersen (yellow card) 32'; Lorenz 42' (1:1); Vögeli (yellow card) 80'; Andersen 90' (2:1)	YB summary FCZ summary	40' (0:1) Cucinotta

Wankdorf Stadium, Bern
Attendance: 9,500
Referee: (Switzerland) Walter Hungerbühler (St. Gallen)

Remarks: This match was postponed on December 12 due to unplayable terrain (snow).

== Semi-finals ==
=== Summary ===
Team 1	Score	Team 2
20 March 1977
Lausanne-Sport	0–1 (a.e.t.)	Young Boys
21 March 1977
St. Gallen	0–0 (a.e.t.)	Etoile Carouge

Replay

Team 1	Score	Team 2
23 March 1977
Etoile Carouge	2–4	St. Gallen

=== Matches ===
20 March 1977

Lausanne-Sport	0–1 (a.e.t.)	Young Boys
	YB summary	120' (0:1) Küttel

Pontaise, Lausanne
Attendance: 12,800
Referee: (Switzerland) René Kellenberger (Herisau)

21 March 1977

St. Gallen	0–0 (a.e.t.)	Etoile Carouge
	[ summary]

Espenmoos, St. Gallen

23 March 1977

Etoile Carouge	2–4	St. Gallen
Ducommun 13' (1:0); Conus 61'	[ summary]	34' (1:1) Labhart; 41' (1:2) Mogg; 78' (2:3) Ries; 87' (2:4) Ries

Stade de la Fontenette, Carouge

== Final ==
The final was held at the former Wankdorf Stadium in Bern on East Monday 1977.

=== Summary ===
Team 1	Score	Team 2
11 April 1977
Young Boys	1–0	St. Gallen

=== Telegram ===
11 April 1977
15:00

Young Boys	1–0	St. Gallen
Andersen 76' (1:0); Mast (yellow card) 83'	Fussball-Schweiz summary	(yellow card) 40' Oettli

Wankdorf Stadium, Bern
Attendance: 25,000
Referee: (Switzerland) Ernest Guignet (Yverdon-les-Bains)

Young Boys, with Kurt Linder as head coach, won the cup and this was the club's fifth cup title to this date.

== Further in Swiss football ==
- 1976–77 Nationalliga A
- 1976–77 Swiss 1. Liga

== Sources ==
- Fussball-Schweiz
- Cup 1976–77 at fcb-achiv.ch
- Cup 1976–77 at bscyb.ch/archiv
- Switzerland 1976–77 at RSSSF

Preceded by 1975–76	Swiss Cup seasons	Succeeded by 1977–78
