= 1974 Intertoto Cup =

European football tournament

Tournament details
- Teams: 40

Final positions
- Champions: Group winners Zürich; Hamburg; Malmö FF; Standard Liège; Slovan Bratislava; Spartak Trnava; Duisburg; Baník Ostrava; Košice; CUF

Tournament statistics
- Matches played: 120

In the 1974 Intertoto Cup no knock-out rounds were contested, and therefore no winner was declared. This year marked the first edition a club from Turkey took part.

== Group stage ==
The teams were divided into ten groups of four teams each.

=== Group 1 ===
Pos	Team	Pld	W	D	L	GF	GA	GD	Pts	ZÜR	HER	ÖST	SAL
1	(Switzerland) Zürich	6	5	1	0	14	5	+9	11	—	3–2	1–0	5–2
2	(West Germany) Hertha Berlin	6	3	1	2	10	7	+3	7	1–1	—	1–0	2–0
3	(Sweden) Öster	6	2	0	4	7	8	−1	4	0–2	2–4	—	3–0
4	Austria Salzburg	6	1	0	5	3	14	−11	2	0–2	1–0	0–2	—

Source: mogiel.net
Rules for classification: 1) Points; 2) Goal difference; 3) Goals scored; 4) Head-to-head points; 5) Away goals scored; 6) Draw.

15 June 1974
20:15
Matchday 1

Zürich (Switzerland)	3–2	(West Germany) Hertha Berlin
Schweizer 18' (1:0); Rutschmann 35' (2:1); Schweizer 77' (2:1)	FCZ summary	30' (pen 1:1) Müller; 85' (3:2) Brück; (yellow card) Müller

Letzigrund, Zürich
Attendance: 1,800
Referee: (Switzerland) Anton Bucheli (Luzern)

29 June 1974
Matchday 2

Austria Salzburg	0–2	(Switzerland) Zürich
	FCZ summary	31' (0:1) Botteron; 78' (0:2) Katić

Lehener Stadion, Salzburg
Attendance: 800
Referee: (Austria) Josef Jegel

7 July 1974
Matchday 3

Öster (Sweden)	0–2	(Switzerland) Zürich
	FCZ summary	46' (0:1) Martinelli; 89' (pen 0:2) Rutschmann

Växjö
Attendance: 307
Referee: (Sweden) Erik Fredriksson

13 July 1974
Matchday 4

Hertha Berlin (West Germany)	1–1	(Switzerland) Zürich
Horr 88' (1:1)	FCZ summary	70' (0:1) Marti

Herzogenaurach
Attendance: 700

20 July 1974
Matchday 5

Zürich (Switzerland)	5–2	Austria Salzburg
Katić 3' (1:0); 4' (2:0); Botteron 42' (3:1); Katić 54' (4:1); Martinelli 78' (5:2)	FCZ summary	8' (2:1) Libuda; 55' (4:2) Hala; (yellow card) Schwarz

Letzigrund, Zürich
Attendance: 2,000
Referee: (Switzerland) Meier

28 July 1974
Matchday 6

Zürich (Switzerland)	1–0	(Sweden) Öster
Rutschmann 53' (pen 1:0)	FCZ summary

Scharten, Baden
Attendance: 2,100
Referee: (Switzerland) Jean Dubach (Nidau)

=== Group 2 ===
Pos	Team	Pld	W	D	L	GF	GA	GD	Pts	HAM	VIT	DJU	NEU
1	(West Germany) Hamburg	6	5	0	1	14	6	+8	10	—	2–0	2–0	5–2
2	(Portugal) Vitória Guimarães	6	4	0	2	15	8	+7	8	3–1	—	5–0	5–2
3	(Sweden) Djurgården	6	2	1	3	9	14	−5	5	1–3	3–1	—	4–2
4	(Switzerland) Xamax	6	0	1	5	7	17	−10	1	0–1	0–1	1–1	—

Source: mogiel.net
Rules for classification: 1) Points; 2) Goal difference; 3) Goals scored; 4) Head-to-head points; 5) Away goals scored; 6) Draw.

=== Group 3 ===
Pos	Team	Pld	W	D	L	GF	GA	GD	Pts	MAL	SLA	AWI	STE
1	(Sweden) Malmö FF	6	4	1	1	12	7	+5	9	—	3–2	4–1	3–0
2	(Czechoslovakia) Slavia Prague	6	3	0	3	12	8	+4	6	3–0	—	0–1	3–0
3	Austria Wien	6	2	1	3	6	12	−6	5	1–1	2–3	—	1–0
4	(France) Saint-Étienne	6	2	0	4	6	9	−3	4	0–1	2–1	4–0	—

Source: mogiel.net
Rules for classification: 1) Points; 2) Goal difference; 3) Goals scored; 4) Head-to-head points; 5) Away goals scored; 6) Draw.

=== Group 4 ===
Pos	Team	Pld	W	D	L	GF	GA	GD	Pts	STA	B05	DÜS	KB
1	(Belgium) Standard Liège	6	4	0	2	13	7	+6	8	—	3–0	4–1	3–1
2	(Czechoslovakia) Bohemians Prague	6	2	3	1	10	8	+2	7	3–1	—	4–1	1–1
3	(West Germany) Fortuna Düsseldorf	6	2	1	3	10	14	−4	5	0–1	1–1	—	4–3
4	(Denmark) KB	6	1	2	3	9	13	−4	4	2–1	1–1	1–3	—

Source: mogiel.net
Rules for classification: 1) Points; 2) Goal difference; 3) Goals scored; 4) Head-to-head points; 5) Away goals scored; 6) Draw.

=== Group 5 ===
Pos	Team	Pld	W	D	L	GF	GA	GD	Pts	SLO	KAI	GCZ	ÅTV
1	(Czechoslovakia) Slovan Bratislava	6	5	0	1	9	1	+8	10	—	1–0	4–0	1–0
2	(West Germany) Kaiserslautern	6	2	2	2	8	9	−1	6	1–0	—	3–3	1–0
3	(Switzerland) Grasshopper Club	6	2	1	3	9	12	−3	5	0–1	3–1	—	3–2
4	(Sweden) Åtvidaberg	6	1	1	4	5	9	−4	3	0–2	2–2	1–0	—

Source: mogiel.net
Rules for classification: 1) Points; 2) Goal difference; 3) Goals scored; 4) Head-to-head points; 5) Away goals scored; 6) Draw.

=== Group 6 ===
Pos	Team	Pld	W	D	L	GF	GA	GD	Pts	TRV	LNZ	WIS	AIK
1	(Czechoslovakia) Spartak Trnava	6	3	2	1	7	5	+2	8	—	2–1	0–0	2–1
2	(Austria) VÖEST Linz	6	3	1	2	13	7	+6	7	1–0	—	2–0	6–1
3	(Poland) Wisła Kraków	6	2	3	1	7	5	+2	7	2–2	1–1	—	1–0
4	(Sweden) AIK	6	1	0	5	5	15	−10	2	0–1	3–2	0–3	—

Source: mogiel.net
Rules for classification: 1) Points; 2) Goal difference; 3) Goals scored; 4) Head-to-head points; 5) Away goals scored; 6) Draw.

=== Group 7 ===
Pos	Team	Pld	W	D	L	GF	GA	GD	Pts	DUI	GÓR	WIN	HVI
1	(West Germany) Duisburg	6	4	1	1	24	10	+14	9	—	6–1	4–0	6–2
2	(Poland) Górnik Zabrze	6	2	2	2	14	17	−3	6	3–3	—	1–3	3–0
3	(Switzerland) Winterthur	6	2	1	3	11	15	−4	5	2–4	3–4	—	1–0
4	(Denmark) Hvidovre	6	1	2	3	8	15	−7	4	2–1	2–2	2–2	—

Source: mogiel.net
Rules for classification: 1) Points; 2) Goal difference; 3) Goals scored; 4) Head-to-head points; 5) Away goals scored; 6) Draw.

=== Group 8 ===
Pos	Team	Pld	W	D	L	GF	GA	GD	Pts	OST	LEG	VEJ	NOR
1	(Czechoslovakia) Baník Ostrava	6	3	3	0	8	3	+5	9	—	1–1	2–0	1–0
2	(Poland) Legia Warsaw	6	3	2	1	11	4	+7	8	1–1	—	2–0	2–0
3	(Denmark) Vejle	6	1	2	3	4	9	−5	4	0–0	0–4	—	1–1
4	(Sweden) Norrköping	6	1	1	4	4	11	−7	3	1–3	2–1	0–3	—

Source: mogiel.net
Rules for classification: 1) Points; 2) Goal difference; 3) Goals scored; 4) Head-to-head points; 5) Away goals scored; 6) Draw.

=== Group 9 ===
Pos	Team	Pld	W	D	L	GF	GA	GD	Pts	KOŠ	ŁKS	RFR	STU
1	(Czechoslovakia) Košice	6	4	2	0	21	6	+15	10	—	1–1	6–1	6–0
2	(Poland) ŁKS Łódź	6	2	2	2	8	13	−5	6	1–3	—	1–1	1–0
3	(Denmark) Randers Freja	6	2	1	3	12	11	+1	5	1–3	5–0	—	0–1
4	(Austria) Sturm Graz	6	1	1	4	6	17	−11	3	2–2	3–4	0–4	—

Source: mogiel.net
Rules for classification: 1) Points; 2) Goal difference; 3) Goals scored; 4) Head-to-head points; 5) Away goals scored; 6) Draw.

=== Group 10 ===
Pos	Team	Pld	W	D	L	GF	GA	GD	Pts	CUF	LAN	ALT	HAM
1	(Portugal) CUF	6	3	2	1	8	5	+3	8	—	1–0	2–0	1–0
2	(Sweden) Landskrona	6	2	3	1	9	5	+4	7	1–1	—	1–1	4–0
3	(Turkey) Altay	6	1	3	2	6	9	−3	5	2–1	1–1	—	2–2
4	(Sweden) Hammarby	6	1	2	3	7	11	−4	4	2–2	1–2	2–0	—

Source: mogiel.net
Rules for classification: 1) Points; 2) Goal difference; 3) Goals scored; 4) Head-to-head points; 5) Away goals scored; 6) Draw.

== See also ==
- 1974–75 European Cup
- 1974–75 UEFA Cup Winners' Cup
- 1974–75 UEFA Cup
