= 1975–76 Swiss Cup =

Tournament details
- Country: Switzerland

Final positions
- Champions: Zürich
- Runners-up: Servette

The 1975–76 Swiss Cup was the 51st season of Switzerland's annual football cup competition.

== Overview ==
The cup competition began on 8 June 1975, with the first games of the first round, but this round was not completed until 3 August. The entire competition was to be completed on Easter Monday 19 April 1976 with the final, which was held at the former Wankdorf Stadium in Bern. The clubs from this season's Nationalliga B (NLB) were granted byes for the first round. These entered the competition for the second round, played on the weekend of 9 and 10 of August. The clubs from this season's Nationalliga A (NLA) were granted byes for the first three rounds. These teams joined the competition in the fourth round on 27 and 28 September.

The matches were played in a knockout format. In the first two rounds, in the event of a draw at the end of extra time, the match was decided with a penalty shoot-out. In and after the third-round, in the event of a draw at the end of extra time, a replay was foreseen and this was played on the visiting team's pitch. The quarter- and semi-finals were played as two legged fixtures. This was to be the last year of this practice- From next season onwards these would again become one legged fixtures. The final, es ever, was held in one match. The winners of the competition qualified themselves for the first round of the Cup Winners' Cup in the next season.

== Round 1 ==
In this first phase, the lower league teams that had qualified themselves through the regional football associations took part in the competition. The draw respected local regionalities.

=== Summary ===
Team 1	Score	Team 2
8 June 1975
FC Plan-les-Ouates	2–6	Stade Nyonnais
FC Crissier	2–3	FC Assens
FC Ayent	4–2	FC Sierre
FC Fétigny	4–2	FC Stade Payerne
Marin-Sports	2–1	FC Saint-Imier
Moutier	0–4	US Boncourt
FC Aesch	1–0	SC Kleinhüningen
FC Stäfa ZH	0–2	FC Oerlikon ZH
FC Affoltern ZH	1–2 (a.e.t.)	Schaffhausen
FC Polizei ZH	0–4	Frauenfeld
FC Wollishofen ZH	4–2 (a.e.t.)	FC Altstetten (Zürich)
FC Küsnacht	1–4 (a.e.t.)	Emmenbrücke
15 June 1975
Etoile Espagnole GE	2–1	Meyrin
Concordia Lausanne	5–2	Montreux-Sports
FC Renens	6–2	Yverdon-Sport
FC Chalais	0–4	Monthey
FC Domdidier	1–10	Bulle
FC Portalban	1–5	Central Fribourg
FC Fontainemelon	2–1	FC Boudry
Bözingen 34	2–4	ASI Audax Neuchâtel
SC Derendingen	0–1	Dürrenast
FC Pratteln	1–3	Concordia
SC Schöftland	5–0	Baden
FC Adliswil	1–3	SC Zug
FC Küsnacht ZH	1–0	Blue Stars
FC Rüti ZH	2–3	Red Star
FC Wiedikon	0–1	FC Tössfeld
FC Rheineck	0–10	Gossau
FC Weinfelden	2–1	FC Uzwil
FC Bischofszell	2–5	Brühl
Winkeln St.Gallen	1–1 (a.e.t.) (4–5 p)	FC Wil
FC Muri AG	1–0	Buochs
Losone Sportiva	0–4	Locarno
Interstar GE	2–0	FC Onex
FC Steg	1–2	Naters
WEF Bern	4–2	Düdingen
FC Courrendlin	2–1	FC Selzach
FC Breitenbach	1–0	FC Birsfelden
FC Lachen	4–5 (a.e.t.)	Juventus Zürich
Balzers	2–1	FC Triesen (LIE)
FC Dottikon	3–0	FC Oltenese
Sparta Bern	1–0	Solothurn
22 June 1975
Echallens	3–0	CS Romont
Muttenz	0–2	Laufen
FC Herzogenbuchsee	3–0	FC Oftringen
FC Reiden	2–4	FC Turgi
FC Rapperswil	0–9	Young Fellows
Vaduz	3–2	Chur
FC Ibach	5–3	FC Brunnen
FC Baar	4–1	FC Ebikon
FC Morbio	4–3	Real Caneggio
2 July 1975
FC Interlaken	0–4	Bern
5 July 1975
FC Orbe	2–0	Stade Lausanne
Grünstern Ipsach	1–5	Le Locle-Sports
27 July 1975
FC Utzensdorf	1–5	Viktoria Bern
3 August 1975
FC Hochdorf	0–1	Kriens
Old Boys	2–1	Delémont
FC Bévilard	3–1	FC Porrentruy

== Round 2 ==
The teams from the NLB entered the cup competition in the second round, they were seeded and could not be drawn against each other. Whenever possible, the draw respected local regionalities. The lower-tier team in each drawn tie was granted the home advantage.

=== Summary ===
Team 1	Score	Team 2
9 August 1975
FC Echallens	3–6	Etoile Carouge
Marin-Sports	2–1	FC Bévilard
Sparta Bern	2–4	Central Fribourg
Dürrenast	1–2	Fribourg
FC Aesch	3–6	US Boncourt
Old Boys	1–2	Concordia
Laufen	3–2	Nordstern
FC Baar	1–6	Juventus Zürich
FC Muri AG	0–1	FC Tössfeld
FC Küsnacht ZH	1–2	Red Star
FC Dottikon	0–3	Young Fellows
FC Turgi	2–2 (a.e.t.) (p)	Aarau
Balzers	4–2	FC Wil
Vaduz	2–4	Brühl
FC Weinfelden	1–2	Gossau
FC Ibach	0–1	Mendrisiostar
FC Morbio	0–0 (a.e.t.) (7–6 p)	Locarno
Emmenbrücke	1–2	Chiasso
SC Zug	3–0	US Giubiasco
Kriens	1–0	Bellinzona
10 August 1975
Interstar GE	1–2	Vevey Sports
FC Assens	0–2	FC Orbe
Etoile Espagnole GE	2–6	Stade Nyonnais
Naters	3–0	Bulle
Concordia Lausanne	4–1	FC Renens
Monthey	1–2	Martigny-Sports
WEF Bern	3–2	FC Fontainemelon
FC Viktoria Bern	1–4 (a.e.t.)	Grenchen
ASI Audax Neuchâtel	2–0	Bern
FC Fétigny	4–1	Le Locle-Sports
FC Courrendlin	1–2	FC Breitenbach
FC Oerlikon ZH	3–1	Wettingen
FC Wollishofen ZH	0–8	Frauenfeld
FC Ayent	2–3	FC Raron
SC Schöftland	2–1	Schaffhausen
FC Herzogenbuchsee	0–4	Luzern

=== Matches ===
9 August 1975

FC Turgi	2–2 (a.e.t.)	Aarau
Goal	FCA summary	Goal

Sportanlage Oberau, Turgi

Aarau won on penalties.

== Round 3 ==
=== Summary ===
Team 1	Score	Team 2
30 August 1975
Balzers	3–2	FC Oerlikon ZH
Frauenfeld	1–0	FC Tössfeld
Kriens	1–2	SC Zug
US Boncourt	0–3	Grenchen
Laufen	6–0	Red Star
Martigny-Sports	0–2	FC Raron
Mendrisiostar	0–1	Chiasso
Central Fribourg	1–1	Fribourg
Aarau	2–3	SC Schöftland
31 August 1975
Concordia Lausanne	3–2 (a.e.t.)	Naters
Stade Nyonnais	4–0	Vevey Sports
FC Orbe	4–6	Etoile Carouge
WEF Bern	2–3	Marin-Sports
ASI Audax Neuchâtel	3–1	FC Fétigny
Brühl	4–4 (a.e.t.)	Juventus Zürich
FC Breitenbach	0–1	Concordia
FC Morbio	4–3	Luzern
Young Fellows	1–0	Gossau

Replays

Team 1	Score	Team 2
2 September 1975
Fribourg	5–1	Central Fribourg
10 September 1975
Juventus Zürich	1–0	Brühl

=== Matches ===
30 August 1975

Aarau	2–3	SC Schöftland
Goal	FCA summary	Goal

Stadion Brügglifeld, Aarau

== Round 4 ==
The teams from the NLA entered the cup competition in the fourth round, they were seeded and could not be drawn against each other. The draw was still respecting regionalities and the lower-tier team was again granted the home advantage.

=== Summary ===
Team 1	Score	Team 2
27 September 1975
Fribourg	4–0	Marin-Sports
Young Fellows	0–0 (a.e.t.)	Young Boys
Grenchen	0–2	Basel
Chiasso	0–1	Lugano
Etoile Carouge	1–3	Servette
Concordia Basel	0–1	Winterthur
FC Concordia Lausanne	0–3	Sion
FC Morbio	0–4	Grasshopper Club
28 September 1975
ASI Audax Neuchâtel	1–4	La Chaux-de-Fonds
Balzers	1–6	Frauenfeld
Juventus Zürich	3–4	St. Gallen
FC Raron	0–2	Lausanne-Sport
Stade Nyonnais	1–3	Chênois
SC Schöftland	0–2	Neuchâtel Xamax
Laufen	0–1	Biel-Bienne
SC Zug	0–2	Zürich

Replay

Team 1	Score	Team 2
8 October 1975
Young Boys	6–0	Young Fellows

=== Matches ===
27 September 1975

Young Fellows	0–0 (a.e.t.)	Young Boys
Zehnder (yellow card) 8'	YB summary	(yellow card) 89' Conz

Letzigrund, Zürich
Attendance: 1,000
Referee: (Switzerland) Attilio Bignasca (Lugano)

8 October 1975
Replay

Young Boys	6–0	Young Fellows
Conz 25' (1:0); Bruttin 41' (2:0); Siegenthaler 50' (3:0); Bruttin 54' (4:0); Odermatt 76' (5:0); Odermatt 84' (6:0)	YB summary

Wankdorf Stadium, Bern
Attendance: 5,000
Referee: (Switzerland) Othmar Winter

27 September 1975
20:00

Grenchen	0 – 2	Basel
Scheller (yellow card) 50'	Summary	17' (0:1) Nielsen; 74' (0:2) Muhmenthaler

Stadium Brühl, Grenchen
Attendance: 3,500
Referee: (Switzerland) Peter Kellenberger

27 September 1975

Etoile Carouge	1–3	Servette
Goal	Servette summary	Hussner; Wegmann; Riner

Stade de la Fontenette, Carouge

28 September 1975

SC Zug	0–2	Zürich
	FCZ summary	2' (0:1) Martinelli; 36' (0:2) Sanfilippo

Allmend Stadion, Zug
Attendance: 3,500
Referee: (Switzerland) Mario Osta (Oberuzwil)

== Round 5 ==
=== Summary ===
Team 1	Score	Team 2
29 October 1975
Frauenfeld	A–A	Zürich
Young Boys	3–1	Basel
Biel-Bienne	2–1	St. Gallen
Lugano	1–2	Fribourg
Winterthur	A–A	Sion
Grasshopper Club	3–3	La Chaux-de-Fonds
30 October 1975
Lausanne-Sport	A–A	Chênois
4 November 1975
Servette	2–1	Xamax

- All three games marked A–A were abandoned during play, due to fog.

Replays

Team 1	Score	Team 2
4 November 1975
Lausanne-Sport	1–0	Chênois
5 November 1975
Frauenfeld	0–2	Zürich
La Chaux-de-Fonds	0–0 (a.e.t.) (6–7 p)	Grasshopper Club
6 November 1975
Winterthur	1–4	Sion

=== Matches ===
29 October 1975
19:30

Young Boys	3–1	Basel
Odermatt 3' (1:0); Burkhardt 47' (2:0); Burkhardt 52' (3:0)	YB summary FCB summary	74' (3:1) Schönenberger

Wankdorf Stadium, Bern
Attendance: 23,000
Referee: (Switzerland) Walter Hungerbühler (St. Gallen)

4 November 1975

Servette	2–1	Xamax
Hussner; Bizzini	Servette summary	Goal

Stade des Charmilles, Geneva

5 November 1975

Frauenfeld	0–2	Zürich
Wolf (red card) 28'	FCZ summary	19' (0:1) Stierli; (yellow card) 25' Zigerlig; 58' (0:2) Katić

Kleine Allmend, Frauenfeld
Attendance: 4,300
Referee: (Switzerland) René Kellenberger (Herisau)

== Quarter-finals ==
=== Summary ===
The first legs were played on 16 November and the return legs were played on 7 December 1975.

Team 1	Agg.	Team 2	1st leg	2nd leg
Zürich	5–1	Young Boys	3–1	2–0
Fribourg	0–5	Servette	0–2	0–3
Sion	3–3 (a)	Grasshopper Club	2–2	1–1
Biel-Bienne	3–2	Lausanne-Sport	3–2	0–0 *

- [Protest from Biel-Bienne following a technical error by the referee, the goalless replay was held on 29 February 1976; the original score from 7 December had been: Lausanne-Sports–FC Biel-Bienne 4–1]

=== Matches ===
16 November 1975
First leg

Zürich	3–1	Young Boys
Rutschmann 15' (1:1); Risi 76' (pen.); Risi 80' (3:1)	FCZ summary YB summary	10' (0:1) Odermatt

Letzigrund, Zürich
Attendance: 11,500
Referee: (Switzerland) Mario Osta (Oberuzwil)

7 December 1975
Second leg

Young Boys	0–2	Zürich
Bruttin (yellow card) 27'	YB summary FCZ summary	(yellow card) 40' Zigerlig; (yellow card) 46' Rutschmann; 47' (0:1) Martinelli; 84' (0:2) Risi; (yellow card) 87' Pirmin Stierli

Wankdorf Stadium, Bern
Attendance: 20,000
Referee: (Switzerland) Roland Racine (Prilly)

16 November 1975
First leg

Fribourg	0–2	Servette
	Servette summary	(0:1) Canizares (0:2) Pfister

Stade Universitaire, Fribourg

7 December 1975
Second leg

Servette	3–0	Fribourg
Andrey (1:0); Andrey (2:0); Guyot (3:0)	Servette summary

Stade des Charmilles, Geneva

== Semi-finals ==
=== Summary ===
The first legs were played on 16 or 21 March and the return legs were played on 21 and 24 March 1976.

Team 1	Agg.	Team 2	1st leg	2nd leg
Biel-Bienne	3–7	Zürich	1–0	2–7
Servette	7–4	Grasshopper Club	6–2	1–2

=== Matches ===
16 March 1976

Biel-Bienne	1–0	Zürich
Jallonardo 75' (1:0)	FCZ summary

Stadion Gurzelen,
Attendance: 4,800
Referee: (Switzerland) Gottlieb Barmettler (Luzern)

21 March 1976

Zürich	7–2	Biel-Bienne
Katić 3' (1:0); Botteron 25' (2:0); Martinelli 49' (3:0); Scheiwiler 55' (4:0); Scheiwiler 60' (5:0); Scheiwiler 63' (6:0); Martinelli 80' (7:1)	summary	79' (6:1) Schwemmle; 85' (pen.) Schwemmle

Letzigrund, Zürich
Attendance: 8,500
Referee: (Switzerland) Attilio Bignasca (Lugano)

21 March 1976

Servette	6–2	Grasshopper Club
Andrey 7' (1:0); Andrey 18' (2:1); Pfister 44' (3:2); Bizzini 59' (4:2); Pfister 70' (5:2); Pfister 84' (6:2)	Servette summary	11' (1:1) Bosco; 23' (2:2) Elsener

Stade des Charmilles, Geneva

24 March 1976

Grasshopper Club	2–1	Servette
Christian Gross 35' (pen.); Bosco 46' (2:1)	Servette summary	38' (1:1) Schnyder

Hardturm, Zürich

== Final ==
The final was held at the former Wankdorf Stadium in Bern on Easter Monday 1976.

=== Summary ===
Team 1	Score	Team 2
1 19
Zürich	1–0	Servette

=== Telegram ===
19 April 1976
15:00

Zürich	1–0	Servette
Katić 9' (1:0); Rutschmann (yellow card) 26'; Risi (yellow card) 58'	Fussball-Schweiz summary	(yellow card) 36' Marchi

Wankdorf Stadium, Bern
Attendance: 46,000
Referee: (Switzerland) Jean Dubach (Nidau)

Zürich won the cup and this was the club's fifth cup title to this date and they were all achieved in the last eleven years. At the end of the 1975–76 Nationalliga A season, FCZ also won the Swiss championship and thus completed the domenstic double for the second time in the club's history. The Zurich team finished the league five points ahead of Servette and, with only one single defeat during the season (against Xamax), became only the second club in Swiss football history to win three consecutive championship titles. Consequently, the club were awarded the championship trophy to keep.

== Further in Swiss football ==
- 1975–76 Nationalliga A
- 1975–76 Swiss 1. Liga

== Sources ==
- Fussball-Schweiz
- 1975–76 at fcb-achiv.ch
- Switzerland 1975–76 at RSSSF

Preceded by 1974–75	Swiss Cup seasons	Succeeded by 1976–77
