= 1975 Intertoto Cup =

European football tournament

Tournament details
- Teams: 40

Final positions
- Champions: Group winners SSW Innsbruck; VÖEST Linz; Eintracht Braunschweig; Zagłębie Sosnowiec; Zbrojovka Brno; Rybnik; Åtvidaberg; Kaiserslautern; Belenenses; Čelik Zenica

Tournament statistics
- Matches played: 120

In the 1975 Intertoto Cup no knock-out rounds were contested, and therefore no overall winner was declared.

== Group stage ==
The teams were divided into ten groups of four teams each.

=== Group 1 ===
Pos	Team	Pld	W	D	L	GF	GA	GD	Pts	WAC	STA	MAL	SPA
1	(Austria) SSW Innsbruck	6	3	3	0	12	3	+9	9	—	1–1	1–0	6–0
2	(Belgium) Standard Liège	6	3	2	1	9	5	+4	8	1–1	—	4–1	2–0
3	(Sweden) Malmö FF	6	3	1	2	8	5	+3	7	0–0	2–0	—	2–0
4	(Netherlands) Sparta Rotterdam	6	0	0	6	1	17	−16	0	1–3	0–1	0–3	—

Source: mogiel.net
Rules for classification: 1) Points; 2) Goal difference; 3) Goals scored; 4) Head-to-head points; 5) Away goals scored; 6) Draw.

28 June 1975

SSW Innsbruck (Austria)	6-0	(Netherlands) Sparta Rotterdam
Werner Schwarz 11'; Rudolf Horvath 30' (pen.); Kurt Welzl 52', 84'; Franz Oberacher 66'; Bruno Pezzey 83'

Tivoli Stadion Tirol, Innsbruck
Attendance: 5,000
Referee: (Austria) Werner Spiegl

5 July 1975

Sparta Rotterdam (Netherlands)	0-3	(Sweden) Malmö FF
		Tommy Larsson 25'; Tore Cervin 63'; Thomas Sjöberg 75'

Het Kasteel, Rotterdam
Attendance: 2,500
Referee: (Netherlands) Henk Pijper

12 July 1975

Standard Liège (Belgium)	2-0	(Netherlands) Sparta Rotterdam
Ásgeir Sigurvinsson 12'; André Gorez 55'

Stade Maurice Dufrasne, Liège
Attendance: 7,000
Referee: (Belgium) Alfred Delcourt

19 July 1975

Malmö FF (Sweden)	2-0	(Netherlands) Sparta Rotterdam
Tore Cervin 32'; Bo Larsson 86'

Eleda Stadion, Malmö
Attendance: 4,150
Referee: (Sweden) Rolf Ericsson

26 July 1975

Sparta Rotterdam (Netherlands)	1-3	(Austria) SSW Innsbruck
Loek Bijl 52'		Bruno Pezzey 23'; Werner Kriess 28'; Günther Rinker 35'

Het Kasteel, Rotterdam
Attendance: 2,000
Referee: (Netherlands) Ben Hoppenbrouwer

2 August 1975

Sparta Rotterdam (Netherlands)	0-1	(Belgium) Standard Liège
		Paul Bajlitz 33'

Het Kasteel, Rotterdam
Attendance: 3,000
Referee: (Netherlands) Charles Corver

=== Group 2 ===
Pos	Team	Pld	W	D	L	GF	GA	GD	Pts	LNZ	BRA	B03	WIN
1	(Austria) VÖEST Linz	6	6	0	0	18	6	+12	12	—	2–1	3–0	4–2
2	(Czechoslovakia) Inter Bratislava	6	4	0	2	13	6	+7	8	0–2	—	2–0	4–0
3	(Denmark) B 1903	6	1	0	5	8	13	−5	2	3–4	1–3	—	4–0
4	(Switzerland) Winterthur	6	1	0	5	4	18	−14	2	0–3	1–3	1–0	—

Source: mogiel.net
Rules for classification: 1) Points; 2) Goal difference; 3) Goals scored; 4) Head-to-head points; 5) Away goals scored; 6) Draw.

=== Group 3 ===
Pos	Team	Pld	W	D	L	GF	GA	GD	Pts	EIN	VOJ	ZÜR	VEJ
1	(West Germany) Eintracht Braunschweig	6	4	0	2	13	5	+8	8	—	2–1	2–0	3–0
2	(Socialist Federal Republic of Yugoslavia) Vojvodina	6	3	1	2	14	8	+6	7	3–1	—	4–1	4–1
3	(Switzerland) Zürich	6	2	2	2	6	8	−2	6	1–0	0–0	—	2–2
4	(Denmark) Vejle	6	1	1	4	6	18	−12	3	0–5	2–2	0–2	—

Source: mogiel.net
Rules for classification: 1) Points; 2) Goal difference; 3) Goals scored; 4) Head-to-head points; 5) Away goals scored; 6) Draw.

28 June 1975
Matchday 1

Zürich (Switzerland)	2–2	(Denmark) Vejle
Scheiwiler 17' (1:0); Senn 64' (2:0)	FCZ summary	(yellow card) 75' Junker; 79' (2:1) Karl Aage Damsgaard; 89' (2:2 og) (Zigerlig)

Sportplatz Moos, Affoltern am Albis
Attendance: 1,500
Referee: (Switzerland) Roland Racine (Prilly)

5 July 1975
Matchday 2

Vojvodina (Socialist Federal Republic of Yugoslavia)	4–1	(Switzerland) Zürich
Vukašinović 8' (1:0); Srdanović 17' (2:0); Vučeković 75' (3:1); Vučeković 80' (4:1)	FCZ summary	44' (2:1) Katić

Novi Sad
Attendance: 3,000
Referee: (Socialist Federal Republic of Yugoslavia) Milivoje Gugulović

12 July 1975
17:00
Matchday 3

Zürich (Switzerland)	1–0	(West Germany) Eintracht Braunschweig
Risi 82' (1:0)	FCZ summary

Letzigrund, Zürich
Attendance: 2,500
Referee: (Switzerland) Ernst Dörflinger (Grenchen)

19 July 1975
Matchday 4

Zürich (Switzerland)	0–0	(Socialist Federal Republic of Yugoslavia) Vojvodina
Risi (yellow card)	FCZ summary	(yellow card) Jurčić

Letzigrund, Zürich
Attendance: 3,200
Referee: (Switzerland) André Favre (Echallens)

26 July 1975
Matchday 5

Vejle (Denmark)	0–2	(Switzerland) Zürich
	FCZ summary	18' (0:1) Botteron; 56' (0:2) Martinelli

Copenhagen
Attendance: 2,400
Referee: (Denmark) Kaj Rasmussen

29 July 1975
Matchday 6

Eintracht Braunschweig (West Germany)	2–0	(Switzerland) Zürich
Bründl 8' (1:0); Hollmann 66' (2:0)	FCZ summary

Braunschweig

=== Group 4 ===
Pos	Team	Pld	W	D	L	GF	GA	GD	Pts	ZSO	STU	TEL	HOL
1	(Poland) Zagłębie Sosnowiec	6	4	2	0	12	2	+10	10	—	6–0	1–0	2–1
2	(Austria) Sturm Graz	6	3	1	2	8	9	−1	7	1–1	—	2–0	2–0
3	(Netherlands) Telstar	6	2	1	3	5	8	−3	5	0–0	1–0	—	3–1
4	(Denmark) Holbæk	6	1	0	5	7	13	−6	2	0–2	1–3	4–1	—

Source: mogiel.net
Rules for classification: 1) Points; 2) Goal difference; 3) Goals scored; 4) Head-to-head points; 5) Away goals scored; 6) Draw.

=== Group 5 ===
Pos	Team	Pld	W	D	L	GF	GA	GD	Pts	ZBR	BYT	TBB	AIK
1	(Czechoslovakia) Zbrojovka Brno	6	5	0	1	15	6	+9	10	—	2–1	5–0	2–0
2	(Poland) Polonia Bytom	6	3	1	2	13	6	+7	7	1–2	—	3–0	5–1
3	(West Germany) Tennis Borussia Berlin	6	2	1	3	8	16	−8	5	3–2	1–1	—	1–3
4	(Sweden) AIK	6	1	0	5	7	15	−8	2	1–2	0–2	2–3	—

Source: mogiel.net
Rules for classification: 1) Points; 2) Goal difference; 3) Goals scored; 4) Head-to-head points; 5) Away goals scored; 6) Draw.

=== Group 6 ===
Pos	Team	Pld	W	D	L	GF	GA	GD	Pts	RYB	GCZ	AZ	ÖST
1	(Poland) ROW Rybnik	6	4	2	0	8	3	+5	10	—	1–0	2–2	2–1
2	(Switzerland) Grasshopper Club	6	3	0	3	13	12	+1	6	0–2	—	3–2	4–2
3	(Netherlands) AZ	6	2	2	2	8	8	0	6	0–0	3–1	—	1–0
4	(Sweden) Öster	6	1	0	5	7	13	−6	2	0–1	2–5	2–0	—

Source: mogiel.net
Rules for classification: 1) Points; 2) Goal difference; 3) Goals scored; 4) Head-to-head points; 5) Away goals scored; 6) Draw.

=== Group 7 ===
Pos	Team	Pld	W	D	L	GF	GA	GD	Pts	ÅTV	DUI	ŚLĄ	ADM
1	(Sweden) Åtvidaberg	6	3	1	2	8	4	+4	7	—	1–0	3–1	3–0
2	(West Germany) Duisburg	6	3	1	2	6	5	+1	7	1–0	—	2–1	2–1
3	(Poland) Śląsk Wrocław	6	2	1	3	7	7	0	5	1–0	0–0	—	3–0
4	(Austria) Admira/Wacker Wien	6	2	1	3	6	11	−5	5	1–1	2–1	2–1	—

Source: mogiel.net
Rules for classification: 1) Points; 2) Goal difference; 3) Goals scored; 4) Head-to-head points; 5) Away goals scored; 6) Draw.

=== Group 8 ===
Pos	Team	Pld	W	D	L	GF	GA	GD	Pts	KAI	B05	YB	GAIS
1	(West Germany) Kaiserslautern	6	5	0	1	19	6	+13	10	—	2–0	4–2	6–0
2	(Czechoslovakia) Bohemians Prague	6	5	0	1	9	6	+3	10	2–1	—	2–1	1–0
3	(Switzerland) Young Boys	6	1	0	5	9	15	−6	2	1–3	1–2	—	3–4
4	(Sweden) GAIS	6	1	0	5	6	16	−10	2	1–3	1–2	0–1	—

Source: mogiel.net
Rules for classification: 1) Points; 2) Goal difference; 3) Goals scored; 4) Head-to-head points; 5) Away goals scored; 6) Draw.

=== Group 9 ===
Pos	Team	Pld	W	D	L	GF	GA	GD	Pts	BEL	TRV	AMS	KB
1	(Portugal) Belenenses	6	4	2	0	8	4	+4	10	—	2–1	1–0	1–1
2	(Czechoslovakia) Spartak Trnava	6	3	2	1	17	7	+10	8	2–2	—	2–0	6–1
3	(Netherlands) Amsterdam	6	2	1	3	7	9	−2	5	0–1	1–1	—	5–4
4	(Denmark) KB	6	0	1	5	7	19	−12	1	0–1	1–5	0–1	—

Source: mogiel.net
Rules for classification: 1) Points; 2) Goal difference; 3) Goals scored; 4) Head-to-head points; 5) Away goals scored; 6) Draw.

=== Group 10 ===
Pos	Team	Pld	W	D	L	GF	GA	GD	Pts	ČEL	VIT	OST	ELF
1	(Socialist Federal Republic of Yugoslavia) Čelik Zenica	6	4	2	0	10	5	+5	10	—	1–1	2–1	2–0
2	(Portugal) Vitória Setúbal	6	2	2	2	6	6	0	6	1–2	—	2–1	1–0
3	(Czechoslovakia) Baník Ostrava	6	2	1	3	8	9	−1	5	1–1	1–0	—	3–1
4	(Sweden) Elfsborg	6	1	1	4	6	10	−4	3	1–2	1–1	3–1	—

Source: mogiel.net
Rules for classification: 1) Points; 2) Goal difference; 3) Goals scored; 4) Head-to-head points; 5) Away goals scored; 6) Draw.

== See also ==
- 1975–76 European Cup
- 1975–76 UEFA Cup Winners' Cup
- 1975–76 UEFA Cup
