= 1974–75 Nationalliga A =

Swiss football season

Nationalliga A
- Season: 1974–75
- Champions: Zürich
- Relegated: Luzern; Vevey-Sports
- Top goalscorer: Ilija Katić (Zürich); 23 goals

Nationalliga B
- Season: 1974–75
- Champions: Biel-Bienne
- Promoted: Biel-Bienne; La Chaux-de-Fonds
- Relegated: US Giubiasco; Mendrisiostar
- Top goalscorer: Heinz-Joachim Dries (La Chaux-de-Fonds); 24 goals

The following is the summary of the Swiss National League in the 1974–75 football season, both Nationalliga A and Nationalliga B. This was the 78th season of top-tier and the 77th season of second-tier football in Switzerland.

== Overview ==
The Swiss Football Association (ASF/SFV) had 28 member clubs at this time which were divided into two divisions of 14 teams each. The teams played a double round-robin to decide their table positions. Two points were awarded for a win and one point was awarded for a draw. The top tier (NLA) was contested by the top 12 teams from the previous 1973–74 season and the two newly promoted teams Luzern and Vevey-Sports. The champions would qualify for the 1975–76 European Cup. The second and third placed teams were qualified for the 1975–76 UEFA Cup. The last two placed teams were relegated.

The second-tier (NLB) was contested by the two teams that had been relegated La Chaux-de-Fonds and Chiasso, the teams that had been in third to twelfth position last season and the two newly promoted teams FC Raron and US Giubiasco. The top two teams would be promoted and the last two teams relegated. Because at the top of the table three teams ended the NLB level on points, in second position, a promotion play-off was required. Further, because at the bottom of the table three teams finished level on points, in second last position, a relegation play-out was also required.

== Nationalliga A ==
The first round of the NLA was played on 17 August 1974. There was a winter break between 17 November and 15 March 1975. The season was completed on 14 June 1976.

=== Teams, locations ===
Team	Town	Canton	Stadium	Capacity
FC Basel	Basel	Basel-Stadt	St. Jakob Stadium	36,800
CS Chênois	Thônex	Geneva	Stade des Trois-Chêne	8,000
Grasshopper Club Zürich	Zürich	Zürich	Hardturm	20,000
FC Lausanne-Sport	Lausanne	Vaud	Pontaise	15,700
FC Lugano	Lugano	Ticino	Cornaredo Stadium	6,330
FC Luzern	Lucerne	Lucerne	Stadion Allmend	25,000
Neuchâtel Xamax FC	Neuchâtel	Neuchâtel	Stade de la Maladière	25,500
FC St. Gallen	St. Gallen	St. Gallen	Espenmoos	11,000
Servette FC	Geneva	Geneva	Stade des Charmilles	27,000
FC Sion	Sion	Valais	Stade de Tourbillon	16,000
Vevey-Sports	Vevey	Vaud	Stade de Copet	4,000
FC Winterthur	Winterthur	Zürich	Schützenwiese	8,550
BSC Young Boys	Bern	Bern	Wankdorf Stadium	56,000
FC Zürich	Zürich	Zürich	Letzigrund	25,000

=== League table ===
Pos	Team	Pld	W	D	L	GF	GA	GD	Pts	Qualification
1	Zürich	26	19	1	6	63	19	+44	39	Swiss Champions, qualified for 1975–76 European Cup and entered 1975 Intertoto Cup
2	Young Boys	26	12	9	5	59	32	+27	33	Qualified for 1975–76 UEFA Cup and entered 1975 Intertoto Cup
3	Grasshopper Club	26	13	7	6	50	45	+5	33	Qualified for 1975–76 UEFA Cup and entered 1975 Intertoto Cup
4	Basel	26	11	9	6	49	33	+16	31	Swiss Cup winners, qualified for 1975–76 Cup Winners' Cup
5	FC Sion	26	12	7	7	45	30	+15	31	
6	Lausanne-Sport	26	10	9	7	40	35	+5	29	
7	Servette	26	10	7	9	43	35	+8	27	
8	Winterthur	26	9	8	9	36	31	+5	26	
9	Xamax	26	9	6	11	47	47	0	24	Entered 1975 Intertoto Cup
10	Lugano	26	8	6	12	34	40	−6	22	
11	Chênois	26	6	8	12	27	55	−28	20	
12	St. Gallen	26	6	8	12	42	72	−30	20	
13	Luzern	26	5	6	15	33	58	−25	16	Relegated to 1975–76 Nationalliga B
14	Vevey-Sports	26	3	7	16	31	67	−36	13	Relegated to 1975–76 Nationalliga B

Source: rsssf.com
Rules for classification: 1) Points; 2) Goal difference within the league, however with play-off for qualifiers;

=== Results ===
Home \ Away	BAS	CHÊ	GCZ	LS	LUG	LUZ	NX	SER	SIO	STG	VEV	YB	WIN	ZÜR
Basel		2–0	0–1	3–2	2–2	3–0	2–2	1–0	2–3	8–2	3–0	0–0	5–0	1–0
Chênois	1–1		2–2	1–1	1–1	2–4	2–0	1–3	1–1	1–4	1–1	0–0	0–1	2–1
Grasshopper Club	1–1	3–0		3–1	2–1	1–1	3–1	1–0	2–1	4–2	4–0	0–2	1–1	1–3
Lausanne-Sports	1–1	3–1	0–0		3–0	2–0	2–0	1–0	4–2	3–2	3–2	1–4	0–0	0–1
Lugano	2–0	0–1	1–3	3–0		2–2	1–3	2–1	1–0	0–2	2–2	1–0	0–0	3–1
Luzern	1–2	1–4	1–2	2–2	0–2		2–4	0–1	0–1	3–1	4–0	3–1	0–0	0–2
Neuchâtel Xamax	2–2	5–1	1–3	1–1	1–0	5–1		2–0	0–1	2–2	3–2	1–2	2–1	4–1
Servette	2–1	3–0	6–1	1–1	3–1	0–0	3–1		2–1	3–3	3–1	1–1	1–1	0–3
Sion	1–1	1–1	4–1	0–0	4–2	5–0	3–2	6–5		3–0	2–0	0–0	2–0	1–0
St. Gallen	2–0	1–2	2–2	2–2	1–2	3–0	1–1	1–1	3–2		0–0	0–7	3–2	1–5
Vevey-Sports	1–2	1–2	3–7	1–4	2–1	2–2	4–2	1–1	1–1	2–2		2–1	1–4	0–4
Young Boys	4–4	2–0	6–1	2–1	2–1	5–3	1–1	0–3	0–0	9–0	5–2		1–1	2–2
Winterthur	2–0	8–0	1–1	1–2	3–3	1–2	3–1	1–0	1–0	3–2	1–0	0–1		0–1
Zürich	1–2	5–0	4–0	2–0	1–0	5–1	3–0	3–0	1–0	5–0	3–0	4–1	2–0	

Legend: Blue = home team win; Yellow = draw; Red = away team win.

=== Top goalscorers ===
Rank	Player	Club	Goals
1	(Socialist Federal Republic of Yugoslavia) Ilija Katić	FC Zurich	23
2	(Switzerland) Hans-Jörg Pfister	Servette	17
2	(Socialist Federal Republic of Yugoslavia) Slobodan Santrač	Grasshopper Club	17
2	(Switzerland) Hanspeter Schild	BSC Young Boys	17
5	(Italy) Franco Cucinotta	FC Sion	14
6	(Germany) Ottmar Hitzfeld	FC Basel	13
7	(Switzerland) Guy Mathez	Neuchâtel Xamax	12
7	(Switzerland) Peter Risi	FC Winterthur	12
9	(Italy) Rosario Martinelli	FC Zurich	11
9	(Switzerland) Daniel Jeandupeux	FC Zurich	11
9	(Switzerland) Anton Schaller	FC Luzern	11
9	(Switzerland) Claudio Sulser	Vevey-Sports	11
13	(Sweden) Ove Grahn	Grasshopper Club	10

== Nationalliga B ==
The first round of the NLB was played on 17 August 1974. There was a winter break between 17 November and 15 March 1975. The season was completed on 14 June 1976.

=== Teams, locations ===
Team	Town	Canton	Stadium	Capacity
FC Aarau	Aarau	Aargau	Stadion Brügglifeld	9,240
AC Bellinzona	Bellinzona	Ticino	Stadio Comunale Bellinzona	5,000
FC Biel-Bienne	Biel/Bienne	Bern	Stadion Gurzelen	15,000
FC Chiasso	Chiasso	Ticino	Stadio Comunale Riva IV	4,000
Étoile Carouge FC	Carouge	Geneva	Stade de la Fontenette	3,690
FC Fribourg	Fribourg	Fribourg	Stade Universitaire	9,000
US Giubiasco	Ticino	Campo Semine	1,000	
FC Grenchen	Grenchen	Solothurn	Stadium Brühl	15,100
FC La Chaux-de-Fonds	La Chaux-de-Fonds	Neuchâtel	Centre Sportif de la Charrière	12,700
FC Martigny-Sports	Martigny	Valais	Stade d'Octodure	2,500
Mendrisiostar	Mendrisio	Ticino	Centro Sportivo Comunale	4,000
FC Nordstern Basel	Basel	Basel-Stadt	Rankhof	7,600
FC Raron	Raron	Valais	Sportplatz Rhoneglut	1,000
FC Wettingen	Wettingen	Aargau	Stadion Altenburg	10,000

=== League table ===
Pos	Team	Pld	W	D	L	GF	GA	GD	Pts	Qualification or relegation
1	FC Biel-Bienne	26	14	6	6	57	31	+26	34	NLA Champions and promoted to 1975–76 Nationalliga A
2	FC La Chaux-de-Fonds	26	13	6	7	60	35	+25	32	To play-off for promotion
3	FC Chiasso	26	14	4	8	45	29	+16	32	To play-off for promotion
4	FC Nordstern Basel	26	13	6	7	48	38	+10	32	To play-off for promotion
5	Etoile Carouge FC	26	14	3	9	56	34	+22	31	
6	AC Bellinzona	26	12	7	7	47	30	+17	31	
7	FC Fribourg	26	13	5	8	38	33	+5	31	
8	FC Grenchen	26	12	4	10	36	36	0	28	
9	FC Aarau	26	10	5	11	42	45	−3	25	
10	FC Martigny-Sports	26	8	5	13	41	53	−12	21	
11	FC Wettingen	26	7	4	15	37	55	−18	18	To relegation play-out
12	Mendrisiostar	26	5	8	13	18	38	−20	18	To relegation play-out
13	FC Raron	26	4	10	12	19	40	−21	18	To relegation play-out
14	US Giubiasco	26	4	5	17	23	70	−47	13	Relegated to 1975–76 1. Liga

Source: rsssf.com
Rules for classification: 1) Points; 2) Goal difference within the league, however with play-off for qualifiers;

=== Promotion play-off ===
Because at the top of the table three teams ended the NLB level on points, in second position, a promotion play-off was required. These games took place on neutral grounds on 21, 25 and 28 June.

Pos	Team	Pld	W	D	L	GF	GA	GD	Pts	Qualification	CdF	NOR	CHI
1	FC La Chaux-de-Fonds	2	2	0	0	6	3	+3	4	promoted to 1975–76 Nationalliga A	—	3–2	—
2	FC Nordstern Basel	2	0	1	1	3	4	−1	1		—	—	1–1
3	FC Chiasso	2	0	1	1	2	4	−2	1		1–3	—	—

Source: rsssf.com
Rules for classification: 1) Points; 2) Goal difference; 3) Goals scored; 4) Head-to-head points; 5) Away goals scored; 6) Draw.

=== Relegation play-out ===
Because at the bottom of the table three teams finished level on points, in second last position, a relegation play-out was also required. These games took place on neutral grounds on 21, 25 and 28 June.

Pos	Team	Pld	W	D	L	GF	GA	GD	Pts	Qualification	RAR	WET	MEN
1	FC Raron	1	1	0	0	1	0	+1	2		—	—	1–0
2	FC Wettingen	1	0	1	0	2	2	0	1		n/p	—	—
3	Mendrisiostar	2	0	1	1	2	3	−1	1	Relegated to 1975–76 1. Liga	—	2–2	—

Source: rsssf.com
Rules for classification: 1) Points; 2) Goal difference; 3) Goals scored; 4) Head-to-head points; 5) Away goals scored; 6) Draw.

Raron-Wettingen was not played (Mendrisiostar withdrew)

== Further in Swiss football ==
- 1974–75 Swiss Cup
- 1974–75 Swiss 1. Liga

== Sources ==
- Switzerland 1974–75 at RSSSF

Preceded by 1973–74	Nationalliga seasons in Switzerland	Succeeded by 1975–76
