= Hans Niggl =

Swiss sprinter

Personal information
- Nationality: Swiss
- Born: 1908
- Died: 9 January 1943 (aged 34–35)

Sport
- Sport: Sprinting
- Event: 200 metres

Hans Niggl (1908 – 9 January 1943) was a Swiss sprinter. He competed in the men's 200 metres at the 1928 Summer Olympics.
