= Peter Marti =

Swiss footballer (1952–2023)

Personal information
- Date of birth: 12 July 1952
- Place of birth: Langenthal, Switzerland
- Date of death: 23 March 2023 (aged 70)
- Position: Forward

Youth career
- –1969: FC Langenthal
- 1969–1970: Young Boys

Senior career*
Years	Team	Apps	(Gls)
1970–1972	Young Boys	46	(6)
1973–1975	FC Zürich	34	(3)
1975–1981	FC Basel	123	(39)
1981–1982	FC Aarau	19	(3)
1982–1983	FC Basel	23	(6)
1983–1985	FC Aarau	41	(1)

International career
1971–1980	Switzerland	6	(0)
- * Club domestic league appearances and goals

Peter Marti (12 July 1952 – 23 March 2023) was a Swiss footballer who played as a forward during the 1970s and 1980s.

== Career ==
=== Early years ===
Born in Langenthal, in addition to playing his youth soccer with the local amateur football club, Marti also played ice hockey with SC Langenthal, and he made it to youth internationals in both sports. When he finally had to decide between the two, it is said that he had to flip a coin. After making his decision, Marti moved to the youth department of the Young Boys in 1969, advancing to their first team a year later. Across all competitions, league, Cup and UIC, he had 57 appearances, scoring seven goals.

=== Zürich ===
During the 1972–73 season, he signed for FC Zürich, this as the up-and-coming FCZ under German trainer Timo Konietzka lured him with a multi-year contract. Marti played his domestic league debut for his new team in the home game in the Letzigrund on 20 October 1972 as FCZ won 4–0 against Grenchen. In the 1972–73 Cupfinal Marti scored the first goal as Zürich beat Basel 2–0 after extra time. At the end of the season Marti had made 21 appearances, 15 in the league and six in the Cup.

At the end of the 1973–74 season and again at the end of the 1974–75 season, Marti won the championship with FCZ, where as his playing time in his third season with the team diminished markedly and, therefore, he moved on. During his time with the club, Marti had 61 appearances, 34 in the league, 15 in the domestic Cup and 12 at international level (European Cup and UIC) scoring in total nine goals.

=== Basel ===
In the summer of 1975, Marti transferred to FC Basel under head coach Helmut Benthaus. After playing in two test games, Marti played his debut for the club in the UIC as Basel won 4–3 in the away game against Stade de Reims on 19 July. He scored his first goal for his new team in the away game in the League Cup. In fact, he netted the team's third and fourth goals as they won 4–1 against St. Gallen. In the next round he scored the teams first and last goals, as FCB won 8–1 away against Young Fellows Zürich and in the quarter-final he scored a hat-trick, as they won 6–2 against Grenchen.

In his first season with Basel, they ended in the season in third position, but in the 1976–77 season they won the national championship after ending level in points with Servette, but winning the play-off. He stayed with the club for six years, winning the league title again in the 1979–80 season. Basel won the championship in the last matchday of the season, away against Marti's former club Zürich and he scored one of the goals as Basel won 4–1.

=== Aarau ===
In the 1982–83 season Marti played for newly promoted FC Aarau and they ended the league season in seventh position, well away from the relegation zone. With Aarau, in that season, Marti won the League Cup, winning the two-legged final 1–0 on aggregate against St. Gallen.

=== Basel ===
Marti then returned to play for Basel for the 1982–83 season, but at the end of the season, he decided to move on definitively. Between the years from 1975 to 1981 and again 1982–83 he played a total of 286 games for Basel, scoring a total of 88 goals. 46 of these games were in the domestic league, 15 in the Swiss Cup, 13 in the League Cup, 29 in the UEFA competitions (European Cup, European Cup Winners' Cup, UEFA Cup, and Cup of the Alps) and 65 were friendly games. He scored 45 goals in the domestic league, three in the Swiss Cup, 11 in the League Cup, five in the European games and the other 24 were scored during the test games.

=== Aarau ===
In summer 1983, Marti signed for FC Aarau under head coach Zvezdan Čebinac. The following season, under new and up-coming head coach Ottmar Hitzfeld the team won the Swiss Cup for the first and only time in the club's history. Marti retired from his football career in 1985.

=== National team ===
The striker also made it into the Swiss national team. Aged just 19, he made his debut in a friendly against Turkey. In total, he completed six games in the dress of the national team.

== Personal life ==
After his football career, the father of two adult children ran a cleaning company from Pfeffingen with his life partner, Beatrice Straumann. Marti died on 23 March 2023, at the age of 70. His heart had caused problems for the ex-footballer before, he suffered several heart attacks.

== Honours ==
Zürich

- Swiss Super League: 1973–74, 1974–75
- Swiss Cup: 1973

Basel

- Swiss Super League: 1976–77, 1979–80
- Uhrencup: 1978, 1979, 1980

Aarau

- Swiss League Cup: 1981–82
- Swiss Cup: 1984–85

== Sources ==
- Die ersten 125 Jahre. Publisher: Josef Zindel im Friedrich Reinhardt Verlag, Basel. ISBN 978-3-7245-2305-5
- Portrait of Peter Marti on FCB site
- Verein "Basler Fussballarchiv" Homepage
