= Ove Grahn =

Swedish footballer (1943–2007)

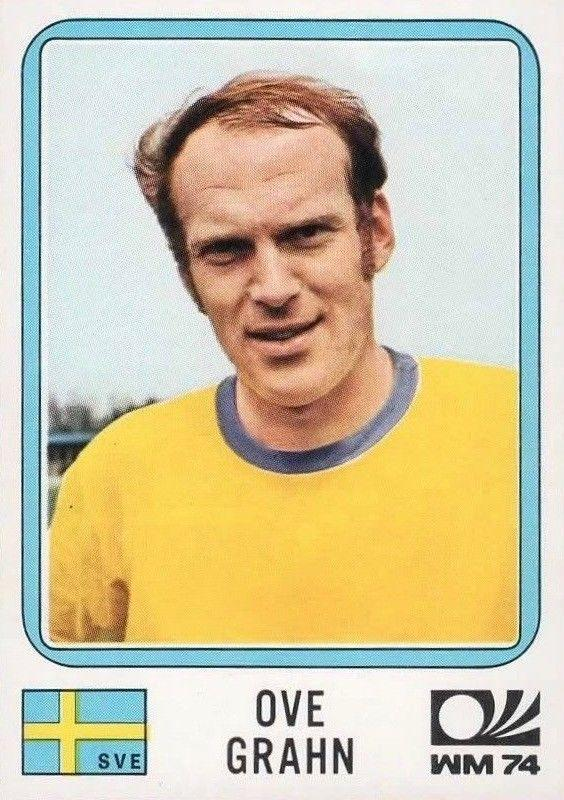
- Grahn in the 1974 FIFA World Cup

Personal information
- Full name: Jan-Olof Grahn
- Date of birth: 9 May 1943
- Place of birth: Norra Fågelås, Sweden
- Date of death: 11 July 2007 (aged 64)
- Place of death: Alingsås, Sweden
- Height: 1.80 m (5 ft 11 in)
- Position: Striker

Youth career
- –1960: Norra Fågelås IF

Senior career*
Years	Team	Apps	(Gls)
1960	Norra Fågelås IF	14	(40)
1961–1965	IF Elfsborg	91	(53)
1966–1971	Grasshoppers	133	(70)
1971–1973	Lausanne Sports	52	(31)
1973–1976	Grasshoppers	59	(20)
1976–1978	Örgryte IS	37	(3)
Total		386	(217)

International career
1961	Sweden U19	3	(7)
1964–1965	Sweden U21	6	(1)
1962–1965	Sweden B	5	(7)
1962–1976	Sweden	45	(10)
- * Club domestic league appearances and goals

Jan-Olof "Ove" Grahn (9 May 1943 – 11 July 2007) was a Swedish professional football player who played as a striker. He represented IF Elfsborg, Grasshoppers, Lausanne Sports, and Örgryte IS during a career that spanned between 1960 and 1978. A full international between 1962 and 1976, he won 45 caps and scored 10 goals for the Sweden national team and represented his country at the 1970 and 1974 FIFA World Cups.

== Club career ==
Grahn began his career with Norra Fågelås IF in Division 4, where he scored 40 goals in 14 games during the 1960 season at only 17 years of age. He then signed for IF Elfsborg in Allsvenskan and played in four games as they won the 1961 Allsvenskan title. He then went on to play professionally in Switzerland for 10 years before finishing up his career at Örgryte IS.

== International career ==
Between 1962 and 1976, Grahn played 45 international games for Sweden, and represented his country at the 1970 and 1974 FIFA World Cups, where he scored the winning goal against Uruguay in the former. He also represented the Sweden U19, U21, and B teams between 1961 and 1965.

== Career statistics ==
=== International ===
Appearances and goals by national team and year
National team	Year	Apps	Goals
Sweden	1962	2	1
Sweden	1963	0	0
Sweden	1964	0	0
Sweden	1965	3	0
Sweden	1966	0	0
Sweden	1967	0	0
Sweden	1968	3	1
Sweden	1969	6	2
Sweden	1970	4	1
Sweden	1971	3	2
Sweden	1972	2	0
Sweden	1973	6	1
Sweden	1974	9	0
Sweden	1975	4	2
Sweden	1976	3	0
Total		45	10

Scores and results list Sweden's goal tally first, score column indicates score after each Grahn goal.

List of international goals scored by Ove Grahn
No.	Date	Venue	Opponent	Score	Result	Competition	Ref.
1	19 June 1962	Helsinki Olympic Stadium, Helsinki, Finland	Finland	1–0	3–0	1960–63 Nordic Football Championship	
2	1 August 1968	Ullevi, Gothenburg, Sweden	Soviet Union	2–1	2–2	Friendly	
3	19 June 1969	Ullevaal Stadion, Oslo, Norway	Norway	4–0	5–2	1970 FIFA World Cup qualification	
4	24 September 1969	Råsunda Stadium, Solna, Sweden	Hungary	2–0	2–0	Friendly	
5	10 June 1970	Estadio Cuahtemoc, Puebla City, Mexico	Uruguay	1–0	1–0	1970 FIFA World Cup	
6	20 June 1971	Parken, Copenhagen, Denmark	Denmark	1–0	3–1	1968–71 Nordic Football Championship	
7	20 June 1971	Parken, Copenhagen, Denmark	Denmark	3–1	3–1	1968–71 Nordic Football Championship	
8	23 May 1973	Ullevi, Gothenburg, Sweden	Austria	2–1	3–2	1974 FIFA World Cup qualification	
9	19 May 1975	Örjans Vall, Halmstad, Sweden	Algeria	2–1	2–1	Friendly	
10	30 June 1975	Råsunda Stadium, Solna, Sweden	Norway	3–1	3–1	UEFA Euro 1976 qualification	

== Honours ==
Elfsborg

- Allsvenskan: 1961

Grasshoppers

- Nationalliga A: 1970–71
- Swiss League Cup: 1974–75

Individual

- Division 4 top scorer: 1960
- Stor Grabb: 1968
- Nationalliga A top scorer: 1973 (shared with Ottmar Hidzfeld)
