= 1973–74 Nationalliga A =

Swiss football season

Nationalliga A
- Season: 1973–74
- Champions: Zürich
- Relegated: La Chaux-de-Fonds; Chiasso
- Top goalscorer: Daniel Jeandupeux (Zürich); 22 goals

Nationalliga B
- Season: 1973–74
- Champions: Luzern
- Promoted: Luzern; Vevey-Sports
- Relegated: Young Fellows; FC Tössfeld
- Top goalscorer: Pierre-Albert Waeber (FC Grenchen); 19 goals

The following is the summary of the Swiss National League in the 1973–74 football season, both Nationalliga A and Nationalliga B. This was the 77th season of top-tier and the 76th season of second-tier football in Switzerland.

== Overview ==
The Swiss Football Association (ASF/SFV) had 28 member clubs at this time which were divided into two divisions of 14 teams each. The teams played a double round-robin to decide their table positions. Two points were awarded for a win, and one point was awarded for a draw. The top tier (NLA) was contested by the top 12 teams from the previous 1972–73 season and the two newly promoted teams Xamax and Chênois. The champions would qualify for the 1974–75 European Cup. The second and third placed teams were qualified for the 1974–75 UEFA Cup. The last two placed teams were relegated.

The second-tier (NLB) was contested by the two teams that had been relegated from the NLA, FC Grenchen and FC Fribourg, the teams that had been in third to twelfth position last season and the two newly promoted teams FC Nordstern Basel and FC Tössfeld. The top two teams would be promoted and the last two teams relegated.

== Nationalliga A ==
The first round of the NLA was played on 18 August 1973. There was a winter break between 9 December and 2 March 1974. The season was completed on 1 June 1974.

=== Teams, locations ===
Team	Town	Canton	Stadium	Capacity
FC Basel	Basel	Basel-Stadt	St. Jakob Stadium	36,800
CS Chênois	Thônex	Geneva	Stade des Trois-Chêne	8,000
FC Chiasso	Chiasso	Ticino	Stadio Comunale Riva IV	4,000
Grasshopper Club Zürich	Zürich	Zürich	Hardturm	20,000
FC La Chaux-de-Fonds	La Chaux-de-Fonds	Neuchâtel	Centre Sportif de la Charrière	12,700
FC Lausanne-Sport	Lausanne	Vaud	Pontaise	15,700
FC Luzern	Lucerne	Lucerne	Stadion Allmend	25,000
Neuchâtel Xamax FC	Neuchâtel	Neuchâtel	Stade de la Maladière	25,500
FC St. Gallen	St. Gallen	St. Gallen	Espenmoos	11,000
Servette FC	Geneva	Geneva	Stade des Charmilles	27,000
FC Sion	Sion	Valais	Stade de Tourbillon	16,000
FC Winterthur	Winterthur	Zürich	Schützenwiese	8,550
BSC Young Boys	Bern	Bern	Wankdorf Stadium	56,000
FC Zürich	Zürich	Zürich	Letzigrund	25,000

=== Final league table ===
Pos	Team	Pld	W	D	L	GF	GA	GD	Pts	Qualification
1	Zürich	26	20	5	1	67	20	+47	45	Champions, qualified for 1974–75 European Cup and entered 1974 Intertoto Cup
2	Grasshopper Club	26	12	9	5	41	27	+14	33	Qualified for 1974–75 UEFA Cup and entered 1974 Intertoto Cup
3	Servette	26	12	8	6	49	35	+14	32	Qualified for 1974–75 UEFA Cup
4	Winterthur	26	13	6	7	42	29	+13	32	Entered 1974 Intertoto Cup
5	Basel	26	13	3	10	57	39	+18	29	
6	Young Boys	26	10	8	8	52	38	+14	28	
7	Xamax	26	10	6	10	38	38	0	26	Entered 1974 Intertoto Cup
8	Lausanne-Sport	26	9	8	9	45	48	−3	26	
9	St. Gallen	26	10	5	11	38	48	−10	25	
10	Sion	26	5	12	9	24	31	−7	22	Swiss Cup winners, qualified for 1974–75 Cup Winners' Cup
11	Chênois	26	7	8	11	30	48	−18	22	
12	Lugano	26	4	9	13	20	44	−24	17	
13	La Chaux-de-Fonds	26	3	10	13	28	51	−23	16	Relegated to 1974–75 Nationalliga B
14	Chiasso	26	2	7	17	18	53	−35	11	Relegated to 1974–75 Nationalliga B

Source: rsssf.com
Rules for classification: 1) Points; 2) Goal difference within the league, however with play-off for qualifiers;

=== Results ===
Home \ Away	BAS	CDF	CHÊ	CHI	GCZ	LS	LUG	NX	SER	SIO	STG	WIN	ZÜR	YB
Basel		4–2	6–0	3–1	1–3	8–2	3–0	1–2	5–1	1–0	1–1	1–0	1–3	2–3
La Chaux-de-Fonds	0–2		2–2	0–2	1–3	2–2	0–0	1–1	2–2	1–0	2–4	0–0	0–2	3–1
Chênois	0–1	1–0		4–0	0–0	1–2	3–1	3–1	0–2	0–0	1–1	2–2	0–2	2–2
Chiasso	1–1	0–0	0–1		0–0	1–1	0–2	0–3	0–0	1–3	3–1	1–2	0–1	0–3
Grasshopper Club	2–1	2–0	5–2	2–1		2–2	2–0	3–2	3–1	2–1	1–1	2–0	1–1	0–2
Lausanne-Sports	2–0	3–2	1–1	2–0	2–0		3–0	1–0	4–2	2–2	5–0	0–2	1–3	2–4
Lugano	0–0	1–1	1–3	1–1	0–0	2–0		0–0	0–0	4–0	2–3	0–1	1–2	0–0
Neuchâtel Xamax	0–5	0–0	5–0	2–1	0–0	4–0	5–0		0–3	2–0	3–1	2–1	1–3	0–3
Servette	2–3	3–2	3–1	7–1	2–2	3–2	4–0	3–1		1–0	1–0	1–1	0–1	3–2
Sion	1–2	1–1	1–1	2–2	0–0	1–1	2–0	3–0	0–0		0–0	0–0	2–1	1–1
St. Gallen	2–1	2–0	1–0	4–1	3–2	2–1	5–1	1–1	1–3	0–1		0–4	2–3	3–1
Winterthur	3–2	1–3	5–1	1–0	0–4	1–1	1–3	3–0	2–0	4–0	1–0		1–1	2–1
Zürich	5–1	8–1	4–0	5–1	1–0	4–2	4–0	1–1	1–1	1–0	3–0	2–1		3–0
Young Boys	3–1	4–2	0–1	2–0	3–0	1–1	1–1	1–2	1–1	3–3	6–0	2–3	2–2	

Source: rsssf.com
Legend: Blue = home team win; Yellow = draw; Red = away team win.

=== Top goalscorers ===
Rank	Player	Club	Goals
1	(Switzerland) Daniel Jeandupeux	Zurich	22
2	(Switzerland) Walter Müller	Lausanne-Sport	21
3	(Germany) Ottmar Hitzfeld	Basel	19
4	(Switzerland) Peter Risi	Winterthur	17
5	(Serbia) Ilija Katić	Zurich	16
5	(Serbia) Miodrag Petrović	Servette	16
7	(Switzerland) Jean-Michel Elsig	Xamax	15
8	(Switzerland) Rolf Blättler	St. Gallen	12
9	(Switzerland) Marcel Cornioley	Young Boys	10
9	(Switzerland) Serge Muhmenthaler	Young Boys	10
9	(Switzerland) Adolf Noventa	Grasshopper Club	10
9	(Switzerland) Hansjörg Pfister	Servette	10

== Nationalliga B ==
=== Teams, locations ===
Team	Town	Canton	Stadium	Capacity
FC Aarau	Aarau	Aargau	Stadion Brügglifeld	9,240
AC Bellinzona	Bellinzona	Ticino	Stadio Comunale Bellinzona	5,000
FC Biel-Bienne	Biel/Bienne	Bern	Stadion Gurzelen	15,000
Étoile Carouge FC	Carouge	Geneva	Stade de la Fontenette	3,690
FC Fribourg	Fribourg	Fribourg	Stade Universitaire	9,000
FC Grenchen	Grenchen	Solothurn	Stadium Brühl	15,100
FC Luzern	Lucerne	Lucerne	Stadion Allmend	25,000
FC Martigny-Sports	Martigny	Valais	Stade d'Octodure	2,500
Mendrisiostar	Mendrisio	Ticino	Centro Sportivo Comunale	4,000
FC Nordstern Basel	Basel	Basel-Stadt	Rankhof	7,600
FC Tössfeld	Winterthur	Zürich	Talgut	1,000
Vevey-Sports	Vevey	Vaud	Stade de Copet	4,000
FC Wettingen	Wettingen	Aargau	Stadion Altenburg	10,000
FC Young Fellows Zürich	Zürich	Zürich	Utogrund	2,850

=== League table ===
Pos	Team	Pld	W	D	L	GF	GA	GD	Pts	Qualification
1	Luzern	26	16	6	4	60	24	+36	38	NLB Champions and promoted to 1974–75 Nationalliga A
2	Vevey Sports	26	15	7	4	48	28	+20	37	Promoted to 1974–75 Nationalliga A
3	FC Grenchen	26	14	8	4	59	47	+12	36	
4	FC Aarau	26	9	10	7	34	29	+5	28	
5	FC Nordstern Basel	26	9	9	8	37	36	+1	27	
6	AC Bellinzona	26	10	7	9	41	44	−3	27	
7	FC Wettingen	26	8	10	8	49	42	+7	26	
8	FC Fribourg	26	10	5	11	36	32	+4	25	
9	FC Biel-Bienne	26	7	11	8	33	37	−4	25	
10	FC Martigny-Sports	26	7	8	11	24	35	−11	22	
11	Mendrisiostar	26	6	10	10	28	41	−13	22	
12	Etoile Carouge FC	26	7	7	12	30	38	−8	21	
13	FC Young Fellows Zürich	26	7	4	15	41	54	−13	18	Relegated to 1974–75 1. Liga
14	FC Tössfeld	26	3	6	17	23	56	−33	12	Relegated to 1974–75 1. Liga

Source: rsssf.com
Rules for classification: 1) Points; 2) Goal difference within the league, however with play-off for qualifiers;

== Attendances ==
#	Football club	Average attendance
1	FC Zürich	11,015
2	FC Basel	10,923
3	Xamax	8,392
4	Servette FC	8,138
5	FC St. Gallen	6,300
6	BSC Young Boys	6,154
7	Lausanne-Sport	5,662
8	Grasshopper Club Zürich	5,523
9	FC Sion	5,500
10	FC Winterthur	5,077
11	CS Chênois	3,877
12	FC La Chaux-de-Fonds	3,162
13	FC Lugano	2,762
14	FC Chiasso	2,562

== Further in Swiss football ==
- 1973 Swiss League Cup
- 1973–74 Swiss Cup
- 1973–74 Swiss 1. Liga

== Sources ==
- Switzerland 1973–74 at RSSSF

Preceded by 1972–73	Nationalliga seasons in Switzerland	Succeeded by 1974–75
