= Rosario Martinelli =

Italian footballer and manager

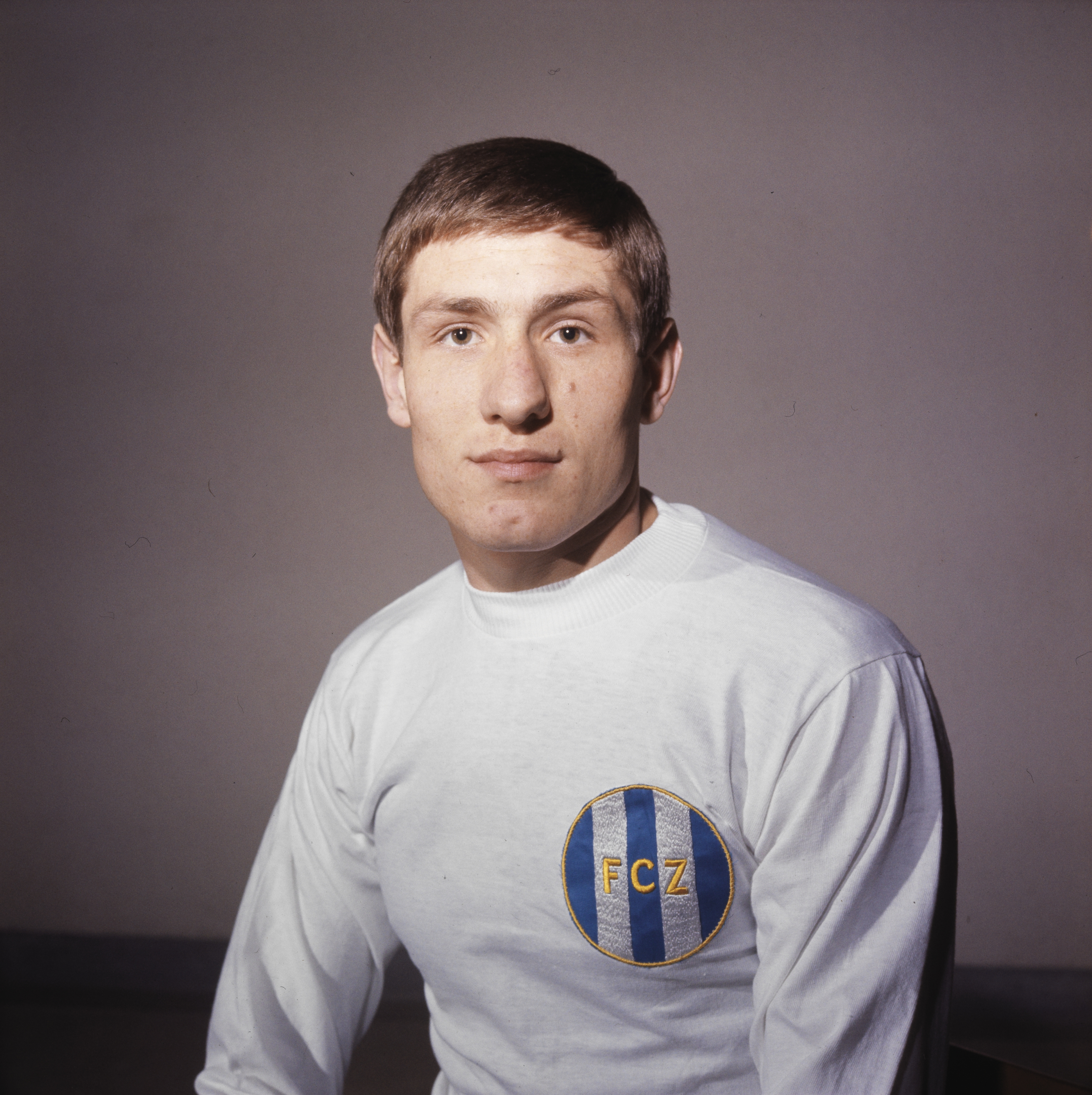
- Rosario Martinelli in 1963

Personal information
- Full name: Rosario Martinelli
- Date of birth: 11 October 1941
- Place of birth: Gazzaniga, Italy
- Date of death: 19 October 2013 (aged 72)
- Place of death: Ticino, Switzerland
- Height: 1.83 m (6 ft 0 in)
- Position: Midfielder

Youth career
- 1958–1960: FC Wetzikon
- 1960–1961: Zürich

Senior career*
| Years | Team | Apps | (Gls) |
| 1961–1976 | Zürich | 344 | (126) |
| 1976–1977 | Chiasso | 14 | (3) |

Managerial career
- 1980: Zürich (assistant)
- * Club domestic league appearances and goals as of 5 August 2017 ‡ National team caps and goals as of 5 August 2017

Rosario Martinelli (11 October 1941 – 19 October 2013) was an Italian professional football player who played as a midfielder.

Martinelli has won 6 Swiss Super League and 5 Swiss Cups. He arrived in Zürich at the age of 17, and was known for his all-round play and technical ability.

== Honours ==
Zürich

- Swiss Super League: 1962–63, 1965–66, 1967–68, 1973–74, 1974–75, 1975–76
- Swiss Cup: 1965–66, 1969–70, 1971–72, 1972–73, 1975–76
