= Ernst Rutschmann =

Swiss footballer (born 1948)

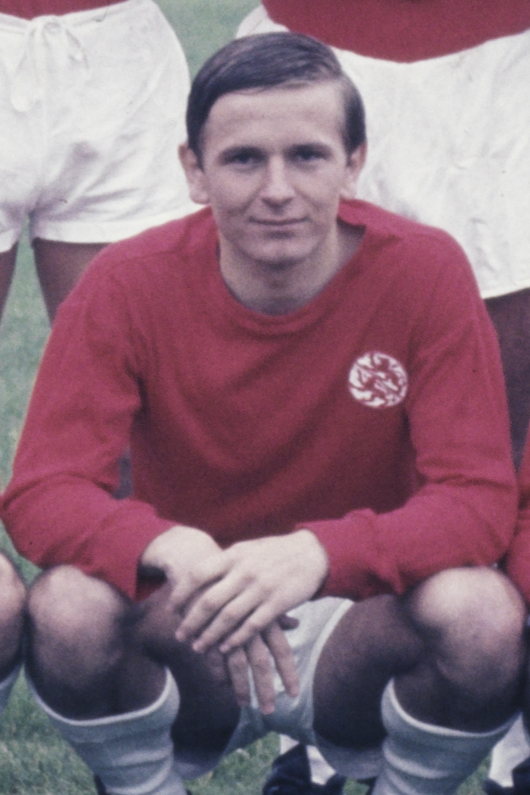
- Rutschmann in 1967

Personal information
- Date of birth: 9 November 1948 (age 77)
- Place of birth: Winterthur, Switzerland
- Position: Midfielder

Senior career*
Years	Team	Apps	(Gls)
1967–1971	FC Winterthur		
1971–1977	FC Zürich	118	(26)
1977–1978	FC Gossau		
1978–1979	FC Wettingen		

International career
1970–1975	Switzerland	8	(0)
- * Club domestic league appearances and goals

Ernst Rutschmann (born 9 November 1948) is a former Swiss football player. During his career he played for FC Winterthur, FC Zürich, FC Gossau and FC Wettingen.

He made 8 appearances for the Switzerland national team between 1970 and 1975.

== Honours ==
=== Club ===
FC Zürich

- Swiss Super League (3): 1973–74, 1974–75, 1975–76
- Swiss Cup (3) 1971–72, 1972–73, 1975–76
