= 1975–76 Nationalliga A =

Swiss football season

Nationalliga A
- Season: 1975–76
- Champions: Zürich
- Relegated: Lugano; La Chaux-de-Fonds; Biel-Bienne
- European Cup: Zürich
- Cup Winners' Cup: Servette
- UEFA Cup: Basel; Grasshopper Club
- Top goalscorer: Peter Risi (Zürich); 33 goals

Nationalliga B
- Season: 1975–76
- Champions: Bellinzona
- Promoted: Bellinzona
- Relegated: FC Martigny-Sports; FC Wettingen
- Top goalscorer: Herluf Bang (Bellinzona); 17 goals

The following is the summary of the Swiss National League in the 1975–76 football season, both Nationalliga A and Nationalliga B. This was the 79th season of top-tier and the 78th season of second-tier football in Switzerland.

== Overview ==
The Swiss Football Association (ASF/SFV) had 28 member clubs at this time which were divided into two divisions of 14 teams each. The teams played a double round-robin to decide their table positions. Two points were awarded for a win and one point was awarded for a draw. The top tier (NLA) was contested by the top 12 teams from the previous 1974–75 season and the two newly promoted teams Biel-Bienne and La Chaux-de-Fonds. The champions would qualify for the 1975–76 European Cup. The second and third placed teams were to have qualified for UEFA Cup, but because Zürich won the double, cup runners-up Servette advanced to the 1976–77 Cup Winners' Cup and the third and forth placed teams advanced to the 1975–76 UEFA Cup.

There was to be a reform of the Swiss football league system at the end of this season. The number of teams in the top tier (NLA) was to be reduced from 14 to 12 and the second-tier (NLB) would increase from 14 to 16 teams. Therefore, this season would see three teams relegated from the NLA and only one team promoted from the NLB. Lugano and the two newly promoted teams, Biel-Bienne and La Chaux-de-Fonds, suffered relegation. Because two teams ended the NLB level on points, a promotion play-off was required. Bellinzona won this play-off against Luzern to achieve promotion.

== Nationalliga A ==
The first round of the NLA was played on 16 August 1975. There was a winter break between 30 November and 7 March 1976. The season was completed on 12 June 1976.

=== Teams, locations ===
Team	Town	Canton	Stadium	Capacity
FC Basel	Basel	Basel-Stadt	St. Jakob Stadium	36,800
FC Biel-Bienne	Biel/Bienne	Bern	Stadion Gurzelen	15,000
CS Chênois	Thônex	Geneva	Stade des Trois-Chêne	8,000
Grasshopper Club Zürich	Zürich	Zürich	Hardturm	20,000
FC La Chaux-de-Fonds	La Chaux-de-Fonds	Neuchâtel	Centre Sportif de la Charrière	12,700
FC Lausanne-Sport	Lausanne	Vaud	Pontaise	15,700
FC Lugano	Lugano	Ticino	Cornaredo Stadium	6,330
Neuchâtel Xamax FC	Neuchâtel	Neuchâtel	Stade de la Maladière	25,500
FC St. Gallen	St. Gallen	St. Gallen	Espenmoos	11,000
Servette FC	Geneva	Geneva	Stade des Charmilles	27,000
FC Sion	Sion	Valais	Stade de Tourbillon	16,000
FC Winterthur	Winterthur	Zürich	Schützenwiese	8,550
BSC Young Boys	Bern	Bern	Wankdorf Stadium	56,000
FC Zürich	Zürich	Zürich	Letzigrund	25,000

=== Final league table ===
Pos	Team	Pld	W	D	L	GF	GA	GD	Pts	Qualification or relegation
1	Zürich	26	19	6	1	69	26	+43	44	Swiss champions, qualified for 1976–77 European Cup and Swiss Cup winners, entered 1976 Intertoto Cup
2	Servette	26	16	7	3	50	14	+36	39	Swiss Cup runners-up, qualified for 1976–77 Cup Winners' Cup
3	Basel	26	13	8	5	59	38	+21	34	qualified for 1976–77 UEFA Cup
4	Grasshopper Club	26	14	4	8	54	37	+17	32	qualified for 1976–77 UEFA Cup and entered 1976 Intertoto Cup
5	Young Boys	26	11	9	6	41	27	+14	31	entered 1976 Intertoto Cup
6	Xamax	26	11	8	7	37	25	+12	30	
7	St. Gallen	26	8	11	7	41	39	+2	27	entered 1976 Intertoto Cup
8	Lausanne-Sport	26	10	6	10	35	39	−4	26	
9	Sion	26	6	9	11	40	54	−14	21	
10	Chênois	26	5	9	12	30	42	−12	19	
11	Winterthur	26	8	2	16	34	65	−31	18	
12	Lugano	26	5	6	15	19	37	−18	16	Relegated to Nationalliga B
13	La Chaux-de-Fonds	26	5	4	17	27	61	−34	14	Relegated to Nationalliga B
14	Biel-Bienne	26	5	3	18	26	58	−32	13	Relegated to Nationalliga B

Source: rsssf.com
Rules for classification: 1) Points; 2) Goal difference within the league, however with play-off for qualifiers;

=== Results ===
Home \ Away	BAS	BB	CDF	CHÊ	GCZ	LS	LUG	NX	SER	SIO	STG	YB	WIN	ZÜR
Basel		3–1	5–2	3–0	5–1	1–2	3–0	0–0	2–0	1–1	2–2	5–1	5–1	1–1
Biel-Bienne	1–5		2–0	2–1	2–7	0–2	1–0	0–2	0–3	1–1	2–2	3–2	0–1	1–3
La Chaux-de-Fonds	1–2	2–0		1–1	2–5	1–2	1–0	0–1	0–3	2–3	2–1	2–1	4–3	0–2
Chênois	1–3	3–0	2–1		2–1	3–3	0–0	0–0	0–1	2–0	1–1	0–0	5–1	3–5
Grasshopper Club	4–1	2–0	4–1	2–0		1–1	2–0	0–0	3–2	2–3	1–1	2–1	3–0	1–2
Lausanne-Sports	0–1	3–2	0–0	4–0	1–3		3–2	1–0	2–2	1–1	2–0	0–0	0–1	0–3
Lugano	1–1	0–2	2–1	2–0	0–1	0–1		0–1	0–2	1–0	1–2	0–0	3–1	1–2
Neuchâtel Xamax	2–2	3–1	0–0	2–1	4–1	3–0	0–1		0–0	3–0	3–1	1–1	3–1	4–1
Servette	3–0	1–0	4–0	3–1	2–0	2–1	1–0	5–0		3–0	3–0	0–0	3–1	0–0
Sion	5–1	1–0	2–2	2–2	1–2	0–2	2–2	2–1	1–1		2–2	2–2	2–3	2–3
St. Gallen	2–2	3–0	2–1	1–0	2–2	3–2	2–2	1–0	0–0	7–2		1–1	4–0	0–1
Young Boys	3–1	0–0	3–0	1–1	2–1	3–0	4–0	1–0	2–1	3–0	4–0		1–0	0–2
Winterthur	2–3	3–2	3–1	1–1	1–3	2–1	0–0	3–2	1–5	0–3	2–0	2–4		0–2
Zürich	1–1	5–3	8–0	2–0	1–0	5–1	4–1	2–2	0–0	5–2	1–1	3–1	5–1	

Source: rsssf.com
Legend: Blue = home team win; Yellow = draw; Red = away team win.

== Nationalliga B ==
=== Teams, locations ===
Team	Town	Canton	Stadium	Capacity
FC Aarau	Aarau	Aargau	Stadion Brügglifeld	9,240
AC Bellinzona	Bellinzona	Ticino	Stadio Comunale Bellinzona	5,000
FC Chiasso	Chiasso	Ticino	Stadio Comunale Riva IV	4,000
Étoile Carouge FC	Carouge	Geneva	Stade de la Fontenette	3,690
FC Fribourg	Fribourg	Fribourg	Stade Universitaire	9,000
FC Gossau	Gossau	St. Gallen	Sportanlage Buechenwald	3,500
FC Grenchen	Grenchen	Solothurn	Stadium Brühl	15,100
FC Luzern	Lucerne	Lucerne	Stadion Allmend	25,000
FC Martigny-Sports	Martigny	Valais	Stade d'Octodure	2,500
FC Nordstern Basel	Basel	Basel-Stadt	Rankhof	7,600
FC Raron	Raron	Valais	Sportplatz Rhoneglut	1,000
Vevey-Sports	Vevey	Vaud	Stade de Copet	4,000
FC Wettingen	Wettingen	Aargau	Stadion Altenburg	10,000
FC Young Fellows Zürich	Zürich	Zürich	Utogrund	2,850

=== Final league table ===
Pos	Team	Pld	W	D	L	GF	GA	GD	Pts	Qualification or relegation
1	AC Bellinzona	26	14	7	5	47	29	+18	35	To play-off for promotion
2	Luzern	26	15	5	6	61	35	+26	35	To play-off for promotion
3	Etoile Carouge FC	26	13	6	7	48	42	+6	32	
4	FC Nordstern Basel	26	10	7	9	58	44	+14	27	
5	Vevey Sports	26	8	10	8	47	47	0	26	
6	FC Fribourg	26	10	5	11	47	40	+7	25	
7	FC Grenchen	26	10	5	11	58	53	+5	25	
8	FC Gossau	26	10	5	11	40	40	0	25	
9	FC Young Fellows Zürich	26	9	6	11	31	43	−12	24	
10	FC Aarau	26	8	7	11	35	38	−3	23	
11	FC Chiasso	26	8	7	11	36	40	−4	23	
12	FC Raron	26	10	3	13	29	52	−23	23	
13	FC Martigny-Sports	26	6	10	10	27	47	−20	22	Relegated to 1976–77 1. Liga
14	FC Wettingen	26	5	9	12	33	47	−14	19	Relegated to 1976–77 1. Liga

Source: rsssf.com
Rules for classification: 1) Points; 2) Goal difference within the league, however with play-off for qualifiers;

=== Play-off for promotion ===
15 June 1976

Bellinzona	1–0	Luzern
Edoardo Manzoni 44'	summary

Letzigrund, Zürich
Referee: (Switzerland)

== Further in Swiss football ==
- 1975–76 Swiss Cup
- 1975–76 Swiss 1. Liga

== Sources ==
- Switzerland 1975–76 at RSSSF

Preceded by 1974–75	Nationalliga seasons in Switzerland	Succeeded by 1976–77
