= Ilija Katić =

Serbian footballer (born 1945)

Personal information
- Date of birth: 20 July 1945 (age 81)
- Place of birth: Donji Hasić, Yugoslavia
- Position: Striker

Senior career*
Years	Team	Apps	(Gls)
–1962	NK Mladost Hasić		
1962–1964	Borac Bos. Šamac		
1964–1967	Slavonija Osijek		
1968–1973	Partizan	133	(29)
1973–1976	FC Zürich	75	(50)
1976–1977	Burgos	31	(4)
1977–1978	Neuchâtel Xamax	9	(2)
1979–1980	La Chaux-de-Fonds	19	(1)

International career
1968–1969	Yugoslavia	4	(0)

Managerial career
- 1978–1980: La Chaux-de-Fonds
Medal record
Men's Football
Representing Yugoslavia
Mediterranean Games
Gold medal – first place	1971 Izmir	Team competition
- * Club domestic league appearances and goals

Ilija Katić (Serbian Cyrillic: Илија Катић; born 20 July 1945) is a former professional football player and coach.

== Club career ==
Katić began playing with his home-town club NK Mladost D Hasić. In 1962 he joined FK Borac Šamac where he stayed two seasons. He joined NK Osijek in 1964, named NK Slavonija back then, and played in the Yugoslav Second League. In 1967, he moved to giants FK Partizan where stayed until 1973 and became a national team player.

In 1973, he moved abroad and joined Swiss side FC Zürich where he played the next three seasons. In 1976, he played one season in Spain with La Liga side Burgos CF and later returned to Switzerland and played in top league sides Neuchâtel Xamax and FC La Chaux-de-Fonds. He finished his career in Liechtenstein and became a coach.

== International career ==
Katić played four matches for the Yugoslavia national team in 1968 and 1969.

== Honours ==
FC Zürich

- Swiss Super League: 1973–74, 1974–75, 1975–76
- Swiss Cup: 1975–76

Individual

- Swiss Super League Best Foreign Player (2): 1974–75, 1975–76
- Swiss Super League top scorer: 1974–75 (23 goals)
