= Stade de Copet =

Coordinates: 46.4692°N 6.8472°E

Stade de Copet is a multi-use stadium in Vevey, Switzerland. It holds approximately 4,000 spectators and is primarily used as a venue for football matches.
