= 1973–74 in Swiss football =

Football in Switzerland
- Season: 1973–74

Men's football
- Nationalliga A: Zürich
- Nationalliga B: Luzern
- 1. Liga: 1. Liga champions: FC Raron; Group West: FC Bulle; Group Cenral: FC Solothurn; Group South and East: FC Gossau
- 1973–74 Swiss Cup: Sion
- 1973 Swiss League Cup: Grasshopper Club

Women's football
- Swiss Women's Super League: DFC Aarau

The following is a summary of the 1973–74 season of competitive football in Switzerland.

== Nationalliga A ==
=== League table ===
Pos	Team	Pld	W	D	L	GF	GA	GD	Pts	Qualification
1	Zürich	26	20	5	1	67	20	+47	45	Champions, qualified for 1974–75 European Cup and entered 1974 Intertoto Cup
2	Grasshopper Club	26	12	9	5	41	27	+14	33	Qualified for 1974–75 UEFA Cup and entered 1974 Intertoto Cup
3	Servette	26	12	8	6	49	35	+14	32	Qualified for 1974–75 UEFA Cup
4	Winterthur	26	13	6	7	42	29	+13	32	Entered 1974 Intertoto Cup
5	Basel	26	13	3	10	57	39	+18	29	
6	Young Boys	26	10	8	8	52	38	+14	28	
7	Xamax	26	10	6	10	38	38	0	26	Entered 1974 Intertoto Cup
8	Lausanne-Sport	26	9	8	9	45	48	−3	26	
9	St. Gallen	26	10	5	11	38	48	−10	25	
10	Sion	26	5	12	9	24	31	−7	22	Swiss Cup winners, qualified for 1974–75 Cup Winners' Cup
11	Chênois	26	7	8	11	30	48	−18	22	
12	Lugano	26	4	9	13	20	44	−24	17	
13	La Chaux-de-Fonds	26	3	10	13	28	51	−23	16	Relegated to 1974–75 Nationalliga B
14	Chiasso	26	2	7	17	18	53	−35	11	Relegated to 1974–75 Nationalliga B

Source: rsssf.com
Rules for classification: 1) Points; 2) Goal difference within the league, however with play-off for qualifiers;

== Nationalliga B ==
=== League table ===
Pos	Team	Pld	W	D	L	GF	GA	GD	Pts	Qualification
1	Luzern	26	16	6	4	60	24	+36	38	NLB Champions and promoted to 1974–75 Nationalliga A
2	Vevey Sports	26	15	7	4	48	28	+20	37	Promoted to 1974–75 Nationalliga A
3	FC Grenchen	26	14	8	4	59	47	+12	36	
4	FC Aarau	26	9	10	7	34	29	+5	28	
5	FC Nordstern Basel	26	9	9	8	37	36	+1	27	
6	AC Bellinzona	26	10	7	9	41	44	−3	27	
7	FC Wettingen	26	8	10	8	49	42	+7	26	
8	FC Fribourg	26	10	5	11	36	32	+4	25	
9	FC Biel-Bienne	26	7	11	8	33	37	−4	25	
10	FC Martigny-Sports	26	7	8	11	24	35	−11	22	
11	Mendrisiostar	26	6	10	10	28	41	−13	22	
12	Etoile Carouge FC	26	7	7	12	30	38	−8	21	
13	FC Young Fellows Zürich	26	7	4	15	41	54	−13	18	Relegated to 1974–75 1. Liga
14	FC Tössfeld	26	3	6	17	23	56	−33	12	Relegated to 1974–75 1. Liga

Source: rsssf.com
Rules for classification: 1) Points; 2) Goal difference within the league, however with play-off for qualifiers;

== 1. Liga ==
=== Group West ===
Pos	Team	Pld	W	D	L	GF	GA	GD	Pts	Qualification or relegation
1	FC Bulle	24	14	6	4	53	32	+21	34	Play-off to Nationalliga B
2	FC Raron	24	14	4	6	39	20	+19	32	Play-off to Nationalliga B
3	FC Monthey	24	12	4	8	37	24	+13	28	
4	FC Dürrenast	24	9	8	7	45	43	+2	26	
5	FC Stade Nyonnais	24	9	8	7	36	39	−3	26	
6	FC Le Locle	24	9	7	8	48	35	+13	25	
7	ASI Audax-Friul	24	9	6	9	45	51	−6	24	
8	FC Sierre	24	8	7	9	33	42	−9	23	
9	FC Meyrin	24	8	6	10	33	33	0	22	
10	Central Fribourg	24	9	4	11	38	42	−4	22	
11	Yverdon-Sport FC	24	8	5	11	26	27	−1	21	Play-out against relegation
12	FC Thun	24	7	7	10	38	46	−8	21	Play-out against relegation
13	Urania Genève Sport	24	2	4	18	28	65	−37	8	Relegation to 2. Liga Interregional

Source: RSSSF
Rules for classification: 1) Points; 2) Goal difference within the league, but decider play-off for qualifiers; 3) Goals scored; 4) Head-to-head points; 5) Away goals scored; 6) Draw.

==== Decider for eleventh place ====
The decider was played on 1 June in Solothurn.

Team 1	Score	Team 2
Yverdon-Sport FC	3–2	FC Thun

Yverdon-Sport FC win and remain in division. FC Thun are relegated directly to 2. Liga Interregional.

=== Group Cenral ===
Pos	Team	Pld	W	D	L	GF	GA	GD	Pts	Qualification or relegation
1	FC Solothurn	24	14	5	5	37	21	+16	33	Play-off to Nationalliga B
2	FC Brunnen	24	13	6	5	51	32	+19	32	Play-off to Nationalliga B
3	FC Emmenbrücke	24	13	4	7	54	34	+20	30	
4	SR Delémont	24	11	7	6	36	20	+16	29	
5	FC Concordia Basel	24	9	7	8	33	36	−3	25	
6	FC Laufen	24	9	5	10	33	37	−4	23	
7	FC Porrentruy	24	8	7	9	32	43	−11	23	
8	SC Zug	24	7	8	9	31	33	−2	22	
9	SC Buochs	24	8	5	11	37	39	−2	21	
10	FC Bern	24	10	1	13	45	48	−3	21	
11	SC Kriens	24	6	9	9	34	41	−7	21	
12	FC Moutier	24	3	10	11	26	44	−18	16	Relegation to 2. Liga Interregional
13	FC Deitingen	24	6	4	14	40	61	−21	16	Relegation to 2. Liga Interregional

Source: RSSSF
Rules for classification: 1) Points; 2) Goal difference within the league, but decider play-off for qualifiers; 3) Goals scored; 4) Head-to-head points; 5) Away goals scored; 6) Draw.

=== Group South and East ===
Pos	Team	Pld	W	D	L	GF	GA	GD	Pts	Qualification or relegation
1	FC Gossau	24	15	6	3	54	28	+26	36	Play-off to Nationalliga B
2	US Giubiasco	24	12	10	2	32	21	+11	34	Play-off to Nationalliga B
3	FC Frauenfeld	24	13	6	5	51	27	+24	32	
4	FC Baden	24	13	6	5	39	20	+19	32	
5	FC Chur	24	13	6	5	47	30	+17	32	
6	SC Brühl	24	11	4	9	38	44	−6	26	
7	FC Uzwil	24	10	5	9	37	38	−1	25	
8	FC Blue Stars Zürich	24	8	7	9	41	38	+3	23	
9	FC Locarno	24	7	6	11	30	31	−1	20	
10	FC Schaffhausen	24	6	8	10	29	37	−8	20	
11	FC Red Star Zürich	24	4	7	13	25	54	−29	15	
12	FC Rapid Lugano	24	1	7	16	10	40	−30	9	Relegation to 2. Liga Interregional
13	FC Rorschach	24	4	0	20	31	56	−25	8	Relegation to 2. Liga Interregional

Source: RSSSF
Rules for classification: 1) Points; 2) Goal difference within the league, but decider play-off for qualifiers; 3) Goals scored; 4) Head-to-head points; 5) Away goals scored; 6) Draw.

=== Promotion play-off ===
The three group winners played a two legged tie against one of the runners-up to decide the three finalists. The games were played on 1 and 8 June.

==== First round ====
Team 1	Score	Team 2
FC Brunnen	2–1	FC Bulle
FC Bulle	0–0	FC Brunnen

FC Brunnen win 2–1 on aggregate and continue to the finals.

Team 1	Score	Team 2
FC Gossau	0–0	FC Raron
FC Raron	2–0	FC Gossau

FC Raron win 2–0 on aggregate and continue to the finals.

Team 1	Score	Team 2
FC Solothurn	1–1	US Giubiasco
US Giubiasco	1–1	FC Solothurn

2–2 on aggregate. Giubiasco qualified as best classed in the regular season and continue to the finals.

==== Final round ====
Pos	Team	Pld	W	D	L	GF	GA	GD	Pts	Qualification	RAR	GIU	BRN
1	FC Raron	2	1	0	1	3	1	+2	2	Promoted to Nationalliga B	—	—	3–0
2	US Giubiasco	2	1	0	1	2	2	0	2	Promoted to Nationalliga B	1–0	—	—
3	FC Brunnen	2	1	0	1	2	4	−2	2		—	2–1	—

Source: RSSSF

FC Raron are 1. Liga champions, US Giubiasco are runners-up and these two teams are promoted.

== Swiss Cup ==
The competition was played in a knockout system. In the case of a draw, extra time was played. If the teams were still level after extra time, the match was replayed at the away team's ground. In case of a draw after extra time, the replay was to be decided with a penalty shoot-out. The Quarter- and Semi-finals were played as two legged rounds, home and away. The final was held in Bern.

=== Early rounds ===
The routes of the finalists to the final were:

- Third round: NLA teams with a bye.
- Fourth round: Bulle Sion 1:4. Martigny Xamax 0:6.
- Fifth round: Sion Servette 3:0. Xamax Chiasso 2:0.
- Quarter-finals: First leg: Sion Basel 1:0. Return leg: Basel Sion 2:2 (agg. 2:3). First leg: Xamax Chênois 5:1. Return leg: Chênois Xamax 0:2 (agg. 1:7).
- Semi-finals: First leg: Sion Lausanne 0:0. Return leg: Lausanne Sion 1:1 (agg 1:1, Sion won on away goals). First leg: Xamax GC 0:0. Return leg: GC Xamax 1:1 (agg. 1:1, Xamax won on away goals).

=== Final ===
Easter Monday 15 April 1974

Sion	3–2	Xamax
Luttrop 7' (pen.); Barberis 14'; Pillet 43'	Summary	84' Elsig; 87' Mathez

Wankdorf Stadium, Bern
Attendance: 30,000
Referee: (Switzerland) Hans Wieland (Grenchen)

== Swiss League Cup ==
The 1973 League Cup was played as a pre-season tournament. In the first round the best eight placed teams from the previous league season had a bye, the other 20 league teams participated, playing a two legged round. The best eight winners qualified for the second round. The remainder of the tournament was a played in single-elimination. In the case of a draw, extra time was played. If the teams were still level after extra time, the decision was brought about with a penalty shoot-out. The final took place on 10 October 1973 at Letzigrund in Zürich.

=== Early rounds ===
The routes of the finalists to the final were:

- First round: GC bye. Winterthur bye.
- Second round: Zürich-GC 1:1 (a.e.t.) 3:4 (p). Winterthur-Luzern 1:0.
- Quarter-finals: Vevey-GC 1:4. St. Gallen-Winterthur 1:2.
- Semi-finals: GC-Servette 2:0. Biel-Bienne-Winterthur 1:3.

=== Final ===
10 October 1973

Grasshopper Club	2–2 aet (a.e.t.)	Winterthur
Elsener 71'; Ohlhauser 76'	Summary	25', 66' Risi
Penalties
Penalty scored	5–4	Penalty scored Penalty missed

Letzigrund, Zürich
Attendance: 3,700
Referee: (Switzerland) Anton Bucheli (Lucerne)

== Swiss Clubs in Europe ==
- Basel as 1972–73 Nationalliga A champions: 1973–74 European Cup
- Zürich as 1972–73 Swiss Cup winners: 1973–74 Cup Winners' Cup and entered 1973 Intertoto Cup
- Grasshopper Club as league runners-up: 1973–74 UEFA Cup and entered 1973 Intertoto Cup
- Sion as league third placed team: 1973–74 UEFA Cup
- Winterthur: entered 1973 Intertoto Cup
- Lugano: entered 1973 Intertoto Cup

=== Basel ===
==== European Cup ====
===== First round =====
18 September 1973 First leg	Fram (Iceland)	0–5	(Switzerland) Basel	St. Jakob Stadium, Basel
20:00		UEFA summary FCB summary	2' (1:0) Cubillas; 21' (2:0) Balmer; 75' (3:0) Hasler; 85' (4:0) Balmer; 88' (5:0) Demarmels	Attendance: 8,500; Referee: (Hungary) Sandor Petri
Note: Fram home game

20 September 1973 Second leg	Basel (Switzerland)	6–2 (11–2 agg.)	(Iceland) Fram	Kleinholz Stadion, Olten
20:00	Tanner 4' (0:1); Cubillas 24' (0:2); Geirsson 39' (o.g. 0:3); Tanner 56' (1:4); Wampfler 60' (1:5); Stohler 66' (pen. 1:6)	UEFA summary FCB summary	52' (1:3) Leifsson; 78' (2:6) Elíasson	Attendance: 5,500; Referee: (Hungary) Karoly Palotai
Note: Home game of FCB. Organised by FC Olten

Basel won 11–2 on aggregate'

===== Second round =====
24 October 1973 First leg	Club Brugge (Belgium)	2–1	(Switzerland) Basel	Jan Breydel Stadium, Sint-Andries, Bruges
	Carteus 7' (1:0); Thio 60' (pen. 2:1)	UEFA summary FCB summary	(yellow card) 28' Wampfler; (yellow card) 36' Mundschin; 39' (pen. 1:1) Odermatt; (yellow card) 71' Demarmels	Attendance: 23,000; Referee: (Republic of Ireland) John Carpenter

7 November 1973 Second leg	Basel (Switzerland)	6–4 (7–6 agg.)	(Belgium) Club Brugge	St. Jakob Stadium, Basel
20:00	Rüssmann 19' (o.g. 1:0); Balmer 31' (2:2); Wampfler 37' (3:2); Hitzfeld 63' (pen. 4:3); Hitzfeld 70' (5:4); Hitzfeld 87' (6:4)	UEFA summary FCB summary	23' (1:1) Lambert; 28' (1:2) Carteus; 46' (pen. 3:3) Lambert; 68' (4:4) Lambert; (yellow card) 84' Geels; (yellow card) 87' Bastjins	Attendance: 12,500; Referee: (Denmark) B. Nielsen

Basel won 7–6 on aggregate

===== Quarter-final =====
27 February 1974 First leg	FC Basel (Switzerland)	3–2	(Scotland) Celtic	St. Jakob Stadium, Basel
20:00	Hitzfeld 28' (1:1); Odermatt 31' (2:1); Demarmels (yellow card) 54'; Hitzfeld 64' (pen. 3:2)	UEFA summary FCB summary	21' (0:1) Wilson; 57' (2:2) Dalglish	Attendance: 25,000; Referee: (East Germany) Günter Männig

20 March 1974 Second leg	Celtic (Scotland)	4–2 (a.e.t.) (6–5 agg.)	(Switzerland) FC Basel	Celtic Park, Glasgow
20:00	Dalglish 14' (1:0); Deans 18' (2:0); Hood (yellow card) 43'; Callaghan 62' (3:2); Murray 114'	UEFA summary FCB summary	33' (2:1) Mundschin; (yellow card) 36' Tanner; 48' (2:2) Balmer	Attendance: 71,000; Referee: (France) Michel Kitabidjan

Celtic won 6–5 on aggregate

=== Zürich ===
==== Cup Winners' Cup ====
===== First round =====
19 September 1973 First leg	Anderlecht (Belgium)	3–2	(Switzerland) Zürich	Émile Versé Stadium, Brussels
	Rensenbrink 46', 49', 52'		Stierli 21'; Katić 29'	Attendance: 14,729; Referee: Alistair McKenzie (Scotland)

3 October 1973 Second leg	Zürich (Switzerland)	1–0 (3–3 agg.)	(Belgium) Anderlecht	Letzigrund, Zürich
	Rutschmann 29' (pen.)			Attendance: 19,658; Referee: Antonio Rigo Sureda (Spain)

3-3 on aggregate, Zürich won on away goals.

===== Second round =====
23 October 1973 First leg	Zürich (Switzerland)	0–0	(Sweden) Malmö FF	Letzigrund, Zürich
				Attendance: 10,957; Referee: Antoine Queudeville (Luxembourg)

4 November 1973 Second leg	Malmö FF (Sweden)	1–1 (1–1 agg.)	(Switzerland) Zürich	Malmö Stadion, Malmö
	Malmberg 23'		Katić 68'	Attendance: 7,469; Referee: Günter Männig (East Germany)

1-1 on aggregate, Zürich won on away goals.

===== Quarter-final =====
6 March 1974 First leg	Sporting CP (Portugal)	3–0	(Switzerland) Zürich	Estádio José Alvalade, Lisbon
	Nélson 55'; Marinho 57'; Yazalde 80'			Attendance: 41,280; Referee: Hans-Joachim Weyland (West Germany)

20 March 1974 Second leg	Zürich (Switzerland)	1–1 (1–4 agg.)	(Portugal) Sporting CP	Letzigrund, Zürich
	Botteron 7'		Baltasar 18'	Attendance: 13,697; Referee: György Müncz (Hungary)

Sporting CP won 4-1 on aggregate.

==== Intertoto Cup ====
===== Group 4 =====
Pos	Team	Pld	W	D	L	GF	GA	GD	Pts	ZÜR	SLA	NAN	NOR
1	(Switzerland) Zürich	6	3	2	1	15	9	+6	8	—	3–0	4–1	4–4
2	(Czechoslovakia) Slavia Prague	6	3	1	2	9	7	+2	7	2–1	—	2–1	4–0
3	(France) Nancy	6	2	1	3	7	13	−6	5	1–1	1–0	—	2–1
4	(Sweden) Norrköping	6	1	2	3	12	14	−2	4	1–2	1–1	5–1	—

Source: mogiel.net
Rules for classification: 1) Points; 2) Goal difference; 3) Goals scored; 4) Head-to-head points; 5) Away goals scored; 6) Draw.

7 July 1973 Round 1	Slavia Prague (Czechoslovakia)	2–1	(Switzerland) Zürich	Prague
	Barták 70' (1:1); Veselý 85' (2:1)	FCZ summary	46' (0:1) Martinelli	Attendance: 4,500; Referee: (Czechoslovakia) Zdeněk Jelínek

14 July 1973 Round 2	Zürich (Switzerland)	4–4	(Sweden) Norrköping	Letzigrund, Zürich
18:30	Martinelli 3' (1:0); Marti 6' (2:0); Martinelli 21' (3:0); Rutschmann 61' (4:1)	FCZ summary	50' (3:1) Stern; 77' (4:2) Wendt; 83' (4:3) Hult; 84' (4:4) Danielsson	Attendance: 7,500; Referee: (Switzerland) André Favre (Echallens)
Note: Double match: 18:30 FCZ vs. Norrköpping, 20:15 Grasshoppers vs. Hertha BSC Berlin

21 July 1973 Round 3	Zürich (Switzerland)	3–0	(Czechoslovakia) Slavia Prague	Letzigrund, Zürich
	Kuhn 66' (1:0); Botteron 70' (2:0); Jeandupeux 79' (3:0)	FCZ summary		Attendance: 2,800; Referee: (Switzerland) Bruno della Bruna

28 July 1973 Round 4	Norrköping (Sweden)	1–2	(Switzerland) Zürich	Norrköping
	Kindvall 53' (1:1)	FCZ summary	15' (0:1) Botteron; 60' (1:2) Martinelli	Attendance: 3,000

1 August 1973 Round 5	Zürich (Switzerland)	4–1	(France) Nancy	Letzigrund, Zürich
	Jeandupeux 8' (1:0); Martinelli 27' (2:0); Martinelli 30' (3:0); Stierli 58' (4:1)	FCZ summary	40' (3:1) Prost; (yellow card) Bauda; (yellow card) Vicq	Attendance: 5,500; Referee: (Switzerland) Roland Racine (Prilly)

5 August 1973 Round 6	Nancy (France)	1–1	(Switzerland) Zürich	Stade Marcel Picot, Tomblaine, France
	Herbet 32' (1:0)	FCZ summary	78' (1:1) Jeandupeux	Attendance: 6,000

=== Grasshopper Club ===
==== UEFA Cup ====
===== First round =====
19 September 1973 First leg	Grasshoppers (Switzerland)	1–5	(England) Tottenham Hotspur	Hardturm, Zürich
	Noventa 44' (pen.)	Report	Chivers 5', 72'; Evans 31'; Gilzean 80', 85'	Attendance: 10,314; Referee: Bohumil Kopcio (Czechoslovakia)

3 October 1973 Second leg	Tottenham Hotspur (England)	4–1	(Switzerland) Grasshoppers	White Hart Lane, London
	Lador 73' (o.g.); Peters 79', 88'; England 84'	Report	Elsener 24'	Attendance: 18,105; Referee: Robert Schaut (Belgium)

Tottenham Hotspur won 9–2 on aggregate.

==== Intertoto Cup ====
===== Group 3 =====
Pos	Team	Pld	W	D	L	GF	GA	GD	Pts	HER	CUF	MAL	GRA
1	(West Germany) Hertha Berlin	6	4	2	0	12	6	+6	10	—	1–0	1–1	3–1
2	(Portugal) CUF	6	3	1	2	10	4	+6	7	0–0	—	4–0	2–1
3	(Sweden) Malmö FF	6	3	1	2	8	9	−1	7	2–4	1–0	—	3–0
4	(Switzerland) Grasshopper Club	6	0	0	6	5	16	−11	0	2–3	1–4	0–1	—

Source: mogiel.net
Rules for classification: 1) Points; 2) Goal difference; 3) Goals scored; 4) Head-to-head points; 5) Away goals scored; 6) Draw.

=== Sion ===
==== UEFA Cup ====
===== First round =====
19 September 1973 First leg	Lazio (Italy)	3–0	(Switzerland) Sion	Stadio Olimpico, Rome
	Chinaglia 2', 22' (pen.), 38' (pen.)	Report		Attendance: 24,247; Referee: Joseph Cassar-Naudi (Malta)

3 October 1973 Second leg	Sion (Switzerland)	3–1	(Italy) Lazio	Stade Tourbillon, Sion
	Isoz 14', 90'; Barberis 57'	Report	Garlaschelli 10'	Attendance: 6,653; Referee: Ferdinand Biwersi (West Germany)

Lazio won 4–3 on aggregate.

=== Winterthur ===
==== Intertoto Cup ====
===== Group 1 =====
Pos	Team	Pld	W	D	L	GF	GA	GD	Pts	HAN	ADO	ÅTV	WIN
1	(West Germany) Hannover	6	5	0	1	9	4	+5	10	—	2–1	1–0	3–0
2	(Netherlands) Den Haag	6	2	2	2	8	7	+1	6	0–1	—	3–2	2–0
3	(Sweden) Åtvidaberg	6	1	2	3	8	9	−1	4	2–0	1–1	—	1–1
4	(Switzerland) Winterthur	6	1	2	3	6	11	−5	4	1–2	1–1	3–2	—

Source: mogiel.net
Rules for classification: 1) Points; 2) Goal difference; 3) Goals scored; 4) Head-to-head points; 5) Away goals scored; 6) Draw.

=== Lugano ===
==== Intertoto Cup ====
===== Group 5 =====
Pos	Team	Pld	W	D	L	GF	GA	GD	Pts	RYB	LNZ	ÖRE	LUG
1	(Poland) Rybnik	6	4	1	1	16	6	+10	9	—	3–1	3–1	3–0
2	(Austria) VÖEST Linz	6	3	1	2	12	11	+1	7	2–2	—	2–1	4–1
3	(Sweden) Örebro	6	3	0	3	13	10	+3	6	2–1	4–1	—	0–1
4	(Switzerland) Lugano	6	1	0	5	4	18	−14	2	0–4	0–2	2–5	—

Source: mogiel.net
Rules for classification: 1) Points; 2) Goal difference; 3) Goals scored; 4) Head-to-head points; 5) Away goals scored; 6) Draw.

== Sources ==
- Switzerland 1973–74 at RSSSF
- League Cup finals at RSSSF
- European Competitions 1973–74 at RSSSF.com
- Cup finals at Fussball-Schweiz
- Intertoto history at Pawel Mogielnicki's Page
- Josef Zindel (2018). FC Basel 1893. Die ersten 125 Jahre (in German). Basel: Friedrich Reinhardt Verlag. ISBN 978-3-7245-2305-5.

Preceded by 1972–73	Seasons in Swiss football	Succeeded by 1974–75
