= 1975–76 in Swiss football =

Football in Switzerland
- Season: 1975–76

Men's football
- Nationalliga A: Zürich
- Nationalliga B: AC Bellinzona
- 1. Liga: 1. Liga champions: Mendrisiostar; Group West: FC Bulle; Group Cenral: SC Zug; Group South and East: Mendrisiostar
- Swiss Cup: Zürich
- Swiss League Cup: Young Boys

Women's football
- Swiss Women's Super League: DFC Sion
- Swiss Cup: DFC Sion

The following is a summary of the 1975–76 season of competitive football in Switzerland.

== Nationalliga A ==
=== League table ===
Pos	Team	Pld	W	D	L	GF	GA	GD	Pts	Qualification or relegation
1	Zürich	26	19	6	1	69	26	+43	44	Swiss champions, qualified for 1976–77 European Cup and Swiss Cup winners, entered 1976 Intertoto Cup
2	Servette	26	16	7	3	50	14	+36	39	Swiss Cup runners-up, qualified for 1976–77 Cup Winners' Cup
3	Basel	26	13	8	5	59	38	+21	34	qualified for 1976–77 UEFA Cup
4	Grasshopper Club	26	14	4	8	54	37	+17	32	qualified for 1976–77 UEFA Cup and entered 1976 Intertoto Cup
5	Young Boys	26	11	9	6	41	27	+14	31	entered 1976 Intertoto Cup
6	Xamax	26	11	8	7	37	25	+12	30	
7	St. Gallen	26	8	11	7	41	39	+2	27	entered 1976 Intertoto Cup
8	Lausanne-Sport	26	10	6	10	35	39	−4	26	
9	Sion	26	6	9	11	40	54	−14	21	
10	Chênois	26	5	9	12	30	42	−12	19	
11	Winterthur	26	8	2	16	34	65	−31	18	
12	Lugano	26	5	6	15	19	37	−18	16	Relegated to Nationalliga B
13	La Chaux-de-Fonds	26	5	4	17	27	61	−34	14	Relegated to Nationalliga B
14	Biel-Bienne	26	5	3	18	26	58	−32	13	Relegated to Nationalliga B

Source: rsssf.com
Rules for classification: 1) Points; 2) Goal difference within the league, however with play-off for qualifiers;

== Nationalliga B ==
=== League table ===
Pos	Team	Pld	W	D	L	GF	GA	GD	Pts	Qualification or relegation
1	AC Bellinzona	26	14	7	5	47	29	+18	35	To play-off for promotion
2	Luzern	26	15	5	6	61	35	+26	35	To play-off for promotion
3	Etoile Carouge FC	26	13	6	7	48	42	+6	32	
4	FC Nordstern Basel	26	10	7	9	58	44	+14	27	
5	Vevey Sports	26	8	10	8	47	47	0	26	
6	FC Fribourg	26	10	5	11	47	40	+7	25	
7	FC Grenchen	26	10	5	11	58	53	+5	25	
8	FC Gossau	26	10	5	11	40	40	0	25	
9	FC Young Fellows Zürich	26	9	6	11	31	43	−12	24	
10	FC Aarau	26	8	7	11	35	38	−3	23	
11	FC Chiasso	26	8	7	11	36	40	−4	23	
12	FC Raron	26	10	3	13	29	52	−23	23	
13	FC Martigny-Sports	26	6	10	10	27	47	−20	22	Relegated to 1976–77 1. Liga
14	FC Wettingen	26	5	9	12	33	47	−14	19	Relegated to 1976–77 1. Liga

Source: rsssf.com
Rules for classification: 1) Points; 2) Goal difference within the league, however with play-off for qualifiers;

=== Play-off for promotion ===
15 June 1976

AC Bellinzona	1–0	Luzern
Edoardo Manzoni 44'	summary

Letzigrund, Zürich
Referee: (Switzerland)

== 1. Liga ==
=== Group West ===
Pos	Team	Pld	W	D	L	GF	GA	GD	Pts	Qualification or relegation
1	FC Bulle	24	16	3	5	45	29	+16	35	Play-off to Nationalliga B
2	FC Bern	24	14	4	6	43	30	+13	32	Play-off to Nationalliga B
3	FC Stade Lausanne	24	11	6	7	49	35	+14	28	
4	FC Dürrenast	24	9	8	7	45	39	+6	26	
5	ASI Audax-Friul	24	9	6	9	42	42	0	24	
6	FC Meyrin	24	6	12	6	33	35	−2	24	
7	FC Boudry	24	10	4	10	31	33	−2	24	
8	Central Fribourg	24	10	4	10	28	31	−3	24	
9	FC Fétigny	24	8	7	9	33	41	−8	23	
10	FC Stade Nyonnais	24	7	7	10	35	31	+4	21	
11	FC Monthey	24	6	9	9	23	28	−5	21	
12	FC Le Locle	24	7	6	11	29	25	+4	20	Play-out against relegation
13	FC Montreux-Sports	24	1	8	15	25	62	−37	10	Relegation to 2. Liga Interregional

Source: RSSSF
Rules for classification: 1) Points; 2) Goal difference within the league, but decider play-off for qualifiers; 3) Goals scored; 4) Head-to-head points; 5) Away goals scored; 6) Draw.

=== Group Central ===
Pos	Team	Pld	W	D	L	GF	GA	GD	Pts	Qualification or relegation
1	SC Zug	24	13	7	4	41	17	+24	33	Play-off to Nationalliga B
2	SC Kriens	24	10	12	2	42	22	+20	32	Play-off to Nationalliga B
3	FC Laufen	24	11	7	6	35	25	+10	29	
4	FC Köniz	24	11	7	6	29	21	+8	29	
5	SR Delémont	24	12	5	7	36	33	+3	29	
6	FC Solothurn	24	9	6	9	29	27	+2	24	
7	FC Brunnen	24	8	8	8	34	34	0	24	
8	SC Buochs	24	8	6	10	34	39	−5	22	
9	FC Zug	24	8	4	12	33	46	−13	20	
10	US Boncourt	24	7	4	13	31	35	−4	18	
11	SC Kleinhüningen	24	6	6	12	21	41	−20	18	
12	FC Concordia Basel	24	5	7	12	23	28	−5	17	Play-out against relegation
13	FC Emmenbrücke	24	5	7	12	25	35	−10	17	Relegation to 2. Liga Interregional

Source: RSSSF
Rules for classification: 1) Points; 2) Goal difference within the league, but decider play-off for qualifiers; 3) Goals scored; 4) Head-to-head points; 5) Away goals scored; 6) Draw.

=== Group East ===
Pos	Team	Pld	W	D	L	GF	GA	GD	Pts	Qualification or relegation
1	Mendrisiostar	24	12	9	3	39	24	+15	33	Play-off to Nationalliga B
2	FC Morbio	24	12	8	4	32	19	+13	32	Did not apply for professional licence
3	FC Locarno	24	11	6	7	28	20	+8	28	Play-off to Nationalliga B
4	FC Frauenfeld	24	12	3	9	43	28	+15	27	
5	FC Schaffhausen	24	10	6	8	32	25	+7	26	
6	FC Blue Stars Zürich	24	9	7	8	44	36	+8	25	
7	FC Baden	24	7	11	6	26	24	+2	25	
8	SC Brühl	24	9	5	10	41	33	+8	23	
9	FC Red Star Zürich	24	11	1	12	34	48	−14	23	
10	FC Chur	24	7	8	9	34	42	−8	22	
11	FC Rüti	24	8	6	10	25	34	−9	22	
12	FC Tössfeld	24	5	6	13	23	37	−14	16	Play-out against relegation
13	US Giubiasco	24	1	8	15	18	49	−31	10	Relegation to 2. Liga Interregional

Source: RSSSF
Rules for classification: 1) Points; 2) Goal difference within the league, but decider play-off for qualifiers; 3) Goals scored; 4) Head-to-head points; 5) Away goals scored; 6) Draw.

=== Promotion play-off ===
==== Qualification round ====
Team 1	Score	Team 2
SC Kriens	3–1	FC Bulle
FC Bulle	0–1	SC Kriens

SC Kriens win 4–1 on aggregate and continue to the finals.

Team 1	Score	Team 2
FC Bern	1–1	Mendrisiostar
Mendrisiostar	2–1	FC Bern

Mendrisiostar win 3–2 on aggregate and continue to the finals.

Team 1	Score	Team 2
FC Locarno	1–0	SC Zug
SC Zug	3–0	FC Locarno

SC Zug win 3–1 on aggregate and continue to the finals.

==== Final round ====
The three first round winners competed in a single round-robin to decide the two promotion slots. The games were played on 20 June, 27 June and 4 July.

Pos	Team	Pld	W	D	L	GF	GA	GD	Pts	MEN	KRI	SCZ
1	Mendrisiostar	2	1	1	0	3	2	+1	3	—	1–0	—
2	SC Kriens	2	1	0	1	2	1	+1	2	—	—	2–0
3	SC Zug	2	0	1	1	2	4	−2	1	2–2	—	—

Source: RSSSF

Mendrisiostar are 1. Liga champions, SC Kriens are runners-up and these two teams are promoted.

=== Relegation play-out ===
The three second last placed teams from each group competed in a single round-robin play-out to decide the fourth and last relegation slot.

Pos	Team	Pld	W	D	L	GF	GA	GD	Pts	LeL	CON	TÖS
1	FC Le Locle	2	1	1	0	2	1	+1	3	—	2–1	—
2	FC Concordia Basel	2	1	0	1	4	3	+1	2	—	—	3–1
3	FC Tössfeld	2	0	1	1	1	3	−2	1	0–0	—	—

Source: RSSSF

FC Tössfeld are relegated to 2. Liga Interregional.

== Swiss Cup ==
The competition was played in a knockout system. In the case of a draw, extra time was played. If the teams were still level after extra time, the match was replayed at the away team's ground. In case of a draw after extra time, the replay was to be decided with a penalty shoot-out. The Quarter- and Semi-finals were played as two legged rounds, home and away. The final was held in Bern.

=== Early rounds ===
The routes of the finalists to the final were:

- Third round: NLA teams with a bye.
- Fourth round: Zug-Zürich 0:2. Etoile Carouge-Servette 1:3.
- Fifth round: Frauenfeld-Zürich 0:2. Servette-Xamax 2:1.
- Quarter-finals: First leg: Zürich-YB 3:1. Return leg: YB-Zürich 0:2 (agg 1:5). First leg: Fribourg-Servette 0:2. Return leg: Fribourg-Servette 0:3 (agg 0:5).
- Semi-finals: First leg: Biel-Zürich 1:0. Return leg: ZürichBiel 7:2 (agg 7:3). First leg: Servette-GC 6:2. Return leg: GC-Servette 2:1 (agg 4:7).

=== Final ===
Easter Monday 19 April 1976
15:00

Zürich	1–0	Servette
Katić 9'	Report

Wankdorf Stadium, Bern
Attendance: 46,000
Referee: (Switzerland) Jean Dubach (Nidau)

== Swiss League Cup ==
The League Cup was played in a knockout system with all 28 league clubs plus four selected teams from the 1. Liga. In the case of a draw, extra time was played. If the teams were still level after extra time, the decision was brought about with a penalty shoot-out. The final was played in Bern.

=== Early rounds ===
The routes of the finalists to the final were:

- First round: Aarau-YB 3:5 (a.e.t.). Zürich-GC 2:2 (a.e.t.) 4:2 (p).
- Second round: YB-La Chaux-de-Fonds 4–0. Laufen-Zürich 1:7.
- Quarter-finals: Raron-YB 0:3. Lugano-Zürich 0:1 (a.e.t.).
- Semi-finals: Basel-YB 3:5 (a.e.t.). Zürich-Sion 5:0

=== Final ===
23 May 1979

Young Boys	4–2	Zürich
Küttel 1'; Bruttin 67'; Küttel 71'; Rebmann 73'	Summary	80' Katić; 97' Katić

Wankdorf Stadium, Bern
Attendance: 10,000
Referee: (Switzerland) Roland Racine (Prilly)

== Swiss Clubs in Europe ==
- Zürich as 1974–75 Nationalliga A champions: 1975–76 European Cup and entered 1975 Intertoto Cup
- Basel as 1974–75 Swiss Cup winners: 1975–76 Cup Winners' Cup
- Young Boys as league runners-up: 1975–76 UEFA Cup and entered 1975 Intertoto Cup
- Grasshopper Club as league third placed team: 1975–76 UEFA Cup and entered 1975 Intertoto Cup
- Winterthur: entered 1975 Intertoto Cup

=== Zürich ===
==== European Cup ====
===== First round =====
17 September 1975 First leg	Újpesti Dózsa (Hungary)	4–0	(Switzerland) Zürich	Megyeri úti Stadion, Ujpest
	Fazekas 10'; Dunai 12'; Tóth 56' (pen.); Kellner 78'	Report		Attendance: 7,691; Referee: Doğan Babacan (Turkey)

1 October 1975 Second leg	Zürich (Switzerland)	5–1	(Hungary) Újpesti Dózsa	Letzigrund, Zürich
	Katić 2'; Risi 23', 38', 83'; Kühn 45'	Report	Nagy 57'	Attendance: 4,585; Referee: Adolf Prokop (East Germany)

5–5 on aggregate; Újpesti Dózsa won on away goals.

==== Intertoto Cup ====
===== Group 3 =====
Pos	Team	Pld	W	D	L	GF	GA	GD	Pts	EIN	VOJ	ZÜR	VEJ
1	(West Germany) Eintracht Braunschweig	6	4	0	2	13	5	+8	8	—	2–1	2–0	3–0
2	(Socialist Federal Republic of Yugoslavia) Vojvodina	6	3	1	2	14	8	+6	7	3–1	—	4–1	4–1
3	(Switzerland) Zürich	6	2	2	2	6	8	−2	6	1–0	0–0	—	2–2
4	(Denmark) Vejle	6	1	1	4	6	18	−12	3	0–5	2–2	0–2	—

Source: mogiel.net
Rules for classification: 1) Points; 2) Goal difference; 3) Goals scored; 4) Head-to-head points; 5) Away goals scored; 6) Draw.

28 June 1975 Matchday 1	Zürich (Switzerland)	2–2	(Denmark) Vejle	Sportplatz Moos, Affoltern am Albis
	Scheiwiler 17' (1:0); Senn 64' (2:0)	FCZ summary	(yellow card) 75' Junker; 79' (2:1) Karl Aage Damsgaard; 89' (2:2 og) (Zigerlig)	Attendance: 1,500; Referee: (Switzerland) Roland Racine (Prilly)

5 July 1975 Matchday 2	Vojvodina (Socialist Federal Republic of Yugoslavia)	4–1	(Switzerland) Zürich	Novi Sad
	Vukašinović 8' (1:0); Srdanović 17' (2:0); Vučeković 75' (3:1); Vučeković 80' (4:1)	FCZ summary	44' (2:1) Katić	Attendance: 3,000; Referee: (Socialist Federal Republic of Yugoslavia) Milivoje Gugulović

12 July 1975 Matchday 3	Zürich (Switzerland)	1–0	(West Germany) Eintracht Braunschweig	Letzigrund, Zürich
17:00	Risi 82' (1:0)	FCZ summary		Attendance: 2,500; Referee: (Switzerland) Ernst Dörflinger (Grenchen)

19 July 1975 Matchday 4	Zürich (Switzerland)	0–0	(Socialist Federal Republic of Yugoslavia) Vojvodina	Letzigrund, Zürich
	Risi (yellow card)	FCZ summary	(yellow card) Jurčić	Attendance: 3,200; Referee: (Switzerland) André Favre (Echallens)

26 July 1975 Matchday 5	Vejle (Denmark)	0–2	(Switzerland) Zürich	Copenhagen
		FCZ summary	18' (0:1) Botteron; 56' (0:2) Martinelli	Attendance: 2,400; Referee: (Denmark) Kaj Rasmussen

29 July 1975 Matchday 6	Eintracht Braunschweig (West Germany)	2–0	(Switzerland) Zürich	Braunschweig
	Bründl 8' (1:0); Hollmann 66' (2:0)	FCZ summary

=== Basel ===
==== Cup Winners' Cup ====
===== First round =====
17 September 1975 First leg	Basel (Switzerland)	1 – 2	(Spain) Atlético Madrid	St. Jakob Stadium, Basel
20:00	Schönenberger 3' (1:0); Nielsen (yellow card) 43'	Summary	65' (1:1) Gárate; (yellow card) 66' Díaz; 68' (1:2) Ayala; (yellow card) 76' Salcedo	Attendance: 33,000; Referee: (France) Robert Wurtz

1 October 1975 Second leg	Atlético Madrid (Spain)	1 – 1 (3 – 2 agg.)	(Switzerland) Basel	Vicente Calderón Stadium, Madrid
21:00	Bezerra 74' (1:0)	Summary	(yellow card) 83' Mundschin; 89' (1:1) Demarmels	Attendance: 25,000; Referee: (Austria) Paul Schiller

Atlético Madrid won 3–2 on aggregate.

=== Young Boys ===
==== UEFA Cup ====
===== First round =====
17 September 1975 First leg	Young Boys (Switzerland)	0–0	(West Germany) Hamburg	Wankdorf Stadium, Bern
		Report		Attendance: 17,173; Referee: Ángel Franco Martínez (Spain)

1 October 1975 Second leg	Hamburg (West Germany)	4–2	(Switzerland) Young Boys	Volksparkstadion, Hamburg
	Reimann 15'; Bertl 50', 67'; Bjørnmose 85'	Report	Siegenthaler 65', 87'	Attendance: 29,199; Referee: Pat Partridge (England)

Hamburg won 4–2 on aggregate.

==== Intertoto Cup ====
===== Group 8 =====
Pos	Team	Pld	W	D	L	GF	GA	GD	Pts	KAI	B05	YB	GAIS
1	(West Germany) Kaiserslautern	6	5	0	1	19	6	+13	10	—	2–0	4–2	6–0
2	(Czechoslovakia) Bohemians Prague	6	5	0	1	9	6	+3	10	2–1	—	2–1	1–0
3	(Switzerland) Young Boys	6	1	0	5	9	15	−6	2	1–3	1–2	—	3–4
4	(Sweden) GAIS	6	1	0	5	6	16	−10	2	1–3	1–2	0–1	—

Source: mogiel.net
Rules for classification: 1) Points; 2) Goal difference; 3) Goals scored; 4) Head-to-head points; 5) Away goals scored; 6) Draw.

=== Grasshopper Club ===
==== UEFA Cup ====
===== First round =====
16 September 1975 First leg	Grasshopper Club (Switzerland)	3–3	(Spain) Real Sociedad	Hardturm, Zürich
	Elsener 24'; Santrač 27'; Bosco 62'	Report	Satrústegui 30', 32'; Murillo 65'	Attendance: 6,600; Referee: Marijan Raus (Yugoslavia)

1 October 1975 Second leg	Real Sociedad (Spain)	1–1	(Switzerland) Grasshoppers	Atotxa Stadium, San Sebastián
	Urreisti 37'	Report	Santrač 79'	Attendance: 11,192; Referee: José Baltasar (Portugal)

4–4 on aggregate; Real Sociedad won on away goals.

==== Intertoto Cup ====
===== Group 6 =====
Pos	Team	Pld	W	D	L	GF	GA	GD	Pts	RYB	GCZ	AZ	ÖST
1	(Poland) Rybnik	6	4	2	0	8	3	+5	10	—	1–0	2–2	2–1
2	(Switzerland) Grasshopper Club	6	3	0	3	13	12	+1	6	0–2	—	3–2	4–2
3	(Netherlands) AZ	6	2	2	2	8	8	0	6	0–0	3–1	—	1–0
4	(Sweden) Öster	6	1	0	5	7	13	−6	2	0–1	2–5	2–0	—

Source: mogiel.net
Rules for classification: 1) Points; 2) Goal difference; 3) Goals scored; 4) Head-to-head points; 5) Away goals scored; 6) Draw.

=== Winterthur ===
==== Intertoto Cup ====
===== Group 2 =====
Pos	Team	Pld	W	D	L	GF	GA	GD	Pts	LNZ	BRA	B03	WIN
1	(Austria) VÖEST Linz	6	6	0	0	18	6	+12	12	—	2–1	3–0	4–2
2	(Czechoslovakia) Inter Bratislava	6	4	0	2	13	6	+7	8	0–2	—	2–0	4–0
3	(Denmark) B 1903	6	1	0	5	8	13	−5	2	3–4	1–3	—	4–0
4	(Switzerland) Winterthur	6	1	0	5	4	18	−14	2	0–3	1–3	1–0	—

Source: mogiel.net
Rules for classification: 1) Points; 2) Goal difference; 3) Goals scored; 4) Head-to-head points; 5) Away goals scored; 6) Draw.

== Sources ==
- Switzerland 1975–76 at RSSSF
- League Cup finals at RSSSF
- European Competitions 1975–76 at RSSSF.com
- Cup finals at Fussball-Schweiz
- Intertoto history at Pawel Mogielnicki's Page
- Josef Zindel (2018). FC Basel 1893. Die ersten 125 Jahre (in German). Basel: Friedrich Reinhardt Verlag. ISBN 978-3-7245-2305-5.

Preceded by 1974–75	Seasons in Swiss football	Succeeded by 1976–77
