= 1973–74 European Cup =

European football tournament

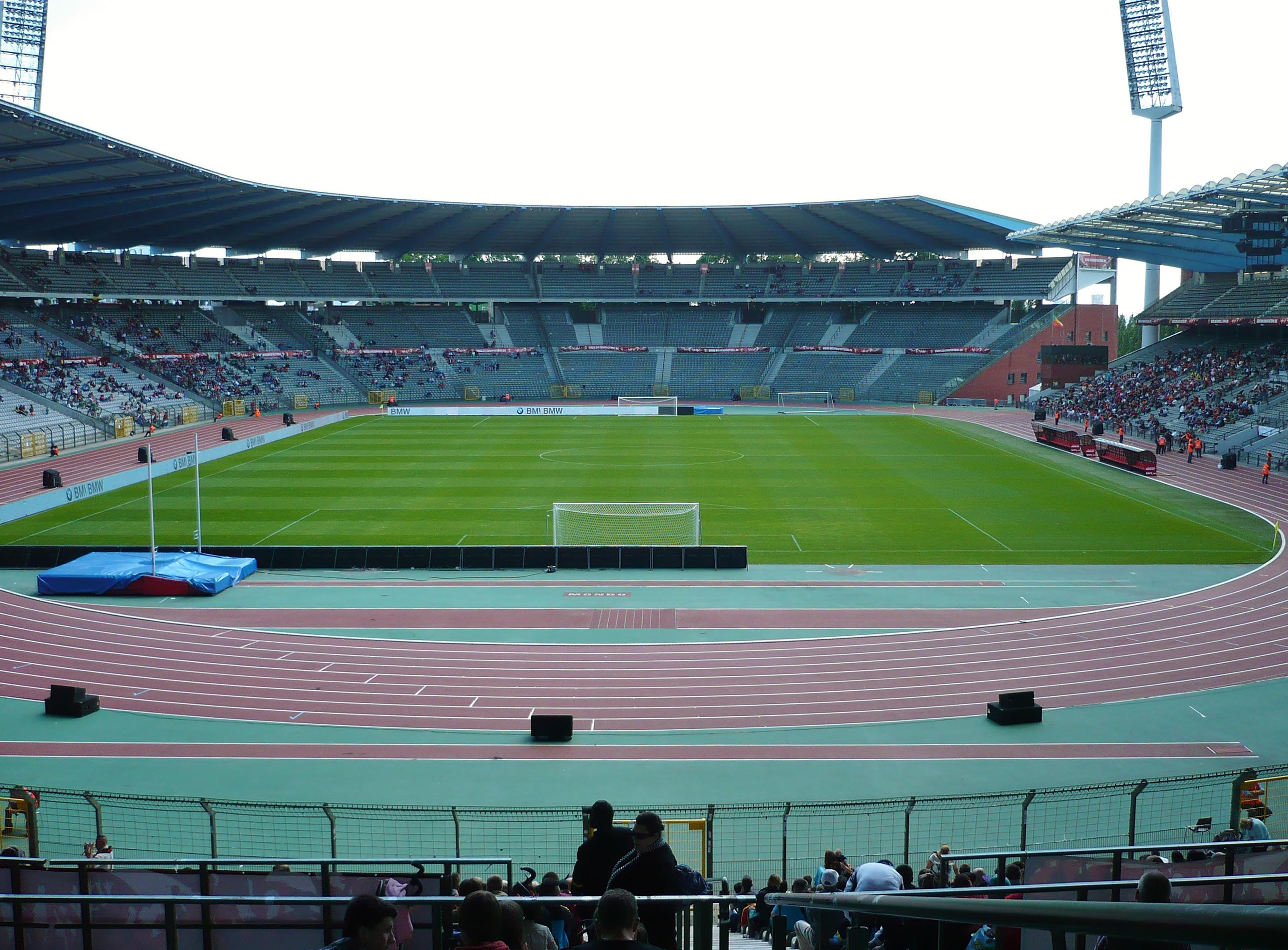
- The Heysel Stadium in Brussels hosted the final.

Tournament details
- Dates: 19 September 1973 – 17 May 1974
- Teams: 31

Final positions
- Champions: (West Germany) Bayern Munich (1st title)
- Runners-up: (Spain) Atlético Madrid

Tournament statistics
- Matches played: 60
- Goals scored: 180 (3 per match)
- Attendance: 1,694,422 (28,240 per match)
- Top scorer(s): Gerd Müller (Bayern Munich); 8 goals

The 1973–74 season of the European Cup football club tournament was won for the first time by Bayern Munich, beginning their own three-year period of domination, in a replayed final against Atlético Madrid, the only such occasion in the tournament's final. This was the first time the cup went to Germany, and the only European Cup final to require a replay after the first match was drawn 1–1 after extra time.

Ajax, the three-time defending champions, were eliminated by CSKA Sofia in the second round.

== Teams ==
(Austria) Wacker Innsbruck (1st)	(Belgium) Club Brugge (1st)	(Bulgaria) CSKA Sofia (1st)	(Cyprus) APOEL (1st)
(Czechoslovakia) Spartak Trnava (1st)	(Denmark) Vejle (1st)	(England) Liverpool (1st)	(Finland) TPS (1st)
(France) Nantes (1st)	(East Germany) Dynamo Dresden (1st)	(West Germany) Bayern Munich (1st)	(Greece) Olympiacos (1st)
(Hungary) Újpest (1st)	(Iceland) Fram (1st)	(Republic of Ireland) Waterford United (1st)	(Italy) Juventus (1st)
(Luxembourg) Jeunesse Esch (1st)	(Malta) Floriana (1st)	(Netherlands) Ajax (1st)^{TH}	(Northern Ireland) Crusaders (1st)
(Norway) Viking (1st)	(Poland) Stal Mielec (1st)	(Portugal) Benfica (1st)	(Romania) Dinamo București (1st)
(Scotland) Celtic (1st)	(Spain) Atlético Madrid (1st)	(Sweden) Åtvidaberg (1st)	(Switzerland) Basel (1st)
(Turkey) Galatasaray (1st)	(Soviet Union) Zaria Voroshilovgrad (1st)	(Socialist Federal Republic of Yugoslavia) Red Star Belgrade (1st)	

== Bracket ==
First round
(Belgium) Club Brugge	8	2	10
(Malta) Floriana	0	0	0
(Switzerland) Basel	5	6	11
(Iceland) Fram	0	2	2
(Finland) TPS	1	0	1
(Scotland) Celtic	6	3	9
(Denmark) Vejle	2	1	3
(France) Nantes	2	0	2
(Socialist Federal Republic of Yugoslavia) Crvena zvezda	2	1	3
(Poland) Stal Mielec	1	0	1
(Luxembourg) Jeunesse Esch	1	0	1
(England) Liverpool	1	2	3
(Northern Ireland) Crusaders	0	0	0
(Romania) Dinamo București	1	11	12
(Spain) Atlético Madrid	0	1	1
(Turkey) Galatasaray	0	0	0
(Norway) Viking	1	0	1
(Czechoslovakia) Spartak Trnava	2	1	3
(Soviet Union) Zaria Voroshilovgrad	2	1	3
(Cyprus) APOEL	0	0	0
(Portugal) Benfica	1	1	2
(Greece) Olympiacos	0	0	0
(Republic of Ireland) Waterford United	2	0	2
(Hungary) Újpest	3	3	6
(West Germany) Bayern Munich	3	1	4(4)
(Sweden) Åtvidaberg	1	3	4(3)
(East Germany) Dynamo Dresden	2	2	4
(Italy) Juventus	0	3	3
(Bulgaria) CSKA	3	1	4
(Austria) Wacker	0	0	0

Second round
(Belgium) Club Brugge	2	4	6
(Switzerland) Basel	1	6	7
(Scotland) Celtic	0	1	1
(Denmark) Vejle	0	0	0
(Socialist Federal Republic of Yugoslavia) Crvena zvezda	2	2	4
(England) Liverpool	1	1	2
(Romania) Dinamo București	0	2	2
(Spain) Atlético Madrid	2	2	4
(Czechoslovakia) Spartak Trnava	0	1	1
(Soviet Union) Zaria Voroshilovgrad	0	0	0
(Portugal) Benfica	1	0	1
(Hungary) Újpest	1	2	3
(West Germany) Bayern Munich	4	3	7
(East Germany) Dynamo Dresden	3	3	6
(Netherlands) Ajax	1	0	1
(Bulgaria) CSKA	0	2	2

Quarter-finals
(Switzerland) Basel	3	2	5
(Scotland) Celtic	2	4	6
(Socialist Federal Republic of Yugoslavia) Crvena zvezda	0	0	0
(Spain) Atlético Madrid	2	0	2
(Czechoslovakia) Spartak Trnava	1	1	2(3)
(Hungary) Újpest	1	1	2(4)
(West Germany) Bayern Munich	4	1	5
(Bulgaria) CSKA	1	2	3

Semi-finals
(Scotland) Celtic	0	0	0
(Spain) Atlético Madrid	0	2	2
(Hungary) Újpest	1	0	1
(West Germany) Bayern Munich	1	3	4

Final
(Spain) Atlético Madrid	1 a.e.t. 0 replay
(West Germany) Bayern Munich	1 a.e.t. 4 replay

== First round ==
Team 1	Agg.	Team 2	1st leg	2nd leg
Viking (Norway)	1–3	(Czechoslovakia) Spartak Trnava	1–2	0–1
Zaria Voroshilovgrad (Soviet Union)	3–0	(Cyprus) APOEL	2–0	1–0
Benfica (Portugal)	2–0	(Greece) Olympiacos	1–0	1–0
Waterford United (Republic of Ireland)	2–6	(Hungary) Újpest	2–3	0–3
Bayern Munich (West Germany)	4–4 (4–3 p)	(Sweden) Åtvidaberg	3–1	1–3
Dynamo Dresden (East Germany)	4–3	(Italy) Juventus	2–0	2–3
Ajax (Netherlands)	Bye	–	–	–
CSKA Sofia (Bulgaria)	4–0	(Austria) Wacker	3–0	1–0
Club Brugge (Belgium)	10–0	(Malta) Floriana	8–0	2–0
Basel (Switzerland)	11–2	(Iceland) Fram	5–0	6–2
TPS (Finland)	1–9	(Scotland) Celtic	1–6	0–3
Vejle (Denmark)	3–2	(France) Nantes	2–2	1–0
Red Star Belgrade (Socialist Federal Republic of Yugoslavia)	3–1	(Poland) Stal Mielec	2–1	1–0
Jeunesse Esch (Luxembourg)	1–3	(England) Liverpool	1–1	0–2
Crusaders (Northern Ireland)	0–12	(Romania) Dinamo București	0–1	0–11
Atlético Madrid (Spain)	1–0	(Turkey) Galatasaray	0–0	1–0

=== First leg ===
19 September 1973

Viking (Norway)	1–2	(Czechoslovakia) Spartak Trnava
Kvia 59'	Report	Adamec 13'; Martinkovič 36'

Stavanger Stadion, Stavanger
Attendance: 11,898
Referee: Anders Mattsson (Finland)

19 September 1973
19:00

Zorya Voroshilovgrad (Soviet Union)	2–0	(Cyprus) APOEL
Belousov 24'; V. Kuznetsov 27'	Report

Stadion Avanhard, Voroshilovgrad
Attendance: 16,138 (Note: according to the Zorya Luhansk fan website, 30,000)
Referee: Helmut Bader (East Germany)

19 September 1973

Benfica (Portugal)	1–0	(Greece) Olympiacos
Timula 53'	Report

Estádio da Luz, Lisbon
Attendance: 31,959
Referee: Theo Boosten (Netherlands)

19 September 1973

Waterford United (Republic of Ireland)	2–3	(Hungary) Újpest
Kirby 13'; O'Neill 90'	Report	Zámbó 9'; Fazekas 64'; Nagy 69'

Lansdowne Road, Dublin
Attendance: 5,621
Referee: Preben Christophersen (Denmark)

19 September 1973

Bayern Munich (West Germany)	3–1	(Sweden) Åtvidaberg
Müller 3', 72'; Olsson 68' (o.g.)	Report	Dürnberger 66' (o.g.)

Olympiastadion, Munich
Attendance: 28,279
Referee: Josef Pláček (Czech Republic)

19 September 1973

Dynamo Dresden (East Germany)	2–0	(Italy) Juventus
Kreische 28'; Schade 39'	Report

Dynamostadion, Dresden
Attendance: 29,196
Referee: Anton Bucheli (Switzerland)

19 September 1973

CSKA Sofia (Bulgaria)	3–0	(Austria) Wacker Innsbruck
Marashliev 3'; Zhekov 26'; Denev 38'	Report

Armiyata, Sofia
Attendance: 25,000
Referee: Klaus Ohmsen (West Germany)

19 September 1973

Club Brugge (Belgium)	8–0	(Malta) Floriana
Lambert 5', 48', 55' le Fevre 20'; Carteus 34', 74'; Houwaart 39'; Rüssmann 43'	Report

De Klokke, Bruges
Attendance: 10,093
Referee: Norbert Rolles (Luxembourg)

18 September 1973

Basel (Switzerland)	5–0	(Iceland) Fram
Cubillas 2'; Balmer 21', 85'; Hasler 75'; Demarmels 88'	Report

St. Jakob Stadium, Basel
Attendance: 8,277
Referee: Sándor Petri (Hungary)

19 September 1973

TPS (Finland)	1–6	(Scotland) Celtic
Andelmin 17' (pen.)	Report	Callaghan 2', 88'; Hood 22'; Johnstone 61'; Connelly 78' (pen.); Deans 86'

Kupittaan jalkapallostadion, Turku
Attendance: 3,143
Referee: Rolf Haugen (Norway)

19 September 1973

Vejle (Denmark)	2–2	(France) Nantes
Markussen 5'; Lund 17'	Report	Rampillon 21'; Couécou 60'

Vejle Stadion, Vejle
Attendance: 8,800
Referee: John Paterson (Scotland)

19 September 1973

Red Star Belgrade (Socialist Federal Republic of Yugoslavia)	2–1	(Poland) Stal Mielec
Petrović 2'; Karasi 66'	Report	Lato 46'

Stadion Crvena Zvezda, Belgrade
Attendance: 20,191
Referee: Hilmi Ok (Turkey)

19 September 1973

Jeunesse Esch (Luxembourg)	1–1	(England) Liverpool
Dussier 88'	Report	Hall 43'

Stade de la Frontière, Esch-sur-Alzette
Attendance: 7,000
Referee: Jean Bancourt (France)

19 September 1973

Crusaders (Northern Ireland)	0–1	(Romania) Dinamo București
	Report	Sălceanu 1'

Windsor Park, Belfast
Attendance: 2,500
Referee: Pierre Wouters (Belgium)

19 September 1973

Atlético Madrid (Spain)	0–0	(Turkey) Galatasaray
	Report

Vicente Calderón, Madrid
Attendance: 34,259
Referee: Charles Corver (Netherlands)

=== Second leg ===
3 October 1973

Spartak Trnava (Czechoslovakia)	1–0	(Norway) Viking
Martinkovič 25'	Report

Stadion Spartak, Trnava
Attendance: 9,580
Referee: Rudolf Scheurer (Switzerland)

Spartak Trnava won 3–1 on aggregate.

3 October 1973
15:00

APOEL (Cyprus)	0–1	(Soviet Union) Zorya Voroshilovgrad
	Report	Kuksov 58'

Stádio GSP, Nicosia
Attendance: 1,885
Referee: Liuben Radunchev (Bulgaria)

Zorya Voroshilovgrad won 3–0 on aggregate.

3 October 1973

Olympiacos (Greece)	0–1	(Portugal) Benfica
	Report	Nené 29'

Stádio Geórgios Karaïskákis, Piraeus
Attendance: 40,502
Referee: Paul Schiller (Austria)

Benfica won 2–0 on aggregate.

3 October 1973

Újpest (Hungary)	3–0	(Republic of Ireland) Waterford United
E. Dunai 9'; Fazekas 67'; Nagy 86'	Report

Megyeri úti Stadion, Budapest
Attendance: 9,892
Referee: Dusan Maksimović (Serbia)

Újpest won 6–2 on aggregate.

3 October 1973

Åtvidaberg (Sweden)	3–1 (a.e.t.)	(West Germany) Bayern Munich
Torstensson 7', 72'; Wallinder 15'	Report	Hoeneß 75'
Penalties
Torstensson (penalty scored); Almqvist (penalty scored); Magnusson (penalty scored); Karlsson (penalty missed); Franzén (penalty missed)	3–4	(penalty scored) Kapellmann; (penalty missed) Gersdorff; (penalty scored) Müller; (penalty scored) Hoeneß; (penalty scored) Beckenbauer

Kopparvallen, Atvidaberg
Attendance: 9,251
Referee: Jack Taylor (England)

4–4 on aggregate; Bayern Munich won on penalties.

3 October 1973

Juventus (Italy)	3–2	(East Germany) Dynamo Dresden
Furino 9'; Altafini 25'; Cuccureddu 30'	Report	Capello 24' (o.g.); Sachse 75'

Stadio Comunale, Turin
Attendance: 64,763
Referee: Vital Loraux (Belgium)

Dynamo Dresden won 4–3 on aggregate.

3 October 1973

Wacker Innsbruck (Austria)	0–1	(Bulgaria) CSKA Sofia
	Report	Zhekov 18'

Tivoli, Innsbruck
Attendance: 8,000
Referee: Paolo Toselli (Italy)

CSKA Sofia won 4–0 on aggregate.

3 October 1973

Floriana (Malta)	0–2	(Belgium) Club Brugge
	Report	Thio 65'; Houwaart 85'

Empire Stadium, Gżira
Attendance: 1,740
Referee: Pat Partridge (England)

Club Brugge won 10–0 on aggregate.

20 September 1973

Fram (Iceland)	2–6	(Switzerland) Basel
Leifsson 52'; Elíasson 78'	Report	Tanner 4', 56'; Cubillas 24'; Geirsson 39' (o.g.); Wampfler 60'; Stohler 66' (pen.)

Kleinholz Stadion, Olten
Attendance: 5,548
Referee: Károly Palotai (Hungary)

Basel won 11–2 on aggregate.

3 October 1973

Celtic (Scotland)	3–0	(Finland) TPS
Deans 20'; Johnstone 27', 53'	Report

Celtic Park, Glasgow
Attendance: 15,969
Referee: Magnús Pétursson (Iceland)

Celtic won 9–1 on aggregate.

3 October 1973

Nantes (France)	0–1	(Denmark) Vejle
	Report	Nørregaard 62'

Stade Marcel Saupin, Nantes
Attendance: 11,844
Referee: John Williams (Wales)

Vejle won 3–2 on aggregate.

3 October 1973

Stal Mielec (Poland)	0–1	(Socialist Federal Republic of Yugoslavia) Red Star Belgrade
	Report	Lazarević 26'

Cracovia Stadium, Kraków
Attendance: 20,212
Referee: Pavel Kazakov (Russia)

Red Star Belgrade won 3–1 on aggregate.

3 October 1973

Liverpool (England)	2–0	(Luxembourg) Jeunesse Esch
Mond 47' (o.g.); Toshack 56'	Report

Anfield, Liverpool
Attendance: 28,714
Referee: Rolf Arnshed (Sweden)

Liverpool won 3–1 on aggregate.

3 October 1973

Dinamo București (Romania)	11–0	(Northern Ireland) Crusaders
Georgescu 7', 14', 47', 63'; Nunweiller 19', 40', 75', 81'; Dinu 52'; Dumitrache 67'; Beckett 88' (o.g.)	Report

Stadionul Dinamo, Bucharest
Attendance: 12,000
Referee: Doğan Babacan (Turkey)

Dinamo București won 12–0 on aggregate.

3 October 1973

Galatasaray (Turkey)	0–1 (a.e.t.)	(Spain) Atlético Madrid
	Report	Salcedo 100'

İnönü Stadyumu
Attendance: 34,099
Referee: Günter Männig (East Germany)

Atletico Madrid won 1–0 on aggregate.

== Second round ==
Team 1	Agg.	Team 2	1st leg	2nd leg
Spartak Trnava (Czechoslovakia)	1–0	(Soviet Union) Zorya Voroshilovgrad	0–0	1–0
Benfica (Portugal)	1–3	(Hungary) Újpest	1–1	0–2
Bayern Munich (West Germany)	7–6	(East Germany) Dynamo Dresden	4–3	3–3
Ajax (Netherlands)	1–2	(Bulgaria) CSKA Sofia	1–0	0–2
Club Brugge (Belgium)	6–7	(Switzerland) Basel	2–1	4–6
Celtic (Scotland)	1–0	(Denmark) Vejle	0–0	1–0
Red Star Belgrade (Socialist Federal Republic of Yugoslavia)	4–2	(England) Liverpool	2–1	2–1
Dinamo București (Romania)	2–4	(Spain) Atlético Madrid	0–2	2–2

=== First leg ===
24 October 1973
14:30

Spartak Trnava (Czechoslovakia)	0–0	(Soviet Union) Zorya Voroshilovgrad
	Report

Stadion Spartak, Trnava
Attendance: 11,000
Referee: Marian Środecki (Poland)

24 October 1973

Benfica (Portugal)	1–1	(Hungary) Újpest
Eusébio 69'	Report	Tóth 57'

Estádio da Luz, Lisbon
Attendance: 32,368
Referee: Gerhard Schulenburg (West Germany)

24 October 1973

Bayern Munich (West Germany)	4–3	(East Germany) Dynamo Dresden
Hoffmann 17'; Dürnberger 26'; Roth 71'; Müller 83'	Report	Hansen 13' (o.g.); Sachse 36'; Heidler 42'

Olympiastadion, Munich
Attendance: 47,918
Referee: Davidson (Scotland)

24 October 1973
20:15

Ajax (Netherlands)	1–0	(Bulgaria) CSKA Sofia
Mulder 15'	Report

Olympisch Stadion, Amsterdam
Attendance: 21,762
Referee: John Gow(Wales)

24 October 1973

Club Brugge (Belgium)	2–1	(Switzerland) Basel
Carteus 7'; Thio 60' (pen.)	Report	Odermatt 39' (pen.)

De Klokke, Bruges
Attendance: 15,028
Referee: John Carpenter (Ireland)

24 October 1973

Celtic (Scotland)	0–0	(Denmark) Vejle
	Report

Celtic Park, Glasgow
Attendance: 30,000
Referee: Arie van Gemert (Netherlands)

24 October 1973

Red Star Belgrade (Socialist Federal Republic of Yugoslavia)	2–1	(England) Liverpool
Janković 39'; Bogićević 48'	Report	Lawler 72'

Marakana, Belgrade
Attendance: 21,500
Referee: Alfred Delcourt (Belgium)

24 October 1973

Dinamo București (Romania)	0–2	(Spain) Atlético Madrid
	Report	Bezerra 18'; Eusebio 88'

Stadionul Dinamo, Bucharest
Attendance: 10,000
Referee: Josef Bucek (Austria)

=== Second leg ===
7 November 1973
16:30

Zorya Voroshilovgrad (Soviet Union)	0–1	(Czechoslovakia) Spartak Trnava
	Report	Martinkovič 61'

Stadion Avanhard, Voroshilovgrad
Attendance: 19,000
Referee: Nicolae Rainea (Romania)

Spartak Trnava won 1–0 on aggregate.

7 November 1973

Újpest (Hungary)	2–0	(Portugal) Benfica
Bene 67'; Kolár 70'	Report

Megyeri úti Stadion, Budapest
Attendance: 26,440
Referee: Paolo Toselli (Italy)

Újpest won 3–1 on aggregate.

7 November 1973

Dynamo Dresden (East Germany)	3–3	(West Germany) Bayern Munich
Wätzlich 42'; Schade 52'; Häfner 56'	Report	Hoeneß 10', 12'; Müller 58'

Rudolf-Harbig-Stadion, Dresden
Attendance: 35,334
Referee: Robert Wurtz (France)

Bayern Munich won 7–6 on aggregate.

7 November 1973

CSKA Sofia (Bulgaria)	2–0 (a.e.t.)	(Netherlands) Ajax
Marashliev 68'; Mihaylov 116'	Report

Armiyata, Sofia
Attendance: 51,661
Referee: Anton Bucheli (Switzerland)

CSKA Sofia won 2–1 on aggregate.

7 November 1973

Basel (Switzerland)	6–4	(Belgium) Club Brugge
Rüssmann 19' (o.g.); Balmer 31'; Wampfler 37'; Hitzfeld 63' (pen.), 70', 87'	Report	Lambert 23', 46' (pen.), 68'; Carteus 28'

St. Jakob Stadium, Basel
Attendance: 12,236
Referee: Bent Nielsen (Denmark)

Basel won 7–6 on aggregate.

6 November 1973

Vejle (Denmark)	0–1	(Scotland) Celtic
	Report	Lennox 33'

Vejle Stadion, Vejle
Attendance: 18,600
Referee: Erik Axelryd (Sweden)

Celtic won 1–0 on aggregate.

6 November 1973

Liverpool (England)	1–2	(Socialist Federal Republic of Yugoslavia) Red Star Belgrade
Lawler 84'	Report	Lazarević 60'; Janković 90'

Anfield, Liverpool
Attendance: 41,744
Referee: Rudi Glöckner (East Germany)

Red Star Belgrade won 4–2 on aggregate.

7 November 1973

Atlético Madrid (Spain)	2–2	(Romania) Dinamo București
Ayala 10'; Capón 73'	Report	Lucescu 2'; Georgescu 13'

Vicente Calderón, Madrid
Attendance: 50,000
Referee: Jack Taylor (England)

Atlético Madrid won 4–2 on aggregate.

== Quarter-finals ==
Team 1	Agg.	Team 2	1st leg	2nd leg
Spartak Trnava (Czechoslovakia)	2–2 (3–4 p)	(Hungary) Újpest	1–1	1–1
Bayern Munich (West Germany)	5–3	(Bulgaria) CSKA Sofia	4–1	1–2
FC Basel (Switzerland)	5–6	(Scotland) Celtic	3–2	2–4
Red Star Belgrade (Socialist Federal Republic of Yugoslavia)	0–2	(Spain) Atlético Madrid	0–2	0–0

=== First leg ===
6 March 1974

Spartak Trnava (Czechoslovakia)	1–1	(Hungary) Újpest
Kabát 11'	Report	Tóth 70' (pen.)

Stadion Spartak, Trnava
Attendance: 28,116
Referee: D. W. Smith (England)

5 March 1974

Bayern Munich (West Germany)	4–1	(Bulgaria) CSKA Sofia
Torstensson 11', 88'; Beckenbauer 33'; Müller 65'	Report	Marashliev 23'

Olympiastadion, Munich
Attendance: 70,000
Referee: Pablo Sánchez Ibáñez (Spain)

27 February 1974

FC Basel (Switzerland)	3–2	(Scotland) Celtic
Hitzfeld 28', 64' (pen.); Odermatt 31'	Report	Wilson 21'; Dalglish 57'

St. Jakob Stadium, Basel
Attendance: 21,000
Referee: Günter Männig (East Germany)

6 March 1974

Red Star Belgrade (Socialist Federal Republic of Yugoslavia)	0–2	(Spain) Atlético Madrid
	Report	Aragonés 8'; Gárate 79'

Stadion Crvena Zvezda, Belgrade
Attendance: 54,661
Referee: Aurelio Angonese (Italy)

=== Second leg ===
20 March 1974

Újpest (Hungary)	1–1 (a.e.t.)	(Czechoslovakia) Spartak Trnava
Fekete 41'	Report	Adamec 36'
Penalties
Tóth (penalty scored); Horváth (penalty scored); Kellner (penalty missed); Bene (penalty scored); Zámbó (penalty scored)	4–3	(penalty scored) Adamec; (penalty missed) Dobiaš; (penalty scored) Hrušecký; (penalty scored) Ševčík; (penalty missed) Keketi

Megyeri úti Stadion, Budapest
Attendance: 32,181
Referee: Paul Schiller (Austria)

2–2 on aggregate; Újpest won on penalties.

20 March 1974

CSKA Sofia (Bulgaria)	2–1	(West Germany) Bayern Munich
Kolev 41' (pen.); Denev 48'	Report	Breitner 30' (pen.)

Armiyata, Sofia
Attendance: 52,000
Referee: John Carpenter (Republic of Ireland)

Bayern Munich won 5–3 on aggregate.

20 March 1974

Celtic (Scotland)	4–2 (a.e.t.)	(Switzerland) FC Basel
Dalglish 14'; Deans 18'; Callaghan 62'; Murray 114'	Report	Mundschin 33'; Balmer 48'

Celtic Park, Glasgow
Attendance: 71,000
Referee: Michel Kitabdjian (France)

Celtic won 6–5 on aggregate.

21 March 1974

Atlético Madrid (Spain)	0–0	(Socialist Federal Republic of Yugoslavia) Red Star Belgrade
	Report

Vicente Calderón, Madrid
Attendance: 45,000
Referee: Gerhard Schulenburg (West Germany)

Atlético Madrid won 2–0 on aggregate.

== Semi-finals ==
Team 1	Agg.	Team 2	1st leg	2nd leg
Újpest (Hungary)	1–4	(West Germany) Bayern Munich	1–1	0–3
Celtic (Scotland)	0–2	(Spain) Atlético Madrid	0–0	0–2

=== First leg ===
10 April 1974

Újpest (Hungary)	1–1	(West Germany) Bayern Munich
Fazekas 81'	Report	Torstensson 64'

Népstadion, Budapest
Attendance: 78,426
Referee: Sergio Gonella (Italy)

10 April 1974

Celtic (Scotland)	0–0	(Spain) Atlético Madrid
	Report

Celtic Park, Glasgow
Attendance: 72,461
Referee: Doğan Babacan (Turkey)

=== Second leg ===
24 April 1974

Bayern Munich (West Germany)	3–0	(Hungary) Újpest
Torstensson 33'; Horváth 70' (o.g.); Müller 81'	Report

Olympiastadion, Munich
Attendance: 72,628
Referee: Pavel Kazakov (USSR)

Bayern Munich won 4–1 on aggregate

24 April 1974

Atlético Madrid (Spain)	2–0	(Scotland) Celtic
Gárate 77'; Adelardo 87'	Report

Vicente Calderón, Madrid
Attendance: 64,000
Referee: Rudolf Scheurer (Switzerland)

Atlético Madrid won 2–0 on aggregate

== Final ==
15 May 1974

Atlético Madrid (Spain)	1–1 (a.e.t.)	(West Germany) Bayern Munich
Aragonés 114'	Report	Schwarzenbeck 120'

Heysel Stadium, Brussels
Attendance: 48,722
Referee: Vital Loraux (Belgium)

=== Replay ===
17 May 1974

Atlético Madrid (Spain)	0–4	(West Germany) Bayern Munich
	Report	Hoeneß 28', 83'; Müller 58', 71'

Heysel Stadium, Brussels
Attendance: 23,283
Referee: Alfred Delcourt (Belgium)

== Top scorers ==
Rank	Name	Team	Goals
1	(West Germany) Gerd Müller	(West Germany) Bayern Munich	8
2	(Belgium) Raoul Lambert	(Belgium) Club Brugge	6
2	(Sweden) Conny Torstensson	(Sweden) Åtvidaberg / (West Germany) Bayern Munich	6
4	(Romania) Dudu Georgescu	(Romania) Dinamo București	5
4	(West Germany) Ottmar Hitzfeld	(Switzerland) Basel	5
4	(West Germany) Uli Hoeneß	(West Germany) Bayern Munich	5
7	(Switzerland) Walter Balmer	(Switzerland) Basel	4
7	(Belgium) Pierre Carteus	(Belgium) Club Brugge	4
7	(Romania) Radu Nunweiller	(Romania) Dinamo București	4
10	(Scotland) Tommy Callaghan	(Scotland) Celtic	3
10	(Scotland) John Deans	(Scotland) Celtic	3
10	(Hungary) László Fazekas	(Hungary) Újpest	3
10	(Scotland) Jimmy Johnstone	(Scotland) Celtic	3
10	(Bulgaria) Dimitar Marashliev	(Bulgaria) CSKA Sofia	3
10	(Czechoslovakia) Stanislav Martinkovič	(Czechoslovakia) Spartak Trnava	3
