= 1974–75 in Swiss football =

Football in Switzerland
- Season: 1974–75

Men's football
- Nationalliga A: Zürich
- Nationalliga B: Biel-Bienne
- 1. Liga: 1. Liga champions FC Gossau; Group West: FC Bern; Group Central: SC Kriens; Group East: FC Gossau
- Swiss Cup: Basel
- Swiss League Cup: Grasshopper Club

Women's football
- Swiss Women's Super League: DFC Alpnach

The following is a summary of the 1974–75 season of competitive football in Switzerland.

== Nationalliga A ==
=== League table ===
Pos	Team	Pld	W	D	L	GF	GA	GD	Pts	Qualification
1	Zürich	26	19	1	6	63	19	+44	39	Swiss Champions, qualified for 1975–76 European Cup and entered 1975 Intertoto Cup
2	Young Boys	26	12	9	5	59	32	+27	33	Qualified for 1975–76 UEFA Cup and entered 1975 Intertoto Cup
3	Grasshopper Club	26	13	7	6	50	45	+5	33	Qualified for 1975–76 UEFA Cup and entered 1975 Intertoto Cup
4	Basel	26	11	9	6	49	33	+16	31	Swiss Cup winners, qualified for 1975–76 Cup Winners' Cup
5	FC Sion	26	12	7	7	45	30	+15	31	
6	Lausanne-Sport	26	10	9	7	40	35	+5	29	
7	Servette	26	10	7	9	43	35	+8	27	
8	Winterthur	26	9	8	9	36	31	+5	26	
9	Xamax	26	9	6	11	47	47	0	24	Entered 1975 Intertoto Cup
10	Lugano	26	8	6	12	34	40	−6	22	
11	Chênois	26	6	8	12	27	55	−28	20	
12	St. Gallen	26	6	8	12	42	72	−30	20	
13	Luzern	26	5	6	15	33	58	−25	16	Relegated to 1975–76 Nationalliga B
14	Vevey-Sports	26	3	7	16	31	67	−36	13	Relegated to 1975–76 Nationalliga B

Source: rsssf.com
Rules for classification: 1) Points; 2) Goal difference within the league, however with play-off for qualifiers;

== Nationalliga B ==
=== League table ===
Pos	Team	Pld	W	D	L	GF	GA	GD	Pts	Qualification or relegation
1	FC Biel-Bienne	26	14	6	6	57	31	+26	34	NLA Champions and promoted to 1975–76 Nationalliga A
2	FC La Chaux-de-Fonds	26	13	6	7	60	35	+25	32	To play-off for promotion
3	FC Chiasso	26	14	4	8	45	29	+16	32	To play-off for promotion
4	FC Nordstern Basel	26	13	6	7	48	38	+10	32	To play-off for promotion
5	Etoile Carouge FC	26	14	3	9	56	34	+22	31	
6	AC Bellinzona	26	12	7	7	47	30	+17	31	
7	FC Fribourg	26	13	5	8	38	33	+5	31	
8	FC Grenchen	26	12	4	10	36	36	0	28	
9	FC Aarau	26	10	5	11	42	45	−3	25	
10	FC Martigny-Sports	26	8	5	13	41	53	−12	21	
11	FC Wettingen	26	7	4	15	37	55	−18	18	To relegation play-out
12	Mendrisiostar	26	5	8	13	18	38	−20	18	To relegation play-out
13	FC Raron	26	4	10	12	19	40	−21	18	To relegation play-out
14	US Giubiasco	26	4	5	17	23	70	−47	13	Relegated to 1975–76 1. Liga

Source: rsssf.com
Rules for classification: 1) Points; 2) Goal difference within the league, however with play-off for qualifiers;

=== Promotion play-off ===
Pos	Team	Pld	W	D	L	GF	GA	GD	Pts	Qualification	CdF	NOR	CHI
1	FC La Chaux-de-Fonds	2	2	0	0	6	3	+3	4	Promoted to 1975–76 Nationalliga A	—	3–2	—
2	FC Nordstern Basel	2	0	1	1	3	4	−1	1		—	—	1–1
3	FC Chiasso	2	0	1	1	2	4	−2	1		1–3	—	—

Source: rsssf.com
Rules for classification: 1) Points; 2) Goal difference; 3) Goals scored; 4) Head-to-head points; 5) Away goals scored; 6) Draw.

=== Relegation play-out ===
Pos	Team	Pld	W	D	L	GF	GA	GD	Pts	Qualification or relegation	RAR	WET	MEN
1	FC Raron	1	1	0	0	1	0	+1	2		—	—	1–0
2	FC Wettingen	1	0	1	0	2	2	0	1		n/p	—	—
3	Mendrisiostar	2	0	1	1	2	3	−1	1	Relegated to 1975–76 1. Liga	—	2–2	—

Source: rsssf.com
Rules for classification: 1) Points; 2) Goal difference; 3) Goals scored; 4) Head-to-head points; 5) Away goals scored; 6) Draw.

Wettingen-Raron was not played (Mendrisiostar withdrew)

== 1. Liga ==
=== Group West ===
Pos	Team	Pld	W	D	L	GF	GA	GD	Pts	Qualification or relegation
1	FC Bern	24	16	4	4	48	18	+30	36	Play-off to Nationalliga B
2	Central Fribourg	24	12	6	6	43	26	+17	30	Play-off to Nationalliga B
3	FC Monthey	24	12	5	7	37	25	+12	29	
4	FC Dürrenast	24	9	8	7	49	34	+15	26	
5	FC Meyrin	24	9	8	7	32	23	+9	26	
6	FC Stade Nyonnais	24	10	5	9	33	33	0	25	
7	FC Boudry	24	10	5	9	32	35	−3	25	
8	FC Le Locle	24	8	7	9	34	40	−6	23	
9	FC Bulle	24	8	5	11	40	54	−14	21	
10	ASI Audax-Friul	24	8	4	12	26	45	−19	20	
11	FC Montreux-Sports	24	7	5	12	39	49	−10	19	
12	FC Sierre	24	4	8	12	24	33	−9	16	Relegation to 2. Liga Interregional
13	Yverdon-Sport FC	24	6	4	14	23	45	−22	16	Relegation to 2. Liga Interregional

Source: RSSSF
Rules for classification: 1) Points; 2) Goal difference within the league, but decider play-off for qualifiers; 3) Goals scored; 4) Head-to-head points; 5) Away goals scored; 6) Draw.

=== Group Central ===
Pos	Team	Pld	W	D	L	GF	GA	GD	Pts	Qualification or relegation
1	SC Kriens	24	11	10	3	43	22	+21	32	Play-off to Nationalliga B
2	FC Laufen	24	11	9	4	39	23	+16	31	Decider for play-off
3	SR Delémont	24	13	5	6	45	31	+14	31	Decider for play-off
4	FC Solothurn	24	12	5	7	39	25	+14	29	
5	US Boncourt	24	11	7	6	40	29	+11	29	
6	SC Buochs	24	9	7	8	41	39	+2	25	
7	FC Brunnen	24	8	6	10	32	31	+1	22	
8	SC Zug	24	10	2	12	34	38	−4	22	
9	FC Emmenbrücke	24	8	6	10	29	34	−5	22	
10	SC Kleinhüningen	24	7	8	9	34	46	−12	22	
11	FC Concordia Basel	24	6	9	9	31	38	−7	21	
12	FC Porrentruy	24	7	5	12	31	47	−16	19	Relegation to 2. Liga Interregional
13	FC Ebikon	24	1	5	18	22	57	−35	7	Relegation to 2. Liga Interregional

Source: RSSSF
Rules for classification: 1) Points; 2) Goal difference within the league, but decider play-off for qualifiers; 3) Goals scored; 4) Head-to-head points; 5) Away goals scored; 6) Draw.

==== Decider for second place ====
The decider match for second place was played on 1 June 1975 in Basel.

Team 1	Score	Team 2
SR Delémont	3–1	FC Laufen

SR Delémont win and advance to play-offs. FC Laufen remain in the division.

=== Group East ===
Pos	Team	Pld	W	D	L	GF	GA	GD	Pts	Qualification or relegation
1	FC Gossau	24	18	5	1	55	16	+39	41	Play-off to Nationalliga B
2	FC Young Fellows Zürich	24	17	3	4	69	31	+38	37	Play-off to Nationalliga B
3	FC Blue Stars Zürich	24	11	5	8	36	24	+12	27	
4	FC Chur	24	9	8	7	33	30	+3	26	
5	FC Frauenfeld	24	9	7	8	41	43	−2	25	
6	FC Baden	24	7	9	8	28	39	−11	23	
7	FC Locarno	24	6	10	8	26	26	0	22	
8	SC Brühl	24	7	7	10	35	31	+4	21	
9	FC Schaffhausen	24	7	7	10	38	39	−1	21	
10	FC Red Star Zürich	24	9	3	12	31	41	−10	21	
11	FC Tössfeld	24	9	3	12	25	38	−13	21	
12	FC Wil	24	5	8	11	28	43	−15	18	Relegation to 2. Liga Interregional
13	FC Uzwil	24	2	5	17	21	65	−44	9	Relegation to 2. Liga Interregional

Source: RSSSF
Rules for classification: 1) Points; 2) Goal difference within the league, but decider play-off for qualifiers; 3) Goals scored; 4) Head-to-head points; 5) Away goals scored; 6) Draw.

=== Promotion play-off ===
The three group winners played a two legged tie against one of the runners-up to decide the three finalists. The games were played on 1, 5, 8 and 15 June.

==== First round ====
Team 1	Score	Team 2
FC Young Fellows Zürich	2–2	SC Kriens
SC Kriens	0–2	FC Young Fellows Zürich

FC Young Fellows Zürich win 4–2 on aggregate and continue to the finals.

Team 1	Score	Team 2
Central Fribourg	3–2	FC Gossau
FC Gossau	3–0	Central Fribourg

FC Gossau win 5–3 on aggregate and continue to the finals.

Team 1	Score	Team 2
SR Delémont	0–1	FC Bern
FC Bern	2–0	SR Delémont

FC Bern win 3–0 on aggregate and continue to the finals.

==== Final round ====
The three first round winners competed in a single round-robin to decide the two promotion slots. The games were played on 15, 22 and 29 June.

Pos	Team	Pld	W	D	L	GF	GA	GD	Pts	Qualification	GOS	YFJ	BER
1	FC Gossau	2	1	1	0	6	2	+4	3	Promoted to Nationalliga B	—	—	1–1
2	FC Young Fellows Zürich	2	1	0	1	2	5	−3	2	Promoted to Nationalliga B	1–5	—	—
3	FC Bern	2	0	1	1	1	2	−1	1		—	0–1	—

Source: RSSSF
Rules for classification: 1) Points; 2) Goal difference within the league; 3) Goals scored; 4) Head-to-head points; 5) Away goals scored; 6) Draw.

FC Gossau are 1. Liga champions, FC Young Fellows Zürich are runners-up and these two teams are promoted.

== Swiss Cup ==
The competition was played in a knockout system. In the case of a draw, extra time was played. If the teams were still level after extra time, the match was replayed at the away team's ground. In case of a draw after extra time, the replay was to be decided with a penalty shoot-out. The Quarter- and Semi-finals were played as two legged rounds, home and away. The final was held in Bern.

=== Early rounds ===
The routes of the finalists to the final were:

- Third round: NLA teams with a bye.
- Fourth round: Chiasso-Basel 0:1. Nordstern-Winterthur 2:5 (a.e.t.).
- Fifth round: Zürich-Basel 1:3. Kriens-Winterthur 1:2.
- Quarter-finals: First leg: Etoile Carouge-Basel 1:2. Return leg: Basel-Etoile Carouge 2:1 (agg. 4:2). First leg: Grenchen-Winterthur 2:0. Return leg: Winterthur-Grenchen 2:0 (agg. 2:2), Winterthur won 3:2 (p).
- Semi-finals: First leg: Chênois-Basel 1:4. Return leg: Basel-Chênois 2:1 (agg. 6:2). First leg: Winterthur-YB 2:1. Return leg: YB-Winterthur 0:0 (agg. 1:2)

=== Final ===
31 March 1975
14:30
Final

Basel	2 – 1 (a.e.t.)	Winterthur
Demarmels 48'; Balmer 115'	Summary	66' E. Meyer

Wankdorf Stadium, Bern
Attendance: 28,000
Referee: (Switzerland) Gérard Racine Biel/Bienne

== Swiss League Cup ==
The League Cup was played in a knockout system with all 28 league clubs plus four selected teams from the 1. Liga. In the case of a draw, extra time was played. If the teams were still level after extra time, the decision was brought about with a penalty shoot-out. The final was played in Zürich.

=== Early rounds ===
The routes of the finalists to the final were:

- First round: Frauenfeld-GC 0:2. Zürich-Winterthur 3:0
- Second round: Chiasso-GC 1:4. Bellinzona-Zürich 1:4
- Quarter-finals: GC-Vevey 4:1. Etoile Carouge-Zürich 2:3.
- Semi-finals: Basel-GC 1:3. Zürich-Xamax 5:1.

=== Final ===
26 March 1975

Grasshopper Club	3–0	Zürich
Grahn 8'; Elsener 54'; Bosco 75'	Summary

Letzigrund, Zürich
Attendance: 8,500
Referee: (Switzerland) Walter Hungerbühler (St. Gallen)

== Swiss Clubs in Europe ==
- Zürich as 1973–74 Nationalliga A champions: 1974–75 European Cup and entered 1974 Intertoto Cup
- Sion as 1973–74 Swiss Cup winners: 1974–75 Cup Winners' Cup and entered 1974 Intertoto Cup
- Grasshopper Club as league runners-up: 1974–75 UEFA Cup
- Servette as league third placed team: 1974–75 UEFA Cup
- Winterthur: entered 1974 Intertoto Cup
- Xamax: entered 1974 Intertoto Cup

=== Zürich ===
==== European Cup ====
===== First round =====
18 September 1974 First leg	Leeds United (England)	4–1	(Switzerland) FC Zürich	Elland Road, Leeds
	Clarke 15', 42'; Lorimer 25' (pen.); Jordan 48'	Report	Katić 89'	Attendance: 20,012; Referee: Jan Keizer (Netherlands)

2 October 1974 Second leg	FC Zürich (Switzerland)	2–1	(England) Leeds United	Letzigrund, Zürich
	Katić 37'; Rutschmann 42' (pen.)	Report	Clarke 36'	Attendance: 13,382; Referee: Sergio Gonella (Italy)

Leeds United won 5–3 on aggregate.

==== Intertoto Cup ====
===== Group 1 =====
Pos	Team	Pld	W	D	L	GF	GA	GD	Pts	ZÜR	HER	ÖST	SAL
1	(Switzerland) Zürich	6	5	1	0	14	5	+9	11	—	3–2	1–0	5–2
2	(West Germany) Hertha Berlin	6	3	1	2	10	7	+3	7	1–1	—	1–0	2–0
3	(Sweden) Öster	6	2	0	4	7	8	−1	4	0–2	2–4	—	3–0
4	Austria Salzburg	6	1	0	5	3	14	−11	2	0–2	1–0	0–2	—

Source: mogiel.net
Rules for classification: 1) Points; 2) Goal difference; 3) Goals scored; 4) Head-to-head points; 5) Away goals scored; 6) Draw.

15 June 1974 Matchday 1	Zürich (Switzerland)	3–2	(West Germany) Hertha Berlin	Letzigrund, Zürich
20:15	Schweizer 18' (1:0); Rutschmann 35' (2:1); Schweizer 77' (2:1)	FCZ summary	30' (pen 1:1) Müller; 85' (3:2) Brück; (yellow card) Müller	Attendance: 1,800; Referee: (Switzerland) Anton Bucheli (Luzern)

29 June 1974 Matchday 2	Austria Salzburg	0–2	(Switzerland) Zürich	Lehener Stadion, Salzburg
		FCZ summary	31' (0:1) Botteron; 78' (0:2) Katić	Attendance: 800; Referee: (Austria) Josef Jegel

7 July 1974 Matchday 3	Öster (Sweden)	0–2	(Switzerland) Zürich	Växjö
		FCZ summary	46' (0:1) Martinelli; 89' (pen 0:2) Rutschmann	Attendance: 307; Referee: (Sweden) Erik Fredriksson

13 July 1974 Matchday 4	Hertha Berlin (West Germany)	1–1	(Switzerland) Zürich	Herzogenaurach
	Horr 88' (1:1)	FCZ summary	70' (0:1) Marti	Attendance: 700

20 July 1974 Matchday 5	Zürich (Switzerland)	5–2	Austria Salzburg	Letzigrund, Zürich
	Katić 3' (1:0); 4' (2:0); Botteron 42' (3:1); Katić 54' (4:1); Martinelli 78' (5:2)	FCZ summary	8' (2:1) Libuda; 55' (4:2) Hala; (yellow card) Schwarz	Attendance: 2,000; Referee: (Switzerland) Meier

28 July 1974 Matchday 6	Zürich (Switzerland)	1–0	(Sweden) Öster	Scharten, Baden
	Rutschmann 53' (pen 1:0)	FCZ summary		Attendance: 2,100; Referee: (Switzerland) Jean Dubach (Nidau)

=== Grasshopper Club ===
==== UEFA Cup ====
===== First round =====
18 September 1974 First leg	Grasshopper Club (Switzerland)	2–0	(Greece) Panathinaikos	Hardturm, Zürich
	Elsener 2'; Grahn 83'	Report		Attendance: 8,200; Referee: Zdeněk Jelínek (Czechoslovakia)

3 October 1974 Second leg	Panathinaikos (Greece)	2–1	(Switzerland) Grasshopper Club	Leoforos Alexandras Stadium, Athens
	Antoniadis 74', 82'	Report	Santrač 8'	Attendance: 13,070; Referee: Gheorge Limona (Romania)

Grasshopper Club won 3–2 on aggregate.

===== Second round =====
23 October 1974 First leg	Grasshopper Club (Switzerland)	2–1	(Spain) Real Zaragoza	Hardturm, Zürich
	Grahn 31'; Santrač 89'	Report	Arrúa 54'	Attendance: 6,500; Referee: Heinz Einbeck (East Germany)

6 November 1974 Second leg	Real Zaragoza (Spain)	5–0	(Switzerland) Grasshopper Club	La Romareda, Zaragoza
	Rubial 12', 65'; Soto 20'; Ohlhauser 48' (o.g.); Niggl 88' (o.g.)	Report		Attendance: 20,000; Referee: Theo Boosten (Netherlands)

Real Zaragoza won 6–2 on aggregate.

==== Intertoto Cup ====
===== Group 5 =====
Pos	Team	Pld	W	D	L	GF	GA	GD	Pts	SLO	KAI	GCZ	ÅTV
1	(Czechoslovakia) Slovan Bratislava	6	5	0	1	9	1	+8	10	—	1–0	4–0	1–0
2	(West Germany) Kaiserslautern	6	2	2	2	8	9	−1	6	1–0	—	3–3	1–0
3	(Switzerland) Grasshopper Club	6	2	1	3	9	12	−3	5	0–1	3–1	—	3–2
4	(Sweden) Åtvidaberg	6	1	1	4	5	9	−4	3	0–2	2–2	1–0	—

Source: mogiel.net
Rules for classification: 1) Points; 2) Goal difference; 3) Goals scored; 4) Head-to-head points; 5) Away goals scored; 6) Draw.

=== Servette ===
==== UEFA Cup ====
===== First round =====
18 September 1974 First leg	Derby County (England)	4–1	(Switzerland) Servette	Baseball Ground, Derby
	Hector 14', 47'; Daniel 38'; Lee 44'	Report	Petrović 71'	Attendance: 17,716; Referee: Antonio Rigo Sureda (Spain)

2 October 1974 Second leg	Servette (Switzerland)	1–2	(England) Derby County	Charmilles Stadium, Geneva
	Martin 19'	Report	Lee 46'; Hector 72'	Attendance: 9,590; Referee: Franz Wöhrer (Austria)

Derby County won 6–2 on aggregate.

=== Winterthur ===
==== Intertoto Cup ====
===== Group 7 =====
Pos	Team	Pld	W	D	L	GF	GA	GD	Pts	DUI	GÓR	WIN	HVI
1	(West Germany) Duisburg	6	4	1	1	24	10	+14	9	—	6–1	4–0	6–2
2	(Poland) Górnik Zabrze	6	2	2	2	14	17	−3	6	3–3	—	1–3	3–0
3	(Switzerland) Winterthur	6	2	1	3	11	15	−4	5	2–4	3–4	—	1–0
4	(Denmark) Hvidovre	6	1	2	3	8	15	−7	4	2–1	2–2	2–2	—

Source: mogiel.net
Rules for classification: 1) Points; 2) Goal difference; 3) Goals scored; 4) Head-to-head points; 5) Away goals scored; 6) Draw.

=== Xamax ===
==== Intertoto Cup ====
===== Group =====
Pos	Team	Pld	W	D	L	GF	GA	GD	Pts	HAM	VIT	DJU	NEU
1	(West Germany) Hamburg	6	5	0	1	14	6	+8	10	—	2–0	2–0	5–2
2	(Portugal) Vitória Guimarães	6	4	0	2	15	8	+7	8	3–1	—	5–0	5–2
3	(Sweden) Djurgården	6	2	1	3	9	14	−5	5	1–3	3–1	—	4–2
4	(Switzerland) Xamax	6	0	1	5	7	17	−10	1	0–1	0–1	1–1	—

Source: mogiel.net
Rules for classification: 1) Points; 2) Goal difference; 3) Goals scored; 4) Head-to-head points; 5) Away goals scored; 6) Draw.

== Sources ==
- Switzerland 1974–75 at RSSSF
- League Cup finals at RSSSF
- European Competitions 1974–75 at RSSSF.com
- Cup finals at Fussball-Schweiz
- Intertoto history at Pawel Mogielnicki's Page
- Josef Zindel (2018). FC Basel 1893. Die ersten 125 Jahre (in German). Basel: Friedrich Reinhardt Verlag. ISBN 978-3-7245-2305-5.

Preceded by 1973–74	Seasons in Swiss football	Succeeded by 1975–76
