= 1973 Swiss League Cup =

Tournament details
- Country: Switzerland
- Teams: 28

Final positions
- Champions: Grasshopper Club
- Runners-up: Winterthur

Tournament statistics
- Matches played: 35

The 1973 Swiss League Cup was the second Swiss League Cup competition. It was played in summer 1973 as a pre-season tournament to the 1973–74 Swiss football season. It was won by Grasshopper Club Zürich who defeated FC Winterthur 5–4 on penalties after a 2–2 draw in the final.

== Overview ==
The League Cup was created to allow clubs from the top two tiers to compete in a tournament in advance of the league season. There was a seeding, the top eight teams from last seasons Nationalliga A were directly qualified for the round of 16. The other six teams from the top-tier and all the teams from the second-tier played a qualification round. As opposed to in the inaugural version last season, where the teams were divided into regional groups to play a round-robin, this year the 20 teams were drawn in a two-legged elimination tournament, yet only the best eight winners qualified for the round of 16. In the main competition, the matches were played in a single knockout format. In the event of a draw after 90 minutes, the match went into extra time. In the event of a draw at the end of extra time, a penalty shoot-out was foreseen.

== Qualification round ==
The first legs were played on 16 June and the return legs were played on 23 June 1973.

=== Summary ===
Team 1	Agg.	Team 2	1st leg	2nd leg
Grenchen	10–2	Brühl St. Gallen	6–1	4–1
Mendrisiostar	5–1	Chiasso	4–1	1–0
Biel-Bienne	9–4	Martigny-Sports	8–1	1–3
St. Gallen	7–4	Wettingen	2–2	5–2
Buochs	4–4	Young Fellows Zürich	3–2	1–2
Luzern	11–1	Bellinzona	6–1	5–0
Chênois	1–6	Fribourg	1–4	0–2
Xamax	9–5	La Chaux-de-Fonds	5–2	4–3
Young Boys	5–4	Aarau	1–2	4–2
Vevey-Sports	6–2	Étoile Carouge	4–0	2–2

- The best eight winners qualified. Buochs and Young Boys did not qualify.

=== Matches ===
16 June 1973
First leg

Young Boys	1–2	Aarau
Brechbühl 83' (1:2)	YB summary FCA summary	44' (0:1) Osterwalder; 50' (0:2) Osterwalder

Wankdorf Stadium, Bern
Attendance: 1,200
Referee: (Switzerland) Anton Bucheli (Luzern)

23 June 1973
Return leg

Aarau	2–4	Young Boys
Züttel 32' (1:2); Züttel 80' (2:4)	FCA summary YB summary	25' (0:1) Zahnd; 30' (0:2) Cornioley; 60' (1:3) Muhmenthaler; 61' (1:4) Bruttin

Stadion Brügglifeld, Aarau
Attendance: 629
Referee: (Switzerland) Adolf Schumacher (Lucerne)

== Round of 16 ==
=== Summary ===
Team 1	Score	Team 2
11 August 1973
Biel-Bienne	2–1	Lausanne-Sport
Lugano	3–0	Grenchen
Xamax	4–1	Basel
Sion	0–2	Servette
Vevey-Sports	2–1	Fribourg
Winterthur	1–0	Luzern
Zürich	1–1 (a.e.t.) (3–4 p)	Grasshopper Club
St. Gallen	2–0	Mendrisiostar

=== Matches ===
11 August 1973
20:15

Neuchâtel Xamax	4–1	Basel
Rub 10' (1:0); Citherlet 29' (2:1); Richard (yellow card) 33'; Elsig 38' (3:1); Richard 68' (4:1)	FCB summary	(yellow card) 3' Hitzfeld; 15' (1:1) Rahmen

Stade de la Maladière, Neuchâtel
Attendance: 6,000
Referee: (Switzerland) André Favre (Echallens)

11 August 1973

Sion	0–2	Servette
	Servette summary	23' (0:1) Petrović; 54' (0:2) Pfister

Stade Tourbillon, Sion
Attendance: 3,500
Referee: (Switzerland) Fernand Burioli (Lausanne)

11 August 1973

Zürich	1–1 (a.e.t.)	Grasshopper Club
Kuhn 83' (pen 1:1)	FCZ summary	21' (0:1) Grahn
Penalties
Kuhn (penalty missed); Jeandupeux (penalty missed); Bionda (penalty scored); Botteron (penalty scored); Zigerlig (penalty scored)	3–4	(penalty missed) Gross; (penalty scored) Noventa; (penalty scored) Meier; (penalty scored) Winiger; (penalty scored) Grahn

Letzigrund, Zürich
Attendance: 11,000
Referee: (Switzerland) Hans Wieland (Grenchen)

== Quarter-finals ==
=== Summary ===
Team 1	Score	Team 2
14 August 1973
Vevey-Sports	1–4	Grasshopper Club
Lugano	2–4	Servette
Xamax	1–2	Biel-Bienne
St. Gallen	1–2	Winterthur

=== Matches ===
14 August 1973

Vevey-Sports	1–4	Grasshopper Club
Lambelet 53' (1:2)	RSSSF summary	23' (0:1) Noventa; 45' (0:2) Grahn; 61' (1:3) Grahn; 73' (1:4) Elsener

Stade de Copet, Vevey

14 August 1973

Lugano	2–4	Servette
Lubanski 3' (1:0); Luttrop 73' (2:2)	Servette summary	5' (1:1) Petrović; 31' (1:2) Petrović; 87' (2:3) Schnyder; 89' (2:4) Riner

Cornaredo, Lugano
Attendance: 2,400
Referee: (Switzerland) Anton Bucheli (Luzern)

14 August 1973

Xamax	1–2	Biel-Bienne
Citherlet 2' (1:0)	RSSSF summary	54' (1:1) Peters; 75' (1:2) Gobet

Stade de la Maladière, Neuchâtel
Attendance: 5,300
Referee: (Switzerland) Ulysse Darbellay (Roche, Vaud)

14 August 1973

St. Gallen	1–2	Winterthur
Blättler 78' (1:1)	RSSSF summary	38' (0:1) Risi; 90' (1:2) Grünig

Espenmoos, St. Gallen
Attendance: 4,600
Referee: (Switzerland) Jean Dubach (Nidau)

== Semi-finals ==
=== Summary ===
Team 1	Score	Team 2
8 September 1973
Grasshopper Club	2–0	Servette
12 September 1973
Biel-Bienne	0–3	Winterthur

=== Matches ===
8 September 1973

Grasshopper Club	2–0	Servette
Grahn 30' (1:0) (Marchi) 43' (o.g.)	Servette summary

Hardturm, Zürich
Attendance: 4,000
Referee: (Switzerland) Karl Keller (Basel)

12 September 1973

Biel-Bienne	0–3	Winterthur
	RSSSF summary	51' (0:1) Meili; 80' (0:2) Nielsen; 82' (0:3) Künzli

Gurzelen Stadion, Biel/Bienne
Attendance: 3,100
Referee: (Switzerland) Pierre Despont (Lausanne)

== Final ==
=== Summary ===
The final took place on Wednesday 10 October 1973 at Letzigrund in Zürich.

Team 1	Score	Team 2
10 October 1973
Grasshopper Club	2–2 (a.e.t.) (5–4 p)	Winterthur

=== Telegram ===
10 October 1973

Grasshopper Club	2–2 (a.e.t.)	Winterthur
Elsener 71' (1:2); Ohlhauser 76' (2:2)	RSSSF summary	25' (0:1) Risi; 66' (0:2) Risi
Penalties
Winiger (penalty scored); Meier (penalty scored); T. Niggl (penalty scored); Gröbli (penalty scored); Grahn (penalty scored)	5–4	(penalty scored) Fehr; (penalty missed) Nielsen; (penalty scored) Arnold; (penalty scored) Risi; (penalty scored) Küng

Letzigrund, Zürich
Attendance: 3,700
Referee: (Switzerland) Anton Bucheli (Luzern)

Grasshopper Club won the cup and this was the club's first League Cup title to this date.

== Further in Swiss football ==
- 1973–74 Nationalliga A
- 1973–74 Swiss 1. Liga
- 1973–74 Swiss Cup
