= 1976–77 in Swiss football =

Football in Switzerland
- Season: 1976–77

Men's football
- Nationalliga A: Basel
- Nationalliga B: Etoile Carouge
- 1. Liga: 1. Liga champions: FC Wettingen; Group 1: FC Bulle; Group 2: FC Bern; Group 3: FC Wettingen; Group 4: SC Zug
- Swiss Cup: Young Boys
- Swiss League Cup: Servette

Women's football
- Swiss Women's Super League: DFC Sion
- Swiss Cup: DFC Sion

The following is a summary of the 1976–77 season of competitive football in Switzerland.

== Nationalliga A ==
=== Qualifying stage ===
Pos	Team	Pld	W	D	L	GF	GA	GD	Pts	Qualification
1	Servette	22	14	7	1	68	27	+41	35	To championship round halved points (rounded up) as bonus
2	Basel	22	14	5	3	54	30	+24	33	To championship round halved points (rounded up) as bonus
3	Zürich	22	12	7	3	49	18	+31	31	To championship round halved points (rounded up) as bonus
4	Neuchâtel Xamax	22	10	7	5	37	27	+10	27	To championship round halved points (rounded up) as bonus
5	Young Boys	22	8	9	5	37	34	+3	25	To championship round halved points (rounded up) as bonus
6	Grasshopper Club	22	7	8	7	41	28	+13	22	To championship round halved points (rounded up) as bonus
7	Lausanne-Sport	22	8	6	8	39	31	+8	22	To relegation play-out round halved points (rounded up) as bonus
8	Chênois	22	6	8	8	29	39	−10	20	To relegation play-out round halved points (rounded up) as bonus
9	Sion	22	4	10	8	19	32	−13	18	To relegation play-out round halved points (rounded up) as bonus
10	St. Gallen	22	5	6	11	26	40	−14	16	To relegation play-out round halved points (rounded up) as bonus
11	Bellinzona	22	3	2	17	19	73	−54	8	To relegation play-out round halved points (rounded up) as bonus
12	Winterthur	22	1	5	16	19	58	−39	7	To relegation play-out round halved points (rounded up) as bonus

Source: rsssf.com
Rules for classification: 1) Points; 2) Goal difference; 3) Goals scored;

=== Championship table ===
Pos	Team	Pld	W	D	L	GF	GA	GD	BP	Pts	Qualification
1	Basel	10	5	2	3	19	16	+3	17	29	Championship winners, qualified for 1977–78 European Cup
2	Servette	10	5	1	4	16	14	+2	18	29	Play-off losers, qualified for 1977–78 UEFA Cup
3	Zürich	10	5	1	4	24	18	+6	16	27	qualified for 1977–78 UEFA Cup and entered 1977 Intertoto Cup
4	Grasshopper Club	10	5	2	3	15	10	+5	11	23	qualified for 1977–78 UEFA Cup and entered 1977 Intertoto Cup
5	Xamax	10	3	1	6	14	18	−4	14	21	
6	Young Boys	10	3	1	6	12	24	−12	13	20	Swiss Cup winners, qualified for 1977–78 Cup Winners' Cup and entered 1977 Intertoto Cup

Source: rsssf.com
Rules for classification: 1) Points; 2) Goal difference within the league, but play-off for the title.

==== Championship play-off ====
28 June 1977
20:15
Play-Off

Basel	2–1	Servette
Mundschin 37' von Wartburg 75'	FCB report	30' Müller; (yellow card) 66' Thouvenel; (yellow card) 77' Guyot

Wankdorf Stadium, Bern
Attendance: 55,000
Referee: (Switzerland) Ruedi Renggli

=== Relegation play-out ===
Pos	Team	Pld	W	D	L	GF	GA	GD	BP	Pts	Qualification or relegation
1	Lausanne-Sport	10	7	3	0	24	7	+17	11	28	
2	Chênois	10	5	4	1	24	13	+11	10	24	Entered 1977 Intertoto Cup
3	Sion	10	5	0	5	18	17	+1	9	19	
4	St. Gallen	10	3	2	5	18	19	−1	8	16	
5	Winterthur	10	3	3	4	11	14	−3	4	13	Relegated to 1977–78 Nationalliga B
6	Bellinzona	10	0	2	8	7	32	−25	4	6	Relegated to 1977–78 Nationalliga B

Source: rsssf.com
Rules for classification: 1) Points; 2) Goal difference; 3) Goals scored;

== Nationalliga B ==
=== Final league table ===
Pos	Team	Pld	W	D	L	GF	GA	GD	Pts	Relegation
1	Etoile Carouge	30	19	6	5	58	32	+26	44	Champions promoted to 1978–79 Nationalliga A
2	FC Young Fellows Zürich	30	15	11	4	52	25	+27	41	Promoted to 1978–79 Nationalliga A
3	Nordstern Basel	30	15	10	5	53	28	+25	40	
4	Lugano	30	13	9	8	37	30	+7	35	
5	FC Chiasso	30	12	10	8	37	24	+13	34	
6	La Chaux-de-Fonds	30	14	5	11	55	41	+14	33	
7	FC Grenchen	30	11	11	8	31	29	+2	33	
8	SC Kriens	30	11	7	12	42	45	−3	29	
9	Luzern	30	9	10	11	35	43	−8	28	
10	Vevey-Sports	30	9	8	13	38	47	−9	26	
11	FC Fribourg	30	7	12	11	32	42	−10	26	
12	FC Gossau	30	8	8	14	30	44	−14	24	
13	FC Aarau	30	9	5	16	34	43	−9	23	
14	FC Biel-Bienne	30	6	10	14	30	49	−19	22	
15	Mendrisiostar	30	8	5	17	28	46	−18	21	Relegated to 1978–79 1. Liga
16	FC Raron	30	7	7	16	28	52	−24	21	Relegated to 1978–79 1. Liga

Source: rsssf.com
Rules for classification: 1) Points; 2) Goal difference within the league, but decider play-off for qualifiers; 3) Goals scored;

== 1. Liga ==
=== Group 1 ===
Pos	Team	Pld	W	D	L	GF	GA	GD	Pts	Qualification or relegation
1	FC Bulle	22	14	3	5	42	25	+17	31	Play-off to Nationalliga B
2	FC Stade Lausanne	22	13	4	5	46	24	+22	30	Play-off to Nationalliga B
3	FC Stade Nyonnais	22	12	4	6	37	27	+10	28	
4	FC Monthey	22	11	4	7	38	29	+9	26	
5	Central Fribourg	22	10	4	8	32	24	+8	24	
6	FC Meyrin	22	6	11	5	25	23	+2	23	
7	FC Fétigny	22	10	3	9	39	43	−4	23	
8	FC Orbe	22	8	6	8	40	37	+3	22	
9	FC Martigny-Sports	22	6	9	7	34	26	+8	21	
10	FC Boudry	22	5	6	11	25	36	−11	16	
11	FC Renens	22	4	4	14	28	57	−29	12	
12	FC Sierre	22	2	4	16	20	55	−35	8	Relegation to 2. Liga Interregional

Source: RSSSF
Rules for classification: 1) Points; 2) Goal difference within the league, but decider play-off for qualifiers.

=== Group 2 ===
Pos	Team	Pld	W	D	L	GF	GA	GD	Pts	Qualification or relegation
1	FC Bern	22	17	4	1	53	20	+33	38	Play-off to Nationalliga B
2	FC Köniz	22	11	9	2	41	18	+23	31	Play-off to Nationalliga B
3	FC Aurore Bienne	22	12	5	5	53	25	+28	29	
4	FC Le Locle	22	8	11	3	38	33	+5	27	
5	FC Solothurn	22	8	4	10	26	32	−6	20	
6	FC Dürrenast	22	6	7	9	26	30	−4	19	
7	US Boncourt	22	7	5	10	32	34	−2	19	
8	FC Lerchenfeld	22	8	3	11	34	46	−12	19	
9	SR Delémont	22	6	6	10	25	27	−2	18	
10	ASI Audax-Friul	22	5	6	11	20	42	−22	16	
11	SC Derendingen	22	5	5	12	26	45	−19	15	
12	FC Superga	22	5	3	14	25	47	−22	13	Relegation to 2. Liga Interregional

Source: RSSSF
Rules for classification: 1) Points; 2) Goal difference within the league, but decider play-off for qualifiers.

=== Group 3 ===
Pos	Team	Pld	W	D	L	GF	GA	GD	Pts	Qualification or relegation
1	FC Wettingen	22	16	3	3	59	14	+45	35	Play-off to Nationalliga B
2	FC Laufen	22	13	7	2	40	17	+23	33	Play-off to Nationalliga B
3	FC Frauenfeld	22	13	4	5	39	30	+9	30	
4	FC Concordia Basel	22	9	4	9	36	38	−2	22	
5	FC Schaffhausen	22	8	5	9	33	35	−2	21	
6	SV Muttenz	22	9	3	10	35	38	−3	21	
7	SC Brühl	22	8	4	10	33	39	−6	20	
8	FC Red Star Zürich	22	6	7	9	37	39	−2	19	
9	FC Baden	22	7	4	11	26	43	−17	18	
10	FC Blue Stars Zürich	22	6	5	11	26	30	−4	17	
11	FC Birsfelden	22	6	4	12	26	33	−7	16	
12	SC Kleinhüningen	22	4	4	14	21	55	−34	12	Relegation to 2. Liga Interregional

Source: RSSSF
Rules for classification: 1) Points; 2) Goal difference within the league, but decider play-off for qualifiers.

=== Group 4 ===
Pos	Team	Pld	W	D	L	GF	GA	GD	Pts	Qualification or relegation
1	SC Zug	22	11	9	2	46	28	+18	31	Play-off to Nationalliga B
2	FC Chur	22	10	7	5	51	36	+15	27	To decider for second place
3	FC Zug	22	11	5	6	42	34	+8	27	To decider for second place
4	FC Balzers	22	9	6	7	55	45	+10	24	
5	SC Buochs	22	7	9	6	41	38	+3	23	
6	FC Unterstrass	22	8	7	7	39	37	+2	23	
7	FC Glattbrugg	22	8	7	7	41	42	−1	23	
8	FC Brunnen	22	8	4	10	34	39	−5	20	
9	FC Locarno	22	7	6	9	27	38	−11	20	
10	FC Ibach	22	5	6	11	37	42	−5	16	
11	FC Morbio	22	4	7	11	24	38	−14	15	To decider against relegation
12	FC Rüti	22	3	9	10	29	49	−20	15	To decider against relegation

Source: RSSSF
Rules for classification: 1) Points; 2) Goal difference within the league, but decider play-off for qualifiers.

==== Decider for second place ====
The decider match for second place was played on 24 May in Küsnacht.

Team 1	Score	Team 2
FC Zug	3–1	FC Chur

FC Zug win and advance to play-offs. FC Chur remain in the division.

==== Decider for eleventh place ====
The decider was played on 30 May in Brunnen.

Team 1	Score	Team 2
FC Morbio	1–1	FC Rüti

The game was drawn, however, at this period in time, the extra-time as match extension had not yet been introduced. FC Morbio were declaired winners due to goal-average of the regular season and, therefore, they remained in the division and FC Rüti were relegated to 2. Liga Interregional.

=== Promotion play-off ===
==== Qualification round ====
Team 1	Score	Team 2
SC Zug	1–1	FC Laufen
FC Laufen	1–0	SC Zug

FC Laufen win 2–1 on aggregate and continue to the finals.

Team 1	Score	Team 2
FC Bern	2–0	FC Zug
FC Zug	1–1	FC Bern

FC Bern win 3–1 on aggregate and continue to the finals.

Team 1	Score	Team 2
FC Bulle	3–0	FC Köniz
FC Köniz	2–2	FC Bulle

FC Bulle win 5–2 on aggregate and continue to the finals.

Team 1	Score	Team 2
FC Wettingen	1–0	FC Stade Lausanne
FC Stade Lausanne	0–2	FC Wettingen

FC Wettingen win 3–0 on aggregate and continue to the finals.

==== Final round ====
The games were played on 12 and 19 June.

Team 1	Score	Team 2
FC Bulle	4–0	FC Bern
FC Bern	2–1	FC Bulle

FC Bulle win 5–2 on aggregate and are promoted to 1977–78 Nationalliga B.

Team 1	Score	Team 2
FC Laufen	1–3	FC Wettingen
FC Wettingen	2–0	FC Laufen

FC Wettingen win 5–1 on aggregate and are promoted to 1977–78 Nationalliga B.

==== Decider for 1. Liga championship ====
The final for the league championship was played on 22 June in Wettingen.

Team 1	Score	Team 2
FC Wettingen	5–2	FC Bulle

FC Wettingen win and are 1. Liga champions.

== Swiss Cup ==
The competition was played in a knockout system. In the case of a draw, extra time was played. If the teams were still level after extra time, the match was replayed at the away team's ground. In case of a draw after extra time, the replay was to be decided with a penalty shoot-out. The final was held in Bern.

=== Early rounds ===
The routes of the finalists to the final were:

- Third round: NLA teams with a bye.
- Fourth round: Lerchenfeld YB 3:6. Adliswil St. Gallen 0:6.
- Fifth round: YB La Chaux-de-Fonds 6:3. Winterthur St. Gallen 0:1.
- Quarterfinals: YB Zürich 2:1. St. Gallen Sion 1:0 (a.e.t.).
- Semi-final: Lausanne YB 0:1 (a.e.t.). St. Gallen Etoile Carouge 0:0 (a.e.t.). replay: Etoile Carouge St. Gallen 2:4.

=== Final ===
Easter Monday 11 April 1977
15:00
Final

Young Boys	1–0	St. Gallen
Andersen 76'	Report

Wankdorf Stadium, Bern
Attendance: 27,000
Referee: (Switzerland) Ernest Guignet Yverdon-les-Bains

== Swiss League Cup ==
The League Cup was played in a knockout system with all 28 league clubs plus four selected teams from the 1. Liga. In the case of a draw, extra time was played. If the teams were still level after extra time, the decision was brought about with a penalty shoot-out. The final was played in Lausanne.

=== Early rounds ===
The routes of the finalists to the final were:

- First round: Sion-Servette 0:1. Xamax-Biel-Bienne 1:0.
- Second round: Young Boys-Servette 1:2. Xamax-La Chaux-de-Fonds 4:1.
- Quarter-finals: Fribourg-Sevette 1:2. Aarau-Xamax 0:1.
- Semi-finals: Servette-Grasshopper Club 2:1. Xamax-Chênois 4:3 (a.e.t.).

=== Final ===
3 May 1977
Final

Servette	2–0	Xamax
Müller 50'; Thouvenel 75'	Summary

Stade de la Pontaise, Lausanne
Attendance: 7,100
Referee: (Switzerland) Otto Isler Zürich

== Swiss Clubs in Europe ==
- Zürich as 1975–76 Nationalliga A champions: 1976–77 European Cup and entered 1976 Intertoto Cup
- Servette as Swiss Cup runners-up: 1976–77 Cup Winners' Cup
- Basel as league third placed team: 1976–77 UEFA Cup
- Grasshopper Club as league fourth placed team: 1976–77 UEFA Cup and entered 1976 Intertoto Cup
- Young Boys: entered 1976 Intertoto Cup
- St. Gallen: entered 1976 Intertoto Cup

=== Zürich ===
==== European Cup ====
===== First round =====
15 September 1976 First leg	Rangers (Scotland)	1–1	(Switzerland) Zürich	Ibrox Stadium, Glasgow
	Parlane 34'	Report	Cucinotta 1'	Attendance: 28,500; Referee: Achille Verbecke (France)

29 September 1976 Second leg	Zürich (Switzerland)	1–0 (2–1 agg.)	(Scotland) Rangers	Letzigrund, Zürich
	Martinelli 8'	Report		Attendance: 28,500; Referee: Emilio Guruceta Muro (Spain)

Zürich won 2–1 on aggregate.

===== Second round =====
20 October 1976 First leg	Zürich (Switzerland)	2–0	(Finland) TPS	Letzigrund, Zürich
	Cucinotta 17'; Scheiwiler 71'	Report		Attendance: 15,500; Referee: Josef Pouček (Czechoslovakia)

3 November 1976 Second leg	TPS (Finland)	0–1 (0–3 agg.)	(Switzerland) Zürich	Kupittaa, Turku
		Report	Cucinotta 70'	Attendance: 823; Referee: Marian Kustoń (Poland)

Zürich won 3–0 on aggregate.

===== Quarter-finals =====
2 March 1977 First leg	Zürich (Switzerland)	2–1	(East Germany) Dynamo Dresden	Letzigrund, Zürich
	Cucinotta 41'; Risi 90'	Report	Kreische 77'	Attendance: 19,000; Referee: Nicolae Rainea (Romania)

16 March 1977 Second leg	Dynamo Dresden (East Germany)	3–2 (4–4 agg.)	(Switzerland) Zürich	Rudolf-Harbig-Stadion, Dresden
	Schade 18' (pen.); Kreische 54', 63'	Report	Cucinotta 37'; Risi 64'	Attendance: 33,000; Referee: Ángel Franco Martínez (Spain)

4–4 on aggregate; Zürich won on away goals.

===== Semi-finals =====
6 April 1977 First leg	Zürich (Switzerland)	1–3	(England) Liverpool	Letzigrund, Zürich
	Risi 6' (pen.)	Report	Neal 14', 67' (pen.); Heighway 48'	Attendance: 30,000; Referee: Dogan Babacan (Turkey)

20 April 1977 Second leg	Liverpool (England)	3–0 (6–1 agg.)	(Switzerland) Zürich	Anfield, Liverpool
	Case 33', 79'; Keegan 83'	Report		Attendance: 50,611; Referee: Sergio Gonella (Italy)

Liverpool won 6–1 on aggregate.

==== Intertoto Cup ====
===== Group 5 =====
Pos	Team	Pld	W	D	L	GF	GA	GD	Pts	BRN	DUI	ZÜR	AWI
1	(Czechoslovakia) Zbrojovka Brno	6	5	0	1	13	9	+4	10	—	1–0	1–0	7–3
2	(West Germany) Duisburg	6	3	2	1	13	4	+9	8	5–1	—	3–1	4–0
3	(Switzerland) Zürich	6	2	1	3	9	8	+1	5	0–1	0–0	—	4–1
4	Austria Wien	6	0	1	5	8	22	−14	1	1–2	1–1	2–4	—

Source: mogiel.net
Rules for classification: 1) Points; 2) Goal difference; 3) Goals scored; 4) Head-to-head points; 5) Away goals scored; 6) Draw.

26 June 1976 Matchday 1	Zbrojovka Brno (Czechoslovakia)	1–0	(Switzerland) Zürich	Brno
	Hamár 85' (1:0)	FCZ summary		Attendance: 2,500; Referee: (Czechoslovakia) Rozhodoj

3 July 1976 Matchday 2	Zürich (Switzerland)	4–1	Austria Wien	Sportplatz, Sarmenstorf
	Scheiwiler 14' (1:0); P. Stierli 27' (2:0); Cucinotta 43' (3:0); Risi 82' (4:1)	FCZ summary	62' (3:1) Pospischil; (yellow card) Pirkner; (yellow card) Prohaska	Attendance: 2,500; Referee: (Switzerland) Ernst Dörflinger (Grenchen)
Note: Inauguration of the Sarmenstorf sports fields

11 July 1976 Matchday 3	Zürich (Switzerland)	0–0	(West Germany) Duisburg	Letzigrund, Zürich
	Katić (yellow card) 25'; Chapuisat (yellow card) 71'	FCZ summary	(yellow card) 81' Seliger	Attendance: 4,000; Referee: (Switzerland) Bruno della Bruna (Lumino)

17 July 1976 Matchday 4	Austria Wien	2–4	(Switzerland) Zürich	Wiener Sportclub grounds, Vienna
	Weiss 50' (1:3); Pöll 73' (2:4)	FCZ summary	14' (0:1) Risi; 20' (0:2) Risi; 41' (0:3) Cucinotta; 72' (1:4) Cucinotta	Attendance: 1,000; Referee: (Austria) Andreas Siegl

24 July 1976 Matchday 5	Duisburg (West Germany)	3–1	(Switzerland) Zürich	Dinslaken
	Dietz 71' (pen 1:1); Worm 82' (2:1); Suchanek 86' (3:1)	FCZ summary	65' (0:1) Risi	Attendance: 6,000

27 July 1976 Matchday 6	Zürich (Switzerland)	0–1	(Czechoslovakia) Zbrojovka Brno	Sportplatz, Weesen, Switzerland
		FCZ summary	73' (0:1) Pešice	Attendance: 2,400; Referee: (Switzerland) Walter Hungerbühler (St. Gallen)
Note: Inauguration and opening game of the main pitch

=== Servette ===
==== Cup Winners' Cup ====
===== Preliminary round =====
4 August 1976 Prelim Round (1st Leg)	Cardiff City (Wales)	1–0	(Switzerland) Servette	Cardiff
19:30	Evans 90'			Stadium: Ninian Park; Attendance: 10,266; Referee: Alexis Ponnet (Belgium)

11 August 1976 Prelim Round (2nd Leg)	Servette (Switzerland)	2–1 (2–2a agg.)	(Wales) Cardiff City	Geneva
20:30	Bizzini 63'; Pfister 86'		34' Showers	Stadium: Stade des Charmilles; Attendance: 21,500; Referee: Heinz Aldinger (West Germany)

2–2 on aggregate; Cardiff won on away goals.

=== Basel ===
==== UEFA Cup ====
===== First round =====
14 September 1976 First leg	Glentoran F.C. (Northern Ireland)	3–2	(Switzerland) Basel	The Oval, Belfast
17:00	Feeney 12' (1:0); Feeney 42' (2:1); Dickenson 51' (3:1)	UEFA Report; FCB Summary	26' (1:1) Maissen; (yellow card) 52' Lauscher; 73' (3:2) Ramseier	Attendance: 3,000; Referee: (Sweden) Rolf Ericsson

29 September 1976 Second leg	Basel (Switzerland)	3–0 (5–2 agg.)	(Northern Ireland) Glentoran F.C.	St. Jakob Stadium, Basel
20:00	Eigil Nielsen 33' (1:0); Mundschin 35' (2:0); Demarmels 73' (3:0)	UEFA Summary; FCB Summary	(yellow card) 52' McCreery	Referee: (Italy) Cesare Gussoni

Basel won 5–3 on aggregate.

===== Second round =====
20 October 1976 First leg	Basel (Switzerland)	1–1	(Spain) Athletic Bilbao	Basel
20:00	Marti 2'	UEFA Summary; FCB Summary	45' Madariaga	Stadium: St. Jakob Stadium; Attendance: 15,000; Referee: Rudi Glöckner (East Germany)

3 November 1976 Second leg	Athletic Bilbao (Spain)	3–1 (4–2 agg.)	(Switzerland) Basel	Bilbao
20:00	Villar 45' (1:0); Carlos 61' (2:0); Carlos 68' (3:1)	UEFA Summary; FCB Summary	66' (2:1) Marti	Stadium: San Mamés; Attendance: 35,000; Referee: (England) Patrick Partridge

Athletic Bilbao won 4–2 on aggregate.

=== Grasshopper Club ===
==== UEFA Cup ====
===== First round =====
15 September 1976 First leg	Grasshoppers (Switzerland)	7–0	(Malta) Hibernians	Hardturm, Zürich
	Bosco 3'; Seiler 8', 18', 31'; Bauer 46'; Cornioley 57' (pen.), 86'	Report		Attendance: 1,800; Referee: René Vigliani (France)

29 September 1976 Second leg	Hibernians (Malta)	0–2 (0–9 agg.)	(Switzerland) Grasshoppers	Hibernians Stadium, Paola
		Report	Seiler 54'; Cornioley 77' (pen.)	Attendance: 828; Referee: Miloš Čajić (Yugoslavia)

Grasshoppers won 9–0 on aggregate.

===== Second round =====
20 October 1976 First leg	Köln (West Germany)	2–0	(Switzerland) Grasshoppers	Müngersdorfer Stadion, Cologne
	Konopka 37'; Müller 77'	Report		Attendance: 18,000; Referee: Malcolm Wright (Northern Ireland)

3 November 1976 Second leg	Grasshoppers (Switzerland)	2–3 (2–5 agg.)	(West Germany) Köln	Hardturm, Zürich
	Bauer 75' (pen.); Bosco 85'	Report	Müller 56'; Elkjær 58', 79'	Attendance: 12,500; Referee: Marijan Rauš (Yugoslavia)

Köln won 5–2 on aggregate.

==== Intertoto Cup ====
===== Group 3 =====
Pos	Team	Pld	W	D	L	GF	GA	GD	Pts	TEP	KIC	GCZ	LAN
1	(Czechoslovakia) Union Teplice	6	3	2	1	10	4	+6	8	—	2–0	4–1	0–0
2	(West Germany) Kickers Offenbach	6	4	0	2	6	6	0	8	0–3	—	1–0	1–0
3	(Switzerland) Grasshopper Club	6	2	1	3	4	7	−3	5	2–0	0–2	—	1–0
4	(Sweden) Landskrona	6	0	3	3	2	5	−3	3	1–1	1–2	0–0	—

Source: mogiel.net
Rules for classification: 1) Points; 2) Goal difference; 3) Goals scored; 4) Head-to-head points; 5) Away goals scored; 6) Draw.

=== Young Boys ===
==== Intertoto Cup ====
===== Group 1 =====
Pos	Team	Pld	W	D	L	GF	GA	GD	Pts	YB	MAL	BEI	ADM
1	(Switzerland) Young Boys	6	3	3	0	15	9	+6	9	—	3–2	6–3	1–1
2	(Sweden) Malmö FF	6	2	3	1	13	6	+7	7	1–1	—	3–1	6–0
3	(Israel) Beitar Jerusalem	6	2	2	2	12	13	−1	6	1–1	1–1	—	3–1
4	(Austria) Admira/Wacker Wien	6	0	2	4	4	16	−12	2	1–3	0–0	1–3	—

Source: mogiel.net
Rules for classification: 1) Points; 2) Goal difference; 3) Goals scored; 4) Head-to-head points; 5) Away goals scored; 6) Draw.

=== St. Gallen ===
==== Intertoto Cup ====
===== Group 9 =====
Pos	Team	Pld	W	D	L	GF	GA	GD	Pts	DJU	STU	STG	RYB
1	(Sweden) Djurgården	6	3	1	2	11	8	+3	7	—	3–0	3–2	3–0
2	(Austria) Sturm Graz	6	3	1	2	8	8	0	7	1–0	—	1–1	2–1
3	(Switzerland) St. Gallen	6	2	2	2	9	8	+1	6	0–0	2–1	—	4–1
4	(Poland) Rybnik	6	2	0	4	10	14	−4	4	5–2	1–3	2–0	—

Source: mogiel.net
Rules for classification: 1) Points; 2) Goal difference; 3) Goals scored; 4) Head-to-head points; 5) Away goals scored; 6) Draw.

== Sources ==
- Switzerland 1976–77 at RSSSF
- League Cup finals at RSSSF
- European Competitions 1976–77 at RSSSF.com
- Cup finals at Fussball-Schweiz
- Intertoto history at Pawel Mogielnicki's Page
- Josef Zindel (2018). FC Basel 1893. Die ersten 125 Jahre (in German). Basel: Friedrich Reinhardt Verlag. ISBN 978-3-7245-2305-5.

Preceded by 1975–76	Seasons in Swiss football	Succeeded by 1977–78
