= René Botteron =

Swiss footballer (born 1954)

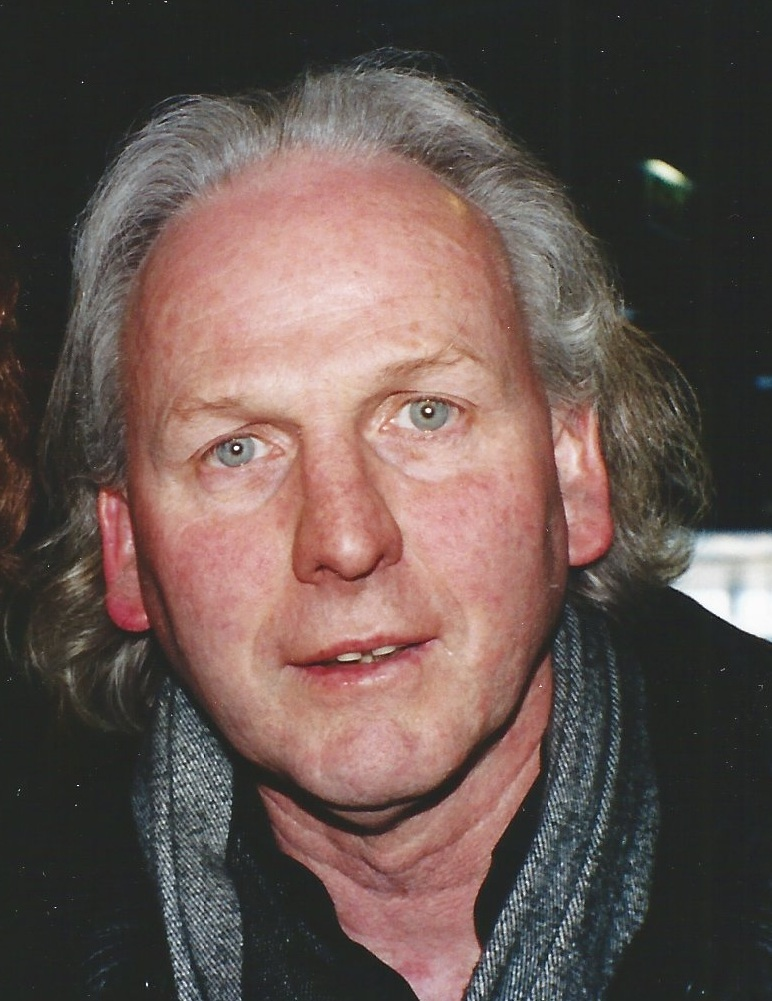

Personal information
- Date of birth: 17 October 1954 (age 72)
- Place of birth: Glarus, Switzerland
- Position: Midfielder

Youth career
- FC Glarus

Senior career*
| Years | Team | Apps | (Gls) |
| 1972–1980 | FC Zürich | 208 | (43) |
| 1980–1982 | 1. FC Köln | 39 | (3) |
| 1982 | Standard Liège | 14 | (1) |
| 1982–1983 | 1. FC Nürnberg | 32 | (1) |
| 1983–1987 | FC Basel | 56 | (3) |

International career
| 1974–1982 | Switzerland | 65 | (2) |
- * Club domestic league appearances and goals

René "Bobo" Botteron (born 17 October 1954) is a Swiss former football midfielder who played for various clubs in Switzerland, Germany and Belgium throughout the 1970s and 1980s.

== Career ==
Botteron started his professional career at FC Zürich in 1972 and won three League Titles and three Swiss Cups before he left in 1980 to join the 1. FC Köln side of the early 1980s, where he played alongside the likes of Dieter Müller, Bernd Schuster, Tony Woodcock, Rainer Bonhof, Bernhard Cullmann, Klaus Fischer, Klaus Allofs and Stephan Engels. He had a short spell at Standard Liège in 1982, where he helped the side reach the final of the UEFA Cup Winners' Cup only to be defeated by FC Barcelona, before signing for 1. FC Nürnberg. In 1983, he returned to Switzerland with FC Basel and retired in 1987 following the club's relegation to the Nationalliga B.

He also played for the Swiss national team and picked up 65 caps between 1974 and 1982, but never played at any major tournaments.

== Honours ==
FC Zürich

- Swiss League: 1973–74, 1974–75, 1975–76
- Swiss Cup: 1971–72, 1972–73, 1975–76

=== 1.FC Köln ===
- Bundesliga Runners-Up: 1981–82
- DFB-Pokal Runners-Up: 1979–80
- Joan Gamper Trophy: 1981

Standard Liège

- Belgian First Division: 1981–82
- European Cup Winners' Cup: 1981-82 (runners-up)

FC Basel

- Uhrencup: 1983, 1986
