= Vladimir Belousov (footballer) =

Russian football player and coach

Personal information
- Full name: Vladimir Sergeyevich Belousov
- Date of birth: 11 July 1947 (age 79)
- Place of birth: Moscow, Russian SFSR, Soviet Union
- Height: 1.83 m (6 ft 0 in)
- Position: Defender

Senior career*
Years	Team	Apps	(Gls)
- FC Metrostroy Moscow
- FC Temp Zagorsk
1970–1971	SC Tavriya Simferopol	55	(1)
1971–1973	FC Shakhtar Donetsk	67	(0)
1974–1977	FC Torpedo Moscow	68	(0)
1977	FC Kuban Krasnodar	42	(0)
1977–1978	TSG Neustrelitz		

Managerial career
- 1980: FC Kuban Krasnodar (assistant)
- 1981–1982: FC Kuban Krasnodar
- 1986–1987: SK EShVSM Moscow (assistant)
- 1992: FC TRASKO Moscow (assistant)
- 1994: FC Asmaral Moscow (assistant)
- 1994: FC Asmaral Moscow
- 1995–1996: FC Torpedo-Luzhniki (assistant)
- 1997: FC Torpedo-Luzhniki-d
- 1999–2000: FC Torpedo-ZIL Moscow (assistant)
- 2016: FC Torpedo Moscow (assistant)
- 2016: FC Torpedo Moscow (caretaker)
- 2016–2018: FC Torpedo Moscow (scout)
- * Club domestic league appearances and goals

Vladimir Sergeyevich Belousov (Russian: Владимир Сергеевич Белоусов; born 11 July 1947) is a Russian professional football coach and former defender.

== Career ==
In 1976 he became the champion of the USSR with a FC Torpedo Moscow.
