= András Tóth (footballer, born 1949) =

Hungarian footballer

Personal information
- Date of birth: 5 September 1949 (age 77)
- Place of birth: Budapest, Hungary
- Height: 1.81 m (5 ft 11 in)
- Position: Forward

Senior career*
Years	Team	Apps	(Gls)
1968–1981	Újpesti Dózsa		
1981–1983	Lierse		
1983–1985	MTK-VM		

International career
	Hungary	17	(1)
- * Club domestic league appearances and goals

András Tóth (born 5 September 1949) is a Hungarian former footballer who played at the 1978 FIFA World Cup. A forward, he played for Újpesti Dózsa, MTK-VM and Belgian club Lierse at club level. Internationally, he made 17 appearances scoring one goal for the Hungary national team.
