= Pierre Carteus =

Belgian footballer

- Carteus playing for Club Brugge

Personal information
- Date of birth: 24 September 1943
- Place of birth: Ronse, Belgium
- Date of death: 4 February 2003 (aged 59)
- Place of death: Ronse, Belgium
- Position: Midfielder

Senior career*
Years	Team	Apps	(Gls)
1959–1964	R.F.C. Renaisien		
1964–1966	Roeselare		
1966–1974	Club Brugge		
1974–1977	AS Oostende		
1977–?	R.F.C. Renaisien		

International career
1970	Belgium	2	(0)
- * Club domestic league appearances and goals

Pierre Carteus (Ronse, 24 September 1943 – 4 February 2003) was a Belgian footballer who played as a midfielder. He earned two caps for the Belgium national team and participated in the 1970 FIFA World Cup.

== Death ==
Carteus died aged 59 on 4 February 2003 in his hometown of Ronse after a long illness.

== Honours ==
- Belgian First Division: 1972–73
- Belgian Cup: 1967–68, 1969–70
