= 1975–76 Swiss 1. Liga =

1. Liga
- Season: 1975–76
- Champions: 1. Liga champions: Mendrisiostar; Group West: FC Bulle; Group Cenral: SC Zug; Group South and East: Mendrisiostar
- Promoted: Mendrisiostar; SC Kriens
- Relegated: Group West: FC Montreux-Sports; Group Central: FC Emmenbrücke; Group South and East: US Giubiasco; FC Tössfeld
- Matches: 3 times 156 plus 9 play-offs and 3 play-outs

The 1975–76 1. Liga was the 44th season of this league since its creation in 1931. At this time, the 1. Liga was the third tier of the Swiss football league system and it was the highest level of amateur football.

== Format ==
There were 39 clubs in the 1. Liga. These were divided into three regional groups, each with 13 teams. Within each group, the teams would play a double round-robin to decide their league position. Two points were awarded for a win. The three group winners and the runners-up contested a play-off round to decide the two promotion slots. The last placed teams in each group were directly relegated to the 2. Liga (fourth tier). The three second last placed teams in each group played a single round-robin play-out to decide the fourth relegation slot.

== Group West ==
=== Teams ===
Club	Canton	Stadium	Capacity
ASI Audax-Friul	Neuchâtel	Pierre-à-Bot	1,700
FC Bern	Bern	Stadion Neufeld	14,000
FC Boudry	Neuchâtel	Stade des Buchilles	1,500
FC Bulle	Fribourg	Stade de Bouleyres	7,000
FC Central Fribourg	Fribourg	Guintzet	2,000
FC Dürrenast	Bern	Stadion Lachen	13,500
FC Fétigny	Fribourg	Stade Communal Fétigny	500
FC Le Locle	Neuchâtel	Installation sportive - Jeanneret	3,142
FC Meyrin	Geneva	Stade des Arbères	9,000
FC Monthey	Valais	Stade Philippe Pottier	1,800
FC Montreux-Sports	Vaud	Stade de Chailly	1,000
FC Stade Lausanne	Vaud	Centre sportif de Vidy	1,000
FC Stade Nyonnais	Vaud	Stade de Colovray	7,200

=== Final league table ===
Pos	Team	Pld	W	D	L	GF	GA	GD	Pts	Qualification or relegation
1	FC Bulle	24	16	3	5	45	29	+16	35	Play-off to Nationalliga B
2	FC Bern	24	14	4	6	43	30	+13	32	Play-off to Nationalliga B
3	FC Stade Lausanne	24	11	6	7	49	35	+14	28	
4	FC Dürrenast	24	9	8	7	45	39	+6	26	
5	ASI Audax-Friul	24	9	6	9	42	42	0	24	
6	FC Meyrin	24	6	12	6	33	35	−2	24	
7	FC Boudry	24	10	4	10	31	33	−2	24	
8	Central Fribourg	24	10	4	10	28	31	−3	24	
9	FC Fétigny	24	8	7	9	33	41	−8	23	
10	FC Stade Nyonnais	24	7	7	10	35	31	+4	21	
11	FC Monthey	24	6	9	9	23	28	−5	21	
12	FC Le Locle	24	7	6	11	29	25	+4	20	Play-out against relegation
13	FC Montreux-Sports	24	1	8	15	25	62	−37	10	Relegation to 2. Liga Interregional

Source: RSSSF
Rules for classification: 1) Points; 2) Goal difference within the league, but decider play-off for qualifiers; 3) Goals scored; 4) Head-to-head points; 5) Away goals scored; 6) Draw.

== Group Central ==
=== Teams ===
Club	Canton	Stadium	Capacity
US Boncourt	Jura	Stade Communal Léon Burrus	1,640
FC Brunnen	Schwyz	Wintersried	500
SC Buochs	Nidwalden	Stadion Seefeld	5,000
FC Concordia Basel	Basel-City	Stadion Rankhof	7,000
SR Delémont	Jura	La Blancherie	5,263
FC Emmenbrücke	Lucerne	Stadion Gersag	8,700
SC Kleinhüningen	Basel-City	Sportplatz Schorenmatte	300
SC Kriens	Lucerne	Stadion Kleinfeld	5,100
FC Köniz	Bern	Sportplatz Liebefeld-Hessgut	2,600
FC Laufen	Basel-Country	Sportplatz Nau	3,000
FC Solothurn	Solothurn	Stadion FC Solothurn	6,750
FC Zug	Zug	Herti Allmend Stadion	6,000
SC Zug	Zug	Herti Allmend Stadion	6,000

=== Final league table ===
Pos	Team	Pld	W	D	L	GF	GA	GD	Pts	Qualification or relegation
1	SC Zug	24	13	7	4	41	17	+24	33	Play-off to Nationalliga B
2	SC Kriens	24	10	12	2	42	22	+20	32	Play-off to Nationalliga B
3	FC Laufen	24	11	7	6	35	25	+10	29	
4	FC Köniz	24	11	7	6	29	21	+8	29	
5	SR Delémont	24	12	5	7	36	33	+3	29	
6	FC Solothurn	24	9	6	9	29	27	+2	24	
7	FC Brunnen	24	8	8	8	34	34	0	24	
8	SC Buochs	24	8	6	10	34	39	−5	22	
9	FC Zug	24	8	4	12	33	46	−13	20	
10	US Boncourt	24	7	4	13	31	35	−4	18	
11	SC Kleinhüningen	24	6	6	12	21	41	−20	18	
12	FC Concordia Basel	24	5	7	12	23	28	−5	17	Play-out against relegation
13	FC Emmenbrücke	24	5	7	12	25	35	−10	17	Relegation to 2. Liga Interregional

Source: RSSSF
Rules for classification: 1) Points; 2) Goal difference within the league, but decider play-off for qualifiers; 3) Goals scored; 4) Head-to-head points; 5) Away goals scored; 6) Draw.

== Group South and East ==
=== Teams ===
Club	Canton	Stadium	Capacity
FC Baden	Aargau	Esp Stadium	7,000
FC Blue Stars Zürich	Zürich	Hardhof	1,000
SC Brühl	St. Gallen	Paul-Grüninger-Stadion	4,200
FC Chur	Grisons	Ringstrasse	2,820
FC Frauenfeld	Thurgau	Kleine Allmend	6,370
US Giubiasco	Ticino	Campo Semine	1,000
FC Locarno	Locarno, Ticino	Stadio comunale Lido	5,000
Mendrisiostar	Ticino	Centro Sportivo Comunale	4,000
FC Morbio	Ticino	Campo comunale Balerna	800
FC Red Star Zürich	Zürich	Allmend Brunau	2,000
FC Rüti	Zürich	Schützenwiese	1,200
FC Schaffhausen	Schaffhausen	Stadion Breite	7,300
FC Tössfeld	Zürich	Talgut	1,000

=== Final league table ===
Pos	Team	Pld	W	D	L	GF	GA	GD	Pts	Qualification or relegation
1	Mendrisiostar	24	12	9	3	39	24	+15	33	Play-off to Nationalliga B
2	FC Morbio	24	12	8	4	32	19	+13	32	Did not apply for professional licence
3	FC Locarno	24	11	6	7	28	20	+8	28	Play-off to Nationalliga B
4	FC Frauenfeld	24	12	3	9	43	28	+15	27	
5	FC Schaffhausen	24	10	6	8	32	25	+7	26	
6	FC Blue Stars Zürich	24	9	7	8	44	36	+8	25	
7	FC Baden	24	7	11	6	26	24	+2	25	
8	SC Brühl	24	9	5	10	41	33	+8	23	
9	FC Red Star Zürich	24	11	1	12	34	48	−14	23	
10	FC Chur	24	7	8	9	34	42	−8	22	
11	FC Rüti	24	8	6	10	25	34	−9	22	
12	FC Tössfeld	24	5	6	13	23	37	−14	16	Play-out against relegation
13	US Giubiasco	24	1	8	15	18	49	−31	10	Relegation to 2. Liga Interregional

Source: RSSSF
Rules for classification: 1) Points; 2) Goal difference within the league, but decider play-off for qualifiers; 3) Goals scored; 4) Head-to-head points; 5) Away goals scored; 6) Draw.
- FC Morbio did not apply for professional licence and were replaced in the play-offs by FC Locarno.

== Promotion play-off ==
The three group winners played a two legged tie against one of the runners-up to decide the three finalists. The games were played on 6 June and 13 June.

=== Qualification round ===
Team 1	Score	Team 2
SC Kriens	3–1	FC Bulle
FC Bulle	0–1	SC Kriens

SC Kriens win 4–1 on aggregate and continue to the finals.

Team 1	Score	Team 2
FC Bern	1–1	Mendrisiostar
Mendrisiostar	2–1	FC Bern

Mendrisiostar win 3–2 on aggregate and continue to the finals.

Team 1	Score	Team 2
FC Locarno	1–0	SC Zug
SC Zug	3–0	FC Locarno

SC Zug win 3–1 on aggregate and continue to the finals.

=== Final round ===
The three first round winners competed in a single round-robin to decide the two promotion slots. The games were played on 20 June, 27 June and 4 July.

Pos	Team	Pld	W	D	L	GF	GA	GD	Pts	MEN	KRI	SCZ
1	Mendrisiostar	2	1	1	0	3	2	+1	3	—	1–0	—
2	SC Kriens	2	1	0	1	2	1	+1	2	—	—	2–0
3	SC Zug	2	0	1	1	2	4	−2	1	2–2	—	—

Source: RSSSF

Mendrisiostar are 1. Liga champions, SC Kriens are runners-up and these two teams are promoted.

== Relegation play-out ==
The three second last placed teams from each group competed in a single round-robin play-out to decide the fourth and last relegation slot.

Pos	Team	Pld	W	D	L	GF	GA	GD	Pts	LeL	CON	TÖS
1	FC Le Locle	2	1	1	0	2	1	+1	3	—	2–1	—
2	FC Concordia Basel	2	1	0	1	4	3	+1	2	—	—	3–1
3	FC Tössfeld	2	0	1	1	1	3	−2	1	0–0	—	—

Source: RSSSF

FC Tössfeld are relegated to 2. Liga Interregional.

== Further in Swiss football ==
- 1975–76 Nationalliga A
- 1975–76 Nationalliga B
- 1975–76 Swiss Cup

== Sources ==
- Switzerland 1975–76 at RSSSF

Preceded by 1974–75	Seasons in Swiss 1. Liga	Succeeded by 1976–77
