= 1976–77 FC Zürich season =

FC Zürich
1976–77 season
- Owner: Edwin Nägeli
- Chairman: Edwin Nägeli
- Head coach: Friedhelm Konietzka
- Stadium: Letzigrund
- Nationalliga A: 3rd
- Swiss Cup: Quarter-finals
- 1976–77 Swiss League Cup: Round 1
- 1976–77 European Cup: Semi-finals
- 1976 Intertoto Cup: 3rd in group
- Top goalscorer: League: Franco Cucinotta (28); All: Franco Cucinotta (38)

The 1976–77 season was FC Zürich's 80th season in their existence, since their foundation in 1896. It was their 18th consecutive season in the top flight of Swiss football, following their promotion at the end of the 1957–58 season. They played their home games in the Letzigrund.

== Overview ==
The club's president at this time was Edwin Nägeli, who had held this position since 1957. The FCZ first team head-coach for the sixth consecutive season was the German Friedhelm Konietzka. The first team competed not only in the first-tier Nationalliga, but also competed in 1976–77 Swiss Cup and in the 1976–77 Swiss League Cup. Further, as reigning Swiss domestic league champions, the team had qualified for the 1976–77 European Cup. FCZ also entered into the 1976 Intertoto Cup.

== Players ==
The following is the list of the FCZ first team squad this season. It also includes players that were in the squad the day the season started on 14 August 1976, but subsequently left the club after that date.

Note: Flags indicate national team as defined under FIFA eligibility rules; some limited exceptions apply. Players may hold more than one non-FIFA nationality.

No.	Pos.	Nation	Player
1	GK	SUI	Karl Grob (league games: 32)
—	DF	SUI	Hilmar Zigerlig (league games: 31)
—	DF	SUI	Pierre-Albert Chapuisat (league games: 31)
—	DF	SUI	Max Heer (league games: 26)
—	DF	SUI	Pirmin Stierli (league games: 27)
—	DF	SUI	Pius Fischbach (league games: 30)
—	DF	SUI	Fritz Baur (league games: 7)
—	MF	SUI	Rosario Martinelli (league games: 6)
—	MF	SUI	Albert Hohl (league games: 0)

No.	Pos.	Nation	Player
—	MF	SUI	Ernst Rutschmann (league games: 19)
—	MF	SUI	Fredi Scheiwiler (league games: 26)
—	MF	SUI	Hans-Joachim Weller (league games: 31)
—	MF	SUI	René Botteron (league games: 32)
—	MF	SUI	Jakob Kuhn (league games: 30)
—	MF	SUI	Georg Aliesch (league games: 6)
—	FW	ITA	Franco Cucinotta (league games: 30)
—	FW	SUI	Peter Risi (league games: 24)
—	FW	SUI	Urs Dickenmann (league games: 5)
—	FW	SUI	Ilija Katić (league games: 0)

Players who left the squad

Note: Flags indicate national team as defined under FIFA eligibility rules; some limited exceptions apply. Players may hold more than one non-FIFA nationality.

No.	Pos.	Nation	Player
—	GK	SUI	Hanspeter Janser (retired)
—	GK	SUI	Ruedi Hauser (to FC Küsnacht)
—	DF	SUI	Giuseppe Sanfilippo (to SC Zug)
—	DF	SUI	Silvio Galbucci (to FC Winterthur)

No.	Pos.	Nation	Player
—	MF	SUI	Walter Iselin (to FC Gossau)
—	MF	SUI	Silvio Hartmann (to reserve team)
—	FW	GER	Giulio Anthon (to FC Wettingen)
—	FW	SUI	Rolf von Allmen (to FC Stäfa)
—	FW	SUI	Pius Senn (to Young Fellows)

== Results ==
Legend

Win Draw Loss Postponed

=== Nationalliga ===
==== Qualifying phase matches ====
14 August 1976 Round 1	Zürich	6–1	Neuchâtel Xamax	Letzigrund, Zürich
20:00	Cucinotta 8' (1:0); Botteron 29' (2:0); Martinelli 33' (3:0); Risi 58' (pen. 4:1); Zigerlig (yellow card) 62'; Cucinotta 77' (5:1); Scheiwiler 87' (6:1)	FCZ summary	37' (3:1) Zaugg	Attendance: 6,500; Referee: (Switzerland) René Kellenberger (Herisau)

21 August 1976 Round 2	Grasshopper Club	2–2	Zürich	Hardturm, Zürich
20:00	Seiler 18' (1:0); Seiler 25' (2:0)	FCZ summary	(yellow card) 65' Grob; 66' (pen.) Risi; (yellow card) 70' Kuhn; 72' (2:2) Scheiwiler	Attendance: 20,000; Referee: (Switzerland) Ernst Dörflinger (Grenchen and Basel)

28 August 1976 Round 3	Zürich	2–0	Chiasso	Letzigrund, Zürich
17:00	Martinelli 14' (1:0); Risi 67' (2:0)	FCZ summary	(yellow card) 40' Yaghcha	Attendance: 4,500; Referee: (Switzerland) A. Häring (Düdingen)
Note: Corners: 14:1

1 September 1976 Round 4	Lausanne-Sport	1–1	Zürich	Olympique de la Pontaise, Lausanne
20:30	Künzli 60' (1:0)	FCZ summary	61' (1:1) Cucinotta	Attendance: 14,000; Referee: (Switzerland) Peter Scherz (Aegerten)
Note: Corners: 9:5

11 September 1976 Round 5	Bellinzona	0–3	Zürich	Stadio Comunale Bellinzona, Bellinzona
20:30	Erba (yellow card)	FCZ summary	58' (0:1) Weller; 75' (0:2) Risi; 85' (0:3) Scheiwiler	Attendance: 5,500; Referee: (Switzerland) Jean Dubach (Nidau)
Note: Corners: 4:9

18 September 1976 Round 6	Zürich	1–0	Basel	Letzigrund, Zürich
17:00	Risi 67' (1:0)	FCZ summary FCB summary		Attendance: 15,000; Referee: (Switzerland) Gérard Racine Biel/Bienne

2 October 1976 Round 7	Young Boys	1–1	Zürich	Wankdorf Stadium, Bern
17:30	Rebmann 36' (1:0)	FCZ summary	71' (1:1) Cucinotta	Attendance: 26,000; Referee: (Switzerland) André Favre (Échallens)

13 October 1976 Round 8	Zürich	4–0	Winterthur	Letzigrund, Zürich
20:00	Kuhn 8' (1:0); Botteron 26' (2:0); Cucinotta 73' (3:0); Rutschmann 82' (pen.)	FCZ summary	(penalty missed) 35′ Schweizer; (yellow card) 40' Bollmann	Attendance: 3,800; Referee: (Switzerland) Attilio Bignasca (Lugano)
Note: Corners: 17:3 (9:1)

24 October 1976 Round 9	Zürich	1–1	Servette	Letzigrund, Zürich
14:30	Cucinotta 49' (1:1); Chapuisat (yellow card) 63'; Cucinotta (yellow card) 63'	FCZ summary	(yellow card) 44' Andrey; 45' (0:1) Schnyder	Attendance: 16,000; Referee: (Switzerland) Walter Hungerbühler (St. Gallen)

30 October 1976 Round 10	St. Gallen	1–3	Zürich	Espenmoos, St. Gallen
17:30	Brander (yellow card) 28'; Blättler 90' (1:3)	FCZ summary	51' (0:1) Cucinotta; 73' (0:2) Cucinotta; 83' (0:3) Scheiwiler	Attendance: 8,000; Referee: (Switzerland) A. Häring (Düdingen)
Note: Corners: 3:8

7 November 1976 Round 11	Zürich	3–0	Sion	Letzigrund, Zürich
14:30	Cucinotta 10' (1:0); Cucinotta 41' (2:0); Cucinotta (penalty missed) 68′ Botteron 88' (3:0)	FCZ summary	(yellow card) 48' Đorđić; (yellow card) 55' (yellow-red card) 70' Balet	Attendance: 4,000; Referee: (Switzerland) Ernst Dörflinger (Grenchen and Basel)
Note: Deep, heavy surface, continuous rain

13 November 1976 Round 12	Xamax	2–1	Zürich	Stade de la Maladière (1924), Neuchâtel
18:00	Decastel 21' (1:0); Decastel 70' (2:1); Bonny (yellow card)	FCZ summary	33' (1:1) Cucinotta	Attendance: 6,800; Referee: (Switzerland) René Kellenberger (Herisau)
Note: Rain, slippery. First defeat after 35 games unbeaten (since August 1975)

21 November 1976 Round 13	Zürich	1–1	Grasshopper Club	Letzigrund, Zürich
14:30	Becker 18' (1:0); Dickenmann (yellow card) 30'	FCZ summary	48' (1:1) Kuhn	Attendance: 16,000; Referee: (Switzerland) André Daina (Éclépens)
Note: Wet conditions, but no rain.

27 November 1976 Round 14	Chênois	1–0	Zürich	Stade des Trois-Chêne, Thônex
17:00	Porto 43' (1:0)	FCZ summary		Attendance: 4,500; Referee: (Switzerland) Walter Hungerbühler (St. Gallen)
Note: Pitch partly uneven (not rolled). Corners 6:4

5 December 1976 Round 15	Zürich	1–1	Lausanne-Sport	Letzigrund, Zürich
14:30	Goal	FCZ summary	Goal	Attendance: 4,500; Referee: (Switzerland) Jean Dubach, (Nidau)
Note: Terrain covered in snow.

26 February 1977 Round 16	Basel	1–3	Zürich	St. Jakob Stadium, Basel
17:30	Demarmels 69' (1:2)	FCZ summary FCB summary	5' (0:1) Cucinotta; 39' (0:2) Risi; 74' (1:3) Cucinotta	Attendance: 17,000; Referee: (Switzerland) Ernest Guignet (Yverdon)
Note: Corners: 12:2

6 March 1977 Round 17	Zürich	5–1	Young Boys	Letzigrund, Zürich
14:30	Botteron 2' (1:0); Cucinotta 30' (2:0); Risi 33' (3:0); Cucinotta 56' (4:0); Cucinotta 65' (5:0)	FCZ summary	77' (1:0) Odermatt	Attendance: 11,500; Referee: (Switzerland) Bruno della Bruna (Lumino)

12 March 1977 Round 18	Winterthur	0–1	Zürich	Schützenwiese, Winterthur
16:30	Bollmann (yellow card) 73'; Häni (yellow card) 76'	FCZ summary	57' (0:1) Weller; (yellow card) 73' Rutschmann; (yellow card) 86' Zigerlig	Attendance: 3,700; Referee: (Switzerland) Bruno Galler (Kirchdorf, Bern)
Note: Wet, slippery ground

26 March 1977 Round 19	Servette	2–1	Zürich	Charmilles Stadium, Geneva
16:00	Pfister 56' (1:1); Andrey 70' (2:1)	FCZ summary	12' (0:1) Botteron	Attendance: 20,000; Referee: (Switzerland) Jean Dubach (Nidau)

17 April 1977 Round 20	Zürich	2–1	St. Gallen	Letzigrund, Zürich
17:00	Risi 20' (1:0); Weller 53' (2:0)	FCZ summary	(yellow card) 58' Mogg; 81' (2:1) Mogg	Attendance: 4,000; Referee: (Switzerland) André Daina (Éclépens)

9 April 1977 Round 21	Sion	1–1	Zürich	Stade Tourbillon, Sion
18:00	Đorđić 35' (1:1)	FCZ summary	11' (0:1) Cucinotta; (yellow card) 63' Heer	Attendance: 4,500; Referee: (Switzerland) Kurt Fuchs, (Basel)
Note: Cold, unpleasant weather, good ground conditions. Corners: 8:7

16 April 1977 Round 22	Zürich	6–0	Bellinzona	Letzigrund, Zürich
17:00	Cucinotta 23' (1:0); Cucinotta 45' (2:0); Cucinotta 70' (3:0); Weller 73' (4:0); Cucinotta 77' (5:0); Aliesch 88' (6:0)	[ FCZ summary]	(yellow card) 63' Manzoni; (yellow card) 84' (yellow-red card) 87' Erba	Attendance: 3,700; Referee: (Switzerland) Ernst Dörflinger (Grenchen and Basel)

==== Qualifying phase table ====
Pos	Team	Pld	W	D	L	GF	GA	GD	Pts	Qualification
1	Servette	22	14	7	1	68	27	+41	35	To championship round halved points (rounded up) as bonus
2	Basel	22	14	5	3	54	30	+24	33	To championship round halved points (rounded up) as bonus
3	Zürich	22	12	7	3	49	18	+31	31	To championship round halved points (rounded up) as bonus
4	Neuchâtel Xamax	22	10	7	5	37	27	+10	27	To championship round halved points (rounded up) as bonus
5	Young Boys	22	8	9	5	37	34	+3	25	To championship round halved points (rounded up) as bonus
6	Grasshopper Club	22	7	8	7	41	28	+13	22	To championship round halved points (rounded up) as bonus
7	Lausanne-Sport	22	8	6	8	39	31	+8	22	To relegation play-out round halved points (rounded up) as bonus
8	Chênois	22	6	8	8	29	39	−10	20	To relegation play-out round halved points (rounded up) as bonus
9	Sion	22	4	10	8	19	32	−13	18	To relegation play-out round halved points (rounded up) as bonus
10	St. Gallen	22	5	6	11	26	40	−14	16	To relegation play-out round halved points (rounded up) as bonus
11	Bellinzona	22	3	2	17	19	73	−54	8	To relegation play-out round halved points (rounded up) as bonus
12	Winterthur	22	1	5	16	19	58	−39	7	To relegation play-out round halved points (rounded up) as bonus

Source: rsssf.com
Rules for classification: 1) Points; 2) Goal difference; 3) Goals scored;

==== Championship group matches ====
30 April 1977 Round 1	Zürich	1–0	Grasshopper Club	Letzigrund, Zürich
17:00	Risi 34' (1:0)	FCZ summary	(yellow card) 49' T. Niggl	Attendance: 10,500; Referee: (Switzerland) Ernest Guignet (Yverdon-les-Bains)

7 May 1977 Round 2	Servette	1–0	Zürich	Charmilles Stadium, Geneva
20:30	Chivers 27' (1:0)	FCZ summary	(yellow card) 56' Heer	Attendance: 16,000; Referee: (Switzerland) Jean Dubach (Nidau)

14 May 1977 Round 3	Zürich	3–6	Young Boys	Letzigrund, Zürich
20:00	Cucinotta 55' (1:3); Risi 56' (2:3); Weller 58' (3:3)	FCZ summary	13' (0:1) Küttel; 17' (0:2) Küttel; 30' (0:3) Küttel; (yellow card) 55' Corminboeuf; 67' (3:4) Lorenz; 75' (3:5) Küttel; 85' (3:6) Vögeli; (yellow card) 87' Burkhardt	Attendance: 6,000; Referee: (Switzerland) Othmar Winter, (Martigny)
Note: Corners: 11:5

21 May 1977 Round 4	Zürich	3–3	Basel	Letzigrund, Zürich
20:00	Cucinotta 40' (1:0); Risi 42' (2:0); Cucinotta 72' (3:3)	FCZ summary FCB summary	54' (2:1) Schönenberger; 55' (2:2) Stohler; 61' (2:3) Demarmels; (yellow card) Lauscher; (yellow card) Maissen	Attendance: 11,500; Referee: (Switzerland) Rudolf Renggli Luzern
Note: Corners 6:13

28 May 1977 Round 5	Xamax	2–0	Zürich	Stade de la Maladière (1924), Neuchâtel
20:30	Elsig 23' (1:0); Bonny 51' (2:0)	FCZ summary	(yellow card) 38' Stierli	Attendance: 8,200; Referee: (Switzerland) René Kellenberger (Herisau)

1 JUne 1977 Round 6	Grasshopper Club	0–2	Zürich	Hardturm, Zürich
20:00		FCZ summary	7' (0:1) Risi; (yellow card) 66' Chapuisat; 86' (0:2) Rutschmann	Attendance: 11,400; Referee: (Switzerland) Gérard Racine (La Neuveville)
Note: Corners: 8:8

11 June 1977 Round 7	Zürich	4–0	Servette	Letzigrund, Zürich
20:00	Cucinotta 9' (1:0); Weller 18' (2:0) (Bizzini) 63' (o.g.); Risi 83' (4:0)	FCZ summary		Attendance: 10,000; Referee: (Switzerland) Peter Scherz (Aegerten)

18 June 1977 Round 8	Young Boys	1–5	Zürich	Wankdorf Stadium, Bern
17:30	Odermatt 78' (1:4)	FCZ summary	35' (0:1) Kuhn; 53' (0:2) Weller; 62' (0:3) Risi; 65' (0:4) Botteron; 89' (1:5) Risi	Attendance: 7,200; Referee: (Switzerland) Bruno Galler (Kirchdorf, Bern)

22 June 1977 Round 9	Basel	3–1	Zürich	St. Jakob Stadium, Basel
20:00	Nielsen (yellow card) 33'; Nielsen 53' (1:0); Tanner 57' (2:0); Maissen 71' (3:0)	FCZ summary FCB summary	89' (3:1) Kuhn	Attendance: 14,000; Referee: (Switzerland) André Daina (Éclépens)

25 June 1977 Round 10	Zürich	5–2	Xamax	Letzigrund, Zürich
20:00	Cucinotta 1' (1:0); Cucinotta 33' (2:1); Cucinotta 43' (3:1) (Mantoan) 65' (o.g.); Weller 87' (5:2)	FCZ summary	12' (1:1) Decastel; 56' (3:2) Geiser	Attendance: 5,000; Referee: (Switzerland) Othmar Winter, (Martigny)
Note: Last game for Jakob Kuhn as active player.

==== Championship table ====
Pos	Team	Pld	W	D	L	GF	GA	GD	BP	Pts	Qualification
1	Basel]	10	5	2	3	19	16	+3	17	29	Championship winners, qualified for 1977–78 European Cup
2	Servette	10	5	1	4	16	14	+2	18	29	Play-off losers, qualified for 1977–78 UEFA Cup
3	Zürich	10	5	1	4	24	18	+6	16	27	qualified for 1977–78 UEFA Cup and entered 1977 Intertoto Cup
4	Grasshopper Club	10	5	2	3	15	10	+5	11	23	qualified for 1977–78 UEFA Cup and entered 1977 Intertoto Cup
5	Xamax	10	3	1	6	14	18	−4	14	21	
6	Young Boys	10	3	1	6	12	24	−12	13	20	Swiss Cup winners, qualified for 1977–78 Cup Winners' Cup and entered 1977 Intertoto Cup

Source: rsssf.com
Rules for classification: 1) Points; 2) Goal difference within the league, but play-off for the title.

=== Swiss Cup ===
26 September 1976 Round 4	Lugano	2–4	Zürich	Cornaredo Stadium, Lugano
14:30	Signorelli 13' (1:2); Arigoni (yellow card) 25'; Brenna (yellow card) 60'; Valsangiacomo 84' (2:3)	FCZ summary	7' (0:1) Stierli; 9' (0:2) Cucinotta; 76' (1:3) Scheiwiler; 90' (2:4) Weller	Attendance: 3,000; Referee: (Switzerland) Gottlieb Barmettler (Luzern)
Note: Corners: 9:7

13 October 1976 Round 5	Vevey Sports	0–2	Zürich	Stade de Copet, Vevey
		FCZ summary	(yellow card) 50' Heer; 81' (0:1) Rutschmann; 82' (0:2) Weller	Attendance: 5,800; Referee: (Switzerland) Jean Dubach (Nidau)}

19 December 1976 Quarter-final	Young Boys	2–1	Zürich	Wankdorf Stadium, Bern
	Andersen (yellow card) 32'; Lorenz 42' (1:1); Vögeli (yellow card) 80'; Andersen 90' (2:1)	YB summary FCZ summary	40' (0:1) Cucinotta	Attendance: 9,500; Referee: (Switzerland) Walter Hungerbühler (St. Gallen)
Note: This match was postponed on 12 December due to unplayable terrain (snow). The playing field had been cleared of snow, but was treacherously half-frozen and therefore bumpy.

=== Swiss League Cup ===
7 August 1977 Round 1	Grasshopper Club	4–4 (a.e.t.) (4–3 p)	Zürich	Hardturm, Zürich
	Bauer 28' (1:1); Bauer 43' (2:1); Seiler 45' (3:2); Bigi Meyer 83' (4:3)	FCZ summary	13' (0:1) Kuhn; 45' (pen. 2:2) Risi; 58' (3:3) P. Stierli; 88' (4:4) Kuhn	Attendance: 12,000; Referee: (Switzerland) Walter Hungerbühler (St. Gallen)
	Penalties
	Gross (penalty missed); Bigi Meyer (penalty scored); Ponte (penalty scored); Bauer (penalty scored); Cornioley (penalty scored)		(penalty scored) Risi; (penalty scored) Kuhn; (penalty missed) Botteron; (penalty scored) Zigerlig; (penalty missed) Grob
Note: Corners: 7:19.

=== European Cup ===
==== First round ====
15 September 1976 First leg	Rangers (Scotland)	1–1	(Switzerland) Zürich	Ibrox Stadium, Glasgow
	Parlane 34'	Report	Cucinotta 1'	Attendance: 28,500; Referee: Achille Verbecke (France)

29 September 1976 Second leg	Zürich (Switzerland)	1–0 (2–1 agg.)	(Scotland) Rangers	Letzigrund, Zürich
	Martinelli 8'	Report		Attendance: 28,500; Referee: Emilio Guruceta Muro (Spain)

Zürich won 2–1 on aggregate.

==== Second round ====
20 October 1976 First leg	Zürich (Switzerland)	2–0	(Finland) TPS	Letzigrund, Zürich
	Cucinotta 17'; Scheiwiler 71'	Report		Attendance: 15,500; Referee: Josef Pouček (Czechoslovakia)

3 November 1976 Second leg	TPS (Finland)	0–1 (0–3 agg.)	(Switzerland) Zürich	Kupittaa, Turku
		Report	Cucinotta 70'	Attendance: 823; Referee: Marian Kustoń (Poland)

Zürich won 3–0 on aggregate.

==== Quarter-final ====
2 March 1977 First leg	Zürich (Switzerland)	2–1	(East Germany) Dynamo Dresden	Letzigrund, Zürich
	Cucinotta 41'; Risi 90'	Report	Kreische 77'	Attendance: 19,000; Referee: Nicolae Rainea (Romania)

16 March 1977 Second leg	Dynamo Dresden (East Germany)	3–2 (4–4 agg.)	(Switzerland) Zürich	Rudolf-Harbig-Stadion, Dresden
	Schade 18' (pen.); Kreische 54', 63'	Report	Cucinotta 37'; Risi 64'	Attendance: 33,000; Referee: Ángel Franco Martínez (Spain)

4–4 on aggregate; Zürich won on away goals.

==== Semi-final ====
6 April 1977 First leg	Zürich (Switzerland)	1–3	(England) Liverpool	Letzigrund, Zürich
	Risi 6' (pen.)	Report	Neal 14', 67' (pen.); Heighway 48'	Attendance: 30,000; Referee: Dogan Babacan (Turkey)

20 April 1977 Second leg	Liverpool (England)	3–0 (6–1 agg.)	(Switzerland) Zürich	Anfield, Liverpool
	Case 33', 79'; Keegan 83'	Report		Attendance: 50,611; Referee: Sergio Gonella (Italy)

Liverpool won 6–1 on aggregate.

=== Intertoto Cup ===
==== Group 5 matches ====
26 June 1976 Matchday 1	Zbrojovka Brno (Czechoslovakia)	1–0	(Switzerland) Zürich	Brno
	Hamár 85' (1:0)	FCZ summary		Attendance: 2,500; Referee: (Czechoslovakia) Rozhodoj

3 July 1976 Matchday 2	Zürich (Switzerland)	4–1	Austria Wien	Sportplatz, Sarmenstorf
	Scheiwiler 14' (1:0); P. Stierli 27' (2:0); Cucinotta 43' (3:0); Risi 82' (4:1)	FCZ summary	62' (3:1) Pospischil; (yellow card) Pirkner; (yellow card) Prohaska	Attendance: 2,500; Referee: (Switzerland) Ernst Dörflinger (Grenchen)
Note: Inauguration of the Sarmenstorf sports fields

11 July 1976 Matchday 3	Zürich (Switzerland)	0–0	(West Germany) Duisburg	Letzigrund, Zürich
	Katić (yellow card) 25'; Chapuisat (yellow card) 71'	FCZ summary	(yellow card) 81' Seliger	Attendance: 4,000; Referee: (Switzerland) Bruno della Bruna (Lumino)

17 July 1976 Matchday 4	Austria Wien	2–4	(Switzerland) Zürich	Wiener Sportclub grounds, Vienna
	Weiss 50' (1:3); Pöll 73' (2:4)	FCZ summary	14' (0:1) Risi; 20' (0:2) Risi; 41' (0:3) Cucinotta; 72' (1:4) Cucinotta	Attendance: 1,000; Referee: (Austria) Andreas Siegl

24 July 1976 Matchday 5	Duisburg (West Germany)	3–1	(Switzerland) Zürich	Dinslaken
	Dietz 71' (pen 1:1); Worm 82' (2:1); Suchanek 86' (3:1)	FCZ summary	65' (0:1) Risi	Attendance: 6,000

27 July 1976 Matchday 6	Zürich (Switzerland)	0–1	(Czechoslovakia) Zbrojovka Brno	Sportplatz, Weesen, Switzerland
		FCZ summary	73' (0:1) Pešice	Attendance: 2,400; Referee: (Switzerland) Walter Hungerbühler (St. Gallen)
Note: Inauguration and opening game of the main pitch

==== Final group table ====
Pos	Team	Pld	W	D	L	GF	GA	GD	Pts	BRN	DUI	ZÜR	AWI
1	(Czechoslovakia) Zbrojovka Brno	6	5	0	1	13	9	+4	10	—	1–0	1–0	7–3
2	(West Germany) Duisburg	6	3	2	1	13	4	+9	8	5–1	—	3–1	4–0
3	(Switzerland) Zürich	6	2	1	3	9	8	+1	5	0–1	0–0	—	4–1
4	Austria Wien	6	0	1	5	8	22	−14	1	1–2	1–1	2–4	—

Source: mogiel.net
Rules for classification: 1) Points; 2) Goal difference; 3) Goals scored; 4) Head-to-head points; 5) Away goals scored; 6) Draw.

=== Friendly games ===
==== Pre-season and mid-season ====
13 July 1978 Exhibition game	Kriens	0–1	Zürich	Stadion Kleinfeld, Kriens
		FCZ summary	24' (0:1) Rutschmann	Attendance: 700; Referee: (Switzerland) Peter Aschwanden Luzern)

27 July 1976 Exhibition game	FC Polizei ZH	3–8	Zürich	Sportanlage Neudorf, Zürich
	Goal	FCZ summary	Anthon; Anthon; Anthon; Anthon; Risi; Risi; Anthon; Stierli	Attendance: 600; Referee: (Switzerland) Isler (Affoltern am Albis, Zürich)

4 August 1976 Exhibition game	Grenchen	1–2	Zürich	Stadion Brühl, Grenchen
	Wirth 81' (1:2)	FCZ summary	(yellow card) 19' Kuhn; 25' (0:1) Martinelli; 45' (0:2) Hohl	Attendance: 3,000; Referee: (Switzerland) Gérard Racine (La Neuveville)
Note: Corners: 2:12

11 August 1976 Exhibition game	Young Boys	1–1 (a.e.t.) (2–4 p)	Zürich	Stadion Brühl, Grenchen
	Burkhardt 29' (1:0)	FCZ summary	(yellow card) 19' Heer; 85' (1:1) Aliesch	Attendance: 10,500; Referee: (Switzerland) Jean Dubach (Nidau)
	Penalties
	Penalty scored Penalty missed		Penalty scored
Note: Corners: 12:9

23 August 1976 Exhibition game	Zürich	3–1	Bayern Munich	Letzigrund, Zürich
	Botteron 2' (1:0); Konietzka 54' (2:1); Konietzka 76' (3:1)	FCZ summary	24' (1:1) Dürnberger	Attendance: 22,000; Referee: (Switzerland) Jean Dubach (Nidau)

7 September 1976 Exhibition game	Gossau	4–7	Zürich	Sportanlage Buechenwald, Gossau
	Krucker 42' (1:5); Weber 60' (2:7); Maier 78' (3:7); Krucker 81' (4:7)	FCZ summary	5' (0:1) Heer; 11' (0:2) Martinelli; 20' (0:3) Stierli; 24' (0:4) Cucinotta; 35' (0:5) Weller; 48' (1:6) Scheiwiler; 49' (1:7) Scheiwiler	Attendance: 1,050; Referee: (Switzerland) Troy (St. Gallen)

18 November 1976 Exhibition game	Zürich	5–1	FCZ reserves	Letzigrund, Zürich
	Goal	FCZ summary	Goal

==== Winter break ====
5 February 1977 Exhibition game	Zürich	3–2	Kriens	Letzigrund, Zürich
	Botteron 18' (1:0); Risi 28' (2:0); Weller 40' (3:0)	FCZ summary	77' (3:1) Pedraita; 83' (3:2) Renggli	Attendance: 150; Referee: (Switzerland) Rudolf Renggli (Luzern)

13 February 1977 Exhibition game	Zürich	5–0	Grenchen	Sportplatz auf der Mülligen, Zürich
	Cucinotta 5' (1:0); Cucinotta 21' (2:0); Botteron 23' (3:0); Risi 40' (4:0); Cucinotta 88' (5:0)	FCZ summary		Attendance: 300; Referee: (Switzerland) Winiger (Wetzikon)

16 February 1977 Exhibition game	VfB Stuttgart	0–1	Zürich	Neckarstadion, Stuttgart
		FCZ summary	76' (0:1) Risi	Attendance: 1,500; Referee: (Germany) Heinz Aldinger (Waiblingen)

20 February 1977 Exhibition game	Nordstern Basel	0–1	Zürich	Stadion Rankhof, Basel
		FCZ summary	56' (0:1) Cucinotta	Attendance: 1,200; Referee: (Switzerland) Bruno Galler (Kirchdorf, Bern)

20 March 1977 Exhibition game	Zürich	3–1	New York Cosmos	Letzigrund, Zürich
	Botteron 43' (1:1); Scheiwiler 44' (2:1); Weller 63' (3:1)	FCZ summary	26' (0:1) Chinaglia	Attendance: 4,000

== Sources and references ==
- dbFCZ Homepage
- Switzerland 1976–77 at RSSSF
- Swiss League Cup at RSSSF

Preceded by 1975–76	FC Zürich seasons	Succeeded by 1977–78
