= 1975–76 FC Zürich season =

Associan football season

FC Zürich
1975–76 season
- Owner: Edwin Nägeli
- Chairman: Edwin Nägeli
- Head coach: Friedhelm Konietzka
- Stadium: Letzigrund
- Nationalliga A: Champions
- Swiss Cup: Winners
- 1975–76 Swiss League Cup: Runner-up
- 1975–76 European Cup: Round 1
- 1975 Intertoto Cup: Group 4 third
- Top goalscorer: League: Peter Risi (33); All: Peter Risi (42)

The 1975–76 season was FC Zürich's 79th season in their existence, since their foundation in 1896. It was their 17th consecutive season in the top flight of Swiss football, following their promotion at the end of the 1957–58 season. They played their home games in the Letzigrund.

== Overview ==
The club's president at this time was Edwin Nägeli, who had held this position since 1957. The FCZ first team head-coach for the fifth consecutive season was the German Friedhelm Konietzka. The first team competed not only in the first-tier Nationalliga, but also competed in 1975–76 Swiss Cup and in the 1975–76 Swiss League Cup. Further, the team had qualified for the 1975–76 European Cup by becoming Swiss domestic league champions at the end of the 1974–75 Nationalliga A season. FCZ also entered into the 1975 Intertoto Cup.

== Players ==
The following is the list of the FCZ first team squad this season. It also includes players that were in the squad the day the league season started on 16 August 1975, but subsequently left the club after that date.

Note: Flags indicate national team as defined under FIFA eligibility rules; some limited exceptions apply. Players may hold more than one non-FIFA nationality.

No.	Pos.	Nation	Player
1	GK	SUI	Karl Grob (league games: 26)
—	GK	SUI	Hanspeter Janser (league games: 2)
—	GK	SUI	Ruedi Hauser (league games: 0)
—	DF	SUI	Pius Fischbach (league games: 25)
—	DF	SUI	Hilmar Zigerlig (league games: 25)
—	DF	SUI	Max Heer (league games: 25)
—	DF	SUI	Pirmin Stierli (league games: 25)
—	DF	SUI	Giuseppe Sanfilippo (league games: 13)
—	DF	SUI	Silvio Galbucci (league games: 0)
—	MF	SUI	Rosario Martinelli (league games: 25)
—	MF	SUI	René Botteron (league games: 25)

No.	Pos.	Nation	Player
—	MF	SUI	Ernst Rutschmann (league games: 25)
—	MF	SUI	Fredi Scheiwiler (league games: 26)
—	MF	SUI	Jakob Kuhn (league games: 22)
—	MF	SUI	Albert Hohl (league games: 3)
—	MF	SUI	Walter Iselin (league games: 2)
—	MF	SUI	Georg Aliesch (league games: 0)
—	MF	SUI	Silvio Hartmann (league games: 0)
—	FW	SUI	Peter Risi (league games: 26)
—	FW	SUI	Ilija Katić (league games: 23)
—	FW	GER	Giulio Anthon (league games: 0)
—	FW	SUI	Rolf von Allmen (league games: 0)
—	FW	SUI	Pius Senn (league games: 0)

Players who left the squad

Note: Flags indicate national team as defined under FIFA eligibility rules; some limited exceptions apply. Players may hold more than one non-FIFA nationality.

No.	Pos.	Nation	Player
—	GK	SUI	Erhard Wyss (to reserve team)
—	DF	SUI	Renzo Bionda (to Lugano)
—	MF	SUI	Heinz Ernst (to reserve team)
—	MF	SUI	Alfred Strasser (to Wettingen)

No.	Pos.	Nation	Player
—	FW	SUI	Erwin Schweizer (to Winterthur)
—	FW	SUI	Peter Marti (to Basel)
—	FW	SUI	Daniel Jeandupeux (to Bordeaux)
—	FW	GER	Friedhelm Konietzka (continued as head-coach)

== Results ==
Legend

Win Draw Loss Postponed

=== Nationalliga ===
==== League matches ====
16 August 1975 Round 1	Zürich	4–1	Lugano	Letzigrund, Zürich
20:00	Scheiwiler 15' (1:0); Risi 18' (pen.); Martinelli (yellow card) 48'; Martinelli 65' (3:1); Heer (yellow card) 81'; Risi 88' (4:1)	FCZ summary	25' (pen.) Gröbli; (yellow card) 81' Perucchi	Attendance: 7,300; Referee: (Switzerland) Ernest Guignet (Yverdon-les-Bains)
Note: Corners 13:1

24 August 1975 Round 2	Neuchâtel Xamax	4–1	Zürich	Stade de la Maladière (1924), Neuchâtel
20:15	Guillaume 48' (1:1); Guillaume 58' (2:1); Müller 65' (3:1); Müller 77' (4:1)	FCZ summary	(yellow card) 13' Stierli; 20' (0:1) Risi	Attendance: 6,600; Referee: (Switzerland) René Maire (Chêne-Bougeries)
Note: Slippery surface, continuous rain until just before the start of the game.

30 August 1975 Round 3	Zürich	2–0	Chênois	Letzigrund, Zürich
20:00	Katić 29' (1:0); Risi 30' (2:0); Rutschmann (yellow card) 65'	FCZ summary	(yellow card) 35' Manai; (yellow card) 83' Malbasky	Attendance: 3,200; Referee: (Switzerland) André Favre (Échallens)
Note: Corners 10:4

6 September 1975 Round 4	Zürich	1–1	St. Gallen	Letzigrund, Zürich
20:00	Martinelli 37' (1:0); Katić (red card) 45'	FCZ summary	(yellow card) 45' Brander; (yellow card) 69' Schwizer; 89' (1:1) Schneeberger	Attendance: 10,300; Referee: (Switzerland) Attilio Bignasca (Lugano)
Note: Corners 4:7

13 September 1975 Round 5	Sion	2–3	Zürich	Stade Tourbillon, Sion
20:15	Luisier 74' (1:2); Parini 81' (2:3)<	FCZ summary	15' (0:1) Scheiwiler; 42' (0:2) Risi; 77' (1:3) Risi	Attendance: 5,000; Referee: (Switzerland) Walter Hungerbühler (St. Gallen)

20 September 1975 Round 6	Zürich	3–1	Young Boys	Letzigrund, Zürich
20:00	Scheiwiler 11' (1:0); Risi 25' (2:1); Risi 70' (3:1)	FCZ summary	23' (1:1) Rebmann; (yellow card) 64' Rebmann	Attendance: 11,500; Referee: (Switzerland) Roland Racine (Prilly)
Note: Corners: 1:8

4 October 1975 Round 7	Basel	1–1	Zürich	St. Jakob Stadium, Basel
20:00	Rahmen 89' (1:1)	Summary	11' (0:1) Kuhn; (yellow card) 43' Zigerlig; (yellow card) 50' Heer	Attendance: 28,000; Referee: (Switzerland) René Matthieu (Sierre)

15 October 1975 Round 8	Zürich	0–0	Servette	Letzigrund, Zürich
20:00	Botteron (yellow card) 40'; Risi (yellow card) 72'	FCZ summary	(yellow card) 80' Hussner	Attendance: 17,500; Referee: (Switzerland) Peter Scherz (Aegerten)

19 October 1975 Round 9	La Chaux-de-Fonds	0–2	Zürich	Stade Charrière, La Chaux-de-Fonds
15:00	Citherlet (yellow card) 77'	FCZ summary	(yellow card) 28' Rutschmann; 55' (0:1) Katić; 58' (0:2) Kuhn; (yellow card) 77' Martinelli	Attendance: 2,400; Referee: (Switzerland) A. Häring (Düdingen)
Note: Slippery surface, rain, cold.

26 October 1975 Round 10	Zürich	1–0	Grasshopper Club	Letzigrund, Zürich
15:00	Katić 87' (1:0)	FCZ summary	(yellow card) 44' Santrač; (yellow card) 70' T. Niggl	Attendance: 22,000; Referee: (Switzerland) André Favre (Échallens)

1 November 1975 Round 11	Winterthur	0–2	Zürich	Schützenwiese, Winterthur
17:00	Meili (yellow card) 73'	FCZ summary	(yellow card) 30' Heer; 62' (0:1) Risi; 87' (0:2) Scheiwiler	Attendance: 6,700; Referee: (Switzerland) Roland Racine (Prilly)

9 November 1975 Round 12	Zürich	5–1	Lausanne-Sport	Letzigrund, Zürich
15:00	Botteron 32' (1:0); Risi 46' (2:0); Katić 62' (3:;0); Risi 68' (4:0); Risi 89' (5:1)	FCZ summary	(yellow card) 50' Marcuard; 70' (pen.) Vuilleumier; (yellow card) 80' Traber	Attendance: 9,300; Referee: (Switzerland) Gérard Racine (La Neuveville)

23 November 1975 Round 13	Biel-Bienne	1–3	Zürich	Gurzelen Stadion, Biel/Bienne
14:30	Stomeo 53' (1:1); Schwemmle (yellow card) 64'	FCZ summary	(yellow card) 34' Heer; 46' (0:1) Scheiwiler; 70' (1:2) Stierli; 76' (1:3) Risi	Attendance: 6,000; Referee: (Switzerland) Attilio Bignasca (Lugano)

30 November 1975 Round 14	Lugano	P–P	Zürich	Cornaredo, Lugano
		[ FCZ summary]		Referee: (Switzerland) Ernest Guignet (Yverdon-les-Bains)
Note: The game was originally scheduled for 30 November but had to be postponed due to the unplayable pitch in the Cornaredo caused by snow and rain.

14 December 1975 Round 14	Lugano	1–2	Zürich	Cornaredo, Lugano
14:45	Brenna 45' (1:1)	FCZ summary	24' (0:1) Risi; (yellow card) 40' Heer; 47' (1:2) Risi; (yellow card) 50' Stierli; (yellow card) 86' Fischbach	Attendance: 1,000; Referee: (Switzerland) Ernest Guignet (Yverdon-les-Bains)
Note: Rain, heavy and soggy conditions. Corners 4:2

7 March 1976 Round 15	Zürich	2–2	Neuchâtel Xamax	Letzigrund, Zürich
15:00	Rutschmann 18' (1:0); Heer (yellow card) 40'; Fischbach 54' (2:1)	FCZ summary	39' (1:1) Guillaume; 71' (2:2) Stalder	Attendance: 5,000; Referee: (Switzerland) Bruno della Bruna (Lumino)
Note: Corners: 9:4

13 March 1976 Round 16	Chênois	3–5	Zürich	Stade des Trois-Chêne, Thônex
14:45	Manai 22' (1:1); Manai (yellow card) 64'; Yaghcha 81' (2:4); Mabillard 83' (3:4)	FCZ summary	13' (0:1) Risi; 30' (1:2) Risi; 57' (1:3) Risi; (yellow card) 61' Stierli; (yellow card) 61' Scheiwiler; 76' (1:1) Risi; 87' (3:5) Risi	Attendance: 4,500; Referee: (Switzerland) André Favre (Échallens)
Note: Deep, but well playable pitch.

28 March 1976 Round 17	St. Gallen	0–1	Zürich	Espenmoos, St. Gallen
15:00	Feuz (yellow card) 70'	FCZ summary	79' (0:1) Risi	Attendance: 9.500; Referee: (Switzerland) Gérard Racine (La Neuveville)
Note: Espenmoos Stadium now featuring a brand new standing terrace for the first time.

3 April 1976 Round 18	Zürich	5–2	Sion	Letzigrund, Zürich
17:00	Risi 22' (1:0); Risi 48' (pen.); Martinelli 59' (3:1); Risi 63' (4:1); Risi 87' (pen.)	FCZ summary	32' (1:1) Vergères; 70' (4:2) Vergères	Attendance: 5,500; Referee: (Switzerland) André Daina (Éclépens)

10 April 1976 Round 19	Young Boys	0–2	Zürich	Wankdorf Stadium, Bern
17:30	Bruttin (yellow card)	FCZ summary	45' (0:1) Rutschmann; 76' (0:2) Risi	Attendance: 18,000; Referee: (Switzerland) Bruno Galler (Kirchdorf, Bern)
Note: Corners 4:8

24 April 1976 Round 20	Zürich	1–1	Basel	Letzigrund, Zürich
17:00	Katić 55' (1:0)	FCZ summary FCB summary	73' (1:1) Hasler	Attendance: 10,500; Referee: (Switzerland) Walter Hungerbühler (St. Gallen)
Note: The ground was soaking wet and very slippery. Corners 2:4

4 May 1976 Round 21	Servette	0–0	Zürich	Charmilles Stadium, Geneva
20:30	Müller (yellow card) 29'; Guyot (yellow card) 51'	FCZ summary	(yellow card) 29' Stierli; (penalty missed) 51′ Risi	Attendance: 23,000; Referee: (Switzerland) Attilio Bignasca (Lugano)

8 May 1976 Round 22	Zürich	8–0	La Chaux-de-Fonds	Letzigrund, Zürich
17:00	Scheiwiler 4' (1:0); Katić 16' (2:0); Katić 20' (3:0); Katić 31' (4:0); Katić 60' (5:0); Scheiwiler 67' (6:0); Scheiwiler 69' (7:0); Risi 87' (8:0)	FCZ summary	(yellow card) Guélat; (yellow card) Delavelle	Attendance: 4,000; Referee: (Switzerland) Gérard Racine (La Neuveville)

15 May 1976 Round 23	Grasshopper Club	1–2	Zürich	Hardturm, Zürich
20:00	Seiler 39' (1:2)	FCZ summary	7' (0:1) Risi; 18' (0:2) Kuhn	Attendance: 13,200; Referee: (Switzerland) Peter Scherz (Aegerten)

29 May 1976 Round 24	Zürich	5–1	Winterthur	Letzigrund, Zürich
17:00	Martinelli 50' (1:0); Katić 60' (2:0); Martinelli 66' (3:0); Risi 71' (4:0); Kuhn 88' (5:1)	FCZ summary	(yellow card) 45' Künzli; 78' (4:1) Künzli	Attendance: 5,500; Referee: (Switzerland) René Maire (Chêne-Bougeries, Genève)
Note: With this victory, FCZ are confirmed as champions for 1975/76.

5 June 1976 Round 25	Lausanne-Sport	0–3	Zürich	Olympique de la Pontaise, Lausanne
20:15		FCZ summary	63' (0:1) Martinelli; 66' (0:2) Stierli; 88' (pen.) Risi	Attendance: 3,300; Referee: (Switzerland) René Kellenberger (Herisau)

12 June 1976 Round 26	Zürich	5–2	Biel-Bienne	Letzigrund, Zürich
18:15	Risi 9' (1:0); Risi 11' (2:1); Risi 25' (3:2); Martinelli 34' (4:2); Katić 68' (5:2)	FCZ summary	10' (1:1) Schwemmle; 21' (2:2) Jallonardo; 70' (5:3) Schwemmle	Attendance: 4,800; Referee: (Switzerland) Walter Hungerbühler (St. Gallen)
Note: After the game, the championship trophy was presented by NL Vice President Kimche.

==== Final league table ====
Pos	Team	Pld	W	D	L	GF	GA	GD	Pts	Qualification or relegation
1	Zürich	26	19	6	1	69	26	+43	44	Swiss champions, qualified for 1976–77 European Cup and Swiss Cup winners, entered 1976 Intertoto Cup
2	Servette	26	16	7	3	50	14	+36	39	Swiss Cup runners-up, qualified for 1976–77 Cup Winners' Cup
3	Basel	26	13	8	5	59	38	+21	34	qualified for 1976–77 UEFA Cup
4	Grasshopper Club	26	14	4	8	54	37	+17	32	qualified for 1976–77 UEFA Cup and entered 1976 Intertoto Cup
5	Young Boys	26	11	9	6	41	27	+14	31	entered 1976 Intertoto Cup
6	Xamax	26	11	8	7	37	25	+12	30	
7	St. Gallen	26	8	11	7	41	39	+2	27	entered 1976 Intertoto Cup
8	Lausanne-Sport	26	10	6	10	35	39	−4	26	
9	Sion	26	6	9	11	40	54	−14	21	
10	Chênois	26	5	9	12	30	42	−12	19	
11	Winterthur	26	8	2	16	34	65	−31	18	
12	Lugano	26	5	6	15	19	37	−18	16	Relegated to Nationalliga B
13	La Chaux-de-Fonds	26	5	4	17	27	61	−34	14	Relegated to Nationalliga B
14	Biel-Bienne	26	5	3	18	26	58	−32	13	Relegated to Nationalliga B

Source: rsssf.com
Rules for classification: 1) Points; 2) Goal difference within the league, however with play-off for qualifiers;

=== Swiss Cup ===
28 September 1975 Round 4	SC Zug	0–2	Zürich	Allmend Stadion, Zug
		FCZ summary	2' (0:1) Martinelli; 36' (0:2) Sanfilippo	Attendance: 3,500; Referee: (Switzerland) Mario Osta (Oberuzwil)

5 November 1975 Round 5	Frauenfeld	0–2	Zürich	Kleine Allmend, Frauenfeld
	Wolf (red card) 28'	FCZ summary	19' (0:1) Stierli; (yellow card) 25' Zigerlig; 58' (0:2) Katić	Attendance: 4,300; Referee: (Switzerland) René Kellenberger (Herisau)
Note: Frauenfeld played in the 1. Liga in 1975/76. Rescheduled match: The first match, played on 29 October 1975, had to be abandoned after 25 minutes due to fog.

16 November 1975 Quarter-final, first leg	Zürich	3–1	Young Boys	Letzigrund, Zürich
	Rutschmann 15' (1:1); Risi 76' (pen.); Risi 80' (3:1)	FCZ summary YB summary	10' (0:1) Odermatt	Attendance: 11,500; Referee: (Switzerland) Mario Osta (Oberuzwil)
Note: Difficult pitch to play on, deep, heavy, in some places treacherous like a saturated sponge, where the ball got stuck.

7 December 1975 Quarter-final, return leg	Young Boys	0–2 (1–5 agg.)	Zürich	Wankdorf Stadium, Bern
	Bruttin (yellow card) 27'	YB summary FCZ summary	(yellow card) 40' Zigerlig; (yellow card) 46' Rutschmann; 47' (0:1) Martinelli; 84' (0:2) Risi; (yellow card) 87' Pirmin Stierli	Attendance: 20,000; Referee: (Switzerland) Roland Racine (Prilly)

16 March 1976 Semi-final, first leg	Biel-Bienne	1–0	Zürich	Stadion Gurzelen,
	Jallonardo 75' (1:0)	FCZ summary		Attendance: 4,800; Referee: (Switzerland) Gottlieb Barmettler (Luzern)
Note: Corners 3:9

21 March 1976 Semi-final, return leg	Zürich	7–2 (7–3 agg.)	Biel-Bienne	Letzigrund, Zürich
	Katić 3' (1:0); Botteron 25' (2:0); Martinelli 49' (3:0); Scheiwiler 55' (4:0); Scheiwiler 60' (5:0); Scheiwiler 63' (6:0); Martinelli 80' (7:1)	summary	79' (6:1) Schwemmle; 85' (pen.) Schwemmle	Attendance: 8,500; Referee: (Switzerland) Attilio Bignasca (Lugano)
Note: Corners 5:8

19 April 1976 Final	Zürich	1–0	Servette	Wankdorf Stadium, Bern
15:00	Katić 9' (1:0); Rutschmann (yellow card) 26'; Risi (yellow card) 58'	Fussball-Schweiz summary	(yellow card) 36' Marchi	Attendance: 46,000; Referee: (Switzerland) Jean Dubach (Nidau)
Note: Sunny, warm, but with a cooling wind. Corners 5:5; 42,257 paying spectators.

=== Swiss League Cup ===
9 August 1975 Round 1	Zürich	2–2 (a.e.t.) (4–2 p)	Grasshopper Club	Letzigrund, Zürich
20:00	Katić 50' (1:0); Katić 102' (2:2)	FCZ summary	18' (0:1) Barberis; (yellow card) 81' Becker; 94' (1:2) Elsener; (yellow card) 107' T. Niggl	Attendance: 9,500; Referee: (Switzerland) René Matthieu (Sierre)
	Penalties
	Risi (penalty scored); Sanfilippo (penalty missed); Kuhn (penalty scored); Botteron (penalty scored); Rutschmann (penalty scored)		(penalty scored) Gross; (penalty scored) Elsener; (penalty missed) Bosco; (penalty missed) Cornioley

22 February 1976 Round 2	Laufen	1–7	Zürich	St. Jakob Stadium, Basel
	Kellerhals 88' (pen. 1:7)	FCZ summary	20' (pen. 0:1) Rutschmann; 30' (0:2) Katić; 37' (0:3) Kuhn; 58' (0:4) Kuhn; 62' (o.g.) (Dietler); 67' (0:6) Scheiwiler; (yellow card) 71' Heer; 81' (o.g.) Kellerhals; (yellow card) 85' Martinelli	Attendance: 1,800; Referee: (Switzerland) Jean-Marie Macheret (Rueyres-Saint-Laurent)
Note: 48' Bader (Laufen) is forced to leave the field injured after a foul by Rutschmann, Laufen subsequently only field 10 players after a double substitution at halftime.

29 February 1976 Quarter-final	Lugano	0–1 (a.e.t.)	Zürich	Cornaredo Stadium, Lugano
	Lalic (yellow card) 14'; Brenna (yellow card) 66'; Lanfranconi (yellow card) 48' (yellow-red card) 86'	FCZ summary	108' (pen.) Rutschmann	Attendance: 2,000; Referee: (Switzerland) Ernst Dörflinger (Grenchen)

27 April 1976 Semi-final	Zürich	5–0	Sion	Letzigrund, Zürich
	Risi 22' (1:0); Martinelli 29' (2:0); Katić 55' (3:0); Risi 65' (4:0); Katić 79' (5:0)	FCZ summary	(yellow card) 5' Trinchero	Attendance: 2,000; Referee: (Switzerland) Peter Scherz (Aegerten)

23 May 1976 Final	Young Boys	4–2	Zürich	Wankdorf Stadium, Bern
	Küttel 1' (1:0); Bruttin 67' (2:0); Küttel 71' (3:0); Rebmann 73' (4:0)	YB summery FCZ summary	80' (4:1) Katić; (yellow card) 83' Katić; 87' (4:0) Katić	Attendance: 10,000; Referee: (Switzerland) Roland Racine (Prilly)

=== European Cup ===
17 September 1975 Round 1, first leg	Újpesti Dózsa (Hungary)	4–0	(Switzerland) Zürich	Megyeri úti Stadion, Ujpest
20:00	Fazekas 10'; Dunai 12'; Tóth 56' (pen.); Kellner 78'	Report	(yellow card) 83' Heer	Attendance: 7,691; Referee: Doğan Babacan (Turkey)
Note: Summer-like warm weather. Újpest played the first half in their traditional purple kit, the second half in white due to TV coverage. Corners 6:7

1 October 1975 Return leg	Zürich (Switzerland)	5–1 (5–5 agg.)	(Hungary) Újpesti Dózsa	Letzigrund, Zürich
	Katić 2'; Risi 23', 38', 83'; Kühn 45'	Report	Nagy 57'	Attendance: 4,585; Referee: Adolf Prokop (East Germany)
Note: Rain. The Budapest team were wearing the red FCZ away kit, as they had brought white jerseys with them.

5–5 on aggregate; Újpesti Dózsa won on away goals.

=== Intertoto Cup ===
==== Group 4 matches ====
28 June 1975 Matchday 1	Zürich (Switzerland)	2–2	(Denmark) Vejle	Sportplatz Moos, Affoltern am Albis
	Scheiwiler 17' (1:0); Senn 64' (2:0)	FCZ summary	(yellow card) 75' Junker; 79' (2:1) Karl Aage Damsgaard; 89' (2:2 og) (Zigerlig)	Attendance: 1,500; Referee: (Switzerland) Roland Racine (Prilly)

5 July 1975 Matchday 2	Vojvodina (Socialist Federal Republic of Yugoslavia)	4–1	(Switzerland) Zürich	Novi Sad
	Vukašinović 8' (1:0); Srdanović 17' (2:0); Vučeković 75' (3:1); Vučeković 80' (4:1)	FCZ summary	44' (2:1) Katić	Attendance: 3,000; Referee: (Socialist Federal Republic of Yugoslavia) Milivoje Gugulović

12 July 1975 Matchday 3	Zürich (Switzerland)	1–0	(West Germany) Eintracht Braunschweig	Letzigrund, Zürich
17:00	Risi 82' (1:0)	FCZ summary		Attendance: 2,500; Referee: (Switzerland) Ernst Dörflinger (Grenchen)

19 July 1975 Matchday 4	Zürich (Switzerland)	0–0	(Socialist Federal Republic of Yugoslavia) Vojvodina	Letzigrund, Zürich
	Risi (yellow card)	FCZ summary	(yellow card) Jurčić	Attendance: 3,200; Referee: (Switzerland) André Favre (Echallens)

26 July 1975 Matchday 5	Vejle (Denmark)	0–2	(Switzerland) Zürich	Copenhagen
		FCZ summary	18' (0:1) Botteron; 56' (0:2) Martinelli	Attendance: 2,400; Referee: (Denmark) Kaj Rasmussen

29 July 1975 Matchday 6	Eintracht Braunschweig (West Germany)	2–0	(Switzerland) Zürich	Braunschweig
	Bründl 8' (1:0); Hollmann 66' (2:0)	FCZ summary

==== Final group table ====
Pos	Team	Pld	W	D	L	GF	GA	GD	Pts	EIN	VOJ	ZÜR	VEJ
1	(West Germany) Eintracht Braunschweig	6	4	0	2	13	5	+8	8	—	2–1	2–0	3–0
2	(Socialist Federal Republic of Yugoslavia) Vojvodina	6	3	1	2	14	8	+6	7	3–1	—	4–1	4–1
3	(Switzerland) Zürich	6	2	2	2	6	8	−2	6	1–0	0–0	—	2–2
4	(Denmark) Vejle	6	1	1	4	6	18	−12	3	0–5	2–2	0–2	—

Source: mogiel.net
Rules for classification: 1) Points; 2) Goal difference; 3) Goals scored; 4) Head-to-head points; 5) Away goals scored; 6) Draw.

=== Friendly matches ===
==== Pre- and mid-season ====
1 July 1975 Pre-season	Arminia Bielefeld	1–0	Zürich
	Goal	FCZ summary

2 August 1975 Pre-season	Aarau	1–3	Zürich	Paul-Walser-Stiftung, Wohlen, Aargau
17:30	(1:3)	FCZ summary	(0:1) Katić (0:2) Risi (0:3) Friedhelm Konietzka

6 August 1975 Pre-season	FC Wiedikon	2–8	Zürich	Heuried, Wiedikon, Zürich
18:15	Goal	FCZ summary	(0:1) Katić (0:2) Katić (0:3) Katić (0:4) Rutschmann (0:5) Rutschmann (0:6) Martinelli (0:7) Katić (0:8) Anthon	Attendance: 1,000; Referee: (Switzerland) Rudolf Affolter, Bülach
Note: FC Wiedikon played the 1975/76 season in der 2. Liga (fourth-tier).

19 August 1975 Mid-season	Valencia CF	0–1	Zürich	Mestalla Stadium, Valencia
		FCZ summary	35' (0:1) Risi	Attendance: 40,000
Note: 1st match in the Trofeo Naranja (Valencia CF's summer tournament since 1959). Very hot weather.

20 August 1975 Mid-season	Zürich	3–4	ADO Den Haag	Mestalla Stadium, Valencia
	Risi 30' (1:2); Risi 47' (2:2); Rutschmann 75' (3:2)	FCZ summary	22' (0:1) Schoenmaker; 25' (0:2) Korevaar; 81' (3:3) Dojčin Perazić; 83' (3:4) Vreeswijk	Attendance: 10,000
Note: 2nd match in the Trofeo Naranja (Valencia CF's summer tournament). Humid, with light rain during the game.

26 August 1975 Mid-season	FC Schlieren	0–8	Zürich
		FCZ summary	22' (0:1) Katić; 34' (0:2) Marti; 43' (pen.) Marti; 46' (0:4) Martinelli; 70' (0:5) Stierli	Attendance: 600
Note: FC Schlieren played the 1975/76 season in the 2. Liga (fourth-tier)

==== Winter break and mid-season ====
1 February 1976 Winter break	Luzern	1–3	Zürich	Stadion Allmend, Luzern
	Krenz 24' (1:1)	FCZ summary	13' (0:1) Stierli; 41' (1:2) Kuhn; 83' (1:3) Heer	Attendance: 230; Referee: (Switzerland) Bruno Burgener (Kriens)
Note: Winter conditions. Pitch covered in snow.

7 February 1976 Winter break	Chiasso	0–4	Zürich	Stadio Comunale Riva IV, Chiasso
		FCZ summary	30' (pen.) Risi; 64' (0:2) Fischbach; 65' (0:3) Kuhn; 70' (0:4) Rutschmann	Attendance: 300; Referee: (Switzerland) Attilio Bignasca (Lugano)
Note: Dangerously slippery ground

8 February 1976 Winter break	Bellinzona	0–0	Zürich	Stadio Comunale Bellinzona, Bellinzona
		FCZ summary		Attendance: 500; Referee: (Switzerland) Prudente (Bellinzona)

18 February 1976 Winter break	Italian national football team	3–0	Zürich	Florence
	Anastasi 11' (1:0); Savoldi 53' (2:0); Savoldi 74' (5:0)	FCZ summary	(penalty missed) 30′ Risi	Attendance: 14,000

19 February 1976 Winter break	Lugano	2–2	Zürich	Cornaredo, Lugano
	Morselli 73' (1:2); Arigoni 85' (2:2)	FCZ summary	25' (0:1) Hohl; 60' (0:2) Anthon	Attendance: 500; Referee: (Switzerland) Prudente (Bellinzona)

6 June 1976 Mid-season	Karlsruher SC	3–1	Zürich	Hohentwielstadion, Singen
	Kübler 17' (1:1); Struth 53' (2:1); Kübler 60' (3:1)	FCZ summary	9' (0:1) Katić; (yellow card) 42' Botteron	Attendance: 4,500; Referee: (Germany) Schroth, Konstanz (Deutschland)

7 June 1976 Mid-season	Zürich	1–2	1. FC Kaiserslautern	Hohentwielstadion, Singen
	Chapuisat 87' (1:2)	FCZ summary	16' (pen. 0:1) Meier; 39' (0:2) Meier	Attendance: 4,000; Referee: (Germany) Manfred Ferro

== Sources and references ==
- dbFCZ Homepage
- Switzerland 1975–76 at RSSSF
- Swiss League Cup at RSSSF

Preceded by 1974–75	FC Zürich seasons	Succeeded by 1976–77
