= 1977–78 FC Zürich season =

FC Zürich
1977–78 season
- Owner: Edwin Nägeli
- Chairman: Edwin Nägeli
- Head coach: Friedhelm Konietzka
- Stadium: Letzigrund
- Nationalliga A: 5th
- Swiss Cup: Round 5
- 1977–78 Swiss League Cup: Semi-finals
- 1977–78 UEFA Cup: Round 2
- 1977 Intertoto Cup: 4th in group
- Top goalscorer: League: Franco Cucinotta (14); All: Franco Cucinotta (24)

The 1977–78 season was FC Zürich's 81st season in their existence, since their foundation in 1896. It was their 19th consecutive season in the top flight of Swiss football, following their promotion at the end of the 1957–58 season. They played their home games in the Letzigrund.

== Overview ==
The club's president at this time was Edwin Nägeli, who had held this position since 1957. The FCZ first team head-coach for the seventh consecutive season was the German Friedhelm Konietzka. The first team competed not only in the first-tier Nationalliga, but also competed in 1977–78 Swiss Cup and in the 1977–78 Swiss League Cup. Further, the team had qualified for the 1977–78 UEFA Cup. FCZ also entered into the 1977 Intertoto Cup.

== Players ==
The following is the list of the FCZ first team squad this season. It also includes players that were in the squad the day the season started on 13 August 1977, but subsequently left the club after that date.

Note: Flags indicate national team as defined under FIFA eligibility rules; some limited exceptions apply. Players may hold more than one non-FIFA nationality.

No.	Pos.	Nation	Player
1	GK	SUI	Karl Grob (league games: 31)
—	GK	SUI	Ruedi Hauser (league games: 1)
—	DF	SUI	Fritz Baur (league games: 22)
—	DF	SUI	Pierre-Albert Chapuisat (league games: 29)
—	DF	SUI	Alberto Erba (league games: 12)
—	DF	SUI	Pius Fischbach (league games: 29)
—	DF	SUI	Gianpietro Zappa (league games: 28)
—	DF	SUI	Ruedi Landolt (league games: 2)
—	DF	SUI	Heinz Lüdi (league games: 17)
—	DF	SUI	Giuseppe Sanfilippo (league games: 1)
—	DF	SUI	Pirmin Stierli (league games: 13)
—	DF	SUI	Gianpietro Zappa (league games: 28)

No.	Pos.	Nation	Player
—	MF	SUI	Georg Aliesch (league games: 3)
—	MF	SUI	René Botteron (league games: 32)
—	MF	SUI	Silvio Hartmann (league games: 1)
—	MF	SUI	Manfred Moser (league games: 22)
—	MF	SUI	Ernst Rutschmann (league games: 1)
—	MF	SUI	Fredi Scheiwiler (league games: 32)
—	MF	SUI	Conny Torstensson (league games: 24)
—	FW	SUI	Franco Cucinotta (league games: 30)
—	FW	SUI	Urs Dickenmann (league games: 1)
—	FW	SUI	Peter Risi (league games: 27)
—	FW	SUI	Hans-Peter Zwicker (league games: 12)

Players who left the squad

Note: Flags indicate national team as defined under FIFA eligibility rules; some limited exceptions apply. Players may hold more than one non-FIFA nationality.

No.	Pos.	Nation	Player
—	DF	SUI	Hilmar Zigerlig (to Young Fellows)
—	MF	SUI	Rosario Martinelli (to Chiasso)
—	MF	SUI	Albert Hohl (to reserve team)

No.	Pos.	Nation	Player
—	MF	SUI	Hans-Joachim Weller (to Young Fellows)
—	MF	SUI	Jakob Kuhn (retired)
—	FW	SUI	Ilija Katić (to Burgos)

== Results ==
Legend

Win Draw Loss Postponed

=== Nationalliga ===
==== Qualifying phase matches ====
13 August 1977 Round 1	Zürich	5–1	Young Fellows	Letzigrund, Zürich
	Zappa 8' (1:0); Cucinotta 10' (2:0); Cucinotta 37' (3:0); Zappa (yellow card) 51'; Erba 55' (4:1); Zappa 66' (5:1)	FCZ summary	40' (3:1) Fleury; (yellow card) 70' Fleury	Attendance: 8,600; Referee: (Switzerland) André Daina (Éclépens)
Note: Corners: 14:1

20 August 1977 Round 2	Xamax	1–2	Zürich	Stade de la Maladière, Neuchâtel
	Bonny (yellow card) 24'; Elsig 81' (pen.)	FCZ summary	(yellow card) 13' Scheiwiler; (yellow card) 24' Heer; 76' (0:1) Cucinotta; (yellow card) 80' Grob; 90+1' (1:2) Risi	Attendance: 11,800; Referee: (Switzerland) Ernst Dörflinger (Grenchen and Basel)

24 August 1977 Round 3	Étoile Carouge	2–1	Zürich	Stade de la Fontenette, Carouge
	Dedominici (yellow card) 40'; Brodard 65' (1:1); Mouny 84' (2:1)	FCZ summary	4' (0:1) Moser	Attendance: 9,500; Referee: (Switzerland) Peter Scherz (Aegerten)
Note: Children had free entry.

27 August 1977 Round 4	Zürich	2–1	Young Boys	Letzigrund, Zürich
	(Burkhardt) 76' (o.g.)	FCZ summary	40' (pen 0:1) Lorenz	Attendance: 6,000; Referee: (Switzerland) André Favre (Échallens)

3 September 1977 Round 5	Zürich	1–2	Servette	Letzigrund, Zürich
	Risi 89' (pen. 1:2)	FCZ summary	22' (0:1) Trinchero; 34' (0:2) Schnyder	Attendance: 10,800; Referee: (Switzerland) Ernest Guignet (Yverdon-les-Bains)
Note: Corner: 9:1

17 September 1977 Round 6	Basel	2–2	Zürich	St. Jakob Stadium, Basel
20:00	Mundschin 6' (1:0); Maissen 64' (2:2)	FCZ summary FCB summary	32' (1:1) Moser; 40' (1:2) Cucinotta; (yellow card) 68' Baur; (yellow card) 90' Grob	Attendance: 12,500; Referee: (Switzerland) Gérard Racine (Biel/Bienne)
Note: Basel without Fischli (injured) and Muhmenthaler (reserves). Zurich without Fischbach, Heer, and Stierli (injured). Sport, 19.9.1977: «57th minute: an FCZ fan threw a firework onto the pitch in the Basel penalty area and he was taken away». 65th minute: Maradan was injured and from then on only plays a supporting role. An hour after the game ended, hundreds of FCB fans were still besieging the grandstand entrance and demonstrating against the referee, who left the stadium through a side entrance.

24 September 1977 Round 7	Zürich	0–0	St. Gallen	Letzigrund, Zürich
	Chapuisat (yellow card) 58'	FCZ summary	(yellow card) 69' Corminboeuf	Attendance: 4,000; Referee: (Switzerland) Bruno Galler (Kirchdorf, Bern)
Note: Corners 12:1

1 October 1977 Round 8	Sion	0–1	Zürich	Stade Tourbillon, Sion
	Balet (yellow card) 5'	FCZ summary	(yellow card) 35' Torstensson; 56' (0:1) Torstensson; (yellow card) 74' Baur	Attendance: 9,000; Referee: (Switzerland) Jean Dubach (Nidau)

8 October 1977 Round 9	Zürich	2–0	Lausanne-Sport	Letzigrund, Zürich
	Cucinotta 49' (1:0); Risi 49' (2:0)	FCZ summary		Attendance: 8,000; Referee: (Switzerland) Gottlieb Barmettler (Luzern)

15 October 1977 Round 10	Grasshopper Club	7–2	Zürich	Hardturm, Zürich
	Bauer 33' (1:1); Bauer 45' (2:2) (Torstensson) 66' (o.g.); Becker 68' (4:2); Sulser 74' (5:2); Elsener 80' (6:2); Hey 86' (7:2)	[ FCZ summary]	14' (0:1) Risi; 38' (1:2) Cucinotta	Attendance: 13,000; Referee: (Switzerland) Ernst Dörflinger (Grenchen and Basel)
Note: Corners: 4:12. 44' Grob saves penalty from Bauer, who then converted the rebound. Berbig saved penalty from Cucinotta.

22 October 1977 Round 11	Zürich	1–0	Chênois	Letzigrund, Zürich
	Chapuisat (yellow card) 38'; Grob (yellow card) 48' (Clivaz) 61' (o.g.)	FCZ summary		Attendance: 3,000; Referee: (Switzerland) A. Häring (Düdingen)

25 October 1977 Round 12	Young Fellows	1–3	Zürich	Stadion Brügglifeld, Aarau
	Weller 10' (1:0)	FCZ summary	30' (1:1) Torstensson; 46' (1:2) Moser; 70' (1:3) Cucinotta	Attendance: 5,000; Referee: (Switzerland) Jakob Baumann (Schaffhausen)

6 November 1977 Round 13	Zürich	1–1	Xamax	Letzigrund, Zürich
	Botteron 31' (1:1); Cucinotta (yellow card)	FCZ summary	19' (0:1) Decastel; (yellow card) 38' Decastel	Attendance: 6,000; Referee: (Switzerland) René Maire (Chêne-Bougeries, Genève)

12 November 1977 Round 14	Young Boys	0–1	Zürich	Wankdorf Stadium, Bern
		FCZ summary	74' (0:1) Scheiwiler	Attendance: 5,200; Referee: (Switzerland) André Daina (Éclépens)
Note: Corners: 5:16

20 November 1977 Round 15	Servette	0–2	Zürich	Charmilles Stadium, Geneva
		FCZ summary	7' (0:1) Cucinotta; 90' (0:2) Risi; (yellow card) 90' Cucinotta	Attendance: 12,800; Referee: (Switzerland) Ernst Dörflinger (Grenchen and Basel)

27 November 1977 Round 16	Zürich	1–1	Basel	Letzigrund, Zürich
14:30	Zwicker 15' (1:0); Lüdi (yellow card) 32'; Zappa (yellow card) 72'; Grob (yellow card) 78'	FCZ summary FCB summary	(yellow card) 42' Maradan; 78' (1:1) Schönenberger	Attendance: 11,500; Referee: (Switzerland) Rudolf Renggli (Luzern)
Note: Cold and snow flurries

3 December 1977 Round 17	St. Gallen	2–0	Zürich	Espenmoos, St. Gallen
	Ries 19' (1:0); Labhart 28' (2:0); Stöckl (yellow card) 68'	FCZ summary	(yellow card) 77' Heer	Attendance: 4,500; Referee: (Switzerland) Ernest Guignet (Yverdon-les-Bains)
Note: Pitch covered with snow, approximately 5 cm deep

11 December 1977 Round 18	Zürich	2–2	Sion	Letzigrund, Zürich
	Zwicker 15' (1:0); Stierli (yellow card) 35'; Risi 77' (pen.); Chapuisat (yellow card) 86'	FCZ summary	(yellow card) 35' Coutaz; 72' (1:1) Sarrasin; (yellow card) 80' In-Albon; 86' Đorđić	Attendance: 4,500; Referee: (Switzerland) Gérard Racine (La Neuveville)
Note: Deep, treacherous, and, in places, uneven terrain

26 February 1978 Round 19	Lausanne-Sport	1–1	Zürich	Olympique de la Pontaise, Lausanne
	Künzli 29' (1:0)	FCZ summary	56' (pen. 1:1) Botteron	Attendance: 7,000; Referee: (Switzerland) Jakob Baumann (Schaffhausen)

5 March 1978 Round 20	Zürich	1–2	Grasshopper Club	Letzigrund, Zürich
	Scheiwiler 44' (1:1)	FCZ summary	6' (0:1) Sulser; 56' (1:2) Bosco	Attendance: 12,500; Referee: (Switzerland) Bruno Galler (Kirchdorf, Bern)

19 March 1978 Round 21	Chênois	0–2	Zürich	Stade des Trois-Chêne, Thônex
		FCZ summary	10' (0:1) Scheiwiler; 53' (0:2) Cucinotta; (yellow card) 88' Heer	Attendance: 3,000; Referee: (Switzerland) Othmar Winter, (Martigny)

22 March 1978 Round 22	Zürich	5–1	Étoile Carouge	Letzigrund, Zürich
	Zwicker 7' (1:0); Torstensson 32' (2:0); Botteron 35' (3:0); Torstensson 63'; Risi 76' (pen.)	FCZ summary	88' (5:1) Parini	Attendance: 1,800; Referee: (Switzerland) Mario Osta (Oberuzwil)

==== Qualifying phase table ====
Pos	Team	Pld	W	D	L	GF	GA	GD	Pts	Qualification
1	Grasshopper Club	22	15	4	3	60	27	+33	34	To championship round
2	Servette	22	14	5	3	44	20	+24	33	To championship round
3	Lausanne-Sport	22	13	4	5	47	21	+26	30	To championship round
4	Basel	22	12	4	6	53	34	+19	28	To championship round
5	FC Zürich	22	11	6	5	38	27	+11	28	To championship round
6	Sion	22	6	9	7	29	33	−4	21	To championship round
7	Xamax	22	8	3	11	32	42	−10	19	To relegation play-out round
8	Young Boys	22	7	5	10	27	45	−18	19	To relegation play-out round
9	Chênois	22	8	2	12	27	35	−8	18	To relegation play-out round
10	St. Gallen	22	5	7	10	27	38	−11	17	To relegation play-out round
11	Étoile Carouge	22	5	3	14	22	40	−18	13	To relegation play-out round
12	Young Fellows Zürich	22	1	2	19	14	58	−44	4	To relegation play-out round

Source: rsssf.com
Rules for classification: 1) Points; 2) Goal difference; 3) Goals scored;

==== Championship group matches ====
1 April 1978 Round 1	Zürich	0–0	Servette	Letzigrund, Zürich
		FCZ summary	(yellow card) 45' Andrey; (yellow card) 65' Valentini	Attendance: 9,200; Referee: (Switzerland) Ernest Guignet (Yverdon-les-Bains)

8 April 1978 Round 2	Basel	1–1	Zürich	St. Jakob Stadium, Basel
20:00	Lauscher 45' (1:0)	FCZ summary FCB summary	(yellow card) 24' Zappa; (yellow card) 64' Fischbach; (yellow card) 78' Chapuisat; 90' (1:1) Risi	Attendance: 12,000; Referee: (Switzerland) Bruno Galler (Kirchdorf, Bern)

15 April 1978 Round 3	Zürich	1–3	Grasshopper Club	Letzigrund, Zürich
	Botteron 22' (1:1)	FCZ summary	6' (0:1) Hermann; 14' (0:2) Ponte; 88' (1:3) Elsener; (yellow card) 14' (yellow-red card) 89' Chapuisat	Attendance: 10,000; Referee: (Switzerland) Hans Wolfer (Volketswil)

9 April 1978 Round 4	Lausanne-Sport	4–0	Zürich	Olympique de la Pontaise, Lausanne
	Künzli 11' (1:0); Künzli 27' (2:0); Favre 67' (3:0); Favre 69' (4:0)	FCZ summary		Attendance: 7,200; Referee: (Switzerland) Peter Scherz (Aegerten)

22 April 1978 Round 5	Zürich	4–2	Sion	Letzigrund, Zürich
	Scheiwiler 28' (1:1); Cucinotta 48' (2:2); Risi 58' (3:2); Cucinotta 77' (4:2)	FCZ summary	26' (0:1) Vergères; 47' (1:2) Đorđić	Attendance: 2,500; Referee: (Switzerland) Jean Dubach (Nidau)

29 April 1978 Round 6	Servette	1–2	Zürich	Charmilles Stadium, Geneva
	Chivers 19' (1:1); Chivers (penalty missed) 35′	FCZ summary	4' (0:1) Cucinotta; 89' (1:2) Cucinotta	Attendance: 5,500; Referee: (Switzerland) Rudolf Renggli (Luzern)

6 May 1978 Round 7	Zürich	4–2	Basel	Letzigrund, Zürich
20:00	Scheiwiler 22' (1:0); Risi 35' (2:0); Scheiwiler 61' (3:0); Botteron 88' (4:2)	FCZ summary FCB summary	64' (3:1) Demarmels; 74' (3:2) Marti	Attendance: 11,000; Referee: (Switzerland) Bruno Galler (Kirchdorf, Bern)

20 May 1978 Round 8	Grasshopper Club	1–0	Zürich	Hardturm, Zürich
	Grob (yellow card) 83'	FCZ summary	81' (0:1) Montandon	Attendance: 12,500; Referee: (Switzerland) André Daina (Éclépens)

24 May 1978 Round 9	Zürich	2–1	Lausanne-Sport	Letzigrund, Zürich
	Risi 48' (1:0); Botteron 81' (2:0)	FCZ summary	(yellow card) 67' Devčić; 85' (2:1) Künzli	Attendance: 5,000; Referee: (Switzerland) Walter Hungerbühler (St. Gallen)

22 May 1978 Round 10	Sion	0–1	Zürich	Stade Tourbillon, Sion
		FCZ summary	27' (0:1) Risi	Attendance: 2,000; Referee: (Switzerland) René Maire (Chêne-Bougeries, Genève)

==== Championship table ====
Pos	Team	Pld	W	D	L	GF	GA	GD	BP	Pts	Qualification
1	Grasshopper Club	10	4	4	2	17	12	+5	17	29	Swiss Champions, qualified for 1978–79 European Cup and entered 1978 Intertoto Cup
2	Servette	10	3	5	2	10	10	0	17	28	Swiss Cup winners, qualified for 1978–79 Cup Winners' Cup
3	Basel	10	5	3	2	21	14	+7	14	27	Qualified for 1978–79 UEFA Cup
4	Lausanne-Sport	10	4	3	3	21	14	+7	15	26	Qualified for 1978–79 UEFA Cup
5	Zürich	10	5	2	3	15	15	0	14	26	Entered 1978 Intertoto Cup
6	Sion	10	0	1	9	8	27	−19	11	12	Entered 1978 Intertoto Cup

Source: rsssf.com
Rules for classification: 1) Points; 2) Goal difference; 3) Goals scored;

=== Swiss Cup ===
10 September 1977 Round 4	Muttenz	1–4	Zürich	Sportplatz Margelacker, Muttenz
14:30	Peter Bruderer 4' (1:0)	FCZ summary	35' (1:1) Chapuisat; 36' (1:2) Torstensson; 65' (1:3) Scheiwiler; 88' (1:4) Cucinotta	Attendance: 5,500; Referee: (Switzerland) Alfred Heinis (Ammannsegg, Biberist)

12 October 1977 Round 5	Zürich	1–3	Basel	Letzigrund, Zürich
20:00	Cucinotta (yellow card) 45'; Baur 56' (1:2)	FCZ summary FCB summary	19' (0:1) Schönenberger; 49' (0:2) Schönenberger; 66' (1:3) Schönenberger; (yellow card) 72' Mundschin	Attendance: 14,000; Referee: (Switzerland) Peter Scherz (Aegerten)

=== Swiss League Cup ===
6 August 1977 Round 1	Zürich	9–0	Bellinzona	Letzigrund, Zürich
	Cucinotta 20' (1:0); Cucinotta 28' (2:0); Risi 41' (pen. 3:0); Fischbach 42' (4:0); Torstensson 46' (5:0); Risi 48' (6:0); Cucinotta 65' (7:0); Cucinotta 77' (8:0); Scheiwiler (9:0)	FCZ summary		Attendance: 1,588; Referee: (Switzerland) Jaberg (Thun)

12 February 1978 Round 2	Zürich	3–0	Young Fellows Zürich	Letzigrund, Zürich
	Cucinotta 38' (1:0); Zwicker 55' (2:0); Cucinotta 90' (3:0)	FCZ summary		Attendance: 1,200; Referee: (Switzerland) Wolfer (Volketswil)
Note: Rock-hard frozen and slippery ground

12 March 1978 Quarter-final	Lausanne-Sport	0–1	Zürich	Olympique de la Pontaise, Lausanne
		FCZ summary	9' (0:1) Scheiwiler	Attendance: 2,800; Referee: (Switzerland) Gottlieb Barmettler (Luzern)

9 May 1978 Semi-final	Grasshopper Club	5–1	Zürich	Hardturm, Zürich
	Ponte 13' (1:0); Ponte 43' (2:0); Bosco 68' (3:0); Ponte 70' (4:0); Hey 75' (5:0)	summary	(yellow card) 70' Chapuisat; 88' (5:1) Zwicker	Attendance: 3,700; Referee: (Switzerland) Jean Dubach (Nidau)

=== UEFA Cup ===
==== First round ====
14 September 1977 First leg	Zürich (Switzerland)	1–0	(Bulgaria) CSKA Sofia	Letzigrund, Zürich
	Risi 4'	Report		Attendance: 8,500; Referee: László Pádár (Hungary)

28 September 1977 Second leg	CSKA Sofia (Bulgaria)	1–1 (a.e.t.)	(Switzerland) Zürich	Stadion Balgarska Armia, Sofia
	Markov 32'	Report	Cucinotta 105'	Attendance: 20,000; Referee: Adolf Mathias (Austria)

Zürich won 2–1 on aggregate.

==== Second round ====
19 October 1977 First leg	Zürich (Switzerland)	0–3	(West Germany) Eintracht Frankfurt	Letzigrund, Zürich
		Report	Hölzenbein 28'; Wenzel 77'; Grabowski 90'	Attendance: 17,000; Referee: Vojtech Christov (Czechoslovakia)

2 November 1977 Second leg	Eintracht Frankfurt (West Germany)	4–3	(Switzerland) Zürich	Waldstadion, Frankfurt
	Kraus 1'; Grabowski 62'; Stepanović 68'; Krobbach 87'	Report	Risi 45' (pen.), 60'; Torstensson 78'	Attendance: 3,600; Referee: Anatoli Ivanov (Soviet Union)

Eintracht Frankfurt won 7–3 on aggregate.

=== Intertoto Cup ===
==== Group 3 matches ====
2 July 1977 Matchday 1	Inter Bratislava (Czechoslovakia)	5–0	(Switzerland) Zürich	Bratislava
	(1:0) (2:0) (3:0) (4:0) (5:0)	FCZ summary		Attendance: 2,600

9 July 1977 Matchday 2	Eintracht Frankfurt (West Germany)	4–1	(Switzerland) Zürich	Waldstadion, Frankfurt
	Hölzenbein 26' (1:0); Kraus 65' (2:1); Hölzenbein 80' (3:1); Neuberger 86'	FCZ summary Eintracht summary	57' (1:1) Torstensson	Attendance: 5,500; Referee: (West Germany) Heinz Aldinger (Waiblingen)

16 July 1977 Matchday 3	Zürich (Switzerland)	1–2	(Czechoslovakia) Inter Bratislava	Letzigrund, Zürich
	Cucinotta 11' (pen 1:1)	FCZ summary	3' (0:1) Brezik; 75' (1:2) Ladislav Petráš	Attendance: 2,500; Referee: (Switzerland) Rudolf Renggli (Luzern)

20 July 1977 Matchday 4	Zürich (Switzerland)	1–0	(West Germany) Eintracht Frankfurt	Letzigrund, Zürich
	Cucinotta 10' (1:0)	FCZ summary Eintracht summary		Attendance: 3,500; Referee: (Switzerland) Ernst Dörflinger (Grenchen)

23 July 1977 Matchday 5	SSW Innsbruck (Austria)	3–0	(Switzerland) Zürich	Tivoli, Innsbruck
	Welzl 29' (1:0); Zanon 35' (2:0); Lercher 45' (pen.)	FCZ summary		Attendance: 5,000; Referee: (Austria) Wolfgang Klocker

30 July 1977 Matchday 6	Zürich (Switzerland)	1–2	(Austria) SSW Innsbruck	Letzigrund, Zürich
	Moser 65' (1:2)	FCZ summary	12' (0:1) Oberacher; 52' (0:2) Oberacher	Attendance: 2,800; Referee: (Switzerland) René Kellenberger (Herisau)

==== Final group table ====
Pos	Team	Pld	W	D	L	GF	GA	GD	Pts	BRA	EIN	WAC	ZÜR
1	(Czechoslovakia) Inter Bratislava	6	4	1	1	18	11	+7	9	—	2–5	4–2	5–0
2	(West Germany) Eintracht Frankfurt	6	2	3	1	13	8	+5	7	2–2	—	1–1	4–1
3	(Austria) SSW Innsbruck	6	2	2	2	10	10	0	6	1–3	1–1	—	3–0
4	(Switzerland) Zürich	6	1	0	5	4	16	−12	2	1–2	1–0	1–2	—

Source: mogiel.net
Rules for classification: 1) Points; 2) Goal difference; 3) Goals scored; 4) Head-to-head points; 5) Away goals scored; 6) Draw.

=== Friendly matches ===
==== Pre-season ====
3 August 1977 Exhibition game	Young Boys	2–4	Zürich	Wankdorf Stadium, Bern
	Lorenz 27' (1:1); Lorenz 60' (2:1)	FCZ summary	2' (0:1) Cucinotta; 67' (2:2) Risi; 70' (2:3) Scheiwiler; 82' (2:4) Torstensson	Attendance: 7,000; Referee: (Switzerland) André Favre (Échallens)
Note: Semi-final of the Bern tournament.

9 August 1978 Exhibition game	Grasshopper Club	3–2	Zürich	Wankdorf Stadium, Bern
	Elsener 21' (1:1); Ponte 32' (2:1); Sulser 44' (3:1)	FCZ summary	4' (0:1) Risi; 66' (3:2) Risi; (yellow card) 83' Chapuisat	Attendance: 4,000; Referee: (Switzerland) Rudolf Renggli (Luzern)
Note: Final des Berner Turniers.

16 August 1977 Exhibition game	Zürich	5–1	Aarau	Sportplatz, Muhen
	Cucinotta 51' (1:0); Fischbach 53' (2:0); Botteron 56' (3:0); Cucinotta 62' (4:0); Moser 72' (5:1)	FCZ summary	70' (4:1) Lamm	Referee: (Switzerland) Franz Gächter (Aarau, Suhr, Aargau)
Note: Inauguration of the new sports field in Muhen. After 73 minutes, the referee abandoned the match in the middle of a downpour, even before the field lights went out. Due to personnel problems, Aarau fielded four players from the second-division club Brugg (von Allmen, Grogg, Lamm, and Jufer).

==== Winter break ====
19 January 1978 Exhibition game	Zürich	5–2	Luzern	Schlieren, Switzerland
	Scheiwiler 28' (1:1); Botteron 35' (2:1); Lüdi 42' (3:2); Botteron 48' (pen.); Zwicker 56' (5:2)	FCZ summary	10' (pen.) Rahmen; 37' (2:2) Wiprächtiger	Attendance: 500; Referee: (Switzerland) Rudolf Affolter (Bülach)

4 February 1978 Exhibition game	Zürich	2–2	Bellinzona	Sportplatz auf der Mülligen, Zürich
	Botteron 7' (1:0); Risi 50' (2:0)	FCZ summary	75' (2:1) Maccini; 86' (2:2) Rossi	Attendance: 400; Referee: (Switzerland) Rudolf Affolter (Bülach)

2 March 1978 Exhibition game	Luzern	2–3	Zürich	Hubelmatt, Luzern
	Blättler 59' (1:1); Fischer 75' (2:1); Weder (yellow card)	FCZ summary	(yellow card) 28' Chapuisat; 30' (0:1) Cucinotta; 81' (pen.) Botteron; 87' (2:3) Botteron	Attendance: 90; Referee: (Switzerland) Peter Aschwanden (Luzern)

== Sources and references ==
- dbFCZ Homepage
- Switzerland 1977–78 at RSSSF
- Swiss League Cup at RSSSF

Preceded by 1976–77	FC Zürich seasons	Succeeded by 1978–79
