= 1976–77 Swiss League Cup =

Tournament details
- Country: Switzerland
- Teams: 32

Final positions
- Champions: Servette
- Runners-up: Xamax

Tournament statistics
- Matches played: 31

The 1976–77 Swiss League Cup was the fifth edidition of the Swiss League Cup competition. The first round was played in summer 1976 as a pre-season warm-up to the 1976–77 Swiss football season, the later rounds were played during the season.

== Overview ==
The League Cup had been created four seasons earlier to allow clubs from the top two tiers to compete in a tournament in advance of the league season, with the semi-finals and final played in the Autumn. But this season only the first round was played in advance of the season, the later rounds were played in the second half of the league season.

The matches were played in a single knockout format. In the event of a draw after 90 minutes, the match went into extra time. In the event of a draw at the end of extra time, a penalty shoot-out was to decide which team qualified for the next round. No replays were foreseen.

== First round ==
=== Summary ===
Team 1	Score	Team 2
7 August 1977
FC Frauenfeld	0–6	St. Gallen
Grasshopper Club	4–4 (a.e.t.) (4–3 p)	Zürich
Gossau	2–4	Winterthur
Aarau	1–1 (a.e.t.) (5–4 p)	Kriens
Luzern	3–0	Young Fellows Zürich
Chênois	4–2	Lausanne-Sport
Stade Lausanne	2–6	Etoile Carouge
Sion	0–1	Servette
Vevey-Sports	3–2 (a.e.t.)	FC Raron
Lugano	1–2	Bellinzona
Xamax	1–0	Biel-Bienne
Laufen	1–4	Young Boys
Fribourg	4–3 (a.e.t.)	Nordstern Basel
Grenchen	1–2	Basel
Köniz	0–1	La Chaux-de-Fonds
7 August 1977
Mendrisiostar	0–0 (a.e.t.) (3–2 p)	Chiasso

=== Matches ===
7 August 1977

Grasshopper Club	4–4 (a.e.t.)	Zürich
Bauer 28' (1:1); Bauer 43' (2:1); Seiler 45' (3:2); Bigi Meyer 83' (4:3)	FCZ summary	13' (0:1) Kuhn; 45' (pen. 2:2) Risi; 58' (3:3) P. Stierli; 88' (4:4) Kuhn
Penalties
Gross (penalty missed); Bigi Meyer (penalty scored); Ponte (penalty scored); Bauer (penalty scored); Cornioley (penalty scored)	4–3	(penalty scored) Risi; (penalty scored) Kuhn; (penalty missed) Botteron; (penalty scored) Zigerlig; (penalty missed) Grob

Hardturm, Zürich
Attendance: 12,000
Referee: (Switzerland) Walter Hungerbühler (St. Gallen)

7 August 1977

Aarau	1–1 (a.e.t.)	Kriens
Dries 113' (1:0)	FCA summary	119' (1:1) Perdon
Penalties
Penalty scored	5–4	Penalty scored Penalty missed

Stadion Brügglifeld, Aarau

7 August 1977

Sion	0–1	Servette
	Servette summary	(0:1) Chivers

Stade Tourbillon, Sion

7 August 1977

Laufen	1–4	Young Boys
Lüdi 84' (1:4)	summary	5' (0:1) Conz; 13' (0:2) Conz; 36' (0:3) Burkhardt; 56' (0:4) Küttel

Sportplatz Nau, Laufen
Attendance: 1,500
Referee: (Switzerland) Jean Dubach (Nidau)

7 August 1976
20:15

Grenchen	1–2	Basel
Kodric 35' (1:1)	FCB summary	22' (0:1) Marti; 78' (1:2) Stohler

Stadium Brühl, Grenchen
Attendance: 1,700
Referee: (Switzerland) André Daina (Éclépens)

== Second round ==
=== Summary ===
Team 1	Score	Team 2
12 February 1977
Vevey-Sports	0–1	Chênois
St. Gallen	0–2	Grasshopper Club
Étoile Carouge	0–2	Fribourg
Xamax	4–1	La Chaux-de-Fonds
13 February 1977
Aarau	3–1	Mendrisiostar
Luzern	2–2 (a.e.t.) (4–3 p)	Basel
Young Boys	1–2	Servette
Bellinzona	0–2	Winterthur

=== Matches ===
13 February 1977

Aarau	3–1	Mendrisiostar
Goal	FCA summary	Goal

Stadion Brügglifeld, Aarau

13 February 1977
14:30

Luzern	2–2 (a.e.t.)	Basel
Waeber 53' (1:0); Christen 117' (2:2)	Summary	85' (1:1) Marti; 93' (1:2) Maissen
Penalties
Penalty scored Penalty missed	4–3	Penalty scored Penalty missed

Stadion Allmend, Luzern
Attendance: 1,800
Referee: (Switzerland) Attilio Bignasca Lugano

13 February 1977

Young Boys	1–2	Servette
Conz 18' (1:0)	YB summary Servette summary	33' (1:1) Müller; 76' (1:2) Müller

Wankdorf Stadium, Bern
Attendance: 6.000
Referee: (Switzerland) Favre

== Quarter-finals ==
=== Summary ===
Team 1	Score	Team 2
19 February 1977
Fribourg	0–2	Servette
Winterthur	0–1	Chênois
Aarau	0–1	Xamax
Luzern	0–2	Grasshopper Club

=== Matches ===
19 February 1977

Fribourg	0–2	Servette
	summary	20' (0:1) Chivers; 86' (0:2) Barberis

Stade Universitaire, Fribourg

19 February 1977

Winterthur	0–1	Chênois
	RSSSF summary	86' (0:1) Riner

Schützenwiese, Winterthur

19 February 1977

Aarau	0–1	Xamax
	FCA summary	17' (0:1) Elsig

Stadion Brügglifeld, Aarau

19 February 1977

Luzern	0–2	Grasshopper Club
	RSSSF summary	15' (0:1) Bosco; 90' (0:2) Bosco

Stadion Allmend, Luzern

== Semi-finals ==
=== Summary ===
Team 1	Score	Team 2
19 April 1977
Servette	2–1	Grasshopper Club
Xamax	4–3 (a.e.t.)	Chênois

=== Matches ===
19 April 1977

Servette	2–1	Grasshopper Club
Pfister 22' (1:1); Bizzini 83' (2:1)	Servette summary	11' (pen. 0:1) Bauer

Charmilles Stadium, Geneva

19 April 1977

Xamax	4–3 (a.e.t.)	Chênois
Gress 71' (1:2); Elsig 76' (2:2); Decastel 93' (3:2); Decastel 104' (4:2)	RSSSF summary	20' (0:1) Manai; 59' (0:2) Manai; 119' (4:3) Porto

Stade de la Maladière (1924), Neuchâtel

== Final ==
The final was held at the Olympique de la Pontaise in Lausanne on 3 May 1977.

=== Summary ===
Team 1	Score	Team 2
3 May 1977
Servette	2–0	Xamax

=== Telegram ===
3 May 1977

Servette	2–0	Xamax
Müller 50' (1:0); Thouvenel 75' (2:0)	RSSSF summary

Olympique de la Pontaise, Lausanne
Attendance: 7,100
Referee: (Switzerland) Otto Isler (Zürich)

Servette won the cup and this was the club's first League Cup title to this date.

== Further in Swiss football ==
- 1976–77 Nationalliga A
- 1976–77 Swiss 1. Liga
- 1976–77 Swiss Cup
