= 1976 Intertoto Cup =

Tournament details
- Teams: 44

Final positions
- Champions: Group winners Young Boys; Hertha Berlin; Union Teplice; Baník Ostrava; Zbrojovka Brno; Spartak Trnava; Inter Bratislava; Öster; Djurgården; Vojvodina; Widzew Łódź

Tournament statistics
- Matches played: 132

In the 1976 Intertoto Cup no knock-out rounds were contested, and therefore no winner was declared. This edition marked the first time teams from Israel and Norway took part.

== Group stage ==
The teams were divided into eleven groups of four teams each.

=== Group 1 ===
Pos	Team	Pld	W	D	L	GF	GA	GD	Pts	YB	MAL	BEI	ADM
1	(Switzerland) Young Boys	6	3	3	0	15	9	+6	9	—	3–2	6–3	1–1
2	(Sweden) Malmö FF	6	2	3	1	13	6	+7	7	1–1	—	3–1	6–0
3	(Israel) Beitar Jerusalem	6	2	2	2	12	13	−1	6	1–1	1–1	—	3–1
4	(Austria) Admira/Wacker Wien	6	0	2	4	4	16	−12	2	1–3	0–0	1–3	—

Source: mogiel.net
Rules for classification: 1) Points; 2) Goal difference; 3) Goals scored; 4) Head-to-head points; 5) Away goals scored; 6) Draw.

=== Group 2 ===
Pos	Team	Pld	W	D	L	GF	GA	GD	Pts	HER	STA	HBS	KØGE
1	(West Germany) Hertha Berlin	6	4	1	1	20	6	+14	9	—	2–0	5–1	5–0
2	(Belgium) Standard Liège	6	4	1	1	11	4	+7	9	1–0	—	3–1	6–1
3	(Israel) Hapoel Be'er Sheva	6	1	3	2	8	13	−5	5	3–3	0–0	—	2–1
4	(Denmark) Køge	6	0	1	5	4	20	−16	1	1–5	0–1	1–1	—

Source: mogiel.net
Rules for classification: 1) Points; 2) Goal difference; 3) Goals scored; 4) Head-to-head points; 5) Away goals scored; 6) Draw.

=== Group 3 ===
Pos	Team	Pld	W	D	L	GF	GA	GD	Pts	TEP	KIC	GCZ	LAN
1	(Czechoslovakia) Union Teplice	6	3	2	1	10	4	+6	8	—	2–0	4–1	0–0
2	(West Germany) Kickers Offenbach	6	4	0	2	6	6	0	8	0–3	—	1–0	1–0
3	(Switzerland) Grasshopper Club	6	2	1	3	4	7	−3	5	2–0	0–2	—	1–0
4	(Sweden) Landskrona	6	0	3	3	2	5	−3	3	1–1	1–2	0–0	—

Source: mogiel.net
Rules for classification: 1) Points; 2) Goal difference; 3) Goals scored; 4) Head-to-head points; 5) Away goals scored; 6) Draw.

=== Group 4 ===
Pos	Team	Pld	W	D	L	GF	GA	GD	Pts	OST	WAC	EIN	AIK
1	(Czechoslovakia) Baník Ostrava	6	5	1	0	9	2	+7	11	—	2–1	0–0	2–0
2	(Austria) SSW Innsbruck	6	2	2	2	10	9	+1	6	1–2	—	1–0	3–1
3	(West Germany) Eintracht Braunschweig	6	2	2	2	6	6	0	6	0–2	1–1	—	2–1
4	(Sweden) AIK	6	0	1	5	6	14	−8	1	0–1	3–3	1–3	—

Source: mogiel.net
Rules for classification: 1) Points; 2) Goal difference; 3) Goals scored; 4) Head-to-head points; 5) Away goals scored; 6) Draw.

=== Group 5 ===
Pos	Team	Pld	W	D	L	GF	GA	GD	Pts	BRN	DUI	ZÜR	AWI
1	(Czechoslovakia) Zbrojovka Brno	6	5	0	1	13	9	+4	10	—	1–0	1–0	7–3
2	(West Germany) Duisburg	6	3	2	1	13	4	+9	8	5–1	—	3–1	4–0
3	(Switzerland) Zürich	6	2	1	3	9	8	+1	5	0–1	0–0	—	4–1
4	Austria Wien	6	0	1	5	8	22	−14	1	1–2	1–1	2–4	—

Source: mogiel.net
Rules for classification: 1) Points; 2) Goal difference; 3) Goals scored; 4) Head-to-head points; 5) Away goals scored; 6) Draw.

26 June 1976
Matchday 1

Zbrojovka Brno (Czechoslovakia)	1–0	(Switzerland) Zürich
Hamár 85' (1:0)	FCZ summary

Brno
Attendance: 2,500
Referee: (Czechoslovakia) Rozhodoj

3 July 1976
Matchday 2

Zürich (Switzerland)	4–1	Austria Wien
Scheiwiler 14' (1:0); P. Stierli 27' (2:0); Cucinotta 43' (3:0); Risi 82' (4:1)	FCZ summary	62' (3:1) Pospischil; (yellow card) Pirkner; (yellow card) Prohaska

Sportplatz, Sarmenstorf
Attendance: 2,500
Referee: (Switzerland) Ernst Dörflinger (Grenchen)

11 July 1976
Matchday 3

Zürich (Switzerland)	0–0	(West Germany) Duisburg
Katić (yellow card) 25'; Chapuisat (yellow card) 71'	FCZ summary	(yellow card) 81' Seliger

Letzigrund, Zürich
Attendance: 4,000
Referee: (Switzerland) Bruno della Bruna (Lumino)

17 July 1976
Matchday 4

Austria Wien	2–4	(Switzerland) Zürich
Weiss 50' (1:3); Pöll 73' (2:4)	FCZ summary	14' (0:1) Risi; 20' (0:2) Risi; 41' (0:3) Cucinotta; 72' (1:4) Cucinotta

Wiener Sportclub grounds, Vienna
Attendance: 1,000
Referee: (Austria) Andreas Siegl

24 July 1976
Matchday 5

Duisburg (West Germany)	3–1	(Switzerland) Zürich
Dietz 71' (pen 1:1); Worm 82' (2:1); Suchanek 86' (3:1)	FCZ summary	65' (0:1) Risi

Dinslaken
Attendance: 6,000

27 July 1976
Matchday 6

Zürich (Switzerland)	0–1	(Czechoslovakia) Zbrojovka Brno
	FCZ summary	73' (0:1) Pešice

Sportplatz, Weesen, Switzerland
Attendance: 2,400
Referee: (Switzerland) Walter Hungerbühler (St. Gallen)

=== Group 6 ===
Pos	Team	Pld	W	D	L	GF	GA	GD	Pts	TRV	ÅTV	LIL	SAL
1	(Czechoslovakia) Spartak Trnava	6	5	1	0	17	5	+12	11	—	3–1	5–1	2–0
2	(Sweden) Åtvidaberg	6	2	2	2	10	8	+2	6	1–3	—	3–1	4–0
3	(Norway) Lillestrøm	6	1	2	3	5	11	−6	4	1–1	0–0	—	1–0
4	Austria Salzburg	6	1	1	4	4	12	−8	3	1–3	1–1	2–1	—

Source: mogiel.net
Rules for classification: 1) Points; 2) Goal difference; 3) Goals scored; 4) Head-to-head points; 5) Away goals scored; 6) Draw.

=== Group 7 ===
Pos	Team	Pld	W	D	L	GF	GA	GD	Pts	BRA	VIT	OOS	HOL
1	(Czechoslovakia) Inter Bratislava	6	5	0	1	19	4	+15	10	—	4–0	2–1	2–1
2	(Portugal) Vitória Guimarães	6	4	0	2	11	8	+3	8	1–0	—	4–1	4–0
3	(Belgium) Oostende	6	3	0	3	10	13	−3	6	1–6	2–0	—	2–1
4	(Denmark) Holbæk	6	0	0	6	3	18	−15	0	0–5	1–2	0–3	—

Source: mogiel.net
Rules for classification: 1) Points; 2) Goal difference; 3) Goals scored; 4) Head-to-head points; 5) Away goals scored; 6) Draw.

=== Group 8 ===
Pos	Team	Pld	W	D	L	GF	GA	GD	Pts	ÖST	BEL	PSZ	NÆS
1	(Sweden) Öster	6	5	1	0	13	2	+11	11	—	2–1	1–0	5–0
2	(Portugal) Belenenses	6	2	2	2	7	6	+1	6	1–1	—	2–0	0–1
3	(Poland) Pogoń Szczecin	6	1	2	3	6	7	−1	4	0–1	2–2	—	3–0
4	(Denmark) Næstved	6	1	1	4	2	13	−11	3	0–3	0–1	1–1	—

Source: mogiel.net
Rules for classification: 1) Points; 2) Goal difference; 3) Goals scored; 4) Head-to-head points; 5) Away goals scored; 6) Draw.

=== Group 9 ===
Pos	Team	Pld	W	D	L	GF	GA	GD	Pts	DJU	STU	STG	RYB
1	(Sweden) Djurgården	6	3	1	2	11	8	+3	7	—	3–0	3–2	3–0
2	(Austria) Sturm Graz	6	3	1	2	8	8	0	7	1–0	—	1–1	2–1
3	(Switzerland) St. Gallen	6	2	2	2	9	8	+1	6	0–0	2–1	—	4–1
4	(Poland) Rybnik	6	2	0	4	10	14	−4	4	5–2	1–3	2–0	—

Source: mogiel.net
Rules for classification: 1) Points; 2) Goal difference; 3) Goals scored; 4) Head-to-head points; 5) Away goals scored; 6) Draw.

=== Group 10 ===
Pos	Team	Pld	W	D	L	GF	GA	GD	Pts	VOJ	ZSO	LNZ	ÖRE
1	(Socialist Federal Republic of Yugoslavia) Vojvodina	6	4	2	0	11	6	+5	10	—	2–1	3–2	1–1
2	(Poland) Zagłębie Sosnowiec	6	2	2	2	11	8	+3	6	1–2	—	1–1	5–1
3	(Austria) VÖEST Linz	6	1	2	3	9	10	−1	4	0–2	1–2	—	4–1
4	(Sweden) Örebro	6	0	4	2	6	13	−7	4	1–1	1–1	1–1	—

Source: mogiel.net
Rules for classification: 1) Points; 2) Goal difference; 3) Goals scored; 4) Head-to-head points; 5) Away goals scored; 6) Draw.

=== Group 11 ===
Pos	Team	Pld	W	D	L	GF	GA	GD	Pts	WID	KB	KOŠ	STA
1	(Poland) Widzew Łódź	6	6	0	0	21	5	+16	12	—	9–1	2–0	1–0
2	(Denmark) KB	6	2	1	3	7	18	−11	5	1–3	—	3–2	0–3
3	(Czechoslovakia) Košice	6	2	0	4	6	8	−2	4	0–1	1–2	—	2–0
4	(Norway) Start	6	1	1	4	6	9	−3	3	3–5	0–0	0–1	—

Source: mogiel.net
Rules for classification: 1) Points; 2) Goal difference; 3) Goals scored; 4) Head-to-head points; 5) Away goals scored; 6) Draw.

== See also ==
- 1976–77 European Cup
- 1976–77 UEFA Cup Winners' Cup
- 1976–77 UEFA Cup
