= Chapuisat =

Chapuisat (English: /ʃæpwiːˈzɑː/, French: [ʃapɥiza]) is a surname. Notable people with the surname include:

- Pierre-Albert Chapuisat (born 1948), Swiss footballer and manager
- Stéphane Chapuisat (born 1969), Swiss footballer
