= Slobodan Vučeković =

Montenegrin footballer and manager

Personal information
- Date of birth: 15 December 1953 (age 72)
- Place of birth: Danilovgrad, SFR Yugoslavia
- Height: 1.84 m (6 ft 0 in)
- Position: Forward

Senior career*
Years	Team	Apps	(Gls)
1970–1971	Vojvodina	2	(0)
1971–1973	Maribor	58	(26)
1973–1979	Vojvodina	95	(32)
1979–1980	Bastia	24	(5)
1979–1980	Bastia B	4	(3)
1981–1984	Doxa Drama	66	(22)
Total		249	(88)

Managerial career
- 1990–1991: Doxa Drama
- 1993–1994: Enosis Neon Paralimni
- 1996–1998: Ethnikos Achna
- 1999: APOEL
- 1999–2001: Nea Salamis
- 2001: Ethnikos Achna
- 2002–2003: Enosis Neon Paralimni
- 2004: Ethnikos Achna
- 2009: Srem
- 2012-2014: Srem
- * Club domestic league appearances and goals

Slobodan Vučeković (Serbian Cyrillic: Слободан Вучековић; born 15 December 1953) is a Montenegrin football manager and former player.

== Playing career ==
Born in Danilovgrad, SR Montenegro, SFR Yugoslavia, he played most of the 1970s with FK Vojvodina in the Yugoslav First League, although he also had a spell in between with NK Maribor during the early 1970s. In NK Maribor he played 58 matches scoring 26 goals. While playing with Vojvodina he won the Mitropa Cup in 1977. In 1979, he moved abroad to France and played one season with SC Bastia in the Ligue 1. Later in 1981 he joined Greek top-tier club Alpha Ethniki where he stayed until 1984.

== Coaching career ==
In 2009, he took charge as a coach of FK Srem in the Serbian League Vojvodina.

== Honours ==
Vojvodina

- UEFA Intertoto Cup: 1976
- Mitropa Cup: 1977

APOEL

- Cypriot Cup: 1999
