= Jean-Marie Conz =

Swiss footballer and manager (born 1953)

Personal information
- Date of birth: 12 September 1953 (age 73)
- Place of birth: Porrentruy, Switzerland
- Height: 1.75 m (5 ft 9 in)
- Position: Defender

Senior career*
Years	Team	Apps	(Gls)
1971–1973	FC Porrentruy		
1973–1988	BSC Young Boys		
1988–1989	SR Delémont		

International career
1976–1982	Switzerland	3	(0)

Managerial career
- 1992–1993: SR Delémont
- 1995–1997: BSC Young Boys
- * Club domestic league appearances and goals

Jean-Marie Conz (born 12 September 1953) is a Swiss retired football defender and later manager.

== Honours ==
- Swiss Super League:
  - Winner: 1985–86
- Swiss Super Cup:
  - Winner: 1986
- Swiss Cup:
  - Winner (2): 1976–77, 1986–87
