= Dieter Schwemmle =

German footballer (born 1949)

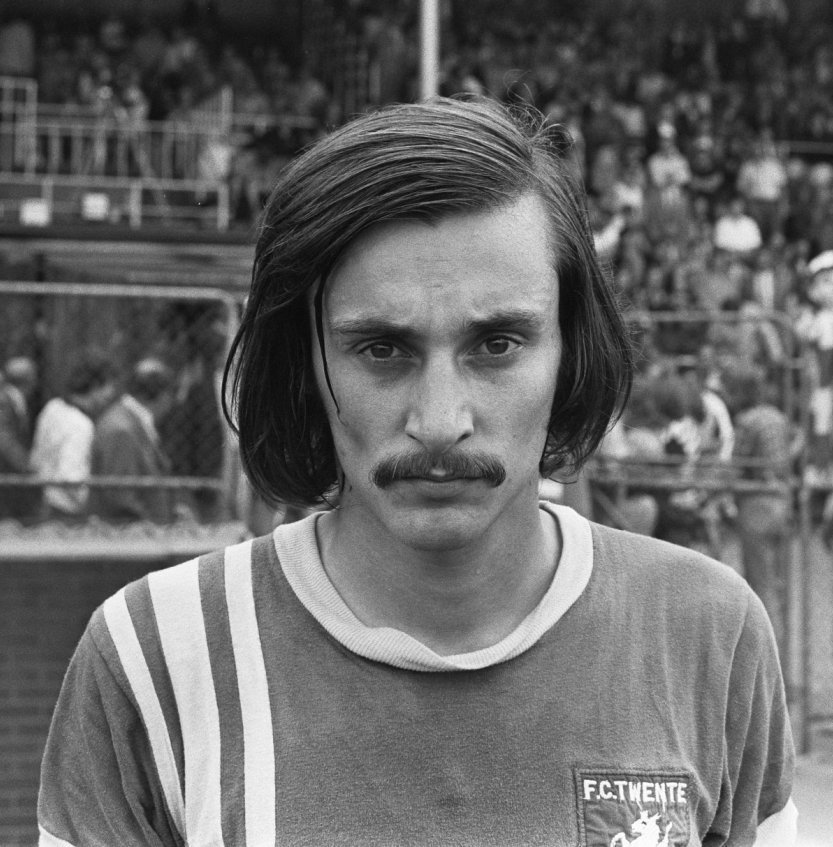
- Schwemmle in 1973

Personal information
- Full name: Dieter Schwemmle
- Date of birth: 28 July 1949 (age 77)
- Place of birth: Stuttgart, West Germany
- Position: Forward

Senior career*
| Years | Team | Apps | (Gls) |
| –1972 | VfB Stuttgart II | | |
| 1972–1973 | VfB Stuttgart | 33 | (6) |
| 1973–1974 | FC Twente | 31 | (6) |
| 1974–1975 | Kickers Offenbach | 31 | (7) |
| 1975–1976 | FC Biel-Bienne | 18 | (9) |
| 1976–1977 | AC Bellinzona | 26 | (8) |
| 1977–1978 | VfL Bochum | 15 | (0) |
| 1978–1979 | FC Hanau 93 | 27 | (11) |
| 1979–1981 | ESV Ingolstadt | 58 | (11) |
| 1981–1982 | Bulova SA | 14 | (3) |
- * Club domestic league appearances and goals

Dieter Schwemmle (born 28 July 1949) is a German former footballer who played as a forward.

== Career ==
=== Statistics ===
| Club performance | | | League | | Cup | | League Cup | | Continental | | Total | |
| Season | Club | League | Apps | Goals | Apps | Goals | Apps | Goals | Apps | Goals | Apps | Goals |
| West Germany | | | League | | DFB-Pokal | | DFB-Ligapokal | | Europe | | Total | |
|---|---|---|---|---|---|---|---|---|---|---|---|---|
| 1971–72 | VfB Stuttgart II | Amateurliga Nordwürttemberg | | | — | | — | | — | | | |
| 1972–73 | VfB Stuttgart | Bundesliga | 33 | 6 | 4 | 2 | 3 | 0 | — | | 40 | 8 |
| Netherlands | | | League | | KNVB Cup | | League Cup | | Europe | | Total | |
| 1973–74 | FC Twente | Eredivisie | 31 | 6 | 2 | 0 | — | | 5 | 0 | 38 | 6 |
| West Germany | | | League | | DFB-Pokal | | DFB-Ligapokal | | Europe | | Total | |
| 1974–75 | Kickers Offenbach | Bundesliga | 31 | 7 | 1 | 0 | — | | — | | 32 | 7 |
| Switzerland | | | League | | Swiss Cup | | League Cup | | Europe | | Total | |
| 1975–76 | FC Biel-Bienne | Nationalliga A | 18 | 9 | | | — | | — | | | |
| 1976–77 | AC Bellinzona | Nationalliga A | 26 | 8 | | | — | | — | | | |
| West Germany | | | League | | DFB-Pokal | | DFB-Ligapokal | | Europe | | Total | |
| 1977–78 | VfL Bochum | Bundesliga | 15 | 0 | 3 | 3 | — | | — | | 18 | 3 |
| 1978–79 | FC Hanau 93 | 2. Bundesliga | 27 | 11 | 0 | 0 | — | | — | | 27 | 11 |
| 1979–80 | ESV Ingolstadt | 2. Bundesliga | 25 | 4 | 1 | 0 | — | | — | | 26 | 4 |
| 1980–81 | ESV Ingolstadt | 2. Bundesliga | 33 | 7 | 2 | 0 | — | | — | | 35 | 7 |
| Hong Kong | | | League | | FA Cup | | League Cup | | Asia | | Total | |
| 1981–82 | Bulova SA | First Division | | | | | — | | — | | | |
| Total | West Germany | | | | 11 | 5 | 3 | 0 | 0 | 0 | | |
| Total | Netherlands | | 31 | 6 | 2 | 0 | 0 | 0 | 5 | 0 | 38 | 6 |
| Total | Switzerland | | 44 | 17 | | | 0 | 0 | 0 | 0 | | |
| Total | Hong Kong | | | | | | 0 | 0 | 0 | 0 | | |
| Career total | | | | | | | 3 | 0 | 5 | 0 | | |
