= Günther Pospischil =

Austrian footballer (born 1952)

Personal information
- Date of birth: 21 May 1952 (age 74)
- Place of birth: Vienna, Austria
- Height: 1.78 m (5 ft 10 in)
- Position: Midfielder

Senior career*
Years	Team	Apps	(Gls)
1974–1975	SC Tulln		
1975–1981	Austria Wien	162	(3)
1981–1982	First Vienna FC	11	(0)

International career
1979–1980	Austria	5	(0)
- * Club domestic league appearances and goals

Günther Pospischil (born 21 May 1952) is an Austrian former footballer who played as a midfielder. He made five appearances for the Austria national team from 1979 to 1980.
