= Hans-Joachim Weller =

German footballer

Personal information
- Date of birth: 2 July 1946 (age 80)
- Place of birth: Kiel, Germany
- Height: 1.74 m (5 ft 9 in)
- Position: Midfielder

Senior career*
Years	Team	Apps	(Gls)
1964–1966	Holstein Kiel II		
1966–1968	Holstein Kiel		
1968–1970	SC Göttingen 05		
1970–1972	Hannover 96		
1972–1974	1860 Munich		
1974–1976	VfB Stuttgart		
1976–1977	FC Zürich		
1977–1978	FC Young Fellows Zürich		
1978–1979	Neuchâtel Xamax		
1979–1980	FC Winterthur		

Managerial career
- 1992–1995: FC Wohlen
- 2003: FC Winterthur
- 2005: FC Vaduz
- 2007: FC Vaduz
- * Club domestic league appearances and goals

Hans-Joachim Weller (born 2 July 1946) is a German former football player and manager who played as a midfielder. Besides Germany, he has played in Switzerland.
