= Josef Pešice =

Czech footballer and manager

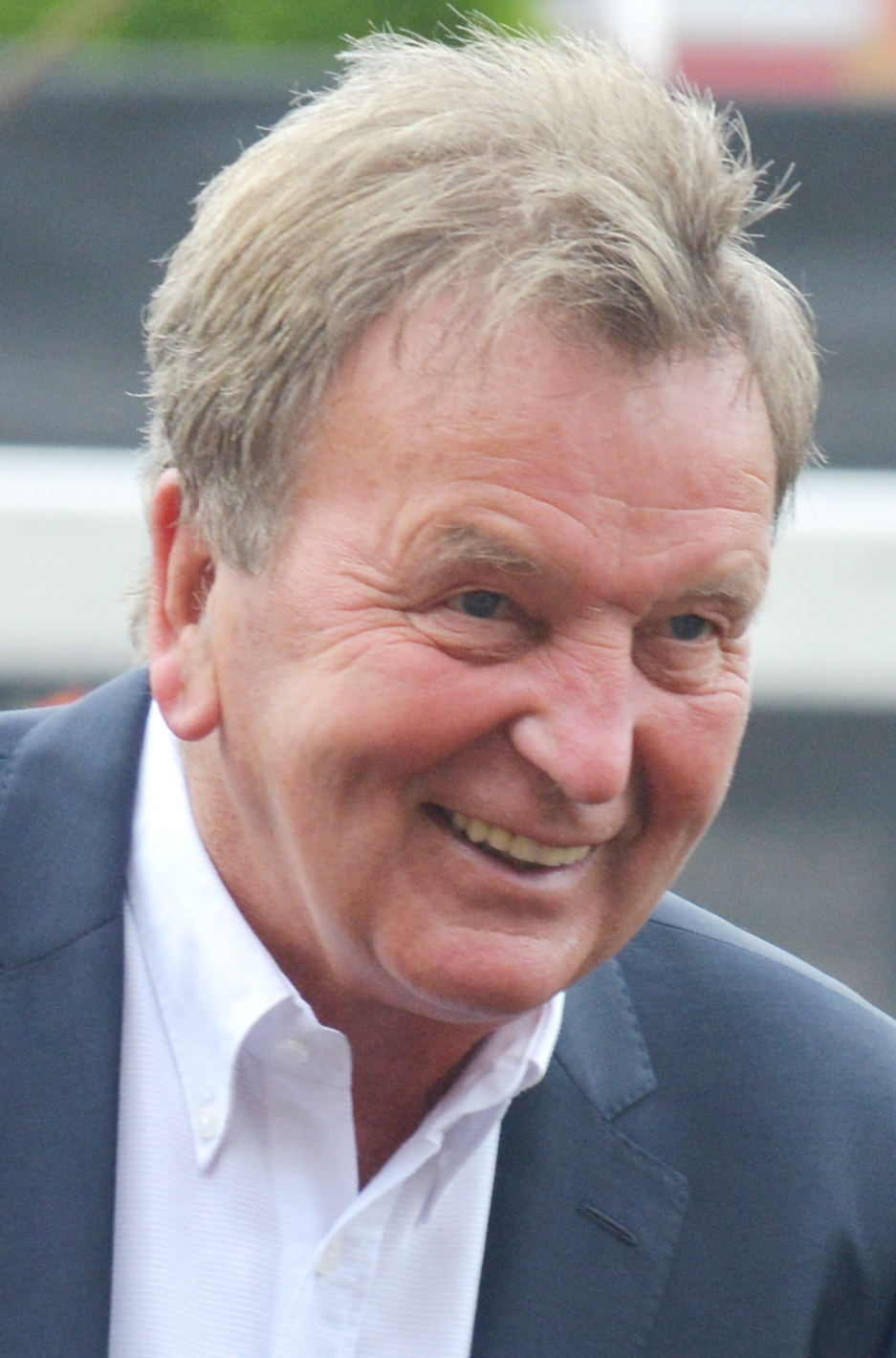

Personal information
- Date of birth: 12 February 1950
- Place of birth: Prague, Czechoslovakia
- Date of death: 18 December 2017 (aged 67)
- Position: Midfielder

Youth career
- 1957–1965: TJ Štěchovice
- 1965–1969: Sparta Prague

Senior career*
Years	Team	Apps	(Gls)
1969–1971	Dukla Tábor		
1971–1975	Sparta Prague	62	(11)
1975–1978	Zbrojovka Brno	92	(15)
1979–1984	Slavia Prague	148	(29)
1984–1986	AEL Limassol		

Managerial career
- 1987–1991: Sparta Prague (youth)
- 1991–1993: Slavia Prague (assistant)
- 1993–1995: FK Jablonec
- 1995–1997: Slavia Prague (assistant)
- 1997–2000: FK Teplice
- 2001: CS Cartaginés
- 2001: Slavia Prague
- 2002: Sparta Prague (assistant)
- 2003–2004: Czech Republic U-18
- 2004–2005: Czech Republic U-19
- 2006–2007: Czech Republic U-16
- 2007–2010: Czech Republic U-17
- 2010: AEL Limassol (assistant)
- 2012–2013: Czech Republic (assistant)
- 2013: Czech Republic
- * Club domestic league appearances and goals

Josef Pešice (12 February 1950 – 18 December 2017) was a Czech football player and manager.

As a player, Pešice played for both famous Prague clubs, Sparta Prague and Slavia Prague. His greatest success however came with Zbrojovka Brno, when he won the Czechoslovak First League with this team in the 1977–78 season.

As a manager, Pešice led several Czech clubs before focusing on Czech Republic youth national teams. He was named the temporary head coach of the Czech Republic in September 2013 and won three out of three games (2 competitive and 1 friendly).
