= Franco Cucinotta =

Italian footballer

Personal information
- Date of birth: 22 June 1952 (age 74)
- Place of birth: Novara di Sicilia, Italy
- Height: 1.71 m (5 ft 7 in)
- Position: Forward

Senior career*
Years	Team	Apps	(Gls)
1970–1974	Lausanne-Sport		
1974–1976	FC Sion		
1976–1978	FC Zürich		
1978–1979	Chiasso		
1979–1981	Servette		
1981–1983	FC Sion		
Total		?	(?)
- * Club domestic league appearances and goals

Franco Cucinotta (born 22 June 1952) is an Italian former professional footballer who played as a striker. He spent his entire career in the Swiss Super League, and during the 1976–77 season, he was the top scorer in both the Swiss League, and the European Cup with FC Zürich.

== Club career ==
Born in Novara di Sicilia, Franco Cucinotta grew up in Montreux, Switzerland, the city to which his family had emigrated for work in 1960. He also later began his professional footballing career in Switzerland, and despite being Italian, is one of the few Italian footballers to have never once played in Italy, spending his entire career in the Swiss League.

While playing for Swiss club FC Zürich (1976–78), Cucinotta was the top scorer of the 1977 European Cup alongside Gerd Müller, scoring a total of five goals in the competition, in which he helped Zürich to reach the semi-finals. He also finished the 1976–77 season as top scorer in the Nationalliga A, with 21 goals, scoring a total of 28 goals in all competitions, which earned him nominations for the Swiss Footballer of the Year and the Swiss Foreign Footballer of the Year Awards.

Cucinotta also played in Switzerland for Lausanne-Sport (1970–74), FC Sion (1974–76; 1981–83), winning the Swiss Cup in 1982, Chiasso (1978–79), and Servette (1979–1981), winning the Swiss League Cup in 1980, and retiring in 1985.

== International career ==
Despite spending his entire club career in Switzerland, Cucinotta retained his Italian citizenship in order to keep his eligibility for the Italian national team.

== After retirement ==
After retiring, Cucinotta worked in insurance, and, after his divorce in 1988, also later moved to Africa for work, where he remained until 2007. He later returned to Switzerland, where he pursued a career in finance.

== Style of play ==
Cucinotta was a very fast centre-forward, with a keen eye for goal, who was also capable of playing as a winger. Due to his abilities, he was compared to fellow Sicilian footballer Pietro Anastasi.

== Honours ==
Servette

- Swiss League Cup: 1979–80

Sion

- Swiss Cup: 1981–82

Individual

- Swiss-League top scorer: 1976–77 (21 goals)
- European Cup top-scorer: 1976–77 (5 goals)
