= Marcel Cornioley =

Swiss footballer (born 1950)

Personal information
- Date of birth: 14 February 1950 (age 76)
- Place of birth: Zürich, Switzerland
- Positions: Midfielder; forward

International career
Years	Team	Apps	(Gls)
- Switzerland

Marcel Cornioley (born 14 February 1950) is a retired Swiss footballer who played as a midfielder for FC Lausanne-Sport.
