= Köbi Kuhn =

Swiss footballer and manager (1943–2019)

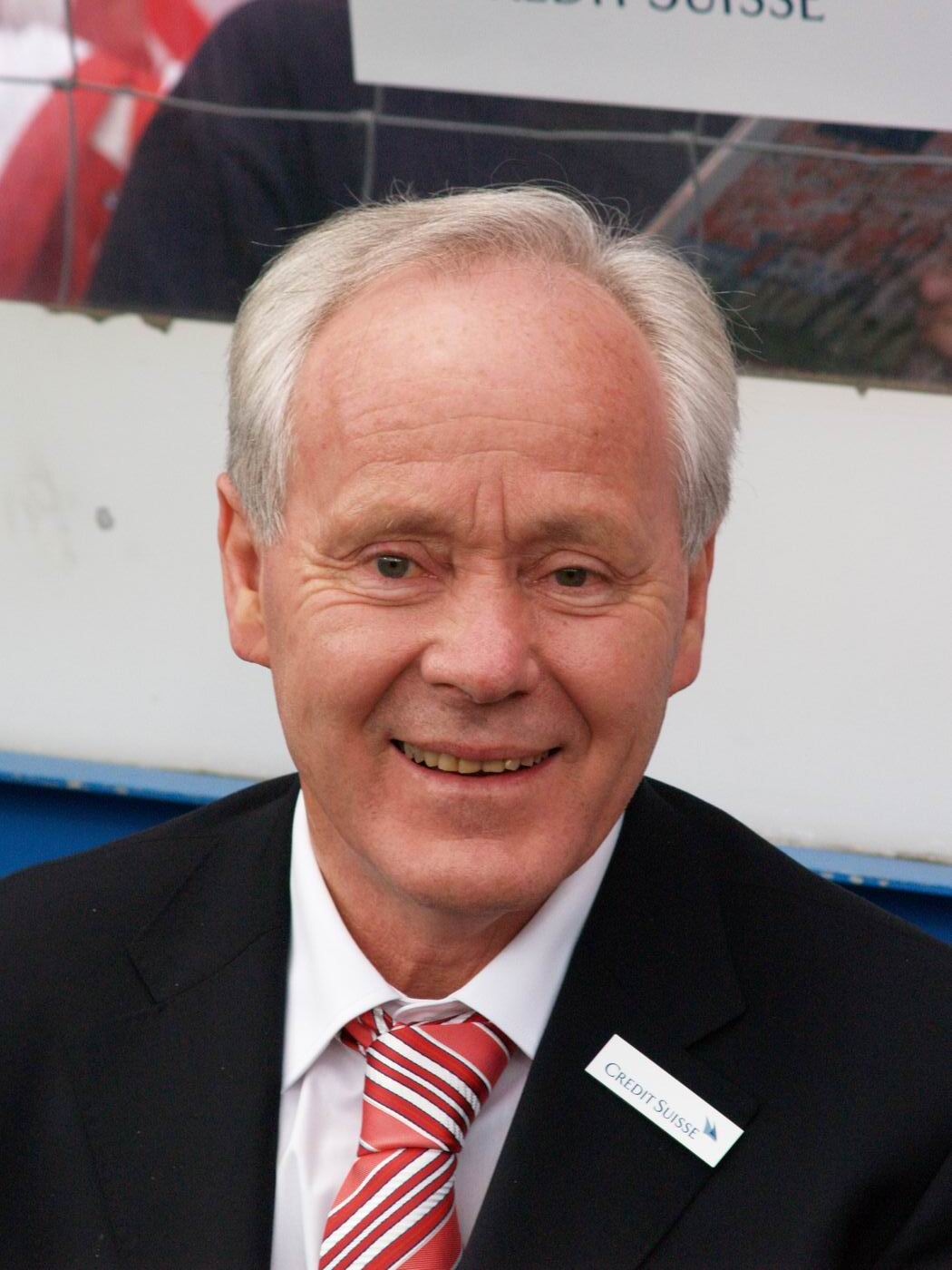
- Kuhn, c. 2006

Personal information
- Full name: Jakob Kuhn
- Date of birth: 12 October 1943
- Place of birth: Zürich, Switzerland
- Date of death: 26 November 2019 (aged 76)
- Place of death: Zollikerberg, Switzerland
- Position: Midfielder

Senior career*
Years	Team	Apps	(Gls)
1961–1977	Zürich	398	(79)

International career
1962–1976	Switzerland	63	(5)

Managerial career
- 1983: Zürich (caretaker)
- 1983–1984: Zürich (caretaker)
- 1995–2001: Switzerland U21
- 2001–2008: Switzerland
- * Club domestic league appearances and goals

Jakob "Köbi" Kuhn (12 October 1943 – 26 November 2019) was a Swiss football player and manager.

During his playing career he played primarily for FC Zürich and won 63 caps for Switzerland, one of which was at the 1966 FIFA World Cup in England. As a manager, he led his national team to Euro 2004 and 2008 and the 2006 World Cup.

== Early life ==
Kuhn was born to a family of seven children, and as a child, he watched matches in the stands of Letzigrund and Hardturm, the stadiums of Zürich clubs FC Zürich and Grasshoppers Club Zürich, with his father, who was a carpenter. He idolized Real Madrid striker Ferenc Puskás.

== Playing career ==
Kuhn stayed 16 years with FC Zürich, captaining them to the Swiss Super League six times, as well as the Swiss Cup five times. He also played for Zürich in European Cup semi-finals in 1963 and 1977. Internationally he won 63 caps, and as a 22-year-old played one game at the 1966 World Cup, before being sent home in disgrace, and later banned for 12 months from the national team, for breaking a curfew.

== Style of play ==
Kuhn is considered one of Switzerland and FC Zürich's greatest players of all time. Possessing good close control and a reading of the game which allowed him to start attacks and create chances for his teammates, Kuhn served as a creative force for Zürich and the Swiss national team from the 60s to the 70s. In the 1975-76 title-winning season, coach Friedhelm Konietzka put Kuhn in the sweeper role, where he could start attacks from deep. Kuhn was also recognized for his tenacity and leadership.

== Managerial career ==
After retiring as a player, Kuhn returned to FC Zürich in 1979 to take charge of their youth set-up. He was later caretaker manager of the club for two short spells between May 1983 and July 1984, as the club searched for a permanent successor to Daniel Jeandupeux. In 1995, he left the club and took a youth-coaching position at the Swiss FA. He led the national under-18 side to an impressive showing at the 1997 European Championships, and later guided the U21s towards qualification for the finals of their respective European Championships for the first time.

Kuhn was promoted to coach of the senior national team in June 2001, replacing the Argentine Enzo Trossero. Kuhn had been approached to become Trossero's assistant, but turned down the offer. With no real senior coaching experience, his appointment as head coach was first not universally applauded, but he has led the Swiss to Euro 2004 and the second round of the 2006 World Cup. Since Kuhn took part in the 1966 World Cup as a player, Switzerland had qualified for just one World Cup, in 1994, and one Euro finals, in 1996. Kuhn spent seven years as coach of the national team, and utilised many of the youth players he had worked with at youth level, ultimately helped building a successful football generation that would be later inherited by Ottmar Hitzfeld. He is second in all-time matches coached for the Swiss team, behind Karl Rappan.

=== Euro 2004 and World Cup 2006 ===
After out-qualifying Russia and the Republic of Ireland to reach Euro 2004, the Swiss team drew 0–0 with Croatia in their opening game of the finals, before defeats to England and France saw them finish bottom of their group. In the game against holders France, Johan Vonlanthen scored Switzerland's equalising goal before Thierry Henry's two late goals. Vonlanthen's goal was not only his team's only goal of the tournament, but also made him the tournament's youngest ever scorer.

On their way to the 2006 World Cup in Germany, the Swiss team were undefeated in qualification Group 4. A bad-tempered play-off against Turkey followed, which saw the Swiss progress on away goals. At the World Cup finals, the Swiss defence again shone, as they topped their group which included France, Togo and South Korea. In the second round, the team were eliminated on penalties after a 0–0 draw with Ukraine. The team suffered the rare feat of getting knocked out without conceding a goal.

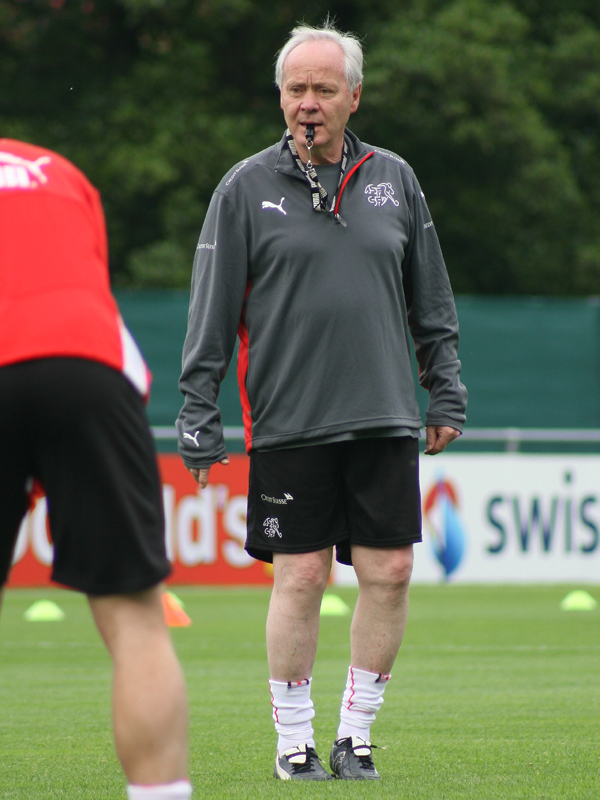
Kuhn supervises training for Euro 2008.

=== Euro 2008 ===
Kuhn announced in October 2006 that he would terminate his engagement as manager of the Swiss squad after Euro 2008. In the week leading up to the tournament, Kuhn's preparations were disrupted by an epileptic attack hospitalising his wife.

In the opening game the Czech Republic eventually managed to break down the Swiss co-hosts' resistance to win 1–0. During the game, Switzerland hit the bar and had captain Alexander Frei limp out of the tournament. In their second match, against Turkey, Switzerland wasted several good chances in a torrential downpour before succumbing to a late, deflected winner, making the score 2–1. Prior to the game, Kuhn had been told that his wife had been woken from her nine-day induced coma. Kuhn told the Tages-Anzeiger newspaper, "I had two feelings inside me on Wednesday, one of huge disappointment because we had gone out of the tournament and a great joy because of the surprise news from the hospital."

Already-qualified Portugal provided the opposition for Kuhn's final match, which saw Portugal make eight changes to their team. Switzerland won 2–0 with both goals from Hakan Yakin. After the game, the Switzerland players unfurled a banner reading Merci Köbi (Thanks Köbi) as a mark of gratitude for his work. Kuhn had stated earlier that it was the aim of the Switzerland squad to win the tournament at home. He was succeeded by Ottmar Hitzfeld the Bayern Munich head coach.

== Managerial statistics ==
Team	Nat	From	To	Record							
Team	Nat	From	To	G	W	D	L	Win %	GF	GA	+/-
Zürich (caretaker)	(Switzerland)	August 1983	August 1983								
Zürich (caretaker)	(Switzerland)	December 1983	May 1984								
Switzerland U21	(Switzerland)	1995	2001								
Switzerland	(Switzerland)	2001	July 2008	73	32	18	23	43.84	111	88	23
Total											

== Personal life ==
After his career as a professional footballer, Kuhn tried his hand at politics, running for the city and cantonal parliaments of Zürich as a member of the Swiss People's Party. In 1987, bankruptcy liabilities were started against Kuhn (who also worked at an insurance company in Altstetten aside from his footballing career), who owed one million Swiss francs to his insurance company and banks.

Kuhn married his wife Alice in 1965, and they remained married until her death in 2014 from a stroke. A Roman Catholic, she converted to Kuhn's Reformed faith. Their only child Viviane passed away in 2018, having a history of drug and alcohol addiction. Kuhn remarried in 2017 to Jadwiga Cervoni.

Kuhn passed away in 26 November 2019 after a long illness. Several Swiss footballing figures paid tribute to Kuhn, with Benjamin Huggel recalling that Kuhn treated his players at the national team as family.

A public memorial was held for Kuhn in 13 December 2019, with ex-FIFA president Sepp Blatter, Basel and Switzerland international Karl Odermatt, Swiss national team coach Vladimir Petković, Zürich mayor Corine Mauch and ex-Swiss Federal Council member and ex-President of Switzerland Samuel Schmid among the mourners. Former international players Alex Frei and Ludovic Magnin delivered speeches at the ceremony.
