= Karl Grob =

Swiss footballer (1946–2019)

Personal information
- Full name: Karl Grob
- Date of birth: 30 May 1946
- Place of birth: Küsnacht, Switzerland
- Date of death: 20 April 2019 (aged 72)
- Place of death: Zürich, Switzerland
- Height: 1.73 m (5 ft 8 in)
- Position: Goalkeeper

Youth career
- 1965–1967: FC Küsnacht
- 1967: Zürich

Senior career*
| Years | Team | Apps | (Gls) |
| 1967–1987 | Zürich | 513 | (0) |
| 1987–1988 | Biel-Bienne | 31 | (0) |

International career^{‡}
| 1967–1976 | Switzerland | 7 | (0) |
- * Club domestic league appearances and goals as of 5 August 2017 ‡ National team caps and goals as of 5 August 2017

Karl Grob (30 May 1946 – 20 April 2019) was a Swiss professional footballer who played as a goalkeeper. Grob is considered to be a legend for Zürich, as he was there for 20 years and helped the team win a total of five Swiss Super Leagues and four Swiss Cups.

== Professional career ==
Grob was a left-winger with FC Küsnacht before switching to a goalkeeper. Grob is the record holder for FC Zürich in appearances in the Swiss Super League, in European tournament, and in total appearances.

== International career ==
Grob made seven appearances for the Switzerland national football team, the first in a 4–0 Euro 1968 qualification loss to Italy on 23 December 1967.

== Death ==
Grob died of heart failure on 20 April 2019 in Zürich, at the age of 72.

== Honours ==
Zürich

- Swiss Super League: 1967–1968, 1973–1974, 1974–1975, 1975–1976, 1980–1981
- Swiss Cup: 1969–1970, 1971–1972, 1972–1973, 1975–1976
