= Peter Risi =

Swiss footballer (1950–2010)

Personal information
- Date of birth: 16 May 1950
- Place of birth: Buochs, Switzerland
- Date of death: 11 December 2010 (aged 60)
- Place of death: Switzerland
- Height: 1.74 m (5 ft 9 in)
- Position: Striker

Senior career*
Years	Team	Apps	(Gls)
1968–1970	SC Buochs		
1970–1972	FC La Chaux-de-Fonds	48	(24)
1972–1974	FC Winterthur	75	(45)
1974–1979	FC Zürich	108	(76)
1979–1984	FC Luzern	128	(72)
1984–1987	SC Buochs		
Total		359	(217)

International career
1974–1977	Switzerland	15	(3)
- * Club domestic league appearances and goals

Peter Risi (16 May 1950 – 11 December 2010) was a Swiss footballer who played at both professional and international levels as a striker.

== Career ==
Born in Buochs, Risi played club football for FC Winterthur, FC Zürich and FC Luzern, and was top scorer of the Nationalliga A in 1976, 1979, and 1981.

Risi also earned fifteen caps for Switzerland between 1974 and 1977.

== Later life and death ==
Risi died on 11 December 2010 following an illness.
