= Walter Hungerbühler =

Swiss football referee (1930–2012)

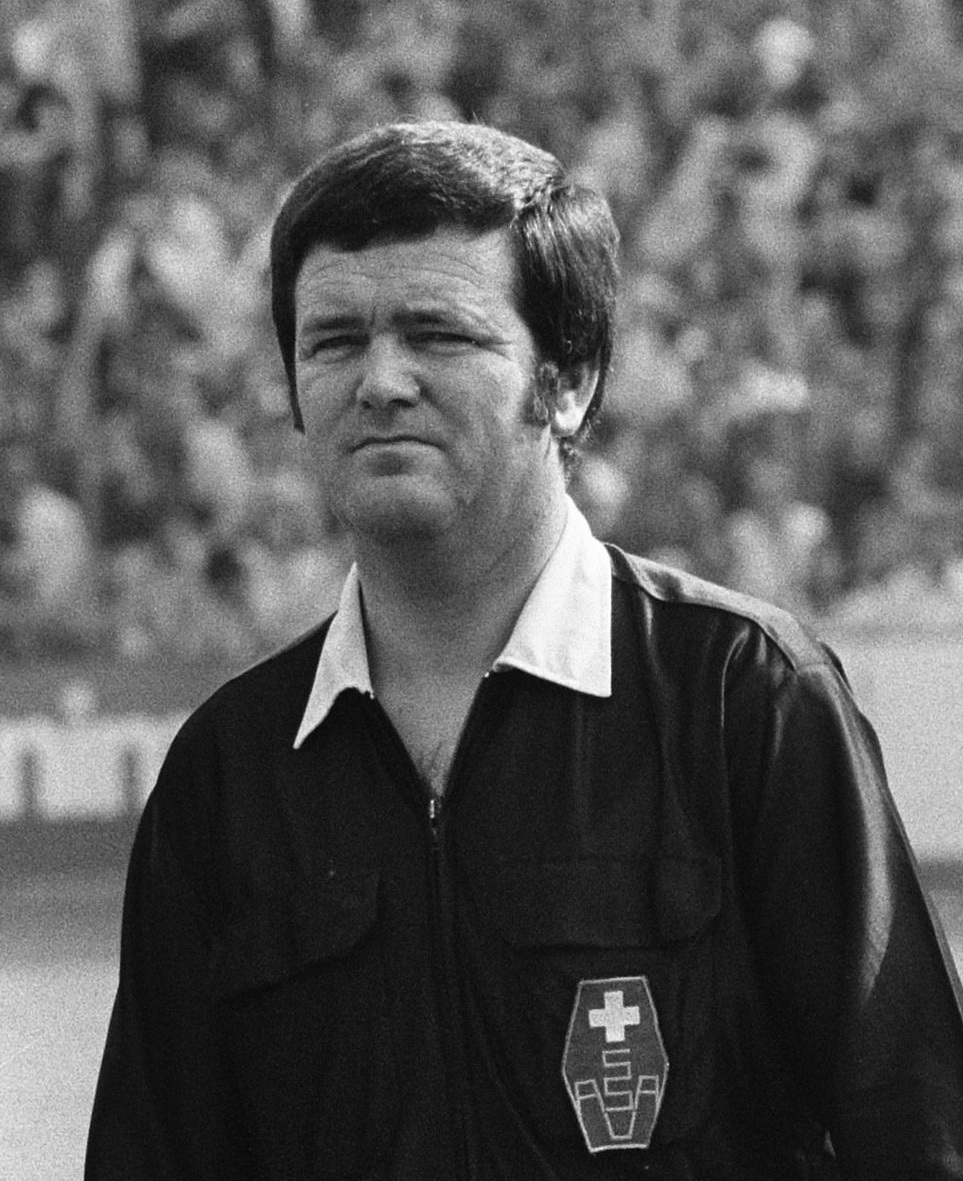
- Hungerbühler in 1975
- Born: 9 August 1930; St. Gallen, Switzerland
- Died: 27 March 2012 (aged 81); St. Gallen, Switzerland

Domestic
| Years | League | Role |
| 1969–1978 | Swiss Super League | Referee |

International
| Years | League | Role |
| 1972–1978 | FIFA listed | Referee |

Walter Hungerbühler (9 August 1930 – 27 March 2012) was a Swiss football referee.

== Refereeing career ==
In 1969, Hungerbühler became a referee in the Swiss Super League, the top flight of football in Switzerland. In 1972, he was appointed as a FIFA referee.

In 1976, Hungerbühler was appointed as a referee for UEFA Euro 1976, where he officiated the third place play-off between the Netherlands and Yugoslavia.

Hungerbühler retired from refereeing in 1978.
