= Pirmin Stierli =

Swiss footballer (born 1947)

Personal information
- Date of birth: 9 October 1947 (age 79)
- Place of birth: Baar, Switzerland
- Height: 1.72 m (5 ft 8 in)
- Position: Defender

Senior career*
Years	Team	Apps	(Gls)
1965–1966	FC Zug		
1966–1969	FC Zürich		
1969–1970	→ RSC Anderlecht (loan)		
1970	Neuchâtel Xamax		
1970–1978	FC Zürich	187	(5)

International career
1968–1974	Switzerland	16	(0)
- * Club domestic league appearances and goals

Pirmin Stierli (born 9 October 1947) is a former Swiss football player. During his career he played for FC Zug, FC Zürich, RSC Anderlecht and Neuchâtel Xamax.

He made 16 appearances for the Switzerland national team between 1968 and 1974.

== Honours ==
=== Club ===
FC Zürich

- Swiss Super League (4): 1967–68, 1973–74, 1974–75, 1975–76
- Swiss Cup (3) 1971–72, 1972–73, 1975–76
