= Pierre-Albert Chapuisat =

Swiss football player/manager (born 1948)

Gabet Chapuisat
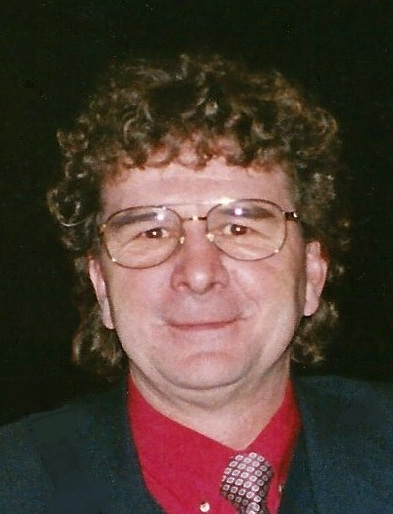

Personal information
- Full name: Pierre-Albert Chapuisat
- Date of birth: 5 April 1948 (age 78)
- Place of birth: Lausanne, Switzerland
- Height: 1.73 m (5 ft 8 in)
- Position: Defender

Senior career*
Years	Team	Apps	(Gls)
1966–1972	Lausanne-Sport		
1972–1973	Paris FC	34	(4)
1973–1976	Lausanne-Sport		
1976–1980	FC Zürich		
1980–1984	Lausanne-Sport	97	(3)
1984–1986	Vevey Sports	34	(1)
1986–1987	Renens		
Total		165	(8)

International career
1969–1979	Switzerland	34	(0)

Managerial career
- 1987–1988: Lausanne-Sport (youth)
- 1988–1990: FC Bulle
- 1990–1992: Montreux Sports
- 1992–1993: Renens
- 1993–1994: Locarno
- 1994–1995: Winterthur
- 1995–1997: Renens
- 1998–2000: Étoile Carouge
- 2000: Epalinges
- 2001–2003: Yverdon-Sport
- 2003–2004: Chênois
- 2005–2006: Lausanne-Sport (assistant)
- 2006: Malley
- 2006–2007: Sion
- 2007–2009: Malley
- * Club domestic league appearances and goals

Pierre-Albert 'Gabet' Chapuisat (French: [pjɛʁ albɛʁ ʃapɥiza]; born 5 April 1948) is a Swiss retired football defender and manager.

== Playing career ==
During his extensive professional career, Lausanne-born Chapuisat played mainly for hometown's FC Lausanne-Sport, having three different spells with the club. In the 1972–73 season he had his first and single abroad experience, representing Paris FC of France, then of Ligue 1.

Chapuisat finished his Lausanne career at 36, then moved to lowly Vevey Sports (helping the side retain its Super League status during his two-year spell), and retired after one season with FC Renens. He was capped 34 times by the Swiss national team, the first game being on 14 May 1969 in a 0–1 home loss against Romania for the 1970 FIFA World Cup qualifiers, in Lausanne.

== Coaching career ==
A manager immediately after his 1987 retirement (starting with his main club's youth teams), Chapuisat coached mainly in the lower leagues of his country. In the 2006–07 campaign, however, he helped FC Sion to the third place in the top division.

== Personal life ==
Chapuisat's son, Stéphane, was also a professional footballer. A forward, he also represented Lausanne, but played mainly in Germany for Borussia Dortmund, appearing 103 times for Switzerland.
