= Deaths in February 2000 =

The following is a list of notable deaths in February 2000.

Entries for each day are listed alphabetically by surname. A typical entry lists information in the following sequence:

- Name, age, country of citizenship at birth, subsequent country of citizenship (if applicable), reason for notability, cause of death (if known), and reference.

== February 2000 ==
=== 1 ===
- Izaäk Boot, 69, Dutch theologian and pastor, lung cancer.
- Pablito Calvo, 51, Spanish actor (Miracle of Marcelino), brain aneurysm.
- Mary Cantwell, 69, American journalist and novelist.
- Pina Cei, 95, Italian actress.
- Frederick Vanderbilt Field, 94, American political activist.
- James Harrell, 81, American actor (The Sugarland Express, Paper Moon, JFK), heart attack.
- Erik Holmberg, 91, Swedish astronomer and cosmologist.
- Art Hoppe, 74, American newspaper columnist, lung cancer.
- Hans Hügi, 73, Swiss football player.
- Khunkar-Pasha Israpilov, 32, Chechen separatist, killed in action.
- Anker Kihle, 82, Norwegian footballer.
- Peter Levi, 68, British poet, jesuit priest and scholar.
- Henry Mann, 94, American professor of mathematics and statistics.
- Thomas J. McHugh, 80, American Sergeant Major of the Marine Corps (1962-1965).
- James V. Neel, 84, American geneticist.
- Dick Rathmann, 74, American racecar driver.

=== 2 ===
- Harry K. Cull, 88, American politician.
- Ben Dickinson, 88, Australian geologist.
- Magda Foy, 94, American child actress.
- Sheikh Abdul Latif, 71, Indian footballer and Olympian (1952, 1956, 1960).
- Jean McDowell, 91, Scottish swimmer and Olympian (1928).
- Teruki Miyamoto, 59, Japanese football player, manager, and Olympian (1964, 1968), heart failure.
- James Riddell, 90, British author, skier, and Olympian (1936).
- Francis Stuart, 97, Irish writer, natural causes.
- Li Zhun, 71, Chinese novelist.

=== 3 ===
- Florența Albu, 65, Romanian poet.
- Guillermo Estévez Boero, 69, Argentine student activist, lawyer and politician, leukemia.
- Bonnie Cashin, 91, American pioneer designer of sportswear, complications from open-heart surgery.
- Don Gallinger, 74, Canadian ice hockey player (Boston Bruins), heart attack.
- William Godwin, 87, British Olympic sports shooter (1960).
- Richard Kleindienst, 76, American politician and U.S. Attorney General during the Watergate scandal, lung cancer.
- John Leovich, 81, American baseball player (Philadelphia Athletics).
- Yuriy Lituyev, 74, Soviet athlete and Olympic medalist (1952, 1956).
- Pierre Plantard, 79, French draughtsman and impostor.
- Alla Rakha, 80, Indian tabla player, heart attack.
- Gérard Rousset, 78, French Olympic fencer (1952).

=== 4 ===
- Carl Albert, 91, American lawyer, politician and Speaker of the United States House of Representatives.
- Victor Ivanovich Alyabyev, 78, Soviet Russian scientist.
- Joachim-Ernst Berendt, 77, German music journalist.
- John M. Bevan, 75, American academic.
- Edgar Bowers, 75, American poet, non-Hodgkin lymphoma.
- Rodrigo Hernan Lloreda Caicedo, 57, Colombian lawyer and politician.
- Joan Capri, 82, Spanish Catalan actor, humorist, and monologuist.
- Syd Cassyd, 91, American executive.
- Doris Coley, 58, American singer of The Shirelles, breast cancer.
- M. R. G. Conzen, 93, German geographer.
- James C. Green, 78, American politician.
- Peter Rajniak, 46, Slovak basketball player and Olympian (1980).
- Ronald Robertson, 62, American figure skater and Olympian (1956), AIDS-related complications.
- Roy Stephenson, 67, English football player.
- Johnny Vincent, 72, American record producer, heart failure.

=== 5 ===
- Claude Autant-Lara, 98, French film director and politician.
- Nick Chickillo, 69, American football player (Chicago Cardinals).
- Ward Cornell, 75, Canadian radio/TV broadcaster & educator, pulmonary emphysema.
- G. E. M. de Ste. Croix, 89, British ancient historian.
- Pablo Elvira, 62, Puerto Rican baritone.
- José García Hernández, 84, Spanish jurist and politician.
- Todd Karns, 79, American actor (It's a Wonderful Life), cancer.
- George Koltanowski, 96, Belgian-American chess master, promoter, and writer, congestive heart failure.
- T. G. Lingappa, 72, Indian film score composer.
- Barbara Pentland, 88, Canadian composer, Alzheimer's disease.
- Hidetoki Takahashi, 83, Japanese football player and manager, pneumonia.
- Tuffy Thompson, 85, American gridiron football player (Pittsburgh Pirates, Green Bay Packers).
- Göran Tunström, 62, Swedish author, lung cancer.
- Gwendolyn Watts, 62, English actress, heart attack.

=== 6 ===
- Derroll Adams, 74, American folk musician.
- Sven Aspling, 87, Swedish social democrat politician.
- Sándor Balogh, 79, Hungarian football player and coach.
- David A. Boehm, 86, American publisher.
- Peter Broadbridge, 3rd Baron Broadbridge, 61, English noble.
- Mike Cowen, 55, South African scholar, heart attack.
- Gus Johnson, 86, American swing drummer.
- Elwyn Morris, 79, Canadian ice hockey player (Toronto Maple Leafs, New York Rangers).
- Bill Riebe, 82, American basketball player.
- Mike Stramiello, 93, American football player (Brooklyn Dodgers, Staten Island Stapletons).
- Klaus Wagner, 89, German mathematician.
- Steve Waller, 48, American musician, liver problems.
- Phil Walters, 83, American racing driver.

=== 7 ===
- Big Pun, 28, American rapper, heart attack.
- Pavle Bulatović, 51, Yugoslav politician, shot.
- Margaret Just Butcher, 86, American educator and civil rights activist.
- Stewart Farrar, 83, English screenwriter, novelist and Wiccan priest.
- Doug Henning, 52, Canadian magician, illusionist and escape artist, cancer.
- Muhammad Munawwar Mirza, 77, Pakistani writer, historian and intellectual.
- Jørgen Boye Nielsen, 74, Danish Olympic field hockey player (1948).
- Shiho Niiyama, 29, Japanese voice actress, leukemia.
- Dave Peverett, 56, English singer and musician of Foghat, kidney cancer.
- Wilfred Cantwell Smith, 83, Canadian Islamicist and Presbyterian minister.
- Mildred Wiley, 98, American high jumper and Olympic medalist (1928).

=== 8 ===
- Sid Abel, 81, Canadian ice hockey player (Detroit Red Wings, Chicago Blackhawks).
- Aryanandi, 92, Indian Jain monk.
- Lionel Bouvrette, 85, Canadian ice hockey player (New York Rangers).
- Paul G. Bulger, 86, American educational official.
- Mario Capio, 75, Italian Olympic sailor (1956, 1960, 1964).
- Gunnar Caspersen, 66-68, Norwegian trade unionist.
- Bob Collins, 57, American broadcaster.
- Carlos Cores, 76, Argentine film actor, and film director, heart attack.
- Beatrice Cori, 56, Italian television presenter and model.
- William Dale, 93, British lawyer and civil servant.
- Ali al-Dandachi, 93-94, Syrian scouting official.
- Coye Dunn, 83, American football player (Washington Redskins).
- Edna Griffin, 90, American civil rights pioneer and activist.
- Sidney Hayers, 78, British film and television director, writer and producer, cancer.
- Ion Gheorghe Maurer, 97, Romanian politician, Prime Minister of Romania (1958-1961).
- Elwin Schlebrowski, 74, German footballer.
- Derrick Thomas, 33, American football player (Kansas City Chiefs) and member of the Pro Football Hall of Fame, pulmonary embolism.

=== 9 ===
- Yevgeni Andreyev, 73, Soviet Air Force colonel and balloonist.
- Georges Bayle, 85, French Olympic wrestler (1936).
- Bruce Bursford, 41, British cyclist, hit by a truck while cycling.
- Rhoda Coghill, 96, Irish pianist, composer and poet.
- Steve Furness, 49, American football player (Pittsburgh Steelers, Detroit Lions), heart attack.
- Beau Jack, 78, American boxer, Parkinson's disease.
- Lenore Kight, 88, American swimmer and Olympian (1932, 1936), Alzheimer's disease.
- Shobhna Samarth, 83, Indian film actress, director and producer, cancer.
- Franz Sterzl, 92, Austrian Olympic decathlete (1936).
- Buck Young, 79, American actor.

=== 10 ===
- Androniqi Zengo Antoniu, 86, Albanian painter.
- Igor Bensen, 82, Russian-American engineer, Parkinson's disease.
- John Garlington, 53, American football player (Cleveland Browns), drowned.
- Elvira Gascón, 88, Spanish painter, drafter, and engraver.
- George Jackson, 42, American movie producer, stroke.
- Gene Lambert, 78, American baseball player (Philadelphia Phillies).
- Blas Monaco, 84, American baseball player (Cleveland Indians).
- Ji Pengfei, 90, Chinese politician, suicide.
- Jim Varney, 50, American actor (Ernest Saves Christmas, Toy Story, The Beverly Hillbillies), lung cancer.
- Andrzej Zakrzewski, 58, Polish historian, politician, and journalist.

=== 11 ===
- Jacqueline Auriol, 82, French aviator who set several world speed records.
- Gordon Lockhart Bennett, 87, Canadian politician, Lieutenant Governor of Prince Edward Island.
- Bernat Capó, 80, Spanish racing cyclist.
- Ruth Volkl Cardoso, 66, Brazilian chess player.
- Robert Gaston, 89, American baseball player.
- Lord Kitchener, 77, Trinidadian calypsonian, multiple myeloma.
- Martin Theodore Orne, 72, Austrian-American professor of psychiatry and psychology, cancer.
- Louis Pelletier, 93, American dramatist, screenwriter, and playwright.
- Elangbam Nilakanta Singh, 72, Indian poet and critic.
- Roger Vadim, 72, French film director, lymphoma.
- Bernardino Zapponi, 72, Italian novelist and screenwriter.

=== 12 ===
- Gordon Aiken, 81, Canadian lawyer and politician.
- Newt Arnold, 77, American film director (Bloodsport), leukemia.
- Dominic Bruce, 84, British Royal Air Force officer and Colditz Castle escapee during World War II.
- George Butterworth, 53, British professor of psychology.
- Emil Cohen, 88-89, American comedian, humorist and entertainer.
- Screamin' Jay Hawkins, 70, American musician, surgical complications.
- Tom Landry, 75, American football coach (Dallas Cowboys) and member of the Pro Football Hall of Fame, leukemia.
- Andy Lewis, 33, Australian bass guitarist, suicide.
- John London, 58, American musician and songwriter.
- August Meuleman, 93, Belgian cyclist and Olympian (1928).
- Oliver, 54, American pop singer.
- Charles M. Schulz, 77, American cartoonist (Peanuts), heart attack.
- Charles Thaon, 89, French Olympic speed skater (1928).
- Juan Carlos Thorry, 91, Argentine film actor, tango musician and director, heart failure.
- Jerome Turner, 57, American district judge (United States District Court for the Western District of Tennessee).
- Rudolf Zöhrer, 88, Austrian footballer.

=== 13 ===
- Anders Aalborg, 85, Canadian politician.
- Ian Allan, 84, Australian politician.
- Klaus Berger, 98, German art historian and professor.
- John Wesley Blassingame, 59, American historian specializing in American slavery.
- James Cooke Brown, 78, American sociologist and science fiction author.
- John Cameron, 85, Jamaican cricket player.
- J. Robert Harris, 74, American composer.
- Olga Jensch-Jordan, 86, German diver and Olympian (1932, 1936).
- F. X. Martin, 77, Irish priest and historian.
- Thelma Parr, 93, American actress.

=== 14 ===
- Tony Bettenhausen, Jr., 48, American car racing driver and team owner, plane crash.
- Tertius Bosch, 33, South African cricketer, Guillain–Barré syndrome.
- Erika Dunkelmann, 86, German film and television actress.
- Jimmy Martin, 75, Irish professional golfer.
- Antun Nalis, 89, Croatian actor.
- Vitamin Smith, 76, American gridiron football player (Los Angeles Rams).
- Arne Winther, 74, Norwegian footballer.
- Walter Zinn, 93, Canadian-American nuclear physicist who worked at the Manhattan Project, stroke.

=== 15 ===
- Dick Aboud, 58, Canadian football player.
- Shamsul Huda Chaudhury, 79, Bangladeshi politician.
- Evgeniy Chuikov, 75, Ukrainian landscape painter.
- John Dennis, 82, American politician.
- Francis FitzRoy Newdegate, 3rd Viscount Daventry, 78, British peer.
- Dilip Dhawan, 45, Indian actor, heart attack.
- Angus MacLean, 85, Canadian politician and farmer.
- Bob Ramazzotti, 83, American baseball player (Brooklyn Dodgers, Chicago Cubs).
- Vladimir Utkin, 76, Soviet and Russian engineer and rocket scientist.

=== 16 ===
- Carl Rudolf Berghult, 94, American politician.
- Wayne Blackburn, 85, American baseball coach.
- Soup Campbell, 84, American baseball player (Cleveland Indians).
- Veronica Cooper, 86, American actress.
- Martin Dain, 75, American photographer and photojournalist.
- Marceline Day, 91, American actress.
- Mohammed Fawzi, 84, Egyptian general and politician.
- Carlos Chagas Filho, 89, Brazilian physician, biologist and scientist.
- Fung Fung, 83, Hong Kong actor.
- Lila Kedrova, 90, Russian-French actress (Zorba the Greek, Torn Curtain, A High Wind in Jamaica), Oscar winner (1965), Alzheimer's disease and pneumonia.
- B. S. Kesavan, 90, Indian librarian.
- Louis-Georges Niels, 80, Belgian bobsledder and Olympic silver medalist (1948).
- Bill Riley, 78, American ice hockey player.
- Karsten Solheim, 88, Norwegian-American golf club designer (PING) and businessman, Parkinson's disease.

=== 17 ===
- Iffat Al-Thunayan, Saudi princess and wife of King Faisal.
- William Anderson, 84, Canadian officer.
- Jot D. Carpenter, 61, American architect.
- Selina Chönz, 89, Swiss children's author.
- Mildred Mottahedeh, 91, American porcelain collector and philanthropist.
- Turkey Tyson, 85, American baseball player (Philadelphia Phillies).
- Miles White, 85, American costume designer of Broadway musicals.

=== 18 ===
- Henry Åkervall, 62, Canadian ice hockey player and Olympian (1964).
- Yalavarthi Naveen Babu, 35, Indian Naxalite leader, killed in firefight with police.
- Ingrid Brainard, 74, American musicologist.
- Lefty Hoerst, 82, American baseball player (Philadelphia Phillies).
- Nader Naderpour, 70, Iranian-American poet, heart attack.
- Will, 72, Belgian comics artist.

=== 19 ===
- Douglas Alexandra, 78, Australian architect, non-Hodgkin lymphoma.
- Walter Bortel, 73, Austrian Olympic cyclist (1952, 1956).
- Electra Carlin, 87, American art dealer and gallery owner. A bequest from her estate established the Electra Carlin Endowment to fund exhibitions of Texas artists at Texas Christian University.
- Marin Goleminov, 91, Bulgarian musician.
- Josef Herman, 89, Polish-British painter.
- Friedensreich Hundertwasser, 71, Austrian artist, heart attack.
- Amanda Ledesma, 88, Argentine film actress and singer.
- George Lenczowski, 85, Russian-American lawyer, diplomat, and academic.
- Kenneth L. Maddy, 65, American politician.
- Djidingar Dono Ngardoum, 72, Chadian politician, Prime Minister (1982).
- George Roussos, 84, American comic book artist (Fantastic Four, Batman, Avengers), heart attack.
- Anatoly Sobchak, 62, Russian politician and mentor of Vladimir Putin and Dmitry Medvedev, heart attack.
- Jim Wulff, 63, American gridiron football player (Washington Redskins).
- Boris Popper, 95, White Russian émigré

=== 20 ===
- Elliot Caplin, 86, American comic strip writer.
- Albert Cleage, 88-89, American writer.
- Jean Dotto, 71, French racing cyclist.
- Jean-Pierre Grenier, 85, French actor, theatre director and screenwriter.
- Bernard Hickman, 88, American basketball player and coach.
- Oswald Lange, 87, German-American aerospace engineer and member of the "von Braun rocket group".
- Otello Martelli, 97, Italian cinematographer (La Dolce Vita, Bitter Rice, La Strada).
- Edmund McNamara, 79, American police officer and gridiron football player (Pittsburgh Steelers).

=== 21 ===
- Noel Annan, Baron Annan, 83, British military intelligence officer and academic.
- Olena Apanovych, 80, Ukrainian historian.
- Violet Archer, 86, Canadian musician and composer.
- Ron Casey, 48, American journalist.
- Chao Tzee Cheng, 65, Hong Kong-Singaporean forensic pathologist.
- Clifton Daniel, 87, American newspaper managing editor, stroke.
- Antonio Díaz-Miguel, 65, Spanish basketball player and coach, cancer.
- Radhamohan Gadanayak, 88, Indian poet.
- Chandrasena Jayasuriya, 65, Sri Lankan Olympic boxer (1956).
- Constance Cummings John, 82, Sierra Leonean educationist and politician.
- Kenneth Nichols, 92, United States Army officer and civil engineer, respiratory failure.

=== 22 ===
- Bruce Allsopp, 87, British historian and publisher.
- Kenneth N. Browne, 76, American politician, prostate cancer.
- Fernando Buesa, 53, Spanish politician, terrorist attack.
- John Kellogg, 83, American actor, Alzheimer's disease.
- Arkady Khait, 61, Russian writer, satirist and screenwriter, leukemia.
- Ernest Lough, 88, English boy soprano.
- Alexandre Marc, 96, French writer and philosopher.
- Maurine Brown Neuberger, 93, American politician, member of the U.S. Senate (1960-1967).
- Michelle O'Keefe, 18, American college student and aspiring actress, gunshot wounds.
- Raphaël Pujazon, 82, French athlete and Olympian (1948).

=== 23 ===
- Raoul Curiel, 86, French archaeologist, egyptologist and orientalist.
- Lucas DeKoster, 81, American politician.
- Dennis Evans, 69, English football player.
- Albrecht Goes, 91, German writer and theologian.
- Nikolay Gulyayev, 84, Russian football player and football coach.
- Ofra Haza, 42, Israeli singer, AIDS-related pneumonia.
- Poul Kops, 84, Danish Olympic boxer (1936).
- Sir Stanley Matthews, 85, English football player.
- John Nevill, 5th Marquess of Abergavenny, 85, British aristocrat.
- Joseph V. Perry, 69, American actor, diabetes.
- B. Rachaiah, 77, Indian politician.
- Terry Melvin Sims, 58, American murderer, execution by lethal injection.

=== 24 ===
- Betty Lou Beets, 62, American murderer, execution by lethal injection.
- Michael Colvin, 67, British politician.
- Franciszek Kamiński, 97, Polish politician and military commander during World War II.
- Rosalind Keith, 83, American film actress and singer.
- Bernard Opper, 84, American basketball player.
- Béla Szekeres, 62, Hungarian middle distance runner and Olympian (1960).
- Boris Mikhaylovich Zaytsev, 62, Soviet Russian ice hockey player and Olympian (1964).

=== 25 ===
- Hal Borne, 88, American popular song composer.
- Pyotr Breus, 72, Soviet Russian Olympic water polo player (1956).
- Fred Caterson, 80, Australian politician.
- Victoria Climbié, 8, Ivorian girl, hypothermia following prolonged child abuse.
- Elaine Gordon, 69, American politician, non-Hodgkin lymphoma.
- Doris Löve, 82, Swedish botanist.
- Tom McEllistrim, 74, Irish Fianna Fáil politician.
- Sishayi Nxumalo, 64, Swazi politician, traffic collision.
- Kuthiravattam Pappu, 62, Indian actor, cardiac arrest.
- Culley Rikard, 85, American baseball player (Pittsburgh Pirates).
- Aleksandar Živković, 87, Croatian football player.

=== 26 ===
- Md. Alauddin, 75, Bangladeshi politician.
- Casimiro Montenegro Filho, 95, Brazilian Air Force officer.
- Franz Fuchs, 50, Austrian terrorist, suicide by hanging.
- Raosaheb Gogte, 83, Indian industrialist, philanthropist and educationist.
- Bill Holland, 85, American basketball player.
- Louisa Matthíasdóttir, 83, Icelandic-American painter.
- Giovanna of Savoy, 92, Italian princess of the House of Savoy, heart failure.
- George L. Street III, 86, United States Navy submarine commander during World War II and Medal of Honor recipient.

=== 27 ===
- Larry Adams, 63, American jockey.
- Jan Adele, 64, Australian actress and vaudeville entertainer.
- Casimiro Berenguer, 90, Puerto Rican nationalist.
- Frank Brugger, 72, New Zealand businessman.
- Eduardo Copello, 74, Argentine racing driver.
- George Duning, 92, American musician, and film composer, heart disease.
- James Stanley Hey, 90, English physicist and radio astronomer.
- Bernard Mammes, 88, American Olympic cyclist (1932).
- Aubrey Eugene Robinson, Jr., 77, American jurist and judge, heart attack.

=== 28 ===
- Mary Bodne, 93, American hotelier.
- Olgierd Darżynkiewicz, 76, Polish soldier and Olympic sports shooter (1952).
- Kariel Gardosh, 78, Israeli cartoonist and illustrator ("Dosh").
- John N. Irwin, II, 86, American diplomat and attorney.
- Dalsukh Dahyabhai Malvania, 89, Indian scholar, writer and philosopher.
- Jean Vallette d'Osia, 101, French officer and French Resistance member during WWII.
- Janet Reed, 83, American ballerina and ballet mistress, stroke.
- George Siravo, 83, American composer, arranger, and musician.

=== 29 ===
- Abe Bolar, 90, American double bass player.
- Joseph Eldrid Burke, 85, American metallurgist and material scientist.
- Joan Daisey, 59-60, American chemist, cancer.
- Dennis Danell, 38, American musician (Social Distortion), cerebral aneurysm.
- Pierre Dumas, French doctor and drug test pioneer.
- Karen Hoff, 78, Danish sprint canoeist and Olympic champion (1948).
- Hidehiko Matsumoto, 73, Japanese jazz saxophonist and bandleader.
- Nikita Moiseyev, 82, Soviet and Russian mathematician and academic.
- Sardar Muhammad Arif Nakai, 70, Pakistani politician.
- Kayla Rolland, 6, American school shooting victim, shot by a six-year-old classmate.
