= Wrestling at the 1936 Summer Olympics – Men's Greco-Roman bantamweight =

Men's Greco-Roman bantamweight at the Games of the XI Olympiad
- Venue: Deutschlandhalle
- Dates: 6–9 August 1936
- Competitors: 18 from 18 nations

Medalists
1st place, gold medalist(s)		Márton Lőrincz	Hungary
2nd place, silver medalist(s)		Egon Svensson	Sweden
3rd place, bronze medalist(s)		Jakob Brendel	Germany

The men's Greco-Roman bantamweight competition at the 1936 Summer Olympics in Berlin took place from 6 August to 9 August at the Deutschlandhalle. Nations were limited to one competitor. This weight class was limited to wrestlers weighing up to 56kg.

This Greco-Roman wrestling competition continued to use the "bad points" elimination system introduced at the 1928 Summer Olympics, with a slight modification. Each round featured all wrestlers pairing off and wrestling one bout (with one wrestler having a bye if there were an odd number). The loser received 3 points if the loss was by fall or unanimous decision and 2 points if the decision was 2-1 (this was the modification from prior years, where all losses were 3 points). The winner received 1 point if the win was by decision and 0 points if the win was by fall. At the end of each round, any wrestler with at least 5 points was eliminated.

== Schedule ==
Date	Event
6 August 1936	Round 1
7 August 1936	Round 2 Round 3
8 August 1936	Round 4
9 August 1936	Round 5 Final round

== Results ==
=== Round 1 ===
The five wrestlers who won by fall took the lead, with 0 bad points. The four other winners by decision each received 1 point. All of the losers were defeated by either fall or unanimous decision, so each received 3 points.

Bouts

Winner	Nation	Victory Type	Loser	Nation
Väinö Perttunen	Finland	Decision, 3–0	Hüseyin Erkmen	Turkey
Ferdinand Hýža	Czechoslovakia	Decision, 3–0	Jakob Brendel	Germany
Robert Voigt	Denmark	Decision, 3–0	Karlo Toth	Yugoslavia
Iosif Töjär	Romania	Fall	Georges Bayle	France
Dante Bertoli	Italy	Decision, 3–0	Evald Sikk	Estonia
Ali Erfan	Egypt	Fall	Josef Buemberger	Austria
Márton Lőrincz	Hungary	Fall	Franz Christen	Switzerland
Egon Svensson	Sweden	Fall	Ivar Stokke	Norway
Antoni Rokita	Poland	Fall	Alfred Gilles	Belgium

Points

Rank	Wrestler	Nation	Start	Earned	Total
1	Ali Erfan	Egypt	0	0	0
1	Márton Lőrincz	Hungary	0	0	0
1	Antoni Rokita	Poland	0	0	0
1	Egon Svensson	Sweden	0	0	0
1	Iosif Tojar	Romania	0	0	0
6	Dante Bertoli	Italy	0	1	1
6	Ferdinand Hýža	Czechoslovakia	0	1	1
6	Väinö Perttunen	Finland	0	1	1
6	Robert Voigt	Denmark	0	1	1
10	Georges Bayle	France	0	3	3
10	Jakob Brendel	Germany	0	3	3
10	Josef Buemberger	Austria	0	3	3
10	Franz Christen	Switzerland	0	3	3
10	Hüseyin Erkmen	Turkey	0	3	3
10	Alfred Gilles	Belgium	0	3	3
10	Evald Sikk	Estonia	0	3	3
10	Ivar Stokke	Norway	0	3	3
10	Karlo Toth	Yugoslavia	0	3	3

=== Round 2 ===
The lead group of five was cut to two, with Lőrincz and Svensson both winning their second decision by fall to stay at 0 points. Three wrestlers finished the second round with 1 point (one win by fall and one win by decision, in either order). Hýža earned his second point with a second win by decision. Four wrestlers moved to 3 points (win by fall and loss by unanimous decision or fall). Two stayed barely alive with 4 points (win by decision and loss by unanimous decision or fall). Six were eliminated with two losses; of these, Erkmen had the best record with 5 points rather than 6 for the others due to his second loss coming via split decision.

Bouts

Winner	Nation	Victory Type	Loser	Nation
Ferdinand Hýža	Czechoslovakia	Decision, 2–1	Hüseyin Erkmen	Turkey
Jakob Brendel	Germany	Decision, 3–0	Väinö Perttunen	Finland
Robert Voigt	Denmark	Fall	Georges Bayle	France
Iosif Tojar	Romania	Decision, 3–0	Karlo Toth	Yugoslavia
Dante Bertoli	Italy	Fall	Ali Erfan	Egypt
Evald Sikk	Estonia	Fall	Josef Buemberger	Austria
Egon Svensson	Sweden	Fall	Franz Christen	Switzerland
Márton Lőrincz	Hungary	Fall	Alfred Gilles	Belgium
Ivar Stokke	Norway	Fall	Antoni Rokita	Poland

Points

Rank	Wrestler	Nation	Start	Earned	Total
1	Márton Lőrincz	Hungary	0	0	0
1	Egon Svensson	Sweden	0	0	0
3	Dante Bertoli	Italy	1	0	1
3	Iosif Tojar	Romania	0	1	1
3	Robert Voigt	Denmark	1	0	1
6	Ferdinand Hýža	Czechoslovakia	1	1	2
7	Ali Erfan	Egypt	0	3	3
7	Antoni Rokita	Poland	0	3	3
7	Evald Sikk	Estonia	3	0	3
7	Ivar Stokke	Norway	3	0	3
11	Jakob Brendel	Germany	3	1	4
11	Väinö Perttunen	Finland	1	3	4
13	Hüseyin Erkmen	Turkey	3	2	5
14	Georges Bayle	France	3	3	6
14	Josef Buemberger	Austria	3	3	6
14	Franz Christen	Switzerland	3	3	6
14	Alfred Gilles	Belgium	3	3	6
14	Karlo Toth	Yugoslavia	3	3	6

=== Round 3 ===
Svensson finished the round in sole possession of the lead, winning a third bout by fall to stay at 0 points. Lőrincz's third win was his first by decision, moving him to 1 point. Tojar also finished the round with 1 point, winning by fall to stay at that score. Both wrestlers who started with 4 points remained in contention, winning by fall to stay at 4 points. Three other wrestlers joined them, either losing to go from 1 point to 4 or winning by decision to go from 3 points to 4. Of that group, however, Bertoli was injured and could not continue. Three wrestlers received their second loss this round and were eliminated; Hýža was also eliminated with his first loss at 5 points (his two wins were by decision).

Bouts

Winner	Nation	Victory Type	Loser	Nation
Väinö Perttunen	Finland	Fall	Ferdinand Hýža	Czechoslovakia
Jakob Brendel	Germany	Fall	Robert Voigt	Denmark
Iosif Tojar	Romania	Fall	Dante Bertoli	Italy
Evald Sikk	Estonia	Decision, 3–0	Ali Erfan	Egypt
Márton Lőrincz	Hungary	Decision, 3–0	Ivar Stokke	Norway
Egon Svensson	Sweden	Fall	Antoni Rokita	Poland

Points

Rank	Wrestler	Nation	Start	Earned	Total
1	Egon Svensson	Sweden	0	0	0
2	Márton Lőrincz	Hungary	0	1	1
2	Iosif Tojar	Romania	1	0	1
4	Jakob Brendel	Germany	4	0	4
4	Väinö Perttunen	Finland	4	0	4
4	Evald Sikk	Estonia	3	1	4
4	Robert Voigt	Denmark	1	3	4
8	Dante Bertoli	Italy	1	3	4r
9	Ferdinand Hýža	Czechoslovakia	2	3	5
10	Ali Erfan	Egypt	3	3	6
10	Antoni Rokita	Poland	3	3	6
10	Ivar Stokke	Norway	3	3	6

=== Round 4 ===
Bertoli's withdrawal resulted in Svensson having a bye, easily keeping his 0 point record intact. Both men who started the round at 1 point took 3-point losses to move to 4 points. Of the four men who started at 4 points, Brendel and Perttunen avoided elimination by winning by falls. Sikk won, but by decision, earning his fifth point and elimination. Voigt lost and was eliminated at 7 points.

Bouts

Winner	Nation	Victory Type	Loser	Nation
Väinö Perttunen	Finland	Fall	Robert Voigt	Denmark
Jakob Brendel	Germany	Fall	Iosif Tojar	Romania
Evald Sikk	Estonia	Decision, 3–0	Márton Lőrincz	Hungary
Egon Svensson	Sweden	Bye	N/A	N/A

Points

Rank	Wrestler	Nation	Start	Earned	Total
1	Egon Svensson	Sweden	0	0	0
2	Jakob Brendel	Germany	4	0	4
2	Márton Lőrincz	Hungary	1	3	4
2	Väinö Perttunen	Finland	4	0	4
2	Iosif Tojar	Romania	1	3	4
6	Evald Sikk	Estonia	4	1	5
7	Robert Voigt	Denmark	4	3	7

=== Round 5 ===
The fifth round eliminated 3 out of the 5 remaining wrestlers, one of whom was safe by reason of having a bye. Brendel gave Svensson the latter man's first loss (and indeed, first points of any kind), but the former was the one eliminated after picking up a fifth point due to the win by decision. Perttunen beat Tojar, but both men needed a win by fall to stay in competition and the bout was resolved by split decision—eliminating both men. Brendel's win over Perttunen back in the second round was the tie-breaker that gave the German the bronze medal.

Bouts

Winner	Nation	Victory Type	Loser	Nation
Jakob Brendel	Germany	Decision, 3–0	Egon Svensson	Sweden
Väinö Perttunen	Finland	Decision, 2–1	Iosif Tojar	Romania
Márton Lőrincz	Hungary	Bye	N/A	N/A

Points

Rank	Wrestler	Nation	Start	Earned	Total
1	Egon Svensson	Sweden	0	3	3
2	Márton Lőrincz	Hungary	4	0	4
3rd place, bronze medalist(s)	Jakob Brendel	Germany	4	1	5
4	Väinö Perttunen	Finland	4	1	5
5	Iosif Tojar	Romania	4	2	6

=== Round 6 ===
Svensson, the man who led the group through four rounds with a flawless record took his second consecutive loss in the sixth and final round to finish with the silver medal. Lőrincz ended with a 4–1 record and the gold medal.

Bouts

Winner	Nation	Victory Type	Loser	Nation
Márton Lőrincz	Hungary	Decision, 3–0	Egon Svensson	Sweden

Points

Rank	Wrestler	Nation	Start	Earned	Total
1st place, gold medalist(s)	Márton Lőrincz	Hungary	4	1	5
2nd place, silver medalist(s)	Egon Svensson	Sweden	3	3	6
