= 1978–79 FC Basel season =

FC Basel
1978–79 season
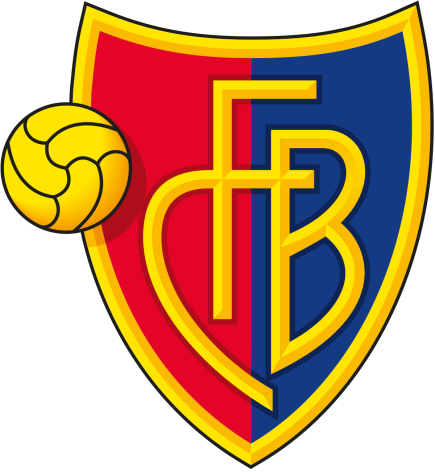
- Chairman: René Theler
- Manager: Helmut Benthaus
- Ground: St. Jakob Stadium, Basel
- Nationalliga A: Qualifying phase 4th of 12
- Championship 6th of 6
- Swiss Cup: Quarter-final
- Swiss League Cup: Runners-up
- UEFA Cup: Round 1
- Cup of the Alps: Group stage
- Top goalscorer: League: Detlev Lauscher (14); All: Detlev Lauscher (22)
- Highest home attendance: 18,000 on 12 May 1979 vs Zürich
- Lowest home attendance: 3,500 on 31 March 1979 vs Lausanne-Sport
- Average home league attendance: 8,121

The Fussball Club Basel 1893 1978–79 season was their 85th season since the club was founded. It was their 33rd consecutive season in the top flight of Swiss football after they won promotion during the season 1945–46. They played their home games in the St. Jakob Stadium. This was René Theler's third period as chairman of the club.

== Overview ==
=== Pre-season ===
Helmut Benthaus was first team manager for the fourteenth consecutive season. There were only a few changes in the squad. Eigil Nielsen moved on to Luzern. Serge Muhmenthaler was forced to terminate his playing career early due to his injury. Muhmenthaler would return a few years later as referee. From the season 1984–85 as referee in the Swiss Football Association and from 1989 as FIFA-Referee. From 1980 until the end of his career in December 1997 he conducted about 250 Swiss and some 75 international games. Walter Mundschin retired from active football. During his time with Basel from 1965 to 1978, Mundschin played a total of 437 games and scored 67 goals. 230 of these games were in the Nationalliga A, 52 in the Swiss Cup or Swiss League Cup, in the European competitions (European Cup, Cup Winners' Cup, UEFA cup and Cup of the Alps) and 98 were friendly games. He scored 44 goals in the domestic league, five in the cup competitions, four in the European competitions and the other 14 were scored during the test games. Mundschin won the Swiss championship six times, the Swiss Cup twice and the League Cup once.

There were also a few new players in the squad. Robert Baldinger joined from Wettingen, Erwin Meyer joined from SC Emmen and Rolf Schönauer joined from local club SC Binningen. All other mutations were internal between the first team and the reserves.

Benthaus led the team in a total of 59 games in their 1978–79 season. 32 of these games were in the domestic league, three in the Swiss Cup, six in the Swiss League Cup, two in the 1978–79 UEFA Cup, four in the Cup of the Alps and 12 were friendly matches. The team scored a total of 110 goals and conceded 97.

=== Domestic league ===
Basel played in the 1978–79 Nationalliga A. This was contested by the first 10 teams from the previous season and the newly promoted teams Nordstern Basel and Chiasso. After a double round-robin in the qualification phase, the top six teams played in a championship group for the title and the bottom six teams in the relegation group. The teams in these two groups started with the bonus of half the points from the qualifying phase (rounded up). The champions were to qualify for 1979–80 European Cup, the second and third teams to qualify for the 1979–80 UEFA Cup. Basel ended the qualification round in fourth position and finished the Championship Group in sixth position with 18 points. They ended the season 17 points behind championship winners Servette who won all ten matches in the championship stage. Basel scored a total of 54 goals conceding 53 in 32 games. Detlev Lauscher was the team's top goal scorer with 14 league goals.

=== Swiss Cup and League Cup ===
In the first round of the Swiss Cup Basel were drawn against lower-tier FC Glattbrugg, who played the 1978–79 season 1. Liga (third-tier), and this was the first time that these two clubs had ever played against each other. The game was played on 7 October 1978 and Basel won 7–0. In the second round Basel were drawn away and won against Zürich. In the third round Basel were away against Xamax and were knocked out of the competition. In the final on 20 June 1979 in the Wankdorf Stadium in Bern Servette were matched against Young Boys and won the cup winning the game 3–2. The Cup winners were to qualify for the 1979–80 European Cup Winners' Cup, but because Servette became champions the runners-up inherited this slot.

In the first round of the Swiss League Cup Basel were drawn against Grenchen. This was played as a two legged affair, winning the home game and losing away game, Basel advanced 4–3 on aggregate. Basel won in the round of 16 against Nordstern Basel. In the quarter-final they won against Luzern and in the semi-final they won against Xamax to reach the final. The final was played on 5 May 1979 in the Wankdorf Stadium. This was against Servette and after extra time the score was 2–2. In the end Servette won 4–3 on penalties and completed the national treble, Championshup, Cup and League Cup.

=== UEFA Cup and Coppa delle Alpi ===
In the 1978–79 UEFA Cup Basel were drawn against VfB Stuttgart. The first game was lost 2–3 in St. Jakob Stadium and the away game in the Neckarstadion was lost 1–4. VfB Stuttgart won 7–3 on aggregate and continued to the second round.

In the Coppa delle Alpi (to English Cup of the Alps) Basel played with Stade de Reims and Sochaux in Group B together with Lausanne-Sport. Lausanne-Sport won the group and thus advanced to play in the final only to lose this against the winners of group A, Servette FC, 0–4.

== Players ==
Note: Flags indicate national team as defined under FIFA eligibility rules; some limited exceptions apply. Players may hold more than one non-FIFA nationality.

No.	Pos.	Nation	Player
1	GK	SUI	Hans Küng
2	MF	SUI	Walter Geisser
3	FW	SUI	Robert Baldinger (from Wettingen)
4	DF	SUI	Urs Siegenthaler
5	DF	SUI	Paul Fischli
6	MF	SUI	Otto Demarmels
7	FW	SUI	Peter Marti
8	FW	SUI	Markus Tanner
9	FW	SUI	Roland Schönenberger
10	MF	SUI	Arthur von Wartburg
11	MF	GER	Detlev Lauscher

No.	Pos.	Nation	Player
12	MF	SUI	Jean-Pierre Maradan
13	DF	SUI	Rolf Schönauer (from SC Binningen)
14	DF	SUI	Jörg Stohler
15	MF	SUI	Erwin Meyer (from SC Emmen)
16	MF	SUI	Hansruedi Schär
17	MF	SUI	Silvan Corbat (reserves)
18	MF	SUI	Erni Maissen
22	GK	SUI	Hans Müller
—		SUI	Daniel Hagenbuch (reserves)
—	GK	SUI	Felix Wälchli (reserves)
—	GK	SUI	Jürg Wenger

Players who left the squad

Note: Flags indicate national team as defined under FIFA eligibility rules; some limited exceptions apply. Players may hold more than one non-FIFA nationality.

No.	Pos.	Nation	Player
—	DF	SUI	Walter Mundschin (retired)
—	MF	DEN	Eigil Nielsen (to Luzern)

No.	Pos.	Nation	Player
—	MF	SUI	Serge Muhmenthaler (retired)

== Results ==
Legend

Win Draw Loss Postponed

=== Friendly matches ===
==== Pre-season ====
14 July 1978 Pre-season	RC Strasbourg (France)	1–2	(Switzerland) Basel	Haguenau
	65' (1:1)	Summary	2' (0:1) Maissen; 75' (1:2) Stohler	Attendance: 1,000

3 August 1978 Uhrencup semi-final	Basel (Switzerland)	7–0	(Switzerland) Biel-Bienne	Stadion Brühl, Grenchen
20:15	Demarmels 20' (1:0); Lauscher 21' (2:0); Tanner 23' (3:0); Schönenberger 43' (4:0) von Wartburg 48' (5:0); Lauscher 55' (6:0); Tanner 64' (7:0)	Summary		Attendance: 1,000; Referee: (Switzerland) Peter Rotschi (Oensingen)

6 August 1978 Pre-season	Basel (Switzerland)	0–6	(England) Liverpool	St. Jakob Stadium, Basel
19:00		Summary	7' (o.g. 0:1); 20' (0:2) Dalglish; 35' (0:3) Hughes; 45' (0:4) Kennedy; 60' (0:5) Case; 71' (0:6) Kennedy	Attendance: 11,000; Referee: (Switzerland) Otto Isler (Zürich)
Note: Swiss national team manager Roger Vonlanthen and VfB Stuttgart manager Jürgen Sundermann on the stands.

9 August 1978 Uhrencup final	Basel (Switzerland)	2–1	(Switzerland) Xamax	Stadion Brühl, Grenchen
20:15	Stohler 27' (pen. 1:0); Lauscher 44' (2:0)	Summary	66' (2:1) Lüthi	Attendance: 2,300; Referee: (Switzerland) Franz Gächter (Aarau, Suhr, Aargau)

==== Winter break and mid-season ====
19 January 1979 Winter break	Violette AC (Haiti)	2–1	(Switzerland) Basel	Port-au-Prince, Haiti
	70' (1:1); 81' (2:1)	Summary	43' (0:1) Demarmels	Attendance: 9,000

20 January 1979 Winter break	Racing CH (Haiti)	0–1	(Switzerland) Basel	Port-au-Prince, Haiti
		Summary	41' (0:1) Baldinger	Attendance: 6,500

10 February 1979 Winter break	Biel-Bienne (Switzerland)	2–1	(Switzerland) Basel	Gurzelen Stadion, Biel/Bienne
	Ciullo 61' (1:0); Nussbaum 84' (2:1)	Summary	69' (1:1) Lauscher	Attendance: 300; Referee: (Switzerland) Werner Bösch (Sutz-Lattrigen)

14 February 1979 Winter beak	SV Muttenz (Switzerland)	1–4	(Switzerland) Basel	Sportplatz Margelacker, Muttenz
18:30	Harrisberger 68' (1:2)	Summary	15' (0:1) Stohler; 25' (0:2) Marti; (penalty missed) 28′ Stohler; 85' (1:3) Maissen; 86' (1:4) Lauscher	Attendance: 300; Referee: (Switzerland) Martin (Arisdorf)

17 February 1979 Winter break	Luzern (Switzerland)	0–1	(Switzerland) Basel	Luzern
		Summary	39' (0:1) Demarmels	Attendance: 300; Referee: (Switzerland) Gottlieb Barmettler (Luzern)

21 February 1979 Winter break	Aarau (Switzerland)	3–2	(Switzerland) Basel	Stadion Brügglifeld, Aarau
19:15	Hegi 12' (pen. 1:1); Franz 35' (2:1); Franz 67' (3:2)	Summary	1' (0:1) Marti; 46' (2:2) Demarmels	Attendance: 700; Referee: (Switzerland) Franz Gächter (Aarau, Suhr, Aargau)

27 March 1979 Mid-season	Kriens (Switzerland)	1–3	(Switzerland) Basel	Kriens
	Fischer 40' (1:3)	Summary	12' (0:1) Meyer; 18' (0:2) Marti; 37' (0:3) Marti	Attendance: 250; Referee: (Switzerland) Bruno Burgener (Kriens)

5 June 1979 Mid-season	FC Bern (Switzerland)	3–4	(Switzerland) Basel	Bern
	Jauner 29' (1:1); Rohner 35' (2:2); Getzmann 83' (3:4)	Summary	26' (0:1) Lauscher; 33' (1:2) Schönenberger; 70' (2:3) Maissen; 80' (2:4) Maissen	Attendance: 150; Referee: (Switzerland) Werner Liebi (Thun)

=== Nationalliga ===
==== Qualifying phase matches ====
12 August 1978 Round 1	Chiasso	2–1	Basel	Stadio Comunale, Chiasso
20:30	Bosco 35' (1:1); Cucinotta 45' (2:1)	FCB summary	23' (0:1) Lauscher	Attendance: 5,000; Referee: (Switzerland) Rudolf Renggli (Stans and Luzern)

19 August 1978 Round 2	Basel	2–2	Young Boys	St. Jakob Stadium, Basel
20:00	Corbat 22' (1:0); Stohler 33' (pen. 2:0); Stohler (yellow card) 36'; Maissen (yellow card) 61'	FCB summary	(penalty missed) 14′ Hussner; 39' (2:1) Hussner; 53' (2:2) Zwahlen	Attendance: 8,500; Referee: (Switzerland) Rudolf Affolter
Note: Otto Demarmels was honored for 200 and Jörg Stohler for 150 league appearances with flowers. 14th minute: Küng saved Hussner's penalty.

23 August 1975 Round 3	Nordstern Basel	1–1	Basel	St. Jakob Stadium, Basel
20:00	Degen 2' (pen. 1:0)	FCB summary	35' (1:1) Stohler	Attendance: 13,200; Referee: (Switzerland) Peter Scherz (Aegerten)
Note: Record attendance for Nordstern this season. Half-time concert by the local brass band. Corners: 8:8

26 August 1978 Round 4	Servette	6–0	Basel	Charmilles Stadium, Geneva
20:30	Barberis 4' (1:0); Schnyder 26' (2:0); Schnyder 30' (3:0); Schnyder 66' (4:0); Hanspeter WeberWeber 73' (5:0); Elia 84' (6:0)	FCB summary	(yellow card) von Wartburg	Attendance: 9,500; Referee: (Switzerland) Jakob Baumann (Schaffhausen)

2 September 1978 Round 5	Basel	2–1	Chênois	St. Jakob Stadium, Basel
20:00	Maissen 59' (1:0); Maradan 84' (pen. 2:1)	FCB summary	68' (1:1) Rufli; (yellow card) Yaghcha	Attendance: 4,000; Referee: (Switzerland) Hans Wolfer

9 September 1978 Round 6	Sion	0–0	Basel	Stade Tourbillon, Sion
20:15		FCB summary		Attendance: 2,500; Referee: (Switzerland) Jean-Marie Macheret, (Rueyres-St-Laurent)

16 September 1978 Round 7	Basel	5–2	Xamax	St. Jakob Stadium, Basel
15:00	Schönenberger 1' (1:0); Schönenberger 31' (2:1); Demarmels 48' (3:1); Schönenberger 60' (4:1); Schönenberger 64' (5:1); (yellow card) Maradan	FCB summary	18' (1:1) Rub; 74' (5:2) Hasler; (yellow card) 79' Rub	Attendance: 6,000; Referee: (Switzerland) Gottlieb Barmettler (Luzern)

24 September 1978 Round 8	Zürich	1–1	Basel	Letzigrund, Zürich
14:30	Risi (penalty missed) 17′ Botteron 36' (1:0); Jerković (yellow card) 83'	FCZ sunnary FCB summary	46' (1:1) Marti	Attendance: 14,000; Referee: (Switzerland) Bruno Galler (Kirchdorf, Bern)
Note: 17th minute Hans Küng saved Peter Risi's penalty

30 September 1978 Round 9	Basel	3–2	Grasshopper Club	St. Jakob Stadium, Basel
20:00	Tanner 63' (1:2); Maradan 65' (2:2) von Wartburg 87' (3:2); Fischli (yellow card)	FCB summary	30' (0:1) Sulser; 56' (0:2) Sulser	Attendance: 7,500; Referee: (Switzerland) André Daina (Éclépens)

14 October 1978 Round 10	Lausanne-Sport	0–1	Basel	Olympique de la Pontaise, Lausanne
20:30	Favre (yellow card)	FCB summary	55' (0:1) Lauscher; (yellow card) Schönenberger	Attendance: 15,500; Referee: (Switzerland) Jakob Baumann (Schaffhausen)

22 October 1978 Round 11	Basel	4–2	St. Gallen	St. Jakob Stadium, Basel
15:00	Schär 1' (1:0); Stohler 16' (2:1); Marti 77' (3:2); Maissen 89' (4:2)	FCB summary	13' (1:1) Stomeo; 70' (2:2) Stomeo; (yellow card) Stöckl; (yellow card) Seger	Attendance: 12,500; Referee: (Switzerland) Othmar Winter, (Martigny)

29 October 1978 Round 12	Basel	4–0	Chiasso	St. Jakob Stadium, Basel
15:00	Lauscher 6' (1:0); Tanner 47' (2:0); Schär 49' (3:0); Tanner 54' (4:0)	FCB summary		Attendance: 8,500; Referee: (Switzerland) Rudolf Renggli (Stans and Luzern)
Note: Corners 4:4.

4 November 1978 Round 13	Young Boys	2–0	Basel	Wankdorf Stadium, Bern
17:30	Hussner 41' (1:0); Küttel 88' (2:0); Feuz (yellow card); Küttel (yellow card); Zwahlen (yellow card)	FCB summary	(yellow card) Tanner; (yellow card) von Wartburg	Attendance: 12,200; Referee: (Switzerland) Bruno Galler (Kirchdorf, Bern)

19 November 1978 Round 14	Basel	4–1	Servette	St. Jakob Stadium, Basel
15:00	Stohler 25' (1:0); Lauscher 27' (2:0); Schönenberger 39' (3:0); Lauscher 43' (4:0); Maradan (yellow card)	FCB summary	55' (4:1) Schnyder	Attendance: 15,000; Referee: (Switzerland) Gottlieb Barmettler (Luzern)

25 November 1978 Round 15	Chênois	1–0	Basel	Stade des Trois-Chêne, Thônex
15:45	Lopez 3' (1:0)	FCB summary		Attendance: 3,500; Referee: (Switzerland) Rudolf Renggli (Stans and Luzern)

3 December 1978 Round 16	Basel	2–0	Sion	St. Jakob Stadium, Basel
15:00	Lauscher 14' (1:0); Demarmels (yellow card) 63'; Marti 85' (2:0)	FCB summary		Attendance: 4,000; Referee: (Switzerland) Ernest Guignet (Yverdon-les-Bains)
Note: Corners: 11:5.

4 March 1979 Round 17	Xamax	2–0	Basel	Stade de la Maladière (1924), Neuchâtel
15:00	Gross 39' (1:0); Bianchi 66' (2:0); Weller (yellow card)	FCB summary	(yellow card) Schönenberger	Attendance: 3,500; Referee: (Switzerland) Jakob Baumann (Schaffhausen)

11 March 1979 Round 18	Basel	1–0	Zürich	St. Jakob Stadium, Basel
15:00	Demarmels 5' (1:0); Geisser (yellow card) 44'; Demarmels (yellow card) 65'	FCZ summary FCB summary	(yellow card) 45' Lüdi	Attendance: 10,000; Referee: (Switzerland) André Daina (Éclépens)

17 March 1979 Round 19	Grasshopper Club	2–1	Basel	Hardturm, Zürich
20:00	Ponte 17' (1:0); Hermann 89' (2:1)	FCB summary	52' (pen. 1:1) Stohler	Attendance: 7,500; Referee: (Switzerland) Gottlieb Barmettler (Luzern)

31 March 1979 Round 20	Basel	2–0	Lausanne-Sport	St. Jakob Stadium, Basel
20:00	Lauscher 8' (1:0); Meyer 26' (2:0)	FCB summary		Attendance: 3,500; Referee: (Switzerland) Othmar Winter, (Martigny)

4 April 1979 Round 21	Basel	1–1	Nordstern Basel	St. Jakob Stadium, Basel
20:15	Meyer 9' (1:0); Maradan (yellow card)	FCB summary	80' (1:1) René RietmannRietmann	Attendance: 6,000; Referee: (Switzerland) Peter Rotschi (Oensingen)

7 April 1979 Round 22	St. Gallen	1–1	Basel	Espenmoos, St. Gallen
20:00	Brander 22' (1:0)	FCB summary	89' (1:1) Maissen; (yellow card) Demarmels	Attendance: 9,000; Referee: (Switzerland) Jean-Marie Macheret, (Rueyres-St-Laurent)

==== Qualifying phase table ====
Pos	Team	Pld	W	D	L	GF	GA	GD	Pts	Qualification
1	FC Zürich	22	13	6	3	51	19	+32	32	To championship round
2	Servette FC	22	12	6	4	56	23	+33	30	To championship round
3	Grasshopper Club Zürich	22	9	9	4	35	24	+11	27	To championship round
4	FC Basel	22	10	6	6	36	29	+7	26	To championship round
5	BSC Young Boys	22	11	4	7	39	34	+5	26	To championship round
6	FC St. Gallen	22	11	4	7	34	34	0	26	To championship round
7	Neuchâtel Xamax	22	8	8	6	42	33	+9	24	To relegation play-out round
8	CS Chênois	22	9	4	9	30	32	−2	22	To relegation play-out round
9	Lausanne Sports	22	6	3	13	28	40	−12	15	To relegation play-out round
10	FC Chiasso	22	5	3	14	20	46	−26	13	To relegation play-out round
11	FC Nordstern Basel	22	2	8	12	19	44	−25	12	To relegation play-out round
12	FC Sion	22	3	5	14	20	52	−32	11	To relegation play-out round

Source: rsssf.com
Rules for classification: 1) Points; 2) Goal difference; 3) Goals scored;

==== Championship group matches ====
21 April 1979 Round 1	Basel	6–0	Young Boys	St. Jakob Stadium, Basel
20:00	Lauscher 24' (1:0); Lauscher 36' (2:0); Stohler 44' (3:0); Meyer 57' (4:0); Maradan 62' (5:0); Demarmels 73' (6:0)	FCB summary		Attendance: 11,000; Referee: (Switzerland) Rudolf Renggli (Stans and Luzern)

28 April 1979 Round 2	Grasshopper Club	2–1	Basel	Hardturm, Zürich
20:00	Traber 11' (1:0); Sulser 13' (2:0)	FCB summary	82' (2:1) Lauscher; (yellow card) Fischli; (yellow card) Stohler	Attendance: 12,000; Referee: (Switzerland) André Daina (Éclépens)

8 May 1979 Round 3	Basel	2–0	St. Gallen	St. Jakob Stadium, Basel
20:00	Maissen 87' (1:0); Lauscher 90+1' (2:0)	FCB summary	(yellow card) Schüepp; (yellow card) Fleury	Attendance: 7,000; Referee: (Switzerland) Franz Gächter (Aarau, Suhr, Aargau)

12 May 1979 Round 4	Basel	1–3	Zürich	St. Jakob Stadium, Basel
20:00	Marti 65' (1:1)	FCZ summary FCB summary	3' (0:1) Risi; (yellow card) 25' Lüdi; (yellow card) 53' Zappa; 80' (1:2) Risi; 90' (1:3) Zwicker	Attendance: 18,500; Referee: (Switzerland) Peter Scherz (Aegerten)

17 May 1979 Round 5	Servette	2–0	Basel	Charmilles Stadium, Geneva
20:30	Coutaz 16' (1:0); Peterhans 33' (2:0)	FCB summary		Attendance: 11,500; Referee: (Switzerland) Jakob Baumann (Schaffhausen)

26 May 1979 Round 6	Young Boys	2–2	Basel	Wankdorf Stadium, Bern
20:00	Pelfini 45' (1:2); Odermatt 62' (pen. 2:2)	FCB summary	3' (0:1) Lauscher; 14' (0:2) Schönenberger	Attendance: 7,500; Referee: (Switzerland) Gottlieb Barmettler (Luzern)

31 May 1979 Round 7	Basel	2–3	Grasshopper Club	St. Jakob Stadium, Basel
20:00	Maissen 26' (1:1); Lauscher 31' (2:1)	FCB summary	11' (0:1) Koller; 32' (2:2) Koller; 39' (2:3) Bauer	Attendance: 7,500; Referee: (Switzerland) André Daina (Éclépens)

13 June 1979 Round 8	St. Gallen	4–0	Basel	Espenmoos, St. Gallen
20:00	Stomeo 11' (1:0); Stomeo 33' (2:0); Friberg 55' (3:0); Müller 75' (4:0); Stöckl (yellow card); Labhart (yellow card)	FCB summary	(yellow card) Tanner	Attendance: 5,200; Referee: (Switzerland) Jean-Marie Macheret, (Rueyres-St-Laurent)

16 June 1979 Round 9	Zürich	4–2	Basel	Letzigrund, Zürich
20:00	Botteron 5' (1:0); Baur 26' (2:0); Botteron 38' (3:0); Zwicker 70' (4:0); Scheiwiler (yellow card)	FCZ summary FCB summary	43' (3:1) Baldinger; 46' (3:2) Lauscher; (yellow card) Tanner	Attendance: 4,000; Referee: (Switzerland) Werner Bösch (Sutz-Lattrigen)

23 June 1979 Round 10	Basel	1–4	Servette	St. Jakob Stadium, Basel
20:00	Demarmels 2' (1:0)	FCB summary	8' (1:1) Andrey; 53' (1:2) Barberis; 68' (1:3) Pfister; 61' (1:4) Pfister	Attendance: 4,000; Referee: (Switzerland) Othmar Winter, (Martigny)

==== Championship group table ====
Pos	Team	Pld	W	D	L	GF	GA	GD	BP	Pts	Qualification
1	Servette	10	10	0	0	23	5	+18	15	35	Champions and Swiss Cup winners qualified for 1979–80 European Cup
2	Zürich	10	6	1	3	19	14	+5	16	29	qualified for 1979–80 UEFA Cup and entered 1979 Intertoto Cup
3	Grasshopper Club	10	3	3	4	11	13	−2	14	23	qualified for 1979–80 UEFA Cup and entered 1979 Intertoto Cup
4	St. Gallen	10	2	3	5	8	11	−3	13	20	entered 1978 Intertoto Cup
5	Young Boys	10	1	4	5	5	17	−12	13	19	Cup finalist qualified for 1979–80 European Cup Winners' Cup
6	Basel	10	2	1	7	18	24	−6	13	18	

Source: rsssf.com

=== Swiss Cup ===
8 October 1978 Round 4	FC Glattbrugg	0–7	Basel	Sportanlage Au, Glattbrugg
15:00		FCB summary	32' (0:1) von Wartburg; 36' (0:2) Lauscher; 48' (0:3) Schönenberger; 54' (0:4) Schönenberger; 71' (0:5) Schönenberger; 79' (0:6) Baldinger; 84' (0:7) Baldinger	Attendance: 3,000; Referee: (Switzerland) Franz Gächter (Aarau, Suhr, Aargau)

10 December 1978 Round 5	Zürich	1–3	Basel	Letzigrund, Zürich
14:30	Botteron (1:1); Zwicker (yellow card)	FCZ summary FCB summary	36' (0:1) Stohler; 68' (1:2) Marti; (yellow card) Demarmels; 89' (1:3) Lauscher	Attendance: 13,800; Referee: (Switzerland) Gottlieb Barmettler (Luzern)

20 March 1979 Quarter-final	Xamax	5–0	Basel	Stade de la Maladière, Neuchâtel
	Decastel 21' (1:0); Küffer 70' (2:0); Richard 77' (3:0); Lüthi 85' (4:0); Decastel 87' (5:0)	FCB summary		Attendance: 2,000; Referee: (Switzerland) Peter Scherz (Aegerten)

=== Swiss League Cup ===
22 July 1978 Round 1 first leg	Basel	2–0	Grenchen	St. Jakob Stadium, Basel
18:30	Siegenthaler 24' (1:0); Maissen 56' (2:0)	FCB summary		Attendance: 900; Referee: (Switzerland) Bruno Burgener (Kriens)

29 July 1978 Second leg	Grenchen	3–2 (3–4 agg.)	Basel	Stadium Brühl, Grenchen
19:00	Wirth 43' (1:1); Albanese 51' (2:1); Huser 80' (3:2)	FCB summary	14' (0:1) Stohler; 57' (2:2) Baldinger	Attendance: 900; Referee: (Switzerland) Gerald Corminboeuf

4 October 1978 Round 2	Basel	1–0	Nordstern Basel	St. Jakob Stadium, Basel
	Stohler (penalty missed) 52′ Schönenberger 79'	FCB summary		Attendance: 6,600; Referee: (Switzerland) Denis Perrenoud
Note: 52nd minute: Illa saves Stohler's penalty.

11 November 1978 Quarter-final	Basel	3–1	Luzern	St. Jakob Stadium, Basel
15:00	Demarmels 42' (1:0); Marti 52' (2:0); Baldinger 54' (3:0)	FCB summary	66' (pen. 3:1) Christen	Attendance: 1,400; Referee: (Switzerland) Werner Bösch (Sutz-Lattrigen)

24 February 1979 Semi-final	Xamax	0–2	Basel	Stade de la Maladière, Neuchâtel
15:00		FCB summary	40' (0:1) Baldinger; 66' Schönenberger	Attendance: 1,150; Referee: (Switzerland) Hans Wolfer

1 May 1979 Final	Servette	2–2 (4–3 p)	Basel	St. Jakob Stadium, Basel
19:00	Peterhans 5'; Barberis 37'	FCB summary	18', 87' Schönenberger	Attendance: 8,500; Referee: (Switzerland) Jean-Marie Macheret, (Rueyres-St-Laurent)
	Penalties
	Schnyder (penalty scored); Barberis (penalty scored); Guyot (penalty missed); Trinchero (penalty scored); Engel (penalty scored)		(penalty scored) Stohler; (penalty scored) Maradan; (penalty missed) Schönenberger; (penalty scored) von Wartburg; (penalty missed) Tanner

Servette won 4–3 on penalties

=== UEFA Cup ===
First round

13 September 1978 First leg	Basel (Switzerland)	2–3	(Germany) VfB Stuttgart	Basel
20:00	Stohler 30' von Wartburg (yellow card) 30' (red card) 40'; Tanner 78'	Report	44' D. Hoeneß; 54', 70' Ohlicher; (yellow card) 85' Förster	Stadium: St. Jakob Stadium; Referee: (Scotland) Brian McGinlay

27 September 1978 Second leg	VfB Stuttgart (Germany)	4–1	(Switzerland) Basel	Stuttgart
20:00	Kelsch 24', 48', 68'; Müller 64'	Report	35' Schönenberger	Stadium: Neckarstadion; Referee: (Ukraine) Miroslav Stupar

VfB Stuttgart won 7–3 on aggregate.

=== Coppa delle Alpi ===
Group B

1 July 1978 Round 1	Basel (Switzerland)	2–1	(France) Stade de Reims	St. Jakob Stadium Basel
20:00	Lauscher 12' (1:0); Stohler 87' (pen. 87)	FCB summary	35' (1:1) Coste	Attendance: 1,500; Referee: (France) Alain Delmer

4 July 1978 Round 2	Sochaux (France)	1–1	(Switzerland) Basel	Stade René Blum, Montbéliard
17:00	Revelli 56' (1:0)	FCB summary	(pen. 1:1) Stohler	Referee: (Switzerland) Rudolf Affolter

8 July 1978 Round 3	Stade de Reims (France)	1–1	(Switzerland) Basel	Reims
	Santamaria 73' (1:1)	FCB summary	40' (0:1) Demarmels	Attendance: 2,000; Referee: (Switzerland) Ernest Guignet Yverdon

11 July 1978 Round 4	Basel (Switzerland)	0–2	(France) Sochaux	St. Jakob Stadium Basel
20 :00		FCB summary	30' (0:1) Benoit; 40' (0:2) Parizon	Attendance: 1,800; Referee: (France) Achille Verbecke

NB: teams did not play compatriots

Group table

Pos	Team	Pld	W	D	L	GF	GA	GD	BP	Pts	
1	Lausanne-Sport	4	2	1	1	12	8	+4	1	6 (Note: 1 bonus point awarded for a victory by 3 or more goals)	Continue to final
2	Sochaux	4	1	2	1	7	7	0	0	4	
3	Basel	4	1	2	1	4	5	−1	0	4	
4	Stade de Reims	4	1	1	2	6	9	−3	0	3	

Source: rsssf.com

== See also ==
- History of FC Basel
- List of FC Basel players
- List of FC Basel seasons

== Sources ==
- Rotblau: Jahrbuch Saison 2015/2016. Publisher: FC Basel Marketing AG. ISBN 978-3-7245-2050-4
- Die ersten 125 Jahre. Publisher: Josef Zindel im Friedrich Reinhardt Verlag, Basel. ISBN 978-3-7245-2305-5
- FCB archive online
- Switzerland 1978–79 at RSSSF
- Swiss League Cup at RSSSF
- Cup of the Alps 1978 at RSSSF
