= Aliabiev =

Aliabiev may refer to:

- Alexander Alyabyev, Russian-Empire composer
- Anatoly Alyabyev, Soviet athlete
- Viacheslav Aliabiev, Ukrainian soccer player
- Victor Ivanovich Alyabyev, Soviet scientist
