= ISES =

ISES may refer to:

- International Solar Energy Society
- International Society of Exposure Science
- International Space Environment Service
