= Gérard Rousset =

Gérard Rousset may refer to:

- Gérard Rousset (fencer)
- Gérard Rousset (rugby union)
