= Perttunen =

Perttunen is a surname. Notable people with the surname include:

- Arhippa Perttunen (1769–1841), Karelian folk singer
- Väinö Perttunen (1906–1984), Finnish wrestler
