= Senator Denis =

Senator Denis may refer to:

- Howard A. Denis (born 1939), Maryland State Senate
- Mo Denis (born 1961), Nevada State Senate

== See also ==
- Senator Dennis (disambiguation)
