= Iosif Töjär =

Romanian wrestler

Personal information
- Nationality: Romanian
- Born: 29 November 1911 Oradea, Austria-Hungary
- Died: 5 February 1991 (aged 79)

Sport
- Sport: Wrestling

Iosif Töjär (29 November 1911 – 5 February 1991) was a Romanian wrestler. He competed in the men's Greco-Roman bantamweight at the 1936 Summer Olympics.
