= Robert Baldinger =

Swiss footballer (born 1954)

Personal information
- Full name: Robert Baldinger
- Date of birth: 1 March 1954 (age 72)
- Place of birth: Leuggern, Switzerland
- Positions: Midfielder; striker

Youth career
- until 1973: FC Wettingen

Senior career*
Years	Team	Apps	(Gls)
1973–1978	FC Wettingen	63	(7)
1978–1979	FC Basel	16	(1)
1979–1980	FC Aarau		
1982–1983	FC Baden	3	(0)
- * Club domestic league appearances and goals

Robert Baldinger (born 1 March 1954) is a Swiss retired footballer who played as midfielder or striker in the 1970s and early 1980s.

Baldinger first played for Wettingen in the Nationalliga B, second tier of Swiss football. He joined Basel's first team in 1978–79 season under head-coach Helmut Benthaus. After playing in four Cup of the Alps games, he played four test games and then two games in the Swiss League Cup, in which he scored one goal on 29 July 1978 against Grenchen.

Baldinger played his domestic league debut for the club in the away game on 12 August 1978 as Basel were defeated 1–2 by Chiasso. He scored his first league goal for his club on 16 June 1979 in the away game as Basel won 2–4 against Zürich.

In his second season with the club Baldinger played only nine test games and one in the domestic league before he left. During this time he played a total of 49 games for Basel scoring a total of eight goals. 16 of these games were in the Nationalliga A, seven in the Swiss League Cup and Swiss Cup, four in the European competitions (UEFA Cup and Cup of the Alps) and 20 were friendly games. He scored one goal in the domestic league, three in the Swiss League Cup, two in the Swiss Cup and the other two were scored during the test games.

After his time with Basel, Basel moved on to FC Aarau and later to FC Baden both in the second tier of Swiss football.

== Sources ==
- Die ersten 125 Jahre. Publisher: Josef Zindel im Friedrich Reinhardt Verlag, Basel. ISBN 978-3-7245-2305-5
- Verein "Basler Fussballarchiv" Homepage
