= Dante Bertoli =

Italian wrestler

Personal information
- Nationality: Italian
- Born: 28 January 1913 Sassuolo, Italy
- Died: 11 September 1996 (aged 83) Velletri, Italy

Sport
- Sport: Wrestling

Dante Bertoli (28 January 1913 – 11 September 1996) was an Italian wrestler. He competed in the men's Greco-Roman bantamweight at the 1936 Summer Olympics.
