= Ali Erfan =

Egyptian wrestler (born 1915)

Personal information
- Nationality: Egyptian
- Born: 18 May 1915 Cairo, Egypt

Sport
- Sport: Wrestling

Ali Erfan (born 18 March 1915, date of death unknown) was an Egyptian wrestler. He competed in the men's Greco-Roman bantamweight at the 1936 Summer Olympics.
