= Rolf Schönauer =

Swiss footballer (born 1961)

Personal information
- Full name: Rolf Schönauer
- Date of birth: 20 January 1961 (age 65)
- Place of birth: Switzerland
- Position: Defender

Youth career
- until 1977: SC Binningen

Senior career*
Years	Team	Apps	(Gls)
1977–1978	SC Binningen		
1978–1980	FC Basel	2	(0)
- * Club domestic league appearances and goals

Rolf Schönauer (born 20 January 1961) is a Swiss retired footballer who played in the late 1970s and 1980s as defender.

Schönauer played his youth football by SC Binningen and advanced to their first team in 1977. During the summer 1978 he joined FC Basel's first team for their 1978–79 season under head-coach Helmut Benthaus. He played his first match for the club in the Swiss League Cup in an away match against Grenchen. He played his domestic league debut for the club in the away game on 19 June 1979 as Basel were defeated 2–4 by Zürich

In his two seasons with the club Schönauer played a total of nine games for Basel without scoring a goal. Two of these games were in the Nationalliga A, one in the Swiss League Cup and six were friendly games.

== Sources ==
- Die ersten 125 Jahre. Publisher: Josef Zindel im Friedrich Reinhardt Verlag, Basel. ISBN 978-3-7245-2305-5
- Verein "Basler Fussballarchiv" Homepage
