= Antoni Rokita =

Polish wrestler

Personal information
- Nationality: Polish
- Born: 25 May 1909 Piskorów, Congress Poland, Russian Empire
- Died: 25 January 1963 (aged 53)

Sport
- Sport: Wrestling

Antoni Rokita (25 May 1909 – 25 January 1963) was a Polish wrestler. He competed in the men's Greco-Roman bantamweight at the 1936 Summer Olympics.
