= Joan Daisey =

American research scientist (1941–2000)

- Born: 1941; New York City
- Died: 29 February 2000 (aged 58–59)
- Alma mater: Georgian Court University; Seton Hall University
- Employer: Lawrence Berkeley National Laboratory; NYU Langone Health (1975–1986)

Joan M. Daisey (1941 – February 29, 2000) was a physical chemist who researched air quality. She studied airborne organic pollutants in both indoor and outdoor environments, and developed methods for the sampling, analysis and bioassay of complex airborne mixtures. Daisey was a senior staff scientist at the Lawrence Berkeley National Laboratory (Berkeley Lab) of the U.S. Department of Energy and chaired the U.S. Environmental Protection Agency's Science Advisory Board. Daisey also served as president of the International Society of Exposure Assessment.

== Early life and education ==
Joan M. Gallagher (later Daisey) was born in New York City in 1941. Daisey graduated from Georgian Court College in New Jersey with a B.A. in chemistry in 1962. She began her graduate work at the University of California, Berkeley and completed her Ph.D. in physical chemistry at Seton Hall University in 1970.

== Career ==
After graduation, Daisey became an assistant professor of chemistry at Mount St. Mary College in Newburgh, New York, and began studying organic components of the atmosphere. In 1975, she joined New York University School of Medicine as a post-doctoral student, working with Morton Lippmann in the Aerosol and Inhalation laboratory. From 1975-1986, Daisey was a faculty member and principal investigator in the Department of Environmental Medicine at New York University. Her work on the Airborne Toxic Elements and Organic Substances Study is described in the book Toxic air pollution: a comprehensive study of non-criteria air pollutants (1987), written with Paul J. Lioy.

Joan moved to the Lawrence Berkeley National Laboratory in 1986. There she rose to the position of senior scientist. In 1989, she became the Department Head for the Indoor Environment Department of the Environmental Energy Technologies Division. Daisey supervised a staff of 60, and led a significant expansion of the department's work that connected research on indoor and outdoor air pollutants.

Daisey served on the Science Advisory Board of the U.S. Environmental Protection Agency (EPA) beginning in 1987 and became Chair of the Science Advisory Board in 1998. She served with the Integrated Human Exposure Committee and the Research Strategies Advisory Committee, among many others during her career.

In 1989 Joan Daisey was a founding member of the International Society of Exposure Assessment (ISEA) (later renamed the International Society of Exposure Science, ISES). She served as its president from 1995-1996.

Daisey published over 150 works about organic pollutants and indoor and outdoor air particles, emphasizing the connections and pathways between indoor and outdoor environments. She studied the effects of ventilation and infiltration on indoor air quality; the health effects of tobacco smoke, volatile organic compounds (VOCs) and particulate matter; the exposure pathways enabling volatile organic compounds to enter buildings; and relationships between indoor and outdoor air quality.

Daisey died on February 29, 2000, in Berkeley, California, due to cancer. She was survived by her husband, Eugene Thomas Daisey of Walnut Creek, California, and son Christian. Compilations of conference papers for the Indoor Air Conferences for 1999 and 2002 were dedicated in her honor.

== Awards and honors ==
- 2000, Constance L. Mehlman Award, International Society of Exposure Science, posthumous presentation

== Joan M. Daisey Outstanding Young Scientist Award ==
The Outstanding Young Scientist Award of the ISEA, which Daisey had helped to establish in 1998, was renamed in her honor in 2000. Winners of the award include Amanda M. Wilson (2025), Donghai Liang (2024), Courtney Carignan (2023), Krystal Pollitt (2022), Amina Salamova (2021), Peter Fantke (2020), Lesliam Quirós-Alcalá (2019) and Kate Hoffman (2018).

== Selected publications ==
- Lioy, Paul J.; Daisey, Joan M. (1987). Toxic air pollution: a comprehensive study of non-criteria air pollutants. Chelsea, Mich: Lewis Publishers. ISBN 9780873710572.
