= Hüseyin Erkmen =

Turkish wrestler

Personal information
- Nationality: Turkish
- Born: 8 September 1915

Sport
- Sport: Wrestling

Hüseyin Erkmen (born 8 September 1915, date of death unknown) was a Turkish wrestler. He competed in the men's Greco-Roman bantamweight at the 1936 Summer Olympics.
