= Alfred Gilles =

Belgian wrestler

Personal information
- Nationality: Belgian
- Born: 17 December 1908

Sport
- Sport: Wrestling

Alfred Gilles (17 December 1908 – 5 December 1983) was a Belgian wrestler. He competed in the men's Greco-Roman bantamweight at the 1936 Summer Olympics.
