= Robert Voigt =

Danish wrestler (1913–1988)

Personal information
- Nationality: Danish
- Born: 19 May 1913 Copenhagen, Denmark
- Died: 25 November 1988 (aged 75) Copenhagen, Denmark

Sport
- Sport: Wrestling

Robert Voigt (19 May 1913 – 25 November 1988) was a Danish wrestler. He competed in the men's Greco-Roman bantamweight at the 1936 Summer Olympics. He was eliminated after the fourth of six rounds.
