= Evald Sikk =

Estonian wrestler (1910–1945)

Personal information
- Nationality: Estonian
- Born: 10 February 1910 Võru, Estonia
- Died: 8 August 1945 (aged 35) Tarasovka, Russia

Sport
- Sport: Wrestling

Evald Sikk (10 February 1910 – 8 August 1945) was an Estonian wrestler. He competed in the men's Greco-Roman bantamweight at the 1936 Summer Olympics. He was executed in a prison camp during World War II.
