= Karlo Toth =

Yugoslav wrestler (1907–1988)

Personal information
- Nationality: Yugoslav
- Born: 15 July 1907 Bačka Topola, Austria-Hungary
- Died: 25 August 1988 (aged 81) Subotica, Yugoslavia

Sport
- Sport: Wrestling

Karlo Toth (15 July 1907 – 25 August 1988) was a Yugoslav wrestler. He competed in the men's Greco-Roman bantamweight at the 1936 Summer Olympics.
