= Ferdinand Hýža =

Czech wrestler

Personal information
- Nationality: Czech
- Born: 26 June 1910
- Died: 8 March 1942 (aged 31)

Sport
- Sport: Wrestling

Ferdinand Hýža (26 June 1910 – 8 March 1942) was a Czech wrestler. He competed in the men's Greco-Roman bantamweight at the 1936 Summer Olympics.
