= Paul J. Lioy =

American scientist (1947–2015)

Paul James Lioy (May 27, 1947 – July 8, 2015) was a United States environmental health scientist born in Passaic, New Jersey, working in the field of exposure science. He was one of the world's leading experts in personal exposure to toxins. He published in the areas of air pollution, airborne and deposited particles, Homeland Security, and Hazardous Wastes. Lioy was a professor and division director at the Department of Environmental and Occupational Health, Rutgers University - School of Public Health. Until 30 June 2015 he was a professor and vice chair of the Department of Environmental and Occupational Medicine, Rutgers University - Robert Wood Johnson Medical School. He was deputy director of government relations and director of exposure science at the Rutgers Environmental and Occupational Health Sciences Institute in Piscataway, New Jersey.

Lioy has been recognized for his research and contributions to development of environmental policy by the International Society of Exposure Analysis (now International Society of Exposure Science) and by the Air & Waste Management Association, both with Lifetime Achievement Awards. Since 2002 he had been one of Information Sciences Institute’s Most Highly Cited Scientists in the Category of Environment and Ecology, and is one of the founders of the International Society of Exposure (Analysis) Science (1989).

== Early life and education ==
Lioy graduated from Passaic High School in 1965, and Montclair State College (today University), NJ in 1969 (Magnum Cum Laude) In 1971, he received a master's degree from Auburn University, AL, in Physics, and in 1975 an M.S. and Ph.D. in environmental science from Rutgers University.

== Career ==
=== University appointments ===
- 1973–1975: Physical Scientist (part-time) U.S. EPA, Region II, Surveillance and Analysis Division, NJ
- 1975–1978: Senior Air Pollution Engineer, Interstate Sanitation Commission, New York City, NY
- 1976–1978: Lecturer, Department of Civil Environmental Engineering, Polytechnic Institute of New York, New York City, NY
- 1978–1982: Assistant Professor, Institute of Environmental Medicine, New York University Medical Center, New York City, NY
- 1982–1985: Associate Professor, Institute of Environmental Medicine, New York University Medical Center, New York City, NY
- 1984–1985: Associate Director, Laboratory of Aerosol and Inhalation Research, Institute of Environmental Medicine, NYU Medical Center
- 1985–1989: Associate Professor, Department of Environmental and Community Medicine, UMDNJ-Robert Wood Johnson Medical School, Piscataway, NJ
- 1986–2015: Chief, Exposure Measurement and Assessment Division, DECM of Rutgers-RWJMS
- 1986–2015: Director, Exposure Science Division, Rutgers Environmental and Occupational Health Sciences Institute, (EOHSI) (formerly sponsored by UMDNJ and Rutgers University)
- 1986–2015: Professor, Graduate Faculty of Rutgers University: Department of Environmental Science, Public Health Program, and Toxicology Program, New Brunswick, NJ
- 1989–2015: Professor, Department of Environmental and Occupational Medicine, Rutgers - Robert Wood Johnson Medical School (RWJMS), Piscataway, NJ (formerly UMDNJ)
- 1990–2002: Faculty Administrator, EOHSI Analytical Laboratories
- 1992–2015: Director, Controlled Exposure Facility, EOHSI
- 1994–1995: Acting Deputy Director, Environmental and Occupational Health Sciences Institute, UMDNJ-RWJMS and Rutgers University
- 1995–2001: Deputy Director, Environmental and Occupational Health Sciences Institute, UMDNJ-RWJMS and Rutgers University
- 1999–2015: Co-Director, Center for Exposure and Risk Modeling, EOHSI
- 2000–2015: Professor, Rutgers - School of Public Health, Piscataway, NJ (formerly UMDNJ)
- 2001–2003: Acting Associate Director, Environmental and Occupational Health Sciences Institute, UMDNJ-RWJMS and Rutgers University
- 2003–2015: Deputy Director Government Relations, Rutgers Environmental and Occupational Health Sciences Institute (formerly sponsored by UMDNJ and Rutgers University)
- 2004–2015: Vice Chair, Department of Environmental and Occupational Medicine, Rutgers-RWJMS
- 2015: Division Director, School of Public Health, Rutgers
- 2015: Professor, Department of Environmental and Occupational Health, school of Public Health, Rutgers, university, Piscataway, NJ

=== Adjunct positions ===
- 1990: Visiting Scientist, RIVM, Bilthoven, The Netherlands
- 1996: Visiting Professor, Department of Biometry and Biostatistics, Medical University of South Carolina, Charleston, SC
- 2006-2009 and 2012–2105: Adjunct Professor, (volunteer) Department of Environmental and Occupational Health University of Pittsburgh Graduate School Public Health

== Awards and advisory committees ==
- Advisor, New Jersey Italian and Italian American Heritage Commission, Rutgers University
- First Year Physics Graduate Student Award for Academics, Auburn University, 1970
- National Defense Education Act, Title IV Fellow, Auburn University, 1969–1971
- United States Environmental Protection Agency Air Pollution Fellow, Rutgers University, 1971–1973
- Russell Scholar, Rutgers University, 1973–1974
- University Fellow, Rutgers University, 1973–1975
- Fellow of New York Academy of Sciences, Elected 1979
- Board Member, Mid-Atlantic States Section Air Pollution Control Association, 1978–1982
- Counselor, International Society for Environmental Epidemiology, 1988-1990 (Founding), Board of Directors
- Treasurer, International Society of Exposure Analysis, 1989–1991 (Co-Founder of Organization)
- Robert Wood Johnson Medical School Nominee for the UMDNJ Excellence Award, Biomedical Researcher 1992
- Member, Board of Environmental Studies and Toxicology, National Academy of Sciences, 1989–1992
- President, International Society of Exposure Analysis, 1993–1994
- Past president, International Society of Exposure Analysis, 1994–1995
- Chair, Science Advisory Board, Pelham Bay Landfill, NY Remediation, 1990–1997
- Recipient of Jerome Wesolowski Award for Lifetime Excellence in Exposure Assessment Research, International Society of Exposure Analysis, 1998
- Resolution for selection as a fellow by the Collegium provided by Union County, Board of Freeholders
- Extraordinary Citizen of Week, Union County, Star Ledger, September 1999
- Member, Dean's Advisory Council of the College of Science and Mathematics, Auburn University, 1996–1999
- Member, Technical Advisory Committee on Aggregate Exposure and Risk, Hampshire Research Institute, 1999–2000
- Chair, United States Environmental Protection Agency (EPA) Science Advisory Board, Committee on Health and Ecological Effects Valuation, Advisory Council on Clean Air Compliance Analysis, 1997–2002 (see EPA-SAB bio)
- Recipient of Frank A. Chambers Award for outstanding achievement in the science and art of air pollution control from the Air Waste Management Association, 2003
- Member, Council of Academic Policy Advisors to the New Jersey Legislature, 1998–2004
- Member, Science Advisory Board, European - EXPOLIS (Air Pollution Exposure Distribution of Adult Population in Europe) 1997-2004
- Member, International Joint Commission: Board on Air Quality, 1992–2006
- Member, Citizens Advisory Committee New York City DEP Brooklyn-Queens Aquifer Feasibility Study, 2002–2006
- Recipient of the 2006 R. Walter Schesinger Basic Science Mentoring Award, UMDNJ - Robert Wood Johnson Medical School
- Member of Sigma XI, 1980–2007
- Recipient of the 2008 Distinguished Alumnus Award from Physical Sciences, Mathematics and Engineering, Rutgers University Graduate School
- Recipient of the 2009-2011 Distinguished Lecturer Award from the International Society of Exposure Science, Pasadena, CA, 2008.
- Executive committee, New Jersey Office of Homeland Security and Preparedness College, 2007–2009
- Recipient of the Daughters of the American Revolution Founders Award, The Ellen Hardin Walworth Medal for Patriotism, 2009. A Resolution also approved by the New Jersey State Legislature.
- Recipient of the National Medal for Conservation from The Daughters of the American Revolution; 2009: Chapter and State of New Jersey Medalist
- Member, executive committee, Rutgers University Homeland Security Initiative, 2003–2011
- Co-chair, New Jersey Universities Consortium on Homeland Security Research 2006–2012
- Recipient of Cranford Chamber of Commerce Meritorious Service Award, acknowledged by resolution from the State Legislature, Union County, and Township of Cranford, 2012
- Institute for Scientific Information – Highly Cited Scientist – Environment and Ecology, 2002–2015
- Executive Committee, University Center for Disaster Preparedness and Emergency Response, 2007 – 2015
- Fellow, International Academy of Indoor Air Sciences, (Elected) 1999–2015
- Fellow, Collegium Ramazzini, Environmental & Occupational Medicine and Health, Carpi, Italy (Elected) 1999–2015
- Member, Douglass College, Rutgers University Academic Councilors, 1998–2015
- Member, EPA Science Advisory Board, 1992–2002, 2005–2015
- Member, research advisory board, Office of the Vice President for Research, Auburn University, 2009–2015
- Member, State of New Jersey Department of Environmental Protection Science Advisory Board, 2010–2015
- Member, College of Science and Mathematics Advisory Council, Montclair State University, 2005–2015
- Science Advisor, Health Environmental Science Institute (HESI) of International Life Sciences Institute (ILSI), Washington, DC, 2015

=== Major committee assignments - international, national, and regional ===
- Member, Interstate Hazardous Spill Response Committee, NJ, 1977
- Chairman, Peer Review Panel, U.S. EPA Indoor Air Pollution Program, 1984
- Chairman, New Jersey Clean Air Council, 1983–1985
- Member, National Academy of Sciences Committee on Air Pollution Epidemiology, 1983–1985
- Member, Canadian Royal Academy of Sciences Committee on Acid Aerosol Health Research, 1987
- Member, National Academy of Sciences, Workshop Panel, Health Risks from Exposure to Common Indoor Household Products in Allergic or Diseased Persons, 1987
- Chairman, NAS, National Research Council Committee on Exposure Assessment, 1987–1990
- Member, National Academy of Sciences, National Research Council Committee on Tropospheric Ozone Formation and Measurement, 1989–1991
- Member, Scientific Advisory Committee, Center for Environmental Epidemiology, University of Pittsburgh, School of Public Health, 1988–1992
- Member, USEPA, Health Effects, Grant's Peer Review Committee, 1989–1992
- Member, Scientific Advisory Committee on Harvard Multi-City Acid Health Study, Harvard University, 1987–1993
- Chair, Particle Total Exposure Assessment Methodology Review Panel, EPA, Science Advisory Board, 1989–1994
- Member, National Academy of Sciences, National Research Council Committee on Risk Management in Department of Energy's Environmental Restoration Program, 1993–1994
- Member, Air Pollution Guidelines Committee for Europe, 1993–1994
- Member, New Jersey Clean Air Council, 1981–1994
- Temporary Councilor, World Health Organization, 1997
- Member or Consultant, Science Advisory Board Subcommittees, 1984–2001, U.S. EPA: 1. Risk Assessment; 2. Integrated Air Cancer; 3. Integrated Environmental Management Project; 4. Total Exposure Assessment; 5. Clean Air Science Advisory Committee
- Member, EPA Science Advisory Board Committee on the Particulate Matter Centers Research Program, Review Panel, 2001
- Member, Advisory Committee on NJ Southdown Quarry Exposure/Risk Characterization, 2000–2001
- Member, Harvard University Particulate Matter Center Advisory Committee, 2000–2004
- Member, Healthcare Issues Advisory Task Force of NJ, 2002–2004
- Member, New Jersey Department of Health and Senior Services, Trenton/Hamilton Processing Center Environmental Clearance Committee (anthrax), 2002–2004
- Member, National Academy of Sciences, National Research Council Committee on Research Priorities for Airborne Particulate Matter, 1998–2005
- Member, New Jersey Department of Health and Senior Services, Cancer Cluster Task Force, 2003–2005
- Vice-Chair, US EPA, World Trade Center Expert Technical Panel – Indoor Clean-up Issues, 2004–2005
- Member, Executive Leadership Group of the New Jersey Chemical-Biological-Radiological-Nuclear-Explosive Center for Training and Research at UMDNJ, 2005–2006
- Member, Homeland Security Policy Committee, NJ 2005-2006
- Member, University Committee for Environmental Affairs, Rutgers, 2005–2008
- Member, Advisory Board of University of Pittsburgh Academic Consortium for Excellence (UPACE) in Environmental Public Health Tracking (EPHT) (in collaboration with Drexel University), 2006 – 2009
- Member, EPA Federal Insecticide, Fungicide, and Rodenticide Act Panel on Exposure Assessment Protocols, 2009 – 2011
- Member, Committee on Human and Environmental Exposure Science in the 21st Century, National Academies, 2010–2012
- Senior Technical Advisor, Pediatric Environmental Medicine Center, University of Pittsburgh Medical Center, Pittsburgh, PA, 2009 – 2012
- Vice Chair, National Research Council Committee on Exposure Science, 2010 – 2012
- Member, Harvard School of Public Health, Superfund External Advisory Committee, 2010 – 2014
- Member, EPA Science Advisory Board, Council on Homeland Security, 2005–2014.
- Member, Icahn School of Medicine at Mount Sinai, External Advisory Committee, NIEHS Center, 2013–2015
- Member, EPA Science Advisory Board panel on asbestos, 2008–2015
- Member, U.S. Consumer Product Safety Commission (CPSC) Chronic Hazard Advisory Panel (CHAP) on children's health of phthalates and phthalate alternatives as used in children's toys and child care articles, 2010–2015

== Personal life and death ==
In 1971, he married the former Jean Yonone and had one son, Jason. Lioy died on July 8, 2015, after collapsing at Newark Liberty International Airport, aged 68 of undetermined causes. Lioy's survivors included his mother, also named Jean Lioy, a sister, Mary Jean Giannini and two grandchildren.

== Books ==
- Kneip TJ, Lioy PJ (eds)., Air Pollution Control Association. 1980. Aerosols, anthropogenic and natural, sources and transport. New York, NY: New York Academy of Sciences. ISBN 0-89766-064-1
- Lioy PJ, Lioy MJY (eds). 1983. Air sampling instruments for evaluation of atmospheric contaminants. 6th ed. Cincinnati, OH: American Conference of Governmental Industrial Hygienists. ISBN 0-936712-43-0
- Lioy PJ, Daisey JM (eds). 1987. Toxic air pollution : a comprehensive study of non-criteria air pollutants. Chelsea, MI.: Lewis Publishers. ISBN 0-87371-057-6
- Lioy PJ. 2010. DUST: The Inside Story of Its Role in the September 11th Aftermath (Foreword By Tom Kean). Lanham, MD: Rowman and Littlefield. ISBN 1-4422-0148-7 (Paperback and E-Book, 2011)
- Lioy PJ, Weisel C. 2014. Exposure Science: Basic Principles and Applications. Oxford, UK, Academic Press, Elsevier ISBN 978-0124201675

== Legacy in exposure science ==
Lioy's reputation evolved primarily based upon his role in developing scientific principles and refining the approaches that define the field of exposure science. This discipline is associated with the field of environmental and occupational health sciences, which includes epidemiology and risk assessment, and prevention. In a 1990 article published in Environmental Science and Technology he was the first to properly locate exposure science as the bridge between traditional environmental sciences and the understanding of human health outcomes. Building upon the work of occupational hygiene and the work of Wayne Ott, Lioy has clearly shown that the most important aspect of total human exposure is whether or not an individual comes into contact with a toxin, discussed in a 2010 review article on exposure science and his recent book on exposure science. In the latter he has clearly linked external and internal markers of exposure. Thus, prevention is a key part of the application of this field of science. He re-analyzed the work of the "father of occupational medicine", Bernardino Ramazzini who provided the initial reasons for examining contact with an agent to define ways to control occupational illness. This historical analysis can be used to improve the way exposure science evolves in the future. Lioy is also a Fellow of the Collegium Ramazzini.

Paul Lioy was a central figure in investigating exposure to the air pollutant tropospheric ozone, chloroform and other toxicant exposures from shower water, hexavalent chromium wastes, and most recently, the exposures derived from the dust and smoke released in the aftermath of the September 11 attacks on the World Trade Center in 2001. He helped develop exposure science in efforts to help the environmental response after disasters. He has also been a major figure in defining some of the basic data requirements (and providing exposure indices) for examining human exposures within the National Children's Study. He was a Co-Principal Investigator within the portion of the National Human Exposure Assessment Survey (NHEXAS) conducted in five mid-western states, led by Edo Pellizzari of Research Triangle Institute. Currently his research addresses human exposure to engineered nanotechnology consumer products and the exposure of athletes to artificial turf used on athletic fields. In addition, from 1987 to 1991 he was the chairman of the First National Research Council (NRC) Committee that directly addressed human exposure issues and published Human Exposure to Air Pollutants: Advances and Opportunities," also called "White Book." He was Vice Chair of the NRC committee on Exposure Science that produced the report entitled "Exposure Science in the 21st Century: A Vision and A Strategy". He was also vice chair of the WTC Technical Panel that was formed to address the issues of residential cleanup during the WTC Aftermath.

=== Ozone ===
During the early 1980s Lioy recognized that the public health metric for defining exposure of the general population to ground level ozone (smog) was incorrect and that the one-hour standard for peak ozone levels should be replaced by an eight-hour standard. Independently, Peter Rombout, RIVM, Netherlands, discovered the same issue. In 1986, they collaborated and published an article on the need for an eight-hour ozone standard. Lioy's group also conducted research on the relationship between ozone exposure and visits to emergency rooms during the summertime. In 2002, the United States Environmental Protection Agency (EPA) published an eight-hour NAAQS ozone standard based upon the scientific exposure–response evidence from multiple laboratories that exposures to asthmatics and others to eight hours of ozone above 0.80 ppm. This standard for protection of public health was tightened to 0.75 ppm but remains as an 8-hour contact with the air pollutant, and is in final review for a further tightening of the 8-hour standard.

=== Semivolatile chemical exposures in the home ===
In the 1990s Lioy's laboratory became increasingly focused on dust in the home as a potential metric of exposure to metals and organic compounds. Included was the concurrent scientific issue of the semi-volatility of the materials associated with dust particles. This led to studies that demonstrated that semi-volatile pesticides should not just be considered just residues after application, but as toxin that can be spread throughout the home based process of evaporation and absorption and adsorption. This process was described in an article Published in 1998, and focused on the accumulation of pesticides in children's toys, and ways to protect toys were summarized in popular magazines and web sites. The work was used in revisions of the EPA standards for use of the pesticide chlorpyrifos indoors. The complex issues of dust and semi-volatile toxins in homes were published in 2002 and 2006 review articles. Additionally he expanded this work to encompass releases and deposition of many chemicals in carpets and other plush surfaces.

=== Chromium wastes ===
During the late 1980s the state of NJ discovered that wastes from the refining and production of the chrome plated products had been used as apparent Clean fill in various residential settings, and was also had contaminated a number other industrial locations. Lioy conducted a comprehensive study of chromium wastes in Jersey City, including residential exposures and the bioavailability and size distribution if the wastes. The work found that similar to current lead problems, the chromium exposures indoors were highly related to the levels found in house dust and not ambient air. In addition the use of dust laden corium as a marker of exposure was extremely valuable in conclusively defining that the removal of the wastes in the residential neighborhoods brought the levels of chromium down to background by the end of 2000. The efforts are continuing in Jersey City and are now using analytical methods perfected at EOHSI to measure the levels of the hexavalent chromium (carcinogenic form) in human blood and in the areas around remaining industrial sites, that are beginning to receive final remediation. Acomprehensive review paper on this work was published by Stern, Gochfeld and Lioy.

=== World Trade Center dust ===
In the wake of the September 11 attacks on the World Trade Center (WTC), Lioy was able to see the dust plumes from his home in Cranford, New Jersey. The major environmental and occupational health related issue during the aftermath of the building collapses was the size range and composition of the dust and smoke that was released during the first hours to days post collapse of the twin towers, and subsequently the dust that had deposited indoors and required cleanup. In collaboration with multiple laboratories, Lioy examined the composition and size distribution of the WTC dust in detail for inorganic, organic and ionic species. The results were published in a 2002 article entitled Characterization of the dust/smoke aerosol that settled east of the WTC in lower Manhattan after the collapse of the WTC September 11, 2001, and have been used to understand the cause of the WTC cough and other health outcomes. In other work that Lioy and colleagues published through 2009, they described the time line of exposure to the local population and workers from the moments after the collapse through December 2001, and pointed out the many lessons that can be learned from the WTC in order to effectively respond to other disasters. At the time of his death, he was working with Dr. Philip J. Landrigan et al. of Mount Sinai School of Medicine on the long-term health effects experienced by WTC workers. During the aftermath Lioy was interviewed many times by the Media on WTC Dust related issues from October 2001 through 2011 The work of Lioy and his colleagues is mentioned in a book by Anthony Depalma entitled City of Dust: Illness, Arrogance, and 9/11. Lioy published a book on the WTC dust and his experiences entitled Dust: the Inside Story of its Role in the September 11th Aftermath in 2010. In 2009 he received an Ellen Hardin Walworth National Patriotism Medal from the Daughters of the American Revolution for his work on the World Trade Center aftermath.

=== Nanoparticles ===
Dr. Lioy's research has expanded to covering exposure of humans to nanoparticles released by Consumer Products.
