= Josef Buemberger =

Austrian wrestler

Personal information
- Nationality: Austrian
- Born: 19 December 1904 Innsbruck, Austria-Hungary
- Died: 20 May 2001 (aged 96) Schwaz, Austria

Sport
- Sport: Wrestling

Josef Buemberger (19 December 1904 – 20 May 2001) was an Austrian wrestler. He competed in the men's Greco-Roman bantamweight at the 1936 Summer Olympics.
