= Senator Dennis (disambiguation) =

George R. Dennis (1822–1882) was a U.S. Senator from Maryland from 1873 to 1879, and also served in the Maryland State Senate. Senator Dennis or Denis may also refer to:

- Elias Smith Dennis (1812–1894), Illinois State Senate
- John Dennis (Missouri politician) (1917–2000), Missouri State Senate
- Leonard G. Dennis (died 1885), Florida State Senate
- Max Dennis (1925–1986), Ohio State Senate
- Rembert Dennis (1915–1992), South Carolina State Senate
- William M. Dennis (1810–1882), Wisconsin State Senate

== See also ==
- Senator Denis (disambiguation)
