= Scientific Advisory Panel =

The Scientific Advisory Panel (SAP) was created on November 28, 1975, pursuant to Section 25(d) of the Federal Insecticide, Fungicide, and Rodenticide Act (7 U.S.C. 136w), to provide scientific advice on pesticides and pesticide related issues as to the impact on health and the environment of certain regulatory actions. The Food Quality Protection Act (P.L. 104-170) established a Science Review Board consisting of 60 scientists who are available to the Scientific Advisory Panel on an ad hoc basis to assist in reviews conducted by the Panel. The role of the SAP has been expanded to that of a peer review body for current scientific issues that may influence the direction of EPA’s regulatory decisions. The Panel is composed of seven members who are selected on the basis of their professional qualifications to assess the impact of pesticides on health and the environment. Members are appointed by the EPA Administrator from a list of 12 nominees submitted by the National Institutes of Health and the National Academy of Sciences.
