= Emil Cohen (comedian) =

American Jewish comedian (1911–2000)

Emil Cohen - "Americas Foremost American Jewish Humorist"

Emil Cohen (1911- February 12, 2000) was an American comedian, humorist and entertainer. He was billed as "America's Foremost American Jewish Humorist". He frequently performed at the Grossinger Hotel in Liberty, New York, in the so-called "Borscht Belt". Cohen's Yiddish humor was well received by the predominantly Jewish audiences in this area.

Cohen was born in Elizabeth, New Jersey in 1911, the son of Julius and Ida (Magidoff). He was raised in Wilmington, Delaware with his sister Rose and his brothers Hym and Phil.

After serving in the U.S. Army Air Forces during World War II, Cohen became a comedian at the Grossinger Pancoast Hotel in Miami Beach, Florida. It was there he met and married Lillian Rothman in 1950. The couple had two sons, Jay and David.

Cohen developed a unique style of humor in which he delivered jokes and stories with a punch line in Yiddish followed immediately by an English translation. His smooth delivery ensured that audience members who only understood English could still appreciate the joke in its authentic style. Cohen was known for his double-entendre Yiddish-English humor, particularly his translation of Abraham Lincoln's Gettysburg Address into Yiddish. His humor was inspired by the lives of the Jews of Eastern Europe in the nineteenth and early twentieth centuries, and Cohen worked to preserve the heritage of Yiddish humor.

Cohen was also a raconteur and singer of traditional Yiddish songs, Chassidic melodies, Palestinian songs, and Jewish cantorial selections.

Cohen frequently spoke to groups in support of Jewish philanthropic causes. During his career, Cohen raised tens of millions of dollars for the United Jewish Appeal and Israel Bonds.

Cohen continued to perform until about a year before his death in 2000 at age 88.

== Recordings ==
- "Emil Cohen - America's Foremost American-Jewish Humorist" Emco Records #1201.
- "Emil Cohen Recorded Live in T'synagogues and T'centers" 1978 Emco Records EM-1202
