= Izaäk Boot =

Dutch preacher

Izaäk Boot (18 September 1930 – 1 February 2000) was a theologian and pastor in the Dutch Reformed Church.

== Biography ==
Boot was born in Kortgene, in Zeeland. After secondary education at the lyceum in Goes he studied theology at Utrecht University. He received his doctorate in 1971, having written a dissertation on allegorical interpretations of The Song of Songs under professor G.P. van Itterzon.

His first pastorate was in Wijngaarden in 1961. In 1973 he accepted the call to Nijkerkerveen and in 1977 to Boven-Hardinxveld.

Although he was a gifted and original Bible expositor (rather than possessing great pastoral talent and skill) Boot retired early on 18 September 1992, saying later that he had found it increasingly 'difficult to make traditional biblical teaching relevant and comprehensible to modern man'. He died of lung cancer in 2000.

During his lifetime Boot's criticism of intensive livestock farming methods and his concern for animal welfare were considered unusual, both among his colleagues in the 'experiential theology' modality of the Dutch Reformed Church, as well as by the predominantly rural congregations he served, although his views and convictions are now assessed as ahead of their time.
