= Franz Christen =

Swiss wrestler

Personal information
- Nationality: Swiss
- Born: 22 April 1907 Madiswil, Switzerland

Sport
- Sport: Wrestling

Franz Christen (born 22 April 1907, date of death unknown) was a Swiss wrestler. He competed in the men's Greco-Roman bantamweight at the 1936 Summer Olympics.
