= Georges Bayle (wrestler) =

French wrestler

Personal information
- Nationality: French
- Born: 25 February 1914

Sport
- Sport: Wrestling

Georges Bayle (25 February 1914 – 9 February 2000) was a French wrestler. He competed in the men's Greco-Roman bantamweight at the 1936 Summer Olympics.
