= Viacheslav Aliabiev =

Ukrainian footballer

Personal information
- Full name: Viacheslav Mikhailovich Aliabiev
- Date of birth: 5 February 1934
- Date of death: 11 June 2009 (aged 75)
- Position: Full back

Senior career*
Years	Team	Apps	(Gls)
- Shakhtyor Stalino
- * Club domestic league appearances and goals

Viacheslav Mikhailovich Aliabiev (5 February 1934 – 11 June 2009) was a Ukrainian professional footballer who won the Soviet Cup in 1961 and 1962 with Shakhtyor Stalino. He died of cancer on 11 June 2009, at the age of 75.
