= Rudolf Zöhrer =

Austrian football goalkeeper

Personal information
- Date of birth: 28 March 1911
- Place of birth: Vienna, Austria
- Date of death: 12 February 2000 (aged 88)
- Place of death: Vienna, Austria
- Position: Goalkeeper

Senior career*
Years	Team	Apps	(Gls)
1931–1934	FC Admira Wacker Mödling		
1934–1945	FK Austria Wien		

International career
1932–1937	Austria	3	(0)
- * Club domestic league appearances and goals

Rudolf Zöhrer (28 March 1911 – 12 February 2000) was an Austrian football goalkeeper who played three times for the Austria national football team. Zöhrer also played for FC Admira Wacker Mödling and FK Austria Wien, Wiener AC, SK Donaufeld Wien and Floridsdorfer AC.
