= John M. Bevan =

American academic and innovator in higher education

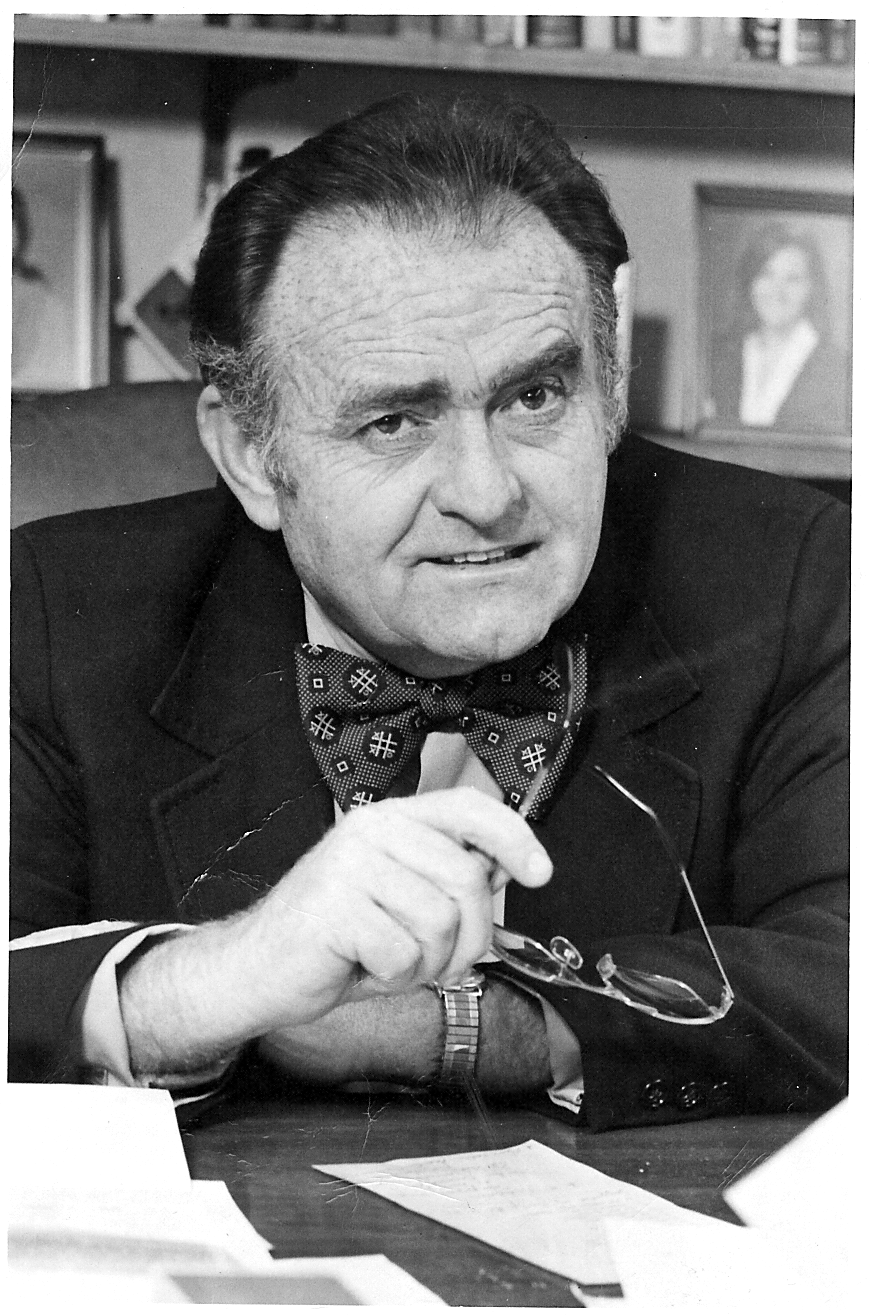
John M. Bevan

John M. "Jack" Bevan (December 5, 1924 - February 4, 2000) was an American academic and innovator in higher education.

== Early years ==
Bevan was born December 5, 1924, in Wilkes-Barre, PA, the son of William and Elizabeth Jones Bevan. He was proud of his Welsh heritage. He was noticed for his colorful bow-ties. Sometimes referred to by colleagues as “the Burning Bush,” he ignited challenge after challenge to fellow faculty members and students alike. “The greatest unused resource we have in this country is the minds of young people,” he said, and his goal was for the academic community to teach young minds how to be great thinkers and decision makers for their generation and generations to come.

== Education ==
Bevan received his AB from Franklin and Marshall College, and his BD, MA, and PHD degrees from Duke University. In addition, he was awarded honorary Doctor of Science and Doctor of Law Degrees. He was the founding academic vice-president of Florida Presbyterian College (later named Eckerd College) in St. Petersburg, Florida, and for the rest of his life cherished the memory of the talented faculty he was able to bring together to establish one of the most unusual curricula in the country. He served in similar capacities at the College of Charleston, Davidson College, and University of the Pacific. Prior to moving into administration, he had been a professor of psychology at Heidelberg College, Davidson College, and Duke University. Dr. Bevan served as Executive Director of the Charleston Higher Education Consortium and as an adjunct professor in the Department of Psychiatry and Behavioral Sciences, School of Medicine, Medical University of South Carolina prior to his retirement in 1986.

== Acknowledgements ==
Bevan is remembered for his innovative approaches to education, his motivational challenges to members in the academic community and his dynamic oratory. He developed the first 4-1-4 programs, which were later adopted by countless universities across the country, the first undergraduate Teacher Corps program and one of the three initial Upward Bound programs. He developed the South Carolina's Governor's School and the South Carolina Professional Development Program for Science and Mathematics Teachers. He traveled extensively in Asia and helped develop academic programs in Japan, Taiwan, Hong Kong and India.

== Community service ==
Committed to community service and each individual’s responsibility to leave the world a better place, Bevan continued his work after retiring. He became a member of the Board of Trustees of Thornwell Home and School for Children, a member of the Board of Directors of Habitat for Humanity and Covenant House, a member of the Sumter Rotary and Fortnightly Clubs as well as the Cosmos Club of Washington, DC. He is remembered at Eckerd College through The John M. Bevan Award presented to an outstanding faculty member each year and The Bevan Memorial Scholarship which is awarded annually to rising juniors who are a catalyst for positive innovative programs within the college and community at large. The faculty lounge is also named in his honor.

== Family ==
Bevan married Louise Dabbs Bevan from the Salem Black River Presbyterian Church in Sumter, South Carolina in 1946. He worked tirelessly “to save the world before next Friday.” His wife, Louise, supported him and moved forward to complete several of his projects following his death. Together they had four children: Brenda, Elizabeth, John Jr., and Megan. He is survived by six grandchildren. Bevan was a member and elder at Salem Black River Presbyterian Church in the Salem Black River Community where his remains are interred. He is remembered as generous man of high principles who expected nothing less than the best effort possible from all who knew him.
