= Jørgen Boye Nielsen =

Danish hockey player (1925–2000)

Personal information
- Nationality: Danish
- Born: 28 February 1925 Frederiksberg, Denmark
- Died: 7 February 2000 (aged 74) Gladsaxe, Denmark

Sport
- Sport: Field hockey

Jørgen Boye Nielsen (28 February 1925 – 7 February 2000) was a Danish field hockey player who played for the Danish national team at the 1948 Summer Olympics in London. Jørgen Boye Nielsen played for Orient and played a total of 8 international matches from 1946–1948.

At the Olympics in 1948, the Danish field hockey team placed 13th and last after three defeats and a draw in the initial pool; thus, Denmark was eliminated from the tournament. Boye Nielsen played all four matches without scoring.
