= Science Advisory Board =

The Science Advisory Board (SAB) is a United States group of independent scientists selected by the Administrator of the U.S. Environmental Protection Agency (EPA). The board provides advice to the agency on the scientific and technical aspects of environmental problems and issues. Upon a request by the Administrator, the board reviews the scientific aspects of any reports or other written products prepared by the agency. Congress established the board in the Environmental Research, Development, and Demonstration Authorization Act of 1978.

Under Administrator Lee M. Thomas, the board conducted risk prioritization studies. His successor, William K. Reilly, commissioned the board to do a “reducing risk report” to inform what significant risk areas the EPA wasn’t addressing adequately.

The activities of the SAB are subject to the requirements of the Federal Advisory Committee Act. The SAB publishes a list of ongoing and completed advisory activities. Announcements about new SAB activities, formation of review panels and committees, and public meetings are published in the Federal Register.

== See also ==
- Scientific Advisory Panel - Advisors to EPA's pesticide program
