= Egon Svensson =

Swedish Greco-Roman wrestler

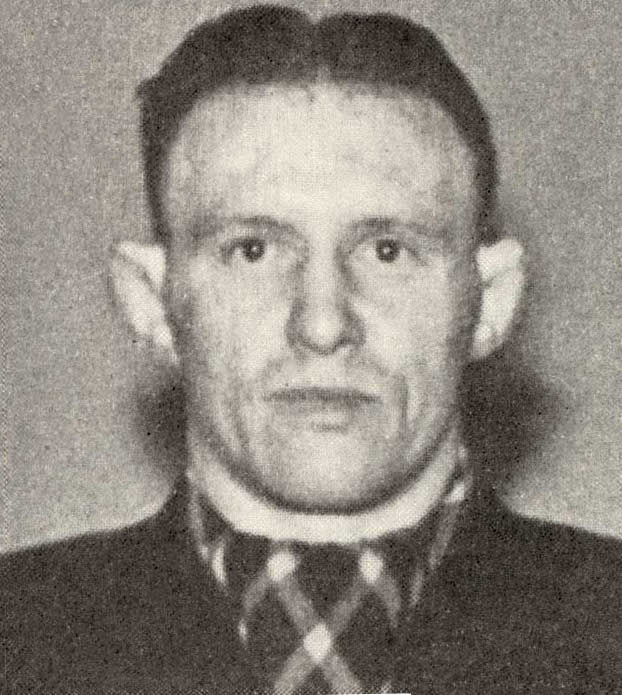

Personal information
- Born: 17 November 1913 Malmö, Sweden
- Died: 12 June 1995 (aged 81) Malmö, Sweden

Sport
- Sport: Greco-Roman wrestling
- Club: IK Sparta, Malmö
Medal record
Men's Greco-Roman wrestling
Representing Sweden
Olympic Games
Silver medal – second place	1936 Berlin	56 kg
European Championships
Silver medal – second place	1937 Paris	56 kg
Silver medal – second place	1938 Tallinn	61 kg

Egon Edvin Roland Svensson (17 November 1913 – 12 June 1995) was a bantamweight Greco-Roman wrestler from Sweden. He won silver medals at the 1936 Summer Olympics and 1937 and 1938 European Championships. His son Roland competed in the same event at the 1968 Olympics.
