= William Dale (lawyer) =

British lawyer

Sir William Leonard Dale, KCMG (17 June 1906 – 8 February 2000) was a British lawyer and civil servant. He was legal adviser to the Commonwealth Relations Office (later renamed to the Commonwealth Office) from 1961 to 1966.

The Sir William Dale Centre for Legislative Studies at the Institute of Advanced Legal Studies is named in his honour.
