= Väinö Perttunen =

Finnish wrestler

Personal information
- Nationality: Finnish
- Born: 12 September 1906 Kemi, Finland
- Died: 8 September 1984 (aged 77) Kemi, Finland

Sport
- Sport: Wrestling

Väinö Perttunen (12 September 1906 – 8 September 1984) was a Finnish wrestler. He competed in the men's Greco-Roman bantamweight at the 1936 Summer Olympics.
