= Elvira Gascón =

Spanish painter

Elvira Gascón Pérez
- Born: May 17, 1911; Almenar de Soria, Spain
- Died: February 10, 2000 (aged 88); Mexico City, Mexico
- Education: Real Academia de Bellas Artes de San Fernando, Madrid
- Known for: painting, engraving
- Notable work: 100 dibujos (Siglo XXI, 1972)

Elvira Gascón Pérez (May 17, 1911 – February 10, 2000) was a Spanish painter, drafter, Gascón also illustrated hundreds of books and periodicals, originating the drawing style known as helenismo picassiano.

== Life ==
Gascón was born in Almenar, Soria. She was accepted into Madrid's Real Academia de Bellas Artes de San Fernando in 1929 and studied there till 1935. She taught in Madrid at the Instituto Lope de Vega and the Escuela de Artes y Oficios. When the Spanish Civil War broke out in 1936, Gascón joined the Junta de Incautación del Tesoro Artístico Nacional, which seized national artistic treasures to keep them safe during the chaotic years of war and destruction. While working for the institute, she met her future husband, Roberto Fernández Balbuena (1891–1966), the institute's president and brother of the architect Gustavo Fernández Balbuena (1888–1931). Gascón and Fernández emigrated to exile in Mexico in 1939, following the defeat of the Spanish Republicans by the right-wing Nationalist rebels. In Mexico, Gascón became a prolific and widely known artist, with Mexican artists and intellectuals like Rubén Bonifaz Nuño praising her artistic technique and simplicity of style.

Later in life, Gascón suffered from Parkinson's disease. She died in Mexico City in 2000 at the age of 88.

== Career ==
In Mexico, Gascón painted several murals in churches, and participated in 28 single and 45 group exhibitions. She also illustrated magazines and about 150 books.
