= Mike Cowen =

South African development studies scholar

Michael Philip Cowen (January 16, 1945 – February 6, 2000) was a noted South African development studies scholar. He worked at the University of Rhodesia, the University of Nairobi, the Institute of Development Studies at the University of Sussex and the City of London Polytechnic (now London Metropolitan University) but his highest post achieved with his appointment in 1995 as the Director of the Institute of Development Studies at the University of Helsinki.

Born in Johannesburg to Sylvia Cowen (née Spira) and William Wolf (Bill) Cowen, Mike Cowen grew up in the British protectorate of Northern Rhodesia. He was of Lithuanian descent. His father, who was also born in South Africa, practised medicine in Rhodesia and Zambia, later serving as medical officer of health in Lusaka and being awarded an MBE in the 1971 Birthday Honours. Mike Cowen died suddenly in Finland at the age of 55; he was survived by his wife Riitta Launonen and two sons.

== Selected publications ==
- Cowen, M. (1984). Early years of the Colonial Development Corporation: British state enterprise overseas during late colonialism. African Affairs, 83(330), 63-75.
- Cowen, M. (1981).'Notes on the Nairobi Discussion of the Agrarian Problem', Review of African Political Economy, No. 20, 1981.
- Cowen, M. (1984).'Traditions of Populism', Economy and Society, 13 (1)
- Cowen, M. (1986). 'Change in State Power, International Conditions and Peasant Producers: the case of Kenya', The Journal of Development Studies, 22 (2),
- Cowen, M. (1989).'Before and after Mau Mau in Kenya' (Review Article), The Journal of Peasant Studies, 16 (2), January
- Cowen, M. and R.W. Shenton, (1996) Doctrines of Development, London: Routledge, 554 pp.
- Cowen, M. and S. MacWilliam, Indigenous Capital in Kenya: The 'Indian'Dimension of Debate, Interkont Books 8, Institute of Development Studies, University of Helsinki, 1996,245 pp
