= International Society of Exposure Science =

- Abbreviation: ISES
- Formation: 1990
- Type: Non-profit Scientific Society
- Purpose: "To better our world, its ecosystems, and inhabitants, by creating an international community that advances and integrates exposure science into research and action."
- Headquarters: Overland Park, KS USA
- Region served: Worldwide
- Members: over 400
- Website: https://intlexposurescience.org/

The International Society of Exposure Science (ISES), (formally known as the International Society of Exposure Analysis (ISEA)) is a non-profit organization established in 1990 by a group of scientists and engineers, including Paul Lioy. The formation of this society was at least partially in response to a National Research Committee (NRC) on Exposure Assessment that held a series of meetings and workshops beginning in 1987 that formed the foundation of exposure science and defined basic principles. The expertise of members in ISES is interdisciplinary and draws upon a broad array of disciplines, including: exposure assessment; biochemistry; risk assessment; bioinformatics; physiology; toxicology; epidemiology; ecology; environmental chemistry; and environmental engineering. The Society’s membership is professionally diverse and includes academic, governmental, and private sector scientists, as well as policy makers who have a common interest in exposure science. ISES has operated with a President, President-elect, Treasurer, and Secretary as well as Councilors. Councilors are elected from the membership and are allocated from the various professional categories that represent Society membership (academia, government, private sector, and students). The first set of Bylaws was approved by the membership in 1991.

ISES hosts an annual conference and is associated with a scientific journal (the Journal of Exposure Science and Environmental Epidemiology, JESEE). The society often partners with other international societies when hosting an annual conference. In 2018, the annual conference was held in Ottawa, Canada with the International Society for Environmental Epidemiology (ISEE) and received attention from NIEHS for the broad range of topics to be highlighted at the conference from E-waste to natural disasters. In 2019, ISES partnered with the International Society for Indoor Air Quality (ISIAQ), and the conference was held in Lithuania focusing on air pollution and associated impacts on the built, natural, and social environments.

== Awards ==
In past years, ISES has developed several awards within the organization. These include the Jerome J. Wesolowski Award for contributions to the knowledge and practice of human exposure assessment, the Joan M. Daisey Outstanding Young Scientist Award, which recognizes a young scientist in exposure science whose degree was conferred within the past 10 years, and the Constance L. Mehlman Award which recognizes contributions in exposure analysis that helped shape a national or state policy or that provided new approaches for reduction or prevention of exposures. Lastly, the Distinguished Lecturer Award was developed in recognition of an individual within the field who promotes the mission and goals of the ISES organization.
