= Ivar Stokke =

Norwegian sport wrestler

Ivar Gunnar Stokke (26 January 1911 – 22 July 1993) was a Norwegian sport wrestler who competed in the 1936 Summer Olympics.

He was born in Kristiansund, but represented the sports club SK av 1909. He participated in the bantamweight class in wrestling at the 1936 Summer Olympics, where he was eliminated after the third round. He also won a bronze medal at the 1939 European Wrestling Championships. Stokke was a railway worker by trade.

During the Second World War German occupation of Norway, Stokke was arrested twice by the Germans in 1943. In the first instance he was arrested on 23 March 1943 and imprisoned first at Åkebergveien, then Møllergata 19, before being released on 28 May 1943. Rearrested on 1 July 1943, he was held at Møllergata 19, before being transferred to Grini concentration camp on 17 July 1943 and issued prisoner number 12164. Stokke was later deported to Germany, spending time in captivity in Hamburg, Kiel and Lübeck, before being transferred back to Norway and released on 24 December 1944.
