= Márton Lőrincz =

Hungarian wrestler (1911–1969)

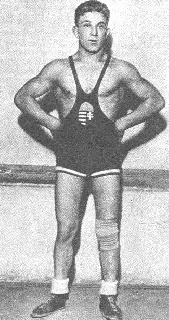
- Lőrincz in 1936

Personal information
- Born: October 28, 1911 Corund, Romania
- Died: August 1, 1969 (aged 57) San Carlos de Bariloche, Argentina
Medal record
Men's Greco-Roman wrestling
Representing Hungary
Olympic Games
Gold medal – first place	1936 Berlin	Bantamweight

Márton Lõrincz (28 October 1911 – 1 August 1969) was a Hungarian wrestler and Olympic champion in Greco-Roman wrestling.

== Olympics ==
Lõrincz competed at the 1936 Summer Olympics in Berlin where he received a gold medal in Greco-Roman wrestling in the bantamweight class.
