= Peter G. Traber =

American business executive

Peter George Traber is an American pharmaceutical company executive. He is the Chief Medical Officer for Selecta Biosciences. https://selectabio.com/ He has been the president and chief executive officer of Baylor College of Medicine (BCM) and the John and Clara Whitmore Professor of Medicine. Traber succeeded Ralph Feigin to become the fourth president of BCM in March 2003, and was president until November 2008. Prior to joining Baylor, he served as Senior Vice President for Clinical Development & Medical Affairs and Chief Medical Officer at GlaxoSmithKline. Prior to that, Traber held positions as Chief Executive Officer of the University of Pennsylvania Health System and interim Dean, Chair of the Department of Internal Medicine for the University of Pennsylvania School of Medicine, Chief of Gastroenterology at the University of Pennsylvania School of Medicine, and faculty member at the University of Michigan School of Medicine. He received his undergraduate degree B.S. in Chemical Engineering at the University of Michigan in 1977, his M.D. from Wayne State Medical School in Michigan in 1981, and he trained as a gastroenterologist, after completing an internal medicine residency at Northwestern University School of Medicine in Chicago.

In 2003, Traber was elected Fellow of the American Association for the Advancement of Science and is a member of the American Society for Clinical Investigation. In 1999, Traber received the Distinguished Alumnus Award from Wayne State University School of Medicine and in 2006 he was honored with the American Gastroenterological Association outstanding Service Award.

In Houston, Traber serves on several boards including BCM Technologies, BioHouston, the Federal Reserve Bank of Dallas (Houston Branch), the Greater Houston Partnership, the Houston Technology Center, and the National Space Biomedical Research Institute.

== College president's pay ==
According to a New York Times article on November 20, 2006, Traber was one of the highest paid college presidents with an annual pay of over $1.3 million.
