= John Dennis (Missouri politician) =

American politician

John Clint Dennis (July 31, 1917 – February 15, 2000) was an American politician from the state of Missouri. Born in Patton, Missouri, he was sheriff of Scott County, Missouri from 1951 until 1976. In 1963, he was elected president of the Missouri Sheriffs' Association. He later served as a Democrat in the Missouri Senate from 1976 until 1992. He served as a marine during World War II. He died in Cape Girardeau, Missouri.
