= Gérard Rousset (fencer) =

French fencer

Personal information
- Full name: Gérard Georges Victor Rousset
- Born: 9 April 1921 Valence, France
- Died: 3 February 2000 (aged 78) Vesoul, France

Sport
- Sport: Fencing

Gérard Georges Victor Rousset (9 April 1921 – 3 February 2000) was a French fencer. He competed in the team épée event at the 1952 Summer Olympics.
