= Victor Ivanovich Alyabyev =

Russian scientist in the field of forest industry

Victor Ivanovich Alyabyev Виктор Иванович Алябьев
- Born: 5 November 1921; Shatsk
- Died: 4 February 2000 (aged 78); Khimki
- Education: Moscow Power Engineering Institute; Moscow State Forest University
- Scientific career
- Fields: forest industry

Victor Ivanovich Alyabyev (Russian: Виктор Иванович Алябьев; 5 November 1921 – 4 February 2000) was a Soviet and Russian scientist in the field of Forest industry, professor and a member of the Russian Academy of Natural Sciences.

== Biography ==
He was born in 1921 in the Ryazvna province, he was the thirteenth child in the family.

In his youth he worked in Moscow on the construction of the Underground. Then he worked in Kiev and in the Moscow region. In 1939 he entered the Leningrad Electrotechnical Institute, but a month after the start of his studies he had to join the Red Army.

As a participant in the Great Patriotic War, a front-line chauffeur, he celebrated the victory in Berlin. He was awarded orders and medals.

In 1946 Viktor Alyabyev enrolled in the Moscow Power Engineering Institute, later enrolled in the engineering department of the Moscow Forestry Engineering Institute. After graduating from the institute, he worked in it as a lecturer.

In 1974 he was awarded the title of professor. In 1987, with the support of the Ministry of Forestry of the USSR, the USSR established a branch laboratory for the management of forest transport and construction of logging roads at the department.

In 1989 he was awarded the title of Honored Scientist of the RSFSR, In 1995 he was elected a full member (academician) of the Russian Academy of Natural Sciences.

== Literature ==
- Alyabyev V.I. Centralized power supply of logging enterprises: Index of literature for management. and engineer-techn. workers. - M-in the forest industry of the USSR: TsNTB, 1954
- Alyabyev V.I. Timber loading and unloading machines and stacking machines: Basis for production and technical calculations. - Moscow: Forest Industry, 1968.
- Alyabyev V.I. Mathematical modeling and optimization of production processes in logging operations: Proc. manual for students of FPKP and students of special. 0901 and 0519. Moscow: MLTI.-Part 1 - 1979; Part 2 - 1982.
- Alyabyev V.I., Kuryanov V.K., Kharin V.N. Organization of automated management of timber industry. - Voronezh: VGLTA, 1999.
