= 1983–84 FC Zürich season =

FC Zürich
1983–84 season
- Owner: Alfred Zweidler
- Chairman: Alfred Zweidler
- Head coach: Hans Kodric
- Stadium: Letzigrund
- Nationalliga A: 12th
- Swiss Cup: Quarter-finals
- 1983–84 UEFA Cup: Round 1
- 1983 Intertoto Cup: 3rd in group
- Top goalscorer: League: Markus Schneider (10); All: Markus Schneider (12)

The 1983–84 season was FC Zürich's 87th season in their existence, since their foundation in 1896. It was their 25th consecutive season in the top flight of Swiss football, following their promotion at the end of the 1957–58 season. They played their home games in the Letzigrund. The stadium is located in the west of Zurich in the Altstetten district, about three kilometers from the city center.

== Overview ==
The club's owner and chairman at this time was Alfred Zweidler. Hans Kodric was appointed as the new head-coach. FCZ first team competed in the domestic first-tier 1983–84 Nationalliga A and they also competed in 1983–84 Swiss Cup. As fourth placed team in the last season the team had qualified for 1983–84 UEFA Cup. They also entered the 1983 Intertoto Cup.

FCZ started the season quite well. However, in the later stages of the autumn season and following a bad spell, as the team was defeated seven times in nine games, coach Kodric was sacked. Köbi Kuhn, who since 1979 was in charge of the FCZ youth set-up, was appointed for the second time as caretaker manager. This until the end of the season and he was able to keep the team above the relegation zone.

== Players ==
The following is the list of the FCZ first team squad this season. It also includes players that were in the squad the day the domestic league season started, on 9 August 1983, but subsequently left the club after that date.

Note: Flags indicate national team as defined under FIFA eligibility rules; some limited exceptions apply. Players may hold more than one non-FIFA nationality.

No.	Pos.	Nation	Player
1	GK	SUI	Karl Grob (league games: 24)
—	GK	SUI	Hermann Rufli (league games: 6)
—	DF	SUI	Fritz Baur (league games: 26)
—	DF	GER	Gerhard Bold (league games: 25)
—	DF	SUI	Urs Fischer (league games: 2)
—	DF	SUI	Roland Häusermann (league games: 16)
—	DF	SUI	Ruedi Landolt (league games: 29)
—	DF	SUI	Heinz Lüdi (league games: 23)
—	DF	SUI	Urs Schönenberger (league games: 21)
—	DF	SUI	Peter Stoll (league games: 12)

No.	Pos.	Nation	Player
—	DF	SUI	Gianpietro Zappa (league games: 12)
—	MF	ITA	Roberto Di Muro (league games: 4)
—	MF	SUI	Walter Iselin (league games: 19)
—	MF	YUG	Jurica Jerković (league games: 27)
—	MF	SUI	Roger Kundert (league games: 19)
—	MF	SUI	David Mautone (league games: 10)
—	FW	SUI	Massimo Alliata (league games: 19)
—	FW	SUI	Ruedi Elsener (league games: 24)
—	FW	NZL	Wynton Rufer (league games: 22)
—	FW	SUI	Markus Schneider (league games: 25)
—	FW	SUI	Antonio Paradiso (league games: 3)

Players who left the squad

Note: Flags indicate national team as defined under FIFA eligibility rules; some limited exceptions apply. Players may hold more than one non-FIFA nationality.

No.	Pos.	Nation	Player
—	DF	SUI	Bruno Misteli (to Baden)
—	DF	SUI	René Ruch (to FC Zug)
—	DF	NZL	Shane Rufer (to Lugano)
—	DF	SUI	Thomas Staub (to Aarau)
—	DF	SUI	Ruedi Zahner (to FC Zug)

No.	Pos.	Nation	Player
—	MF	SUI	Daniel Jeandupeux (as manager to Toulouse)
—	FW	SUI	Erni Maissen (returned to Basel)
—	FW	SUI	Walter Seiler (to Aarau)
—	FW	SUI	Hans-Peter Zwicker (to Lausanne-Sport)

== Results ==
Legend

Win Draw Loss Postponed

=== Nationalliga A ===
==== League matches ====
9 August 1983 Round 1	**Zürich**	**2–1**	**Aarau**	Letzigrund, Zürich
20:00	Rufer 49' (1:1); Iselin (yellow card) 55'; Schneider 57' (1:0)	FCZ summary FCA summary	39' (0:1) Seiler; (yellow card) 63' Schär	Attendance: 6,500; Referee: (Switzerland) Georges Sandoz (Corcelles-Cormondrèche, Neuchâtel)

13 August 1983 Round 2	**Servette**	**5–3**	**Zürich**	Charmilles Stadium, Geneva
20:30	Barberis 16' (1:0); Schnyder 27' (2:0); Barberis 36' (3:0); Schnyder 43' (4:0); Geiger 69' (5:2)	FCZ summary	45' (4:1) Rufer; (yellow card) 57' Rufer; 67' (4:2) Jerković; 78' (5:3) Schönenberger	Attendance: 7,500; Referee: (Switzerland) Bruno Galler (Kirchdorf, Bern)

20 August 1983 Round 3	**Zürich**	**5–1**	**Chiasso**	Letzigrund, Zürich
20:00	Rufer 5' (1:0); Zappa 15' (pen.); Kundert (yellow card) 29'; Schneider 39' (3:1); Schneider 65' (4:1); Jerković (yellow card) 67'; Schneider 74' (5:1)	FCZ summary	12' (1:1) Tami; (yellow card) 55' Mastrodonato; (yellow card) 79' Kalbermatter	Attendance: 2,800; Referee: (Switzerland) Othmar Winter, (Martigny)

23 August 1983 Round 4	**La Chaux-de-Fonds**	**2–2**	**Zürich**	Stade Charrière, La Chaux-de-Fonds
20:00	Nogués 52' (1:2); Matthey 62' (2:2)	FCZ summary	(yellow card) 17' Schönenberger; 21' (0:1) Elsener; 24' (0:2) Schönenberger	Attendance: 5,500; Referee: (Switzerland) Werner Liebi (Thun)

27 August 1983 Round 5	**Zürich**	**1–0**	**Lausanne-Sport**	Letzigrund, Zürich
20:00	Iselin 79' (1:0)	FCZ summary		Attendance: 5,200; Referee: (Switzerland) Alfred Heinis (Ammannsegg, Biberist)

3 September 1983 Round 6	**Grasshopper Club**	**1–0**	**Zürich**	Hardturm, Zürich
20:00	Ponte 53' (1:0)	FCZ summary	(yellow card) 87' Häusermann	Attendance: 15,800; Referee: (Switzerland) Gottlieb Barmettler (Luzern)

17 September 1983 Round 7	**Zürich**	**2–1**	**Basel**	Letzigrund, Zürich
20:00	Jerković 13' (1:1); Landolt (yellow card) 33'; Rufer 75' (2:1)	FCZ summary FCB summary	3' (0:1) Sutter; (yellow card) 81' Zbinden	Attendance: 6,500; Referee: (Switzerland) André Daina (Éclépens)
Note: Corners 6:3.

23 September 1983 Round 8	**Wettingen**	**4–3**	**Zürich**	Stadion Altenburg, Wettingen
20:00	Radaković 14' (pen.); Bold (yellow card) 13'; Peterhans 34' (2:1); Traber 57' (3:3); Röthlisberger 65' (4:3); Schönenberger (yellow card)	FCZ summary	10' (0:1) Baur; 39' (2:2) Schneider; 55' (2:3) Schneider	Attendance: 4,300; Referee: (Switzerland) Georges Sandoz (Corcelles-Cormondrèche, Neuchâtel)

1 October 1983 Round 9	**Zürich**	**0–4**	**Sion**	Letzigrund, Zürich
20:00	Bold (yellow card) 68'	FCZ summary	(yellow card) 4' Valentini; 24' (0:1) Bregy; 35' (0:2) Luisier; 48' (0:3) Ben Brahim; (yellow card) 59' Ben Brahim; 89' (0:4) Rössli	Attendance: 4,300; Referee: (Switzerland) Renzo Peduzzi (Roveredo)
Note: 66' Rufer's handball goal is disallowed after consultation between the referee and the linesman.

4 October 1983 Round 10	**Bellinzona**	**2–2**	**Zürich**	Stadio Comunale, Bellinzona
	Tedeschi 15' (1:1); Schär 75' (2:2)	FCZ summary	4' (0:1) Schneider; 29' (1:2) Schneider	Attendance: 2,000; Referee: (Switzerland) Othmar Winter, (Martigny)

22 October 1983 Round 11	**Xamax**	**2–1**	**Zürich**	Stade de la Maladière, Neuchâtel
18:15	Zaugg 20' (1:0); Sarrasin (yellow card) 40'; Küffer 55' (2:0)	FCZ summary	(yellow card) 40' Iselin; (yellow card) 44' Lüdi; 86' (2:1) Rufer	Attendance: 6,300; Referee: (Switzerland) Bruno Galler (Kirchdorf, Bern)

30 October 1983 Round 12	**Zürich**	**0–1**	**Young Boys**	Letzigrund, Zürich
15:00	Landolt (yellow card) 80'; Baur (yellow card) 82'	FCZ summary	31' (0:1) Nickel; Feuz (yellow card) 74'	Attendance: 5,000; Referee: (Switzerland) Kurt Röthlisberger (Aarau)
Note: FCZ goal in the 60th minute disallowed due to a foul on the goalkeeper.

12 November 1983 Round 13	**St. Gallen**	**2–0**	**Zürich**	Espenmoos, St. Gallen
	Sengör 17' (1:0); Gisinger 84' (pen.)	FCZ summary	(yellow card) 69' Schönenberger	Attendance: 6,800; Referee: (Switzerland) Gottlieb Barmettler (Luzern)
Note: Lüdi's act of violence against Bischofberger (kicking the lying opponent on the shin) was not seen by the referee.

20 November 1983 Round 14	**Vevey-Sports**	**4–1**	**Zürich**	Stade de Copet, Vevey
14:30	Franz 32' (pen.); Diserens 39' (2:0); Diserens 68' (3:0); Jacobacci 78' (4:0)	FCZ summary	(yellow card) 75' Lüdi; 80' (4:1) Schneider	Attendance: 3,400; Referee: (Switzerland) Alfred Heinis (Ammannsegg, Biberist)
Note: 85th minute: Schönenberger elbowed Débonnaire, which was not seen by the linesman.

27 November 1983 Round 15	**Zürich**	**1–0**	**Luzern**	Letzigrund, Zürich
15:30	Schönenberger 39' (1:0)	FCZ summary		Attendance: 5,800; Referee: (Switzerland) André Daina (Éclépens)
Note: The game started 30 minutes late because referee Daina was stuck en route due to a storm.

26 February 1984 Round 16	**Luzern**	**1–0**	**Zürich**	Stadion Allmend, Luzern
14:30	Lauscher 35' (1:0); Wildisen (yellow card) 63'	FCZ summary	(yellow card) 72' Iselin	Attendance: 7,500; Referee: (Switzerland) Georges Sandoz (Corcelles-Cormondrèche, Neuchâtel)

4 March 1984 Round 17	**Zürich**	**P–P**	**Vevey-Sports**	Letzigrund, Zürich
20:00
Note: Pitch unplayable.

11 March 1984 Round 18	**Zürich**	**0–0**	**St. Gallen**	Letzigrund, Zürich
15:00		FCZ summary		Attendance: 6,200; Referee: (Switzerland) Claude Gachoud (Rolle)

14 March 1984 Round 17	**Zürich**	**3–0**	**Vevey-Sports**	Letzigrund, Zürich
20:00	Jerković 37' (1:0); Kundert 60' (2:0); Bold 85' (3:0)	FCZ summary		Attendance: 2,000; Referee: (Switzerland) Ulrich Nyffenegger (Nidau)
Note: Postponed match from 4 March 1984 because pitch was unplayable.

18 March 1984 Round 19	**Young Boys**	**0–0**	**Zürich**	Wankdorf Stadium, Bern
14:30	Gertschen (yellow card) 78'	FCZ summary	(yellow card) 57' Stoll	Attendance: 5,000; Referee: (Switzerland) Kurt Röthlisberger (Aarau)
Note: Landolt honoured for 150 league games.

24 March 1984 Round 20	**Zürich**	**1–1**	**Xamax**	Letzigrund, Zürich
20:00	Rufer 76' (1:1); Zappa (yellow card) 77'	FCZ summary	(yellow card) 45' Bianchi; 74' (0:1) Lüthi	Attendance: 4,300; Referee: (Switzerland) Walter Nussbaumer (Crans-près-Céligny)

4 April 1984 Round 21	**Zürich**	**2–1**	**Bellinzona**	Letzigrund, Zürich
20:15	Baur (yellow card) 45'; Bold 47' (1:0); Jerković 56' (2:0); Rufer (yellow card) 90'	FCZ summary	(yellow card) 47' Weidle; 86' (2:1) Cerutti	Attendance: 1,800; Referee: (Switzerland) Charles-Henri Morex (Bex)

7 April 1984 Round 22	**Sion**	**6–1**	**Zürich**	Stade Tourbillon, Sion
20:15	Cina 2' (1:0); Bonvin 27' (2:1); Cina 40' (3:1); Cina 61' (4:1); Bonvin 76' (5:1); Bonvin 79' (6:1)	FCZ summary	(yellow card) 8' Kundert; 26' (1:1) Stoll	Attendance: 7,000; Referee: (Switzerland) Franz Gächter (Aarau, Suhr, Aargau)

15 April 1984 Round 23	**Zürich**	**0–2**	**Wettingen**	Letzigrund, Zürich
15:00	Iselin (yellow card) 60'	FCZ summary	43' (0:1) Peterhans; (red card) 44' Traber; 70' (0:2) Schneider	Attendance: 4,100; Referee: (Switzerland) Jean-Marie Macheret, (Rueyres-St-Laurent)

28 April 1984 Round 24	**Basel**	**3–0**	**Zürich**	St. Jakob Stadium, Basel
20:00	Sutter 3' (1:0); Zbinden 5' (2:0); Nadig 22' (3:0)	Summary		Attendance: 7,000; Referee: (Switzerland) Bruno Galler (Kirchdorf, Bern)

5 May 1984 Round 25	**Zürich**	**3–2**	**Grasshopper Club**	Letzigrund, Zürich
20:00	Häusermann 18' (1:0); Mautone (yellow card) 25'; Jerković 60' (2:1); Rufer 64' (3:1)	FCZ summary	29' (1:1) Koller; 79' (3:2) Hermann	Attendance: 15,000; Referee: (Switzerland) Ulrich Nyffenegger (Nidau)

12 May 1984 Round 26	**Lausanne-Sport**	**1–1**	**Zürich**	Olympique de la Pontaise, Lausanne
20:30	Hertig 17' (1:0)	FCZ summary	25' (1:1) Rufer; (yellow card) 83' Schönenberger	Attendance: 3,600; Referee: (Switzerland) Rolf Blattmann (Zeiningen)

15 May 1984 Round 27	**Zürich**	**1–1**	**La Chaux-de-Fonds**	Letzigrund, Zürich
20:00	Kundert 28' (1:0)	FCZ summary	86' (og. 1:1) (Di Muro)	Attendance: 1,800; Referee: (Switzerland) Othmar Winter, (Martigny)

19 May 1984 Round 28	**Chiasso**	**3–3**	**Zürich**	Stadio Comunale Riva IV, Chiasso
20:30	Werner 15' (1:1); Sordelli (yellow card) 33'; Ceccaroni 48' (2:2); Werner 58' (3:3)	FCZ summary	5' (pen.) Kundert; 31' (2:1) Jerković; 53' (2:3) Schneider	Attendance: 300; Referee: (Switzerland) Philippe Mercier (Pully)

2 Junw 1984 Round 29	**Zürich**	**0–1**	**Servette**	Letzigrund, Zürich
20:00	Baur (yellow card) 75'; Lüdi (penalty missed) 78′	FCZ summary	34' (0:1) Barberis	Attendance: 7,500; Referee: (Switzerland) Charles-Henri Morex (Bex)
Note: 78' Burgener holds Lüdi's penalty.

6 Juni 1984 Round 30	**Aarau**	**4–1**	**Zürich**	Stadion Brügglifeld, Aarau
	Seiler 24' (1:0); Seiler 40' (2:0); Hegi 64' (3:1); Müller 76' (4:1)	FCZ summary FCA summary	55' (2:1) Di Muro	Attendance: 3,300; Referee: (Switzerland) Othmar Winter, (Martigny)

==== Final league table ====
Pos	Team	Pld	W	D	L	GF	GA	GD	Pts	Qualification
1	Grasshopper Club	30	19	6	5	59	32	+27	44	**Championship play-off winners,** qualified for 1984–85 European Cup
2	Servette	30	19	6	5	67	31	+36	44	Championship play-off loosers **Swiss Cup winners,** qualified for 1984–85 Cup Winners' Cup
3	Sion	30	18	7	5	74	39	+35	43	qualified for 1984–85 UEFA Cup
4	Xamax	30	15	10	5	54	27	+27	40	qualified for 1984–85 UEFA Cup
5	St. Gallen	30	16	8	6	57	41	+16	40	entered 1984 Intertoto Cup
6	Lausanne-Sport	30	13	8	9	49	37	+12	34	
7	La Chaux-de-Fonds	30	12	9	9	52	47	+5	33	
8	Wettingen	30	12	6	12	43	43	0	30	entered 1984 Intertoto Cup
9	Basel	30	11	6	13	55	59	−4	28	
10	Aarau	30	9	9	12	50	42	+8	27	
11	Young Boys	30	8	9	13	39	40	−1	25	
12	**Zürich**	30	8	8	14	39	56	−17	24	entered 1984 Intertoto Cup
13	Vevey-Sports	30	9	6	15	43	65	−22	24	
14	Luzern	30	9	4	17	35	52	−17	22	entered 1984 Intertoto Cup
15	Bellinzona	30	4	4	22	30	79	−49	12	Relegated to 1984–85 Nationalliga B
16	Chiasso	30	4	2	24	26	82	−56	10	Relegated to 1984–85 Nationalliga B

Source: rsssf.com
Rules for classification: 1) Points; 2) Goal difference within the league, but decider play-off for qualifiers;

=== Swiss Cup ===
10 September 1983 Round 3	**Ibach**	**1–5** (a.e.t.)	**Zürich**	Gerbihof, Ibach
	Waltenspühl 37'; Büeler (yellow card) 85'; Ruhstaller (yellow card) 104'	FCZ summary	50' (o.g.) Schmidig; 101' Bold; 105' Bold; 110' Bold; 116' Rufer; (yellow card) 104' Rufer	Attendance: 1,300; Referee: (Switzerland) Arturo Martino (Neukirch an der Thur)
Note: Ibach spielte in der Saison 1983/84 in der 1. Liga (third-tier).

16 October 1983 Round 4	**Baden**	**1–3**	**Zürich**	Esp Stadium, Fislisbach
16:00	Hadewicz 6' (1:1)	FCZ summary	1' (0:1) Bold; 48' (1:2) Lüdi; (yellow card) 52' Landolt (1:3) Schneider	Attendance: 2,200; Referee: (Switzerland) Alfred Heinis (Ammannsegg, Biberist)

1 April 1984 Round 5	**Zürich**	**5–1**	**Wettingen**	Letzigrund, Zürich
15:00	Elsener 12' (1:0); Graf 21' (o.g.); Jerković 32' (3:0); Lüdi 45' (pen.); Rufer 72' (5:1)	FCZ summary	41' (pen.) Radaković	Attendance: 3,500; Referee: (Switzerland) Manfred Schlup (Grenchen)
Note: Trauerminute für Bundesrat Ritschard

23 April 1984 Quarter-final	**Lausanne-Sport**	**3–2** (a.e.t.)	**Zürich**	Pontaise, Lausanne
15:00	Andrey 24' (1:2); Andrey 27' (2:2); Andrey 111' (3:2)	FCZ summary	10' (0:1) Jerković; 22' (0:2) Jerković; (yellow card) 63' Jerković; (yellow card) 104' Baur	Attendance: 15,000; Referee: (Switzerland) Renzo Peduzzi (Roveredo)

=== UEFA Cup ===
14 September 1983 First round 1st leg	**FC Zürich (Switzerland)**	**1–4**	**(Belgium) Royal Antwerp**	Letzigrund, Zürich
20:00	Baur 28' (1:2)	UEFA report FCZ summary	Pétursson 13' (0:1); Pétursson 17' (0:2); Cnops (yellow card) 79'; Pétursson 88' (1:3); Cnops 90+1' (1:4)	Attendance: 6,350; Referee: Miklós Nagy (Hungary)

27 September 1983 First round return leg	**Royal Antwerp (Belgium)**	**4–2**	**(Switzerland) FC Zürich**	Bosuilstadion, Antwerp
20:00	Fazekas 50' (pen. 1:0); Petrović 74' (2:1); Van Der Linden 76' (3:1); Fazekas 84' (4:2)	UEFA rport FCZ summary	Landolt 69' (1:1); Rufer 80' (3:2)	Attendance: 12,500; Referee: Howard King (Wales)

Royal Antwerp won 8–3 on aggregate.

=== Intertoto Cup ===
==== Group 1 matches ====
Matches

2 July 1983 Round 1	**Fortuna Düsseldorf (West Germany)**	**2–2**	**(Switzerland) Zürich**	Ratingen
	Wenzel 27' (1:1) (Baur) 48' (o.g.)	FCZ summary	26' (0:1) Alliata; 75' (pen.) Zappa; (yellow card) Schönenberger; (yellow card) Stoll	Attendance: 4,000; Referee: (West Germany) Ahlenfelder

7 July 1983 Round 2	**Twente (Netherlands)**	**1–1**	**(Switzerland) Zürich**	Diekman Stadion, Enschede
	Ashcroft 87' (1:1)	FCZ summary Twente report	77' (0:1) Elsener	Attendance: 4,000; Referee: (Netherlands) Jan Manuel

9 July 1983 Round 3	**Standard Liège (Belgium)**	**3–0**	**(Switzerland) Zürich**	Stade de Sclessin, Liège
	Plessers 57' (1:0); Tahamata 86' (2:0); Daerden 89' (3:0)	FCZ summary	(yellow card) Kundert	Attendance: 6,000; Referee: (Belgium) Richard Magerat

16 July 1983 Round 4	**Zürich (Switzerland)**	**3–4**	**(Netherlands) Twente**	Letzigrund, Zürich
	Jerković 3' (1:0); Kundert (yellow card) 7'; Zappa 28' (2:0); Bold 31' (3:1)	FCZ summary Twente report	30' (2:1) Birkedal; (yellow card) 42' Plasmans; 58' (3:2) Rutten; 77' (3:3) Roord; 83' (3:4) Plasmans	Attendance: 1,800; Referee: (Switzerland) Rudolf Renggli (Stans/Luzern)

23 July 1983 Round 5	**Zürich (Switzerland)**	**5–2**	**(West Germany) Fortuna Düsseldorf**	Letzigrund, Zürich
	Bold 16' (1:0); Bold 28' (2:1); Alliata 49' (3:1); Alliata 51' (4:2); Landolt 89' (5:2)	FCZ summary	24' (1:1) Bockenfeld; 51' (4:2) Eðvaldsson; (yellow card) 88' Dusend	Attendance: 1,700; Referee: (Switzerland) Franz Gächter (Aarau / Suhr)

27 July 1983 Round 6	**Zürich (Switzerland)**	**2–1**	**(Belgium) Standard Liège**	Letzigrund, Zürich
	Bold 48' (1:0); Schneider 79' (2:0)	FCZ summary	(yellow card) 35' Delangre; (yellow card) 36' Bosman; (yellow card) 79' Preud'homme; 87' (2:1) Wintacq	Attendance: 2,700; Referee: (Switzerland) Jakob Baumann (Schaffhausen)
Note: Standard goalkeeper Preud'homme substituted in as a field player!

==== Final group table ====
Pos	Team	Pld	W	D	L	GF	GA	GD	Pts	TWE	STA	ZÜR	DÜS
1	(Netherlands) Twente	6	4	1	1	14	10	+4	**9**	—	2–0	1–1	1–0
2	(Belgium) Standard Liège	6	4	0	2	13	9	+4	**8**	4–2	—	3–0	4–3
3	(Switzerland) **Zürich**	6	2	2	2	13	13	0	**6**	3–4	2–1	—	5–2
4	(West Germany) Fortuna Düsseldorf	6	0	1	5	9	17	−8	**1**	2–4	0–1	2–2	—

Source: mogiel.net
Rules for classification: 1) Points; 2) Goal difference; 3) Goals scored; 4) Head-to-head points; 5) Away goals scored; 6) Draw.

=== Friendly matches ===
==== Pre- and mid-season ====
3 July 1983 Pre-season	**Basel**	**1–2**	**Zürich**	Linden, Gunzwil
15:30	Sutter 9' (1:0)	FCZ summary Summary	18' (1:1) Iselin; 88' (1:2) Bold	Attendance: 1,000 bis 1,500; Referee: (Switzerland) Rudolf Renggli (Stans and Luzern)

29 July 1983 Uhrencup	**Biel-Bienne**	**3–4**	**Zürich**	Stadion Brühl, Grenchen
	Vöhringer 28' (1:0); Büttiker 62' (2:2); Uva 82' (3:2)	FCZ summary	38' (1:1) Schneider; 49' (1:2) Rufer; Stoll (yellow card) 51'; 88' (3:3) Bold; 89' (3:4) Bold	Attendance: 1,100
Note: Semi-final of the annual Uhrencup

31 July 1983 Exhibition game	**Zürich**	**3–5**	**1. FC Nürnberg**	Sportplatz Wiggis, Netstal
	Elsener 5' (1:0); Schneider 73' (2:5); Bold 89' (3:5)	FCZ summary	10' (1:1) Burgsmüller; 13' (1:2) Dreßel; 25' (1:3) Dreßel; 28' (1:4) Lottermann; 51' (1:5) Dreßel	Attendance: 1,600; Referee: (Switzerland) Willi Jaus (Feldmeilen)
Note: Match as part of the opening ceremony of the Wiggis sports field.

4 August 1983 Uhrencup	**Basel**	**1–0**	**Zürich**	Stadion Brühl, Grenchen
20:00	Maradan 60' (pen.)	FCZ summary Summary		Attendance: 3,400; Referee: (Switzerland) Werner Liebi (Thun)
Note: Final of the annual Uhrencup. Federal Councillor Willi Ritschard was among the guests of honor.

8 November 1983 Mid-season	**Zürich**	**3–0**	**SC Freiburg**	Letzigrund, Zürich
	Mautone 13' (1:0); Schneider 31' (2:0); Jerković 65' (3:0)	FCZ summary		Attendance: 300; Referee: (Switzerland) Willi Jaus (Feldmeilen)

==== Winter break ====
25 January 1984 Exhibition game	**Maghreb of Fez**	**2–0**	**Zürich**	Fez Stadium
	Behonji 60' (1:0); Aziz 74' (2:0)	FCZ summary	(yellow card) Bold	Attendance: 10,000; Referee: Bahhou (Fez, Morocco)
Note: A farewell match for Guezzar. The friendly was broadcast live on Moroccan television.

28 January 1984 Exhibition game	**Wydad AC**	**1–1**	**Zürich**	Casablanca
	Bregga 83' (1:1)	FCZ summary	81' (1:0) Elsener; (yellow card) Jerković	Attendance: 4,000; Referee: (Morocco) Feshi (Rabat)

2 Februar 1984 Exhibition game	**Tihad AS**	**0–4**	**Zürich**	Casablanca
		FCZ summary	5' (0:1) Schneider; 7' (0:2) Schneider; 22' (0:3) Elsener; 43' (0:4) Jerković; (yellow card) Baur; (yellow card) Zappa	Attendance: 300; Referee: (Morocco) Sabri (Casablanca)

11 February 1984 Exhibition game	**Lugano**	**1–3**	**Zürich**	Cornaredo, Lugano
	Roncari 7' (1:0)	FCZ summary	8' (1:1) Schneider; 85' (1:2) Schneider; 86' (pen.) Lüdi	Attendance: 100; Referee: (Switzerland) Francesco Bianchi (Chiasso)

11 Februar 1984 Exhibition game	**Chiasso**	**2–2**	**Zürich**	Stadio Comunale Riva IV, Chiasso
	Werner 8' (1:0); Tami 80' (2:2)	FCZ summary	48' (1:1) Schneider; 63' (1:2) Jerković	Attendance: 300; Referee: (Switzerland) Marco Raveglia (San Vittore)

15 February 1984 Exhibition game	**Aarau**	**5–2**	**Zürich**	Stadion Brügglifeld, Aarau
	Osterwalder 25' (1:0); Rietmann 27' (2:0); Marti 30' (3:0); Kaltaveridis 47' (4:1); Marti 79' (5:2)	FCZ summary	44' (3:1) Lüdi; 63' (4:2) Jerković	Attendance: 400; Referee: (Switzerland) Bruno Galler (Kirchdorf, Bern)

18 February 1984 Exhibition game	**Baden**	**2–2**	**Zürich**	Esp Stadium, Fislisbach
	Zimmermann 83' (pen.); Würmli 87' (2:2)	FCZ summary	4' (0:1) Schneider; 8' (0:2) Elsener	Attendance: 200; Referee: (Switzerland) Willi Jaus (Feldmeilen)

7 March 1984 Mid season	**SC Zug**	**2–3**	**Zürich**	Herti Allmend Stadion, Zug
	Wieczorek 24' (1:1); Wieczorek 33' (pen.)	FCZ summary	5' (0:1) Lüdi; 55' (o.g.); 83' (2:3) Alliata	Attendance: 100; Referee: (Switzerland) Gottlieb Barmettler (Luzern)

== Sources ==
- dbFCZ Homepage
- Switzerland 1983–84 at RSSSF

Preceded by 1982–83	FC Zürich seasons	Succeeded by 1984–85
