= 1982–83 FC Zürich season =

FC Zürich
1982–83 season
- Owner: Alfred Zweidler
- Chairman: Alfred Zweidler
- Head coach: Daniel Jeandupeux until March 1983; Heini Glättli; March to April; Max Merkel; April to May; Köbi Kuhn; May to July
- Stadium: Letzigrund
- Nationalliga A: Fourth position
- Swiss Cup: Semi-final
- 1982–83 UEFA Cup: Round 3
- 1982 Intertoto Cup: Fourth in group
- Top goalscorer: League: Jurica Jerković (10); All: Jurica Jerković (15)

The 1982–83 season was FC Zürich's 86th season in their existence, since their foundation in 1896. It was their 24th consecutive season in the top flight of Swiss football, following their promotion at the end of the 1957–58 season. They played their home games in the Letzigrund.

== Overview ==
The club's owner and chairman at this time was Alfred Zweidler. Daniel Jeandupeux remained the first team head coach for the third consecutive season. The FCZ first team competed in the domestic first-tier 1982–83 Nationalliga A and they also competed in 1982–83 Swiss Cup. As the third-place team in last season's championship, the team had qualified for the 1982–83 UEFA Cup. They also entered the 1982 Intertoto Cup.

However, in the early stage of the Spring season, following the Basel match on 20 March, the club FCZ and their head coach Daniel Jeandupeux parted ways. Heini Glättli took over the coaching straight away ad interim, standing on the side line for the match against Xamax on 23 March. Then a few days later Max Merkel, who was not on contract at that time, took over ad interim. Finally at the beginning of May, Köbi Kuhn, who since 1979 was in charge of the FCZ youth set-up, was appointed as caretaker manager until the end of the season.

== Players ==
The following is the list of the FCZ first team squad this season. It also includes players that were in the squad the day the domestic league season started, on 14 August 1982, but subsequently left the club after that date.

Note: Flags indicate national team as defined under FIFA eligibility rules; some limited exceptions apply. Players may hold more than one non-FIFA nationality.

No.	Pos.	Nation	Player
1	GK	SUI	Karl Grob (league games: 26)
—	GK	SUI	Hermann Rufli (league games: 4)
—	DF	SUI	Fritz Baur (league games: 25)
—	DF	SUI	Roland Häusermann (league games: 26)
—	DF	SUI	Ruedi Landolt (league games: 27)
—	DF	SUI	Heinz Lüdi (league games: 18)
—	DF	SUI	Bruno Misteli (league games: 0)
—	DF	SUI	René Ruch (league games: 0)
—	DF	NZL	Shane Rufer (league games: 6)
—	DF	SUI	Urs Schönenberger (league games: 11)
—	DF	SUI	Thomas Staub (league games: 0)
—	DF	SUI	Peter Stoll (league games: 5)
—	DF	SUI	Ruedi Zahner (league games: 16)

No.	Pos.	Nation	Player
—	DF	SUI	Gianpietro Zappa (league games: 21)
—	MF	SUI	Walter Iselin (league games: 24)
—	MF	SUI	Daniel Jeandupeux (league games: 1)
—	MF	YUG	Jurica Jerković (league games: 30)
—	MF	SUI	Roger Kundert (league games: 0)
—	MF	SUI	Elmar Landolt (league games: 0)
—	MF	SUI	David Mautone (league games: 0)
—	FW	SUI	Massimo Alliata (league games: 6)
—	FW	SUI	Ruedi Elsener (league games: 29)
—	FW	SUI	Erni Maissen (league games: 24)
—	FW	NZL	Wynton Rufer (league games: 23)
—	FW	SUI	Walter Seiler (league games: 26)
—	FW	SUI	Hans-Peter Zwicker (league games: 25)

Players who left the squad

Note: Flags indicate national team as defined under FIFA eligibility rules; some limited exceptions apply. Players may hold more than one non-FIFA nationality.

No.	Pos.	Nation	Player
—	GK	SUI	Urs Zurbuchen (on loan to Wettingen)
—	DF	SUI	Alberto Erba (to Chiasso)
—	MF	SUI	Michele Di Muro (to reserves)
—	MF	SUI	Fredi Scheiwiler (to Lausanne-Sport)

No.	Pos.	Nation	Player
—	FW	SUI	Beat Grossmann (to reserves)
—	FW	SUI	Winfried Kurz (to Bellinzona)
—	MF	SUI	Manfred Moser (to Chiasso)

== Results ==
Legend

Win Draw Loss Postponed

=== Nationalliga A ===
==== League matches ====
14 August 1982 Round 1	Zürich	5–1	Luzern	Letzigrund, Zürich
20:00	Lüdi 41' (1:0) (Waser) 44' (o.g.); Zwicker 83' (3:0); Zwicker 87' (4:1); Rufer 90' (5:1)	FCZ summary	84' (3:1) Hemmeter	Attendance: 7,000; Referee: (Switzerland) Jakob Baumann (Schaffhausen)
Note: 400th NLA match of Karl Grob.

21 August 1982 Round 2	Bulle	0–2	Zürich	Stade de Bouleyres, Bulle
20:00		FCZ summary	40' (0:1) Jerković; 88' (0:2) Jerković	Attendance: 3,000; Referee: (Switzerland) Franz Gächter (Aarau, Suhr, Aargau)

25 August 1982 Round 3	Young Boys	2–2	Zürich	Wankdorf Stadium, Bern
20:00	Peterhans 26' (1:1); Wagner 72' (2:2)	FCZ summary	36' (1:1) Maissen; 45' (1:2) Rufer; (yellow card) 76' Zwicker	Attendance: 13,500; Referee: (Switzerland) Philippe Mercier (Pully)

28 August 1982 Round 4	Zürich	2–1	Servette	Letzigrund, Zürich
20:00	Maissen 30' (1:1); Seiler 36' (2:1); Seiler (red card) 88'	FCZ summary	7' (0:1) Favre	Attendance: 8,500; Referee: (Switzerland) Georges Sandoz (Corcelles-Cormondrèche, Neuchâtel)

4 September 1982 Round 5	Aarau	0–1	Zürich	Stadion Brügglifeld, Aarau
20:00	Staub (yellow card)	FCZ summary FCA summary	16' (0:1) Schönenberger; (yellow card) Maissen	Attendance: 6,700; Referee: (Switzerland) Rudolf Renggli (Stans and Luzern)

11 September 1982 Round 6	Zürich	0–4	St. Gallen	Letzigrund, Zürich
20:00	Baur (yellow card) 56'	FCZ summary	9' (0:1) Sengör; 35' (0:2) Ritter; 42' (0:2) Ritter; 44' (0:4) Braschler	Attendance: 6,000; Referee: (Switzerland) Roland Chapuis, (Courtételle)
Note: Stanley Rous (former FIFA president) as guest of honor in the stands.

18 September 1982 Round 7	Grasshopper Club	2–1	Zürich	Hardturm, Zürich
20:00	Hermann 7' (1:0); Sulser 20' (2:0)	FCZ summary	(yellow card) 75' Landolt; 89' (2:1) Baur; (yellow card) 90' Zwicker	Attendance: 18,000; Referee: (Switzerland) Renzo Peduzzi (Roveredo)
Note: "Rockets fired before and during the match and a one-minute interruption of play [...] because the referee asked the captain of the home team to make another announcement over the loudspeaker." (Sport, 20.09.1982)

25 September 1982 Round 8	Zürich	4–1	Vevey-Sports	Letzigrund, Zürich
20:00	Elsener 62' (1:0); Seiler 72' (2:1); Jerković 75' (3:1); Jerković 81' (4:1); Zahner (yellow card) 86'	FCZ summary	65' (1:1) Siwek; (yellow card) 86' Franz	Attendance: 2,700; Referee: (Switzerland) Gottlieb Barmettler (Luzern)
Note: Jeandupeux warms up for 10 minutes following Vevey's equalizer.

10 October 1982 Round 9	Winterthur	2–2	Zürich	Schützenwiese, Winterthur
15:00	Meyer 38' (1:2); Meyer 90' (2:2)	FCZ summary	17' (0:1) Seiler; (yellow card) 29' Zwicker; 33' (0:2) Seiler; (yellow card) 88' Seiler	Attendance: 4,500; Referee: (Switzerland) Franz Gächter (Aarau, Suhr, Aargau)

23 October 1982 Round 10	Zürich	4–0	Bellinzona	Letzigrund, Zürich
20:00	Jerković 14' (1:0); Jerković 61' (2:0); Zwicker 80' (3:0) (Roland Weidle) 85' (o.g.)	FCZ summary		Attendance: 1,800; Referee: (Switzerland) Philippe Mercier (Pully)

30 October 1982 Round 11	Sion	0–1	Zürich	Stade Tourbillon, Sion
20:30		FCZ summary	64' (0:1) Elsener	Attendance: 5,000; Referee: (Switzerland) Werner Liebi (Thun)

7 November 1982 Round 12	Zürich	3–2	Xamax	Letzigrund, Zürich
	Seiler 8' (1:0); Elsener 65' (2:1); Rufer 75' (3:2)	FCZ summary	12' (1:1) Sarrasin; 68' (2:2) Sarrasin	Attendance: 10,000; Referee: (Switzerland) Gottlieb Barmettler (Luzern)

10 November 1982 Round 13	Basel	1–1	Zürich	St. Jakob Stadium, Basel
20:00	Jeitziner 13' (1:0); Zbinden (yellow card) 31'; Maissen (yellow card) 43'	FCZ summary Summary	33' (1:1) Landolt; (yellow card) 88' Lüdi	Attendance: 7,000; Referee: (Switzerland) Ulrich Nyffenegger
Note: On the cover of the match program for the championship game between FCB and FCZ on 10 November 1982, prominently featured the following announcement from Martin Jeitziner: "If we don't win, I will be giving away Züri-Tirggel (Zurich Tirggel cookies) on Thursday at 3 p.m. in Zürcherstrasse." Jeitziner does his best to prevent this "disgrace" and scored the opening goal very early on. However, Landolt managed to equalize before halftime, and so the next day Jeitziner stood in the Zürcherstrasse in Basel, giving away Züri-Tirggel cookies.

10 November 1982 Round 14	Zürich	0–2	Lausanne-Sport	Letzigrund, Zürich
20:00	Jerković (yellow card) 73'	FCZ summary	9' (0:1) Kok; (yellow card) 45' Lei-Ravello; (yellow card) 74' Parietti; 81' (0:2) Lei-Ravello	Attendance: 4,200; Referee: (Switzerland) Georges Sandoz (Corcelles-Cormondrèche, Neuchâtel)

28 November 1982 Round 15	Wettingen	3–1	Zürich	Stadion Altenburg, Wettingen
14:30	Schneider 2' (1:0); Fregno 71' (2:1); Schneider 88' (3:1)	FCZ summary	11' (1:1) Maissen; (yellow card) 3' (yellow-red card) 59' Lüdi; (yellow card) 85' Jeandupeux	Attendance: 6,200; Referee: (Switzerland) Robert Süess (Lucerne and Meggen)
Note: Jeandupeux warms himself up and substitutes himself in following Wettingen's 2:1.

27 February 198. Round 16	Zürich	2–0	Wettingen	Letzigrund, Zürich
14:30	Elsener 53' (1:0); Elsener 55' (2:0); (yellow card) 77' Zahner	FCZ summary		Attendance: 5,500; Referee: (Switzerland) Alfred Heinis (Ammannsegg, Biberist)

6 March 1983 Round 17	Lausanne-Sport	2–0	Zürich	Olympique de la Pontaise, Lausanne
14:30	Pellegrini 21' (1:0); Kok 88' (2:0)	FCZ summary	(yellow card) 3' Zappa; (yellow card) 86' Landolt; (yellow card) 89' Baur	Attendance: 7,500; Referee: (Switzerland) Gottlieb Barmettler (Luzern)

20 March 1983 Round 18	Zürich	4–3	Basel	Letzigrund, Zürich
14:30	Jerković 11' (pen. 1:0); Rufer 31' (2:0); Seiler 35' (3:0); Iselin (yellow card) 42'; Jerković 55' (pen. 4:1)	FCZ summary FCB summary	48' (pen. 3:1) Stohler; (yellow card) 69' Jeitziner; 74' (4:2) Gaisser; 75' (4:3) Sutter	Attendance: 9,200; Referee: (Switzerland) Kurt Röthlisberger Suhr
Note: Following this match FCZ and their head coach Daniel Jeandupeux parted ways.

23 March 1983 Round 19	Xamax	1–0	Zürich	Stade de la Maladière, Neuchâtel
20:00	Zaugg 70' (1:0)	FCZ summary	(yellow card) 79' Häusermann	Attendance: 7,800; Referee: (Switzerland) Renzo Peduzzi (Roveredo)
Note: Heini Glättli acted as coach, standing on the side line. Former FCZ coach Daniel Jeandupeux on the stands.

8 April 1983 Round 20	Zürich	2–1	Sion	Letzigrund, Zürich
20:00	Seiler 29' (1:0); Jerković 49' (2:0); Landolt (yellow card) 72'	FCZ summary	(yellow card) 13' Pierre-Alain Valentini; 61' (pen.) Bregy; (yellow card) 72' Jean-Yves Valentini	Attendance: 4,200; Referee: (Switzerland) Marco Raveglia (San Vittore)

16 April 1983 Round 21	Bellinzona	1–0	Zürich	Stadio Comunale, Bellinzona
20:30	Kurz 3' (1:0); Weidle (yellow card) 6'; Rossi (yellow card) 12'; Kundert (red card) 80'	FCZ summary	(yellow card) 16' Baur; (yellow card) 80' Elsener	Attendance: 3,000; Referee: (Switzerland) Franz Gächter (Aarau, Suhr, Aargau)

23 April 1983 Round 22	Zürich	4–1	Winterthur	Letzigrund, Zürich
20:00	Maissen 26' (1:0); Rufer 68' (2:1); Rufer 84' (3:1); Rufer 89' (4:1)	FCZ summary	67' (1:1) Dünner	Attendance: 3,000; Referee: (Switzerland) Alfred Heinis (Ammannsegg, Biberist)

30 April 1983 Round 23	Vevey-Sports	0–1	Zürich	Stade de Copet, Vevey
20:00		FCZ summary	(yellow card) 48' Zahner; 80' (1:0) Iselin	Attendance: 3,200; Referee: (Switzerland) Rolf Blattmann (Zeiningen)

8 May 1983 Round 24	Zürich	2–3	Grasshopper Club	Letzigrund, Zürich
16:00	Jerković 23' (1:0); Seiler (yellow card) 40'; Schönenberger 47' (2:1)	FCZ summary	28' (1:1) Koller; 74' (2:2) Koller; 90' (2:3) Jara	Attendance: 16,500; Referee: (Switzerland) Ulrich Nyffenegger (Nidau)
Note: 100th consecutive NLA game for Grob (since 16 March 1980) and Hermann (since 22 March 1980).

19 May 1983 Round 25	St. Gallen	1–0	Zürich	Espenmoos, St. Gallen
20:15	Gisinger 37' (1:0)	FCZ summary	(yellow card) 79' Baur	Attendance: 12,000; Referee: (Switzerland) Gottlieb Barmettler (Luzern)

28 May 1983 Round 26	Zürich	2–2	Aarau	Letzigrund, Zürich
20:00	Alliata 30' (1:0); Seiler 86' (2:2)	FCZ summary FCA summary	39' (1:1) Hegi; 65' (1:2) Schär	Attendance: 3,200; Referee: (Switzerland) Freddy Philippoz, (Sion)

1 June 1983 Round 27	Servette	2–3	Zürich	Charmilles Stadium, Geneva
20:00	Zwygart 5' (1:0); Renquin (yellow card) 67'; Zwygart 90+2' (2:3)	FCZ summary	40' (1:1) Rufer; 59' (1:2) Rufer; (yellow card) 70' Seiler; (yellow card) 82' Elsener; 87' (1:3) Elsener	Attendance: 9,000; Referee: (Switzerland) Arturo Martino, (Neukirch an der Thur)

5 June 1983 Round 28	Zürich	2–0	Young Boys	Letzigrund, Zürich
16:00	Elsener 83' (1:0); Zwicker 90' (2:0)	FCZ summary		Attendance: 3,800; Referee: (Switzerland) Willy Hänni, (Cugy)
Note: Sunny, hot day.

8 June 1983 Round 29	Zürich	2–1	Bulle	Letzigrund, Zürich
20:00	Zappa 45' (1:1); Seiler 86' (2:1)	FCZ summary	41' (0:1) Saunier	Attendance: 2,000; Referee: (Switzerland) Othmar Winter, (Martigny)

11 June 1983 Round 30	Luzern	0–2	Zürich	Stadion Allmend, Luzern
		FCZ summary	(yellow card) 26' Baur; (yellow card) 45' Jerković; 75' (0:1) Häusermann; 87' (0:2) Zahner	Attendance: 9,100; Referee: (Switzerland) Kurt Röthlisberger (Aarau)

==== Final league table ====
Pos	Team	Pld	W	D	L	GF	GA	GD	Pts	Qualification
1	Grasshopper Club	30	24	1	5	86	29	+57	49	Swiss champions, qualified for 1983–84 European Cup
2	Servette	30	22	4	4	65	24	+41	48	Swiss Cup finalist, qualified for 1983–84 Cup Winners' Cup
3	St. Gallen	30	17	6	7	61	31	+30	40	qualified for 1983–84 UEFA Cup and entered 1983 Intertoto Cup
4	Zürich	30	17	4	9	55	39	+16	38	qualified for 1983–84 UEFA Cup and entered 1983 Intertoto Cup
5	Lausanne-Sport	30	15	7	8	51	28	+23	37	
6	Xamax	30	15	7	8	61	40	+21	37	
7	Sion	30	12	11	7	51	36	+15	35	
8	Luzern	30	14	3	13	57	56	+1	31	entered 1983 Intertoto Cup
9	Young Boys	30	11	8	11	35	42	−7	30	entered 1983 Intertoto Cup
10	Wettingen	30	8	9	13	40	47	−7	25	
11	Basel	30	10	5	15	47	56	−9	25	
12	Vevey	30	9	4	17	42	61	−19	22	
13	AC Bellinzona	30	8	5	17	36	74	−38	21	
14	Aarau	30	8	4	18	32	52	−20	20	
15	Bulle	30	4	4	22	27	87	−60	12	Relegated to 1983–84 Nationalliga B
16	Winterthur	30	2	6	22	30	74	−44	10	Relegated to 1983–84 Nationalliga B

Source: rsssf.com
Rules for classification: 1) Points; 2) Goal difference within the league, but decider play-off for qualifiers;

=== Swiss Cup ===
16 October 1982 Round 3	FC Stäfa	0–2	Zürich	Sportanlage Frohberg, FC Stäfa
		FCZ summary	11' (0:1) Maissen; (yellow card) 21' Maissen; 69' (0:2) Elsener	Attendance: 3,300 (sold out); Referee: (Switzerland) Arturo Martino (Neukirch an der Thur)
Note: Stäfa played the 1982/83 season in der 2. Liga (fourth-tier).

13 March 1983 Round 4	SC Zug	0–4	Zürich	Allmend Stadion, Zug
14:30		FCZ summary	15' (0:1) Zwicker; 25' (0:2) Zwicker; 29' (0:3) Häusermann; 47' (0:4) Rufer	Attendance: 3,500; Referee: (Switzerland) Marco Raveglia (San Vittore)

4 April 1983 Round 5	Zürich	8–0	FC Boudry	Letzigrund, Zürich
14:30	Landolt 16' (1:0); Jerković 17' (2:0); Jerković 27' (3:0); Seiler 50' (4:0); Zwicker 56' (5:0); Landolt 64' (6:0); Zwicker 82' (7:0); Elsener 84' (8:0)	FCZ summary		Attendance: 1,968; Referee: (Switzerland) Arturo Martino (Neukirch an der Thur)

26 April 1983 Quarter-final	Zürich	3–1	Winterthur	Letzigrund, Zürich
14:30	Rufer 82' (1:1); Elsener 84' (2:1); Jerković 89' (3:1)	FCZ summary	57' (0:1) Venica	Attendance: 1,636; Referee: (Switzerland) Charles-Henri Morex (Bex)

3 May 1983 Semi-final	Grasshopper Club	5–1	Zürich	Hardturm, Zürich
	Sulser 26' (1:0); In-Albon 32' (2:0); Egli 55' (pen.); Marchand 60' (4:1); Marchand 80' (5:1)	FCZ summary	39' (2:1) Elsener	Attendance: 12,000; Referee: (Switzerland) Georges Sandoz (Corcelles-Cormondrèche, Neuchâtel)
Note: "Firecrackers from the FCZ corner throughout the entire game." (Sport, 4 May 1983, p. 2)

=== UEFA Cup ===
==== First round ====
15 September 1982 First leg	Pezoporikos Larnaca (Cyprus)	2–2	(Switzerland) Zürich	GSZ Stadium, Larnaca
15:30	Theofanous 24'; Vernon 35'	Report	Seiler 40'; Jerković 50'	Attendance: 3,000; Referee: Akhmed Yasharov (Bulgaria)

29 September 1982 Second leg	Zürich (Switzerland)	1–0	(Cyprus) Pezoporikos Larnaca	Letzigrund, Zürich
20:00	Lüdi 69'	Report		Attendance: 3,200; Referee: Gerald Losert (Austria)

Zürich won 3–2 on aggregate.

==== Second Round ====
20 October 1982 First leg	Ferencváros (Hungary)	1–1	(Switzerland) Zürich	Üllői úti Stadion, Budapest
18:00	Szokolai 56'	Report	Seiler 18'	Attendance: 18,612; Referee: Victoriano Sánchez Arminio (Spain)

3 November 1982 Second leg	Zürich (Switzerland)	1–0	(Hungary) Ferencváros	Letzigrund, Zürich
20:00	Seiler 56'	Report		Attendance: 9,100; Referee: Mircea Salomir (Romania)

FC Zürich won 2–1 on aggregate.

==== Third round ====
24 November 1982 First leg	Zürich (Switzerland)	1–1	(Portugal) Benfica	Letzigrund, Zürich
20:00	W. Rufer 76'	Report	Filipović 86'	Attendance: 19,000; Referee: Siegfried Kirschen (East Germany)
Note: "Several Portuguese players wearing gloves. Almost half the spectators were Portuguese guest workers from all over Switzerland." (Sport, November 26, 1982)

8 December 1982 Second leg	Benfica (Portugal)	4–0	(Switzerland) Zürich	Estádio da Luz, Lisbon
21:00	Filipović 12'; Diamantino 51'; Nené 60', 86' (pen.)	Report		Attendance: 75,000; Referee: Volker Roth (West Germany)

Benfica won 5–1 on aggregate.

=== Intertoto Cup ===
==== Group 8 matches ====
26 June 1982 Matchday 1	Zbrojovka Brno (Czechoslovakia)	4–1	(Switzerland) Zürich	Brno
	Nesvacil 6' (1:0) (Staub) 15' (o.g.); Mikulicka 55' (3:0); Češek 62' (4:0)	FCZ summary	69' (4:1) Kundert; (yellow card) Schönenberger	Attendance: 2,500; Referee: (Czechoslovakia) Wencl
Note: Jeandupeux absent (at the World Cup in Spain).

3 July 1982 Matchday 2	Zürich (Switzerland)	1–2	(Sweden) Öster	Paul-Walser-Stiftung, Wohlen, Aargau
	Seiler 62' (1:2)	FCZ summary	27' (0:1) Stavander; 42' (0:2) Stavander	Attendance: 800; Referee: (Switzerland) Ulrich Nyffenegger (Nidau)

10 July 1982 Matchday 3	Öster (Sweden)	3–0	(Switzerland) Zürich	Borgholm
	Mattsson 40' (1:0); Hallén 78' (2:0); Hallén 90' (3:0)	FCZ summary	(yellow card) Maissen; (yellow card) Lüdi; (yellow card) Zappa	Attendance: 2,500; Referee: (Sweden) Harrisson

17 July 1982 Matchday 4	Zürich (Switzerland)	2–3	(Czechoslovakia) Zbrojovka Brno	Sportplatz Moos, Affoltern am Albis
	Rufer 2' (1:0); Zwicker 62' (2:2)	FCZ summary	12' (pen. 1:1) Janečka; 42' (1:2) Janečka; 78' (2:3) Nesvacil; (yellow card) 80' Mikulicka	Attendance: 900; Referee: (Switzerland) Jakob Baumann (Schaffhausen)

24 July 1982 Matchday 5	ŁKS Łódź (Poland)	3–0	(Switzerland) Zürich	Łódź
	Plachta 26' (1:0); Wesolowski 36' (2:0); Milczarski 84' (3:0)	FCZ summary	(red card) Zappa; (yellow card) Jerković; (yellow card) Landolt	Attendance: 1,000; Referee: (Poland) Władysław Urbańczyk

31 July 1982 Matchday 6	Zürich (Switzerland)	3–0	(Poland) ŁKS Łódź	Beichlen, Wädenswil
	Jerković 53' (1:0); Rufer 68' (2:0); Lüdi 87' (3:0)	FCZ summary		Attendance: 1,000; Referee: (Switzerland) Jean-Marie Macheret (Rueyres-Saint-Laurent)

==== Final group table ====
Pos	Team	Pld	W	D	L	GF	GA	GD	Pts	ÖST	BRN	ŁKS	ZÜR
1	(Sweden) Öster	6	4	1	1	12	7	+5	9	—	2–0	4–3	3–0
1	(Czechoslovakia) Zbrojovka Brno	6	4	1	1	11	6	+5	9	2–0	—	2–1	4–1
3	(Poland) ŁKS Łódź	6	1	2	3	8	10	−2	4	1–1	0–0	—	3–0
4	(Switzerland) Zürich	6	1	0	5	7	15	−8	2	1–2	2–3	3–0	—

Source: mogiel.net
Rules for classification: 1) Points; 2) Goal difference; 3) Goals scored; 4) Head-to-head points; 5) Away goals scored; 6) Draw.

=== Friendly matches ===
==== Pre- and mid-season ====
21 July 1982 Exhibition game	Zürich	5–2	Blue Stars	Letzigrund, Zürich
	Goal	FCZ summary	Goal

28 July 1982 Exhibition game	Zürich	4–3	1. FC Nürnberg	Sportplatz Chruzeren, Unterägeri
	Zwicker 15' (1:0); Maissen 28' (2:1); Maissen 33' (3:1); Zwicker 35' (4:1)	FCZ summary	18' (1:1) Eder; 44' (4:2) Heck; 89' (4:3) Heck	Attendance: 1,600; Referee: (Switzerland) Bruno Burgener (Kriens)

5 August 1982 Exhibition game	Metz	2–2	Zürich	Amnéville
	Rohr 30' (1:0); Sonor 53' (2:1)	FCZ summary	43' (1:1) Seiler; 65' (2:2) Jerković	Attendance: 1,500; Referee: (France) Stenger (Metz)

6 August 1982 Exhibition game	Nancy	1–2	Zürich	Nancy
	65' (1:1)	FCZ summary	28' (0:1) Rufer; 75' (1:2) Zwicker

10 August 1982 Exhibition game	FC Altstätten	0–3	Zürich	Grüntal, Altstätten
		FCZ summary	33' (0:1) Maissen; 54' (0:2) Seiler; 55' (0:3) Häusermann	Attendance: 1,000; Referee: (Switzerland) Arturo Martino, (Neukirch an der Thur)

17 August 1982 Mid-season	FC Brugg	2–3	Zürich	Stadion Au, Brugg
	Wolfensberger 11' (1:0); Hänni 67' (2:2)	FCZ summary	41' (1:1) Baur; 44' (1:2) Maissen; 81' (2:3) Elsener	Attendance: 650; Referee: (Switzerland) Kurt Röthlisberger (Aarau)

5 September 1982 Mid-season	FC Brüttisellen	0–5	Zürich	Wangen-Brüttisellen
		FCZ summary	21' (0:1) Jerković; 30' (0:2) Jerković; 32' (0:3) Jerković; 40' (0:4) Seiler; 46' (0:5) Seiler	Attendance: 500; Referee: (Switzerland) Bürki Zürich
Note: Playing time: 2 x 40 Minutes

==== Winter break ====
23 January 1983 Exhibition game	Highlanders (Bulawayo)	2–3	Zürich	Barbourfields Stadium, Bulawayo, Zimbabwe
	Goal	FCZ summary	Lüdi; Maissen; Maissen	Attendance: 20,000
Note: Hot: 32 degrees

26 January 1983 Exhibition game	CAPS United (Harare)	1–2	Zürich	Harare, Zimbabwe
	Goal	FCZ summary	Schönenberger; Jerković; (penalty missed) 1′ Elsener	Attendance: 12,000

30 January 1983 Exhibition game	Zimbabwe	1–0	Zürich	National Sports Stadium, Harare, Zimbabwe
	Goal	FCZ summary		Attendance: 25,000

2 February 1983 Exhibition game	Kariba selection	6–2	Zürich	Kariba, Zimbabwe
	Goal	FCZ summary	Goal	Attendance: 1,500

12 February 1983 Exhibition game	Grenchen	0–4	Zürich	Stadion Brühl, Grenchen
		FCZ summary	6' (0:1) Elsener; 38' (0:2) Jerković; 65' (0:3) Zwicker; 74' (pen.) Jerković	Attendance: 200; Referee: (Switzerland) Manfred Schlup, (Grenchen)
Note: Pitch covered in snow.

13 February 1983 Exhibition game	FC Bern	2–1	Zürich	Stadion Neufeld, Bern
	Burkhardt (yellow card) 60'; Zbinden (yellow card) 65'; Zbinden 70' (1:1); Cammarota 89' (2:1)	FCZ summary	13' (0:1) Zwicker	Attendance: 200; Referee: (Switzerland) Werner Liebi (Thun)

15 February 1983 Exhibition game	FC Rüti	1–6	Zürich	Schützenwiese, Rüti
	Goal	FCZ summary	Rufer; Elsener; Rufer; Zwicker; Lüdi; Zwicker

19 February 1983 Exhibition game	Lugano	0–4	Zürich	Cornaredo, Lugano
		FCZ summary	24' (0:1) Rufer; 58' (0:2) Elsener; 73' (0:3) Seiler; 82' (0:4) Elsener	Attendance: 350; Referee: (Switzerland) Renzo Peduzzi (Roveredo)

20 February 1983 Exhibition game	Locarno	1–4	Zürich	Stadio del Lido, Locarno
	Ferrari 3' (pen.)	FCZ summary	49' (1:1) Maissen; 52' (1:2) Alliata; 57' (1:3) Jerković; 75' (1:4) Jerković	Attendance: 500; Referee: (Switzerland) Sandro Gozzi Bellinzona

20 April 1983 Mid-season	Zürich	8–0	Blue Stars	Letzigrund, Zürich
	Goal	FCZ summary

== Sources ==
- dbFCZ Homepage
- Switzerland 1982–83 at RSSSF

Preceded by 1981–82	FC Zürich seasons	Succeeded by 1983–84
