= 1981–82 FC Zürich season =

FC Zürich
1981–82 season
- Owner: Alfred Zweidler
- Chairman: Alfred Zweidler
- Head coach: Daniel Jeandupeux
- Stadium: Letzigrund
- Nationalliga A: 3rd
- Swiss Cup: Round 4
- 1981–82 Swiss League Cup: Round 1
- 1981–82 European Cup: Round 1
- 1981 Intertoto Cup: 4th in group
- Top goalscorer: League: Walter Seiler (15); All: Walter Seiler (16)

The 1981–82 season was FC Zürich's 85th season in their existence, since their foundation in 1896. It was their 23rd consecutive season in the top flight of Swiss football, following their promotion at the end of the 1957–58 season. They played their home games in the Letzigrund.

== Overview ==
The club's president at this time was Alfred Zweidler, who had taken over this position following Edwin Nägeli death in December 1979. Last season's newly appointed head-coach Daniel Jeandupeux continued in this position for this his second season. FCZ competed in the domestic first-tier 1981–82 Nationalliga A, attempting to retain their title as Swiss champions that they had won last season. As they were Swiss champions, the team had qualified for 1981–82 European Cup. The team also competed in 1981–82 Swiss Cup and in the 1981–82 Swiss League Cup. They also entered the 1981 Intertoto Cup.

== Players ==
The following is the list of the FCZ first team squad this season. It also includes players that were in the squad the day the domestic league season started, on 15 August 1981, but subsequently left the club after that date.

Note: Flags indicate national team as defined under FIFA eligibility rules; some limited exceptions apply. Players may hold more than one non-FIFA nationality.

| No. | Pos. | Nation | Player |
|---|---|---|---|
| 1 | GK | SUI | Karl Grob (league games: 30) |
| — | GK | SUI | Urs Zurbuchen (league games: 2) |
| — | DF | SUI | Fritz Baur (league games: 23) |
| — | DF | SUI | Alberto Erba (league games: 19) |
| — | DF | SUI | Ruedi Landolt (league games: 28) |
| — | DF | SUI | Heinz Lüdi (league games: 27) |
| — | DF | SUI | René Ruch (league games: 0) |
| — | DF | SUI | Urs Schönenberger (league games: 13) |
| — | DF | SUI | Thomas Staub (league games: 9) |
| — | DF | SUI | Gianpietro Zappa (league games: 30) |
| — | MF | SUI | Michele Di Muro (league games: 0) |
| — | MF | SUI | Walter Iselin (league games: 24) |

| No. | Pos. | Nation | Player |
|---|---|---|---|
| — | MF | SUI | Daniel Jeandupeux (league games: 1) |
| — | MF | YUG | Jurica Jerković (league games: 28) |
| — | MF | SUI | Roger Kundert (league games: 26) |
| — | MF | SUI | Fredi Scheiwiler (league games: 27) |
| — | MF | SUI | H. Schmid (league games: 0) |
| — | MF | SUI | Selin (league games: 0) |
| — | FW | SUI | Ruedi Elsener (league games: 30) |
| — | FW | SUI | Beat Grossmann (league games: 0) |
| — | FW | SUI | Winfried Kurz (league games: 7) |
| — | MF | SUI | Manfred Moser (league games: 0) |
| — | FW | SUI | Walter Seiler (league games: 29) |
| — | FW | SUI | Hans-Peter Zwicker (league games: 23) |

Players who left the squad

Note: Flags indicate national team as defined under FIFA eligibility rules; some limited exceptions apply. Players may hold more than one non-FIFA nationality.

| No. / Pos. / Nation / Player; — / MF / SUI / Manfred Moser (to Chiasso) | No. / Pos. / Nation / Player; — / FW / SUI / Franz Peterhans (to Young Boys) |

== Results ==
Legend

Win Draw Loss Postponed

=== Nationalliga A ===
==== League matches ====
| 15 August 1981 Round 1 | Sion | 1–1 | Zürich | Stade Tourbillon, Sion |
| 20:15 | Georges Bregy 59' (1:1); Perrier (yellow card) 90' | FCZ summary | 13' (0:1) Jerković | Attendance: 6,000; Referee: (Switzerland) Rudolf Renggli (Luzern) |

| 22 August 1981 Round 2 | Zürich | 1–0 | Young Boys | Letzigrund, Zürich |
| 20:00 | Weber (o.g.) | FCZ summary | | Attendance: 8,300; Referee: (Switzerland) Franz Gächter (Aarau, Suhr, Aargau) |

| 29 August 1981 Round 3 | Bellinzona | 1–1 | Zürich | Stadio Comunale Bellinzona, Bellinzona |
| 20:00 | 46' (1:1) Rossi | FCZ summary | Viel 25' (o.g.) | Attendance: 6,300; Referee: (Switzerland) Bruno Burgener (Kriens) |

| 5 September 1981 Round 4 | Zürich | 0–0 | St. Gallen | Letzigrund, Zürich |
| 20:00 | Scheiwiler (yellow card) 78' | FCZ summary | | Attendance: 8,500; Referee: (Germany) Norbert Brückner. |
Note: First Swiss top-tier game to be officiated by a Bundesliga referee

| 12 September 1981 Round 5 | Grasshopper Club | 2–2 | Zürich | Hardturm, Zürich |
| 20:00 | Jara (yellow card) 60'; Sulser 70' (1:2); Egli (yellow card) 78'; Jara 79' (2:2) | FCZ summary | 14' (0:1) Jerković; 27' (0:2) Seiler; (yellow card) 71' (yellow-red card) 78' Baur; (yellow card) 82' (yellow-red card) 86' Jerković; (yellow card) 88' Schönenberger | Attendance: 14,500; Referee: (Switzerland) Bruno Galler (Kirchdorf, Bern) |

| 19 September 1981 Round 6 | Zürich | 2–2 | Aarau | Letzigrund, Zürich |
| 20:00 | Seiler 32' (1:1); Zappa 57' (2:2) | FCZ summary FCA summary | 28' (0:1) Rietmann; (yellow card) 32' Osterwalder; 45' (1:2) Osterwalder | Attendance: 4,500; Referee: (Switzerland) Arturo Martino, Neukirch an der Thur |
Note: Corners: 14:2

| 22 September 1981 Round 7 | Vevey-Sports | 0–1 | Zürich | Stade de Copet, Vevey |
| 20:00 | Marchi (yellow card) 84' | FCZ summary | 83' (0:1) Seiler | Attendance: 3,700; Referee: (Switzerland) Alfred Heinis (Ammannsegg, Biberist) |

| 4 October 1981 Round 8 | Zürich | 3–1 | Basel | Letzigrund, Zürich |
| 14:30 | Seiler 12' (1:0); Maradan 44' (o.g. 2:0); Landolt (yellow card) 81'; Seiler 89' (3:1) | FCZ summary FCB summary | (yellow card) 5' Gaisser; 49' (2:1) Jeitziner; (yellow card) 55' Sutter | Attendance: 14,500; Referee: (Switzerland) Ulrich Nyffenegger (Nidau) |

| 18 October 1981 Round 9 | Luzern | 0–2 | Zürich | Stadion Allmend, Luzern |
| 14:30 | Meyer (yellow card) 9'; Tanner (yellow card) 15' | FCZ summary | 51' (0:1) Jerković; (penalty missed) 56′ Zappa; 75' (0:2) Zwicker | Attendance: 16,400; Referee: (Switzerland) Renzo Peduzzi (Roveredo) |

| 25 October 1981 Round 10 | Zürich | 1–0 | Chiasso | Letzigrund, Zürich |
| 14:30 | Schönenberger 26' (1:0) | FCZ summary | (yellow card) 16' Bevilacqua; (yellow card) 30' Baroni; (yellow card) 68' Melgrati | Attendance: 4,000; Referee: (Switzerland) Charles-Henri Morex (Bex) |
Note: Corners: 32:3

| 7 November 1981 Round 11 | FC Bulle | 0–1 | Zürich | Stade de Bouleyres, Bulle |
| 16:00 | | FCZ summary | 34' (0:1) Landolt; (yellow card) 76' Seiler | Attendance: 2,800; Referee: (Switzerland) Jakob Baumann (Schaffhausen) |

| 15 November 1981 Round 12 | Zürich | 3–2 | Servette | Letzigrund, Zürich |
| 14:30 | Seiler 15' (1:0); Jerković (yellow card) 37'; Zwicker 59' (2:1); Zwicker 89' (1:3) | FCZ summary | 24' (pen.) Favre; (yellow card) 38' Valentini; 90' (3:2) Pleimelding | Attendance: 21,500; Referee: (Switzerland) Gottlieb Barmettler (Luzern) |

| 21 November 1981 Round 13 | Zürich | 1–1 | Xamax | Letzigrund, Zürich |
| 17:00 | Jerković (yellow card) 32'; Lüdi 66' (1:0); Seiler (yellow card) 90+1' | FCZ summary | 33' (0:1) Pellegrini | Attendance: 8,000; Referee: (Switzerland) Marco Raveglia (San Vittore) |

| 29 November 1981 Round 14 | Nordstern | 0–3 | Zürich | Rankhof, Basel |
| 14:30 | | FCZ summary | 12' (0:1) Seiler; 14' (0:2) Zappa; 68' (0:3) Lüdi | Attendance: 1,100; Referee: (Switzerland) Rudolf Renggli (Stans and Luzern) |

| 6 December 1981 Round 15 | Zürich | 4–2 | Lausanne-Sport | Letzigrund, Zürich |
| 14:30 | Zwicker 14' (1:0); Zwicker 23' (2:1); Scheiwiler 50' (3:1); Zwicker 87' (4:2) | FCZ summary | 21' (1:1) Kok; 70' (3:2) Mauron; (yellow card) 72' Lei-Ravello | Attendance: 4,000; Referee: (Switzerland) Jean-Marie Macheret, (Rueyres-St-Laurent) |

| Round 16 | Young Boys | P–P | Zürich | Wankdorf Stadium, Bern |
| | | [ FCZ summary] |

| 28 February 1982 Round 17 | Zürich | 6–0 | Bellinzona | Letzigrund, Zürich |
| 14:30 | Zappa 15' (1:0); Jerković 35' (2:0); Zwicker 53' (3:0); Jerković 57' (4:0); Elsener 75' (5:0); Lüdi 79' (6:0) | FCZ summary | | Attendance: 1,900; Referee: (Switzerland) Philippe Mercier (Pully) |

| 7 March 1982 Round 18 | St. Gallen | 0–0 | Zürich | Espenmoos, St. Gallen |
| 14:30 | | FCZ summary | | Attendance: 8,800; Referee: (Switzerland) Freddy Philippoz, Sion |

| 14 March 1982 Round 19 | Zürich | 0–1 | Grasshopper Club | Letzigrund, Zürich |
| 14:30 | | FCZ summary | 87' (0:1) Marchand; (yellow card) 89' Meier | Attendance: 20,000; Referee: (Switzerland) Jakob Baumann (Schaffhausen) |

| 27 March 1982 Round 20 | Aarau | 1–1 | Zürich | Stadion Brügglifeld, Aarau |
| 20:00 | Rietmann 41' (1:0); Zehnder (yellow card) 42' | FCZ summary FCA summary | (yellow card) 47' Scheiwiler; 60' (1:1) Seiler; (yellow card) 73' Seiler | Attendance: 7,200; Referee: (Switzerland) André Daina (Éclépens) |

| 31 March 1982 Round 21 | Zürich | 1–0 | Vevey-Sports | Letzigrund, Zürich |
| 20:00 | Elsener 89' (1:0) | FCZ summary | | Attendance: 1,900; Referee: (Switzerland) Manfred Schlup, (Grenchen) |

| 3 April 1982 Round 22 | Basel | 0–2 | Zürich | St. Jakob Stadium, Basel |
| 20:00 | | FCZ summary FCB summary | 16' (0:1) Jerković; (yellow card) 42' Iselin; 69' (0:2) Erba; (yellow card) 84' Jerković; (yellow card) 86' Landolt | Attendance: 6,500; Referee: (Germany) Werner Föckler Bad Dürkheim |
Note: Corners: 10:7

| 8 April 1982 Round 16 | Young Boys | 3–0 | Zürich | Wankdorf Stadium, Bern |
| 20:00 | Peterhans 62' (1:0); Schönenberger 64' (2:0); Schönenberger (yellow card) 70'; Peterhans 85' (3:0) | FCZ summary | (yellow card) 24' Erba | Attendance: 15,000; Referee: (Switzerland) Philippe Mercier (Pully) |
Note: Rescheduled match

| 8 April 1982 Round 23 | Zürich | 3–0 | Luzern | Letzigrund, Zürich |
| 14:30 | Elsener 12' (1:0); Jerković 44' (2:0); Seiler 76' (3:0) | FCZ summary | | Attendance: 5,500; Referee: (Switzerland) Roland Chapuis, (Courtételle) |

| 24 April 1982 Round 24 | Chiasso | 1–4 | Zürich | Stadio Comunale Riva IV, Chiasso |
| 20:30 | Kalbermatter 59' (1:2) | FCZ summary | 28' (o.g.) Bernaschina; 47' (0:2) Seiler; 85' (1:3) Elsener; 86' (1:4) Scheiwiler | Attendance: 1,500; Referee: (Switzerland) Georges Sandoz (Corcelles-Cormondrèche, Neuchâtel) |

| 2 May 1982 Round 25 | Zürich | 5–2 | FC Bulle | Letzigrund, Zürich |
| 16:00 | Seiler 21' (1:0); Jerković 42' (2:0); Scheiwiler 66' (3:0); Jerković 88' (4:2); Landolt 90' (5:2) | FCZ summary | (yellow card) 56' Sampedro; (yellow card) 65' Mantoan; 71' (3:1) Villoz; 75' (3:2) Bapst | Attendance: 3,100; Referee: (Switzerland) Walter Nussbaumer (Crans-près-Céligny) |

| 8 May 1982 Round 26 | Servette | 1–1 | Zürich | Charmilles Stadium, Geneva |
| 20:00 | Favre (yellow card) 36'; Yaghcha (yellow card) 88'; Favre 90+3' (1:1) | FCZ summary | 36' (0:1) Seiler; (yellow card) 68' Scheiwiler | Attendance: 16,000; Referee: (Switzerland) Jakob Baumann (Schaffhausen) |

| 15 May 1982 Round 27 | Xamax | 1–1 | Zürich | Stade de la Maladière, Neuchâtel |
| 20:00 | Küffer 28' (1:0); Hasler (yellow card) 75' | FCZ summary | (yellow card) 28' Lüdi; (yellow card) 28' Elsener; 38' (1:1) Lüdi | Attendance: 13,400; Referee: (Switzerland) Renzo Peduzzi (Roveredo) |

| 25 May 1982 Round 28 | Zürich | 2–1 | Sion | Letzigrund, Zürich |
| 20:00 | Zappa 59' (pen.); Zwicker 74' (2:1) | FCZ summary | 24' (0:1) Cernicky | Attendance: 4,500; Referee: (Switzerland) Alfred Heinis (Ammannsegg, Biberist) |

| 5 June 1982 Round 29 | Zürich | 8–1 | FC Nordstern Basel | Letzigrund, Zürich |
| 20:00 | Zwicker 8' (1:0); Jerković 22' (2:); Jerković 37' (3:1); Zwicker 52' (4:1); Elsener 62' (5:1); Seiler 71' (6:1); Seiler 87' (7:1); Kurz 90' (8:1) | FCZ summary | 10' (1:1) Glaser | Attendance: 2,800; Referee: (Switzerland) Gottlieb Barmettler (Luzern) |

| 9 June 1982 Round 30 | Lausanne-Sport | 1–2 | Zürich | Olympique de la Pontaise, Lausanne |
| 20:00 | Lei-Ravello 58' (1:1) | FCZ summary | 45' (0:1) Elsener; 80' (1:2) Seiler | Attendance: 5,200; Referee: (Switzerland) Manfred Schlup, (Grenchen) |

==== Final league table ====
| Pos | Team | Pld | W | D | L | GF | GA | GD | Pts | Qualification or relegation |
|---|---|---|---|---|---|---|---|---|---|---|
| 1 | Grasshopper Club | 30 | 21 | 7 | 2 | 72 | 24 | +48 | 49 | Swiss champions, qualified for 1982–83 European Cup |
| 2 | Servette | 30 | 20 | 6 | 4 | 76 | 32 | +44 | 46 | Qualified for 1982–83 UEFA Cup |
| 3 | Zürich | 30 | 18 | 10 | 2 | 62 | 25 | +37 | 46 | Qualified for 1982–83 UEFA Cup and entered 1982 Intertoto Cup |
| 4 | Xamax | 30 | 18 | 9 | 3 | 67 | 30 | +37 | 45 | |
| 5 | Young Boys | 30 | 15 | 9 | 6 | 52 | 40 | +12 | 39 | Entered 1982 Intertoto Cup |
| 6 | Sion | 30 | 12 | 7 | 11 | 51 | 46 | +5 | 31 | Swiss Cup winners, qualified for 1982–83 Cup Winners' Cup |
| 7 | Aarau | 30 | 10 | 8 | 12 | 51 | 55 | −4 | 28 | |
| 8 | Basel | 30 | 11 | 6 | 13 | 47 | 51 | −4 | 28 | |
| 9 | Luzern | 30 | 10 | 7 | 13 | 54 | 59 | −5 | 27 | Entered 1982 Intertoto Cup |
| 10 | St. Gallen | 30 | 10 | 5 | 15 | 40 | 45 | −5 | 25 | Entered 1982 Intertoto Cup |
| 11 | Vevey-Sports | 30 | 6 | 11 | 13 | 44 | 57 | −13 | 23 | |
| 12 | Bellinzona | 30 | 7 | 7 | 16 | 34 | 66 | −32 | 21 | |
| 13 | Lausanne-Sport | 30 | 6 | 8 | 16 | 39 | 52 | −13 | 20 | |
| 14 | Bulle | 30 | 5 | 9 | 16 | 29 | 58 | −29 | 19 | |
| 15 | Nordstern Basel | 30 | 6 | 5 | 19 | 29 | 69 | −40 | 17 | Relegated to 1982–83 Nationalliga B |
| 16 | Chiasso | 30 | 4 | 8 | 18 | 25 | 63 | −38 | 16 | Relegated to 1982–83 Nationalliga B |

Source: rsssf.com
Rules for classification: 1) points; 2) goal difference; 3) number of goals scored.

=== Swiss Cup ===
| 26 September 1981 Round 3 | FC Glarus | 0–5 | Zürich | Buchholz, Glarus |
| 14:30 | Huttary (head coach) (yellow card) 15' | FCZ summary | 37' (0:1) Lüdi; 62' (0:2) Zwicker; 67' (0:3) Lüdi; 70' (0:4) Elsener; 75' (0:5) Jeandupeux | Attendance: 3,000; Referee: (Switzerland) Jakob Baumann (Schaffhausen) |

| 1 November 1981 Round 4 | Luzern | 6–1 | Zürich | Stadion Allmend, Luzern |
| 14:30 | Kaufmann 27' (1:0); Risi 41' (2:1); Lauscher 43' (3:1); Risi 45' (pen.); Risi 81' (5:1); Hitzfeld 86' (pen.) | FCZ summary | 31' (1:1) Seiler | Attendance: 10,100; Referee: (Switzerland) Arturo Martino (Neukirch an der Thur) |

=== Swiss League Cup ===
| 5 August 1981 Round 1 | Zürich | 0–1 | St. Gallen | Letzigrund, Zürich |
| | | FCZ summary | 61' (0:1) Sengör | Attendance: 1,732; Referee: (Switzerland) Marco Raveglia (San Vittore) |

=== European Cup ===
| 16 September 1981 First round first leg | BFC Dynamo (East Germany) | 2–0 | (Switzerland) Zürich | Friedrich-Ludwig-Jahn-Stadion, East Berlin |
| 20:00 | Schulz 53'; Riediger 59' | FCZ summary UEFA report | | Attendance: 28,000; Referee: (Italy) Enzo Barbaresco |

| 30 September 1981 First round return leg | Zürich (Switzerland) | 3–1 (3–3 agg.) | (East Germany) BFC Dynamo | Letzigrund, Zürich |
| 20:00 | Jerković 2' (1:0); Jerković 22' (2:0); Jerković 87' (3:1) | FCZ summary UEFA report | Ullrich 47' (2:1) | Attendance: 7,800; Referee: (Portugal) César Correia |

3–3 on aggregate; BFC Dynamo won on away goals.

=== Intertoto Cup ===
==== Group 3 matches ====
| 27 June 1981 Matchday 1 | Malmö FF (Sweden) | 2–1 | (Switzerland) Zürich | Malmö Stadion, Malmö |
| | Palmér 29' (1:0); Nilsson 45' (2:0) | FCZ summary | 80' (2:1) Moser; (yellow card) Iselin; (yellow card) Zappa | Attendance: 2,042; Referee: (Sweden) Ingemar Johansson |

| 4 July 1981 Matchday 2 | Werder Bremen (West Germany) | 3–1 | (Switzerland) Zürich | Wilhelmshaven |
| | Reinders 12' (1:1); Kostedde 35' (2:1); Reinders 40' (3:1); Reinders (penalty missed) 66′ | FCZ summary | 6' (0:1) Erba | Attendance: 4,000; Referee: (West Germany) Dieter Pauly |

| 11 July 1981 Matchday 3 | Zürich (Switzerland) | 3–0 | (Bulgaria) Spartak Pleven | Kestenholz |
| | Zwicker 26' (1:0); Kurz 60' (2:0); Landolt 65' (3:0) | FCZ summary | | Attendance: 800; Referee: (Switzerland) Georges Sandoz (Corcelles-Cormondrèche, Neuchâtel) |

| 18 July 1981 Matchday 4 | Zürich (Switzerland) | 0–0 | (Sweden) Malmö FF | Sportplatz Thal, Kloten |
| | | FCZ summary | | Attendance: 900; Referee: (Switzerland) Rudolf Renggli (Luzern) |
Note: Inauguration of the Thal sports field

| 25 July 1981 Matchday 5 | Spartak Pleven (Bulgaria) | 4–1 | (Switzerland) Zürich | Pleven |
| | Getov 4' (1:0); Lazarev 31' (2:0); Todorov 41' (3:0); Milkov 56' (4:0) | FCZ summary | 68' (4:1) Erba | Attendance: 2,500; Referee: (Bulgaria) Čončev |

| 2 August 1981 Matchday 6 | Zürich (Switzerland) | 1–5 | (West Germany) Werder Bremen | Sportplatz im Moos, Rüschlikon |
| | Zappa 12' (1:0) | FCZ summary | 23' (pen. 1:1) Reinders; 37' (1:2) Meier; 67' (1:3) Reinders; 75' (1:4) Otten; 78' (1:5) Rautiainen | Attendance: 1,450; Referee: (Switzerland) André Daina (Éclépens) |

==== Final group table ====
| Pos | Team | Pld | W | D | L | GF | GA | GD | Pts | BRE | MAL | SPL | ZÜR |
|---|---|---|---|---|---|---|---|---|---|---|---|---|---|
| 1 | (West Germany) Werder Bremen | 6 | 5 | 1 | 0 | 15 | 6 | +9 | 11 | — | 1–0 | 1–0 | 3–1 |
| 2 | (Sweden) Malmö FF | 6 | 2 | 2 | 2 | 7 | 7 | 0 | 6 | 2–2 | — | 3–1 | 2–1 |
| 3 | (Bulgaria) Spartak Pleven | 6 | 2 | 0 | 4 | 9 | 11 | −2 | 4 | 2–3 | 2–0 | — | 4–1 |
| 4 | (Switzerland) Zürich | 6 | 1 | 1 | 4 | 7 | 14 | −7 | 3 | 1–5 | 0–0 | 3–0 | — |

Source: mogiel.net
Rules for classification: 1) Points; 2) Goal difference; 3) Goals scored; 4) Head-to-head points; 5) Away goals scored; 6) Draw.

=== Friendly matches ===
==== Pre and mid-season ====
| 29 July 1981 Exhibition game | Zürich | 0–3 | VfB Stuttgart | Wankdorf Stadium, Bern |
| | | FCZ summary | 28' (0:1) Beck; 59' (0:2) Ohlicher; 84' (0:3) Tüfekçi | Attendance: 5,000; Referee: (Switzerland) Rudolf Renggli (Stans and Luzern) |
Note: Semi-final of the Philipps-Cup.

| 31 July 1981 Exhibition game | Zürich | 2–1 | Twente Enschede | Wankdorf Stadium, Bern |
| | Staub 8' (1:0); Lüdi 57' (2:0) | FCZ summary | 83' (2:1) Gritter | Attendance: 5,000; Referee: (Switzerland) Franz Gächter (Aarau, Suhr, Aargau) |
Note: Philipps-Cup, game for third place.

| 9 August 1981 Exhibition game | Zürich | 0–3 | Liverpool | Letzigrund, Zürich |
| 20:00 | | FCZ summary | 42' (0:1) Dalglish; 77' (pen.) Neal; 90' (0:3) R. Kennedy | Attendance: 6,608; Referee: (Switzerland) Jean-Marie Macheret, (Rueyres-St-Laurent) |
Note: The match was originally scheduled for Saturday. Due to heavy rain, it was postponed until Sunday. Torrential rain began in the 60th minute and this lasted until the game was long finished.

| 12 August 1981 Exhibition game | FC Industrie Turicum | 0–6 | Zürich | Hardhof, Zürich |
| | | FCZ summary | 2' (0:1) Seiler; 9' (0:2) Jerković; 22' (0:3) Lüdi; 35' (0:4) Scheiwiler; 38' (0:5) Seiler; 74' (0:6) Seiler | Attendance: 300; Referee: (Switzerland) Bürki, (Zürich) |

| 18 August 1981 Exhibition game | FC Dietikon | 0–11 | Zürich | Fussballplatz Dornau, Dietikon |
| | | FCZ summary | (0:1) Seiler (0:2) Seiler (0:3) Seiler (0:4) Jerković (0:5) Jerković (0:6) Jerković (0:7) Elsener (0:8) Elsener (0:9) Scheiwiler (0:10) Scheiwiler (0:11) Landolt |

==== Winter break and late season ====
| 24 January 1982 Exhibition game | Cameroon | 3–0 | Zürich | Douala |
| | Kundé 53' (1:0); Kundé 62' (2:0); Eyobo 80' (3:0) | FCZ summary | | Attendance: 40,000 |

| 27 January 1982 Exhibition game | Cameroon | 3–0 | Zürich | Yaoundé |
| | Goal | FCZ summary | | Attendance: 25,000 |

| 31 January 1982 Exhibition game | Semassi | 1–3 | Zürich | Lomé |
| | Goal | FCZ summary | (0:1) Lüdi (0:2) Zwicker (0:3) Elsener | Attendance: 15,000 |
Note: Semassi was the reigning national champion in 1982.

| 3 February 1982 Exhibition game | Agaza | 1–3 | Zürich | Lomé |
| | Goal | FCZ summary | (0:1) Zwicker (0:2) Seiler (0:3) Zwicker | Attendance: 16,000 |

| 5 February 1982 Exhibition game | Aiglons (football club) | 3–1 | Zürich | Lomé |
| | Goal | FCZ summary | Zwicker | Attendance: 4,000 |

| 13 February 1982 Exhibition game | FC Bern | 0–5 | Zürich | Stadion Neufeld, Bern |
| | | FCZ summary | 2' (0:1) Schönenberger; 12' (0:2) Seiler; 15' (0:3) Seiler; 33' (0:4) Erba; 75' (0:5) Zwicker | Attendance: 500; Referee: (Switzerland) Werner Liebi (Thun) |

| 14 February 1982 Exhibition game | FC Nordstern Basel | 0–0 | Zürich | Rankhof, Basel |
| | | FCZ summary | | Attendance: 350; Referee: (Switzerland) Plattmann (Zeinigen) |

| 20 February 1982 Exhibition game | Xamax | 0–2 | Zürich | Payerne |
| | | FCZ summary | 36' (0:1) Seiler; 61' (0:2) Seiler | Attendance: 1,200; Referee: (Switzerland) Roland Chapuis, (Courtételle) |
Note: Snow-covered pitch

| 21 February 1982 Exhibition game | FC Frauenfeld | 0–3 | Zürich | Kleine Allmend, Frauenfeld |
| | | FCZ summary | 25' (0:1) Kurz; 60' (0:2) Seiler; 67' (0:3) Jerković | Attendance: 400; Referee: (Switzerland) Sutter (Wil) |

| 18 May 1982 Exhibition game | FC Döttingen | 0–2 | Zürich | Döttingen |
| | | FCZ summary | 30' (0:1) Zwicker; 70' (0:2) Schönenberger | Attendance: 600; Referee: (Switzerland) Hauser (Oberengstringen) |
Note: Döttingen played in the 3. Liga (fifth-tier) in 1981–/82 season. Charity match for the Kleindöttingen Work Center for the Disabled.

| 28 May 1982 Exhibition game | FC Ibach | 1–3 | Zürich | Gerbihof, Ibach |
| | Fessler 44' (1:0) | FCZ summary | 49' (1:1) Baur; 69' (1:2) Seiler; 87' (1:3) Seiler |
Note: FCZ played with a number of test players

== Sources and references ==
- dbFCZ Homepage
- Switzerland 1981–82 at RSSSF
- Swiss League Cup at RSSSF

| Preceded by 1980–81 | FC Zürich seasons | Succeeded by 1982–83 |
