= 1977–78 Grasshopper Club Zurich season =

Grasshopper Club Zurich
1977-78 season
- Manager: Helmuth Johannsen
- Stadium: Hardturm
- Nationalliga A: 1st
- Swiss Cup: Runners-up
- Swiss League Cup: Runners-up
- UEFA Cup: Semi-finals
- Intertoto Cup: Group stage
- Top goalscorer: League: Rudolf Elsener; Claudio Sulser (16 goals); All: Raimondo Ponte (34 goals)

In the 1977-78 Swiss football season, Grasshopper Club Zurich won the Nationalliga A, reached the finals of the Swiss Cup and Swiss League Cup, losing to Servette and St. Gallen respectively. They also reached the semi-finals of the UEFA Cup, only to lose to Bastia. GC played their home games in the Hardturm in Zurich

== Squad ==
The following is the list of the GC first team squad this season. It also includes players that were in the squad the day the season started on 13 August 1977, but subsequently left the club after that date.

Note: Flags indicate national team as defined under FIFA eligibility rules; some limited exceptions apply. Players may hold more than one non-FIFA nationality.

No.	Pos.	Nation	Player
—	GK	SUI	Roger Berbig
—	DF	SUI	Richard Bauer
—	DF	SUI	André Egli
—	DF	GER	Jonny Hey
—	DF	SUI	Bigi Meyer
—	DF	SUI	Francis Montandon
—	DF	SUI	René Nafzger
—	DF	SUI	Thomas Niggl

No.	Pos.	Nation	Player
—	DF	SUI	Roger Wehrli
—	MF	SUI	Alphons Bosco
—	MF	SUI	Heinz Hermann
—	MF	SUI	Raimondo Ponte
—	FW	SUI	Hansjörg Bänziger
—	FW	SUI	Kurt Becker
—	FW	MAR	Oscar Bouli
—	FW	SUI	Rudolf Elsener
—	FW	SUI	Claudio Sulser

== Competitions ==
=== Nationalliga A ===
==== Qualifying phase matches ====
13 August 1977 Round 1	St. Gallen	2-6	Grasshopper Club	Espenmoos, St. Gallen
	Schneeberger 10'; Müller 87'		Sulser 17'; Hey 28', 75'; Wehrli 71', 78'; Bauer 85'

20 August 1977 Round 2	Grasshopper Club	3-0	Sion	Hardturm, Zürich
	Meier 43'; Sulser 55'; Ponte 81'

23 August 1977 Round 3	Grasshopper Club	0–1	Basel	Hardturm, Zürich
20:00	Ponte (yellow card)	Summary	46' (0:1) Schönenberger; (yellow card) Tanner	Attendance: 10,300; Referee: (Switzerland) André Daina (Éclépens)

27 August 1977 Round 4	Lausanne-Sports	1-0	Grasshopper Club	Stade Olympique de la Pontaise, Lausanne
	Charvoz 46'

3 September 1977 Round 5	Young Boys	1-4	Grasshopper Club	Wankdorf Stadium, Bern
	Leuzinger 33'		Ponte 45'; Meier 46'; Hermann 70'; Sulser 83'

17 September 1977 Round 6	Grasshopper Club	5-1	Chênois	Hardturm, Zürich
	Bauer 21' (pen.); Meier 22'; Ponte 48'; Wehrli 66'; Sulser 87'		Yaghcha 67'

24 September 1977 Round 7	Étoile Carouge	2-3	Grasshopper Club	Stade de la Fontenette, Carouge
	Parini 63', 78'		Bauer 34' (pen.); Elsener 37'; Sulser 67'

1 October 1977 Round 8	Grasshopper Club	1-1	Young Fellows Zürich	Hardturm, Zürich
	Bauer 55' (pen.)		Hegi 4'

8 October 1977 Round 9	Xamax	2-3	Grasshopper Club	Stade de la Maladière, Neuchâtel
	Katić 83', 86'		Sulser 12', 32'; Bauer 34'

15 October 1977 Round 10	Grasshopper Club	7–2	Zürich	Hardturm, Zürich
	Bauer 33' (1:1); Bauer (penalty missed) 44′ Bauer 45' (2:2) (Torstensson) 66' (o.g.); Becker 68' (4:2); Sulser 74' (5:2); Elsener 80' (6:2); Hey 86' (7:2)	FCZ summary	14' (0:1) Risi; 38' (1:2) Cucinotta	Attendance: 13,000; Referee: (Switzerland) Ernst Dörflinger (Grenchen and Basel)
Note: Corners: 4:12. 44th minute, Grob saved penalty from Bauer, who then converted the rebound. Berbig saved penalty from Cucinotta.

22 October 1977 Round 11	Servette	2-2	Grasshopper Club	Stade des Charmilles, Geneva
	Barberis 44'; Wehrli 68' (o.g.)		Sulser 20'; Elsener 26'

25 October 1977 Round 12	Grasshopper Club	3-2	St. Gallen	Hardturm, Zürich
	Becker 3'; Meier 28'; Elsener 59'		Mogg 26'; Stöckl 65' (pen.)

5 November 1977 Round 13	Sion	2-2	Grasshopper Club	Stade de Tourbillon, Sion
	Luisier 28'; Perrier 72'		Elsener 17'; Hey 71'

12 November 1977 Round 14	Grasshopper Club	2-0	Lausanne-Sports	Hardturm, Zürich
	Elsener 4', 60'

19 November 1977 Round 15	Grasshopper Club	3-0	Young Boys	Hardturm, Zürich
	Sulser 63'; Wehrli 84'; Hey 90'

26 November 1977 Round 16	Chênois	1-3	Grasshopper Club	Stade des Trois-Chêne, Thônex
	Tachet 22'		Bauer 73'; Hey 81'; Becker 86'

3 December 1977 Round 17	Grasshopper Club	3-2	Étoile Carouge	Hardturm, Zürich
	Ponte 3', 6', 58'		Parini 23', 70'

11 December 1977 Round 18	Young Fellows Zürich	1-1	Grasshopper Club	Utogrund, Zürich
	Stomeo 56'		Elsener 68'

5 March 1978 Round 20	Zürich	1–2	Grasshopper Club	Letzigrund, Zürich
	Scheiwiler 44' (1:1)	FCZ summary	6' (0:1) Sulser; 56' (1:2) Bosco	Attendance: 12,500; Referee: (Switzerland) Bruno Galler (Kirchdorf, Bern)

11 March 1978 Round 19	Grasshopper Club	2-0	Xamax	Hardturm, Zürich
	Becker 30'; Hermann 85'

19 March 1978 Round 21	Grasshopper Club	0-1	Servette	Hardturm, Zürich
			Thouvenel 28'

22 March 1978 Round 22	Basel	2–5	Grasshopper Club	St. Jakob Stadium, Basel
20:00	Maissen 6' (1:0); Tanner 85' (2:4)	Summary	20' (1:1) Sulser; 20' (1:2) Sulser; 75' (1:3) Elsener; 81' (1:4) Sulser; 88' (2:5) Elsener; (yellow card) Becker	Attendance: 14,500; Referee: (Switzerland) André Daina (Éclépens)

==== Qualifying phase table ====
Pos	Team	Pld	W	D	L	GF	GA	GD	Pts	Qualification
1	Grasshopper Club	22	15	4	3	60	27	+33	34	To championship round
2	Servette	22	14	5	3	44	20	+24	33	To championship round
3	Lausanne-Sport	22	13	4	5	47	21	+26	30	To championship round
4	Basel	22	12	4	6	53	34	+19	28	To championship round
5	FC Zürich	22	11	6	5	38	27	+11	28	To championship round
6	Sion	22	6	9	7	29	33	−4	21	To championship round
7	Xamax	22	8	3	11	32	42	−10	19	To relegation play-out round
8	Young Boys	22	7	5	10	27	45	−18	19	To relegation play-out round
9	Chênois	22	8	2	12	27	35	−8	18	To relegation play-out round
10	St. Gallen	22	5	7	10	27	38	−11	17	To relegation play-out round
11	Étoile Carouge	22	5	3	14	22	40	−18	13	To relegation play-out round
12	Young Fellows Zürich	22	1	2	19	14	58	−44	4	To relegation play-out round

Source: rsssf.com
Rules for classification: 1) Points; 2) Goal difference; 3) Goals scored;

==== Championship matches ====
1 April 1978 Round 1	Sion	1-1	Grasshopper Club	Stade de Tourbillon, Switzerland
	Djordjic 62'		Hermann 47'

8 April 1978 Round 2	Grasshopper Club	0-0	Lausanne-Sports	Hardturm, Zürich

15 April 1978 Round 3	Zürich	1–3	Grasshopper Club	Letzigrund, Zürich
	Botteron 22' (1:1)	FCZ summary	6' (0:1) Hermann; 14' (0:2) Ponte; 88' (1:3) Elsener; (yellow card) 14' (yellow-red card) 89' Chapuisat	Attendance: 10,000; Referee: (Switzerland) Hans Wolfer (Volketswil)

19 April 1978 Round 4	Grasshopper Club	1-1	Servette	Hardturm, Zürich
	Ponte 41'		Peterhaus 52'

22 April 1978 Round 5	Basel	2–0	Grasshopper Club	St. Jakob Stadium, Basel
20:00	Stohler 30' (pen. 1:0); Marti 57' (2:0)	Summary	(yellow card) Elsener	Attendance: 21,500; Referee: (Switzerland) Rudolf Renggli (Stans and Luzern)

29 April 1978 Round 6	Grasshopper Club	4-1	Sion	Hardturm, Zürich
	Sulser 6', 66', 90'; Ponte 85'		Sarrasin 40'

6 May 1978 Round 7	Lausanne-Sports	4-3	Grasshopper Club	Stade Olympique de la Pontaise, Lausanne
	Gross 30', 39'; Guillaume 45', 67'		Ponte 9', 80' (pen.); Elsener 85'

20 May 1978 Round 8	Grasshopper Club	1–0	Zürich	Hardturm, Zürich
	Grob (yellow card) 83'	FCZ summary	81' (0:1) Montandon	Attendance: 12,500; Referee: (Switzerland) André Daina (Éclépens)

24 May 1978 Round 9	Servette	0-0	Grasshopper Club	Stade des Charmilles, Geneva

27 May 1978 Round 10	Grasshopper Club	4–2	Basel	Hardturm, Zürich
20:15	Sulser 39' (1:0); Ponte 54' (2:2); Elsener 77' (3:2); Elsener 90' (4:2); T. Niggl (yellow card)	Summary	43' (1:1) Tanner; 50' (1:2) Tanner; (yellow card) Küng; (yellow card) Demarmels	Attendance: 25,000; Referee: (Switzerland) Walter Hungerbühler (St. Gallen)

==== Championship table ====
Pos	Team	Pld	W	D	L	GF	GA	GD	BP	Pts	Qualification
1	Grasshopper Club	10	4	4	2	17	12	+5	17	29	Swiss Champions, qualified for 1978–79 European Cup and entered 1978 Intertoto Cup
2	Servette	10	3	5	2	10	10	0	17	28	Swiss Cup winners, qualified for 1978–79 Cup Winners' Cup
3	Basel	10	5	3	2	21	14	+7	14	27	Qualified for 1978–79 UEFA Cup
4	Lausanne-Sport	10	4	3	3	21	14	+7	15	26	Qualified for 1978–79 UEFA Cup
5	Zürich	10	5	2	3	15	15	0	14	26	Entered 1978 Intertoto Cup
6	Sion	10	0	1	9	8	27	−19	11	12	Entered 1978 Intertoto Cup

Source: rsssf.com
Rules for classification: 1) Points; 2) Goal difference; 3) Goals scored;

=== Swiss Cup ===
10 September 1977 Round 4	Laufen	0-4	Grasshopper Club	Nau, Laufen
			Bauer 47', 74' (pen.); Sulser 74'; Hermann 84'

12 October 1977 Round 5	Zug	0-7	Grasshopper Club	Herti-Allmend, Zug
			Ponte 18'; Meyer 46'; Bauer 55', 58' (pen.); Hey 72', 85'; Becker 87'

9 November 1977 Quarter-final	Grasshopper Club	2-0	Bulle	Hardturm, Zürich
	Ponte 47'; Hey 80'

2 May 1978 Semi-final	Grasshopper Club	5–1	Basel	Hardturm, Zürich
20:00	Bauer 12' (1:1); Sulser 49' (2:1); Hermann 53' (3:1); Elsener 62' (4:1); Ponte 88' (5:1); Niggl (yellow card)	FCB summary	4' (0:1) Lauscher; (yellow card) Lauscher	Attendance: 9,000; Referee: (Switzerland) Jakob Baumann (Schaffhausen)

15 May 1978 Final	Servette	2–2 (a.e.t.)	Grasshopper Club	Wankdorf Stadium, Bern
15:00	Peterhans 7'; Barberis 65'	Fussball-Schweiz summary	Ponte 60'; Elsener 63'	Attendance: 33,000; Referee: (Switzerland) Walter Hungerbühler (St. Gallen)

4 June 1978 Final (replay)	Servette	1–0	Grasshopper Club	Wankdorf Stadium, Bern
15:00	Thouvenel 17'	Fussball-Schweiz summary		Attendance: 18,000; Referee: (Switzerland) Ernst Dörflinger (Grenchen)

=== Swiss League Cup ===
6 August 1977 First round	Frauenfeld	0-7	Grasshopper Club

12 February 1978 Second round	Nordstern Basel	0-2	Grasshopper Club

25 April 1978 Quarter-final	Grasshopper Club	8-0	La Chaux-de-Fonds	Hardturm, Zürich
	Bouli 9', 13'; Wehrli 33'; Hey 70'; Ponte 77', 87', 89'; Elsener 81'

9 May 1978 Semi-final	Grasshopper Club	5–1	Zürich	Hardturm, Zürich
	Ponte 13' (1:0); Ponte 43' (2:0); Bosco 68' (3:0); Ponte 70' (4:0); Hey 75' (5:0)	summary	(yellow card) 70' Chapuisat; 88' (5:1) Zwicker	Attendance: 3,700; Referee: (Switzerland) Jean Dubach (Nidau)

15 August 1978 Final	St. Gallen	3–2	Grasshopper Club	Schützenwiese, Winterthur
	Labhart 6', 60'; Müller 80'		Nafzger 19'; Wehrli 61'	Attendance: 3,500; Referee: Bruno Della Bruna

=== UEFA Cup ===
14 September 1977 First round	BK Frem (Denmark)	0–2	(Switzerland) Grasshopper Club	Valby Idrætspark, Copenhagen
		Report	Elsener 34'; Becker 39'	Attendance: 1,956; Referee: Jan Redelfs (West Germany)

28 September 1977 First round	Grasshopper Club (Switzerland)	6–1	(Denmark) BK Frem	Hardturm, Zürich
	Meyer 7', 70'; Becker 40'; Elsener 57'; Ponte 82', 83'	Report	Mikkelsen 45'	Attendance: 3,400; Referee: Horst Brummeier (Austria)

19 October 1977 Second round	Inter Bratislava (Czechoslovakia)	1–0	(Switzerland) Grasshopper Club	Tehelné pole, Bratislava
	Bauer 83' (o.g.)	Report		Attendance: 4,600; Referee: William Gow (Wales)

2 November 1977 Second round	Grasshopper Club (Switzerland)	5–1	(Czechoslovakia) Inter Bratislava	Hardturm, Zürich
	Elsener 3', 35'; Ponte 40'; Sulser 60'; Hey 80'	Report	Jurkemik 75'	Attendance: 5,500; Referee: Jan Beck (Netherlands)

23 November 1977 Third round	Dinamo Tbilisi (Soviet Union)	1–0	(Switzerland) Grasshopper Club	Dinamo Stadium, Tbilisi
	Shengelia 20'	Report		Attendance: 75,000; Referee: Rolf Nyhus (Norway)

7 December 1977 Third round	Grasshopper Club (Switzerland)	4–0	(Soviet Union) Dinamo Tbilisi	Hardturm, Zürich
	Sulser 14'; Ponte 46' (pen.), 77'; Elsener 90+1'	Report		Attendance: 17,000; Referee: Michel Kitabdjian (France)

1 March 1978 Quarter-finals	Eintracht Frankfurt (West Germany)	3–2	(Switzerland) Grasshopper Club	Waldstadion, Frankfurt
	Kraus 58'; Hölzenbein 68', 90' (pen.)	Report	Bosco 36'; Ponte 52' (pen.)	Attendance: 14,000; Referee: Erich Linemayr (Austria)

14 March 1978 Quarter-finals	Grasshopper Club (Switzerland)	1–0	(West Germany) Eintracht Frankfurt	Hardturm, Zürich
	Ponte 33' (pen.)	Report		Attendance: 30,000; Referee: Dušan Maksimović (Yugoslavia)

29 March 1978 Semi-finals	Grasshopper Club (Switzerland)	3–2	(France) Bastia	Hardturm, Zürich
	Hermann 22'; Ponte 31' (pen.); Montandon 54'	Report	Krimau 18'; Papi 37' (pen.)	Attendance: 29,000; Referee: John Carpenter (Republic of Ireland)

12 April 1978 Semi-finals	Bastia (France)	1–0	(Switzerland) Grasshopper Club	Stade Armand-Cesari, Furiani
	Papi 67'	Report		Attendance: 11,000; Referee: Pat Partridge (England)

=== Intertoto Cup ===
==== Group 4 ====
Pos	Team	Pld	W	D	L	GF	GA	GD	Pts	SLA	MAL	HAM	GCZ
1	(Bulgaria) Slavia Sofia	6	5	0	1	13	7	+6	10	—	1–0	3–0	2–1
2	(Sweden) Malmö FF	6	3	2	1	12	4	+8	8	3–0	—	5–0	1–0
3	(West Germany) Hamburg	6	2	1	3	11	15	−4	5	2–3	2–2	—	4–1
4	(Switzerland) Grasshopper Club	6	0	1	5	5	15	−10	1	1–4	1–1	1–3	—

Source: mogiel.net
Rules for classification: 1) Points; 2) Goal difference; 3) Goals scored; 4) Head-to-head points; 5) Away goals scored; 6) Draw.
