= 1983–84 Swiss Cup =

Tournament details
- Country: Switzerland

Final positions
- Champions: Servette
- Runners-up: Lausanne-Sport

The 1983–84 Swiss Cup was the 59th season of Switzerland's annual football cup competition.

== Overview ==
The competition began on 29 July 1983 with the first games of the first round and was completed on Whit Monday 11 June 1984 with the final, which was held at the former Wankdorf Stadium in Bern. The teams from the Nationalliga B were granted byes for the first round. The games of the second round were played on the weekend 6 and 7 of August. The teams from the Nationalliga A were granted byes for the first two rounds. The matches were played in a knockout format. Up until the quarter-finals, in the event of a draw at the end of extra time, the match was decided with a penalty shoot-out. In and after the quarter-finals replays were foreseen and this was played on the visiting team's pitch. The winners of the cup qualified themselves for the first round of the Cup Winners' Cup in the next season.

== Round 3 ==
The teams from the NLA joined the cup competition in the third round. The draw was respecting regionalities, whenever possible, and the lower classed team was granted home advantage.

=== Summary ===
| Team 1 | Score | Team 2 |
|---|---|---|
10 September 1983
| Emmenbrücke | 1–6 | Wettingen |
| Köniz | 0–2 | Young Boys |
| Ibach | 1–5 (a.e.t.) | Zürich |
| Martigny-Sports | 1–2 | Servette |
| FC Gerlafingen | 0–5 | Laufen |
| FC Turicum ZH | 0–5 | St. Gallen |
| FC Arbon | 0–6 | Grasshopper Club |
| Bulle | 8–1 | FC Saint-Légier |
| FC Altstätten (St. Gallen) | 1–3 | Red Star |
| Buochs | 3–2 | FC Allschwil |
| Baden | 6–2 (a.e.t.) | Concordia |
| Chênois | 3–3 (a.e.t.) (3–4 p) | Sion |
| Biel-Bienne | 7–2 | Monthey |
| FC Birsfelden | 0–8 | Basel |
| Moutier | 0–2 | Grenchen |
| Winterthur | 3–1 (a.e.t.) | Lugano |
| Fribourg | 6–2 | ES Malley |
| Stade Lausanne | 1–2 | Vevey Sports |
| Locarno | 3–3 (a.e.t.) * abd | Kreuzlingen |
11 September 1983
| FC Rapid Ostermundigen | 0–2 | Nordstern |
| FC Suhr | 3–1 | FC Klus-Balsthal |
| FC Fétigny | 2–4 | FC Aurore Bienne |
| FC Embrach | 2–3 | Chiasso |
| Mendrisio | 2–0 (a.e.t.) | Bellinzona |
| Charmey | 1–13 | Lausanne-Sport |
| FC Amriswil | 3–0 | Gossau |
| SC Derendingen | 0–1 | Aarau |
| Montreux-Sports | 1–2 | Neuchâtel Xamax |
| Étoile-Sporting | 0–3 | US Boncourt |
| FC Tresa/Monteggio | 2–3 (a.e.t.) | US Morobbia Giubiasco |
| Stade Nyonnais | 0–5 | La Chaux-de-Fonds |
| SC Zug | 1–2 | Luzern |

- Note: the match Locarno-Kreuzlingen was abandoned after 120 minutes due to rain, before the penalty shoot-out. It was replayed.

Replay

| Team 1 | Score | Team 2 |
|---|---|---|
21 September 1983
| Locarno | 2–3 (a.e.t.) | Kreuzlingen |

=== Matches ===
10 September 1983

| Köniz | 0–2 | Young Boys |
|---|---|---|
| | YB summary | 73' Nickel; 81' Reich |

Sportplatz Liebefeld-Hessgut, Köniz
Attendance: 1,900

10 September 1983

| Ibach | 1–5 (a.e.t.) | Zürich |
|---|---|---|
| Waltenspühl 37'; Büeler (yellow card) 85'; Ruhstaller (yellow card) 104' | FCZ summary | 50' (o.g.) Schmidig; 101' Bold; 105' Bold; 110' Bold; 116' Rufer; (yellow card) 104' Rufer |

Gerbihof, Ibach
Attendance: 1,300
Referee: (Switzerland) Arturo Martino (Neukirch an der Thur)

10 September 1983

| Martigny-Sports | 1–2 | Servette |
|---|---|---|
| Goal | Servette summary | Barberis; Elia |

Stade d'Octodure, Martigny

10 September 1983
20:00

| FC Birsfelden | 0–8 | Basel |
|---|---|---|
| | FCB summary | 12' (0:1) Dreher; 13' (0:2) Jeitziner; 15' (0:3) Maissen; 30' (0:4) Jeitziner; 37' (0:5) Jeitziner; 54' (0:6) Sutter; 70' (0:7) Sutter; 80' (0:8) Jeitziner |

Sportplatz Sternenfeld, Birsfelden
Attendance: 1,600
Referee: (Switzerland) Rolf Blattmann

11 September 1983

| SC Derendingen | 0–1 | Aarau |
|---|---|---|
| | FCA summary | 11' Kaltaveridis |

Heidenegg, Derendingen
Attendance: 700
Referee: (Switzerland) Willi Jaus (Feldmeilen)

== Round 4 ==
=== Summary ===
| Team 1 | Score | Team 2 |
|---|---|---|
15 October 1983
| Aarau | 6–0 | FC Aurore Bienne |
| Biel-Bienne | 3–3 (a.e.t.) (3–4 p) | Laufen |
| Bulle | 3–0 | US Boncourt |
| St. Gallen | 2–0 | Winterthur |
| Red Star | 1–2 | Grasshopper Club |
| La Chaux-de-Fonds | 1–3 | Servette |
| Fribourg | 3–0 | Sion |
| Grenchen | 1–3 * abd | Neuchâtel Xamax |
16 October 1983
| FC Ascona | 5–0 | Buochs |
| Baden | 1–3 | Zürich |
| Kreuzlingen | 2–5 | Wettingen |
| Young Boys | 2–4 | Lausanne-Sport |
| Vevey Sports | 1–0 | Nordstern |
| Mendrisio | 3–0 | FC Suhr |
| US Morobbia Giubiasco | 0–1 | Chiasso |
| Basel | 0–3 | Luzern |

- Note: the match Grenchen-Neuchâtel Xamax was voided due to an arbitration error. It was replayed.

Replay

| Team 1 | Score | Team 2 |
|---|---|---|
20 March 1984
| Grenchen | 1–0 | Neuchâtel Xamax |

=== Matches ===
15 October 1983
16:30

| Aarau | 6–0 | FC Aurore Bienne |
|---|---|---|
| Herberth 27' (1:0); Herberth 43' (2:0); Hegi 45' (3:0); Herberth 46' (4:0); Kaltaveridis 65' (5:0); Seiler 85' (6:0) | FCA summary |

Stadion Brügglifeld, Aarau
Attendance: 1,200
Referee: (Switzerland) Willi Jaus (Feldmeilen)

15 October 1983
17:30

| La Chaux-de-Fonds | 1–3 | Servette |
|---|---|---|
| Goal | Servette summary | Barberis; 2x Jaccard |

Centre Sportif de la Charrière, La Chaux-de-Fonds

16 October 1983
14:30

| Baden | 1–3 | Zürich |
|---|---|---|
| Hadewicz 6' (1:1) | FCZ summary | 1' (0:1) Bold; 48' (1:2) Lüdi; (yellow card) 52' Landolt (1:3) Schneider |

Referee: (Switzerland) Alfred Heinis (Ammannsegg, Biberist)

16 October 1983
14:30

| Young Boys | 2–4 | Lausanne-Sport |
|---|---|---|
| Schmidlin 42' (1:2); Reich 45' (2:2) | YB summary | 2' (0:1) Kok; 26' (0:2) Seramondi; 75' (2:3) Kok; 79' (2:4) Pellegrini |

Wankdorf Stadium, Bern
Attendance: 4,300
Referee: (Switzerland) Willy Hänni

16 October 1983
16:00

| Basel | 0 – 3 | Luzern |
|---|---|---|
| | FCB summary | (yellow card) 6' Müller; (yellow card) 37' Martinelli; 51' (0:1) Fairclough; 74' (0:2) Fairclough; 75' (0:3) Fairclough; (yellow card) 77' Kaufmann |

St. Jakob Stadium, Basel
Attendance: 6,000
Referee: (Germany) Hans-Peter Dellwing Trier

== Round 5 ==
=== Summary ===
| Team 1 | Score | Team 2 |
|---|---|---|
31 March 1984
| FC Amriswil | 0–1 | Aarau |
| Servette | 4–2 | Sion |
| Luzern | 2–1 | Vevey Sports |
1 April 1984
| Grenchen | 0–2 | Lausanne-Sport |
| Laufen | 2–3 | Bulle |
| Mendrisio | 1–2 | Chiasso |
| St. Gallen | 2–1 | Grasshopper Club |
| Zürich | 5–1 | Wettingen |

=== Matches ===
31 March 1984
16:00

| FC Amriswil | 0–1 | Aarau |
|---|---|---|
| | FCA summary | 24' (o.g.) Varoglou |

Tellenfeld, Amriswil
Attendance: 2,000
Referee: (Switzerland) Gottlieb Barmettler (Luzern)

31 March 1984
20:00

| Servette | 4–2 | Sion |
|---|---|---|
| 2x Brigger; 1x Elia; 1x Geiger | Servette summary | Goal |

Stade des Charmilles, Geneva

1 April 1984

| Zürich | 5–1 | Wettingen |
|---|---|---|
| Elsener 12' (1:0); Graf 21' (o.g.); Jerković 32' (3:0); Lüdi 45' (pen.); Rufer 72' (5:1) | FCZ summary | 41' (pen.) Radaković |

Letzigrund, Zürich
Attendance: 3,500
Referee: (Switzerland) Manfred Schlup (Grenchen)

== Quarter-finals ==
=== Summary ===
| Team 1 | Score | Team 2 |
|---|---|---|
18 April 1984
| Servette | 5–0 | Chiasso |
23 April 1984
| Lausanne-Sport | 3–2 | Zürich |
| Luzern | 0–3 | Aarau |
| St. Gallen | 2–0 | Bulle |

=== Matches ===
18 April 1984
20:00

| Servette | 5–0 | Chiasso |
|---|---|---|
| 1x Henry; 2x Elia; 1x Brigger; 1x Brigger | Servette summary |

Stade des Charmilles, Geneva

23 April 1984
15:00

| Lausanne-Sport | 3–2 (a.e.t.) | Zürich |
|---|---|---|
| Andrey 24' (1:2); Andrey 27' (2:2); Andrey 111' (3:2) | FCZ summary | 10' (0:1) Jerković; 22' (0:2) Jerković |

Pontaise, Lausanne
Attendance: 15,000
Referee: (Switzerland) Renzo Peduzzi (Roveredo)

23 April 1984
17:00

| Luzern | 0–3 | Aarau |
|---|---|---|
| | FCA summary | 66' (0:1) Rietmann; 69' (0:2) Müller; 88' (0:3) Müller |

Stadion Allmend, Luzern
Attendance: 13,000
Referee: (Switzerland) André Daina (Éclépens)

== Semi-finals ==
=== Summary ===
| Team 1 | Score | Team 2 |
|---|---|---|
8 May 1984
| Aarau | 0–0 (a.e.t.) | Servette |
| Lausanne-Sport | 1–0 | St. Gallen |

Replay

| Team 1 | Score | Team 2 |
|---|---|---|
23 May 1984
| Servette | 1–0 | Aarau |

=== Matches ===
8 May 1984
20:00

| Aarau | 0–0 (a.e.t.) | Servette |
|---|---|---|
| | Servette summary FCA summary |

Stadion Brügglifeld, Aarau
Referee: (Switzerland) Jakob Baumann (Schaffhausen)

8 May 1984
20:30

| Lausanne-Sport | 1–0 | St. Gallen |
|---|---|---|
| Dario 27' | [ summary] |

Pontaise, Lausanne

23 May 1984
20:00

| Servette | 1–0 | Aarau |
|---|---|---|
| Decastel 88' (1:0) | Servette summary FCA summary |

Stade des Charmilles, Geneva
Attendance: 7,000
Referee: (Switzerland) Georges Sandoz (Corcelles-Cormondrèche, Neuchâtel)

== Final ==
The final was held at the former Wankdorf Stadium in Bern on Whit Monday 1984.

=== Summary ===
| Team 1 | Score | Team 2 |
|---|---|---|
11 June 1984
| Servette | 1–0 (a.e.t.) | Lausanne-Sport |

=== Telegram ===
11 June 1984
14:30

| Servette | 1–0 (a.e.t.) | Lausanne-Sport |
|---|---|---|
| Geiger 94' | Fussball-Schweiz summary |

Wankdorf Stadium, Bern
Attendance: 38,000
Referee: (Switzerland)

Servette won the cup and this was the club's sixth cup title to this date.

== Further in Swiss football ==
- 1983–84 Nationalliga A
- 1983–84 Swiss 1. Liga

== Sources ==
- Fussball-Schweiz
- 1983–84 at fcb-achiv.ch
- Switzerland 1983–84 at RSSSF

| Preceded by 1982–83 | Swiss Cup seasons | Succeeded by 1984–85 |
