= 1981–82 Swiss League Cup =

Tournament details
- Country: Switzerland
- Teams: 32

Final positions
- Champions: Aarau
- Runners-up: St. Gallen

Tournament statistics
- Matches played: 32

The 1981–82 Swiss League Cup was the tenth edition of the Swiss League Cup competition since its introduction in 1972. The first round was played in summer 1981 as a pre-season warm-up to the 1981–82 Swiss football season, round two in September and the later rounds were played after the winter-break. This was to be the last edition of this competition, as it was discontinued in the next season.

== Overview ==
The League Cup had been created nine years earlier to allow clubs from the top two tiers to compete in a tournament in advance of the league season, with the semi-finals and final played in the Autumn. However, this planning had been given up and modified. This season the modification from last season were continued, the first round was played in advance of the season, the second round was played in September and the later rounds were played in the spring.

The matches were played in a single knockout format. In the event of a draw after 90 minutes, the match went into extra time. In the event of a draw at the end of extra time, a penalty shoot-out was to decide which team qualified for the next round. No replays were foreseen. The final was to be played as a two legged affair with both finalists playing a home and an away game.

== First round ==
=== Summary ===
Team 1	Score	Team 2
1 August 1981
Frauenfeld	2–1	Ibach
Servette	2–1	Lausanne-Sport
Sion	2–0	Chênois
2 August 1981
FC Bern	1–2	Aarau
FC Aurore Bienne	1–6	Nordstern Basel
Fribourg	3–1	Bulle
Mendrisiostar	5–3	Bellinzona
Winterthur	2–2 (a.e.t.) (4–2 p)	Chiasso
Grenchen	4–0	Wettingen
Lugano	2–0	Locarno
4 August 1981
Basel	1–0	Young Boys
Monthey	1–2	Vevey-Sports
La Chaux-de-Fonds	2–0	Xamax
5 August 1981
FC Altstätten (St. Gallen)	0–3	Grasshopper Club
Luzern	7–0	Biel-Bienne
Zürich	0–1	St. Gallen

=== Matches ===
1 August 1981

Servette	2–1	Lausanne-Sport
Mustapha 47' (1:1); Coutaz 69' (2:1)	Servette summary	29' (0:1) Kok

Charmilles Stadium, Geneva

2 August 1981

FC Bern	1–2	Aarau
Getzmann 65' (1:2)	FCA summary	20' (0:1) Müller; Herberth 41' (0:2)

Stadion Neufeld, Bern
Attendance: 350
Referee: (Switzerland) Andreas Schluchter (Schönenbuch)

2 August 1981

FC Aurore Bienne	1–6	Nordstern Basel
Müller 79' (1:6)	RSSSF summary	17' (0:1) Sprunger; 34' (0:2) Sprunger; 43' (0:3) Sprunger; 59' (0:4) Zbinden; 60' (0:5) Schnell; 78' (0:6) Schnell

Stade de Champagne, Biel/Bienne
Attendance: 1,000
Referee: (Switzerland) Othmar Winter (Martigny)

4 August 1981
19:00

Basel	1–0	Young Boys
Sutter 63' (1:0)	FCB summary

St. Jakob Stadium, Basel
Attendance: 6,400
Referee: (Switzerland) Bruno Galler (Kirchdorf, Bern)

5 August 1981

FC Altstätten (St. Gallen)	0–3	Grasshopper Club
	RSSSF summary	31' (0:1) Egli; 33' (0:2) Koller; 60' (0:3) Fimian

Grüntal, Altstätten
Attendance: 3,500
Referee: (Switzerland) Rudolf Renggli (Luzern)

5 August 1981

Zürich	0–1	St. Gallen
	FCZ summary	61' (0:1) Sengör

Letzigrund, Zürich
Attendance: 1,732
Referee: (Switzerland) Marco Raveglia (San Vittore)

== Second round ==
=== Summary ===
Team 1	Score	Team 2
8 September 1981
Aarau	4–3 (a.e.t.)	Grasshopper Club
Fribourg	0–6	Servette
Vevey-Sports	0–1	La Chaux-de-Fonds
9 September 1981
Frauenfeld	1–3	Luzern
Nordstern Basel	3–1	Sion
Winterthur	1–0	Lugano
Grenchen	1–2	Basel
St. Gallen	4–2	Mendrisiostar

=== Matches ===
8 September 1981
20:00

Aarau	4–3 (a.e.t.)	Grasshopper Club
Tschuppert 1' (1:0); Hegi 60' (2:1); Da Costa 116' (3:3); Siegrist 119' (4:2)	FCA summary	50' (1:1) Meyer; 88' (2:2) Egli; 102' (2:3) Fimian

Sportanlage Trinermatten, Zofingen
Attendance: 2,700
Referee: (Switzerland) Gottlieb Barmettler (Luzern)

8 September 1981
20:15

Fribourg	0–6	Servette
	Servette summary	17' (0:1) Seramondi; 23' (0:2) Radi; 80' (0:3) Elia; 85' (0:4) Pleimelding; 87' (0:5) Favre; 90' (0:6) Elia

Stade Universitaire Saint-Léonard, Fribourg
Attendance: 2,800
Referee: (Switzerland) Fredy Philippoz

9 September 1981
20:00

Nordstern Basel	3–1	Sion
Kaelin 50' (1:0); Zbinden 82' (2:0); Schnell 85' (3:1)	RSSSF summary	83' (2:1) Cina

St. Jakob Stadium, Basel
Attendance: 700
Referee: (Switzerland) Arturo Martino (Neukirch an der Thur)

9 September 1981
20:00

Grenchen	1–2	Basel
Nüssing 62' (1:1)	FCB summary	3' (0:1) Stohler; 73' (1:2) Hasler

Stadium Brühl, Grenchen
Attendance: 2,400
Referee: (Switzerland) Willy Hänni

== Quarter-finals ==
=== Summary ===
Team 1	Score	Team 2
21 February 1982
Winterthur	1–1 (a.e.t.) (3–2 p)	La Chaux-de-Fonds
Aarau	1–0	Basel
Luzern	3–2	Nordstern Basel
Servette	1–2	St. Gallen

=== Matches ===
21 February 1982
15:00

Winterthur	1–1 (a.e.t.)	La Chaux-de-Fonds
Roth 16' (1:0)	RSSSF summary	50' (1:1) Mauron
Penalties
Penalty scored Penalty missed	3–2	Penalty scored Penalty missed

Schützenwiese, Winterthur
Attendance: 1,300
Referee: (Switzerland) Marino Paggiola

21 February 1982
15:00

Aarau	1–0	Basel
(Graf) 8' (o.g. 1:0)	FCA summary FCB summary

Stadion Brügglifeld, Aarau
Attendance: 3,500
Referee: (Switzerland) Willy Hänni (Cugy, Vaud)

21 February 1982

Luzern	3–2	Nordstern Basel
Rahmen 61' (1:2); Hitzfeld 68' (2:2); Fischer 70' (3:2)	RSSSF summary	52' (0:1) Grimm; 55' (0:2) Erlachner

Stadion Allmend, Luzern
Attendance: 1,500
Referee: (Switzerland) Manfred Schlup (Grenchen)

21 February 1982
14:30

Servette	1–2	St. Gallen
Favre 61' (pen. 1:1)	Servette summary	35' (0:1) Sengör; 68' (1:2) Frei

Charmilles Stadium, Geneva
Attendance: 2,250
Referee: Jean-Marie Macheret (Rueyres, Switzerland)

== Semi-finals ==
=== Summary ===
Team 1	Score	Team 2
11 May 1982
Aarau	4–1	Luzern
St. Gallen	1–1 (a.e.t.) (4–3 p)	Winterthur

=== Matches ===
11 May 1982

Aarau	4–1	Luzern
da Costa 51' (1:1); Zehnder 60' (2:1); Hegi 76' (3:1) da Costa 85' (4:1)	FCA summary	27' (0:1) Kaufmann

Stadion Brügglifeld, Aarau
Attendance: 3,143
Referee: (Switzerland) Rudolf Affolter

11 May 1982

St. Gallen	1–1 (a.e.t.)	Winterthur
Gisinger 94' (1:0)	RSSSF summary	104' (1:1) Roth
Penalties
Penalty scored	4–3	Penalty scored Penalty missed

Espenmoos, St. Gallen
Attendance: 2,000
Referee: (Switzerland) Rolf Blattmann (Zeiningen)

== Final ==
The first leg of the final was held at the Espenmoos in St. Gallen on 18 May and the return leg at the Stadion Brügglifeld in Aarau on 29 May 1982.

=== Summary ===
First leg

Team 1	Score	Team 2
18 May 1982
St. Gallen	0–1	Aarau

Second leg

Team 1	Score	Team 2
29 May 1982
Aarau	0–0	St. Gallen

Aarau won 1–0 on aggregate.

=== Telegram ===
18 May 1982

St. Gallen	0–1	Aarau
	FCA summary	75' (0:1) Rietmann

Espenmoos, St. Gallen
Attendance: 1,800
Referee: (Switzerland) Gottlieb Barmettler (Luzern)

29 May 1982

Aarau	0–0	St. Gallen
	FCA summary

Stadion Brügglifeld, Aarau
Attendance: 5,700
Referee: (Switzerland) Alfred Heinis (Ammannsegg, Biberist)

Aarau won the final 1–0 on aggregate and thus the cup and this was the club's first League Cup title. This was to be the last edition of this competition, as it was discontinued in the following season.

== Further in Swiss football ==
- 1981–82 Nationalliga A
- 1981–82 Swiss 1. Liga
- 1981–82 Swiss Cup
