= Michael Birkedal =

Danish footballer (born 1959)

Personal information
- Date of birth: 18 November 1959 (age 66)
- Place of birth: Copenhagen, Denmark
- Position: Midfielder

Senior career*
Years	Team	Apps	(Gls)
-1979	Slagelse B&I		
1979-1981	Næstved Boldklub		
1981-1986	FC Twente	92	(6)
1986-1988	Ikast FS		
1988-1989	FC La Chaux-de-Fonds		
1989-1990	Slagelse B&I		

International career
1982	Denmark	1	(0)
- * Club domestic league appearances and goals

Michael Birkedal (born 18 November 1959) is a Danish retired footballer.
