= Mongi Ben Brahim =

Tunisian footballer (born 1955)

Personal information
- Date of birth: 3 February 1955 (age 71)
- Position: Forward

Senior career*
Years	Team	Apps	(Gls)
1978–1983	FC La Chaux-de-Fonds		
1983–1984	FC Sion		
1984–1985	Young Boys		
1985–1987	Vevey Sports		
1987–1989	FC Martigny-Sports		
- * Club domestic league appearances and goals

Mongi Ben Brahim (born 3 February 1955) is a Tunisian former professional footballer who played as a forward.
