= Roger Berbig =

Swiss footballer (born 1954)

Personal information
- Full name: Roger Berbig
- Date of birth: 6 November 1954 (age 71)
- Place of birth: Zürich, Switzerland
- Height: 1.91 m (6 ft 3 in)
- Position: Goalkeeper

Senior career*
Years	Team	Apps	(Gls)
1971–1984	Grasshoppers Zürich	218	(1)

International career
1978–1984	Switzerland	18	(0)
- * Club domestic league appearances and goals

Roger Berbig (born 6 November 1954) is a retired football goalkeeper.

During his club career, Berbig played solely for Grasshoppers Zürich where he won 4 Swiss championships and reached the semi-finals of the UEFA Cup in 1977/78. He was club captain between 1982–84 and lead the team to 3 successive championship titles.

He also played for the Switzerland national football team.
