= Étienne Delangre =

Belgian football manager

Etienne Delangre
Personal information
- Date of birth: 12 February 1963 (age 63)
- Place of birth: Martelange, Belgium
- Position: Defender

Senior career*
| Years | Team | Apps | (Gls) |
| 1981–1992 | Standard Liège | | |
| 1992–1994 | RWD Molenbeek | | |
| 1994–1995 | Francs Borains | | |
| 1995–1996 | Avenir Beggen | | |
| 1997–1998 | Seraing RUL | | |

Managerial career
- 1997–1998: Seraing RUL
- 1999–2000: Wallonia Walhain
- 2002: Charleroi
- 2004–2005: Sprimont Comblain
- 2006–2007: Verviétois
- 2008–2009: Spa
- 2010: Verlaine
- 2011: Union Namur
- 2014–2015: Standard Liège (assistant)
- 2015–2018: Royal Star Fléron
- 2020–2022: Tilff
- * Club domestic league appearances and goals

Etienne Delangre (born 12 February 1963) is a Belgian former football player and manager who played as a defender.

During a long career with Standard Liège, he played in Europe as well as three cup finals. Among various coaching jobs, he was also assistant manager of Standard Liège from 2014 to 2015. When fired by lowly club Royal Star Fléron in November 2018, players went on a strike. After that, he managed Tilff.
