= Werner Reich =

German-American engineer and Holocaust survivor

- Born: 1 October 1927; Berlin, Germany
- Died: 8 July 2022; Smithtown, New York
- Spouse: Eva Schiff
- Engineering career
- Institutions: City College, New York
- Employer: Nabisco

Werner Reich (1927–2022) was a Holocaust survivor, an engineer, magician, and author. Reich was captured and sent to a concentration camp when he was 15. At Auschwitz, he was selected by Josef Mengele for labor rather than execution. There, he shared barracks with the magician Herbert Levin (the Great Nivelli). After the war, Reich emigrated to England and later New York, where he studied engineering at night school. He became a structural engineer, performed magic tricks at parties and events, and gave talks about his Holocaust experience. In 2020, he delivered the popular TEDTalk, "How the magic of kindness helped me survive the Holocaust".

== Early life ==
Reich was born in Berlin on 1 October 1927. His father, Wilhelm was an engineer, and his mother Elly (née Dux) Reich was a nurse who had been awarded an Iron Cross for her service during World War I. Reich had an older sister, Renate.

The family left Germany in 1933, shortly after the Nazis came to power, and moved to Zagreb. In 1940, Reich's father died of kidney disease and, in 1941, Yugoslavia was invaded by the Nazis.

== Holocaust ==
Reich was captured at the age of 15 for his involvement with the resistance. He was imprisoned in several concentration camps, including Theresienstadt, Auschwitz, and Mauthausen. Reich was freed when Mauthausen was liberated in May 1945.

While at Birkenau, he was selected by Josef Mengele for labor rather than immediate execution. There, one of the men in his barracks, was Herbert Levin. Levin had been a professional magician before the war, who went by the name the Great Nivelli or Nivelli the magician. Levin taught Reich a card trick, which would help him survive the war, and would later inspire him to become a magician himself.

== After the war ==
After the war, Reich returned to Yugoslavia for two years before moving to England. There he married Eva Schiff, who had arrived in England on the Kindertransport. In 1955, they moved to New York City. Reich attended night school at City College of New York and became a structural engineer.

In the US, Reich performed magic tricks at parties. As a Holocaust survivor, he gave talks about his experience. In 2020, he delivered a TEDTalk.

== Personal life and death ==
Reich died on July 8, 2022 in Smithtown, New York. He was 94. He had been predeceased by his sister Renate in 1999 and his wife died in 2016. Reich had two sons, David and Mikal.

In 2023, his portrait was one of 90 Holocaust survivors featured in the photography exhibition “Invited to Life: Finding Hope After the Holocaust” by B. A. Van Sise.
