= Jonny Hey =

German footballer

Personal information
- Date of birth: 21 September 1949 (age 77)
- Height: 1.77 m (5 ft 10 in)
- Position: Midfielder

Senior career*
Years	Team	Apps	(Gls)
1968–1970	Wacker 04 Berlin		
1970–1972	Blau-Weiß 1890 Berlin		
1972–1973	MSV Duisburg		
1974–1977	Arminia Bielefeld		
1977–1979	Grasshoppers		
1979–1980	Fortuna Köln		
1980–1983	Wuppertaler SV		

Managerial career
- 1982–1983: Wuppertaler SV
- * Club domestic league appearances and goals

Jonny Hey (born 21 September 1949) is a German former professional football player and coach.

== Career ==
Hey played as a midfielder for MSV Duisburg, Arminia Bielefeld, Grasshopper Club Zürich, Fortuna Köln and Wuppertaler SV, who he also managed.

== Personal life ==
His son is Antoine Hey, also a footballer.
