= Martin Gisinger =

Austrian footballer

Personal information
- Date of birth: 21 June 1955 (age 71)
- Place of birth: Austria
- Position: Midfielder

Senior career*
Years	Team	Apps	(Gls)
–1977	FC Dornbirn 1913		
1977–1985	FC St. Gallen		
1985–1986	FC Vaduz		

International career
1983–1985	Austria	7	(2)
- * Club domestic league appearances and goals

Martin Gisinger (born 21 June 1955) is a retired football midfielder from Austria. During his club career, Gisinger played for FC Dornbirn 1913, FC St. Gallen and FC Vaduz.
