= Thomas Staub =

Swiss footballer (born 1955)

Personal information
- Date of birth: 22 July 1955 (age 71)
- Position: Defender

Senior career*
Years	Team	Apps	(Gls)
1976–1981	FC Frauenfeld		
1981–1982	FC Zürich		
1982–1985	FC Aarau		
1985–1988	FC Winterthur		

Managerial career
- 2002: FC St. Gallen (caretaker manager)
- 2008–2012: FC Frauenfeld
- * Club domestic league appearances and goals

Thomas Staub (born 22 July 1955) is a retired Swiss football defender.
