= Walter Iselin =

Swiss footballer (born 1953)

Personal information
- Date of birth: 21 September 1953 (age 73)
- Place of birth: Zürich, Switzerland
- Position: Midfielder

Senior career*
Years	Team	Apps	(Gls)
1972–1975	FC Zürich		
1976	FC Gossau		
1978–1980	FC Chiasso		
1980–1984	FC Zürich		
1984–1987	FC Aarau		
1987–1988	FC Baden		

Managerial career
- 1989: FC Zürich
- 1993–1994: FC Wil 1900
- 1994–1997: FC Schaffhausen
- * Club domestic league appearances and goals

Walter Iselin (born 21 September 1953) is a retired Swiss football midfielder and later manager.
