= Lohn-Ammannsegg =

- Municipality
- Coat of arms
- Location of Lohn-Ammannsegg
- Location within Switzerland Location within Canton of Solothurn
- Coordinates: 47°10′N 7°32′E
- Country: Switzerland
- Canton: Solothurn
- District: Wasseramt

Area
  - Total: 4.45 km^{2} (1.72 sq mi)
- Elevation: 500 m (1,600 ft)

Population (December 2020)
  - Total: 2,870
  - Density: 645/km^{2} (1,670/sq mi)
- Time zone: UTC+01:00 (CET)
  - Summer (DST): UTC+02:00 (CEST)
- Postal code: 4573
- SFOS number: 2526
- ISO 3166 code: CH-SO
- Surrounded by: Bätterkinden (BE), Biberist, Lüsslingen, Lüterkofen-Ichertswil
- Twin towns: Lohn, Schaffhausen (Switzerland)
- Website: www.lohn-ammannsegg.ch

Lohn-Ammannsegg is a municipality in the district of Wasseramt in the canton of Solothurn in Switzerland. The municipality was formed in 1993 when Lohn and Ammannsegg united.

== History ==
Lohn is first mentioned in 1260 as Lon. Ammannsegg is first mentioned in 1261 as Amalzeich.

The Einwohnergemeinden of Lohn and Ammannsegg merged in 1993 to form the new political municipality Lohn-Ammannsegg. However, the Bürgergemeinden of the two former municipalities have remained separate.

== Geography ==
Lohn-Ammannsegg has an area, as of 2009, of 4.45 square kilometers (1.72 sq mi). Of this area, 2.12 km^{2} (0.82 sq mi) or 47.6% is used for agricultural purposes, while 1.32 km^{2} (0.51 sq mi) or 29.7% is forested. Of the rest of the land, 1.02 km^{2} (0.39 sq mi) or 22.9% is settled (buildings or roads), 0.01 km^{2} (2.5 acres) or 0.2% is either rivers or lakes.

Of the built up area, industrial buildings made up 1.6% of the total area while housing and buildings made up 15.1% and transportation infrastructure made up 5.2%. Out of the forested land, all of the forested land area is covered with heavy forests. Of the agricultural land, 35.3% is used for growing crops and 11.0% is pastures, while 1.3% is used for orchards or vine crops. All the water in the municipality is flowing water.

The municipality is located in the Wasseramt district, on the northeasternmost outlet of the Bucheggberg. It consists of the haufendorf village (an irregular, unplanned and quite closely packed village, built around a central square) of Lohn and the village of Ammannsegg.

== Coat of arms ==
The blazon of the municipal coat of arms is Per fess Gules an Oak eradicated Argent and of the last a Hook of the first.

== Demographics ==
Lohn-Ammannsegg has a population (as of December 2020) of 2,870. As of 2008, 7.3% of the population are resident foreign nationals. Over the last 10 years (1999–2009 ) the population has changed at a rate of 9.1%. It has changed at a rate of 6.4% due to migration and at a rate of -0.3% due to births and deaths.

Most of the population (as of 2000) speaks German (2,223 or 95.0%), with Italian being second most common (42 or 1.8%) and French being third (19 or 0.8%). There is 1 person who speaks Romansh.

As of 2008, the gender distribution of the population was 49.8% male and 50.2% female. The population was made up of 1,178 Swiss men (45.7% of the population) and 107 (4.1%) non-Swiss men. There were 1,200 Swiss women (46.5%) and 95 (3.7%) non-Swiss women. Of the population in the municipality 474 or about 20.3% were born in Lohn-Ammannsegg and lived there in 2000. There were 824 or 35.2% who were born in the same canton, while 762 or 32.6% were born somewhere else in Switzerland, and 214 or 9.1% were born outside of Switzerland.

In 2008 there were 9 live births to Swiss citizens and were 14 deaths of Swiss citizens and 1 non-Swiss citizen death. Ignoring immigration and emigration, the population of Swiss citizens decreased by 5 while the foreign population decreased by 1. There were 4 Swiss men and 3 Swiss women who immigrated back to Switzerland. At the same time, there were 10 non-Swiss men and 3 non-Swiss women who immigrated from another country to Switzerland. The total Swiss population change in 2008 (from all sources, including moves across municipal borders) was an increase of 61 and the non-Swiss population decreased by 4 people. This represents a population growth rate of 2.2%.

The age distribution, as of 2000, in Lohn-Ammannsegg is; 179 children or 7.7% of the population are between 0 and 6 years old and 375 teenagers or 16.0% are between 7 and 19. Of the adult population, 104 people or 4.4% of the population are between 20 and 24 years old. 646 people or 27.6% are between 25 and 44, and 666 people or 28.5% are between 45 and 64. The senior population distribution is 272 people or 11.6% of the population are between 65 and 79 years old and there are 97 people or 4.1% who are over 80.

As of 2000, there were 896 people who were single and never married in the municipality. There were 1,217 married individuals, 137 widows or widowers and 89 individuals who are divorced.

As of 2000, there were 902 private households in the municipality, and an average of 2.5 persons per household. There were 190 households that consist of only one person and 61 households with five or more people. Out of a total of 912 households that answered this question, 20.8% were households made up of just one person and there were 8 adults who lived with their parents. Of the rest of the households, there are 324 married couples without children, 333 married couples with children There were 35 single parents with a child or children. There were 12 households that were made up of unrelated people and 10 households that were made up of some sort of institution or another collective housing.

In 2000 there were 519 single family homes (or 76.8% of the total) out of a total of 676 inhabited buildings. There were 91 multi-family buildings (13.5%), along with 38 multi-purpose buildings that were mostly used for housing (5.6%) and 28 other use buildings (commercial or industrial) that also had some housing (4.1%). Of the single family homes 11 were built before 1919, while 93 were built between 1990 and 2000. The greatest number of single family homes (120) were built between 1981 and 1990.

In 2000 there were 922 apartments in the municipality. The most common apartment size was 5 rooms of which there were 292. There were 21 single room apartments and 499 apartments with five or more rooms. Of these apartments, a total of 870 apartments (94.4% of the total) were permanently occupied, while 38 apartments (4.1%) were seasonally occupied and 14 apartments (1.5%) were empty. As of 2009, the construction rate of new housing units was 2 new units per 1000 residents. The vacancy rate for the municipality, in 2010, was 1.03%.

The historical population is given in the following chart:

== Politics ==
In the 2007 federal election the most popular party was the FDP which received 32.59% of the vote. The next three most popular parties were the SVP (21.82%), the SP (20.99%) and the CVP (12.82%). In the federal election, a total of 1,089 votes were cast, and the voter turnout was 57.0%.

== Economy ==
As of 2010, Lohn-Ammannsegg had an unemployment rate of 2.5%. As of 2008, there were 20 people employed in the primary economic sector and about 7 businesses involved in this sector. 295 people were employed in the secondary sector and there were 32 businesses in this sector. 450 people were employed in the tertiary sector, with 75 businesses in this sector. There were 1,220 residents of the municipality who were employed in some capacity, of which females made up 43.0% of the workforce.

In 2008 the total number of full-time equivalent jobs was 639. The number of jobs in the primary sector was 15, all of which were in agriculture. The number of jobs in the secondary sector was 273 of which 139 or (50.9%) were in manufacturing and 131 (48.0%) were in construction. The number of jobs in the tertiary sector was 351. In the tertiary sector; 115 or 32.8% were in wholesale or retail sales or the repair of motor vehicles, 11 or 3.1% were in the movement and storage of goods, 20 or 5.7% were in a hotel or restaurant, 41 or 11.7% were in the information industry, 2 or 0.6% were the insurance or financial industry, 17 or 4.8% were technical professionals or scientists, 18 or 5.1% were in education and 87 or 24.8% were in health care.

In 2000, there were 491 workers who commuted into the municipality and 952 workers who commuted away. The municipality is a net exporter of workers, with about 1.9 workers leaving the municipality for every one entering. Of the working population, 17.1% used public transportation to get to work, and 62.3% used a private car.

== Religion ==
From the 2000 census, 763 or 32.6% were Roman Catholic, while 1,105 or 47.2% belonged to the Swiss Reformed Church. Of the rest of the population, there were 19 members of an Orthodox church (or about 0.81% of the population), there were 5 individuals (or about 0.21% of the population) who belonged to the Christian Catholic Church, and there were 26 individuals (or about 1.11% of the population) who belonged to another Christian church. There were 13 (or about 0.56% of the population) who were Islamic. There was 1 person who was Buddhist, 2 individuals who were Hindu and 3 individuals who belonged to another church. 350 (or about 14.96% of the population) belonged to no church, are agnostic or atheist, and 52 individuals (or about 2.22% of the population) did not answer the question.

== Education ==
In Lohn-Ammannsegg about 969 or (41.4%) of the population have completed non-mandatory upper secondary education, and 429 or (18.3%) have completed additional higher education (either university or a Fachhochschule). Of the 429 who completed tertiary schooling, 74.6% were Swiss men, 20.0% were Swiss women, 3.5% were non-Swiss men and 1.9% were non-Swiss women.

During the 2010–2011 school year there were a total of 212 students in the Lohn-Ammannsegg school system. The education system in the Canton of Solothurn allows young children to attend two years of non-obligatory Kindergarten. During that school year, there were 35 children in kindergarten. The canton's school system requires students to attend six years of primary school, with some of the children attending smaller, specialized classes. In the municipality there were 169 students in primary school and 8 students in the special, smaller classes. The secondary school program consists of three lower, obligatory years of schooling, followed by three to five years of optional, advanced schools. All the lower secondary students from Lohn-Ammannsegg attend their school in a neighboring municipality.

As of 2000, there were 14 students in Lohn-Ammannsegg who came from another municipality, while 186 residents attended schools outside the municipality.
