= Roger Hegi =

Swiss footballer and manager (born 1956)

Personal information
- Date of birth: 28 February 1956 (age 70)
- Position: Midfielder

Senior career*
Years	Team	Apps	(Gls)
1974–1984	FC Aarau		
1977	→ FC Young Fellows Zürich		
1984–1986	FC Luzern		
1986–1990	FC St. Gallen		

Managerial career
- 1996–1998: FC St. Gallen
- 1999: Grasshopper Club Zürich
- 2012–2014: BSC Old Boys
- * Club domestic league appearances and goals

Roger Hegi (born 28 February 1956) is a retired Swiss football midfielder and later manager.
