= Rudolf Elsener =

Swiss footballer (born 1953)

Ruedi Elsener
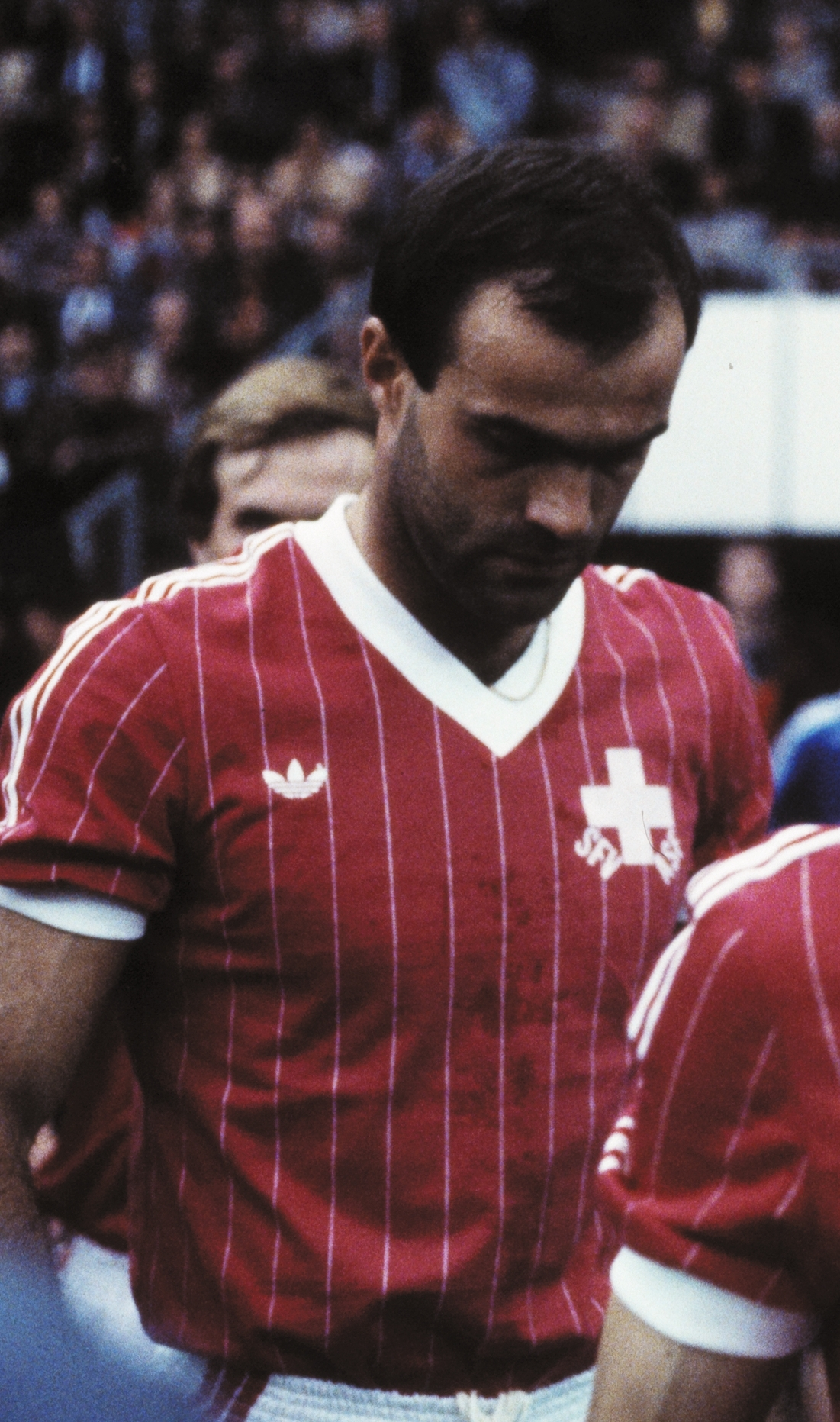
- Elsener with Switzerland

Personal information
- Full name: Rudolf Elsener
- Date of birth: 18 February 1953 (age 73)
- Place of birth: Zürich, Switzerland
- Height: 1.84 m (6 ft 0 in)
- Position: Forward

Youth career
- –1970: FC Industrie Zürich

Senior career*
Years	Team	Apps	(Gls)
1971–1978	Grasshoppers	129	(40)
1978–1979	Eintracht Frankfurt	33	(9)
1979–1984	FC Zürich	139	(31)
1984–1986	Neuchâtel Xamax	58	(14)
1986–1987	Vevey Sports	18	(5)
1987–1988	Yverdon Sports		
Total		377	(99)

International career
1974–1983	Switzerland	49	(6)
- * Club domestic league appearances and goals

Rudolf "Ruedi" Elsener (born 18 February 1953) is a Swiss former professional footballer who played as a forward.

== National Team ==
Elsener played a total of 48 international matches for Switzerland between 1974 and 1983. During this time, he was called up to the squad by five different national coaches. Elsener's highlight with the team came in 1982, when he scored the most important of his six goals in a 1-0 win against reigning world champions Italy.

== Honours ==
Grasshoppers

- Nationalliga A: 1977–78
- Swiss League Cup: 1973, 1974–75

FC Zürich

- Nationalliga A: 1980–81
- Swiss League Cup: 1980–81

Individual

- Swiss Footballer of the Year: 1978
