= 1979–80 FC Zürich season =

FC Zürich
1979–80 season
- Owner: Edwin Nägeli (until December 1979) thereafter: Alfred Zweidler
- Chairman: Edwin Nägeli (until December 1979) thereafter: Alfred Zweidler
- Head coach: Zlatko Čajkovski (until March 1980 thereafter co-coaches: Albert Sing and Rosario Martinelli
- Stadium: Letzigrund
- Nationalliga A: 4th
- 1979–80 Swiss Cup: Round 5
- 1979–80 Swiss League Cup: Semi-finals
- 1979–80 UEFA Cup: Round 1
- 1979 Intertoto Cup: 3rd in group
- Top goalscorer: League: Walter Seiler (24); All: Walter Seiler (30)

The 1979–80 season was FC Zürich's 83rd season in their existence, since their foundation in 1896. It was their 21st consecutive season in the top flight of Swiss football, following their promotion at the end of the 1957–58 season. They played their home games in the Letzigrund.

== Overview ==
The FCZ owner and president at this time was Edwin Nägeli, who had held this position since 1957. Nägeli passed away on 6 December 1979 after he suffered a heart attack in the stands before kickoff of the game against the Young Boys four days earlier. The club's president from then onwards was Alfred Zweidler. The Yugoslav and Croatian Zlatko Čajkovski who had been appointed as head-coach last season continued for his second season. However toward the end of March he was fired. Albert Sing and Rosario Martinelli were appointed as joint coaches until the end of the season. FCZ competed not only in the domestic first-tier 1979–80 Nationalliga A, but also competed in 1979–80 Swiss Cup and in the 1979–80 Swiss League Cup. Having ended the last season as league runner-up the FCZ first team had qualified to compete in the 1979–80 UEFA Cup. They also entered into the 1979 Intertoto Cup.

== Players ==
The following is the list of the FCZ first team squad this season. It also includes players that were in the squad the day the domestic league season started, on 11 August 1979, but subsequently left the club after that date.

Note: Flags indicate national team as defined under FIFA eligibility rules; some limited exceptions apply. Players may hold more than one non-FIFA nationality.

No.	Pos.	Nation	Player
1	GK	SUI	Karl Grob (league games: 30)
—	GK	SUI	Urs Zurbuchen (league games: 8)
—	DF	SUI	Fritz Baur (league games: 28)
—	DF	SUI	Pierre-Albert Chapuisat (league games: 9)
—	DF	SUI	Alberto Erba (league games: 14)
—	DF	SUI	Rudolf Landolt (league games: 34)
—	DF	SUI	Heinz Lüdi (league games: 31)
—	DF	SUI	Gianpietro Zappa (league games: 34)
—	DF	SUI	Horst Thoma (league games: 0)
—	MF	SUI	Georg Aliesch (league games: 0)

No.	Pos.	Nation	Player
—	MF	SUI	René Botteron (league games: 35)
—	MF	YUG	Jurica Jerković (league games: 36)
—	MF	SUI	Roger Kundert (league games: 22)
—	MF	SUI	Manfred Moser (league games: 16)
—	MF	SUI	Fredi Scheiwiler (league games: 0)
—	FW	SUI	Ruedi Elsener (league games: 31)
—	FW	SUI	Winfried Kurz (league games: 17)
—	FW	SUI	Franz Peterhans (league games: 32)
—	FW	SUI	Peter Risi (league games: 0)
—	FW	SUI	Walter Seiler (league games: 36)
—	FW	SUI	Hans-Peter Zwicker (league games: 23)

Players who left the squad

Note: Flags indicate national team as defined under FIFA eligibility rules; some limited exceptions apply. Players may hold more than one non-FIFA nationality.

No.	Pos.	Nation	Player
—	DF	SUI	Pius Fischbach (to FC Villmergen)
—	DF	SUI	Max Heer (retired)

No.	Pos.	Nation	Player
—	MF	SUI	Albert Hohl (FCZ reserves)
—	FW	SUI	Rolf Meier (to Winterthur)

== Results ==
Legend

Win Draw Loss Postponed

=== Nationalliga A ===
==== Qualifying matches ====
11 August 1979 Round 1	Young Boys	1–2	Zürich	Wankdorf Stadium, Bern
	Zwygart 39' (1:0); Zwygart (penalty missed) 90′	FCZ summary YB summary	50' (1:1) Zappa; 66' (1:2) Zwicker; (yellow card) 77' Jerković; (yellow card) 81' Kundert	Attendance: 6,500; Referee: (Switzerland) Franz Gächter (Aarau, Suhr, Aargau)

18 August 1979 Round 2	Zürich	3–2	Lausanne-Sport	Letzigrund, Zürich
	Seiler 17' (1:0); Zwicker 29' (2:0); Zwicker 43' (3:1)	FCZ summary	43' (2:1) Kok; 53' (3:2) Lometti	Attendance: 5,500; Referee: (Switzerland) Ernst Dörflinger (Grenchen and Basel)
Note: Corners 12:3

25 August 1979 Round 3	Chênois	2–4	Zürich	Stade des Trois-Chêne, Thônex
	Garande 23' (1:1); Riner 31' (2:2)	FCZ summary	16' (0:1) Seiler; 28' (1:2) Jerković; 67' (2:3) Lüdi; 73' (2:4) Peterhans	Attendance: 3,500; Referee: (Switzerland) Bruno Galler (Kirchdorf, Bern)

29 August 1979 Round 4	Zürich	7–2	Chiasso	Letzigrund, Zürich
	Lüdi 28' (1:0); Botteron 50' (2:1); Seiler 55' (3:1); Seiler 56' (4:1); Seiler 78' (5:1); Moser 85' (6:2); Seiler 90' (7:2)	FCZ summary	43' (1:1) Mohorović; 83' (5:2) Pellegrini	Attendance: 4,500; Referee: (Switzerland) Denis Perrenoud (Neuchâtel)

1 September 1979 Round 5	Zürich	4–2	Xamax	Letzigrund, Zürich
	Baur (yellow card) 27'; Ruedi Elsener 55' (1:1); Botteron 63' (2:2); Seiler 74' (3:2); Kundert 90' (4:2)	FCZ summary	36' (0:1) Favre; (yellow card) 44' Bianchi; 61' (1:2) Küffer; (yellow card) 63' Küffer	Attendance: 6,000; Referee: (Switzerland) Peter Scherz (Aegerten)

8 September 1979 Round 6	St. Gallen	4–0	Zürich	Espenmoos, St. Gallen
	Weber 71' (1:0); Mullis 82' (2:0); Stöckl 85' (3:0); Stöckl 90' (4:0)	FCZ summary		Attendance: 9,400; Referee: (Switzerland) Jakob Baumann (Schaffhausen)

15 September 1979 Round 7	Servette	0–4	Zürich	Charmilles Stadium, Geneva
		FCZ summary	(yellow card) 7' Kundert; 43' (o.g.) Guyot; 45' (0:2) Peterhans; 47' (0:3) Botteron; (yellow card) 47' Chapuisat; 88' (0:4) Seiler	Attendance: 14,500; Referee: (Switzerland) Rudolf Renggli (Luzern)
Note: Corners: 20:4

23 September 1979 Round 8	Zürich	5–1	Lugano	Letzigrund, Zürich
	Seiler 5' (1:0); Zwicker 6' (2:0); Baur (yellow card) 30'; Kundert (yellow card) 43'; Botteron 60' (3:1); Jerković 63' (4:1); Zwicker 80' (5:1)	FCZ summary	42' (2:1) Elia; (yellow card) 65' Casanova	Attendance: 4,500; Referee: (Switzerland) Franz Gächter (Aarau, Suhr, Aargau)

3 October 1979 Round 9	Luzern	2–1	Zürich	Stadion Allmend, Luzern
	Christen 21' (1:0); Risi 39' (2:0); Fischer (yellow card) 45'	FCZ summary	(yellow card) 16' Jerković; (yellow card) 47' Elsener; 49' (2:1) Elsener; (yellow card) 70' Baur; (yellow card) 83' Zwicker	Attendance: 14,800; Referee: (Switzerland) Othmar Winter, (Martigny)

21 October 1979 Round 10	Zürich	4–2	Sion	Letzigrund, Zürich
	Seiler 54' (1:1); Seiler 61' (2:1); Seiler 75' (3:1); Seiler 77' (4:1)	FCZ summary	15' (0:1) Brigger; 89' (4:2) Vergères; (yellow card) Mathez	Attendance: 7,000; Referee: (Switzerland) Marco Raveglia (San Vittore)

28 October 1979 Round 11	La Chaux-de-Fonds	0–0	Zürich	Stade Charrière, La Chaux-de-Fonds
	Mérillat (yellow card) 87'	FCZ summary	(yellow card) 57' Kundert; (yellow card) 74' Landolt	Attendance: 5,200; Referee: (Switzerland) Charles-Henri Morex (Bex)

11 November 1979 Round 12	Zürich	1–1	Basel	Letzigrund, Zürich
14:30	Kundert (yellow card) 21'; Seiler 71' (1:1)	FCZ summary FCB summary	29' (0:1) Lauscher; (yellow card) 61' Demarmels	Attendance: 14,500; Referee: (Switzerland) André Daina (Éclépens)

24 November 1979 Round 13	Grasshopper Club	0–0	Zürich	Hardturm, Zürich
	Nafzger (yellow card) 47'; Meier (yellow card) 83'	FCZ summary	(yellow card) 8' Kurz	Attendance: 21,500; Referee: (Switzerland) Jakob Baumann (Schaffhausen)

2 December 1979 Round 14	Zürich	4–1	Young Boys	Letzigrund, Zürich
	Jerković 24' (1:0); Elsener 26' (2:0); Elsener 36' (3:0); Zappa (yellow card) 48'; Jerković 67' (4:1); Landolt (yellow card) 80'	FCZ summary	38' (3:1) Conz	Attendance: 6,500; Referee: (Switzerland) Thomas Meier
Note: FCZ president Edi Naegeli suffered a heart attack in the stands before kickoff. He died four days later in the university hospital.

2 March 1980 Round 15	Lausanne-Sport	3–0	Zürich	Olympique de la Pontaise, Lausanne
	Guillaume 63' (1:0); Kok 68' (2:0); Parietti 83' (pen.)	FCZ summary	(yellow card) 38' Chapuisat; (yellow card) 45' Baur; (yellow card) 82' (yellow-red card) 83' Grob	Attendance: 4,800; Referee: (Switzerland) Renzo Peduzzi (Roveredo)

9 March 1980 Round 16	Zürich	0–0	Chênois	Letzigrund, Zürich
	Jerković (penalty missed)	FCZ summary		Attendance: 3,500; Referee: (Switzerland) Gottlieb Barmettler (Luzern)
Note: A minute of silence for Edi Naegeli.

16 March 1980 Round 17	Xamax	2–3	Zürich	Stade de la Maladière, Neuchâtel
	Favre 41' (pen.); Favre 75' (pen.)	FCZ summary	10' (0:1) Botteron; (yellow card) 69' Zappa; 71' (1:2) Zwicker; 82' (2:3) Peterhans	Attendance: 4,000; Referee: (Switzerland) Werner Bösch (Sutz-Lattrigen)

22 March 1980 Round 18	Zürich	0–3	St. Gallen	Letzigrund, Zürich
	Baur (yellow card) 46'; Kurz (red card) 58'; Zwicker (yellow card)	FCZ summary	4' (pen.) Stöckl; 11' (0:2) Brander; (yellow card) 32' Gisinger; 80' (0:3) Hafner	Attendance: 5,500; Referee: (Switzerland) Peter Rotschi (Oensingen)
Note: After the final whistle, approximately 100 fans stormed the pitch. Linesman Horst Lüthi was knocked to the ground. Hermann Burgermeister protected referee Peter Rotschi and was also struck. On their way home, the Solothurner referees were harassed by a car driven by an FCZ fan from Aargau. Rotschi subsequently resigned immediately as a referee. The Swiss Football Association (ASF/SFV) ordered an investigation into the circumstances.

29 March 1980 Round 19	Zürich	1–3	Servette	Letzigrund, Zürich
	Botteron 68' (pen.); Lüdi (yellow card) 76'	FCZ summary	22' (0:1) Barberis; 45' (0:2) Bizzini; 88' (1:3) Barberis	Attendance: 8,500; Referee: (Switzerland) André Daina (Éclépens)
Note: First game with Albert Sing and Rosario Martinelli as co-coaches. The dismissed Zlatko Čajkovski in the stands as a spectator.

12 April 1980 Round 20	Lugano	0–2	Zürich	Cornaredo, Lugano
		FCZ summary	20' (0:1) Peterhans; 77' (o.g.) (Bunkhofer)	Attendance: 1,500; Referee: (Switzerland) Peter Scherz (Aegerten)
Note: Corners: 4:14.

19 April 1980 Round 21	Zürich	3–1	Luzern	Letzigrund, Zürich
	Botteron 77' (pen.); Peterhans 80' (2:1); Elsener 90' (3:1)	FCZ summary	37' (0:1) Christen; (yellow card) Binder	Attendance: 13,000; Referee: (Switzerland) Franz Gächter (Aarau, Suhr, Aargau)

26 April 1980 Round 22	Sion	3–2	Zürich	Stade Tourbillon, Sion
	Cernicky 11' (1:0); Mathez 29' (2:0); Perrier 80' (3:2)	FCZ summary	33' (2:1) Seiler; (yellow card) 58' Erba; 73' (2:2) Jerković	Attendance: 5,300; Referee: (Switzerland) Jean-Marie Macheret (Rueyres-St-Laurent)

3 May 1980 Round 23	Zürich	3–1	La Chaux-de-Fonds	Schützenwiese, Winterthur
	Elsener 8' (1:0); Seiler 22' (2:0); Peterhans 80' (3:0); Baur (yellow card) 90'	FCZ summary	(yellow card) 41' Katić; 84' (3:1) Mauron; (yellow card) 90' Capraro	Attendance: 2,000; Referee: (Switzerland) Othmar Winter, (Martigny)
Note: Following the investigation that the Swiss Football Association (ASF/SFV) had ordered due to the massive disturbances during the championship match against St. Gallen on 22 March 1980 (pitch invasion by approximately 100 FCZ fans, punch against a linesman), the ASF/SFV closed the Letzigrund stadium for one game. The match had to be played in Winterthur due to this closure.

10 May 1980 Round 24	Basel	3–1	Zürich	St. Jakob Stadium, Basel
20:00	Lauscher 23' (1:0); Marti 56' (2:0); Lauscher 58' (3:0); Maissen (yellow card) 89'	FCZ summary Summary	(yellow card) 58' Lüdi; 61' (3:1) Elsener	Attendance: 19,000; Referee: (Switzerland) André Daina (Éclépens)

17 May 1980 Round 25	Chiasso	1–0	Zürich	Stadio Comunale Riva IV, Chiasso
	Bang 17' (1:0); Preisig (yellow card)	FCZ summary	(yellow card) Erba	Attendance: 2,000; Referee: (Switzerland) Werner Bösch (Sutz-Lattrigen)

20 May 1980 Round 26	Zürich	2–2	Grasshopper Club	Letzigrund, Zürich
	Seiler 35' (1:1); Grob (yellow card) 40'; Landolt (yellow card) 69'; Zwicker 80' (2:2)	FCZ summary	24' (0:1) Hermann; 36' (1:2) Sulser; (yellow card) 54' Nafzger	Attendance: 10,000; Referee: (Switzerland) Alfred Heinis (Ammannsegg, Biberist)

==== Qualifying phase table ====
Pos	Team	Pld	W	D	L	GF	GA	GD	Pts	Qualification
1	Servette	26	16	7	3	61	25	+36	39	Advance to championship round halved points (rounded up) as bonus
2	Basel	26	15	7	4	67	27	+40	37	Advance to championship round halved points (rounded up) as bonus
3	Grasshopper Club	26	14	8	4	61	21	+40	36	Advance to championship round halved points (rounded up) as bonus
4	Luzern	26	14	4	8	44	44	0	32	Advance to championship round halved points (rounded up) as bonus
5	Zürich	26	13	5	8	56	42	+14	31	Advance to championship round halved points (rounded up) as bonus
6	Sion	26	11	9	6	47	37	+10	31	Advance to championship round halved points (rounded up) as bonus
7	St. Gallen	26	11	6	9	48	37	+11	28	entered 1980 Intertoto Cup
8	Chiasso	26	6	11	9	27	43	−16	23	
9	Lausanne-Sport	26	8	6	12	35	38	−3	22	
10	Young Boys	26	8	5	13	34	49	−15	21	entered 1980 Intertoto Cup
11	Chênois	26	4	12	10	32	45	−13	20	
12	Xamax	26	8	4	14	33	48	−15	20	entered 1980 Intertoto Cup
13	La Chaux-de-Fonds	26	5	7	14	24	57	−33	17	Relegated to 1980–81 Nationalliga B
14	Lugano	26	1	5	20	18	74	−56	7	Relegated to 1980–81 Nationalliga B

Source: rsssf.com
Rules for classification: 1) Points; 2) Goal difference; 3) Goals scored;

==== Championship group matches ====
31 May 1980 Round 1	Zürich	1–1	Luzern	Letzigrund, Zürich
	Zwicker 16' (1:0); Botteron (yellow card) 63'	FCZ summary	61' (1:1) Schär	Attendance: 9,500; Referee: (Switzerland) Marino Paggiola (Appenzell)

4 June 1980 Round 2	Grasshopper Club	0–1	Zürich	Hardturm, Zürich
		FCZ summary	37' (0:1) Seiler; (yellow card) 53' Elsener; (yellow card) 56' Seiler	Attendance: 13,500; Referee: (Switzerland) Jean-Marie Macheret (Rueyres-St-Laurent)

7 June 1980 Round 3	Servette	3–0	Zürich	Charmilles Stadium, Geneva
	Hamberg 28' (1:0); Barberis 31' (2:0); Hamberg 60' (3:0)	FCZ summary		Attendance: 8,000; Referee: (Switzerland) Franz Gächter (Aarau, Suhr, Aargau)

10 June 1980 Round 4	Zürich	2–1	Sion	Letzigrund, Zürich
	(Richard) 71' (o.g.); Botteron 79' (2:1)	FCZ summary	(yellow card) 75' Richard; 77' (pen.) Richard; (yellow card) 79' Perrier	Attendance: 4,500; Referee: (Switzerland) Marco Raveglia (San Vittore)

13 June 1980 Round 5	Basel	2–0	Zürich	St. Jakob Stadium, Basel
20:00	Küttel 55' (1:0); Küttel 74' (2:0)	FCZ summary FCB summary		Attendance: 10,000; Referee: (Switzerland) Gottlieb Barmettler (Luzern)

16 June 1980 Round 6	Luzern	0–2	Zürich	Stadion Allmend, Luzern
		FCZ summary	36' (0:1) Seiler; 72' (0:2) Seiler	Attendance: 7,000; Referee: (Switzerland) Rolf Blattmann (Zeiningen)

20 June 1980 Round 7	Zürich	5–1	Grasshopper Club	Letzigrund, Zürich
	Jerković 11' (1:0); Seiler 25' (2:0); Baur (yellow card) 27'; Elsener 28' (3:0); Jerković 43' (4:0); Lüdi (yellow card) 45'; Botteron 83' (5:0)	FCZ summary	90' (pen.) Sulser	Attendance: 11,000

23 June 1980 Round 8	Zürich	2–0	Servette	Letzigrund, Zürich
	Seiler 19' (1:0); Botteron 49' (2:0)	FCZ summary		Attendance: 8,700; Referee: (Switzerland) Peter Aschwanden, (Luzern)

27 June 1980 Round 9	Sion	3–2	Zürich	Stade Tourbillon, Sion
	Cernicky 53' (1:1); Richard 66' (pen. 2:1); Vergères 84' (3:2)	FCZ summary	23' (0:1) Seiler; (yellow card) 42' Landolt; (yellow card) 67' Zwicker; 72' (2:2) Seiler	Attendance: 5,700; Referee: (Switzerland) Denis Perrenoud (Neuchâtel)

30 June 1980 Round 10	Zürich	2–4	Basel	Letzigrund, Zürich
20:00	Jerković 9' (1:1); Landolt (yellow card) 41'; Zappa 77' (2:4)	FCZ summary FCB summary	4' (0:1) Maissen; 21' (1:2) Lauscher; 31' (1:3) Marti; 35' (o.g. 1:4) (Erba); (yellow card) 72' Maissen	Attendance: 24,000; Referee: (Switzerland) Bruno Galler (Kirchdorf, Bern)
Note: With this victory Basel became Swiss champions 1979/80. After the game, the trophy was presented by Nationalliga president Rumo.

==== Championship table ====
Pos	Team	Pld	W	D	L	GF	GA	GD	BP	Pts	Qualification
1	Basel	10	6	2	2	24	11	+13	19	33	Champions, qualified for 1980–81 European Cup
2	Grasshopper Club	10	5	3	2	21	11	+10	18	31	qualified for 1980–81 UEFA Cup
3	Servette	10	5	1	4	18	11	+7	20	31	qualified for 1980–81 UEFA Cup
4	Zürich	10	5	1	4	17	15	+2	16	27	
5	Sion	10	4	2	4	22	20	+2	16	26	Swiss Cup winners, qualified for 1980–81 Cup Winners' Cup and entered 1980 Intertoto Cup
6	Luzern	10	0	1	9	4	38	−34	16	17	

Source: rsssf.com
Rules for classification: 1) Points; 2) Goal difference; 3) Goals scored;

=== Swiss Cup ===
29 September 1979 Round 4	FC Egerkingen	1–9	Zürich	Sportplatz Byfang, Egerkingen
	Schwarz 34' (1:2)	FCZ summary	20' (0:1) Botteron; 22' (0:2) Erba; 43' (1:3) Peterhans; 48' (1:4) Peterhans; 50' (1:5) Botteron; 58' (1:6) Zappa; 75' (1:7) Seiler; 84' (1:8) Zwicker; 88' (1:9) Peterhans	Attendance: 5,000; Referee: (Switzerland) Arturo Martino (Neukirch an der Thur)

3 November 1979 Round 5	Chênois	4–1	Zürich	Stade des Trois-Chêne, Chêne-Bourg
	Tachet 23' (1:1); Garande 49' (2:1); Garande 74' (3:1); Garande 79' (4:1)	FCZ summary	7' (0:1) Peterhans; (penalty missed) 40′ Botteron	Attendance: 3,000; Referee: (Switzerland) Jean-Marie Macheret (Rueyres-St-Laurent)

=== Swiss League Cup ===
8 August 1979 Round 1	Mendrisiostar	1–7	Zürich	Centro Sportivo Comunale, Mendrisio
	Solcà 48' (1:1); Croci (yellow card) 55'	FCZ summary	35' (0:1) Seiler; 55' (1:2) Zappa; 68' (1:3) Kundert; 70' (1:4) Seiler; 75' (1:5) Seiler; 79' (o.g.) Croci; (penalty missed) 85' (1:7) Elsener	Attendance: 1,200; Referee: (Switzerland) Bruno Burgener (Kriens)
Note: 85' Elsener converts the penalty on the rebound.

17 February 1980 Round 2	Zürich	2–1	Nordstern Basel	Letzigrund, Zürich
	Peterhans 20' (1:0); Jerković 37' (2:0)	FCZ summary	63' (2:1) Zbinden	Attendance: 700; Referee: (Switzerland) Bruno Burgener (Kriens)
Note: A minute of silence for Edi Naegeli

24 February 1980 Quarter-final	Aarau	0–1	Zürich	Stadion Brügglifeld, Aarau
		FCA summary FCZ summary	(yellow card) 50' Elsener; 81' (0:1) Peterhans	Attendance: 3,200; Referee: (Switzerland) Ulrich Nyffenegger (Nidau)

8 April 1980 Semi-final	Grasshopper Club	2–1	Zürich	Hardturm, Zürich
	Bauer 37' (pen. 1:1); Egli 52' (2:1)	FCZ summary	37' (0:1) Zwicker	Attendance: 5,500; Referee: (Switzerland) Jakob Baumann (Schaffhausen)

=== UEFA Cup ===
19 September 1979 Round 1 first leg	Zürich (Switzerland)	1–3	(West Germany) Kaiserslautern	Letzigrund, Zürich
	Zwicker 83'	Report	Neues 20' (pen.); Bongartz 82'; Wolf 85'	Attendance: 18,000; Referee: Alexis Ponnet (Belgium)

3 October 1979 Round 1 second leg	Kaiserslautern (West Germany)	5–1 (8–2 agg.)	(Switzerland) Zürich	Fritz-Walter-Stadion, Kaiserslautern
	Melzer 15', 46'; Kaminke 29'; Wendt 54'; Geye 85'	Report	Zappa 16'	Attendance: 14,160; Referee: Bob Valentine (Scotland)

Kaiserslautern won 8–2 on aggregate.

=== Intertoto Cup ===
==== Group 4 matches ====
30 June 1979 Matchday 1	Bohemians Prague (Czechoslovakia)	2–2	Zürich	Prague
	Tichý 19' (1:1); Nemec 53' (2:1)	FCZ summary	12' (0:1) Risi; 87' (2:2) Botteron	Attendance: 3,000; Referee: (Czechoslovakia) Jaromír Fausek

7 July 1979 Matchday 2	Zürich	1–0	IFK Göteborg	Eschenbach, St. Gallen
	Seiler 73' (1:0)	FCZ summary	(yellow card) 63' Karlsson	Attendance: 1,300; Referee: (Switzerland) Peter Scherz (Aegerten)

14 July 1979 Matchday 3	Zürich	4–3	(Denmark) Odense	Dulliken
	Seiler 5' (1:0); Jerković 14' (2:0); Jerković 26' (3:1); Jerković 77' (4:3)	FCZ summary	23' (pen. 2:1) Eriksen; 41' (3:2) Eriksen; 44' (3:3) Munk Nielsen	Attendance: 2,000; Referee: (Switzerland) Franz Gächter (Suhr, Aargau)

21 July 1979 Matchday 4	Zürich	1–2	(Czechoslovakia) Bohemians Prague	Allmend, Horgen
	Zwicker 68' (1:1)	FCZ summary	49' (0:1) Tichý; (yellow card) 72' Roubícek; (yellow card) 81' Panenka; 82' (1:2) Nemec	Attendance: 3,000; Referee: (Switzerland) Meier

28 July 1979 Matchday 5	Odense (Denmark)	3–0	Zürich	Fionia Park, Odense
	Eriksen 10' (1:0); Eriksen 28' (2:0); Andersen (yellow card) 54'; Eriksen 67' (3:0)	FCZ summary	(yellow card) 67' Lüdi; (yellow card) 67' Baur	Attendance: 1,500; Referee: (Denmark) Sörensen

4 August 1979 Matchday 6	IFK Göteborg	5–1	Zürich	Göteborg
	Holm 10' (pen. 1:0); Holmgren 34' (2:0); Nilsson 38' (3:0); Nilsson 45' (4:0); Holmgren 54' (5:0); Olausson (yellow card)	FCZ summary	75' (5:1) Zwicker; (yellow card) Baur; (yellow card) Chapuisat; (yellow card) Zwicker; (yellow card) Seiler; (yellow card) Zappa	Attendance: 3,289; Referee: (Sweden) Per-Arne Morin

==== Final group table ====
Pos	Team	Pld	W	D	L	GF	GA	GD	Pts	B05	GÖT	ZÜR	OB
1	(Czechoslovakia) Bohemians Prague	6	4	1	1	13	10	+3	9	—	3–2	2–2	4–1
2	(Sweden) IFK Göteborg	6	3	1	2	19	8	+11	7	4–0	—	5–1	6–1
3	(Switzerland) Zürich	6	2	1	3	9	15	−6	5	1–2	1–0	—	4–3
4	(Denmark) Odense	6	1	1	4	10	18	−8	3	0–2	2–2	3–0	—

Source: mogiel.net
Rules for classification: 1) Points; 2) Goal difference; 3) Goals scored; 4) Head-to-head points; 5) Away goals scored; 6) Draw.

=== Friendly matches ===
==== Pre-season ====
31 July 1989 Exhibition game	Servette	3–2	Zürich	Wankdorf Stadium, Bern
	(Baur) 2' (o.g.); Andrey 47' (2:2); Schnyder 65' (3:2)	FCZ summary	1' (0:1) Botteron; 30' (1:2) Kundert	Attendance: 6,000; Referee: (Switzerland) Denis Perrenoud (Neuchâtel)
Note: Philip-Cups, semi-final

7 August 1979 Exhibition game	Young Boys	1–3	Zürich	Wankdorf Stadium, Bern
	Schönenberger 60' (1:3)	FCZ summary	29' (0:1) Seiler; 37' (0:2) Seiler; 44' (0:3) Jerković	Attendance: 4,500; Referee: (Switzerland) Werner Liebi, (Thun)
Note: Philip-Cups, game for third place

==== Autumn mid-season ====
15 August 1979 Exhibition game	FC Balzers	0–4	Zürich	Sportplatz Rheinau, Balzers
		FCZ summary	21' (0:1) Seiler; 27' (0:2) Zwicker; 38' (0:3) Kundert; 86' (0:4) Jerković	Attendance: 1,800; Referee: (Switzerland) Marino Paggiola (Appenzell)

21 August 1979 Joan Gamper Trophy	Barcelona	4–0	Zürich	Camp Nou, Barcelona
	Sánchez 24' (1:0); Asensi 53' (2:0); Simonsen 55' (3:0); Simonsen 62' (4:0)	FCZ summary		Attendance: 70,000; Referee: (Spain) Condon Uriz
Note: Semi-final of the Trofeo Joan Gamper

22 August 1979 Joan Gamper Trophy	R.S.C. Anderlecht	2–2	Zürich	Camp Nou, Barcelona
	Nielsen 6' (1:0); Electeur 57' (2:1)	FCZ summary	8' (1:1) Peterhans; 25' (2:2) Seiler	Attendance: 60.000
Note: Third place match of the Trofeo Joan Gamper; Anderlecht won the penalty shootout.

5 September 1979 Friendly	AEK Athens	3–1	Zürich	Nea Filadelfeia
21:00 EEST (UTC+3)	Bajević 1' (1:0); Mavros 6' (2:0); Bajević (penalty missed) 56′ Kalaitzidis 85' (3:1)	FCZ summary AEK summary	22' (2:1) Botteron	Stadium: AEK Stadium; Attendance: 15,644; Referee: (Greece) Chiotakis (Piraeus)

==== Winter break ====
24 January 1980 Exhibition game	Málaga	2–1	Zürich	Málaga
	44' (1:1); 72' (pen.)	FCZ summary	11' (0:1) Elsener	Attendance: 3,500; Referee: (Spain)
Note: Match as part of the training camp in Malaga

2 February 1980 Exhibition game	Kriens	1–1	Zürich	Letzigrund (Trainings ground), Zürich
	Nussbaumer (1:1)	FCZ summary	(0:1) Baur	Attendance: 350

6 February 1980 Exhibition game	FC Balzers	2–3	Zürich	Sportplatz Rheinau, Balzers
19:00	Wildhaber 18' (1:0); Büchel 85' (2:3)	FCZ summary	36' (1:1) Zwicker; 47' (1:2) Seiler; 70' (1:3) Elsener	Attendance: 500; Referee: (Switzerland) Arturo Martino (Neukirch an der Thur)
Note: Balzers played the 1979/80 season in der 1. Liga (third-tier).

9 February 1980 Exhibition game	FC Lerchenfeld	1–5	Zürich	Sportanlagen Waldeck, Thun
	Renfer 64' (1:1)	FCZ summary	27' (0:1) Zwicker; 75' (1:2) Zwicker; 78' (1:3) Seiler; 80' (1:4) Zwicker; 89' (1:5) Peterhans	Attendance: 1,200; Referee: (Switzerland) Meyer
Note: Lerchenfeld played the 1979/80 season in der 1. Liga (third-tier).

12 February 1980 Exhibition game	Baden	0–8	Zürich	Esp Stadium, Fislisbach
		FCZ summary	7' (0:1) Peterhans; 26' (0:2) Elsener; 43' (0:3) Jerković; 51' (0:4) Lüdi; 60' (0:5) Elsener; 70' (0:6) Seiler; 75' (0:7) Elsener; (yellow card) 77' Elsener; 85' (0:8) Moser	Attendance: 450; Referee: (Switzerland) Franz Gächter (Aarau, Suhr, Aargau)

21 February 1980 Exhibition game	FC Adliswil	0–5	Zürich	Tüfi, Adliswil
		FCZ summary	17' (0:1) Zwicker; 28' (0:2) Jerković; 53' (0:3) Zwicker; 79' (0:4) Jerković; 87' (0:5) Zwicker	Attendance: 400; Referee: (Switzerland) Jakob Schönenberger, (Zürich)
Note: Adliswil played the 1979/80 season in der 2. Liga (fourth-tier).

==== Spring mid-season ====
3 April 1980 Exhibition game	Zürich	0–2	Bayern Munich	Letzigrund, Zürich
		FCZ summary	31' (0:1) Janzon; 70' (0:2) Dürnberger	Attendance: 7,000; Referee: (Switzerland) Isler (Affoltern am Albis and Zürich)
Note: Rain throughout the entire match, therefore it resulted in a deep, difficult-to-play pitch.

29 April 1980 Exhibition game	FC Turicum	1–4	Zürich	Hardhof, Zürich
	Vergani 59' (1:3)	FCZ summary	10' (0:1) Seiler; 16' (0:2) Seiler; 23' (0:3) Seiler; 83' (1:4) Moser	Attendance: 30

5 May 1980 Exhibition game	FC Wiedikon	2–11	Zürich	Heuried Wiedikon, Zürich
	Mastroberardino 73' (1:9); Mastroberardino 83' (2:10)	FCZ summary	3' (0:1) Elsener; 10' (0:2) Botteron; 16' (0:3) Zappa; 17' (0:4) Peterhans; 20' (0:5) Moser; 45' (0:6) Moser; 53' (0:7) Moser; 61' (0:8) Elsener; 67' (0:9) Elsener; 82' (1:10) Elsener; 85' (2:11) Peterhans	Attendance: 300; Referee: (Switzerland) Hauser, (Oberengstringen)

13 May 1980 Exhibition game	FC Blue Stars Zürich	1–6	Zürich	Letzigrund, Zürich
	Sutter 28' (1:1)	FCZ summary	11' (0:1); 34' (1:2) Elsener; 73' (1:3) Seiler; 83' (1:4) Seiler; 85' (1:5) Elsener; 88' (1:6) Peterhans	Attendance: 150; Referee: (Switzerland) Isler (Affoltern am Albis and Zürich)

== Sources and references ==
- dbFCZ Homepage
- Switzerland 1979–80 at RSSSF
- Swiss League Cup at RSSSF

Preceded by 1978–79	FC Zürich seasons	Succeeded by 1980–81
