= 1980–81 FC Zürich season =

FC Zürich
1980–81 season
- Owner: Alfred Zweidler
- Chairman: Alfred Zweidler
- Head coach: Daniel Jeandupeux
- Stadium: Letzigrund
- 1980–81 Nationalliga A: Swiss champions
- 1980–81 Swiss Cup: Runner-up
- 1980–81 Swiss League Cup: Winners
- Top goalscorer: League: Walter Seiler (14); All: Walter Seiler (21)

The 1980–81 season was FC Zürich's 84th season in their existence, since their foundation in 1896. It was their 22nd consecutive season in the top flight of Swiss football, following their promotion at the end of the 1957–58 season. They played their home games in the Letzigrund.

== Overview ==
The club's president since December the previous season was Alfred Zweidler, who had taken over following Edwin Nägeli death. Nägeli had held this position for over 22 years, since 1957. The newly appointed head-coach was Daniel Jeandupeux. He took over from Albert Sing and Rosario Martinelli, who had acted as joint-coaches until the end of the previous season, this following the sacking of Zlatko Čajkovski. FCZ competed not only in the domestic first-tier 1979–80 Nationalliga A, but also competed in 1979–80 Swiss Cup and in the 1979–80 Swiss League Cup. The team had not qualified for any European competitions.

== Players ==
The following is the list of the FCZ first team squad this season. It also includes players that were in the squad the day the domestic league season started, on 23 August 1980, but subsequently left the club after that date.

Note: Flags indicate national team as defined under FIFA eligibility rules; some limited exceptions apply. Players may hold more than one non-FIFA nationality.

No.	Pos.	Nation	Player
1	GK	SUI	Karl Grob (league games: 26)
—	GK	SUI	Urs Zurbuchen (league games: 2)
—	DF	SUI	Fritz Baur (league games: 20)
—	DF	SUI	Alberto Erba (league games: 11)
—	DF	SUI	Ruedi Landolt (league games: 24)
—	DF	SUI	Heinz Lüdi (league games: 24)
—	DF	SUI	Urs Schönenberger (league games: 7)
—	DF	SUI	Thomas Staub (league games: 0)
—	DF	SUI	Gianpietro Zappa (league games: 26)
—	MF	SUI	Daniel Jeandupeux (league games: 1)

No.	Pos.	Nation	Player
—	MF	SUI	Walter Iselin (league games: 25)
—	MF	YUG	Jurica Jerković (league games: 24)
—	MF	SUI	Roger Kundert (league games: 19)
—	MF	SUI	Manfred Moser (league games: 23)
—	MF	SUI	Fredi Scheiwiler (league games: 0)
—	FW	SUI	Ruedi Elsener (league games: 25)
—	FW	SUI	Winfried Kurz (league games: 5)
—	FW	SUI	Franz Peterhans (league games: 21)
—	FW	SUI	Walter Seiler (league games: 23)
—	FW	SUI	Hans-Peter Zwicker (league games: 25)

Players who left the squad

Note: Flags indicate national team as defined under FIFA eligibility rules; some limited exceptions apply. Players may hold more than one non-FIFA nationality.

No.	Pos.	Nation	Player
—	DF	SUI	Pierre-Albert Chapuisat (to Lausanne-Sport)
—	DF	SUI	Horst Thoma (to Nordstern Basel)

No.	Pos.	Nation	Player
—	MF	SUI	Georg Aliesch (to reserves)
—	MF	SUI	René Botteron (to 1. FC Köln)
—	FW	SUI	Peter Risi (to Luzern)

== Results ==
Legend

Win Draw Loss Postponed

=== Nationalliga A ===
==== Matches ====
23 August 1980 Round 1	Zürich	3–1	St. Gallen	Letzigrund, Zürich
20:00	Elsener 14' (1:0); Lüdi 76' (2:1); Seiler 85' (3:1)	FCZ summary	28' (1:1) Gisinger; (red card) 82' Graf	Attendance: 6,000; Referee: (Switzerland) Peter Scherz (Aegerten)

30 August 1980 Round 2	Chiasso	0–1	Zürich	Stadio Comunale Riva IV, Chiasso
20:00	Riva (yellow card) 65'; Graf (yellow card) 66'	FCZ summary	(yellow card) 65' Lüdi; 85' (0:1) Zappa	Attendance: 3,500; Referee: (Switzerland) Bruno Galler (Kirchdorf, Bern)

6 September 1980 Round 3	Zürich	1–3	Basel	Letzigrund, Zürich
20:00	Erba (yellow card) 37'; Zwicker (yellow card) 55'; Zwicker 56' (1:2); Elsener (yellow card) 58'	FCZ summarx Summary	18' (0:1) Marti; 39' (0:2) Stohler; (yellow card) 76' von Wartburg; 89' (1:3) Maradan	Attendance: 11,000; Referee: (Switzerland) Bruno Galler (Kirchdorf, Bern)

13 September 1980 Round 4	Sion	1–3	Zürich	Stade Tourbillon, Sion
20:00	Bregy 71' (1:0)	FCZ summary	77' (1:1) Elsener; 82' (1:2) Seiler; 84' (1:3) Jerković	Attendance: 10,300; Referee: (Switzerland) Rudolf Renggli (Luzern)

20 September 1980 Round 5	Zürich	2–1	Xamax	Letzigrund, Zürich
20:00	Seiler 29' (1:0); Zappa (yellow card) 80'; Elsener 90' (2:1)	FCZ summary	61' (1:1) Robert Lüthi	Attendance: 5,700; Referee: (Switzerland) Rolf Blattmann (Zeiningen)

4 October 1980 Round 6	Servette	1–2	Zürich	Charmilles Stadium, Geneva
20:00	Radi (yellow card) 45'; Valentini (yellow card) 80'; Coutaz 81' (1:2)	FCZ summary	11' (0:1) Elsener; 57' (0:2) Moser	Attendance: 4,500; Referee: (Switzerland) Alfred Heinis (Ammannsegg, Biberist)

8 October 1980 Round 7	Zürich	1–0	Grasshopper Club	Letzigrund, Zürich
20:00	Peterhans 77' (1:0); Jerković (yellow card) 89'	FCZ summary	(yellow card) 43' Koller; Secchi (yellow card) 68'	Attendance: 14,000; Referee: (Switzerland) Jakob Baumann (Schaffhausen)
Note: An honoring took place for goalkeeper Karl Grob for his 350th championship game.

11 October 1980 Round 8	Zürich	1–0	Luzern	Letzigrund, Zürich
20:00	Elsener 29' (1:0)	FCZ summary		Attendance: 9,500; Referee: (Switzerland) Fredy Philippoz (Sion)

18 October 1980 Round 9	Bellinzona	4–1	Zürich	Stadio Comunale Bellinzona, Bellinzona
20:00	Ivan Parini 52' (1:0); Ivan Parini 54' (2:0); Ivan Parini 64' (3:1); Ivan Parini 80' (4:1); Landolt (yellow card) 85'	FCZ summary	(yellow card) 48' Degiovannini; 59' (2:1) Zappa	Attendance: 1,000; Referee: (Switzerland) Charles-Henri Morex (Bex)

25 October 1980 Round 10	Zürich	5–1	Nordstern	Letzigrund, Zürich
20:00	Zwicker 12' (1:0); Seiler 20' (2:0); Seiler 51' (3:0); Seiler 72' (4:1); Zwicker 77' (5:1)	FCZ summary	61' (3:1) Jean-Marc Kälin	Attendance: 2,700; Referee: (Switzerland) Georges Sandoz (Corcelles-Cormondrèche, Neuchâtel)

15 November 1980 Round 11	Lausanne-Sport	2–2	Zürich	Olympique de la Pontaise, Lausanne
17:00	Kok 56' (1:1); Kok 90+1' (2:2)	FCZ summary	44' (0:1) Lüdi; (yellow card) 71' Lüdi; 76' (1:2) Erba	Attendance: 4,000; Referee: (Switzerland) Jakob Baumann (Schaffhausen)

23 November 1980 Round 12	Zürich	4–0	Young Boys	Letzigrund, Zürich
14:30	Moser 51' (1:0); Seiler 57' (2:0); Elsener 77' (3:0); Zwicker 82' (4:0)	FCZ summary		Attendance: 13,500; Referee: (Switzerland) Gottlieb Barmettler (Luzern)

7 December 1980 Round 13	Chênois	1–3	Zürich	Stade des Trois-Chêne, Chêne-Bourg
14:30	Manai (yellow card) 59'; Manai 66' (1:3); Freymond (yellow card) 78'	FCZ summary	1' (0:1) Seiler; 22' (0:2) Zwicker; (yellow card) 40' Landolt; 60' (0:3) Jerković	Attendance: 1,700; Referee: (Switzerland) Charles-Henri Morex (Bex)

1 March 1981 Round 14	St. Gallen	3–1	Zürich	Espenmoos, St. Gallen
14:30	Hafner 27' (1:1); Ritter 36' (pen.); Hafner 49' (3:1); Rietmann (yellow card) 86'; Brühwiler (yellow card) 87'	FCZ summary	13' (0:1) Seiler; (yellow card) 36' Zwicker; (yellow card) 86' Jerković	Attendance: 7,200; Referee: (Switzerland) Walter Nussbaumer (Crans-près-Céligny)
Note: The ground according to the newspaper «Sport» (2 March 1981) on the border of normality: «large areas covered with shoe-deep snow, in some places bare and marshy, partly interspersed with puddles of water»

8 March 1981 Round 15	Zürich	4–1	Chiasso	Letzigrund, Zürich
14:30	Seiler (penalty missed) 1′ Zappa 18' (1:0); Peterhans 69' (2:1); Zappa 74' (3:1); Zwicker 77' (4:1)	FCZ summary	(yellow card) 20' Melgrati; 28' (1:1) Fleury; (yellow card) 65' Manzoni; (yellow card) 67' Fleury	Attendance: 3,200; Referee: (Switzerland) Othmar Winter, (Martigny)

15 March 1981 Round 16	Basel	2–0	Zürich	St. Jakob Stadium, Basel
14:30	Tanner 56' (1:0); Marti 90' (2:0)	FCZ summary FCB summary	(yellow card) 56' Jerković; (yellow card) 88' Seiler; (yellow card) 88' Zwicker	Attendance: 13,500; Referee: (Switzerland) Jakob Baumann (Schaffhausen)
Note: Corners 5:10

21 March 1981 Round 17	Zürich	3–1	Sion	Letzigrund, Zürich
	Jerković 4' (1:0); Seiler 58' (2:1); Peterhans 81' (3:1)	FCZ summary	50' (1:1) Andrey; (yellow card) 59' Luisier; (yellow card) 76' Karlen	Attendance: 4,500; Referee: (Switzerland) Rolf Blattmann (Zeiningen)

4 April 1981 Round 18	Xamax	0–2	Zürich	Stade de la Maladière, Neuchâtel
		FCZ summary	30' (0:1) Zwicker; 64' (o.g.) (Trinchero)	Attendance: 10,200; Referee: (Switzerland) Franz Gächter (Aarau, Suhr, Aargau)

12 April 1981 Round 19	Zürich	3–2	Servette	Letzigrund, Zürich
	Zappa 41' (pen.); Seiler 64' (2:2); Seiler 68' (3:2); Seiler (yellow card) 85'	FCZ summary	27' (0:1) Bizzini; 48' (1:2) Yaghcha; (yellow card) 61' Bizzini	Attendance: 7,500; Referee: (Switzerland) Jean-Marie Macheret, (Rueyres-St-Laurent)

24 April 1981 Round 20	Luzern	1–1	Zürich	Stadion Allmend, Luzern
	(Erba) 35' (o.g.)	FCZ summary	(yellow card) 39' Iselin; 67' (1:1) Zappa	Attendance: 10,200; Referee: (Switzerland) Peter Scherz (Aegerten)

2 May 1981 Round 21	Zürich	3–1	Bellinzona	Letzigrund, Zürich
	Elsener 39' (1:1); Zappa 77' (2:1); Grob (yellow card) 83'; Zwicker 89' (3:1)	FCZ summary	34' (0:1) Parini	Attendance: 3,200; Referee: (Switzerland) Philippe Mercier (Pully)

9 May 1981 Round 22	Nordstern	1–2	Zürich	Rankhof, Basel
	Kälin 53' (1:1)	FCZ summary	13' (0:1) Seiler; 88' (1:2) Elsener	Attendance: 3,500

16 May 1981 Round 23	Zürich	2–0	Lausanne-Sport	Letzigrund, Zürich
	Seiler 24' (1:0); Peterhans 70' (2:0); Elsener (yellow card) 71'	FCZ summary	(yellow card) 47' Chapuisat	Attendance: 10,000; Referee: (Switzerland) Renzo Peduzzi (Roveredo)

23 May 1981 Round 24	Young Boys	0–0	Zürich	Wankdorf Stadium, Bern
		FCZ summary	(yellow card) 49' Landolt	Attendance: 24,000; Referee: (Switzerland) Willy Hänni, (Cugy)

4 June 1981 Round 25	Grasshopper Club	1–1	Zürich	Hardturm, Zürich
	Egli 23' (1:0)	FCZ summary	40' (1:1) Erba; (yellow card) 72' Jerković; (yellow card) 77' Lüdi	Attendance: 17,000; Referee: (Switzerland) Franz Gächter (Aarau, Suhr, Aargau)
Note: FCZ become Swiss champions 1980/81 thanks to the point gained

13 June 1981 Round 36	Zürich	6–0	Chênois	Letzigrund, Zürich
	Zwicker 10' (1:0); Zwicker 14' (2:0) (Batardon) 32' (o.g.); Jeandupeux 52' (4:0); Zwicker 73' (5:0); Zwicker 90' (6:0)	FCZ summary		Attendance: 4,200; Referee: (Switzerland) Roland Chapuis, (Courtételle)
Note: Presentation of the championship trophy after the game.

==== Final league table ====
Pos	Team	Pld	W	D	L	GF	GA	GD	Pts	Qualification
1	Zürich	26	18	4	4	57	28	+29	40	Champions, qualified for 1981–82 European Cup and entered 1981 Intertoto Cup
2	Grasshopper Club	26	11	12	3	45	24	+21	34	qualified for 1981–82 UEFA Cup and entered 1981 Intertoto Cup
3	Xamax	26	14	6	6	44	25	+19	34	qualified for 1981–82 UEFA Cup
4	Young Boys	26	11	11	4	46	33	+13	33	entered 1981 Intertoto Cup
5	Lausanne-Sport	26	12	6	8	40	29	+11	30	Swiss Cup winners, qualified for 1981–82 Cup Winners' Cup
6	Basel	26	9	10	7	48	44	+4	28	
7	Servette	26	8	10	8	38	36	+2	26	
8	Sion	26	8	8	10	35	42	−7	24	
9	Luzern	26	6	10	10	39	46	−7	22	entered 1981 Intertoto Cup
10	St. Gallen	26	7	8	11	35	42	−7	22	
11	Nordstern Basel	26	6	7	13	28	37	−9	19	
12	Bellinzona	26	7	5	14	25	46	−21	19	
13	Chiasso	26	5	8	13	28	46	−18	18	
14	Chênois	26	3	9	14	23	53	−30	15	Relegated to 1981–82 Nationalliga B

Source: rsssf.com
Rules for classification: 1) points; 2) goal difference; 3) number of goals scored.

FCZ won the Nationalliga A and this was the club's ninth league championship title to this date.

=== Swiss Cup ===
27 September 1980 Round 4	Frauenfeld	2–4	Zürich	Kleine Allmend, Frauenfeld
19:00	Hanspeter Studer 28' (1:0); Frei 82' (2:3)	FCZ summary	32' (1:1) Elsener; 59' (1:2) Seiler; 68' (1:3) Moser; 88' (2:4) Erba	Attendance: 2,800; Referee: (Switzerland) Bruno Burgener (Kriens)

9 November 1980 Round 5	Bulle	0–5	Zürich	Stade de Bouleyres, Bulle
14:30		FCZ summary	Jerković 13' (0:1); Jerković 27' (0:2); Seiler 55' (0:3); Seiler 65' (0:4); Zwicker 87' (0:5)	Attendance: 5,000; Referee: (Switzerland) Philippe Mercier (Pully)

29 March 1981 Quarter-final	Zürich	3–0	Basel	Letzigrund, Zürich
15:00	Elsener (yellow card) 15'; Seiler 24' (1:0); Elsener 42' (2:0); Seiler 70' (3:0); Baur (yellow card) 88'	FCZ summary FCB summary		Attendance: 14,000; Referee: (Switzerland) Peter Scherz (Aegerten)
Note: The match was originally scheduled for 29 November 1980, but had to be postponed due to snow. Corners: 11:1

20 April 1981 Semi-final	Sion	0–0 (a.e.t.)	Zürich	Stade de Tourbillon, Sion
		FCZ summary	(yellow card) 107' Lüdi; (yellow card) 114' Zwicker	Attendance: 13,000; Referee: (Switzerland) Ulrich Nyffenegger (Nidau)

5 May 1981 Semi-final. replay	Zürich	4–0	Sion	Letzigrund, Zürich
	Peterhans 8' (1:0); Zappa 31' (2:0); Moser 45' (3:0); Zappa 88' (4:0)	FCZ summary		Attendance: 8,735; Referee: (Switzerland) Georges Sandoz (Corcelles-Cormondrèche, Neuchâtel)

8 June 1981 Final	Lausanne-Sport	4–3 (a.e.t.)	Zürich	Wankdorf Stadium, Bern
15:00	Raczynski (yellow card) 4'; Kok 47' (1:1); Mauron 65' (2:2); Crescenzi 97' (3:2); Crescenzi 99' (4:2)	Fussball-Schweiz summary	38' (0:1) Lüdi; 52' (pen.) Zappa; (yellow card) 76' Zappa; (red card) 103' Iselin; 107' (4:3) Peterhans; (yellow card) 117' Lüdi	Attendance: 40,000; Referee: (Switzerland) Jakob Baumann (Schaffhausen)

Lausanne-Sport won the cup and this was the club's seventh cup title to this date.

=== Swiss League Cup ===
16 August 1980 First round	Basel	1–2	Zürich	Stadion Schützenmatte, Basel
17:00	Lauscher 86' (1:2)	FCB summary FCZ summary	15' (0:1) Lüdi; (yellow card) 18' Moser; 56' (0:2) Zwicker	Attendance: 2,500; Referee: (Switzerland) Jakob Baumann (Schaffhausen)

1 November 1980 Round 2	Chiasso	0–2	Zürich	Stadio Comunale Riva IV, Chiasso
	Riva (yellow card) 15'	FCZ summary	60' (0:1) Landolt; 85' (0:2) Seiler	Attendance: 1,500; Referee: (Switzerland) Peter Scherz (Aegerten)

17 March 1981 Quarter-final	Servette	1–2	Zürich	Charmilles Stadium, Geneva
20:00	Mustapha 82' (1:2)	FCZ summary Servette summary	68' (0:1) Peterhans; (yellow card) 75' Kundert; 76' (0:2) Seiler	Attendance: 2,500; Referee: (Switzerland) Georges Sandoz (Corcelles-Cormondrèche, Neuchâtel)

20 May 1981 Semi-final	Zürich	3–0	St. Gallen	Letzigrund, Zürich
20:00	Kurz 7' (1:0); Zappa 55' (pen. 2:0); Zappa 70' (3:0)	FCZ summary		Attendance: 1,750; Referee: (Switzerland) Philippe Mercier (Pully)

26 May 1981 Final, first leg	Lausanne-Sport	1–2	Zürich	Olympique de la Pontaise, Lausanne
20:00	Tachet 52' (1:2)	FCZ summary	21' (0:1) Zwicker; (red card) 27' Erba; 36' (0:2) Peterhans	Attendance: 4,200; Referee: (Switzerland) Alfred Heinis (Ammannsegg, Biberist)

8 September 1981 Final, second leg	Zürich	0–0 (2–1 agg.)	Lausanne-Sport	Letzigrund, Zürich
20:00		FCZ summary	(yellow card) 72' Lei-Ravello	Attendance: 1,050; Referee: (Switzerland) Othmar Winter (Martigny)
Note: The second leg of the 1980/81 League Cup final could only be played now due to scheduling problems.

FCZ won the League Cup, winning the final 2–1 on aggregate. This was the club's first League Cup title.

=== Friendly matches ===
==== Pre- and mid-season ====
23 July 1980 Exhibition game	Grenchen	0–7	Zürich	Stadion Brühl, Grenchen
		FCZ summary	(0:1) Landolt (0:2) Jerković (0:3) Jerković (0:4) Jerković (0:5) Seiler (0:6) Seiler (0:7) Seiler	Attendance: 1,200; Referee: (Switzerland) Werner Bösch (Sutz-Lattrigen)

1 August 1980 Edi Naegeli Memorial Tournament	Zürich	1–3	Eintracht Frankfurt	Letzigrund, Zürich
	Seiler 79' (1:2)	RSSSF summary Eintracht Frankfurt report	31' (0:1) Pezzey; 61' (0:2) Körbel; 88' (1:3) Lottermann	Attendance: 3,200; Referee: (Switzerland) Alfred Heinis (Ammannsegg, Biberist)
Note: Edi Naegeli Memorial Tournament: Semi-final.

2 August 1980 Edi Naegeli Memorial Tournament	Zürich	1–1 (3–2 p)	Leeds United	Letzigrund, Zürich
	Jerković 53' (1:0)	FCZ summary	61' (1:1) Sabella; (yellow card) 72' Hamson	Attendance: 3,000; Referee: (Switzerland) Jean-Marie Macheret, (Rueyres-St-Laurent)
	Penalties
	Penalty missed Penalty scored		Penalty missed Penalty scored
Note: Edi Naegeli Memorial Tournament: Match for third place. In the penalty shootout Grob saved two of the Leeds penalties.

6 August 1980 Exhibition game	FC Amicitia Neuhausen	0–10	Zürich	Langriet, Neuhausen am Rheinfall
		FCZ summary	9' (0:1) Seiler; 24' (0:2) Moser; 35' (0:3) Peterhans; 39' (0:4) Seiler; 41' (0:5) Jerković; 43' (0:6) Seiler; 48' (0:7) Jeandupeux; 55' (pen.) Moser; 58' (0:9) Schönenberger; 85' (0:10) Jeandupeux	Attendance: 1,100; Referee: (Switzerland) Jakob Baumann (Schaffhausen)

9 August 1980 Exhibition game	West Bromwich Albion	0–0	Zürich	Split, Croatia
		FCZ summary		Attendance: 4,000
Note: Match as part of the Trofej Marjan

10 August 1980 Exhibition game	Hajduk Split	3–1	Zürich	Split, Croatia
	Vujović 12' (1:0); Vujović 18' (2:0); Vujović 19' (3:0)	FCZ summary	45' (3:1) Jerković	Attendance: 20,000
Note: Match as part of the Trofej Marjan

12 August 1980 Philips-Cup, Semi-final	Zürich	1–1 (6–5 p)	Servette	Wankdorf Stadium, Bern
	Moser 58' (1:1)	FCZ summary	3' (0:1) Radi	Attendance: 2,500; Referee: (Switzerland) Ulrich Nyffenegger (Nidau)
	Penalties
	Lüdi (penalty scored); Moser (penalty missed); Peterhans (penalty scored); Seiler (penalty scored); Zappa (penalty scored); Jerković (penalty scored); Elsener (penalty scored)		(penalty scored) Cucinotta; (penalty missed) Bizzini; (penalty scored) Schnyder; (penalty scored) Mustapha; (penalty scored) Zwygart; (penalty scored) Seramondi; (penalty missed) Sarrasin
Note: Semi-final Philips-Cup

19 August 1980 Philips Cup, Final	Basel	7–2	Zürich	Wankdorf Stadium, Bern
20:30	Marti 31' (1:1); Gaisser 33' (2:1); Schär 44' (3:1); Schär 47' (4:1); Schär 58' (5:1); Marti 66' (6:1); Küttel 68' (7:1)	FCZ summary FCB summary	25' (0:1) Zappa; 74' (7:2) Seiler	Attendance: 4,000; Referee: (Switzerland) Jean-Marie Macheret, (Rueyres-St-Laurent)
Note: Philips Cup Final

23 September 1980 Mid-season	Zürich	9–2	FC Blue Stars Zürich	Letzigrund, Zürich
	Goal	FCZ summary	Goal	Referee: (Switzerland) Burgermeister (Zürich)

==== Winter break ====
22 January 1981 Exhibition game	ASC Jeanne d'Arc	1–2	Zürich	Dakar, Senegal
	55' (1:1)	FCZ summary	49' (0:1) Zwicker; 55' (1:2) Jerković	Attendance: 8,000; Referee: (Senegal) Wil

30 January 1981 Exhibition game	Africa Sports National	0–1	Zürich	Abidjan, Ivory Coast
		FCZ summary	(0:1) Seiler; (yellow card) (yellow-red card) Zappa	Attendance: 29,000

1 February 1981 Exhibition game	ASEC Mimosas	4–4	Zürich	Abidjan, Ivory Coast
	Goal	FCZ summary	Zwicker; Peterhans; Jerković (pen.) Zappa	Attendance: 39,000

4 February 1981 Exhibition game	ASC Bouaké	2–4	Zürich	Bouaké, Ivory Coast
	Goal	FCZ summary	(pen.) Zappa; Peterhans; Kundert; Jerković

14 February 1981 Exhibition game	Kriens	0–3	Zürich	Stadion Kleinfeld, Kriens
		FCZ summary	8' (pen.) Zappa; 31' (0:2) Zwicker; 90' (0:3) Lüdi	Attendance: 300; Referee: (Switzerland) Rudolf Renggli (Luzern)

15 February 1981 Exhibition game	FC Frauenfeld	0–1	Zürich	Kleine Allmend, Frauenfeld
		FCZ summary	18' (0:1) Zappa	Attendance: 600; Referee: (Switzerland) Marino Paggiola, (Appenzell)

21 February 1981 Exhibition game	Zürich	4–0	Lugano	Centro Sportivo Comunale, Mendrisio
	(penalty missed) 21′ Zappa; 29' (0:1) Zwicker; 62' (0:2) Seiler; 64' (0:3) Lüdi; 89' (0:4) Lüdi	FCZ summary		Attendance: 300; Referee: (Switzerland) Papa (Agno)
Note: Tournament in Mendriso, first game at RSSSF

22 February 1981 Exhibition game	Zürich	0–0	Young Boys	Centro Sportivo Comunale, Mendrisio
		FCZ summary	(yellow card) 79' Kundert	Attendance: 800; Referee: (Switzerland) Marco Raveglia (San Vittore)
Note: Tournament in Mendriso, second game at RSSSF

== Sources and references ==
- dbFCZ Homepage
- Switzerland 1980–81 at RSSSF
- Swiss League Cup at RSSSF
- Edi Naegeli Memorial Tournament at RSSSF
- Tournament in Mendriso at RSSSF

Preceded by 1979–80	FC Zürich seasons	Succeeded by 1981–82
