= 1978–79 FC Zürich season =

FC Zürich
1978–79 season
- Owner: Edwin Nägeli
- Chairman: Edwin Nägeli
- Head coach: Zlatko Čajkovski
- Stadium: Letzigrund
- Nationalliga A: Runner-up
- Swiss Cup: Round 5
- 1978–79 Swiss League Cup: Quarter-finals
- 1978 Intertoto Cup: Group runner-up
- Top goalscorer: League: Peter Risi (16); All: Peter Risi (25)

The 1978–79 season was FC Zürich's 82nd season in their existence, since their foundation in 1896. It was their 20th consecutive season in the top flight of Swiss football, following their promotion at the end of the 1957–58 season. They played their home games in the Letzigrund.

== Overview ==
The club's president at this time was Edwin Nägeli, who had held this position since 1957. The German Friedhelm Konietzka had been the first team head coach over the last seven seasons, since 1971, but his contract was no longer extended and he left the club to become head-coach of Young Boys. The Yugoslav and Croatian Zlatko Čajkovski was appointed as new head-coach for the FCZ first team. FCZ competed not only in the domestic first-tier 1978–79 Nationalliga A, but also competed in 1978–79 Swiss Cup and in the 1978–79 Swiss League Cup. They also entered into the 1978 Intertoto Cup, but the team had not qualified for the UEFA European competions.

== Players ==
The following is the list of the FCZ first team squad this season. It also includes players that were in the squad the day the domestic league season started, on 12 August 1978, but subsequently left the club after that date.

Note: Flags indicate national team as defined under FIFA eligibility rules; some limited exceptions apply. Players may hold more than one non-FIFA nationality.

No.	Pos.	Nation	Player
1	GK	SUI	Karl Grob (league games: 28)
—	GK	SUI	Urs Zurbuchen (league games: 7)
—	DF	SUI	Fritz Baur (league games: 17)
—	DF	SUI	Pierre-Albert Chapuisat (league games: 24)
—	DF	SUI	Alberto Erba (league games: 4)
—	DF	SUI	Pius Fischbach (league games: 17)
—	DF	SUI	Max Heer (league games: 15)
—	DF	SUI	Ruedi Landolt (league games: 17)
—	DF	SUI	Heinz Lüdi (league games: 31)
—	DF	SUI	Horst Thoma (league games: 0)
—	DF	SUI	Gianpietro Zappa (league games: 32)

No.	Pos.	Nation	Player
—	MF	SUI	Georg Aliesch (league games: 2)
—	MF	SUI	René Botteron (league games: 32)
—	MF	SUI	Albert Hohl (league games: 0)
—	MF	YUG	Jurica Jerković (league games: 32)
—	MF	SUI	Roger Kundert (league games: 31)
—	MF	SUI	Manfred Moser (league games: 7)
—	MF	SUI	Fredi Scheiwiler (league games: 27)
—	FW	SUI	Rolf Meier (league games: 5)
—	FW	SUI	Winfried Kurz (league games: 7)
—	FW	SUI	Peter Risi (league games: 31)
—	FW	SUI	Hans-Peter Zwicker (league games: 28)

Players who left the squad

Note: Flags indicate national team as defined under FIFA eligibility rules; some limited exceptions apply. Players may hold more than one non-FIFA nationality.

No.	Pos.	Nation	Player
—	GK	SUI	Ruedi Hauser (to FC Küsnacht (ZH))
—	DF	SUI	Giuseppe Sanfilippo (to SC Zug)
—	DF	SUI	Pirmin Stierli (retired)

No.	Pos.	Nation	Player
—	MF	SUI	Silvio Hartmann (to Aarau)
—	MF	SUI	Conny Torstensson (to Åtvidabergs FF)
—	FW	SUI	Franco Cucinotta (to Chiasso)
—	FW	SUI	Urs Dickenmann (to Kriens)

== Results ==
Legend

Win Draw Loss Postponed

=== Nationalliga A ===
==== League matches ====
12 August 1977 Round 1	Zürich	1–1	Xamax	Letzigrund, Zürich
	Risi 19' (1:0)	FCZ summary	21' (o.g.) (Lüdi)	Attendance: 7,500; Referee: (Switzerland) Franz Gächter (Aarau, Suhr, Aargau)

19 August 1978 Round 2	Grasshopper Club	2–1	Zürich	Hardturm, Zürich
	Sulser 13' (1:0); Egli 77' (2:1)	FCZ summary	28' (1:1) Jerković; (yellow card) 80' Lüdi	Attendance: 14,000; Referee: (Switzerland) Jakob Baumann (Schaffhausen)

23 August 1978 Round 3	Chênois	3–0	Zürich	Stade des Trois-Chêne, Thônex
	Manai 16' (1:0); López (yellow card) 34'; Yaghcha 77' (2:0); Yaghcha 80' (3:0)	FCZ summary		Attendance: 4,500; Referee: (Switzerland) Denis Perrenoud (Neuchâtel)

26 August 1978 Round 4	Zürich	5–0	St. Gallen	Letzigrund, Zürich
	Zwicker 20' (1:0); Risi 35' (2:0); Risi 40' (3:0); Zwicker 52' (4:0); Lüdi 78' (5:0)	FCZ summary		Attendance: 6,500; Referee: (Switzerland) Othmar Winter, (Martigny)

2 September 1978 Round 5	Chiasso	1–2	Zürich	Stadio Comunale Riva IV, Chiasso
	Salzgeber 72' (1:2)	FCZ summary	49' (0:1) Jerković; 65' (0:2) Jerković; (yellow card) 78' Zwicker; (yellow card) 72' Baur	Attendance: 7,000; Referee: (Switzerland) Ernest Guignet (Yverdon-les-Bains)
Note: Corners 13:5

9 September 1978 Round 6	Zürich	3–0	Servette	Letzigrund, Zürich
	Risi 31' (1:0); Risi 37' (2:0); Heer (yellow card) 66'; Botteron 77' (3:0); Chapuisat (yellow card) 81'	FCZ summary	(yellow card) 18' Trinchero	Attendance: 9,000; Referee: (Switzerland) André Daina (Éclépens)

16 September 1978 Round 7	Sion	2–2	Zürich	Stade Tourbillon, Sion
	Schneider 77' (1:2); Ruberti 79' (2:2)	FCZ summary	50' (0:1) Zappa; 59' (0:2) Risi	Attendance: 3,300; Referee: (Switzerland) Franz Gächter (Aarau, Suhr, Aargau)

24 September 1978 Round 8	Zürich	1–1	Basel	Letzigrund, Zürich
14:30	Risi (penalty missed) 17′ Botteron 36' (1:0); Jerković (yellow card) 83'	FCZ sunnary Summary	46' (1:1) Marti	Attendance: 14,000; Referee: (Switzerland) Bruno Galler (Kirchdorf, Bern)

1 October 1978 Round 9	Zürich	3–3	Lausanne-Sport	Letzigrund, Zürich
	Zappa 5' (1:0); Botteron 53' (2:1); Baur 66' (3:3)	FCZ summary	35' (1:1) Künzli; 56' (o.g.) (Chapuisat); 58' (2:3) Diserens; (yellow card) 87' Favre	Attendance: 9,000; Referee: (Switzerland) Jean-Marie Macheret (Rueyres-St-Laurent)
Note: Corners 15:5

15 October 1978 Round 10	Nordstern Basel	1–0	Zürich	Stadion Rankhof, Basel
		FCZ summary	5' (pen.) Botteron; (yellow card) 90' Lüdi	Attendance: 6,000; Referee: (Switzerland) Jean-Marie Macheret (Rueyres-St-Laurent)

22 October 1978 Round 11	Zürich	4–1	Young Boys	Letzigrund, Zürich
	Zwicker 15' (1:0); Risi 27' (2:1); Fischbach (yellow card) 42'; Zappa 56' (3:1); Botteron 76' (4:1)	FCZ summary	17' (1:1) Küttel; (yellow card) 44' Hussner	Attendance: 16,000; Referee: (Switzerland) Rudolf Rettig (Gerlafingen)

29 October 1978 Round 12	Xamax	0–2	Zürich	Stade de la Maladière, Neuchâtel
		FCZ summary	63' (0:1) Risi; 85' (0:2) Jerković	Attendance: 6,300; Referee: (Switzerland) René Maire (Chêne-Bougeries, Genève)
Note: New floodlight system installed at the Maladière; set to 600 lux.

5 November 1978 Round 13	Zürich	1–1	Grasshopper Club	Letzigrund, Zürich
	Botteron 26' (pen.); Lüdi (yellow card) 43'; Fischbach (yellow card) 89'	FCZ summary	10' (0:1) Sulser	Attendance: 26,000; Referee: (Switzerland) André Daina (Éclépens)

19 November 1978 Round 14	St. Gallen	0–2	Zürich	Espenmoos, St. Gallen
		FCZ summary	35' (0:1) Zwicker; 61' (0:2) Risi	Attendance: 12,300; Referee: (Switzerland) Jean-Marie Macheret (Rueyres-St-Laurent)

26 November 1978 Round 15	Zürich	2–0	Chiasso	Letzigrund, Zürich
	Kundert (yellow card) 31'; Zwicker 53' (0:1); Risi 64'	FCZ summary	(yellow card) 35' Rehmann	Attendance: 4,500; Referee: (Switzerland) Werner Bösch (Sutz-Lattrigen)

3 December 1978 Round 16	Servette	1–1	Zürich	Charmilles Stadium, Geneva
	Weber 23' (1:0); Valentini (yellow card) 78'	FCZ summary	(yellow card) 79' Jerković; (yellow card) 85' Lüdi; 88' (1:1) Zappa	Attendance: 12,500; Referee: (Switzerland) Franz Gächter (Aarau, Suhr, Aargau)

4 March 1979 Round 17	Zürich	4–0	Letzigrund, Zürich
	Kundert 7' (1:0); Baur 14' (2:0); Jerković 54' (3:0); Jerković 62' (4:0)	FCZ summary	Attendance: 4,500; Referee: (Switzerland) Gottlieb Barmettler (Luzern)

11 March 1979 Round 18	Basel	1–0	Zürich	St. Jakob Stadium, Basel
15:00	Demarmels 5' (1:0); Geisser (yellow card) 44'; Demarmels (yellow card) 65'	Summary	(yellow card) 45' Lüdi	Attendance: 10,000; Referee: (Switzerland) André Daina

17 March 1979 Round 19	Lausanne-Sport	1–2	Zürich	Olympique de la Pontaise, Lausanne
20:00	(Zappa) 56' (o.g.); Đorđić (yellow card) 81'	FCZ summary	51' (0:1) Zappa; 68' (1:2) Zappa	Attendance: 2,500; Referee: (Switzerland) Rudolf Renggli (Luzern)
Note: Before the game, Lausanne captain Burgener presents Botteron with a bouquet of flowers for his 100th consecutive championship game.

1 April 1979 Round 20	Zürich	5–0	Nordstern Basel	Letzigrund, Zürich
14:30	Chapuisat (yellow card) 43'; Zappa 51' (1:0); Botteron 54' (2:0); Risi 64' (3:0); Botteron 74' (4:0); Zwicker 81' (5:0)	FCZ summary		Attendance: 4,200; Referee: (Switzerland) Jean-Marie Macheret (Rueyres-St-Laurent)

4 April 1979 Round 21	Zürich	6–0	Chênois	Letzigrund, Zürich
20:15	Zwicker 23' (1:0); Jerković 24' (2:0); Botteron 33' (3:0); Zappa 43' (4:0); Scheiwiler 85' (5:0); Scheiwiler 90' (6:0)	FCZ summary		Attendance: 3,600; Referee: (Switzerland) Denis Perrenoud (Neuchâtel)

7 April 1979 Round 22	Young Boys	1–3	Zürich	Wankdorf Stadium, Bern
20:15	Hussner 15' (1:0); Odermatt (yellow card) 63'	FCZ summary	49' (1:1) Botteron; 51' (1:2) Zwicker; (yellow card) 58' Kundert; 68' (1:3) Baur; (yellow card) 81' Grob	Attendance: 15,000; Referee: (Switzerland) Franz Gächter (Aarau, Suhr, Aargau)

==== Qualifying phase table ====
Pos	Team	Pld	W	D	L	GF	GA	GD	Pts	Qualification
1	FC Zürich	22	13	6	3	51	19	+32	32	To championship round
2	Servette FC	22	12	6	4	56	23	+33	30	To championship round
3	Grasshopper Club Zürich	22	9	9	4	35	24	+11	27	To championship round
4	FC Basel	22	10	6	6	36	29	+7	26	To championship round
5	BSC Young Boys	22	11	4	7	39	34	+5	26	To championship round
6	FC St. Gallen	22	11	4	7	34	34	0	26	To championship round
7	Neuchâtel Xamax	22	8	8	6	42	33	+9	24	To relegation play-out round
8	CS Chênois	22	9	4	9	30	32	−2	22	To relegation play-out round
9	Lausanne Sports	22	6	3	13	28	40	−12	15	To relegation play-out round
10	FC Chiasso	22	5	3	14	20	46	−26	13	To relegation play-out round
11	FC Nordstern Basel	22	2	8	12	19	44	−25	12	To relegation play-out round
12	FC Sion	22	3	5	14	20	52	−32	11	To relegation play-out round

Source: rsssf.com
Rules for classification: 1) Points; 2) Goal difference; 3) Goals scored;

==== Championship group matches ====
22 April 1979 Round 1	Zürich	2–3	Servette	Letzigrund, Zürich
	Risi 53' (1:1); Risi 87' (pen.); Botteron (penalty missed) 76′	FCZ summary	43' (0:1) Andrey; 63' (1:2) Schnyder; 64' (1:3) Bizzini	Attendance: 18,000; Referee: (Switzerland) Jakob Baumann (Schaffhausen)

28 April 1979 Round 2	Young Boys	0–1	Zürich	Wankdorf Stadium, Bern
		FCZ summary	64' (0:1) Zwicker; (yellow card) 67' Erba	Attendance: 9,000; Referee: (Switzerland) Othmar Winter, (Martigny)

8 May 1979 Round 3	Zürich	3–3	Grasshopper Club	Letzigrund, Zürich
	Botteron 12' (1:0); Zappa 43' (2:2); Risi 68' (3:2)	FCZ summary	26' (1:1) Meier; 28' (1:2) Hermann; 76' (3:3) Hermann	Attendance: 20,000; Referee: (Switzerland) Gottlieb Barmettler (Luzern)

12 May 1979 Round 4	Basel	1–3	Zürich	St. Jakob Stadium, Basel
20:00	Marti 65' (1:1)	Summary	3' (0:1) Risi; (yellow card) 25' Lüdi; (yellow card) 53' Zappa; 80' (1:2) Risi; 90' (1:3) Zwicker	Attendance: 18,500; Referee: (Switzerland) Peter Scherz (Aegerten)

17 May 1979 Round 5	Zürich	2–1	St. Gallen	Letzigrund, Zürich
	Botteron 3' (1:0); Jerković 65' (2:0); Kundert (yellow card) 81'	FCZ summary	(yellow card) 58' Hafner; 67' (2:1) Labhart; (yellow card) 82' Fleury	Attendance: 5,400; Referee: (Switzerland) André Daina (Éclépens)

26 May 1979 Round 6	Servette	1–0	Zürich	Charmilles Stadium, Geneva
	Schnyder 75' (1:0); Trinchero (yellow card) 67'; Hamberg (red card) 88'	FCZ summary	(yellow card) 88' Lüdi	Attendance: 22,500; Referee: (Switzerland) Ernst Dörflinger (Grenchen and Basel)

31 May 1979 Round 7	Zürich	1–0	Young Boys	Letzigrund, Zürich
	Zwicker 5' (1:0)	FCZ summary		Attendance: 4,500; Referee: (Switzerland) Jean-Marie Macheret (Rueyres-St-Laurent)

13 June 1979 Round 8	Grasshopper Club	2–1	Zürich	Hardturm, Zürich
	Egli 77' (1:1); Bauer 81' (pen. 2:1)	FCZ summary	(yellow card) 44' Lüdi; 46' (0:1) Scheiwiler; (yellow card) 60' Kundert; (yellow card) 69' Baur	Attendance: 11,000; Referee: (Switzerland) André Daina (Éclépens)

16 June 1979 Round 9	Zürich	4–2	Basel	Letzigrund, Zürich
20:00	Botteron 5' (1:0); Baur 26' (2:0); Botteron 38' (3:0); Zwicker 70' (4:0); Scheiwiler (yellow card)	Summary	43' (3:1) Baldinger; 46' (3:2) Lauscher; (yellow card) Tanner	Attendance: 4,000; Referee: (Switzerland) Werner Bösch (Sutz-Lattrigen)

23 June 1979 Round 10	St. Gallen	1–2	Zürich	Espenmoos, St. Gallen
	Stöckl 87' (pen.)	FCZ summary	(yellow card) 14' Jerković; 30' (0:1) Scheiwiler; 39' (0:2) Zwicker	Attendance: 7,000; Referee: (Switzerland) Gottlieb Barmettler (Luzern)

==== Championship table ====
Pos	Team	Pld	W	D	L	GF	GA	GD	BP	Pts	Qualification
1	Servette	10	10	0	0	23	5	+18	15	35	Champions and Swiss Cup winners qualified for 1979–80 European Cup
2	Zürich	10	6	1	3	19	14	+5	16	29	qualified for 1979–80 UEFA Cup and entered 1979 Intertoto Cup
3	Grasshopper Club	10	3	3	4	11	13	−2	14	23	qualified for 1979–80 UEFA Cup and entered 1979 Intertoto Cup
4	St. Gallen	10	2	3	5	8	11	−3	13	20	entered 1978 Intertoto Cup
5	Young Boys	10	1	4	5	5	17	−12	13	19	Cup finalist qualified for 1979–80 European Cup Winners' Cup
6	Basel	10	2	1	7	18	24	−6	13	18	

Source: rsssf.com

=== Swiss Cup ===
7 October 1978 Round 4	Red Star	1–6	Zürich	Letzigrund, Zürich
	Schäuble 88' (1:5)	FCZ summary	4' (pen.) Botteron; 52' (0:2) Risi; 71' (0:3) Zwicker; 74' (0:4) Risi; 86' (0:5) Scheiwiler; 90' (1:6) Botteron	Attendance: 1,600; Referee: (Switzerland) Rudolf Affolter (Bülach)
Note: From the 76th minute onwards, Red Stars were down to ten men: Schmid left the field injured and the substitution quota had already been used up.

10 December 1978 Round 5	Zürich	1–3	Basel	Letzigrund, Zürich
14:30	Botteron (1:1); Zwicker (yellow card)	FCZ summary FCB summary	36' (0:1) Stohler; 68' (1:2) Marti; (yellow card) Demarmels; 89' (1:3) Lauscher	Attendance: 13,800; Referee: (Switzerland) Gottlieb Barmettler (Luzern)

=== Swiss League Cup ===
26 July 1978 Round 1	Ibach	2–6	Zürich	Gerbihof, Ibach
	Suter 58' (1:4); Schibig 74' (pen. 2:6)	FCZ summary	20' (1:0) Scheiwiler; 26' (0:2) Botteron; 28' (pen- 0:3) Risi; 36' (o.g.) (Suter); 61' (1:5) Jerković; 67' (1:6) Aliesch; (yellow card) Fischbach; (yellow card) Kundert	Attendance: 1,200; Referee: Marco Raveglia (San Vittore, Switzerland)

5 August 1978 Round 2	Wettingen	0–5	Zürich	Stadion Altenburg, Wettingen
	Strasser (penalty missed) 65′	FCZ summary	39' (0:1) Baur; 62' (0:2) Risi; 65' (0:3) Zwicker; 75' (0:4) Zwicker; 82' (pen.) Botteron	Attendance: 2,300; Referee: (Switzerland) André Daina (Éclépens)

11 November 1978 Quarter-final	Xamax	3–1	Zürich	Stade de la Maladière (1924), Neuchâtel
	Zaugg 49' (1:1); Gross 51' (2:1); Rub 88' (3:1)	FCZ summary	39' (0:1) Risi	Attendance: 2,000; Referee: (Switzerland) Gottlieb Barmettler (Luzern)

=== Intertoto Cup ===
==== Group 5 matches ====
Matches

24 June 1978 Matchday 1	Maccabi Tel Aviv (Israel)	0–2	(Switzerland) Zürich	Tel Aviv
		FCZ summary	52' (0:1) Risi; 80' (0:2) Risi	Attendance: 2,500

1 July 1978 Matchday 2	Zürich (Switzerland)	0–2	(Sweden) Malmö FF	Linthstrasse, Tuggen
		FCZ summary	22' (0:1) Sjöberg; 82' (0:2) Sjöberg	Attendance: 2,000; Referee: (Switzerland) Rudolf Renggli (Luzern/Stans)

8 July 1978 Matchday 3	Zürich (Switzerland)	2–0	(Austria) First Vienna	Stadion Kleinfeld, Kriens
	Risi 58' (1:0); Scheiwiler 61' (2:0)	FCZ summary	(yellow card) Kuhnert	Attendance: 1,200; Referee: (Switzerland) Jakob Baumann (Schaffhausen)

02 July 1978 Matchday 4	Malmö FF (Sweden)	2–0	(Switzerland) Zürich	Malmö Stadion, Malmö
	Ljungberg 37' (1:0); Sjöberg 41' (2:0); Kristensson (red card)	FCZ summary		Attendance: 2,150; Referee: (Sweden) Erik Fredriksson

22 July 1978 Matchday 5	First Vienna (Austria)	0–2	(Switzerland) Zürich	Stadion Wiener Neustadt, Vienna
		FCZ summary	35' (0:1) Risi; 89' (0:2) Botteron	Attendance: 2,500; Referee: (Austria) Adolf Mathias

29 July 1978 Matchday 6	Zürich (Switzerland)	0–3	(Israel) Maccabi Tel Aviv	Letzigrund, Zürich
		FCZ summary	3' (0:1) Peretz; 25' (0:2) Tabak; 78' (0:3) Tabak	Attendance: 2,500; Referee: (Switzerland) Bruno Galler (Kirchdorf, Bern)

==== Final group table ====
Pos	Team	Pld	W	D	L	GF	GA	GD	Pts	MAL	ZÜR	MTA	FVI
1	(Sweden) Malmö FF	6	5	1	0	11	3	+8	11	—	2–0	3–1	2–1
2	(Switzerland) Zürich	6	3	0	3	6	7	−1	6	0–2	—	0–3	2–0
3	(Israel) Maccabi Tel Aviv	6	2	0	4	10	10	0	4	0–1	0–2	—	5–1
4	(Austria) First Vienna	6	1	1	4	6	13	−7	3	1–1	0–2	3–1	—

Source: mogiel.net
Rules for classification: 1) Points; 2) Goal difference; 3) Goals scored; 4) Head-to-head points; 5) Away goals scored; 6) Draw.

=== Friendly matches ===
==== Pre-season ====
30 July 1978 Exhibition game	Zürich	3–3	Luzern	St. Martin, Cazis
	Botteron 31' (1:0); Botteron 59' (2:1); Scheiwiler 74' (3:2)	FCZ summary	50' (1:1) Wiprächtiger; 72' (2:2) Binder; 87' (3:3) Vögeli	Attendance: 750; Referee: (Switzerland) René Kellenberger (Herisau)
Note: Promotional match to mark the 10th anniversary of FC Cazis

2 August 1978 Exhibition game	Young Boys	3–1	Zürich	Wankdorf Stadium, Bern
	Küttel 63' (1:0); Brechbühl 67' (2:0); Hussner 83' (3:1)	FCZ summary	74' (2:1) Jerković	Attendance: 7,500; Referee: (Switzerland) Isler (Affoltern am Albis and Zürich)
Note: Philips-Cup semi-final

8 August 1978 Exhibition game	Grasshopper Club	3–6	Zürich	Wankdorf Stadium, Bern
	Egli 10' (1:0); Egli 65' (2:5); Egli 69' (3:5)	FCZ summary	24' (1:1) Fischbach; 29' (1:2) Risi; 35' (1:3) Botteron; 51' (1:4) Chapuisat; 55' (1:5) Risi; 82' (3:6) Botteron	Attendance: 4,000; Referee: (Switzerland) Bruno Galler (Kirchdorf, Bern)
Note: Philips-Cup, game for 3rd place

12 September 1978 Exhibition game	FC Gossau	2–8	Zürich	Sportanlage Buechenwald, Gossau
	Goal	FCZ summary	Goal

20 September 1978 Exhibition game	Zürich	2–1	AC Milan	Letzigrund, Zürich
	Risi 15' (1:0); Zwicker 67' (2:1)	FCZ summary	30' (1:1) Capello	Attendance: 20,150; Referee: (Switzerland) (Switzerland) Isler (Affoltern am Albis and Zürich)
Note: A farewell match for Köbi Kuhn, organized by Kuhn himself. The net profit of the event (approx. CHF 200,000) went to Kuhn.

==== Winter break ====
11 February 1979 Exhibition game	Zürich	11–2	SC Zug	Letzigrund (training pitch), Zürich
	Botteron (1:0); Botteron (2:0); Botteron (3:0); Botteron (4:0); Botteron (5:0); Botteron (6:0); Jerković (7:0); Zappa (8:0); Meier (9:0); Lüdi (10:0); Risi (11:0)	FCZ summary	(11:1) Gacesa (11:2) Gacesa	Attendance: 400; Referee: (Switzerland) ?

14 February 1979 Exhibition game	Zürich	1–2	VfB Stuttgart	Letzigrund, Zürich
	Risi 36' (1:2)	FCZ summary	3' (0:1) Hoeness; 20' (0:2) Müller	Attendance: 6,200; Referee: (Switzerland) Jakob Baumann (Schaffhausen)

17 February 1979 Exhibition game	Dinamo Zagreb	0–0	Zürich	Stadion Maksimir, Zagreb
		FCZ summary		Attendance: 13,000

21 February 1979 Exhibition game	FC Regensdorf	0–4	Zürich
		FCZ summary	Goal

23 February 1979 Exhibition game	Bellinzona	0–2	Zürich	Stadio Comunale Bellinzona, Bellinzona
		FCZ summary	42' (0:1) Zappa; 67' (0:2) Botteron	Attendance: 300; Referee: (Switzerland) Prudente (Bellinzona)

24 February 1979 Exhibition game	Lugano	1–3	Zürich	Cornaredo, Lugano
	Brenna 52' (1:3)	FCZ summary	33' (0:1) Zappa; 42' (0:2) Zappa; 48' (0:3) Risi	Referee: (Switzerland) Prudente (Bellinzona)

28 February 1979 Exhibition game	FC Frauenfeld	0–1	Zürich	Kleine Allmend, Frauenfeld
		FCZ summary	82' (0:1) Zappa	Attendance: 400; Referee: (Switzerland) Rudolf Affolter (Bülach)

27 March 1979 Exhibition game	FC Blue Stars Zürich	0–3	Zürich	Letzigrund (training pitch), Zürich
		FCZ summary	29' (0:1) Scheiwiler; 49' (0:2) Scheiwiler; 45' (0:3) Baur	Attendance: 350; Referee: (Switzerland) Kistler (Zürich)

12 April 1979 Exhibition game	Luzern	2–2	Zürich	Stadion Allmend, Luzern
	Kaufmann 57' (1:0); Christen (penalty missed) 82′ Christen 82' (2:2); Reimer (red card) 86'	FCZ summary	(penalty missed) 10′ Botteron; 63' (1:1) Risi; 75' (o.g.) (Meschenmoser)	Attendance: 1,500; Referee: (Switzerland) Jakober (Stans)

17 April 1979 Exhibition game	Zürich	7–0	Blue Stars	Letzigrund, Zürich
	Botteron (1:0); Botteron (2:0); Zwicker (3:0); Zwicker (4:0); Risi (5:0); Risi (6:0); Jerković (7:0)	FCZ summary		Attendance: 500; Referee: (Switzerland) Rudolf Affolter (Bülach)

6 June 1979 Exhibition game	Switzerland	1–1	Zürich	Küsnacht
	Schnyder 38' (1:0)	FCZ summary	63' (1:1) Jerković	Attendance: 2,500; Referee: (Switzerland) Isler (Affoltern am Albis and Zürich)

== Sources and references ==
- dbFCZ Homepage
- Switzerland 1978–79 at RSSSF
- Swiss League Cup at RSSSF

Preceded by 1977–78	FC Zürich seasons	Succeeded by 1979–80
