= 1979 Intertoto Cup =

Tournament details
- Teams: 32

Final positions
- Champions: Group winners Werder Bremen; Grasshopper Club; Eintracht Braunschweig; Bohemians Prague; Spartak Trnava; Zbrojovka Brno; Pirin Blagoevgrad; Baník Ostrava

Tournament statistics
- Matches played: 96

In the 1979 Intertoto Cup no knock-out rounds were contested, and therefore no overall winner was declared. 32 clubs participated in this years edition.

== Group stage ==
The teams were divided into eight groups of four teams each.

=== Group 1 ===
Pos	Team	Pld	W	D	L	GF	GA	GD	Pts	BRE	STA	MNE	RWI
1	(West Germany) Werder Bremen	6	5	1	0	10	4	+6	11	—	3–1	1–0	2–1
2	(Belgium) Standard Liège	6	2	1	3	10	9	+1	5	1–2	—	3–1	3–0
3	(Israel) Maccabi Netanya	6	1	2	3	8	10	−2	4	0–1	1–1	—	4–2
4	(Austria) Rapid Wien	6	1	2	3	8	13	−5	4	1–1	2–1	2–2	—

Source: mogiel.net
Rules for classification: 1) Points; 2) Goal difference; 3) Goals scored; 4) Head-to-head points; 5) Away goals scored; 6) Draw.

=== Group 2 ===
Pos	Team	Pld	W	D	L	GF	GA	GD	Pts	GCZ	VEJ	ANT	DUI
1	(Switzerland) Grasshopper Club	6	3	1	2	9	10	−1	7	—	1–4	2–1	2–2
2	(Denmark) Vejle	6	2	2	2	10	7	+3	6	2–0	—	1–2	1–2
3	(Belgium) Royal Antwerp	6	2	2	2	11	11	0	6	1–2	2–2	—	3–1
4	(West Germany) Duisburg	6	1	3	2	7	9	−2	5	0–1	0–0	2–2	—

Source: mogiel.net
Rules for classification: 1) Points; 2) Goal difference; 3) Goals scored; 4) Head-to-head points; 5) Away goals scored; 6) Draw.

=== Group 3 ===
Pos	Team	Pld	W	D	L	GF	GA	GD	Pts	EIN	MAL	SLA	STG
1	(West Germany) Eintracht Braunschweig	6	4	2	0	15	7	+8	10	—	3–1	2–0	3–2
2	(Sweden) Malmö FF	6	4	1	1	13	9	+4	9	2–2	—	3–1	2–1
3	(Czechoslovakia) Slavia Prague	6	2	1	3	6	9	−3	5	1–1	1–3	—	2–0
4	(Switzerland) St. Gallen	6	0	0	6	5	14	−9	0	1–4	1–2	0–1	—

Source: mogiel.net
Rules for classification: 1) Points; 2) Goal difference; 3) Goals scored; 4) Head-to-head points; 5) Away goals scored; 6) Draw.

=== Group 4 ===
Pos	Team	Pld	W	D	L	GF	GA	GD	Pts	B05	GÖT	ZÜR	OB
1	(Czechoslovakia) Bohemians Prague	6	4	1	1	13	10	+3	9	—	3–2	2–2	4–1
2	(Sweden) IFK Göteborg	6	3	1	2	19	8	+11	7	4–0	—	5–1	6–1
3	(Switzerland) Zürich	6	2	1	3	9	15	−6	5	1–2	1–0	—	4–3
4	(Denmark) Odense	6	1	1	4	10	18	−8	3	0–2	2–2	3–0	—

Source: mogiel.net
Rules for classification: 1) Points; 2) Goal difference; 3) Goals scored; 4) Head-to-head points; 5) Away goals scored; 6) Draw.

30 June 1979
Round 1

Bohemians Prague (Czechoslovakia)	2–2	Zürich
Tichý 19' (1:1); Nemec 53' (2:1)	FCZ summary	12' (0:1) Risi; 87' (2:2) Botteron

Prague
Attendance: 3,000
Referee: (Czechoslovakia) Jaromír Fausek

7 July 1979
Round 2

Zürich	1–0	IFK Göteborg
Seiler 73' (1:0)	FCZ summary	(yellow card) 63' Karlsson

Eschenbach, St. Gallen
Attendance: 1,300
Referee: (Switzerland) Peter Scherz (Aegerten)

14 July 1979
Round 3

Zürich	4–3	(Denmark) Odense
Seiler 5' (1:0); Jerković 14' (2:0); Jerković 26' (3:1); Jerković 77' (4:3)	FCZ summary	23' (pen. 2:1) Eriksen; 41' (3:2) Eriksen; 44' (3:3) Munk Nielsen

Dulliken
Attendance: 2,000
Referee: (Switzerland) Franz Gächter (Suhr, Aargau)

21 July 1979
Round 4

Zürich	1–2	(Czechoslovakia) Bohemians Prague
Zwicker 68' (1:1)	FCZ summary	49' (0:1) Tichý; (yellow card) 72' Roubícek; (yellow card) 81' Panenka; 82' (1:2) Nemec

Allmend, Horgen
Attendance: 3,000
Referee: (Switzerland) Meier

28 July 1979
Round 5

Odense (Denmark)	3–0	Zürich
Eriksen 10' (1:0); Eriksen 28' (2:0); Andersen (yellow card) 54'; Eriksen 67' (3:0)	FCZ summary	(yellow card) 67' Lüdi; (yellow card) 67' Baur

Fionia Park, Odense
Attendance: 1,500
Referee: (Denmark) Sörensen

4 August 1979
Round 6

IFK Göteborg	5–1	Zürich
Holm 10' (pen. 1:0); Holmgren 34' (2:0); Nilsson 38' (3:0); Nilsson 45' (4:0); Holmgren 54' (5:0); Olausson (yellow card)	FCZ summary	75' (5:1) Zwicker; (yellow card) Baur; (yellow card) Chapuisat; (yellow card) Zwicker; (yellow card) Seiler; (yellow card) Zappa

Göteborg
Attendance: 3,289
Referee: (Sweden) Per-Arne Morin

=== Group 5 ===
Pos	Team	Pld	W	D	L	GF	GA	GD	Pts	TRV	ESB	KFF	FIR
1	(Czechoslovakia) Spartak Trnava	6	4	2	0	9	3	+6	10	—	2–2	1–0	3–0
2	(Denmark) Esbjerg	6	3	1	2	12	8	+4	7	0–1	—	4–2	3–1
3	(Sweden) Kalmar	6	2	1	3	9	9	0	5	0–1	2–1	—	3–0
4	(Austria) First Vienna	6	0	2	4	4	14	−10	2	1–1	0–2	2–2	—

Source: mogiel.net
Rules for classification: 1) Points; 2) Goal difference; 3) Goals scored; 4) Head-to-head points; 5) Away goals scored; 6) Draw.

=== Group 6 ===
Pos	Team	Pld	W	D	L	GF	GA	GD	Pts	BRN	SLA	CHÊ	LIN
1	(Czechoslovakia) Zbrojovka Brno	6	5	0	1	19	5	+14	10	—	3–1	3–1	3–0
2	(Bulgaria) Slavia Sofia	6	4	1	1	15	6	+9	9	2–0	—	2–0	4–1
3	(Switzerland) Chênois	6	1	1	4	7	17	−10	3	1–7	2–2	—	3–0
4	(Austria) LASK	6	1	0	5	4	17	−13	2	0–3	0–4	3–0	—

Source: mogiel.net
Rules for classification: 1) Points; 2) Goal difference; 3) Goals scored; 4) Head-to-head points; 5) Away goals scored; 6) Draw.

=== Group 7 ===
Pos	Team	Pld	W	D	L	GF	GA	GD	Pts	PIR	KAT	AGF	SAL
1	(Bulgaria) Pirin Blagoevgrad	6	4	0	2	9	6	+3	8	—	3–0	2–0	2–0
2	(Poland) Katowice	6	2	3	1	5	4	+1	7	FF; Awd 3–0 *	—	1–0	0–0
3	(Denmark) AGF	6	2	2	2	5	5	0	6	2–0	0–0	—	1–0
4	(Austria) Casino Salzburg	6	0	3	3	4	8	−4	3	1–2	1–1	2–2	—

Source: mogiel.net
Rules for classification: 1) Points; 2) Goal difference; 3) Goals scored; 4) Head-to-head points; 5) Away goals scored; 6) Draw.
- Note to the match Katowice–Pirin Blagoevgrad: Pirin Blagoevgrad declaired forfeit and the match was awarded as a 3–0 victory for Katowice.

=== Group 8 ===
Pos	Team	Pld	W	D	L	GF	GA	GD	Pts	OST	ÖST	DAR	GRA
1	(Czechoslovakia) Baník Ostrava	6	4	1	1	14	9	+5	9	—	3–2	1–1	4–2
2	(Sweden) Öster	6	2	3	1	14	8	+6	7	4–0	—	0–0	4–1
3	(West Germany) Darmstadt	6	1	4	1	6	6	0	6	0–3	1–1	—	3–0
4	(Austria) GAK	6	0	2	4	7	18	−11	2	0–3	3–3	1–1	—

Source: mogiel.net
Rules for classification: 1) Points; 2) Goal difference; 3) Goals scored; 4) Head-to-head points; 5) Away goals scored; 6) Draw.

== See also ==
- 1979–80 European Cup
- 1979–80 UEFA Cup Winners' Cup
- 1979–80 UEFA Cup
