= 1979–80 Swiss League Cup =

Tournament details
- Country: Switzerland
- Teams: 32

Final positions
- Champions: Servette
- Runners-up: Grasshopper Club

Tournament statistics
- Matches played: 31

The 1979–80 Swiss League Cup was the eighth edition of the Swiss League Cup competition since its introduction in 1972. The first round was played in summer 1979 as a pre-season warm-up to the 1979–80 Swiss football season, the later rounds were played after the winter-break.

== Overview ==
The League Cup had been created seven seasons earlier to allow clubs from the top two tiers to compete in a tournament in advance of the league season, with the semi-finals and final played in the Autumn. However, this planning had been given up and modified. The idea of a home and away fixture in the first round, as introduced in the previous season, was also rejected. This season the first round was played in advance of the season and the later rounds were played in the second half of the league season.

The matches were played in a single knockout format. In the event of a draw after 90 minutes, the match went into extra time. In the event of a draw at the end of extra time, a penalty shoot-out was to decide which team qualified for the next round. No replays were foreseen.

== First round ==
=== Summary ===
Team 1	Score	Team 2
2 August 1979
FC Renens	1–2	Chênois
4 August 1979
Lausanne-Sport	1–1 (a.e.t.) (4–1 p)	La Chaux-de-Fonds
Servette	1–0	Sion
Young Boys	1–0	Basel
Aarau	4–0	Winterthur
Baden	1–3	FC Bern
Bellinzona	4–4 (a.e.t.) (7–8 p)	Luzern
Fribourg	1–2	Vevey-Sports
Grenchen	2–3	Nordstern Basel
Lugano	2–2 (a.e.t.) (5–4 p)	Chiasso
Frauenfeld	3–1	Kriens
Biel-Bienne	2–1	FC Raron
Xamax	3–0	Wettingen
8 August 1979
Mendrisiostar	1–7	Zürich
FC Lerchenfeld	1–6	Grasshopper Club
14 August 1979
FC Schaffhausen	1–4	St. Gallen

=== Matches ===
4 August 1979

Servette	1–0	Sion
Cucinotta (1:0)	Servette summary

Charmilles Stadium, Geneva

4 August 1979

Young Boys	1–0	Basel
Hußner 44' (1:0); Schönenberger (yellow card) 66'	YB summary FCB summary

Wankdorf Stadium, Bern
Attendance: 3,400
Referee: (Switzerland) René Maire (Geneva)

4 August 1979

Aarau	4–0	Winterthur
Goal	FCA summary

Stadion Brügglifeld, Aarau
Attendance: 1,500
Referee: (Switzerland) Ernst Dörflinger (Grenchen)

8 August 1979

Mendrisiostar	1–7	Zürich
Solcà 48' (1:1); Croci (yellow card) 55'	FCZ summary	35' (0:1) Seiler; 55' (1:2) Zappa; 68' (1:3) Kundert; 70' (1:4) Seiler; 75' (1:5) Seiler; 79' (o.g.) Croci; (penalty missed) 85' (1:7) Elsener

Centro Sportivo Comunale, Mendrisio
Attendance: 1,200
Referee: (Switzerland) Bruno Burgener (Kriens)

== Second round ==
=== Summary ===
Team 1	Score	Team 2
17 February 1980
FC Bern	0–3	Servette
Biel-Bienne	0–5	Young Boys
Frauenfeld	1–2	Grasshopper Club
Lausanne-Sport	3–0	Chênois
Lugano	1–3	Aarau
Xamax	1–0 (a.e.t.)	Vevey-Sports
Zürich	2–1	Nordstern Basel
Luzern	2–1	St. Gallen

=== Matches ===
17 February 1980

FC Bern	0–3	Servette
	Servette summary	(0:1) Barberis (0:2) Matthey (0:3) Dutoit

Stadion Neufeld, Bern

17 February 1980

Biel-Bienne	0–5	Young Boys
	YB summary	35' (0:1) Zwahlen; 61' (0:2) Schmied; 64' (0:3) Zwahlen; 74' (0:4) Brodard; 87' (0:5) Müller

Gurzelen Stadion, Biel/Bienne
Attendance: 900
Referee: (Switzerland) Denis Perrenoud

17 February 1980

Lugano	1–3	Aarau
Goal	FCA summary	Goal

Cornaredo, Lugano
Attendance: 400
Referee: (Switzerland) Morex

17 February 1980

Zürich	2–1	Nordstern Basel
Peterhans 20' (1:0); Jerković 37' (2:0)	FCZ summary	63' (2:1) Zbinden

Letzigrund, Zürich
Attendance: 700
Referee: (Switzerland) Bruno Burgener (Kriens)

== Quarter-finals ==
=== Summary ===
Team 1	Score	Team 2
24 February 1980
Aarau	0–1	Zürich
Lausanne-Sport	1–2	Grasshopper Club
Luzern	2–1	Xamax
Young Boys	0–2	Servette

=== Matches ===
24 February 1980

Aarau	0–1	Zürich
	FCA summary FCZ summary	(yellow card) 50' Elsener; 81' (0:1) Peterhans

Stadion Brügglifeld, Aarau
Attendance: 3,200
Referee: (Switzerland) Ulrich Nyffenegger (Nidau)

24 February 1980

Lausanne-Sport	1–2	Grasshopper Club
Kok 34' (pen. 1:1)	RSSSF summary	22' (0:1) Traber; 41' (1:2) Sulser

Olympique de la Pontaise, Lausanne

24 February 1980

Luzern	2–1	Xamax
Kaufmann 17' (1:1); Fischer 37' (2:1)	RSSSF summary	3' (0:1) Lüthi

Stadion Allmend, Luzern

24 February 1980

Young Boys	0–2	Servette
	YB summary Servette summary	61' (0:1) Cucinotta; 63' (0:2) Radi

Wankdorf Stadium, Bern
Attendance: 1,800
Referee: Jean-Marie Macheret (Rueyres, Switzerland)

== Semi-finals ==
=== Summary ===
Team 1	Score	Team 2
8 April 1980
Grasshopper Club	2–1	Zürich
Servette	6–0	Luzern

=== Matches ===
8 April 1980

Grasshopper Club	2–1	Zürich
Bauer 37' (pen. 1:1); Egli 52' (2:1)	FCZ summary	37' (0:1) Zwicker

Hardturm, Zürich
Attendance: 5,500
Referee: (Switzerland) Jakob Baumann (Schaffhausen)

8 April 1980

Servette	6–0	Luzern
Barberis 37' (1:0); Cacciapaglia 43' (2:0); Radi 62' (3:0); Barberis 64' (4:0); Cucinotta 82' (5:0); Radi 87' (6:0)	Servette summary

Charmilles Stadium, Geneva

== Final ==
The final was held at the Gurzelen Stadion in Biel/Bienne on 6 May 1980.

=== Summary ===
Team 1	Score	Team 2
6 May 1980
Servette	3–0	Grasshopper Club

=== Telegram ===
6 May 1980

Servette	3–0	Grasshopper Club
Cucinotta 12' (1:0); Schnyder 46' (2:0); Barberis 49' (3:0)	Servette summary

Gurzelen Stadion, Biel/Bienne
Attendance: 7,700
Referee: (Switzerland) Werner Bösch

Servette won the cup and this was the club's second consecutive League Cup title.

== Further in Swiss football ==
- 1979–80 Nationalliga A
- 1979–80 Swiss 1. Liga
- 1979–80 Swiss Cup
