= 1979–80 Swiss Cup =

Tournament details
- Country: Switzerland

Final positions
- Champions: Sion
- Runners-up: Young Boys

The 1979–80 Swiss Cup was the 55th season of Switzerland's annual football cup competition.

== Overview ==
The competition began on the weekend 4 and 5 August 1979 with the first games of the first round and was completed on Whit Monday 26 June 1980 with the final, which was held at the former Wankdorf Stadium in Bern. The clubss from this season's Nationalliga B were granted byes for the first round. The games of the second round were played one week later, on the weekend 11 and 12 of August. The clubs from this season's Nationalliga A were granted byes for the first three rounds. These teams joined the competition in the fourth round on 29 and 30 September.

The matches were played in a knockout format. Up until the quarter-finals, in the event of a draw at the end of extra time, the match was decided with a penalty shoot-out. In and after the quarter-finals, a replay was foreseen and this was played on the visiting team's pitch. The winners of the cup qualified themselves for the first round of the Cup Winners' Cup in the next season.

== Round 1 ==
The teams from the lower divisions, who had qualified for this round through their regional football association's cup competitions or their requirements, competed in the first round.

=== Summary ===
Team 1	Score	Team 2
4 and 5 August 1979
FC Onex	0–4	Stade Lausanne
FC Lutry	2–1	Etoile Carouge
Montreux-Sports	3–1	Stade Nyonnais
FC Plan-les-Ouates	0–3	FC Renens
Unistars 77 Aigle	3–1	Monthey
FC Gland	1–3 (a.e.t.)	ES Malley
FC Saint-Prex	1–3	Meyrin
Concordia Lausanne	0–4	Lancy-Sports
FC Siviriez	4–2 (a.e.t.)	FC Orbe
FC Grimisuat	5–1	FC Visp
FC Bagnes	1–4	FC Leytron
Marin-Sports	0–1	Le Locle-Sports
CS Romont	1–2	Bulle
Düdingen	2–5	Central Fribourg
FC Estavayer-le-Lac	1–1 (a.e.t.) (p)	Yverdon-Sport
FC Courfaivre	0–6	Delémont
Moutier	5–0	FC Boudry
FC Langenthal	1–2	US Boncourt
Thun	3–2	FC Lerchenfeld
FC Aarberg	1–2	Dürrenast
Burgdorf	2–0	FC Rapid Ostermundigen
SC Zofingen	0–5	Solothurn
FC Hochdorf	2–3	SC Zug
FC Littau	0–1	Emmenbrücke
FC Wollera	0–2	SC Zug
Cham	1–6	SC Emmen
SV Sissach	3–4	FC Egerkingen
FC Laufenburg	0–3	Laufen
FC Zwingen	4–2	Concordia
FC Brunnen	4–2	US Giubiasco
FC Deitingen	2–4	Muttenz
FC Binningen	1–1 (a.e.t.) (p)	FC Birsfelden
FC Welschenrohr	0–3	FC Allschwil
FC Schaan	3–1	Chur
FC Uznach	2–5	FC Stäfa ZH
FC Berg	2–5 (a.e.t.)	Balzers
FC Adliswil	0–4	FC Rüti ZH
FC Brüttisellen	3–1	Young Fellows
FC Wollishofen	1–2	FC Glattbrugg
FC Kilchberg	0–4	Red Star
FC Töss	5–3	Gossau
FC Schwammendingen	2–0	FC Turicum ZH
FC Embrach	3–5	Schaffhausen
FC Küsnacht ZH	3–0	Unterstrass ZH
FC Claro	1–0	Locarno
Armonia Lugano	1–7	Mendrisiostar
FC Ayent	0–5	Martigny-Sports
SV Lyss	0–0 (a.e.t.) (4–2 p)	Köniz
Lengnau	3–1	FC Aurore Bienne
FC Gränichen	1–7	FC Herzogenbuchsee
SC Schöftland	2–4	SC Derendingen
FC Dottikon	1–5	FC Suhr
FC Amriswil	3–1	Vaduz
US Les Geneveys/Coffr	1–4 (a.e.t.)	Fétigny
Losone Sportiva	1–2 (a.e.t.)	FC Morbio
FC Tössfeld	0–0 (a.e.t.) (0–3 p)	Blue Stars
FC Glarus	1–0	Ibach
Kreuzlingen	2–1	Brühl

== Round 2 ==
The teams from the NLB joined the cup competition in the second round, they were seeded and could not be drawn against each other. Whenever possible, the draw was respecting regionalities and the lower-tier team was granted home advantage.

=== Summary ===
Team 1	Score	Team 2
11 and 12 August 1979
FC Fétigny	0–3	Vevey Sports
FC Suhr	3–3 (a.e.t.) (3–4 p)	Biel-Bienne
Muttenz	1–3	Nordstern
FC Stäfa ZH	1–3	Aarau
FC Morbio	1–2	Bellinzona
Central Fribourg	1–0	FC Raron
FC Lutry	2–3 (a.e.t.)	Fribourg
Burgdorf	0–1 (a.e.t.)	Grenchen
Thun	0–2	Bern
FC Zwingen	3–2 (a.e.t.)	Baden
FC Brüttisellen	2–1	Wettingen
FC Brunnen	1–3	Kriens
Red Star	0–5	Winterthur
Schaan	2–3	Frauenfeld
Martigny-Sports	1–2	FC Renens
Bulle	3–2	Montreux-Sports
Meyrin	1–2 (a.e.t.)	Lausanne-Sport
SC Binningen	0–2	US Boncourt
FC Herzogenbuchsee	1–5 (a.e.t.)	SC Derendingen
FC Allschwil	2–3	Laufen
SC Emmen	0–7	Blue Stars
Solothurn	4–2 (a.e.t.)	SC Zug
Balzers	2–2 (a.e.t.) (4–5 p)	Schaffhausen
FC Glattbrugg	2–2 (a.e.t.) (4–5 p)	FC Rüti ZH
Unistars 77 Aigle	1–5	FC Leytron
FC Grimisuat	1–2 (a.e.t.)	ES Malley
Delémont	5–0	Moutier
Lengnau	1–4	FC Egerkingen
FC Schwammendingen	5–3 (a.e.t.)	FC Zug
FC Claro	0–3	Mendrisiostar
FC Glarus	2–3	Emmenbrücke
FC Siviriez	2–3 (a.e.t.)	FC Le Locle
FC Estavayer-le-Lac	4–0	Lancy-Sports
FC Amriswil	0–2	FC Töss
SV Lyss	1–0 (a.e.t.)	Dürrenast
FC Küsnacht	1–2	Kreuzlingen

=== Matches ===
11 August 1979

FC Stäfa	1–3	Aarau
Goal	FCA summary	Goal

Sportanlage Frohberg, Stäfa
Attendance: 850
Referee: (Switzerland) Otto Isler (Zürich)

== Round 3 ==
=== Summary ===
Team 1	Score	Team 2
18 August 1979
ES Malley	0–1 (a.e.t.)	FC Le Locle
Aarau	4–0	Kriens
Bellinzona	1–3	Winterthur
Grenchen	3–1	Solothurn
Fribourg	3–0	Stade Lausanne
FC Estavayer-le-Lac	2–1	FC Leytron
FC Brüttisellen	1–1 (a.e.t.) (2–4 p)	Mendrisiostar
Bern	(a.e.t.) 4–1	Laufen
Nordstern	3–1	US Boncourt
Bulle	0–3	Vevey Sports
FC Rüti ZH	0–2	Schaffhausen
Biel-Bienne	3–2	SV Lyss
Delémont	3–2	SC Derendingen
19 August 1979
'Blue Stars	2–0	FC Schwammendingen
FC Töss	1–3	Frauenfeld
Kreuzlingen	4–3	Emmenbrücke
FC Renens	3–0	Central Fribourg
FC Zwingen	2–5	FC Egerkingen

=== Matches ===
18 August 1979

Aarau	4–0	Kriens
Goal	FCA summary

Stadion Brügglifeld, Aarau
Attendance: 850
Referee: (Switzerland) Rudolf Affolter

== Round 4 ==
The teams from the NLA joined the cup competition in the fourth round, they were seeded and could not be drawn against each other. The draw was still respecting regionalities and the lower-tier team was granted home advantage.

=== Summary ===
Team 1	Score	Team 2
29 September 1979
FC Le Locle	0–4	Xamax
Aarau	2–4	St. Gallen
Grenchen	1–2	La Chaux-de-Fonds
Fribourg	1–2	Chênois
FC Egerkingen	1–9	Zürich
FC Estavayer-le-Lac	0–1	Young Boys
Blue Stars	2–4 (a.e.t.)	Grasshopper Club
Bern	2–3 (a.e.t.)	Sion
Vevey Sports	2–1 (a.e.t.)	Lausanne-Sport
Frauenfeld	2–0	Schaffhausen
Biel-Bienne	0–3	FC Renens
Delémont	0–1	Servette
30 September 1979
Winterthur	1–0	Lugano
Nordstern	0–2	Luzern
Mendrisiostar	1–3	Basel
Kreuzlingen	1–2	Chiasso

=== Matches ===
29 September 1979

Aarau	2–4	St. Gallen
Goal	FCA summary	Goal

Stadion Brügglifeld, Aarau
Attendance: 5,000
Referee: (Switzerland) Gottlieb Barmettler (Luzern)

29 September 1979

FC Egerkingen	1–9	Zürich
Schwarz 34' (1:2)	FCZ summary	20' (0:1) Botteron; 22' (0:2) Erba; 43' (1:3) Peterhans; 48' (1:4) Peterhans; 50' (1:5) Botteron; 58' (1:6) Zappa; 75' (1:7) Seiler; 84' (1:8) Zwicker; 88' (1:9) Peterhans

Sportplatz Byfang, Egerkingen
Attendance: 5,000
Referee: (Switzerland) Arturo Martino (Neukirch an der Thur)

29 September 1979

FC Estavayer-le-Lac	0–1	Young Boys
	YB summary	82' Müller

Stade des Grèves, Estavayer-le-Lac
Attendance: 3,000
Referee: (Switzerland) René Maire (Genève)

29 September 1979

Delémont	0–1	Servette
	Servette summary	(0:1) Andrey

La Blancherie, Delémont

30 September 1979
15:00

Mendrisiostar	1 – 3	Basel
Roncari (yellow card) 30'; Preisig 59' (1:1)	FCB summary	16' (0:1) Tanner; (yellow card) 41' Maradan; 65' (1:2) Küttel; 81' (1:3) Demarmels

Centro Sportivo Comunale, Mendrisio
Attendance: 1,500
Referee: (Switzerland) Franz Gächter

== Round 5 ==
=== Summary ===
Team 1	Score	Team 2
3 November 1979
Grasshopper Club	3–3 (a.e.t.) (4–5 p)	Sion
Chênois	4–1	Zürich
Chiasso	2–2 (a.e.t.) (2–4 p)	Servette
Xamax	2–1	St. Gallen
4 November 1979
Winterthur	2–1	La Chaux-de-Fonds
Young Boys	2–0	Basel
Luzern	3–0	Vevey Sports
Frauenfeld	1–0	FC Renens

=== Matches ===
3 November 1979

Chênois	4–1	Zürich
Tachet 23' (1:1); Garande 49' (2:1); Garande 74' (3:1); Garande 79' (4:1)	FCZ summary	7' (0:1) Peterhans

Stade des Trois-Chêne, Chêne-Bourg
Attendance: 3,000
Referee: (Switzerland) Jean-Marie Macheret (Rueyres-St-Laurent)

3 November 1979

Chiasso	2–2 (a.e.t.)	Servette
Goal	Servette summary	Barberis; Dutoit
Penalties
Penalty scored Penalty missed	2–4	Penalty scored

Stadio Comunale Riva IV, Chiasso

4 November 1979
14:30

Young Boys	2 – 0	Basel
Müller 29' (1:0); Zwahlen (yellow card) 47'; Schönenberger (yellow card) 52'; Zwahlen 62' (2:0)	YB summery Summary

Wankdorf Stadium, Bern
Attendance: 9,000
Referee: (Switzerland) Peter Rotschi (Oensingen)

== Quarter-finals ==
=== Summary ===
Team 1	Score	Team 2
9 December 1979
Xamax	1–0 (a.e.t.)	Winterthur
Chênois	0–1	Young Boys
Sion	4–1	Luzern
Frauenfeld	0–2	Servette

=== Matches ===
9 December 1979

Chênois	0–1	Young Boys
	YB summary	89' (0:1) Müller

Stade des Trois-Chêne, Chêne-Bourg
Attendance: 4,000
Referee: (Switzerland) Alfred Heinis

9 December 1979

Frauenfeld	0–2	Servette
	Servette summary	(0:1) Barberis (0:2) Barberis

Kleine Allmend, Frauenfeld

== Semi-finals ==
=== Summary ===
Team 1	Score	Team 2
7 April 1980
Sion	2–1	Servette
Xamax	0–1	Young Boys

=== Matches ===
7 April 1980

Sion	2–1	Servette
Brigger 6' (1:0); Cernicky 75' (2:1)	Servette summary	52' (1:1) Bizzini

Stade de Tourbillon, Sion

7 April 1980

Xamax	0–1	Young Boys
	YB summary	56' (0:1) Müller

Stade de la Maladière, Neuchâtel
Referee: (Switzerland) Bruno Galler (Kirchdorf, Bern)

== Final ==
The final was held at the former Wankdorf Stadium in Bern on Whit Monday 1980.

=== Summary ===
Team 1	Score	Team 2
26 May 1980
Sion	2–1	Young Boys

=== Telegram ===
26 May 1980
15:00

Sion	2–1	Young Boys
Balet 8' (1:0); Mathez 62' (2:1)	Fussball-Schweiz summary	10' (1:1) Schönenberger

Wankdorf Stadium, Bern
Attendance: 45,000
Referee: (Switzerland) Otto Isler (Zürich)

Sion won the cup and this was the club's third cup title to this date.

== Further in Swiss football ==
- 1979–80 Nationalliga A
- 1979–80 Swiss 1. Liga

== Sources ==
- Fussball-Schweiz
- Cup 1979–80 at fcb-achiv.ch
- Switzerland 1979–80 at RSSSF

Preceded by 1979–80	Swiss Cup seasons	Succeeded by 1981–82
