= Glenn Holm =

Glenn Holm may refer to:

- Glenn Holm (Swedish footballer) (born 1955)
- Glenn Holm (Norwegian footballer) (born 1969)
