= Geir Johansen (footballer, born 1968) =

Norwegian footballer (born 1968)

Personal information
- Date of birth: 20 April 1968 (age 58)
- Position: Right back

Youth career
- Ekholt
- –1987: Moss

Senior career*
Years	Team	Apps	(Gls)
1988	Moss		
1989–1993	Fredrikstad		
1994–1999	Moss		
- * Club domestic league appearances and goals

Geir Johansen (born 20 April 1968) is a retired Norwegian football defender. Playing as a right back, he is best known for playing three seasons on the first tier for Moss FK; 1996, 1998 and 1999.

== Career ==
Johansen started his career as a youth in Ekholt BK. He joined Moss FK, reigning league champions, ahead of the 1988 season. Having played for their junior team, he struggled to secure a place in the team, but experienced fast development in 1987 under coach Anders Fægri and was deemed ready for the senior team. To complicate matters, Moss FK already had a player named Geir Johansen, who had also been capped for Norway.

As reigning champions, Moss entered the 1988-89 European Cup. Geir Johansen was an unused substitute against Real Madrid. After one year in Moss he went on to Fredrikstad FK together with Glenn Holm. It was announced that Moss exchanged the players for Hans Deunk and Atle Kristoffersen. During the beginning of his Fredrikstad spell, Johansen also carried out his compulsory military service at the time, serving at Rygge Air Force Base. Moss later claimed that Johansen had gone on a two-year loan, which was disputed by Fredrikstad and Ekholt, because Ekholt was entitled to a part of the transfer sum that Moss received. The Football Association ruled that it was a permanent transfer.

In Fredrikstad, Johansen was regarded as a somewhat anonymous, but trustworthy player. Johansen went several years without scoring, before his first goal came in July 1993 against Mercantile. Steady play for Fredrikstad meant that Johansen again gained the attention of Moss FK, which still played on a higher level than Fredrikstad. Johansen took the opportunity to rejoin Moss ahead of the 1994 season.

While playing for Fredrikstad, Johansen attended Halden Teachers' College. After four years there, he graduated in 1994, and was hired as a schoolteacher at Åsvangen school. When Moss won promotion to Eliteserien, Johansen decreased his teacher job by 40% to have better time for training and restitution. From 1999, Johansen was fully professional.

Johansen reached three semi-finals with Moss in the Norwegian Cup; in 1988, 1994 and 1998. Moss lost all three semi-finals; 0–1 against Brann, 0–2 against Lyn and on penalty shootout against Stabæk (Geir Johansen did not play that particular match).

Between 1996 and 1999 he played 87 league matches for Moss, scoring none. By June 1999, he was the only starting player to come from the city of Moss. His playing style was characterized as simple, but effective. However, following a red card in the cup match against Rosenborg (where he also made a foul in the penalty area which the referee thought was a free kick) and a match against Viking in July, he was axed from the team. Manager Knut Thorbjørn Eggen wanted to strengthen Johansen's right back position, and promptly recruited Johan Petter Winsnes. Eggen then told Johansen that he was no longer in the manager's plans and would mostly play for the B team. According to the player, the directors also wanted to renegotiate Johansen's contract, lowering the wages. Johansen refused, but started training with the recruits. As the recruits only trained in the afternoon, Johansen chose to return to his old teaching job on 1 November 1999, which Moss FK looked upon as a breach of contract. The player and club went into legal talks which ended with Johansen's contract being annulled. He was given a certain monetary compensation, but smaller than he thought he was entitled to, since he also claimed he did not subvert the club by teaching. Both the directors and manager Knut Thorbjørn Eggen claimed they were reasonable in negotiating the compensation. Eggen also stated that the players, who supported Geir Johansen, "harassed" the manager and directors. Johansen disagreed. Nonetheless, he retired after the 1999 season.
