= Álvaro López =

Álvaro López may refer to:

- Álvaro López (canoeist) (born 1952), Spanish sprint canoeist
- Álvaro López (Argentine footballer) (born 1998), Argentine forward
- Álvaro López (Chilean footballer) (born 1992)
- Álvaro López (Colombian musician) (born 1958), Colombian accordionist
- Álvaro López (musician, born 1979), drummer from British post trip hop band Second Person
- Álvaro López San Martín (born 1997), Spanish tennis player
- Álvaro López Miera, Cuban military and political leader
- Yaqui López (Álvaro López, born 1951), Mexican boxer
