= Geir Johansen =

Norwegian footballer (born 1960)

Personal information
- Full name: Geir "Bolla" Johansen
- Date of birth: 7 July 1960 (age 66)
- Position: Midfielder

Senior career*
Years	Team	Apps	(Gls)
1975?–1987	Eik-Tønsberg		
1988–1989	Moss		
1990–1993	Eik-Tønsberg		
1994–1995	Ivrig		
1996	Eik-Tønsberg		

International career
1981	Norway u-21	8	(0)
1983	Norway	4	(0)

Managerial career
- 1994–1995: Ivrig (player-manager)
- 1997–1998: Eik-Tønsberg (assistant)
- 1998–: Eik-Tønsberg
- * Club domestic league appearances and goals

Geir "Bolla" Johansen (born 7 July 1960) is a retired Norwegian football midfielder.

== Career ==
As a young player he was on trials with FC Eindhoven and spent a fortnight with Borussia Mönchengladbach. He did not like the prospect of playing and living alone in a foreign country.

He played for Eik-Tønsberg most of the 1980s, but joined Moss FK ahead of the 1988 season. With Moss being the reigning champions, the team contested the 1988–89 European Cup but was knocked out by Real Madrid. In 1990 Johansen rejoined Eik.

Johansen was capped eight times for Norway in 1981, and then four times for Norway in 1983.

Eik was relegated from the 1985 Norwegian First Division. When Johansen was offered a contract by Moss in the closing months of 1987, he was enticed by the prospect of playing in the top tier as well as in European competition. Johansen would commute with the Moss–Horten Ferry. Johansen recorded one assist in his debut match for Moss. To complicate matters somewhat, Moss also drafted a young defender from their junior ranks into their senior squad, whose name was Geir Johansen as well.

Ahead of the 1994 season he went on to minnows IL Ivrig, becoming player-manager for the Fourth Division team. In the winter of 1996 he returned to Eik, appearing in pre-season friendlies. Among others, he scored 5 goals against Tønsberg FK. Ahead of the 1997 season he was offered the positionas assistant manager. He took over as manager in August 1998.

== Playing style ==
He was described as a "petite, light, technically brilliant player". Johansen was also an old school player, did not like stamina training and regularly had the lowest performance among the team members in stamina tests. In line with this, he smoked throughout his playing career. He preferred the ball to be passed directly to his feet, and if it was not, he had a tendency to "protest" by placing his hands on his hips. The direct pass was often used when Johansen lurked inside the penalty area, his back facing the goal, and when he turned around he was often fouled, causing a penalty kick.

== Personal life ==
His nickname was "Bolla" ("The Bun"). He acquired the nickname in his family, as a toddler, because of his round cheeks. When working as a manager, he preferred that his players did not use the nickname.

His favourite English team was Manchester City. A main hobby outside of football was Harness racing.
