= Jean-Claude Richard (footballer) =

French-Swiss footballer and manager (born 1946)

Personal information
- Date of birth: 31 January 1946 (age 80)
- Place of birth: Pierrefontaine-les-Varans, France
- Position: Defender

Senior career*
Years	Team	Apps	(Gls)
1963–1966	Racing Besançon		
1966–1968	FC Le Locle		
1968–1972	FC La Chaux-de-Fonds		
1972–1979	Neuchâtel Xamax		
1979–1984	FC Sion		

Managerial career
- 1994–1995: FC Sion
- 1996: FC Sion (caretaker)
- 1997–1998: FC Sion
- 2009–2011: FC Sion II
- * Club domestic league appearances and goals

Jean-Claude Richard (born 31 January 1946 is a retired French-Swiss football defender and later manager.

== Honours ==
=== Manager ===
FC Sion

- Swiss Cup: 1994–95
