= Álvaro López (Chilean footballer) =

Chilean footballer (born 1992)

Personal information
- Full name: Álvaro Fabián López Ojeda
- Date of birth: September 24, 1992 (age 34)
- Place of birth: Santiago, Chile
- Height: 1.73 m (5 ft 8 in)
- Position: Forward

Youth career
- Cobreloa

Senior career*
Years	Team	Apps	(Gls)
2010–2015	Cobreloa	56	(7)
2015–2016	Barnechea	7	(1)
2016	Deportes Melipilla	8	(1)
2017	Magallanes	20	(0)
2018	Miami United	–	(–)
2019	FAS	9	(1)
2019	RI 3 Corrales		
2022	General Velásquez	13	(4)
2024–2025	Lautaro de Buin	10	(1)
- * Club domestic league appearances and goals as of 24 January 2026

Álvaro Fabián López Ojeda (born 24 September 1992) is a Chilean former footballer who played as a forward.

== Career ==
A product of the Cobreloa youth system, López moved to Calama in 2009 at the age of sixteen, and made his professional debut in 2010 in a match against Unión San Felipe. In 2015, he switched to Barnechea.

After stints with Deportes Melipilla and Magallanes, he moved abroad and played for Miami United in the 2018 NPSL, FAS in the 2019 Clausura of the Salvadoran Primera División and RI 3 Corrales in the Paraguayan División Intermedia.

After a stint as a free agent (2020–21) in the context of the COVID-19 pandemic, he joined General Velásquez in 2022.

In 2024, López joined Lautaro de Buin.

== Personal life ==
After leaving the Paraguayan football at the end of 2019, he started a jewelry shop in Santiago.
