= Mustapha Yaghcha =

Moroccan footballer

Personal information
- Full name: Mustapha Yaghcha
- Date of birth: November 7, 1952 (age 73)
- Place of birth: Morocco
- Height: 1.74 m (5 ft 8 1/2 in)
- Position: Defender

Senior career*
Years	Team	Apps	(Gls)
–	Difaa El Jadida		
1975–1979	CS Chênois		
1980–1983	Servette FC		

International career
1971–1983	Morocco	31	(7)
- * Club domestic league appearances and goals

Mustapha Yaghcha (born 7 November 1952) is a retired Moroccan football defender.

== Career ==
Yaghcha played club football for Difaa El Jadida in the Botola. He also played for CS Chênois and Servette FC in the Swiss Super League.

Yaghcha played for the Morocco national football team at the 1972 Summer Olympics.

In 2006, he was selected by CAF as one of the best 200 African football players of the last 50 years.
