= Mario Preisig =

Swiss footballer (born 1954)

Personal information
- Date of birth: 10 September 1954 (age 72)
- Position: Midfielder

Senior career*
Years	Team	Apps	(Gls)
1973–1986	FC Chiasso		

Managerial career
- 1993: FC Chiasso
- 1994: FC Chiasso
- * Club domestic league appearances and goals

Mario Preisig (born 10 September 1954) is a Swiss retired football midfielder.
