= Jaroslav Němec =

Czech footballer

Personal information
- Date of birth: 6 March 1954 (age 72)
- Place of birth: Czechoslovakia
- Position: Midfielder

Senior career*
Years	Team	Apps	(Gls)
1978–1984	Bohemians 1905		
1984–1986	Slavia Prague	35	(15)

International career
1982–1985	Czechoslovakia	4	(0)
- * Club domestic league appearances and goals

Jaroslav Němec (born 6 March 1954) is a retired Czech footballer who played as a midfielder.

== Honours ==
- 1982–83 Czechoslovak First League
