= Glenn Holm (Norwegian footballer) =

Norwegian footballer (born 1969)

Personal information
- Date of birth: 9 March 1969 (age 57)
- Position: Striker

Youth career
- –1987: Moss

Senior career*
Years	Team	Apps	(Gls)
1988	Moss	13	(0)
1989–1991	Fredrikstad		
1992–1994	Soon		
1995	Sprint-Jeløy		
1996–2007+	Soon		

International career
1989	Norway u-21	1	(0)
1988	Norway	1	(0)
- * Club domestic league appearances and goals

Glenn Holm (born 9 March 1969) is a retired Norwegian football striker.

Hailing from Son, Holm was drafted into Moss FK's senior team from their junior team in 1988. Following unusually good performances in the pre-season friendly matches, he was capped once for Norway in April 1988. At the time he had never played any senior match. Holm featured in over half the games for reigning league champions Moss, but failed to score any league goals. Already in 1989 he went to Fredrikstad FK further down the football pyramid. Struggling with injuries in 1991, he signed for Soon IF after the season. Ahead of the 1995 season he went from Soon to SK Sprint-Jeløy, only to return to Soon in 1996.
