= Walter Fischer (footballer) =

German footballer

Personal information
- Date of birth: 21 February 1889
- Date of death: 3 April 1959 (aged 70)
- Position: Forward

Senior career*
Years	Team	Apps	(Gls)
- Duisburger SpV

International career
1911–1914	Germany	5	(0)
- * Club domestic league appearances and goals

Walter Fischer (21 February 1889 – 3 April 1959) was a German international footballer.
