= Glenn Holm (Swedish footballer) =

Swedish footballer and coach

Personal information
- Date of birth: 24 September 1955 (age 71)
- Place of birth: Landskrona
- Position: Midfielder

Senior career*
Years	Team	Apps	(Gls)
1973–1976	Örebro SK		
1977–1983	IFK Göteborg		
1983	Djurgårdens IF		
1984	Örgryte IS		
1985	Trollhättans IF		

Managerial career
- IFK Göteborg (assistant)
- Västra Frölunda IF
- Skärhamns IK
- Jonsereds IF
- * Club domestic league appearances and goals

Glenn Holm (born 24 September 1955) is a Swedish retired football midfielder and later coach.

== Honours ==
IFK Göteborg

- UEFA Cup: 1981–82
