= Heinz Lüdi =

Swiss footballer (born 1958)

Personal information
- Full name: Heinz Lüdi
- Date of birth: 8 October 1958 (age 68)
- Place of birth: Switzerland
- Height: 1.82 m (6 ft 0 in)
- Position: Defender

Senior career*
Years	Team	Apps	(Gls)
1976–1977	FC Grenchen	?	(?)
1977–1988	FC Zürich	224	(17)
1988–1989	Neuchâtel Xamax	31	(0)
1989–1991	FC Baden	19	(1)

International career^{‡}
1979–1984	Switzerland	42	(1)
- * Club domestic league appearances and goals as of 6 October 2009 ‡ National team caps and goals as of 6 October 2009

Heinz Lüdi (born 8 October 1958) is a retired football defender.

During his club career, Lüdi played for FC Grenchen, FC Zürich, Neuchâtel Xamax and FC Baden. He also represented the Swiss national team.

Lüdi won the Swiss Footballer of the Year in 1981.
