= Walter Seiler =

Swiss footballer (born 1954)

Personal information
- Date of birth: 15 May 1954 (age 72)
- Place of birth: Wettingen, Switzerland
- Position: Forward

Senior career*
Years	Team	Apps	(Gls)
1972–1975	FC Wettingen		
1975–1977	Grasshoppers	40	(21)
1977–1979	Lausanne	58	(17)
1979–1983	FC Zürich	111	(62)
1983–1987	FC Aarau	59	(29)

International career
1976	Switzerland	1	(0)
- * Club domestic league appearances and goals

Walter Seiler (born 15 May 1954) is a retired Swiss footballer who played as a forward.

== Honours ==
- 1980–81 Nationalliga A
- 1984-85 Swiss Cup
