= Stadio Comunale (Chiasso) =

Stadium in Chiasso, Ticino, Switzerland

Stadio Comunale Riva IV
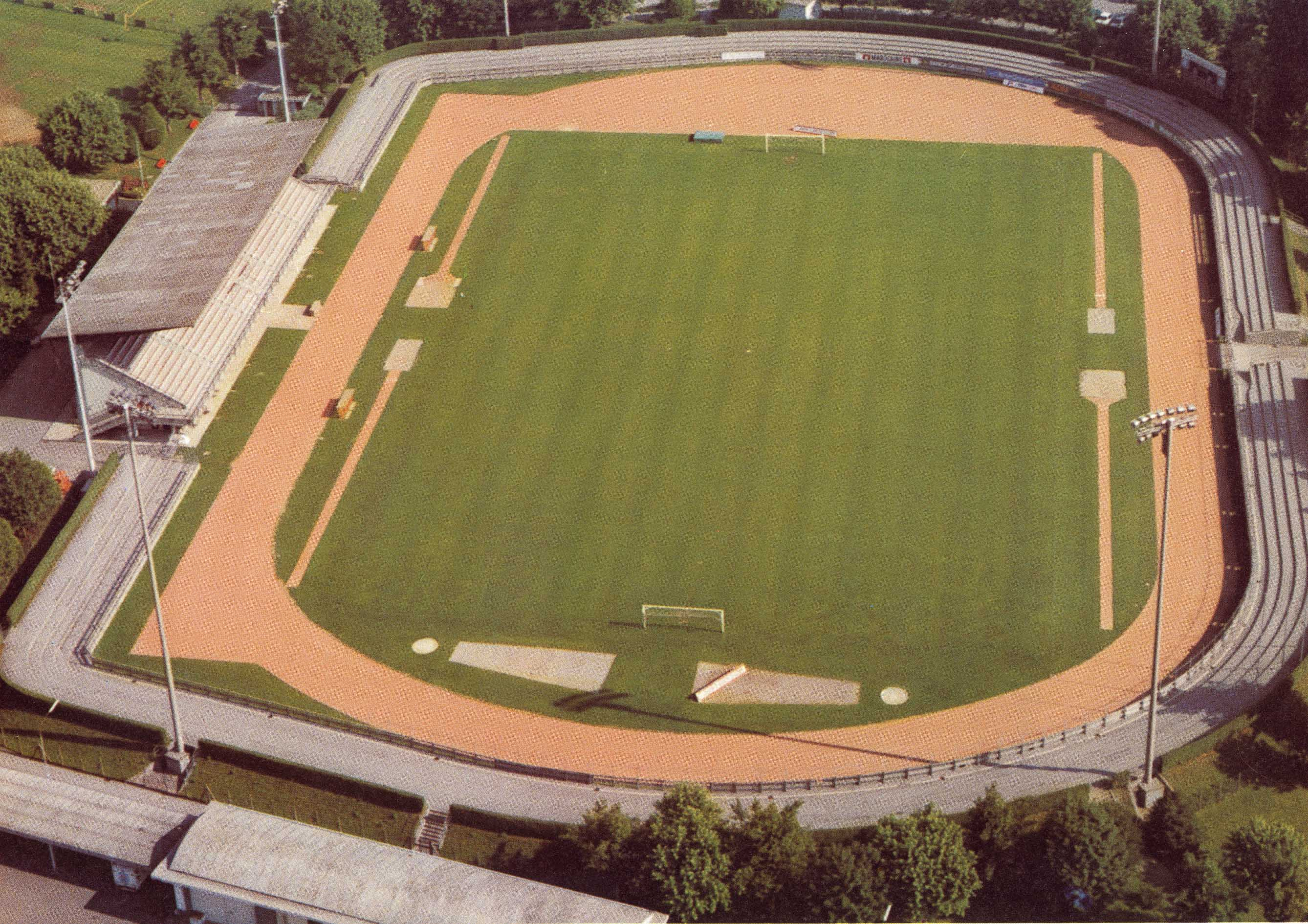
- Interactive map of Stadio Comunale Riva IV
- Location: Chiasso, Ticino, Switzerland
- Coordinates: 45°50′03″N 9°01′00″E
- Owner: Municipality of Chiasso
- Capacity: 4,000
- Field size: 105 m x 68 m

Construction
- Opened: 31 August 1969

Tenant
- FC Chiasso

Stadio Comunale Riva IV is a football stadium in Chiasso, Ticino, Switzerland. It is the home ground of FC Chiasso and has a capacity of 4,000.

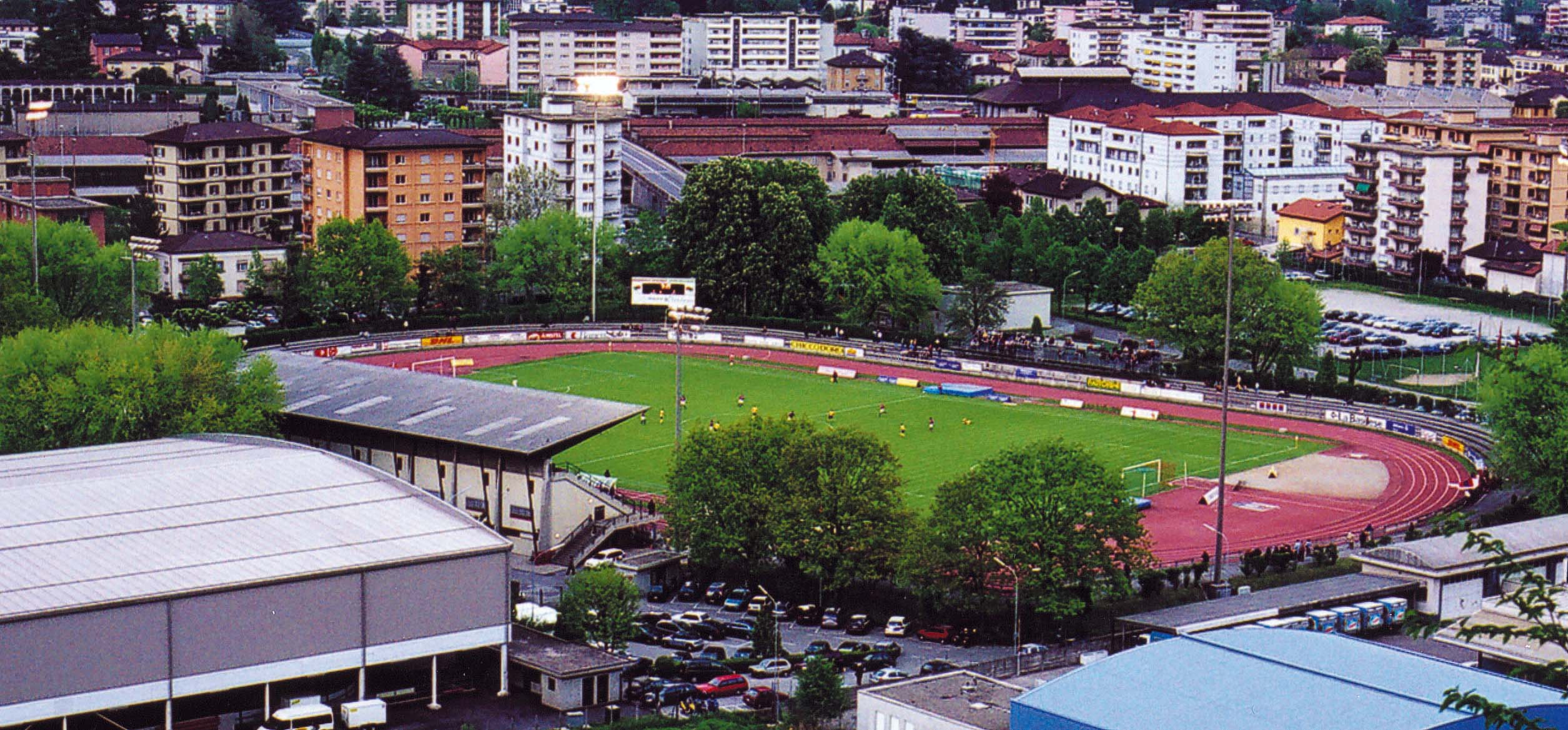

== See also ==
- List of football stadiums in Switzerland
