= André Egli =

Swiss footballer and coach (born 1958)

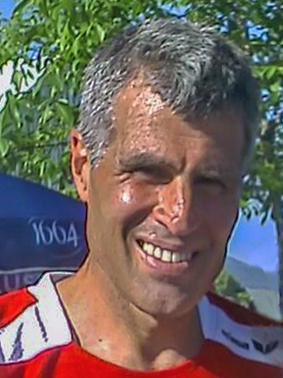
- Egli in 2008

Personal information
- Date of birth: 8 May 1958 (age 68)
- Place of birth: Bäretswil, Switzerland
- Height: 1.83 m (6 ft 0 in)
- Position: Defender

Youth career
- FC Amriswil

Senior career*
Years	Team	Apps	(Gls)
1977–1984	Grasshoppers	177	(54)
1984–1985	Borussia Dortmund	31	(6)
1985–1990	Grasshoppers	159	(28)
1990–1992	Neuchâtel Xamax	52	(3)
1992–1994	Servette	38	(1)
Total		457	(92)

International career
1979–1994	Switzerland	79	(9)

Managerial career
- 1995–1999: FC Thun
- 1999–2001: FC Luzern
- 2001–2002: Waldhof Mannheim
- 2004–2005: FC Aarau
- 2006: SC Zofingen
- 2006: FC Biel-Bienne
- 2006–2007: Busan IPark
- * Club domestic league appearances and goals

André "Andy" Egli (born 8 May 1958) is a Swiss football manager and former player who played as a defender.

== Playing career ==
He was capped 79 times and scored nine goals for the Switzerland national team between 1979 and 1994. He was an unused substitute at the 1994 FIFA World Cup.

== Honours ==
Grasshoppers

- Nationalliga A: 1981–82, 1982–83, 1989–90
- Swiss Cup: 1982–83, 1987–88, 1988–89, 1989–90
- Swiss Super Cup: 1989

Neuchâtel Xamax

- Swiss Super Cup: 1990

Servette

- Nationalliga A: 1993–94
