= CS Chênois =

Swiss football club

- Full name: Club Sportif Chênois
- Founded: 1907; 119 years ago (as FC Thônex)
- Ground: Stade des Trois-Chêne, Thônex
- Capacity: 8,000
- Chairman: Ivano Bisetto
- Manager: David Joye
- League: 1. Liga Classic
- 2024–25: Group 1, 4th of 16
Home colours	Away colours

Club Sportif Chênois is a Swiss association football club based in municipality of Thônex. They currently play in the 1. Liga Classic, the fourth tier of Swiss football.

== History ==
Formed in 1907 as FC Thônex, the club adopted its current name in 1924. The club competed in the Intertoto Cup in 1977 and 1979.

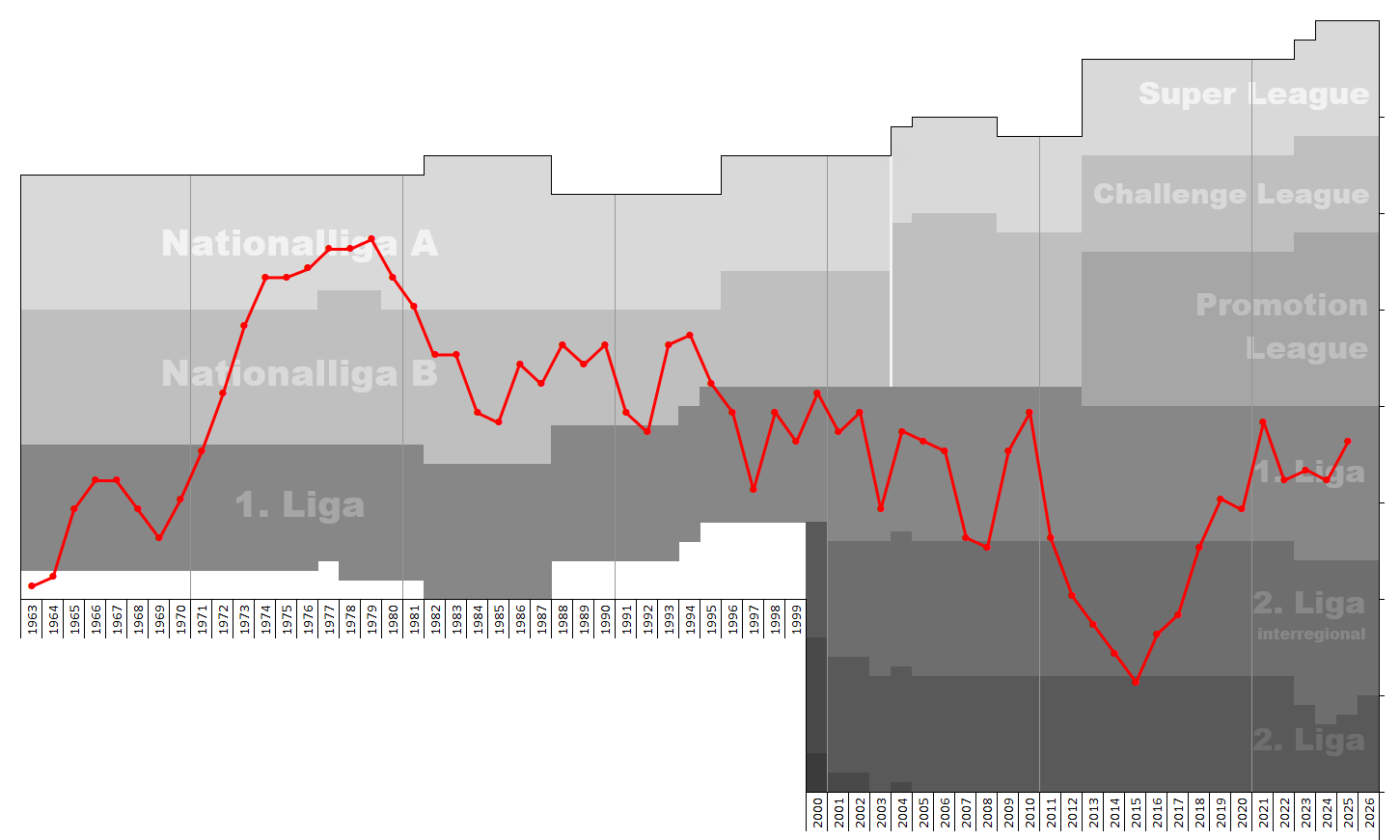
Chart of CS Chenois table positions in the Swiss football league system

== Current squad ==
Note: Flags indicate national team as defined under FIFA eligibility rules; some limited exceptions apply. Players may hold more than one non-FIFA nationality.

No.	Pos.	Nation	Player
1	GK	SUI	Léo Lécureux
2	DF	SUI	Loris Diniz
3	DF	CMR	Dylan Tchamajieu
4	DF	CMR	Joseph Nkodo
5	DF	SUI	Anthony Nwanne
6	MF	FRA	Ilian Moura
7	FW	ITA	Chancelier Ifefo
8	MF	ITA	Kapinga Ntongo
9	FW	SEN	Serigne Ngom
10	FW	SUI	Hajdar Munishi
12	MF	SUI	Gael Batadikio
13	GK	SUI	Elias Jaafri

No.	Pos.	Nation	Player
14	MF	FRA	Camil Belarbi
15	MF	FRA	Rafik Khelil
17	DF	NGA	Sulaimon Ogunleye
18	MF	SUI	Loan Rragamaj
19	DF	SUI	Matteo Zignani
20	MF	FRA	Lucas Billet
21	MF	POR	João Costa
22	MF	FRA	Espedi Kungi
23	GK	SUI	Jules Tomas
25	FW	SUI	Oscar Golaz
26	FW	FRA	Nahil Mahi
