= Gianpietro Zappa =

Swiss footballer (1955-2005)

Gianpetro Zappa
Personal information
- Date of birth: 11 February 1955
- Place of birth: Lausanne, Switzerland
- Date of death: 8 May 2005 (aged 50)
- Height: 1.89 m (6 ft 2 in)
- Position: Sweeper

Senior career*
Years	Team	Apps	(Gls)
1974–1977	FC Lugano		
1977–1984	FC Zürich		
1984–1986	FC Lausanne-Sport		
1986–1988	FC Lugano		

International career
- Switzerland U21
1979–1983	Switzerland	22	(3)

Managerial career
- 1993: FC Chiasso
- * Club domestic league appearances and goals

Gianpetro Zappa (11 February 1955 – 8 May 2005) was a Swiss football defender.
