= Hans-Peter Zwicker =

Swiss footballer (born 1960)

Personal information
- Full name: Hans-Peter Zwicker
- Date of birth: 7 April 1960 (age 66)
- Place of birth: St. Gallen, Switzerland
- Height: 1.72 m (5 ft 8 in)
- Position: Forward

Senior career*
Years	Team	Apps	(Gls)
1976–1977	SC Brühl	?	(?)
1977–1983	FC Zürich	124	(47)
1983–1984	Lausanne	5	(0)
1984–1988	FC St. Gallen	88	(32)
1988–1989	Neuchâtel Xamax FC	22	(4)

International career
1980–1988	Switzerland	25	(1)
- * Club domestic league appearances and goals

Hans-Peter Zwicker (born 7 April 1960) is a retired football striker.

During his club career, Zwicker played for SC Brühl, FC Zürich, Lausanne, FC St. Gallen and Neuchâtel Xamax FC, also representing the Swiss national team.

== Honours ==
Neuchâtel Xamax

- Swiss Super Cup: 1988
