= List of canals in Switzerland =

This is a list of navigable canals that are at least partially located in Switzerland. The canals are listed here in alphabetic order of the name (without generic).

== Currently navigable canals ==
Canal name (English)	Canal name (Local)	From	To
Hurden Ship Canal	Schiffahrtskanal von Hurden	Lake Zürich (lower section)	Lake Zürich (upper section or Obersee)
Interlaken Ship Canal	Interlaken Schiffskanal	Lake Thun near Interlaken	Interlaken West railway station
Nidau-Büren Canal	Nidau-Büren-Kanal / Canal de Nidau-Büren	Lake Biel near Nidau	Aar River near Büren
Thun Ship Canal	Thun Schiffskanal	Lake Thun near Thun	Thun railway station

== Formerly navigable canals ==
Canal name (English)	Canal name (Local)	From	To
Entreroches Canal	Canal d'Entreroches	Yverdon-les-Bains	Cossonay

== See also ==
- Transport in Switzerland
- List of rivers of Switzerland
