= MGN =

MGN can refer to:

- Marine Guidance Notes, by UK Maritime and Coastguard Agency
- National Rail station code for Marston Green railway station, UK
- Mirror Group Newspapers, UK, now part of Trinity Mirror
- Medial geniculate nucleus, a subnucleus of the thalamus in the brain
- Membranous glomerulonephritis, a kidney disease
- Former UK Midland and Great Northern Joint Railway
- Mouettes Genevoises Navigation, public transportation by boat in Geneva, Switzerland
