= Transport in Switzerland =

The Swiss railway network (as of 2017)

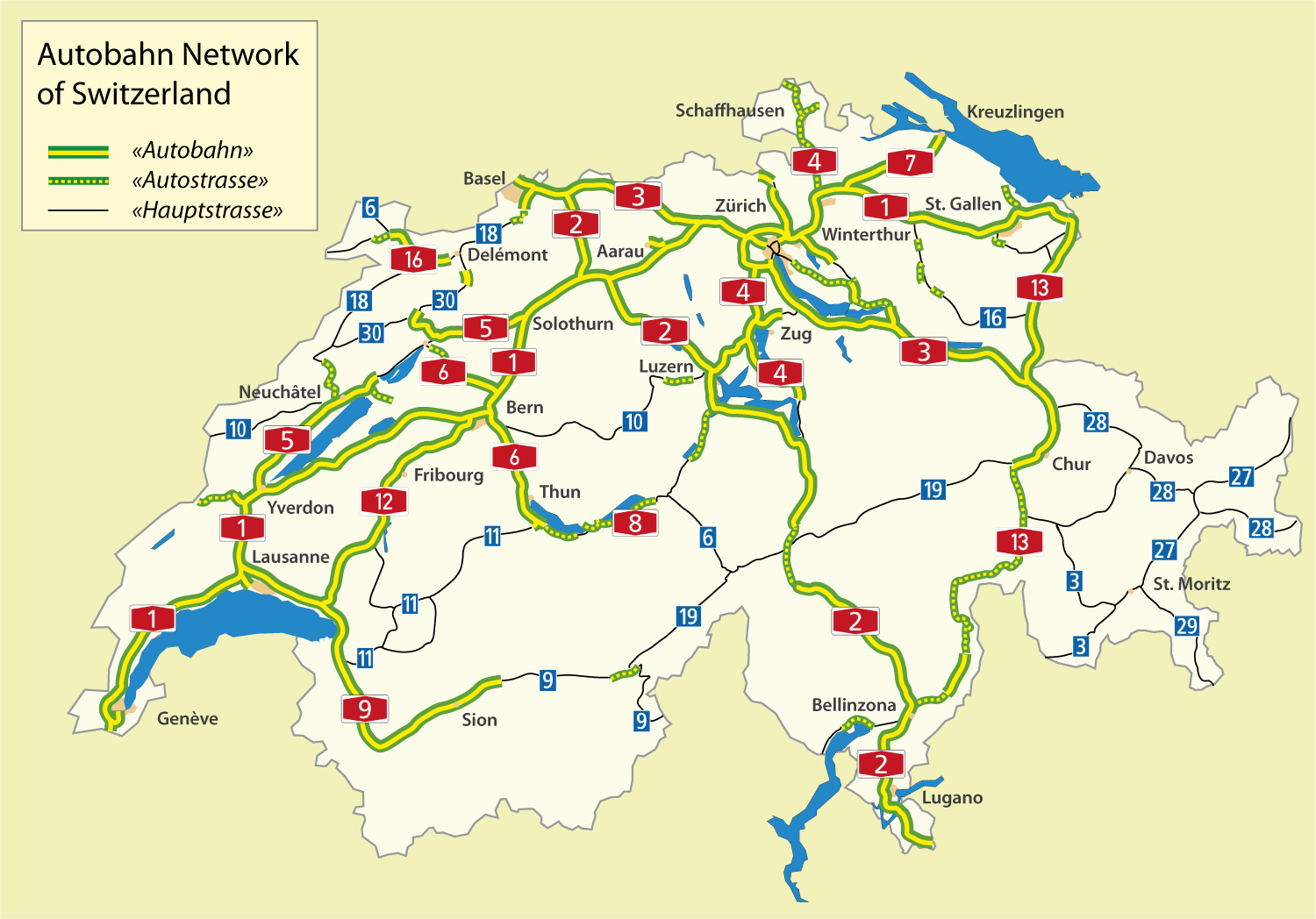
The Swiss road network (as of 2011)

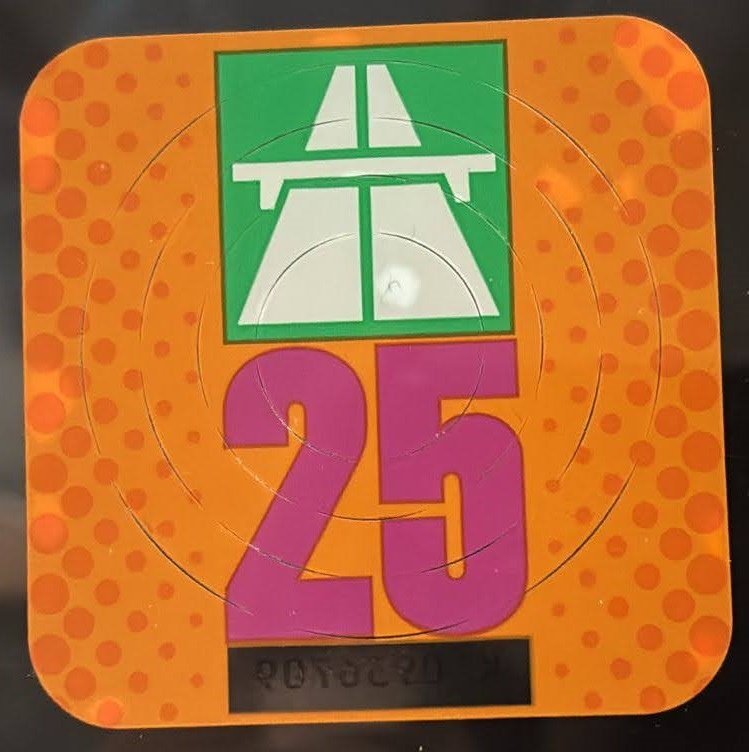
Swiss Vignet 2025

Switzerland has a dense network of roads and railways. The Swiss public transport network has a total length of 24,500 kilometres (15,200 mi) and has more than 2,600 stations and stops.

The crossing of the Alps is an important route for European transportation, as the Alps separate Northern Europe from Southern Europe. Alpine railway routes began in 1882 with the Gotthard Railway, with its central Gotthard Rail Tunnel, followed in 1906 by the Simplon Tunnel and the Lötschberg Tunnel in 1913. As part of the New Railway Link through the Alps (NRLA) in 2007, the Lötschberg Base Tunnel opened, followed by the Gotthard Base Tunnel opened in 2016.

The Swiss road network is funded by road tolls and vehicle taxes. Private cars and commercial trucks must purchase a vignette to use the motorways; this costs 40 Swiss francs per calendar year. As of 2000, the Swiss motorway network has a total length of 1,638 kilometres (1,018 mi) and has also—with an area of 41,290 km^{2} (15,940 sq mi)—one of the highest motorway densities in the world.

Zurich Airport is Switzerland's largest international flight gateway, handling 24.9 million passengers in 2013. The second-largest airport, Geneva Cointrin, handled 14.4 million passengers (2013) and the third-largest EuroAirport Basel Mulhouse Freiburg 6.5 million passengers; both airports are shared with France.

Switzerland has approved billions of francs for the improvement of its public-transportation infrastructure. The modal split for public transportation is one of the highest in Europe, standing at 21.3% in 2010. In many cities with a population above 100,000, the modal split for public transportation lies above 50%.

== Public transport ==
Switzerland has an extensive and reliable public transport network (see e.g. public transport in Zurich). Due to the clock-face schedule, the different modes of transports are well integrated. There is a national integrated ticketing system for public transport which is organised in tariff networks (for all train and bus services and some boat lines, cable cars and funiculars). For non-Swiss tourists, travelling by train, bus and boat in the country is facilitated with the Swiss Travel Pass. Eurail and Interrail rail passes are both valid in Switzerland.

Many Swiss railway stations have bicycle parking (or a bicycle-parking station) and park and ride, known as P+Rail, and many of them also offer Mobility Carsharing.

== Railways ==
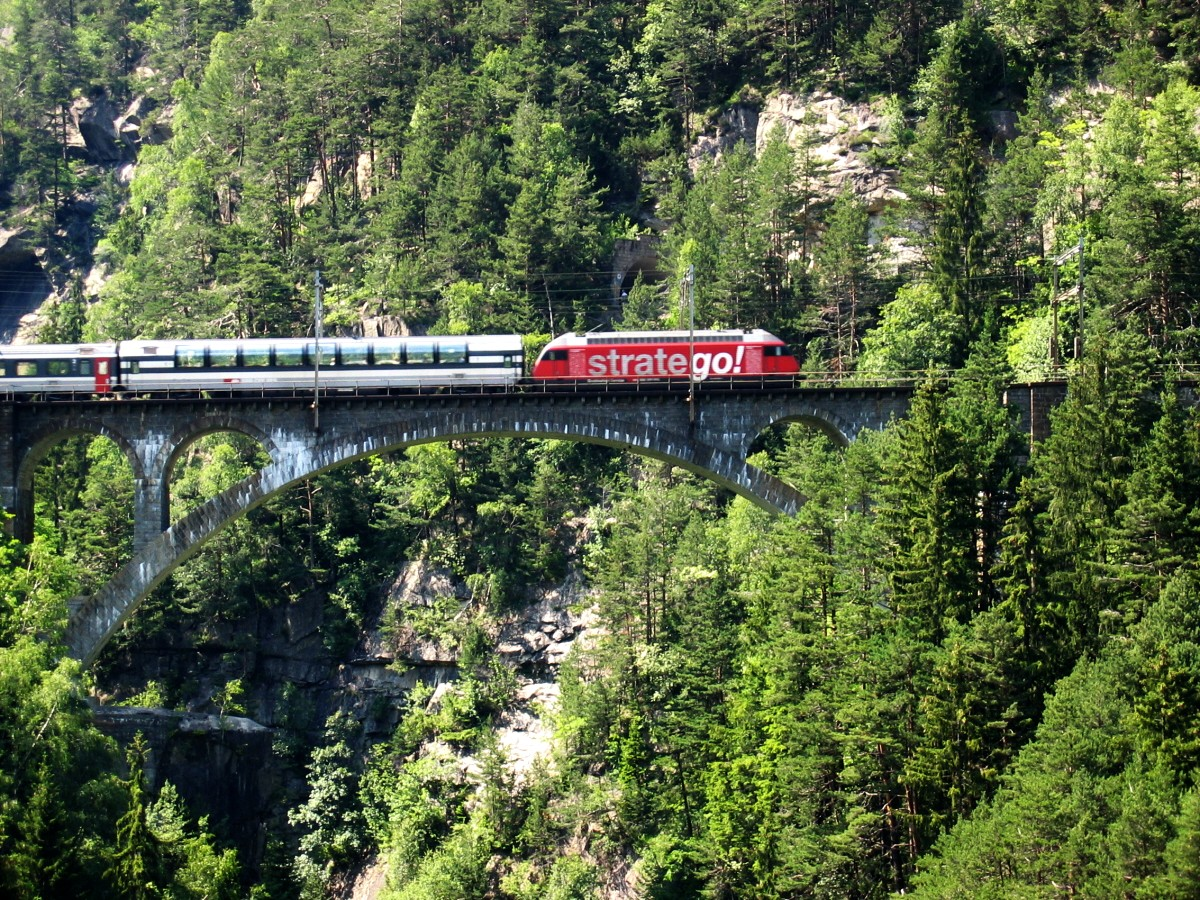
Intercity on the Gotthard line

Switzerland has a very high density of railway network, with an average of 122 kilometres (76 mi) of track for every 1,000 km^{2} (76 mi per 390 sq mi; average of 46 km (29 mi) in the EU). In 2008, each Swiss citizen travelled, on average, 2,422 km (1,505 mi) by rail, which makes them the most frequent users of rail transport. There are only a few high-speed railway lines.

Many of the Swiss standard-gauge railway lines are part of the nationwide Swiss Federal Railways (SBB) system, although other standard gauge lines are operated by independent companies such as BLS AG or Südostbahn. In addition numerous narrow-gauge railways are operated, the largest company of its kind being the Rhaetian Railway. In total, 5,100 km (3,200 mi) of rail network are used.

Swiss Federal Railways run some 5,000 passenger train services covering about 274,000 kilometres (170,000 mi) daily. Half of these train services are long-distance; the other half are regional and suburban services. In 2013, 366 million passengers used the Swiss Federal Railways.

Rail transport in Switzerland also includes a car and truck transportation service (German: Autoverlad) on some lines.

=== Urban rail ===
Urban commuter rail networks, known mostly as S-Bahn, are focused on the country's cities: Zurich, Geneva, Basel, Bern, Fribourg, Lausanne, Lucerne, Porrentruy, St. Gallen, Schaffhausen and Chur. Aargau S-Bahn provides regional train services mainly in the canton of Aargau, transN in the canton of Neuchâtel, RegionAlps in the canton of Valais and TILO in the canton of Tessin and the Italian province of Lombardy. Some services near Lake Constance (Bodensee) also operate for Bodensee S-Bahn.

Several cities, such as Basel, Bern and Zurich, have a tram network. During the mid 20th century, some cities (such as Lugano and Winterthur) replaced their tram lines with trolleybus lines.

Lausanne is the only city with a metro system (Lausanne Metro), which includes two lines: one is light rail; the other, a fully automated metro, opened in 2008. After its opening, Lausanne replaced Rennes as the smallest city in the world to have a full metro system.

=== Mountain rail ===
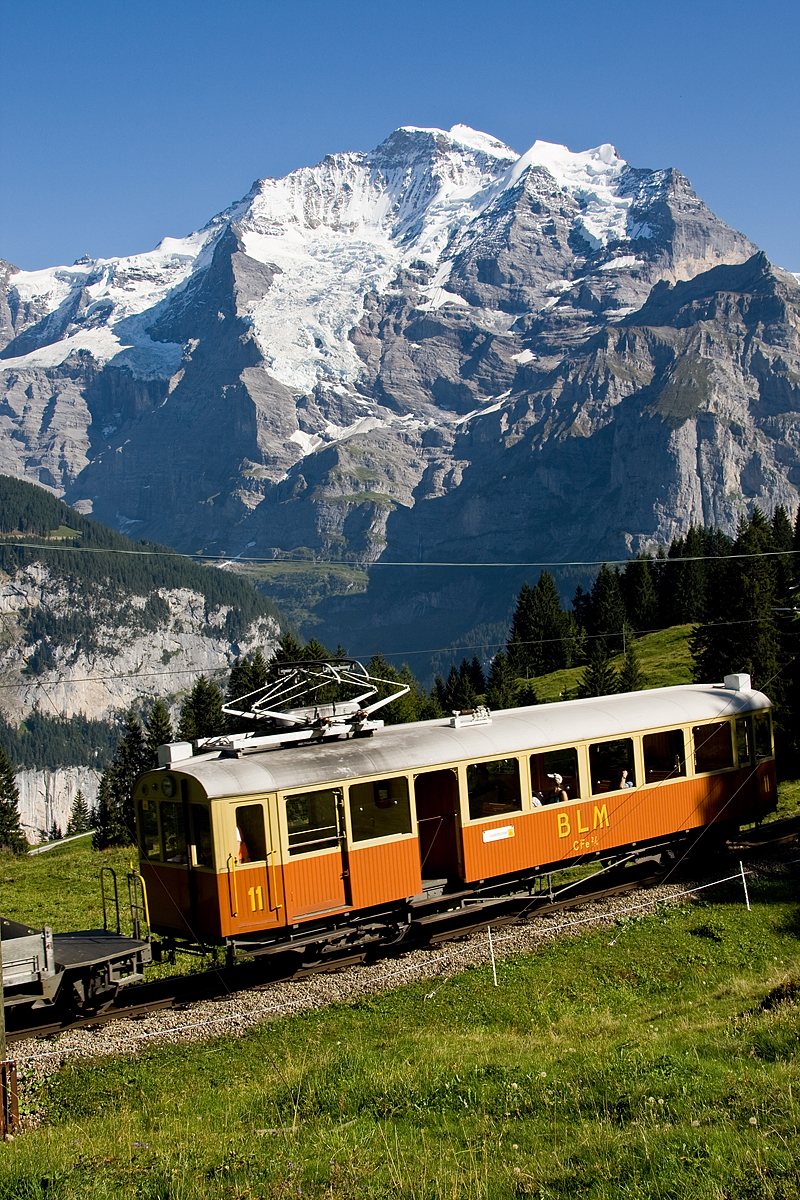
Mürren train

Trains cannot climb steep gradients, so it is necessary to build large amounts of track in order to gain height gradually. Transversals through the Alps were made possible with the use of hidden circular tunnels, which are called spiral railways. In the case of extremely mountainous terrain, railway engineers opted for the more economical narrow-gauge construction.

The many railway viaducts of the Rhaetian Railway in the canton of Graubünden, built for the most part in the early 20th century, have become a tourist attraction as well as a necessary transport system, drawing rail enthusiasts from all over the world.

Some railways were built only for tourist purposes as the Gornergrat or the Jungfraujoch, Europe's highest station in the Bernese Oberland, at an altitude of 3,454 metres (11,330 ft).

=== Proposed Maglev ===
In response to the increasing need for transport capacity and the cost of ground surface infrastructures, an underground transportation system has been proposed and studied. The trains would use linear motor and magnetic levitation to reach speeds about 500 km/h (310 mph). The project is not likely to be realised in the near future, but a license for application has been deposited for a trial line between Geneva and Lausanne.

== Roads ==
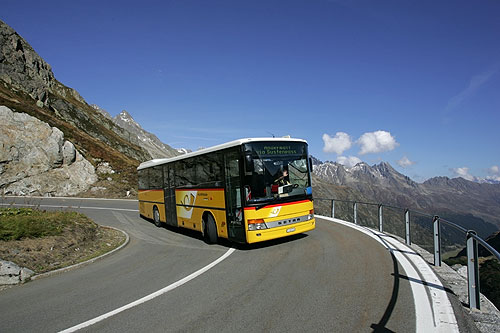
Postauto on the Susten road

Switzerland has a network of two-lane national roads. These roads usually lack a median or central reservation. Some stretches are controlled-access, in that all traffic must enter and exit through ramps and must cross using grade separations.

Two of the important motorways are the A1, running from St. Margrethen in northeastern Switzerland's canton of St. Gallen through to Geneva in southwestern Switzerland, and the A2, running from Basel in northwestern Switzerland to Chiasso in southern Switzerland's canton of Ticino, using the Gotthard Road Tunnel.

Autobahn (plural: Autobahnen) is the German name; in French-speaking Switzerland they are known as autoroutes, and in Italian-speaking Switzerland they are known as autostrade (singular: autostrada). Swiss motorways have general speed limits of 120 km/h (75 mph).

Length of the national, cantonal and municipal road network (2007)
Total	National roads	Cantonal roads	Municipal roads
71,345.6 km 44,332.1 mi	1,763.6 km 1,095.9 mi	18,136 km 11,269 mi	51,446 km 31,967 mi

=== Cars ===
Switzerland had 6,562,600 motor vehicles (excluding mopeds) in 2025. The largest category was passenger cars with 4,829,500 units (58.7% running on petrol, 24% on diesel, 5.2% on electricity and 11.9% hybrid).

=== Road passenger transport ===
Local bus services cover the whole country. Postauto cover the smaller urban areas and every region not connected to the rail network.

Switzerland also has a well-developed network of car sharing organised by the Mobility Carsharing cooperative.

Taxi services are also a common and convenient option for travelers looking for a quick and straightforward way to reach their hotels, corporate meetings, or other locations in Switzerland.

Another type of passenger transport service is airport transfers. They often utilize luxurious vehicles equipped with amenities. These services encompass the provision of transportation from the airport to various destinations, such as hotels, business meetings, headquarters of international organizations, or tourist attractions. Whether for business or leisure, airport transfers offer a transition between flights and final destinations, making them an essential component of modern travel.

== Biking ==
Cycling is included and promoted in the Swiss constitution since 2018. Concretely, the authorities must develop bike-lanes and related infrastructures.

The Asian trend of bike sharing came to Switzerland in 2017 with new companies emerging such as Lime, PubliBike and Smide. The Singaporean-based, former company oBike launched in the city of Zürich on 5 July 2017.

As of 2024, nearly one in two bikes sold in Switzerland was an ebike (Switzerland has 5.2 million bicycles and around 1.4 million e-bikes).

== Air transport ==
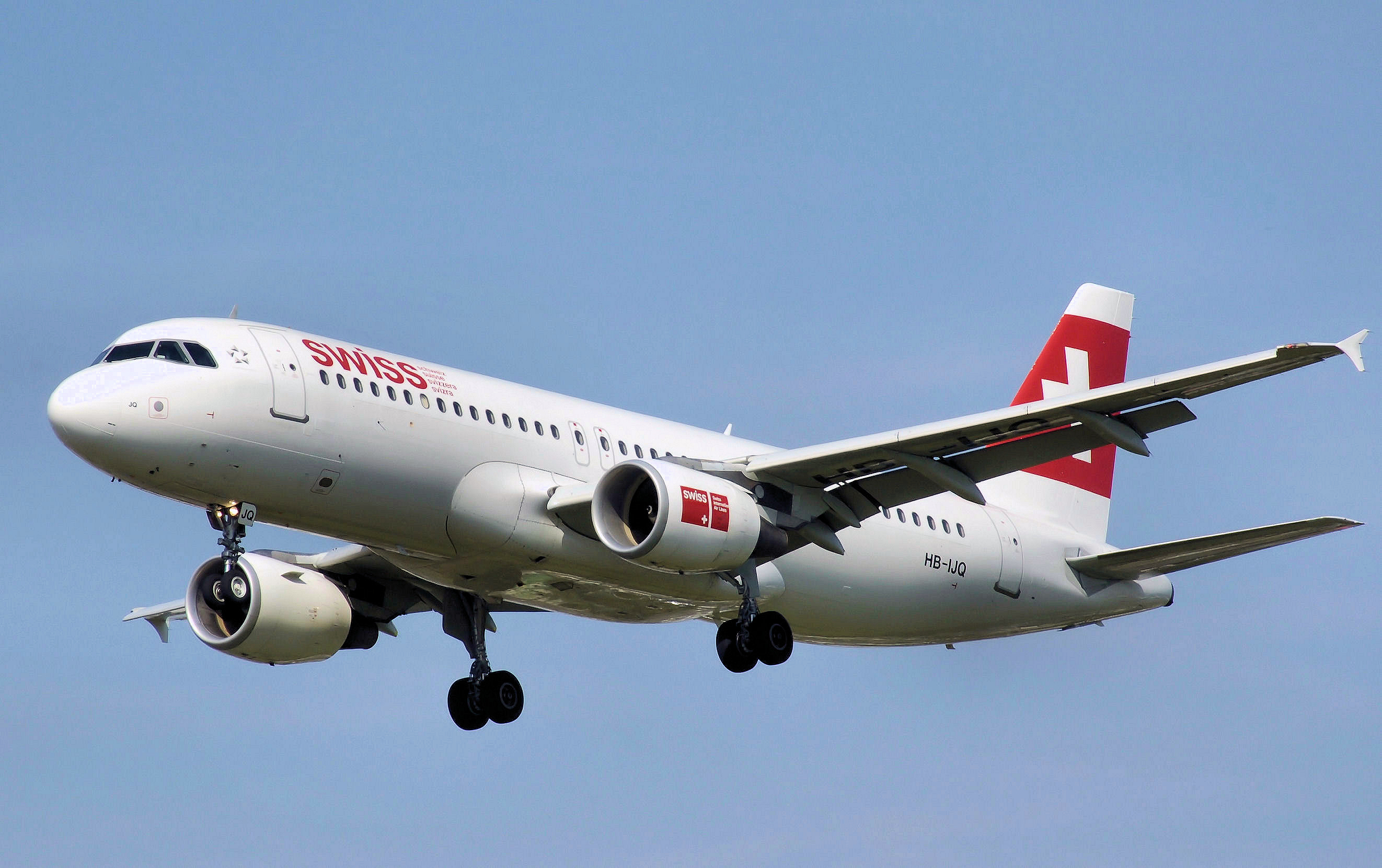
Airbus A320-200 of the national carrier - Swiss International Air Lines

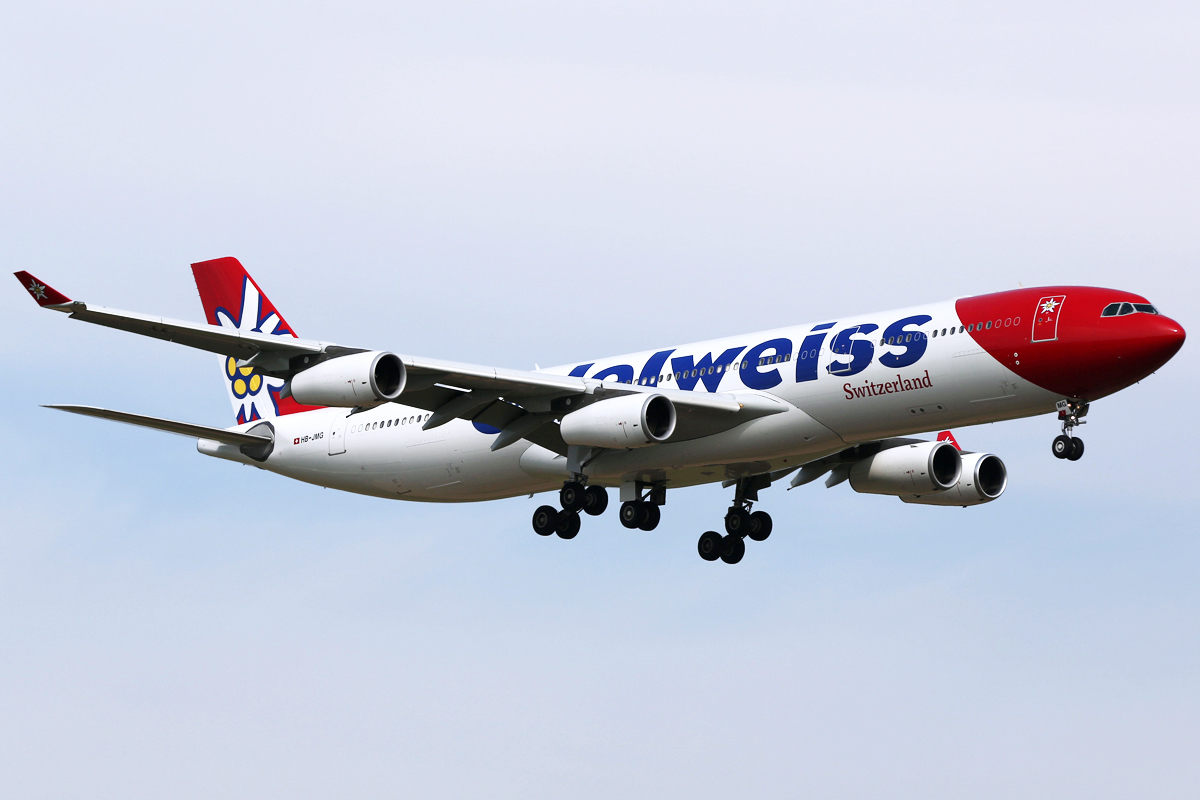
Airbus A340-300 of Edelweiss Air

- 64 (2012)
- Airports - with paved runways
  - total: 41
  - over 3,047 m (10,000 ft): 3
    - Zurich Airport
    - Geneva Airport
    - EuroAirport Basel Mulhouse Freiburg
  - 2,438 to 3,047 m (8,000 to 10,000 ft): 2
  - 1,524 to 2,437 m (5,000 to 8,000 ft): 13
  - 914 to 1,523 m (3,000 to 5,000 ft): 6
    - Bern Airport
    - Lugano Airport
    - St. Gallen Airport
  - under 914 m (3,000 ft): 17 (2012)
- Airports - with unpaved runways:
  - total: 23
  - under 914 m (3,000 ft): 23 (2012)
- Heliports: 1

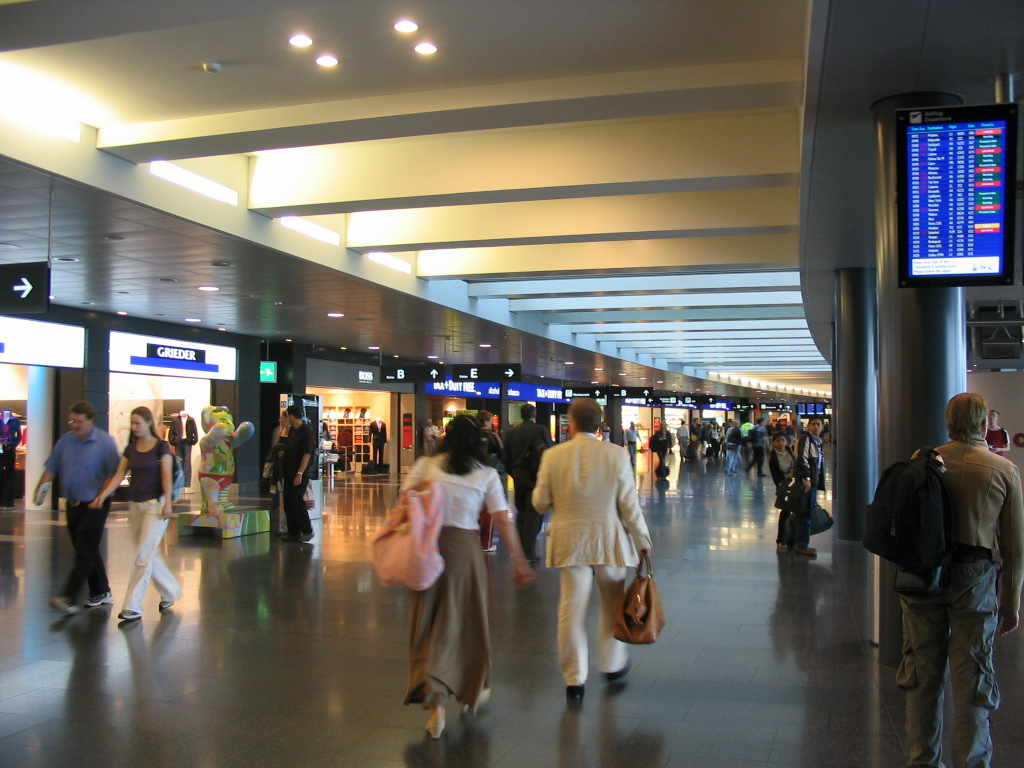
Interior of Zurich Airport

Zurich Airport (IATA: ZRH, ICAO: LSZH) also called Kloten Airport, located in Kloten, canton of Zürich, is Switzerland's largest international flight gateway and hub to Swiss International Air Lines and Lufthansa. The airport handled 27.6 million passengers in 2016. In 2003, Zurich International completed an expansion project in which it built a car park, a midfield terminal, and an automated underground train to move passengers between the existing terminal complex and the new terminal. Zurich International lost traffic when Swissair shut down its operations (most of its assets were then taken over by the former Crossair). When Lufthansa took over its successor Swiss International Air Lines (SWISS), traffic grew again.

Zurich Airport's railway station (Zürich Flughafen) is underneath the terminal. There are trains to many parts of Switzerland; frequent S-Bahn services, plus direct Inter-regio and intercity services to Winterthur, Bern, Basel and Lucerne (Luzern). By changing trains at Zürich Hauptbahnhof most other places in Switzerland can be reached in a few hours.

The second largest airport of the country, Geneva Airport (IATA: GVA, ICAO: LSGG), handled 16.5 million passengers in 2016. The airport has a single runway, the longest of its kind in Switzerland at 3,900 metres (12,800 ft), built in 1960. The runway could only be built after an agreement was reached with France to exchange a piece of territory since it wouldn't otherwise fit entirely in Switzerland. In compensation, the airport has a French sector in its terminals, and therefore flights incoming/outgoing from/to France are considered domestic and a segregated road leads to the airport from France without crossing the Swiss customs.

A turnaround occurred in 1996 when Swissair decided to abandon all the intercontinental routes departing from Geneva except for New York and Washington (that is, all its African destinations). The airport then requested the Swiss Federal Government to implement an open skies policy for Geneva and abolish the legal monopoly enjoyed by Swissair. Following the open skies policy, Geneva Airport now serves over 110 direct destinations from more than 55 airlines. It is the main hub for easyJet Switzerland and a focus airport for Swiss International Air Lines, as well as home to the executive office of IATA.

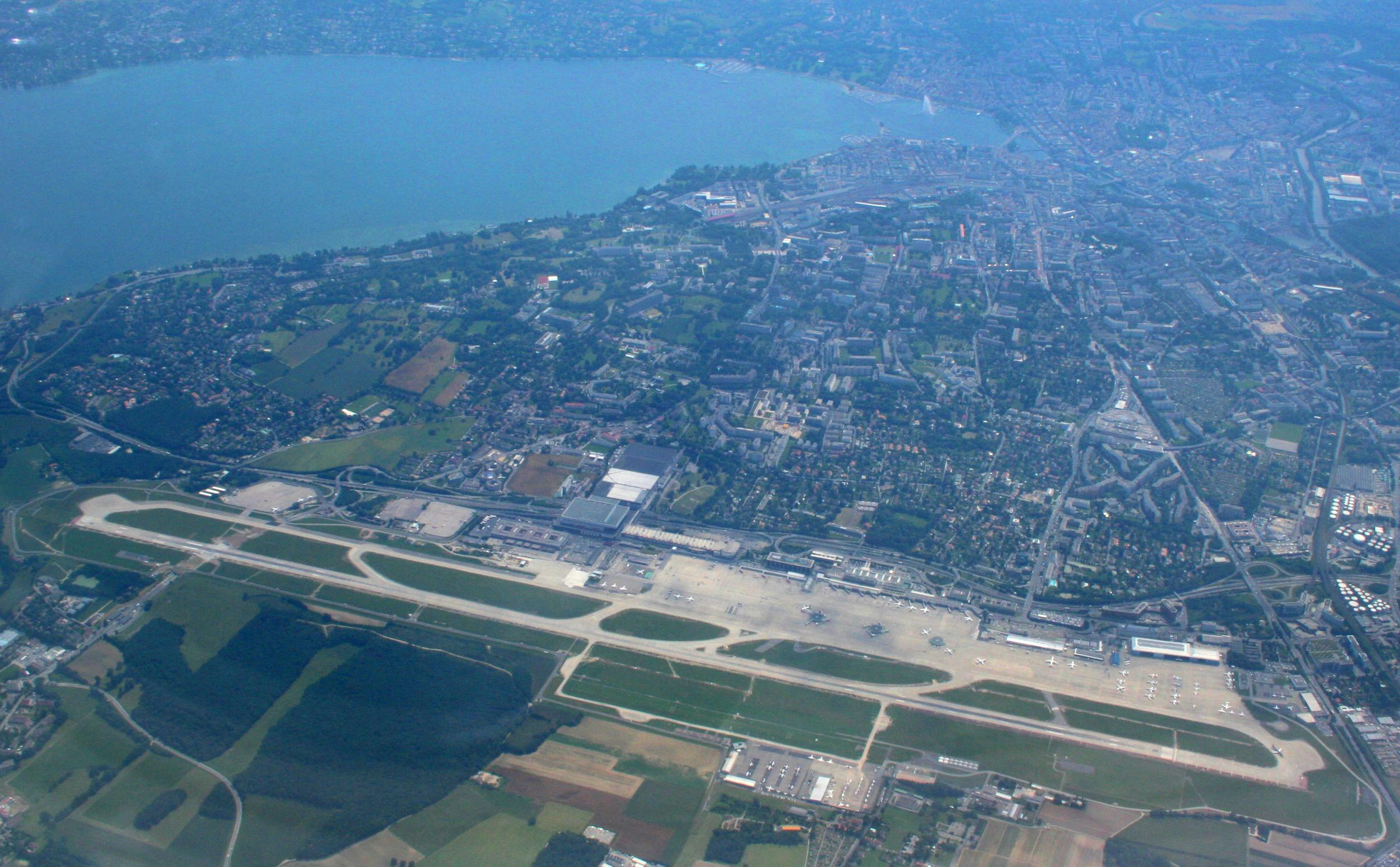
Aerial view of Geneva Airport

Road access to the airport is provided by highways: It is directly connected to the rest of Switzerland by the A1 highway and France via the A40. It has its own railway station, Geneva Airport railway station, from the Swiss Federal Railways (CFF) located right besides the main terminal with trains regularly departing to the rest of Switzerland, towards Neuchâtel, Lausanne-Fribourg-Bern-Zürich, and Lausanne-Vevey-Montreux-Sion-Brig and stopping in all cases in Geneva main train station located in the city centre, which lies only 7 minutes away from the airport by train. Geneva train station is also connected via HSR to France, and to the Léman Express rail network. The airport is also served by several Genevan public transport lines such as trolleybus line 10.

The third largest Swiss airport is EuroAirport Basel Mulhouse Freiburg which handled 7.3 million passengers in 2016 and is located entirely on French territory.

In addition, Sion Airport is a small airport in Sion (Valais) and St. Gallen–Altenrhein Airport near Lake Constance.

== Water transport ==
=== Inland waterways ===
- 65 km (40 mi); High Rhine: between Basel and Rheinfelden and between Schaffhausen and Lake Constance (German: Bodensee)
- 12 navigable lakes
- The Interlaken Ship Canal
- The Nidau-Büren Canal
- The Thun Ship Canal
- The Hurden Ship Canal

=== Ports and harbours ===
Switzerland is a landlocked country and has only small ports on its rivers, such as the Port of Basel. There are also ports on larger lakes, such as Lake Constance (e.g. Romanshorn. Rorschach; the latter two were historically used by train ferries).

=== Merchant marine ===
- total: 38 ships (1,000 GT or over) 597,049 GT/1,051,380 tonnes deadweight (DWT)
- ships by type: bulk 19, cargo 9, chemical tanker 5, container 4, petroleum tanker 1

=== Ship lines on lakes and rivers ===
- Compagnie Générale de Navigation sur le lac Léman and Mouettes Genevoises Navigation (a water taxi) on Lake Geneva (Lac Léman)
- Zürichsee-Schifffahrtsgesellschaft on Lake Zurich (Zürichsee) and the Limmat
- Lake Lucerne Navigation Company on Lake Lucerne (Vierwaldstättersee)
- Schiffsbetrieb Walensee on Lake Walen (Walensee)
- Schweizerische Schifffahrtsgesellschaft Untersee und Rhein on Lower Lake Constance (Untersee) and the High Rhine
- Società Navigazione del Lago di Lugano on Lake Lugano (Lago di Lugano or Lago di Ceresio)
- Gestione Governativa Navigazione Laghi on Lake Maggiore (Lago Maggiore)

=== Car ferries ===
- Beckenried-Gersau ferry across Lake Lucerne (Vierwaldstättersee)
- Horgen-Meilen car ferry across Lake Zurich (Zürichsee)
- Romanshorn–Friedrichshafen (Germany) car ferry across Lake Constance (Bodensee)

== Pipelines ==
In 2010, Switzerland had 1,681 kilometres (1,045 mi) of natural gas pipelines, 95 kilometres (59 mi) of crude oil pipelines, and 7 kilometres (4.3 mi) of refined product pipelines.

== Oversight ==
The Swiss transport system is overseen by several offices within the Federal Department of Environment, Transport, Energy and Communications. The principal such offices are the:

- Federal Office for Civil Aviation, which is responsible for civil aviation.
- Federal Office of Transport, which is responsible for public and freight transport, covering rail transport, cableways, ships, trams and buses.
- Federal Roads Authority, which is responsible for roads.

== Transport in adjacent countries ==
- Austria
- France
- Germany
- Italy
- Liechtenstein

== See also ==
- NRLA
- List of mountain passes in Switzerland
- List of mountains of Switzerland accessible by public transport
- Vehicle registration plates of Switzerland
- Swiss Transport Museum
- List of Swiss tariff networks
