= Mormont =

Mountain in Switzerland

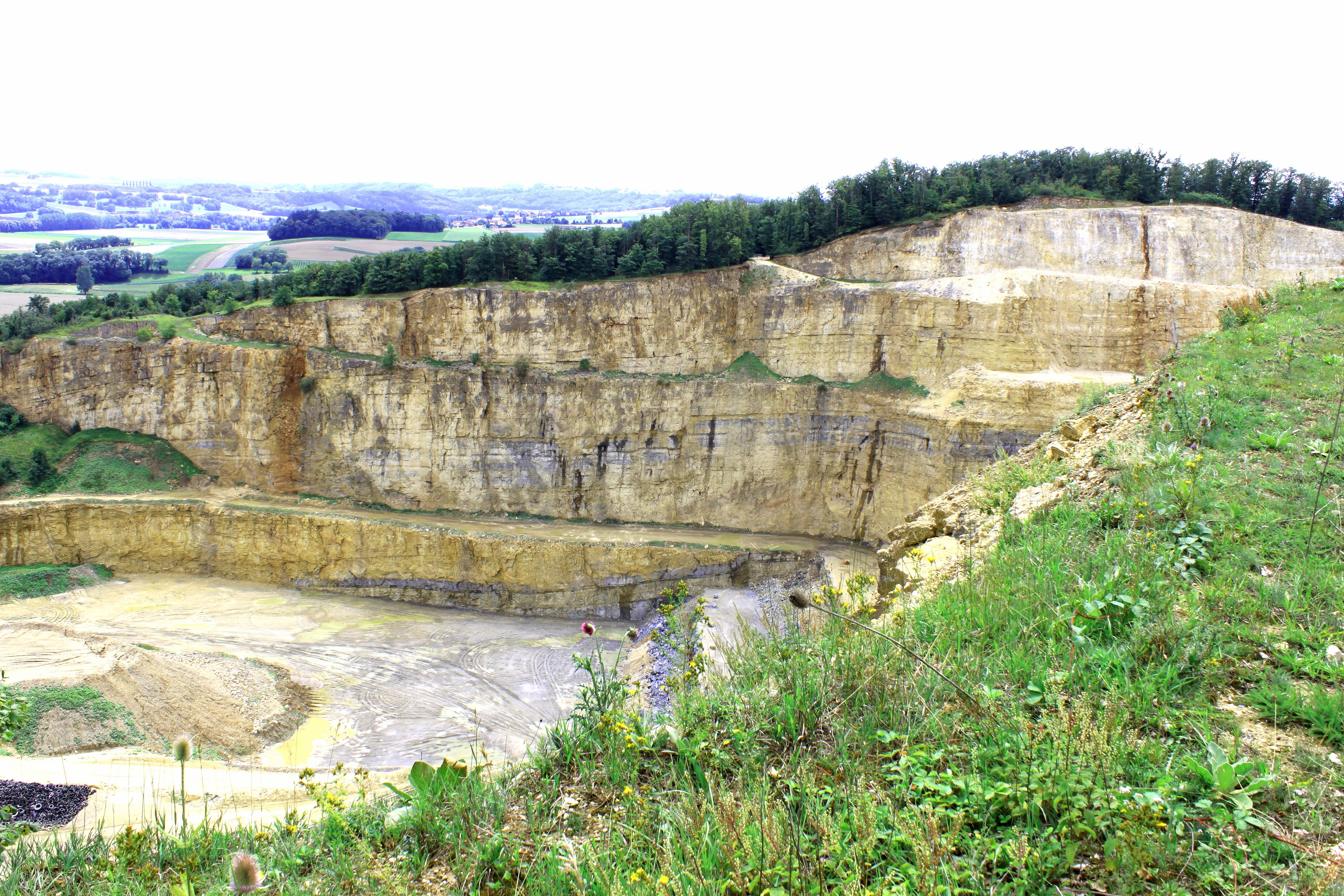
- The chalk mining pit as seen from the hill summit.

Highest point
- Elevation: 605 m (1,985 ft)
- Prominence: 115 m (377 ft)
- Coordinates: 46°39′25.42″N 6°32′16.84″E

Geography
- Location within Switzerland
- Location: Vaud, Switzerland

Le Mormont is a hill in the Swiss canton of Vaud, rising to an elevation of 605 metres, with a prominence of about 115 metres. It is part of the Éclépens municipality between lakes Neuchatel and Geneva. The name is first recorded in AD 814, as Mauromonte. It is derived from the Roman-era personal name Maurus.

== Geography ==
Le Mormont is a hill in the Swiss canton of Vaud, part of the Éclépens municipality, about halfway between lakes Neuchatel and Geneva. It is rising to an elevation of 605 metres, with a prominence of about 115 metres, forming a watershed between the Rhine and the Rhone basins, separating the Venoge and the Orbe valleys to the south and north, respectively. The mountain is topographically connected to the Jura Mountains to the west. East of Le Mormont runs the Entreroches gorge (460 m).

The nearest village is La Sarraz with 2700 inhabitants, 3 churches and twice hourly trains for Lafarge-Holcim ´s 100 employees.

== Archaeology ==
In 2009, the cantonal archaeological office of Vaud performed a watching brief excavation, which led to the discovery of a late La Tène period (c. 100 BC) Helvetic cult site with a total of 250 Celtic burial pits containing sacrificial deposits. Among the deposited goods were ceramic and bronze vessels, iron tools, jewelry, grinding stones, coins, and both animal and human remains. It was reported as being of unprecedented size and richness for the period. It is unclear whether the human remains represent a cemetery or evidence of human sacrifice. The site is of primary importance for Gaulish religion on the eve of the Roman conquest.

== Flora ==
The flora of Mormont is characterized by a dominance of thermophilic and submediterranean middle-European elements, with a surprising intrusion of mountain species in a site covered with hill vegetation. As of 2013 with more than 900 species recorded on the site, the Mormont has been considered one of the botanical hotspots of the canton of Vaud, with as a definite advantage the fact that it is still very preserved from invasive plants. It includes 200 rare species at the cantonal level, even at the Swiss level, threatened, and about 100 red listed, including a large number of orchids and a rare linden hybrid in the spontaneous state. The variety of oak trees is exceptionally rich.

== Modern history ==
In the 17th century, the Canal d’Entreroches was dug through the Entreroches gorge, enabling water transportation between the Rhone and the Rhine rivers. The canal ceased to be profitable in the 18th century, and when a bridge across the canal collapsed in 1829, it was shut down altogether. The course of the historical canal is now traversed by a railway tunnel of the Lausanne-Yverdon line.

Since 1953, Le Mormont has been substantially mined for chalk by multinational LafargeHolcim, producing 800,000 tons of cement and 400,000 tons of CO_{2} annually.

In 2006 to 2009 it was planned to extend the mining pit to the hill's summit, but because of the importance of the archaeological site, the mining operation was put on hold until a more detailed archaeological excavation could take place in 2014/15.

In 2016, the canton of Vaud issued a permit for expansion of the pit until 2029. Local inhabitants and environmental organisations filed a lawsuit, which failed in cantonal courts.

On October 17, 2020, 30-40 environmental activists occupied a zone à défendre (ZAD) on top of the hill above La Birette to protect the ecosystem from destruction. The Tribunal Fédéral decided in March 2021 that the expansion could proceed. The camp was evicted on March 30; stones and pyrotechnics were met with tear gas and rubber bullets, by the police.

== See also ==
- Helvetii
- Gournay-sur-Aronde
- Jura water correction
