= Canal d'Entreroches =

Defunct North Sea–Mediterranean Sea waterway

Coordinates: 46.656°N 6.550°E

The Canal d’Entreroches (English: canal between the cliffs) was planned in the 17th century as a link between the Rhine and Lake Geneva, and would have enabled inland waterway communication between the North Sea and the Mediterranean. It linked the river Thielle (German: Zihl) at Yverdon-les-Bains with the Venoge at Cossonay, a distance of 25 kilometres. It was completed in 1648, and remained in operation until 1829. Traces of some five kilometres of it still remain.

== History ==
The Thirty Years War led to a number of projects to link the Protestant Netherlands to the Mediterranean without the dangerous sea journey round Catholic Spain. In 1635, Elie Gouriet, the Breton quartermaster-general of the French forces in the United Provinces, delivered a proposal to the government of Bern to join the lakes of Neuchâtel and Geneva by a canal crossing the Mormont, which formed the watershed between the two lakes, through the Gorge at Entreroches, near Éclépens. The authorities agreed to the plan on the condition that the canal would run entirely through Bernese territory, making stipulations about the width of the wayleave and the exploitation of adjacent watercourses and forests.

A group of investors financed the project, and work began in 1638 from the eastern end, where the river Thielle was already navigable for 8 kilometres up to the confluence of the Orbe and the Talent. The first section opened in 1640. Seven locks raised the canal 14 metres over 9 kilometres to the summit at Entreroches. The western section, falling 19 metres over 8 kilometres to Cossonay, with 6 locks, took eight more years to build, being hampered by floods, unforeseen difficulties in the cuttings, and a shortage of funds. The water supply was assured by an arm with a single lock connecting the summit level to the River Venoge at La Graveyre, close to Éclépens village.

From Cossonay, the Venoge fell steeply to the level of Lake Geneva. The 40 locks needed over 12 kilometres to overcome the 59 metre height difference between Cossonay and Morges proved too much for the investors, and this section was never built. Goods had to be transhipped and carried by road. The steep fall of the Rhône below Geneva also meant that the canal never achieved more than local significance. In 1679, a new terminus was built at Le Bouquet, four kilometres north of Cossonay, and gradually this lowest section, which had been difficult and expensive to maintain, fell out of use.

The canal was profitable until the mid-18th century, though the amount carried was low - around 6000 tons a year, achieving a maximum in 1719/20 of 8532 wagon-loads (approximately 6680 tons). 94% of the traffic was from south to north. The main cargo (85%) was wine from the vineyards around Lake Geneva and salt from Gex, for transport to Bern and Solothurn. The Plessis-Gouret family continued to be responsible for its operation.

Profitability declined at the end of the 18th century, and a shortage of funds led to a lack of maintenance. Bankruptcy was declared in 1797. The collapse of the aqueduct carrying the River Talent over the canal near Chavornay in 1829 finally led to the canal's abandonment. The land passed to the Caisse d'Épargne de Neuchâtel (the Neuchatel Savings Bank), and subsequently to the Canton of Vaud.

A permanent navigable connection between the Rhône and the Rhine was finally achieved in France in 1833 with the completion of the Canal du Rhône au Rhin.

== Operation ==
A towpath ran the length of the canal. Haulage appears to have been by teams of three men. The locks were mainly turf-sided, and of the guillotine kind. The lock gates were lifted by a large wheel some 5 metres in diameter.

A notable feature of this canal was that all lock gates were left open and the bed was left dry during the summer months when it was not in use. When a cargo was expected, a sluice was opened to allow water from the Venoge to enter the summit level, the lock gates were closed and the canal filled.

No picture of the boats using the canal has survived. From documentary evidence, we know that they were some 20 metres in length, 3.5 metres broad, drawing 0.75 metre. They carried about 25 tons, and were flat-bottomed, with a pointed prow and a square stern. They were steered with a long oar, or gaffe.

== Pictures ==
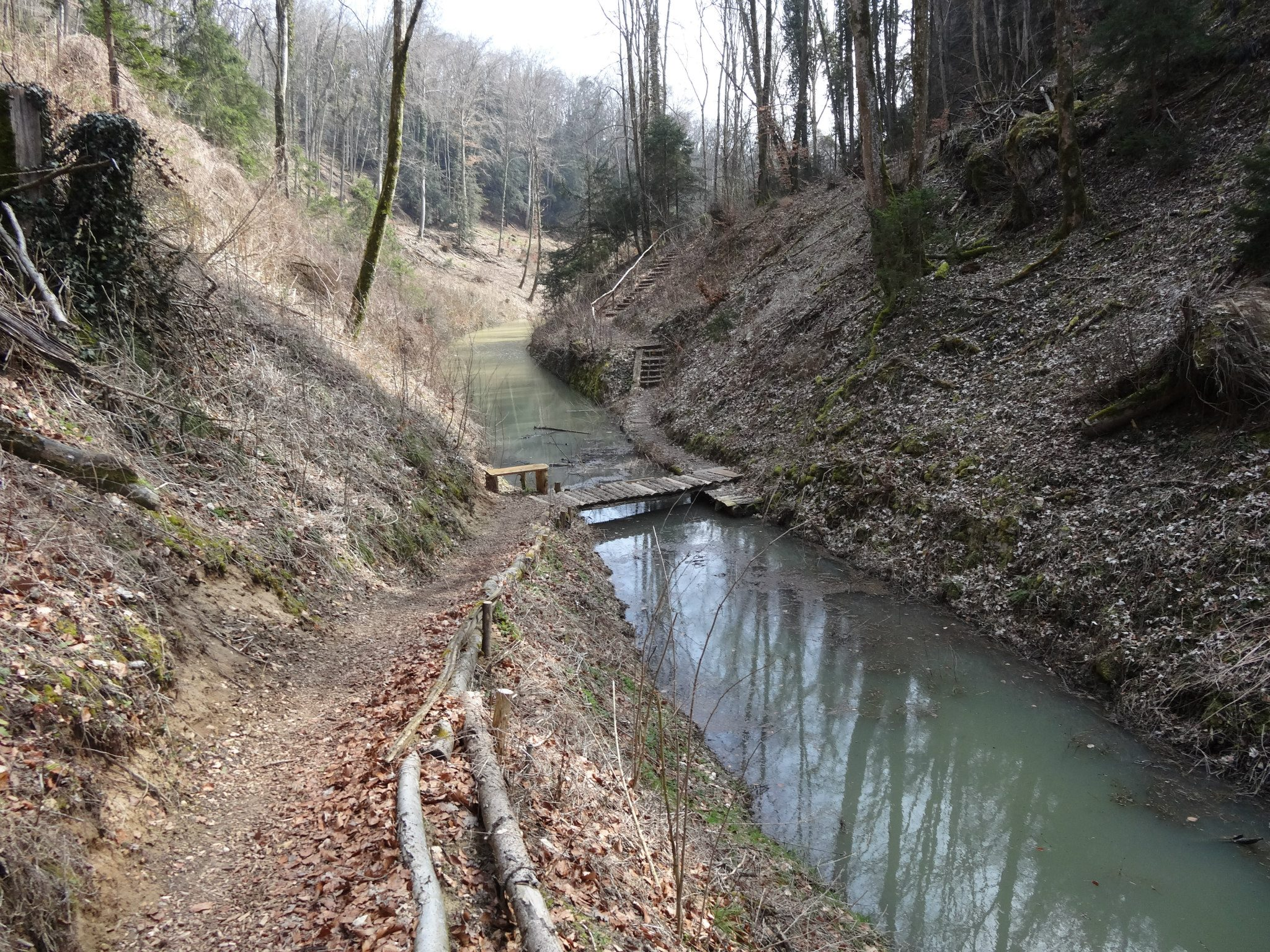
The Canal d'Entreroches passing through Mount Mormont

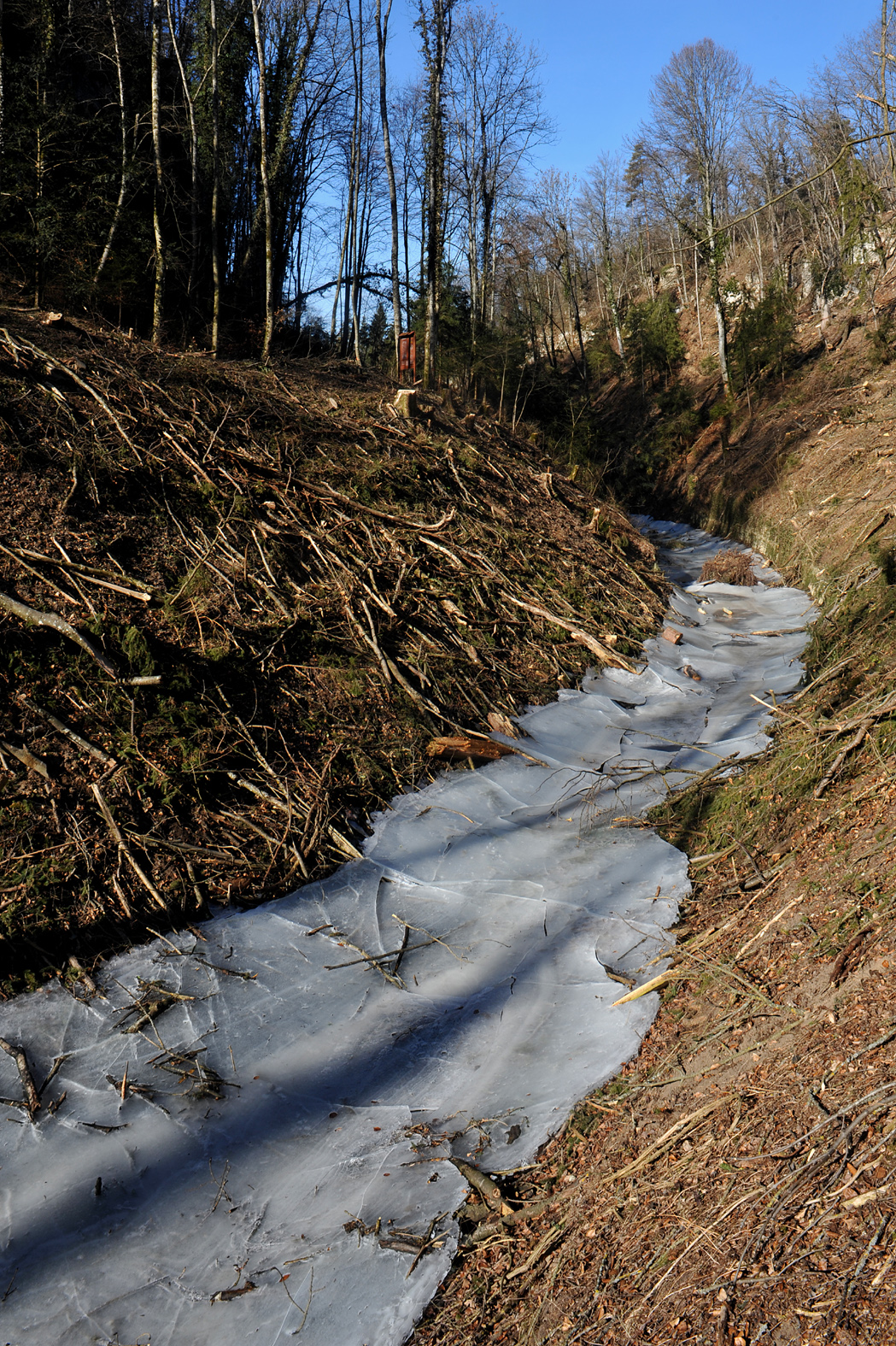
Another view of the summit pound at Entreroches

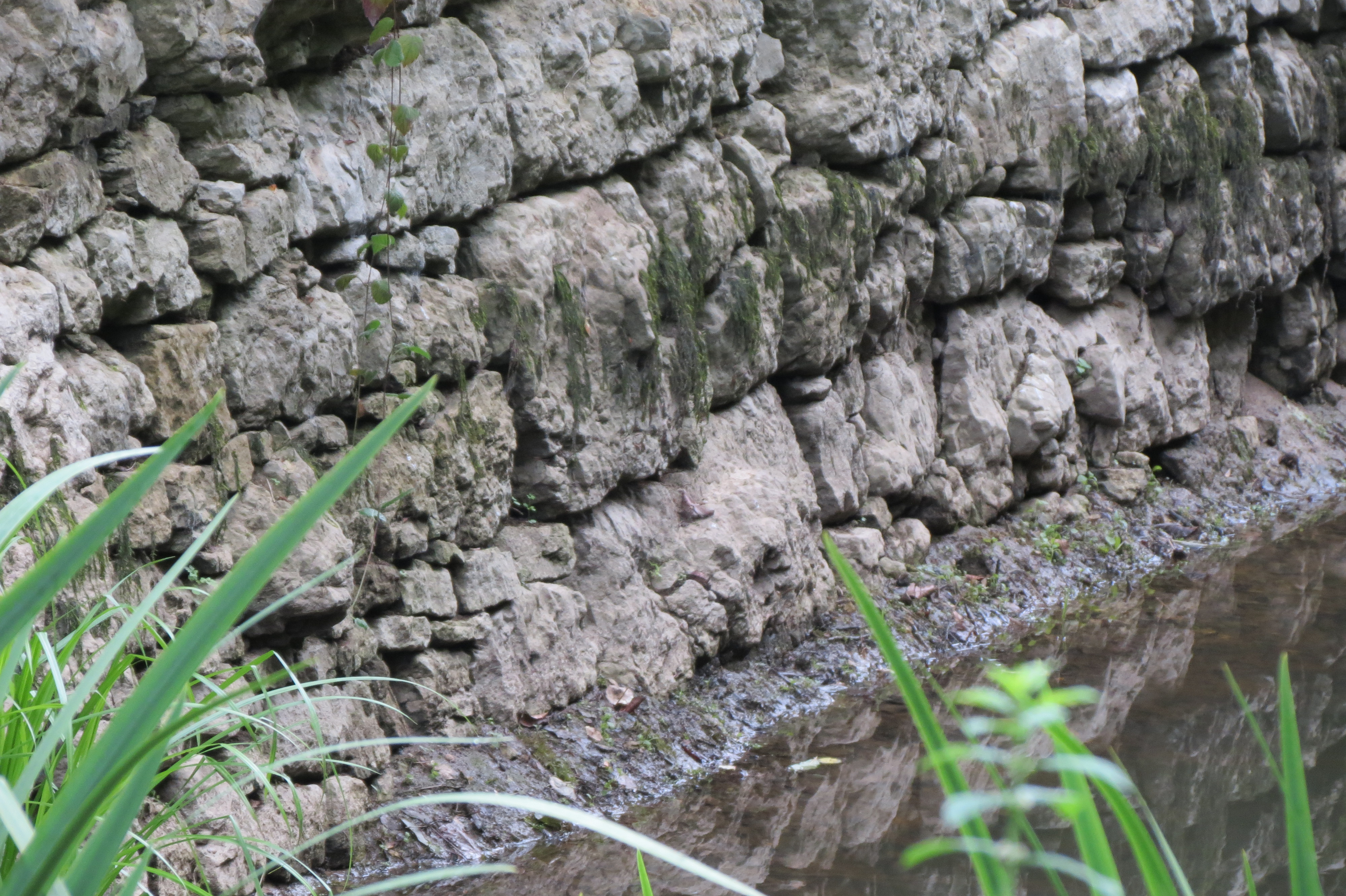
Detail of the walling on the summit pound

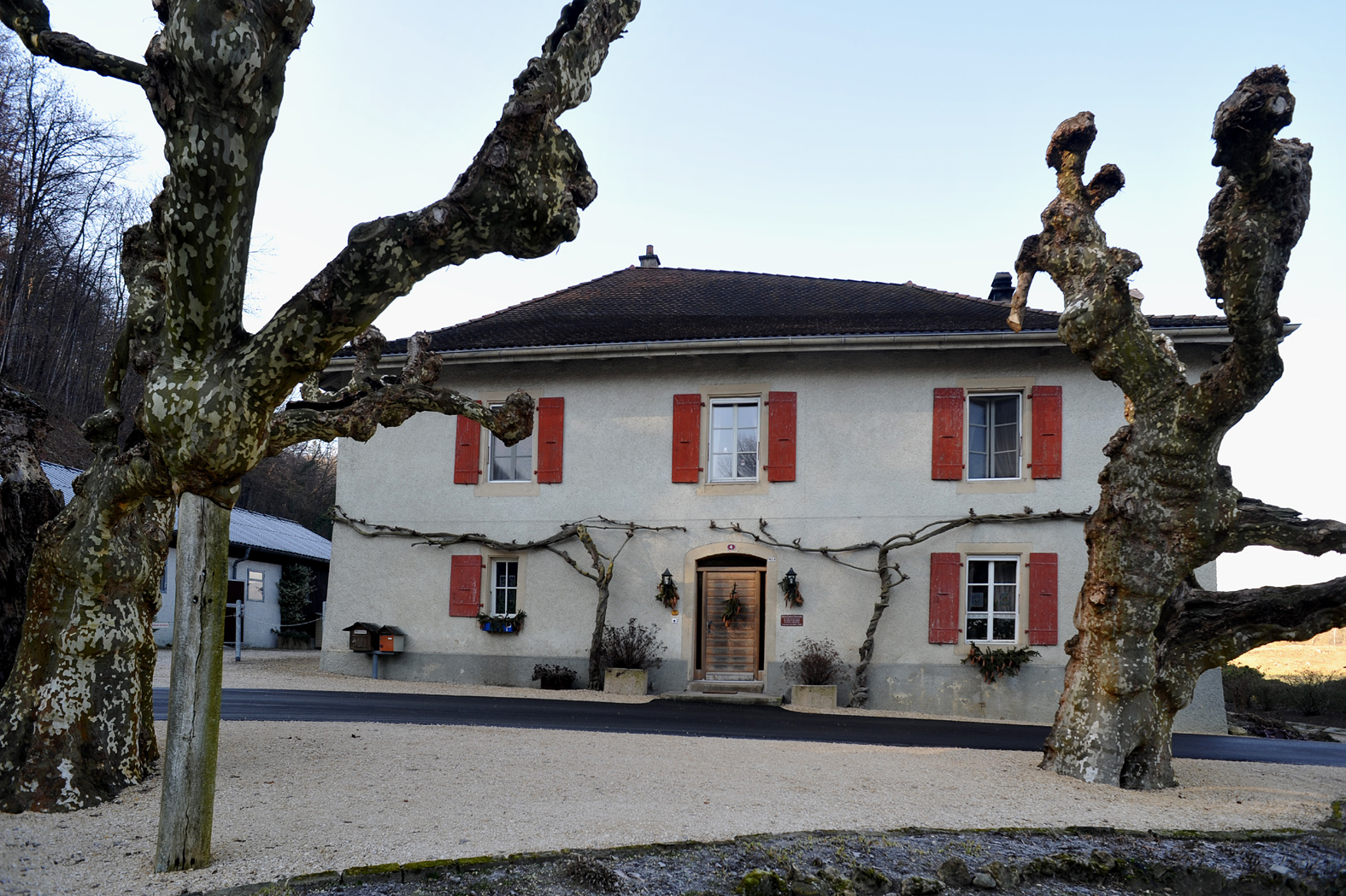
The former transhipment house at Entreroches

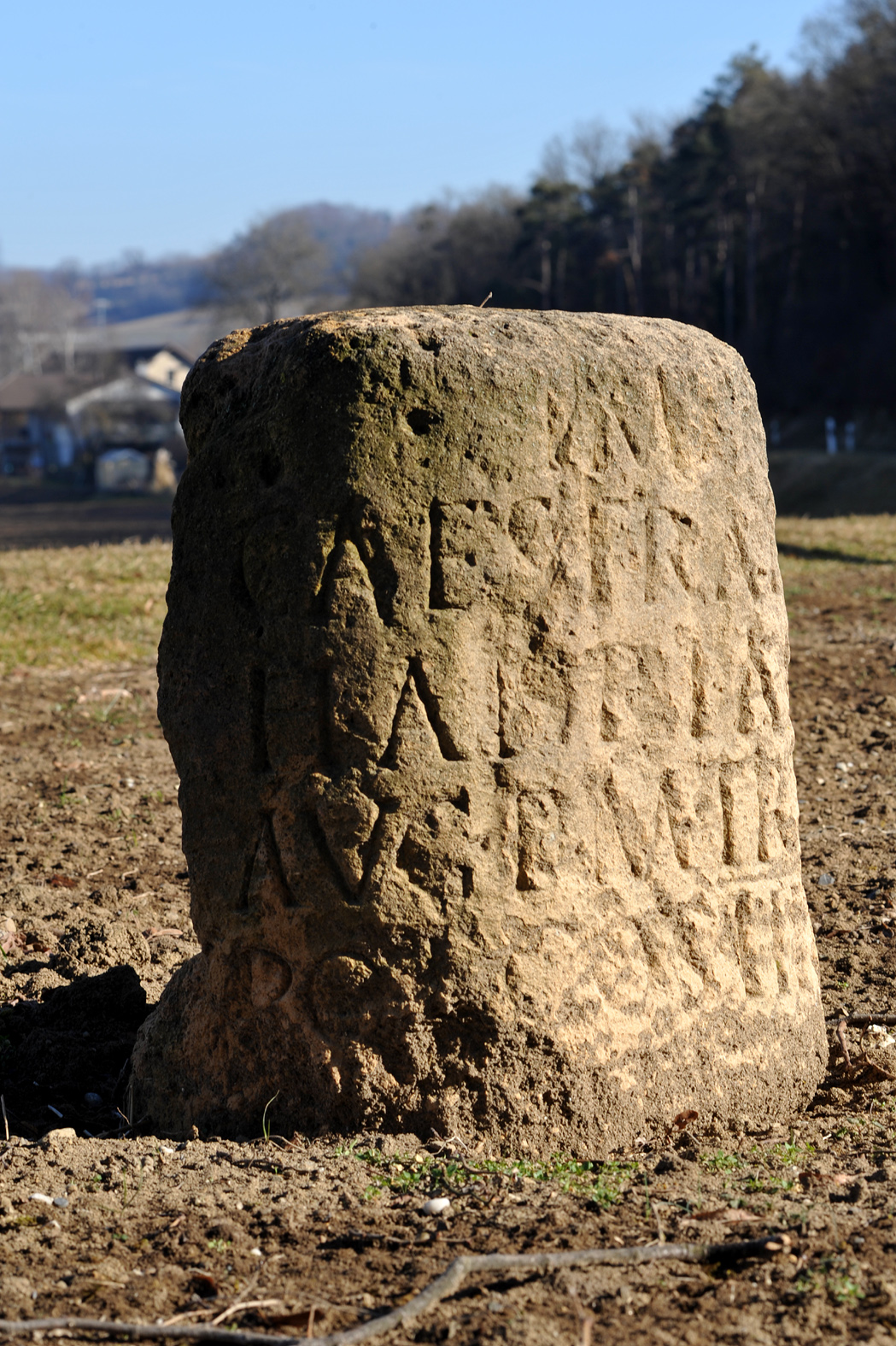
A Roman milestone discovered during the construction of the canal in 1640

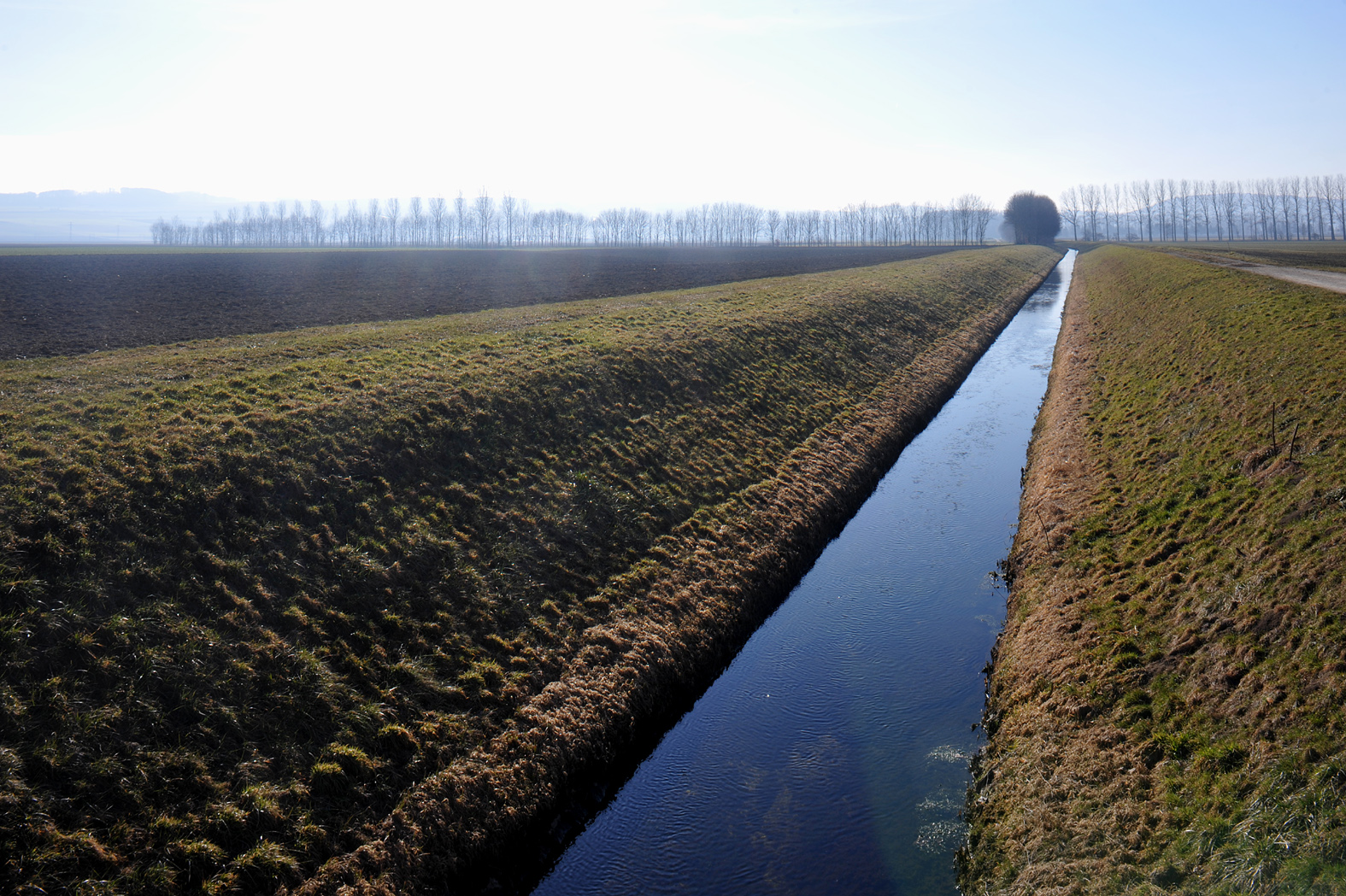
The Canal d’Entreroches in the Orbe Plain

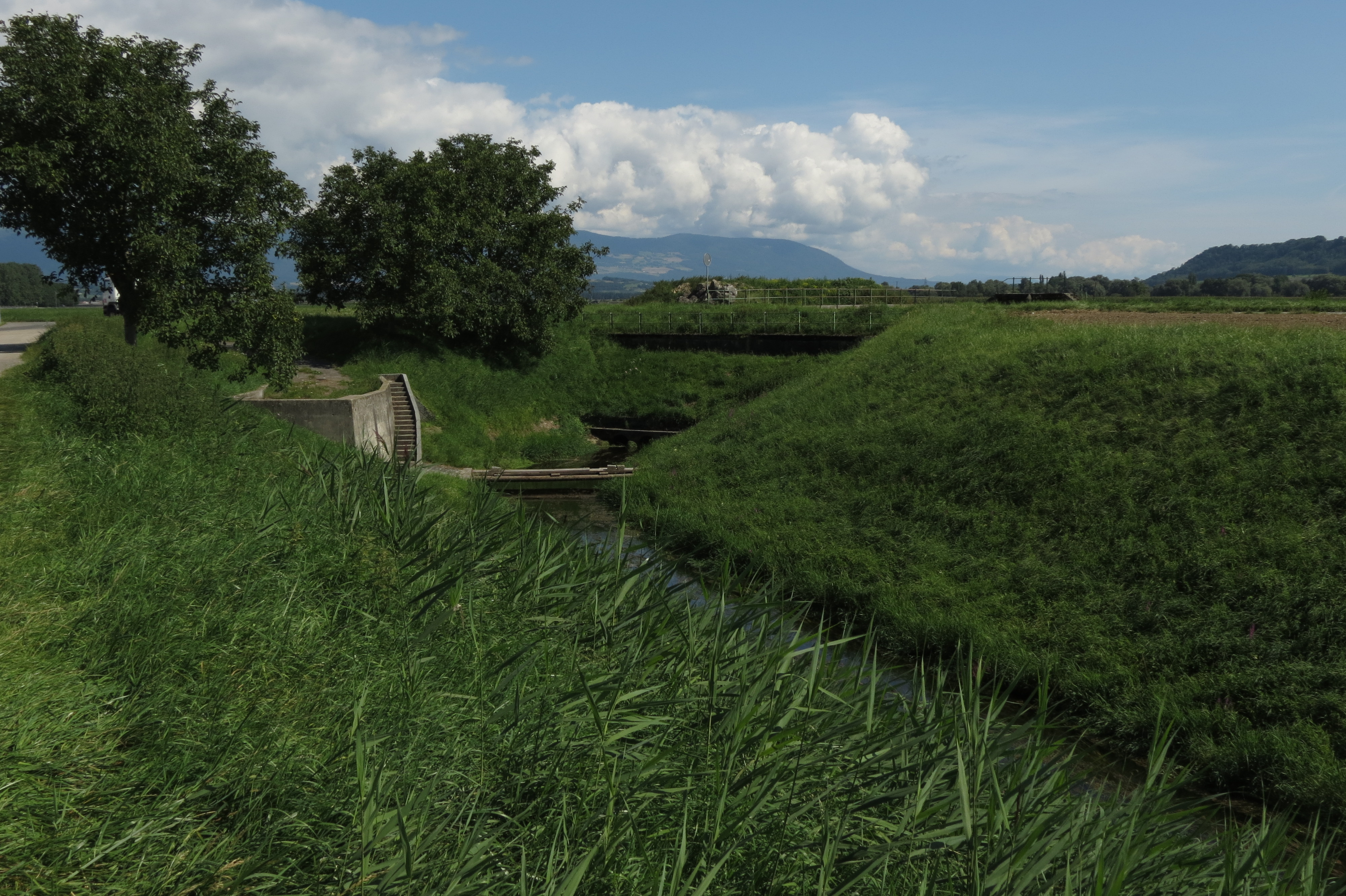
The aqueduct carrying the River Talent over the Canal, whose collapse in 1829 permanently disrupted navigation.

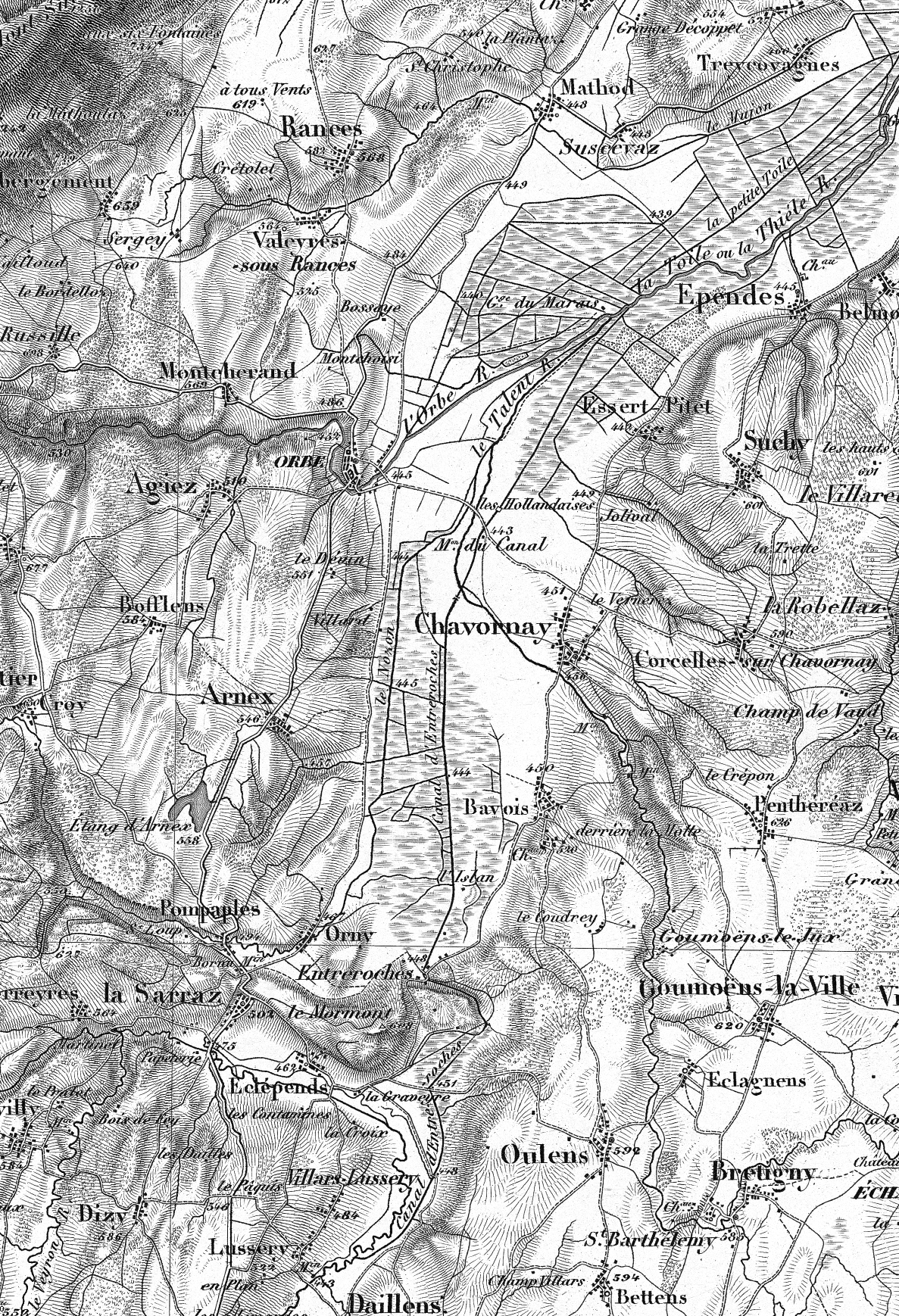
The Canal shown on the Dufour map of 1865

== Literature ==
- John Landry, Le canal d'Entreroches : Causeries Yverdonnoises, 1923
- Paul-Louis Pelet, Le canal d'Entreroches. Histoire d'une idée, 1946
- Wanderungen auf historischen Wegen, Inventar historische Verkehrswege der Schweiz, Chapter 15, Ott Verlag, Thun, ISBN 3-7225-6404-2.
- wandern.ch 2/2014 (May 2014) ISSN 2296-2190
- Klaus Grewe (Ed.): Canal d’Entreroches. Der Bau eines Schiffahrtsweges von der Nordsee bis zum Mittelmeer im 17. Jahrhundert. Forschungsbeiträge des Förderkreises Vermessungstechnisches Museum e.V., Stuttgart 1987, ISBN 3-87919-143-3.
