= Éclépens =

- Municipality
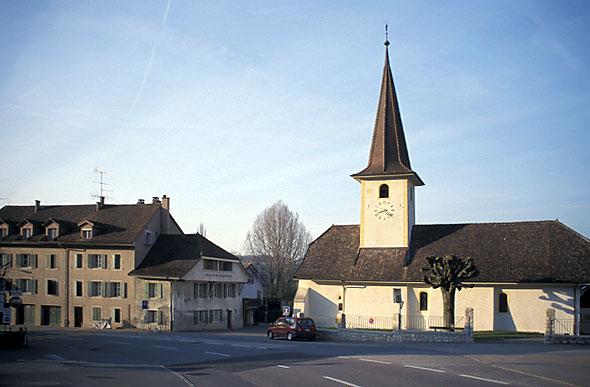
- Éclépens village center

- Flag Coat of arms
- Location of Éclépens
- Location within Switzerland Location within Canton of Vaud
- Coordinates: 46°39′N 06°32′E
- Country: Switzerland
- Canton: Vaud
- District: Morges

Government
  - Mayor: Syndic; Claude Dutoit

Area
  - Total: 5.81 km^{2} (2.24 sq mi)
- Elevation: 461 m (1,512 ft)

Population (2003)
  - Total: 915
  - Density: 157/km^{2} (408/sq mi)
- Time zone: UTC+01:00 (CET)
  - Summer (DST): UTC+02:00 (CEST)
- Postal code: 1312
- SFOS number: 5482
- ISO 3166 code: CH-VD
- Surrounded by: Bavois, Daillens, La Sarraz, Lussery-Villars, Orny, Oulens-sous-Échallens
- Website: www.eclepens.ch

Éclépens (French pronunciation: [eklepɑ̃]) is a municipality of the canton of Vaud in Switzerland, located in the district of Morges.

== History ==
Éclépens is first mentioned in 814 as Sclepedingus.

== Geography ==
Éclépens has an area, as of 2009, of 5.81 square kilometers (2.24 sq mi). Of this area, 3.07 km^{2} (1.19 sq mi) or 52.8% is used for agricultural purposes, while 1.52 km^{2} (0.59 sq mi) or 26.2% is forested. Of the rest of the land, 1.16 km^{2} (0.45 sq mi) or 20.0% is settled (buildings or roads), 0.05 km^{2} (12 acres) or 0.9% is either rivers or lakes and 0.02 km^{2} (4.9 acres) or 0.3% is unproductive land.

Of the built up area, industrial buildings made up 4.6% of the total area while housing and buildings made up 4.6% and transportation infrastructure made up 5.5%. Power and water infrastructure as well as other special developed areas made up 4.8% of the area Out of the forested land, 23.1% of the total land area is heavily forested and 3.1% is covered with orchards or small clusters of trees. Of the agricultural land, 44.2% is used for growing crops and 7.9% is pastures. All the water in the municipality is flowing water.

The municipality was part of the Cossonay District until it was dissolved on 31 August 2006, and Éclépens became part of the new district of Morges.

== Coat of arms ==
The blazon of the municipal coat of arms is Argent, on a Coupeaux Vert a Lion rampant Gules, a Bar wavy overall.

== Demographics ==
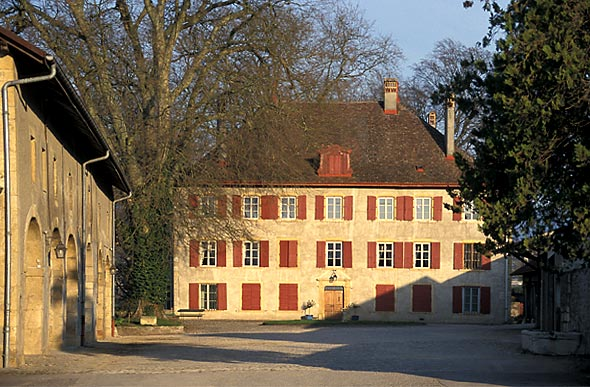
Éclépens castle

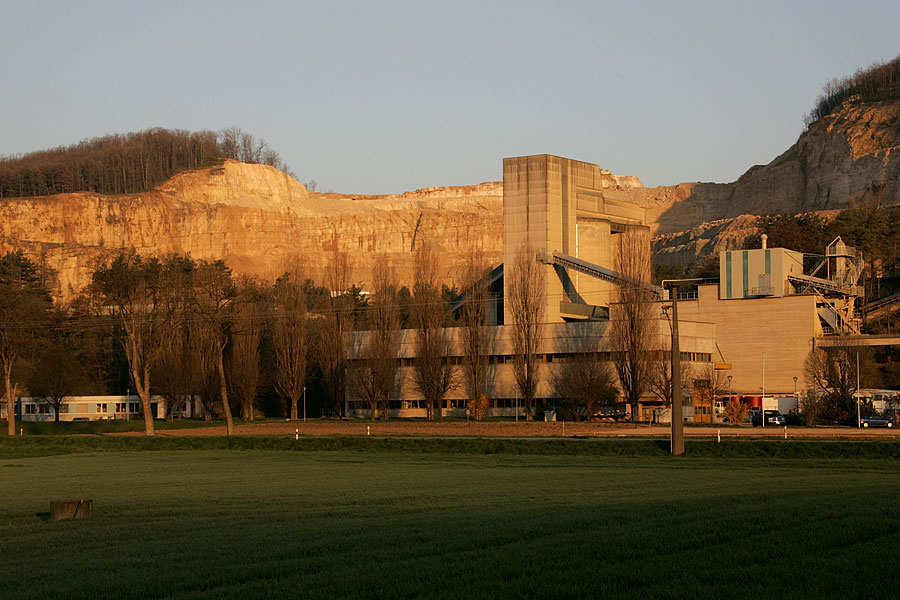
Holcim cement works

Éclépens has a population (as of December 2020) of 1,218. As of 2008, 22.4% of the population are resident foreign nationals. Over the last 10 years (1999–2009) the population has changed at a rate of 11.2%. It has changed at a rate of 6.5% due to migration and at a rate of 4.3% due to births and deaths.

Most of the population (as of 2000) speaks French (810 or 89.6%), with German being second most common (27 or 3.0%) and Italian being third (20 or 2.2%).

Of the population in the municipality 217 or about 24.0% were born in Éclépens and lived there in 2000. There were 376 or 41.6% who were born in the same canton, while 122 or 13.5% were born somewhere else in Switzerland, and 167 or 18.5% were born outside of Switzerland.

In 2008 there were 3 live births to Swiss citizens and 6 births to non-Swiss citizens, and in same time span there were 5 deaths of Swiss citizens. Ignoring immigration and emigration, the population of Swiss citizens decreased by 2 while the foreign population increased by 6. There were 2 Swiss men who immigrated back to Switzerland and 1 Swiss woman who emigrated from Switzerland. At the same time, there were 3 non-Swiss men who immigrated from another country to Switzerland. The total Swiss population change in 2008 (from all sources, including moves across municipal borders) was an increase of 2 and the non-Swiss population increased by 9 people. This represents a population growth rate of 1.1%.

The age distribution, as of 2009, in Éclépens is; 101 children or 10.4% of the population are between 0 and 9 years old and 119 teenagers or 12.2% are between 10 and 19. Of the adult population, 131 people or 13.4% of the population are between 20 and 29 years old. 135 people or 13.9% are between 30 and 39, 168 people or 17.2% are between 40 and 49, and 120 people or 12.3% are between 50 and 59. The senior population distribution is 103 people or 10.6% of the population are between 60 and 69 years old, 62 people or 6.4% are between 70 and 79, there are 33 people or 3.4% who are between 80 and 89, and there are 2 people or 0.2% who are 90 and older.

As of 2000, there were 362 people who were single and never married in the municipality. There were 471 married individuals, 34 widows or widowers and 37 individuals who are divorced.

As of 2000, there were 360 private households in the municipality, and an average of 2.5 persons per household. There were 94 households that consist of only one person and 27 households with five or more people. Out of a total of 367 households that answered this question, 25.6% were households made up of just one person and there was 1 adult who lived with their parents. Of the rest of the households, there are 114 married couples without children, 132 married couples with children There were 11 single parents with a child or children. There were 8 households that were made up of unrelated people and 7 households that were made up of some sort of institution or another collective housing.

In 2000 there were 143 single family homes (or 66.8% of the total) out of a total of 214 inhabited buildings. There were 43 multi-family buildings (20.1%), along with 19 multi-purpose buildings that were mostly used for housing (8.9%) and 9 other use buildings (commercial or industrial) that also had some housing (4.2%). Of the single family homes 27 were built before 1919, while 17 were built between 1990 and 2000. The greatest number of single family homes (28) were built between 1961 and 1970. The most multi-family homes (20) were built before 1919 and the next most (8) were built between 1981 and 1990. There was 1 multi-family house built between 1996 and 2000.

In 2000 there were 386 apartments in the municipality. The most common apartment size was 3 rooms of which there were 109. There were 10 single room apartments and 97 apartments with five or more rooms. Of these apartments, a total of 350 apartments (90.7% of the total) were permanently occupied, while 19 apartments (4.9%) were seasonally occupied and 17 apartments (4.4%) were empty. As of 2009, the construction rate of new housing units was 3.1 new units per 1000 residents. The vacancy rate for the municipality, in 2010, was 0.24%.

The historical population is given in the following chart:

== Heritage sites of national significance ==
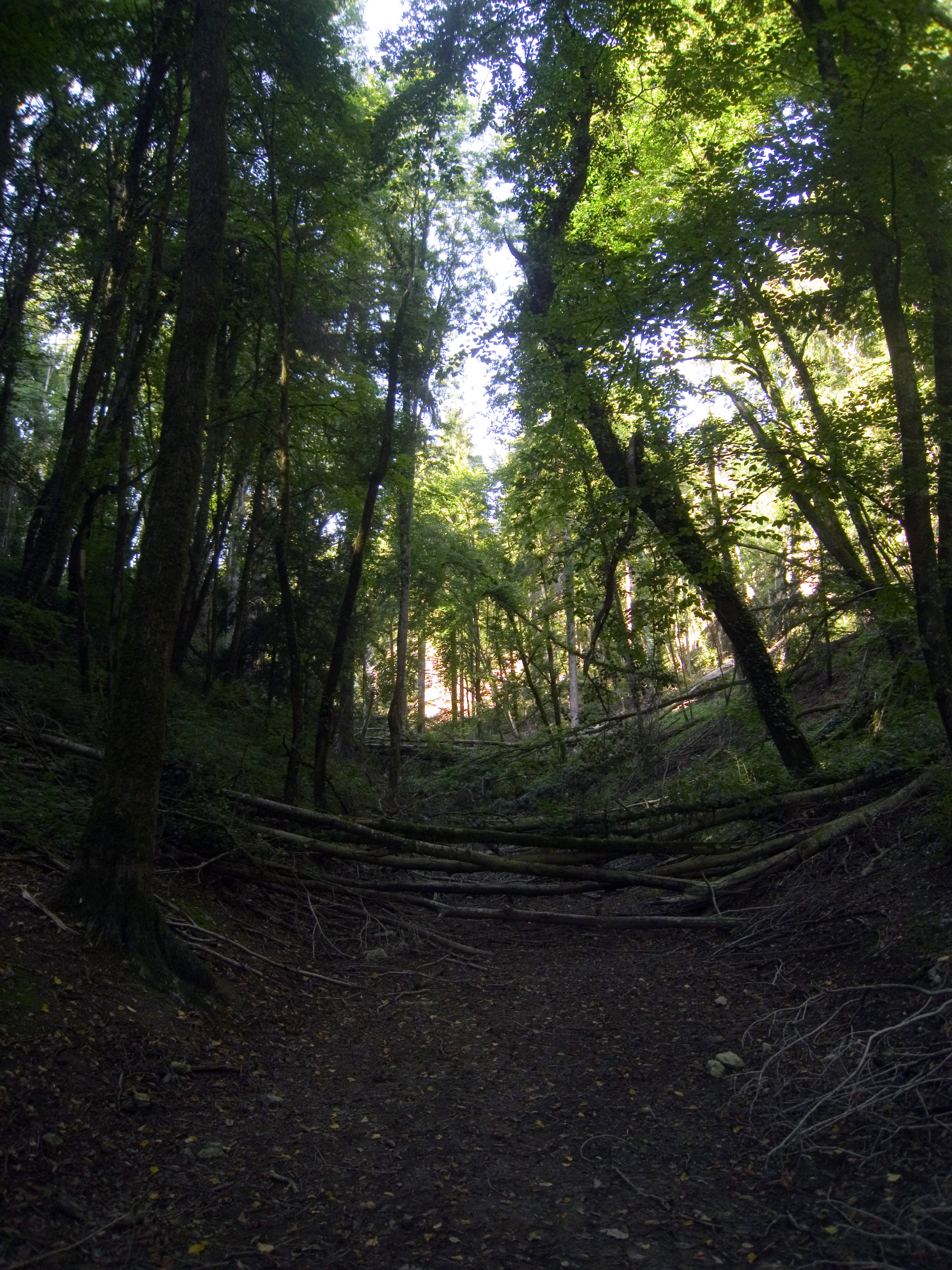
Part of the abandoned D’Entreroches canal

The abandoned D’Entreroches canal and Le Mormont, a proto-historic through Iron Age archeological site are listed as Swiss heritage site of national significance. The entire village of Éclépens is part of the Inventory of Swiss Heritage Sites.

== Politics ==
In the 2007 federal election the most popular party was the SP which received 29.02% of the vote. The next three most popular parties were the SVP (22.55%), the Green Party (13.8%) and the FDP (11.15%). In the federal election, a total of 290 votes were cast, and the voter turnout was 48.9%.

== Economy ==
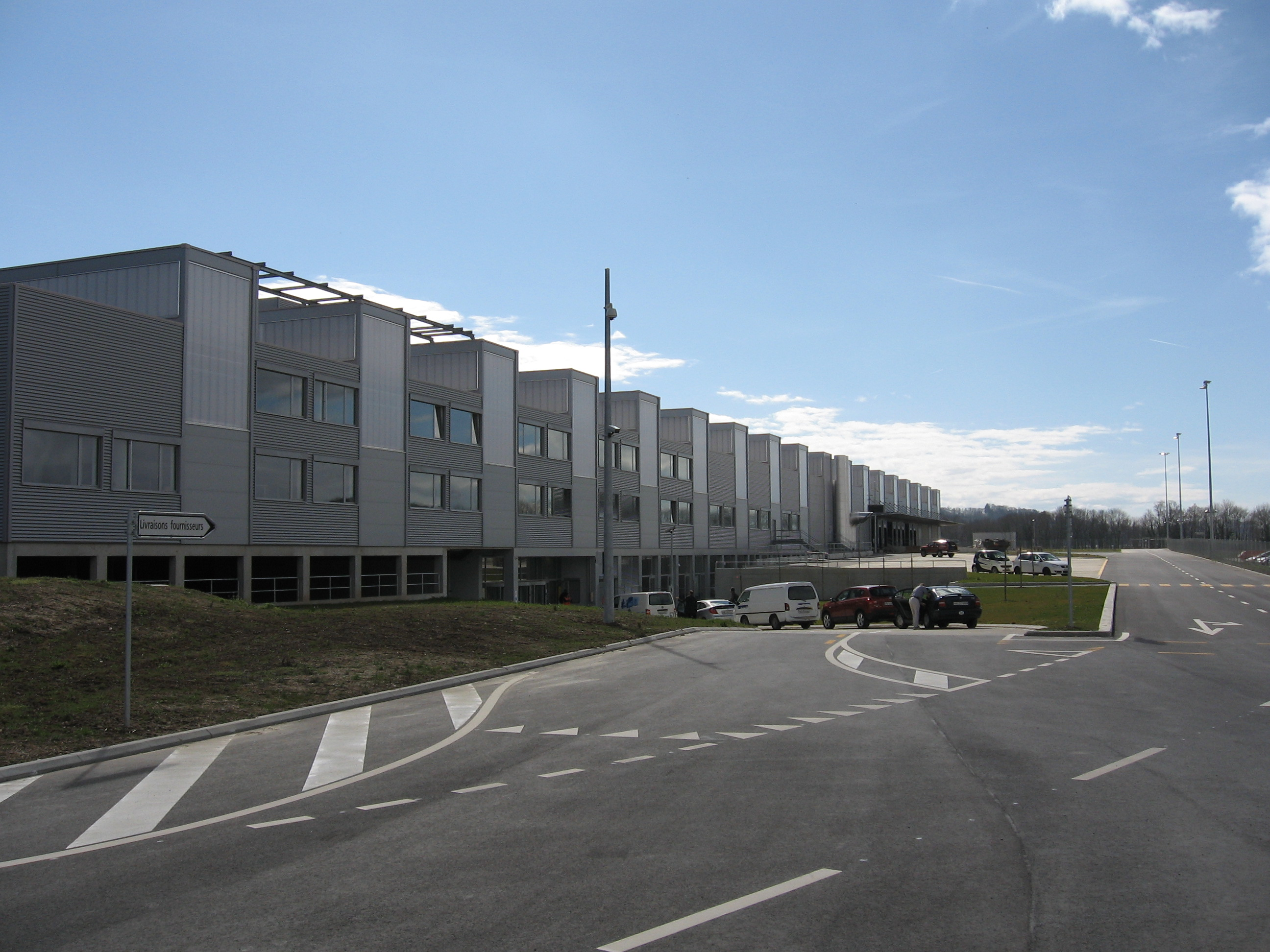
Postal center in Éclépens

As of 2010, Éclépens had an unemployment rate of 4.4%. As of 2008, there were 31 people employed in the primary economic sector and about 8 businesses involved in this sector. 642 people were employed in the secondary sector and there were 16 businesses in this sector. 498 people were employed in the tertiary sector, with 28 businesses in this sector. There were 465 residents of the municipality who were employed in some capacity, of which females made up 39.1% of the workforce.

In 2008 the total number of full-time equivalent jobs was 1,082. The number of jobs in the primary sector was 22, all of which were in agriculture. The number of jobs in the secondary sector was 622 of which 479 or (77.0%) were in manufacturing, 4 or (0.6%) were in mining and 88 (14.1%) were in construction. The number of jobs in the tertiary sector was 438. In the tertiary sector; 42 or 9.6% were in wholesale or retail sales or the repair of motor vehicles, 355 or 81.1% were in the movement and storage of goods, 11 or 2.5% were in a hotel or restaurant, 7 or 1.6% were in the information industry, 3 or 0.7% were technical professionals or scientists, 11 or 2.5% were in education and 3 or 0.7% were in health care.

In 2000, there were 449 workers who commuted into the municipality and 307 workers who commuted away. The municipality is a net importer of workers, with about 1.5 workers entering the municipality for every one leaving. About 6.2% of the workforce coming into Éclépens are coming from outside Switzerland. Of the working population, 11% used public transportation to get to work, and 66.5% used a private car.

== Religion ==
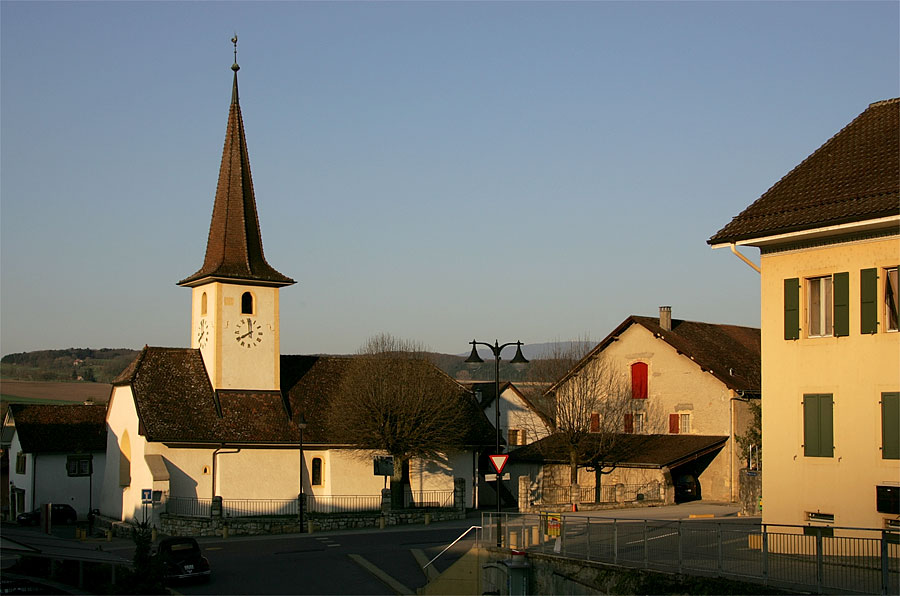
Village church

From the 2000 census, 221 or 24.4% were Roman Catholic, while 474 or 52.4% belonged to the Swiss Reformed Church. Of the rest of the population, there were 5 members of an Orthodox church (or about 0.55% of the population), and there were 24 individuals (or about 2.65% of the population) who belonged to another Christian church. There was 1 individual who was Jewish, and 19 (or about 2.10% of the population) who were Islamic. There was 1 individual who belonged to another church. 120 (or about 13.27% of the population) belonged to no church, are agnostic or atheist, and 51 individuals (or about 5.64% of the population) did not answer the question.

== Education ==
In Éclépens about 327 or (36.2%) of the population have completed non-mandatory upper secondary education, and 113 or (12.5%) have completed additional higher education (either university or a Fachhochschule). Of the 113 who completed tertiary schooling, 55.8% were Swiss men, 32.7% were Swiss women, 9.7% were non-Swiss men.

In the 2009/2010 school year there were a total of 111 students in the Éclépens school district. In the Vaud cantonal school system, two years of non-obligatory pre-school are provided by the political districts. During the school year, the political district provided pre-school care for a total of 631 children of which 203 children (32.2%) received subsidized pre-school care. The canton's primary school program requires students to attend for four years. There were 57 students in the municipal primary school program. The obligatory lower secondary school program lasts for six years and there were 54 students in those schools.

As of 2000, there were 33 students in Éclépens who came from another municipality, while 111 residents attended schools outside the municipality.

== Transportation ==
The municipality has a railway station, Eclépens, on the Jura Foot line. It has regular service to Grandson, Yverdon-les-Bains, and Lausanne.
