= Mouettes Genevoises Navigation =

Overview
- Locale: Geneva, Switzerland
- Transit type: Water bus
- Website: mouettesgenevoises.ch

Operation
- Began operation: 1897
System map
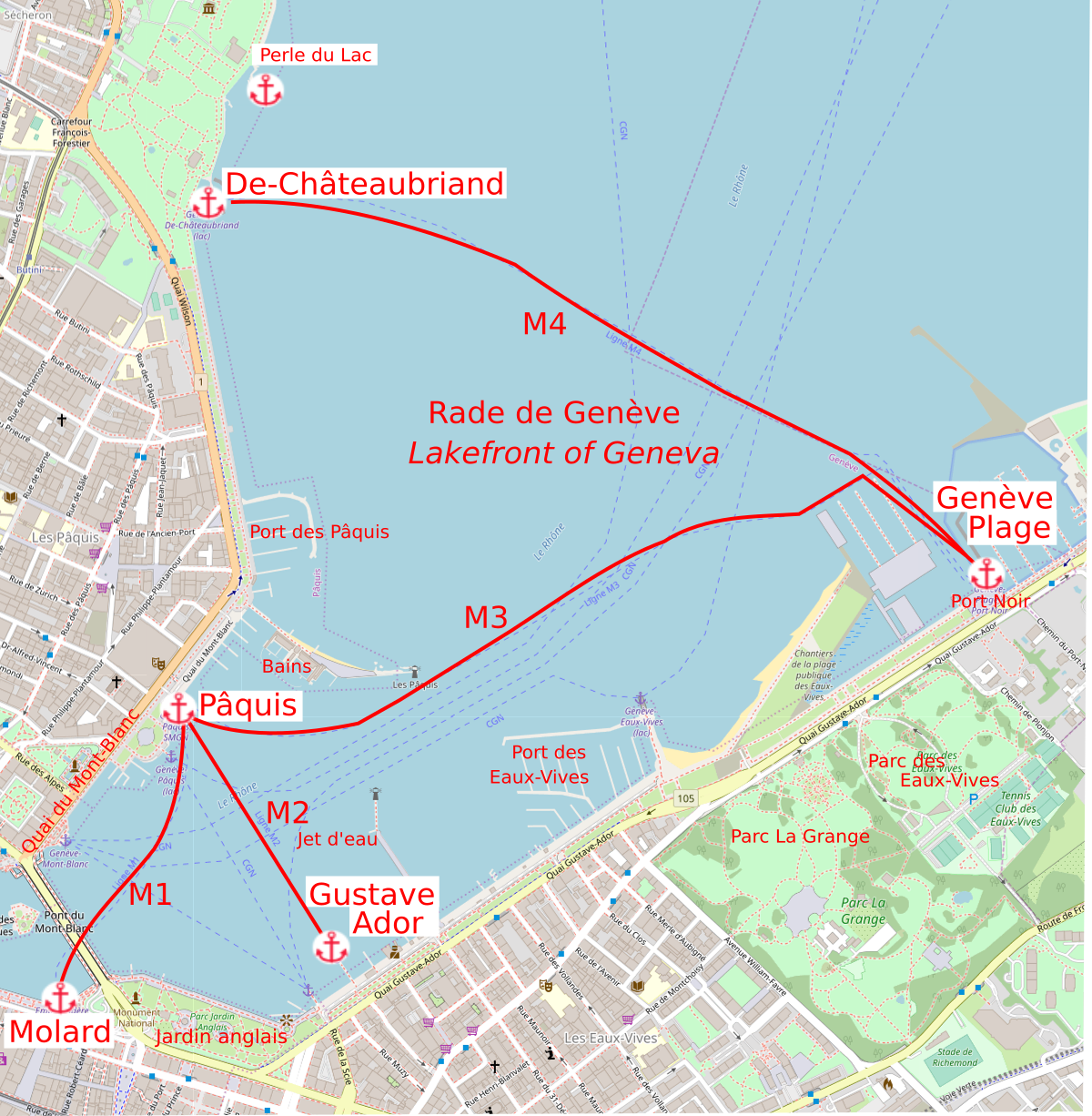

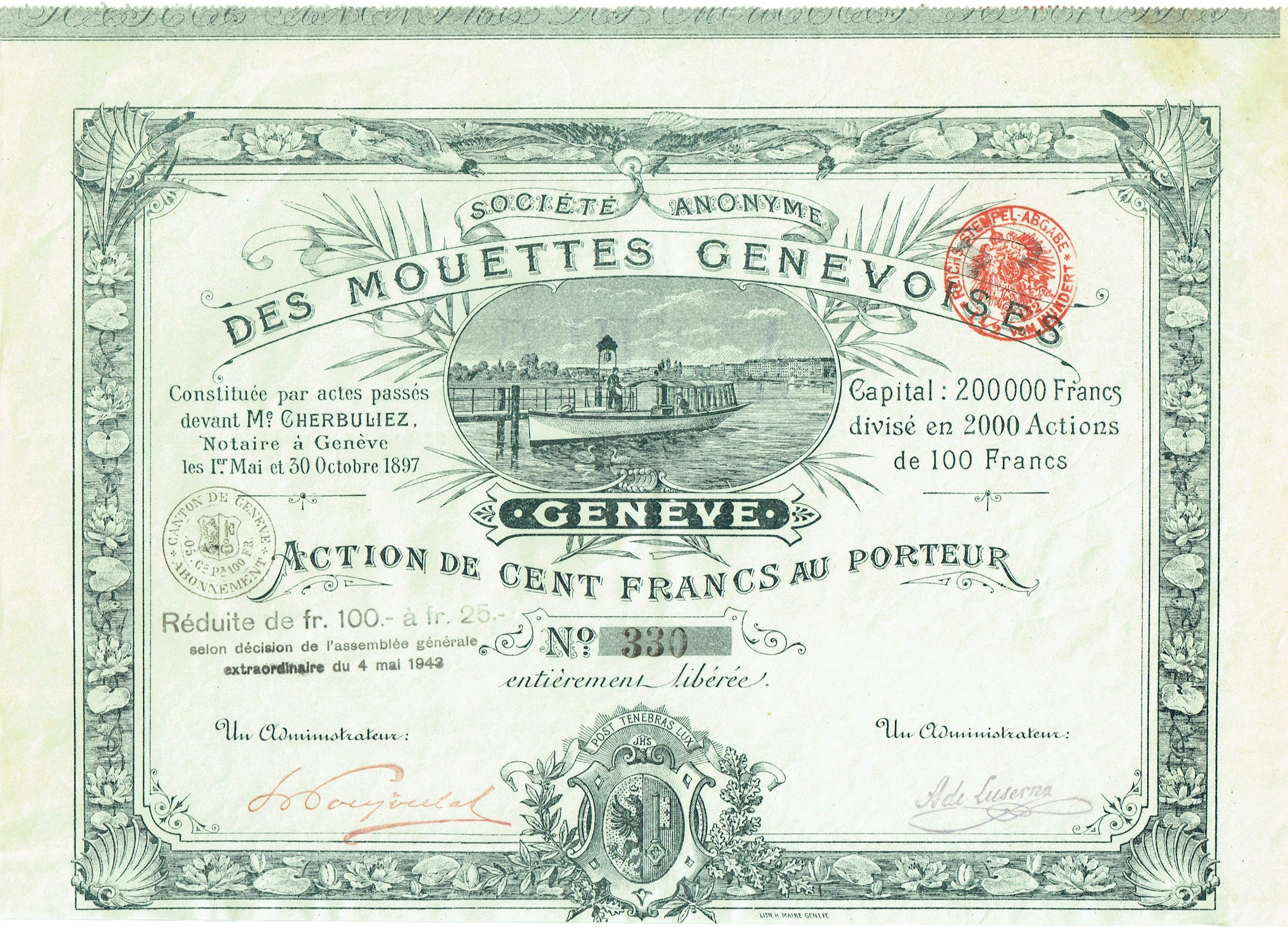
Share of the S. A. des Mouettes Genevoises, issued 30. October 1897

Mouettes Genevoises Navigation is a private water bus operator in Geneva, Switzerland, operating four lines across the western end of Lake Geneva. A member of the integrated Unireso fare network, its head office is in Geneva. The modern company was founded in 1897 by the merger of three boat operators.

== Name ==
"Mouettes" translates to "gulls". The origin of this name is not well understood, but may date from an era of many boat companies, each named after different birds. The boats today are usually painted in yellow and red, the heraldic colors of Geneva.

== Lines ==
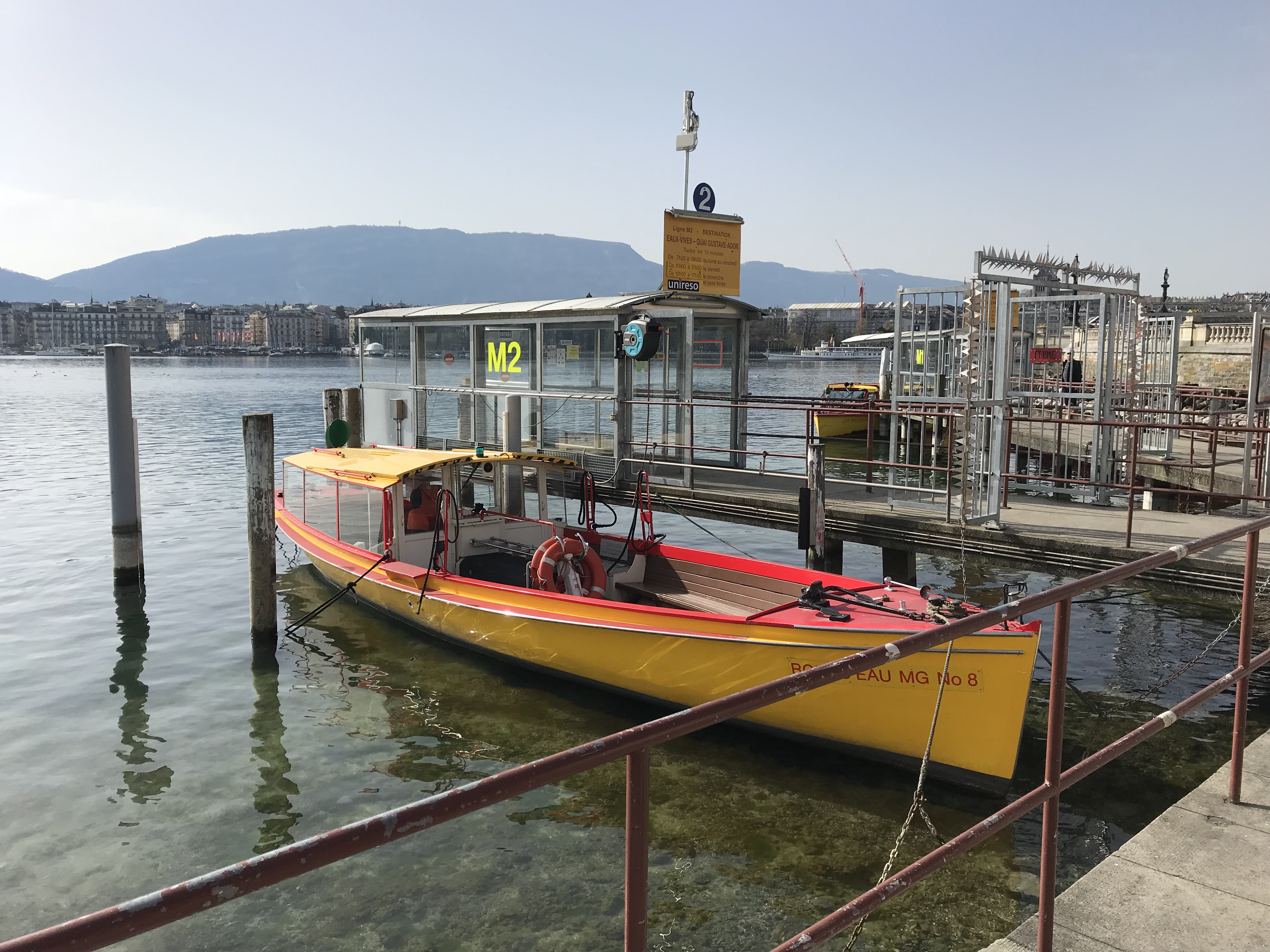
A docked mouette, named for Rousseau

The four lines are considered integral to the city's transport network and thus receive public funding.

- M1 Line Pâquis – Molard
- M2 Line Pâquis – Quai Gustave Ador
- M3 Line Pâquis – Geneva beach
- M4 Line Geneva beach – De-Chateaubriand

== See also ==
- Transport in Switzerland
