= Lake Thun =

Lake in Switzerland

Lake Thun Thunersee
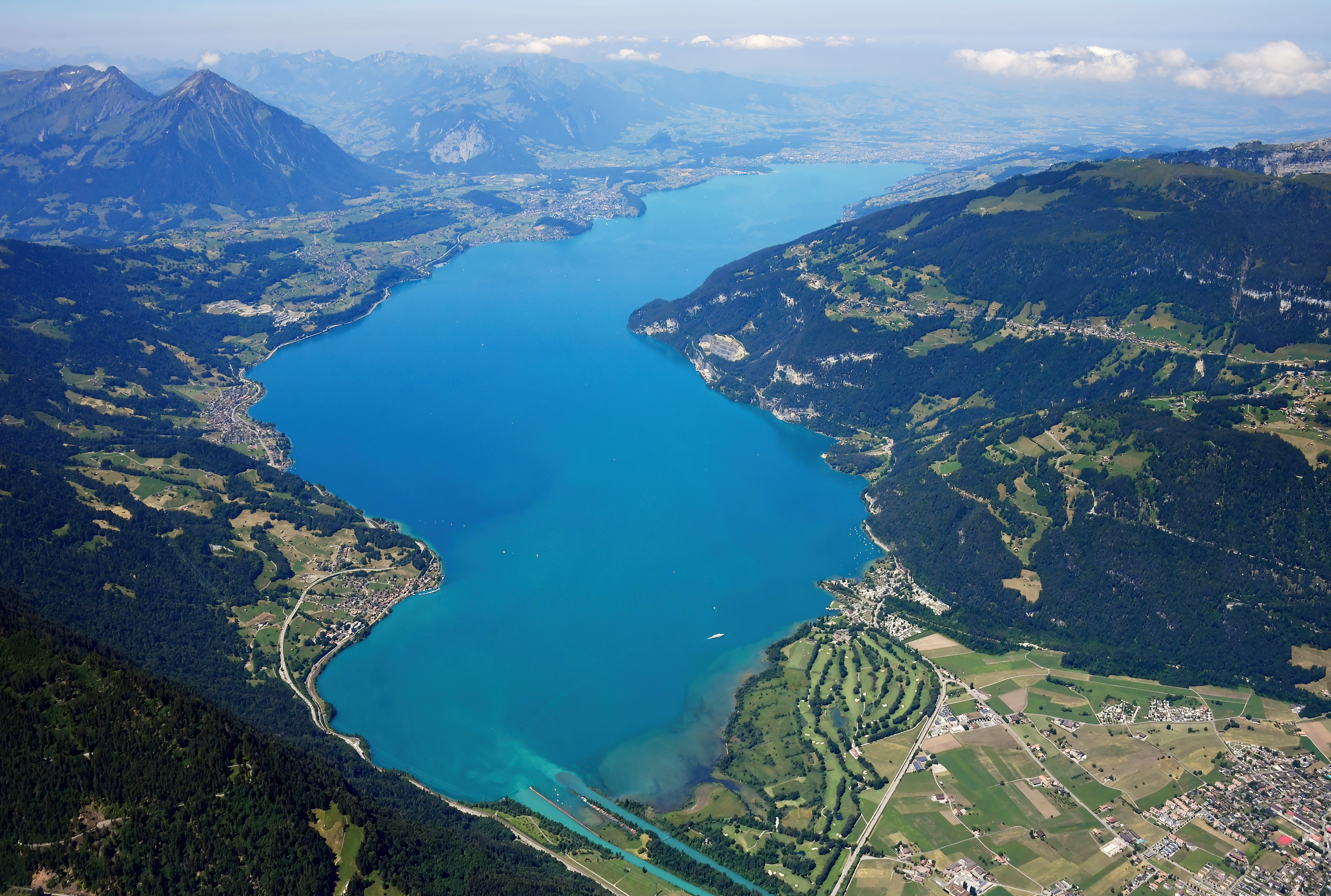
- Aerial view of Lake Thun

- Location within Canton of Bern Location within Switzerland Location within Alps
- Interactive map of Lake Thun; Thunersee
- Location: Canton of Bern
- Coordinates: 46°41′N 7°43′E
- Type: freshwater fjord, recent regulation
- Primary inflows: Aare; Kander
- Primary outflows: Aare
- Catchment area: 2,500 km^{2} (970 sq mi)
- Basin countries: Switzerland
- Max. length: 17.5 km (10.9 mi)
- Max. width: 3.5 km (2.2 mi)
- Surface area: 48.3 km^{2} (18.6 sq mi)
- Average depth: 136 m (446 ft)
- Max. depth: 217 m (712 ft)
- Water volume: 6.5 km^{3} (5,300,000 acre⋅ft)
- Residence time: 684 days
- Surface elevation: 558 m (1,831 ft)
- Settlements: Thun, Spiez, Faulensee

Lake Thun (German: Thunersee, Swiss Standard German pronunciation: [ˈtuːnərˌzeː]) is an Alpine lake in the Bernese Oberland in Switzerland named after the city of Thun, on its northern shore. At 48.3 km^{2} (18.6 sq mi) in surface area, it is the largest Swiss lake entirely within a single canton.

The lake was created after the last glacial period. After the 10th century, it split from Lake Brienz, before which the two lakes were combined, as Wendelsee ("Lake Wendel"). The culminating point of the lake's drainage basin is the Finsteraarhorn at 4,274 metres (14,022 ft) above sea level.

Lake Thun's approximate 2,500 square kilometres (970 sq mi) catchment area frequently causes local flooding after heavy rainfalls. This occurs because the river Aare (German: Aare), which drains Lake Thun, has only limited capacity to handle the excess runoff. The lake is fed by water from Lake Brienz to the southeast, which is 6 metres (20 ft) higher than Lake Thun, and various streams in the Oberland, including the Kander.

In 1835, passenger steamships began operating regularly on the lake. Ten passenger ships, operated by the local railway company BLS AG like Blümlisalp, serve the towns of Interlaken and Thun; the Interlaken ship canal and Thun ship canal connect the lake to Interlaken West railway station and Thun railway station respectively.

Following World War II and up until 1964, the Swiss Government disposed of unused munitions into Lake Thun. The quantity of munitions dumped is reported to be from 3,000 to more than 9,020 tons.

Lake Thun (left) and Lake Brienz on the Swiss National Map (1:25'000)
