= Interlaken ship canal =

Canal in the Swiss canton of Bern

Coordinates: 46.6827°N 7.8506°E

Interlaken Ship Canal
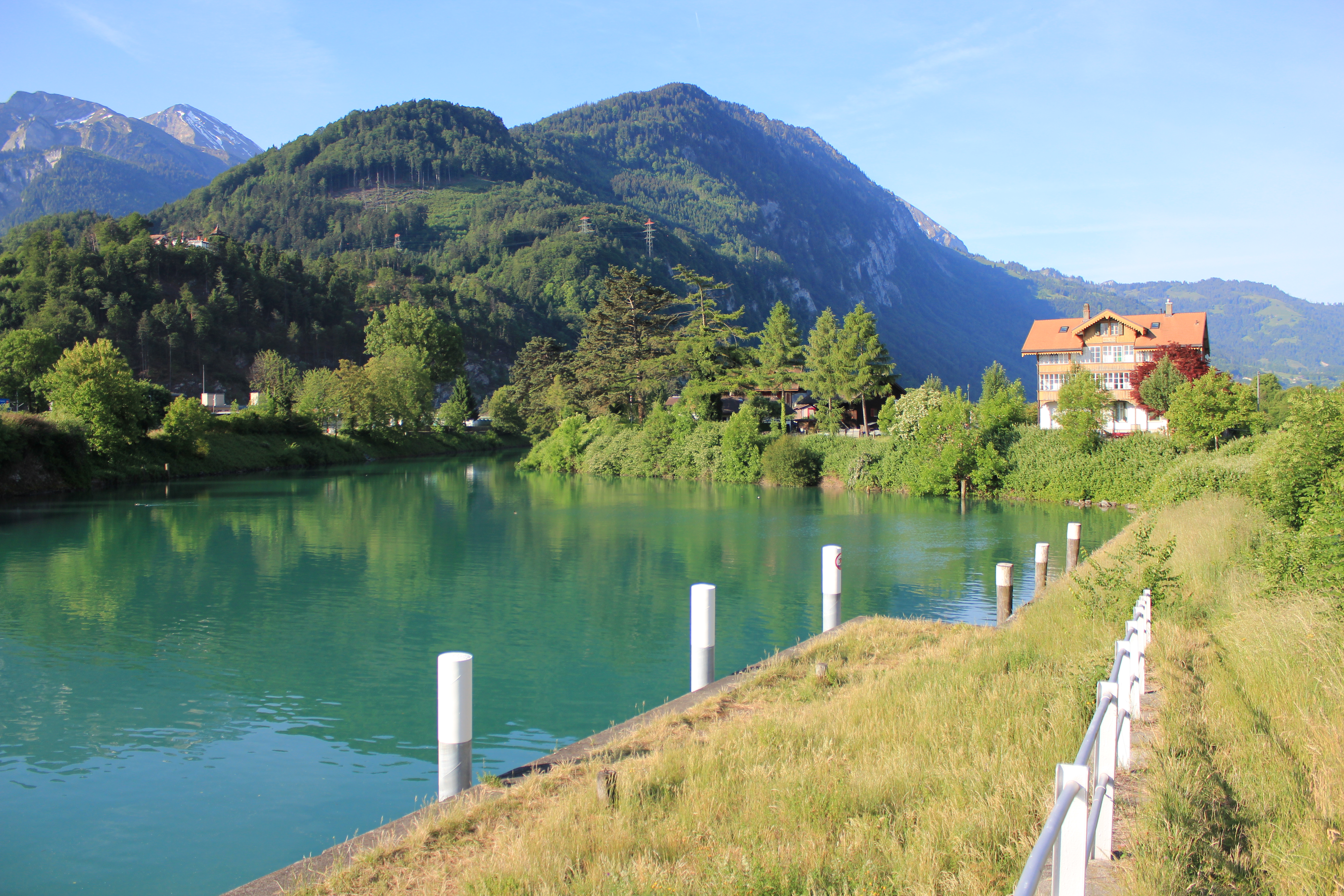
- The turning basin near the head of the Interlaken ship canal

Specifications
- Locks: none
- Status: Navigable

History
- Date completed: 1892

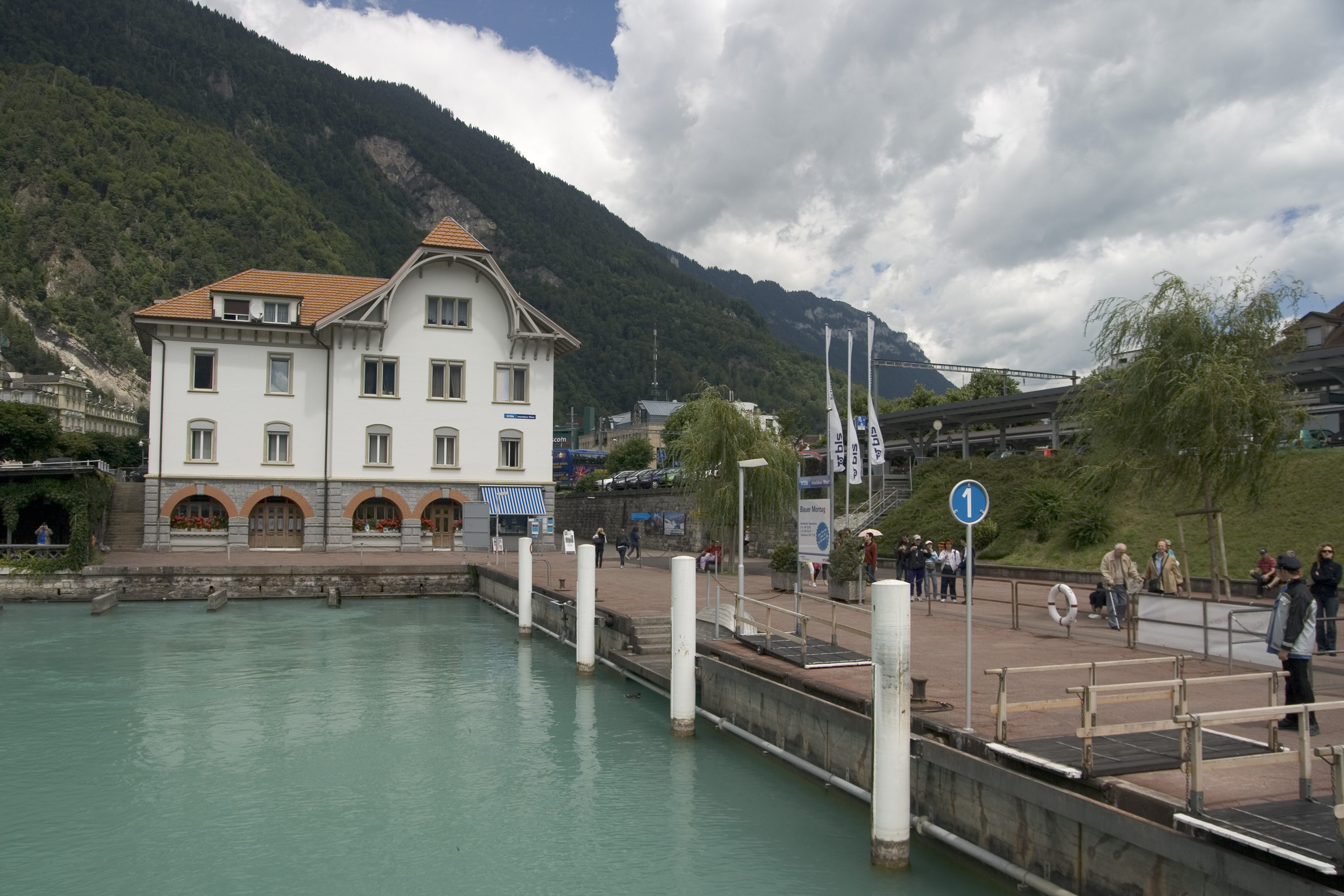
The quay at the head of the Interlaken ship canal. The platforms of Interlaken West station are at a higher level to the right.

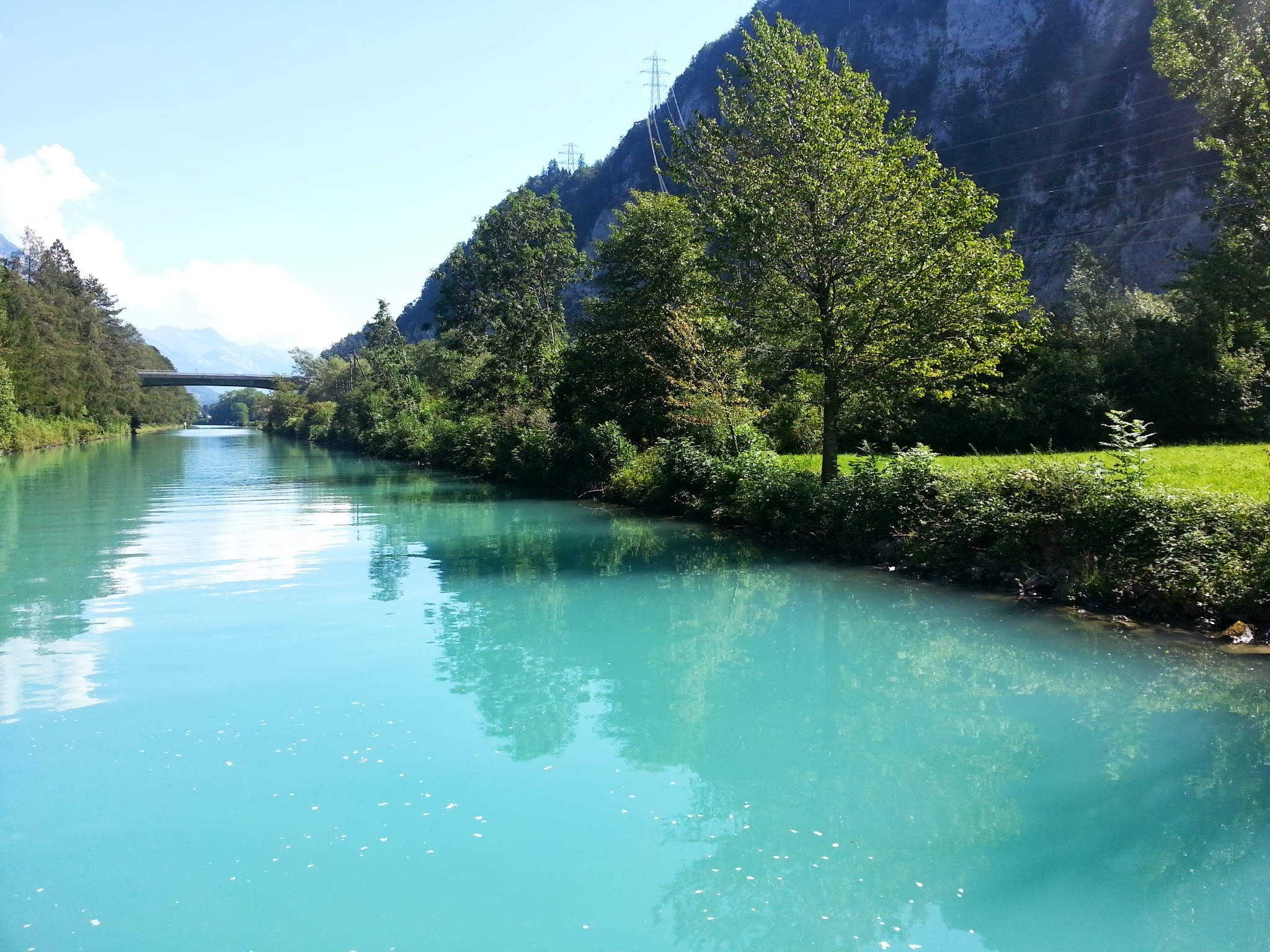
Canal connecting lake Thun with the Interlaken quay / railway station.

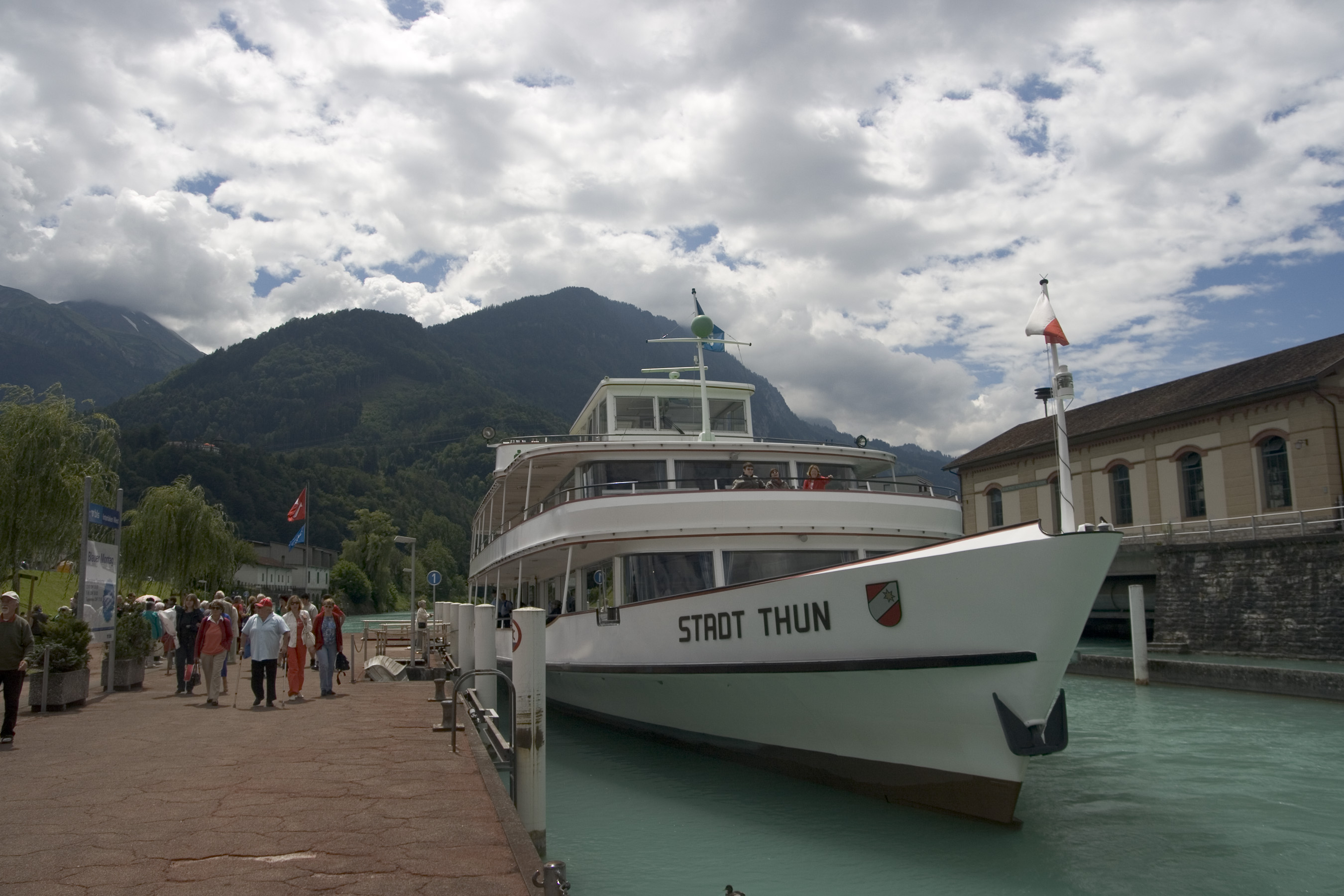
BLS passenger ship Stadt Thun alongside the quay.

The Interlaken ship canal (German: Interlaken Schiffskanal) is a 2.75-kilometre (1.71 mi) long canal in the Swiss canton of Bern. It connects Lake Thun with a quay in the town of Interlaken adjacent to Interlaken West railway station, thus allowing shipping services on the lake to serve the town and connect with railway services. It is still in regular use by the Lake Thun passenger ships of the BLS AG.

The canal parallels the Aar river throughout its length. It has no locks and maintains the same water level as Lake Thun throughout. As a consequence, the water level of the canal at Interlaken West is significantly lower than that of the adjacent river and surrounding land.

At the other side of Interlaken, the uppermost reach of the Interlaken section of the Aar river is used by the Lake Brienz passenger ships of the BLS AG to reach Interlaken Ost railway station. However there is no navigable connection between the two lakes, and in the 5.5 km (3.4 mi) between them the Aar river drops some 6 metres (20 ft), passing over several weirs.

== History ==
Shipping services on Lake Thun date back to at least 1834, when the first steamship was introduced to connect the towns of Thun and Interlaken, at each end of the lake. Interlaken is actually situated on an unnavigable section of the Aar river between Lake Brienz and Lake Thun, and initially services docked at Neuhaus, some 3 km (1.9 mi) away.

In 1872, the Bödelibahn railway was constructed from Därligen, on Lake Thun, to Interlaken, and the Interlaken terminus of the Lake Brienz shipping services was moved to Därligen. However by the 1890s the railway was being extended to connect with Thun and the rest of the Swiss railway network, threatening the shipping services, and the United Steam Navigation Company for Lakes Thun and Brienz (VDG) who operated those services responded by constructing the Interlaken ship canal to allow their vessels to reach the centre of Interlaken. The canal was built between 1890 and 1892.

The VDG merged with the Thunersee railway in 1912. In turn, this new company was taken over by the Bern-Lötschberg-Simplon railway, which eventually became part of BLS AG, the current operators of the lake shipping.
