= Thun ship canal =

Canal in the Swiss canton of Bern

Coordinates: 46.754108°N 7.632279°E

Thun Ship Canal
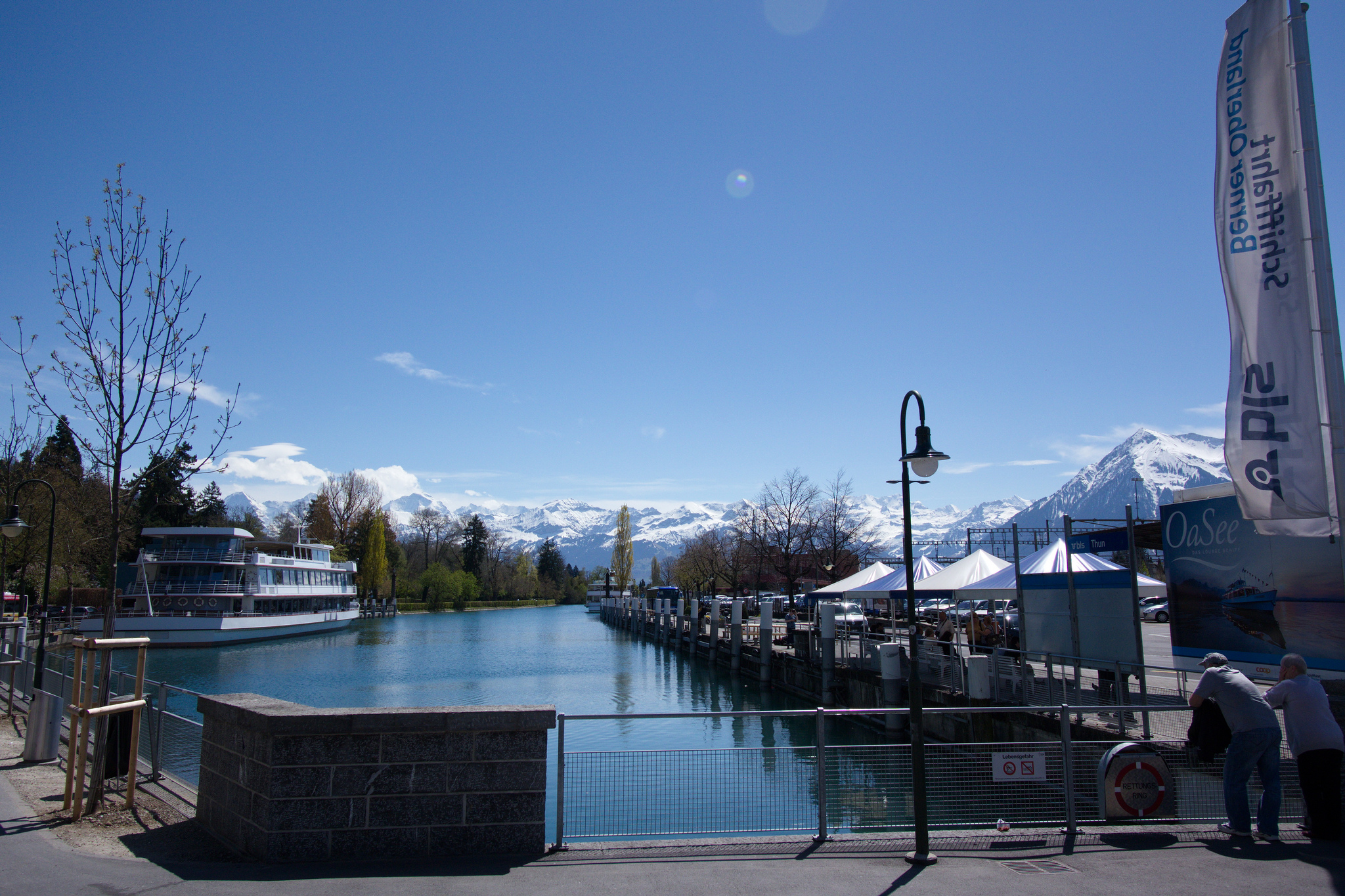
- The quay at Thun railway station

Specifications
- Locks: none
- Status: Navigable

History
- Date completed: 1925

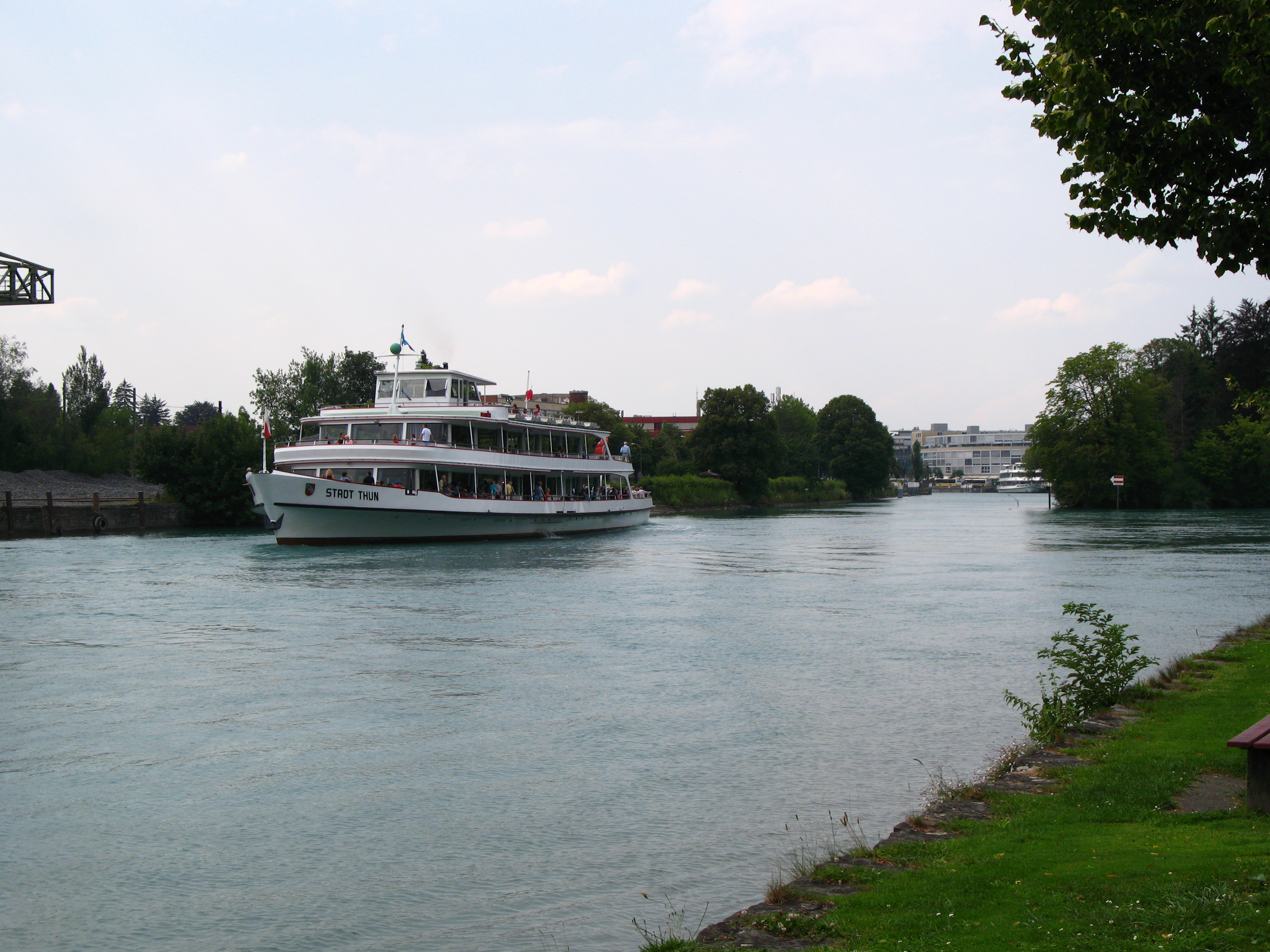
BLS passenger ship Stadt Thun leaving the ship canal.

The Thun ship canal (German: Thuner Schiffskanal) is a 500-metre (1,600 ft) long canal in the Swiss canton of Bern. Together with a navigable reach of the Aare of similar length, it connects Lake Thun with a quay in the town of Thun adjacent to Thun railway station.

The canal allows shipping services on the lake to serve the town and connect with railway services. It is still in regular use by the Lake Thun passenger ships of the BLS AG.

== History ==
Shipping services on Lake Thun date back to at least 1834, when the first steamship was introduced to connect the towns of Thun and Interlaken, at each end of the lake. Originally steamers docked at Scherzligen, and in 1861 the Bern–Thun railway line was extended to a terminal there.

In 1923, the station at Scherzligen was merged with that at Thun to create a new central station. Two years later, in 1925, the ship canal was constructed in order to retain the connection between trains and ships.
