= 1981–82 in Swiss football =

Football in Switzerland
- Season: 1981–82

Men's football
- Nationalliga A: Grasshopper Club
- Nationalliga B: Winterthur
- 1. Liga: 1. Liga champions: FC Laufen; Group 1: Etoile Carouge FC; Group 2: FC Laufen; Group 3: FC Baden; Group 4: FC Schaffhausen
- Swiss Cup: Sion
- Swiss League Cup: Aarau

Women's football
- Swiss Women's Super League: SV Seebach Zürich
- Swiss Cup: DFC Bern

The following is a summary of the 1981–82 season of competitive football in Switzerland.

== Nationalliga A ==
=== League table ===
| Pos | Team | Pld | W | D | L | GF | GA | GD | Pts | Qualification or relegation |
|---|---|---|---|---|---|---|---|---|---|---|
| 1 | Grasshopper Club | 30 | 21 | 7 | 2 | 72 | 24 | +48 | 49 | Swiss champions, qualified for 1982–83 European Cup |
| 2 | Servette | 30 | 20 | 6 | 4 | 76 | 32 | +44 | 46 | Qualified for 1982–83 UEFA Cup |
| 3 | Zürich | 30 | 18 | 10 | 2 | 62 | 25 | +37 | 46 | Qualified for 1982–83 UEFA Cup and entered 1982 Intertoto Cup |
| 4 | Xamax | 30 | 18 | 9 | 3 | 67 | 30 | +37 | 45 | |
| 5 | Young Boys | 30 | 15 | 9 | 6 | 52 | 40 | +12 | 39 | Entered 1982 Intertoto Cup |
| 6 | Sion | 30 | 12 | 7 | 11 | 51 | 46 | +5 | 31 | Swiss Cup winners, qualified for 1982–83 Cup Winners' Cup |
| 7 | Aarau | 30 | 10 | 8 | 12 | 51 | 55 | −4 | 28 | |
| 8 | Basel | 30 | 11 | 6 | 13 | 47 | 51 | −4 | 28 | |
| 9 | Luzern | 30 | 10 | 7 | 13 | 54 | 59 | −5 | 27 | Entered 1982 Intertoto Cup |
| 10 | St. Gallen | 30 | 10 | 5 | 15 | 40 | 45 | −5 | 25 | Entered 1982 Intertoto Cup |
| 11 | Vevey-Sports | 30 | 6 | 11 | 13 | 44 | 57 | −13 | 23 | |
| 12 | Bellinzona | 30 | 7 | 7 | 16 | 34 | 66 | −32 | 21 | |
| 13 | Lausanne-Sport | 30 | 6 | 8 | 16 | 39 | 52 | −13 | 20 | |
| 14 | Bulle | 30 | 5 | 9 | 16 | 29 | 58 | −29 | 19 | |
| 15 | Nordstern Basel | 30 | 6 | 5 | 19 | 29 | 69 | −40 | 17 | Relegated to 1982–83 Nationalliga B |
| 16 | Chiasso | 30 | 4 | 8 | 18 | 25 | 63 | −38 | 16 | Relegated to 1982–83 Nationalliga B |

Source: rsssf.com
Rules for classification: 1) points; 2) goal difference; 3) number of goals scored.

== Nationalliga B ==
=== League table ===
| Pos | Team | Pld | W | D | L | GF | GA | GD | Pts | Promotion or relegation |
|---|---|---|---|---|---|---|---|---|---|---|
| 1 | Winterthur | 30 | 19 | 7 | 4 | 65 | 26 | +39 | 45 | Promoted to 1982–83 Nationalliga A |
| 2 | Wettingen | 30 | 17 | 10 | 3 | 60 | 29 | +31 | 44 | Promoted to 1982–83 Nationalliga A |
| 3 | Chênois | 30 | 16 | 8 | 6 | 52 | 30 | +22 | 40 | |
| 4 | La Chaux-de-Fonds | 30 | 14 | 9 | 7 | 64 | 36 | +28 | 37 | |
| 5 | Grenchen | 30 | 11 | 12 | 7 | 46 | 34 | +12 | 34 | |
| 6 | Mendrisiostar | 30 | 14 | 6 | 10 | 45 | 53 | −8 | 34 | |
| 7 | Lugano | 30 | 11 | 9 | 10 | 55 | 49 | +6 | 31 | |
| 8 | Locarno | 30 | 11 | 8 | 11 | 54 | 40 | +14 | 30 | |
| 9 | Biel-Bienne | 30 | 8 | 14 | 8 | 51 | 47 | +4 | 30 | |
| 10 | Bern | 30 | 9 | 8 | 13 | 45 | 57 | −12 | 26 | |
| 11 | Ibach | 30 | 6 | 13 | 11 | 36 | 47 | −11 | 25 | |
| 12 | Fribourg | 30 | 7 | 10 | 13 | 37 | 47 | −10 | 24 | |
| 13 | Monthey | 30 | 8 | 7 | 15 | 34 | 47 | −13 | 23 | |
| 14 | FC Aurore Bienne | 30 | 7 | 8 | 15 | 26 | 64 | −38 | 22 | Relegated to 1982–83 1. Liga |
| 15 | FC Altstätten (St. Gallen) | 30 | 4 | 12 | 14 | 25 | 56 | −31 | 20 | Relegated to 1982–83 1. Liga |
| 16 | Frauenfeld | 30 | 3 | 9 | 18 | 26 | 59 | −33 | 15 | Relegated to 1982–83 1. Liga |

Source: rsssf.com
Rules for classification: 1) points; 2) goal difference; 3) number of goals scored.

== 1. Liga ==
=== Group 1 ===
| Pos | Team | Pld | W | D | L | GF | GA | GD | Pts | Qualification or relegation |
|---|---|---|---|---|---|---|---|---|---|---|
| 1 | Etoile Carouge FC | 26 | 18 | 2 | 6 | 68 | 31 | +37 | 38 | Play-off to Nationalliga B |
| 2 | Yverdon-Sport FC | 26 | 17 | 2 | 7 | 51 | 32 | +19 | 36 | To decider for second place |
| 3 | FC Renens | 26 | 15 | 6 | 5 | 48 | 35 | +13 | 36 | To decider for second place |
| 4 | FC Martigny-Sports | 26 | 13 | 4 | 9 | 64 | 45 | +19 | 30 | |
| 5 | FC Orbe | 26 | 12 | 5 | 9 | 68 | 59 | +9 | 29 | |
| 6 | FC Boudry | 26 | 12 | 4 | 10 | 44 | 46 | −2 | 28 | |
| 7 | FC Leytron | 26 | 10 | 6 | 10 | 50 | 56 | −6 | 26 | |
| 8 | FC Raron | 26 | 9 | 7 | 10 | 31 | 33 | −2 | 25 | |
| 9 | FC Montreux-Sports | 26 | 10 | 4 | 12 | 40 | 33 | +7 | 24 | |
| 10 | FC Stade Nyonnais | 26 | 9 | 5 | 12 | 38 | 44 | −6 | 23 | |
| 11 | ES FC Malley | 26 | 7 | 7 | 12 | 44 | 58 | −14 | 21 | |
| 12 | FC Stade Lausanne | 26 | 8 | 3 | 15 | 38 | 61 | −23 | 19 | Decider for twelfth place |
| 13 | FC Onex | 26 | 7 | 5 | 14 | 26 | 39 | −13 | 19 | Decider for twelfth place |
| 14 | CS La Tour-de-Peilz | 26 | 4 | 2 | 20 | 39 | 77 | −38 | 10 | Relegation to 2. Liga Interregional |

Source: RSSSF
Rules for classification: 1) Points; 2) Goal difference within the league, but decider play-off for qualifiers.

==== Decider for second place ====
The decider match for second place was played on 26 May in Martigny.

| Team 1 | Score | Team 2 |
|---|---|---|
| Yverdon-Sport FC | 1–0 | FC Renens |

Yverdon-Sport FC win and advance to play-offs. FC Renens remain in the division.

==== Decider for twelfth place ====
The decider match for twelfth was played on 26 May in Nyon.

| Team 1 | Score | Team 2 |
|---|---|---|
| FC Stade Lausanne | 5–1 | FC Onex |

FC Stade Lausanne win and continue in the play-outs. FC Onex are relegated directly to 2. Liga Interregional.

=== Group 2 ===
| Pos | Team | Pld | W | D | L | GF | GA | GD | Pts | Qualification or relegation |
|---|---|---|---|---|---|---|---|---|---|---|
| 1 | FC Laufen | 26 | 16 | 9 | 1 | 50 | 16 | +34 | 41 | Play-off to Nationalliga B |
| 2 | SR Delémont | 26 | 15 | 6 | 5 | 57 | 27 | +30 | 36 | Play-off to Nationalliga B |
| 3 | SC Burgdorf | 26 | 14 | 7 | 5 | 56 | 39 | +17 | 35 | |
| 4 | BSC Old Boys | 26 | 9 | 8 | 9 | 62 | 50 | +12 | 26 | |
| 5 | FC Allschwil | 26 | 7 | 12 | 7 | 31 | 30 | +1 | 26 | |
| 6 | FC Köniz | 26 | 10 | 6 | 10 | 34 | 42 | −8 | 26 | |
| 7 | FC Superga | 26 | 8 | 9 | 9 | 27 | 32 | −5 | 25 | |
| 8 | FC Solothurn | 26 | 10 | 4 | 12 | 38 | 51 | −13 | 24 | |
| 9 | US Boncourt | 26 | 8 | 7 | 11 | 41 | 38 | +3 | 23 | |
| 10 | FC Fétigny | 26 | 8 | 7 | 11 | 32 | 40 | −8 | 23 | |
| 11 | FC Birsfelden | 26 | 9 | 4 | 13 | 34 | 44 | −10 | 22 | |
| 12 | FC Breitenbach | 26 | 5 | 11 | 10 | 29 | 35 | −6 | 21 | Play-out against relegation |
| 13 | FC Estavayer-le-Lac | 26 | 7 | 6 | 13 | 43 | 67 | −24 | 20 | Relegation to 2. Liga Interregional |
| 14 | SC Derendingen | 26 | 5 | 6 | 15 | 27 | 50 | −23 | 16 | Relegation to 2. Liga Interregional |

Source: RSSSF
Rules for classification: 1) Points; 2) Goal difference within the league, but decider play-off for qualifiers.

=== Group 3 ===
| Pos | Team | Pld | W | D | L | GF | GA | GD | Pts | Qualification or relegation |
|---|---|---|---|---|---|---|---|---|---|---|
| 1 | FC Baden | 26 | 14 | 6 | 6 | 56 | 30 | +26 | 34 | Play-off to Nationalliga B |
| 2 | SC Zug | 26 | 15 | 4 | 7 | 53 | 28 | +25 | 34 | Play-off to Nationalliga B |
| 3 | FC Emmenbrücke | 26 | 15 | 3 | 8 | 52 | 33 | +19 | 33 | |
| 4 | FC Sursee | 26 | 9 | 11 | 6 | 34 | 36 | −2 | 29 | |
| 5 | SC Kriens | 26 | 11 | 6 | 9 | 44 | 37 | +7 | 28 | |
| 6 | FC Emmen | 26 | 11 | 6 | 9 | 51 | 48 | +3 | 28 | |
| 7 | FC Suhr | 26 | 9 | 9 | 8 | 33 | 29 | +4 | 27 | |
| 8 | FC Zug | 26 | 10 | 6 | 10 | 44 | 38 | +6 | 26 | |
| 9 | FC Olten | 26 | 9 | 8 | 9 | 44 | 42 | +2 | 26 | |
| 10 | FC Oberentfelden | 26 | 8 | 8 | 10 | 32 | 40 | −8 | 24 | |
| 11 | US Giubiasco | 26 | 6 | 9 | 11 | 36 | 41 | −5 | 21 | |
| 12 | SC Buochs | 26 | 9 | 3 | 14 | 31 | 45 | −14 | 21 | Play-out against relegation |
| 13 | Morobbia Giubiasco | 26 | 7 | 6 | 13 | 34 | 59 | −25 | 20 | Relegation to 2. Liga Interregional |
| 14 | FC Buchs (AG) | 26 | 4 | 5 | 17 | 26 | 64 | −38 | 13 | Relegation to 2. Liga Interregional |

Source: RSSSF
Rules for classification: 1) Points; 2) Goal difference within the league, but decider play-off for qualifiers.

=== Group 4 ===
| Pos | Team | Pld | W | D | L | GF | GA | GD | Pts | Qualification or relegation |
|---|---|---|---|---|---|---|---|---|---|---|
| 1 | FC Schaffhausen | 26 | 15 | 6 | 5 | 49 | 21 | +28 | 36 | Play-off to Nationalliga B |
| 2 | FC Red Star Zürich | 26 | 13 | 8 | 5 | 52 | 30 | +22 | 34 | To decider for second place |
| 3 | FC Rüti | 26 | 11 | 12 | 3 | 46 | 30 | +16 | 34 | To decider for second place |
| 4 | FC Kreuzlingen | 26 | 11 | 8 | 7 | 36 | 31 | +5 | 30 | |
| 5 | FC Balzers | 26 | 10 | 7 | 9 | 31 | 22 | +9 | 27 | |
| 6 | FC Blue Stars Zürich | 26 | 12 | 3 | 11 | 31 | 33 | −2 | 27 | |
| 7 | FC Turicum | 26 | 9 | 7 | 10 | 37 | 36 | +1 | 25 | |
| 8 | FC Brüttisellen | 26 | 10 | 5 | 11 | 43 | 47 | −4 | 25 | |
| 9 | FC Vaduz | 26 | 10 | 5 | 11 | 40 | 47 | −7 | 25 | |
| 10 | FC Küsnacht | 26 | 7 | 9 | 10 | 28 | 36 | −8 | 23 | |
| 11 | FC Uzwil | 26 | 5 | 10 | 11 | 23 | 39 | −16 | 20 | |
| 12 | FC Young Fellows Zürich | 26 | 9 | 2 | 15 | 38 | 58 | −20 | 20 | Play-out against relegation |
| 13 | FC Gossau | 26 | 5 | 9 | 12 | 41 | 51 | −10 | 19 | Relegation to 2. Liga Interregional |
| 14 | FC Stäfa | 26 | 5 | 9 | 12 | 28 | 42 | −14 | 19 | Relegation to 2. Liga Interregional |

Source: RSSSF
Rules for classification: 1) Points; 2) Goal difference within the league, but decider play-off for qualifiers.

==== Decider for second place ====
The decider match for second place was played on 26 May in Wallisellen

| Team 1 | Score | Team 2 |
|---|---|---|
| FC Rüti | 2–1 a.e.t. | FC Blue Stars Zürich |

FC Rüti win and advance to play-offs. FC Blue Stars Zürich remain in the division.

=== Promotion play-off ===
==== Qualification round ====
| Team 1 | Score | Team 2 |
|---|---|---|
| SC Zug | 1–1 | FC Laufen |
| FC Laufen | 0–0 | SC Zug |

FC Laufen win on away goals and continue to the finals.

| Team 1 | Score | Team 2 |
|---|---|---|
| FC Baden | 3–1 | Yverdon-Sport FC |
| Yverdon-Sport FC | 0–2 | FC Baden |

FC Baden win 5–1 on aggregate and continue to the finals.

| Team 1 | Score | Team 2 |
|---|---|---|
| FC Rüti | 0–0 | Etoile Carouge FC |
| Etoile Carouge FC | 3–4 | FC Rüti |

FC Rüti win 4–3 on aggregate and continue to the finals.

| Team 1 | Score | Team 2 |
|---|---|---|
| FC Schaffhausen | 1–1 | SR Delémont |
| SR Delémont | 0–0 | FC Schaffhausen |

SR Delémont win on away goals and continue to the finals.

==== Final round ====
| Team 1 | Score | Team 2 |
|---|---|---|
| FC Laufen | 3–1 | SR Delémont |
| SR Delémont | 0–0 | FC Laufen |

FC Laufen win 3–1 on aggregate and are promoted to 1982–83 Nationalliga B.

| Team 1 | Score | Team 2 |
|---|---|---|
| FC Baden | 1–0 | FC Rüti |
| FC Rüti | 1–0 | FC Baden |
| FC Baden | 1–0 | FC Rüti |

FC Baden win the replay and are promoted to 1982–83 Nationalliga B.

==== Decider for third place ====
| Team 1 | Score | Team 2 |
|---|---|---|
| FC Rüti | 3–1 | SR Delémont |
| SR Delémont | 1–1 | FC Rüti |

FC Rüti win 4–2 on aggregate and are promoted to 1982–83 Nationalliga B. SR Delémont remain in 1. Liga.

==== Decider for 1. Liga championship ====
| Team 1 | Score | Team 2 |
|---|---|---|
| FC Laufen | 3–1 | FC Baden |

FC Laufen win and are 1. Liga champions.

=== Relegation play-out ===
==== First round ====
| Team 1 | Score | Team 2 |
|---|---|---|
| FC Breitenbach | 3–1 | FC Stade Lausanne |
| FC Stade Lausanne | 3–0 | FC Breitenbach |

FC Stade Lausanne win 4–3 on aggregate and remain in division. FC Breitenbach continue to the final.

| Team 1 | Score | Team 2 |
|---|---|---|
| SC Buochs | 1–1 | FC Young Fellows Zürich |
| FC Young Fellows Zürich | 0–3 | SC Buochs |

SC Buochs win 4–1 on aggregate and remain in division. FC Young Fellows Zürich continue to the final.

==== Final round ====
| Team 1 | Score | Team 2 |
|---|---|---|
| FC Young Fellows Zürich | 0–2 | FC Breitenbach |
| FC Breitenbach | 2–1 | FC Young Fellows Zürich |

FC Breitenbach win 4–1 on aggregate and remain in division. FC Young Fellows Zürich are relegated to 2. Liga.

== Swiss Cup ==
=== Early rounds ===
The routes of the finalists to the final were:

- Round 3: Monthey-Sion 0:1. Sursee-Basel 1:9.
- Round 4: Sion-Servette 3:2 n.V. Bellinzona-Basel 0:1.
- Round 5: Sion-Winterthur 3:1. Aarau-Basel 2:3.
- Quarter-finals: Sion-Wettingen 2:0. Basel-Lausanne 2:1.
- Semi-finals: Sion-YB 2:0. Basel-Delémont 3:0.

=== Final ===
31 May 1982
14:30
Final

| Sion | 1 – 0 | Basel |
|---|---|---|
| Balet 23' (1:0); Bregy (yellow card) 59' | Summary | (yellow card) 63' Lüthi |

Wankdorf Stadium, Bern
Attendance: 44,000
Referee: (Switzerland) Jean-Marie Macheret

== Swiss League Cup ==
=== Early rounds ===
The routes of the finalists to the final were:

- Round 1: Bern-Aarau 1:2. Zürich-St. Gallen 0:1
- Round 2: Aarau-GC 4:3 a.e.t. St. Gallen-Mendrisiostar 4:2
- Quarter-finals: Aarau-Basel 1:0. Servette-St. Gallen 1:2
- Semi-finals: Aarau-Luzern 4:1. St. Gallen-Winterthur 1:1 a.e.t. 4:3 penalties.

=== Final ===
18 May 1982
First leg

| St. Gallen | 0–1 | Aarau |
|---|---|---|
| | summary | 75' Rietmann |

Espenmoos, St. Gallen
Attendance: 1,800
Referee: Gottlieb Barmettler (Luzern)

29 May 1982
Second leg

| Aarau | 0–0 | St. Gallen |
|---|---|---|
| | summary |

Stadion Brügglifeld, Aarau
Attendance: 5,700
Referee: Alfred Heinis (Biberist)

== Swiss Clubs in Europe ==
- Zürich as 1980–81 Nationalliga A champions: 1981–82 European Cup and entered 1981 Intertoto Cup
- Lausanne-Sport as 1980–81 Swiss Cup winners: 1981–82 Cup Winners' Cup
- Grasshopper Club as league runners-up: 1981–82 UEFA Cup and entered 1981 Intertoto Cup
- Xamax as league third placed team: 1981–82 UEFA Cup
- Young Boys entered: 1981 Intertoto Cup
- Luzern entered: 1981 Intertoto Cup

=== Zürich ===
==== European Cup ====
===== First round =====
| 16 September 1981 First leg | BFC Dynamo (East Germany) | 2–0 | (Switzerland) Zürich | Friedrich-Ludwig-Jahn-Stadion, East Berlin |
| | Schulz 53'; Riediger 59' | Report | | Attendance: 28,000; Referee: Enzo Barbaresco (Italy) |

| 30 September 1981 Second leg | Zürich (Switzerland) | 3–1 | (East Germany) BFC Dynamo | Letzigrund, Zürich |
| | Jerković 2', 22', 87' | Report | Ullrich 47' | Attendance: 7,800; Referee: César Correia (Portugal) |

3–3 on aggregate; BFC Dynamo won on away goals.

==== Intertoto Cup ====
===== Group 3 =====
| 27 June 1981 Round 1 | Malmö FF (Sweden) | 2–1 | (Switzerland) Zürich | Malmö Stadion, Malmö |
| | Palmér 29' (1:0); Nilsson 45' (2:0) | FCZ summary | 80' (2:1) Moser; (yellow card) Iselin; (yellow card) Zappa | Attendance: 2,042; Referee: (Sweden) Ingemar Johansson |

| 4 July 1981 Round 2 | Werder Bremen (West Germany) | 3–1 | (Switzerland) Zürich | Wilhelmshaven |
| | Reinders 12' (1:1); Kostedde 35' (2:1); Reinders 40' (3:1); Reinders (penalty missed) 66′ | FCZ summary | 6' (0:1) Erba | Attendance: 4,000; Referee: (West Germany) Dieter Pauly |

| 11 July 1981 Round 3 | Zürich (Switzerland) | 3–0 | (Bulgaria) Spartak Pleven | Kestenholz |
| | Zwicker 26' (1:0); Kurz 60' (2:0); Landolt 65' (3:0) | FCZ summary | | Attendance: 800; Referee: (Switzerland) Georges Sandoz (Corcelles-Cormondrèche, Neuchâtel) |

| 18 July 1981 Round 4 | Zürich (Switzerland) | 0–0 | (Sweden) Malmö FF | Sportplatz Thal, Kloten |
| | | FCZ summary | | Attendance: 900; Referee: (Switzerland) Rudolf Renggli (Luzern) |
Note: Inauguration of the Thal sports field

| 25 July 1981 Round 5 | Spartak Pleven (Bulgaria) | 4–1 | (Switzerland) Zürich | Pleven |
| | Getov 4' (1:0); Lazarev 31' (2:0); Todorov 41' (3:0); Milkov 56' (4:0) | FCZ summary | 68' (4:1) Erba | Attendance: 2,500; Referee: (Bulgaria) Čončev |

| 2 August 1981 Round 6 | Zürich (Switzerland) | 1–5 | (West Germany) Werder Bremen | Sportplatz im Moos, Rüschlikon |
| | Zappa 12' (1:0) | FCZ summary | 23' (pen. 1:1) Reinders; 37' (1:2) Meier; 67' (1:3) Reinders; 75' (1:4) Otten; 78' (1:5) Rautiainen | Attendance: 1,450; Referee: (Switzerland) André Daina (Éclépens) |

| Pos | Team | Pld | W | D | L | GF | GA | GD | Pts | BRE | MAL | SPL | ZÜR |
|---|---|---|---|---|---|---|---|---|---|---|---|---|---|
| 1 | (West Germany) Werder Bremen | 6 | 5 | 1 | 0 | 15 | 6 | +9 | 11 | — | 1–0 | 1–0 | 3–1 |
| 2 | (Sweden) Malmö FF | 6 | 2 | 2 | 2 | 7 | 7 | 0 | 6 | 2–2 | — | 3–1 | 2–1 |
| 3 | (Bulgaria) Spartak Pleven | 6 | 2 | 0 | 4 | 9 | 11 | −2 | 4 | 2–3 | 2–0 | — | 4–1 |
| 4 | (Switzerland) Zürich | 6 | 1 | 1 | 4 | 7 | 14 | −7 | 3 | 1–5 | 0–0 | 3–0 | — |

Source: mogiel.net
Rules for classification: 1) Points; 2) Goal difference; 3) Goals scored; 4) Head-to-head points; 5) Away goals scored; 6) Draw.

=== Lausanne ===
==== Cup Winners' Cup ====
===== First round =====
| 16 September 1981 First leg | Lausanne-Sport (Switzerland) | 2–1 | (Sweden) Kalmar | Stade olympique de la Pontaise, Lausanne |
| | Parietti 7'; Kok 82' | Report | Magnusson 35' | Attendance: 6,400 |

| 30 September 1981 Second leg | Kalmar (Sweden) | 3–2 | (Switzerland) Lausanne-Sport | Fredriksskans, Kalmar |
| | Persson 10'; Ohlsson-Nordenhem 35'; Ryf 42' (o.g.) | Report | Parietti 15'; Kok 62' | Attendance: 3,654 |

4–4 on aggregate; Lausanne won on away goals.

===== Second round =====
| 21 October 1981 First leg | Legia Warsaw (Poland) | 2–1 | (Switzerland) Lausanne-Sport | Stadion Wojska Polskiego, Warsaw |
| | Adamczyk 8'; Baran 32' | Report | Kok 22' | Attendance: 12,000 |

| 4 November 1981 Second leg | Lausanne-Sport (Switzerland) | 1–1 | (Poland) Legia Warsaw | Stade olympique de la Pontaise, Lausanne |
| | Lei-Ravello 85' | Report | Baran 48' | Attendance: 10,000 |

Legia Warsaw won 3–2 on aggregate.

=== GC ===
==== UEFA Cup ====
===== First round =====
| 16 September 1981 First leg | Grasshopper Club (Switzerland) | 1–0 | (England) West Bromwich Albion | Hardturm, Zürich |
| 20:00 | Fimian 39' | | | Referee: Franz Wöhrer (Austria) |

| 30 September 1981 Second leg | West Bromwich Albion (England) | 1–3 | (Switzerland) Grasshopper Club | The Hawthorns, West Bromwich |
| 19:30 | Robertson 49' | | Fimian 11'; Koller 15'; Jara 74' | Referee: Günter Linn (West Germany) |

Grasshoppers won 4–1 on aggregate.

===== Second round =====
| 21 October 1981 First leg | Grasshopper Club (Switzerland) | 2–0 | (Socialist Federal Republic of Yugoslavia) Radnički Niš | Hardturm, Zürich |
| | Jara 17'; Sulser 78' (pen.) | | | Referee: Emmanuel Platopoulos (Greece) |

| 4 November 1981 Second leg | Radnički Niš (Socialist Federal Republic of Yugoslavia) | 2–0 (a.e.t.) (3–0 p) | (Switzerland) Grasshopper Club | Niš |
| 13:30 | Đorđević 39' (pen.); Savić 65' | | | Stadium: Čair Stadium; Referee: Dušan Krchnak (Czechoslovakia) |

2–2 on aggregate; Radnički Niš won 3–0 on penalties.

==== Intertoto Cup ====
===== Group 7 =====
| Pos | Team | Pld | W | D | L | GF | GA | GD | Pts | GÖT | HER | B05 | GCZ |
|---|---|---|---|---|---|---|---|---|---|---|---|---|---|
| 1 | (Sweden) IFK Göteborg | 6 | 5 | 0 | 1 | 12 | 6 | +6 | 10 | — | 1–0 | 2–1 | 2–1 |
| 2 | (West Germany) Hertha Berlin | 6 | 4 | 0 | 2 | 12 | 6 | +6 | 8 | 1–2 | — | 2–0 | 5–1 |
| 3 | (Czechoslovakia) Bohemians Prague | 6 | 3 | 0 | 3 | 10 | 8 | +2 | 6 | 2–1 | 1–2 | — | 3–1 |
| 4 | (Switzerland) Grasshopper Club | 6 | 0 | 0 | 6 | 5 | 19 | −14 | 0 | 1–4 | 1–2 | 0–3 | — |

Source: mogiel.net
Rules for classification: 1) Points; 2) Goal difference; 3) Goals scored; 4) Head-to-head points; 5) Away goals scored; 6) Draw.

=== Xamax ===
==== UEFA Cup ====
===== First round =====
| 15 September 1981 First leg | Neuchâtel Xamax (Switzerland) | 4–0 | (Czechoslovakia) Sparta Prague | Stade de la Maladière, Neuchâtel |
| 20:00 | Lüthi 8', 80'; Pellegrini 22'; Trinchero 30' (pen.) | | | Attendance: 13,000; Referee: Luigi Angolin (Italy) |

| 29 September 1981 Second leg | Sparta Prague (Czechoslovakia) | 3–2 | (Switzerland) Neuchâtel Xamax | Stadion Letná, Prague |
| 17:00 | Chovanec 51'; Straka 72' (pen.); Kotal 84' | | Trinchero 24' (pen.); Lüthi 41' | Referee: Heinz Fahnler (Austria) |

Neuchâtel Xamax won 6–3 on aggregate.

===== Second round =====
| 21 October 1981 First leg | Malmö FF (Sweden) | 0–1 | (Switzerland) Neuchâtel Xamax | Malmö IP, Malmö |
| 19:00 | | | Pellegrini 9' | Referee: Juhani Smolander (Finland) |

| 3 November 1981 Second leg | Neuchâtel Xamax (Switzerland) | 1–0 | (Sweden) Malmö FF | Stade de la Maladière, Neuchâtel |
| 20:00 | Pellegrini 58' | | | Referee: Augusto Marques Pires (Portugal) |

Neuchâtel Xamax won 2–0 on aggregate.

===== Third round =====
| 25 November 1981 First leg | Sporting CP (Portugal) | 0–0 | (Switzerland) Neuchâtel Xamax | Estádio José Alvalade, Lisbon |
| | | | | Attendance: 42,500; Referee: Siegfried Kirschen (East Germany) |

| 9 December 1981 Second leg | Neuchâtel Xamax (Switzerland) | 1–0 | (Portugal) Sporting CP | Stade de la Maladière, Neuchâtel |
| 20:00 | Andrey 27' | | | Attendance: 17,187; Referee: Bogdan Dochev (Bulgaria) |

Neuchâtel Xamax won 1–0 on aggregate.

===== Quarter-finals =====
| 3 March 1982 First leg | Hamburger SV (West Germany) | 3–2 | (Switzerland) Neuchâtel Xamax | Volksparkstadion, Hamburg |
| 20:00 | Bastrup 32'; Memering 71'; Von Heesen 75' | | Givens 36'; Lüthi 52' | Referee: Anders Mattsson (Finland) |

| 17 March 1982 Second leg | Neuchâtel Xamax (Switzerland) | 0–0 | (West Germany) Hamburger SV | Stade de la Maladière, Neuchâtel |
| 20:00 | | | | Referee: Alojzy Jarguz (Poland) |

Hamburger SV won 3–2 on aggregate.

=== Young Boys ===
==== Intertoto Cup ====
===== Group 6 =====
| Pos | Team | Pld | W | D | L | GF | GA | GD | Pts | MOL | BRY | SPA | YB |
|---|---|---|---|---|---|---|---|---|---|---|---|---|---|
| 1 | (Belgium) Molenbeek | 6 | 3 | 2 | 1 | 10 | 7 | +3 | 8 | — | 2–1 | 2–2 | 3–1 |
| 2 | (Norway) Bryne | 6 | 2 | 2 | 2 | 5 | 6 | −1 | 6 | 0–0 | — | 0–3 | 0–0 |
| 3 | (Czechoslovakia) Sparta Prague | 6 | 2 | 1 | 3 | 8 | 8 | 0 | 5 | 3–2 | 0–2 | — | 0–1 |
| 4 | (Switzerland) Young Boys | 6 | 2 | 1 | 3 | 4 | 6 | −2 | 5 | 0–1 | 1–2 | 1–0 | — |

Source: mogiel.net
Rules for classification: 1) Points; 2) Goal difference; 3) Goals scored; 4) Head-to-head points; 5) Away goals scored; 6) Draw.

=== Luzern ===
==== Intertoto Cup ====
===== Group 9 =====
| Pos | Team | Pld | W | D | L | GF | GA | GD | Pts | CHE | ANT | NÆS | LUZ |
|---|---|---|---|---|---|---|---|---|---|---|---|---|---|
| 1 | (Czechoslovakia) Cheb | 6 | 3 | 2 | 1 | 15 | 9 | +6 | 8 | — | 2–0 | 1–1 | 6–0 |
| 2 | (Belgium) Royal Antwerp | 6 | 3 | 1 | 2 | 12 | 7 | +5 | 7 | 4–1 | — | 0–1 | 2–2 |
| 3 | (Denmark) Næstved | 6 | 3 | 1 | 2 | 7 | 8 | −1 | 7 | 2–3 | 0–3 | — | 1–0 |
| 4 | (Switzerland) Luzern | 6 | 0 | 2 | 4 | 6 | 16 | −10 | 2 | 2–2 | 1–3 | 1–2 | — |

Source: mogiel.net
Rules for classification: 1) Points; 2) Goal difference; 3) Goals scored; 4) Head-to-head points; 5) Away goals scored; 6) Draw.

== Sources ==
- Switzerland 1981–82 at RSSSF
- Cup finals at Fussball-Schweiz
- European Competitions 1981–82 at RSSSF.com
- Intertoto history at Pawel Mogielnicki's Page
- Josef Zindel (2018). FC Basel 1893. Die ersten 125 Jahre (in German). Basel: Friedrich Reinhardt Verlag. ISBN 978-3-7245-2305-5.

| Preceded by 1980–81 | Seasons in Swiss football | Succeeded by 1982–83 |
