= 1980–81 in Swiss football =

Football in Switzerland
- Season: 1980–81

Men's football
- Nationalliga A: Zürich
- Nationalliga B: Vevey-Sports
- 1. Liga: 1. Liga champions: FC Ibach; Group 1: FC Monthey; Group 2: FC Aurore Bienne; Group 3: FC Emmenbrücke; Group 4: FC Locarno
- Swiss Cup: Lausanne-Sport
- Swiss League Cup: Zürich

Women's football
- Swiss Women's Super League: SV Seebach Zürich
- Swiss Cup: SV Seebach Zürich

The following is a summary of the 1980–81 season of competitive football in Switzerland.

== Nationalliga A ==
=== Final league table ===
Pos	Team	Pld	W	D	L	GF	GA	GD	Pts	Qualification
1	Zürich	26	18	4	4	57	28	+29	40	Champions, qualified for 1981–82 European Cup and entered 1981 Intertoto Cup
2	Grasshopper Club	26	11	12	3	45	24	+21	34	qualified for 1981–82 UEFA Cup and entered 1981 Intertoto Cup
3	Xamax	26	14	6	6	44	25	+19	34	qualified for 1981–82 UEFA Cup
4	Young Boys	26	11	11	4	46	33	+13	33	entered 1981 Intertoto Cup
5	Lausanne-Sport	26	12	6	8	40	29	+11	30	Swiss Cup winners, qualified for 1981–82 Cup Winners' Cup
6	Basel	26	9	10	7	48	44	+4	28	
7	Servette	26	8	10	8	38	36	+2	26	
8	Sion	26	8	8	10	35	42	−7	24	
9	Luzern	26	6	10	10	39	46	−7	22	entered 1981 Intertoto Cup
10	St. Gallen	26	7	8	11	35	42	−7	22	
11	Nordstern Basel	26	6	7	13	28	37	−9	19	
12	Bellinzona	26	7	5	14	25	46	−21	19	
13	Chiasso	26	5	8	13	28	46	−18	18	
14	Chênois	26	3	9	14	23	53	−30	15	Relegated to 1981–82 Nationalliga B

Source: rsssf.com
Rules for classification: 1) points; 2) goal difference; 3) number of goals scored.

== Nationalliga B ==
=== League table ===
Pos	Team	Pld	W	D	L	GF	GA	GD	Pts	Qualification or relegation
1	Vevey-Sports	26	14	8	4	59	29	+30	50	NLB Champions promoted to 1981–82 Nationalliga A
2	FC Aarau	26	14	7	5	55	37	+18	49	Promoted to 1981–82 Nationalliga A
3	FC Bulle	26	13	8	5	45	30	+15	47	Promoted to 1981–82 Nationalliga A
4	FC Wettingen	26	11	11	4	45	25	+20	44	
5	FC Frauenfeld	26	11	9	6	47	29	+18	42	
6	FC Bern	26	8	10	8	43	40	+3	34	
7	FC Fribourg	26	7	11	8	24	33	−9	32	
8	FC Winterthur	26	9	6	11	40	47	−7	33	
9	FC Grenchen	26	10	3	13	32	42	−10	33	
10	Lugano	26	6	10	10	42	56	−14	28	
11	FC Biel-Bienne	26	8	5	13	41	52	−11	29	
12	FC La Chaux-de-Fonds	26	6	7	13	24	37	−13	25	
13	Mendrisiostar	26	6	6	14	23	35	−12	24	
14	SC Kriens	26	4	9	13	31	59	−28	21	Relegated to 1981–82 1. Liga

Source: rsssf.com
Rules for classification: 1) points; 2) goal difference; 3) number of goals scored.

== 1. Liga ==
=== Group 1 ===
Pos	Team	Pld	W	D	L	GF	GA	GD	Pts	Qualification or relegation
1	FC Monthey	26	20	4	2	57	17	+40	44	Play-off to Nationalliga B
2	FC Stade Lausanne	26	12	7	7	54	43	+11	31	Play-off to Nationalliga B
3	Etoile Carouge FC	26	11	8	7	54	39	+15	30	
4	FC Renens	26	10	9	7	47	35	+12	29	
5	FC Orbe	26	11	6	9	61	58	+3	28	
6	FC Martigny-Sports	26	11	5	10	46	42	+4	27	
7	FC Montreux-Sports	26	10	4	12	46	45	+1	24	
8	FC Raron	26	7	10	9	28	30	−2	24	
9	ES FC Malley	26	8	7	11	35	44	−9	23	
10	FC Fétigny	26	8	7	11	38	53	−15	23	
11	FC Leytron	26	7	8	11	42	55	−13	22	
12	FC Stade Nyonnais	26	7	7	12	37	49	−12	21	
13	FC Concordia Lausanne	26	7	5	14	50	66	−16	19	Relegation to 2. Liga Interregional
14	Central Fribourg	26	7	5	14	43	62	−19	19	Relegation to 2. Liga Interregional

Source: RSSSF
Rules for classification: 1) Points; 2) Goal difference within the league, but decider play-off for qualifiers.

=== Group 2 ===
Pos	Team	Pld	W	D	L	GF	GA	GD	Pts	Qualification or relegation
1	FC Aurore Bienne	26	13	8	5	54	29	+25	34	Play-off to Nationalliga B
2	FC Birsfelden	26	12	9	5	34	26	+8	33	Play-off to Nationalliga B
3	SR Delémont	26	12	8	6	39	24	+15	32	
4	FC Laufen	26	11	9	6	39	26	+13	31	
5	FC Breitenbach	26	12	7	7	32	28	+4	31	
6	FC Köniz	26	10	8	8	41	44	−3	28	
7	FC Superga	26	9	9	8	33	31	+2	27	
8	FC Boudry	26	9	6	11	34	40	−6	24	
9	SC Derendingen	26	8	7	11	31	36	−5	23	
10	FC Solothurn	26	8	6	12	40	47	−7	22	
11	FC Allschwil	26	6	10	10	33	40	−7	22	
12	US Boncourt	26	5	12	9	33	43	−10	22	
13	SV Muttenz	26	8	4	14	38	41	−3	20	Relegation to 2. Liga Interregional
14	SC Binningen	26	4	7	15	25	51	−26	15	Relegation to 2. Liga Interregional

Source: RSSSF
Rules for classification: 1) Points; 2) Goal difference within the league, but decider play-off for qualifiers.

=== Group 3 ===
Pos	Team	Pld	W	D	L	GF	GA	GD	Pts	Qualification or relegation
1	FC Emmenbrücke	26	14	6	6	60	37	+23	34	Play-off to Nationalliga B
2	FC Ibach	26	12	10	4	38	20	+18	34	Play-off to Nationalliga B
3	SC Zug	26	11	11	4	52	32	+20	33	
4	FC Sursee	26	12	8	6	42	35	+7	32	
5	SC Buochs	26	9	9	8	45	37	+8	27	
6	FC Oberentfelden	26	9	9	8	37	41	−4	27	
7	FC Suhr	26	11	4	11	41	48	−7	26	
8	FC Baden	26	8	9	9	34	35	−1	25	
9	SC Burgdorf	26	8	7	11	32	36	−4	23	
10	FC Emmen	26	6	11	9	39	47	−8	23	
11	FC Blue Stars Zürich	26	6	10	10	31	40	−9	22	
12	SC Young Fellows	26	7	8	11	29	44	−15	22	
13	FC Herzogenbuchsee	26	5	8	13	27	42	−15	18	Relegation to 2. Liga Interregional
14	FC Lerchenfeld	26	6	6	14	37	50	−13	18	Relegation to 2. Liga Interregional

Source: RSSSF
Rules for classification: 1) Points; 2) Goal difference within the league, but decider play-off for qualifiers.

=== Group 4 ===
Pos	Team	Pld	W	D	L	GF	GA	GD	Pts	Qualification or relegation
1	FC Locarno	26	17	5	4	63	28	+35	39	Play-off to Nationalliga B
2	FC Altstätten (St. Gallen)	26	14	9	3	40	21	+19	37	Play-off to Nationalliga B
3	FC Vaduz	26	15	4	7	52	35	+17	34	
4	FC Schaffhausen	26	12	7	7	37	25	+12	31	
5	FC Gossau	26	14	2	10	52	41	+11	30	
6	FC Balzers	26	10	7	9	46	35	+11	27	
7	FC Küsnacht	26	8	11	7	25	23	+2	27	
8	FC Rüti	26	10	5	11	32	35	−3	25	
9	FC Turicum	26	8	9	9	31	39	−8	25	
10	FC Uzwil	26	8	7	11	42	48	−6	23	
11	FC Stäfa	26	4	11	11	21	33	−12	19	
12	US Morobbia Giubiasco	26	7	4	15	30	55	−25	18	
13	FC Morbio	26	3	11	12	27	42	−15	17	Relegation to 2. Liga Interregional
14	FC Bad Ragaz	26	5	2	19	27	65	−38	12	Relegation to 2. Liga Interregional

Source: RSSSF
Rules for classification: 1) Points; 2) Goal difference within the league, but decider play-off for qualifiers.

=== Promotion round ===
==== Group West ====
Pos	Team	Pld	W	D	L	GF	GA	GD	Pts	Qualification or relegation
1	FC Monthey	6	4	2	0	11	6	+5	10	Promotion to 1981–82 Nationalliga B
2	FC Aurore Bienne	6	4	1	1	13	6	+7	9	Promotion to 1981–82 Nationalliga B
3	FC Stade Lausanne	6	2	1	3	21	16	+5	5	Qualification for decider
4	FC Birsfelden	6	0	0	6	3	20	−17	0	

Source: RSSSF
Rules for classification: 1) Points; 2) Goal difference within the league, but decider play-off for qualifiers.

==== Group East ====
Pos	Team	Pld	W	D	L	GF	GA	GD	Pts	Qualification or relegation
1	FC Ibach	6	3	1	2	9	5	+4	7	Promotion to 1981–82 Nationalliga B
2	FC Locarno	6	2	2	2	10	8	+2	6	To decider for second place
3	FC Altstätten (St. Gallen)	6	2	2	2	9	12	−3	6	To decider for second place
4	FC Emmenbrücke	6	2	1	3	8	11	−3	5	

Source: RSSSF
Rules for classification: 1) Points; 2) Goal difference within the league, but decider play-off for qualifiers.

===== Decider for second place in group East =====
The decider match for second group place was played on 29 June in Näfels

Team 1	Score	Team 2
FC Locarno	2–1	FC Altstätten

FC Locarno win and are promoted to 1981–82 Nationalliga B. FC Altstätten continue to decider for fifth position.

==== Decider for fifth league position ====
The decider matches for fifth promotion place were played on 28 June and 1 July.

Team 1	Score	Team 2
FC Altstätten	3–0	FC Stade Lausanne
FC Stade Lausanne	0–1	FC Altstätten

FC Altstätten win and are promoted to 1981–82 Nationalliga B. FC Stade Lausanne remain in the division.

==== Decider for 1. Liga championship ====
The championship decider was played on 28 June in Ibach.

Team 1	Score	Team 2
FC Ibach	1–0	FC Monthey

FC Ibach win and are 1. Liga champions.

== Swiss Cup ==
=== Early rounds ===
The routes of the finalists to the final were:

- Round 3: Lengnau-Lausanne 0:1. Frauenfeld-Zürich 2:4.
- Round 4: Lausanne-Luzern 1:0. Bulle-Zürich 0:5.
- Quarter-finals: Nordstern Basel-Lausanne 2:2 (a.e.t.). replay: Lausanne-Nordstern 3:1. Zürich-Basel 3:0.
- Semi-finals: Lausanne-GC 1:1 (a.e.t.). replay: GC-Lausanne 1:3. Sion-Zürich 0:0 (a.e.t.). replay: Zürich-Sion 4:0.

=== Final ===
Whit Monday 8 June 1981
Final

Lausanne-Sport	4–3 (a.e.t.)	Zürich
Raczinsky (yellow card) 4'; Kok 47'; Mauron 65'; Crescenzi 97'; Crescenzi 99'	Report	38' Lüdi; 52' (pen.) Zappa; (yellow card) 76' Zappa; (red card) 98' Iselin; 107' Peterhans; (yellow card) 116' Lüdi

Wankdorf Stadium, Bern
Attendance: 40,000
Referee: (Switzerland) Jakob Baumann (Schaffhausen)

== Swiss League Cup ==
=== Early rounds ===
The routes of the finalists to the final were:

- Round 1: Basel-Zürich 1:2. Lausanne-Sports-Xamax 4:0.
- Round 2: Chiasso-Zürich 0:2. Lausanne-Sports-FC La Chaux-de-Fonds 3:0.
- Quarter-finals: Servette-Zürich 1:2. Lausanne-Sports-Winterthur 1:0.
- Semi-finals: Zürich-St. Gallen 3:1. Lausanne-Sports-Sion 3:1.

=== Final ===
26 May 1981
First leg

Lausanne-Sport (Switzerland)	1–2	Zürich
Tachet 52'	Summary	21' Zwicker; 36' Peterhans

Olympique de la Pontaise, Lausanne
Attendance: 4,200
Referee: (Switzerland) Alfred Heinis (Ammannsegg)

8 September 1981
Second leg

Zürich	0–0	Lausanne-Sport
	Summary

Letzigrund, Zürich
Attendance: 1,050
Referee: (Switzerland) Othmar Winter (Martigny)

Note: The return match of the final could not be played until September 1981 due to scheduling problems. Zürich won 2–1 on aggregate

== Swiss Clubs in Europe ==
- Basel as 1979–80 Nationalliga A champions: 1980–81 European Cup
- Sion as 1979–80 Swiss Cup winners: 1980–81 Cup Winners' Cup and entered 1980 Intertoto Cup
- Grasshopper Club: as league runners-up: 1980–81 UEFA Cup
- Servette: as league third placed team: 1980–81 UEFA Cup
- St. Gallen: entered 1980 Intertoto Cup
- Young Boys: entered 1980 Intertoto Cup
- Xamax: entered 1980 Intertoto Cup

=== Basel ===
==== European Cup ====
===== First round =====
17 September 1980 First leg	Club Brugge (Belgium)	0 – 1	(Switzerland) Basel	Jan Breydel Stadium, Bruges
20:00		UEFA summary FCB summary	(yellow card) 55' Schleiffer; 65' Maissen	Attendance: 20,000; Referee: (Austria) Adolf Mathias

1 October 1980 Second leg	Basel (Switzerland)	4 – 1	(Belgium) Club Brugge	St. Jakob Stadium, Basel
20:00	Marti (yellow card) 3'; Tanner 14'; Stohler 48' (pen.) von Wartburg 55'; Geisser 81'	UEFA summary FCB summary	4' Ceulemans; (yellow card) 12' Meeuws; (red card) 17' Barth (Goalkeeper); (yellow card) 44' Leekens	Attendance: 22,500; Referee: (Spain) Ángel Franco Martínez

Basel won 5–1 on aggregate.

===== Second round =====
22 October 1980 First leg	Basel (Switzerland)	1 – 0	(Socialist Federal Republic of Yugoslavia) Red Star Belgrade	St. Jakob Stadium, Basel
20:00	Lauscher 33'; Tanner (yellow card) 35'	UEFA summary FCB Summary	(yellow card) 22' Jurišić; (yellow card) 50' Janković	Attendance: 30,500; Referee: (Portugal) António Garrido

5 November 1980 Second leg	Red Star Belgrade (Socialist Federal Republic of Yugoslavia)	2 – 0	(Switzerland) Basel	Red Star Stadium, Belgrade
17:00	Repčić 6'; Janjanin 18'; Rajković (yellow card) 68'; Blagojević (yellow card) 87'	UEFA summary FCB summary		Attendance: 75,000 - 80,000; Referee: (England) John Carpenter

Red Star Belgrade won 2–1 on aggregate.

=== Sion ===
==== Cup Winners' Cup ====
===== First round =====
17 September 1980 First leg	Sion (Switzerland)	1–1	(Norway) Haugar	Stade Tourbillon, Sion
	Brigger 65'	summary	41' Osborne	Attendance: 6,000; Referee: (Netherlands) Johannes Peters

28 September 1980 Second leg	Haugar (Norway)	2–0	(Switzerland) Sion	Haugesund Stadion, Haugesund
	Nilsen 40'; Christophersen 47' (pen.)	summary		Attendance: 4,238; Referee: (Denmark) Erik Steen Jensen

Haugar won 3–1 on aggregate.

==== Intertoto Cup ====
===== Group 7 =====
Pos	Team	Pld	W	D	L	GF	GA	GD	Pts	MAL	DUI	WIL	SIO
1	(Sweden) Malmö FF	6	5	0	1	15	8	+7	10	—	4–1	1–0	2–0
2	(West Germany) Duisburg	6	4	0	2	15	11	+4	8	4–2	—	1–3	6–2
3	(Netherlands) Willem II	6	2	1	3	8	9	−1	5	1–2	0–2	—	4–3
4	(Switzerland) Sion	6	0	1	5	7	17	−10	1	2–4	0–1	0–0	—

Source: mogiel.net
Rules for classification: 1) Points; 2) Goal difference; 3) Goals scored; 4) Head-to-head points; 5) Away goals scored; 6) Draw.

=== Grasshopper Club ===
==== UEFA Cup ====
===== First round =====
17 September 1980 First leg	Grasshopper Club (Switzerland)	3–1	(Denmark) KB	Hardturm, Zürich
	Meyer 19', 53', 55'	Report	Eigenbrod 67'	Attendance: 4,200; Referee: Adolf Prokop (East Germany)

1 October 1980 Second leg	KB (Denmark)	2–5	(Switzerland) Grasshopper Club	Frederiksberg Idrætspark, Frederiksberg
	Fosgaard 29'; Tune-Hansen 86'	report	Hermann 51', 60', 75'; Zanetti 57'; Sulser 77'	Referee: Martti Hirviniemi (Finland)

Grasshopper won 8–3 on aggregate.

===== Second round =====
22 October 1980 First leg	Porto (Portugal)	2–0	(Switzerland) Grasshopper Club	Estádio das Antas, Porto
	Teixeira 36'; Sousa 54'	report		Attendance: 35,000; Referee: Egbert Mulder (Netherlands)

5 November 1980 Second leg	Grasshopper Club (Switzerland)	3–0 (a.e.t.)	(Portugal) Porto	Hardturm, Zürich
	Sulser 26'; Wehrli 66'; Pfister 118'	report		Attendance: 8,100; Referee: Bogdan Dochev (Bulgaria)

Grasshoppers won 3–2 on aggregate.

===== Third round =====
26 November 1980 First leg	Grasshopper Club (Switzerland)	2–1	(Italy) Torino	Hardturm, Zürich
	Hermann 52'; Koller 53'	report	Sclosa 49'	Referee: Vojtech Christov (Czechoslovakia)

10 December 1980 Second leg	Torino (Italy)	2 – 1 (a.e.t.) (3–4 p)	(Switzerland) Grasshopper Club	Stadio Delle Alpi, Turin
	Graziani 62'; Pulici 63'	report	Terraneo 28' (o.g.)	Referee: Károly Palotai (Hungary)
	Penalties
	D'Amico (penalty scored); Sclosa (penalty scored); Graziani (penalty scored); Zaccarelli (penalty missed); Pecci (penalty missed)		(penalty scored) Heinz Hermann; (penalty scored) Egli; (penalty scored) Sulser; (penalty scored) Hächler

3–3 on aggregate; Grasshoppers won 4–3 on penalties.

===== Quarter-finals =====
4 March 1981 First leg	Grasshopper Club (Switzerland)	0–0	(France) Sochaux	Hardturm, Zürich
		Report		Attendance: 17,000; Referee: Eldar Azimzade (Soviet Union)

18 March 1981 Second leg	Sochaux (France)	2–1	(Switzerland) Grasshopper Club	Stade Auguste Bonal, Montbéliard
	Durkalić 24'; Genghini 84'	Report	Koller 10'	Attendance: 13,453; Referee: Jan Redelfs (West Germany)

Sochaux won 2–1 on aggregate.

=== St. Gallen ===
==== Intertoto Cup ====
===== Group 4 =====
Pos	Team	Pld	W	D	L	GF	GA	GD	Pts	SPA	ADO	STG	RWI
1	(Czechoslovakia) Sparta Prague	6	5	0	1	8	3	+5	10	—	2–1	1–0	1–0
2	(Netherlands) Den Haag	6	3	0	3	7	10	−3	6	2–1	—	1–4	1–0
3	(Switzerland) St. Gallen	6	2	0	4	10	9	+1	4	0–2	3–0	—	1–2
4	(Austria) Rapid Wien	6	2	0	4	5	8	−3	4	0–1	0–2	3–2	—

Source: mogiel.net
Rules for classification: 1) Points; 2) Goal difference; 3) Goals scored; 4) Head-to-head points; 5) Away goals scored; 6) Draw.

=== Young Boys ===
==== Intertoto Cup ====
===== Group 6 =====
Pos	Team	Pld	W	D	L	GF	GA	GD	Pts	HAL	BRA	LNZ	YB
1	(Sweden) Halmstad	6	3	3	0	12	6	+6	9	—	1–1	0–0	4–2
2	(Czechoslovakia) Inter Bratislava	6	2	3	1	11	8	+3	7	0–3	—	2–2	3–0
3	(Austria) VOEST Linz	6	2	3	1	9	7	+2	7	2–3	2–2	—	2–0
4	(Switzerland) Young Boys	6	0	1	5	3	14	−11	1	1–1	0–3	0–1	—

Source: mogiel.net
Rules for classification: 1) Points; 2) Goal difference; 3) Goals scored; 4) Head-to-head points; 5) Away goals scored; 6) Draw.

=== Xamax ===
==== Intertoto Cup ====
===== Group 1 =====
Pos	Team	Pld	W	D	L	GF	GA	GD	Pts	STA	DÜS	NEU	RJC
1	(Belgium) Standard Liège	6	4	2	0	17	8	+9	10	—	5–1	2–2	4–1
2	(West Germany) Fortuna Düsseldorf	6	2	2	2	12	17	−5	6	3–3	—	1–5	3–1
3	(Switzerland) Neuchâtel Xamax	6	1	3	2	13	11	+2	5	0–1	2–2	—	3–3
4	(Netherlands) Roda JC	6	1	1	4	9	15	−6	3	1–2	1–2	2–1	—

Source: mogiel.net
Rules for classification: 1) Points; 2) Goal difference; 3) Goals scored; 4) Head-to-head points; 5) Away goals scored; 6) Draw.

== Sources ==
- Switzerland 1980–81 at RSSSF
- League Cup finals at RSSSF
- European Competitions 1980–81 at RSSSF
- Cup finals at Fussball-Schweiz
- Intertoto history at Pawel Mogielnicki's Page
- Josef Zindel (2018). FC Basel 1893. Die ersten 125 Jahre (in German). Basel: Friedrich Reinhardt Verlag. ISBN 978-3-7245-2305-5.

Preceded by 1979–80	Seasons in Swiss football	Succeeded by 1981–82
