= 1980–81 Swiss League Cup =

Tournament details
- Country: Switzerland
- Teams: 32

Final positions
- Champions: Zürich
- Runners-up: Lausanne-Sport

Tournament statistics
- Matches played: 32

The 1980–81 Swiss League Cup was the ninth edition of the Swiss League Cup competition since its introduction in 1972. The first round was played in summer 1980 as a pre-season warm-up to the 1980–81 Swiss football season, round two was played in November and the later rounds were played after the winter-break.

== Overview ==
The League Cup had been created eight years earlier to allow clubs from the top two tiers to compete in a tournament in advance of the league season, with the semi-finals and final played in the Autumn. However, this planning had been given up and modified. This season the modifications continued, the first round was played in advance of the season, the second was played the first week-end in November and the later rounds were played in the spring. The final was to be played, for the first time, as a two legged affair with both finalists playing a home and an away game.

The matches were played in a single knockout format. In the event of a draw after 90 minutes, the match went into extra time. In the event of a draw at the end of extra time, a penalty shoot-out was to decide which team qualified for the next round. No replays were foreseen.

== First round ==
=== Summary ===
| Team 1 | Score | Team 2 |
|---|---|---|
16 August 1980
| Aarau | 2–3 (a.e.t.) | Nordstern Basel |
| Basel | 1–2 | Zürich |
| Bellinzona | 2–3 | Chiasso |
| FC Bern | 0–4 | St. Gallen |
| Bulle | 2–5 | La Chaux-de-Fonds |
| Chênois | 3–2 | Biel-Bienne |
| Fribourg | 1–4 | Sion |
| Grenchen | 0–2 | Young Boys |
| Kriens | 0–2 | Luzern |
| Lausanne-Sport | 4–0 | Xamax |
| Wettingen | 1–4 | Grasshopper Club |
| Winterthur | 3–1 | Frauenfeld |
| FC Aurore Bienne | 0–1 | Vevey-Sports |
17 August 1980
| FC Ibach | 1–1 (a.e.t.) (4–3 p) | Lugano |
| Montreux-Sports | 0–5 | Servette |
| FC Sursee | 4–3 (a.e.t.) | Mendrisiostar |

=== Matches ===
16 August 1980

| Aarau | 2–3 (a.e.t.) | Nordstern Basel |
|---|---|---|
| (Ries) 91' (og 1:1); Merlo 103' (2:2) | FCA summary | 86' (0:1) Mata; 92' (1:2) Mata; Ries 106' (2:3) |

Stadion Brügglifeld, Aarau
Attendance: 700
Referee: (Switzerland) Alfred Heinis (Ammannsegg, Biberist)

16 August 1980
17:00

| Basel | 1–2 | Zürich |
|---|---|---|
| Lauscher 86' (1:2) | FCB summary FCZ summary | 15' (0:1) Lüdi; (yellow card) 18' Moser; 56' (0:2) Zwicker |

Stadion Schützenmatte, Basel
Attendance: 2,500
Referee: (Switzerland) Jakob Baumann (Schaffhausen)

16 August 1980

| Grenchen | 0–2 | Young Boys |
|---|---|---|
| | YB summary | 10' (0:1) Müller; (penalty missed) 71′ Berkemeier; 85' (0:2) Berkemeier |

Stadion Brühl, Grenchen
Attendance: 1,250
Referee: (Switzerland) Aschwanden

16 August 1980

| Wettingen | 1–4 | Grasshopper Club |
|---|---|---|
| Traber (1:4) | RSSSF summary | 28' (0:1) Pfister; 64' (0:2) Egli; 81' (0:3) Sulser; 85' (0:4) Egli |

Stadion Altenburg, Wettingen
Referee: (Switzerland) Marino Paggiola

17 August 1980

| Montreux-Sports | 0–5 | Servette |
|---|---|---|
| | Servette summary | (0:1) Radi (0:2) Mustapha (0:3) Zwygart (0:4) Sarrasin (0:5) Matthey |

Stade de Chailly, Montreux

== Second round ==
=== Summary ===
| Team 1 | Score | Team 2 |
|---|---|---|
1 November 1980
| Chiasso | 0–2 | Zürich |
| Grasshopper Club | 3–2 | FC Ibach |
| Nordstern Basel | 1–3 (a.e.t.) | Servette |
| Chênois | 2–0 | Vevey-Sports |
| Young Boys | 1–4 | Sion |
| Luzern | 3–4 | Winterthur |
| Lausanne-Sport | 3–0 | La Chaux-de-Fonds |
| FC Sursee | 2–2 (a.e.t.) (6–7 p) | St. Gallen |

=== Matches ===
1 November 1980

| Chiasso | 0–2 | Zürich |
|---|---|---|
| Riva (yellow card) 15' | FCZ summary | 60' (0:1) Landolt; 85' (0:2) Seiler |

Referee: (Switzerland)

1 November 1980

| Grasshopper Club | 3–2 | FC Ibach |
|---|---|---|
| Koller 16' (1:0); Pfister 31' (2:0); Sulser 36' (3:0) | RSSSF summary | 83' (3:1) Heinzer; 87' (3:2) Reichlin |

Hardturm, Zürich
Attendance: 1,650
Referee: (Switzerland) Jakob Baumann (Schaffhausen)

2 November 1980

| Nordstern Basel | 1–3 (a.e.t.) | Servette |
|---|---|---|
| Zeender 5' (1:0) | Servette summary | 52' (1:1) Mustapha; 100' (1:2) Verheecke; 106' (1:3) Cucinotta |

Stadion Rankhof, Basel
Attendance: 1,100
Referee: (Switzerland) Gottlieb Barmettler (Luzern)

2 November 1980

| Young Boys | 1–4 | Sion |
|---|---|---|
| Sprunger 51' (1:1) | YB summary | 9' (0:1) Brigger; 66' (1:2) Balet; 72' (1:3) Bregy; 77' (1:4) Isoz |

Wankdorf Stadium, Bern
Attendance: 2,500
Referee: (Switzerland) Bruno Galler (Kirchdorf, Bern)

== Quarter-finals ==
=== Summary ===
| Team 1 | Score | Team 2 |
|---|---|---|
17 March 1981
| Servette | 1–2 | Zürich |
28 March 1981
| Sion | 4–1 | Grasshopper Club |
29 March 1981
| St. Gallen | 3–2 | Chênois |
1 April 1981
| Lausanne-Sport | 1–0 | Winterthur |

=== Matches ===
17 March 1981
20:00

| Servette | 1–2 | Zürich |
|---|---|---|
| Mustapha 82' (1:2) | FCZ summary Servette summary | 68' (0:1) Peterhans; (yellow card) 75' Kundert; 76' (0:2) Seiler |

Charmilles Stadium, Geneva
Attendance: 2,500
Referee: (Switzerland) Georges Sandoz (Corcelles-Cormondrèche, Neuchâtel)

28 March 1981
17:30

| Sion | 4–1 | Grasshopper Club |
|---|---|---|
| Saunier 10' (1:0); Geiger 28' (2:0); Richard 47' (pen.); Brigger 60' (4:1) | RSSSF summary | 37' (2:1) Sulser |

Stade Tourbillon, Sion
Attendance: 3,000
Referee: (Switzerland) Bruno Galler (Kirchdorf, Bern)

29 March 1981
14:30

| St. Gallen | 3–2 | Chênois |
|---|---|---|
| Graf 48' (1:1); Bauer 65' (2:1); Graf 74' (3:1) | RSSSF summary | 24' (0:1) Gacesa; 77' (3:2) Rufli |

Espenmoos, St. Gallen
Attendance: 2,500
Referee: (Switzerland) Ulrich Nyffenegger (Nidau)

1 April 1981
20:00

| Lausanne-Sport | 1–0 | Winterthur |
|---|---|---|
| Mauron 46' (1:0) | RSSSF summary | (yellow card) Schweizer; (yellow card) Käser |

Olympique de la Pontaise, Lausanne
Attendance: 1,200
Referee: (Switzerland) Joseph Meier

== Semi-finals ==
=== Summary ===
| Team 1 | Score | Team 2 |
|---|---|---|
20 May 1981
| Lausanne-Sport | 3–1 | Sion |
| Zürich | 3–1 | St. Gallen |

=== Matches ===
20 May 1981
20:30

| Lausanne-Sport | 3–1 | Sion |
|---|---|---|
| Tachet 2' (pen. 1:0); Diserens 51' (2:1); Mauron 56' (3:1) | RSSSF summary | 35' (1:1) Saunier |

Olympique de la Pontaise, Lausanne
Attendance: 3,400
Referee: (Switzerland) Bruno Burgener (Kriens)

20 May 1981
20:00

| Zürich | 3–0 | St. Gallen |
|---|---|---|
| Kurz 7' (1:0); Zappa 55' (pen. 2:0); Zappa 70' (3:0) | FCZ summary |

Letzigrund, Zürich
Attendance: 1,750
Referee: (Switzerland) Philippe Mercier (Pully)

== Final ==
The final was held with the first leg on 26 May at the Olympique de la Pontaise in Lausanne. The return round was held on 8 September 1981 at the Letzigrund in Zürich.

=== Summary ===
First leg

| Team 1 | Score | Team 2 |
|---|---|---|
26 May 1981
| Lausanne-Sport | 1–2 | Zürich |

Second leg

| Team 1 | Score | Team 2 |
|---|---|---|
8 September 1981
| Zürich | 0–0 | Lausanne-Sport |

Zürich won 2–1 on aggrigate.

=== Telegram ===
26 May 1981
20:00
First leg

| Lausanne-Sport | 1–2 | Zürich |
|---|---|---|
| Tachet 52' (1:2) | FCZ summary | 21' (0:1) Zwicker; (red card) 27' Erba; 36' (0:2) Peterhans |

Olympique de la Pontaise, Lausanne
Attendance: 4,200
Referee: (Switzerland) Alfred Heinis (Ammannsegg, Biberist)

8 September 1981
20:00
Second leg

| Zürich | 0–0 | Lausanne-Sport |
|---|---|---|
| | FCZ summary | (yellow card) 72' Lei-Ravello |

Letzigrund, Zürich
Attendance: 1,050
Referee: (Switzerland) Othmar Winter (Martigny)

Zürich won the cup winning the final 2–1 on aggrigate. This was the club's first League Cup title.

== Further in Swiss football ==
- 1980–81 Nationalliga A
- 1980–81 Swiss 1. Liga
- 1980–81 Swiss Cup
