= 1981 Intertoto Cup =

Tournament details
- Teams: 36

Final positions
- Champions: Group winners Wiener Sport-Club; Standard Liège; SV Werder Bremen; FK Budućnost Podgorica; Aarhus Gymnastikforening; R.W.D. Molenbeek (1909); IFK Göteborg; Stuttgarter Kickers; FK Hvězda Cheb

Tournament statistics
- Matches played: 108

In the 1981 Intertoto Cup no knock-out rounds were contested, and therefore no winner was declared.

== Group stage ==
The teams were divided into nine groups of four teams each.

=== Group 1 ===
Pos	Team	Pld	W	D	L	GF	GA	GD	Pts	WSC	LIÈ	MNE	HTA
1	(Austria) Wiener Sport-Club	6	4	1	1	12	7	+5	9	—	3–1	2–0	3–1
2	(Belgium) RFC Liège	6	3	1	2	13	10	+3	7	3–0	—	3–2	4–1
3	(Israel) Maccabi Netanya	6	2	2	2	11	9	+2	6	1–1	3–1	—	1–1
4	(Israel) Hapoel Tel Aviv	6	0	2	4	6	16	−10	2	1–3	1–1	1–4	—

Source: mogiel.net
Rules for classification: 1) Points; 2) Goal difference; 3) Goals scored; 4) Head-to-head points; 5) Away goals scored; 6) Draw.

=== Group 2 ===
Pos	Team	Pld	W	D	L	GF	GA	GD	Pts	STA	KB	STU	DUI
1	(Belgium) Standard Liège	6	3	3	0	12	3	+9	9	—	4–0	4–1	2–0
2	(Denmark) KB	6	2	2	2	6	8	−2	6	1–1	—	0–1	1–1
3	(Austria) Sturm Graz	6	1	3	2	6	9	−3	5	1–1	1–2	—	1–1
4	(West Germany) Duisburg	6	0	4	2	3	7	−4	4	0–0	0–2	1–1	—

Source: mogiel.net
Rules for classification: 1) Points; 2) Goal difference; 3) Goals scored; 4) Head-to-head points; 5) Away goals scored; 6) Draw.

=== Group 3 ===
Pos	Team	Pld	W	D	L	GF	GA	GD	Pts	BRE	MAL	SPL	ZÜR
1	(West Germany) Werder Bremen	6	5	1	0	15	6	+9	11	—	1–0	1–0	3–1
2	(Sweden) Malmö FF	6	2	2	2	7	7	0	6	2–2	—	3–1	2–1
3	(Bulgaria) Spartak Pleven	6	2	0	4	9	11	−2	4	2–3	2–0	—	4–1
4	(Switzerland) Zürich	6	1	1	4	7	14	−7	3	1–5	0–0	3–0	—

Source: mogiel.net
Rules for classification: 1) Points; 2) Goal difference; 3) Goals scored; 4) Head-to-head points; 5) Away goals scored; 6) Draw.

27 June 1981
Round 1

Malmö FF (Sweden)	2–1	(Switzerland) Zürich
Palmér 29' (1:0); Nilsson 45' (2:0)	FCZ summary	80' (2:1) Moser; (yellow card) Iselin; (yellow card) Zappa

Malmö Stadion, Malmö
Attendance: 2,042
Referee: (Sweden) Ingemar Johansson

4 July 1981
Round 2

Werder Bremen (West Germany)	3–1	(Switzerland) Zürich
Reinders 12' (1:1); Kostedde 35' (2:1); Reinders 40' (3:1); Reinders (penalty missed) 66′	FCZ summary	6' (0:1) Erba

Wilhelmshaven
Attendance: 4,000
Referee: (West Germany) Dieter Pauly

11 July 1981
Round 3

Zürich (Switzerland)	3–0	(Bulgaria) Spartak Pleven
Zwicker 26' (1:0); Kurz 60' (2:0); Landolt 65' (3:0)	FCZ summary

Kestenholz
Attendance: 800
Referee: (Switzerland) Georges Sandoz (Corcelles-Cormondrèche, Neuchâtel)

18 July 1981
Round 4

Zürich (Switzerland)	0–0	(Sweden) Malmö FF
	FCZ summary

Sportplatz Thal, Kloten
Attendance: 900
Referee: (Switzerland) Rudolf Renggli (Luzern)

25 July 1981
Round 5

Spartak Pleven (Bulgaria)	4–1	(Switzerland) Zürich
Getov 4' (1:0); Lazarev 31' (2:0); Todorov 41' (3:0); Milkov 56' (4:0)	FCZ summary	68' (4:1) Erba

Pleven
Attendance: 2,500
Referee: (Bulgaria) Čončev

2 August 1981
Round 6

Zürich (Switzerland)	1–5	(West Germany) Werder Bremen
Zappa 12' (1:0)	FCZ summary	23' (pen. 1:1) Reinders; 37' (1:2) Meier; 67' (1:3) Reinders; 75' (1:4) Otten; 78' (1:5) Rautiainen

Sportplatz im Moos, Rüschlikon
Attendance: 1,450
Referee: (Switzerland) André Daina (Éclépens)

=== Group 4 ===
Pos	Team	Pld	W	D	L	GF	GA	GD	Pts	BUD	OB	ÖST	WAC
1	(Socialist Federal Republic of Yugoslavia) Budućnost	6	3	2	1	12	7	+5	8	—	4–2	3–1	1–2
2	(Denmark) Odense	6	2	3	1	11	9	+2	7	1–1	—	3–0	1–1
3	(Sweden) Öster	6	2	1	3	7	9	−2	5	0–0	0–1	—	4–1
4	(Austria) SSW Innsbruck	6	1	2	3	9	14	−5	4	1–3	3–3	1–2	—

Source: mogiel.net
Rules for classification: 1) Points; 2) Goal difference; 3) Goals scored; 4) Head-to-head points; 5) Away goals scored; 6) Draw.

=== Group 5 ===
Pos	Team	Pld	W	D	L	GF	GA	GD	Pts	AGF	BRN	LIN	BRA
1	(Denmark) AGF	6	4	1	1	9	7	+2	9	—	4–2	1–0	2–1
2	(Czechoslovakia) Zbrojovka Brno	6	2	2	2	11	10	+1	6	3–0	—	2–3	2–1
3	(Austria) LASK	6	2	2	2	9	10	−1	6	1–1	2–2	—	3–1
4	(Sweden) Brage	6	1	1	4	6	8	−2	3	0–1	0–0	3–0	—

Source: mogiel.net
Rules for classification: 1) Points; 2) Goal difference; 3) Goals scored; 4) Head-to-head points; 5) Away goals scored; 6) Draw.

=== Group 6 ===
Pos	Team	Pld	W	D	L	GF	GA	GD	Pts	MOL	BRY	SPA	YB
1	(Belgium) Molenbeek	6	3	2	1	10	7	+3	8	—	2–1	2–2	3–1
2	(Norway) Bryne	6	2	2	2	5	6	−1	6	0–0	—	0–3	0–0
3	(Czechoslovakia) Sparta Prague	6	2	1	3	8	8	0	5	3–2	0–2	—	0–1
4	(Switzerland) Young Boys	6	2	1	3	4	6	−2	5	0–1	1–2	1–0	—

Source: mogiel.net
Rules for classification: 1) Points; 2) Goal difference; 3) Goals scored; 4) Head-to-head points; 5) Away goals scored; 6) Draw.

=== Group 7 ===
Pos	Team	Pld	W	D	L	GF	GA	GD	Pts	GÖT	HER	B05	GCZ
1	(Sweden) IFK Göteborg	6	5	0	1	12	6	+6	10	—	1–0	2–1	2–1
2	(West Germany) Hertha Berlin	6	4	0	2	12	6	+6	8	1–2	—	2–0	5–1
3	(Czechoslovakia) Bohemians Prague	6	3	0	3	10	8	+2	6	2–1	1–2	—	3–1
4	(Switzerland) Grasshopper Club	6	0	0	6	5	19	−14	0	1–4	1–2	0–3	—

Source: mogiel.net
Rules for classification: 1) Points; 2) Goal difference; 3) Goals scored; 4) Head-to-head points; 5) Away goals scored; 6) Draw.

=== Group 8 ===
Pos	Team	Pld	W	D	L	GF	GA	GD	Pts	KIC	VIK	WIL	MAR
1	(West Germany) Stuttgarter Kickers	6	4	2	0	13	4	+9	10	—	4–0	3–1	2–0
2	(Norway) Viking	6	3	2	1	8	7	+1	8	0–0	—	2–2	3–0
3	(Netherlands) Willem II	6	2	2	2	11	10	+1	6	3–3	0–1	—	4–1
4	(Bulgaria) Marek Dupnitsa	6	0	0	6	2	13	−11	0	0–1	1–2	0–1	—

Source: mogiel.net
Rules for classification: 1) Points; 2) Goal difference; 3) Goals scored; 4) Head-to-head points; 5) Away goals scored; 6) Draw.

=== Group 9 ===
Pos	Team	Pld	W	D	L	GF	GA	GD	Pts	CHE	ANT	NÆS	LUZ
1	(Czechoslovakia) Cheb	6	3	2	1	15	9	+6	8	—	2–0	1–1	6–0
2	(Belgium) Royal Antwerp	6	3	1	2	12	7	+5	7	4–1	—	0–1	2–2
3	(Denmark) Næstved	6	3	1	2	7	8	−1	7	2–3	0–3	—	1–0
4	(Switzerland) Luzern	6	0	2	4	6	16	−10	2	2–2	1–3	1–2	—

Source: mogiel.net
Rules for classification: 1) Points; 2) Goal difference; 3) Goals scored; 4) Head-to-head points; 5) Away goals scored; 6) Draw.

== See also ==
- 1981–82 European Cup
- 1981–82 UEFA Cup Winners' Cup
- 1981–82 UEFA Cup
