= Markus Frei =

Swiss football manager (born 1952)

Personal information
- Date of birth: 3 March 1952 (age 74)

Managerial career
- Years: Team
- 1978–1981: FC Frauenfeld
- 1987–1988: FC St. Gallen

Markus Frei (born 3 March 1952) is a Swiss football manager.
