= Leen Barth =

Dutch football player (born 1952)

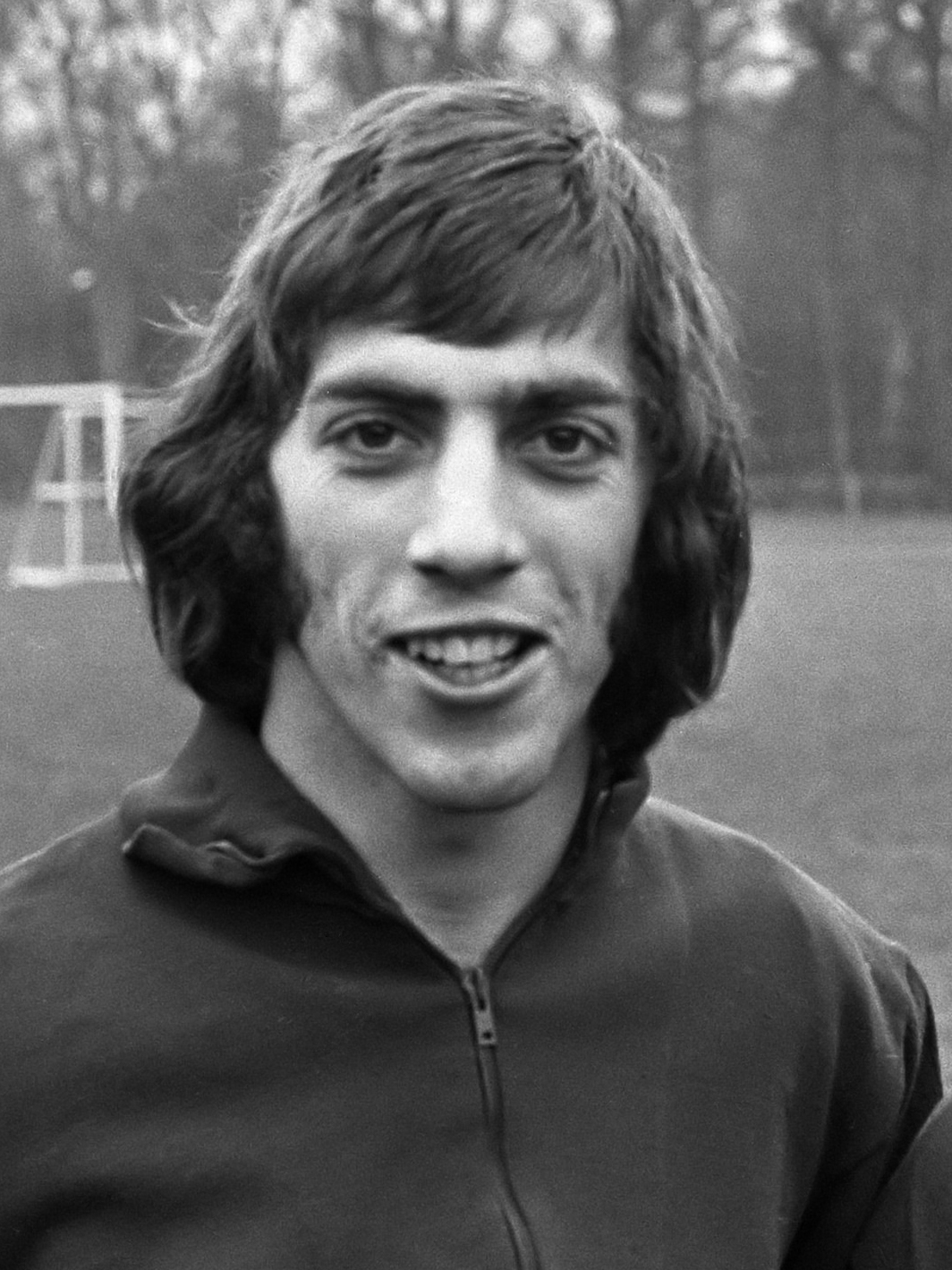
- Barth in 1972

Personal information
- Full name: Leendert Barth
- Date of birth: January 11, 1952 (age 74)
- Place of birth: Puttershoek, Netherlands
- Position: Goalkeeper

Youth career
- 1968–1969: Fortuna Vlaardingen

Senior career*
Years	Team	Apps	(Gls)
1969–1970	Fortuna Vlaardingen	10	(0)
1970–1975	Anderlecht	28	(0)
1975–1976	Union SG	30	(0)
1976–1981	Club Brugge	63	(0)
1981–1985	Cercle Brugge	118	(0)
Total		249	(0)

International career^{‡}
- Netherlands U-16
- Netherlands U-17
1968–1970	Netherlands U-19	15	(0)
- Netherlands U-21
- * Club domestic league appearances and goals as of 18 June 2009 ‡ National team caps and goals as of 18 June 2009

Leendert Barth (born 11 January 1952 in Puttershoek) is a Dutch retired football player. He was mainly a back-up goalkeeper who played his entire career in Belgium, except for one season in the Dutch Eerste Divisie.

== Playing career ==
=== Club ===
Barth started his career with Fortuna Vlaardingen. At the age of 19, he moved to RSC Anderlecht where he would soon become back-up goalie for Jan Ruiter, and later on for Jacky Munaron. Being denied a chance as first choice keeper, Leen Barth moved to a different Brussels side, Union SG. He stayed there for one season.

In 1976, Leen Barth signed for Club Brugge. He played for them until 1981. Barth then went to cross city rivals Cercle Brugge where he remained until his retirement.

=== International ===
Leen Barth represented his country at youth level.

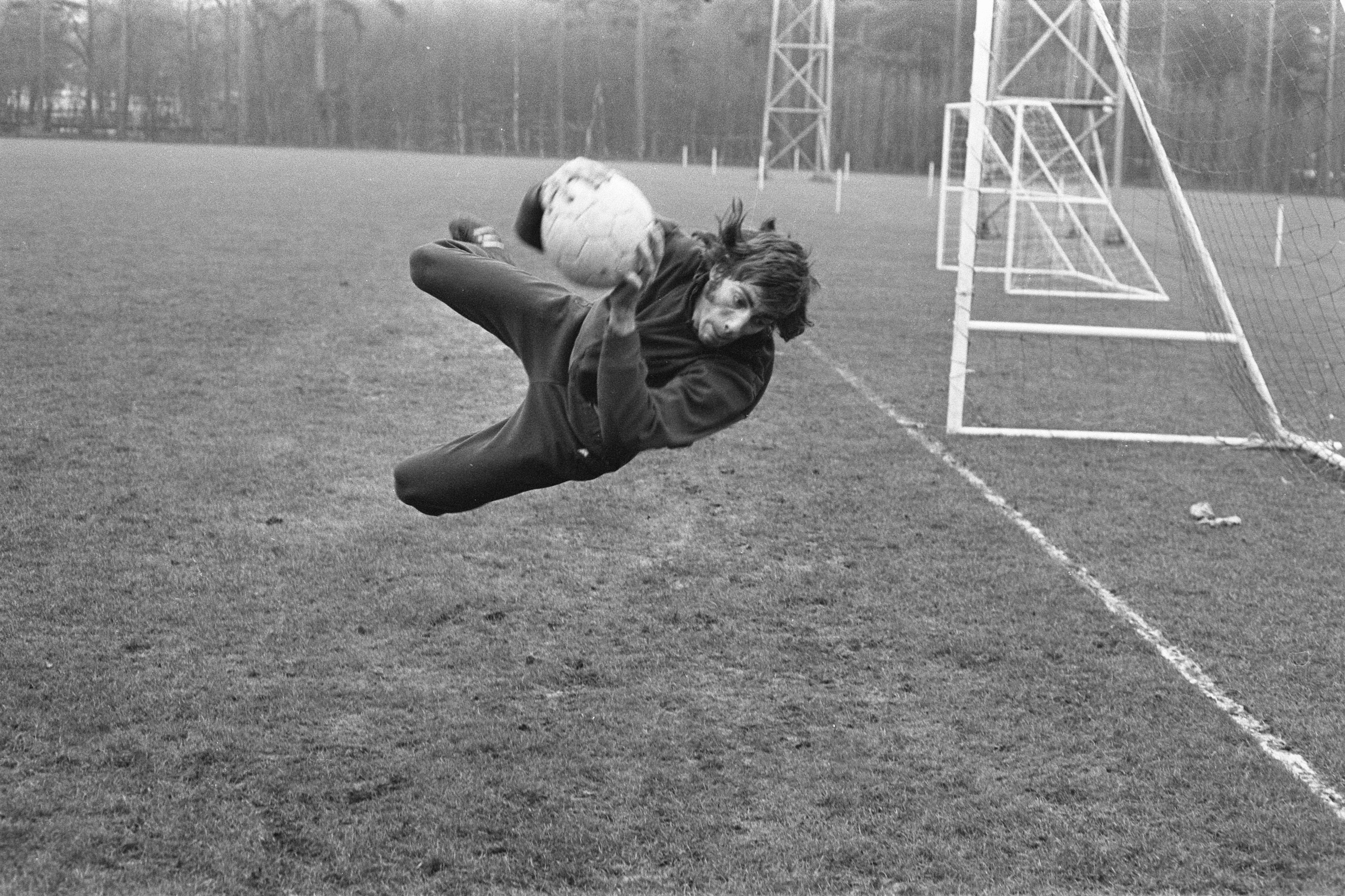
Barth during a training with the Netherlands-U21 at Anderlecht in 1972

== Managerial career ==
He became coach of lower league clubs, FC Knokke and SK Torhout, and then quit football.

== Honours ==
=== Club ===
RSC Anderlecht

- Belgian First Division (2): 1971–72, 1973–74
- Belgian Cup (3): 1971–72, 1972–73, 1974–75
- Belgian League Cup (2): 1973, 1974

Club Brugge

- Belgian First Division (3): 1976–77, 1977–78, 1979–80
- Belgian Cup (1): 1976–77
- Belgian Supercup (1): 1980
- European Champion Clubs' Cup: 1977-78 (runners-up)
- Jules Pappaert Cup (1): 1978
- Bruges Matins (1): 1979

Cercle Brugge

- Belgian Cup (1): 1984–85
