= 1980–81 Swiss Cup =

Tournament details
- Country: Switzerland

Final positions
- Champions: Lausanne-Sport
- Runners-up: Zürich

The 1980–81 Swiss Cup was the 56th season of Switzerland's annual football cup competition.

== Overview ==
The competition began on 2 and 3 August 1980 with the first games of the first round and was completed on Whit Monday 8 June 1981 with the final, which was held at the former Wankdorf Stadium in Bern. The teams from the Nationalliga B were granted byes for the first round. The games of the second round were played one week later, on the weekend 9 and 10 of August. The teams from the Nationalliga A were granted byes for the first three rounds, they joined the competition in the fourth round on 26/27 and 28 September. The matches were played in a knockout format. Up until the fifth round, in the event of a draw at the end of extra time, the match was decided with a penalty shoot-out. In and after the fifth round replays were foreseen and this was played on the visiting team's pitch. The winners of the cup qualified themselves for the first round of the Cup Winners' Cup in the next season.

== Round 2 ==
=== Summary ===
The teams from the NLB had joined the cup competition in the second round. Whenever possible, the draw was respecting regionalities and the lower-tier team was granted home advantage.

| Team 1 | Score | Team 2 |
|---|---|---|
9/10 August 1980
| Monthey | 1–2 | Vevey Sports |
| SC Emmen | 5–5 (a.e.t.) (4–3 p) | Biel-Bienne |
| SC Zug | 0–1 | Grenchen |
| FC Boudry | 0–3 | Bern |
| Central Fribourg | 0–5 | Fribourg |
| FC Sursee | 2–0 | Kriens |
| FC Oberentfelden | 1–0 | Wettingen |
| FC Uzwil | 0–1 | Frauenfeld |
| Burgdorf | 2–2 (a.e.t.); Aarau pen. | Aarau |
| Morobbia Giubiasco | 0–2 | Mendrisiostar |
| FC Stäfa ZH | 1–6 | Lugano |
| FC Onex | 1–5 | Bulle |
| FC Rapid Ostermundigen | 0–2 | La Chaux-de-Fonds |
| Brühl | 2–5 | Winterthur |
| FC Ibach | 2–3 (a.e.t.) | FC Lerchenfeld |
| FC Suhr | 2–1 (a.e.t.) | Emmenbrücke |
| FC Fétigny | 0–1 | Stade Lausanne |
| Gossau | 1–2 (a.e.t.) | FC Altstätten (St. Gallen) |
| FC Birsfelden | 1–0 | Muttenz |
| FC Aurore Bienne | 0–2 | FC Allschwil |
| FC Breitenbach | 1–1 (a.e.t.); Laufen pen | Laufen |
| Concordia Lausanne | 2–4 | FC Orbe |
| FC Renens | 1–0 | FC Vernier |
| Yverdon-Sport | 1–2 (a.e.t.) | Martigny-Sports |
| Stade Nyonnais | 4–0 | FC Saint-Jean GE |
| Meyrin | 1–2 | Etoile Carouge |
| Lengnau | 5–1 | Delémont |
| FC Wolhusen | 2–1 | Köniz |
| FC Olten | 0–2 | Schaffhausen |
| Blue Stars | 1–0 | US Giubiasco |
| Vaduz | 3–0 | FC Unterstrass |
| Losone Sportiva | 0–3 | FC Turicum ZH |
| SC Düdingen | 3–2 | FC Estavayer-le-Lac |
| FC Kilchberg | 1–2 | SC Veltheim |
| FC Widnau | 2–1 (a.e.t.) | FC Zwingen |
| FC Hinwil | 0–3 | Red Star |

=== Matches ===
9 August 1980

| Burgdorf | 2–2 (a.e.t.) | Aarau |
|---|---|---|
| Goal | FCA summary | Goal |
Penalties
| Penalty scored Penalty missed | 2–4 | Penalty scored |

Stadion Neumatt, Burgdorf
Attendance: 700
Referee: (Switzerland) Hauri

== Round 3 ==
=== Summary ===
| Team 1 | Score | Team 2 |
|---|---|---|
23 August 1980
| Frauenfeld | 1–0 | Winterthur |
| Lengnau | 3–1 | La Chaux-de-Fonds |
| Aarau | 7–1 | SC Emmen |
| Schaffhausen | 2–1 | FC Widnau |
| FC Birsfelden | 2–1 | Grenchen |
| Vevey Sports | 3–2 (a.e.t.) | FC Orbe |
| Düdingen | 3–4 | Fribourg |
| FC Oberentfelden | 2–1 | FC Sursee |
| Stade Nyonnais | 1–6 | Etoile Carouge |
| Laufen | 1–2 | FC Allschwil |
| FC Altstätten (St. Gallen) | 3–2 | Blue Stars |
24 August 1980
| SC Veltheim | 4–2 | Red Star |
| FC Suhr | 3–1 | FC Lerchenfeld |
| FC Renens | 2–5 | Martigny-Sports |
| FC Wohlhusen | 0–6 | Bern |
| Stade Lausanne | 1–2 | Bulle |
| Vaduz | 4–3 | FC Turicum ZH |
| Mendrisiostar | 1–1 (a.e.t.) (3–4 p) | Lugano |

=== Matches ===
23 August 1980

| Aarau | 7–1 | SC Emmen |
|---|---|---|
| Goal | FCA summary | Goal |

Stadion Brügglifeld, Aarau
Attendance: 900

== Round 4 ==
The teams from the NLA joined the cup competition in the fourth round. Again, whenever possible, the draw was respecting regionalities and the lower-tier team was granted home advantage.

=== Summary ===
| Team 1 | Score | Team 2 |
|---|---|---|
26 September 1980
| Bulle | 4–2 | Bern |
27 September 1980
| FC Oberentfelden | 1–3 | Chênois |
| FC Altstätten (St. Gallen) | 3–3 (a.e.t.) (6–5 p) | Lugano |
| Martigny-Sports | 2–1 | Servette |
| FC Birsfelden | 0–2 | Chiasso |
| Aarau | 0–6 | Grasshopper Club |
| Frauenfeld | 2–4 | Zürich |
| Fribourg | 0–3 | Basel |
| Vevey Sports | 0–4 | Sion |
28 September 1980
| Lengnau | 0–1 | Lausanne-Sport |
| Vaduz | 1–6 | Luzern |
| Schaffhausen | 0–2 | Young Boys |
| Etoile Carouge | 3–4 (a.e.t.) | Nordstern |
| SC Veltheim | 0–1 (a.e.t.) | St. Gallen |
| FC Suhr | 0–4 | Neuchâtel Xamax |
| FC Allschwil | 0–3 | Bellinzona |

=== Matches ===
27 September 1980

| Martigny-Sports | 2–1 | Servette |
|---|---|---|
| Goal | Servette summary | (0:1) Schnyder |

Stade d'Octodure, Martigny

27 September 1980

| Aarau | 0–6 | Grasshopper Club |
|---|---|---|
| | FCA summary | Goal |

Referee: (Switzerland) Rudolf Renggli (Luzern)

27 September 1980
19:00

| Frauenfeld | 2–4 | Zürich |
|---|---|---|
| Hanspeter Studer 28' (1:0); Frei 82' (2:3) | FCZ summary | 32' (1:1) Elsener; 59' (1:2) Seiler; 68' (1:3) Moser; 88' (2:4) Erba |

Kleine Allmend, Frauenfeld
Attendance: 2,800
Referee: (Switzerland) Bruno Burgener (Kriens)

27 September 1980
20:00

| Fribourg | 0–3 | Basel |
|---|---|---|
| | FCB summary | 36' (0:1) Lauscher; 47' (0:2) Maissen; 87' (0:3) Mullis |

Stade Universitaire, Fribourg
Attendance: 2,300
Referee: (Switzerland) Othmar Winter

28 September 1980

| Schaffhausen | 0–2 | Young Boys |
|---|---|---|
| | YB summary | 57' (0:1) Berkemeier; 90' (0:2) Schönenberger |

Stadion Breite, Schaffhausen
Attendance: 3,900
Referee: (Switzerland) Marino Paggiola

== Round 5 ==
=== Summary ===
| Team 1 | Score | Team 2 |
|---|---|---|
8 November 1980
| Grasshopper Club | 4–1 | Young Boys |
9 November 1980
| Bulle | 0–5 | Zürich |
| Lausanne-Sport | 1–0 | Luzern |
| Chiasso | 0–2 (a.e.t.) | Sion |
| Basel | 6–0 | Martigny-Sports |
| Chênois | 0–1 | Nordstern |
| St. Gallen | 2–0 | Neuchâtel Xamax |
| Bellinzona | 2–1 | FC Altstätten (St. Gallen) |

=== Matches ===
8 November 1980
14:30

| Grasshopper Club | 4–1 | Young Boys |
|---|---|---|
| Egli 5' (1:0); Hermann 25' (2:0); Sulser 59' (3:1); Zanetti 74' (4:1) | summary | 56' (2:1) Schönenberger |

Hardturm, Zürich
Attendance: 4,700
Referee: (Switzerland) André Daina (Éclépens)

9 November 1980
14:30

| Bulle | 0–5 | Zürich |
|---|---|---|
| | FCZ summary | Jerković 13' (0:1); Jerković 27' (0:2); Seiler 55' (0:3); Seiler 65' (0:4); Zwicker 87' (0:5) |

Stade de Bouleyres, Bulle
Attendance: 5,000
Referee: (Switzerland)

9 November 1980
14:30

| Basel | 6 – 0 | Martigny-Sports |
|---|---|---|
| Küttel 1' (1:0); Maissen 22' (2:0); Maissen 38' (3:0); Küttel 48' (4:0); Stohler (penalty missed) 66′ Tanner 67' (5:0); Gaisser 84' (6:0) | Summary |

St. Jakob Stadium, Basel
Attendance: 1,900
Referee: (Switzerland) Roland Chapuis

== Quarter-finals ==
=== Summary ===
| Team 1 | Score | Team 2 |
|---|---|---|
29 November 1980
| Zürich | P–P | Basel |
30 November 1980
| Nordstern | 2–2 (a.e.t.) | Lausanne-Sport |
| Sion | 3–1 | St. Gallen |
| Bellinzona | 1–4 | Grasshopper Club |
28 March 1981
| Zürich | 3–0 | Basel |

The original Match FCZ-FCB should have been played on 29 November, but was posponed due to snow.

Replay

| Team 1 | Score | Team 2 |
|---|---|---|
2 March 1981
| Lausanne-Sport | 3–1 | Nordstern |

=== Matches ===
29 March 1981
15:00

| Zürich | 3–0 | Basel |
|---|---|---|
| Elsener (yellow card) 15'; Seiler 24' (1:0); Elsener 42' (2:0); Seiler 70' (3:0); Baur (yellow card) 88' | FCB summary FCZ summary |

Letzigrund, Zürich
Attendance: 14,000
Referee: (Switzerland) Peter Scherz

== Semi-finals ==
=== Summary ===
| Team 1 | Score | Team 2 |
|---|---|---|
20 April 1981
| Lausanne-Sport | 1–1 (a.e.t.) | Grasshopper Club |
| Sion | 0–0 (a.e.t.) | Zürich |

Replays

| Team 1 | Score | Team 2 |
|---|---|---|
5 May 1981
| Zürich | 4–0 | Sion |
12 May 1981
| Grasshopper Club | 1–3 | Lausanne-Sport |

=== Matches ===
20 April 1981

| Sion | 0–0 (a.e.t.) | Zürich |
|---|---|---|
| | FCZ summary | (yellow card) 107' Lüdi; (yellow card) 114' Zwicker |

Stade de Tourbillon, Sion
Attendance: 13,000
Referee: (Switzerland) Ulrich Nyffenegger (Nidau)

5 May 1981

| Zürich | 4–0 | Sion |
|---|---|---|
| Peterhans 8' (1:0); Zappa 31' (2:0); Moser 45' (3:0); Zappa 88' (4:0) | FCZ summary |

Letzigrund, Zürich
Attendance: 8,735
Referee: (Switzerland) Georges Sandoz (Corcelles-Cormondrèche, Neuchâtel)

== Final ==
The final was held at the former Wankdorf Stadium in Bern on Whit Monday 1981.

=== Summary ===
| Team 1 | Score | Team 2 |
|---|---|---|
8 June 1981
| Lausanne-Sport | 4–3 (a.e.t.) | Zürich |

=== Telegram ===
8 June 1981
15:00

| Lausanne-Sport | 4–3 (a.e.t.) | Zürich |
|---|---|---|
| Raczynski (yellow card) 4'; Kok 47' (1:1); Mauron 65' (2:2); Crescenzi 97' (3:2); Crescenzi 99' (4:2) | Fussball-Schweiz summary | 38' (0:1) Lüdi; 52' (pen.) Zappa; (yellow card) 76' Zappa; (red card) 103' Iselin; 107' (4:3) Peterhans; (yellow card) 117' Lüdi |

Wankdorf Stadium, Bern
Attendance: 40,000
Referee: (Switzerland) Jakob Baumann (Schaffhausen)

Lausanne-Sport won the cup and this was the club's seventh cup title to this date.

== Further in Swiss football ==
- 1980–81 Nationalliga A
- 1980–81 Swiss 1. Liga

== Sources ==
- Fussball-Schweiz
- [ 1980–81 at fcb-achiv.ch]
- Switzerland 1980–81 at RSSSF

| Preceded by 1979–80 | Swiss Cup seasons | Succeeded by 1981–82 |
