= Manfred Moser =

Liechtensteiner footballer (born 1958)

Personal information
- Full name: Manfred Heinrich Moser
- Date of birth: 12 May 1958 (age 68)
- Position: Midfielder

Youth career
- –1975: FC Vaduz

Senior career*
Years	Team	Apps	(Gls)
1975–1977	FC Vaduz		
1977–1981	FC Zürich	66	(6)
1981–1982	FC Chiasso	22	(1)
1982–1983	FC Lugano		
1983–1984	FC Nordstern Basel		
1984	FC Zürich		
1984–1988	FC Vaduz		
1988–1989	FC Young Fellows Zürich		
1989–1992	FC Vaduz		
1992–1993	FC Triesen		
Total		88	(7)

International career
1982-1984	Leichtenstein	2	(0)
- * Club domestic league appearances and goals

Manfred Heinrich Moser (born 12 May 1958) is a Liechtenstein former professional footballer who played as a midfielder.

== Club career ==
During the 1980–81 season, Moser would win the league title and the league cup, and would also play in the domestic cup final, ultimately losing.

== International career ==
Moser made his national team debut for Liechtenstein in a friendly match against Switzerland on 9 March 1982.

== Honours ==
FC Zürich

- Swiss Super League: 1980–81
- Swiss League Cup: 1980–81
- Swiss Cup runner-up: 1980-81
