= Jonny Otten =

German footballer (born 1961)

Personal information
- Date of birth: 31 January 1961 (age 65)
- Place of birth: Hagen im Bremischen, West Germany
- Height: 1.80 m (5 ft 11 in)
- Position: Left-back

Youth career
- Hagener SV

Senior career*
Years	Team	Apps	(Gls)
1979–1992	Werder Bremen	349	(3)
1992–1993	VfB Oldenburg	2	(0)
1994	BV Cloppenburg		
1994–1995	TSG Schönberg		
1995–1996	Rotenburger SV		

International career
1983–1984	West Germany	6	(0)
- * Club domestic league appearances and goals

Jonny Otten (born 31 January 1961) is a German retired professional footballer who played mostly as a left back.

== Club career ==
Born in Hagen im Bremischen, Lower Saxony, Otten played 13 years as a professional at SV Werder Bremen, making his Bundesliga debut at the age of 18 and never losing his starting position again (except through injury) until the end of 1990. He totalled 308 top division matches, scoring his only goal on 26 November 1983 in an 8–1 home routing of Kickers Offenbach; in the 1987–88 UEFA Cup, he took the pitch in the 66th minute of a match at Spartak Moscow (after a 4–1 loss in the Soviet Union), and helped turn things around with a tough approach, for a final 6–2 home win.

After leaving Bremen in 1992, having played twice in the club's victorious run in the UEFA Cup Winners' Cup, Otten had a brief spell in the second division with VfB Oldenburg, then spent a couple of seasons in the amateur leagues before retiring from the game.

== International career ==
Otten earned six caps for West Germany, during 13 months and five days. His debut came on 23 February 1983, as he played the second half of a 1–0 friendly loss in Portugal after coming on as a substitute for Lothar Matthäus.

== Honours ==
Werder Bremen

- Bundesliga: 1987–88
- DFB-Pokal: 1990–91; runner-up 1988–89, 1989–90
- UEFA Cup Winners' Cup: 1991–92
- DFL-Supercup: 1988
