= Claudio Sulser =

Swiss footballer (born 1955)

Personal information
- Date of birth: 8 October 1955 (age 71)
- Place of birth: Lugano, Switzerland
- Height: 1.84 m (6 ft 0 in)
- Position: Striker

Senior career*
Years	Team	Apps	(Gls)
1972–1973	FC Mendrisio-Stabio	7	(2)
1973–1977	FC Vevey Sports 05	0	(0)
1977–1986	Grasshoppers	241	(121)
1986–1989	Lugano	14	(8)

International career
1977–1986	Switzerland	49	(13)
- * Club domestic league appearances and goals

Claudio Sulser (born 8 October 1955) is a Swiss former professional footballer who played as a striker for FC Mendrisio-Stabio, FC Vevey Sports 05, Grasshoppers and Lugano. He also represented the Switzerland national team.

He was the second chairman of the FIFA Ethics Committee between 2010 and 2012 and therefore was the head of the investigation into the voting scandal haunting the 2018 and 2022 World Cup selections, until the committee was reformed in 2012, being led by jurists from then on.

== Honours ==
Grasshoppers

- Swiss Super League: 1977–78, 1981–82, 1982–83, 1983–84
- Swiss Cup: 1982–83

Individual

- Swiss Footballer of the Year: 1982
- Swiss Super League top scorer: 1979–80, 1981–82
- UEFA European Cup top scorer: 1978–79
