= 1965–66 FC Basel season =

FC Basel
1965–66 season
- Chairman: Lucien Schmidlin
- Manager: Helmut Benthaus
- Ground: Landhof or St. Jakob Stadium, Basel
- Nationalliga A: 6th
- Swiss Cup: Semi-final
- Inter-Cities Fairs Cup: Second round
- Cup of the Alps: Group stage
- Top goalscorer: League: Roberto Frigerio (15); All: Roberto Frigerio (22)
- Highest home attendance: 10,000 on 24.10.1965 vs Lausanne-Sport and on 6.03.1966 vs Servette
- Lowest home attendance: 3,000 on 21.11.1965 vs Young Fellows Zürich
- Average home league attendance: 6,200

The 1965–66 season was Fussball Club Basel 1893's 72nd season in their existence. It was their 20th consecutive season in the top flight of Swiss football after their promotion in the 1945–46 season. They played their home games either in the traditional stadium Landhof or in their new venue the St. Jakob Stadium. Lucien Schmidlin was club chairman for the fourth consecutive year.

== Overview ==
=== Pre-season ===
To the beginning of the season Helmut Benthaus transferred in from 1. FC Köln and became player-coach. He replaced Jiří Sobotka as team manager, who went on to manage the Swiss national team. Benthaus was a graduate of the German Sport University Cologne and an experienced player trainer. Two seasons earlier Benthaus had won the 1963–64 Bundesliga as player-manager with Köln. Benthaus used his first season with Basel to observe, feel and classify. One of the biggest changes that he made, with the agreement of the board of directors, was introduce semi-professionalism.

There were only a few minor changes to the squad, Rade Ognjanović transferred to Grenchen and Heinz Sartor transferred to Offenburger FV. Three players stepped back from Nationalliga A football, Carlo Porlezza, Mario Grava and Fernando Von Krannichfeldt went to play for the reserve team. As replacements three youngsters came from the youth team and three more from the reserve team.

=== Domestic league ===
Fourteen teams contested the 1965–66 Nationalliga A. These were the top 12 teams from the previous 1964–65 season and the two newly promoted teams Urania Genève Sport and Young Fellows Zürich. Basel finished the season in sixth position with 27 points. They ended the championship with ten wins, seven draws and nine defeats in their 26 matches. They scored 64 goals and conceded 57. Top league goal scorer was Roberto Frigerio with 15 goals, ahead of Karl Odermatt who scored 11 and Helmut Hauser with 10 goals. Basel played 15 Test games, winning ten, one draw and losing four. Roberto 'Mucho' Frigerio was also the top scorer in these games, with 16 goals in just 13 games. Alone in the match against Black Stars Basel he managed to net the ball six times.

=== Swiss Cup ===
In the Swiss Cup Basel started in the round of 32 on 7 November 1965, with a home win against Biel-Bienne. In the next round they played at home against Luzern with a 3–1 win. In the next round they were drawn away in the Wankdorf Stadium, Bern, against Young Boys. This ended in a 2–1 victory. In the semi-final they were drawn at home against Servette but were defeated 1–3. Zürich won the final and completed the double.

=== Inter-Cities Fairs Cup ===
In the 1965–66 Inter-Cities Fairs Cup Basel were drawn against Spanish team Valencia, but were beaten twice. In the Cup of the Alps Basel were drawn in the same group as Catania, S.S.C. Napoli, Juventus and Spal Ferrara. All four games ended in a defeat.

== Players ==
Note: Flags indicate national team as defined under FIFA eligibility rules; some limited exceptions apply. Players may hold more than one non-FIFA nationality.

No.	Pos.	Nation	Player
1	GK	SUI	Marcel Kunz
2	DF	GER	Josef Kiefer
3	DF	SUI	Bruno Michaud
4	DF	SUI	Markus Pfirter
5	DF	SUI	Hanspeter Stocker
6	FW	GER	Helmut Hauser
7	FW	SUI	Hanspeter Vetter (new from youth team)
8	MF	GER	Helmut Benthaus
9	FW	SUI	Roberto Frigerio
10	DF	SUI	Walter Mundschin (new from youth team)
11	FW	SUI	Aldo Moscatelli
—	GK	FRA	Jean-Paul Laufenburger
—	GK	SUI	Hans-Ruedi Günthardt

No.	Pos.	Nation	Player
—	DF	SUI	Walter Baumann
—	DF	SUI	Peter Füri
—	DF	SUI	Roland Paolucci (new from youth team)
—	DF	SUI	Silvan Schwager (new)
—	DF	SUI	Urs Siegenthaler (new from reserve team)
—	MF	SUI	Werner Decker
—	FW	SUI	Bruno Gabrieli
—	FW	GER	Helmut Hauser
—	FW	HUN	Janos Konrad
—	MF	SUI	Karl Odermatt
—	FW	ITA	Enrico Mazzola
—	FW	SUI	Alois Holenstein (reserve team)
—	FW	SUI	Urs Rickenbacher (reserve team)

Players who left the squad

Note: Flags indicate national team as defined under FIFA eligibility rules; some limited exceptions apply. Players may hold more than one non-FIFA nationality.

No.	Pos.	Nation	Player
—	MF	SUI	Carlo Porlezza
—	FW	FRA	Mario Grava
—	MF	SUI	Fernando Von Krannichfeldt (to reserve team)

No.	Pos.	Nation	Player
—	FW	YUG	Rade Ognjanović (to Grenchen)
—	MF	GER	Heinz Sartor (to Offenburger FV)
—	MF	SUI	Rudolf Arn
—	MF	SUI	Hans Weber (deceased)

== Results ==
Legend

Win Draw Loss Postponed

=== Friendly matches ===
==== Pre-season ====
Pre-season	Basel (Switzerland)	6–0	(Switzerland) Concordia Basel	Basel
	Goal	Summary

24 July 1965 Pre-season	FC Pratteln (Switzerland)	0–8	(Switzerland) Basel	In den Sandgruben, Pratteln
		Summary	Moscatelli 2'; Odermatt 2'; Baumann; Hauser; Michaud

28 July 1965 Pre-season	SV Schopfheim (Germany)	0–3	(Switzerland) Basel	Schopfheim
		Summary	Odermatt; Keller; Moscatelli

31 July 1965 Pre-season	FC Trimbach (Switzerland)	0–7	(Switzerland) Basel	Leinfeld, Trimbach
		Summary	(o.g.); 1' Moscatelli; 2' Frigerio (pen.) Michaud; 1' Vetter; 1' Odermatt	Attendance: 1,100; Referee: (Switzerland) W. Lüthy Gerlafingen

8 August 1965 Pre-season	FC Moutier (Switzerland)	1–7	(Switzerland) Basel	Stade de Chalière, Moutier
	von Burg 34' (1:1)	Summary	26' (0:1) Füri; 54' (1:2) Baumann; 64' (1:3) Benthaus; 69' (1:4) Frigerio; 70' (1:5) Hauser; 80' (1:6) Odermatt; 89' (1:7) Hauser	Attendance: 800; Referee: (Switzerland) Roland Keller Bern

10 August 1965 Pre-season	Basel (Switzerland)	2–4	(West Germany) 1. FC Köln	St. Jakob Stadium, Basel
20:00	Löhr 10' (o.g. 1:1); Odermatt 25' (2:1)	Summary	4' (0:1) Müller; 40' (2:2) Hornig; 60' (2:3) Overath; 67' (2:4) Müller	Attendance: 15,000; Referee: (Switzerland) Rudolf Scheurer Bettlach

14 August 1965 Pre-season	St. Gallen (Switzerland)	0–1	(Switzerland) Basel	Espenmoos, St. Gallen
17:00		Summary	90' (0:1) Frigerio	Attendance: 2,600; Referee: (Switzerland) Pius Kamber Zürich

==== Winter break and mid-season ====
21 January 1966 Winter break	Basel (Switzerland)	7–1	(Switzerland) Schaffhausen	Landhof, Basel
14:30	Baumann 19' (1:0); Hauser 24' (2:0); Hauser 30' (3:0); Benthaus 49' (4:1); Decker 74' (5:1); Hauser 83' (6:1); Decker 88' (7:1)	Summary	47' (3:1) Brühlmann	Attendance: 300; Referee: (Switzerland) H. R. Keller Basel

6 February 1966 Winter break	Bellinzona (Switzerland)	2–1	(Switzerland) Basel	Stadio Comunale Bellinzona
	Tagli 37' (1:0); Capoferri 74' (2:1)	Summary	52' (1:1) Odermatt; (penalty missed) 70' Odermatt	Attendance: 500; Referee: (Switzerland) Dalpian Cassarate

12 February 1966 Winter break	Basel (Switzerland)	1–4	(Switzerland) Lausanne-Sport	Landhof, Basel
14:30	Hauser 10' (1:0)	Summary	40' (1:1) Vuilleumier; 56' (1:2) Kerkhoffs; 68' (1:3) Kerkhoffs; 84' (o.g. 1:4) Michaud	Attendance: 2,500; Referee: (Switzerland) C. Stettler Feuerthalen

16 February 1966 Winter break	Black Stars (Switzerland)	0–9	(Switzerland) Basel	Buschweilerhof, Basel
19:15		Summary	29' (0:1) Frigerio (0:2) Frigerio (0:3) Frigerio; 65' (0:4) Frigerio; 65' (pen. 0:5) Stocker (0:6) Hauser; 70' (0:7) Moscatelli (0:8) Frigerio (0:9) Frigerio	Referee: (Switzerland) F. Hänggi

19 February 1966 Winter break	Solothurn (Switzerland)	1–2	(Switzerland) Basel	Stadion FC Solothurn, Solothurn
	Amez-Droz 13' (1:0)	Summary	21' (1:1) Benthaus; 72' (1:2) Frigerio	Attendance: 600; Referee: (Switzerland) Rudolf Scheurer Bettlach

24 February 1966 Winter break	FC Birsfelden (Switzerland)	2–6	(Switzerland) Basel	Birsfelden
	Goal	Summary	3' Frigerio; Hauser; Stocker

26 April 1966 Mid-season	Basel (Switzerland)	2–2	(West Germany) TSV 1860 Munich	St. Jakob Stadium, Basel
20:00	Kohlars 46' (o.g. 1:1); Moscatelli 59' (2:1)	Summary	16' (0:1) Küppers; 68' (2:2) Rebele	Attendance: 13,300; Referee: (Switzerland) Karl Göppel Zürich

18 June 1966 Mid-season	Basel (Switzerland)	1–3	(West Germany) FC Schalke 04	Landhof, Basel
17:30	Hauser 38' (1:1)	Summary	21' (0:1) Rausch; 41' (1:2) Neuser; 61' (1:3) Pyka	Attendance: 1.500; Referee: (Switzerland) Josef Zibung Luzern

=== Nationalliga A ===
==== League matches ====
22 August 1965 Round 1	Basel	4–1	FC UGS Genève	Landhof, Basel
15:30	Hauser 42' (1:1); Odermatt 53' (2:1); Frigerio 75' (3:1); Stocker (80 pen. 4:1)	Summary	24' (0:1) Heuri	Attendance: 3,600; Referee: (Switzerland) Josef Zibung Luzern

28 August 1965 Round 2	Basel	2–0	Luzern	Landhof, Basel
16:30	Frigerio 47' (1:0); Stocker	[ Summary]		Attendance: 6,600; Referee: (Switzerland) Werner Mettler St. Gallen

5 September 1965 Round 3	Servette	6–1	Basel	Charmilles Stadium, Geneva
20:30	Bédert 14' (1:0); Bédert 29' (2:0); Bédert 36' (3:0); Bosson 55' (4:0); Schnyder 60' (5:0); Nemeth 72' (6:0)	Summary	(6:1) Hauser	Attendance: 5,400; Referee: (Switzerland) Pius Kamber Zürich

12 September 1965 Round 4	Basel	4–2	Young Boys	St. Jakob Stadium Landhof, Basel
16:00	Pfirter 5' (1:1); Hauser 61' (2:2); Vetter 63' (3:2); Vetter 84' (4:2)	Summary	4' (0:1) Lehmann; 36' (pen. 1:2) Fuhrer	Attendance: 8,000; Referee: (Switzerland) Karl Göppel Zürich

18 September 1965 Round 5	Biel-Bienne	1–1	Basel	Gurzelen Stadion, Biel/Bienne
16:15	Wernle 52' (1:1)	Summary	26' (0:1) Odermatt	Attendance: 3,500; Referee: (Switzerland) Strässle Steinach

21 September 1965 Round 6	Basel	1–5	Grasshopper Club	St. Jakob Stadium Basel
20:00	Frigerio 90' (1:5)	Summary	13' (0:1) Blättler; 32' (0:2) Hummel; 42' (0:3) Blättler; 60' (o.g. 0:4) Gabrieli; 68' (0:5) Blättler	Attendance: 8,500; Referee: (Switzerland) Gilbert Droz Marin-Epagnier

26 September 1965 Round 7	Sion	1–0	Basel	Parc des Sports, Sion
15:00	Eschmann 42' (1:0)	Summary		Attendance: 3,000; Referee: (Switzerland) Othmar Huber Thun

3 October 1965 Round 8	Basel	3–1	Lugano	Landhof, Basel
15:00	Benthaus 47' (1:0); Frigerio 48' (2:0); Odermatt 71' (3:0)	Summary	72' (pen. 3:1) Bossi	Attendance: 6,000; Referee: (Switzerland) Josef Zibung Luzern

10 October 1965 Round 9	La Chaux-de-Fonds	2–1	Basel	Stade Charrière, La Chaux-de-Fonds
15:00	Vuilleumier 7' (1:0); Bertschi 43' (2:0)	Summary	58' (2:1) Frigerio	Attendance: 3,800; Referee: (Switzerland) Roland Keller Bern

24 October 1965 Round 10	Basel	1–1	Lausanne-Sport	St. Jakob Stadium, Basel
15:00	Frigerio 65' (1:0)	Summary	83' (1:1) Hosp	Attendance: 10,000; Referee: (Switzerland) Rudolf Scheurer Bettlach

31 October 1965 Round 11	Grenchen	3–2	Basel	Stadion Brühl, Grenchen
15:00	Fuchs 1' (1:0); Fuchs 6' (2:0); Blum 81' (3:2)	Summary	24' (2:1) Vetter; 58' (2:2) Hauser	Attendance: 4,800; Referee: (Switzerland) Roland David Lausanne

21 November 1965 Round 12	Basel	5–1	Young Fellows Zürich	St. Jakob Stadium Landhof, Basel
14:30	Stocker 18' (pen. 1:0); Hauser 35' (2:0); Stocker 43' (pen 3:0); Odermatt 62' (4:1); Gabrieli 71' (5:1)	Summary	56' (3:1) von Burg	Attendance: 3,000; Referee: (Switzerland) Marcel Despland Yverdon

Round 13	Zürich	v	Basel	Letzigrund, Zürich

Round 14	FC UGS Genève	v	Basel	Stade de Frontenex, Geneva

12 December 1965 Round 15	Luzern	4–4	Basel	Stadion Allmend, Luzern
14:30	Wechselberger 22' (1:1); Pfirter 31' (o.g. 2:1); Schuewig 44' (3:1); Schuewig 45' (4:1)	Summary	9' (0:1) Frigerio; 48' (4:2) Hauser; 81' (o.g. 4:3) Gwerder; 88' (4:4) Odermatt	Attendance: 4,200; Referee: (Switzerland) Marcel Schneuwly Fribourg

6 March 1966 Round 16	Basel	5–2	Servette	St. Jakob Stadium Landhof, Basel
15:00	Odermatt 17' (1:1); Moscatelli 29' (2:2); Pfirter 33' (3:2); Vetter 51' (4:2); Odermatt (5:2)	Summary	14' (0:1) Georgy; 20' (pen. 1:2) Nemeth	Attendance: 10,000; Referee: (Switzerland) Rudolf Scheurer Bettlach

13 March 1966 Round 17	Young Boys	1–1	Basel	Wankdorf Stadium, Bern
	Theunissen 21' (1:0)	Summary	72' (1:1) Kiefer	Attendance: 5,000; Referee: (Switzerland) Pius Kamber Zürich

27 March 1966 Round 18	Basel	5–0	Biel-Bienne	Landhof, Basel
15:00	Odermatt 32' (1:0); Hauser 52' (2:0); Benthaus 70' (3:0); Moscatelli 78' (4:0); Vetter 81' (5:0)	Summary		Attendance: 3,300; Referee: (Switzerland) Josef Zibung Luzen

3 April 1966 Round 19	Grasshopper Club	2–2	Basel	Hardturm, Zürich
15:00	Blättler 18' (1:0); Blättler 21' (2:0)	Summary	68' (2:1) Hauser; 84' (2:2) Frigerio	Attendance: 5,000; Referee: (Switzerland) Mario Clematide Zollikofen

6 April 1966 Round 14	FC UGS Genève	2–2	Basel	Stade de Frontenex, Geneva
	Heuri 23' (1:1); Samba 36' (2:1)	Summary	7' (0:1) Hauser; 77' (2:2) Odermatt	Attendance: 1,400; Referee: (Switzerland) Roland Racine Prilly

17 April 1966 Round 20	Basel	2–1	Sion	Landhof, Basel
15:00	Vetter 28' (1:1); Hauser 87' (2:1)	Summary	2' (0:1) Quentin	Attendance: 4,000; Referee: (Switzerland) Pius Kamber Zürich

23 April 1966 Round 21	Lugano	2–2	Basel	Cornaredo, Lugano
21:00	Gotthardi 77' (1:2); Vidosevic 82' (pen. 2:2)	Summary	26' (0:1) Benthaus; 62' (0:2) Odermatt	Attendance: 6,500; Referee: (Switzerland) Karl Göppel Zürich

1 May 1966 Round 22	Basel	2–0	La Chaux-de-Fonds	Landhof, Basel
16:30	Frigerio 63' (1:0); Odermatt 88' (2:0)	Summary		Attendance: 7,200; Referee: (Switzerland) W. Hardmeier Thalwil

4 May 1966 Round 14	Zürich	3–0	Basel	Letzigrund, Zürich
	Goal	[ Summary]

8 May 1966 Round 23	Lausanne-Sport	5–3	Basel	Olympique de la Pontaise, Lausanne
20:30	Hosp 8' (1:0); Hosp 16' (2:0); Dürr 44' (pen. 3:0); Hertig 66' (4:0); Vuillemier 75' (5:1)	Summary	74' (4:1) Vetter; 77' (5:2) Konrad; 81' (5:3) Michaud	Attendance: 2,500; Referee: (Switzerland) Josef Zibung Luzern

15 May 1966 Round 24	Basel	5–1	Grenchen	Landhof, Basel
17:30	Vetter 10' (1:0); Stocker 25' (2:0); Konrad 43' (3:0); Frigerio 61' (4:0); Frigerio 66' (5:0)	Summary	71' (5:1) Allemann	Attendance: 3,400; Referee: (Switzerland) Roland Keller Bern

22 May 1966 Round 25	Young Fellows Zürich	5–4	Basel	Letzigrund, Zürich
20:00	Feller 9' (1:1); Matus 29' (2:2); Matus 58' (3:2); Hösli 63' (4:2); Fischli 77' (5:2)	Summary	6' (0:1) Stocker; 28' (1:2) Frigerio; 84' (5:3) Frigerio; 88' (5:4) Michaud	Attendance: 900; Referee: (Switzerland) Gilbert Droz Marin

30 May 1966 Round 26	Basel	2–5	Zürich	Landhof, Basel
17:30	Frigerio 64' (1:4); Frigerio 68' (2:4)	Summary	12' (0:1) Stürmer; 17' (0:2) Stürmer; 27' (0:3) Winiger; 48' (0:4) Brodmann; 87' (2:5) Martinelli	Attendance: 7,000; Referee: (Switzerland) A. Ceretti Biel

==== League standings ====
Pos	Team	Pld	W	D	L	GF	GA	GD	Pts	Qualification
1	Zürich (C)	26	18	6	2	73	25	+48	42	Swiss Champions, qualified for 1966–67 European Cup
2	Servette	26	14	7	5	57	45	+12	35	Swiss Cup winners, qualified for 1966–67 Cup Winners' Cup
3	Lausanne-Sport	26	12	8	6	72	46	+26	32	
4	La Chaux-de-Fonds	26	12	7	7	53	42	+11	31	Entered 1966–67 Intertoto Cup
5	Young Boys	26	11	7	8	72	47	+25	29	
6	Basel	26	10	7	9	64	57	+7	27	
7	Grasshopper Club	26	11	5	10	55	54	+1	27	
8	Sion	26	9	8	9	36	36	0	26	Entered 1966–67 Intertoto Cup
9	Lugano	26	6	10	10	27	37	−10	22	
10	Biel-Bienne	26	6	10	10	38	56	−18	22	Entered 1966–67 Intertoto Cup
11	Grenchen	26	8	6	12	42	65	−23	22	Entered 1966–67 Intertoto Cup
12	Young Fellows Zürich	26	7	7	12	46	62	−16	21	
13	Luzern	26	4	10	12	36	56	−20	18	Relegated to Nationalliga B
14	Urania Genève Sport	26	3	4	19	35	78	−43	10	Relegated to Nationalliga B

Source: rsssf.com
(C) Champions

=== Swiss Cup ===
Legend

Win Draw Loss

7 November 1965 Round of 32	Basel	3–1	Biel-Bienne	Landhof, Basel
14:30	Frigerio 32' (1:0); Frigerio 80' (2:1); Hauser 82' (3:1)	Summary	74' (1:1) Stäuble	Attendance: 6,000; Referee: (Switzerland) Anton Bucheli Luzern

19 December 1965 Round of 16	Basel	3–1	Luzern	Landhof, Basel
14:30	Frigerio 53' (1:0); Frigerio 72' (2:1); Stocker 84' (3:1)	Summary	64' (1:1) Borchert	Attendance: 8,500; Referee: (Switzerland) Karl Göppel Zürich

27 February 1966 Quarter-final	Young Boys	1–2	Basel	Wankdorf Stadium, Bern
14:30	Theunissen 50' (1:1)	Summary	10' (0:1) Frigerio; 87' (1:2) Frigerio	Attendance: 15,000; Referee: (Switzerland) Strässle Steinach

20 March 1966 Semi-final	Basel	1–3	Servette	Landhof, Basel
15:00	Hauser 7' (1:1)	Summary	3' (0:1) Nemeth; 45' (1:2) Bedert; 88' (1:3) Daina	Attendance: 17,000; Referee: (Switzerland) Othmar Huber Thun

=== Inter-Cities Fairs Cup ===
Second round

24 November 1965 First leg	Basel (Switzerland)	1–3	(Spain) Valencia	Basel
19:45	Benthaus 7' (1:0)	Summary	17' (1:1) Machado; 22' (1:2) Muñoz; 80' (1:3) Machado	Stadium: St. Jakob Stadium; Attendance: 4,500; Referee: (Germany) Kurt Handwerker

8 December 1965 Second leg	Valencia (Spain)	5–1	(Switzerland) Basel	Valencia
	Machado 1' (1:0); Urtiaga 17' (2:0); Muñoz 31' (3:0); Guillot 32' (4:0); Machado 80' (5:1)	Summary	Hauser 53' (4:1)	Stadium: Mestalla Stadium; Attendance: 30,000; Referee: (France) Robert Lacoste

Valencia won 8–2 on aggregate.

=== Cup of the Alps ===
==== Matches ====
4 June 1966 Round 1	Basel (Switzerland)	0–1	(Italy) Catania	St. Jakob Stadium, Basel
20:00		Summary	2' (0:1) Fanello	Attendance: 7,000; Referee: (Switzerland) Othmar Huber Thun

8 June 1966 Round 2	Basel (Switzerland)	2–4	(Italy) S.S.C. Napoli	St. Jakob Stadium, Basel
20:00	Konrad 62' (1:4); Frigerio 71' (2:4)	Summary	8' (0:1) Altafini; 34' (0:2) Altafini; 51' (0:3) Altafini; 62' (0:4) Montefusco	Attendance: 10,200; Referee: (Italy) Antonio Sbardella

11 June 1966 Round 3	Basel (Switzerland)	1–2	(Italy) Juventus	St. Jakob Stadium, Basel
20:00	Hauser 63' (1:0)	Summary	66' (1:1) Menichelli; 73' (1:2) Mattei	Attendance: 7,600; Referee: (Italy) Ettore Carminati

15 June 1966 Round 4	Basel (Switzerland)	2–3	(Italy) Spal Ferrara	Wankdorf Stadium, Bern
18:15	Rickenbacher 61' (1:1); Hauser 81' (pen. 2:1)	Summary	19' (0:1) Muzzio; 76' (o.g. 1:2) Pfirter; 82' (2:3) Carrera	Attendance: 2,500; Referee: (Switzerland) Karl Göppel Zürich

==== Standings ====
Pos	Team	Pld	W	D	L	GF	GA	GD	Pts	Qualification
1	(Italy) Napoli	4	4	0	0	15	5	+10	8	Winner
2	(Italy) Juventus	4	3	0	1	7	5	+2	6	
3	(Switzerland) Lausanne/Zürich	4	3	0	1	7	6	+1	6	Combined team Lausanne/Zürich
4	(Italy) Spal Ferrara	4	2	1	1	9	8	+1	5	
5	(Switzerland) Young Boys	4	1	1	2	6	8	−2	3	
6	(Italy) Catania	4	1	1	2	1	3	−2	3	
7	(Switzerland) Servette	4	0	1	3	3	8	−5	1	
8	(Switzerland) Basel	4	0	0	4	5	10	−5	0	

Source: rsssf.com

== See also ==
- History of FC Basel
- List of FC Basel players
- List of FC Basel seasons
