= 1966–67 FC Basel season =

FC Basel
1966–67 season
- Chairman: Harry Thommen
- Manager: Helmut Benthaus
- Ground: St. Jakob Stadium, Basel
- Nationalliga A: Champions
- Swiss Cup: Winners
- Inter-Cities Fairs Cup: 1st round
- Top goalscorer: League: Roberto Frigerio (16); All: Roberto Frigerio (23)
- Highest home attendance: 31,000 on 11 June 1967 vs. Grasshopper Club
- Lowest home attendance: 4,200 on 29 October 1966 vs. FC Moutier
- Average home league attendance: 11,738

The 1966–67 season was Fussball Club Basel 1893's 73rd season in their existence. It was their 21st consecutive season in the top flight of Swiss football after their promotion the season 1945–46. They now played their home games in the St. Jakob Stadium, in the south-eastern end of the city and no longer in their old stadium Landhof. Harry Thommen took over as club chairman at the AGM from Lucien Schmidlin who retired and became vice-chairman.

== Overview ==
=== Pre-season ===
During this season Helmut Benthaus was the club player-manager for the second consecutive season. There were only a few minor changes in the squad. Walter Baumann moved to La Chaux-de-Fonds, Silvan Schwager moved to St. Gallen and Bruno Gabrieli moved to Grasshopper Club. Peter Füri moved on to SC Binningen and here he ended his football career. In the other direction Peter Ramseier joined the club from Cantonal Neuchatel and Anton Schnyder joined from Servette.

=== Domestic league ===
There were 14 teams contesting in the 1966–67 Nationalliga A and Basel finished the seasons as champions just one point clear of both FC Zürich in second position and FC Lugano who finished third. Basel won 16 of the 26 games, drawing eight, losing twice, and they scored 60 goals conceding just 20. Roberto Frigerio was the team's top goal scorer with 16 league goals, Helmut Hauser second best goal scorer with 14. In the highest scoring game of the season, a 10–0 win against FC Moutier Roberto 'Mucho' Frigerio managed to score four and in the test game against FC Allschwil he scored six in the 9–1 victory.

=== Swiss Cup ===
In the Swiss Cup Basel started in the round of 32 with a 6–0 home win against Blue Stars and in the round of 16, also a home match, they beat FC Zürich 3–2. In the Quarter-final Basel won the replay against Biel-Bienne 2–1 to qualify for the semi-finals. Basel played an away match in the Stadio Cornaredo against FC Lugano in the semi-final which ended goalless and therefore a replay was required here too. The replay was played in the St. Jakob Stadium and goals from Karl Odermatt and Helmut Benthaus gave Basel a 2–1 victory to qualify for the final which was to take place three days later.

In the Cup final Basel's opponents were Lausanne-Sports. In the former Wankdorf Stadium on 15 May 1967, Helmut Hauser scored the decisive goal via penalty. The game went down in football history due to the sit-down strike that followed this goal. After 88 minutes of play, with the score at 1–1, referee Karl Göppel awarded Basel a controversial penalty. André Grobéty had pushed Hauser gently in the back and he let himself drop theatrically. Subsequent to the 2–1 for Basel the Lausanne players refused to resume the game and they sat down demonstratively on the pitch. The referee had to abandon the match. Basel were awarded the cup with a 3–0 forfait.

Basel had won the double for the first time in the club's history.

=== Inter-Cities Fairs Cup ===
In the first round of the 1966–67 Inter-Cities Fairs Cup Basel were drawn against VV DOS Utrecht. The first leg was played in the Netherlands and ended in a 2–1 defeat, despite an early lead. In the return leg Basel led 2–0 but VV DOS were able to equalise and therefore won 4–3 on aggregate.

== Players ==
Note: Flags indicate national team as defined under FIFA eligibility rules; some limited exceptions apply. Players may hold more than one non-FIFA nationality.

No.	Pos.	Nation	Player
1	GK	SUI	Marcel Kunz (games/goals: 24/0)
2	DF	GER	Josef Kiefer (games/goals: 26/0)
3	DF	SUI	Bruno Michaud (games/goals: 26/2)
4	DF	SUI	Markus Pfirter (games/goals: 26/3)
5	DF	SUI	Hanspeter Stocker (games/goals: 21/4)
6	MF	SUI	Karl Odermatt (games/goals: 26/8)
7	MF	SUI	Anton Schnyder (new, games/goals: 25/1)
8	MF	GER	Helmut Benthaus (games/goals: 18/3)
9	FW	SUI	Roberto Frigerio (games/goals: 24/16)
10	FW	GER	Helmut Hauser (games/goals: 18/14)
11	FW	SUI	Peter Wenger (games/goals: 19/5)

No.	Pos.	Nation	Player
12	FW	SUI	Hanspeter Vetter (games/goals: 7/1)
13	DF	SUI	Walter Mundschin (games/goals: 7/0)
14	MF	SUI	Peter Ramseier (new, games/goals: 5/0)
15	MF	SUI	Aldo Moscatelli (games/goals: 17/3)
—	GK	FRA	Jean-Paul Laufenburger (games/goals: 3/0)
—	GK	SUI	Hans-Ruedi Günthardt (games/goals: 0/0)
—	GK	SUI	Heini Degen (reserves, games/goals: 0/0)
—	FW	HUN	Janos Konrad (games/goals: 1/0)
—	DF	SUI	Werner Decker (reserves, games/goals: 0/0)
—	DF	SUI	Bruno Rahmen (reserves, games/goals: 0/0)
—	DF	SUI	Roland Paolucci (reserves, games/goals: 0/0)}

Players who left the squad

Note: Flags indicate national team as defined under FIFA eligibility rules; some limited exceptions apply. Players may hold more than one non-FIFA nationality.

No.	Pos.	Nation	Player
—	DF	SUI	Walter Baumann (to La Chaux-de-Fonds)
—	DF	SUI	Peter Füri (to SC Binningen)
—	DF	SUI	Silvan Schwager (to St. Gallen)

No.	Pos.	Nation	Player
—	FW	SUI	Bruno Gabrieli (to Grasshopper Club)
—	FW	SUI	Alois Holenstein (to reserve team)
—	FW	SUI	Urs Rickenbacher (to reserve team)

== Results ==
Legend

Win Draw Loss Postponed

=== Friendly matches ===
==== Pre-season ====
Pre-season	FC Allschwil (Switzerland)	0–9	(Switzerland) Basel	Allschwil
		Summary	Benthaus; Frigerio; Hauser; Odermatt

27 July 1966 Pre-season	SV Schopfheim (West Germany)	1–5	(Switzerland) Basel	Schopfheim
	Goal	Summary	Hauser; Frigerio

30 July 1966 Pre-season	FC Allschwil (Switzerland)	0–7	(Switzerland) Basel	Gartenhof Allschwil
19:00		Summary	5' (o.g.) Stoll; 12' (0:2) Benthaus; 37' (0:3) Hauser (0:4) Frigerio (o.g.) Stoll (0:6) Frigerio; 76' (0:7) Konrad	Referee: (Switzerland) Eugen Boller Bottmingen

3 August 1966 Pre-season	Basel (Switzerland)	3–2	(West Germany) Bayern München	St. Jakob Stadium Landhof, Basel
20:00	Benthaus 39' (1:2); Moscatelli 51' (2:2); Ramseier 79' (3:2)	Summary	12' (0:1) Ohlhauser; 30' (0:2) Nafziger	Attendance: 3,500; Referee: (Switzerland) Pius Kamber Zürich

10 August 1966 Pre-season	FC Pratteln (Switzerland)	0–11	(Switzerland) Basel	Pratteln
		Summary	Benthaus 1'; Frigerio 3'; Konrad 1'; Odermatt 1'; Schnyder 1'; Stocker 1'; Vetter 3'

14 August 1966 Pre-season	FC Moutier (Switzerland)	2–2	(Switzerland) Basel	Stade des Places, Glovelier
	Ognanovic (1:2); Mathez (2:2)	Summary	(0:1) Odermatt (0:2) Hauser	Referee: (Switzerland)

==== Winter break ====
18 January 1967 Winter break	CD Tenerife (Spain)	0–0	(Switzerland) Basel	Tenerife
		Summary		Attendance: 3,000

8 February 1967 Winter break	Black Stars Basel (Switzerland)	0–6	(Switzerland) Basel	Buschweilerhof, Basel
20:00		Summary	Frigerio 4' (0:1); Pfirter 37' (0:2); Hauser (0:3); Hauser (0:4); Jakobi (o.g.); Odermatt (0:6)	Referee: (Switzerland) Eugen Boller Bottmingen

12 February 1965 Winter break	Schaffhausen (Switzerland)	1–6	(Switzerland) Basel	Stadion Breite, Schaffhausen
14:30	Wolfi	Summary	(pen.) Stocker; Hauser; 2' Frigerio; 2' Schnyder	Attendance: 700; Referee: (Switzerland) Karl Göppel Zürich

19 February 1967 Winter break	Wettingen (Switzerland)	1–3	(Switzerland) Basel	Stadion Altenburg, Wettingen
	Beichter 65' (1:1)	Summary	(red card) 45' Pfirter; 49' (1:0) Hauser; 68' (1:2) Frigerio; 86' (1:3) Odermatt	Attendance: 1,500; Referee: (Switzerland) Schumacher Luzern

22 February 1967 Winter break	Tennis Borussia Berlin (West Germany)	4–0	(Switzerland) Basel	Poststadion, Berlin
	Lunenburg 13' (1:0); Seemann 29' (2:0); Lunenburg 48' (3:0); Gersdorff 73' (4:0)	Summary		Attendance: 1,505; Referee: (West Germany) Peter Gabor

25 February 1967 Winter break	Old Boys (Switzerland)	0–2	(Switzerland) Basel	Stadion Schützenmatte, Basel
		Summary	(0:1) Schneeberger (0:2) Schneeberger	Attendance: 1,000

=== Nationalliga A ===
==== League matches ====
28 August 1966 Round 1	Basel	1–0	Lugano	St. Jakob Stadium, Basel
20:00	Stocker 85' (pen. 1:0)	Summary		Attendance: 5,000; Referee: (Switzerland) Rudolf Scheurer Bettlach

28 August 1966 Round 2	La Chaux-de-Fonds	0–2	Basel	Stade Charrière, La Chaux-de-Fonds
15:00		Summary	51' (0:1) Frigerio; 53' (0:2) Frigerio	Attendance: 2,000; Referee: (Switzerland) Roland Marendaz Lausanne

4 September 1966 Round 3	Basel	2–2	Lausanne-Sport	St. Jakob Stadium, Basel
20:00	Stocker 19' (pen. 1:1); Stocker 90' (pen. 2:2)	Summary	4' (0:1) Hosp; 73' (1:2) Weibel	Attendance: 9,200; Referee: (Switzerland) Karl Göppel Zürich

11 September 1966 Round 4	Basel	5–0	Grenchen	Landhof, Basel
16:00	Hauser 23' (1:0); Benthaus 39' (2:0); Hauser 63' (3:0); Frigerio 77' (4:0); Frigerio 79' (5:0)	Summary		Attendance: 5,000; Referee: (Switzerland) Josef Zibung Luzern

17 September 1966 Round 5	Servette	1–2	Basel	Charmilles Stadium, Geneva
20:45	Odermatt 34' (o.g.)	Summary	38' (1:1) Odermatt; 69' (1:2) Odermatt	Attendance: 4,600; Referee: (Switzerland) Mario Clematide Zollikofen

25 September 1966 Round 6	Basel	2–2	Young Fellows Zürich	Landhof, Basel
15:00	Hauser 50' (1:1); Odermatt 88' (2:2)	Summary	19' (0:1) von Burg; 83' (1:2) von Burg	Attendance: 6,700; Referee: (Switzerland) Marcel Despland Yverdon

2 October 1966 Round 7	Young Boys	1–1	Basel	Wankdorf Stadium, Bern
20:15	Grünig 19' (pen. 1:0)	Summary	21' (1:1) Hauser	Attendance: 10,000; Referee: (Switzerland) W. Hardmeier Thalwil

9 October 1966 Round 8	Basel	3–1	Zürich	St. Jakob Stadium Landhof, Basel
15:00	Odermatt 4' (1:0); Hauser 9' (2:0); Hauser 28' (pen. 3:0)	Summary	78' (3:1) Trivellin	Attendance: 21,500; Referee: (Switzerland) Anton Bucheli Luzern

16 October 1966 Round 9	Sion	0–0	Basel	Parc des Sports, Sion
15:00	Jungo (yellow card); Perroud (yellow card)	Summary	(yellow card) Moscatelli	Attendance: 10,000; Referee: (Switzerland) Gilbert Droz Marin

29 October 1966 Round 10	Basel	10–0	FC Moutier	Landhof, Basel
14:30	Frigerio 8' (1:0); Moscatelli 18' (2:0); Wenger 28' (3:0); Frigerio 43' (4:0); Hauser 48' (pen. 5:0); Frigerio 61' (6:0); Hauser 69' (7:0); Frigerio 80' (8:0); Moscatelli 84' (9:0); Odermatt 88' (10:0)	Summary		Attendance: 4,200; Referee: (Switzerland) Pius Kamber Zürich

13 November 1966 Round 11	Biel-Bienne	0–2	Basel	Gurzelen Stadion, Biel/Bienne
		Summary	57' (0:1) Hauser; 74' (pen. 0:2) Hauser	Attendance: 7,500; Referee: (Switzerland) Luigi Grassi Novazzano

19 November 1966 Round 12	Basel	4–0	Winterthur	Landhof, Basel
14:30	Hauser 11' (1:0); Stocker 34' (pen. 2:0); Hauser 59' (3:0); Wenger 66' (4:0)	Summary		Attendance: 6,000; Referee: (Switzerland) Strässle Steinach

27 November 1966 Round 13	Grasshopper Club	0–2	Basel	Hardturm, Zürich
	Grahn (yellow card) 28'; Fuhrer (yellow card) 76'	Summary	26' (0:1) Wenger; 30' (0:2) Hauser; (yellow card) 75' Michaud	Attendance: 18,000; Referee: (Switzerland) Rudolf Scheurer Bettlach

4 December 1966 Round 14	Lugano	3–1	Basel	Cornaredo, Lugano
	Luttrop 32' (1:0); Simonetti 47' (2:0); Simonetti 89' (3:1)	Summary	70' (2:1) Frigerio	Attendance: 15,000; Referee: (Switzerland) Karl Göppel Zürich

12 March 1967 Round 15	Basel	1–0	La Chaux-de-Fonds	St. Jakob Stadium, Basel
15:00	Frigerio 71' (1:0)	Summary		Attendance: 12,000; Referee: (Switzerland) A. Ceretti Biel/Bienne

19 March 1967 Round 16	Lausanne-Sport	0–2	Basel	Olympique de la Pontaise, Lausanne
15:00		Summary	68' (0:1) Frigerio; 66' (0:2) Pfirter	Attendance: 7,000; Referee: (Switzerland) Rudolf Scheurer Bettlach

2 April 1967 Round 17	Grenchen	0–4	Basel	Stadion Brühl, Grenchen
		Summary	2' (0:1) Frigerio; 59' (o.g.); 73' (0:3) Moscatelli; 75' (0:4) Frigerio	Attendance: 8,000; Referee: (Switzerland) Roland Keller Bern

9 April 1967 Round 18	Basel	1–1	Servette	St. Jakob Stadium, Basel
20:15	Frigerio 24' (1:1)	Summary	14' (o.g.) Stocker	Attendance: 6,000; Referee: (Switzerland) Mario Clematide Zollikofen

16 April 1967 Round 19	Young Fellows Zürich	2–1	Basel	Letzigrund, Zürich
14:00	Chiaudussi 73' (1:1); Heer 79' (2:1)	Summary	23' (0:1) Vetter	Attendance: 24,500; Referee: (Switzerland) Marcel Schneuwly Fribourg

23 April 1967 Round 20	Basel	4–1	Young Boys	St. Jakob Stadium, Basel
20:00	Frigerio (2x); Michaud; Benthaus	Summary	Goal	Attendance: 13,000; Referee: (Switzerland) Luigi Grassi Novazzano

30 April 1967 Round 21	Zürich	2–2	Basel	Letzigrund, Zürich
16:00	Künzli 39' (pen. 1:2); Stürmer 89' (2:2)	Summary	8' (0:1) Wenger; 27' (0:2) Benthaus; (yellow card) 55' Stocker	Attendance: 20,000; Referee: (Switzerland) Othmar Huber Thun

7 May 1967 Round 22	Basel	2–1	Sion	Landhof, Basel
15:00	Wenger 21' (1:1); Odermatt 83' (2:1)	Summary	17' (0:1) Frochaux	Attendance: 9,000; Referee: (Switzerland) Rudolf Scheurer Bettlach

21 May 1967 Round 23	FC Moutier	0–1	Basel	Stade de Chalière, Moutier
16:30		Summary	55' (0:1) Michaud	Attendance: 5,800; Referee: (Switzerland) Roland Marendaz Lausanne

28 May 1967 Round 24	Basel	4–1	Biel-Bienne	St. Jakob Stadium, Basel
20:00	Pfirter 27' (1:0); Odermatt 53' (2:0); Hauser 68' (pen.); Schnyder 68' (4:0)	Summary	84' (4:1) Matter	Attendance: 14,000; Referee: (Switzerland) Gilbert Droz Marin

4 June 1967 Round 25	Winterthur	0–0	Basel	Schützenwiese, Winterthur
16:00		Summary		Attendance: 11,000; Referee: (Switzerland) Josef Zibung Luzern

11 June 1967 Round 26	Basel	2–2	Grasshopper Club	St. Jakob Stadium Landhof, Basel
16:00	Pfirter 4' (1:0); Odermatt 34' (2:0)	Summary	52' (2:1) Blättler; 60' (2:2) Bernasconi	Attendance: 31,000; Referee: (Switzerland) Rudolf Scheurer Bettlach

==== League table ====
Pos	Team	Pld	W	D	L	GF	GA	GD	Pts	Qualification
1	FC Basel (C)	26	16	8	2	61	20	+41	40	Swiss Champions, qualified for 1967–68 European Cup; Swiss Cup winners
2	FC Zürich	26	18	3	5	70	31	+39	39	
3	FC Lugano	26	17	5	4	51	29	+22	39	Entered 1967 Intertoto Cup
4	Grasshopper Club Zürich	26	14	4	8	60	31	+29	32	
5	Servette FC Genève	26	10	6	10	49	35	+14	26	
6	FC Sion	26	10	6	10	48	38	+10	26	Entered 1967 Intertoto Cup
7	BSC Young Boys	26	10	6	10	44	48	−4	26	Entered 1967 Intertoto Cup
8	FC Grenchen	26	10	4	12	43	49	−6	24	Entered 1967 Intertoto Cup
9	Young Fellows Zürich	26	9	6	11	33	44	−11	24	
10	Lausanne Sports	26	9	3	14	46	44	+2	21	Swiss Cup finalist, qualified for 1966–67 Cup Winners' Cup; Entered 1967 Intertoto Cup
11	FC Biel-Bienne	26	8	5	13	25	42	−17	21	
12	FC La Chaux-de-Fonds	26	8	4	14	34	48	−14	20	Won relegation play-off
13	FC Winterthur	26	8	4	14	33	54	−21	20	Lost relegation play-off, relegated to Nationalliga B
14	FC Moutier	26	2	2	22	16	100	−84	6	Relegated to Nationalliga B

Source: rsssf.com
(C) Champions

=== Swiss Cup ===
6 November 1966 Round of 32	Basel	6–0	Blue Stars	Landhof, Basel
14:15	Frigerio 37' (1:0); Frigerio 41' (2:0); Moscatelli 44' (3:0); Stocker 52' (4:0); Frigerio 63' (5:0); Pfirter 87' (6:0)	Summary		Attendance: 2,200; Referee: (Switzerland) Strässle Steinach

11 December 1966 Round of 16	Basel	3–2	Zürich	St. Jakob Stadium, Basel
14:30	Vetter 13' (1:0); Hauser 72' (2:2); Hauser 79' (3:2)	Summary	62' (1:1) Trivellin; 71' (pen. 1:2) Neumann	Attendance: 22,000; Referee: (Switzerland) Anton Bucheli Luzern

4 March 1967 Quarter-final	Basel	2–2 (a.e.t.)	Biel-Bienne	St. Jakob Stadium, Basel
15:00	Frigerio 27' (1:0); Stocker 58' (pen. 2:1)	Summary	46' (1:1) Graf; 77' (2:2) Leu	Attendance: 12,000; Referee: (Switzerland) Strässle Steinach

8 March 1967 Quarter-final replay	Biel-Bienne	1–2	Basel	Gurzelen Stadion, Biel
20:15	Bai 31' (1:1)	Summary	17' (0:1) Hauser; 59' (1:2) Frigerio	Attendance: 12,500; Referee: (Switzerland) Karl Göppel Zürich

27 March 1967 Semi-final	Lugano	0–0 (a.e.t.)	Basel	Stadio Cornaredo, Lugano
		Summary		Attendance: 16,000; Referee: (Switzerland) Josef Zibung Luzern

12 April 1967 Semi-final replay	Basel	2–1	Lugano	St. Jakob Stadium, Basel
20:00	Odermatt 12' (1:0); Benthaus 72' (2:1)	Summary	41' (1:1) Luttrop	Attendance: 51,000; Referee: (Switzerland) Gilbert Droz Marin

15 May 1967 Final	Basel	2–1	Lausanne-Sports	Wankdorf Stadium, Bern
15:00	Hauser 11' (1:0); Hauser 88' (pen. 2:1)	Summary	41' (o.g.) Josef Kiefer	Attendance: 45,000; Referee: (Switzerland) Karl Göppel Zürich

The final was abandoned in 89' at 2-1 and awarded 3-0 in favour of Basel: Lausanne-Sports protested by a sit-in against the penalty decision that led to 2-1.

=== Inter-Cities Fairs Cup ===
First round

13 September 1966 First leg	DOS Utrecht (Netherlands)	2–1	(Switzerland) Basel	Utrecht
	Stocker 16' (o.g.); Wery 65'	Summary	15' Odermatt	Stadium: Galgenwaard; Attendance: 4,100; Referee: (Scotland) William J. Mullan

21 September 1966 Second leg	Basel	2–2 (3–4 agg.)	(Netherlands) DOS Utrecht	Basel
	Frigerio 59', 62'	Summary	69' Wery; 78' van der Linden	Stadium: St. Jakob Stadium; Attendance: 6,300; Referee: (Germany) Rudolf Kreitlein

Utrecht won 4 – 3 on aggregate.

== See also ==
- History of FC Basel
- List of FC Basel players
- List of FC Basel seasons
