= 1964–65 FC Basel season =

FC Basel
1964–65 season
- Chairman: Lucien Schmidlin
- Manager: Jiří Sobotka
- Ground: Landhof and St. Jakob Stadium, Basel
- Nationalliga A: 8th
- Swiss Cup: Semi-final
- Inter-Cities Fairs Cup: Second round
- Top goalscorer: League: Roberto Frigerio (13); All: Roberto Frigerio (31)
- Highest home attendance: 8,000 30.05.1965 vs. Lausanne-Sport
- Lowest home attendance: 3,000; 27.09.1964 vs. Grasshoppers; 25.10.1964 vs. Bellinzona

The 1964–65 season was Fussball Club Basel 1893's 71st season in their existence. It was their 19th consecutive season in the top flight of Swiss football after their promotion in the 1945–46 season. They played their home games either in their old Landhof Stadium or in their new St. Jakob Stadium. Lucien Schmidlin was club chairman for the third consecutive year.

== Overview ==
=== Pre-season ===
The Czech manager Jiří Sobotka was the Basel team manager at this time, it was his fourth year as manager of the team. There were only a few changes in the squad. Kurt Stettler moved on to Young Fellows Zürich, René Burri to Cantonal Neuchatel and Bruno Gatti to Biel-Bienne. During the winter break Heinz Blumer moved on to Chiasso. In the other direction German striker Heinz Sartor joined from Südwest Ludwigshafen, Werner Decker joined from local team Concordia Basel and Bruno Gabrieli from Nordstern Basel. Basel played a total of 51 matches un this season. 26 of these were in the domestic league, five were in the Swiss Cup, four matches were in the Inter-Cities Fairs Cup and 16 were friendly matches. Of these 16 test games eight were won, four drawn and four were lost.

=== Hans Weber ===
A sad note to be noted is, on 26 December 1964 FCB played against Grasshoppers Zürich in the quarter-finals of the Swiss Cup. They decided the match 3–1 for themselves in overtime, Hans Weber had scored the equaliser two minutes before the end of the regular time. This was to be the very last match for the popular Basler captain of that time Hans Weber, because just seven weeks later he died of cancer. Between his first appearance in 1949 and his death in February 1965 he made 281 appearances for Basel scoring 48 goals. On 31 March 1965 Basel played a match against the Swiss national team as Hans Weber memorial. 17,000 people came to pay their respect and to watch the game. Frigerio, Gabrieli and Baumann scored the goals as Basel won 3–0.

=== Domestic league ===
Fourteen teams contested the 1964–65 Nationalliga A, these were the top 12 teams from the previous season 1963–64 and the two newly promoted teams Lugano and Bellinzona. Basel ended the championship with eleven wins and five draws in their 26 matches, and finished in eighth position with 27 points. They scored 44 goals and conceded 54. For Basel it was a mediocre season with some very unusual and high scoring results, 5–4 at home against Grasshopper Club, 4–3 at home against Biel-Bienne and a 3–3 draw at home against the new champions Lausanne-Sport after a three goal lead before half time. There were also some high scoring defeats, 1–5 away against Grenchen, 0–6 away against Sion, 0–6 away against La Chaux-de-Fonds and a 1–6 away in the last game of the season against Young Boys. Roberto Frigerio was the team's top goal scorer with 13 goals. Lausanne Sports won the championship with 36 points and thus qualified for the following year's 1965–66 European Cup.

=== Swiss Cup ===
In the Swiss Cup Basel started in the round of 64, 10 October 1964, with a home win against lower classed Locarno. In the next round they played at home against Bern which was won 3–1 and, consequently, drawn at home against Lasuanne Sports in the round of 16 which ended in a 3–2 victory. After the quarter-final against Grasshoppers Zürich (mentioned above) Basel were drawn at home again for the semi-final. This game was against Sion and was played on 7 March 1965. Basel were defeated 2–3 and Sion continued to the final which they won against Servette.

=== Inter-Cities Fairs Cup ===
Basel were qualified for the 1964–65 Inter-Cities Fairs Cup and in the first round they played CA Spora Luxembourg. A 2–0 home win and a 0–1 away defeat was enough to take them through to the second round. But two defeats against Strasbourg ended their Fairs Cup competition.

== Players ==
The following is the list of the Basel first team squad during the 1964–65 season. The list includes players that were in the squad on the day that the Nationalliga A season started on 23 August 1964 but subsequently left the club after that date.

Note: Flags indicate national team as defined under FIFA eligibility rules; some limited exceptions apply. Players may hold more than one non-FIFA nationality.

No.	Pos.	Nation	Player
1	GK	SUI	Hans-Ruedi Günthardt
—	GK	FRA	Jean-Paul Laufenburger
—	GK	SUI	Marcel Kunz
2	DF	SUI	Peter Füri
—	DF	SUI	Walter Baumann
—	DF	SUI	Heinz Blumer (to Chiasso)
5	FW	GER	Helmut Hauser
6	FW	SUI	Bruno Gabrieli (from Nordstern Basel)
—	MF	GER	Josef Kiefer
—	DF	SUI	Bruno Michaud
—	DF	SUI	Markus Pfirter
—	DF	SUI	Hanspeter Stocker
—	MF	SUI	Hans Weber

No.	Pos.	Nation	Player
—	MF	SUI	Rudolf Arn (from Luzern)
—	MF	SUI	Werner Decker (from Concordia Basel)
—	FW	HUN	Janos Konrad
—	FW	ITA	Enrico Mazzola
—	FW	SUI	Karl Messerli (from reserve team)
—	FW	SUI	Aldo Moscatelli
—	MF	SUI	Karl Odermatt
—	MF	GER	Heinz Sartor (from Südwest Ludwigshafen)
—	FW	SUI	Roberto Frigerio
—	FW	YUG	Rade Ognjanović
—	MF	SUI	Carlo Porlezza
—	FW	FRA	Mario Grava
—	MF	SUI	Fernando Von Krannichfeldt

Players who left the squad

Note: Flags indicate national team as defined under FIFA eligibility rules; some limited exceptions apply. Players may hold more than one non-FIFA nationality.

No.	Pos.	Nation	Player
—	GK	SUI	Kurt Stettler (to Young Fellows Zürich)
—	DF	SUI	René Burri (to Cantonal Neuchatel)
—	MF	SUI	Walter Löffel (to Solothurn)

No.	Pos.	Nation	Player
—	FW	SUI	Bruno Gatti (to Biel-Bienne)
—	FW	SUI	Klaus Huber
—	FW	GER	Erdmann Lüth

== Results ==
Legend

Win Draw Loss Postponed

=== Friendly matches ===
==== Pre and mid-season ====
Pre-season	Basel (Switzerland)	1–1	(Switzerland) Concordia Basel	Basel
	Goal	Summary	Goal

Pre-season	Nordstern Basel (Switzerland)	0–6	(Switzerland) Basel	Basel
		Summary	Goal

Pre-season	Basel (Switzerland)	6–0	(Switzerland) Schweizer Polizeiauswahl	Basel
	Goal	Summary

5 August 1964 Pre-season	FC Pratteln (Switzerland)	5–5	(Switzerland) Basel	In den Sandgruben, Pratteln
20:00	Lander 2'; Hug 1'; Ferrari 1'; Dürr 1'	Summary	2' Sartor; 2' Pfirter; 1' Frigerio	Attendance: 2,000; Referee: (Switzerland) Karl Keller Basel

9 August 1964 Pre-season	Aarau (Switzerland)	4–2	(Switzerland) Basel	Bächen, Unterentfelden
	Gloor 2'; Küenzle 1'; Lenherr 1'	Summary	1' Frigerio; 1' Hauser	Attendance: 2,000; Referee: (Switzerland) Anton Bucheli Luzern

12 August 1964 Pre-season	FC Münchenstein (Switzerland)	0–14	(Switzerland) Basel	Sportplatz Au, Münchenstein
18:30		Summary	4' Frigerio; 4' Moscatelli; 3' Sartor; 2' Hauser; 1' Gabrieli	Referee: (Switzerland) Zuber Basel

15 August 1964 Pre-season	VfR Rheinfelden (West Germany)	2–6	(Switzerland) Basel	Jahnstadion, Rheinfelden
	Ortega 8' (1:1); Kropf 42' (2:2)	Summary	5' (0:1) Gabrieli; 34' (1:2) Frigerio; 44' (o.g.); 50' (2:4) Moscatelli; 57' (2:5) Gabrieli; 75' (2:6) Moscatelli	Attendance: 400; Referee: (West Germany) Messmer Rheinfelden

18 August 1964 Pre-season	Basel (Switzerland)	1–4	(West Germany) 1. FC Köln	St. Jakob Stadium, Basel
20:00	84' (1:4)	Summary	22' (pen. 0:1) Sturm; 33' (0:2) Schäfer; 62' (0:3) Schäfer; 75' (0:4) Thielen	Attendance: 16,000; Referee: (France) Pierre Schwinte

3 October 1964 Mid-season	Basel (Switzerland)	2–2	(Switzerland) Young Fellows Zürich	Landhof, Basel
15:30	Moscatelli; Frigerio	Summary	Chiandussi; Feller	Attendance: 1,400; Referee: (Switzerland) Rudolf Rettig Gerlafingen

==== Winter break and mid-season ====
31 January 1965 Winter break	Aarau (Switzerland)	3–3	(Switzerland) Basel	Stadion Brügglifeld, Aarau
	Ognjanović 13' (1:0); Grava 30' (2:0); Messerli 77' (3:3)	Summary	37' (2:1) Stiel; 51' (2:2) Gloor; 64' (2:3) Gloor	Attendance: 2,000; Referee: (Switzerland) Josef Zibung Luzern

7 February 1965 Winter break	Baden (Switzerland)	1–4	(Switzerland) Basel	Scharten, Baden
	Andersen 23' (1:1)	Summary	15' (0:1) Ognjanović; 44' (pen. 1:2) Gabrieli; 58' (1:3) Messerli; 87' (1:4) Frigerio	Attendance: 500; Referee: (Switzerland) W. Lüthy Gerlafingen

14 February 1965 Winter break	Schaffhausen (Switzerland)	1–0	(Switzerland) Basel	Stadion Breite, Schaffhausen
14:30	Indlekofer 16' (1:0)	Summary		Attendance: 350; Referee: (Switzerland) Zürrer Feldmeilen

31 March 1965 Mid-season	Basel (Switzerland)	3–0	Switzerland	St. Jakob Stadium, Basel
20:00	Frigerio 62' (1:0); Gabrieli 87' (2:0); Baumann 90' (3:0)	Summary		Attendance: 17,500; Referee: (Switzerland) Gottfried Dienst Basel
Note: Hans Weber memorial.

19 April 1965 Mid-season	FC Porrentruy (Switzerland)	0–3	(Switzerland) Basel	Stade du Tirage, Porrentruy
		Summary	Goal

2 May 1965 Mid-season	Solothurn (Switzerland)	0–1	(Switzerland) Basel	Stadion FC Solothurn, Solothurn
		Summary	Goal

10 June 1965 Mid-season	Basel (Switzerland)	2–4	(West Germany) Borussia Dortmund	St. Jakob Stadium Landhof, Basel
20:00	Hauser 23' (1:2); Moscatelli 31' (2:2)	Summary	6' (0:1) Wosab; 12' (0:2) Wosab; 38' (2:3) Sturm; 86' (2:4) Konietzka	Attendance: 6,000; Referee: (Switzerland) Pius Kamber Zürich

=== Nationalliga A ===
==== League matches ====
23 August 1964 Round 1	Biel-Bienne	3–2	Basel	Gurzelen Stadion, Biel/Bienne
	Rajkov 28' (1:1); Zimmermann 47' (2:1); Gnäg 56' (3:1)	Summary	17' (0:1) Pfirter; Moscatelli	Attendance: 4,000; Referee: (Switzerland) Strässle Steinach

30 August 1964 Round 2	Basel	2–0	Grenchen	Landhof, Basel
15:00	Moscatelli 28' (1:0); Sartor 78' (pen. 2:0)	Summary		Attendance: 5,500; Referee: (Switzerland) Gilbert Droz Marin

6 September 1964 Round 3	Sion	6–0	Basel	Parc-des-Sports, Sion
15:30	Quentin 6' (1:0); Stockbauer 16' (2:0); Quentin 56' (3:0); Quentin 61' (4:0); Quentin (5:0); Georgy 77' (6:0)	Summary		Attendance: 4,000; Referee: (Switzerland) Szabo Bern

13 September 1964 Round 4	Basel	2–2	Luzern	Landhof, Basel
15:00	Pfirter 16' (1:0); Konrad 43' (2:1)	Summary	33' (1:1) Wechselberger; 75' (2:2) Cavazzutt	Attendance: 4,000; Referee: (Switzerland) Rudolf Scheurer Bettlach

19 September 1964 Round 5	Zürich	2–2	Basel	Letzigrund, Zürich
20:15	Meier (II) 7' (1:1); Martinelli 40' (2:1)	Summary	3' (0:1) Frigerio; 63' (2:2) Frigerio	Attendance: 6,200; Referee: (Switzerland) Othmar Huber Thun

27 September 1964 Round 6	Basel	5–4	Grasshopper Club	Landhof, Basel
15:00	Blumer 3' (1:0); Frigerio 40' (2:2); Blumer (3:3); Frigerio 77' (4:4); Hauser 83' (5:4)	Summary	37' (1:1) Kunz; 39' (1:2) Ctherlet; 47' (2:3) Kunz; 70' (3:4) Kunz	Attendance: 3,000; Referee: (Switzerland) D. Mellet Lausanne

18 October 1964 Round 7	La Chaux-de-Fonds	6–0	Basel	Stade Charrière, La Chaux-de-Fonds
15:00	Clerc 17' (1:0); Trivellin 30' (2:0); Clerc 74' (3:0); Clerc 78' (4:0); Trivellin 80' (5:0); Vuillemier 83' (6:0)	Summary		Attendance: 3,400; Referee: (Switzerland) Karl Göppel Zürich

25 October 1964 Round 8	Basel	3–0	Bellinzona	Landhof, Basel
15:00	Grava 2' (1:0); Frigerio 28' (2:0); Grava 80' (3:0)	Summary		Attendance: 3,000; Referee: (Switzerland) W. Hardmeier Thalwil

8 November 1964 Round 9	Lugano	2–0	Basel	Cornaredo, Lugano
	Stocker 32' (o.g.); Boffi 69' (2:0)	Summary		Attendance: 4,000; Referee: (Switzerland) Josef Zibung Luzern

22 November 1964 Round 10	Basel	2–1	Chiasso	Landhof, Basel
14:30	Moscatelli 27' (1:0); Blumer 58' (2:0)	Summary	77' (2:1) Vila	Attendance: 4,500; Referee: (Switzerland) Strässle Steinach

Round 11	Lausanne-Sport	P – P	Basel	Olympique de la Pontaise, Lausanne
				Referee: (Switzerland) Szabo Bern

13 December 1964 Round 12	Basel	2–3	Servette	Landhof, Basel
14:30	Frigerio 25' (1:1); Frigerio 44' (2:2)	Summary	11' (0:1) Schindelholz; 35' (1:2) Nemeth; 53' (2:3) Desbiolles	Attendance: 8,500; Referee: (Switzerland) Guinnard Gletterens

16 December 1964 Round 11	Lausanne-Sport	1–2	Basel	Olympique de la Pontaise, Lausanne
19:30	Kerkhoffs 20' (1:1)	Summary	5' (0:1) Ognjanovic; 51' (1:2)	Attendance: 5,000; Referee: (Switzerland) Szabo Bern

20 December 1964 Round 13	Basel	0–1	Young Boys	Landhof, Basel
14:30		Summary	4' (0:1) Schultheiss	Attendance: 4,700; Referee: (Switzerland) Roland David Lausanne

21 February 1965 Round 14	Basel	4–3	Biel-Bienne	Landhof, Basel
14:45	Ognjanovic 14' (1:0); Hauser 36' (2:1); Stocker 49' (3:1); Hauser 88' (4:3)	Summary	18' (1:1) Makay; 58' (3:2) Makay; 73' (3:3) Makay	Attendance: 7,500; Referee: (Switzerland) Karl Göppel Zürich

28 February 1965 Round 15	Grenchen	5–1	Basel	Stadion Brühl, Grenchen
15:00	von Burg 6' (1:0); Stutz 8' (2:0); Blum 31' (3:1); Allemann 50' (4:1); Kominek 90' (5:1)	Summary	15' (2:1) Pfirter	Attendance: 2,000; Referee: (Switzerland) Pius Kamber Zürich

14 March 1965 Round 16	Basel	4–0	Sion	Landhof, Basel
15:00	Grava 26' (1:0); Odermatt 27' (2:0); Odermatt 57' (3:0); Frigerio 88' (4:0); Peter Füri (yellow card)	Summary		Attendance: 3,200; Referee: (Switzerland) Gilbert Droz Marin-Epagnier

21 March 1965 Round 17	Luzern	2–1	Basel	Stadion Allmend, Luzern
	Hofer 26' (1:1); Hofer 88' (2:1); Jorio (yellow card)	Summary	16' (0:1) Frigerio; (yellow card) (yellow-red card) 89' Pfirter	Attendance: 3,900; Referee: (Switzerland) Mario Clematide Zollikofen

28 March 1965 Round 18	Basel	1–0	Zürich	Landhof, Basel
15:00	Ognjanović 12' (1:0)	Summary		Attendance: 7,000; Referee: (Switzerland) Othmar Huber Thun

4 April 1965 Round 19	Grasshopper Club	3–1	Basel	Hardturm, Zürich
	Berset 18' (1:0); Berset 52' (2:0); Blättler (3:0)	Summary	77' (3:1) Frigerio	Attendance: 5,000; Referee: (Switzerland) Josef Zibung Luzern

25 April 1965 Round 20	Basel	1–1	La Chaux-de-Fonds	Landhof, Basel
16:00	Michaud 84' (pen. 1:1)	Summary	63' (0:1) Brossard	Attendance: 4,000; Referee: (Switzerland) W. Hardmeier Thalwil

9 May 1965 Round 21	Bellinzona	0–0	Basel	Stadio Comunale Bellinzona
		Summary		Attendance: 2,500; Referee: (Switzerland) Pius Kamber Zürich

16 May 1965 Round 22	Basel	2–0	Lugano	Landhof, Basel
16:00	Hauser 8' (1:0); Frigerio 70' (2:0)	Summary	(yellow card) Coduri	Attendance: 5,000; Referee: (Switzerland) Werner Mettler St. Gallen

23 May 1965 Round 23	Chiasso	0–1	Basel	Stadio Via Comacini, Chiasso
		Summary	87' (0:1) Ognjanović	Attendance: 2,200; Referee: (Switzerland) Strässle Steinach

30 May 1965 Round 24	Basel	3–3	Lausanne-Sport	St. Jakob Stadium Landhof, Basel
15:00	Ognjanović 12' (1:0); Stocker 24' (2:0); Stocker 37' (3:0)	Summary	39' (3:1) Schneiter; 48' (3:2) Kerkhoffs; 52' (3:3) Armbruster	Attendance: 8,000; Referee: (Switzerland) Anton Bucheli Luzern

5 June 1965 Round 25	Servette	0–2	Basel	Charmilles Stadium, Geneva
20:00		Summary	74' (0:1) Odermatt; 89' (0:2) Ognjanović	Attendance: 6,500; Referee: (Switzerland) Josef Zibung Luzern

12 June 1965 Round 26	Young Boys	6–1	Basel	Wankdorf Stadium, Bern
	Fuhrer 5' (1:0); Lehmann 16' (2:0); G. Meier 71' (3:1); Fuhrer 82' (4:1); Lehmann 84' (5:1); Lehmann 87' (6:1)	Summary	65' (2:1) Frigerio	Attendance: 10,000; Referee: (Switzerland) Rudolf Scheurer Bettlach

==== League table ====
Pos	Team	Pld	W	D	L	GF	GA	GD	Pts	Qualification
1	Lausanne-Sport (C)	26	15	6	5	61	32	+29	36	1965–66 European Cup
2	Young Boys	26	14	4	8	59	43	+16	32	
3	Servette	26	14	3	9	59	30	+29	31	
4	Grasshopper Club	26	11	7	8	54	47	+7	29	Entered 1965–66 Intertoto Cup
5	Lugano	26	9	11	6	29	30	−1	29	Entered 1965–66 Intertoto Cup
6	La Chaux-de-Fonds	26	12	3	11	52	39	+13	27	Entered 1965–66 Intertoto Cup
7	Luzern	26	9	9	8	33	38	−5	27	Entered 1965–66 Intertoto Cup
8	Basel	26	11	5	10	44	54	−10	27	
9	Sion	26	10	5	11	42	34	+8	25	Swiss Cup winners, qualified for 1965–66 European Cup Winners' Cup
10	Zürich	26	8	7	11	41	38	+3	23	
11	Grenchen	26	6	9	11	35	43	−8	21	
12	Biel-Bienne	26	8	5	13	35	56	−21	21	
13	Bellinzona	26	5	9	12	21	42	−21	19	Relegated to Nationalliga B
14	Chiasso	26	6	5	15	22	61	−39	17	Relegated to Nationalliga B

Source: rsssf.com
(C) Champions

=== Swiss Cup ===
11 October 1964 Round of 64	Basel	6–1	Locarno	Basel
14:30	Frigerio 11' (1:0); Blumer 40' (2:1); Blumer 51' (3:1); Frigerio 60' (4:1); Moscatelli (yellow card) (goal) 73' (5:1); Frigerio 82' (6:1)	Summary	31' (pen. 1:1) Comel; (yellow card) Cattarin (II)	Stadium: St. Jakob Stadium; Attendance: 2,500; Referee: (Switzerland) Fernand Burioli Lausanne

1 November 1964 Round of 32	Basel	3–1	Bern	Basel
14:30	Pfirter 10' (1:0); Hauser 32' (2:0); Gabrieli 82' (3:1)	Summary	72' (2:1) Oehler	Stadium: St. Jakob Stadium; Attendance: 3,000; Referee: (Switzerland) Guinnard Gletterens

5 December 1964 Round of 16	Basel	3–2	Lausanne Sports	Basel
14:30	Frigerio 2' (1:0); Frigerio 17' (2:0); Moscatelli 30' (3:2)	Summary	22' (2:1) Hosp; 28' (2:2) Hosp	Stadium: St. Jakob Stadium; Attendance: 11,000; Referee: (Switzerland) Karl Göppel Zürich

27 December 1964 Quarter-final	Basel	3–1 (a.e.t.)	Grasshoppers	Basel
14:30	Stocker (penalty missed) 40′ Weber 88' (1:1); Frigerio 116' (2:1); Hauser 120' (3:1)	Summary	8' (0:1) Blättler	Stadium: St. Jakob Stadium; Attendance: 8,700; Referee: (Switzerland) Gilbert Droz

7 March 1965 Semi-final	Basel	2–3	Sion	Basel
15:00	Frigerio 52' (1:2); Odermatt 70' (2:3)	Summary	1' (1:0) Perroud; 35' (2:0) Georgy; 55' (1:3) Stockbauer	Stadium: St. Jakob Stadium; Attendance: 7,000; Referee: (Switzerland) W. Hardmeier Thalwil

=== Inter-Cities Fairs Cup ===
First round

9 September 1964 First leg	Basel (Switzerland)	2–0	CA Spora Luxembourg	Basel
20:00	Grava 14' (1:0); Grava 66' (2:0)	Summary		Stadium: St. Jakob Stadium; Attendance: 1,500; Referee: (France) Pierre Schwinte

8 October 1964 Second leg	CA Spora Luxembourg	1–0	(Switzerland) Basel	Luxembourg
	Joseph Krier 20' (1:0)	Summary		Stadium: Stade Josy Barthel; Attendance: 600; Referee: (Belgium) Robert Schaut

Basel won 2–1 on aggregate.

Second round

3 November 1964 First leg	Basel (Switzerland)	0–1	(France) Strasbourg	Basel
19:45		Summary	Gress 51' (0:1)	Stadium: St. Jakob Stadium; Attendance: 3,500; Referee: (Germany) Helmut Fritz

11 November 1964 Second leg	Strasbourg (France)	5–2	(Switzerland) Basel	Strasbourg
	Farías 13' (1:0); Sbaiz 21' (2:0); Hausser 28' (3:1); Hausser 52' (4:2); Szczepaniak 83' (5:2)	Summary	Frigerio 22' (pen. 2:1); Blumer 35' (3:2)	Stadium: Stade de la Meinau; Attendance: 5,500; Referee: (Belgium) Joseph Hannet

Strasbourg won 6–2 on aggregate.

== See also ==
- History of FC Basel
- List of FC Basel players
- List of FC Basel seasons
