= Günthardt =

Günthardt is a Swiss surname. Notable people with the surname include:

- Hansruedi Günthardt (1931–2005), Swiss footballer
- Heinz Günthardt (born 1959), Swiss tennis player
- Markus Günthardt (born 1957), Swiss tennis player
- Rudolf Günthardt (born 1936), Swiss equestrian
