= Hans Müller (footballer) =

Swiss footballer (born 1954)

Personal information
- Full name: Hans Müller
- Date of birth: 17 July 1954 (age 72)
- Place of birth: Basel, Switzerland
- Height: 1.82 m (6 ft 0 in)
- Position: Goalkeeper

Youth career
- until 1972: FC Basel

Senior career*
Years	Team	Apps	(Gls)
1972–1984	FC Basel	100	(0)
1984–1986	FC Laufen	13	(0)
- * Club domestic league appearances and goals

Hans Müller (born 17 July 1954) is a Swiss retired footballer who played for FC Basel. He played as goalkeeper.

== Career ==
Müller joined Basel's first team as reserve goalkeeper in 1972. After having played in two test games, he made his domestic league debut for the club in the away game in the Olympique de la Pontaise on 26 May 1973, as Basel played a goalless draw against Lausanne-Sport. He was substituted in during the 30th minute after standard goalkeeper Jean-Paul Laufenburger had been injured. During the following season, he played mainly in Basel's reserve team, but advanced to become Basel's standard goalkeeper in their 1974–75 season when Jean-Paul Laufenburger and Marcel Kunz both ended their active playing days.

Between the years 1972 and 1984, Müller played a total of 226 games for Basel. Exactly 100 of these games were in the Nationalliga A, eight in the Swiss Cup, ten in the Swiss League Cup, one in the European Cup, three in the UEFA Cup, two in the UEFA Cup Winners' Cup, 20 in the Cup of the Alps and 82 were friendly games.

After his twelve seasons with Basel, Müller moved on to FC Laufen who at that time played in the Nationalliga B the second tier of Swiss football. After two years in Laufen Müller retired from active football.

== Honours ==
- Swiss League: 1972-73, 1976-77, 1979-80
- Swiss Cup: 1974–75

== Sources ==
- Rotblau: Jahrbuch Saison 2017/2018. Publisher: FC Basel Marketing AG. ISBN 978-3-7245-2189-1
- Die ersten 125 Jahre. Publisher: Josef Zindel im Friedrich Reinhardt Verlag, Basel. ISBN 978-3-7245-2305-5
- Verein "Basler Fussballarchiv" Homepage
