= Karl Messerli =

Swiss footballer (born 1947)

Personal information
- Full name: Karl Messerli
- Date of birth: 3 March 1947 (age 79)
- Place of birth: Switzerland
- Position: Midfielder

Youth career
- until 1965: FC Basel

Senior career*
Years	Team	Apps	(Gls)
1964–1965	FC Basel	2	(0)
1965–1966	FC Aarau	0	(0)
1965–1969	Brühl St. Gallen	71	(27)
1969–1970	Grasshopper Club Zürich	9	(0)
1970–1971	FC Luzern	10	(1)
1971–1974	FC Chiasso	70	(27)
1974–1976	Nordstern Basel	24	(8)
1976	FC Chiasso	8	(0)
- * Club domestic league appearances and goals

Karl Messerli (born 3 March 1947) is a Swiss former footballer who played in the 1960s and 1970s as midfielder.

Messerli played in FC Basel's reserve team and as he was needed he advanced to their first team in their 1964–65 season under manager Jiří Sobotka. After playing in two test games, in both of which he scored a goal, Messerli played his domestic league debut for the club in the home game at the Landhof on 21 February 1965 as Basel won 4–3 against Biel-Bienne.

In this one season that Messerli played for the club, he played a total of four games for Basel, scoring those two mentioned goals. Two of these games were in the Nationalliga A and two were friendly games.

Following this season Messerli moved on to play for FC Aarau, then for Brühl St. Gallen, both of whom played in the second tier of Swiss football. He then moved for one season to Grasshopper Club Zürich and one season to FC Luzern in the top tier.

In the summer of 1971 Messerli then transferred to FC Chiasso, who at that time played in the second tier, and at the end of the season 1971–72 Messerli and his team won promotion from the Nationalliga B to the Nationalliga A He played for Chiasso for another two seasons before he moved to Nordstern Basel. During the winter break of the season 1975–76 he returned to Chiasso, where he ended his active playing career.

== Sources ==
- Die ersten 125 Jahre. Publisher: Josef Zindel im Friedrich Reinhardt Verlag, Basel. ISBN 978-3-7245-2305-5
- Verein "Basler Fussballarchiv" Homepage
