= Rudolf Arn =

Swiss footballer (born 1935)

Rudolf "Ruedi" Arn
Personal information
- Full name: Rudolf Arn
- Date of birth: 1 November 1935 (age 90)
- Place of birth: Niederbipp, Switzerland
- Position: Midfielder

Senior career*
Years	Team	Apps	(Gls)
1957–1964	FC Luzern	164	(7)
1964–1965	FC Basel	1	(0)
- * Club domestic league appearances and goals

Rudolf "Ruedi" Arn (born 1 November 1935) is a Swiss former footballer who played in the late 1950s and early 1960s as midfielder.

Born in Niederbipp, Oberaargau, Arn played at least seven seasons for Luzern and joined FC Basel's first team for their 1964–65 season under player-manager Helmut Benthaus. After playing in three test games Arn played his domestic league debut for his new club in the away game on 23 August 1964 as Basel were defeated 2–3 against Biel-Bienne.

This was the only league match that Arn played for Basel in the Nationalliga A and then it seems that he then ended his active playing career.

== Sources ==
- Die ersten 125 Jahre. Publisher: Josef Zindel im Friedrich Reinhardt Verlag, Basel. ISBN 978-3-7245-2305-5
- Verein "Basler Fussballarchiv" Homepage
