= Hanspeter Vetter =

Swiss footballer (born 1944)

Personal information
- Full name: Hanspeter Vetter
- Date of birth: 9 January 1944 (age 82)
- Place of birth: Switzerland
- Position: Striker

Senior career*
Years	Team	Apps	(Gls)
1965–1968	FC Basel	30	(9)
- * Club domestic league appearances and goals

Hanspeter Vetter (born 9 January 1944) is a Swiss retired footballer who played for FC Basel in the 1960s. He played mainly in the position as forward, but also as midfielder.

Vetter joined Basel's first team for their 1965–66 season under player-manager Helmut Benthaus. He played his domestic league debut for the club in the home game at the Landhof on 28 August 1965 as Basel won 2–0 against Luzern. He scored his first goal for his club just two weeks later, on 12 September 1965. In fact he scored two goals, the team's third and fourth goals, as they won the home game 4–2 against Young Boys.

Between the years 1965 and 1968 Vetter played a total of 63 games for Basel scoring a total of 17 goals. 30 of these games were in the Nationalliga A, eight in the Swiss Cup, eight in the european competitions (Cup of the Alps and Inter-Cities Fairs Cup) and 17 were friendly games. He scored nine goals in the domestic league, one in the cup and the other seven were scored during the test games.

== Sources ==
- Rotblau: Jahrbuch Saison 2017/2018. Publisher: FC Basel Marketing AG. ISBN 978-3-7245-2189-1
- Die ersten 125 Jahre. Publisher: Josef Zindel im Friedrich Reinhardt Verlag, Basel. ISBN 978-3-7245-2305-5
- Verein "Basler Fussballarchiv" Homepage
