= Silvan Schwager =

Swiss footballer (born 1946)

Personal information
- Full name: Silvan Schwager
- Date of birth: 1946 (age 79–80)
- Place of birth: Switzerland
- Positions: Defender; midfielder

Senior career*
Years	Team	Apps	(Gls)
1965–1966	FC Basel	7	(0)
1966–1968	FC St. Gallen	32	(0)
1968–1970	FC Thun	28	(8)
- * Club domestic league appearances and goals

Silvan Schwager (born 1946) is a Swiss former footballer who played in the 1960s. He played as midfielder but also as defender.

Schwager joined FC Basel's first team for their 1965–66 season under player-manager Helmut Benthaus. After playing in one test game against local club Concordia Basel, Schwager played his domestic league debut for the club in the away game on 26 September 1965 as Basel lost 0–1 against Sion.

Schwager played this one season for Basel and a total of 15 games without scoring a goal. Seven of these games were in the Nationalliga A, two in the european competitions (Cup of the Alps and Inter-Cities Fairs Cup) and six were friendly games.

He then moved on and played two seasons for FC St. Gallen and at least another two seasons for FC Thun

== Sources ==
- Rotblau: Jahrbuch Saison 2017/2018. Publisher: FC Basel Marketing AG. ISBN 978-3-7245-2189-1
- Die ersten 125 Jahre. Publisher: Josef Zindel im Friedrich Reinhardt Verlag, Basel. ISBN 978-3-7245-2305-5
- Verein "Basler Fussballarchiv" Homepage

(NB: Despite all efforts, the editors of these books and the authors in "Basler Fussballarchiv" have failed to be able to identify all the players, their date and place of birth or date and place of death, who played in the games during the early years of FC Basel)
