= Marcel Kunz =

Swiss footballer (1943–2017)

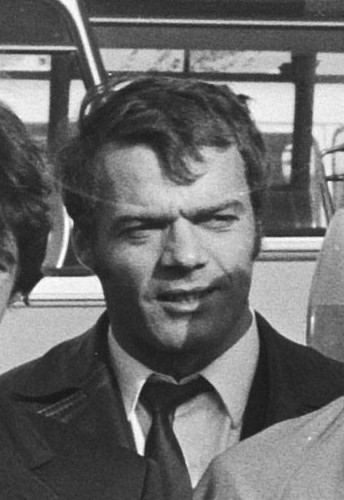
- Marcel Kunz in 1970

Personal information
- Date of birth: 24 May 1943
- Place of birth: Gerlafingen, Switzerland
- Date of death: 22 July 2017 (aged 74)
- Place of death: Basel, Switzerland
- Position: Goalkeeper

Youth career
- –1962: FC Gerlafingen

Senior career*
Years	Team	Apps	(Gls)
1962–1963	FC Gerlafingen		
1963–1975	FC Basel	200	(0)
1975–1976	Nordstern Basel	10	(0)

International career
1967–1971	Switzerland	14	(0)

Managerial career
- 1976–1977: FC Langenthal
- * Club domestic league appearances and goals

Marcel Kunz (24 May 1943 – 22 July 2017) was a Swiss footballer who played as a goalkeeper.

== Career ==
=== Club ===
Born in Gerlafingen, Kunz started his football with the youth teams of the local football club FC Gerlafingen, advancing to their first team in summer 1962. One year later he was signed by Basel for their 1963–64 season under head coach Jiří Sobotka. Kunz came as reserve goalkeeper behind Kurt Stettler, who had been the team's goalkeeper since 1957 and who stayed as first choice goalkeeper until 1965. Kunz made his very first appearance for the team on 10 August 1963 in a friendly game against FC Gerlafingen to say thank you for the transfer, which FCB won 4–1. Kunz played his domestic league debut for Basel on 8 September 1963 in the 1–0 away win against Grenchen. In his fourth league match, in April 1964, he broke his arm during the game against Schaffhausen, which forced him out of the game for some time.

To the beginning of the 1965–66 season Helmut Benthaus transferred in from 1. FC Köln and became FCB's player-coach. He replaced Jiří Sobotka as team manager. Benthaus consolidated the internal goalkeeping hierarchy, after Sobotka had never been able to make a clear decision between Jean-Paul Laufenburger, Hans-Ruedi Günthardt and Kunz in the previous season. From here on, Kunz was number 1 between the posts and it remained that way for the following ten seasons, even if Laufenburger and later the young up-and-coming Hans Müller were also very reliable when there was a change due to injury or for reasons of form.

Kunz won the Swiss championship title for the first time in Basel's 1966–67 season. Basel finished the championship one point clear of FC Zürich who finished in second position. Basel won 16 of the 26 games, drawing eight, losing twice, and they scored 60 goals conceding just 20 and Kunz held a clean sheet on 12 occasions. In that season Kunz won the double with Basel. In the Cup final on 15 May 1967 Basel's opponents were Lausanne-Sports. In the former Wankdorf Stadium, Helmut Hauser scored the decisive goal via penalty. The game went down in football history due to the sit-down strike that followed this goal. After 88 minutes of play, with the score at 1–1, referee Karl Göppel awarded Basel a controversial penalty. André Grobéty had pushed Hauser gently in the back and Hauser let himself drop theatrically. Subsequently, after the 2–1 lead for Basel the Lausanne players refused to resume the game and they sat down demonstratively on the pitch. The referee had to abandon the match. Basel were awarded the cup with a 3–0 forfait.

Kunz won his second title in Basel's 1968–69 season. Basel finished the championship just one point clear of second placed Lausanne-Sports. Basel won 13 of the 26 games, drawing ten, losing three times, they scored 48 goals conceding 28 and Kunz held a clean sheet on seven times in 18 outings. Kunz won the championship with Basel for the third time season 1969–70. The team again finished one point clear of Lausanne-Sports who ended in second position. Basel won 15 of the 26 games, drawing seven, losing four times, they scored 59 goals conceding 23 and Kunz held a clean sheet 10 times in his 26 appearances. In 1971–72 Kunz won the championship for the fourth time. Basel ended the season four points ahead of Zürich. Of the 26 league games Basel won 18, drawing seven, losing just once, scoring 66 goals conceding 28 and Kunz held a clean sheet on eight occasions. Kunz won the Swiss championship title for the fifth time in the 1972–73 Nationalliga A season. Basel won the championship four points ahead of Grasshopper Club. Basel won 17 of their 26 league games, drew five and lost four. They scored a total of 57 goals conceding 30. Kunz held a clean sheet six times in his 18 outings.

The 1972 Swiss League Cup was the inaugural Swiss League Cup competition. It was played in the summer of 1972 as a pre-season tournament to the 1972–73 Swiss football season. Basel beat Servette 8–0, Lausanne Sports 2–1 aet and Sion 6–1 to reach the final. This was won by Basel who defeated FC Winterthur 4–1 in the final which took place on 11 November 1972 at the Letzigrund in Zürich. Ottmar Hitzfeld scored a hattrick in the final. A further curious fact to this final is that Kunz stood between the posts for the first half and Jean-Paul Laufenburger was goalie for the second half.

In addition to the five championship titles that he won, there were five cup finals in which Kunz was number 1 goalie in the FCB team. In his first cup final participation, mentioned above, against Lausanne-Sports and in his last in 1975, as Basel beat Winterthur 2–1 after extra time, he was part of the winning team. However, in between there were the three cup final defeats against FCZ, in all of which, Kunz suffered.

Between the years 1963 and 1975 Kunz played a total of 373 games for Basel. 200 of these games were in the Swiss Super League, 47 in the knock-out competitions (Swiss Cup and Swiss League Cup ) 36 in the UEFA competitions (European Cup, UEFA Cup, Inter-Cities Fairs Cup and Cup of the Alps) and 90 were friendly games.

After his career with FC Basel, Kunz played another season with Nordstern Basel in the Nationalliga B and then retired from active football completely. The following seasons he worked as coach for the amateur clubs FC Langenthal, FC Oberwil, FC Riehen, FC Nordstern und SC Kleinhüningen.

=== International ===
Kunz was called up by trainers Alfredo Foni and Erwin Ballabio into the Switzerland national football team as successor to Karl Elsener. Although Kunz was relatively small for a goalkeeper, which was also true of many of his colleagues at that time such as Karl Grob, Jean-Claude Donzé and others, he was repeatedly called up for the Swiss senior national team. Mario Prosperi (Lugano) was seeded there in those years and there were other strong competitors such as Karl Grob (FCZ), Jacques Barlie (Servette) and René Deck (GC). Nevertheless, Kunz made 14 international appearances between 1967 and 1971.

He played his debut for Switzerland on 24 May 1967 in the Hardturm, in Zürich, in front of 21,337 spectators in the legendary 7–1 win against Romania. He played his last game for his country on 13 October 1971 in St. Jakob Stadium, in front of 47,877 spectators, under coach Louis Maurer. The Euro 1972 qualifying game ended with a 2–3 defeat against England.

== Personal life ==
Even to his playing times Kunz was employee of Ankerbrauerei, a brewery in Frenkendorf. The Ankerbrauerei was taken over by Feldschlösschen and after his football career Kunz devoted himself entirely to his profession career as sales representative for the Feldschlösschen AG. Right up until his retirement, Kunz remained faithful to the brewery in Rheinfelden. In 1968 Kunz married Sylvia Dienst, a daughter of the legendary referee Gottfried Dienst. They had two children, daughter Corinne and son Sascha, and they lived in Riehen bei Basel which, until his death, remained the home of the Kunz family.

In July 2017 FC Basel announced that their former goalkeeper had died on 22 July 2017 in the Basler Clara Hospital after a long illness.

== Honours ==
Basel

- Swiss League champions: 1966–67, 1968–69, 1969–70, 1971–72, 1972–73
- Swiss Cup winner: 1966–67, 1974–75
- Swiss Cup runner-up: 1969–70, 1971–72, 1972–73
- Swiss League Cup winner: 1972
- Coppa delle Alpi winner: 1969, 1970
- Uhren Cup winner: 1969, 1970

== Sources ==
- Josef Zindel (2018). FC Basel 1893. Die ersten 125 Jahre (in German). Basel: Friedrich Reinhardt Verlag. ISBN 978-3-7245-2305-5.
- Rotblau: Jahrbuch Saison 2015/2016. Publisher: FC Basel Marketing AG. ISBN 978-3-7245-2050-4
- Verein "Basler Fussballarchiv" Homepage
- A list of Swiss Cup Finals at RSSSF
