= Horst Lunenburg =

German footballer

Personal information
- Full name: Horst Lunenburg
- Date of birth: 18 January 1943 (age 83)
- Place of birth: Germany
- Position: Striker

Senior career*
Years	Team	Apps	(Gls)
1966–1970	Tennis Borussia Berlin		
1971–1977	SC Wacker 04 Berlin	63	(18)
- * Club domestic league appearances and goals

Horst Lunenburg (born 18 January 1943) is a former German footballer.

Lunenburg made 63 appearances in the 2. Bundesliga during his playing career.
