= Aldo Moscatelli =

Swiss footballer (1939-2015)

Personal information
- Full name: Aldo Moscatelli
- Date of birth: 2 November 1939
- Date of death: 15 April 2015 (aged 75)
- Place of death: St. Gallen
- Positions: Midfielder; striker

Youth career
- –1960: Luzern

Senior career*
Years	Team	Apps	(Gls)
1960–1964	Luzern	55	(14)
1964–1967	Basel	47	(8)
1967–1968	Lugano	16	(2)
1968–1971	St. Gallen	52	(6)
1971–1973	SC Brühl	28	(2)
- * Club domestic league appearances and goals

Aldo Moscatelli (2 November 1939 – 15 April 2015) was a Swiss footballer who played for Luzern, Basel, St. Gallen and Brühl St. Gallen during the 1960s and early 70s. He played mainly in the position of striker, but also very often as midfielder.

== Football career ==
Moscatelli played his youth football by local club FC Luzern and advanced to their first team in the summer of 1960. He made his Nationalliga A debut for Luzern during the 1960–61 season. In that season he played 17 domestic league matches, scoring one goal as Luzern ended the season in eighth position in the league table. In the following two Seasons Moscatelli was troubled by injuries and so did not come to many league appearances, but in the following he showed his goal scoring qualities, scoring eight times in 22 outings.

The then aspiring FC Basel soon became aware of him, they made an offer and the transfer was completed ahead of their 1964–65 season. Moscatelli joined Basel's first team under the Czechoslovak head coach Jiří Sobotka. In June Moscatelli played two matches for his new team in the Cup of the Alps, scoring one goal for them, but it could not help them, as Basel lost the match 5–2 against Italian team Genoa. After playing in five further test games, Moscatelli played his domestic league debut for his new club on 26 August 1964 in the away game against Biel-Bienne. He scored his first league goal for the team during that same game. It was the last goal of the match, but it was not enough to prevent the 2–3 defeat.

In the 1966–67 Nationalliga A season Basel won the championship under player-manager Helmut Benthaus. Basel finished the championship one point clear of FC Zürich who finished in second position. Basel won 16 of the 26 games, drawing eight, losing twice, and they scored 60 goals conceding just 20. During that season Moscatelli played 17 league matches, scoring three goals. In that season Basel won the double. In the Cup final on 15 May 1967 Basel's opponents were Lausanne-Sports. In the former Wankdorf Stadium, Basel took an early lead through a goal by Helmut Hauser. The equaliser happened two minutes after the half-time break, Josef Kiefer unluckily deflected a free kick from Lausanne's Richard Dürr into his own goal. Hauser scored the decisive goal via penalty. But the game went down in football history due to the sit-down strike that followed this goal. After 88 minutes of play, with the score at 1–1, referee Karl Göppel awarded Basel a controversial penalty. André Grobéty had pushed Hauser gently in the back and Hauser let himself drop theatrically. Subsequently, after the 2–1 lead for Basel the Lausanne players refused to resume the game and they sat down demonstratively on the pitch. The referee had to abandon the match. Basel were awarded the cup with a 3–0 forfait.

Between the years 1964 and 1967 Moscatelli played a total of 95 games for Basel scoring a total of 27 goals. 47 of these games were in the Nationalliga A, 12 in the Swiss Cup, 11 were on European level (Cup of the Alps, Inter-Cities Fairs Cup) and 25 were friendly games. He scored 8 goals in the domestic league, three in the Swiss Cup, one in the Cup of the Alps and the other 15 were scored during the test games.

After his time in Basel, Moscatelli played the 1967–68 season for FC Lugano. At the end of the season Lugano the Swiss Cup as they beat Winterthur 2–1 in the final.

After 18 years in the second tier of Swiss football, FC St. Gallen had just achieved promotion to the highest league and the new Espenmoos stadium was under reconstruction. St.Gallen played in the Krontal, the sports field of their local rivals SC Brühl and they were looking to strengthen their team, so Moscatelli joined them. In that season's Swiss Cup FCSG reached the final. With victories over Lugano away in the quarter-final and Servette at home in the semi-final, they had knocked two of the then greats of Swiss football out of the knockout competition. Head coach Albert Sing nominated Moscatelli for starting team for this final, which was held on 26 May 1969 in the Wankdorf Stadium in Bern. Rudolf Nafziger scored both goals as St. Gallen won the final 2–0 against Bellinzona to lift the trophy.

In the 1969–70 season FCSG suffered relegation. Moscatelli remained with the team and the next season they achieved immediate promotion as division champions. However, then he was no longer first choice for the team and at the end of following season Moscatelli moved on.

From 1971 to 1973, Moscatelli ended his football career with the then NLB club SC Brühl.

== Private life ==
Aldo Moscatelli grew up in Luzern and following his move from the Canton of Ticino to St. Gallen he remained in North-East Switzerland. Moscatelli professional qualification was as Banking expert. For more than 30 years he worked as an employee at the headquarters of the St. Gallen Cantonal Bank. Moscatelli married and the couples two sons Mario and Rinaldo also played football. Aldo Moscatelli died unexpectedly in St. Gallen on 15 April 2015 at the age of 75.

== Honours ==
Basel

- Swiss League champions: 1966–67
- Swiss Cup winner: 1966–67

Lugano

- Swiss Cup winner: 1967–68

St. Gallen

- Swiss Cup winner: 1968–69

== Sources ==
- Josef Zindel (2018). FC Basel 1893. Die ersten 125 Jahre (in German). Basel: Friedrich Reinhardt Verlag. ISBN 978-3-7245-2305-5.
- Rotblau: Jahrbuch Saison 2017/2018. Publisher: FC Basel Marketing AG. ISBN 978-3-7245-2189-1
- Verein "Basler Fussballarchiv" Homepage
