= Mario Grava =

French footballer (born 1940)

Personal information
- Full name: Mario Grava
- Date of birth: 1940 (age 85–86)
- Place of birth: Italie
- Position: Forward

Senior career*
Years	Team	Apps	(Gls)
1964–1965	FC Basel	8	(3)
- * Club domestic league appearances and goals

Mario Grava (born in 1941) is a French former footballer who played in the 1960s as forward.

Grava joined FC Basel's first team for their 1964–65 season under manager Jiří Sobotka. He played his domestic league debut for the club in the home game at the Landhof on 30 August 1964 as Basel won 2–0 against Grenchen. He scored his first goal for his club on 25 October in the home game as Basel won 3–0 against Bellinzona.

In his one season with the club, Grava played a total of 15 games for Basel scoring a total of six goals. Eight of these games were in the Nationalliga A, one in the Swiss Cup, two in the Inter-Cities Fairs Cup and four were friendly games. He scored three goals in the domestic league, one was scored during the test games and the other two were scored in the 1964–65 Inter-Cities Fairs Cup match on 9 September against CA Spora Luxembourg.

== Sources ==
- Die ersten 125 Jahre. Publisher: Josef Zindel im Friedrich Reinhardt Verlag, Basel. ISBN 978-3-7245-2305-5
- Verein "Basler Fussballarchiv" Homepage

(NB: Despite all efforts, the editors of these books and the authors in "Basler Fussballarchiv" have failed to be able to identify all the players, their date and place of birth or date and place of death, who played in the games during the early years of FC Basel)
