= Radivoje Ognjanović =

Serbian footballer (1933–2011)

Personal information
- Date of birth: 1 July 1933
- Place of birth: Šašinci, Yugoslavia (now Serbia)
- Date of death: 30 August 2011 (aged 78)
- Place of death: Belgrade, Serbia
- Height: 1.79 m (5 ft 10 in)
- Position: Forward

Youth career
- Srem

Senior career*
Years	Team	Apps	(Gls)
1952–1953	Partizan	10	(1)
1953–1961	Radnički Beograd	153	(61)
1961–1962	Partizan	9	(1)
1962–1963	Red Star Belgrade	11	(2)
1963–1964	Sturm Graz	16	(1)
1964–1965	Basel	15	(6)
1965–1966	Grenchen	21	(7)
1966–1967	Moutier	18	(4)
Total		253	(83)

International career
1957–1959	Yugoslavia	5	(1)

Managerial career
- 1977–1978: Vrbas
- 1982–1984: Cameroon
- 1989–1992: Ivory Coast
- 1993–1994: China U23
Medal record
Men's football
Representing Cameroon(as manager)
Africa Cup of Nations
Winner	1984 Ivory Coast
- * Club domestic league appearances and goals

Radivoje Ognjanović (Serbian Cyrillic: Радивоје Огњановић; 1 July 1933 – 30 August 2011) was a Serbian football manager and player.

== Club career ==
After briefly playing for Partizan, Ognjanović made a name for himself at Radnički Beograd, totaling 153 appearances and scoring 61 goals for the club in the Yugoslav First League between 1953 and 1961.

Ognjanović joined Basel's first team for their 1964–65 season under head coach Jiří Sobotka. After playing in one test game Ognjanović played his domestic league debut for his new club in the home game in the Landhof on 13 December 1964 as Basel were defeated 2–3 by Servette. He scored his first goal for the club, just three days later, on 16 December, in the away game in the Olympique de la Pontaise as Basel won 2–1 against Lausanne-Sport.

He played just this one season with the club and during this time Ognjanović played a total of 22 games for Basel scoring a total of 8 goals. 15 of these games were in the Nationalliga A, 2 in the Swiss Cup and 5 were friendly games. He scored 6 goals in the domestic league and the other 2 were scored during the test games.

Ognjanović moved on and played one season for Grenchen and one more for Moutier and then he retired from active football.

== International career ==
At international level, Ognjanović was capped five times for Yugoslavia between 1957 and 1959, scoring once. He was a member of the team at the 1958 FIFA World Cup.

== Managerial career ==
After hanging up his boots, Ognjanović served as manager of several clubs and national teams, most notably Cameroon and Ivory Coast.

== Personal life ==
Ognjanović died on 30 August 2011, at the age of 78.

== Honours ==
=== Player ===
Partizan

- Yugoslav First League: 1961–62
- Yugoslav Cup: 1952

=== Manager ===
Cameroon

- African Cup of Nations: 1984

== Sources ==
- Die ersten 125 Jahre. Publisher: Josef Zindel im Friedrich Reinhardt Verlag, Basel. ISBN 978-3-7245-2305-5
- Verein "Basler Fussballarchiv" Homepage
