= Heinz Sartor =

German footballer

Personal information
- Full name: Heinz Sartor
- Date of birth: 27 February 1940 (age 86)
- Position: Striker

Senior career*
Years	Team	Apps	(Gls)
1960–1962	CSC 03 Kassel		
1962–1963	SV Viktoria 1901 Aschaffenburg		
1963–1964	Phönix Ludwigshafen		
1964–1965	FC Basel	3	(1)
1965–1970	Offenburger FV		

Managerial career
- 1985–1986: Offenburger FV
- * Club domestic league appearances and goals

Heinz Sartor (born 27 February 1940) is a German former footballer who played in the 1960s as a forward.

Sartor played at least two seasons for CSC 03 Kassel. Then he played the season 1962–63 for SV Viktoria 1901 Aschaffenburg and the season 1963–64 for Phönix Ludwigshafen.

Sartor joined FC Basel's first team for their 1963–64 season under manager Jiří Sobotka. After playing in five test games Sartor played his domestic league debut for his new club in the first league game of the season on 23 August as Basel lost 2–3 against Biel-Bienne. He scored his first goal for his club one week later, on 30 August, in the home game at the Landhof, a penalty, as Basel won 2–0 against Grenchen.

In his one season with the club, Sartor played eight games for Basel scoring six goals. Three of the games were in the Nationalliga A and five were friendly games. He scored one goal in the domestic league and the other five were scored during the test games.

Following his time in Basel Sartor returned to Germany and joined Offenburger FV. He played there for four seasons before he ended his playing career. He later became trainer and spent one season as trainer of their first team.

== Sources ==
- Die ersten 125 Jahre. Publisher: Josef Zindel im Friedrich Reinhardt Verlag, Basel. ISBN 978-3-7245-2305-5
- Verein "Basler Fussballarchiv" Homepage
