= Hansruedi Günthardt =

Swiss footballer (1931–2005)

Personal information
- Full name: Hansruedi Günthardt
- Date of birth: 18 October 1931
- Date of death: 6 September 2005 (aged 73)
- Place of death: Basel
- Height: 1.85 m (6 ft 1 in)
- Position: Goalkeeper

Senior career*
Years	Team	Apps	(Gls)
until 1962	SC Kleinhüningen		
1962–1969	FC Basel	24	(0)
1969–	Old Boys		
- * Club domestic league appearances and goals

Hansruedi Günthardt (18 October 1931 – 6 September 2005) was a Swiss footballer who played for FC Basel in the 1960s asa goalkeeper.

== Football career ==
Günthardt started his early football years playing for FC Emmenbrücke, then for the reserve team of FC Luzern and later Lausanne-Sports, before he moved to Basel. At the age of 30 years Günthardt joined FC Basel in 1962 from SC Kleinhüningen. Jiří Sobotka was Basel manager at that time. Günthardt played his Nationalliga A debut on 7 October 1962 as Basel won their home game against Young Fellows Zürich 2–1. During the following seasons he was mainly second goalkeeper behind Swiss national keeper Kurt Stettler and later behind Marcel Kunz and Jean-Paul Laufenburger. From 1962 to 1969, Günthardt played a number of games for the reserve team and a total of 51 games for the FC Basel first team. 24 of these games were in the Nationalliga A, two in the Swiss Cup, four in the Cup of the Alps and 21 were friendly games.

A well-documented curiosity was the fact that during the winter break of their 1963–64 season the team travelled on a world tour. This saw them visit British Hong Kong, Malaysia, Singapore, Australia, New Zealand, French Polynesia, Mexico and the United States. First team manager Jiří Sobotka together with 16 players and 15 members of staff, supporters and journalists participated in this world tour from 10 January to 10 February 1964. Team captain Bruno Michaud filmed the events with his super-8 camara. The voyage around the world included 19 flights and numerous bus and train journeys. Club chairman, Lucien Schmidlin, led the group, but as they arrived in the hotel in Bangkok, he realised that 250,000 Swiss Francs were missing. The suitcase that he had filled with the various currencies was not with them. He had left it at home, but Swiss Air were able to deliver this to him within just a few days. During the tour a total of ten friendly/test games were played, these are listed in their 1963–64 season. Five wins, three draws, two defeats, but also three major injuries resulted from these test matches. A broken leg for Peter Füri, an eye injury for Walter Baumann and a knee injury for Bruno Michaud soon reduced the number of players to just 13. As reserve goalkeeper Günthardt was a member of this tour. He played in two of these games.

At the end of the 1968/69 season Günthardt went on to play for local rivals Old Boys, where he ended his active football. Following his active career, Günthardt took over the coaching position of the FCB "Reserves" (now known as the U21), which he led to several Swiss championship titles in this category. At the same time, he was something like the right hand of trainer Helmut Benthaus in this function, especially as at that time the position of assistant coach was commonly unknown as opposed to now.

== Private life ==
Günthardt married Malva and they had a daughter and a son. Professionally he was a carpenter and worked as caretaker for a Basler insurance company until he retired. He died on 6 September 2005 after a serious illness, which was a very painful time for him, therefore his death came as somewhat of a relief.

== Honours and Titles ==
Basel

- Swiss League champions: 1966–67
- Swiss Cup winner: 1962–63, 1966–67

== Sources ==
- Rotblau: Jahrbuch Saison 2017/2018. Publisher: FC Basel Marketing AG. ISBN 978-3-7245-2189-1
- Die ersten 125 Jahre. Publisher: Josef Zindel im Friedrich Reinhardt Verlag, Basel. ISBN 978-3-7245-2305-5
- Verein "Basler Fussballarchiv" Homepage
