= Markus Pfirter =

Swiss footballer (born 1939)

Personal information
- Full name: Markus Pfirter
- Date of birth: 23 September 1939
- Place of birth: Basel, Switzerland
- Height: 1.74 m (5 ft 9 in)
- Positions: Defender; midfielder

Senior career*
Years	Team	Apps	(Gls)
1957–1961	Concordia Basel		
1961–1968	FC Basel	143	(29)
1968–1972	St. Gallen	82	(1)

International career
1965–1968	Switzerland	9	(0)
- * Club domestic league appearances and goals

Markus Pfirter (* 23 September 1939) is a former Swiss footballer who played in the late 1950s, 1960s and early 1970s. He played mainly in the position as defender, but also as midfielder.

== Football career ==
=== Club ===
Pfirter played in the youth teams of Concordia Basel and in 1957 advanced to their first team, who at that time played in the Nationalliga B the second tier of Swiss football. But two years later they were relegated to the 1. Liga. Pfirter remained another two years with the club.

In the summer of 1961 Pfirter transferred to FC Basel for their 1961–62 season under manager Jiří Sobotka. Pfirter played his domestic league debut for his new club in the home game at the Landhof on 16 September 1961 as Basel were beaten 1–2 by Luzern. He scored his first league goal for his club on 11 November in the home game as Basel won 4–2 against Zürich.

A well-documented curiosity was the fact that during the winter break of their 1963–64 season the team travelled on a world tour. This saw them visit British Hong Kong, Malaysia, Singapore, Australia, New Zealand, French Polynesia, Mexico and the United States. First team manager Jiří Sobotka together with 16 players and 15 members of staff, supporters and journalists participated in this world tour from 10 January to 10 February 1964. Team captain Bruno Michaud filmed the events with his super-8 camara. The voyage around the world included 19 flights and numerous bus and train journeys. Club chairman, Lucien Schmidlin, led the group, but as they arrived in the hotel in Bangkok, he realised that 250,000 Swiss Francs were missing. The suitcase that he had filled with the various currencies was not with them. He had left it at home, but Swiss Air were able to deliver this to him within just a few days. During the tour a total of ten friendly/test games were played, these are listed in their 1963–64 season. Five wins, three draws, two defeats, but also three major injuries resulted from these test matches. A broken leg for Peter Füri, an eye injury for Walter Baumann and a knee injury for Bruno Michaud soon reduced the number of players to just 13. Pfirter was a member of this tour. He played in eight of these games, scoring one goal.

He played for Basel for seven seasons. During this time Basel won the Swiss Cup twice, in 1962–63 and again in 1966–67. In the 1966–67 Nationalliga A season Basel also won the championship, and thus the double, under trainer Helmut Benthaus. Between the years 1961 and 1968 Pfirter played a total of 263 games for Basel scoring a total of 54 goals. 143 of these games were in the Nationalliga A, 27 in the Swiss Cup, 28 in European competitions and 65 were friendly games. He scored 29 goal in the domestic league, 10 in the Cup and one in the International Football Cup. The other 14 were scored during the test games.

During the summer of 1968 Pfirter moved to St. Gallen. After the 1969–70 Nationalliga A season St. Gallen suffered relegation, but gained immediate promotion in the following season. Pfirter played four season for St. Gallen and after the 1971–72 Nationalliga A season Pfirter retired from active football.

=== International ===
Between 1965 and 1968 Pfirter played for the Swiss national team 9 times. He played his debut under team coach Alfredo Foni on 3 May 1965 in St. Jakob Stadium Basel as the Swiss lost 1–2 against Czechoslovakia.

== Honours and Titles ==
Basel

- Swiss League champions: 1966–67
- Swiss Cup winner: 1962-63, 1966–67

St. Gallen

- Swiss Cup winner: 1968–69
- Promotion to Nationalliga A: 1970–71

== Sources ==
- Rotblau: Jahrbuch Saison 2017/2018. Publisher: FC Basel Marketing AG. ISBN 978-3-7245-2189-1
- Die ersten 125 Jahre. Publisher: Josef Zindel im Friedrich Reinhardt Verlag, Basel. ISBN 978-3-7245-2305-5
- Verein "Basler Fussballarchiv" Homepage
