= Bruno Gabrieli =

Swiss footballer (born 1939)

Personal information
- Full name: Bruno Gabrieli
- Date of birth: 26 April 1939 (age 87)
- Place of birth: Binningen, Switzerland
- Position: Striker

Senior career*
Years	Team	Apps	(Gls)
1958–1962	Grasshopper Club Zürich	60	(15)
1963–1964	Nordstern Basel		
1964–1966	FC Basel	28	(1)
1966–1968	Grasshopper Club Zürich	4	(0)
- * Club domestic league appearances and goals

Bruno Gabrieli (born 26 April 1939) is a Swiss former footballer who played in the late 1950s and 1960s. He played mainly as a striker, but also as a midfielder.

Gabrieli played first for Grasshopper Club in the top tier of Swiss football. In 1963, he moved to live in Basel and then played for Nordstern two tiers lower.

Gabrieli joined FC Basel's first team at the end of their 1963–64 season under manager Jiří Sobotka. In this first season with the club, Gabrieli played in only three games in the Cup of the Alps during June 1964. In their 1964–65 season, after three test games, Gabrieli made his domestic league debut for his new club in the first league game of the season on 23 August as Basel lost 2–3 against Biel-Bienne. He scored his first goal for the club in the Swiss Cup on 1 November in the home game at the Landhof as Basel won 3–1 against FC Bern to advance to the next round. Gabrieli scored his first league goal for Basel on 21 November in a 5–1 win at home to Young Fellows Zürich.

One note must be made to a friendly match played in March 1965. The popular Basel captain of that time Hans Weber, played his very last game on 26 December 1964 in the quarter-finals of the Swiss Cup against Grasshopper Club because just seven weeks later he died of cancer. The friendly match on 31 March, in which Basel played against the Swiss national team, was staged as Hans Weber memorial. Gabrieli scored the last goal of the match, which Basel won 3–0.

Between the years 1964 and 1966, Gabrieli played 53 games for Basel, scoring seven goals. He played 28 games in the Nationalliga A, seven in the Swiss Cup, three in the Cup of the Alps, five in the 1964–65 Inter-Cities Fairs Cup and ten in friendly games. He scored one goal in the domestic league, one in the Swiss Cup and the other five during the test games.

Following his time in Basel, Gabrieli returned to the Grasshopper Club and ended his playing career here.

== Sources ==
- Rotblau: Jahrbuch Saison 2017/2018. Publisher: FC Basel Marketing AG. ISBN 978-3-7245-2189-1
- Die ersten 125 Jahre. Publisher: Josef Zindel im Friedrich Reinhardt Verlag, Basel. ISBN 978-3-7245-2305-5
- Verein "Basler Fussballarchiv" Homepage
