= Werner Decker =

Swiss footballer (1939-2017)

Personal information
- Full name: Werner Decker
- Date of birth: 16 July 1939
- Date of death: 12 June 2017 (aged 77)
- Place of death: Basel, Switzerland
- Position: Midfielder

Youth career
- Concordia Basel

Senior career*
Years	Team	Apps	(Gls)
until 1962	Concordia Basel		
1962	Zürich	1	(0)
1962–1964	Concordia Basel		
1964–1968	FC Basel	9	(0)
1968–1973	FC Laufen		

International career
- Swiss amateur national team

Managerial career
- 1972–1973: FC Laufen
- 1973–1975: Concordia Basel
- 1983–1984: Concordia Basel
- 1984–1986: FC Laufen
- 1993–1996: FC Münchenstein
- * Club domestic league appearances and goals

Werner Decker (16 July 1939 - 12 June 2017), commonly known as Pips, was a Swiss footballer who played for FC Concordia Basel, FC Zürich and FC Basel and the Swiss amateur national team. He played in the position as midfielder. In later years he became trainer and coach.

== Football career ==
Decker started his youth career by Concordia and at the age of 20 he advanced to their first team who at that time played in the Nationalliga B, the second highest tier of Swiss football. On the 16 October 1960 Concordia played as underdogs in the first round of the Swiss Cup against FC Basel and Decker scored the winning goal as Concordia won 2–1.

In the summer of 1962 Decker transferred together with Josef Hügi to Zürich. The two of them then played just two games together for their new Club, the 10–1 test game on 4 August 1962 win against FC Breite and the 1–9 championship defeat on 26 August against Lausanne-Sport (Hugi one championship game more) and then they both left the Club, Hügi to FC Porrentruy and Decker to return to Concordia.

In 1964 Decker transferred to FC Basel. He played mainly as captain of the reserve team, but also played in their first team. Between the years 1964 and 1968 Decker played a total of 42 games for Basel first team scoring a total of three goals. Nine of these games were in the Nationalliga A, two in the Swiss Cup, eight in the Cup of the Alps, four in the Inter-Cities Fairs Cup and 19 were friendly games. He scored the three goals during the test games. For a short period Decker was also captain of the Swiss amateur national team.

== Managerial career ==
After his time playing for FC Basel, Decker moved on to play for FC Laufen. He obtained his trainer diploma during this time and became player-manager for one year. He then returned to his initial club FC Concordia and took over the first team as manager for two seasons. During the following years he was also trainer of some local teams, amongst others FC Pratteln, before again returning for a second spell at Concordia. After this Decker coached FC Laufen for a second period and a few years later FC Münchenstein.

Even during his terms of management of all the other the local teams, Decker remained as youth trainer or simply as coach for many and various Concordia youth teams. In the early 1980s, he brought Ertan Irizik to Concordia first team and offered him an apprenticeship in his metal construction company Decker & Co. At some point he brought Irizik's half brother Murat Yakin into first team training, later Hakan. Hakan served his apprenticeship in Decker's company and Decker is considered as the discoverer of these top players.

== Private life ==
Decker completed his apprenticeship and worked as metal construction worker. He was long time owner, together with his first wife Johanna, of his own firm the metal construction company Decker & Co. in Münchenstein until his retirement in 2011. His firm supplied all the metal hand rails during the construction of the St. Jakob-Park. He was married twice. Werner Decker died on 12 June 2017 in an old people's home in Basel after a serious illness.

== Sources ==
- Rotblau: Jahrbuch Saison 2017/2018. Publisher: FC Basel Marketing AG. ISBN 978-3-7245-2189-1
- Die ersten 125 Jahre. Publisher: Josef Zindel im Friedrich Reinhardt Verlag, Basel. ISBN 978-3-7245-2305-5
- Verein "Basler Fussballarchiv" Homepage
