= Janos Konrad (footballer) =

Hungarian-Swiss footballer (born 1945)

Personal information
- Date of birth: 28 September 1945
- Place of birth: Hungary
- Positions: Midfielder; striker

Youth career
- –1963: FC Basel

Senior career*
Years	Team	Apps	(Gls)
1963–1970	FC Basel	18	(5)
1970–1973	Vevey Sports	46	(10)
1972–1973	Biel-Bienne	6	(1)
- * Club domestic league appearances and goals

Janos Konrad (born 28 September 1945) is a Hungarian–Swiss former footballer who played for FC Basel during the 1960s. He played for Vevey Sports and Biel-Bienne in the early 1970s. He played principally in the position as a striker, but also as midfielder.

== Career ==
Konrad played his youth football for FC Basel and advanced to their senior team in the 1963–64 season, but played mainly in their reserve team. He played his Nationalliga A debut on 13 September 1964 in the home game against Luzern that ended in a 2–2 draw. Just before half time in that game he scored his first goal for the club. Between the years 1963 and 1970 Konrad played a total of 39 games for Basel scoring a total of 10 goals. 18 of these games were in the Nationalliga A, two in the Inter-Cities Fairs Cup, five in the Cup of the Alps and 14 were friendly games. He scored five goals in the domestic league, one in the Fairs Cup, one in the Cup of the Alps and the other three were scored during the test games.

Following his time Basel Konrad moved to Vevey Sports who played in the Nationalliga B, second highest tier of Swiss football, for three seasons and then he moved to Biel-Bienne for another season.

== Sources ==
- Rotblau: Jahrbuch Saison 2017/2018. Publisher: FC Basel Marketing AG. ISBN 978-3-7245-2189-1
- Die ersten 125 Jahre. Publisher: Josef Zindel im Friedrich Reinhardt Verlag, Basel. ISBN 978-3-7245-2305-5
- Verein "Basler Fussballarchiv" Homepage
- Janos Konrad at WorldFootball.net
