= Jean-Paul Laufenburger =

French footballer (1943–2014)

Personal information
- Date of birth: 19 November 1943
- Place of birth: Mulhouse, France
- Date of death: 16 November 2014 (aged 70)
- Place of death: Village-Neuf, France
- Height: 1.78 m (5 ft 10 in)
- Position: Goalkeeper

Youth career
- –1962: Mulhouse

Senior career*
Years	Team	Apps	(Gls)
1962–1964	Sochaux-Montbéliard		
1964–1974	Basel	71	(0)
1974–1976	Mulhouse		
- * Club domestic league appearances and goals

Jean-Paul Laufenburger (19 November 1943 – 16 November 2014) was a French footballer who played as a goalkeeper.

== Career ==
Born in Mulhouse, Laufenburger started his football with the youth teams of the local football club Mulhouse, but he started his active career with Sochaux-Montbéliard in 1962.

After just two years with Sochaux, he signed a semi-professional contract with Basel and stayed with them for ten seasons. Laufenburger joined Basel's first team for their 1964–65 season under the Czechoslovak head coach Jiří Sobotka. The young Laufenburger was brought in as back-up goalkeeper to Marcel Kunz and the two of them shared the place between the posts during all this time, and by journeys to away games the two friends shared hotel rooms.

After playing in four test games Laufenburger played his domestic league debut for the club in the home game at the Landhof on 30 August 1964 as Basel won 2–0 against Grenchen. He injured himself during the second half and was substituted out in the 75th Minute. Fortunately it was only a small injury, just ten days later on 9 September, he stood in goal to play an Inter-Cities Fairs Cup match in the St. Jakob Stadium and his team won 2–0 against CA Spora Luxembourg.

During his FCB time, Laufenburger won the Swiss championship title five times. For the first time in Basel's 1966–67 season. In that season Laufenburger also won the double with Basel. In the Cup final in the former Wankdorf Stadium on 15 May 1967 Basel's opponents were Lausanne-Sports. Helmut Hauser scored the decisive goal via penalty. The game went down in football history due to the sit-down strike that followed that penalty goal. With the score at 1–1 after 88 minutes play, referee Karl Göppel awarded Basel a controversial penalty. After the 2–1 lead for Basel the Lausanne players subsequently refused to resume the game and they sat down demonstratively on the pitch. The referee was forced to abandon the match. Basel were awarded the cup with a 3–0 forfeit.

As well as the Swiss championship, Laufenburger also won the Swiss Cup and the Swiss League Cup. Between the years 1964 and 1974 he played a total of 167 games for Basel. 60 of these games were in the Swiss Super League, 11 in the Swiss Cup and the League Cup, 36 in the UEFA competitions (European Cup, Cup of the Alps and Inter-Cities Fairs Cup) and 60 were friendly games.

After his ten years with FC Basel, Laufenburger returned to and played a further two years for his youth club Mulhouse in the French Division 2, the first season as first choice keeper and the second as back up.

== Personal life ==
Laufenburger's nick name was "Bolle", not only to his family and friends, but he also called so by the Basel fan culture. He lived in Village-Neuf on the French side of the border by Basel. He was married to Agnès. Not only during his active playing time as a semi-professional goalkeeper, he worked as an electrician in Basel. Long before his normal retirement age, Laufenburger had to retire from professional life due to the outbreak of his illness (Parkinson's disease) and also give up his involvement with the FCB seniors. Jean-Paul Laufenburger lived with his illness for around 20 years, which was often painful for him and those close to him. On 16 November 2014, three days before his 71st birthday, Laufenburger died at home in Village-Neuf.

== Honours ==
Basel

- Swiss League: 1966–67, 1968–69, 1969–70, 1971–72, 1972–73
- Swiss Cup: 1966–67; runner-up: 1969–70, 1971–72, 1972–73
- Swiss League Cup: 1972
- Coppa delle Alpi: 1969, 1970
- Uhren Cup: 1969, 1970

== Sources ==
- Josef Zindel (2018). FC Basel 1893. Die ersten 125 Jahre (in German). Basel: Friedrich Reinhardt Verlag. ISBN 978-3-7245-2305-5.
- Verein "Basler Fussballarchiv" Homepage
