= Rolf Blättler =

Swiss footballer (1942–2024)

Personal information
- Date of birth: 24 October 1942
- Place of birth: Uster, Switzerland
- Date of death: 12 March 2024 (aged 81)
- Place of death: Minusio, Switzerland
- Positions: Midfielder; forward

Senior career*
Years	Team	Apps	(Gls)
1963–1969	Grasshoppers	143	(101)
1969–1971	Lugano	54	(26)
1971–1972	Basel	25	(9)
1972–1977	St. Gallen	110	(38)
1977–1979	Luzern		
1979–?	Locarno		

International career
1966–1973	Switzerland	28	(12)

Managerial career
- 1979–1984: Locarno
- 1984: Switzerland U23
- 1984–1986: Switzerland U21
- * Club domestic league appearances and goals

Rolf Blättler (24 October 1942 – 12 March 2024) was a Swiss footballer who played as midfielder or forward. At club level, he had stints at Grasshoppers, Lugano, St. Gallen, Luzern and Locarno. At international level, he made 28 appearances for the Switzerland national team scoring 12 goals. Blättler died in Minusio on 12 March 2024, at the age of 81.

== Club career ==
From 1963 to 1969 Blättler played for Grasshoppers. During the 1964–65 Nationalliga A season he scored 19 goals in 26 league games, becoming top scorer together with Pierre Kerkhoffs. He managed the title again during the following season with 28 goals and in the 1966–67 Nationalliga A season he won the title for the third time, this time jointly with Fritz Künzli.

Blättler then transferred for two years to Lugano. After which he spent the 1971—72 season with Basel and won the championship. During this season he played a total of 39 matches for Basel scoring 13 goals, of which 25 were league games in which he scored 9 goals. In 1972 Blättler transferred to St. Gallen where he stayed four seasons before he moved to Luzern.

== International career ==
Blättler played his debut for the Switzerland national team on 22 October 1966 in a test match against Belgium, in the Olympiastadion in Sint-Andries, Bruges. Switzerland lost 1–0. He scored his first two goals for his country on 24 May 1967 in the 7—1 win against Romania.

== Coaching career ==
In 1979 Blättler transferred to Locarno and became player-manager. He stayed trainer until 1984. Blättler was also coach of the Swiss U23 and the Swiss U21 teams.

== Honours ==
Basel

- Nationalliga A: 1971—72
