= Rudolf Scheurer =

Swiss football referee (1925–2015)

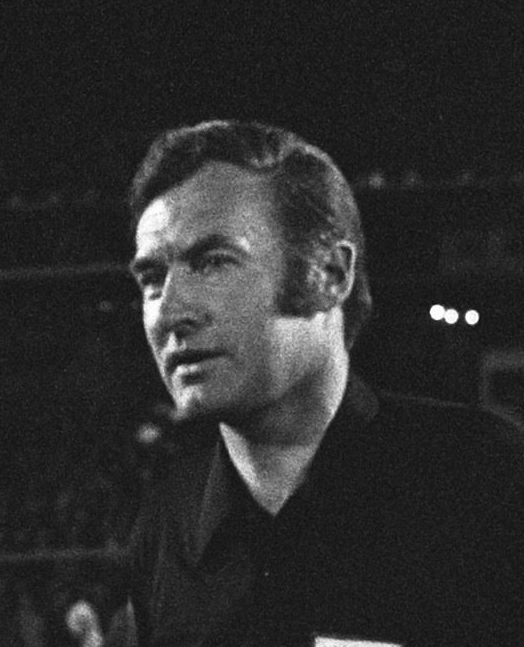
- Scheurer in 1973
- Born: 25 May 1925
- Died: 1 November 2015 (aged 90)

International
Years	League	Role
1967–1974	FIFA-listed	Referee

Rudolf Scheurer (May 25, 1925 – November 1, 2015) was a football referee from Bettlach, Switzerland. He is most remembered for supervising four FIFA World Cup matches – two in 1970 and two in 1974. At his peak, Scheurer was a high-profile referee: In 1970, he was nominated as linesman (assistant referee 1) in the final between Brazil and Italy. In 1974, he was awarded the opening game. Scheurer also whistled in 1970 and 1974 World Cup qualifiers, UEFA Euro 1972 qualifying, and many European club competition matches. After he retired from his active career, Scheurer served as chief of the Swiss soccer referees. He died on November 1, 2015.
