= Roberto Frigerio =

Swiss footballer (1938–2023)

Personal information
- Date of birth: 16 May 1938
- Place of birth: Le Havre, France
- Date of death: 9 April 2023 (aged 84)
- Place of death: Tenero, Switzerland
- Height: 1.82 m (6 ft 0 in)
- Position: Forward

Youth career
- until 1955: FC Chiasso

Senior career*
Years	Team	Apps	(Gls)
1954–1956	FC Chiasso	7	(4)
1956–1958	FC Schaffhausen	36	(12)
1958–1960	FC Basel	41	(16)
1960–1962	FC La Chaux-de-Fonds	41	(30)
1962–1963	FC Lausanne-Sport	23	(27)
1963–1968	FC Basel	103	(58)
1968–1971	AC Bellinzona	61	(18)
1971–1972	US Gambarogno	8	(0)
Total		320	(165)

International career
1962–1967	Switzerland	1	(0)
- * Club domestic league appearances and goals

Roberto Frigerio (16 May 1938 – 9 April 2023) was a Swiss professional footballer who played as a forward.

== Career ==
=== Early years ===
Frigerio played youth football for FC Chiasso. Aged just 16 years old, he made his Nationalliga A debut with their first team, on 6 March 1955, and he scored his first goal with them during the same game. It was the team's second goal as they won 2–0 in the Landhof against Basel. He stayed with the team for the 1955–56 season, in which he made six appearances scoring three goals. In the summer of 1956, he transferred to FC Schaffhausen, and although they suffered relegation at the end of the 1956–57 season, he stayed with them for the following season before moving on.

=== Basel ===
Frigerio joined Basel's first team for their 1958–59 season under manager Rudi Strittich. After playing in five test games, Frigerio played his domestic league debut for his new club in the away game on 31 August 1958 as Basel were beaten 2–1 by La Chaux-de-Fonds. He scored his first league goal for his new team on 28 December in the away game as Basel won 1–0 against Lugano. In the following season, on 20 March 1960 he scored his first hat-trick for Basel as they won the away league game 3–2 against Zürich.

=== La Chaux-de-Fonds, Lausanne-Sport ===
After two seasons with Basel, in the summer of 1960 Frigerio moved on to play for La Chaux-de-Fonds. They ended the league season in seventh position, but in the Swiss Cup LCdF advanced to final, which was played in the Wankdorf Stadium on 23 April 1961. Frigerio scored the only goal of the match, as LCdF won 1–0 against Biel-Bienne to lift the trophy. In the 1961–62 season the team ended in third position, Frigerio was the team's top scorer with 22 goals in 25 appearances, second highest league scorer behind Jacques Fatton with 25 goals. After two seasons with the LCdF, Frigerio moved on again. In summer 1962 he signed for Lausanne-Sport and in the 1963–64 the team won the Swiss Cup. Frigerio played with Lausanne for 18 months and then moved on.

=== Basel ===
In the winter break of Basel's 1963–64 season he returned to his former club under head coach Jiří Sobotka. A well-documented curiosity was the fact that during the winter break of their 1963–64 season, the team travelled on a world tour. This saw them visit British Hong Kong, Malaysia, Singapore, Australia, New Zealand, French Polynesia, Mexico and the United States. First team manager Jiří Sobotka together with 16 players and 15 members of staff, supporters and journalists participated in this world tour from 10 January to 10 February 1964. Team captain Bruno Michaud filmed the events with his Super 8 camera. The voyage around the world included 19 flights and numerous bus and train journeys. Club chairman, Lucien Schmidlin, led the group, but as they arrived in the hotel in Bangkok, he realised that 250,000 Swiss Francs were missing. The suitcase that he had filled with the various currencies was not with them. He had left it at home, but Swiss Air were able to deliver it to him within just a few days. During the tour, a total of ten friendly/test games were played; these are listed in their 1963–64 season. Five wins, three draws, two defeats, but also three major injuries resulted from these test matches. A broken leg for Peter Füri, an eye injury for Walter Baumann and a knee injury for Bruno Michaud soon reduced the number of players to just 13. Frigerio was a member of this tour. He played in 10 of these games and scored 10 goals.

Frigerio won the Swiss championship title in Basel's 1966–67 season. Basel finished the championship one point clear of FC Zürich, who finished in second position. Basel won 16 of the 26 games, drawing eight, losing twice, and they scored 60 goals, conceding just 20. Frigerio was the team's top goal scorer with 16 league goals. In that season Frigerio won the double with Basel. In the Cup final on 15 May 1967, Basel's opponents were Lausanne-Sports. In the former Wankdorf Stadium, Helmut Hauser scored the decisive goal via penalty. The game went down in football history due to the sit-down strike that followed this goal. After 88 minutes of play, with the score at 1–1, referee Karl Göppel awarded Basel a controversial penalty. André Grobéty had pushed Hauser gently in the back, and Hauser let himself drop theatrically. Subsequently, after the 2–1 lead for Basel, the Lausanne players refused to resume the game, and they sat down demonstratively on the pitch. The referee had to abandon the match. Basel were awarded the cup with a 3–0 forfait.

Between the years 1958 and 1960 and again from 1963 to 1968, Frigerio played a total of 256 games for Basel, scoring a total of 176 goals. 144 of these games were in the Nationalliga A, 23 in the Swiss Cup, 18 in the European competitions (Cup of the Alps, Inter-Cities Fairs Cup, European Cup) and 71 were friendly games. He scored 74 goals in the domestic league, 22 in the Swiss Cup, 7 in the European competitions and the other 73 were scored during the test games. The highest number of goals that he scored for Basel in a league match was four and this was on 29 October 1966 in the home game at the Landhof as Basel won 10–0 against FC Moutier. The highest number of goals that he scored for Basel in a test match was six. This was achieved twice, on 16.02.1966 in a 9-0 victory against Black Stars and in July by another 9–0 victory against local club FC Allschwil.

=== Final years ===
Following his time in Basel, Frigerio moved on to play three seasons for Bellinzona, and then he ended his professional career and joined local amateur club US Gambarogno, in a lower tier of Swiss football, where he ended his active football career.

=== International ===
Frigerio was nominated in the Swiss national squad for the 1962 FIFA World Cup, but he remained as an unused substitute on the bench in all three games. He played his debut for the country on 3 May 1967 as Switzerland lost their home game 21 to Czechoslovakia and this was to remain his only appearance for the team.

== Personal life and death ==
As the son of professional footballer Alessandro Frigerio, between 1932 and 1937 a Swiss international, Roberto was born in Le Havre, France, because his father played for Le Havre AC at that time. The family returned to Switzerland in 1939, due to the outbreak of the Second World War. Roberto was given the nickname "Mucho", as his father was given the same nickname before him, due to the number of goals that they scored. Frigerio died in Tenero, Switzerland, on 9 April 2023, at the age of 84.

== Honours ==
La Chaux-de-Fonds

- Swiss Cup: 1960–61

Lausanne-Sport

- Swiss Cup: 1963–64

Basel

- Swiss League: 1966–67
- Swiss Cup: 1966–67

== Sources ==
- Rotblau: Jahrbuch Saison 2015/2016. Publisher: FC Basel Marketing AG. ISBN 978-3-7245-2050-4
- Die ersten 125 Jahre. Publisher: Josef Zindel im Friedrich Reinhardt Verlag, Basel. ISBN 978-3-7245-2305-5
- Switzerland 1966–67 at RSSSF
