= Helmut Benthaus =

German footballer (born 1935)

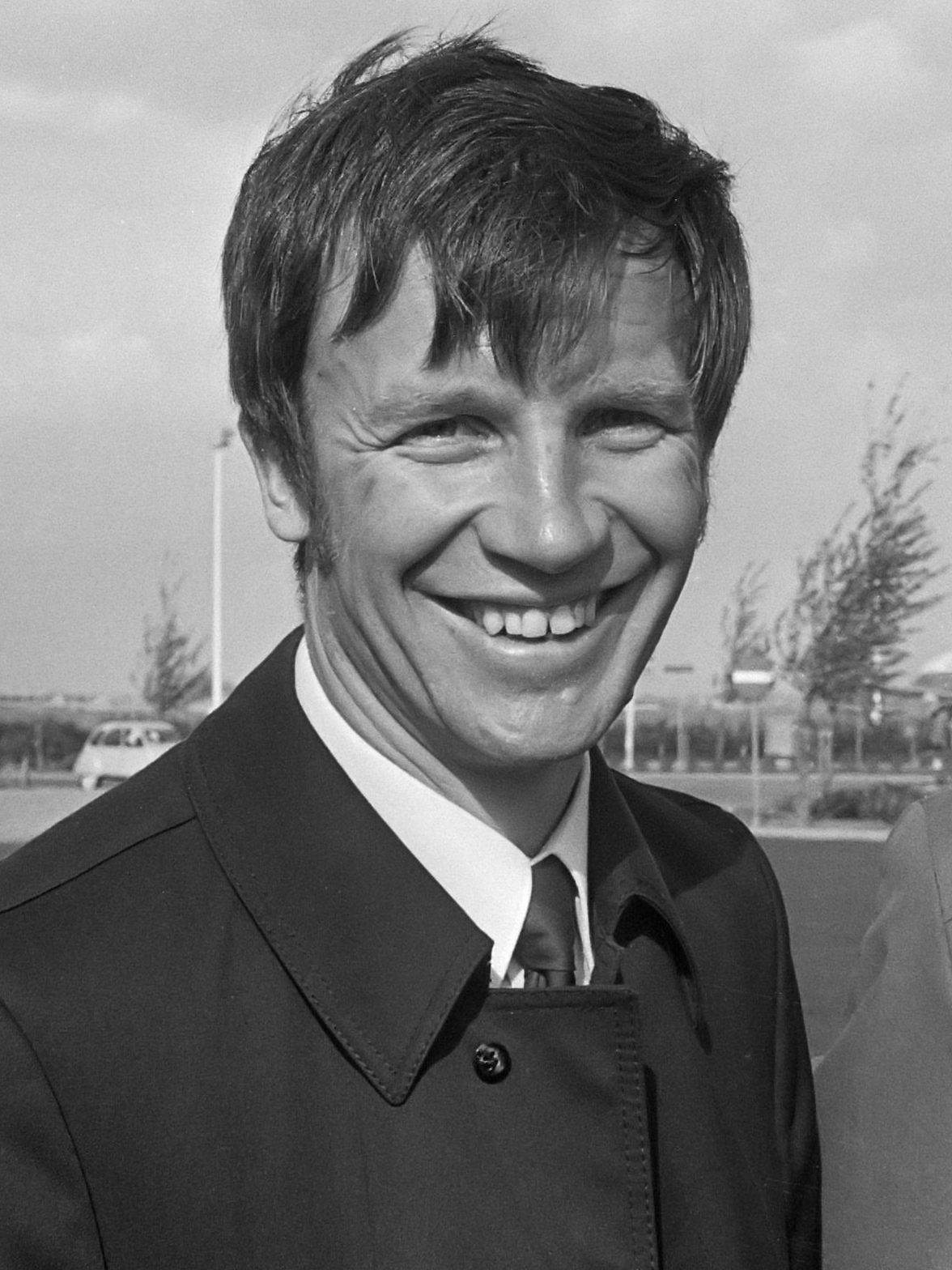
- Benthaus in 1970

Personal information
- Date of birth: 5 June 1935 (age 91)
- Place of birth: Herne, Germany
- Position: Midfielder

Youth career
- Westfalia Herne

Senior career*
Years	Team	Apps	(Gls)
1954–1961	Westfalia Herne	167	(19)
1961–1963	1860 Munich	18	(1)
1963–1965	1. FC Köln	52	(3)
1965–1971	FC Basel	112	(17)

International career
1958–1960	West Germany	8	(0)

Managerial career
- 1965–1982: FC Basel
- 1982–1985: VfB Stuttgart
- 1985–1987: FC Basel
- * Club domestic league appearances and goals

Helmut Benthaus (born 5 June 1935) is a German former football player and coach. He spent his best playing days at Westfalia Herne and his best coaching days at FC Basel.

== Early career ==
Born in Herne, Benthaus played youth football and started his professional career at Westfalia Herne in 1958. In 1959 he won the Oberliga West title but left just a year later to join 1860 Munich before moving to 1. FC Köln. He won the Oberliga West again in 1963 with Köln, then the German Bundesliga in 1964 and was Bundesliga runner-up in 1965. Benthaus played 38 matches in the West German top-flight after its introduction in 1963.

He played for the West Germany national team on eight occasions between 1958 and 1960. All matches were international friendlies.

== Player-manager for Basel ==
To the beginning of the 1965–66 season Benthaus transferred from Köln to FC Basel and was appointed as player-coach. He replaced Jiří Sobotka as team manager, who went on to manage the Switzerland national team.

Fourteen teams contested the 1965–66 Nationalliga A. Basel finished the season in sixth position with 27 points. They ended the championship with ten wins, seven draws and nine defeats in their 26 matches. They scored 64 goals and conceded 57. Team top league goal scorer was Roberto Frigerio with 15 goals. After playing seven test games Benthaus made his Swiss League debut on 22 August 1965 at the Landhof in the home match against FC UGS Genève. Basel won the game 4–1. He scored his first goal for the club in his eighth appearance, a home 3–1 win against Lugano. That season Benthaus played in 24 league matches and scored three goals.

In their 1966–67 season Basel became Swiss Champions for just the second time in their history. They won the Nationalliga A championship one point clear of both FC Zürich and FC Lugano who finished in second and third respectively. Basel won 16 of the 26 games, drawing eight, losing twice, and they scored 60 goals conceding just 20. Benthaus played in 18 league matches and scored three goals. In that season Basel won the double. Basel played an away match in the Stadio Cornaredo against FC Lugano in the semi-final which ended goalless and therefore a replay was required. The replay was played in the St. Jakob Stadium and goals from Karl Odermatt and Benthaus himself gave Basel a 2–1 victory to qualify for the final which was to take place three days later. In the Cup final Basel's opponents were Lausanne-Sports. In the former Wankdorf Stadium on 15 May 1967, Helmut Hauser scored the decisive goal via penalty. The game went down in football history due to the sit-down strike that followed this goal. After 88 minutes of play, with the score at 1–1, referee Karl Göppel awarded Basel a controversial penalty. André Grobéty had pushed Hauser gently in the back and he let himself drop theatrically. Subsequent to the 2–1 for Basel the Lausanne players refused to resume the game and they sat down demonstratively on the pitch. The referee had to abandon the match. Basel were awarded the cup with a 3–0 forfait.

As reigning champions, Basel played a mediocre season 1967–68 season. Although they were within reach of the table top the entire campaign, they messed everything up towards the end of the season as they lost five games out of seven. Therefore, they finished the season in fifth position. They were seven points behind the trio Zürich, Grasshopper Club and Lugano who all ended the season with 38 points. Basel won 13 of the league 26 games, drawing five, losing eight times, and they scored 49 goals conceding 33. Benthaus played in 23 league matches and scored three goals. In the Swiss Cup Basel started in the round of 32 with a home match against lower classed FC Le Locle, but the game had to go into overtime. After Le Locle took the lead just after half time break, Frigerio netted the equaliser shortly before the end. In the overtime player-manager Benthaus managed the winning goal. In the next round Basel played an away game against FC Zürich and were defeated 1–0 and the campaign was ended.

In their 1968–69 season Basel finished the Nationalliga A season as champions one point ahead of Lausanne Sports in second position. Basel won 13 of the 26 games, drawing ten, losing three times, they scored 48 goals conceding 28. Benthaus played in 12 league matches and scored one goal. In the Swiss Cup Basel started in the round of 32 with a win against Thun and in the round of 16 they beat Luzern. In the Quarter-final Basel played an away game against Servette but lost this 1–0. In the Inter-Cities Fairs Cup Basel were drawn against Bologna. Bologna won both games. In the 1968 Cup of the Alps the team managed to win the group and played in the final against FC Schalke 04 but were defeated 3–1 after extra time.

Benthaus won his third championship with Basel at the end of their 1969–70 season. The team again finished one point clear of Lausanne Sports who ended the season in second position again. Basel won 15 of the 26 games, drawing seven, losing four times, they scored 59 and conceded 23 goals. During this season Benthaus played 23 league matches and scored five goals. On 14 September 1969 Basel started in the Swiss Cup in the round of 32 with a 10–0 home win against Minerva Bern (as result of merger later renamed Breitenrain Bern). In the round of 16 played on 12 October Basel had a home match against Grenchen which was won 3–2. In the quarter-final, played in November, Basel had a two legged tie against Xamax-Sports NE (later renamed Neuchâtel Xamax). This was won 7–2 on aggregate. The semi-final was also a two legged tie and this against Servette Genève. Basel won both legs and 6–1 on aggregate. The final was played on 18 May 1970 in the Wankdorf Stadium, but was lost against Zürich after extra time. Benthaus played all seven Cup games. In the European Cup Basel were drawn against Scottish club Celtic. The first leg, which played on 17 September 1969 in the St. Jakob Stadium in front of 37,587 spectators, ended in a goalless draw. The return leg on 1 October in Celtic Park attracted 49,976 spectators. Celtic won the game 2–0 and advanced to the next round. Benthaus played both games. In the 1969 Cup of the Alps Basel won their group and in the final they beat Bologna 3–1 after extra time.

Towards the end of his playing career Benthaus stood on the side line as team manager and he only substituted himself into the game if it was not running as he wanted it. Benthaus played 11 games (two goals) in the 1970–71 FC Basel season, just four of which in the starting formation and seven as an inwards substitution. Basel won 18 of their 26 league games, drawing six, losing just twice and they scored 67 goals conceding 26. Basel completed the regular season level on points with Grasshopper Club Zürich. Therefore, the teams had to contest a play-off game. This took place on 8 June 1971 to decide the title winners. Grasshopper won the play-off 4–3 after extra time.

Basel started in the 1970–71 Swiss Cup in the round of 32 with a 5–1 home win against CS Chênois. In the round of 16 they had a home match against Bellinzona which was won 2–0. In the quarter-final they had an away tie against Mendrisiostar (after club merger later renamed FC Mendrisio-Stabio). However, this was lost 2–0 after extra time. Benthaus played only as a substitute in the match against Bellinzona. In the European Cup Basel were drawn against Spartak Moscow. The first leg, away from home, was lost 3–2 with Odermatt and Benthaus himself scoring for their team during the last 12 minutes of the game after they had gone three down. In the second leg played in the St. Jakob Stadium Basel won 2–1, the goals being scored by Urs Siegenthaler und Walter Balmer. Thus the tie ended 4–4 on aggregate. Basel won on away goals and advanced to the second round. Here they were drawn against Ajax, first away from home, but they suffered a 3–0 defeat. The second leg at home also ended with a defeat, 2–1, despite the fact that Odermatt put Basel one up with a penalty after 36 minutes. Benthaus played in all four European games.

In the Basel 1971–72 season Benthaus substituted himself in during just one single game. This being the second last home match of the season on 27 May against Luzern Basel won 18 league games, drew 7 and only suffered one defeat. They ended the season as Swiss Champions with 43 points, four points clear of second placed Zürich. The team scored 66 goals and conceded 28. In the Swiss Cup Basel advanced to the final, which was played on 22 May 1972 in the Wankdorf Stadium but they were defeated 1–0 by Zürich through a goal by Daniel Jeandupeux in extra time. In the 1971–72 UEFA Cup Basel were drawn against Real Madrid, but they were defeated in both games.

Benthaus retired from playing in 1971 aged 36. He played a total of 190 games for the club scoring a total of 34 goals. 112 of these games were in the Nationalliga A, 20 games were in the domestic cup, 13 were in European competitions (eight in the Champion Clubs' Cup and five in the Fairs Cup), eight in the Cup of the Alps and 37 were test games. 17 of his goals were in the domestic league, 3 were in the cup, 3 were in European competitions, 2 in the Coppa delle Alpi and the other 9 were in the tests.

== Coaching career for Basel ==
The 1972 Swiss League Cup was the inaugural Swiss League Cup competition. It was played in the summer of 1972 as a pre-season tournament to the 1972–73 Swiss football season. Benthaus coached the team to beat Servette 8–0, Lausanne Sports 2–1 aet and Sion 6–1 to reach the final. This was won by Basel who defeated FC Winterthur 4–1 in the final which took place on 11 November 1972 at the Letzigrund in Zürich. Ottmar Hitzfeld scored a hattrick in the final.

Again in their 1972–73 season Basel won the championship. The team won 17 games, drew five and were defeated four times. They scored 57 goals, conceding 30. Ottmar Hitzfeld was the team and the league top scorer with 18 goals. Basel won the championship four points clear of Grasshopper Club who finished in second position. In the Swiss Cup Basel reached the final, which was played on 23 April 1973 in the Wankdorf Stadium against Zürich. The game ended goalless after 90 minutes. In extra time Peter Marti (92) and Fritz Künzli (101) scored the goals to give Zürich the title for the second consecutive year in a final against Basel.

The following season was not very successful. In the 1973–74 season Basel finished the championship in fifth position, in the Swiss Cup they reached the quarter-finals. In the 1974–75 season the team finished championship in fourth position. But in the 50th edition of the Swiss Cup tournament they reached the final. The final was played on 31 March 1975 in the Wankdorf Stadium in Bern against Winterthur. The match went into extra time and Walter Balmer scored the winner after 115 minutes. Basel were Swiss Cup winners for the fifth time in the club's history.

Basel finished their 1975–76 season in third position in the table with 34 points, 10 points behind FC Zürich. In the Swiss Cup they only reached the round of 16 in the League Cup the semi-final. In the 1975–76 European Cup Winners' Cup they were knocked out by Atlético Madrid in the first round.

For Benthaus and his team the 1976–77 was again a very successful season. The league format was changed. Instead of 14 teams playing a single round robin, it now was reduced to 12 teams with a Qualifying phase and a championship round with the six top teams. This meant no longer 26 games, but now 22 plus 10. In the Qualifying phase Basel obtained 33 points and were just two points behind Servette. They managed to close the gap in the championship round and because both teams were level on points the championship was decided in a play-off match. This match was held on 26 June 1977. Basels goals were scored by Mundschin and von Wartburg as they won 2–1 and became Swiss champions. In the 1976–77 UEFA Cup Basel played first against Glentoran F.C., Basel won 5–3 on aggregate, then in the second round against Athletic Bilbao, here they were beaten 2–4 on aggregate.

In their 1977–78 season Benthaus and his team ended the qualification round in fourth position and ended the Championship Group in third position with 27 points, two behind Grasshopper Club and one behind Servette. In both domestic cups Basel reached the semi-finals. In the 1977–78 European Cup they were knocked out in the first round by Wacker Innsbruck.

During the season 1977–78 they ended the qualification round in fourth position and finished the Championship Group in sixth position with just 18 points, 17 behind championship winners Servette. In the Swiss Cup Basel reached the quarter-final and in the League Cup the final, here they were defeated by Servette after a penalty shoot out. In the 1978–79 UEFA Cup first round they were knocked out by VfB Stuttgart.

The 1979–80 season was an exiting season for Benthaus. After the Qualifying phase Servette, Grasshopper Club and Basel were within three points of each other. The close rivalry remained until the end of the season. In the second last game Basel were hosts to Servette, winning 1–0, and in the last away against Zürich, winning 4–2. Basel became champions and were two points ahead of both Grasshoppers and Servette who finished second and third respectively. The team scored 91 league goals during that league campaign. The team had three top goal scorers Detlev Lauscher and Erni Maissen Joseph Küttel, all three managed to score 18 league goals in that season. In both domestic cups Basel were knocked out in the early stages.

As reigning champions, Basel's 1980–81 season was a disappointing one. They ended the championship ranked sixth with just nine victories, ten drawn games and seven defeats. in both Cup campaigns they were knocked out at an early stage. But in the 1980–81 European Cup Basel over stood the first round beating Club Brugge 5–1 on aggregate. In the next round, however, they were knocked out by Red Star Belgrade 2–1 on aggregate, despite winning the first leg.

Also Basel's 1981–82 season was disappointing. Benthaus was first-team manager for the seventeenth consecutive season. The league championship format was expanded from the 1980–81 season to include sixteen teams. Basel ended the season in eighth position, 21 points behind Zürich who became champions. This was the lowest ranking since he had taken over. In their 30 league games Basel won eleven, drew six and lost thirteen matches, which meant that the totaled 28 points, scoring 47 goals and conceding 51. Basel entered into the Swiss Cup in the round of 64 and advanced to the final, but this was lost 1–0 against Sion. In the League Cup quarterfinal they were eliminated by Aarau. Basel were not qualified to play any of the European competitions, but they did enter the pre-season Cup of the Alps. They played together with Lausanne-Sport in Group A against Bordeaux and Bastia. Basel won the group and continued to the final, which was played on 29 September 1981 in Basel against Sochaux. They game ended 2–2 after extra time and Basel won on penalties.

Benthaus coached FC Basel for 17 years between 1965 and 1982. He won the Swiss Championship seven times, the Swiss Cup twice and the first edition of the Swiss League Cup that was held in 1972. He coached Basel's legendary team of the late 1960s and the 70s that won the Championship title six times (five of which in seven years) as well as the Cup in 1967 and 1975.

== VfB Stuttgart ==
After his time in Basel Benthaus joined German club VfB Stuttgart for the 1982–83 season. In his first season with his new club the team ended the championship with 48 points in third position in the league table, four points behind both Hamburger SV (champions) and Werder Bremen (runners-up). Stuttgart had won 20 games, drawn eight and had been beaten six times. In the 1983–84 season Benthaus and his team ended the season again with 48 points, level with Hamburg and Borussia Mönchengladbach. Stuttgart won championship with the better goal difference. Benthaus stayed in Stuttgart for another season, but the reigning champions ended the 1984–85 season in the second half of the league table in tenth position with 33 points.

== Return to Basel ==
Benthaus left Stuttgart in the summer of 1985 and rejoined Basel. In the meantime Basel had ended the three previous championships in the lower half of the table. In the previous season, during the winter break, manager Ernst August Künnecke was sacked and Emil Müller was appointed as caretaker manager up until the end of the season.

In their 1985–86 season Basel ended the championship in tenth position. in their 1986–87 season they finished in twelfth position and had to compete in the Nationalliga A/B Play-outs. They won these play-outs and remained in Nationalliga A. Benthaus retired at the end of this season.

== Managerial statistics ==
NOTE: The Cup of the Alps is not included as it is not classified as a competitive tournament.

Team	From	To	Record				
Team	From	To	M	W	D	L	Win %
Basel	1 July 1965	30 June 1982	616	346	115	155	56.17
Stuttgart	2 July 1982	30 June 1985	120	62	28	30	51.67
Basel	1 July 1985	30 June 1987	72	26	18	28	36.11
Total			808	434	161	213	53.71

== Honours ==
Westfalia Herne

- Oberliga West: 1958–59

1. FC Köln

- Oberliga West: 1961–62
- Bundesliga: 1963–64

Basel as player-manager

- Swiss League: 1966–67, 1968–69, 1969–70, 1971–72
- Swiss Cup: 1966–67, 1974–75
- Swiss League Cup: 1972
- Cup of the Alps winner: 1969, 1970
- Uhren Cup winner: 1969, 1970

Basel as manager

- Swiss League: 1972–73, 1976–77, 1979–80
- Swiss Cup: 1974–75
- Cup of the Alps winner: 1981

VfB Stuttgart

- Bundesliga: 1983–84
