= 1961–62 FC Basel season =

FC Basel
1961–62 season
- Chairman: Ernst Weber
- Manager: Jiří Sobotka
- Ground: Landhof, Basel
- Nationalliga A: 5th
- Swiss Cup: Quarter-final
- International Football Cup: Group stage
- Top goalscorer: League: Markus Pfirter (9); All: Josef Hügi (15)
- Highest home attendance: 14,000 on 15 October 1961 vs Servette
- Lowest home attendance: 1,500 on 4 March 1962 vs Fribourg
- Average home league attendance: 6,038

The 1961–62 season was Fussball Club Basel 1893's 68th season in their existence. It was their 16th consecutive season in the top flight of Swiss football following their promotion from the Nationalliga B the season 1945–46. They played their home games in the Landhof, in the Wettstein Quarter in Kleinbasel. Ernst Weber was the club's chairman for the third consecutive season.

== Overview ==
=== Pre-season ===
The former Czechoslovak footballer Jiří Sobotka was appointed as Basel's new team manager. Sobotka had been manager for La Chaux-de-Fonds from 1946 to 1959 and during this time had won the championship twice and the cup competition five times. He was manager for Feyenoord from 1959 to 1961 and had won the Dutch League with them in the season before he was hired by Basel. A number of older players left the squad. But quite a few new youngster were brought in to cover these empty places and Sobotka was well known for his work with the younger players. In fact all the new youngsters that joined the club lived within just a few minutes bus or tram ride from the Landhof stadium: Heinz Blumer lived in Reinach and advanced up from the junior team, local man Peter Füri joined the club from La Chaux-de-Fonds, Markus Pfirter joined from Concordia Basel, Otto Ludwig returned from Old Boys, Roland Denicola lived in Allschwil, René Burri in Birsfelden, Wilfried Fritz in Kandern and Hans-Ruedi Günthardt lived in Basel.

Basel played a total of 44 games this season. Of these 44 matches 26 were in the domestic league, four were in the Swiss Cup, six were in the newly formed International Football Cup and eight were friendly matches. Of these eight friendly games four were played at home and four away from home. Four games ended in a victory, three were drawn and one ended in a defeat. The friendly match against 1. FC Köln at the end of the season was one of the highlights of these test games, it ended in a 4–4 draw. This was the farewell game for Josef Hügi who was moving on to play for Zürich the following season. René Burri, Roberto Frigerio twice and Hügi himself scored the goals for Basel. Karl-Heinz Thielen, Christian Müller, Breuer and Helmut Benthaus scored the goals for Köln. 14,000 spectators paid their entrance tickets to see the game, much needed money because the club was suffering under a bad financial situation at that time. An interesting point to note was the contact that was made between the club's chairman, Ernst Weber, and the scorer of the final goal of the match, Benthaus. This contact would come in handy a few years later.

=== International Football Cup ===
Basel were appointed as one of four Swiss representatives in the newly founded IFC. The 1961–62 International Football Cup took place during the summer break. Basel played in Group B4 together with Sparta Rotterdam, IF Elfsborg and SC Tasmania 1900 Berlin but finished the group in the bottom position.

=== Domestic league ===
Fourteen teams contested the 1960–61 Nationalliga A, these were the top 12 teams from the previous season and the two newly promoted teams Lugano and Schaffhausen. The Championship was played in a double round-robin, the champions were to be qualified for 1962–63 European Cup and the last two teams in the table were to be relegated. The team played a mediocre season, but not much more was expected from the young team, manager Jiří Sobotka was forming the team for the future seasons. Basel finished the season in the mid-field region of the league table in 7th position with 28 points, 12 points behind Servette who won the championship for the second time in a row. Basel won ten games, drew eight and were defeated eight times. Youngster Markus Pfirter was the team's top league goal scorer with nine goals and oldie Josef Hügi scored eight times that season.

=== Swiss Cup ===
Basel entered the Swiss Cup in the third principal round. They were drawn at home against third tier club SR Delémont. Despite being 0–2 in arrear early in the game, they came back to win 3–2. In the fourth round they faced fourth tier local club FC Breite, with ex-FCB player Hans Hügi (who had retired from active football) in another home game. Older brother Hügi (I) defended against younger brother Hügi (II), but younger brother won the duel and scored two of the goals as Basel won 3–0 to continue to the next round. In the fifth round Basel won due to an own goal against Zürich, but in the quarter-final they were defeated by Bellinzona, who continued to the final, but here they were defeated by cup winners Lausanne-Sport after extra time.

== Players ==
The following is the list of the Basel first team squad during the 1961–62 season. The list includes players that were in the squad on the day that the Nationalliga A season started on 20 August 1961 but subsequently left the club after that date.

Note: Flags indicate national team as defined under FIFA eligibility rules; some limited exceptions apply. Players may hold more than one non-FIFA nationality.

No.	Pos.	Nation	Player
—	GK	SUI	Hans-Ruedi Günthardt
1	GK	SUI	René Jeker
1	GK	SUI	Kurt Stettler
—	DF	SUI	Heinz Blumer (new)
—	DF	SUI	René Burri (from FC Birsfelden)
—	DF	SUI	Peter Füri (from La Chaux-de-Fonds)
—	DF	SUI	Markus Pfirter (from Concordia Basel)
3	DF	SUI	Bruno Michaud
—	DF	SUI	Hanspeter Stocker
—	DF	SUI	Edmund Vogt
—	DF	SUI	Hans Weber
—	MF	SUI	Hansruedi Herr (from reserve team)

No.	Pos.	Nation	Player
6	MF	SUI	Carlo Porlezza
7	MF	SUI	Fernando Von Krannichfeldt
—	MF	SUI	Rudolf Rickenbacher (only IFC)
—	MF	SUI	Silvan Thüler
—	FW	SUI	Roland Denicola (new)
9	FW	SUI	Josef Hügi (II)
—	MF	GER	Otto Ludwig (from Old Boys)
—	FW	SUI	Hansueli Oberer
11	FW	SUI	Paul Speidel
—	FW	HUN	Ferenc Stockbauer (only UFC)
—	MF	SUI	Niklaus Stöckli (from reserve team)
—	MF	SUI	Wolfgang Walther (new)
—	MF	GER	Wilfried Fritz (new)

Players who left the squad

Note: Flags indicate national team as defined under FIFA eligibility rules; some limited exceptions apply. Players may hold more than one non-FIFA nationality.

No.	Pos.	Nation	Player
—	DF	SUI	Ulrich Vetsch (retired)
—	MF	SUI	Peter Brendle
—	MF	SUI	Jean-Louis Gygax
—	MF	SUI	René Jaeck

No.	Pos.	Nation	Player
—	MF	GER	Gerhard Siedl (to AZ Alkmaar)
—	MF	SUI	Jean-Claude Bourgnon
8	FW	SUI	Bernhard Chenaux
—	MF	SUI	Antonio Danani (to FC Moutier)
—	MF	SUI	Claus-Dieter Tabel (to reserve team)

== Results ==
Legend

Win Draw Loss Postponed

=== Friendly matches ===
==== Preseason ====
July 1961 Pre-season	Tus Lörrach-Stetten (Switzerland)	0–0	(Switzerland) Basel	Lörrach
		Summary
Note: Anniversary game 50 years Lörrach-Stetten

6 August 1961 Pre-season	Aarau (Switzerland)	3–2	(Switzerland) Basel	Hügeli, Schöftland
	Fragnières (1x); Gribi (1x); Crivelli (pen. 1x)	Summary	(1x) Von Krannichfeldt (1x) Denicola	Attendance: 3,000; Referee: (Switzerland) Gloor Schöftland

13 August 1961 Pre-season	FC Klus-Balsthal (Switzerland)	0–8	(Switzerland) Basel	Mühlefeld, Balsthal
		Summary	Goal	Attendance: 1,200; Referee: (Switzerland) Rudolf Scheurer Bettlach
Note: Anniversary game 50 years FC Klus-Balsthal

16 August 1961 Pre-season	FC Riehen (Switzerland)	2–6	(Switzerland) Basel	Riehen
18:30	Bieri (1:3); Raes (pen. 2:4)	Summary	(0:1) Hügi (II); 5' (0:2) Stocker; 35' (0:3) Hügi (II) (1:4) Hügi (II) (2:5) Wilfried Fritz (pen. 2:6) Hügi (II)	Attendance: 600

22 August 1961 Pre-season	Basel (Switzerland)	2–0	(Israel) Hapoel Tel Aviv	St. Jakob Stadium, Basel
20:00	Hügi (II) (1x); Walther (1x)	Summary		Attendance: 3,500; Referee: (Switzerland) Anton Bucheli Luzern

==== Winter break and end of season ====
11 February 1962 Winter break	Basel (Switzerland)	2–1	(Switzerland) Biel-Bienne	Landhof, Basel
15:00	Hügi (II) 1' (1:0); Hügi (II) 58' (2:0)	Summary	85' (2:1) Rossbach	Attendance: 1,100; Referee: (Switzerland) Oettlin Basel

16 May 1962 End of season	Basel (Switzerland)	1–1	(England) Scunthorpe United	Landhof, Basel
18:15	Burri 31' (1:0)	Summary	65' (1:1)	Attendance: 2,400; Referee: (Switzerland) Gottfried Dienst Basel

22 May 1962 End of season	Basel (Switzerland)	4–4	(Germany) 1. FC Köln	St. Jakob Stadium, Basel
20:00	Frigerio 27' (1:2); Burri 38' (2:3); Frigerio 82' (3:3); Hügi (II) 83' (4:3)	Summary	9' (0:1) Thielen; 22' (0:2) Müller; 34' (1:3) Breuer; 84' (4:4) Benthaus	Attendance: 14,000; Referee: (Switzerland) F. Schorer Interlaken
Note: Farewell game for Josef Hügi. Guest player by Basel: Frigerio

=== Nationalliga A ===
==== League matches ====
20 August 1961 Round 1	Basel	4–2	Biel-Bienne	Landhof, Basel
15:00	Blumer 41' (1:0); Blumer 47' (2:0); Von Krannichfeldt 72' (3:2); Walther 78' (4:2)	Summary	49' (2:1) Koller; 55' (2:2) Rossbach	Attendance: 6,000; Referee: (Switzerland) D. Mellet Lausanne

27 August 1961 Round 2	Lausanne-Sport	6–1	Basel	Olympique de la Pontaise, Lausanne
15:00	Glisovic 40' (1:0); Glisovic 48' (2:0); Vonlanden 54' (pen. 3:0); Glisovic 60' (4:0); Hosp 73' (5:0); Armbruster 74' (6:0)	Summary	77' (6:1) Weber	Attendance: 4,500; Referee: (Switzerland) Victor Werner Schicker Bern

2 September 1961 Round 3	Basel	2–1	Schaffhausen	Landhof, Basel
16:30	Stocker 23' (1:0); Hügi (II) 63' (2:1)	Summary	57' (1:1) Akeret	Attendance: 3,500; Referee: (Switzerland) Albert Weber Lausanne

10 September 1961 Round 4	Grasshopper Club	4–3	Basel	Hardturm, Zürich
	Vonburg 10' (1:0); Dimmeler 63' (2:3); Burger 78' (3:3); Ghilard (4:3)	Summary	17' (1:1) Wilfried Fritz; 40' (1:2) Wilfried Fritz; 51' (1:3) Hügi (II)	Attendance: 6,000; Referee: (Switzerland) Roland David Lausanne

16 September 1961 Round 5	Basel	1–2	Luzern	Landhof, Basel
16:15	Hügi (II) 1' (1:0)	Summary	13' (1:1) Lettl; 47' (1:2) Gerber	Attendance: 6,000; Referee: (Switzerland) Guinnard GletterensL

24 September 1961 Round 6	Fribourg	1–1	Basel	Stade Universitaire Saint-Léonard, Fribourg
	Froidevaux 10' (1:0)	Summary	86' (1:1) Hügi (II)	Attendance: 3,500; Referee: (Switzerland) Victor Werner Schicker Bern

1 October 1961 Round 7	Basel	0–2	Lugano	Landhof, Basel
15:00		Summary	50' (0:1) Ciani; 59' (0:2) Neuschäfer	Attendance: 5,000; Referee: (Switzerland) Albert Weber Lausanne

8 October 1961 Round 8	Grenchen	0–1	Basel	Stadion Brühl, Grenchen
		Summary	Wilfried Fritz 80' (0:1)	Attendance: 3,000; Referee: (Switzerland) Schurr Interlaken

15 October 1961 Round 9	Basel	1–1	Servette	St. Jakob Stadium, Basel
15:00	Walther 47' (1:0)	Summary	Robbiani 70' (1:1)	Attendance: 14,000; Referee: (Switzerland) Othmar Huber Thun

5 November 1961 Round 10	Young Fellows Zürich	1–0	Basel	Letzigrund, Zürich
15:00	Niggeler 33' (1:0)	Summary		Attendance: 6,000; Referee: (Switzerland) Anton Bucheli Luzern

11 November 1961 Round 11	Basel	4–2	Zürich	St. Jakob Stadium, Basel
18:00	Hügi (II) 23' (1:1); Denicola 36' (2:1); Pfirter 55' (3:2); Blumer 84' (4:2)	Summary	20' (pen. 0:1) Leimgruber; 43' (2:2) Fäh	Attendance: 3,000; Referee: (Switzerland) Victor Werner Schicker Bern

26 November 1961 Round 12	Young Boys	1–4	Basel	Wankdorf Stadium, Bern
	Meier 63' (1:4)	Summary	28' (0:1) Ludwig; 36' (0:2) Pfirter; 54' (0:3) Blumer; 63' (0:4) Ludwig	Attendance: 9,000; Referee: (Switzerland) Anton Bucheli Luzern

3 December 1961 Round 13	Basel	3–2	La Chaux-de-Fonds	Landhof, Basel
14:30	Pfirter 11' (1:1); Hügi (II) 19' (2:1); Oberer 43' (3:1)	Summary	5' (0:1) Trivellin; 67' (3:2) Frigerio	Attendance: 7,500; Referee: (Switzerland) Othmar Huber Thun

10 December 1961 Round 14	Biel-Bienne	4–4	Basel	Gurzelen Stadion, Biel/Bienne
	Treuthardt 33' (1:3); Bächler 60' (2:3); Bächler 67' (3:4); Bächler 85' (4:4)	Summary	15' (0:1) Pfirter; 18' (0:2) Hügi (II); 25' (0:3) Blumer; 67' (o.g. 3:4) Kehrli	Attendance: 2,000; Referee: (Switzerland) D. Mellet Lausanne

17 December 1961 Round 15	Basel	0–0	Lausanne-Sport	Landhof, Basel
14:30		Summary		Attendance: 7,500; Referee: (Switzerland) F. Schorer Interlaken

31 December 1961 Round 16	Schaffhausen	1–2	Basel	Stadion Breite, Schaffhausen
	Akeret 59' (1:1)	Summary	52' (0:1) Ludwig; 65' (1:2) Stocker	Attendance: 2,300; Referee: (Switzerland) Helbling Uznach

7 January 1962 Round 17	Basel	P – P	Grasshopper Club	Landhof, Basel
		[ Summary]

25 February 1962 Round 18	Luzern	1–1	Basel	Stadion Allmend, Luzern
	Lettl 70' (1:1)	Summary	52' (pen. 0:1) Stocker	Attendance: 3,500; Referee: (Switzerland) Josef Gulde St. Gallen

4 March 1962 Round 19	Basel	4–3	Fribourg	Landhof, Basel
15:00	Ludwig 18' (1:0); Burri 30' (2:1); Pfirter 56' (3:1); Oberer 75' (4:1)	Summary	20' (1:1) Laurito; 85' (4:2) Bongard; 88' (4:3) Laurito	Attendance: 1.500; Referee: (Switzerland) D. Mellet Lausanne

11 March 1962 Round 20	Lugano	2–2	Basel	Cornaredo, Lugano
	Ciani 15' (1:0); Ciani 30' (2:1)	Summary	27' (1:1) Pfirter; 60' (2:2) Füri	Attendance: 2,000; Referee: (Switzerland) Anton Bucheli Luzern

18 March 1962 Round 21	Basel	2–1	Grenchen	Landhof, Basel
15:00	Stocker 71' (pen. 1:1); Michaud 88' (2:1)	Summary	12' (0:1) Stutz	Attendance: 4,500; Referee: (Switzerland) Helbling Uznach

25 March 1962 Round 17	Basel	1–1	Grasshopper Club	Landhof, Basel
15:00	Oberer 47' (1:0); Oberer (yellow card)	Summary	66' (1:1) von Burg	Attendance: 7,500; Referee: (Switzerland) D. Mellet Lausanne

1 April 1962 Round 22	Servette	5–1	Basel	Charmilles Stadium, Geneva
15:00	Mantula 35' (1:1); Robbiani 54' (2:1); Bosson 64' (3:1); Robbiani 65' (4:1); Fatton 85' (5:1)	Summary	23' (0:1) Ludwig	Attendance: 9,000; Referee: (Switzerland) Zürrer Feldmeilen

8 April 1962 Round 23	Basel	2–2	Young Fellows Zürich	Landhof, Basel
15:00	Pfirter 28' (1:0); Blumer 41' (2:0)	Summary	51' (2:1) Zimmermann; 75' (2:2) Zimmermann	Attendance: 5,000; Referee: (Switzerland) Schwab Neuchâtel

15 April 1962 Round 24	Zürich	4–2	Basel	Letzigrund, Zürich
	Brizzi 23' (1:0); Brizzi 68' (2:0); Brizzi 72' (3:0); Martinelli 87' (4:0)	Summary	88' (4:1) Hügi (II)	Attendance: 6,000; Referee: (Switzerland) Strässle Steinach

29 April 1962 Round 25	Basel	6–2	Young Boys	Landhof, Basel
15:00	Weber 27' (1:0); Stocker 32' (2:0); Pfirter 49' (3:1); Burri 69' (4:1); Pfirter 75' (5:2); Weber 87' (6:2)	Summary	39' (2:1) Schultheiss; 71' (4:2) Wechselberger	Attendance: 7,500; Referee: (Switzerland) Albert Weber Lausanne

5 May 1962 Round 26	La Chaux-de-Fonds	3–0	Basel	Stade Charrière, La Chaux-de-Fonds
20:00	Bertschi 8' (1:0); Antenen 75' (2:0); Wenger 89' (3:0)	Summary		Attendance: 3,500; Referee: (Switzerland) Helbling Uznach

==== League table ====
Pos	Team	Pld	W	D	L	GF	GA	GD	Pts	Qualification
1	Servette	26	18	4	4	93	30	+63	40	Swiss Champions, qualified for 1962–63 European Cup and entered 1962–63 Intertoto Cup
2	Lausanne-Sport	26	15	5	6	63	38	+25	35	Swiss Cup winners, qualified for 1962–63 Cup Winners' Cup
3	La Chaux-de-Fonds	26	16	2	8	72	45	+27	34	Entered 1962–63 Intertoto Cup
4	Grasshopper Club	26	12	7	7	61	52	+9	31	
5	Young Boys	26	13	3	10	61	51	+10	29	Entered 1962–63 Intertoto Cup
6	Luzern	26	11	6	9	45	38	+7	28	
7	Basel	26	10	8	8	51	54	−3	28	Entered 1962–63 Intertoto Cup
8	Biel-Bienne	26	7	10	9	45	49	−4	24	
9	Zürich	26	8	6	12	53	57	−4	22	
10	Lugano	26	6	10	10	32	60	−28	22	
11	Grenchen	26	7	7	12	39	59	−20	21	
12	Young Fellows Zürich	26	7	6	13	53	63	−10	20	
13	Schaffhausen	26	6	7	13	40	65	−25	19	Relegated
14	Fribourg	26	2	7	17	33	80	−47	11	Relegated

Source: rsssf.com

=== Swiss Cup ===
22 October 1961 3rd principal round	Basel	3–2 (a.e.t.)	SR Delémont	Landhof, Basel
14:30	Hügi (II) 47' (1:2); Von Krannichfeldt 62' (2:2); Blumer 101' (3:2)	Summary	13' (0:1) Gassmann; 27' (o.g. 0:2) Weber	Attendance: 2,800; Referee: (Switzerland) Anton Bucheli Luzern

19 November 1961 Round 4	Basel	3–0	FC Breite	Landhof, Basel
14:30	Hügi (II) 55' (1:0); Pfirter 78' (2:0); Hügi (II) 80' (3:0)	Summary		Attendance: 3,000; Referee: (Switzerland) A. Ceretti Biel/Bienne

14 January 1962 Round 5	Zürich	0–1	Basel	Letzigrund, Zürich
		Summary	88' (o.g.)	Attendance: 5,000; Referee: (Switzerland) Othmar Huber Thun

18 February 1962 Quarter-final	Bellinzona	1–0	Basel	Stadio Comunale, Bellinzona
	Buzzin 75' (1:0)	Summary		Attendance: 1,000; Referee: (Switzerland) F. Schorer Interlaken

=== International Football Cup ===
==== Group B4 matches ====
17 June 1961 Round 1	Basel (Switzerland)	0–4	(Netherlands) Sparta Rotterdam	Landhof, Basel
18:00		Summary	(2x) van Miert (1x) de Vries (1x)} Janssen	Attendance: 3,500; Referee: (Austria) Carl Erich Steiner Wien

25 June 1961 Round 2	Elfsborg (Sweden)	2–1	(Switzerland) Basel	Ryavallen, Borås, Sweden
	Raaberg (1x); Larsson (1x)	Summary	(1x) Hügi (II)	Attendance: 3,300; Referee: (Germany) Johannes Malka Herten

2 July 1961 Round 3	Tasmania Berlin (West Germany)	1–2	(Switzerland) Basel	Poststadion, Berlin
	Rosenfeldt 7' (1:0)	Summary	35' (1:1) Hügi (II); 46' (1:2) Stocker	Attendance: 2,500; Referee: (Sweden) Johanesson

8 July 1961 Round 4	Basel (Switzerland)	1–1	(West Germany) Tasmania Berlin	Landhof, Basel
18:30	Speidel (1x)	Summary	(1x o.g.)	Attendance: 3,000; Referee: (Austria) Friedrich Seipelt

15 July 1961 Round 5	Basel (Switzerland)	3–6	(Sweden) Elfsborg	Landhof, Basel
18:30	Hügi (II) (1x); Von Krannichfeldt (1x); Walther (1x)	Summary	(3x) Larsson (2x) Raberg (1x) Bartholdsson	Attendance: 2,800; Referee: (Austria) Friedrich Mayer

23 July 1961 Round 6	Sparta Rotterdam (Netherlands)	5–2	(Switzerland) Basel	Rotterdam
	Van Buuren 3' (1:1); De Vries 19' (2:1); Verhoeven 49' (3:2); Bosselaar 58' (4:2); Jansen 76' (5:2)	Summary	2' (0:1) Hügi (II); 31' (2:2) Burri	Attendance: 12,000; Referee: (Sweden) Gösta Ackerborn

==== Group table ====
Pos	Team	Pld	W	D	L	GF	GA	GD	Pts	SPA	ELF	TAS	BAS
1	(Netherlands) Sparta Rotterdam (A)	6	5	0	1	23	12	+11	10	—	4–3	4–1	5–2
2	(Sweden) Elfsborg	6	4	0	2	21	17	+4	8	2–5	—	5–2	2–1
3	(West Germany) Tasmania Berlin	6	1	1	4	11	16	−5	3	4–1	2–3	—	1–2
4	(Switzerland) Basel	6	1	1	4	9	19	−10	3	0–4	3–6	1–1	—

Source: mogiel.net
Rules for classification: 1) Points; 2) Goal difference; 3) Goals scored; 4) Head-to-head points; 5) Draw.
(A) Advance to a further round

== See also ==
- History of FC Basel
- List of FC Basel players
- List of FC Basel seasons

== Sources ==
- Die ersten 125 Jahre. Publisher: Josef Zindel im Friedrich Reinhardt Verlag, Basel. ISBN 978-3-7245-2305-5
- The FCB team 1961–62 at fcb-archiv.ch
- Switzerland 1961–62 by Erik Garin at Rec.Sport.Soccer Statistics Foundation
