= 1960–61 FC Basel season =

FC Basel
1960–61 season
- Chairman: Ernst Weber
- Manager: Jenő Vincze
- Ground: Landhof, Basel
- Nationalliga A: 5th
- Swiss Cup: 3rd principal round
- Top goalscorer: League: Josef Hügi (17); All: Josef Hügi (17)
- Highest home attendance: 12,000 on 17 September 1960 vs Young Boys
- Lowest home attendance: 2,800 on 23 April 1961 vs Fribourg
- Average home league attendance: 6,223

The 1960–61 season was Fussball Club Basel 1893's 67th season in their existence. It was their 15th consecutive season in the top flight of Swiss football since their promotion from the Nationalliga B the season 1945–46. They played their home games in the Landhof, in the Wettstein Quarter in Kleinbasel. Ernst Weber was the club's chairman for his second consecutive season.

== Overview ==
Jenő Vincze was Basel's team manager for the second season. The West German ex-international footballer Gerhard Siedl joined the team from Bayern Munich during the summer off-season, but he was to leave the club again during the winter break. Hanspeter Stocker joined the team, coming from third tier local club Concordia Basel. Two further new players were Antonio Danani coming from FC Moutier and Fernando Von Krannichfeldt who signed in from FC Mendrisiostar. In the other direction midfielder Jean-Jacques Maurer moved to Servette, allrounder Otto Ludwig moved to third tier local club Old Boys, and forward Roberto "Mucho" Frigerio moved on to score his goals for La Chaux-de-Fonds. Another player who left the squad was defender Werner Bopp who moved on to Nordstern Basel and retired. Bopp had played 16 seasons for Basel, playing in 321 league and 43 cup matches scoring 15 goals during these appearances.

Basel played a total of 43 games this season. Of these 43 matches 26 were in the domestic league, one was in the Swiss Cup and 16 were friendly matches. Of these test matches five were played as hosts and 11 were played away, 12 were won, two were drawn and two ended with a defeat. The team scored 55 goals and conceded 29. The two defeats were suffered at the Landhof against VfR Mannheim and in the St. Jakob Stadium against Santos. The match against Santos was one of the highlights of these test games despite the 2–8 defeat. Gottlieb Stäuble and Josef Hügi scored the goals for Basel. Coutinho scored five and Pelé scored three for Santos. 14,000 spectators paid for a ticket to see the game, much needed money in the bad financial situation that the club was suffering.

Fourteen teams contested the 1960–61 Nationalliga A, these were the top 12 teams from the previous season and the two newly promoted teams Young Fellows Zürich and Fribourg. The Championship was played in a double round-robin, the champions were to be qualified for 1961–62 European Cup and the last two teams in the table were to be relegated. Despite a home defeat against Young Fellows in the very first match, Basel started the season well, winning six of their first eight matches. But then came a run with six consecutive defeats in which the team failed to score a single goal. Basel slipped from the table top down to the relegation zone before they managed to return to winning games. Basel ended the season in 5th position with 28 points, but were 18 points behind the new Swiss Champions Servette. Basel were appointed as one of four Swiss representatives in the newly founded International Football Cup, which was to take place in the summer break after the end of this season. The other three teams who competed in the 1961–62 International Football Cup were La Chaux-de-Fonds, Grenchen and Zürich.

Basel entered the Swiss Cup in the third principal round. They were drawn away against third tier local club Concordia Basel and for Basel the game ended in a fiasco. Despite an early 1–0 lead and in total 18–0 corners, Werner Decker and Heinz Wirz each scored for the under dogs who had a very young Karl Odermatt in their team. Basel lost 2–1 and were eliminated form the competition. Odermatt's football skills were noted, later he and Decker would later transfer to Basel.

== Players ==
The following is the list of the Basel first team squad during the season 1960–61. The list includes players that were in the squad on the day that the Nationalliga A season started on 28 August 1960 but subsequently left the club after that date.

Note: Flags indicate national team as defined under FIFA eligibility rules; some limited exceptions apply. Players may hold more than one non-FIFA nationality.

No.	Pos.	Nation	Player
1	GK	SUI	René Jeker
1	GK	SUI	Kurt Stettler
2	DF	SUI	Bruno Michaud
—	DF	SUI	Hanspeter Stocker (from Concordia Basel)
—	DF	SUI	Ulrich Vetsch
—	DF	SUI	Edmund Vogt
3	DF	SUI	Hans Weber
—	MF	SUI	Peter Brendle
—	MF	SUI	Jean-Louis Gygax
—	MF	SUI	René Jaeck
—	MF	SUI	Rudolf Rickenbacher
—	MF	GER	Gerhard Siedl (from Bayern Munich)

No.	Pos.	Nation	Player
—	MF	SUI	Silvan Thüler
—	MF	SUI	Jean-Claude Bourgnon
8	FW	SUI	Bernhard Chenaux
—	MF	SUI	Antonio Danani (from FC Moutier)
9	FW	SUI	Josef Hügi (II)
—	FW	SUI	Hansueli Oberer
—	MF	SUI	Carlo Porlezza
11	FW	SUI	Paul Speidel
—	FW	HUN	Ferenc Stockbauer
—	MF	SUI	Claus-Dieter Tabel
—	MF	SUI	Fernando Von Krannichfeldt (from FC Mendrisio)
—	MF	SUI	Wolfgang Walther

Players who left the squad

Note: Flags indicate national team as defined under FIFA eligibility rules; some limited exceptions apply. Players may hold more than one non-FIFA nationality.

No.	Pos.	Nation	Player
4	MF	SUI	Jean-Jacques Maurer (to Servette)
6	MF	SUI	René Thüler
7	FW	GER	Otto Ludwig (to Old Boys)

No.	Pos.	Nation	Player
10	FW	SUI	Roberto Frigerio (to La Chaux-de-Fonds)
—	DF	SUI	Werner Bopp (retired)
—	FW	SUI	Ludwig Schraut

== Results ==
Legend

Win Draw Loss Postponed

=== Friendly matches ===
==== Preseason ====
23 July 1960 Pre-season	SC Kleinhüningen (Switzerland)	2–4	(Switzerland) Basel	Schorenmatte, Basel
17:30	Ellen (1:3); Saluz (2:3)	Summary	52' (0:1) Gygax; 60' (0:2) Siedl; 65' (0:3) Tabel; 82' (2:4) Speidel	Attendance: 700; Referee: (Switzerland) Wyttenbach Birsfelden

31 July 1960 Pre-season	Zürich (Switzerland)	3–4	(Switzerland) Basel	Moos, Affoltern am Albis
	Fäh (II) 20' (1:1); Feller (2:2); Waldner (3:3)	Summary	1' (0:1) Hügi (II); 21' (1:2) Siedl; 62' (2:3) Stocker (3:4) Hügi (II)	Attendance: 500; Referee: (Switzerland) Paul Wyssling Zürich

4 August 1960 Pre-season	Black Stars (Switzerland)	0–8	(Switzerland) Basel	Buschwilerhof, Basel
18:30		Summary	Goal	Attendance: 500; Referee: (Switzerland) Gottfried Dienst Basel

7 August 1960 Pre-season	FC Moutier (Switzerland)	1–3	(Switzerland) Basel	Stade de Chalière, Moutier
	Schnegg 60' (1:0)	Summary	(1:1) Michaud (1:2) Siedl (1:3) Chenaux	Attendance: 1,000; Referee: (Switzerland) Guinnard Gletterens

10 August 1960 Pre-season	Basel (Switzerland)	0–1	(Germany) VfR Mannheim	Landhof, Basel
18:15		Summary	31' (0:1) Bast	Attendance: 3,500; Referee: (Switzerland) D. Mellet Lausanne

14 August 1960 Pre-season	Brühl St. Gallen (Switzerland)	1–5	(Switzerland) Basel	Paul-Grüninger-Stadion, St. Gallen
16:30	Bruckl 19' (1:0)	Summary	20' (1:1) Hügi (II); 30' (1:2) Hügi (II); 72' (1:3) Hügi (II); 88' (1:4) Siedl; 89' (1:5) Hügi (II)	Attendance: 3,000; Referee: (Switzerland) Josef Gulde St. Gallen

13 November 1960 Mid-season	Nordstern Basel (Switzerland)	2–4	(Switzerland) Basel	Basel
	Goal	Summary	Goal

==== Winter break and mid-season ====
22 January 1961 Winter break	FC Kickers Luzern (Switzerland)	1–2	(Switzerland) Basel	Luzern
	Goal	Summary	Goal

12 February 1961 Winter break	Basel (Switzerland)	2–2	(Switzerland) Grasshopper Club	Landhof, Basel
15:00	Walther; Brendle	Summary	Dimmeler; Vonlanthen	Attendance: 1,500; Referee: (Switzerland) E. Emmenegger Basel

18 February 1961 Winter break	Basel (Switzerland)	2–1	(Switzerland) Concordia Basel	Landhof, Basel
	Goal	Summary	Goal

26 February 1961 Winter break	Nordstern Basel (Switzerland)	2–5	(Switzerland) Basel	Stadion Rankhof, Basel
15:00	Fischer (2x)	Summary	(2x) Weber (2x) Stockbauer (1x) Hügi (II)	Attendance: 2,500; Referee: (Switzerland) Seiler Basel

3 April 1961 Mid-season	FC Moutier (Switzerland)	2–4	(Switzerland) Basel	Stade de Chalière, Moutier
	(1:3) (2:3)	Summary	20' (0:1) Hügi (II) (0:2) Walther (0:3) Hügi (II) (2:4) Hügi (II)	Attendance: 1,000; Referee: (Switzerland) Meister Neuchâtel

10 May 1961 Mid-season	Basel (Switzerland)	0–0	(Brazil) Canto do Rio	Landhof, Basel
17:30		Summary		Attendance: 6,000; Referee: (Switzerland) Othmar Huber Thun

24 May 1961 Mid-season	Nordstern Basel (Switzerland)	3–5	(Switzerland) Basel	Stadion Rankhof, Basel
	Goal	Summary	Goal	Attendance: 2,500; Referee: (Switzerland) Seiler Basel

27 May 1961 Mid-season	Black Stars (Switzerland)	0–5	(Switzerland) Basel	Buschwilerhof, Basel
		Summary	Goal

1 June 1961 Mid-season	Basel (Switzerland)	2–8	(Brazil) Santos	St. Jakob Stadium, Basel
20:00	Stäuble 48' (1:3); Hügi (II) 55' (2:3)	Summary	4' (0:1) Coutinho; 27' (0:2) Coutinho; 36' (0:3) Coutinho; 62' (2:4) Coutinho; 70' (2:5) Pelé; 72' (2:6) Coutinho; 83' (2:7) Pelé; 89' (2:8) Pelé	Attendance: 14,000; Referee: (Switzerland) Helbling Uznach
Note: Guest players by Basel: Anton Allemann (YB), Frigerio (CdF), Stäuble (Biel)

=== Nationalliga A ===
==== League matches ====
21 August 1960 Round 1	Basel	1–5	Young Fellows Zürich	Landhof, Basel
16:00	Hügi (II) 65' (1:5)	Summary	3' (0:1) Zimmermann; 21' (0:2) Schüpach; 37' (0:3) Worni; 47' (0:4) Zimmermann; 54' (0:5) Zimmermann	Attendance: 5,800; Referee: (Switzerland) Othmar Huber Thun

28 August 1960 Round 2	Luzern	0–1	Basel	Stadion Allmend, Luzern
		Summary	33' (0:1) Walther	Attendance: 6,500; Referee: (Switzerland) Meister Neuchâtel

4 September 1960 Round 3	Basel	3–1	Chiasso	Landhof, Basel
15:00	Michaud 3' (pen. 1:0); Hügi (II) 11' (2:0); Hügi (II) 31' (3:0)	Summary	71' (pen. 3:1) Lettl	Attendance: 3,000; Referee: (Switzerland) W. Müller Baden

11 September 1960 Round 4	Grenchen	1–2	Basel	Stadion Brühl, Grenchen
	Hamel 42' (1:0)	Summary	92' (1:1) Hügi (II); 73' (1:2) Hügi (II)	Attendance: 3,500; Referee: (Switzerland) Guinnard Gletterens

17 September 1960 Round 5	Basel	2–0	Young Boys	Landhof, Basel
16:15	Hügi (II) 48' (1:0); Michaud 55' (pen. 2:0)	Summary		Attendance: 12,000; Referee: (Switzerland) Josef Gulde St. Gallen

25 September 1960 Round 6	Lausanne-Sport	3–1	Basel	Olympique de la Pontaise, Lausanne
15:30	Fauqeux 26' (1:0); Stutz 73' (2:0); Cuche 81' (3:0)	Summary	90' (3:1) Hügi (II)	Attendance: 4,500; Referee: (Switzerland) Helbling Uznach

2 October 1960 Round 7	Basel	2–0	Grasshopper Club	St. Jakob Stadium, Basel
15:30	Oberer 60' (1:0); Hügi (II) 72' (2:0)	Summary		Attendance: 9,500; Referee: (Switzerland) D. Mellet Lausanne

9 October 1960 Round 8	La Chaux-de-Fonds	2–3	Basel	Stade Charrière, La Chaux-de-Fonds
15:00	Bertschi 7' (1:0); Sommerlatt 87' (2:3)	Summary	18' (1:1) Hügi (II); 64' (1:2) Walther; 75' (1:3) Hügi (II)	Attendance: 3,500; Referee: (Switzerland) Victor Werner Schicker Bern

23 October 1960 Round 9	Basel	1–4	Winterthur	Landhof, Basel
15:00	Danani 73' (1:3)	Summary	14' (0:1) Schmid; 52' (0:2) Etterlin; 67' (0:3) Etterlin; 86' (1:4) Schmid	Attendance: 4,800; Referee: (Switzerland) Othmar Huber Thun

30 October 1960 Round 10	Basel	4–0	Biel-Bienne	Landhof, Basel
15:00	Hügi (II) 26' (1:0); Hügi (II) 71' (2:0); Hügi (II) 80' (3:0); Siedl 83' (4:0)	Summary		Attendance: 5,500; Referee: (Switzerland) Zürrer Feldmeilen

6 November 1960 Round 11	Fribourg	1–0	Basel	Stade Universitaire Saint-Léonard, Freiburg
	Vonlanden 37' (1:0)	Summary		Attendance: 3,000; Referee: (Switzerland) Burkhardt St. Gallen

27 November 1960 Round 12	Basel	0–1	Servette	Landhof, Basel
14:30		Summary	26' (0:1) Bosson	Attendance: 11,000; Referee: (Switzerland) D. Mellet Lausanne

4 December 1960 Round 13	Zürich	2–0	Basel	Letzigrund, Zürich
	Brizzi 55' (1:0); Brizzi 58' (2:0)	Summary	(red card) 61' Speidel	Attendance: 12,500; Referee: (Switzerland) Meister Neuchâtel

11 December 1960 Round 14	Young Fellows Zürich	1–0	Basel	Letzigrund, Zürich
12:45	Schennach 8' (1:0)	Summary		Attendance: 5,000; Referee: (Switzerland) Burkhardt St. Gallen

5 March 1961 Round 15	Basel	0–1	Luzern	Landhof, Basel
15:00		Summary	Wüst 22' (0:1)	Attendance: 5,200; Referee: (Switzerland) D. Mellet Lausanne

12 March 1961 Round 16	Chiasso	1–0	Basel	Wankdorf Stadium, Bern
	Chiesa 27' (1:0)	Summary		Attendance: 6,000; Referee: (Switzerland) F. Schorer Interlaken

19 March 1961 Round 17	Basel	1–1	Grenchen	Landhof, Basel
15:00	Mumenthaler 60' (o.g. 1:0)	Summary	88' (o.g. 1:1) Michaud	Attendance: 4,500; Referee: (Switzerland) Victor Werner Schicker Bern

26 March 1961 Round 18	Young Boys	0–0	Basel	Wankdorf Stadium, Bern
		Summary		Attendance: 13,000; Referee: (Switzerland) D. Mellet Lausanne

9 April 1961 Round 19	Basel	2–0	Lausanne-Sport	Landhof, Basel
15:00	Hügi (II) 40' (1:0); Hügi (II) 85' (pen. 2:0)	Summary		Attendance: 5,800; Referee: (Switzerland) Othmar Huber Thun

16 April 1961 Round 20	Grasshopper Club	2–4	Basel	Hardturm, Zürich
	Robbiani 49' (1:2); Robbiani 60' (2:2)	Summary	11' (0:1) Von Krannichfeldt; 43' (0:2) Walther; 60' (2:3) Von Krannichfeldt; 75' (2:4) Speidel	Attendance: 4,200; Referee: (Switzerland) Anton Bucheli Luzern

23 April 1961 Round 21	Basel	3–0	Fribourg	Landhof, Basel
15:30	Thüler 36' (1:0); Michaud 42' (2:0); Oberer 76' (3:0)	Summary		Attendance: 2,800; Referee: (Switzerland) Helbling Uznach

30 April 1961 Round 22	Basel	3–2	La Chaux-de-Fonds	Landhof, Basel
16:00	Michaud 47' (pen. 1:2); Walther 67' (2:2); Hügi (II) 76' (3:2)	Summary	7' (0:1) Frigerio; 40' (0:2) Frigerio	Attendance: 7,000; Referee: (Switzerland) Guinnard Gletterens
Note: Josef Hügi 300th game for Basel (234th goal)

7 May 1961 Round 23	Winterthur	0–4	Basel	Schützenwiese, Winterthur
		Summary	6' (0:1) Walther; 23' (0:2) Oberer; 38' (0:3) Weber; 84' (0:4) Speidel	Attendance: 4,600; Referee: (Switzerland) Josef Gulde St. Gallen

14 May 1961 Round 24	Biel-Bienne	0–1	Basel	Gurzelen Stadion, Biel/Bienne
		Summary	32' (0:1) Hügi (II)	Attendance: 4,500; Referee: (Switzerland) Roland David Lausanne

4 June 1961 Round 25	Servette	4–2	Basel	Charmilles Stadium, Geneva
	Bosson 55' (1:1); Makay 61' (2:1); Heuri 63' (3:1); Makay 67' (4:1)	Summary	15' (pen. 0:1) Michaud; 77' (4:2) Von Krannichfeldt	Attendance: 4,000; Referee: (Switzerland) Othmar Huber ThunL

10 June 1961 Round 26	Basel	2–4	Zürich	Landhof, Basel
18:00	Von Krannichfeldt 76' (1:1); Von Krannichfeldt 79' (2:4)	Summary	27' (0:1) Kellas; 51' (0:2) Waldner; 68' (0:2) Fäh (II); 70' (0:4) Feller	Attendance: 4,000; Referee: (Switzerland) Anton Bucheli Luzern

==== League table ====
Pos	Team	Pld	W	D	L	GF	GA	GD	Pts	Qualification
1	Servette	26	23	0	3	77	29	+48	46	Swiss Champions, qualified for 1961–62 European Cup
2	Young Boys	26	15	6	5	70	37	+33	36	
3	Zürich	26	15	5	6	74	43	+31	35	Entered 1961–62 International Football Cup
4	Grenchen	26	12	6	8	68	49	+19	30	Entered 1961–62 International Football Cup
5	Basel	26	13	2	11	42	36	+6	28	Entered 1961–62 International Football Cup
6	Grasshopper Club	26	10	6	10	60	53	+7	26	
7	La Chaux-de-Fonds	26	11	4	11	65	64	+1	26	Swiss Cup winners, qualified for 1961–62 Cup Winners' Cup and entered 1961–62 International Football Cup
8	Luzern	26	9	6	11	37	45	−8	24	
9	Lausanne-Sport	26	9	5	12	57	58	−1	23	
10	Biel-Bienne	26	8	7	11	43	47	−4	23	
11	Young Fellows Zürich	26	8	6	12	48	63	−15	22	
12	Fribourg	26	7	6	13	30	55	−25	20	
13	Winterthur	26	8	1	17	33	66	−33	17	Relegated
14	Chiasso	26	2	4	20	22	81	−59	8	Relegated

Source: rsssf.com

=== Swiss Cup ===
16 October 1960 3rd principal round	Concordia Basel	2–1	Basel	St. Jakob Stadium, Basel
15:00	Decker 37' (1:1); Wirz 69' (2:1)	Summary	11' (o.g. 0:1) Foglia	Attendance: 1,000; Referee: (Switzerland) Roland David Lausanne
Note: corners 0:18

== See also ==
- History of FC Basel
- List of FC Basel players
- List of FC Basel seasons

== Sources ==
- Die ersten 125 Jahre. Publisher: Josef Zindel im Friedrich Reinhardt Verlag, Basel. ISBN 978-3-7245-2305-5
- The FCB team 1960–61 at fcb-archiv.ch
- Switzerland 1960–61 by Erik Garin at Rec.Sport.Soccer Statistics Foundation
