= 1961–62 International Football Cup =

Tournament details
- Teams: 32

Final positions
- Champions: (Netherlands) Ajax (1st title)
- Runners-up: (Netherlands) Feyenoord

The 1961–62 International Football Cup was the first Intertoto Cup, a football tournament for European clubs that would otherwise not have a European competition to compete in. The inaugural tournament was won by Ajax, who defeated Feyenoord in the final. The competition was contested by 32 clubs, almost exclusively from central Europe – Austria, Czechoslovakia, East Germany, the Netherlands, Switzerland and Sweden entered four clubs each; Poland entered two; and West Germany entered six clubs. Eventually the final became a clash between Dutch rivals Ajax and Feyenoord.

== Teams location ==
Location of teams of the 1961–62 International Football Cup group stage.
Brown: Group A1; Red: Group A2; Orange: Group A3; Yellow: Group A4;
Green: Group B1; Blue: Group B2; Purple: Group B3; Pink: Group B4.

== Group stage ==
The teams were divided into eight groups of four clubs each. The groups were themselves divided geographically as 'A' for eastern countries (Austria, Czechoslovakia, East Germany, and Poland) and 'B' for western countries (the Netherlands, Sweden and Switzerland). Teams from West Germany were placed in both sections. The eight group winners (in bold in the tables below) advanced to the knock-out rounds, with the four 'A' winners being drawn against the four 'B' winners.

=== Group A1 ===
Pos	Team	Pld	W	D	L	GF	GA	GD	Pts	Qualification	SLO	VOR	ODR	WAC
1	(Czechoslovakia) Slovan ÚNV Bratislava	6	4	2	0	16	4	+12	**10**	Advanced to quarter-finals	—	2–1	8–1	3–0
2	(East Germany) Vorwärts Berlin	6	2	1	3	13	10	+3	**5**		0–1	—	2–1	6–1
3	(Poland) Odra Opole	6	2	1	3	8	16	−8	**5**		1–1	2–1	—	2–0
4	(Austria) Wiener AC	6	1	2	3	9	16	−7	**4**		1–1	3–3	4–1	—

Source: mogiel.net

=== Group A2 ===
Pos	Team	Pld	W	D	L	GF	GA	GD	Pts	Qualification
1	(Czechoslovakia) Baník Ostrava	6	5	1	0	24	7	+17	**11**	Advanced to quarter-finals
2	(East Germany) Motor Jena	6	3	2	1	14	12	+2	**8**	
3	(West Germany) Osnabrück	6	2	0	4	9	14	−5	**4**	
4	(Austria) GAK	6	0	1	5	9	23	−14	**1**	

Source: mogiel.net

=== Group A3 ===
Pos	Team	Pld	W	D	L	GF	GA	GD	Pts	Qualification
1	(Czechoslovakia) Spartak Hradec Králové	6	3	2	1	15	12	+3	**8**	Advanced to quarter-finals
2	(Poland) Górnik Zabrze	6	3	1	2	17	14	+3	**7**	
3	(East Germany) Dynamo Berlin	6	3	1	2	13	14	−1	**7**	
4	(Austria) Wiener Sport-Club	6	1	0	5	15	20	−5	**2**	

Source: mogiel.net

=== Group A4 ===
Pos	Team	Pld	W	D	L	GF	GA	GD	Pts	Qualification
1	(Austria) First Vienna	6	4	1	1	17	9	+8	**9**	Advanced to quarter-finals
2	(Czechoslovakia) Tatran Prešov	6	2	2	2	15	14	+1	**6**	
3	(East Germany) Lokomotive Leipzig	6	3	0	3	7	11	−4	**6**	
4	(West Germany) Kickers Offenbach	6	1	1	4	13	18	−5	**3**	

Source: mogiel.net

=== Group B1 ===
Pos	Team	Pld	W	D	L	GF	GA	GD	Pts	Qualification	FEY	S04	GÖT	CDF
1	(Netherlands) Feyenoord	6	5	0	1	24	12	+12	**10**	Advanced to quarter-finals	—	1–3	4–1	3–2
2	(West Germany) Schalke 04	6	4	0	2	22	12	+10	**8**		1–5	—	4–1	8–0
3	(Sweden) IFK Göteborg	6	1	1	4	12	22	−10	**3**		3–6	2–4	—	3–2
4	(Switzerland) La Chaux-de-Fonds	6	1	1	4	11	23	−12	**3**		2–5	3–2	2–2	—

Source: mogiel.net
Rules for classification: 1) Points; 2) Goal difference; 3) Goals scored; 4) Head-to-head points; 5) Draw.

=== Group B2 ===
Pos	Team	Pld	W	D	L	GF	GA	GD	Pts	Qualification	AJA	MAL	PIR	ZÜR
1	(Netherlands) Ajax	6	4	1	1	26	8	+18	**9**	Advanced to quarter-finals	—	1–0	9–1	9–1
2	(Sweden) Malmö FF	6	3	2	1	15	10	+5	**8**		1–1	—	4–2	4–1
3	(West Germany) Pirmasens	6	3	1	2	17	19	−2	**7**		4–2	3–3	—	5–0
4	(Switzerland) Zürich	6	0	0	6	6	27	−21	**0**		1–4	2–3	1–2	—

Source: mogiel.net
Rules for classification: 1) Points; 2) Goal difference; 3) Goals scored; 4) Head-to-head points; 5) Draw.

18 June 1961
Round 1

Zürich (Switzerland)	2–3	(Sweden) Malmö FF
Waldner 9' (1:0); Feller 79' (2:3)	FCZ summary	25' (1:1) Wendt; 58' (1:2) Holmqvist; 67' (1:3) Wendt

Letzigrund, Zürich
Attendance: 3,000
Referee: (Austria) Fritz Seipelt

25 June 1961
Round 2

Zürich (Switzerland)	1–2	(Germany) Pirmasens
Fäh (1:0)	FCZ summary	(1:1) Weishaar; 21' (1:2) Matischak

Hardturm, Zürich
Attendance: 6,500
Referee: (Netherlands) H. Martens

2 July 1961
Round 3

Ajax (Netherlands)	9–1	(Switzerland) Zürich
Groot 2' (1:0); Keizer 15' (2:0); Groot 20' (3:0); Keizer 50' (4:0); Keizer 55' (5:0); Feldmann 62' (6:0); Swart 75' (7:0); Groot 82' (8:0); Groot 85' (9:0)	FCZ summary	90' (9:1) Kuhn

Olympisch Stadion, Amsterdam
Attendance: 6,500
Referee: (Sweden) Einar Boström

8 July 1961
Round 4

Zürich (Switzerland)	1–4	(Netherlands) Ajax
Waldner 44' (1:1)	FCZ summary	Petersen 34' (0:1); Petersen 65' (1:2); Groot 69' (1:3); Groot 85' (1:4)

Hardturm, Zürich
Attendance: 1,200
Referee: (Germany) Albert Dusch

16 July 1961
Round 5

Pirmasens (Germany)	5–0	(Switzerland) Zürich
Hohmann 5' (1:0); Kapitulski 25' (2:0); Fritzsche (3:0); Kapitulski 67' (4:0); Kapitulski 87' (5:0)	FCZ summary

Stadion an der Zweibrücker Strasse, Pirmasens
Attendance: 4,000
Referee: (Netherlands) La Croix

23 July 1961
Round 6

Malmö FF (Sweden)	4–1	(Switzerland) Zürich
Gustafsson 44' (1:1); Gustafsson 47' (2:1); Granström 60' (3:1); Gustafsson 77' (4:1)	FCZ summary	18' (0:1) Zsámboki

Malmö Stadion, Malmö
Attendance: 3,700
Referee: (Netherlands) Bogert

=== Group B3 ===
Pos	Team	Pld	W	D	L	GF	GA	GD	Pts	Qualification	ÖRG	VVV	NEU	GRE
1	(Sweden) Örgryte	6	4	2	0	15	7	+8	**10**	Advanced to quarter-finals	—	2–1	3–1	2–2
2	(Netherlands) VVV-Venlo	6	3	1	2	13	12	+1	**7**		2–2	—	3–2	1–0
3	(West Germany) Borussia Neunkirchen	6	2	0	4	12	15	−3	**4**		1–3	5–3	—	2–0
4	(Switzerland) Grenchen	6	1	1	4	6	12	−6	**3**		0–3	1–3	3–1	—

Source: mogiel.net
Rules for classification: 1) Points; 2) Goal difference; 3) Goals scored; 4) Head-to-head points; 5) Draw.

=== Group B4 ===
Pos	Team	Pld	W	D	L	GF	GA	GD	Pts	Qualification	SPA	ELF	TAS	BAS
1	(Netherlands) Sparta Rotterdam (A)	6	5	0	1	23	12	+11	**10**	Advanced to quarter-finals	—	4–3	4–1	5–2
2	(Sweden) Elfsborg	6	4	0	2	21	17	+4	**8**		2–5	—	5–2	2–1
3	(West Germany) Tasmania Berlin	6	1	1	4	11	16	−5	**3**		4–1	2–3	—	1–2
4	(Switzerland) Basel	6	1	1	4	9	19	−10	**3**		0–4	3–6	1–1	—

Source: mogiel.net
Rules for classification: 1) Points; 2) Goal difference; 3) Goals scored; 4) Head-to-head points; 5) Draw.
(A) Advance to a further round

18 June 1961
18:00
Round 1

FC Basel (Switzerland)	0–4	(Netherlands) Sparta Rotterdam
	Summary	Piet van Miert 40'; Piet de Vries 40'; Tonny van Ede 78'; Tinus Bosselaar 88'

Landhof, Basel
Attendance: 3,500
Referee: (Austria) Erich Steiner (Wien)

25 June 1961
Round 2

Elfsborg (Sweden)	2–1	(Switzerland) Basel
Raaberg (1x); Larsson (1x)	Summary	(1x) Hügi (II)

Ryavallen, Borås, Sweden
Attendance: 3,300
Referee: (Germany) Johannes Malka Herten

25 June 1961
Round 2

Sparta Rotterdam (Netherlands)	4–1	(Germany) SV Tasmania Berlin
Piet van Miert 30'; Henk Janssen 32'; Tonny van Ede 36'; Cees Doesburg 75'

Het Kasteel, Rotterdam
Attendance: 998
Referee: (Sweden) Bertil Lööw

2 July 1961
Round 3

Tasmania Berlin (West Germany)	1–2	(Switzerland) Basel
Rosenfeldt 7' (1:0)	Summary	35' (1:1) Hügi (II); 46' (1:2) Stocker

Poststadion, Berlin
Attendance: 2,500
Referee: (Sweden) Johanesson

2 July 1961
Round 3

Sparta Rotterdam (Netherlands)	4–3	(Sweden) IF Elfsborg
Tinus Bosselaar 16', 65', 89' (pen.); Henk Janssen 58'		Henry Larsson 30'; Leif Pettersson 34'; Wigar Bartholdsson 45'

Het Kasteel, Rotterdam
Attendance: 9,808
Referee: (Germany) Günther Baumgärtl

8 July 1961
18:30
Round 4

Basel (Switzerland)	1–1	(West Germany) Tasmania Berlin
Speidel (1x)	Summary	(1x o.g.)

Landhof, Basel
Attendance: 3,000
Referee: (Austria) Friedrich Seipelt

9 July 1961
Round 4

IF Elfsborg (Sweden)	2–5	(Netherlands) Sparta Rotterdam
Wigar Bartholdsson 55'; Henry Larsson 58'		Henk Janssen 17', 21'; Piet van Miert 30', 38', 51'

Borås Arena, Borås
Attendance: 3,852
Referee: (Germany) Günter Sparing

15 July 1961
18:30
Round 5

Basel (Switzerland)	3–6	(Sweden) Elfsborg
Hügi (II) (1x); Von Krannichfeldt (1x); Walther (1x)	Summary	(3x) Larsson (2x) Raberg (1x) Bartholdsson

Landhof, Basel
Attendance: 2,800
Referee: (Austria) Friedrich Mayer

16 July 1961
Round 5

SV Tasmania Berlin (Germany)	4–1	(Netherlands) Sparta Rotterdam
Peter Engler 3'; Friedrich Schlichting 14', 41'; Wolfgang Neumann 18'		Piet de Vries 28'

Sportpark Neukölln, Neukölln
Attendance: 4,000
Referee: (Sweden) Roland Bäckström

23 July 1961
Round 6

Sparta Rotterdam (Netherlands)	5–2	(Switzerland) FC Basel
Willem van Buuren 3'; Piet de Vries 19'; Ad Verhoeven 49'; Tinus Bosselaar 58'; Henk Janssen 73'	Summary	Josef Hügi 2' (pen.); René Burri 31'

Het Kasteel, Rotterdam
Attendance: 12,000
Referee: (Sweden) Gösta Ackeborn

== Quarter-finals ==
Team 1	Score	Team 2
Slovan Bratislava (Czechoslovakia)	6–1	(Netherlands) Sparta Rotterdam
Ajax (Netherlands)	4–3	(Austria) First Vienna
Örgryte (Sweden)	2–3	(Czechoslovakia) Baník Ostrava
Feyenoord (Netherlands)	3–1	(Czechoslovakia) Spartak Hradec Králové

14 September 1961

Slovan Bratislava (Czechoslovakia)	6–1	(Netherlands) Sparta Rotterdam
Anton Moravčík 19', 75'; Milan Balazik 35', 71'; Pavol Molnár 37'; Ján Popluhár 69'		Joop Daniëls 47'

Tehelné pole, Bratislava
Attendance: 20,000
Referee: (Austria) Eduard Babauczek

27 September 1961

Ajax (Netherlands)	4–3 (a.e.t.)	(Austria) First Vienna
Henk Groot 12', 115'; Piet Keizer 26', 46'		Hans Buzek 43', 62', 81'

Olympic Stadium, Amsterdam
Attendance: 25,000
Referee: (Germany) Gunther Ternieden

25 October 1961

Örgryte (Sweden)	2–3	(Czechoslovakia) Baník Ostrava
Stig Andersson 16'; Rolf Wetterlind 21'		Milan Siry 7'; Miroslav Wiecek 60'; Zdenek Stanczo 80'

Nya Ullevi, Gothenburg
Attendance: 2,144
Referee: (Germany) Werner Bergmann

22 November 1961

Feyenoord (Netherlands)	3–1	(Czechoslovakia) Spartak Hradec Králové
Rinus Bennaars 56'; Reinier Kreijermaat 69', 90'		Rudolf Tauchen 48'

De Kuip, Rotterdam
Attendance: 30,000
Referee: (Germany) Kurt Tschenscher

== Semi-finals ==
Team 1	Score	Team 2
Ajax (Netherlands)	5–1	(Czechoslovakia) Slovan Bratislava
Feyenoord (Netherlands)	1–0	(Czechoslovakia) Baník Ostrava

8 March 1962

Ajax (Netherlands)	5–1	(Czechoslovakia) Slovan Bratislava
Co Prins 45', 71', 82'; Donald Feldmann 72', 88'		Jozef Vengloš 15'

Olympic Stadium, Amsterdam
Attendance: 9,551
Referee: (Germany) Johannes Malka

8 March 1962

Feyenoord (Netherlands)	1–0	(Czechoslovakia) Baník Ostrava
Frans Bouwmeester 89'

De Kuip, Rotterdam
Attendance: 32,575
Referee: (Sweden) Erik Johansson

== Final ==
Played over one leg, in Amsterdam.

Team 1	Score	Team 2
Ajax (Netherlands)	4–2	(Netherlands) Feyenoord

26 April 1962

Ajax (Netherlands)	4–2	(Netherlands) Feyenoord
Cees Groot 10'; Henk Groot 26', 62', 90'		Frans Bouwmeester 11'; Cor van der Gijp 43'

Olympic Stadium, Amsterdam
Attendance: 40,260
Referee: (Netherlands) Joop Martens

== See also ==
- 1961–62 European Cup
- 1961–62 UEFA Cup Winners' Cup
- 1961–62 Inter-Cities Fairs Cup
