= 1959–60 FC Basel season =

FC Basel
1959–60 season
- Chairman: Ernst Weber
- Manager: Jenő Vincze
- Ground: Landhof, Basel
- Nationalliga A: 10th
- Swiss Cup: Round of 16
- Top goalscorer: League: Roberto Frigerio and Josef Hügi (both 15); All: Josef Hügi (19)
- Highest home attendance: 8,000 on 24 April 1960 vs La Chaux-de-Fonds and on 11 June 1960 vs Young Boys
- Lowest home attendance: 3,800 on 8 November 1959 vs Winterthur and on 13 December 1959 vs Lugano
- Average home league attendance: 5,523

The 1959–60 season was Fussball Club Basel 1893's 66th season in their existence. It was their 14th consecutive season in the top flight of Swiss football since their promotion from the Nationalliga B the season 1945–46. They played their home games in the Landhof, in the Wettstein Quarter in Kleinbasel. Ernst Weber was the club's new chairman taking over from Jules Düblin after the AGM on 27 May 1959. Düblin presided the club during the period July 1946 until Mai 1959 and in the club's history he is the most permanent president that the club has had to date.

== Overview ==
Jenő Vincze was hired as new team manager, following René Bader who had been trainer ad-interim. The Hungarian ex-international footballer Vincze had been team manager of Servette the previous two seasons. Defender Ulrich Vetsch joined the club from Young Fellows Zürich, Hungarian striker Ferenc Stockbauer joined from SV Wiesbaden, Paul Speidel from lower-tier club FC Olten and Jean-Louis Gygax from lower tier FC Moutier. In the other direction Hans Hügi moved on to Young Fellows Zürich after 11 seasons and 220 league and cup games for Basel. Hermann Suter, who had played 16 seasons for Basel and in 229 league and cup games had scored 104 goals, ended his active football career. Antoine Kohn moved on to play for Fortuna '54. Fredy Kehrli, Charles Turin and Gottlieb Stäuble returned to or moved on to newly promoted Biel-Bienne.

Basel played a total of 44 games this season. Of these 44 matches 26 were in the domestic league, four were in the Swiss Cup and 14 were friendly matches. Only two of these friendly games were played at home, the rest were played away, including two in the Easter tournament in Bruges against Polonia Bytom and Club Brugge KV. The friendly games resulted with six victories, four draws and four defeats. The team scored 33 goals and conceded 18.

Fourteen teams contested the 1959–60 Nationalliga A, these were the top 12 teams from the previous season and the two newly promoted teams FC Winterthur and FC Biel-Bienne. The Championship was played in a double round-robin and the last two teams in the table to be relegated. Basel started badly into the new season, losing five of the first seven games. In fact, the team won only one of their first 16 games and were always in the lower regions of the league table. However, with five victories in their last ten league matches, the team lifted themselves to tenth position in the table, but were still lower positioned than the afore mentioned two newly promoted teams. In fact, Biel-Bienne managed to end the season in second position behind the reigning and new champions Young Boys who won the championship for the fourth successive season. Two of these last five victories were against Lugano and Bellinzona and these two teams then suffered relegation. Basel's top league goal scorers were Roberto Frigerio and Josef Hügi both of whom managed 15 league goals. Frigerio managed a hat-trick in the away game against Zürich on 20 March 1960.

Basel entered the Swiss Cup in the third principal round. They were drawn away against third tier SC Derendingen and won 1–0 through a goal by their Hungarian striker Ferenc Stockbauer. In the next round Basel were drawn at home at the Landhof against lower-tier team FC Porrentruy and this ended with a 5–2 victory. In the round of 16 Basel played a home 1–1 draw with the Young Boys, but then lost the replay 3–5. Luzern won the competition winning the final against Grenchen.

== Players ==
The following is the list of the Basel first team squad during the season 1959–60. The list includes players that were in the squad on the day that the Nationalliga A season started on 23 August 1959 but subsequently left the club after that date.

Note: Flags indicate national team as defined under FIFA eligibility rules; some limited exceptions apply. Players may hold more than one non-FIFA nationality.

No.	Pos.	Nation	Player
1	GK	SUI	René Jeker
1	GK	SUI	Kurt Stettler
2	DF	SUI	Bruno Michaud
3	DF	SUI	Hans Weber
4	MF	SUI	Jean-Jacques Maurer
5	FW	SUI	Hansueli Oberer
6	MF	SUI	René Thüler
7	FW	GER	Otto Ludwig
8	FW	SUI	Bernhard Chenaux
9	FW	SUI	Josef Hügi (II)

No.	Pos.	Nation	Player
10	FW	SUI	Roberto Frigerio
11	FW	SUI	Paul Speidel (from FC Olten)
—	DF	SUI	Werner Bopp
—	DF	SUI	Ulrich Vetsch (from Young Fellows Zürich)
—	DF	SUI	Jean-Louis Gygax (from FC Moutier)
—	MF	SUI	René Jaeck
—	MF	SUI	Rudolf Rickenbacher
—	MF	SUI	Silvan Thüler
—	FW	SUI	Ludwig Schraut
—	FW	HUN	Ferenc Stockbauer (from SV Wiesbaden)

Players who left the squad

Note: Flags indicate national team as defined under FIFA eligibility rules; some limited exceptions apply. Players may hold more than one non-FIFA nationality.

No.	Pos.	Nation	Player
—	GK	SUI	Walter Wider
—	DF	SUI	Hans Hügi (I) (to Young Fellows Zürich)
—	DF	SUI	Fredy Kehrli (to Biel-Bienne)
—	DF	SUI	Jules Wyss
—	MF	SUI	Charles Turin (to Biel-Bienne)

No.	Pos.	Nation	Player
—	FW	SUI	Rudolf Burger (to Grasshopper Club)
—	MF	SUI	Gottlieb Stäuble (to Biel-Bienne)
—	FW	LUX	Antoine Kohn (to Fortuna '54)
—	FW	SUI	Raymond Simonet (to Cantonal Neuchatel)
—	FW	SUI	Hermann Suter (retired)

== Results ==
Legend

Win Draw Loss Postponed

=== Friendly matches ===
==== Pre- and mid-season ====
1959 Pre-season	Old Boys (Switzerland)	2–2	(Switzerland) Basel	Basel
	Goal	Summary	Goal

1959 Pre-season	Concordia Basel (Switzerland)	1–4	(Switzerland) Basel	Basel
	Goal	Summary	Goal

1959 Pre-season	SC Binningen (Switzerland)	0–2	(Switzerland) Basel	Binningen
		Summary	Goal

2 August 1959 Pre-season	Grenchen (Switzerland)	2–2	(Switzerland) Basel	Stade de Fontenais, Fontenais
	Hamel 21' (1:0); Hamel (2:1)	Summary	23' (1:1) Frigerio (2:2) Ludwig	Attendance: 1,500; Referee: (Switzerland) Surdez Delémont

8 August 1959 Pre-season	SC Kleinhüningen (Switzerland)	1–6	(Switzerland) Basel	Schorenmatte, Basel
18:00	Meier (1:6)	Summary	23' (0:1) Frigerio; 27' (0:2) Frigerio (0:3) Stockbauer (0:4) Schraut (0:5) Speidel (0:6) Speidel	Attendance: 300; Referee: (Switzerland) M. Schreiber Reinach

12 August 1959 Pre-season	Basel (Switzerland)	0–2	(Belgium) Standard Liège	Landhof, Basel
20:00		Summary	71' (0:1) Paeschen; 77' (0:2) Paeschen	Attendance: 4,500; Referee: (Switzerland) Gottfried Dienst Basel

16 August 1959 Pre-season	Aarau (Switzerland)	1–0	(Switzerland) Basel	Stadion Brügglifeld, Aarau
	Crivelli (1:0)	Summary		Attendance: 2,400; Referee: (Switzerland) W. Müller Baden

20 September 1959 Mid-season	FC Emmenbrücke (Switzerland)	1–4	(Switzerland) Basel	Gersag, Emmenbrücke
	De Mauro (pen.)	Summary	(1x) Hügi (II) (1x) Oberer (1x) Chenaux (1x) Stockbauer	Attendance: 500; Referee: (Switzerland) Anton Bucheli Luzern

3 October 1959 Mid-season	Basel (Switzerland)	0–0	(Switzerland) Nordstern Basel	Landhof, Basel
16:00		Summary		Attendance: 1,000; Referee: (Switzerland) E. Emmenegger Basel

25 October 1959 Mid-season	FC Langenthal (Switzerland)	0–5	(Switzerland) Basel	Langenthal
		Summary	Goal	Attendance: 1,500

==== Winter break and mid-season ====
1 February 1960 Winter break	Baden (Switzerland)	2–6	(Switzerland) Basel	Scharten, Baden
	Arnold 3' (1:0); Schweizer 22' (2:2)	Summary	10' (1:1) Frigerio (1:2) Jaeck; 40' (o.g. 2:3); 55' (2:4) Frigerio (o.g. 2:5) (2:6) Jaeck	Attendance: 1,200; Referee: (Switzerland) W. Rufli Bremgarten

17 April 1960 Semi-final	Polonia Bytom (Poland)	1–1 (7–8 p)	(Switzerland) Basel	Bruges
	Pilodwizck 55' (1:0)	Summary	(1:1) Hügi (II)
	Penalties
	Penalty scored Penalty missed		Penalty scored Penalty missed
Note: Easter tournament in Bruges. Decision after penalty shootout: 10 shots per team, Basel score 8 times, Bruges only 7 times.

18 April 1960 Final	Club Brugge KV (Belgium)	2–0	(Switzerland) Basel	Bruges
	Gerard 13' (1:0) van Eeckhout 78' (2:0)	Summary
Note: Easter tournament in Bruges.

17 April 1960 Mid-season	Basel (Switzerland)	1–3	(France) Toulouse FC	St. Jakob Stadium, Basel
20:00	Hügi (II) 10' (1:0)	Summary	15' (1:1) Maouche; 30' (1:2) Dorsini; 75' (1:3) Schultze	Attendance: 1,200; Referee: (Switzerland) Anton Bucheli Luzern

=== Nationalliga A ===
==== League matches ====
23 August 1959 Round 1	Grenchen	3–2	Basel	Stadion Brühl, Grenchen
15:00	Morf 22' (pen. 1:1); Glisovic 29' (2:1); Moser 60' (3:2); Raboud (I) (yellow card)	Summary	3' (pen. 0:1) Michaud; 38' (2:2) Ludwig	Attendance: 3,800; Referee: (Switzerland) Anton Bucheli Luzern

30 August 1959 Round 2	Basel	0–2	Biel-Bienne	Landhof, Basel
15:00		Summary	10' (0:1) Koller; 41' (0:2) Derwall	Attendance: 5,000; Referee: (Switzerland) Guinnard Gletterens

6 September 1959 Round 3	Grasshopper Club	3–0	Basel	Hardturm, Zürich
16:15	Gabrieli 3' (1:0); Hagen 60' (2:0); Ballaman 69' (3:0)	Summary		Attendance: 7,000; Referee: (Switzerland) Meister Neuchâtel

13 September 1959 Round 4	Basel	3–1	Zürich	Landhof, Basel
15:00	Oberer 58' (1:1); Weber 4' (2:1); Hügi (II) 76' (3:1)	Summary	13' (0:1) Reutlinger; (yellow card) Kehl; (yellow card) Stählin	Attendance: 4,900; Referee: (Switzerland) Victor Werner Schicker Bern

27 September 1959 Round 5	Servette	5–2	Basel	Charmilles Stadium, Geneva
	Heuri 30' (1:2); Fatton 36' (2:2); Schneider 45' (pen. 3:2); Fatton 71' (4:2); Fatton 84' (5:2)	Summary	5' (0:2) Hügi (II); 15' (0:2) Stockbauer	Attendance: 5,000; Referee: (Switzerland) Paul Wyssling Zürich

11 October 1959 Round 6	Basel	2–2	Lausanne-Sport	Landhof, Basel
15:00	Weber 34 1:1'; Michaud 69' (2:2)	Summary	32' (0:1) Hosp; 49' (pen. 1:2) Vonlanden	Attendance: 4,500; Referee: (Switzerland) Othmar Huber Thun

18 October 1959 Round 7	La Chaux-de-Fonds	4–1	Basel	Stade Charrière, La Chaux-de-Fonds
15:00	Sommerlatt 25' (pen. 1:0); Morand 70' (2:0); Antenen 75' (3:0); Antenen 79' (4:1)	Summary	77' (3:1) Frigerio	Attendance: 4,000; Referee: (Switzerland) Schüttel Sion

8 November 1959 Round 8	Basel	3–3	Winterthur	Landhof, Basel
14:30	Frigerio 5' (1:0); Frigerio 37' (2:2); Oberer 43' (3:2)	Summary	12' (1:1) Scheller; 30' (1:2) Akeret; 59' (3:3) Etterlin	Attendance: 3,800; Referee: (Switzerland) Anton Bucheli Luzern

15 November 1959 Round 9	Bellinzona	P–P	Basel	Stadio Comunale, Bellinzona
		[ Summary]

22 November 1959 Round 10	Basel	3–3	Luzern	Landhof, Basel
14:30	Hügi (II) 20' (1:0); Frigerio 30' (2:0); Frigerio 77' (3:3)	Summary	37' (2:1) Hahn; 42' (2:2) Hahn; 66' (2:3) Lüscher	Attendance: 5,000; Referee: (Switzerland) Guinnard Gletterens

6 December 1959 Round 11	Chiasso	2–1	Basel	Stadio Via Comacini, Chiasso
	Boldini 21' (1:0); Boffi 52' (2:0)	Summary	54' (2:1) Hügi (II)	Attendance: 2,000; Referee: (Switzerland) Domeniconi Geneva

13 December 1959 Round 12	Basel	1–1	Lugano	Landhof, Basel
14:30	Michaud 71' (1:1)	Summary	15' (0:1) Frosio	Attendance: 3,800; Referee: (Switzerland) Schwab Neuchâtel

20 December 1959 Round 13	Young Boys	1–1	Basel	Wankdorf Stadium, Bern
	Meier 39' (1:0)	Summary	77' (1:1) Frigerio	Attendance: 10,000; Referee: (Switzerland) D. Mellet Lausanne

21 February 1960 Round 9	Bellinzona	0–0	Basel	Stadio Comunale, Bellinzona
		Summary		Attendance: 3,000; Referee: (Switzerland) D. Mellet Lausanne

28 February 1960 Round 14	Basel	1–1	Grenchen	Landhof, Basel
14:30	Hügi (II) 85' (1:1)	Summary	40' (0:1) Löffel	Attendance: 5,000; Referee: (Switzerland) M. Baumberger Lausanne

6 March 1960 Round 15	Biel-Bienne	3–1	Basel	Gurzelen Stadion, Biel/Bienne
	Turin 6' (1:0); Hänzi 59' (2:0); Graf 70' (2:1)	Summary	68' (2:1) Weber	Attendance: 6,000; Referee: (Switzerland) Paul Wyssling Zürich

13 March 1960 Round 16	Basel	1–1	Grasshopper Club	Landhof, Basel
15:00	Michaud 4' (pen. 1:0)	Summary	9' (o.g. 1:1)	Attendance: 7,000; Referee: (Switzerland) F. Schorer Interlaken

20 March 1960 Round 17	Zürich	2–3	Basel	Letzigrund, Zürich
15:00	Pastega 42' (1:2); Wüthrich 50' (2:2)	Summary	14' (0:1) Frigerio; 23' (0:2) Frigerio; 52' (2:3) Frigerio	Attendance: 6,000; Referee: (Switzerland) Victor Werner Schicker Bern

3 April 1960 Round 18	Basel	2–2	Servette	Landhof, Basel
15:00	Hügi (II) 48' (1:1); Hügi (II) 78' (2:2)	Summary	7' (0:1) Pázmándy; 76' (1:2) Pázmándy	Attendance: 5,800; Referee: (Switzerland) Schüttel Sion

10 April 1960 Round 19	Lausanne-Sport	2–1	Basel	Olympique de la Pontaise, Lausanne
20:22	Hertig 1' (1:0); Armbruster 89' (2:1)	Summary	20' (o.g. 1:1) Fesselet	Attendance: 4,500; Referee: (Switzerland) Burkhardt St. Gallen

24 April 1960 Round 20	Basel	4–0	La Chaux-de-Fonds	Landhof, Basel
15:00	Hügi (II) 47' (1:0); Hügi (II) 53' (2:0); Frigerio 55' (3:0); Frigerio 85' (4:0)	Summary		Attendance: 8,000; Referee: (Switzerland) Victor Werner Schicker Bern

1 May 1960 Round 21	Winterthur	2–0	Basel	Schützenwiese, Winterthur
	Schmid 64' (1:0); Gantenbein 82' (2:0)	Summary		Attendance: 6,000; Referee: (Switzerland) W. Müller Baden

15 May 1960 Round 22	Basel	3–1	Bellinzona	Landhof, Basel
15:00	Frigerio 37' (1:0); Frigerio 80' (2:0); Hügi (II) 85' (3:0)	Summary	86' (3:1) Pellanda	Attendance: 4,500; Referee: (Switzerland) Paul Wyssling Zürich

22 May 1960 Round 23	Luzern	6–1	Basel	Stadion Allmend, Luzern
	Wolfisberg 17' (1:0); Blättler 19' (2:0); Hahn 59' (pen. 3:1); Hahn 80' (4:1); Frey 81' (5:1); Beerli 84' (6:1)	Summary	27' (o.g. 2:1) Kunz	Attendance: 5,000; Referee: (Switzerland) Helbling Uznach

29 May 1960 Round 24	Basel	3–0	Chiasso	Landhof, Basel
15:00	Frigerio 48' (1:0); Michaud 83' (2:0); Hügi (II) 85' (3:0)	Summary		Attendance: 6,500; Referee: (Switzerland) Victor Werner Schicker Bern

5 June 1960 Round 25	Lugano	2–4	Basel	Cornaredo, Lugano
	Benko 1' (1:0); Ciani 26' (2:1)	Summary	11' (1:1) Ludwig; 34' (2:2) Jaeck; 73' (2:3) Hügi (II); 78' (2:4) Hügi (II)	Attendance: 2,500; Referee: (Switzerland) Helbling Uznach

11 June 1960 Round 26	Basel	3–3	Young Boys	Landhof, Basel
17:45	Hügi (II) 8' (1:0); Frigerio 25' (2:1); Hügi (II) 40' (3:1)	Summary	9' (1:1) Wechselberger; 69' (2:1) Dürr; 76' (3:3) Wechselberger	Attendance: 8,000; Referee: (Switzerland) Anton Bucheli Luzern

==== League table ====
Pos	Team	Pld	W	D	L	GF	GA	GD	Pts	Qualification
1	Young Boys	26	20	2	4	86	44	+42	42	Swiss Champions, qualified for 1960–61 European Cup
2	Biel-Bienne	26	14	8	4	61	38	+23	36	
3	La Chaux-de-Fonds	26	14	4	8	71	51	+20	32	
4	Zürich	26	13	5	8	64	44	+20	31	
5	Luzern	26	11	5	10	65	62	+3	27	Swiss Cup winners, qualified for 1960–61 Cup Winners' Cup
6	Winterthur	26	12	3	11	40	40	0	27	
7	Servette	26	8	9	9	46	39	+7	25	
8	Grasshopper Club	26	8	8	10	54	61	−7	24	
9	Chiasso	26	8	7	11	39	57	−18	23	
10	Basel	26	6	10	10	46	55	−9	22	
11	Grenchen	26	8	5	13	51	48	+3	21	
12	Lausanne-Sport	26	7	7	12	41	74	−33	21	
13	Lugano	26	6	6	14	34	52	−18	18	Relegated
14	Bellinzona	26	4	7	15	28	61	−33	15	Relegated

Source: rsssf.com

=== Swiss Cup ===
1 November 1959 3rd principal round	SC Derendingen	0–1	Basel	Heidenegg, Derendingen
15:30		Summary	21' (0:1) Stockbauer	Attendance: 1,000; Referee: (Switzerland) Surdez Delémont

29 November 1959 Round 4	Basel	5–2	FC Porrentruy	Landhof, Basel
	Frigerio 1' (1:0); Hügi (II) 44' (2:0); Weber 59' (3:0); Hügi (II) 70' (4:1); Frigerio 86' (5:2)	Summary	69' (3:1) Froidevaux; 82' (4:2) Brunner	Attendance: 1,500; Referee: (Switzerland) Staufer Renens

27 December 1959 Round 5	Basel	1–1 (a.e.t.)	Young Boys	St. Jakob Stadium, Basel
14:30	Hügi (II) 71' (1:1)	Summary	8' (0:1) Meier	Attendance: 12,000; Referee: (Switzerland) Helbling Uznach

7 February 1960 Round 5 replay	Young Boys	5–3	Basel	Wankdorf Stadium, Bern
14:30	Meier 1' (1:0); Wechselberger 58' (2:2); Wechselberger 663:2'; Meier 80' (4:3); Wechselberger 88' (5:3)	Summary	14' (1:1) Weber; 32' (1:2) Frigerio; 79' (3:3) Hügi (II)	Attendance: 7,500; Referee: (Switzerland) Josef Gulde St. Gallen

== See also ==
- History of FC Basel
- List of FC Basel players
- List of FC Basel seasons

== Sources ==
- Die ersten 125 Jahre. Publisher: Josef Zindel im Friedrich Reinhardt Verlag, Basel. ISBN 978-3-7245-2305-5
- The FCB team 1959–60 at fcb-archiv.ch
- Switzerland 1959–60 by Erik Garin at Rec.Sport.Soccer Statistics Foundation
