= Roland Denicola =

Swiss footballer (born 1939)

Personal information
- Full name: Roland Denicola
- Date of birth: 6 February 1939 (age 87)
- Position: Forward

Senior career*
Years	Team	Apps	(Gls)
1961–1962	FC Basel	4	(1)
- * Club domestic league appearances and goals

Roland Denicola (born 6 February 1939) is a Swiss former footballer who played for FC Basel in the early 1960s as a forward.

Denicola joined Basel's first team for their 1961–62 season under manager Jiří Sobotka. After one match in the 1961–62 International Football Cup and one test game, Denicola made his domestic league debut for the club in the home game at the Landhof on 11 November 1961. He scored his first goal for his club in the same game as Basel won 4–2 against Zürich.

In his only season with the club, Denicola played eight games for Basel and scored twice. Four of the games were in the Nationalliga A, one in the Swiss Cup, one in the International Football Cup and the other two were friendly games. He scored once in the domestic league and once during a test game.

== Sources ==
- Die ersten 125 Jahre. Publisher: Josef Zindel im Friedrich Reinhardt Verlag, Basel. ISBN 978-3-7245-2305-5
- Verein "Basler Fussballarchiv" Homepage
