= Jan van der Meer (Dutch footballer) =

Dutch footballer

- ADO vs.Ajax in 1961, Jan van der Meer lying on the ground

Personal information
- Full name: Johannes Cornelis Boudewijn van der Meer
- Date of birth: 25 April 1936
- Place of birth: The Hague, Netherlands
- Date of death: 9 September 2018 (aged 82)
- Place of death: Ferwert, Netherlands
- Position: Defender

Youth career
- ADO

Senior career*
Years	Team	Apps	(Gls)
1956–1961	ADO	120	(0)
1961–1962	Leeuwarden	32	(0)
1962–1963	PSV	14	(0)
1964–1966	Cambuur	32	(4)
Total		198	(4)
- * Club domestic league appearances and goals

Jan van der Meer (25 April 1936 – 9 September 2018) was a Dutch footballer who played as a defender.

== Club career ==
Van der Meer came through the youth ranks of ADO and was part of the team that won the 1956-57 Eerste Divisie title, clinching promotion to the Eredivisie for the first time in the club's history. After fellow defenders Jan Villerius and Hans van der Hoek joined ADO, van der Meer left for VV Leeuwarden and later PSV. He returned to Leeuwarden to join the recently-founded Cambuur in 1964.

== Personal life ==
After retiring as a player, van der Meer stayed in Friesland and took up his former job as physiotherapist and worked as a swimming instructor in Stiens. He was married to Geeske and they had three children. Van der Meer passed away in Ferwert in 2018.
