= Jan Villerius =

Dutch footballer

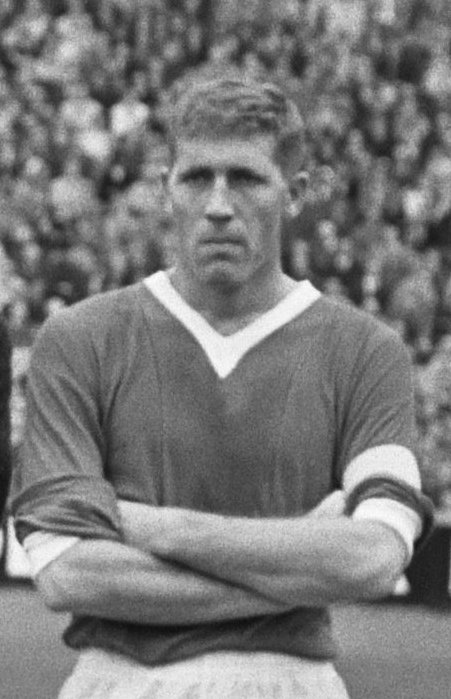

Personal information
- Full name: Johannes Villerius
- Date of birth: 8 February 1939
- Place of birth: Rotterdam, Netherlands
- Date of death: 7 May 2013 (aged 74)
- Place of death: Netherlands
- Height: 1.90 m (6 ft 3 in)
- Positions: Defender; midfielder

Youth career
- 1948–1957: Xerxes

Senior career*
Years	Team	Apps	(Gls)
1957–1958	Xerxes		
1958–1961	Sparta	37	(0)
1961–1968	ADO	206	(2)
1968–1969	RCH		

International career^{‡}
1962	Netherlands	1	(0)
- * Club domestic league appearances and goals as of 5 April 2013 ‡ National team caps and goals as of 5 April 2013

Jan Villerius (8 February 1939 – 7 May 2013) was a Dutch football player.

== Club career ==
A big defender or midfielder, Villerius played for Xerxes with future Feyenoord-legend Coen Moulijn before making his debut for Sparta in December 1958. He won the 1958–59 Eredivisie league title with them in his first year when he played alongside Sparta greats Tonny van Ede and Tinus Bosselaar.

He later moved to ADO, whom he captained and for whom he played over 300 matches and was part of the ADO side that played as San Francisco Gales in the United Soccer Association in 1967, Dick Advocaat being one of his teammates.

== International career ==
Villerius earned his one and only cap for the Netherlands in an October 1962 friendly match against Belgium.

== Retirement and death ==
After his playing career, he became an amateur football coach. Villerius died after a long battle against cancer on 7 May 2013 at the age of 74.
