= Danani =

Danani is a surname. Notable people with the surname include:

- Antonio Danani (born 1938), Swiss retired football player
- Santiago Danani (born 1995), Argentine professional volleyball player
