= Jean-Claude Bourgnon =

Swiss footballer

Personal information
- Full name: Jean-Claude Bourgnon
- Position: Striker

Senior career*
Years	Team	Apps	(Gls)
1960–1961	FC Basel	2	(0)
- * Club domestic league appearances and goals

Jean-Claude Bourgnon is a former footballer who played for FC Basel in the early 1960s. He played as striker.

Bourgnon joined FC Basel's first team for their 1960–61 season under trainer Jenö Vincze. Brendle played his domestic league debut for the club in the away game on 26 March 1961 as Basel played a goalless draw against Young Boys.

In his one season with the club Bourgnon played a total of three games for Basel without scoring a goal. Two of these games were in the Nationalliga A and the other was a friendly game.

== Sources ==
- Die ersten 125 Jahre. Publisher: Josef Zindel im Friedrich Reinhardt Verlag, Basel. ISBN 978-3-7245-2305-5
- Verein "Basler Fussballarchiv" Homepage
