= Ludwig Schraut =

Swiss footballer (born 1935)

Personal information
- Full name: Ludwig Schraut
- Date of birth: 9 September 1935 (age 91)
- Place of birth: Switzerland
- Position: Striker

Senior career*
Years	Team	Apps	(Gls)
1959–1960	FC Basel	8	(0)
- * Club domestic league appearances and goals

Ludwig Schraut (born 9 September 1935) is a Swiss retired footballer who played for FC Basel as a forward.

Schraut joined FC Basel's first team for their 1959–60 season under manager Jenő Vincze. After two test games, Schraut played his domestic league debut for the club in the home game at the Landhof on 30 August 1959 as Basel lost 0–2 against Biel-Bienne.

During his one season with the club, Schraut played a total of 12 games for Basel scoring one goal. Eight of these games were in the Nationalliga A, one in the Swiss Cup and three were friendly games. He scored his only goal in the test game on 8 August 1959 as Basel won 6–1 against local team SC Kleinhüningen.

== Sources ==
- Die ersten 125 Jahre. Publisher: Josef Zindel im Friedrich Reinhardt Verlag, Basel. ISBN 978-3-7245-2305-5
- Verein "Basler Fussballarchiv" Homepage
