= Wilfried Fritz =

German footballer

Personal information
- Full name: Wilfried Fritz
- Date of birth: 4 June 1940 (age 86)
- Place of birth: Germany
- Positions: Midfielder; striker

Senior career*
Years	Team	Apps	(Gls)
1961–1963	FC Basel	22	(6)
- * Club domestic league appearances and goals

Wilfried Fritz (born 4 June 1940) is a German former footballer who played for FC Basel in the early 1960s. He played mainly in the position of striker, but also as midfielder.

Fritz joined Basel's first team for their 1961–62 season under manager Jiří Sobotka. Fritz played his domestic league debut for the club in the away game on 27 August 1961 as Basel played against Lausanne-Sport. He scored his first goal for his club on 10 September in the away game against Grasshopper Club. In fact he scored two goals in that game, but he could not save Basel from a 3–4 defeat.

Fritz played two seasons for Basel. Between the years 1961 and 1963 he played a total of 32 games for them scoring a total of eight goals. 22 of these games were in the Nationalliga A, four in the Swiss Cup, one in the International Football Cup and five were friendly games. He scored six goals in the domestic league and the other two were scored during the test games.

== Sources ==
- Die ersten 125 Jahre. Publisher: Josef Zindel im Friedrich Reinhardt Verlag, Basel. ISBN 978-3-7245-2305-5
- Verein "Basler Fussballarchiv" Homepage
