= Hans van der Hoek =

Dutch footballer

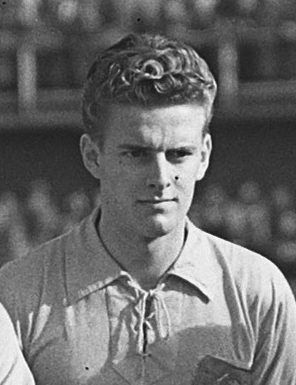
- Hans van der Hoek in 1953

Personal information
- Full name: Johannes Willem van der Hoek
- Date of birth: 5 May 1933
- Place of birth: Rotterdam, Netherlands
- Date of death: 4 February 2017 (aged 83)
- Position: Defender

Senior career*
Years	Team	Apps	(Gls)
1950–1960	Feijenoord	176	(24)
1960–1961	SC Enschede	13	(1)
1961–1962	ADO	29	(1)
Total		218	(26)

International career
1953–1954	Netherlands	2	(0)
- * Club domestic league appearances and goals

Johannes Willem "Hans" van der Hoek (5 May 1933, Rotterdam, Netherlands – 4 February 2017) was a Dutch footballer who was under contract at Feijenoord, SC Enschede, and ADO.

== Club career ==
Born in the southern part of Rotterdam, Van der Hoek made his debut for local side Feijenoord in 1950 and played 176 matches, scoring 24 goals for the club. He later had an unsuccessful spell at SC Enschede and also played for Ernst Happel's ADO, replacing Jan van der Meer who had left for Leeuwarden.

== International career ==
Van der Hoek played twice for the Netherlands: away against Norway in 1953 and Belgium in 1954.

== Personal life ==
During his career, van der Hoek twice broke his shin and due to injury, he had to quit playing football aged 29. He later coached amateur sides Papendrecht, CKC, Alblasserdam, Hellevoetsluis and SC Feyenoord. He died in 2017.

== Statistics ==
=== Club band ===
Season	Club	Country	Competition	Wed.	Goals
1950/51	Feyenoord	Netherlands	Eerste klasse	-	-
1951/52	Feyenoord	Netherlands	Eerste klasse	-	-
1952/53	Feyenoord	Netherlands	Eerste klasse	-	-
1953/54	Feyenoord	Netherlands	Eerste klasse	-	-
1954/55	Feyenoord	Netherlands	Eerste klasse	-	-
1955/56	Feyenoord	Netherlands	Hoofdklasse	-	-
1956/57	Feyenoord	Netherlands	Eredivisie	26	0
1957/58	Feyenoord	Netherlands	Eredivisie	22	0
1958/59	Feyenoord	Netherlands	Eredivisie	6	2
1959/60	Feyenoord	Netherlands	Eredivisie	0	0
1960/61	SC Enschede	Netherlands	Eredivisie	13	1
1961/62	ADO	Netherlands	Eredivisie	29	1
Totaal				96	4

== See also ==
- List of Feyenoord players
- List of Netherlands international footballers
