= Edmund Vogt =

Swiss footballer (born 1941)

Edmund "Edi" Vogt
Personal information
- Full name: Edmund Vogt
- Date of birth: 7 November 1941 (age 84)
- Place of birth: Switzerland
- Positions: Defender; midfielder

Senior career*
Years	Team	Apps	(Gls)
1960–1963	FC Basel	33	(1)
1963–1966	FC Biel-Bienne	39	(3)
1966–1969	Xamax	55	(0)
- * Club domestic league appearances and goals

Edmund "Edi" Vogt (born 7 November 1941) is a Swiss former footballer who played during the 1960s. He played mainly in the position as defender, but also as midfielder.

Vogt played his youth football with FC Basel and joined their first team for their 1960–61 season under trainer Jenö Vincze. Vogt played his domestic league debut for the club in the home game at the Landhof on 4 September 1960 as Basel won 3–1 against Chiasso. He scored his first goal for his club on 7 April 1963 in the away game as Basel drew 2–2 with Young Boys.

Between the years 1960 and 1963 Vogt played a total of 51 games for Basel scoring a total of two goals. 33 of these games were in the Nationalliga A, five in the Swiss Cup, one in the Cup of the Alps, four in the International Football Cup and eight were friendly games. He scored one goal in the domestic league, the other was scored during the test games.

After his time with Basel, Vogt played three seasons for Biel-Bienne and then another three seasons for Xamax.

== Sources ==
- Die ersten 125 Jahre. Publisher: Josef Zindel im Friedrich Reinhardt Verlag, Basel. ISBN 978-3-7245-2305-5
- Verein "Basler Fussballarchiv" Homepage
