= Peter Brendle =

Swiss footballer

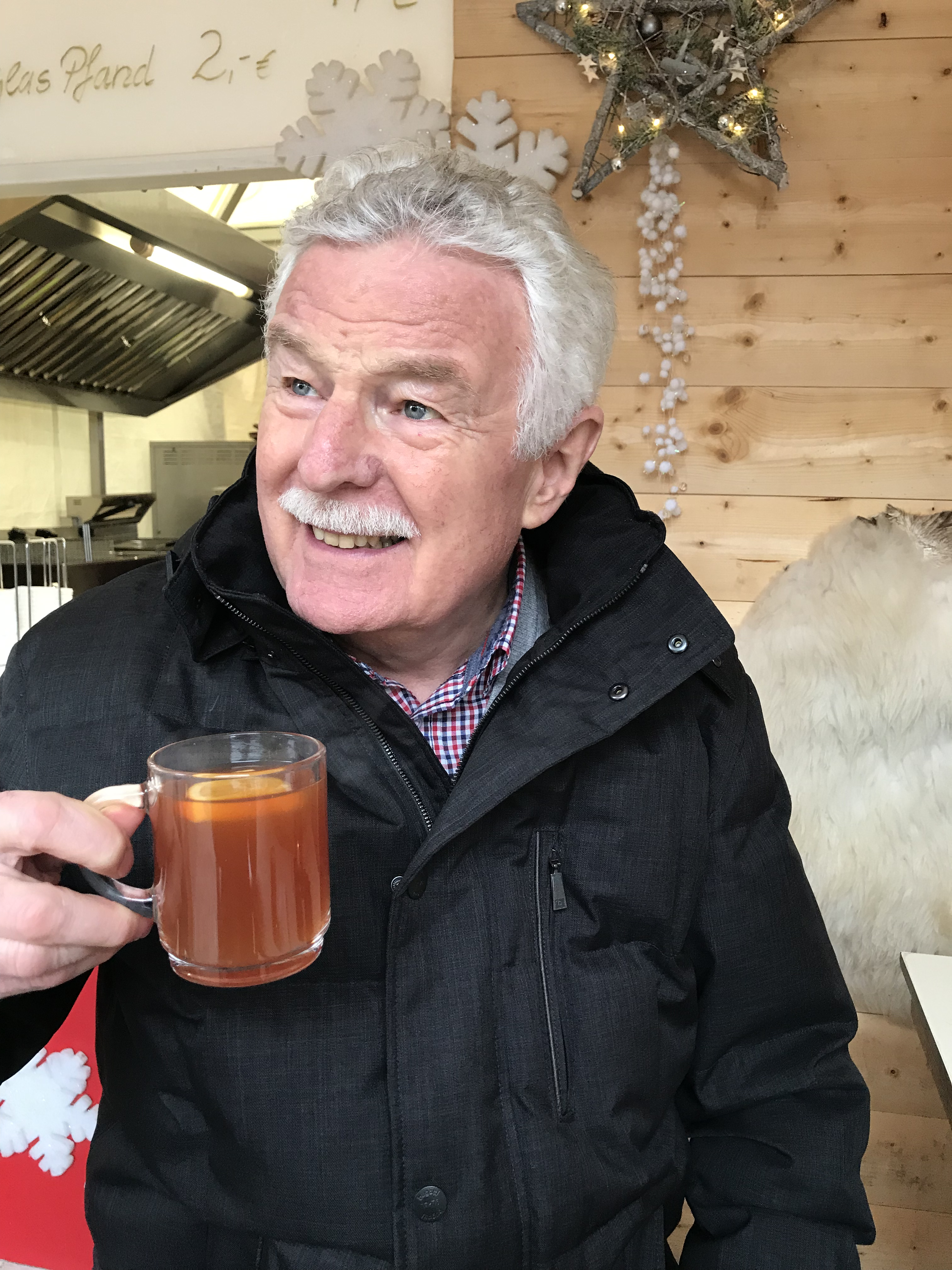
Peter Brendle

Peter Brendle was born in Basel, Switzerland on 1 October 1943. Following an early career as an athlete, and after completing an apprenticeship in print and typesetting, Brendle emigrated to Australia where he forged a long and successful career in the music and entertainment industry. Brendle relocated to Germany in the late 90's, working to bring Australian culture to the region.

== Sporting career ==
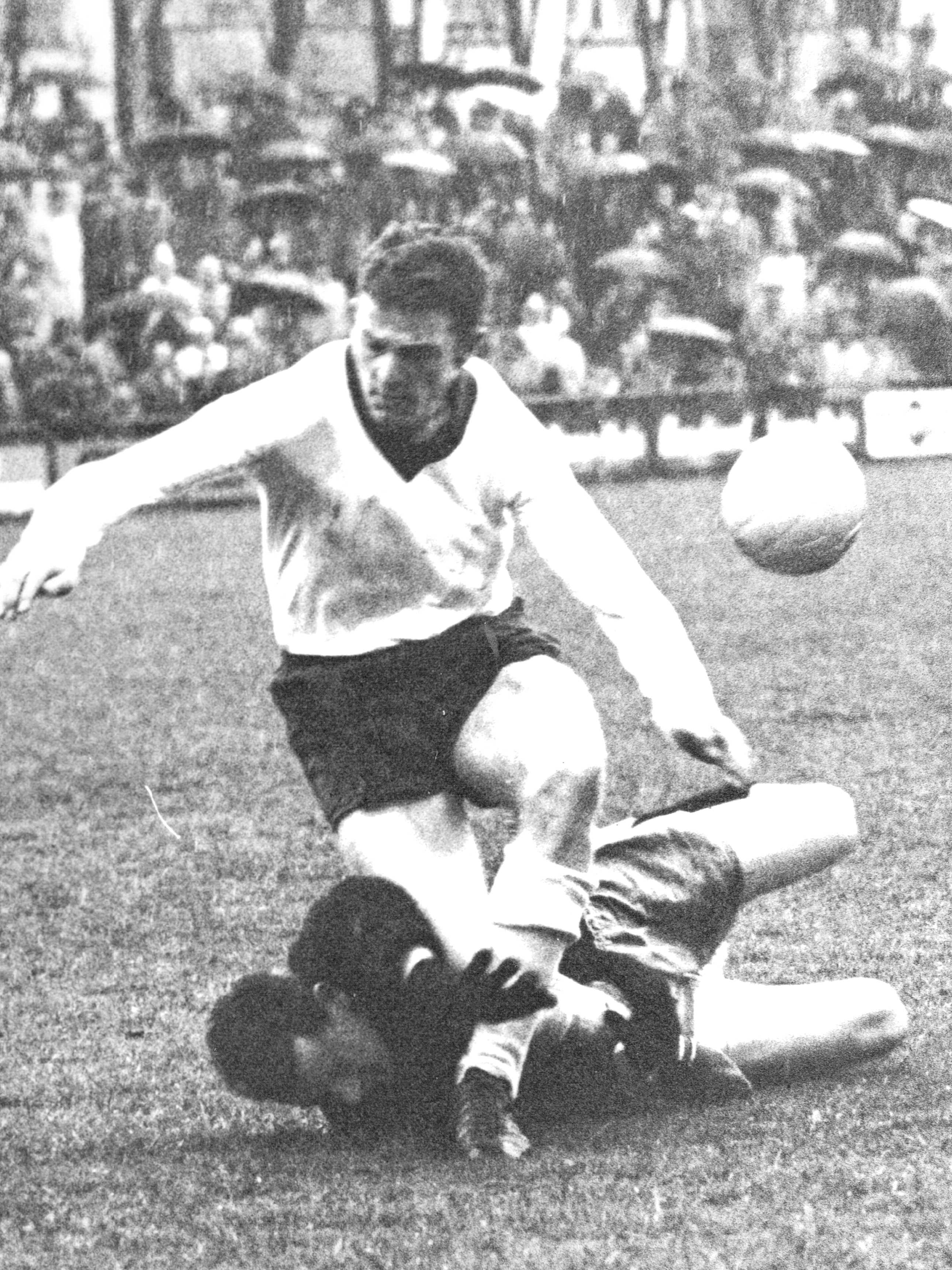
Peter Brendle, FC Basel

Peter Brendle
Personal information
- Date of birth: 1 October 1943 (age 83)
- Place of birth: Switzerland
- Position: Midfielder

Senior career*
Years	Team	Apps	(Gls)
1960–1961	FC Basel	4	(0)
- * Club domestic league appearances and goals

Peter Brendle is a former Swiss National League footballer who played for Swiss teams FC Basel and FC Concordia in the early 1960s as striker.

Brendle joined FC Basel's first team for their 1960–61 season under trainer Jenö Vincze. Brendle played his domestic league debut for the club in the away game on 11 December 1960 as Basel played against Young Fellows Zürich. During his time at FC Basel, Brendle played alongside club legend Josef Hügi and against Swiss actor Hannes Schmidhauser, best known for his role as 'Uli der Knecht'

In his time with the club, Brendle played a total of six games for Basel scoring one goal. Four of these games were in the Nationalliga A and the other two were friendly games. He scored his only goal for his club in a friendly game at the Landhof on 12 February 1961 against Grasshopper Club.

Following a serious foot injury during a home game on March 19, 1961 at the Landhof, Brendle joined TV KleinBasel’s track & field team, where he became a junior champion winning a ‘laurel wreath’ in Decathlon at the largest Swiss Sports Event, the Federal Gymnastics Festival (Lorbeerkranz am Eidgenössischen Turnfest 1963); as a multi-talented sportsman, he also played Handball in the Swiss National B League for TVKB. During the football season 1962/63 he was bought by FC Concordia from FC Basel, where he continued competing in track & field competitions while also becoming the top season-scorer for the Football Club. Brendle was later selected for the Basel team to play Munich in Munich for the Messestädte Cup (now UEFA League) but the game was cancelled due to thick fog.

In 1960 Brendle was also a member of the Swiss Junior National Team and attended a number of training camps at the famous Magglingen Swiss Federal Institut of Sport (7). While traveling to Australia, Brendle played the 1964/65 season in Canada with ‘Germanias Winnipeg’, winning the Canadian National A League Champion Crown (not only was he the leading goal scorer, he won also the best player award).

On returning to Basel from Australia, Brendle was asked by former FC Basel player Mike Speidel to join his FC Pratteln Liga for the remainder of the 1966/67 season, Speidel required an experienced player to serve as a mentor and example to his very young team, two of which, then teenagers Stohler & Demarmels later became Swiss Internationals and regular key players with FC Basel.

== Entrepreneurship ==
A jazz lover from an early age, Brendle’s professional career as a jazz (cultural arts) concert promoter and band manager started in Australia in the mid-1970’s. For over 25 years Brendle was a major jazz concert & club promoter in Australia, co-producing records for James Morrison (Postcards from Downunder with Ken Done), Jane Rutter, Galapagos Duck, Col Nolan and Errol Buddle. He managed and organised overseas tours for Australia’s leading bands and musicians including Don Burrows, Lloyd Swanton, Judy Bailey, Galapagos Duck (Montreux Jazz Festival), Col Nolan, James Morrison, Ricky May, Bob and Len Barnard, the Australian Jazz Orchestra with Paul Grabowski, Dale Barlow, Bernie McGann and Bob Bertles.

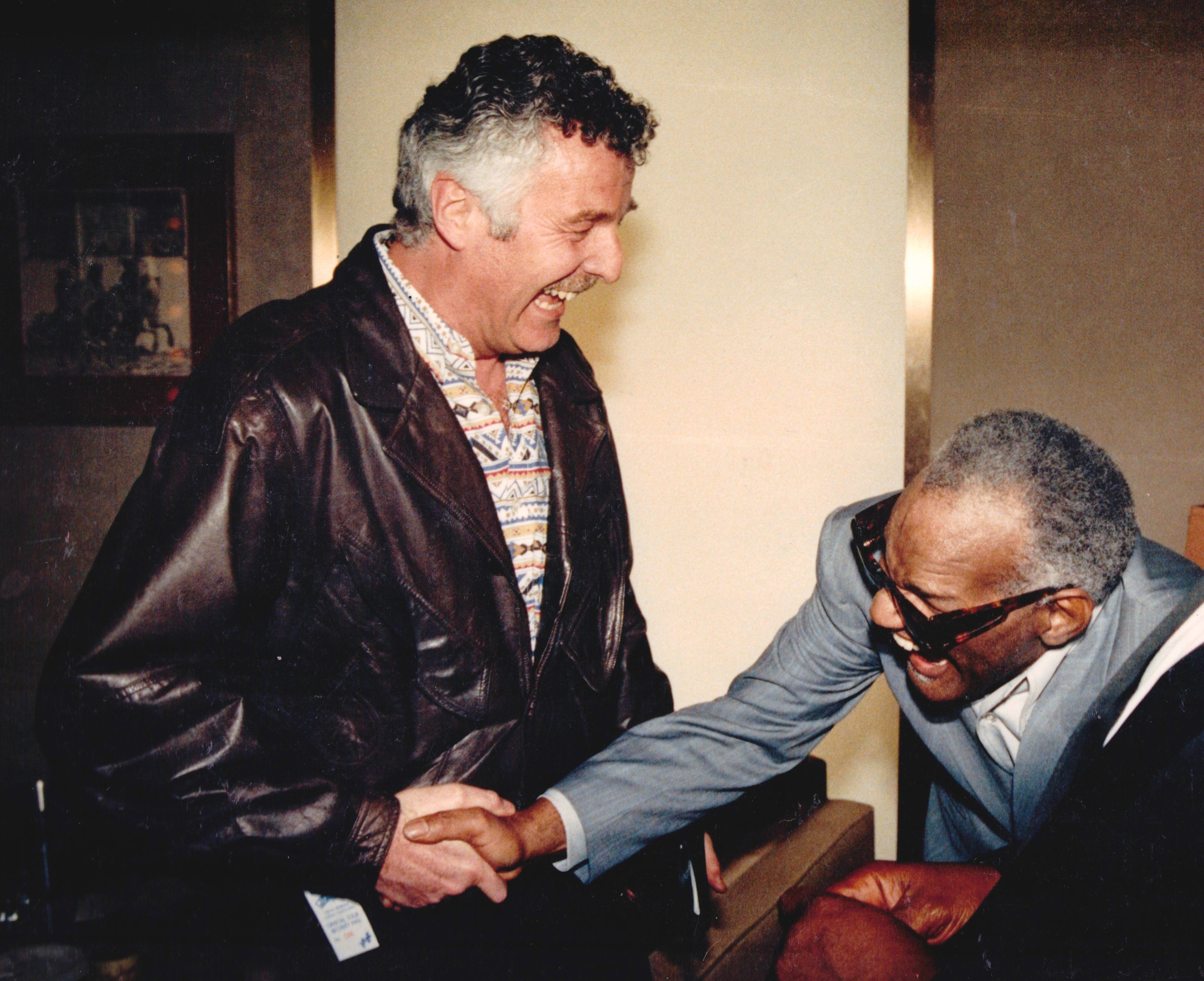
Peter Brendle and Ray Charles

In the 1980’s and 90’s Brendle presented or co-presented touring artists including Ray Charles, BB King, Dave Brubeck, Dizzy Gillespie, Herbie Mann, Lee Konitz, Winton Marsalis, Toshiko Akyoshi, Dianne Reeves, Sonny Terry & Brownie McGhee, Ray Brown, Harry ‘Sweets’ Edison, Ricky May, Ronnie Scott, Chuck Mangione, Eberhard Weber, Barney Kessel, Herb Ellis, Kenny Burrell, James Moody, Mark Murphy, Egberto Gismondi, Nana Vasconcelos.

In 1984 Brendle organised a promotional tour of Sesame Street in Australia. Featuring Caroll Spinney's original Big Bird, the tour culminated in a series of live concerts with the Melbourne Symphony Orchestra on the banks of the Yarra River in Melbourne, and with the ABC Orchestra in front of the Sydney Opera House.

Brendle continued his passion for the arts following his relocation to Europe. Working with various cultural and government organisations, including the Australia Council and Australian Embassy, he managed and coordinated a number of performers and acts to tour Europe. In 1999, he was heavily involved in presenting Australian artists at Weimar99. The city of Weimar, best known for its famous residents—writers Goethe and Schiller—was designated ‘Cultural Capital of Europe’ in 1999, an honour that inspired a series significant cultural events culminating in Weimar99. Brendle oversaw a number of performances including Meryl Tankard’s Australian Dance Theatre and Benedict Andrews’ interpretation of Goethe’s ‘Urfaust’, a joint presentation of Bernd Kauffmann's Weimar99 & Robyn Archer’s Adelaide Festival.

== Sources ==
- Die ersten 125 Jahre. Publisher: Josef Zindel im Friedrich Reinhardt Verlag, Basel. ISBN 978-3-7245-2305-5
- Verein "Basler Fussballarchiv" Homepage
