= Fernando Von Krannichfeldt =

Swiss footballer (born 1940)

Personal information
- Full name: Fernando Von Krannichfeldt
- Date of birth: 18 February 1940 (age 86)
- Place of birth: Switzerland
- Position: Striker

Senior career*
Years	Team	Apps	(Gls)
1959–1960	Mendrisiostar		
1960–1965	FC Basel	19	(6)
1965–1966	FC Baden		
- * Club domestic league appearances and goals

Fernando Von Krannichfeldt (born 18 February 1940) is a Swiss former footballer who played in the 1960s as a striker.

Von Krannichfeldt played for Mendrisiostar and then joined FC Basel's first team during their 1960–61 season under trainer Jenö Vincze. After one test match, Von Krannichfeldt played his domestic league debut for the club in the home game at the Landhof on 19 April 1961 as Basel won 2–0 against Lausanne-Sport. He scored his first goal for his club just one week later, on 26 April in the away game against Grasshopper Club as Basel won 4–2. In fact he scored two goals in this game.

Between the years 1960 and 1965, Von Krannichfeldt played a total of 35 games for Basel scoring a total of nine goals. 19 of these games were in the Nationalliga A, two in the Swiss Cup, one in the Cup of the Alps, six in the International Football Cup and seven were friendly games. He scored six goals in the domestic league, one in the Swiss Cup, one in the International Football Cup and the other goal was scored during the test games.

After his time with Basel, Von Krannichfeldt moved on to play for Baden in the Nationalliga B, the second tier of Swiss football.

== Sources ==
- Die ersten 125 Jahre. Publisher: Josef Zindel im Friedrich Reinhardt Verlag, Basel. ISBN 978-3-7245-2305-5
- Verein "Basler Fussballarchiv" Homepage
