= Piet de Vries =

Dutch footballer (born 1939)

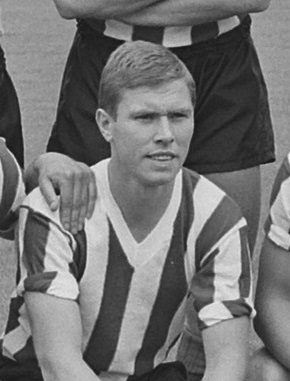
- De Vries in 1963

Personal information
- Full name: Pieter Gijsbertus de Vries
- Date of birth: 6 March 1939 (age 87)
- Place of birth: Rotterdam, Netherlands
- Place of death: Forward

Senior career*
Years	Team	Apps	(Gls)
1965–?	Sparta Rotterdam	212	(54)
?–1967	Holland Sport		
1967–1969	Velox		
1969–1972	Fortuna Vlaardingen		

International career
1959	Netherlands	1	(0)
- * Club domestic league appearances and goals

Pieter Gijsbertus de Vries (born 6 March 1939) is a Dutch former footballer who played as a forward, making over 200 Eredivisie appearances for Sparta Rotterdam. He made one appearance for the Netherlands national team in 1959.
