= Ferenc Stockbauer =

Hungarian footballer (1938–2018)

Ferenc "Franz"/"François" Stockbauer
Personal information
- Full name: Ferenc Stockbauer
- Date of birth: 6 April 1938
- Place of birth: Hungary
- Date of death: 11 April 2018 (aged 80)
- Place of death: Sion, Switzerland
- Position: Striker

Senior career*
Years	Team	Apps	(Gls)
1958–1959	SV Wiesbaden		
1959–1961	FC Basel	19	(1)
1961–1963	Urania Genève Sport	37	(4)
1963–1967	Sion	76	(11)

Managerial career
- 1967–1973: FC Visp
- * Club domestic league appearances and goals

Ferenc "Franz"/"François" Stockbauer (6 April 1938 – 11 April 2018) was a Hungarian professional footballer who played in the 1950s and 1960. Stockbauer fled his country in 1956 following the invasion of Budapest by Soviet troops. He played mainly in the position as forward, but also as midfielder.

Stockbauer played in the season 1958–1959 for SV Wiesbaden. He joined FC Basel's first team for their 1959–60 season under manager Jenő Vincze. After playing in four test matches, Stockbauer played his domestic league debut for his new club in the away game on 23 August 1959 against Grenchen. He scored his first goal for his club in the away game on 27 September as Basel were defeated 2–5 by Servette. Stockbauer stayed in Basel for two season. At the end of the first season the team ended the league in tenth position and the following season in fifth position.

Between the years 1959 and 1961 Stockbauer played a total of 36 games for Basel scoring a total of six goals. 19 of these games were in the Nationalliga A, three in the Swiss Cup, one in the International Football Cup and 13 were friendly games. He scored one goal in the domestic league, one in the Swiss Cup and the other four were scored during the test games.

After his time with Basel, Stockbauer played two seasons for Urania Genève Sport and then he moved on to play four seasons for FC Sion where he ended his playing career. In the season 1964–65 Stockbauer was Swiss Cup winner with Sion. On 19 April 1965 Sion beat Servette at Wankdorf Stadium in Bern. After his playing career he was trainer for various amateur teams including FC Visp. Stockbauer continued to live in Sion until he died on 11 April 2018; he was married to Rita Evéquoz and they had one son.

== Sources ==
- Die ersten 125 Jahre. Publisher: Josef Zindel im Friedrich Reinhardt Verlag, Basel. ISBN 978-3-7245-2305-5
- Verein "Basler Fussballarchiv" Homepage
