= Antonio Danani =

Swiss footballer (born 1938)

Personal information
- Full name: Antonio Danani
- Date of birth: 22 June 1938 (age 88)
- Position: Striker

Senior career*
Years	Team	Apps	(Gls)
1959–1960	FC Moutier		
1960–1961	FC Basel	10	(1)
1963–1964	FC Moutier		
- * Club domestic league appearances and goals

Antonio Danani (born 22 June 1938) is a former Swiss footballer who played in the 1950s and 1960s. He played as striker.

Danani first played FC Moutier in the 1 Liga, the third tier of Swiss football. He then joined FC Basel's first team during their 1960–61 season under trainer Jenö Vincze. After playing in four test games, Danani played his domestic league debut for his new club in the home game at the Landhof on 21 August 1960, as Basel were defeated 1–5 by Young Fellows Zürich. He scored his first goal for his club on 23 October 1960. But his goal did not save Basel from being defeated 1–4 by Winterthur.

In his one season with Basel, Danani played in a total of 15 games for Basel scoring just that one goal. 10 of these games were in the Nationalliga A, one in the Swiss Cup and four were friendly games.

Following his time with Basel, Danani returned to his club of origin, FC Moutier, who, in the meantime, had won promotion to the Nationalliga B in the 1961–62 season.

== Sources ==
- Die ersten 125 Jahre. Publisher: Josef Zindel im Friedrich Reinhardt Verlag, Basel. ISBN 978-3-7245-2305-5
- Verein "Basler Fussballarchiv" Homepage
