= Péter Pázmándy =

Hungarian footballer and coach (1938–2012)

Personal information
- Date of birth: 7 June 1938
- Place of birth: Budapest, Hungary
- Date of death: 23 March 2012 (aged 73)
- Place of death: Geneva, Switzerland
- Position: Defender

Senior career*
Years	Team	Apps	(Gls)
19xx–1956	Vasas		
1957–1968	Servette		
1968–19xx	CS Chênois		

Managerial career
- 1968–1976: CS Chênois
- 1976–1982: Servette
- 1982–1984: Lausanne-Sport
- 1984–1987: Bellinzona
- 1988–1989: FC Sion
- 1989–1990: Servette
- 1991–1995: Stade Nyonnais
- * Club domestic league appearances and goals

Péter Pázmándy (7 June 1938 – 23 March 2012) was a Hungarian football player and coach, active primarily in Switzerland.

== Career ==
Pázmándy, a defender, played for Swiss club Servette between 1957 and 1968, winning two league titles.

After retiring as a player, Pazmandy worked as a coach and manager for a number of Swiss clubs.
