= Wolfgang Walther =

Swiss footballer (born 1940)

Personal information
- Full name: Wolfgang Walther
- Date of birth: 21 December 1940 (age 85)
- Place of birth: Switzerland
- Position: Striker

Senior career*
Years	Team	Apps	(Gls)
1960–1963	FC Basel	31	(9)
- * Club domestic league appearances and goals

Wolfgang Walther (born 21 December 1940) is a Swiss former footballer who played for FC Basel in the early 1960s as striker.

Walther joined FC Basel's first team for their 1960–61 season under trainer Jenö Vincze. Walther played his domestic league debut for the club in the away game on 28 August 1960 as Basel played against Luzern e scored his first goal for his club in the same game as Basel won 1–0. In his next game on 9 October 1960 away against La Chaux-de-Fonds he scored his next goal for his team as Basel won 3–2. At the end of the season Basel finished in fifth position in the table and Walther was the team's second top scorer with five goals behind Josef Hügi. Walter stayed with the team for another two seasons.

Between the years 1960 and 1963 Walther played a total of 53 games for Basel scoring a total of 14 goals. 31 of these games were in the Nationalliga A, four in the Swiss Cup, six in the International Football Cup and 12 were friendly games. He scored nine goals in the domestic league, one in the Swiss Cup, one in the International Football Cup and the other three were scored during the test games.

== Sources ==
- Die ersten 125 Jahre. Publisher: Josef Zindel im Friedrich Reinhardt Verlag, Basel. ISBN 978-3-7245-2305-5
- Verein "Basler Fussballarchiv" Homepage
