= Jean-Louis Gygax =

Swiss footballer (born 1935)

Personal information
- Full name: Jean-Louis Gygax
- Date of birth: 17 June 1935 (age 91)
- Place of birth: Switzerland
- Position: Midfielder

Senior career*
Years	Team	Apps	(Gls)
1958–1959	FC Moutier		
1959–1961	FC Basel	13	(0)
- * Club domestic league appearances and goals

Jean-Louis Gygax (born 17 June 1935) is a Swiss former footballer who played in the 1950s and early 1960s. He played as midfielder.

Gygax first played for FC Moutier in 1. Liga, third tier of Swiss football, winning the championship group West in the 1958–59 season but losing the promotion play-offs.

Gygax joined FC Basel's first team for their 1959–60 season under manager Jenő Vincze. After playing in ine test game, Gygax played his domestic league debut for his new club in the away game on 23 August 1953 against Grenchen.

At the end of the season the team ended the league in tenth position and the following season in fifth position. In these two season with the club Gygay played a total of 26 games for Basel scoring just one goal. 13 of these games were in the Nationalliga A, four in the Swiss Cup and nine were friendly games. It was in the test game on 23 July 1960 that Gygay scored his goal as Basel won 4–2 against SC Kleinhüningen.

== Sources ==
- Die ersten 125 Jahre. Publisher: Josef Zindel im Friedrich Reinhardt Verlag, Basel. ISBN 978-3-7245-2305-5
- Verein "Basler Fussballarchiv" Homepage
