= Peet Petersen =

Dutch footballer (1941–1980)

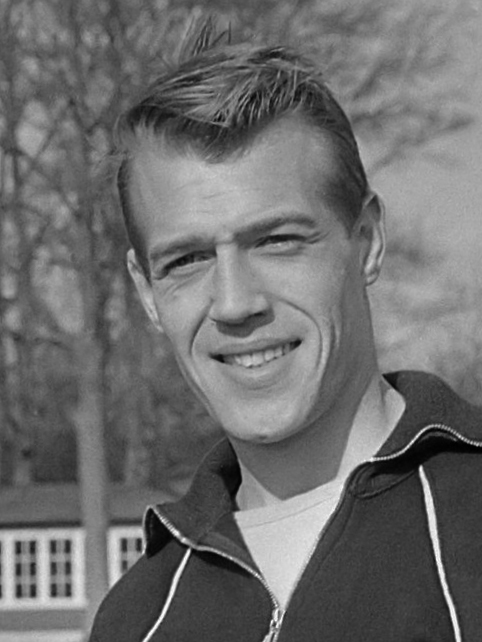

Personal information
- Full name: Peet Petersen
- Date of birth: 18 March 1941
- Place of birth: Amsterdam, Netherlands
- Date of death: 27 December 1980 (aged 39)
- Position: Striker

Senior career*
Years	Team	Apps	(Gls)
1960–1965	Ajax Amsterdam	95	(17)
1965–1966	NAC Breda	?	(?)
1966–1967	De Volewijckers	?	(?)

International career^{‡}
1962–1963	Netherlands	4	(1)
- * Club domestic league appearances and goals ‡ National team caps and goals as of 15 July 2011

Peet Petersen (18 March 1941 in Amsterdam – 27 December 1980) was a Dutch soccer player who played for AFC Ajax en NAC Breda.

Petersen came from the club De Volewijckers from Amsterdam-North and got a contract with Ajax in 1960. His debut for the first team was on 17 August 1960 against V.V. Zeist, but he did not get a regular spot as a left winger on the first team until the 1961-1962 season. He played four matches for the Netherlands national team (taking the place of Coen Moulijn) and scored one goal—the winning goal in 1963 that beat reigning world champion Brazil, 1-0.

In 1964-1965, new Ajax coach Rinus Michels changed tactics and moved Piet Keizer to Petersen's spot, who left in 1965 for NAC.

Outside of his soccer career, Petersen taught physical education at the Parelschool in Amsterdam-East. He was a participant in the 1963 movie Mensen van Morgen ("People of Tomorrow") made by Kees Brusse, in which young people discuss their life and their hopes for the future. Petersen died at age 39 of Cancer.
