= Ulrich Vetsch =

Swiss footballer (1935-2014)

Personal information
- Full name: Ulrich Vetsch
- Date of birth: 15 March 1935
- Place of birth: Grabs, Switzerland
- Date of death: 14 July 2014 (aged 79)
- Place of death: Basel, Switzerland
- Position: Defender

Youth career
- –1953: Grasshopper Club Zürich

Senior career*
Years	Team	Apps	(Gls)
1953–1956	Grasshopper Club	45	(0)
1956–1957	FC Luzern	18	(3)
1957–1958	Grasshopper Club	13	(0)
1958–1959	Young Fellows Zürich	18	(0)
1959–1961	Basel	20	(0)
1961–	FC Aesch		

International career
1954–1955	Swiss national team	1	(0)
- * Club domestic league appearances and goals

Ulrich Vetsch (15 March 1935 – 14 July 2014) was a Swiss footballer who played on the 1950s and early 1960s as defender.

== Club career ==
Vetsch played his youth football by Grasshopper Club Zürich and advanced to their first team who played in the Nationalliga A in 1953. He stayed with GC for three seasons. He then moved for one season to FC Luzern, who at that time played in the Nationalliga B, returning to his club of origin just one season later. Again one season later he moved to Young Fellows Zürich. The Young Fellows suffered relegation at the end of the 1958–59 season and therefore Vetsch moved on again.

Vetsch joined FC Basel's first team for their 1959–60 season under manager Jenő Vincze. After playing in four test matches, Vetsch played his domestic league debut for his new club in the away game on 23 August 1953 against Grenchen. At the end of the season the team ended the league in tenth position and the following season in fifth position.

Between the years 1959 and 1961 Vetsch played a total of 33 games for Basel without scoring a goal. 20 of these games were in the Nationalliga A, two in the Swiss Cup and 11 were friendly games.

== International career ==
Vetsch was called up to the Swiss national team on a number of occasions, but he was capped only once. This was under their caretaker manager Hans Rüegsegger as Switzerland were defeated 3–0 by Hungary in the Puskás Aréna on 10 October 1954.

== Private life ==
After these two seasons with Basel Vetsch retired from his playing career. He played his football at much lower level with local club FC Aesch. There after Vetsch dedicated himself to his job as an engineer at the Gasworks in Basel and to his wife Therese Vetsch-Remund.

== Sources ==
- Josef Zindel (2018). FC Basel 1893. Die ersten 125 Jahre (in German). Basel: Friedrich Reinhardt Verlag. ISBN 978-3-7245-2305-5.
- Verein FC Basel Archiv (in German)
