= Tinus Bosselaar =

Dutch footballer

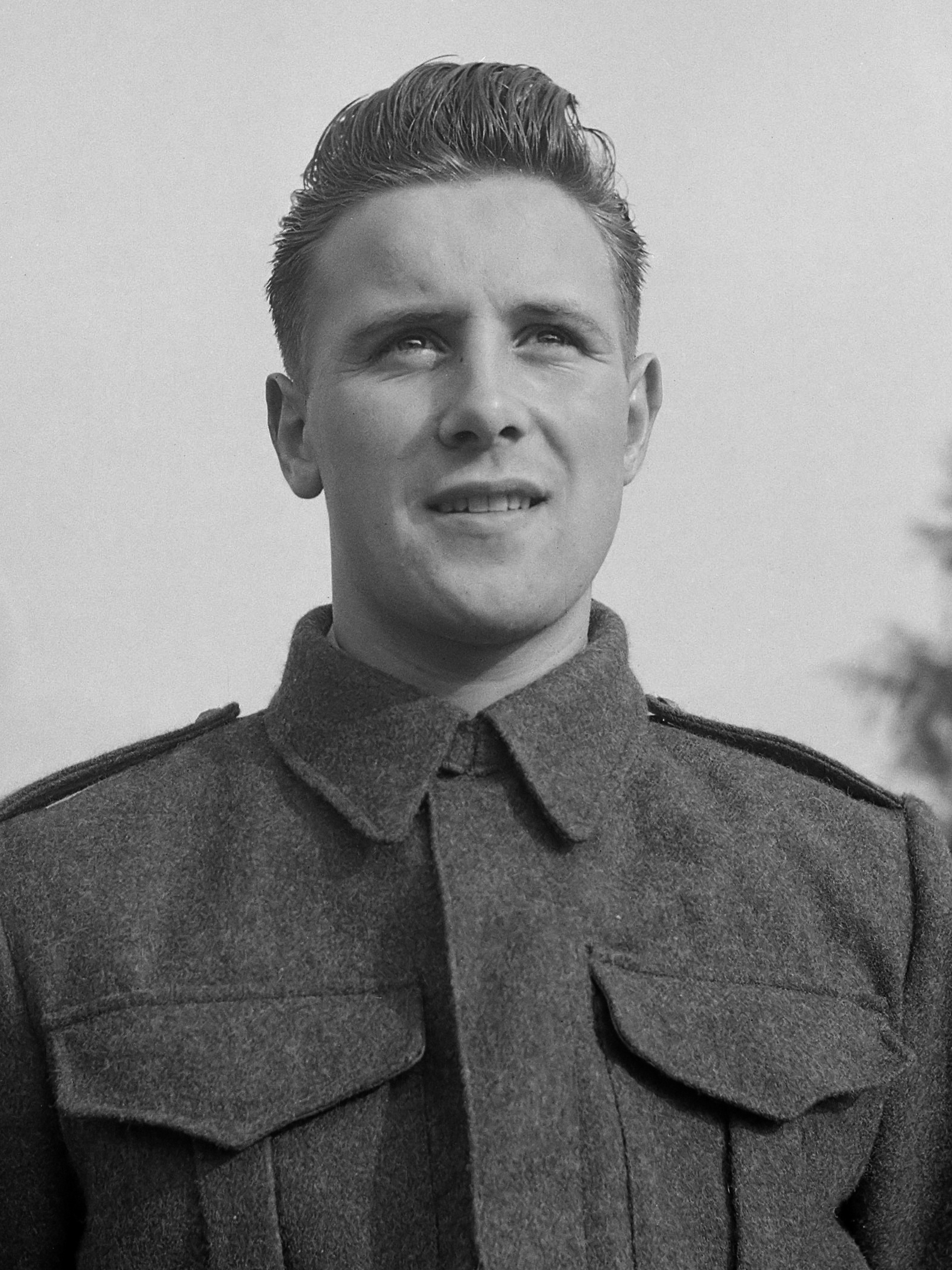
- Bosselaar in 1955

Personal information
- Full name: Martinus Bosselaar
- Date of birth: January 16, 1936
- Place of birth: Rotterdam, Netherlands
- Date of death: June 6, 2018 (aged 82)
- Positions: Winger; inside left

Youth career
- Sparta

Senior career*
Years	Team	Apps	(Gls)
1953–1954	Sparta	29	(9)
1954–1956	Feyenoord	49	(12)
1956–1966	Sparta	246	(49)
Total		324	(70)

International career
1955–1962	Netherlands	17	(4)
- * Club domestic league appearances and goals

Martinus Bosselaar (January 16, 1936 – June 6, 2018) was a Dutch footballer who played as a left winger.

== Club career ==
Hailing from Crooswijk, Bosselaar started his career as an amateur with Sparta in 1953, making his debut against LONGA on 13 September 1953. He scored 9 goals in 29 games for them before leaving for eternal rivals Feyenoord.

Bosselaar became the head subject in the "Bosselaar-affair" in 1956: Bosselaar had left Sparta for Feyenoord in 1954 after a clash with the Sparta board but his contract had a clause saying that he could leave the Rotterdam-South club to rejoin Sparta for free at any time. Feyenoord however did not want to let him go and took Sparta to court. Eventually Feyenoord lost the case and Bosselaar left the club and returned to Sparta.

== International career ==
Bosselaar played his first international match on October 16, 1955, in a 2–2 draw versus Belgium. In his second cap against Norway he netted two of his in total four international goals in a 3–0 win.

== Personal life ==
He retired as a player aged 29, when his father passed away and Bosselaar had to take over his dad's grocery shop. He suffered from a heart attack in 2004. He died on June 6, 2018, at the age of 82.

== Honours ==
Sparta Rotterdam

- Eredivisie: 1958–59
- KNVB Cup: 1957–58, 1961–62, 1965–66
