= Bruno Brizzi =

Swiss footballer (born 1933)

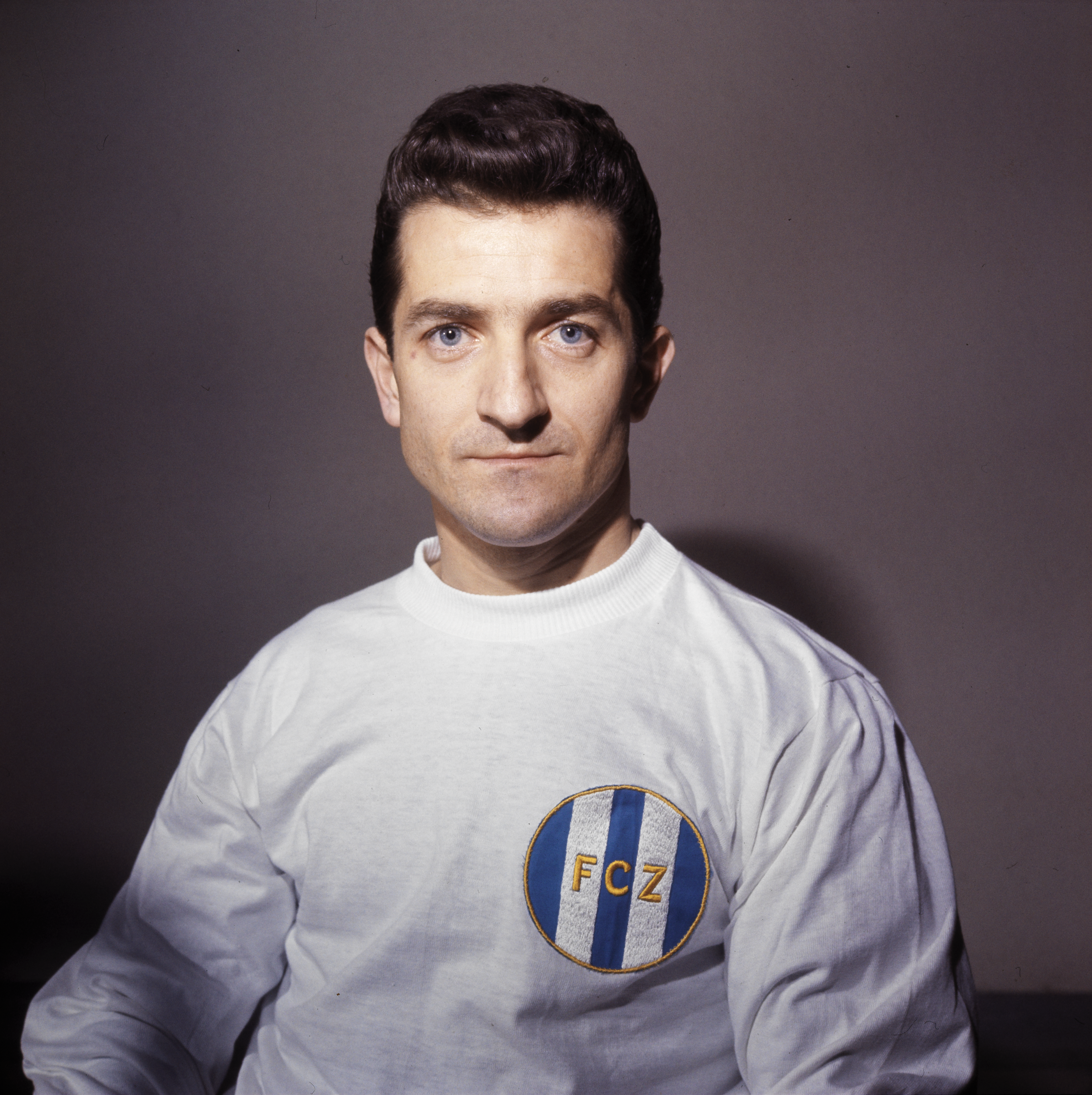

Personal information
- Full name: Bruno Edwin Brizzi
- Date of birth: 2 November 1933 (age 92)
- Place of birth: Zürich, Switzerland
- Height: 1.65 m (5 ft 5 in)
- Position: Midfielder

Senior career*
Years	Team	Apps	(Gls)
1952–1955	FC Blue Stars Zürich		
1955–1958	FC Winterthur		
1958–1965	FC Zürich		
1965–1966	FC St. Gallen		

International career
1958–1964	Switzerland	5	(0)
- * Club domestic league appearances and goals

Bruno Brizzi (born 2 November 1933) is a retired Swiss football midfielder.
