= Tonny van Ede =

Dutch footballer

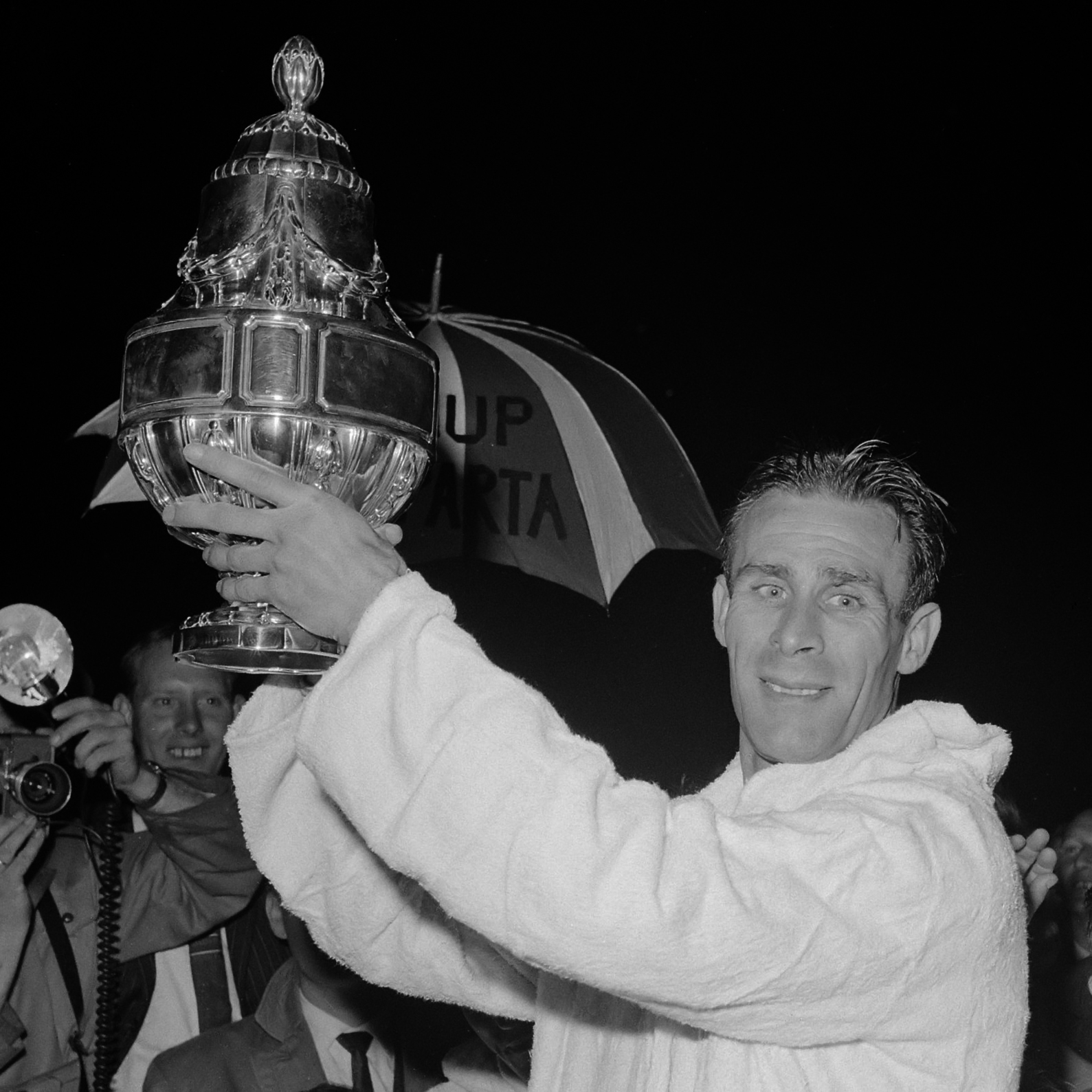
- van Ede in 1962

Personal information
- Full name: Antonie van Ede
- Date of birth: 22 December 1924
- Place of birth: Rotterdam, Netherlands
- Date of death: 16 February 2011 (aged 86)
- Place of death: Zwijndrecht, Netherlands
- Position: Right winger

Youth career
- 1936–1940: Sparta

Senior career*
Years	Team	Apps	(Gls)
1947–1963	Sparta	455	(71)
1963–1965	Hermes DVS	49	(12)

International career^{‡}
1953	Netherlands	2	(0)
- * Club domestic league appearances and goals as of 17 February 2011 ‡ National team caps and goals as of 17 February 2011

Tonny van Ede (22 December 1924 – 17 February 2011) was a Dutch football player.

== Club career ==
Van Ede was a product of the Sparta Rotterdam youth system, joining the club at 11 and making his senior debut in 1947. During the Second World War he was sent to work in Germany but fled to England, where he became a member of the Princess Irene Brigade. He won the 1959 Dutch league title with Sparta and in the next season was part of the first Dutch football team that made it to the European Cup quarter finals. He scored the only goal in an away win at Rangers but Sparta were eliminated when they lost the play-off.

In 1958 and 1962 he won the KNVB Cup with Sparta in addition to that league title.

He finished his career at Hermes DVS in neighboring Schiedam.

== International career ==
Van Ede also played for the Netherlands in friendly matches against Belgium and Norway in April and September 1953.

== Retirement ==
After retiring, van Ede was named honorary member of Sparta and in 2010 the main stand at the Sparta stadium was named after him.

He died on 17 February 2011 at the age of 86.
