= Hans Weber =

Swiss footballer (1934–1965)

Personal information
- Full name: Johann 'Hans' Weber
- Date of birth: 8 September 1934
- Place of birth: Lausanne, Switzerland
- Date of death: 10 February 1965 (aged 30)
- Height: 1.75 m (5 ft 9 in)
- Position: Midfielder

Senior career*
Years	Team	Apps	(Gls)
1949–1955	FC Basel	65	(9)
1955–1957	Lausanne-Sport		
1957–1965	FC Basel	180	(24)

International career
1956–1965	Switzerland	24	(1)
- * Club domestic league appearances and goals

Johann "Hans" Weber (8 September 1934 – 10 February 1965) was a Swiss football midfielder who played for Switzerland in the 1962 FIFA World Cup. He played 13 seasons for FC Basel and two seasons for Lausanne-Sport.

== Football career ==
Weber played his youth football for Basel. In the season 1949–50 he was taken up by their first team. He played his first team debut on 24 September 1950, an away game at the Charmilles Stadium, Geneva, against Servette. He scored his first two goals for the club just one week later on 1 October 1950 in the home game against La Chaux-de-Fonds as Basel won with the end score 4–1. In the 1952–53 season Weber was part of the championship winning team.

For the 1955–56 season Weber transferred to Lausanne-Sport. He played here for two seasons and in 48 domestic league games he scored two goals.

Weber returned to Basel for the 1957–58 season. In the Swiss Cup match on 2 November 1957 against FC Olten, Weber scored five goals during the second half of the game as Basel won 8–0. The Wankdorf Stadium hosted the Swiss Cup Final on 15 April 1963 and Basel played against favorites Grasshopper Club. Two goals after half time, one by Heinz Blumer and the second from Otto Ludwig gave Basel a 2–0 victory. Weber was member of the team on that day. On 26 December 1964 FCB played against Grasshoppers Zürich in the quarter-finals of the Swiss Cup. They decided the match 3–1 for themselves in overtime. This was to be the very last match for the popular Basler captain Weber, because just seven weeks later he died of cancer.

Between his first appearance in September 1950 and his last in December 1964 he made 380 appearances for Basel scoring 68 goals. 245 of these games were in the Nationalliga A, 27 in the Swiss Cup, 8 were European Cup matches and 99 were friendly games. He scored 33 goals in the domestic league, 13 in the Swiss Cup, 2 in the Cup of the Alps and the other 20 were scored during the test games.

== International career ==
Between 1956 and 1965 Weber played for Swiss national football team|. The Swiss team qualified for the 1962 FIFA World Cup. Weber played in all three matches, but each ended in a defeat. In total Weber played in 24 International games and scored one goal.

== Honours and Titles ==
Basel

- Swiss League champions: 1952–53
- Swiss Cup winner: 1963

== Sources ==
- Rotblau: Jahrbuch Saison 2017/2018. Publisher: FC Basel Marketing AG. ISBN 978-3-7245-2189-1
- Die ersten 125 Jahre. Publisher: Josef Zindel im Friedrich Reinhardt Verlag, Basel. ISBN 978-3-7245-2305-5
- Verein "Basler Fussballarchiv" Homepage
