= Paul Speidel =

Swiss footballer (born 1938)

Personal information
- Full name: Paul Speidel
- Date of birth: 26 July 1938 (age 88)
- Place of birth: Switzerland
- Position: Striker

Senior career*
Years	Team	Apps	(Gls)
1958–1959	FC Olten		
1959–1962	FC Basel	27	(2)
1962–1965	Cantonal Neuchatel	23	(0)
- * Club domestic league appearances and goals

Paul Speidel (born 26 July 1938) is a Swiss retired footballer who played in the 1950s and 1960s. He played as a striker.

Speidel first played for FC Olten. He joined FC Basel's first team for their 1959–60 season under manager Jenő Vincze. After four test matches, Speidel played his domestic league debut for his new club in the home game at the Landhof on 24 April 1960 as Basel won 4–0 against La Chaux-de-Fonds. Speidel scored his first league goal for his club on 16 April 1961 in the away game as Basel won 4–2 against Grasshopper Club. It was the last goal of the match.

Between the years 1959 and 1962 Speidle played a total of 48 games for Basel scoring a total of six goals. 27 of these games were in the Nationalliga A, one in the Swiss Cup, six in the International Football Cup and 14 were friendly games. He scored two goals in the domestic league, one in the International Football Cup match against SC Tasmania 1900 Berlin on 8 July 1961 and the other three were scored during the test games.

Following his time with Basel Speidel moved on to play for Cantonal Neuchatel.

== Sources ==
- Die ersten 125 Jahre. Publisher: Josef Zindel im Friedrich Reinhardt Verlag, Basel. ISBN 978-3-7245-2305-5
- Verein "Basler Fussballarchiv" Homepage
