= Otto Ludwig (footballer) =

German footballer

Personal information
- Full name: Otto Ludwig
- Date of birth: 29 November 1934
- Place of birth: Basel
- Date of death: 17 August 2014 (aged 79)
- Place of death: Basel
- Positions: Forward; winger

Senior career*
Years	Team	Apps	(Gls)
1955–1960	FC Basel	20	(3)
1960–1961	Old Boys		
1961–1963	FC Basel	35	(6)
1963–1965	Schaffhausen	33	(3)
- * Club domestic league appearances and goals

Otto Ludwig (29 November 1934 – 17 August 2014) was a German footballer who played for FC Basel during the late 1950s and early 1960s. He played in the position of forward and winger. Ludwig was born in Basel and the grew up in Basel-Breite, a quarter south of the river, as son of German parents.

== Football career ==
Ludwig came to FC Basel as a youth player and advanced to their first team for their 1955–56 season und head coach Béla Sárosi. He played his debut for the team in Swiss Cup on 18 December 1955 in the 6–2 win against Emmenbrücke. He played another cup match with the first team that season and spent the following two seasons with the reserves, again advancing to the first team for their 1958–59 season under head coach Rudi Strittich. After playing in one test match, he played his Nationalliga A debut on 31 August 1958 in the away game as Basel were defeated 2–1by La Chaux-de-Fonds. He scored his first goal with the team on 14 September 1958 against Lausanne-Sport as Basel won 5–0. It was the last goal of the game.

For the season 1960/61 Ludwig played for Old Boys in the 1. Liga, then the third tier of the Swiss football league system. After that season he returned to FC Basel. In the season 1961/62 he played in 18 league games scoring 5 goals. In the season 1962/63 he played 17 league games scoring one goal. On 15 April 1963 the Wankdorf Stadium hosted the Cup Final and Basel played against favorites Grasshopper Club. Two goals after half time, one by Heinz Blumer and the second from Ludwig himself gave Basel a 2–0 victory and their third Cup win in the club's history. He played the full 90 minutes. His him with the FCB first team ended on 9 June 1963, in the last championship match of that season, with an 8-1 win against FC Sion.

Between the years 1955 to 1960 and 1961 to 1963 Ludwig played a total of 92 games for Basel scoring a total of 17 goals. 55 of these games were in the Swiss Serie A, 12 in the Swiss Cup, five in the UEFA Intertoto Cup and 20 were friendly games. He scored 9 goals in the domestic league, one in the Swiss Cup, two in the UEFA Intertoto Cup and the other five were scored during the test games.

Despite winning the Cup title, in the summer of 1963 Ludwig then moved on to Schaffhausen, who also played in the Nationalliga A. But at the end of the 1963–64 season they suffered relegation to the Nationalliga B. Ludwig stayed at the club for another year and returned to Basel to play with the Basel older generation. He was a capable player, who became a real crowd favorite of his time, probably due to his rather small body size.

== Private life ==
Otto Ludwig grew up in the Basel Breite quarter. He was married and the couple lived in Münchenstein. Professionally he worked for the chemical industry, mainly for Hoffmann La Roche. A serious illness, which he patiently endured, shaped his last years. On August 17, 2014, he was released from his suffering.

== Honours and Titles ==
Basel

- Swiss Cup winner: 1962-63

== Sources ==
- Josef Zindel (2018). FC Basel 1893. Die ersten 125 Jahre (in German). Basel: Friedrich Reinhardt Verlag. ISBN 978-3-7245-2305-5.
- Rotblau: Jahrbuch Saison 2017/2018. Publisher: FC Basel Marketing AG. ISBN 978-3-7245-2189-1
- Verein "Basler Fussballarchiv" Homepage
