= Jenő Vincze =

Hungarian footballer

Personal information
- Date of birth: 20 November 1908
- Place of birth: Versec, Kingdom of Hungary (today Vršac, Serbia)
- Date of death: 20 November 1988 (aged 80)
- Height: 1.69 m (5 ft 6 1/2 in)
- Position: Right forward

Youth career
- 1922–1925: Debreceni MTE

Senior career*
Years	Team	Apps	(Gls)
1925–1927	Debreceni VSC		
1927–1934	Debreceni Bocskai	154	(65)
1934–1944	Újpest FC	136	(67)

International career
1930–1939	Hungary	25	(8)

Managerial career
- 1947–1948: Újpesti TE
- 1955: Vasas Izzó
- 1957–1959: Servette FC
- 1959–1961: FC Basel
- 1961–1964: SpVgg Fürth
- 1966–1967: 1. FC Nürnberg
- 1967–1971: 1. FC Schweinfurt 05
- 1971–1975: SpVgg Bayreuth
Medal record
Representing Hungary
FIFA World Cup
Runner-up	1938 France
- * Club domestic league appearances and goals

Jenő Vincze (Serbian: Eugen Vince) (20 November 1908 – 20 November 1988) was a Hungarian footballer and a legend of Újpest FC, most famous for playing for the Hungary national team in the 1938 World Cup Final.

Vincze started playing football for teams based in Debrecen. He became professional in 1927 at Debreceni Bocskai and he was top scorer of the Nemzeti Bajnokság I in the 1930–31 season and moved to Újpest FC in December 1934. He finished his career at Újpest in 1944.

Vincze began his senior career in Debrecen with Bocskai FC, where he won the Magyar Kupa in 1930 and finished as the Nemzeti Bajnokság I joint top goalscorer in the 1930–31 season with 20 goals.

After finishing his career, he became a successful coach.
