= Josef Kiefer =

German footballer

Personal information
- Full name: Josef Kiefer
- Date of birth: 5 December 1942 (age 83)
- Place of birth: Basel
- Height: 1.70 m (5 ft 7 in)
- Position: Defender

Senior career*
Years	Team	Apps	(Gls)
1962–1974	FC Basel	170	(1)
1974–1975	FC Breitenbach		
1979–1982	FC Allschwil		
- * Club domestic league appearances and goals

Josef Kiefer (* 5 December 1942) is a retired German footballer who played for FC Basel. He played in the position of defender.

== Football career ==
Kiefer joined the FC Basel first team for the 1962–63 season under trainer Jiří Sobotka. In this season he played in just three test games, one league match and one match in the Cup of the Alps. He made his Nationalliga A debut on 9 June 1963 in the home match against Sion, which ended in an 8–1 victory. On 15 April 1963 the Wankdorf Stadium hosted the Cup Final and Basel played against favorites Grasshopper Club. Two goals after half time, one by Heinz Blumer and the second from Otto Ludwig gave Basel a 2–0 victory and their third Cup win in their history. In the following season Kiefer advanced to become a regular in the Basel defence.

A well-documented curiosity was the fact that during the winter break of their 1963–64 season the team travelled on a world tour. This saw them visit British Hong Kong, Malaysia, Singapore, Australia, New Zealand, French Polynesia, Mexico and the United States. First team manager Jiří Sobotka together with 16 players and 15 members of staff, supporters and journalists participated in this world tour from 10 January to 10 February 1964. Team captain Bruno Michaud filmed the events with his super-8 camara. The voyage around the world included 19 flights and numerous bus and train journeys. Club chairman, Lucien Schmidlin, led the group, but as they arrived in the hotel in Bangkok, he realised that 250,000 Swiss Francs were missing. The suitcase that he had filled with the various currencies was not with them. He had left it at home, but Swiss Air were able to deliver this to him within just a few days. During the tour a total of ten friendly/test games were played, these are listed in their 1963–64 season. Five wins, three draws, two defeats, but also three major injuries resulted from these test matches. A broken leg for Peter Füri, an eye injury for Walter Baumann and a knee injury for Bruno Michaud soon reduced the number of players to just 13. Kiefer was a member of this tour. He played in all ten of these games.

Kiefer scored his first league goal for the club on 13 March 1966, it was the equaliser in the away 1–1 draw against Young Boys.

In the 1966–67 Nationalliga A season Basel won the championship under player-manager Helmut Benthaus. Basel finished the championship one point clear of FC Zürich who finished in second position. Basel won 16 of the 26 games, drawing eight, losing twice, and they scored 60 goals conceding just 20. Kiefer played in all of the 26 domestic league games.

In that season Basel won the double. In the Cup final on 15 May 1967 Basel's opponents were Lausanne-Sports. In the former Wankdorf Stadium, Basel took an early lead through a goal by Helmut Hauser. The equaliser happened two minutes after the half-time break, Kiefer unluckily deflected a free kick from Lausanne's Richard Dürr into his own goal. It was Kiefer's one and only own goal in his career. Hauser scored the decisive goal via penalty. But the game went down in football history due to the sit-down strike that followed this goal. After 88 minutes of play, with the score at 1–1, referee Karl Göppel awarded Basel a controversial penalty. André Grobéty had pushed Hauser gently in the back and Hauser let himself drop theatrically. Subsequently, after the 2–1 lead for Basel the Lausanne players refused to resume the game and they sat down demonstratively on the pitch. The referee had to abandon the match. Basel were awarded the cup with a 3–0 forfait.

Kiefer won his second title in Basel's 1968–69 season. Basel finished the championship just one point clear of second placed Lausanne Sports. Basel won 13 of their 26 games, drawing ten, losing three times, they scored 48 goals conceding 28. He won the championship with Basel for the third time at the end of the season 1969–70. The team again finished one point clear of Lausanne Sports who ended the season in second position. Basel won 15 of the 26 games, drawing seven, losing four times, they scored 59 and conceded 23 goals.

In 1971–72 Kiefer won the championship for the fourth time. Basel ended the season four points ahead of Zürich this time. Of the 26 league games Basel won 18, drawing seven, losing just once, scoring 66 goals conceding 28. Kiefer won the Swiss championship title for the fifth time in the 1972–73 Nationalliga A season. Basel won the championship four points ahead of Grasshopper Club. Basel won 17 of their 26 league games, drew five and lost four. They scored a total of 57 goals conceding 30.

In the seasons 1969–70, 1971–72 and 1972–73 FC Basel reached the Swiss Cup Final, but on all three occasions they were defeated in by FC Zürich.

Between the years 1962 and 1974 Kiefer played a total of 355 games for Basel scoring a total of three goals. 170 of these games were in the Nationalliga A, 32 in the Swiss Cup, one in the Swiss League Cup, 50 were on European level and 102 were friendly games. He scored one goal in the domestic league, one in the Cup of the Alps and the other was scored in the test game against Biel-Bienne on 5 August 1971 which Basel won 5–0.

After the 1973–74 season Kiefer transferred to FC Breitenbach and in 1979 he moved onto FC Allschwil where he ended his active football career.

== Honours ==
Basel

- Swiss League champions: 1966–67, 1968–69, 1969–70, 1971–72, 1972–73
- Swiss Cup winner: 1966–67
- Swiss Cup runner-up: 1969–70, 1971–72, 1972–73
- Swiss League Cup winner: 1972
- Coppa delle Alpi winner: 1969, 1970
- Uhren Cup winner: 1969, 1970

== Sources ==
- Rotblau: Jahrbuch Saison 2017/2018. Publisher: FC Basel Marketing AG. ISBN 978-3-7245-2189-1
- Die ersten 125 Jahre. Publisher: Josef Zindel im Friedrich Reinhardt Verlag, Basel. ISBN 978-3-7245-2305-5
- Verein "Basler Fussballarchiv" Homepage
