= 1962–63 FC Basel season =

FC Basel
1962–63 season
- Chairman: Lucien Schmidlin
- Manager: Jiří Sobotka
- Ground: Landhof; St. Jakob Stadium, Basel
- Nationalliga A: 6th
- Swiss Cup: Winners
- Inter-Cities Fairs Cup: First round
- UEFA Intertoto Cup: Group stage
- Cup of the Alps: Group stage
- Top goalscorer: League: Heinz Blumer (16); All: Heinz Blumer (26)
- Highest home attendance: 12,000 vs Zürich; 21 April 1963
- Lowest home attendance: 1,800 vs Sion; 9 June 1963
- Average home league attendance: 6,130

The 1962–63 season was Fussball Club Basel 1893's 69th season in their existence. It was their 17th consecutive season in the top flight of Swiss football after their promotion in the 1945–46 season. They played their home games either in their old Landhof Stadium or in their new St. Jakob Stadium. Lucien Schmidlin was voted as new club chairman at the AGM to follow Ernst Weber, who had announced his retirement from the position.

== Overview ==
=== Pre-season ===
The Czechoslovak manager Jiří Sobotka was the club manager at this time, he taken the job over from Jenő Vincze a year before. A season earlier many youngsters had joined the team and this pre-season the same occurred again. Rolf Lüdi, Enrico Mazzola and Hansruedi Herr were brought up from reserve team. Abraham Levy and Arnold Hofer joined from local team FC Breitenbach, also Werner Meier joined from local team Nordstern Basel. During the winter break Bruno Gatti joined from Black Stars Basel. One of the biggest transfers made during this time was the transfer of the 19 year old Karl Odermatt from Concordia Basel. Odermatt joined in a swop, Hansueli Oberer and Silvan Thüler went to Concordia. Not only these two players left the squad, Paul Speidel moved on to Cantonal Neuchatel and Josef Hügi (Hugi II) was nearly at the end of his football career. "Seppe" Hugi had played 363 competition games for the club and in these had scored 272 goals, he moved on to play for Zürich.

Basel played a total of 51 games this season. Of these 51, 26 were in the domestic league, six were in the Swiss Cup, three in the Cup of the Alps, six in the International Football Cup (IFC) and ten were friendly matches. Of these friendly games, five were won, three drawn and two ended in a defeat, Basel scored 29 goals and conceded 19.

=== International Football Cup ===
Basel were appointed as one of four Swiss representatives in the International Football Cup (IFC). The 1962–63 IFC took place during the summer break. Basel played in Group B3 together with PSV Eindhoven, HNK Rijeka and Rot-Weiss Oberhausen. Basel ended the group stage in third position, winners of the group were HNK Rijeka who thus advanced to the quarter-finals.

=== Domestic league ===
There were fourteen teams contesting in the 1962–63 Nationalliga A. These were the top 12 teams from the previous season 1961–62 and the two newly promoted teams Chiasso and Sion. The Championship was played in a double round-robin, the champions were to be qualified for 1963–64 European Cup and the bottom placed two teams in the table were to be relegated. Basel finished the championship in sixth position with twenty six points, with ten wins and six draws from 26 matches, scoring 59 goals conceding 51. FC Zürich won the championship. Heinz Blumer was Basel's top scorer this season with 16 goals, Karl Odermatt their second best goal scorer with 14.

=== Swiss Cup ===
In the Swiss Cup Basel started in the 3rd principal round, on 3 November, with a 4–0 home win, in the St. Jakob Stadium against Black Stars. In the 4th round, on 2 December, they played away against Young Boys winning 2–0. In the next round, on 30 December they won 7–1 at home against SC Burgdorf. In the quarter-finals, played on 24 February 1963, Basel were drawn away against Chiasso and Basel achieved a 2–1 victory. The semi-final was played on 24 March in the St. Jakob Stadium. Basel beat Lausanne-Sports 1–0 the winning goal scored by Markus Pfirter. The Wankdorf Stadium hosted the Swiss Cup Final on 15 April and Basel played against favorites Grasshopper Club Zürich. Two goals after half time, one by Heinz Blumer and the second from Otto Ludwig gave Basel a 2–0 victory and their third Cup win in their history.

A unique story for the history books over this Cup season belongs Bruno Gatti. In the third round he was member of the Black Stars team and was knocked out of the competition. During the winter break he was hired by Basel. In the final Gatti played the full 90 minutes and became cup winner. Another note belongs to Peter Füri who played in all the cup games except the Final because he became ill.

=== Cup of the Alps ===
In the Cup of the Alps Basel were drawn into Group 2, together with Juventus, Grasshopper Club and AS Roma. These matches were all played in Basel and in Zürich. Basel played all their matches at home in the St. Jakob Stadium. In their first match, on 16 June 1963, against Juventus, they were defeated 1–5. Their second game was on 19 June against Grasshopper Club and this ended in a draw. The third match was against AS Roma, but they were defeated 1–4. Juventus qualified for final with three victories and AS Roma qualified for third place match with two victories and one defeat.

== Players ==
Note: Flags indicate national team as defined under FIFA eligibility rules; some limited exceptions apply. Players may hold more than one non-FIFA nationality.

| No. | Pos. | Nation | Player |
|---|---|---|---|
| — | GK | SUI | Hans-Ruedi Günthardt |
| — | GK | SUI | René Jeker |
| 1 | GK | SUI | Kurt Stettler |
| 2 | DF | SUI | Peter Füri |
| 3 | DF | SUI | Bruno Michaud |
| 4 | DF | SUI | Hanspeter Stocker |
| 5 | MF | SUI | Hans Weber |
| 6 | MF | SUI | Carlo Porlezza |
| 7 | MF | GER | Otto Ludwig |
| 8 | FW | SUI | Karl Odermatt (from Concordia Basel) |
| 9 | FW | SUI | Markus Pfirter |
| 10 | DF | SUI | Heinz Blumer |
| 11 | FW | GER | Wilfried Fritz |

| No. | Pos. | Nation | Player |
|---|---|---|---|
| — | DF | SUI | René Burri |
| — | MF | GER | Josef Kiefer |
| — | MF | SUI | Rolf Lüdi (from reserve team) |
| — | DF | SUI | Edmund Vogt |
| — | MF | SUI | Hansruedi Herr (from reserve team) |
| — | MF | SUI | Abraham Levy (from FC Breitenbach) |
| — | FW | SUI | Bruno Gatti (from Black Stars Basel) |
| — | MF | SUI | Walter Löffel (from FC Moutier) |
| — | FW | ITA | Enrico Mazzola (new) |
| — | FW | SUI | Arnold Hofer (from FC Breitenbach) |
| — | FW | SUI | Werner Meier (neu Nordstern Basel) |
| — | FW | SUI | Niklaus Stöckli |
| — | MF | SUI | Fernando Von Krannichfeldt |
| — | MF | SUI | Wolfgang Walther |

Players who left the squad

Note: Flags indicate national team as defined under FIFA eligibility rules; some limited exceptions apply. Players may hold more than one non-FIFA nationality.

| No. | Pos. | Nation | Player |
|---|---|---|---|
| — | FW | SUI | Josef Hügi (II) (after IFC to Zürich) |
| — | FW | SUI | Hansueli Oberer (after IFC to Concordia Basel) |

| No. | Pos. | Nation | Player |
|---|---|---|---|
| — | FW | SUI | Roland Denicola |
| — | MF | SUI | Silvan Thüler (to Concordia Basel) |
| — | FW | SUI | Paul Speidel (to Cantonal Neuchatel) |

== Results ==
Legend

Win Draw Loss Postponed

=== Friendly matches ===
==== Preseason ====
| ? Preseason | Luzern | 1–1 | Basel | Luzern |
| | Goal | Summary | Goal |

| ? Preseason | FC Aesch | 1–7 | Basel | Aesch |
| | Goal | Summary | Goal |

| 8 August 1962 Preseason | SV Schopfheim | 2–0 | Basel | Schopfheim |
| | (1:0) (2:0) | Summary |

| 11 August 1962 Preseason | St. Gallen | 1–1 | Basel | Espenmoos, St. Gallen |
| 20:15 | Brändle 80' (1:1) | Summary | 28' (0:1) Blumer | Attendance: 1,500; Referee: (Switzerland) Strässle Steinach |

| 12 August 1962 Preseason | Luzern | 6–3 | Basel | Glarus |
| | Fischer | Summary | Blumer; Pfirter | Referee: (Switzerland) Josef Gulde St. Gallen |

| 18 August 1962 Preseason | FC Porrentruy | 3–4 | Basel | Stade du Tirage, Porrentruy |
| | Lesniak (II) 55' (1:4); Lesniak (II) 57' (2:4); Lesniak (I) 61' (3:4) | Summary | 5' (0:1) Levy; 7' (0:2) Pfirter; 8' (0:3) Odermatt; 32' (0:4) Pfirter | Attendance: 1,600; Referee: (Switzerland) A. Ceretti Biel/Bienne |

==== Mid-season ====
| 10 November 1962 Mid-season | Basel | 3–3 | Lanerossi Vicenza | St. Jakob Stadium, Basel |
| 15:00 | Blumer 9' (1:2); Ludwig 57' (2:3); Ludwig 84' (3:3) | Summary | 6' (0:1) Vinicio; 7' (0:2) Vastola; 26' (1:3) Vinicio | Attendance: 4,000; Referee: (Switzerland) Anton Bucheli Luzern |

| 3 February 1963 Mid-season | Old Boys | 0–2 | Basel | Stadion Schützenmatte, Basel |
| 14:45 | | Summary | 50' (pen. 0:1) Odermatt; 57' (0:2) Blumer | Attendance: 200; Referee: (Switzerland) Gottfried Dienst Basel |

| 9 February 1963 Mid-season | Basel | 6–1 | Schaffhausen | Landhof, Basel |
| 15:00 | Blumer 13' (1:0); Ludwig (2:0); Blumer (3:0); Odermatt 41' (4:0); Weber 63' (5:0); Vogt 69' (6:0) | Summary | (6:1) Fäh | Attendance: 700; Referee: (Switzerland) B. Turin Oberwil |

| 24 April 1963 Mid-season | Basel | 2–1 | Hamburger SV | St. Jakob Stadium, Basel |
| 19:45 | Michaud 33' (pen. 1:1); Fritz 59' (2:1) | Summary | 15' (pen. 0:1) Werner | Attendance: 28,000; Referee: (Switzerland) Zürrer Feldmeilen |

=== Nationalliga A ===
==== League matches ====
| 26 August 1962 Round 1 | Basel | 3–0 | Lugano | Landhof, Basel |
| 15:00 | Levy 13' (1:0); Odermatt 53' (2:0); Odermatt 58' (3:0) | Summary | | Attendance: 4,800; Referee: (Switzerland) Anton Bucheli Luzern |

| 2 September 1962 Round 2 | Servette | 3–1 | Basel | Charmilles Stadium, Geneva |
| | Mekloufi 62' (1:0); Mekloufi 75' (2:0); Georgy 87' (3:1) | Summary | 83' (2:1) Pfirter | Referee: (Switzerland) Zürrer Feldmeilen |

| 7 September 1962 Round 3 | Basel | P | Luzern | Landhof, Basel |

| 14 September 1962 Round 4 | Grenchen | 3–2 | Basel | Stadion Brühl, Grenchen |
| 20:00 | Sidler 25' (1:0); Dubois 74' (2:1); Dubois 84' (3:2) | Summary | 56' (1:1) Meier; 80' (2:2) Fritz | Attendance: 5.000; Referee: (Switzerland) F. Schorer Interlaken |

| 23 September 1962 Round 5 | Basel | 2–2 | Young Boys | Landhof, Basel |
| 15:00 | Blumer 3' (1:0); Stocker 52' (2:2) | Summary | 13' (1:1) Schultheiss; 43' (1:2) Hug | Attendance: 7,800; Referee: (Switzerland) Anton Bucheli Luzern |

| 30 September 196 Round 6 | Zürich | 3–2 | Basel | Letzigrund, Zürich |
| | von Burg 21' (1:0); Brodmann 36' (2:0); Brizzi 52' (3:0) | Summary | 73' (3:1) Weber; 73' (3:2) Blumer | Attendance: 7,800; Referee: (Switzerland) Albert Weber Lausanne |

| 7 October 1962 Round 7 | Basel | 2–1 | Young Fellows Zürich | Landhof, Basel |
| 15:00 | Weber 65' (1:0); Blumer 84' (2:1) | Summary | 80' (1:1) Kyburz | Attendance: 4,500; Referee: (Switzerland) Guinnard Gletterens |

| 14 October 1962 Round 8 | Chiasso | 2–4 | Basel | Stadio Via Comacini, Chiasso |
| | Palazzoli 83' (1:4); Riva 90' (2:4) | Summary | 21' (0:1) Blumer; 31' (0:2) Pfirter; 50' (0:3) Blumer; 62' (0:4) Blumer | Attendance: 2,000; Referee: (Switzerland) Helbling Uznach |

| 21 October 1962 Round 9 | Basel | 3–4 | La Chaux-de-Fonds | Landhof, Basel |
| 15:00 | Blumer 31' (1:2); Weber 47' (2:2); Walther 73' (pen. 3:4) | Summary | 3' (0:1) Antenen; 24' (0:2) Vuilleumier; 54' (2:3) Brossard; 59' (2:4) Antenen | Attendance: 7,500; Referee: (Switzerland) F. Schorer Interlaken |

| 28 October 1962 Round 10 | Biel-Bienne | 1–2 | Basel | Gurzelen Stadion, Biel/Bienne |
| | Stäuble 76' (pen. 1:1) | Summary | 13' (0:1) Stocker; 85' (1:2) Burri | Attendance: 5,000; Referee: (Switzerland) Albert Weber Lausanne |

| 18 November 1962 Round 11 | Basel | 3–1 | Lausanne-Sport | St. Jakob Stadium, Basel |
| 14:30 | Blumer 7' (1:0); Odermatt 14' (2:0); Ludwig 66' (3:1) | Summary | 32' (2:1) Hertig | Attendance: 10,500; Referee: (Switzerland) Strässle Steinach |

| 25 November 1962 Round 12 | Basel | 1–2 | Grasshopper Club | St. Jakob Stadium, Basel |
| 14:30 | Walther 75' (1:1) | Summary | 43' (0:1) Gronau; 88' (1:2) Rognoni | Attendance: 9,000; Referee: (Switzerland) Baumgartner Lausanne |

| 5 December 1962 Round 3 | Basel | 0–2 | Luzern | St. Jakob Stadium, Basel |
| 19:45 | | Summary | 23' (0:1) Stehrenberger (0:2) Pedrazzoli | Attendance: 2,500; Referee: (Switzerland) Othmar Huber Thun |

| 9 December 1962 Round 13 | Sion | 3–3 | Basel | Parc-des-Sports, Sion |
| | Spikofsk 6' (1:0); Anker 25' (2:0); Quentin 55' (3:1) | Summary | (penalty missed) 16′ Stocker; 54' (2:1) Pfirter; 81' (3:2) Pfirter; 90' (3:3) Weber | Attendance: 2,500; Referee: (Switzerland) Zürrer Feldmeilen |

| 17 February 1963 Round 14 | Lugano | 0–3 | Basel | Cornaredo, Lugano |
| | | Summary | 49' (0:1) Blumer; 68' (0:2) Odermatt; 82' (0:3) Blumer | Attendance: 2,500; Referee: (Switzerland) Helbling Uznach |

| 3 March 1963 Round 15 | Basel | 3–2 | Servette | Landhof, Basel |
| 15:00 | Pfirter 28' (1:0); Weber 36' (pen. 2:0); Odermatt 83' (pen. 3:1) | Summary | 55' (2:1) Heuri; 88' (3:2) Heuri | Attendance: 6,000; Referee: (Switzerland) Zürrer Feldmeilen |

| 10 March 1963 Round 16 | Luzern | P | Basel | Stadion Allmend, Luzern |

| 17 March 1963 Round 17 | Basel | 3–5 | Grenchen | Landhof, Basel |
| 15:00 | Odermatt 3' (1:0); Odermatt 51' (2:4); Odermatt 75' (3:4) | Summary | 22' (o.g. 1:1) Stocker; 22' (1:2) Wälti; 42' (1:3) Wälti; 43' (1:4) Wälti; 76' (3:5) Mauron | Attendance: 4,000; Referee: (Switzerland) Anton Bucheli Luzern |

| 7 April 1963 Round 18 | Young Boys | 2–2 | Basel | Wankdorf Stadium, Bern |
| | Daina 47' (1:2); Daina 65' (2:2) | Summary | 1' (0:1) Vogt; 24' (0:2) Blumer | Attendance: 8,000; Referee: (Switzerland) M. Baumberger Lausanne |

| 21 April 1963 Round 19 | Basel | 0–1 | Zürich | Landhof, Basel |
| 15:00 | | Summary | Martinelli | Attendance: 12,000; Referee: (Switzerland) Othmar Huber Thun |

| 28 April 1963 Round 20 | Young Fellows Zürich | 2–4 | Basel | Letzigrund, Zürich |
| 13:00 | Boskov 72' (1:4); Benkö 87' (2:4) | Summary | 6' (0:1) Odermatt; 25' (0:2) Gatti; 52' (0:3) Odermatt; 65' (0:4) Fritz | Attendance: 6,000; Referee: (Switzerland) F. Schorer Interlaken |

| 1 May 1963 Round 16 | Luzern | 1–1 | Basel | Stadion Allmend, Luzern |
| | Fischer 11' (1:0) | Summary | 87' (1:1) Odermatt | Attendance: 4,500; Referee: (Switzerland) Strässle Steinach |

| 5 May 1963 Round 21 | Basel | 2–2 | Chiasso | Landhof, Basel |
| 15:00 | Weber 8' (1:0); Fritz 12' (2:0) | Summary | 55' (2:1) Riva; 59' (2:2) Giovio | Attendance: 4,800; Referee: (Switzerland) Zürrer Feldmeilen |

| 11 May 1963 Round 22 | La Chaux-de-Fonds | 3–2 | Basel | Stade Charrière, La Chaux-de-Fonds |
| 20:00 | Bertschi 3' (1:0); Bertschi 9' (2:0); Bertschi 61' (3:1) | Summary | 44' (2:1) Blumer; 80' (3:2) Blumer | Attendance: 4,500; Referee: (Switzerland) |

| 19 May 1963 Round 23 | Basel | 3–2 | Biel-Bienne | Landhof, Basel |
| 15:30 | Odermatt 29' (1:0); Odermatt 42' (2:0); Kehrl 75' (o.g. 3:1) | Summary | 60' (2:1) Quattropan; 73' (3:2) Ziegler | Attendance: 4,500; Referee: (Switzerland) Karl Göppel Zürich |

| 26 May 1963 Round 24 | Lausanne-Sport | 0–0 | Basel | Olympique de la Pontaise, Lausanne |
| 20:30 | | Summary | | Attendance: 4,500; Referee: (Switzerland) Othmar Huber Thun |

| 2 June 1963 Round 25 | Grasshopper Club | 3–0 | Basel | Hardturm, Zürich |
| | Wütrich 39' (1:0); Kunz 83' (2:0); Duret 90' (3:0) | Summary | | Attendance: 4,500; Referee: (Switzerland) F. Schorer Interlaken |

| 9 June 1963 Round 26 | Basel | 8–1 | Sion | Landhof, Basel |
| | Pfirter 8' (1:0); Pfirter 13' (2:0); Blumer 22' (3:0); Pfirter 40' (4:0); Blumer 44' (5:0); Blumer 48' (6:0); Odermatt 77' (7:1); Weber 84' (8:1) | Summary | 59' (6:1) Gasser | Attendance: 1,800; Referee: (Switzerland) M. Baumberger Lausanne |

==== League table ====
| Pos | Team | Pld | W | D | L | GF | GA | GD | Pts | Qualification |
|---|---|---|---|---|---|---|---|---|---|---|
| 1 | Zürich (C) | 26 | 20 | 4 | 2 | 81 | 33 | +48 | 44 | Swiss Champions, qualified for 1963–64 European Cup and entered 1963–64 Intertoto Cup |
| 2 | Lausanne-Sport | 26 | 18 | 4 | 4 | 81 | 30 | +51 | 40 | Entered 1963–64 Intertoto Cup |
| 3 | La Chaux-de-Fonds | 26 | 12 | 8 | 6 | 55 | 44 | +11 | 32 | Entered 1963–64 Intertoto Cup |
| 4 | Young Boys | 26 | 13 | 5 | 8 | 62 | 49 | +13 | 31 | Entered 1963–64 Intertoto Cup |
| 5 | Servette | 26 | 11 | 4 | 11 | 54 | 39 | +15 | 26 | |
| 6 | Basel | 26 | 10 | 6 | 10 | 59 | 51 | +8 | 26 | Swiss Cup winners, qualified for 1963–64 European Cup Winners' Cup |
| 7 | Grasshopper Club | 26 | 9 | 7 | 10 | 57 | 51 | +6 | 25 | |
| 8 | Biel-Bienne | 26 | 9 | 6 | 11 | 38 | 44 | −6 | 24 | |
| 9 | Grenchen | 26 | 8 | 7 | 11 | 40 | 49 | −9 | 23 | |
| 10 | Luzern | 26 | 7 | 9 | 10 | 41 | 54 | −13 | 23 | |
| 11 | Chiasso | 26 | 7 | 6 | 13 | 33 | 69 | −36 | 20 | |
| 12 | Sion | 26 | 6 | 7 | 13 | 37 | 69 | −32 | 19 | |
| 13 | Young Fellows Zürich | 26 | 7 | 3 | 16 | 34 | 58 | −24 | 17 | Relegated to Nationalliga B |
| 14 | Lugano | 26 | 4 | 6 | 16 | 21 | 53 | −32 | 14 | Relegated to Nationalliga B |

Source: rsssf.com
(C) Champions

=== Swiss Cup ===
| 3 November 1962 Round 3 | Basel | 4–0 | Black Stars | Basel |
| 14:30 | Weber 4' (1:0); Burri 16' (2:0); Blumer 32' (3:0); Pfirter 36' (4:0) | Summary | | Stadium: Landhof; Attendance: 2.800; Referee: (Switzerland) Zürrer Feldmeilen |

| 2 December 1962 Round 4 | Young Boys | 0–2 | Basel | Bern |
| 14:30 | | Summary | 48' (0:1) Odermatt; 69' (0:2) Pfirter | Stadium: Wankdorf Stadium; Attendance: 10,000; Referee: (Switzerland) Guinnard Gletterens |

| 30 December 1962 Round 5 | Basel | 7–1 | SC Burgdorf | Basel |
| 14:30 | Pfirter 31' (1:0); Weber 60' (2:1); Blumer 67' (3:1); Walther 69' (4:1); Odermatt 70' (5:1); Gatti 80' (6:1); Pfirter 76' (7:1) | Summary | 55' (1:1) Walther | Stadium: Landhof; Attendance: 950; Referee: (Switzerland) Anton Bucheli Luzern |

| 24 February 1963 Quarter-final | Chiasso | 1–2 | Basel | Chiasso |
| | G. Albisett 79' (1:2) | Summary | 16' (0:1) Pfirter; 20' (0:2) Odermatt | Stadium: Stadio Comunale (Chiasso); Attendance: 1.800; Referee: (Switzerland) D. Mellet Lausanne |

| 24 March 1963 Semi-final | Basel | 1–0 | Lausanne-Sports | Basel |
| 15:00 | Markus Pfirter 19' | Summary | | Stadium: St. Jakob Stadium; Attendance: 17,000; Referee: (Switzerland) Othmar Huber Thun |

| 15 April 1963 Final | Basel | 2–0 | Grasshoppers | Bern |
| 15:00 | Heinz Blumer 59' (1:0); Otto Ludwig 67' (2:0) | Summary | | Stadium: Wankdorf Stadium; Attendance: 40,000; Referee: (Switzerland) Mellet (Lausanne) |

=== Inter-Cities Fairs Cup ===
First round

| 16 October 1962 First leg | Basel (Switzerland) | 0–3 | (Germany) Bayern Munich | Basel |
| | | Summary | 41', 70' Brenninger; 86' Drescher | Stadium: St. Jakob Stadium; Attendance: 5,800; Referee: (Luxembourg) Norman Mootz |

Second leg not played and noted without goals as no result. Bayern Munich qualify for second round.

=== Intertoto Cup (IFC) ===
==== Group stage (Group B3) ====
| 27 May 1962 Round 1 | PSV Eindhoven (Netherlands) | 4–3 | (Switzerland) Basel | Eindhoven |
| | Kerkhoffs 40' (1:0); Kerkhoffs 41' (2:0); Svensson 50' (3:0); Kerkhoffs 85' (4:3) | Summary | 60' (3:1) Stöckli; 68' (3:2) Meier; 69' (3:3) Meier | Attendance: 14,000 |

| 3 June 1962 Round 2 | Basel (Switzerland) | 2–2 | (Socialist Federal Republic of Yugoslavia) HNK Rijeka | Landhof, Basel |
| 16:45 | Blumer 28' (1:0); Burri 79' (2:2) | Summary | 63' (1:1) Balent; 73' (1:2) Zadel | Attendance: 4,500; Referee: (Switzerland) Josef Gulde St. Gallen |

| 10 June 1962 Round 3 | Rot-Weiss Oberhausen (West Germany) | 2–2 | (Switzerland) Basel | Niederrheinstadion, Oberhausen |
| | Ha. Siemensmeyer 14' (1:0); K.H. Feldkamp 70' (2:2) | Summary | 45' (1:1) Burri; 56' (1:2) Oberer | Attendance: 3,000; Referee: (Germany) Weingärt |

| 17 June 1962 Round 4 | Basel (Switzerland) | 4–4 | (West Germany) Rot-Weiss Oberhausen | Landhof, Basel |
| 14:30 | Odermatt 23' (1:2); Stöckli 33' (2:2); Ludwig 60' (2:2); Michaud 86' (4:4); Burri (red card) 88' | Summary | 7' (0:1) Sundermann; 12' (0:2) Laszig; 78' (pen. 3:3) Barwenzik; 84' (3:4) K.H.Feldkamp | Attendance: 2,000; Referee: (Switzerland) Othmar Huber Thun |

| 24 June 1962 Round 5 | HNK Rijeka (Socialist Federal Republic of Yugoslavia) | 5–1 | (Switzerland) Basel | Rijeka |
| | Zadel 7' (1:0); Lukaric 18' (2:0); Zadel 21' (3:0); Naumovic 22' (4:0); Medle 81' (5:1) | Summary | 75' (4:1) Ludwig | Attendance: 2,000; Referee: (Socialist Federal Republic of Yugoslavia) Zivko Bajic |

| 1 July 1962 Round 6 | Basel (Switzerland) | 4–3 | (Netherlands) PSV Eindhoven | Landhof, Basel |
| 18:00 | Burri 12' (1:1); Stocker 53' (pen. 2:3); Odermatt 70' (3:3); Pfirter 83' (4:3) | Summary | 11' (0:1) Pys; 14' (1:2) Brussalers; 29' (1:3) Brussalers | Attendance: 2,000; Referee: (Switzerland) Anton Bucheli Luzern |

==== Group B3 table ====
| Pos | Team | Pld | W | D | L | GF | GA | GD | Pts |
|---|---|---|---|---|---|---|---|---|---|
| 1 | (Socialist Federal Republic of Yugoslavia) HNK Rijeka (A) | 6 | 4 | 1 | 1 | 18 | 11 | +7 | 9 |
| 2 | (West Germany) Rot-Weiss Oberhausen | 6 | 3 | 2 | 1 | 15 | 12 | +3 | 8 |
| 3 | (Switzerland) Basel | 6 | 1 | 3 | 2 | 16 | 20 | −4 | 5 |
| 4 | (Netherlands) PSV Eindhoven | 6 | 1 | 0 | 5 | 11 | 17 | −6 | 2 |

Source: FCB archiv
(A) Advanced to quarter-finals

=== Cup of the Alps ===
==== Group stage (Group 2) ====
| 16 June 1963 Round 1 | Basel (Switzerland) | 1–5 | (Italy) Juventus | St. Jakob Stadium, Basel |
| 18:00 | Weber 87' (1:5) | Summary | 14' (0:1) Menighelli; 15' (0:2) Menighelli; 29' (0:3) Dell'Omadarma; 66' (0:4) Miranda; 69' (0:5) Gori | Attendance: 22,000; Referee: (Italy) Francesco Francescon |

| 19 June 1963 Round 2 | Basel (Switzerland) | 1–1 | (Switzerland) Grasshopper Club | Landhof, Basel |
| | Mazzola 42' (1:0) | Summary | 62' (1:1) Wüthrich | Attendance: 1,800; Referee: (Italy) Aurelio Angonese |

| 23 June 1963 Round 3 | Basel (Switzerland) | 1–4 | (Italy) AS Roma | St. Jakob Stadium, Basel |
| 18:00 | Weber (1:4) | Summary | 16' (0:1) Manfredini; 31' (0:2) Angelillo; 61' (0:3) Angelillo; 69' (0:4) Manfredini | Attendance: 9,000; Referee: (Switzerland) D. Mellet Lausanne |

==== Group 2 table ====
| Pos | Team | Pld | W | D | L | GF | GA | GD | Pts | Qualification |
|---|---|---|---|---|---|---|---|---|---|---|
| 1 | (Italy) Juventus | 3 | 3 | 0 | 0 | 12 | 4 | +8 | 6 | Qualified for final |
| 2 | (Italy) AS Roma | 3 | 2 | 0 | 1 | 11 | 4 | +7 | 4 | Qualified for third place match |
| 3 | (Switzerland) Basel | 3 | 0 | 1 | 2 | 3 | 10 | −7 | 1 | |
| 4 | (Switzerland) Grasshopper Club | 3 | 0 | 1 | 2 | 5 | 13 | −8 | 1 | |

Source: rsssf.com

== See also ==
- History of FC Basel
- List of FC Basel players
- List of FC Basel seasons

== Sources ==
- Rotblau: Jahrbuch Saison 2014/2015. Publisher: FC Basel Marketing AG. ISBN 978-3-7245-2027-6
- Die ersten 125 Jahre. Publisher: Josef Zindel im Friedrich Reinhardt Verlag, Basel. ISBN 978-3-7245-2305-5
- The FCB team 1962–63 at fcb-archiv.ch
- Switzerland 1962–63 by Erik Garin at Rec.Sport.Soccer Statistics Foundation
