= Enrico Mazzola =

Italian footballer (born 1944)

Personal information
- Full name: Enrico Mazzola
- Date of birth: 7 April 1944 (age 82)
- Positions: Midfielder; forward

Senior career*
| Years | Team | Apps | (Gls) |
| 1962–1966 | FC Basel | 17 | (3) |
| 1966– | FC Breite | | |
- * Club domestic league appearances and goals

Enrico Mazzola (born 7 April 1944) was an Italian footballer who played for FC Basel. He played mainly as a forward, but also as a midfielder. He won the Swiss Cup with Basel in the 1962–63 season. Between 1963 and 1966, he played 41 games for the club and scored eight goals.

== Football career ==
Mazzola joined Basel's first team during their 1962–63 season under manager Jiří Sobotka. On 15 April 1963 the Wankdorf Stadium hosted the Cup Final and Basel played against favorites Grasshopper Club. Two goals after half time, one by Heinz Blumer and the second from Otto Ludwig gave Basel a 2–0 victory and their third Cup win in their history. Mazzola made his league debut in the home game against Biel-Bienne in the Landhof on 19 May as Basel won 3–2.

A well-documented curiosity was the fact that during the winter break of their 1963–64 season the team travelled on a world tour. This saw them visit British Hong Kong, Malaysia, Singapore, Australia, New Zealand, French Polynesia, Mexico and the United States. First team manager Jiří Sobotka together with 16 players and 15 members of staff, supporters and journalists participated in this world tour from 10 January to 10 February 1964. Team captain Bruno Michaud filmed the events with his super-8 camara. The voyage around the world included 19 flights and numerous bus and train journeys. Club chairman, Lucien Schmidlin, led the group, but as they arrived in the hotel in Bangkok, he realised that 250,000 Swiss Francs were missing. The suitcase that he had filled with the various currencies was not with them. He had left it at home, but Swiss Air were able to deliver this to him within a few days. During the tour a total of ten friendly/test games were played, these are listed in their 1963–64 season. Five wins, three draws, two defeats, but also three major injuries resulted from these test matches. A broken leg for Peter Füri, an eye injury for Walter Baumann and a knee injury for Bruno Michaud soon reduced the number of players to just 13. Mazzola was a member of this tour. He played in seven of these games.

Between 1963 and 1966 Mazzola played 41 games for Basel and scored eight goals; 17 games were in the Swiss Serie A, 2 in the Swiss Cup, 4 were on European level and 18 were friendly games. He scored three goal in the domestic league, one in the Cup of the Alps and the other four during the test games.

== Honours and Titles ==
Basel

- Swiss Cup winner: 1962–63

== Sources ==
- Rotblau: Jahrbuch Saison 2017/2018. Publisher: FC Basel Marketing AG. ISBN 978-3-7245-2189-1
- Die ersten 125 Jahre. Publisher: Josef Zindel im Friedrich Reinhardt Verlag, Basel. ISBN 978-3-7245-2305-5
- Verein "Basler Fussballarchiv" Homepage
- A list of Swiss Cup Finals at RSSSF
