= 1963–64 FC Basel season =

FC Basel
1963–64 season
- Chairman: Lucien Schmidlin
- Manager: Jiří Sobotka
- Ground: Landhof and St. Jakob Stadium, Basel
- Nationalliga A: 7th
- Swiss Cup: Round of 16
- European Cup Winners' Cup: First round
- Cup of the Alps: Group stage
- Top goalscorer: League: Karl Odermatt (9); All: Karl Odermatt (11)
- Highest home attendance: 11,000 12.04.1964 vs. Lausanne-Sport
- Lowest home attendance: 5,000 26.04.1964 vs. Cantonal Neuchatel
- Average home league attendance: 7,150

The 1963–64 season was Fussball Club Basel 1893's 70th season in their existence. It was their 18th consecutive season in the top flight of Swiss football after their promotion in the 1945–46 season. They played their home games either in their old Landhof Stadium or in their new St. Jakob Stadium. Lucien Schmidlin was club chairman for the second year running.

== Overview ==
=== Pre-season ===
Jiří Sobotka continued his job as club manager, it was his third consecutive year as manager. Basel played a total of 55 games this season. Of these 26 were in the domestic league, three were in the Swiss Cup, two in the 1963–64 European Cup Winners' Cup, three in the Cup of the Alps and 21 were friendly matches. Of these 21 test games 12 were won, five drawn and four were lost. Roberto Frigerio scored 19 goals in 15 test games. Four alone in the game against FC Laufen and a hat-trick against Lugano.

However, the results of these test games are secondary. The pre-seasons tests were mainly played with lower level, locals teams as release games for the transfers of young players, Marcel Kunz from FC Gerlafingen, Walter Baumann from FC Pratteln and Walter Löffel from FC Moutier.

=== World tour ===
A well-documented curiosity was the fact that during the winter break of the 1963–64 season the team travelled on a world tour. This saw them visit British Hong Kong, Malaysia, Singapore, Australia, New Zealand, French Polynesia, Mexico and the United States. First team manager Jiří Sobotka together with 16 players and 15 members of staff, supporters and journalists participated in this world tour from 10 January to 10 February 1964. Team captain Bruno Michaud filmed the events with his super-8 camara. The voyage around the world included 19 flights and numerous bus and train journeys. Club chairman, Lucien Schmidlin, led the group, but as they arrived in the hotel in Bangkok, he realised that 250,000 Swiss Francs were missing. The suitcase that he had filled with the various currencies was not with them. He had left it at home, but Swiss Air were able to deliver this to him within a few days. During the tour a total of ten friendly/test games were played, these are listed below. Five wins, three draws, two defeats, but also three major injuries resulted from these test matches. A broken leg for Peter Füri, an eye injury for Walter Baumann and a knee injury for Bruno Michaud soon reduced the number of players to just 13.

=== Domestic league ===
There were fourteen teams contesting in the 1963–64 Nationalliga A, these were the top 12 teams from the previous season 1962–63 and the two newly promoted teams Schaffhausen and Cantonal Neuchatel. The Championship was played in a double round-robin, the champions were to be qualified for 1964–65 European Cup and the bottom placed two teams in the table were to be relegated. Basel started well into the season, winning four of the first five matches. Despite three away defeats, up until the winter break the team were championship leaders with seven wins and three draws. The second half of the season, following the world tour, started with three straight defeats. Basel consequently slipped down in the league table and finished the championship in seventh position, with ten wins and six draws from 26 matches, scoring 42 goals conceding 48, with twenty six points, 13 points less than the new champions La Chaux-de-Fonds. Karl Odermatt was the team's top goal scorer in the domestic league with 9 goals.

=== Swiss Cup ===
As title holders in the Swiss Cup, Basel started in the 3rd principal round, on 5 October 1963, with an easy away win against SC Schöftland in their attempt to defend this title. In the round of 32 they played away from home against local rivals Concordia which was also won with ease. In the round of 16 Basel were drawn against lower classed Porrentruy. However, this was indeed the best period in the Porrentruy club history. Their player-manager at that time was Basel's former striker Hügi (II) and game ended with a surprising 0–1 defeat, goal scorer in the 56 minute was another former Basel player René Jaeck. Basel's cup campaign came to an abrupt and disappointing end. But Porrentruy, with a quarter-final win over Sion, even advanced as far as the semi-finals. Here they were beaten by the new cup winners Lausanne-Sport.

=== European Cup Winners' Cup ===
As Swiss Cup holders Basel were qualified for the 1963–64 European Cup Winners' Cup competition. Here they were drawn against the Scottish cup holders Celtic. Both games ended very disappointingly (1–5 and 0–5) and thus ended with a disastrous aggregate result.

=== Cup of the Alps ===
In the Cup of the Alps competition during the group stage Basel played against Genoa C.F.C., Atalanta and Zürich. All three games were played in the Landhof, but all three ended in a defeat and the campaign ended.

== Players ==
Note: Flags indicate national team as defined under FIFA eligibility rules; some limited exceptions apply. Players may hold more than one non-FIFA nationality.

No.	Pos.	Nation	Player
—	GK	SUI	Hansruedi Günthardt
—	GK	SUI	Marcel Kunz (from FC Gerlafingen)
—	GK	SUI	Kurt Stettler
—	DF	SUI	Walter Baumann (from FC Pratteln)
—	DF	SUI	Heinz Blumer
—	DF	SUI	René Burri
—	DF	SUI	Peter Füri
—	MF	GER	Josef Kiefer
—	DF	SUI	Bruno Michaud
—	DF	SUI	Markus Pfirter
—	DF	SUI	Hanspeter Stocker
—	MF	SUI	Hans Weber
—	MF	SUI	Werner Decker (only Cup of the Alps)

No.	Pos.	Nation	Player
—	MF	SUI	Walter Löffel (from FC Moutier)
—	FW	ITA	Enrico Mazzola
—	FW	SUI	Aldo Moscatelli (only Cup of the Alps)
—	MF	SUI	Karl Odermatt
—	FW	SUI	Roberto Frigerio
—	FW	SUI	Bruno Gabrieli (from Nordstern Basel)
—	FW	SUI	Bruno Gatti
—	FW	SUI	Arnold Hofer
—	FW	HUN	Janos Konrad (from reserve team)
—	FW	SUI	Klaus Huber (from SpVgg Rheinfelden)
—	FW	GER	Erdmann Lüth (from VfR Kaiserslautern)
—	MF	SUI	Carlo Porlezza
—	FW	SUI	Raymond Simonet
—	MF	SUI	Fernando Von Krannichfeldt

Players who left the squad

Note: Flags indicate national team as defined under FIFA eligibility rules; some limited exceptions apply. Players may hold more than one non-FIFA nationality.

No.	Pos.	Nation	Player
—	GK	SUI	René Jeker (to Winterthur)
—	MF	SUI	Abraham Levy

No.	Pos.	Nation	Player
—	FW	SUI	Werner Meier
—	FW	SUI	Niklaus Stöckli (reserve team)
—	MF	SUI	Wolfgang Walther

== Results ==
Legend

Win Draw Loss Postponed

=== Friendly matches ===
==== Pre-season ====
1 August 1963 Pre-season	Black Stars (Switzerland)	1–8	(Switzerland) Basel	Buschwilerhof, Basel
17:00	Hänggi	Summary	(2) Mazzola (4) Pfirter; Hofer; Löffel	Attendance: 1,500; Referee: (Switzerland) Wyttenbach Birsfelden

7 August 1963 Pre-season	FC Pratteln (Switzerland)	1–5	(Switzerland) Basel	In den Sandgruben, Pratteln
	(1:4)	Summary	20' (0:1) Mazzola; 22' (0:2) Hofer; 43' (0:3) Hofer; 50' (0:4) Gatti (1:5) Burri	Attendance: 600; Referee: (Switzerland) Gottfried Dienst Basel
Note: Release game for transfer of Walter Baumann

10 August 1963 Pre-season	FC Gerlafingen (Switzerland)	1–4	(Switzerland) Basel	Strackbach, Gerlafingen
16:00	Müller 44' (1:3)	Summary	2' (0:1) Lüth; 30' (0:2) Simonet; 34' (0:3) Lüth; 48' (1:4) Mazzola	Attendance: 800; Referee: (Switzerland) Rudolf Scheurer Bettlach
Note: Release game for transfer of goalkeeper Marcel Kunz

11 August 1963 Pre-season	FC Moutier (Switzerland)	1–3	(Switzerland) Basel	Stade de Chalière, Moutier
	Spielmann 44' (1:0)	Summary	50' (1:1) Pfirter; 74' (1:2) Gatti; 89' (1:3) Gatti	Attendance: 800; Referee: (Switzerland) Rudolf Scheurer Bettlach
Note: Release game for transfer of Walter Löffel

14 August 1963 Pre-season	Basel (Switzerland)	3–2	(Denmark) Kjøbenhavns Boldklub	St. Jakob Stadium, Basel
20:00	Gatti 14' (1:0); Blumer 20' (2:0); Pfirter 33' (3:0)	Summary	60' (3:1) Kristensen; 87' (3:2) Möller	Attendance: 2,000; Referee: (Switzerland) Karl Göppel Zürich

18 August 1963 Pre-season	La Chaux-de-Fonds (Switzerland)	2–2	(Switzerland) Basel	Stade des Prés-sous-Ville, Vallorbe
	Bertschi 52' (1:1); Vuilleumier 83' (2:2)	Summary	8' (0:1) Blumer; 75' (1:2) Odermatt	Attendance: 1,500; Referee: (Switzerland) D. Mellet Lausanne

==== Winter break and mid-season ====
15 January 1964 Winter break	Hong Kong	2–3	(Switzerland) Basel	Hong Kong Stadium, British Hong Kong
20:00	(1:2) (2:3)	Summary	14' (0:1) Blumer; 16' (0:2) Gatti; 41' (1:3) Frigerio	Attendance: 8,000; Referee: Luk-tak-son

18 January 1964 Winter break	Malaysia	2–5	(Switzerland) Basel	Stadium Merdeka, Kuala Lumpur Malaysia
20:00	Jusof Hamid 61' (1:4); Jusof Hamid 75' (2:5)	Summary	8' (0:1) Odermatt; 17' (0:2) Frigerio; 32' (0:3) Odermatt; 60' (0:4) Pfirter; 69' (1:5) Blumer	Attendance: 6,000

20 January 1964 Winter break	Singapore Selection	2–2	(Switzerland) Basel	Jalan Besar Stadium, Kallang, Singapore
	5' (1:1); 7' (pen. 2:1)	Summary	3' (0:1) Blumer; 61' (2:2) Frigerio	Attendance: 5,000

22 January 1964 Winter break	Singapore Selection	2–4	(Switzerland) Basel	Jalan Besar Stadium, Kallang, Singapore
	55' (1:3); 90' (2:4)	Summary	19' (0:1) Frigerio; 29' (0:2) Frigerio; 50' (0:3) Burri; 75' (1:4)Frigerio	Attendance: 4,000

25 January 1964 Winter break	Sydney Prague (Australia)	2–2	(Switzerland) Basel	Athletic Field, Sydney, Australia
	Tristram (1:0); Tristram 40' (2:0)	Summary	68' (2:1) Frigerio; 72' (2:2) Odermatt	Attendance: 12,000

26 January 1964 Winter break	Victoria Selection (Australia)	3–2	(Switzerland) Basel	Olympic Park Stadium, Melbourne, Victoria, Australia
	Joreski 4' (1:0); Stankovic 50' (2:1); Stankovic 89' (3:2)	Summary	25' (1:1) Blumer; 65' (2:2) Frigerio	Attendance: 20,000

27 January 1964 Winter break	New Zealand	1–4	(Switzerland) Basel	Blandford Park, Auckland, New Zealand
20:00	Moore 78' (1:4)	Summary	18' (0:1) Frigerio (0:2) Odermatt; 55' (0:3) Blumer; 60' (0:4) Frigerio	Attendance: 6,500

1 February 1964 Winter break	Tahiti Selection (French Polynesia)	0–0	(Switzerland) Basel	Papeete, French Polynesia
		Summary		Attendance: 4,500; Referee: (Switzerland) Paul Wyssling Zürich

4 February 1964 Winter break	California All Stars (Mexico)	1–2	(Switzerland) Basel	Tijuana, Mexico
20:30	67' (1:2)	Summary	21' (0:1) Burri; 60' (0:2) Löffel	Attendance: 2,200

9 February 1964 Winter break	Los Angeles All Stars (United States)	2–1	(Switzerland) Basel	Wrigley Field, Los Angeles
	Radulski 4' (1:0); Abaunze 15' (2:0)	Summary	73' (2:1) Frigerio

22 February 1964 Winter break	Lugano (Switzerland)	5–4	(Switzerland) Basel	Cornaredo, Lugano
	Mungai 13' (1:0); Simonetti 17' (2:0); Zaro 26' (3:1); Colombo 44' (4:2); Simonetti 47' (5:2)	Summary	25' (o.g. 2:1) Scalena; 28' (2:2) Frigerio; 49' (5:3) Frigerio; 85' (5:4) Frigerio	Attendance: 500; Referee: (Switzerland) Luigi Grassi Novazzano

1 March 1964 Winter break	Basel (Switzerland)	12 – 0	(Switzerland) Laufen	Basel
	Blumer (1); Frigerio (4); Odermatt (4); Weber (3)	Summary

14 April 1964 Mid-season	Basel (Switzerland)	5–5	(West Germany) Schalke 04	St. Jakob Stadium, Basel
20:15	Meier 40' (1:2); Keller 63' (2:3); Meier 69' (3:3); Meier 77' (4:5); Meier 88' (5:5)	Summary	5' (0:1) Klose; 28' (0:2) Matischak; 57' (1:3) Klose; 74' (3:4) Bechmann; 75' (3:5) Matischak	Attendance: 7,000; Referee: (Switzerland) Karl Göppel Zürich
Note: Basel strengthened through Boskov Young Fellows Zürich and Eugen Meier Young Boys

6 May 1964 Mid-season	Basel (Switzerland)	0–6	(England) Nottingham Forest	Landhof, Basel
18:00		Summary	36' (0:1) Wignall; 44' (0:2) Newton; 46' (0:3) Addison; 67' (0:4) Newton; 82' (o.g.); 84' (0:3) Wignall	Attendance: 3,000; Referee: (Switzerland) Pius Kamber Zürich

18 May 1964 Mid-season	FC Brunnen (Switzerland)	2–7	(Switzerland) Basel	Brunnen
15:00	Goal	Summary	(2) Frigerio (1) Gatti (3) Odermatt (1) Stocker

=== Nationalliga A ===
==== League matches ====
25 August 1963 Round 1	Zürich	0–2	Basel	Letzigrund, Zürich
15:15		Summary	5' (0:1) Simonet; 70' (0:2) Blumer	Attendance: 10,000; Referee: (Switzerland) Anton Bucheli Luzern

1 September 1963 Round 2	Basel	2–0	Sion	Landhof, Basel
15:00	Pfirter 54' (1:0); Pfirter 74' (2:0)	Summary		Attendance: 5,800; Referee: (Switzerland) Othmar Huber Thun

8 September 1963 Round 3	Grenchen	0–1	Basel	Stadion Brühl, Grenchen
15:00		Summary	79' (0:1) Füri	Referee: (Switzerland) Zürrer Feldmeilen

14 September 1963 Round 4	Basel	2–2	Schaffhausen	Landhof, Basel
16:00	Blumer 33' (1:1); Blumer 89' (2:2)	Summary	32' (0:1) Wiehler; 35' (1:2) Wiehler	Attendance: 6,500; Referee: (Switzerland) Pius Kamber Zürich

22 September 1966 Round 5	Lausanne-Sport	2–3	Basel	Olympique de la Pontaise, Lausanne
15:00	Hosp 19' (1:0); Schneiter 58' (2:2); Hertig (yellow card) 85'	Summary	52' (1:1) Blumer; 55' (1:2) Blumer; 75' (2:3) Hofer	Attendance: 12,000; Referee: (Switzerland) W. Hardmeier Thalwil

29 September 1963 Round 6	Basel	2–2	Chiasso	Landhof, Basel
15:00	Hofer 43' (1:1); Hofer 88' (2:2)	[ Summary]	3' (0:1) Bergna; 47' (1:2) Bergna	Attendance: 6,800; Referee: (Switzerland) GuinnardGletterens

13 October 1963 Round 7	Cantonal Neuchatel	2–1	Basel	Stade de la Maladière (1924), Neuchâtel
15:00	Perroud 10' (1:1); Ballamann 56' (2:1)	Summary	7' (0:1) Mazzola	Attendance: 4,500; Referee: (Switzerland) Karl Göppel Zürich

27 October 1963 Round 8	Basel	2–1	Grasshopper Club	Landhof, Basel
15:00	Gatti 65' (1:1); Baumann 74' (2:1)	Summary	33' (0:1) Czibor	Attendance: 9,200; Referee: (Switzerland) Othmar Huber Thun

6 November 1963 Round 9	Young Boys	2–1	Basel	Wankdorf Stadium, Bern
	Füllemann 32' (1:0); Buffoni 58' (2:1)	Summary	44' (1:1) Pfirter	Attendance: 7,000; Referee: (Switzerland) D. Mellet Lausanne

17 November 1963 Round 10	Basel	4–0	Biel-Bienne	Landhof, Basel
14:30	Gatti 11' (1:0); Lüth 20' (2:0); Baumann 47' (3:0); Odermatt 80' (4:0)	Summary		Attendance: 7.300; Referee: (Switzerland) F. Schorer Interlaken

1 December 1963 Round 11	Basel	3–0	Luzern	Landhof, Basel
14:30	Odermatt 23' (1:0); Odermatt 37' (2:0); Odermatt 75' (3:0)	Summary		Attendance: 5,800; Referee: (Switzerland) Strässle Steinach

8 December 1963 Round 12	Servette	4–1	Basel	Charmilles Stadium, Geneva
	Desbiolle 1' (1:0); Bosson 16' (2:0); Schindelholz 52' (3:1); Desbiolle 85' (4:1)	Summary	24' (2:1) Odermatt	Attendance: 12,500; Referee: (Switzerland) Albert Weber Lausanne

15 December 1963 Round 13	Basel	2–2	La Chaux-de-Fonds	St. Jakob Stadium, Basel
14:30	Weber 58' (1:2); Mazzola 83' (2:2)	Summary	23' (0:1) Trivellin; Skiba 38' (0:2)	Attendance: 7,000; Referee: (Switzerland)

8 March 1964 Round 14	Basel	0–5	Zürich	St. Jakob Stadium, Basel
15:00		Summary	15' (0:1) Stürmer; 23' (0:2) Rüfl; 30' (0:3) Stürmer; 44' (0:4) Brizzi; 88' (0:5) Frey	Attendance: 9,000; Referee: (Switzerland) Othmar Huber Thun

15 March 1964 Round 15	Sion	2–0	Basel	Parc des Sports, Sion
	Mantula 24' (1:0); Gasser 56' (2:0)	Summary		Attendance: 2,000; Referee: (Switzerland) Guinnard Gletterens

22 March 1964 Round 16	Basel	0–2	Grenchen	Landhof, Basel
15:00		Summary	3' (0:1) Kominek} 61' (0:2) H. Schneider	Attendance: 7,500; Referee: (Switzerland) Karl Göppel Zürich

5 April 1964 Round 17	Schaffhausen	1–1	Basel	Stadion Breite, Schaffhausen
15:00	Flury 51' (1:1)	Summary	13' (0:1) Frigerio	Attendance: 2,700; Referee: (Switzerland) Strässle Steinach

12 April 1964 Round 18	Basel	4–2	Lausanne-Sport	Landhof, Basel
15:00	Frigerio 8' (1:0); Frigerio 15' (2:1); Gatti 75' (3:1); Mazzola 79' (4:1)	Summary	11' (pen. 1:1) Eschmann; 84' (4:2) Hosp	Attendance: 11,000; Referee: (Switzerland) Anton Bucheli Luzern

19 April 1964 Round 19	Chiasso	0–0	Basel	Stadio Via Comacini, Chiasso
		Summary		Attendance: 1,500; Referee: (Switzerland) Gilbert Droz Marin-Epagnier

26 April 1964 Round 20	Basel	3–2	Cantonal Neuchatel	Landhof, Basel
15:00	Löffel 11' (1:1); Odermatt 65' (2:2); Weber 75' (3:2)	Summary	8' (0:1) Sandoz; 34' (1:2) Maffioli	Attendance: 4,000; Referee: (Switzerland) Zürrer Feldmeilen

3 May 1964 Round 21	Grasshopper Club	3–2	Basel	Hardturm, Zürich
15:15	Menet 16' (pen. 1:1); Bernasconi 25' (2:1); Bernasconi 37' (3:1)	Summary	6' (0:1) Odermatt; 45' (3:2) Gatti	Attendance: 3,000; Referee: (Switzerland) Roland Keller Bern

16 May 1964 Round 22	Basel	2–1	Young Boys	Landhof, Basel
18:00	Frigerio 70' (1:1); Odermatt 86' (2:1)	Summary	51' (0:1) Grünig	Attendance: 5,500; Referee: (Switzerland) Pius Kamber Zürich

24 May 1964 Round 23	Biel-Bienne	2–2	Basel	Gurzelen Stadion, Biel/Bienne
	Graf 50' (1:1); Rajkov 80' (2:2)	Summary	23' (0:1) Odermatt; 75' (pen. 1:2) Stocker	Attendance: 3,500; Referee: (Switzerland) Guinnard Gletterens

31 May 1964 Round 24	Luzern	3–2	Basel	Stadion Allmend, Luzern
	Wähling 57' (1:2); Meili 58' (2:2); Meili 76' (3:2)	Summary	30' (0:1) Frigerio; 53' (pen. 0:2)	Attendance: 2,600; Referee: (Switzerland) Rudolf Scheurer Bettlach

7 June 1964 Round 25	Basel	0–6	Servette	St. Jakob Stadium Landhof, Basel
15:00		Summary	35' (0:1) Schindelholz; 43' (0:2) Desbiolles; 67' (0:3) Schindelholz; 68' (0:4) Nemeth; 84' (0:5) Vonlanthen; 85' (0:6) Schindelholz	Attendance: 6,500; Referee: (Switzerland) D. Mellet Lausanne

14 June 1964 Round 26	La Chaux-de-Fonds	2–0	Basel	Stade Charrière, La Chaux-de-Fonds
15:00	Skiba 30' (1:0); Bertschi 87' (2:0)	Summary		Attendance: 7,400; Referee: (Switzerland) Anton Bucheli Luzern

==== League standings ====
Pos	Team	Pld	W	D	L	GF	GA	GD	Pts	Qualification
1	La Chaux-de-Fonds (C)	26	17	5	4	68	36	+32	39	Swiss champions, qualified for 1964–65 European Cup and entered 1964–65 Intertoto Cup
2	Zürich	26	18	2	6	84	37	+47	38	
3	Grenchen	26	17	4	5	57	35	+22	38	Entered 1964–65 Intertoto Cup
4	Servette	26	18	0	8	74	33	+41	36	
5	Lausanne-Sport	26	13	4	9	61	52	+9	30	Swiss Cup winners, qualified for 1964–65 European Cup Winners' Cup and entered 1964–65 Intertoto Cup
6	Young Boys	26	11	5	10	56	54	+2	27	Entered 1964–65 Intertoto Cup
7	Basel	26	10	6	10	42	48	−6	26	
8	Luzern	26	10	3	13	44	52	−8	23	
9	Chiasso	26	8	7	11	40	54	−14	23	
10	Sion	26	9	3	14	52	58	−6	21	
11	Grasshopper Club	26	8	3	15	42	64	−22	19	
12	Biel-Bienne	26	8	2	16	52	68	−16	18	
13	Schaffhausen	26	3	7	16	32	69	−37	13	Relegated: to Nationalliga B
14	Cantonal Neuchatel	26	4	5	17	38	82	−44	13	Relegated: to Nationalliga B

Source: rsssf.com
(C) Champions

=== Swiss Cup ===
6 October 1963 Round of 64	SC Schöftland	0–7	Basel	Schöftland
		Summary	2' (0:1) Hofer; 32' (0:2) Odermatt; 39' (0:3) Weber; 55' (0:4) Hofer; 58' (0:5) Blumer; 75' (0:6) Lüth; 81' (0:7) Lüth	Stadium: Sportanlage Rütimatten; Attendance: 1,800; Referee: (Switzerland) Ullrich Dübendorf

20 October 1963 Round of 32	Concordia	0–4	Basel	Basel
15:00		Summary	17' (0:1) Blumer; 20' (0:2) Baumann; 71' (0:3) Weber; 75' (0:4) Pfirter	Stadium: St. Jakob Stadium; Attendance: 4,500; Referee: (Switzerland) F. Schorer Interlaken

24 November 1963 Round of 16	Porrentruy	1–0	Basel	Porrentruy
	Jaeck 56' (1:0)	Summary		Stadium: Stade du Tirage; Attendance: 5'600; Referee: (Switzerland) Michael Huber

=== European Cup Winners' Cup ===
17 September 1963 First leg	FC Basel (Switzerland)	1–5	(Scotland) Celtic	St. Jakob Stadium, Basel
19:45	Blumer 78'	Summary	21' Divers; 43', 65', 77' Hughes; 53' Lennox	Attendance: 15,500; Referee: (Spain) Manuel Gómez Arribas

9 October 1963 Second leg	Celtic (Scotland)	5–0	(Switzerland) FC Basel	Celtic Park, Glasgow
19:30	Johnstone 3'; Divers 42', 88'; Murdoch 62'; Chalmers 78'	Summary		Attendance: 7,909; Referee: (Denmark) Frede Hansen

Celtic won 10 – 1 on aggregate.

=== Cup of the Alps ===
==== Group stage ====
21 June 1964 Round 1	Basel (Switzerland)	2–5	(Italy) Genoa C.F.C.	Landhof, Basel
18:30	Odermatt 49' (1:1); Moscatelli 76' (2:3)	Summary	39' (0:1) Rivara; 64' (1:2) Bean; 69' (1:3) Bean; 77' (2:4) Bean; 89' (2:5) Locatelli	Attendance: 7,500; Referee: (Italy) Alessandro D'Agostini

24 June 1964 Round 2	Basel (Switzerland)	3–4	(Switzerland) Zürich	Landhof, Basel
18:30	Frigerio 1' (1:0); Frigerio 39' (2:2); Frigerio 68' (3:2)	Summary	13' (1:1) Martinelli; 39' (1:2) Martinelli; 77' (3:3) Martinelli; 84' (3:4) Stürmer	Attendance: 3,000; Referee: (Italy) Gambarotto

27 June 1964 Round 3	Basel (Switzerland)	0–3	(Italy) Atalanta	Landhof, Basel
18:15		Summary	52' (0:1) Christensen; 60' (0:2) Magistrelli; 75' (0:3) Meneghetti	Attendance: 6,000; Referee: (Switzerland) Othmar Huber Thun

==== Group 1 table ====
Pos	Team	Pld	W	D	L	GF	GA	GD	Pts	Qualification
1	(Italy) Genoa C.F.C.	3	3	0	0	7	2	+5	6	Qualified for final
2	(Switzerland) Zürich	3	2	0	1	6	5	+1	4	Qualified for third place match
3	(Italy) Atalanta	3	1	0	2	4	3	+1	2	
4	(Switzerland) Basel	3	0	0	3	5	12	−7	0	

Source: rsssf.com

== See also ==
- History of FC Basel
- List of FC Basel players
- List of FC Basel seasons

== Sources ==
- Rotblau: Jahrbuch Saison 2014/2015. Publisher: FC Basel Marketing AG. ISBN 978-3-7245-2027-6
- Die ersten 125 Jahre. Publisher: Josef Zindel im Friedrich Reinhardt Verlag, Basel. ISBN 978-3-7245-2305-5
- FCB team 1963–64 at fcb-archiv.ch
- Switzerland 1963–64 at RSSSF
