= Carlo Porlezza =

Swiss footballer (born 1939)

Personal information
- Full name: Carlo Porlezza
- Date of birth: 17 December 1939 (age 86)
- Place of birth: Basel, Switzerland
- Position: Defender

Youth career
- until 1960: FC Basel

Senior career*
Years	Team	Apps	(Gls)
1960–1966	FC Basel	83	(0)
- * Club domestic league appearances and goals

Carlo Porlezza (born 17 December 1939) is a Swiss former football player who played as defender during the early 1960s.

== Football career ==
Porlezza was born and brought up in Basel and started his football with the youth teams of FC Basel. For their 1960–61 season he advanced to their first team under manager Jenő Vincze. He played his domestic league debut for the club in the away game on 4 December 1960 as Basel were beaten 0–2 by Zürich.

In Basel's 1962–63 season, with trainer Jiří Sobotka, Porlezza was part of the Swiss Cup winning team. On 15 April 1963 the Wankdorf Stadium hosted the Cup Final and Basel played against favorites Grasshopper Club. Two goals after half time, one by Heinz Blumer and the second from Otto Ludwig gave Basel a 2–0 victory and their third Cup win in the club's history.

He stayed with the first team for five seasons and then returned to their reserve team. Between the years 1960 and 1966 Porlezza played a total of 156 games for Basel without scoring a goal. 83 of these games were in the Nationalliga A, 13 in the Swiss Cup, 21 in European competitions (European Cup Winners' Cup, Cup of the Alps, Inter-Cities Fairs Cup and UEFA Intertoto Cup and 39 were friendly games.

=== Curiosity ===
A well-documented curiosity was that during the winter break of their 1963–64 season the team travelled on a world tour. This saw them visit British Hong Kong, Malaysia, Singapore, Australia, New Zealand, French Polynesia, Mexico and the United States. First team manager Jiří Sobotka together with 16 players and 15 members of staff, supporters and journalists participated in this world tour from 10 January to 10 February 1964. Team captain Bruno Michaud filmed the events with his super-8 camara. The voyage around the world included 19 flights and numerous bus and train journeys. Club chairman, Lucien Schmidlin, led the group, but as they arrived in the hotel in Bangkok, he realised that 250,000 Swiss Francs were missing. The suitcase that he had filled with the various currencies was not with them. He had left it at home, but fortunately Swiss Air were able to deliver this to him within just a few days.

During the tour a total of ten friendly/test games were played, these are listed in their 1963–64 season. Five wins, three draws, two defeats, but also three major injuries resulted from these test matches. A broken leg for Peter Füri, an eye injury for Walter Baumann and a knee injury for Bruno Michaud soon reduced the number of players to just 13.Porlezza was a member of this tour. He played in all ten of these games.

== Honours and Titles ==
Basel

- Swiss Cup winner: 1963

== Sources ==
- Rotblau: Jahrbuch Saison 2017/2018. Publisher: FC Basel Marketing AG. ISBN 978-3-7245-2189-1
- Die ersten 125 Jahre. Publisher: Josef Zindel im Friedrich Reinhardt Verlag, Basel. ISBN 978-3-7245-2305-5
- Verein "Basler Fussballarchiv" Homepage
