= René Burri (footballer) =

Swiss footballer (born 1941)

Personal information
- Full name: René Burri
- Date of birth: 7 July 1941
- Position: Defender

Senior career*
Years	Team	Apps	(Gls)
1960–1961	FC Birsfelden		
1961–1964	FC Basel	35	(3)
1964–1967	Cantonal Neuchatel		
1967–1969	La Chaux-de-Fonds	37	(2)
- * Club domestic league appearances and goals

René Burri (born 7 July 1941) is a Swiss former footballer who played in the 1960s. He played as a defender.

Burri first played for local team FC Birsfelden in the fourth tier of Swiss football. He joined FC Basel's first team for their 1961–62 season under manager Jiří Sobotka. Burri played his first game for his new club in the 1961–62 International Football Cup game away against Sparta Rotterdam. In this game he also scored his first goal for Basel, but this could not save the team from a 2–5 defeat. He played his domestic league debut for the club in the home game at the Landhof on 16 September as Basel were defeated 1–2 by Luzern. He scored his first league goal for his club on 4 March 1962 in the home game as Basel won 4–3 against Fribourg.

In their 1962–63 season Basel won the Swiss Cup as they beat the favourites Grasshopper Club Zürich in the Final. In the Wankdorf Stadium on 15 April 1963 Heinz Blumer and Otto Ludwig scored the goals as Basel won 2–0.

A well-documented curiosity was that during the winter break of their 1963–64 season the team travelled on a world tour. This saw them visit British Hong Kong, Malaysia, Singapore, Australia, New Zealand, French Polynesia, Mexico and the United States. First team manager Jiří Sobotka together with 16 players and 15 members of staff, supporters and journalists participated in this world tour from 10 January to 10 February 1964. Team captain Bruno Michaud filmed the events with his super-8 camara. The voyage around the world included 19 flights and numerous bus and train journeys. Club chairman, Lucien Schmidlin, led the group, but as they arrived in the hotel in Bangkok, he realised that 250,000 Swiss Francs were missing. The suitcase that he had filled with the various currencies was not with them. He had left it at home, but fortunately Swiss Air were able to deliver this to him within just a few days. During the tour a total of ten friendly/test games were played, these are listed in their 1963–64 season. Five wins, three draws, two defeats, but also three major injuries resulted from these test matches. A broken leg for Peter Füri, an eye injury for Walter Baumann and a knee injury for Bruno Michaud soon reduced the number of players to just 13. Burri was a member of this tour. He played in eight of the games and scored two goals.

Burri stayed with Basel for three seasons. Between the years 1961 and 1964 Burri played a total of 67 games for Basel scoring a total of 13 goals. 35 of these games were in the Nationalliga A, three in the Swiss Cup, one in the Cup of the Alps, one in the UEFA Cup Winners' Cup, five in the International Football Cup and 22 were friendly games. He scored three goals in the domestic league, one in the Swiss Cup, four in the International Football Cup and the other five were scored during the test games.

After his time with Basel, Burri moved on to play three seasons with Cantonal Neuchatel and then two seasons with La Chaux-de-Fonds.

== Sources ==
- Die ersten 125 Jahre. Publisher: Josef Zindel im Friedrich Reinhardt Verlag, Basel. ISBN 978-3-7245-2305-5
- Verein "Basler Fussballarchiv" Homepage
