= Hanspeter Stocker =

Swiss footballer (born 1936)

Personal information
- Full name: Hanspeter Stocker
- Date of birth: 23 November 1936 (age 89)
- Place of birth: Basel Switzerland
- Position: Defender

Senior career*
Years	Team	Apps	(Gls)
until 1960	FC Concordia Basel		
1960–1968	FC Basel	171	(28)
1968–1969	FC Baden	20	(0)
1969–	SC Binningen		

International career
1966–1967	Switzerland	1	(0)
- * Club domestic league appearances and goals

Hanspeter Stocker (* 23 November 1936) is a retired Swiss footballer who played for FC Basel. He played during the 1960s mainly in the position as defender.

== Football career ==
Stocker played his early football by FC Concordia Basel. In 1960 he transferred to FC Basel, Jenö Vincze was the trainer at that time. He played for Basel for eight seasons. During this time Basel won the Swiss Cup twice, in 1962–63 and again in 1966–67.

On 15 April 1963 the Wankdorf Stadium hosted the Cup Final and Basel played against favorites Grasshopper Club Zürich. Two goals after half time, one by Heinz Blumer and the second from Otto Ludwig gave Basel a 2–0 victory and their third Cup win in their history. Stocker was member of the team on that day.

A well-documented curiosity was the fact that during the winter break of their 1963–64 season the team travelled on a world tour. This saw them visit British Hong Kong, Malaysia, Singapore, Australia, New Zealand, French Polynesia, Mexico and the United States. First team manager Jiří Sobotka together with 16 players and 15 members of staff, supporters and journalists participated in this world tour from 10 January to 10 February 1964. Team captain Bruno Michaud filmed the events with his super-8 camara. The voyage around the world included 19 flights and numerous bus and train journeys. Club chairman, Lucien Schmidlin, led the group, but as they arrived in the hotel in Bangkok, he realised that 250,000 Swiss Francs were missing. The suitcase that he had filled with the various currencies was not with them. He had left it at home, but Swiss Air were able to deliver this to him within just a few days. During the tour a total of ten friendly/test games were played, these are listed in their 1963–64 season. Five wins, three draws, two defeats, but also three major injuries resulted from these test matches. A broken leg for Peter Füri, an eye injury for Walter Baumann and a knee injury for Bruno Michaud soon reduced the number of players to just 13. Stocker was a member of this tour. He played in all ten of these games.

In the 1966–67 Nationalliga A season Basel won the championship under player-manager Helmut Benthaus. Basel finished the championship one point clear of FC Zürich who finished in second position. Basel won 16 of the 26 games, drawing eight, losing twice, and they scored 60 goals conceding just 20. Stocker played 21 of the 26 domestic league games.

In that season Basel won the double. In the Cup final on 15 May 1967 Basel's opponents were Lausanne-Sports. In the former Wankdorf Stadium, Helmut Hauser scored the decisive goal via penalty. The game went down in football history due to the sit-down strike that followed this goal. After 88 minutes of play, with the score at 1–1, referee Karl Göppel awarded Basel a controversial penalty. André Grobéty had pushed Hauser gently in the back and Hauser let himself drop theatrically. Subsequently, after the 2–1 lead for Basel the Lausanne players refused to resume the game and they sat down demonstratively on the pitch. The referee had to abandon the match. Basel were awarded the cup with a 3–0 forfait.

Between the years 1960 and 1968 Stocker played a total of 309 games for Basel scoring a total of 34 goals. 171 of these games were in the Nationalliga A, 28 in the Swiss Cup, 28 were on European level and 82 were friendly games. He scored 22 goal in the domestic league, 3 in the Cup, 2 in the European matches and the other seven were scored during the test games.

In 1968, Stocker signed for FC Baden in the Nationalliga B and a year later he transferred to SC Binningen, where he ended his football career.

== International career ==
In the 1966–1967 season Stocker was called up for the Swiss national team. He played only once under team coach Alfredo Foni on 3 May 1967 in St. Jakob Stadium Basel as the Swiss lost 1–2 against Czechoslovakia.

== Honours and titles ==
Basel

- Swiss League champions: 1966–67
- Swiss Cup winner: 1962–63, 1966–67

== Sources ==
- Rotblau: Jahrbuch Saison 2017/2018. Publisher: FC Basel Marketing AG. ISBN 978-3-7245-2189-1
- Die ersten 125 Jahre. Publisher: Josef Zindel im Friedrich Reinhardt Verlag, Basel. ISBN 978-3-7245-2305-5
- Verein "Basler Fussballarchiv" Homepage
- A list of Swiss Cup Finals at RSSSF
