= Walter Löffel =

Swiss footballer (born 1936)

Personal information
- Full name: Walter Löffel
- Date of birth: 20 June 1936 (age 90)
- Place of birth: Bern, Switzerland
- Position: Midfielder

Youth career
- FC Grenchen

Senior career*
Years	Team	Apps	(Gls)
1955–1960	FC Grenchen	66	(1)
1962–1963	FC Moutier	16	(7)
1963–1964	FC Basel	5	(1)
1964–1966	FC Solothurn	20	(0)
- * Club domestic league appearances and goals

Walter Löffel (born 20 June 1936) is a Swiss former footballer who played in the 1950s and 1960s as midfielder.

Löffel first played for Grenchen from 1955 to 1960. In 1959 he was part of the Grenchen team that won the Swiss Cup against Servette 1–0 in the final. A year later they reached the final again, but this time they lost against Luzern. For the 1962–63 season Löffel moved on to play for FC Moutier in the second highest tier of Swiss football.

Löffel joined FC Basel's first team at the end of their 1962–63 season under manager Jiří Sobotka. In this season he played in only one game. This was the Cup of the Alps match on 19 June 1963 as Basel drew 1–1 with Grasshopper Club.

In the 1963–64 season Löffel played in five test games and his first competition match for his new club was the away match on 9 October in the Celtic Park in Glasgow in the 1963–64 European Cup Winners' Cup. Basel lost the match 5–0. Löffel played his domestic league debut for the club in the away game on 13 October 1963 as Basel lost 1–2 against Cantonal Neuchatel.

A well-documented curiosity was the fact that during the winter break of the 1963–64 season the team travelled on a world tour. This saw them visit British Hong Kong, Malaysia, Singapore, Australia, New Zealand, French Polynesia, Mexico and the United States. First team manager Jiří Sobotka together with 16 players and 15 members of staff, supporters and journalists participated in this world tour from 10 January to 10 February 1964. Team captain Bruno Michaud filmed the events with his super-8 camara. The voyage around the world included 19 flights and numerous bus and train journeys. Club chairman, Lucien Schmidlin, led the group, but as they arrived in the hotel in Bangkok, he realised that 250,000 Swiss Francs were missing. The suitcase that he had filled with the various currencies was not with them. He had left it at home, but Swiss Air were able to deliver this to him within just a few days. During the tour a total of ten friendly/test games were played, these are listed in their 1963–64 season. Five wins, three draws, two defeats, but also three major injuries resulted from these test matches. A broken leg for Peter Füri, an eye injury for Walter Baumann and a knee injury for Bruno Michaud soon reduced the number of players to just 13. Löffel was a member of this tour. He played in eight of these games and scored one goal.

Löffel scored his first domestic league goal for his club on 26 April 1965 in the home game at the Landhof as Basel won 3–2 against Cantonal Neuchatel. In his somewhat more than one season with the club, Löffel played a total of 24 games for Basel scoring a total of three goals. Five of these games were in the Nationalliga A, one in the 1963–64 European Cup Winners' Cup, one in the Cup of the Alps and 17were friendly games. He scored one goal in the domestic league, the other two were scored during the test games.

Following his time in Basel, Löffel moved on to play for FC Solothurn, who at that time played in the second tier of Swiss football.

== Sources ==
- Rotblau: Jahrbuch Saison 2017/2018. Publisher: FC Basel Marketing AG. ISBN 978-3-7245-2189-1
- Die ersten 125 Jahre. Publisher: Josef Zindel im Friedrich Reinhardt Verlag, Basel. ISBN 978-3-7245-2305-5
- Verein "Basler Fussballarchiv" Homepage
