= Bruno Gatti =

Swiss footballer (1941-2012)

Personal information
- Full name: Bruno Gatti
- Date of birth: 28 August 1941
- Place of birth: Switzerland
- Date of death: 2012
- Place of death: Switzerland
- Height: 1.74 m (5 ft 9 in)
- Position: Forward

Senior career*
Years	Team	Apps	(Gls)
until 1962	Black Stars		
1962–1964	FC Basel	32	(5)
1964–	Biel-Bienne		
- * Club domestic league appearances and goals

Bruno Gatti (28 August 1941 – 7 March 2012) was a Swiss footballer who played in the 1960s for Black Stars Basel, FC Basel and then FC Biel-Bienne. He played as a forward.

== Football career ==
In December 1962, Gatti transferred from the Black Stars Basel to FC Basel. Gatti wrote himself a special Swiss Cup story in this 1962/63 season. Before the winter break, he played with the Black Stars in the Cup against FC Basel and his club was knocked out of the competition. Then Gatti switched to FCB – and eventually became Cup winner with his new club. He played his debut for his new team on 30 December 1962 in the Cup as Basel won against SC Burgdorf 7–1. His first goal for the club was scored in the same match. On 15 April 1963 the Wankdorf Stadium hosted the Cup Final and Basel played against favorites Grasshopper Club. Two goals after half-time, one by Heinz Blumer and the second from Otto Ludwig, gave Basel a 2–0 victory and their third Cup win in their history. Gatti played the full 90 minutes.

He played his Nationalliga A debut on 17 February 1963 in the away game against Lugano that Basel won 3–0. He scored his first goal for his new club on 28 April 1963 against team Young Fellows as Basel won 4–2.

A well-documented curiosity was the fact that during the winter break of their 1963–64 season, the team travelled on a world tour. This saw them visit British Hong Kong, Malaysia, Singapore, Australia, New Zealand, French Polynesia, Mexico and the United States. First team manager Jiří Sobotka together with 16 players and 15 members of staff, supporters and journalists participated in this world tour from 10 January to 10 February 1964. Team captain Bruno Michaud filmed the events with his Super 8 camera. The voyage around the world included 19 flights and numerous bus and train journeys. Club chairman, Lucien Schmidlin, led the group, but as they arrived in the hotel in Bangkok, he realised that 250,000 Swiss Francs were missing. The suitcase that he had filled with the various currencies was not with them. He had left it at home, but Swiss Air were able to deliver this to him within a few days. During the tour, a total of ten friendly/test games were played, these are listed in their 1963–64 season. Five wins, three draws, two defeats, but also three major injuries resulted from these test matches. A broken leg for Peter Füri, an eye injury for Walter Baumann and a knee injury for Bruno Michaud soon reduced the number of players to just 13. Gatti was a member of this tour. He played in nine of these games and scored one goal.

Between the years 1962 and 1964, Gatti played a total of 61 games for Basel, scoring a total of 12 goals. 32 of these games were in the Nationalliga A, six in the Swiss Cup, three in the Cup of the Alps and 20 were friendly games. He scored five goals in the domestic league, one in the domestic Cup and the other six were scored during the test games.

After the 1963/64 season, Gatti transferred to Biel-Bienne and here he ended his active football career.

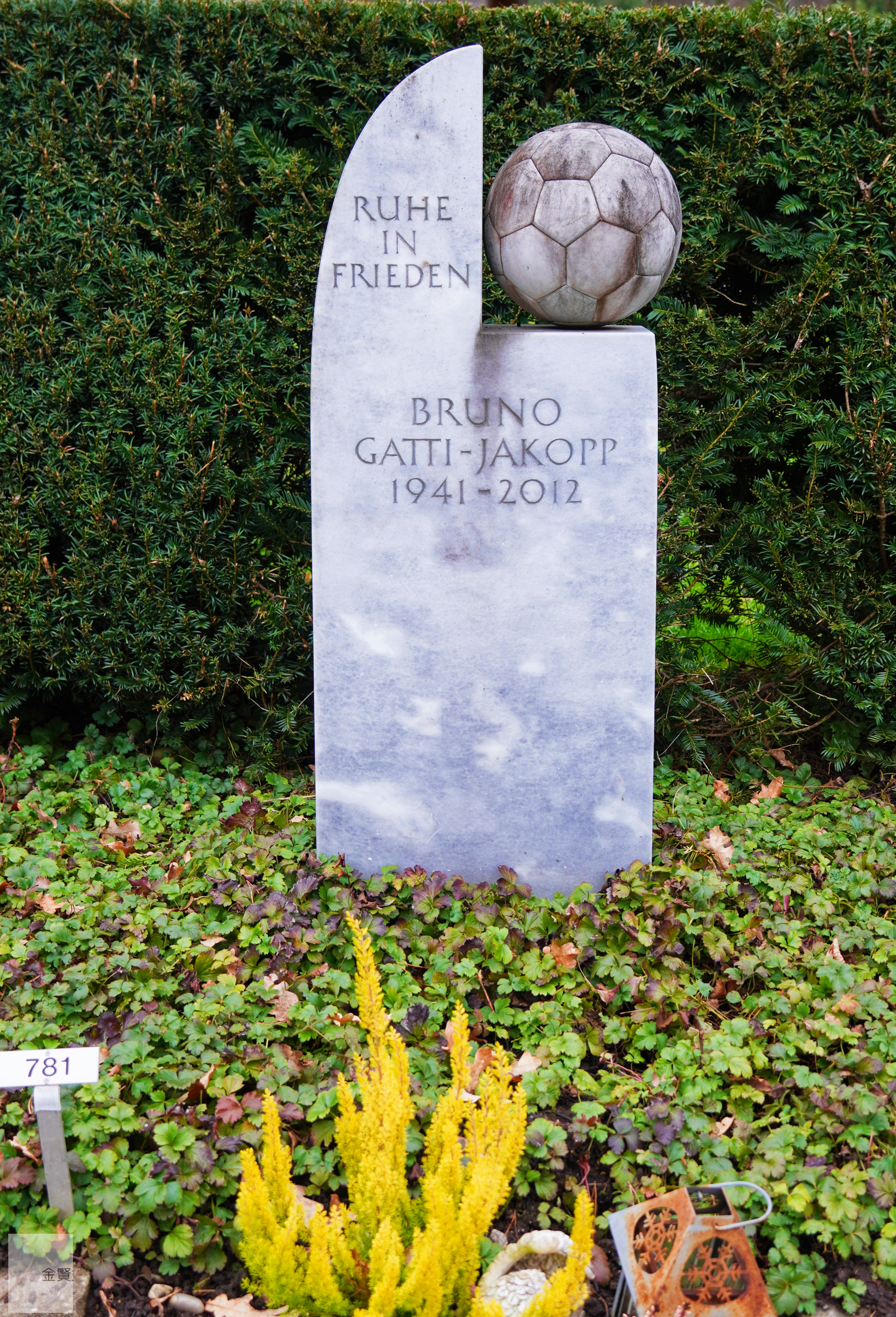
Grave of Bruno Gatti-Jakopp

Gatti was buried on the Friedhof am Hörnli near Basel.

== Honours ==
Basel

- Swiss Cup winner: 1962–63

== Sources ==
- Rotblau: Jahrbuch Saison 2017/2018. Publisher: FC Basel Marketing AG. ISBN 978-3-7245-2189-1
- Die ersten 125 Jahre. Publisher: Josef Zindel im Friedrich Reinhardt Verlag, Basel. ISBN 978-3-7245-2305-5
- Verein "Basler Fussballarchiv" Homepage
