= Kurt Stettler =

Swiss footballer (1932–2020)

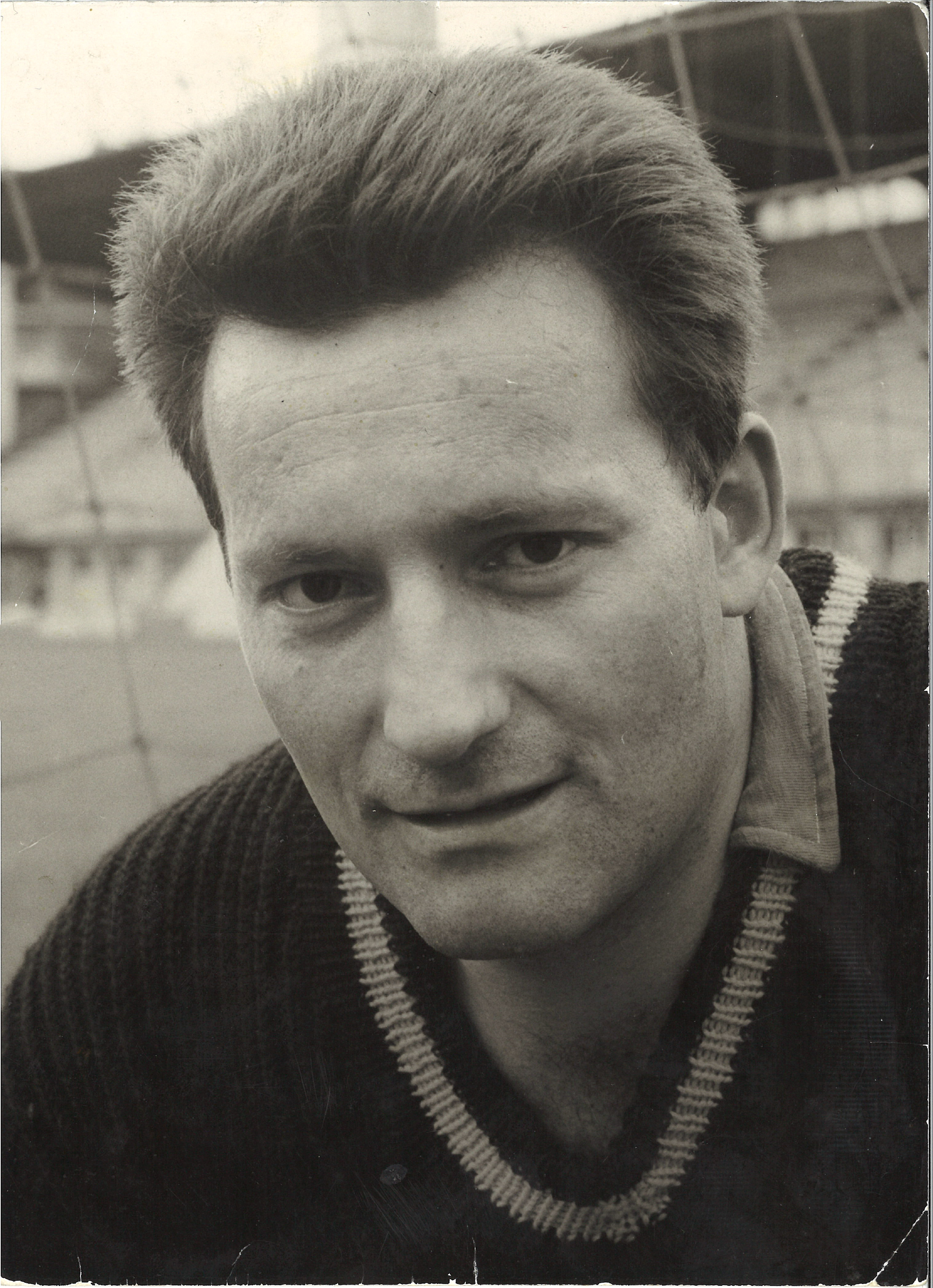

Personal information
- Full name: Kurt Stettler
- Date of birth: 21 August 1932
- Place of birth: Stettlen, Switzerland
- Date of death: 8 December 2020 (aged 88)
- Place of death: Zürich, Switzerland
- Position: Goalkeeper

Youth career
- Young Boys
- FC Ostermundigen

Senior career*
| Years | Team | Apps | (Gls) |
| 1950–1951 | FC Lugano | 1 | (0) |
| 1951–1952 | FC Locarno | 0 | (0) |
| 1952–1954 | FC Bern | 22 | (0) |
| 1954–1957 | Luzern | 55 | (0) |
| 1957–1964 | FC Basel | 160 | (0) |
| 1964–1968 | Young Fellows Zürich | 66 | (0) |
| 1978 | Young Fellows Zürich | 1 | (0) |
| Total | | 305 | (0) |

International career
| 1961–1963 | Switzerland | 2 | (0) |

Managerial career
- 1978–1979: Young Fellows Zürich
- * Club domestic league appearances and goals

Kurt Stettler (21 August 1932 – 8 December 2020) was a Swiss football goalkeeper who played for Switzerland in the 1962 FIFA World Cup.

== Football career ==
Stettler played his youth football by Young Boys. During his apprenticeship as Baker and Confectioner he played for the youth teams of FC Ostermundigen. In 1957 he transferred to FC Lugano and during the season that he was with them he made his league debut. For the next season he transferred to neighbouring FC Locarno as second goalkeeper, but he did not play a league game for them. For the 1952–53 Nationalliga A season Stettler moved on to FC Bern and advanced to becoming first goalkeeper for the team. But at the end of the 1953–54 Nationalliga A season the team suffered relegation and Stettler moved on to play for Luzern. Here he played for three seasons, despite the fact that they were also relegated to the second tier of Swiss football.

Stettler joined FC Basel's first team for their 1957–58 season under manager Rudi Strittich. After playing in three test games, Stettler played his domestic league debut for the club in the home game at the Landhof on 25 August 1957 as Basel won 8–1 against Winterthur.

Stettler stayed with Basel for seven seasons. In their 1962–63 season, with trainer Jiří Sobotka, Stettler was part of the Swiss Cup winning team as Basel beat the favourites Grasshopper Club Zürich in the Final. In the Wankdorf Stadium on 15 April 1963 Heinz Blumer and Otto Ludwig scored the goal as Basel won 2–0.

A well-documented curiosity was the fact that during the winter break of their 1963–64 season the team travelled on a world tour. This saw them visit British Hong Kong, Malaysia, Singapore, Australia, New Zealand, French Polynesia, Mexico and the United States. First team manager Jiří Sobotka together with 16 players and 15 members of staff, supporters and journalists participated in this world tour from 10 January to 10 February 1964. Team captain Bruno Michaud filmed the events with his super-8 camera. The voyage around the world included 19 flights and numerous bus and train journeys. Club chairman, Lucien Schmidlin, led the group, but as they arrived in the hotel in Bangkok, he realised that 250,000 Swiss Francs were missing. The suitcase that he had filled with the various currencies was not with them. He had left it at home, but Swiss Air were able to deliver this to him within a few days. During the tour a total of ten friendly/test games were played, these are listed in their 1963–64 season. Five wins, three draws, two defeats, but also three major injuries resulted from these test matches. A broken leg for Peter Füri, an eye injury for Walter Baumann and a knee injury for Bruno Michaud soon reduced the number of players to just 13. Stettler was a member of this tour. He played in nine of these games.

During his time with the club Stettler played a total of 253 games for Basel. 160 of these games were in the Nationalliga A and during these games he held a clean sheet on 29 occasions. Stettler played 20 games in the Swiss Cup, two games in the European Cup Winners' Cup, three in the Cup of the Alps, six were in the International Football Cup and 62 were friendly games.

Following his time with Basel, Stettler moved on to play for Young Fellows Zürich who at that time were in Nationalliga B, the second tier of Swiss football. Stettler and Young Fellows won promotion during his first season. He stayed here as goalkeeper for four seasons. He stayed with the club as youth trainer. From March 1978 he acted as trainer ad-interim for the first team until the end of the season and during this period he stood on the field as an emergency goalkeeper once and that at the age of 45. In the next season he acted solely as first team manager.

== International career ==
Stettler was called up to the Swiss national team in 1962. He played his national team debut on 9 May 1962 as Switzerland were defeated 3–1 by England. He was nominated as third goalkeeper for the 1962 FIFA World Cup but did not play a game at the tournament. Stettler played his second and last game for the Swiss team, which was also against England, on 5 June 1963, this time the Swiss were defeated 8–1.

== Personal life ==
Stettler completed his apprenticeship as Baker and Confectioner. He married Margrit, they were married for over 65 years and they had two children, daughter Ursula and son Bruno. Stettler played as amateur throughout his entire football career. In fact, he made a career for himself in Basel alongside his football playing in the "Bläsi" shopping center, where he worked his way up from salesman to manager. He later worked as an inspector for the Sport Toto Society until he retired.

After around 35 years with this employer, Stettler took up residence in Au, Zürich, on Lake Zürich and enjoyed his retirement with his wife. On 5 December 2020, he was hospitalized with COVID-19 during the COVID-19 pandemic in Switzerland. He died in his sleep three days later at the Waidspital hospital in Zürich.
