= Klaus Huber (footballer) =

Swiss footballer (born 1943)

Personal information
- Full name: Klaus Huber
- Date of birth: 1943 (age 82–83)
- Place of birth: Switzerland
- Position: Striker

Senior career*
Years	Team	Apps	(Gls)
until 1964	SpVgg Rheinfelden		
1963–1964	FC Basel	4	(0)
- * Club domestic league appearances and goals

Klaus Huber (born 1943) is a Swiss former footballer who played in the 1960s. He played as forward.

Huber played for SpVgg Rheinfelden and joined FC Basel's first team for their 1963–64 FC Basel season und team manager Jiří Sobotka. Huber played his domestic league debut for the club in the home game at the Landhof on 1 December 1963 as Basel won three goal to nil against Luzern due to the hat-trick from Karl Odermatt.

In his one season for the club, Huber played a total of six games for Basel without scoring a goals Four of these games were in the Nationalliga A and two were friendly games.

== Sources ==
- Die ersten 125 Jahre. Publisher: Josef Zindel im Friedrich Reinhardt Verlag, Basel. ISBN 978-3-7245-2305-5
- Verein "Basler Fussballarchiv" Homepage

(NB: Despite all efforts, the editors of these books and the authors in "Basler Fussballarchiv" have failed to be able to identify all the players, their date and place of birth or date and place of death, who played in the games during the early years of FC Basel)
