= Arnold Hofer =

Swiss footballer (born 1941)

Personal information
- Full name: Arnold Hofer
- Date of birth: 1941 (age 84–85)
- Place of birth: Switzerland
- Position: Forward

Senior career*
Years	Team	Apps	(Gls)
1961–1962	FC Breitenbach		
1962–1964	FC Basel	3	(3)
1964–1967	FC Luzern	24	(3)
- * Club domestic league appearances and goals

Arnold Hofer (born 1941) is a Swiss former footballer who played in the 1960s as forward.

Hofer first played for local club FC Breitenbach in the 1 Liga, third tier of Swiss football, but as they were relegated at the end of the 1961–62 season he decided to move on.

Hofer joined FC Basel's first team during their 1962–63 season under manager Jiří Sobotka. In this first season he played in only one game. This was the Cup of the Alps match on 19 June 1963 as Basel drew 1–1 with Grasshopper Club.

In the following season 1963–64, after playing in three test matches, Hofer played his domestic league debut for his new club in the away game 22 September 1963 as Basel played against Lausanne-Sport. He scored his first goal for his club in the same game as Basel won 3–2 and it was the match winning goal in the 75th minute. In his very next game a week later, at home at the Landhof against Chiasso he scored two goals and saved Basel from a defeat scoring the equaliser in the 2–2 draw two minutes from the end. In his first Swiss Cup match yet another week later he scored two goals as well as Basel beat SC Schöftland 7–0.

In his two seasons with the club Hofer played a total of nine games for Basel scoring a total of eight goals. Three of these games were in the Nationalliga A, two in the Swiss Cup, one in the Cup of the Alps and three were friendly games. He scored three goals in the domestic league, two in the cup and the other three were scored during the test games.

After his time with Basel, Hofer moved on and played three seasons with Luzern. His first game for Luzern was on 21 February 1965 as they drew goalless against Lausanne-Sport. In the home game at the Stadion Allmend on 21 March Hofer scored his first two goals for his new club as they won 2–1 after being a goal behind, Ironically enough, against his former team Basel.

== Sources ==
- Die ersten 125 Jahre. Publisher: Josef Zindel im Friedrich Reinhardt Verlag, Basel. ISBN 978-3-7245-2305-5
- Verein "Basler Fussballarchiv" Homepage

(NB: Despite all efforts, the editors of these books and the authors in "Basler Fussballarchiv" have failed to be able to identify all the players, their date and place of birth or date and place of death, who played in the games during the early years of FC Basel)
