= Raymond Simonet =

Swiss footballer (born 1940)

Personal information
- Full name: Raymond Simonet
- Date of birth: 15 April 1940 (age 86)
- Place of birth: Switzerland
- Position: Striker

Senior career*
Years	Team	Apps	(Gls)
1957–1959	FC Basel	5	(0)
1959–1961	Cantonal Neuchatel	13	(2)
1963–1964	FC Basel	6	(1)
- * Club domestic league appearances and goals

Raymond Simonet (born 15 April 1940) is a Swiss former footballer who played in the late 1950s and early 1960s as striker.

Simonet joined FC Basel's first team in their 1957–58 season under manager Rudi Strittich. Simonet played his domestic league debut for the club in the away game on 15 December 1957 as Basel played a 2–2 draw against Biel-Bienne. Simonet stayed with the team for two seasons but played only five league matches.

For the 1959–60 season Simonet moved on to play two years for Cantonal Neuchatel in the second tier of Swiss football. He returned to Basel for their 1963–64 season under manager Jiří Sobotka. Simonet scored his first goal for the club in the first game of the season on 25 August 1963, an away game against Zürich, as Basel won 2–0.

Between the years 1957 to 1959 and again from 1963 to 1964 Sompnet played a total of 20 games for Basel scoring a total of two goals. 11 of these games were in the Nationalliga A, one in the Swiss Cup, one in the European Cup Winners' Cup and seven were friendly games. He scored one goal in the domestic league and the other was scored during the test games.

== Sources ==
- Die ersten 125 Jahre. Publisher: Josef Zindel im Friedrich Reinhardt Verlag, Basel. ISBN 978-3-7245-2305-5
- Verein "Basler Fussballarchiv" Homepage
