= Karl Odermatt =

Swiss footballer (born 1942)

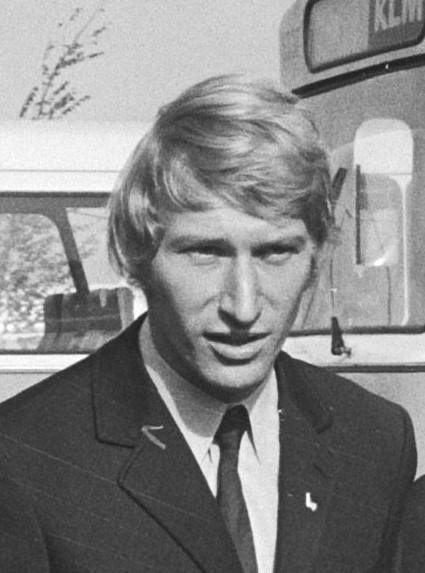
- Odermatt in 1970

Personal information
- Full name: Karl Odermatt
- Date of birth: 17 December 1942 (age 83)
- Place of birth: Lucerne, Switzerland
- Height: 1.82 m (5 ft 11 1/2 in)
- Position: Attacking midfielder

Youth career
- 1954–1962: FC Concordia Basel

Senior career*
Years	Team	Apps	(Gls)
1962	FC Concordia Basel	72	(20)
1962–1975	FC Basel	312	(80)
1975–1980	BSC Young Boys	24	(8)
Total		408	(108)

International career
1965–1973	Switzerland	50	(10)

Managerial career
- 1992: FC Basel
- * Club domestic league appearances and goals

Karl Odermatt (born 17 December 1942) is a Swiss former footballer who played for FC Basel and BSC Young Boys throughout the 1960s and 1970s. He played as a midfielder or striker and is generally regarded as one of the best players ever to have worn the FC Basel shirt. He played through, what is now thought to be, Basel's golden years under trainer and manager Helmut Benthaus with teammates such as Paul Fischli, René Hasler and Ottmar Hitzfeld.

== Career ==
Odermatt (left) captaining Switzerland in the 1974 FIFA World Cup qualification

As a small child "Karli" Odermatt grew up in Lucerne and later his family moved to Basel. A coach from the FC Concordia Basel youth system discovered him on a school football field, invited him to a club training and just a few days later he started playing in their youth team. Later he played in their first team in the 1. Liga.

"Karli" Odermatt signed for FC Basel in 1962 and in his debut, in September, against FC Lugano he scored two goals. In his first professional season, under manager Jiří Sobotka the mainly amateur team lifted the Swiss Cup, winning the final 2:0 against the favorites Grasshopper Club Zürich. Two more cup wins were to follow during Odermatts time at the St. Jakob Stadium. During the summer of 1965 Helmut Benthaus was signed as player-manager and Odermatt won his first league-winners medal in 1967. Four more league titles followed, in the years 1969, 1970, 1972 and 1973.

In 1975 he transferred to BSC Young Boys and helped them win the Swiss Cup 1977 before he retired.

Odermatt was also a Swiss internationalist, and earned 50 caps in his ten-year international career. He played mainly in centre midfield alongside Köbi Kuhn, and played in all three games at the 1966 World Cup. He scored his first of ten international goals against England at Wembley Stadium on 10 November 1971.

== Curiosity ==
A well-documented curiosity was that during the winter break of their 1963–64 season the team travelled on a world tour. This saw them visit British Hong Kong, Malaysia, Singapore, Australia, New Zealand, French Polynesia, Mexico and the United States. First team manager Jiří Sobotka together with 16 players and 15 members of staff, supporters and journalists participated in this world tour from 10 January to 10 February 1964. Team captain Bruno Michaud filmed the events with his super-8 camara. The voyage around the world included 19 flights and numerous bus and train journeys. Club chairman, Lucien Schmidlin, led the group, but as they arrived in the hotel in Bangkok, he realised that 250,000 Swiss Francs were missing. The suitcase that he had filled with the various currencies was not with them. He had left it at home, but Swiss Air were able to deliver this to him within just a few days.

During the tour a total of ten friendly/test games were played, these are listed in their 1963–64 season. Five wins, three draws, two defeats, but also three major injuries resulted from these test matches. A broken leg for Peter Füri, an eye injury for Walter Baumann and a knee injury for Bruno Michaud soon reduced the number of players to just 13. Odermatt was a member of this tour. He played in eight of these games and scored four goals.

== Personal Information ==
During 1992 he was appointed as caretaker manager of Basel for a short time, together with Bruno Rahmen, after Ernst August Künnecke was sacked and before Friedel Rausch took over.

His biography "Karli none Gool!" was published in 2002.

Odermatt has two daughters (Jacqueline and Patricia) from his first marriage and two sons (Andreas and Daniel) from his second wife.

== Honours ==
=== Club ===
Basel

- Swiss League: 1966–67, 1968–69, 1969–70, 1971–72 1972–73
- Swiss Cup: 1962–63, 1966–67, 1974–75
- Swiss League Cup: 1973

Young Boys

- Swiss Cup: 1976–77

=== Individual ===
- Swiss Footballer of the Year: 1973
