= Erdmann Lüth =

German footballer 1939–2022

Personal information
- Full name: Erdmann Lüth
- Date of birth: 2 March 1939
- Date of death: 18 February 2022 (aged 82)
- Position: Striker

Senior career*
| Years | Team | Apps | (Gls) |
| –1963 | VfR Kaiserslautern | | |
| 1963–1964 | FC Basel | 5 | (1) |

Managerial career
- 1976: 1. SC Grobenzell
- * Club domestic league appearances and goals

Erdmann Lüth (2 March 1939 – 18 February 2022) was a German footballer who played in the 1960s as a forward. After retiring from football, he worked as an architect.

== Football career ==
Lüth first played for VfR Kaiserslautern. He joined FC Basel's first team for their 1963–64 FC Basel season und team manager Jiří Sobotka. After playing in three test games, Lüth played his domestic league debut for his new club in the home game at the Landhof on 29 September 1963 as Basel played a 2–2 draw with Chiasso. Lüth scored his first goal for his club on 6 October 1930 in the away game in the Swiss Cup. In fact he scored two goals as Basel won 7–0 against SC Schöftland. Lüth scored his first league goal for the club on 17 November 1963 in the home game as Basel won 4–0 against Biel-Bienne.

In his one season with the club, Lüth played a total of ten games for Basel scoring a total of five goals. Five of these games were in the Nationalliga A, one in the Swiss Cup, one in the 1963–64 European Cup Winners' Cup and three were friendly games. He scored one goal in the domestic league, two in the Swiss Cup the other two were scored during the test games.

After his active playing career Lüth became a trainer, but the only known position as trainer was as trainer of 1. SC Grobenzell in 1976.

== Personal life ==
Erdmann Lüth was chosen as one of the 125 people in the FC Basel 125th anniversary book due to his distinctive name. Erdmann translated from German into English is "earth man". Lüth was an architect and owned an architect business in Grobenzell by Munich.

== Sources ==
- Die ersten 125 Jahre. Publisher: Josef Zindel im Friedrich Reinhardt Verlag, Basel. ISBN 978-3-7245-2305-5
- Verein "Basler Fussballarchiv" Homepage
