= Abraham Levy =

Swiss footballer (born 1939)

Personal information
- Full name: Abraham Levy
- Date of birth: 1939 (age 86–87)
- Place of birth: Switzerland
- Position: Midfielder

Senior career*
Years	Team	Apps	(Gls)
1961–1962	FC Breitenbach		
1962–1963	FC Basel	4	(1)
- * Club domestic league appearances and goals

Abraham Levy (born 1939) was a Swiss footballer who played in the 1960s as midfielder.

Levy first played for local club FC Breitenbach in the 1 Liga, third tier of Swiss football, but as they were relegated at the end of the 1961–62 season he decided to move on.

Levy joined FC Basel's first team for their 1962–63 season under manager Jiří Sobotka. After playing on two test matches, Levy played his domestic league debut for his new club in the home game at the Landhof on 28 August 1962 as Basel played against Lugano. He scored his first goal for his club in the same game as Basel won 3–0.

In his one season with the club Levy played a total of six games for Basel scoring a total of two goals. Four of these games were in the Nationalliga A and two were friendly games. He scored one goal in the domestic league, the other was scored during the test games.

== Sources ==
- Die ersten 125 Jahre. Publisher: Josef Zindel im Friedrich Reinhardt Verlag, Basel. ISBN 978-3-7245-2305-5
- Verein "Basler Fussballarchiv" Homepage

(NB: Despite all efforts, the editors of these books and the authors in "Basler Fussballarchiv" have failed to be able to identify all the players, their date and place of birth or date and place of death, who played in the games during the early years of FC Basel)
