= Werner Meier (footballer) =

Swiss footballer (born 1937)

Personal information
- Full name: Werner Meier
- Date of birth: 15 April 1937 (age 89)
- Position: Striker

Senior career*
Years	Team	Apps	(Gls)
1954–1957	FC Nordstern Basel	42	(17)
1957–1958	Urania Genève Sport	0	(0)
1960–1962	FC Nordstern Basel		
1962–1963	FC Basel	5	(1)
- * Club domestic league appearances and goals

Werner Meier (born 15 April 1937) is a Swiss former footballer who played in the 1950s and 1960s as striker.

Meier first played for Nordstern Basel in the Nationalliga B, the second tier of Swiss football, for at least three years, scoring 17 goals in 42 league matches. He transferred to Urania Genève Sport in 1957. In the 1960–61 season he again played for Nordstern but the team were relegated to the third tier. He played for them another year before moving on.

Meier joined FC Basel's first team for their 1962–63 season under manager Jiří Sobotka. In his first game for his new club in the 1962–63 Intertoto Cup, Meier scored his first two goals for the club, but this could not help the team from being defeated 3–4 by PSV Eindhoven. After one more match in the Intertoto Cup and one test match Meier played his domestic league debut for the club in the home game at the Landhof on 28 August 1962 as Basel played against Lugano and won 3–0. He scored his first league goal for his club on 14 September in the away game against Grenchen, but Basel were defeated 2–3.

In his one season with the club, Meier played ten games for Basel scoring three goals. Five of these games were in the Nationalliga A, one in the Swiss Cup, two in the InterToto Cup and two were friendly games. He scored one goal in the domestic league and the aforementioned two in the Intertoto Cup.

== Sources ==
- Rotblau: Jahrbuch Saison 2017/2018. Publisher: FC Basel Marketing AG. ISBN 978-3-7245-2189-1
- Die ersten 125 Jahre. Publisher: Josef Zindel im Friedrich Reinhardt Verlag, Basel. ISBN 978-3-7245-2305-5
- Verein "Basler Fussballarchiv" Homepage
