= René Jeker =

Swiss footballer (born 1938)

Personal information
- Date of birth: 6 September 1938 (age 88)
- Place of birth: Switzerland
- Position: Goalkeeper

Youth career
- until 1956: FC Solothurn

Senior career*
Years	Team	Apps	(Gls)
1956–1957	FC Solothurn		
1957–1958	FC Concordia Basel		
1958–1963	FC Basel	14	(0)
1963–1964	FC Winterthur	11	(0)
1965–1966	FC Porrentruy	5	(0)
- * Club domestic league appearances and goals

René Jeker (born 6 September 1938) is a Swiss former footballer who played in the late 1950s and in the 1960s as goalkeeper.

Jeker first played for FC Solothurn in the second tier of Swiss football and during the 1957–1958 season he transferred to Concordia Basel. Jeker then joined FC Basel's first team for their 1958–59 season under manager Rudi Strittich. After playing in one test game, Jeker played his domestic league debut for the club in the home game at the Landhof on 28 September as Basel played a goalless draw with Chiasso.

Jeker stayed with Basel for five seasons as second goalkeeper behind Swiss national keeper Kurt Stettler. In their 1962–63 season Basel won the Swiss Cup. During this time he played a total of 40 games for Basel. 14 of these games were in the Nationalliga A, one was in the Swiss Cup, two were in the Cup of the Alps, five were in the International Football Cup and 18 were friendly games.

After his time in Basel, Jeker moved on to play for one season for Winterthur who played in the Nationalliga B, the second tier of Swiss football. A year later he moved on to FC Porrentruy who also played in the Nationalliga B at that time.

== Sources ==
- Die ersten 125 Jahre. Publisher: Josef Zindel im Friedrich Reinhardt Verlag, Basel. ISBN 978-3-7245-2305-5
- Verein "Basler Fussballarchiv" Homepage
