= Erwin Ballabio =

Swiss footballer (1918-2008)

Personal information
- Date of birth: 20 October 1918
- Place of birth: Bettlach, Switzerland
- Date of death: 4 March 2008 (aged 89)
- Place of death: Grenchen, Switzerland
- Position: Goalkeeper

Youth career
- FC Grenchen

Senior career*
Years	Team	Apps	(Gls)
1934–1956	FC Grenchen	?	(?)
1940–1941	→ Lausanne Sports		
1946–1948	→ FC Thun		

International career
1939–1947	Switzerland	27	(0)

Managerial career
- 1955–1965: FC Grenchen
- 1967–1969: Switzerland
- * Club domestic league appearances and goals

Erwin Ballabio (20 October 1918 – 4 March 2008) was a Swiss football goalkeeper. He played for FC Grenchen and the Swiss national team. Known as the "Black Panther" he kept goal for eight years for the Swiss team.

== Early life ==
In 1941 Ballabio became the town of Grenchen's third policeman.

== As a player ==
=== FC Grenchen ===
Ballabios was originally a youth player at FC Grenchen, and made his change to goalkeeper when 7–0 down playing for the youth team his manager placed the young defender in goal where he went on to save a penalty, starting his career as a keeper. He was called into the first team aged sixteen and enjoyed a long career as first choice keeper. His only football away from Grenchen was three seasons of vocational training, one at Lausanne Sports and the other two at FC Thun. He retired, becoming manager in 1956 to give younger keepers a chance. However, in 1959 he came out of a four-year retirement for one match, to replace Grenchen's injured first choice keeper in the Swiss Cup final against Servette. He kept a clean sheet and Grenchen won the cup.

=== Switzerland ===
Ballabio's debut came in February 1939 against Portugal with his last match in June 1947. His total of 27 appearances for his country make him the third most capped keeper, which is a remarkable achievement considering the lack of fixtures due to World War II.

== As a manager ==
=== FC Grenchen ===
Almost immediately after retiring as a player, Ballabio took charge of the FC Grenchen team. During his ten-year reign he took the team to their only Schweizer Cup win in 1959, and led them to a final defeat the following year. With Ballabio at the helm FC Grenchen recorded their best league performances finishing runner-up in 1959 and to third place in 1964.

=== Switzerland ===
Ballabio was appointed as national coach on 24 May 1967, replacing Alfredo Foni. In his first match, a Euro 1968 qualifier, his side recorded a 7–1 win against Romania, however they failed to qualify. He remained in charge for World Cup qualification but after a 1–1 draw with Portugal on 2 November 1969 meant they failed to qualify he was sacked.

==== Statistics ====
Team	Nat	From	To	Record				
Team	Nat	From	To	G	W	L	D	Win %
FC Grenchen	(Switzerland)	1955	1965					
Switzerland	(Switzerland)	24 May 1967	2 November 1969	17	5	4	8	29.41
