= Jürgen Wähling =

German footballer and manager

Personal information
- Date of birth: 6 December 1940 (age 85)
- Place of birth: Hamburg, Germany
- Position: Forward

Senior career*
| Years | Team | Apps | (Gls) |
- Grün-Weiß 07 Hamburg
| 1964–1965 | FC Luzern | | |
| 1965–1966 | SC Tasmania 1900 Berlin | | |
| 1968–1970 | FC Langenthal | | |

International career
| 1958 | Germany U18 | 2 | (0) |

Managerial career
- 1968–1970: FC Langenthal
- 1970–1971: Hamburger Fussball-Verband
- 1972–1974: Werder Bremen II
- 1974–1978: B 1909
- 1979–1981: Vejle BK
- 1981–1983: Esbjerg fB
- 1984–1986: AGF
- 1986–1988: Hannover 96
- 1989: TuS Hoisdorf
- 1991–1992: TuS Hoisdorf]
- 1992–1995: FC St. Pauli II
- 1999: Trabzonspor
- * Club domestic league appearances and goals

Jürgen Wähling (born 6 December 1940), is a German former football player and manager.

== Honours ==
=== Manager ===
AGF

- Danish Superliga: 1986
