= 1934–35 Czechoslovak First League =

Czechoslovak First League
- Season: 1934–35
- Champions: Slavia Prague
- Relegated: Bohemians Prague; Čechie Karlín
- Top goalscorer: František Svoboda (27 goals)

Statistics of Czechoslovak First League in the 1934–35 season.

== Overview ==
It was contested by 12 teams, and Slavia Prague won the championship. František Svoboda was the league's top scorer with 27 goals.

== League standings ==
Pos	Team	Pld	W	D	L	GF	GA	GR	Pts
1	Slavia Prague (C)	22	15	6	1	80	29	2.759	36
2	Sparta Prague	22	17	1	4	74	26	2.846	35
3	SK Židenice	22	11	4	7	42	32	1.313	26
4	Viktoria Plzeň	22	11	3	8	39	32	1.219	25
5	SK Kladno	22	11	1	10	48	50	0.960	23
6	SK Prostějov	22	8	7	7	45	48	0.938	23
7	DFC Prag	22	8	4	10	40	47	0.851	20
8	Teplitzer FK	22	7	3	12	35	50	0.700	17
9	SK Plzeň	22	6	4	12	39	49	0.796	16
10	AFK Kolín	22	7	2	13	34	54	0.630	16
11	Bohemians Prague (R)	22	4	6	12	35	55	0.636	14
12	Čechie Karlín (R)	22	5	3	14	35	74	0.473	13

Source: rsssf.com
(C) Champions; (R) Relegated

== Results ==
Home \ Away	KOL	BOH	KAR	DFC	KLA	SKP	PRO	ŽID	SLA	SPA	TEP	PLZ
AFK Kolín		2–2	2–3	0–2	1–0	2–2	0–2	2–0	2–4	2–1	3–1	0–2
Bohemians Prague	8–2		3–2	0–0	4–5	0–5	3–3	1–1	1–1	2–3	2–3	1–2
Čechie Karlín	1–2	4–0		0–2	2–2	1–0	2–2	1–4	3–11	1–5	3–3	0–1
DFC Prag	2–3	1–1	1–2		7–2	3–2	0–1	3–2	1–1	3–7	2–1	2–1
SK Kladno	0–4	1–3	4–2	4–2		2–0	3–2	2–1	0–1	4–2	3–0	2–1
SK Plzeň	3–2	1–2	4–1	4–0	2–4		3–0	1–2	2–2	0–3	1–1	3–1
SK Prostějov	6–2	3–1	2–3	1–1	3–2	3–2		2–2	2–2	0–1	4–0	4–2
SK Židenice	1–0	1–0	1–0	4–3	2–0	4–1	1–1		1–3	4–0	5–0	3–0
Slavia Prague	7–0	4–1	5–1	4–2	5–3	8–0	7–2	3–2		0–0	2–2	2–1
Sparta Prague	2–1	5–0	8–2	5–1	3–0	4–2	6–0	6–1	2–1		5–0	4–1
Teplitzer FK	2–1	3–0	5–0	0–2	0–4	4–1	4–1	3–0	0–3	0–2		3–4
Viktoria Plzeň	3–1	3–0	7–1	2–0	3–1	0–0	1–1	0–0	1–4	1–0	2–0	

Source: statistiky1ligy.fotbal.cz
Legend: Blue = home team win; Yellow = draw; Red = away team win.
