= Niklaus Stöckli =

Swiss footballer (born 1939)

Personal information
- Full name: Niklaus Stöckli
- Date of birth: 26 February 1939 (age 87)
- Place of birth: Switzerland
- Position: Forward

Senior career*
Years	Team	Apps	(Gls)
1961–1963	FC Basel	0	(0)
- * Club domestic league appearances and goals

Niklaus Stöckli (born 26 February 1939) is a Swiss former footballer who played in the 1960s as forward.

Stöckli joined Basel's first team for their 1961–62 season under manager Jiří Sobotka. Stöckli played his first game for his new club in the 1961–62 International Football Cup game away against IF Elfsborg on 25 June 1961. He scored his first goal for his club on 27 May 1962 in the away game in the 1962–63 Intertoto Cup. But this goal could not help the team from being defeated, because Basel lost the game 4–3 against PSV Eindhoven.

Between the years 1961 and 1963, Stöckli played a total of eight games for Basel scoring a total of two goals. However, none of these games were in the Nationalliga A. He did play one game in the Swiss Cup, five games were in the International Football Cup and two were friendly games. He scored both his goals in the International Football Cup.

== Sources ==
- Die ersten 125 Jahre. Publisher: Josef Zindel im Friedrich Reinhardt Verlag, Basel. ISBN 978-3-7245-2305-5
- Verein "Basler Fussballarchiv" Homepage
