= André Grobéty =

Swiss footballer (1933–2013)

Personal information
- Date of birth: 22 June 1933
- Place of birth: Geneva, Switzerland
- Date of death: 20 July 2013 (aged 80)
- Height: 1.70 m (5 ft 7 in)
- Position: Right-back

Senior career*
Years	Team	Apps	(Gls)
1951–1958	Servette		
1958–1968	Lausanne-Sport		
1968–1969	FC Meyrin		

International career
1957–1966	Switzerland	41	(1)
- * Club domestic league appearances and goals

André Grobéty (22 June 1933 – 20 July 2013) was a Swiss footballer who played as a right-back.

== Career ==
During his career, Grobéty played at the club level for Servette FC, Lausanne Sports, and FC Meyrin.

In the Swiss Cup final on 15 May 1967, in the former Wankdorf Stadium, Grobéty played for Lausanne, the opponents were Basel. Helmut Hauser scored the decisive goal via penalty. The game went down in football history due to the sit-down strike that followed this goal. After 88 minutes of play, with the score at 1–1, referee Karl Göppel awarded Basel a controversial penalty. (Grobéty had pushed Hauser gently in the back and he let himself drop theatrically.) Subsequent to the 2–1 lead for Basel the Lausanne players refused to resume the game and they sat down demonstratively on the pitch. The referee had to abandon the match. Basel were awarded the cup with a 3–0 forfait.

Grobéty also earned 41 caps and scored one goal for the Switzerland national team, and participated in the 1962 FIFA World Cup and the 1966 FIFA World Cup.
