= Heinz Blumer =

Swiss footballer (born 1942)

Personal information
- Full name: Heinz Blumer
- Date of birth: 7 January 1942 (age 84)
- Place of birth: Switzerland
- Height: 1.82 m (6 ft 0 in)
- Position: Defender

Senior career*
Years	Team	Apps	(Gls)
1961–1965	FC Basel	72	(30)
1965	Chiasso	14	(3)
1965–1967	Lugano	32	(4)
1967–1968	Lausanne-Sport	19	(4)
1968–1970	Lugano	38	(0)
1970–1977	Mendrisio		
- * Club domestic league appearances and goals

Heinz Blumer (* 7 January 1942) is a Swiss retired footballer who played in the 1960s and 70s. He played mainly in the position as defender, but also as midfielder.

== Football career ==
=== Basel ===
Blumer played in the youth teams of FC Basel and advanced to their first team in 1961. Between the years 1961 and 1965 he played a total of 135 games for Basel scoring a total of 56 goals. 72 of these games were in the Nationalliga A, 15 games were in the Swiss Cup, 14 were international games (Cup of the Alps, UEFA Cup Winners' Cup, Inter-Cities Fairs Cup) and 34 were friendly games. He scored 30 goal in the domestic league, 8 in the Cup, 3 international and the other 15 were scored during the test games.

In his first season for Basel Blumer played 16 league games, scoring six goals. In his league debut on 20 April 1962 he scored the first two goals as Basel won 4–2 in the home game at the Landhof against Biel-Bienne. In his second season he played 22 of the 26 league games scoring 16 times, thus was the team's league top scorer. In the final of the Swiss Cup on 15 April 1963, Blumer scored the first goal as Basel won the Cup with a 2–0 win.

In his third season Blumer played 23 domestic league games scoring five times. In the 1963–64 European Cup Winners' Cup first round Basel were matched against Celtic but lost 1–10 on aggregate. Blumer scored the only Basel goal. In the following season Blumer played the first half of the season, in 11 games he scored three goals.

A well-documented curiosity was the fact that during the winter break of their 1963–64 season the team travelled on a world tour. This saw them visit British Hong Kong, Malaysia, Singapore, Australia, New Zealand, French Polynesia, Mexico and the United States. First team manager Jiří Sobotka together with 16 players and 15 members of staff, supporters and journalists participated in this world tour from 10 January to 10 February 1964. Team captain Bruno Michaud filmed the events with his super-8 camara. The voyage around the world included 19 flights and numerous bus and train journeys. Club chairman, Lucien Schmidlin, led the group, but as they arrived in the hotel in Bangkok, he realised that 250,000 Swiss Francs were missing. The suitcase that he had filled with the various currencies was not with them. He had left it at home, but Swiss Air were able to deliver this to him within just a few days. During the tour a total of ten friendly/test games were played, these are listed in their 1963–64 season. Five wins, three draws, two defeats, but also three major injuries resulted from these test matches. A broken leg for Peter Füri, an eye injury for Walter Baumann and a knee injury for Bruno Michaud soon reduced the number of players to just 13. Blumer was a member of this tour. He played in all ten games and scored six goals.

=== Chiasso ===
In the second half of the 1964–65 Nationalliga A season Blumer moved to Chiasso, playing 14 games and scoring 3 goals. But he could not stop Chiasso being relegated at the end of the season.

=== Lugano, Lausanne, Lugano ===
Blumer moved on to Lugano, where he played for two seasons. He played for Lausanne-Sport in the 1967–68 season, returning to Lugano for another two years.

=== Mendrisio ===
In 1970 Blumer transferred to Mendrisio and stayed there 8 years before retiring from his football career.

== Honours and Titles ==
Basel

- Swiss Cup winner: 1963

== Sources ==
- Rotblau: Jahrbuch Saison 2017/2018. Publisher: FC Basel Marketing AG. ISBN 978-3-7245-2189-1
- Die ersten 125 Jahre. Publisher: Josef Zindel im Friedrich Reinhardt Verlag, Basel. ISBN 978-3-7245-2305-5
- Verein "Basler Fussballarchiv" Homepage
