= Bruno Michaud =

Swiss footballer and manager (1935–1997)

Personal information
- Date of birth: 14 October 1935
- Place of birth: Switzerland
- Date of death: 1 November 1997 (aged 62)
- Place of death: Thailand
- Position: Defender

Youth career
- FC Basel

Senior career*
Years	Team	Apps	(Gls)
1955–1957	Basel	13	(0)
1957–1959	Lausanne-Sport	14	(0)
1960–1970	Basel	255	(19)

International career
1967–1969	Switzerland	15	(0)

Managerial career
- 1972–1973: Switzerland
- * Club domestic league appearances and goals

Bruno Michaud (14 October 1935 – 1 November 1997) was a Swiss football player, football coach and politician. He played as a defender mainly for FC Basel and in the Switzerland national team.

== Football career ==
=== Club ===
Despite a two-year period with Lausanne-Sport in the late 1950s, FC Basel was Michaud's regular club. Between 1955 and 1970, he belonged to the FCB first team and, as their defensive chief, he was one of the decisive co-founders of the "era Benthaus". He won the Swiss Cup twice and the championship three times under coaches Georges Sobotka and Helmut Benthaus. The fact that Michaud only reached the national team at the age of 32 had to do with the skills of his predecessor, because for years the position in the defensive centre was occupied by a similarly large sportsman, Heinz Schneiter. Nevertheless, after his international debut on 24 May 1967, in the legendary 7–1 against Romania, Michaud brought it to a total of 15 international matches. After his retirement from active football, Michaud remained in the business. First as a technical director for the club at Benthaus' side, then from April 1972 to May 1973 as an interim national coach. He took over the position from Louis Maurer and in that year he achieved a balanced record, seven international matches, one win, one defeat and five draws.

Michaud played his early football in Basel's youth teams and was brought up to their first team by head coach Béla Sárosi during their 1955–56 season. At the end of that season, on 10 June 1956, he played his domestic league debut in the home game at the Landhof as Basel won 9–1 against Fribourg. In the following season he had 11 appearances and then he moved to FC Lausanne-Sport. Under head coach Walter Presch in the 1957–58 Nationalliga A season, Michaud played in nine of the 26 league games. In the following season, he received less playing time and so he returned to his club of origin for the 1959–60 season as Jenő Vincze became Basel's new head coach. In the first game of that season, on 23 August 1959, Michaud scored his first goal for the team, from a penalty kick. However, it could not help the team, because they were defeated 3–2 by Grenchen.

Michaud's first Swiss Cup win was in their 1962–63 season. The Wankdorf Stadium hosted the cup final on 15 April 1963, and Basel played against favourites Grasshopper Club Zürich. Two goals after half time, one by Heinz Blumer and the second from Otto Ludwig gave Basel a 2–0 victory.

Michaud's first championship title was achieved in Basel's 1966–67 season. In that same season, Michaud also won the double with Basel. In the Cup final, again in the former Wankdorf Stadium, on 15 May 1967, Basel's opponents were Lausanne-Sports. Helmut Hauser scored the decisive goal via a penalty. The game went down in football history due to the sit-down strike that followed that penalty goal. With the score at 1–1 after 88 minutes of play, referee Karl Göppel awarded Basel a controversial penalty. André Grobéty had pushed Hauser gently in the back, and Hauser let himself drop theatrically. After the 2–1 lead for Basel, the Lausanne players subsequently refused to resume the game and they sat down demonstratively on the pitch. The referee was forced to abandon the match. Basel were awarded the cup with a 3–0 forfait.

Michaud won his second championship title in Basel's 1968–69 season. They finished the season just one point clear of second-placed Lausanne-Sports. Basel won 13 of the 26 games, drawing ten, losing three times; they scored 48 goals, conceding 28. He won the championship with Basel for the third time in this 1969–70 season. The team again finished one point clear of Lausanne-Sports, who again ended in second position. Basel won 15 of the 26 games, drawing seven, losing four times. They scored 59 goals, conceding 23.

During his time with Basel, Michaud played a total of 468 games for Basel, scoring a total of 30 goals. 268 of these games were in the Swiss Super League, 45 in the Swiss Cup, 43 in the UEFA competitions (European Cup, European Cup Winners' Cup, Fairs Cup and Cup of the Alps) and 112 were friendly games. He scored 19 goals in the domestic league, two in the cup, one in the European games and the other eight were scored during the test games.

After having an active career, Michaud stayed with the club and became technical director for the period that Benthaus remained trainer.

=== International playing career ===
Michaud was called up by trainers Alfredo Foni and Erwin Ballabio into the Switzerland national football team. He played fifteen times for the Switzerland national team. He played his debut for Switzerland on 24 May 1967 in the Hardturm, in Zürich, in front of 21,337 spectators in the legendary 7–1 win against Romania. Michaud played his last game for his country on 15 October 1969 in Thessaloniki under coach Erwin Ballabio. The 1970 FIFA World Cup qualification game for UEFA Group 1 ended with a 1–4 defeat against Greece.

=== International coaching career ===
Following his playing career, Michaud acted as assistant to trainer Louis Maurer of the Switzerland national team. After Maurer's early retirement as manager in November 1970, Michaud took over as manager. He was the team manager from April 1972 to May 1973.

His first game as coach was on 26 April 1972 in a friendly match against Sweden, which ended in a 1–1 draw. His final game in charge was on 9 May 1973 as Switzerland played a 0–0 draw against Turkey. Michaud's balance as a seven-time national team trainer was one win, five draws and one defeat, four goals for, but seven against. René Hüssy followed Michaud as national team coach. Michaud stayed with the national team. He was the delegation leader of the Switzerland national team and later a senior member in the Committee of the National League (Responsible for game scheduling).

== Curiosity ==
A well-documented curiosity was the fact that during the winter break of their 1963–64 season, the team travelled on a world tour. This saw them visit British Hong Kong, Malaysia, Singapore, Australia, New Zealand, French Polynesia, Mexico and the United States. First team manager Jiří Sobotka together with 16 players and 15 members of staff, supporters and journalists participated in this world tour from 10 January to 10 February 1964. Team captain Michaud filmed the events with his super-8 camara. The voyage around the world included 19 flights and numerous bus and train journeys. Club chairman, Lucien Schmidlin, led the group, but as they arrived in the hotel in Bangkok, he realised that 250,000 Swiss Francs were missing. The suitcase that he had filled with the various currencies was not with them. He had left it at home, but Swiss Air were able to deliver it to him within just a few days.

During the tour, a total of ten friendly/test games were played; these are listed in their 1963–64 season. Five wins, three draws, two defeats, but also three major injuries resulted from these test matches. A broken leg for Peter Füri, an eye injury for Walter Baumann and a knee injury for Michaud himself soon reduced the number of players to just 13. Michaud played in the first five of these games.

== Private life ==
Michaud was an impressive example of an intelligent and versatile man who, following his sports career, also found his way to the top professionally. First, he worked for an airline. Then, at the "National", one of the leading houses in the insurance industry, he became regional director. He also made his services available to the public for a few years as a member of the Grand Council. He was a member of the Social Democratic Party of Switzerland and in the 1968 election he was voted into the Grand Council of Basel-Stadt. He held this seat until 1976.

Michaud was married, and he and his wife Susy had a daughter named Aimée. He died completely unexpectedly on 1 November 1997 at the age of 62 during the holidays in Thailand on a tennis court.

== Honours ==
Basel

- Swiss League champions: 1966–67, 1968–69, 1969–70
- Swiss Cup winner: 1962–63, 1966–67
- Swiss Cup runner-up: 1969–70
- Coppa delle Alpi winner: 1969
- Uhren Cup winner: 1969

== Sources ==
- Josef Zindel (2018). FC Basel 1893. Die ersten 125 Jahre (in German). Basel: Friedrich Reinhardt Verlag. ISBN 978-3-7245-2305-5.
- Verein "Basler Fussballarchiv" Homepage
- Rotblau: Jahrbuch Saison 2015/2016. Publisher: FC Basel Marketing AG. ISBN 978-3-7245-2050-4
- Beat Jung (Hg.): Die Nati. Die Geschichte der Schweizer Fussball-Nationalmannschaft. Verlag Die Werkstatt, Göttingen 2006, ISBN 3-89533-532-0
- A list of Swiss Cup Finals at RSSSF
