= Walter Baumann =

Swiss footballer (born 1942)

Personal information
- Full name: Walter Baumann
- Date of birth: 21 July 1942
- Positions: Defender; forward

Youth career
- until 1963: FC Pratteln

Senior career*
Years	Team	Apps	(Gls)
1962–1965	Basel	28	(2)
1965–1968	La Chaux-de-Fonds	24	(3)
1968–1969	FC Moutier	7	(1)
- * Club domestic league appearances and goals

Walter Baumann (born 21 July 1942) is a Swiss former footballer who played in the 1960s. He played mainly as a forward, but also as a defender.

== Football career ==
Baumann joined Basel's first team during their 1962–63 season under trainer Jiří Sobotka. On 15 April 1963 the Wankdorf Stadium hosted the Cup Final and Basel played against favorites Grasshopper Club. Two goals after half time, one by Heinz Blumer and the second from Otto Ludwig gave Basel a 2–0 victory and their third Cup win in the club's history. Baumann was not in the team that played, but in the squad.

After playing in the Cup of the Alps matches and five test games he played in the 1963–64 European Cup Winners' Cup match against Celtic on 17 September 1963. He made his domestic league debut for the club on 22 September as Basel beat Lausanne-Sport 3–2. He scored his first goal for his club on 27 October in the home game at the Landhof as Basel won 2–1 against Grasshopper Club.

During the winter break of their 1963–64 season the team travelled on a world tour. This saw them visit British Hong Kong, Malaysia, Singapore, Australia, New Zealand, French Polynesia, Mexico and the United States. First-team manager Jiří Sobotka together with 16 players and 15 members of staff, supporters and journalists participated in this world tour from 10 January to 10 February 1964. Team captain Bruno Michaud filmed the events with his super-8 camera. The voyage around the world included 19 flights and numerous bus and train journeys. Club chairman, Lucien Schmidlin, led the group, but as they arrived in the hotel in Bangkok, he realised that 250,000 Swiss Francs were missing. The suitcase that he had filled with the various currencies was not with them. He had left it at home, but Swiss Air were able to deliver this to him within just a few days. During the tour a total of ten friendly/test games were played, these are listed in their 1963–64 season. Five wins, three draws, two defeats, but also three major injuries resulted from these test matches. A broken leg for Peter Füri, a knee injury for Bruno Michaud and an eye injury for Baumann himself, soon reduced the number of players to 13. Despite his injury he played in five games.

In three-and-a-half seasons between 1962 and 1966 Baumann played 65 games for Basel and scoring six goals; 28 games were in the Nationalliga A, 7 in the Swiss Cup, 7 in European competitions (European Cup Winners' Cup, Cup of the Alps, Inter-Cities Fairs Cup) and 23 were friendly games. He scored two goals in the domestic league, one in the Swiss Cup and the other three during the test games.

Following his time with Basel, Baumann moved on to La Chaux-de-Fonds and later to FC Moutier.

== Sources ==
- Rotblau: Jahrbuch Saison 2017/2018. Publisher: FC Basel Marketing AG. ISBN 978-3-7245-2189-1
- Die ersten 125 Jahre. Publisher: Josef Zindel im Friedrich Reinhardt Verlag, Basel. ISBN 978-3-7245-2305-5
- Verein "Basler Fussballarchiv" Homepage
