= Peter Füri =

Swiss footballer and manager (1937–2015)

Personal information
- Full name: Peter Füri
- Date of birth: 9 October 1937
- Place of birth: Basel, Switzerland
- Date of death: 11 May 2015 (aged 77)
- Place of death: Muttenz, Switzerland
- Positions: Striker; defender (Note: Füri played a defender later in his career.)

Youth career
- until 1949: FC St. Clara (Basel)
- 1949–1952: FC Basel

Senior career*
Years	Team	Apps	(Gls)
1953–1958	FC Concordia Basel		
1958–1960	FC La Chaux-de-Fonds		
1960–1965	FC Basel	71	(2)
1966–1968	SC Binningen		

Managerial career
- 1966–1968: SC Binningen
- * Club domestic league appearances and goals

Peter Füri (9 October 1937 – 11 May 2015) was a Swiss football player and manager, who played during the 1950s and 1960s.

== Career ==
Füri started his youth football with the small local club FC St. Clara and later joined the youth teams of FC Basel. During his active career Füri first played as a striker. After his youth football he moved tor FC Concordia Basel who at that time played in the 1st League, the third tier of Swiss football. At the end of the 1956–57 season Concordia won their central group and in the play-offs became 1st League champions and were promoted to the Nationalliga B. Füri stayed with the club and played the next two season for the team. However, at the end of the 1958–59 season they were second last in the division and suffered relegation.

Top tier club FC La Chaux-de-Fonds took advantage of the situation and signed Füri with a semi-professional contract. He played with them for two seasons and they let him appear as a defender. After two seasons Füri returned to his home town.

Füri joined Basel's first team for their 1961–62 season under Czechoslovak head coach Jiří Sobotka. He played his domestic league debut for his new club, again as defender, in the away game on 5 November 1961 as Basel were beaten 0–1 by Young Fellows Zürich. He scored his first goal with his new team on 11 March 1962 in the away game as Basel drew 2–2 against Lugano.

In the 1962–63 season Füri was member of the Basel squad who won the Swiss Cup by beating the favourites Grasshopper Club Zürich in the final at the Wankdorf Stadium by 2–0. Basel head coach at that time was Georges Sobotka and team mates were Swiss international goalkeeper Kurt Stettler, team captain Bruno Michaud and Karl Odermatt. Füri played in all cup games except the final because he became ill on the day.

A well-documented curiosity was the fact that during the winter break of their 1963–64 season the team travelled on a world tour. This saw them visit British Hong Kong, Malaysia, Singapore, Australia, New Zealand, French Polynesia, Mexico and the United States. First team manager Jiří Sobotka together with 16 players and 15 members of staff, supporters and journalists participated in this world tour from 10 January to 10 February 1964. Team captain Bruno Michaud filmed the events with his super-8 camara. The voyage around the world included 19 flights and numerous bus and train journeys. Club chairman, Lucien Schmidlin, led the group, but as they arrived in the hotel in Bangkok, he realised that 250,000 Swiss Francs were missing. The suitcase that he had filled with the various currencies was not with them. He had left it at home, but Swiss Air were able to deliver this to him within just a few days. During the tour a total of ten friendly/test games were played, these are listed in their 1963–64 season. Five wins, three draws, two defeats, but also three major injuries resulted from these test matches. An eye injury for Walter Baumann, a knee injury for Bruno Michaud and a broken leg for Peter Füri himself, soon reduced the number of players to just 13. The injury cost Füri an entire year of his football career.

Between the years 1961 and 1966 Füri played a total of 127 games for Basel scoring a total of three goals. 71 of these games were in the Nationalliga A, 14 in the Swiss Cup, ten in the european competitions (Cup of the Alps, European Cup Winners' Cup, UEFA Intertoto Cup) and 32 were friendly games. He scored two goals in the domestic league and the other was scored during the test games.

Füri ended his football career as player-manager with SC Binningen between 1966 and 1968.

== Private life and death ==
Füri was born and brought up in Kleinbasel, a quarter of Basel on the right hand side of the Rhine. Füri married Verena Grass and the couple had two children, a daughter named Sandra and a son named Markus. Markus also became footballer and he too played for Basel, three seasons, between 1986 and 1989. Peter Füri was a qualified electrician and worked up until his retirement as head of department in the distribution center for Coop in Pratteln. He died on 11 May 2015 at his home in Muttenz due to heart failure.

== Honours and Titles ==
Concordia Basel

- Swiss 1. Liga champions and promoted: 1957

Basel

- Swiss Cup winner: 1963

== Sources ==
- Josef Zindel (2018). FC Basel 1893. Die ersten 125 Jahre (in German). Basel: Friedrich Reinhardt Verlag. ISBN 978-3-7245-2305-5.
- Verein "Basler Fussballarchiv" Homepage
