= Jiří Sobotka =

Czech football player and coach (1911–1994)

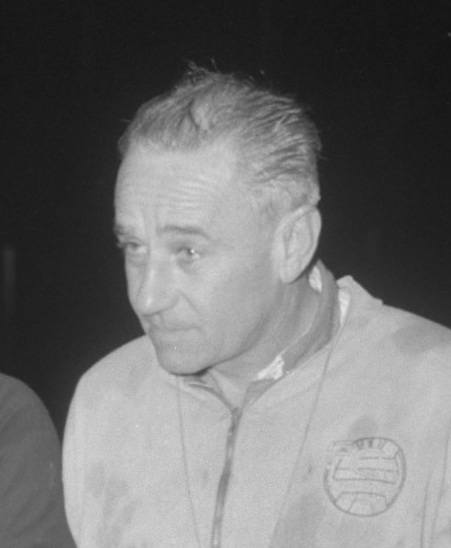
- Sobotka in 1961

Personal information
- Date of birth: 6 June 1911
- Place of birth: Prague, Austria-Hungary
- Date of death: 20 May 1994 (aged 82)
- Place of death: Intragna, Switzerland
- Position: Forward

Youth career
- Čechoslovan Košíře

Senior career*
Years	Team	Apps	(Gls)
1931–1939	Slavia Prague		
1939–1941	Hajduk Split	34	(17)
1942	Slavia Prague		
1943–1946	SK Baťa Zlín		
1946–1951	Chaux-de-Fonds		

International career
1934–1937	Czechoslovakia	23	(8)

Managerial career
- 1940–1941: Hajduk Split
- 1946–1959: Chaux-de-Fonds
- 1959–1961: Feyenoord
- 1961–1965: FC Basel
- 1964–1965: Switzerland
- 1965–1967: FC Biel-Bienne
- 1968–1969: Charleroi
- 1970–1971: UE Sant Andreu
- 1971–1972: Chaux-de-Fonds
- 1972–1973: FC Aarau
- 1973–1976: Bellinzona
Medal record
Representing Czechoslovakia
Men's Football
FIFA World Cup
Runner-up	1934 Italy
- * Club domestic league appearances and goals

Jiří Sobotka (also known as Georges Sobotka; 6 June 1911 – 20 May 1994) was a Czech football player and manager. He played internationally for Czechoslovakia.

== Career ==
Sobotka played for Czechoslovakia national football team (23 caps, 8 goals) and participated at the 1934 FIFA World Cup when Czechoslovakia came in second.

He played for Slavia Prague, Hajduk Split (winning the Banovina of Croatia first league) and FC La Chaux-de-Fonds.

During his period in Split, he played 36 league matches scoring 17 goals in the 1939-40 and 1940-41 seasons. Before arriving to Yugoslavia, he had been a player-coach in Switzerland with FC Winterthur.

After his playing career, he coached numerous clubs in Switzerland and won 6 Swiss cups. He also coached Charleroi in Belgium UE Sant Andreu in Spain, and Switzerland national team.

== Curiosity ==
A well-documented curiosity was that during the winter break of their 1963–64 season FC Basel travelled on a world tour. This saw them visit British Hong Kong, Malaysia, Singapore, Australia, New Zealand, French Polynesia, Mexico and the United States. As first team manager Sobotka was together with 16 players and 15 members of staff, supporters and journalists participated in this world tour from 10 January to 10 February 1964. Team captain Bruno Michaud filmed the events with his super-8 camara. The voyage around the world included 19 flights and numerous bus and train journeys. Club chairman, Lucien Schmidlin, led the group, but as they arrived in the hotel in Bangkok, he realised that 250,000 Swiss Francs were missing. The suitcase that he had filled with the various currencies was not with them. He had left it at home, but Swiss Air were able to deliver this to him within just a few days. During the tour a total of ten friendly/test games were played, these are listed in their 1963–64 season. Five wins, three draws, two defeats, but also three major injuries resulted from these test matches. A broken leg for Peter Füri, an eye injury for Walter Baumann and a knee injury for Bruno Michaud soon reduced the number of players to just 13.

== Honours ==
=== As a player ===
Slavia Prague

- Czechoslovak First League: 1932–33, 1933–34, 1934–35, 1936–37

Hajduk Split

- Croatian First League: 1940–41

Czechoslovakia

- FIFA World Cup runner-up: 1934

=== As a manager ===
Chaux-de-Fonds

- Swiss Championship: 1953–54, 1954–55
- Swiss Cup: 1947–48, 1950–51, (Note: Sobotka won the 1947–48 and 1950–51 Swiss Cups as a player-manager) 1953–54, 1954–55, 1956–57

Feyenoord

- Eredivisie: 1960–61

FC Basel

- Swiss Cup: 1962–63
