= 1961–62 in Swiss football =

Football in Switzerland
- Season: 1961–62

Men's football
- Nationalliga A: Servette
- Nationalliga B: Sion
- 1. Liga: 1. Liga champions: FC Moutier; Group West: Cantonal Neuchâtel; Group Cenral: FC Moutier; Group South and East: FC Baden
- Swiss Cup: Lausanne-Sport

The following is a summary of the 1961–62 season of competitive football in Switzerland.

== Nationalliga A ==
=== Final league table ===
Pos	Team	Pld	W	D	L	GF	GA	GD	Pts	Qualification or relegation
1	Servette	26	18	4	4	93	30	+63	40	Swiss Champions qualified for 1962–63 European Cup and entered 1962–63 Intertoto Cup
2	Lausanne-Sport	26	15	5	6	63	38	+25	35	Swiss Cup winners qualified for 1962–63 Cup Winners' Cup
3	La Chaux-de-Fonds	26	16	2	8	72	45	+27	34	Entered 1962–63 Intertoto Cup
4	Grasshopper Club	26	12	7	7	61	52	+9	31	
5	Young Boys	26	13	3	10	61	51	+10	29	Entered 1962–63 Intertoto Cup
6	Luzern	26	11	6	9	45	38	+7	28	
7	Basel	26	10	8	8	51	54	−3	28	Entered 1962–63 Intertoto Cup
8	Biel-Bienne	26	7	10	9	45	49	−4	24	
9	Zürich	26	8	6	12	53	57	−4	22	
10	Lugano	26	6	10	10	32	60	−28	22	
11	Grenchen	26	7	7	12	39	59	−20	21	
12	Young Fellows Zürich	26	7	6	13	53	63	−10	20	
13	Schaffhausen	26	6	7	13	40	65	−25	19	Relegated to 1962–63 Nationalliga B
14	Fribourg	26	2	7	17	33	80	−47	11	Relegated to 1962–63 Nationalliga B

Source: rsssf.com
Rules for classification: 1) Points; 2) Goal difference within the league, however with play-off for qualifiers;

== Nationalliga B ==
=== Final league table ===
Pos	Team	Pld	W	D	L	GF	GA	GD	Pts	Qualification or relegation
1	FC Sion	26	14	7	5	62	36	+26	35	To play-off for title
2	FC Chiasso	26	14	7	5	54	30	+24	35	To play-off for title
3	FC Winterthur	26	13	6	7	56	37	+19	32	
4	AC Bellinzona	26	11	7	8	56	46	+10	29	
5	Urania Genève Sport	26	11	5	10	52	48	+4	27	
6	FC Thun	26	10	7	9	50	47	+3	27	
7	FC Aarau	26	9	8	9	37	39	−2	26	
8	Vevey Sports	26	10	5	11	40	48	−8	25	
9	FC Porrentruy	26	10	5	11	38	51	−13	25	
10	SC Brühl	26	9	6	11	44	51	−7	24	
11	FC Bern	26	8	6	12	59	48	+11	22	
12	FC Bodio	26	6	10	10	38	47	−9	22	
13	FC Martigny-Sports	26	5	9	12	29	58	−29	19	Relegated to 1962–63 1. Liga
14	Yverdon-Sport FC	26	4	8	14	36	65	−29	16	Relegated to 1962–63 1. Liga

Source: rsssf.com
Rules for classification: 1) Points; 2) Goal difference within the league, however with play-off for qualifiers;

=== Play-off for title ===
Sion and Chiasso finished level on points in joint first position and had both achieved promotion to 1962–63 Nationalliga A. However, it required a play-off to decide the title as NLB champions.

Team 1	Score	Team 2
Chiasso	4–3 (a.e.t.)	Sion

Chiasso won the NLB championship.

== 1. Liga ==
=== Group West ===
Pos	Team	Pld	W	D	L	GF	GA	GD	BP	Pts	Qualification or relegation
1	FC Cantonal Neuchâtel	22	17	4	1	55	15	+40	0	38	Play-off to Nationalliga B
2	FC Le Locle	22	15	1	6	57	27	+30	0	31	
3	FC Xamax	22	14	3	5	66	40	+26	−8	23	* See note below
4	FC Monthey	22	11	1	10	60	44	+16	0	23	
5	Etoile Carouge FC	22	9	3	10	47	46	+1	0	21	
6	FC Sierre	22	9	2	11	34	48	−14	0	20	
7	FC Raron	22	7	5	10	38	44	−6	0	19	
8	FC Forward Morges	22	7	5	10	29	41	−12	0	19	
9	FC Versoix	22	8	1	13	32	45	−13	0	17	
10	FC Lengnau	22	7	3	12	27	47	−20	0	17	
11	ES FC Malley	22	5	5	12	22	43	−21	0	15	
12	FC Bözingen 34	22	5	3	14	35	62	−27	0	13	Relegation to 2. Liga

Source: RSSSF
Rules for classification: 1) Points; 2) Goal difference within the league, but decider play-off for qualifiers.
- Note: Xamax had 8 points deducted because they had been accused by former coach Vidjak of paying illegal bonuses to the players.

=== Group Central ===
Pos	Team	Pld	W	D	L	GF	GA	GD	Pts	Qualification or relegation
1	FC Moutier	22	13	6	3	52	32	+20	32	Play-off to Nationalliga B
2	SR Delémont	22	13	3	6	43	32	+11	29	
3	FC Nordstern Basel	22	9	8	5	31	17	+14	26	
4	FC Alle	22	11	4	7	48	35	+13	26	
5	FC Solothurn	22	7	10	5	27	25	+2	24	
6	FC Concordia Basel	22	8	6	8	48	39	+9	22	
7	FC Emmenbrücke	22	9	3	10	41	41	0	21	
8	SC Burgdorf	22	7	6	9	41	47	−6	20	
9	FC Wohlen	22	5	8	9	34	49	−15	18	
10	FC Langenthal	22	6	5	11	32	39	−7	17	
11	BSC Old Boys	22	4	8	10	23	40	−17	16	
12	FC Breitenbach	22	6	1	15	37	61	−24	13	Relegation to 2. Liga

Source: RSSSF
Rules for classification: 1) Points; 2) Goal difference within the league, but decider play-off for qualifiers.

=== Group South and East ===
Pos	Team	Pld	W	D	L	GF	GA	GD	Pts	Qualification or relegation
1	FC Baden	22	15	4	3	63	28	+35	34	Play-off to Nationalliga B
2	FC Dietikon	22	14	3	5	60	38	+22	31	
3	FC St. Gallen	22	14	2	6	56	36	+20	30	
4	FC Rapid Lugano	22	7	9	6	34	31	+3	23	
5	FC Red Star Zürich	22	10	2	10	53	40	+13	22	
6	FC Wettingen	22	9	4	9	42	40	+2	22	
7	FC Locarno	22	8	5	9	40	40	0	21	
8	FC Vaduz	22	8	5	9	44	50	−6	21	
9	FC Oerlikon/Polizei ZH	22	8	4	10	37	46	−9	20	
10	FC Blue Stars Zürich	22	7	4	11	42	54	−12	18	
11	FC Solduno	22	5	2	15	30	58	−28	12	
12	SV Höngg	22	4	2	16	24	64	−40	10	Relegation to 2. Liga

Source: RSSSF
Rules for classification: 1) Points; 2) Goal difference within the league, but decider play-off for qualifiers.

=== Promotion play-off ===
The three group winners played single a round-robin for the two promotion slots and for the championship.

==== Round-robin ====
Pos	Team	Pld	W	D	L	GF	GA	GD	Pts	MOU	CN	BAD
1	FC Moutier	2	2	0	0	3	1	+2	4	—	2–1	—
2	Cantonal Neuchâtel	2	1	0	1	4	3	+1	2	—	—	3–1
3	Baden	2	0	0	2	1	4	−3	0	0–1	—	—

Source: RSSSF
Rules for classification: 1) Points; 2) Head-to-head 3) Decider.

FC Moutier were declaired 1. Liga champions. The champions and the runners-up Cantonal Neuchâtel were promoted to 1962–63 Nationalliga B.

== Swiss Cup ==
The competition was played in a knockout system. In the case of a draw, extra time was played. If the teams were still level after extra time, the match was replayed at the away team's ground. In the replay, in case of a draw after extra time, a toss of the coin would decide which team progressed.

=== Early rounds ===
The routes of the finalists to the final were:

- Second round: teams from the NLA and NLB with byes.
- Third round: Versoix-Lausanne 0:11. Bellinzona-Emmenbrücke 3:1.
- Fourth round: Lausanne-Martigny 5:1. Luzern-Bellinzona 0:3.
- Fifth round: Lausanne-Alle 5:0. Solothurn-Bellinzona 1:1 (a.e.t.). Replay: Bellinzona-Solothurn 3:1.
- Quarter-finals: Lausanne-Servette 5:1. Bellinzona-Basel 1:0.
- Semi-finals: Lausanne-YB 1:1 (a.e.t.). Replay: YB-Lausanne 2:3. Bellinzona-La Chaux-de-Fonds 1:0.

=== Final ===
The final was held at the former Wankdorf Stadium on Easter Monday 1962.

23 April 1962
15:00

Lausanne-Sport	4–0 (a.e.t.)	Bellinzona
Hosp 93'; Glisovic 98'; Dürr 109' (pen.); Hosp 115'	Summary

Wankdorf Stadium, Bern
Attendance: 23,000
Referee: (Switzerland) Albert Guinnard (Gletterens)

== Swiss Clubs in Europe ==
- Servette as 1960–61 Nationalliga A champions: 1961–62 European Cup
- La Chaux-de-Fonds as 1960–61 Swiss Cup winners: 1961–62 Cup Winners' Cup and entered 1961–62 Intertoto Cup
- Zürich: entered 1961–62 Intertoto Cup
- Grenchen: entered 1961–62 Intertoto Cup
- Basel: entered 1961–62 Intertoto Cup

=== Servette ===
==== European Cup ====
===== Preliminary round =====
6 September 1961 First leg	Servette (Switzerland)	5–0	(Malta) Hibernians	Stade des Charmilles, Geneva
21:30 CET	Robbiani 3', 30'; Németh 20'; Georgy 57' (pen.), 70'	Report		Attendance: 14,739; Referee: Cesare Jonni (Italy)

20 September 1961 Second leg	Hibernians (Malta)	1–2	(Switzerland) Servette	Empire Stadium, Gżira
	Sultana 60'	Report	Wüthrich 42'; Robbiani 78'	Attendance: 4,853; Referee: Gennaro Marchese (Italy)

Servette won 7–1 on aggregate.

===== First round =====
5 November 1961 First leg	Servette (Switzerland)	4–3	(Czechoslovakia) Dukla Prague	Stade des Charmilles, Geneva
	Fatton 19', 67', 88'; Robbiani 84'	Report	Adamec 7', 50'; Vacenovský 37'	Attendance: 25,644; Referee: Gino Rigato (Italy)

22 November 1961 Second leg	Dukla Prague (Czechoslovakia)	2–0	(Switzerland) Servette	Stadion Juliska, rague
13:30 CET	Kučera 24', 27'	Report		Attendance: 9,585; Referee: Giuseppe Adami (Italy)

Dukla Prague won 5–4 on aggregate.

=== La Chaux-de-Fonds ===
==== Cup Winners' Cup ====
===== Preliminary round =====
7 September 1961 First leg	La Chaux-de-Fonds (Switzerland)	6–2	(Portugal) Leixões	Stade de la Charrière, La Chaux-de-Fonds
	Antenen 8'; Sommerlatt 25'; Bertschi 51', 67'; Jäger 52', 57'		Oliveirinha 42', 86'	Attendance: 3,194; Referee: Pierre Schwinte (France)

5 October 1961 Second leg	Leixões (Portugal)	5–0	(Switzerland) La Chaux-de-Fonds	Campo de Santana, Matosinhos
	Osvaldo Silva 24', 30'; Oliveirinha 46', 71'; Ventura 52'			Attendance: 3,747; Referee: Jean Tricot (France)

Leixões won 7–6 on aggregate.

==== Intertoto ====
===== Group =====
Pos	Team	Pld	W	D	L	GF	GA	GD	Pts	FEY	S04	GÖT	CDF
1	(Netherlands) Feyenoord (A)	6	5	0	1	24	12	+12	10	—	1–3	4–1	3–2
2	(West Germany) Schalke 04	6	4	0	2	22	12	+10	8	1–5	—	4–1	8–0
3	(Sweden) IFK Göteborg	6	1	1	4	12	22	−10	3	3–6	2–4	—	3–2
4	(Switzerland) La Chaux-de-Fonds	6	1	1	4	11	23	−12	3	2–5	3–2	2–2	—

Source: mogiel.net
Rules for classification: 1) Points; 2) Goal difference; 3) Goals scored; 4) Head-to-head points; 5) Draw.
(A) Advance to a further round

=== Zürich ===
==== Intertoto ====
===== Group B2 =====
Pos	Team	Pld	W	D	L	GF	GA	GD	Pts	Qualification	AJA	MAL	PIR	ZÜR
1	(Netherlands) Ajax	6	4	1	1	26	8	+18	9	Advanced to quarter-finals	—	1–0	9–1	9–1
2	(Sweden) Malmö FF	6	3	2	1	15	10	+5	8		1–1	—	4–2	4–1
3	(West Germany) Pirmasens	6	3	1	2	17	19	−2	7		4–2	3–3	—	5–0
4	(Switzerland) Zürich	6	0	0	6	6	27	−21	0		1–4	2–3	1–2	—

Source: mogiel.net
Rules for classification: 1) Points; 2) Goal difference; 3) Goals scored; 4) Head-to-head points; 5) Draw.

===== Matches =====
18 June 1961 Round 1	Zürich (Switzerland)	2–3	(Sweden) Malmö FF	Letzigrund, Zürich
	Waldner 9' (1:0); Feller 79' (2:3)	FCZ summary	25' (1:1) Wendt; 58' (1:2) Holmqvist; 67' (1:3) Wendt	Attendance: 3,000; Referee: (Austria) Fritz Seipelt
Note: Malmö, due to the international match envolving Denmark, with the substitute players Ahlberg and Ekenberg (Helsingborgs IF), Pedersson and Wendt (Örebro SK) and Holmqvist (Saltö BK).

25 June 1961 Round 2	Zürich (Switzerland)	1–2	(Germany) Pirmasens	Hardturm, Zürich
	Fäh (1:0)	FCZ summary	(1:1) Weishaar; 21' (1:2) Matischak	Attendance: 6,500; Referee: (Netherlands) H. Martens
Note: Pirmasens played in the Oberliga Südwest in 1961.

2 July 1961 Round 3	Ajax (Netherlands)	9–1	(Switzerland) Zürich	Olympisch Stadion, Amsterdam
	Groot 2' (1:0); Keizer 15' (2:0); Groot 20' (3:0); Keizer 50' (4:0); Keizer 55' (5:0); Feldmann 62' (6:0); Swart 75' (7:0); Groot 82' (8:0); Groot 85' (9:0)	FCZ summary	90' (9:1) Kuhn	Attendance: 6,500; Referee: (Sweden) Einar Boström
Note: The correct time of Kuhn's consolation goal remains unclear.

8 July 1961 Round 4	Zürich (Switzerland)	1–4	(Netherlands) Ajax	Hardturm, Zürich
	Waldner 44' (1:1)	FCZ summary	Petersen 34' (0:1); Petersen 65' (1:2); Groot 69' (1:3); Groot 85' (1:4)	Attendance: 1,200; Referee: (Germany) Albert Dusch

16 July 1961 Round 5	Pirmasens (Germany)	5–0	(Switzerland) Zürich	Stadion an der Zweibrücker Strasse, Pirmasens
	Hohmann 5' (1:0); Kapitulski 25' (2:0); Fritzsche (3:0); Kapitulski 67' (4:0); Kapitulski 87' (5:0)	FCZ summary		Attendance: 4,000; Referee: (Netherlands) La Croix

23 July 1961 Round 6	Malmö FF (Sweden)	4–1	(Switzerland) Zürich	Malmö Stadion, Malmö
	Gustafsson 44' (1:1); Gustafsson 47' (2:1); Granström 60' (3:1); Gustafsson 77' (4:1)	FCZ summary	18' (0:1) Zsámboki	Attendance: 3,700; Referee: (Netherlands) Bogert

=== Grenchen ===
==== Intertoto ====
===== Group B3 =====
Pos	Team	Pld	W	D	L	GF	GA	GD	Pts	ÖRG	VVV	NEU	GRE
1	(Sweden) Örgryte (A)	6	4	2	0	15	7	+8	10	—	2–1	3–1	2–2
2	(Netherlands) VVV-Venlo	6	3	1	2	13	12	+1	7	2–2	—	3–2	1–0
3	(West Germany) Borussia Neunkirchen	6	2	0	4	12	15	−3	4	1–3	5–3	—	2–0
4	(Switzerland) Grenchen	6	1	1	4	6	12	−6	3	0–3	1–3	3–1	—

Source: mogiel.net
Rules for classification: 1) Points; 2) Goal difference; 3) Goals scored; 4) Head-to-head points; 5) Draw.
(A) Advance to a further round

=== Basel ===
==== Intertoto ====
===== Group B4 =====
Pos	Team	Pld	W	D	L	GF	GA	GD	Pts	SPA	ELF	TAS	BAS
1	(Netherlands) Sparta Rotterdam (A)	6	5	0	1	23	12	+11	10	—	4–3	4–1	5–2
2	(Sweden) Elfsborg	6	4	0	2	21	17	+4	8	2–5	—	5–2	2–1
3	(West Germany) Tasmania Berlin	6	1	1	4	11	16	−5	3	4–1	2–3	—	1–2
4	(Switzerland) Basel	6	1	1	4	9	19	−10	3	0–4	3–6	1–1	—

Source: mogiel.net
Rules for classification: 1) Points; 2) Goal difference; 3) Goals scored; 4) Head-to-head points; 5) Draw.
(A) Advance to a further round

===== Matches =====
17 June 1961 Round 1	Basel (Switzerland)	0 – 4	(Netherlands) Sparta Rotterdam	Landhof, Basel
18:00		Summary	(2x) van Miert (1x) de Vries (1x) Janssen	Attendance: 3,500; Referee: (Austria) Carl Erich Steiner Wien

25 June 1961 Round 2	Elfsborg (Sweden)	2 – 1	(Switzerland) Basel	Ryavallen, Borås, Sweden
	Raaberg (1x); Larsson (1x)	Summary	(1x) Hügi (II)	Attendance: 3,300; Referee: (Germany) Johannes Malka Herten

2 July 1961 Round 3	Tasmania Berlin (West Germany)	1 – 2	(Switzerland) Basel	Poststadion, Berlin
	Rosenfeldt 7' (1:0)	Summary	35' (1:1) Hügi (II); 46' (1:2) Stocker	Attendance: 2,500; Referee: (Sweden) Johanesson

8 July 1961 Round 4	Basel (Switzerland)	1 – 1	(West Germany) Tasmania Berlin	Landhof, Basel
18:30	Speidel (1x)	Summary	(1x o.g.)	Attendance: 3,000; Referee: (Austria) Friedrich Seipelt

15 July 1961 Round 5	Basel (Switzerland)	3 – 6	(Sweden) Elfsborg	Landhof, Basel
18:30	Hügi (II) (1x); Von Krannichfeldt (1x); Walther (1x)	Summary	(3x) Larsson (2x) Raberg (1x) Bartholdsson	Attendance: 2,800; Referee: (Austria) Friedrich Mayer

23 July 1961 Round 6	Sparta Rotterdam (Netherlands)	5 – 2	(Switzerland) Basel	Rotterdam
	Van Buuren 3' (1:1); De Vries 19' (2:1); Verhoeven 49' (3:2); Bosselaar 58' (4:2); Jansen 76' (5:2)	Summary	2' (0:1) Hügi (II); 31' (2:2) Burri	Attendance: 12,000; Referee: (Sweden) Gösta Ackerborn

== Sources ==
- Switzerland 1961–62 at RSSSF
- European Competitions 1961–62 at RSSSF.com
- Cup finals at Fussball-Schweiz
- Intertoto history at Pawel Mogielnicki's Page
- Josef Zindel (2018). FC Basel 1893. Die ersten 125 Jahre (in German). Basel: Friedrich Reinhardt Verlag. ISBN 978-3-7245-2305-5.

Preceded by 1960–61	Seasons in Swiss football	Succeeded by 1962–63
