= 1960–61 Nationalliga A =

Swiss football season

Nationalliga A
- Season: 1960–61
- Champions: Servette
- Relegated: Winterthur; Chiasso
- Top goalscorer: Giuliano Robbiani (GC); 27 goals

Nationalliga B
- Season: 1960–61
- Champions: Lugano
- Promoted: Lugano; Schaffhausen
- Relegated: Cantonal; Nordstern
- Top goalscorer: Vittore Gottardi (Lugano); 26 goals

The following is the summary of the Swiss National League in the 1960–61 football season, both Nationalliga A and Nationalliga B. This was the 64th season of top-tier and the 63rd season of second-tier football in Switzerland.

== Overview ==
The Swiss Football Association (ASF/SFV) had 28 member clubs at this time which were divided into two divisions of 14 teams each. The teams played a double round-robin to decide their table positions. Two points were awarded for a win and one point was awarded for a draw. The top tier (NLA) was contested by the top 12 teams from the previous 1959–60 season and the two newly promoted teams Young Fellows Zürich and FC Fribourg. The champions would qualify for the 1962–63 European Cup and the last two teams in the league table at the end of the season were to be relegated.

The second-tier (NLB) was contested by the two teams that had been relegated from the NLA at the end of the last season, Lugano and Bellinzona, the ten teams that had been in third to twelfth position last season and the two newly promoted teams Martigny-Sports and Nordstern. The top two teams at the end of the season would be promoted to the 1961–62 NLA and the two last placed teams would be relegated to the 1961–62 Swiss 1. Liga.

The Swiss champions received a slot in the 1961–62 European Cup and the Swiss Cup winners received a slot in the 1961–62 Cup Winners' Cup. The following summer would see the start of the International Football Cup. The initial rounds would see a group stage and this would take place as a pre-season event. The knock-out stage would then be played during the season. The ASF/SFV were allocated four starting places. These would be given to the four best placed teams in this season. However, if a club was not interested in contesting the slot would be passed down to the next willing club.

== Nationalliga A ==
=== Teams, locations ===
Team	Based in	Canton	Stadium	Capacity
FC Basel	Basel	Basel-Stadt	Landhof	4,000
FC Biel-Bienne	Biel/Bienne	Bern	Stadion Gurzelen	5,500
FC Chiasso	Chiasso	Ticino	Stadio Comunale Riva IV	4,000
FC Fribourg	Fribourg	Fribourg	Stade Universitaire	9,000
Grasshopper Club Zürich	Zürich	Zürich	Hardturm	20,000
FC Grenchen	Grenchen	Solothurn	Stadium Brühl	10,900
FC La Chaux-de-Fonds	La Chaux-de-Fonds	Neuchâtel	Centre Sportif de la Charrière	10,000
FC Lausanne-Sport	Lausanne	Vaud	Pontaise	30,000
FC Luzern	Lucerne	Lucerne	Stadion Allmend	25,000
Servette FC	Geneva	Geneva	Stade des Charmilles	27,000
FC Winterthur	Winterthur	Zürich	Schützenwiese	8,550
BSC Young Boys	Bern	Bern	Wankdorf Stadium	56,000
FC Young Fellows	Zürich	Zürich	Utogrund	2,850
FC Zürich	Zürich	Zürich	Letzigrund	25,000

=== Final league table ===
Pos	Team	Pld	W	D	L	GF	GA	GD	Pts	Qualification
1	Servette	26	23	0	3	77	29	+48	46	Swiss Champions qualified for 1961–62 European Cup
2	Young Boys	26	15	6	5	70	37	+33	36	
3	Zürich	26	15	5	6	74	43	+31	35	Entered 1961–62 International Football Cup
4	Grenchen	26	12	6	8	68	49	+19	30	Entered 1961–62 International Football Cup
5	Basel	26	13	2	11	42	36	+6	28	Entered 1961–62 Inter-Cities Fairs Cup
6	Grasshopper Club	26	10	6	10	60	53	+7	26	
7	La Chaux-de-Fonds	26	11	4	11	65	64	+1	26	Swiss Cup winners qualified for 1961–62 Cup Winners' Cup and entered 1961–62 International Football Cup
8	Luzern	26	9	6	11	37	45	−8	24	
9	Lausanne-Sport	26	9	5	12	57	58	−1	23	Entered 1961–62 Inter-Cities Fairs Cup
10	Biel-Bienne	26	8	7	11	43	47	−4	23	
11	Young Fellows Zürich	26	8	6	12	48	63	−15	22	
12	Fribourg	26	7	6	13	30	55	−25	20	
13	Winterthur	26	8	1	17	33	66	−33	17	Relegated to 1961–62 Nationalliga B
14	Chiasso	26	2	4	20	22	81	−59	8	Relegated to 1961–62 Nationalliga B

Source: rsssf.com
Rules for classification: 1) Points; 2) Goal difference within the league, however with play-off for qualifiers;

=== Results ===
Home \ Away	BAS	BB	CDF	CHI	FRI	GCZ	GRE	LS	LUZ	SER	WIN	YB	YFZ	ZÜR
Basel		4–0	3–2	3–1	3–0	2–0	1–1	2–0	0–1	0–1	1–4	2–0	1–5	2–4
Biel-Bienne	0–1		1–1	3–2	5–0	4–3	3–2	2–1	1–2	0–2	5–2	2–1	1–1	1–3
La Chaux-de-Fonds	2–3	2–2		5–2	1–0	3–2	5–1	3–2	5–2	0–2	4–0	2–4	2–2	6–4
Chiasso	1–0	0–4	2–0		0–0	0–2	0–5	1–1	3–3	1–3	1–3	1–2	0–3	1–1
Fribourg	1–0	0–0	3–2	2–0		1–1	0–1	4–4	0–0	1–4	4–0	2–5	0–4	2–0
Grasshopper Club	2–4	2–1	1–5	6–3	0–2		5–2	0–0	4–1	3–1	3–0	4–4	1–1	4–0
Grenchen	1–2	2–0	4–4	5–1	2–2	4–0		3–2	2–4	3–5	4–1	1–1	4–1	2–2
Lausanne-Sports	3–1	1–1	4–2	6–0	3–1	2–6	0–6		2–0	1–3	3–0	3–2	6–0	3–3
Luzern	0–1	2–1	2–1	4–0	3–1	0–3	0–0	2–4		0–1	1–0	1–1	2–2	1–1
Servette	4–2	2–0	4–0	4–0	2–0	5–2	4–3	5–1	1–0		3–1	1–3	7–0	4–2
Winterthur	0–4	2–0	0–1	1–0	3–2	5–5	1–3	2–1	2–0	0–2		0–6	3–2	1–3
Young Boys	0–0	3–3	3–1	3–0	9–1	1–0	3–2	3–1	3–0	4–0	2–0		1–1	1–3
Young Fellows	1–0	4–1	3–5	5–2	0–1	0–0	2–0	3–1	2–5	1–4	3–1	2–4		2–4
Zürich	2–0	2–2	8–1	7–0	3–0	2–1	1–2	3–2	3–0	1–3	3–1	3–0	6–1	

Source: rsssf.com
Legend: Blue = home team win; Yellow = draw; Red = away team win.

=== Topscorers ===
Rank	Player	Nat.	Goals	Club
1.	Giuliano Robbiani	(Switzerland)	27	Grasshopper Club
2.	Eugen Meier	(Switzerland)	26	Young Boys
2.	Erwin Waldner	(Germany)	26	Zürich
4.	René Hamel	(Switzerland)	23	Grenchen
5.	Ernst Wechselberger	(Germany)	20	Young Boys
6.	Bruno Brizzi	(Switzerland)	19	Zürich
7.	Josef Hügi	(Switzerland)	17	Basel
8.	Josef "Jupp" Derwall	(Germany)	16	Biel-Bienne
8.	Miodrag Glisovic	(Socialist Federal Republic of Yugoslavia)	16	Grenchen
8.	Walter Heuri	(Switzerland)	16	Servette

== Nationalliga B ==
=== Teams, locations ===
Team	Based in	Canton	Stadium	Capacity
FC Aarau	Aarau	Aargau	Stadion Brügglifeld	9,240
AC Bellinzona	Bellinzona	Ticino	Stadio Comunale Bellinzona	5,000
FC Bern	Bern	Bern	Stadion Neufeld	14,000
SC Brühl	St. Gallen	St. Gallen	Paul-Grüninger-Stadion	4,200
FC Cantonal Neuchâtel	Neuchâtel	Neuchâtel	Stade de la Maladière	25,500
FC Lugano	Lugano	Ticino	Cornaredo Stadium	6,330
FC Martigny-Sports	Martigny	Valais	Stade d'Octodure	2,500
FC Nordstern Basel	Basel	Basel-Stadt	Rankhof	7,600
FC Schaffhausen	Schaffhausen	Schaffhausen	Stadion Breite	7,300
FC Sion	Sion	Valais	Stade de Tourbillon	16,000
FC Thun	Thun	Bern	Stadion Lachen	10,350
Urania Genève Sport	Genève	Geneva	Stade de Frontenex	4,000
Vevey Sports	Vevey	Vaud	Stade de Copet	4,000
Yverdon-Sport FC	Yverdon-les-Bains	Vaud	Stade Municipal	6,600

=== Final league table ===
Pos	Team	Pld	W	D	L	GF	GA	GD	Pts	Qualification or relegation
1	FC Lugano	26	16	6	4	77	36	+41	38	NLB Champions and promoted to 1961–62 Nationalliga A
2	FC Schaffhausen	26	16	4	6	55	29	+26	36	Play off for second position
3	AC Bellinzona	26	14	8	4	52	30	+22	36	Play off for second position
4	Yverdon-Sport FC	26	17	1	8	51	37	+14	35	
5	FC Thun	26	13	6	7	62	36	+26	32	
6	FC Sion	26	11	5	10	51	51	0	27	
7	FC Bern	26	9	7	10	55	59	−4	25	
8	FC Martigny-Sports	26	7	10	9	36	48	−12	24	
9	SC Brühl	26	8	5	13	46	50	−4	21	
10	Vevey Sports	26	8	5	13	28	41	−13	21	
11	FC Aarau	26	7	7	12	32	53	−21	21	
12	Urania Genève Sport	26	7	6	13	39	47	−8	20	
13	FC Cantonal Neuchâtel	26	6	5	15	44	72	−28	17	Relegated to 1961–62 1. Liga
14	FC Nordstern Basel	26	5	1	20	27	66	−39	11	Relegated to 1961–62 1. Liga

Source: rsssf.com
Rules for classification: 1) Points; 2) Goal difference within the league, however with play-off for qualifiers;

=== Decider for second place ===
Schaffhausen and Bellinzona ended the season level on points, therefore a play-off for promotion was required. The decider match for second place was played on 18 June 1961 at the Stadion Neufeld in Bern.

Team 1	Score	Team 2
Schaffhausen	2–0 *	Bellinzona

* Note: The match was abandoned due to pitch invasion in the 68th Minute.

The replay was played on 23 July at Stadion Allmend in Lucerne.

Team 1	Score	Team 2
Schaffhausen	4–0	Bellinzona

Schaffhausen won and were promoted to 1961–62 Nationalliga A. Bellinzona remained in the division.

== Further in Swiss football ==
- 1960–61 Swiss Cup
- 1960–61 Swiss 1. Liga

== Sources ==
- Switzerland 1960–61 at RSSSF

Preceded by 1959–60	Nationalliga seasons in Switzerland	Succeeded by 1961–62
