= 1961–62 Swiss Cup =

Tournament details
- Country: Switzerland

Final positions
- Champions: Lausanne-Sport
- Runners-up: Bellinzona

The 1961–62 Swiss Cup was the 37th season of Switzerland's football cup competition, organised annually since 1925–26 by the Swiss Football Association.

== Overview ==
This season's cup competition began with the games of the first round, played on the week-end of the 9 and 10 September 1961. The competition was completed on Easter Monday 23 April 1962, with the final, which was traditionally held at the former Wankdorf Stadium in Bern. The clubs from the 1961–62 Swiss 1. Liga were given a bye for the first round, they played in the second round on the week-end of 23 and 24 September. The clubs from this season's Nationalliga A (NLA) and from this season's Nationalliga B (NLB) were given byes for the first two rounds. These teams joined the competition in the third round, which was played on the week-end of 21 and 22 of October.

The matches were played in a knockout format. In the event of a draw after 90 minutes, the match went into extra time. In the event of a draw at the end of extra time, a replay was foreseen and this was played on the visiting team's pitch. If the replay ended in a draw after extra time, a toss of a coin would establish the team qualified for the next round. The cup winners qualified themselves for the first round of the Cup Winners' Cup in the next season.

== Round 1 ==
In the first phase, the lower league teams that had qualified themselves for the competition through their regional football association's regional cup competitions or their association's requirements, competed here. Whenever possible, the draw respected local regionalities. The first round was played on the weekend of 9 and 10 September 1961.

=== Summary ===
==== Region Ostschweiz ====
Team 1	Score	Team 2
9 and 10 September 1961
Chur	5–2	FC Sargans
FC Flawil	2–0	FC Wattwil
FC Bürglen	2–0	Kreuzlingen
FC Fortuna St.Gallen	1–1 (a.e.t.)	FC Rorschach

Replay

Team 1	Score	Team 2
17 September 1961
FC Rorschach	4–2	FC Fortuna St.Gallen

==== Region Zürich ====
Team 1	Score	Team 2
9 and 10 September 1961
FC Glattbrugg	1–4	Industrie Zürich
FC Adliswil	1–6	FC Turicum (ZH)
FC Oerlikon (ZH)	2–0	SC Veltheim
FC Schwammendingen	2–6	FC Unterstrass (ZH)
FC Phönix Winterthur	3–3	Svgg Schaffhausen
FC Wetzikon	7–1	FC Näfels

Replay

Team 1	Score	Team 2
17 September 1961
Svgg Schaffhausen	3–1	FC Phönix Winterthur

==== Region Bern ====
Team 1	Score	Team 2
9 and 10 September 1961
FC Aarberg	1–2 (a.e.t.)	FC Morat
FC Glovelier	0–5	FC Reconvilier
US Bienne-Boujean	3–0	FC Aegerten-Brügg
FC Ostermundigen	2–3	FC Victoria Bern
FC Lerchenfeld	3–2	FC Spiez
FC Kirchberg (BE)	0–2	FC Gerlafingen

==== Region Solothurn ====
Team 1	Score	Team 2
9 and 10 September 1961
Wangen bei Olten	0–2	FC Trimbach

==== Region Nordwestschweiz ====
Team 1	Score	Team 2
9 and 10 September 1961
FC Binningen	0–0 (a.e.t.)	FC Therwil
FC Birsfelden	8–3	FC Möhlin-Riburg
FC Breite Basel	4–3	Black Stars

Replay

Team 1	Score	Team 2
17 September 1961
FC Therwil	4–2	FC Binningen

==== Region Aargau ====
Team 1	Score	Team 2
9 and 10 September 1961
FC Brugg	2–1	FC Turgi
FC Gränichen	1–2	Zofingen

==== Region Innerschweiz ====
Team 1	Score	Team 2
9 and 10 September 1961
Buochs	1–2	Kickers Luzern
SC Zug	7–0	FC Perlen
FC Altdorf	3–1 (a.e.t.)	SC Goldau

==== Region Ticino ====
Team 1	Score	Team 2
9 and 10 September 1961
FC Verbano	2–2 (a.e.t.)	FC Preonzo
FC Stabio	0–4	Mendrisio

Replay

Team 1	Score	Team 2
17 September 1961
FC Preonzo	2–0	FC Verbano

==== Region Romande ====
Team 1	Score	Team 2
9 and 10 September 1961
Lancy-Sports	2–3	FC Geneva (GE)
Stade Nyonnais	2–3	Signal FC (Bernex)
FC Bussigny	1–7	FC Vallorbe
Concordia Lausanne	0–1	FC Chailly/Lausanne
Montreux-Sports	8–0	FC Muraz
FC Domdidier	2–1	Central Fribourg
Ticino Le Locle	2–4	FC Fontainemelon

== Round 2 ==
The clubs from the 1961–62 Swiss 1. Liga were given a bye for the first round, they now joined the competition here, in the second round.

=== Summary ===
Team 1	Score	Team 2
23 and 24 September 1961
Vaduz	4–2	Industrie Zürich
SV Höngg	6–2	FC Bürglen
FC Oerlikon	1–8 (a.e.t.)	Locarno
FC Turicum (ZH)	2–0	FC Dietikon
Baden	5–2	FC Unterstrass (ZH)
FC Wetzikon	2–3	St. Gallen
Svgg Schaffhausen	2–1	Red Star
Alle	6–1	FC Lerchenfeld
FC Bözingen 34	4–0	FC Reconvilier
Delémont	4–3	US Bienne-Boujean
Burgdorf	3–1	Zofingen
FC Langenthal	4–6	FC Flawil
Lengnau	2–6	FC Trimbach
FC Morat	2–10	Moutier
FC Victoria Bern	3–7	Le Locle-Sports
FC Gerlafingen	2–0	Neuchâtel Xamax
FC Birsfelden	1–3	Solothurn
Old Boys	2–2 (a.e.t.)	FC Selzbach
Nordstern	0–1	FC Breite Basel
FC Therwil	1–8	Concordia
FC Brugg	1–2	FC Breitenbach
Wohlen	5–3 (a.e.t.)	FC Chur
Wettingen	6–1	FC Rorschach
FC Altdorf	1–0 (a.e.t.)	FC Solduno
Kickers Luzern	2–2	Blue Stars
SC Zug	0–3	Emmenbrücke
Mendrisiostar	3–1	Polizei Zürich
FC Preonzo	0–3	FC Rapid Lugano
Monthey	0–1	Le Mont
FC Domdidier	0–4	FC Versoix
FC Vallorbe	1–3	FC Raron
FC Chailly/Lausanne	1–3	FC Forward Morges
FC Geneva GE	1–6	Etoile Carouge
ES Malley	2–5	Montreux-Sports
FC Sierre	2–1	Signal FC (Bernex)
FC Fontainemelon	4–6 (a.e.t.)	Cantonal Neuchâtel

Replays

Team 1	Score	Team 2
15 October 1961
FC Selzbach	2–1	Old Boys
Blue Stars	1–1	Kickers Luzern (t)

(t): Kickers Luzern qualified on toss of a coin

== Round 3 ==
The teams from the NLA and NLB entered the cup competition in this round. However, the teams from the NLA were seeded and could not be drawn against each other. Whenever possible, the draw respected local regionalities. The third round was played on the week-end of 21 and 22 of October.

=== Summary ===
Team 1	Score	Team 2
21 October 1961
FC Versoix	0–11	Lausanne-Sport
22 October 1961
FC Breitenbach	2–5	Young Boys
Sion	3–0	Le Mont
Martigny-Sports	2–1	Le Locle-Sports
FC Gerlafingen	2–4	FC Porrentruy
Alle	3–2	Biel-Bienne
Thun	2–1	Moutier
Grenchen	2–4	Solothurn
Luzern	8–1	Altdorf
Bellinzona	3–1	Emmenbrücke
Fribourg	5–0	FC Bözingen 34
La Chaux-de-Fonds	5–0	FC Selzbach
Wettingen	2–3	Brühl
Schaffhausen	6–2	Flawil
Urania Genève Sport	1–2	Cantonal Neuchâtel
FC Forward Morges	1–3	Servette
Aarau	2–3	Baden
SV Höngg	0–1	Young Fellows
FC Turicum (ZH)	1–6	Chiasso
St. Gallen	1–2	Grasshopper Club
FC Rapid Lugano	1–3	Lugano
Vevey Sports	4–0	Etoile Carouge
Montreux-Sports	2–1	Yverdon-Sport
FC Trimbach	1–4	Winterthur
Kickers Luzern	2–2 (a.e.t.)	Bodio
Vaduz	1–2	Zürich
Basel	3–2	Delémont
Concordia	1–2	FC Breite
Svgg Schaffhausen	1–3 (a.e.t.)	Wohlen
FC Sierre	2–1	FC Raron
Mendrisiostar	0–1	Locarno
Bern	3–3 (a.e.t.)	Burgdorf

Replays

Team 1	Score	Team 2
29 October 1961
Bodio	0–1	Kickers Luzern
5 November 1961
Burgdorf	8–6	Bern

=== Matches ===
22 October 1961

FC Forward Morges	1–3	Servette
Goal	Servette summary	Heuri; Robbiani; Desbiolles

Parc des Sports, Morges

22 October 1961

Aarau	2–3	Baden
Goal	FCA summary	Goal

Stadion Brügglifeld, Aarau

22 October 1961

Vaduz	1–2	Zürich
R. Müller 90' (pen.)	FCZ summary	65' (0:1) Martinelli; 75' (0:2) Brizzi

Landessportplatz, Vaduz
Attendance: 2,800
Referee: (Switzerland) Gottfried Dienst (Basel)

22 October 1961
14:30

Basel	3–2 (a.e.t.)	Delémont
Hügi (II) 47' (1:2); Von Krannichfeldt 62' (2:2); Blumer 101' (3:2)	FCB summary	13' (0:1) Gassmann; 27' (o.g. 0:2) Weber

Landhof, Basel
Attendance: 2,800
Referee: (Switzerland) Anton Bucheli (Luzern)

5 November 1961
Replay

Burgdorf	8–6	Bern
1x Dysli; 2x Kräuchi; 1x Rothenbühler; 1x Studer; 1x Kamondy; 2x Fuchs (o.g.)	RSSSF summary	2x Geiser; 1x Mosimann; 1x Allenbach; 1x Schmutz; 1x Sehrt

Wankdorf Stadium, Bern

== Round 4 ==
=== Summary ===
Team 1	Score	Team 2
12 November 1961
Vevey Sports	0–1	Montreux-Sports
19 November 1961
Baden	3–1 (a.e.t.)	Burgdorf
FC Porrentruy	1–2	Alle
Winterthur	3–1	Locarno
Kickers Luzern	1–3	Zürich
Basel	3–0	FC Breite
Thun	1–3 (a.e.t.)	Solothurn
FC Sierre	0–2	Sion
29 November 1961
Lausanne-Sport	5–1	Martigny-Sports
20 December 1961
Cantonal Neuchâtel	0–2	Servette
23 December 1961
Wohlen	0–1	Young Boys
Luzern	0–3	Bellinzona
Fribourg	0–4	La Chaux-de-Fonds
Young Fellows	3–0	Chiasso
Grasshopper Club	2–1	Lugano
Brühl	1–2 (a.e.t.)	Schaffhausen

=== Matches ===
19 November 1961

Kickers Luzern	1–3	Zürich
Tamburini 54' (1:1)	FCZ summary	15' (0:1) Klumpp; 65' (1:2) Kuhn; 67' (1:3) Brizzi

Stadion Allmend, Lucerne
Attendance: 5,000
Referee: (Switzerland) Albert Weber (Lausanne)

19 November 1961
14:30

Basel	3–0	FC Breite
Hügi (II) 55' (1:0); Pfirter 78' (2:0); Hügi (II) 80' (3:0)	Summary

Landhof, Basel
Attendance: 3,000
Referee: (Switzerland) André Ceretti Biel/Bienne

20 December 1961

Cantonal Neuchâtel	0–2	Servette
	Servette summary	(0:1) Mantula (0:2) Bosson

Stade de la Maladière, Neuchâtel

== Round 5 ==
=== Summary ===
Team 1	Score	Team 2
14 January 1962
Young Boys	9–0	Sion
Lausanne-Sport	5–0	Alle
La Chaux-de-Fonds	1–0	Schaffhausen
Servette	7–1 (a.e.t.)	Baden
Young Fellows	1–2	Grasshopper Club
Montreux-Sports	2–7	Winterthur
Zürich	0–1	Basel
Solothurn	ppd	Bellinzona

Replay

Team 1	Score	Team 2
14 January 1962
Bellinzona	3–1	Solothurn

=== Matches ===
14 January 1962

Zürich	0–1	Basel
	FCB summary FCZ summary	88' (o.g.) Battistella

Letzigrund, Zürich
Attendance: 5,000
Referee: (Switzerland) Othmar Huber (Thun)

14 January 1962

Servette	7–1 (a.e.t.)	Baden
3x Wüthrich; 1x Bosson; 1x Fatton; 2x Makay	Servette summary	Goal

Stade des Charmilles, Geneva

== Quarter-finals ==
=== Summary ===
Team 1	Score	Team 2
18 February 1962
Young Boys	6–1	Winterthur
Lausanne-Sport	5–1	Servette
Bellinzona	1–0	Basel
Grasshopper Club	2–4	La Chaux-de-Fonds

=== Matches ===
18 February 1962

Lausanne-Sport	5–1	Servette
Goal	Servette summary	Pázmándy

Pontaise, Lausanne

18 February 1962

Bellinzona	1–0	Basel
Buzzin 75' (1:0)	FCB summary

Stadio Comunale, Bellinzona
Attendance: 1,000
Referee: (Switzerland) Fritz Schorer (Interlaken)

== Semi-finals ==
=== Summary ===
Team 1	Score	Team 2
25 March 1962
Lausanne-Sport	1–1	Young Boys
Bellinzona	1–0	La Chaux-de-Fonds

Replay

Team 1	Score	Team 2
11 April 1962
Young Boys	2–3	Lausanne-Sport

=== Matches ===
25 March 1962

Lausanne-Sport	1–1	Young Boys
Bichler 61' (1:0)	summary	76' (1:1) Armbruster

Pontaise, Lausanne

11 April 1962
Replay

Young Boys	2–3	Lausanne-Sport
Wechselberger 15' (1:0); Schneiter 54' (2:2)	summary	33' (1:1) Glisovic; 49' (1:2) Glisovic; 83' (2:3) Vonlanthen

Wankdorf Stadium, Bern

25 March 1962

Bellinzona	1–0	La Chaux-de-Fonds
Pellanda 74' (1:0)	summary

Stadio Comunale Bellinzona, Bellinzona

== Final ==
The final was held at the former Wankdorf Stadium in Bern on Easter Monday 1962.

=== Summary ===
Team 1	Score	Team 2
23 April 1962
Lausanne-Sport	4–0	Bellinzona

=== Telegram ===
23 April 1962

Lausanne-Sport	4–0 (a.e.t.)	Bellinzona
Hosp 93' (1:0); Glisovic 98' (2:0); Dürr 109' (pen.); Hosp 115' (4:0)	Fussball-Schweiz summary

Wankdorf Stadium, Bern
Attendance: 23,000
Referee: (Switzerland) Albert Guinnard (Gletterens)

Lausanne-Sport won the cup and this was the club's fifth cup title to this date.

== Further in Swiss football ==
- 1961–62 Nationalliga A
- 1961–62 Swiss 1. Liga

== Sources ==
- Fussball-Schweiz
- FCB Cup games 1961–62 at fcb-achiv.ch
- Switzerland 1961–62 at RSSSF

Preceded by 1960–61	Swiss Cup seasons	Succeeded by 1962–63
