= 1961–62 Nationalliga A =

Swiss football season

Nationalliga A
- Season: 1961–62
- Champions: Servette
- Relegated: Schaffhausen; Fribourg
- Top goalscorer: Jacques Fatton (Servette); 25 goals

Nationalliga B
- Season: 1961–62
- Champions: Chiasso
- Promoted: Chiasso; Sion
- Relegated: Martigny-Sports; Yverdon-Sport
- Top goalscorer: Francis Anker (Sion); 23 goals

The following is the summary of the Swiss National League in the 1961–62 football season, both Nationalliga A and Nationalliga B. This was the 65th season of top-tier and the 64th season of second-tier football in Switzerland.

== Overview ==
The Swiss Football Association (ASF/SFV) had 28 member clubs at this time which were divided into two divisions of 14 teams each. The teams played a double round-robin to decide their table positions. Two points were awarded for a win and one point was awarded for a draw. The top tier (NLA) was contested by the top 12 teams from the previous 1960–61 season and the two newly promoted teams FC Lugano and FC Schaffhausen. The champions would qualify for the 1962–63 European Cup and the last two teams in the league table at the end of the season were to be relegated.

The second-tier (NLB) was contested by the two teams that had been relegated from the NLA at the end of the last season, FC Winterthur and FC Chiasso, the ten teams that had been in third to twelfth position last season and the two newly promoted teams FC Porrentruy and FC Bodio. The top two teams at the end of the season would be promoted to the 1962–63 NLA and the two last placed teams would be relegated to the 1962–63 Swiss 1. Liga.

The Swiss champions received a slot in the 1962–63 European Cup and the Cup winners received a slot in the 1962–63 Cup Winners' Cup.

== Nationalliga A ==
=== Teams, locations ===
Team	Based in	Canton	Stadium	Capacity
FC Basel	Basel	Basel-Stadt	Landhof	4,000
FC Biel-Bienne	Biel/Bienne	Bern	Stadion Gurzelen	5,500
FC Fribourg	Fribourg	Fribourg	Stade Universitaire	9,000
Grasshopper Club Zürich	Zürich	Zürich	Hardturm	20,000
FC Grenchen	Grenchen	Solothurn	Stadium Brühl	10,900
FC La Chaux-de-Fonds	La Chaux-de-Fonds	Neuchâtel	Centre Sportif de la Charrière	10,000
FC Lausanne-Sport	Lausanne	Vaud	Pontaise	30,000
FC Lugano	Lugano	Ticino	Cornaredo Stadium	6,330
FC Luzern	Lucerne	Lucerne	Stadion Allmend	25,000
FC Schaffhausen	Schaffhausen	Schaffhausen	Stadion Breite	7,300
Servette FC	Geneva	Geneva	Stade des Charmilles	27,000
BSC Young Boys	Bern	Bern	Wankdorf Stadium	56,000
FC Young Fellows	Zürich	Zürich	Utogrund	2,850
FC Zürich	Zürich	Zürich	Letzigrund	25,000

=== Final league table ===
Pos	Team	Pld	W	D	L	GF	GA	GD	Pts	Qualification or relegation
1	Servette	26	18	4	4	93	30	+63	40	Swiss Champions qualified for 1962–63 European Cup and entered 1962–63 Intertoto Cup
2	Lausanne-Sport	26	15	5	6	63	38	+25	35	Swiss Cup winners qualified for 1962–63 Cup Winners' Cup
3	La Chaux-de-Fonds	26	16	2	8	72	45	+27	34	Entered 1962–63 Intertoto Cup
4	Grasshopper Club	26	12	7	7	61	52	+9	31	
5	Young Boys	26	13	3	10	61	51	+10	29	Entered 1962–63 Intertoto Cup
6	Luzern	26	11	6	9	45	38	+7	28	
7	Basel	26	10	8	8	51	54	−3	28	Entered 1962–63 Inter-Cities Fairs Cup
8	Biel-Bienne	26	7	10	9	45	49	−4	24	
9	Zürich	26	8	6	12	53	57	−4	22	
10	Lugano	26	6	10	10	32	60	−28	22	
11	Grenchen	26	7	7	12	39	59	−20	21	
12	Young Fellows Zürich	26	7	6	13	53	63	−10	20	
13	Schaffhausen	26	6	7	13	40	65	−25	19	Relegated to 1962–63 Nationalliga B
14	Fribourg	26	2	7	17	33	80	−47	11	Relegated to 1962–63 Nationalliga B

Source: rsssf.com
Rules for classification: 1) Points; 2) Goal difference within the league, however with play-off for qualifiers;

=== Results ===
Home \ Away	BAS	BB	CDF	FRI	GCZ	GRE	LS	LUG	LUZ	SHA	SER	YB	YFZ	ZÜR
Basel		4–2	3–2	4–3	1–1	2–1	0–0	0–2	1–2	2–1	1–1	6–2	2–2	4–2
Biel-Bienne	4–4		2–3	2–1	3–3	1–0	2–3	1–1	2–2	2–1	1–0	1–4	3–3	3–0
La Chaux-de-Fonds	3–0	3–2		6–1	3–2	2–0	2–3	0–3	1–3	4–0	0–2	2–2	3–0	1–2
Fribourg	1–1	0–0	3–6		2–1	0–4	0–6	1–1	1–2	0–1	0–3	2–2	0–5	2–2
Grasshopper Club	4–3	2–2	0–1	3–1		2–2	2–1	4–0	1–1	4–0	3–2	3–1	2–2	3–4
Grenchen	0–1	2–2	1–3	3–2	2–0		1–2	0–2	2–0	2–2	2–2	2–9	2–0	2–3
Lausanne-Sports	6–1	0–0	3–2	3–2	3–0	1–1		4–1	1–3	6–0	4–0	0–4	2–1	2–2
Lugano	2–2	3–2	1–3	0–3	2–5	0–0	1–1		2–1	1–1	0–4	1–1	3–2	1–1
Luzern	1–1	1–2	1–2	0–0	1–2	1–1	1–4	3–1		4–3	0–1	2–1	3–0	6–2
Schaffhausen	1–2	2–1	0–5	2–2	2–2	4–0	3–0	2–2	1–3		0–5	4–2	6–1	1–4
Servette	5–1	4–1	3–3	9–2	7–0	11–2	4–2	5–0	3–1	4–0		3–0	4–2	4–0
Young Boys	1–4	0–2	3–2	5–1	4–7	2–0	4–1	1–0	3–1	4–0	2–1		0–3	1–0
Young Fellows	1–0	3–2	3–7	7–2	1–3	2–3	1–3	2–2	0–0	1–1	2–5	1–2		4–2
Zürich	4–1	0–0	2–3	2–1	1–2	3–4	0–2	11–0	0–2	2–2	1–1	2–1	1–4	

Source: rsssf.com
Legend: Blue = home team win; Yellow = draw; Red = away team win.

=== Topscorers ===
Rank	Player	Goals	Club
1.	Jacques Fatton	25	Servette
2.	Roberto Frigerio	22	La Chaux-de-Fonds
3.	Eugen Meier	19	Young Boys
3.	Peter von Burg	19	Grasshopper Club
5.	Heinz Bertschi	18	La Chaux-de-Fonds

== Nationalliga B ==
=== Teams, locations ===
Team	Based in	Canton	Stadium	Capacity
FC Aarau	Aarau	Aargau	Stadion Brügglifeld	9,240
AC Bellinzona	Bellinzona	Ticino	Stadio Comunale Bellinzona	5,000
FC Bern	Bern	Bern	Stadion Neufeld	14,000
FC Bodio	Bodio	Ticino	Campo comunale Pollegio	1,000
SC Brühl	St. Gallen	St. Gallen	Paul-Grüninger-Stadion	4,200
FC Chiasso	Chiasso	Ticino	Stadio Comunale Riva IV	4,000
FC Martigny-Sports	Martigny	Valais	Stade d'Octodure	2,500
FC Porrentruy	Porrentruy	Jura	Stade du Tirage	4,226
FC Sion	Sion	Valais	Stade de Tourbillon	16,000
FC Thun	Thun	Bern	Stadion Lachen	10,350
Urania Genève Sport	Genève	Geneva	Stade de Frontenex	4,000
Vevey Sports	Vevey	Vaud	Stade de Copet	4,000
FC Winterthur	Winterthur	Zürich	Schützenwiese	8,550
Yverdon-Sport FC	Yverdon-les-Bains	Vaud	Stade Municipal	6,600

=== Final league table ===
Pos	Team	Pld	W	D	L	GF	GA	GD	Pts	Qualification or relegation
1	FC Sion	26	14	7	5	62	36	+26	35	To play-off for title
2	FC Chiasso	26	14	7	5	54	30	+24	35	To play-off for title
3	FC Winterthur	26	13	6	7	56	37	+19	32	
4	AC Bellinzona	26	11	7	8	56	46	+10	29	
5	Urania Genève Sport	26	11	5	10	52	48	+4	27	
6	FC Thun	26	10	7	9	50	47	+3	27	
7	FC Aarau	26	9	8	9	37	39	−2	26	
8	Vevey Sports	26	10	5	11	40	48	−8	25	
9	FC Porrentruy	26	10	5	11	38	51	−13	25	
10	SC Brühl	26	9	6	11	44	51	−7	24	
11	FC Bern	26	8	6	12	59	48	+11	22	
12	FC Bodio	26	6	10	10	38	47	−9	22	
13	FC Martigny-Sports	26	5	9	12	29	58	−29	19	Relegated to 1962–63 1. Liga
14	Yverdon-Sport FC	26	4	8	14	36	65	−29	16	Relegated to 1962–63 1. Liga

Source: rsssf.com
Rules for classification: 1) Points; 2) Goal difference within the league, however with play-off for qualifiers;

=== Play-off for title ===
Sion and Chiasso finished level on points in joint first position and had both achieved promotion to 1962–63 Nationalliga A. However, it required a play-off to decide the title as NLB champions.

Team 1	Score	Team 2
Chiasso	4–3 (a.e.t.)	Sion

Chiasso won the NLB championship.

== Further in Swiss football ==
- 1961–62 Swiss Cup
- 1961–62 Swiss 1. Liga

== Sources ==
- Switzerland 1961–62 at RSSSF

Preceded by 1960–61	Nationalliga seasons in Switzerland	Succeeded by 1962–63
