= 1960–61 Swiss 1. Liga =

1. Liga
- Season: 1960–61
- Champions: 1. Liga champions: FC Porrentruy; Group West: SC Burgdorf; Group Cenral: FC Porrentruy; Group South and East: FC Bodio
- Promoted: FC Porrentruy; FC Bodio
- Relegated: Group West: FC Stade Payerne; Group Central: FC Bassecourt; Group South and East: FC Wil; AS Lamone-Cadempino
- Matches: 3 times 132 plus 3 play-offs and 3 play-outs

The 1960–61 1. Liga season was the 29th season of the 1. Liga since its creation in 1931. At this time, the 1. Liga was the third-tier of the Swiss football league system and it was the highest level of total amateur football. At this time the clubs in the two higher divisions in Switzerland were beginning to employ semi-professional or even professional players.

== Format ==
There were 36 teams competing in the 1. Liga 1960–61 season. They were divided into three regional groups, each group with 12 teams. Within each group, the teams would play a double round-robin to decide their league position. Two points were awarded for a win. The three group winners then contested a play-off round to decide the two promotion slots. The last placed team in each group were directly relegated to the 2. Liga (fourth tier). The three second last placed teams were to contest a play-out to decide the fourth relegation slot.

== Group West ==
=== Teams, locations ===
Club	Based in	Canton	Stadium	Capacity
FC Bözingen 34	Biel/Bienne	Bern	Längfeld	1,000
SC Burgdorf	Burgdorf	Bern	Stadion Neumatt	3,850
Étoile Carouge FC	Carouge	Geneva	Stade de la Fontenette	3,690
FC Langenthal	Langenthal	Bern	Rankmatte	2,000
ES FC Malley	Malley	Vaud	Centre sportif de la Tuilière	1,500
FC Monthey	Monthey	Valais	Stade Philippe Pottier	1,800
FC Forward Morges	Morges	Vaud	Parc des Sports	600
FC Raron	Raron	Valais	Sportplatz Rhoneglut	1,000
FC Sierre	Sierre	Valais	Complexe Ecossia	2,000
FC Stade Payerne	Payerne	Vaud	Stade Municipal	1,100
FC Versoix	Versoix	Geneva	Centre sportif de la Bécassière	1,000
FC Xamax	Neuchâtel	Neuchâtel	Stade de la Maladière	25,500

=== Final league table ===
Pos	Team	Pld	W	D	L	GF	GA	GD	Pts	Qualification or relegation
1	SC Burgdorf	22	15	4	3	62	21	+41	34	Play-off to Nationalliga B
2	FC Xamax	22	12	4	6	61	46	+15	28	
3	FC Versoix	22	12	2	8	51	44	+7	26	
4	Etoile Carouge FC	22	12	1	9	61	44	+17	25	
5	FC Sierre	22	10	4	8	48	43	+5	24	
6	FC Langenthal	22	9	5	8	51	43	+8	23	
7	FC Bözingen 34	22	8	5	9	55	50	+5	21	
8	FC Forward Morges	22	7	5	10	36	44	−8	19	
9	FC Raron	22	6	7	9	41	56	−15	19	
10	FC Monthey	22	7	5	10	36	52	−16	19	
11	ES FC Malley	22	6	6	10	24	36	−12	18	Play-out against relegation
12	FC Stade Payerne	22	1	6	15	33	80	−47	8	Relegation to 2. Liga

Source: RSSSF
Rules for classification: 1) Points; 2) Goal difference within the league, but decider play-off for qualifiers.

== Group Central ==
=== Teams, locations ===
Club	Based in	Canton	Stadium	Capacity
FC Alle	Alle	Jura	Centre Sportif Régional	2,000
FC Baden	Baden	Aargau	Esp Stadium	7,000
FC Bassecourt	Bassecourt	Jura	Stade des Grands-Prés	3,650
FC Concordia Basel	Basel	Basel-Stadt	Stadion Rankhof	7,000
SR Delémont	Delémont	Jura	La Blancherie	5,263
FC Dietikon	Dietikon	Zürich	Fussballplatz Dornau	1,000
FC Lengnau	Lengnau	Bern	Moos Lengnau BE	3,900
FC Moutier	Moutier	Bern	Stade de Chalière	5,000
BSC Old Boys	Basel	Basel-Stadt	Stadion Schützenmatte	8,000
FC Porrentruy	Porrentruy	Jura	Stade du Tirage	4,226
FC Solothurn	Solothurn	Solothurn	Stadion FC Solothurn	6,750
FC Wettingen	Wettingen	Aargau	Stadion Altenburg	10,000

=== Final league table ===
Pos	Team	Pld	W	D	L	GF	GA	GD	Pts	Qualification or relegation
1	FC Porrentruy	22	14	5	3	39	22	+17	33	Play-off to Nationalliga B
2	FC Baden	22	13	5	4	53	38	+15	31	
3	FC Concordia Basel	22	10	7	5	49	33	+16	27	
4	FC Solothurn	22	9	7	6	47	37	+10	25	
5	FC Moutier	22	7	8	7	42	36	+6	22	
6	FC Dietikon	22	8	6	8	40	33	+7	22	
7	BSC Old Boys	22	8	5	9	26	32	−6	21	
8	FC Alle	22	7	6	9	31	41	−10	20	
9	Lengnau	22	7	6	9	35	46	−11	20	
10	FC Wettingen	22	6	7	9	34	35	−1	19	
11	SR Delémont	22	5	4	13	43	60	−17	14	Play-out against relegation
12	FC Bassecourt	22	3	4	15	24	50	−26	10	Relegation to 2. Liga

Source: RSSSF
Rules for classification: 1) Points; 2) Goal difference within the league, but decider play-off for qualifiers.

== Group South and East ==
=== Teams, locations ===
Club	Based in	Canton	Stadium	Capacity
FC Blue Stars Zürich	Zürich	Zürich	Hardhof	1,000
FC Bodio	Bodio	Ticino	Campo comunale Pollegio	1,000
FC Emmenbrücke	Emmen	Lucerne	Stadion Gersag	8,700
SV Höngg	Zürich	Zürich	Hönggerberg	1,000
AS Lamone-Cadempino	Lamone	Ticino		
FC Locarno	Locarno	Ticino	Stadio comunale Lido	5,000
FC Rapid Lugano	Lugano	Ticino	Cornaredo Stadium	6,330
FC Red Star Zürich	Zürich	Zürich	Allmend Brunau	2,000
FC Solduno	Locarno	Ticino	Campo Morettina / Stadio del Lido	1,000 / 5,000
FC St. Gallen	St. Gallen	St. Gallen	Espenmoos	11,000
FC Vaduz	Vaduz	Liechtenstein	Rheinpark Stadion	7,584
FC Wil	Wil	St. Gallen	Sportpark Bergholz	6,048

=== Final league table ===
Pos	Team	Pld	W	D	L	GF	GA	GD	Pts	Qualification or relegation
1	FC Bodio	22	15	5	2	50	24	+26	35	Play-off to Nationalliga B
2	FC St. Gallen	22	13	6	3	77	36	+41	32	
3	FC Locarno	22	11	7	4	47	35	+12	29	
4	FC Blue Stars Zürich	22	10	7	5	56	32	+24	27	
5	SV Höngg	22	7	8	7	40	42	−2	22	
6	FC Red Star Zürich	22	6	9	7	31	34	−3	21	
7	FC Emmenbrücke	22	7	5	10	39	47	−8	19	
8	FC Solduno	22	6	7	9	34	47	−13	19	
9	FC Vaduz	22	7	4	11	53	63	−10	18	
10	FC Rapid Lugano	22	6	5	11	26	31	−5	17	
11	FC Wil	22	4	6	12	27	46	−19	14	Play-out against relegation
12	AS Lamone-Cadempino	22	4	3	15	25	68	−43	11	Relegation to 2. Liga

Source: RSSSF
Rules for classification: 1) Points; 2) Goal difference within the league, but decider play-off for qualifiers.

== Promotion, relegation ==
=== Promotion play-off ===
The three group winners played single a round-robin for the two promotion slots and for the championship. The games were played on 18 and 25 June and 2 July 1961.

Pos	Team	Pld	W	D	L	GF	GA	GD	Pts	Qualification	POR	BOD	BUR
1	FC Porrentruy	2	1	1	0	4	3	+1	3	1. Liga champions and promotion to 1961–62 Nationalliga B	—	—	3–2
2	FC Bodio	2	0	2	0	1	1	0	2	Promotion to 1961–62 Nationalliga B	1–1	—	—
3	SC Burgdorf	2	0	1	1	2	3	−1	1		—	0–0	—

Source: RSSSF
Rules for classification: 1) Points; 2) Head-to-head 3) Decider.

FC Porrentruy became 1. Liga champions. The champions and the runners-up FC Bodio were promoted to 1961–62 Nationalliga B. SC Burgdorf remained in the division.

=== Relegation play-out ===
The three second last placed teams in each group, contested a play-out to decide the fourth and last relegation slot. The games were played on 18 and 25 June and 2 July 1961.

Pos	Team	Pld	W	D	L	GF	GA	GD	Pts	Relegation	DEL	ESM	WIL
1	SR Delémont	2	2	0	0	4	1	+3	4		—	—	3–1
2	ES FC Malley	2	1	0	1	2	1	+1	2		0–1	—	—
3	FC Wil	2	0	0	2	1	5	−4	0	Relegation to 2. Liga	—	0–2	—

Source: RSSSF
Rules for classification: 1) Points; 2) Head-to-head 3) Decider.

Delémont and Malley remained in the division. FC Wil were relegated to 2. Liga.

== Further in Swiss football ==
- 1960–61 Nationalliga A
- 1960–61 Nationalliga B
- 1960–61 Swiss Cup

== Sources ==
- Switzerland 1960–61 at RSSSF

Preceded by 1959–60	Seasons in Swiss 1. Liga	Succeeded by 1961–62
