= 1962–63 Nationalliga A =

Swiss football season

Nationalliga A
- Season: 1962–63
- Champions: Zürich
- Relegated: Young Fellows; Lugano
- Top goalscorer: Peter von Burg (Zürich); 24 goals

Nationalliga B
- Season: 1962–63
- Champions: FC Schaffhausen
- Promoted: FC Schaffhausen; Cantonal Neuchâtel
- Relegated: Moutier; Bodio
- Top goalscorer: Adolf Tochtermann (Winterthur); 22 goals

The following is the summary of the Swiss National League in the 1962–63 football season, both Nationalliga A and Nationalliga B. This was the 66th season of top-tier and the 65th season of second-tier football in Switzerland.

== Overview ==
The Swiss Football Association (ASF/SFV) had 28 member clubs at this time which were divided into two divisions of 14 teams each. The teams played a double round-robin to decide their table positions. Two points were awarded for a win and one point was awarded for a draw. The top tier (NLA) was contested by the top 12 teams from the previous 1961–62 season and the two newly promoted teams FC Sion and FC Chiasso. The champions would qualify for the 1963–64 European Cup and the last two teams in the league table at the end of the season were to be relegated.

The second-tier (NLB) was contested by the two teams that had been relegated from the NLA at the end of the last season, Schaffhausen and Fribourg, the ten teams that had been in third to twelfth position last season and the two newly promoted teams FC Cantonal Neuchâtel and FC Moutier. The top two teams at the end of the season would be promoted to the 1963–64 NLA and the two last placed teams would be relegated to the 1963–64 Swiss 1. Liga.

The Swiss champions received a slot in the 1963–64 European Cup and the Cup winners received a slot in the 1964–65 Cup Winners' Cup.

== Nationalliga A ==
=== Teams, locations ===
Team	Based in	Canton	Stadium	Capacity
FC Basel	Basel	Basel-Stadt	St. Jakob Stadium	36,800
FC Biel-Bienne	Biel/Bienne	Bern	Stadion Gurzelen	15,000
FC Chiasso	Chiasso	Ticino	Stadio Comunale Riva IV	4,000
Grasshopper Club Zürich	Zürich	Zürich	Hardturm	20,000
FC Grenchen	Grenchen	Solothurn	Stadium Brühl	15,100
FC La Chaux-de-Fonds	La Chaux-de-Fonds	Neuchâtel	Centre Sportif de la Charrière	12,700
FC Lausanne-Sport	Lausanne	Vaud	Pontaise	15,700
FC Lugano	Lugano	Ticino	Cornaredo Stadium	6,330
FC Luzern	Lucerne	Lucerne	Stadion Allmend	25,000
Servette FC	Geneva	Geneva	Stade des Charmilles	27,000
FC Sion	Sion	Valais	Stade de Tourbillon	16,000
BSC Young Boys	Bern	Bern	Wankdorf Stadium	56,000
FC Young Fellows	Zürich	Zürich	Utogrund	2,850
FC Zürich	Zürich	Zürich	Letzigrund	25,000

=== Final league table ===
Pos	Team	Pld	W	D	L	GF	GA	GD	Pts	Qualification or relegation
1	Zürich	26	20	4	2	81	33	+48	44	Swiss Champions qualified for 1963–64 European Cup and entered 1963–64 Intertoto Cup
2	Lausanne-Sport	26	18	4	4	81	30	+51	40	Entered 1963–64 Inter-Cities Fairs Cup
3	La Chaux-de-Fonds	26	12	8	6	55	44	+11	32	Entered 1963–64 Intertoto Cup
4	Young Boys	26	13	5	8	62	49	+13	31	
5	Servette	26	11	4	11	54	39	+15	26	Entered 1963–64 Inter-Cities Fairs Cup
6	Basel	26	10	6	10	59	51	+8	26	Swiss Cup winners qualified for 1963–64 European Cup Winners' Cup
7	Grasshopper Club	26	9	7	10	57	51	+6	25	
8	Biel-Bienne	26	9	6	11	38	44	−6	24	
9	Grenchen	26	8	7	11	40	49	−9	23	
10	Luzern	26	7	9	10	41	54	−13	23	
11	Chiasso	26	7	6	13	33	69	−36	20	
12	Sion	26	6	7	13	37	69	−32	19	
13	Young Fellows Zürich	26	7	3	16	34	58	−24	17	Relegated to 1963–64 Nationalliga B
14	Lugano	26	4	6	16	21	53	−32	14	Relegated to 1963–64 Nationalliga B

Source: rsssf.com
Rules for classification: 1) Points; 2) Goal difference within the league, however with play-off for qualifiers;

=== Results ===
Home \ Away	BAS	BB	CDF	CHI	GCZ	GRE	LS	LUG	LUZ	SER	SIO	YB	YFZ	ZÜR
Basel		3–2	3–4	2–2	1–2	3–5	3–1	3–0	0–2	3–2	8–1	2–2	2–1	0–1
Biel-Bienne	1–2		4–3	1–1	0–3	3–1	1–0	2–1	1–1	3–3	6–1	3–2	1–0	1–4
La Chaux-de-Fonds	3–2	3–1		4–0	1–1	1–1	2–2	1–1	2–2	4–1	2–1	2–1	1–0	6–4
Chiasso	2–4	0–1	3–2		2–1	2–1	2–4	2–0	2–4	2–4	0–2	2–2	2–0	0–6
Grasshopper Club	3–0	0–0	5–4	9–1		1–1	4–2	0–0	4–1	0–3	6–1	0–0	3–3	1–3
Grenchen	3–2	1–0	2–3	1–1	1–1		0–1	2–0	3–0	3–1	5–0	2–4	1–0	0–6
Lausanne-Sport	0–0	1–1	1–0	4–1	6–2	3–0		3–2	6–2	2–1	5–0	4–0	6–0	9–1
Lugano	0–3	0–2	0–2	0–1	2–0	1–1	0–1		0–0	1–0	2–1	1–2	5–1	0–0
Luzern	1–1	2–1	1–1	3–0	4–2	2–1	2–1	2–2		1–1	1–2	2–5	1–3	3–5
Servette	3–1	4–1	3–1	0–0	3–1	4–1	1–3	5–1	0–0		6–0	2–3	3–0	0–1
Sion	3–3	1–1	1–1	1–1	1–0	1–1	3–5	7–1	1–1	1–0		0–1	3–0	0–1
Young Boys	2–2	3–0	3–0	3–4	6–3	6–0	1–6	4–1	3–0	2–0	2–2		1–2	1–5
Young Fellows	2–4	1–0	1–2	3–0	1–5	1–1	0–4	3–0	3–2	1–3	4–1	1–3		3–3
Zürich	3–2	3–1	0–0	7–0	4–0	2–1	1–1	5–0	4–1	3–1	6–2	2–0	1–0	

Source: rsssf.com
Legend: Blue = home team win; Yellow = draw; Red = away team win.

=== Topscorers ===
Rank	Player	Goals	Club
1.	von Burg Peter	24	FC Zürich
2.	Bertschi Heinz	22	FC La Chaux-de-Fonds
3.	Frigerio Roberto	21	FC La Chaux-de-Fonds
4.	Meier Eugen	18	BSC Young Boys
5.	Blumer Heinz	16	FC Basel
5.	Heuri Walter	16	Servette Genève
5.	Anker Francis	16	FC Sion
5.	Stürmer Klaus (GER)	16	FC Zürich
9.	Daina André	15	BSC Young Boys
10.	Odermatt Karl	14	FC Basel
10.	Kunz Georg	14	Grasshopper Club
12.	Charly Hertig	13	Lausanne-Sports
12.	Fischer Paul	13	FC Luzern
13.	Dürr Richard	12	Lausanne-Sports
13.	Brizzi Bruno	12	FC Zürich
15.	Hosp Robert	11	Lausanne-Sports
15.	Wechselberger Ernst (GER)	11	BSC Young Boys
15.	Benkö Josef (HUN)	11	Young Fellows
18.	Graf Edgar	10	FC Biel-Bienne
18.	Bergna Enzo	10	FC Chiasso
18.	Gronau Rolf	10	Grasshopper Club
18.	Duret Raymond	10	Grasshopper Club

== Nationalliga B ==
=== Teams, locations ===
Team	Based in	Canton	Stadium	Capacity
FC Aarau	Aarau	Aargau	Stadion Brügglifeld	9,240
AC Bellinzona	Bellinzona	Ticino	Stadio Comunale Bellinzona	5,000
FC Bern	Bern	Bern	Stadion Neufeld	14,000
FC Bodio	Bodio	Ticino	Campo comunale Pollegio	1,000
SC Brühl	St. Gallen	St. Gallen	Paul-Grüninger-Stadion	4,200
FC Cantonal Neuchâtel	Neuchâtel	Neuchâtel	Stade de la Maladière	25,500
FC Fribourg	Fribourg	Fribourg	Stade Universitaire	9,000
FC Moutier	Moutier	Bern	Stade de Chalière	5,000
FC Porrentruy	Porrentruy	Jura	Stade du Tirage	4,226
FC Schaffhausen	Schaffhausen	Schaffhausen	Stadion Breite	7,300
FC Thun	Thun	Bern	Stadion Lachen	10,350
Urania Genève Sport	Genève	Geneva	Stade de Frontenex	4,000
Vevey Sports	Vevey	Vaud	Stade de Copet	4,000
FC Winterthur	Winterthur	Zürich	Schützenwiese	8,550

=== Final league table ===
Pos	Team	Pld	W	D	L	GF	GA	GD	Pts	Qualification or relegation
1	FC Schaffhausen	26	14	7	5	55	31	+24	35	NLB Champions and promoted to 1963–64 Nationalliga A
2	FC Cantonal Neuchâtel	26	13	5	8	52	39	+13	31	Promoted to 1963–64 Nationalliga A
3	FC Winterthur	26	12	4	10	53	37	+16	28	
4	AC Bellinzona	26	9	10	7	41	33	+8	28	
5	SC Brühl	26	11	5	10	51	46	+5	27	
6	Urania Genève Sport	26	9	9	8	40	37	+3	27	
7	FC Thun	26	11	5	10	51	50	+1	27	
8	Vevey Sports	26	11	4	11	47	46	+1	26	
9	FC Porrentruy	26	11	3	12	46	57	−11	25	
10	FC Aarau	26	8	8	10	46	49	−3	24	
11	FC Bern	26	9	6	11	37	41	−4	24	
12	FC Moutier	26	9	6	11	31	51	−20	24	
13	FC Bodio	26	8	6	12	22	41	−19	22	Relegated to 1963–64 1. Liga
14	FC Fribourg	26	6	4	16	41	55	−14	16	Relegated to 1963–64 1. Liga

Source: rsssf.com
Rules for classification: 1) Points; 2) Goal difference within the league, however with play-off for qualifiers;

== Further in Swiss football ==
- 1962–63 Swiss Cup
- 1962–63 Swiss 1. Liga

== Sources ==
- Switzerland 1962–63 at RSSSF

Preceded by 1961–62	Nationalliga seasons in Switzerland	Succeeded by 1963–64
