= 1962–63 Swiss Cup =

Tournament details
- Country: Switzerland

Final positions
- Champions: Basel
- Runners-up: Grasshoppers

The 1962–63 Swiss Cup was the 38th season of Switzerland's football cup competition, organised annually since 1925–26 by the Swiss Football Association.

== Overview ==
This season's cup competition began with the games of the first round, played on the week-end of the 8 and 9 September 1962. The competition was completed on Easter Monday 15 April 1963, with the final, which was traditionally held at the former Wankdorf Stadium in Bern. The clubs from the 1962–63 Swiss 1. Liga were given a bye for the first round, they played in the second round on the week-end of 29 and 30 September. The clubs from this season's Nationalliga A (NLA) and from this season's Nationalliga B (NLB) were given byes for the first two rounds. These teams joined the competition in the third round, which was played on the week-end of 3 and 4 of November.

The matches were played in a knockout format. In the event of a draw after 90 minutes, the match went into extra time. In the event of a draw at the end of extra time, a replay was foreseen and this was played on the visiting team's pitch. If the replay ended in a draw after extra time, a toss of a coin would establish the team qualified for the next round. The cup winners qualified themselves for the first round of the Cup Winners' Cup in the next season.

== Round 1 ==
In the first phase, the lower league teams that had qualified themselves for the competition through their regional football association's regional cup competitions or their association's requirements, competed here. Whenever possible, the draw respected local regionalities. The first round was played on the weekend of 8 and 9 September 1962.

=== Summary ===
==== Region Ostschweiz ====
Team 1	Score	Team 2
8 and 9 September 1962
FC Fortuna (St.Gallen)	2–4 (a.e.t.)	Kreuzlingen
FC Widnau	2–0	Arbon
FC Glarus	10–3	FC Ems

==== Region Zürich ====
Team 1	Score	Team 2
8 and 9 September 1962
FC Lachen	0–1	FC Wil
SV Seebach	0–1	Juventus Zürich
FC Dübendorf	1–2	FC Zürich-Affoltern
Uster	4–0	FC Oberwinterthur
FC Neuhausen	1–3	FC Diessenhofen
FC Wollerau	0–2	FC Zug

==== Region Bern ====
Team 1	Score	Team 2
8 and 9 September 1962
FC Courtemaîche	1–1 (a.e.t.)	FC Mett/Mâche
FC Mett/Mâche	5–2	FC Courtemaîche
Länggasse Bern	5–3	Dürrenast
FC Steffisburg	1–2	FC Interlaken
FC Bözingen 34	7–2	FC Aurore Bienne
FC Kirchberg (BE)	4–2 (a.e.t.)	FC Schönenwerd

Replay

Team 1	Score	Team 2
16 September 1962
FC Mett/Mâche	5–2	FC Courtemaîche

==== Region Solothurn ====
Team 1	Score	Team 2
8 and 9 September 1962
SC Deitingen	4–1	FC Subingen
FC Klus-Balstahl	2–4	FC Pratteln

==== Region Nordwestschweiz ====
Team 1	Score	Team 2
8 and 9 September 1962
FC Aesch	0–1 (a.e.t.)	Black Stars
FC Oberwil (BL)	1–1 (a.e.t.)	FC Breitenbach

Replay

Team 1	Score	Team 2
16 September 1962
FC Breitenbach	4–3	FC Oberwil (BL)

==== Region Aargau ====
Team 1	Score	Team 2
8 September 1962
Zofingen	3–1	Schöftland
23 September 1962
FC Villmergen	0–3	FC Turicum ZH

==== Region Innerschweiz ====
Team 1	Score	Team 2
8 and 9 September 1962
FC Obergeissenstein	2–1	SC Buochs
FC Brunnen	2–1	FC Goldau

==== Region Ticino ====
Team 1	Score	Team 2
8 and 9 September 1962
US Verscio	2–3	AS Minusio
FC Lumino	0–1	FC Armonia Lugano
FC Valcandana	1–5	Mendrisiostar

==== Region Romande ====
Team 1	Score	Team 2
8 and 9 September 1962
FC Fontainemelon	2–4	FC Saint-Imier
Central Fribourg	1–2	FC Morat
Compesières FC GE	4–2	Meyrin
Chênois	2–1	Signal FC (Bernex)
FC Bavois	3–3 (a.e.t.)	FC Assens
FC Fully	6–4	FC Brig
FC Prilly	2–3	Montreux-Sports
FC Chevroux	1–2	FC Fétigny

Replay

Team 1	Score	Team 2
16 September 1962
FC Assens	beat	FC Bavois

== Round 2 ==
The clubs from the 1962–63 Swiss 1. Liga were given a bye for the first round, they joined the competition here, in the second round.

=== Summary ===
Team 1	Score	Team 2
29 and 30 September 1962
AS Minusio	0–1	FC Küsnacht (ZH)
FC Armonia Lugano	1–0	FC Solduno
FC Rapid Lugano	1–1 (a.e.t.)	Mendrisiostar
Locarno	3–0	FC Brunnen
Emmenbrücke	3–2 (a.e.t.)	FC Obergeissenstein
Vaduz	5–3	FC Glarus
FC Widnau	0–2	FC Dietikon
Polizei Zürich	0–2	Uster
FC Wil	4–2	Blue Stars
Kreuzlingen	0–9	St. Gallen
Red Star	2–1	FC Zürich-Affoltern
Bülach	9–2	FC Diessenhofen
Baden	2–0	Juventus Zürich
Zofingen	1–3	Wettingen
FC Langenthal	2–0	FC Turicum ZH
Nordstern	1–4	FC Pratteln
FC Breitenbach	1–2	Alle
FC Mett/Mâche	2–5	Concordia
Solothurn	5–1	Delémont
FC Zug	1–4	Wohlen
FC Saint-Imier	1–2 (a.e.t.)	FC Breite Basel
Old Boys	2–3	Black Stars
FC Gerlafingen	2–1	SC Deitingen
FC Morat	0–4	ES Malley
FC Bözingen 34	0–1	Burgdorf
Lengnau	1–1 (a.e.t.)	FC Interlaken
Neuchâtel Xamax	3–2	FC Länggasse (BE)
Yverdon-Sport	6–2	FC Kirchberg (BE)
Stade Lausanne	4–2	Le Locle-Sports
FC Versoix	3–0	Meyrin
Chênois	3–1	FC Renens
FC Assens	3–0	FC Sierre
FC Fully	2–1	Monthey
Montreux-Sports	1–1 (a.e.t.)	FC Raron
Etoile Carouge	4–1	FC Forward Morges
Martigny-Sports	1–1 (a.e.t.)	FC Fétigny

Replays

Team 1	Score	Team 2
'14 October 1962
Mendrisiostar	1–0	FC Rapid Lugano
FC Interlaken	1–3	Lengnau
'28 October 1962
FC Raron	2–1	Montreux-Sports
FC Fétigny	3–2	Martigny-Sports

== Round 3 ==
The teams from the NLA and NLB entered the cup competition in this round. However, they were seeded and could not be drawn against each other. Whenever possible, the draw respected local regionalities. The lower-tier team in each encounter was granted home advantage, if they so wished. The third round was played on the week-end of 3 and 4 of November.

=== Summary ===
Team 1	Score	Team 2
3 and 4 November 1962
Servette	14–2	Stade Lausanne
Mendrisiostar	2–0 (a.e.t.)	FC Armonia Lugano
Red Star	0–1 *	Lugano
Wohlen	2–6	Chiasso
FC Bülach	0–2	Winterthur
Young Boys	9–1	ES Malley
Basel	4–0	Black Stars
Lengnau	2–5 (a.e.t.)	Bern
Burgdorf	3–0	Neuchâtel Xamax
Lausanne-Sport	7–1	FC Assens
La Chaux-de-Fonds	3–1	FC Fully
Moutier	0–1	FC Langenthal
Schaffhausen	1–4	Wettingen
Yverdon-Sport	1–2	Biel-Bienne
FC Pratteln	1–1 (a.e.t.)	FC Porrentruy
Fribourg	1–3 (a.e.t.)	Solothurn
Chênois	2–1	Etoile Carouge
Baden	4–0	Vaduz
FC Breite Basel	0–3	Grenchen
FC Dietikon	4–1	Bodio
Sion	2–1	FC Raron
Urania Genève Sport	4–2 (a.e.t.)	FC Versoix
Young Fellows	3–2	FC Wil
Emmenbrücke	0–1 (a.e.t.)	Bellinzona
Locarno	1–2	Luzern
Zürich	5–0	FC Küsnacht ZH
FC Gerlafingen	0–2	Thun
Cantonal Neuchâtel	0–2 (a.e.t.)	Concordia
Aarau	3–2	Alle
Uster	2–3	Brühl
Vevey Sports	6–1	FC Fétigny

- Match Red Star–Lugano was played in Lugano

Replay

Team 1	Score	Team 2
11 November 1962
FC Porrentruy	5–1	FC Pratteln

=== Matches ===
3 November 1962

Servette	14–2	Stade Lausanne
3x Heuri; 2x Desbiolles (o.g.); 4x Fatton; 2x Mekhloufi; 1x Romolo Merlin; 1x Németh	summary	Goal

Stade des Charmilles, Geneva

3 November 1962
14:30

Basel	4–0	Black Stars
Weber 4' (1:0); Burri 16' (2:0); Blumer 32' (3:0); Pfirter 36' (4:0)	FCB summary

Landhof, Basel
Attendance: 2.800
Referee: (Switzerland) Zürrer (Feldmeilen)

4 November 1962

Zürich	5–0	FC Küsnacht
Kuhn 21' (1:0); Stürmer 30' (2:0); Hügi 51' (3:0); Brodmann 71 pen' Hügi 82' (5:0)	FCZ summary

Letzigrund, Zürich
Attendance: 1,700
Referee: (Switzerland) Josef Heymann (Basel)

4 November 1962

Aarau	3–2	Alle
Goal	FCA summary	Goal

Stadion Brügglifeld, Aarau

== Round 4 ==
=== Summary ===
Team 1	Score	Team 2
2 December 1962
Mendrisiostar	0–1	Lugano
Chiasso	4–1	Winterthur
Young Boys	0–2	Basel
Bern	1–2	Burgdorf
Lausanne-Sport	2–1	La Chaux-de-Fonds
FC Langenthal	2–1	Wettingen
Biel-Bienne	2–0	FC Porrentruy
Solothurn	2–0	Chênois
Baden	2–1	Grenchen
Grasshopper Club	3–1 (a.e.t.)	FC Dietikon
Sion	2–1	Urania Genève Sport
Young Fellows	3–0	Bellinzona
Luzern	2–1	Zürich
Thun	1–0	Concordia
Aarau	3–0	Brühl
Servette	6–1	Vevey Sports

=== Matches ===
2 December 1962
14:30

Young Boys	0–2	Basel
	FCB summary	48' (0:1) Odermatt; 69' (0:2) Pfirter

Wankdorf Stadium, Bern
Attendance: 10,000
Referee: (Switzerland) Albert Guinnard (Gletterens)

2 December 1962

Luzern	2–1	Zürich
Walter Wüest 48' (1:1); Rudy Arn 72' (2:1)	FCZ summary	23' (0:1) Meyer

Stadion Allmend, Lucerne
Attendance: 8,500
Referee: (Switzerland) Daniel Mellet (Lausanne)

2 December 1962

Aarau	3–0	Brühl
Goal	FCA summary

Stadion Brügglifeld, Aarau

2 December 1962

Servette	6–1	Vevey Sports
2x Makay; 3x Fatton; 1x Heuri	Servette summary	Goal

Stade des Charmilles, Geneva

== Round 5 ==
=== Summary ===
Team 1	Score	Team 2
23 December 1962
Lugano	0–1	Chiasso
Sion	2–1	Young Fellows
30 December 1962
Basel	7–1	Burgdorf
Lausanne-Sport	6–0	FC Langenthal
Baden	0–4	Grasshopper Club
Luzern	5–2	Thun
Aarau	2–4	Servette
6 January 1963
Biel-Bienne	2–0	Solothurn

=== Matches ===
30 December 1962
14:30

Basel	7–1	SC Burgdorf
Pfirter 31' (1:0); Weber 60' (2:1); Blumer 67' (3:1); Walther 69' (4:1); Odermatt 70' (5:1); Gatti 80' (6:1); Pfirter 76' (7:1)	FCB summary	55' (1:1) Walther

Landhof, Basel
Attendance: 950
Referee: (Switzerland) Anton Bucheli (Luzern)

30 December 1962

Aarau	2–4	Servette
Goal	FCA summary Servette summary	2x Desbiolles; 1x Heuri; 1x Rahis

Stadion Brügglifeld, Aarau

== Quarter-finals ==
=== Summary ===
Team 1	Score	Team 2
24 February 1963
Chiasso	1–2	Basel
Lausanne-Sport	4–1	Biel-Bienne
Grasshopper Club	4–0	Sion
Luzern	0–1 (a.e.t.)	Servette

=== Matches ===
24 February 1963

Chiasso	1–2	Basel
G. Albisett 79' (1:2)	FCB summary	16' (0:1) Pfirter; 20' (0:2) Odermatt

Stadio Comunale (Chiasso), Chiasso
Attendance: 1.800
Referee: (Switzerland) Daniel Mellet (Lausanne)

24 February 1963

Luzern	0–1 (a.e.t.)	Servette
	Servette summary	(0:1) Heuri

Stadion Allmend, Lucerne

== Semi-finals ==
=== Summary ===
Team 1	Score	Team 2
1 19
Basel	1–0	Lausanne-Sport
Grasshopper Club	4–2	Servette

=== Matches ===
24 March 1963
15:00

Basel	1–0	Lausanne-Sports
Pfirter 19'	FCB summary

St. Jakob Stadium, Basel
Attendance: 17,000
Referee: (Switzerland) Othmar Huber (Thun)

24 March 1963

Grasshopper Club	4–2	Servette
Ivo Ghilardi 34' (1:1); Georg Kunz 42' (2:1); Raymond Duret 55' (3:1); Georg Kunz 88' (4:2)	Servette summary	30' (0:1) Heuri; 57' (3:2) Makay

Hardturm, Zürich

== Final ==
The final was held at the former Wankdorf Stadium in Bern on Easter Monday 1963.

=== Summary ===
Team 1	Score	Team 2
15 April 1963
Basel	2–0	Grasshopper Club

=== Telegram ===
15 April 1963
15:00

Basel	2–0	Grasshoppers
Blumer 59' (1:0); Ludwig 67' (2:0)	Fussball-Schweiz summary

Wankdorf Stadium, Bern
Attendance: 40,000
Referee: (Switzerland) Daniel Mellet (Lausanne)

Basel won the cup and this was the club's third cup title to this date.

== Further in Swiss football ==
- 1962–63 Nationalliga A
- 1962–63 Swiss 1. Liga

== Sources ==
- Fussball-Schweiz
- FCB Cup games 1962–63 at fcb-achiv.ch
- Switzerland 1962–63 at RSSSF

Preceded by 1961–62	Swiss Cup seasons	Succeeded by 1963–64
