= 1960–61 Swiss Cup =

Tournament details
- Country: Switzerland

Final positions
- Champions: La Chaux-de-Fonds
- Runners-up: Biel-Bienne

The 1960–61 Swiss Cup was the 36th season of Switzerland's football cup competition, organised annually since 1925–26 by the Swiss Football Association.

== Overview ==
This season's cup competition began with the games of the first round, played on the week-end of the 11 September 1960. The competition was completed on Sunday, 23 April 1961, with the final, which was traditionally held at the former Wankdorf Stadium in Bern. The clubs from the 1960–61 Swiss 1. Liga were given a bye for the first round, they played in the second round on the week-end of 25 and 26 September. The clubs from this season's Nationalliga A (NLA) and from this season's Nationalliga B (NLB) were given byes for the first two rounds. These teams joined the competition in the third round, which was played on the week-end of 16 and 17 of October.

The matches were played in a knockout format. In the event of a draw after 90 minutes, the match went into extra time. In the event of a draw at the end of extra time, a replay was foreseen and this was played on the visiting team's pitch. If the replay ended in a draw after extra time, a second replay would take place. Should this 2nd replay end in a draw after extra time, a toss of a coin would establish the team qualified for the next round. The cup winners qualified themselves for the first round of the Cup Winners' Cup in the next season.

== Round 1 ==
In the first phase, the lower league teams that had qualified themselves for the competition through their regional football association's regional cup competitions or their association's requirements, competed here. Whenever possible, the draw respected local regionalities. The first round was played on the weekend of 11 September 1961.

=== Summary ===
==== Region Ostschweiz ====
Team 1	Score	Team 2
11 September 1960
Chur	5–1	FC Uznach
FC Widnau	3–1	FC St. Margarethen
FC Bürglen	1–2	Frauenfeld
FC Flawil	2–1	FC Uzwil

==== Region Zürich ====
Team 1	Score	Team 2
11 September 1960
FC Neuhausen	3–2	FC Thayngen
SC Veltheim	4–1	FC Unterstrass (ZH)
Uster	4–6	FC Adliswil
Polizei Zürich	8–4	FC Dübendorf
SV Seebach	4–5	FC Küsnacht (ZH)

==== Region Bern ====
Team 1	Score	Team 2
11 September 1960
Le Locle-Sports	2–1	SV Lyss
FC Mett	3–1	FC Reconvilier
FC Madretsch (Biel)	1–5	US Bienne-Boujean
Minerva Bern	2–3	FC Herzogenbuchsee

==== Region Solothurn ====
Team 1	Score	Team 2
11 September 1960
FC Biberist	4–2	FC Helvetia Bern
SC Deitingen	2–3	FC Wolfwil
FC Gerlafingen	5–1	SC Derendingen

==== Region Nordwestschweiz ====
Team 1	Score	Team 2
11 September 1960
FC Breitenbach	4–0	FC Courtemaîche
FC Birsfelden	3–5	FC Trimbach
FC Aesch	1–2	FC Breite Basel
FC Riehen	0–1	SC Kleinhüningen

==== Region Aargau ====
Team 1	Score	Team 2
11 September 1960
FC Oberentfelden	3–7 (a.e.t.)	FC Schönenwerd
FC Gränichen	6–1	FC Laufenburg
FC Turgi	3–6	Wohlen

==== Region Innerschweiz ====
Team 1	Score	Team 2
11 September 1960
FC Zug	3–1	SC Zug
Kriens	4–4 (a.e.t.)	Cham
Kickers Luzern	6–2	Luzerner SC

Replay

Team 1	Score	Team 2
18 September 1960
Cham	2–1	Kriens

==== Region Ticino ====
Team 1	Score	Team 2
11 September 1960
Biaschesi	0–2	US Pro Daro
US Giubiasco	1–4	Mendrisio

==== Region Romande ====
Team 1	Score	Team 2
11 September 1960
FC Lutry	8–2	FC Assens
US Lausanne	4–2 (a.e.t.)	Stade Lausanne
US Campagnes (GE)	1–3	Signal FC (Bernex)
Bulle	3–1	Montreux-Sports
FC Couvet	5–4 (a.e.t.)	FC Fleurier
FC Saint-Maurice	5–1	FC Saint-Léonard
FC Fétigny	4–1	FC Estavayer-le-Lac
Lancy-Sports	0–0 (a.e.t.)	Chênois

Replay

Team 1	Score	Team 2
18 September 1960
Chênois	4–0	Lancy-Sports

== Round 2 ==
The clubs from the 1960–61 Swiss 1. Liga were given a bye for the first round, they now joined the competition here, in the second round.

=== Summary ===
Team 1	Score	Team 2
25 September 1960
Vaduz	6–3	FC Widnau
FC Flawil	0–1	FC Wil
Frauenfeld	0–2	Red Star
St. Gallen	8–3	FC Neuhausen
SC Veltheim	1–5	Blue Stars
Chur	0–1	SV Höngg
SC Cham	1–4	FC Rapid Lugano
Polizei Zürich	5–4	Locarno
Kickers Luzern	2–1	FC Solduno
Bodio	3–0	FC Zug
Mendrisio	3–0	AS Lamone-Cadempino
US Pro Daro	2–1	Emmenbrücke
Baden	4–0	Wohlen
Concordia	3–1	FC Gränichen
FC Dietikon	8–3	FC Adliswil
Wettingen	0–1 (a.e.t.)	FC Küsnacht (ZH)
Old Boys	5–2	FC Schönenwerd
Burgdorf	3–2	FC Herzogenbuchsee
Solothurn	2–2 (a.e.t.)	FC Trimbach
Moutier	5–2	FC Wolfwil
FC Gerlafingen	1–2	FC Langenthal
FC Biberist	1–6	Lengnau
Delémont	3–2	FC Breite (Basel)
FC Breitenbach	2–0	Alle
FC Bözingen 34	3–0	SC Kleinhüningen
US Bienne-Boujean	0–3	Neuchâtel Xamax
FC Porrentruy	10–0	FC Mett
Chênois	3–2	Etoile Carouge
FC Bassecourt	1–2	Le Locle-Sports
FC Couvet	2–1	FC Stade Payerne
Signal FC (Bernex)	1–0	ES Malley
Bulle	1–3	FC Versoix
FC Forward Morges	3–1	US Lausanne
FC Lutry	0–5	FC Sierre
FC Fétigny	4–5	FC Raron
FC Saint-Maurice	0–2	Monthey

Replay

Team 1	Score	Team 2
2 October 1960
FC Trimbach	3–6	Solothurn

== Round 3 ==
The teams from the NLA and NLB entered the cup competition in this round. However, the teams from the NLA were seeded and could not be drawn against each other. Whenever possible, the draw respected local regionalities. The third round was played on the week-end of 16 and 17 of October.

=== Summary ===
Team 1	Score	Team 2
16 October 1960
Schaffhausen	8–0	Vaduz
Solothurn	0–2	Grenchen
FC Porrentruy	3–0	Nordstern
Concordia	2–1	Basel
Bern	2–0	FC Bözingen 34
Le Locle-Sports	3–2	Fribourg
Chênois	0–2	Urania Genève Sport
Aarau	1–3	Lengnau
FC Raron	0–4	Martigny-Sports
Signal FC (Bernex)	3–1	FC Sierre
Baden	2–4	Thun
Old Boys	2–0	Neuchâtel Xamax
Biel-Bienne	4–0	Burgdorf
FC Langenthal	0–8	Young Boys
Chiasso	1–0	FC Rapid Lugano
Bellinzona	3–2 (a.e.t.)	Kickers Luzern
Brühl	5–2	FC Küsnacht (ZH)
Winterthur	5–0	FC Wil
Polizei Zürich	0–2	Young Fellows
FC Forward Morges	0–2	Servette
Monthey	1–4	Sion
Lugano	7–0	Mendrisio
Luzern	9–0	US Pro Daro
FC Couvet	1–3	Vevey Sports
Lausanne-Sport	3–0	FC Versoix
FC Breitenbach	1–1 (a.e.t.)	Yverdon-Sport
St. Gallen	1–0 abd after 45'	Zürich
Delémont	ppd	La Chaux-de-Fonds
FC Dietikon	ppd	Grasshopper Club
Blue Stars	ppd	Bodio
SV Höngg	ppd	Red Star
Moutier	ppd	Cantonal Neuchâtel

Replays

Team 1	Score	Team 2
27 October 1960
La Chaux-de-Fonds	3–1	Delémont
30 October 1960
Blue Stars	2–1	Bodio
SV Höngg	2–1	Red Star
6 November 1960
Yverdon-Sport	1–0	FC Breitenbach
St. Gallen	1–4	Zürich
FC Dietikon	2–3	Grasshopper Club
Moutier	1–4	Cantonal Neuchâtel

=== Matches ===
16 October 1960
15:00

Concordia Basel	2–1	Basel
Decker 37' (1:1); Wirz 69' (2:1)	Summary	11' (o.g. 0:1) Foglia

St. Jakob Stadium, Basel
Attendance: 1,000
Referee: (Switzerland) Roland David (Lausanne)
- Note: corners 0:18

16 October 1960

Aarau	1–3	Lengnau
Goal	FCA summary	Goal

Stadion Brügglifeld, Aarau

16 October 1960

FC Forward Morges	0–2	Servette
	Servette summary	(0:1) Heuri (0:2) Fatton

Parc des Sports, Morges

6 November 1960

St. Gallen	1–4	Zürich
Werner Knobloch 5' (1:1)	FCZ summary	4' (0:1) Reutlinger; 7' (1:2) Leimgruber; 28' (1:3) Leimgruber; 80' (1:4) Pastega

Espenmoos, St. Gallen
Attendance: 3,500
Referee: (Switzerland) Claude Stettler (Feuerthalen)

== Round 4 ==
=== Summary ===
Team 1	Score	Team 2
12 November 1960
La Chaux-de-Fonds	3–1	Lengnau
Zürich	6–0	SV Höngg
13 November 1960
Schaffhausen	4–2	Blue Stars
Grenchen	ppd	FC Porrentruy
Concordia	2–1	Bern
Cantonal Neuchâtel	3–0	Le Locle-Sports
Yverdon-Sport	2–2 (a.e.t.)	Urania Genève Sport
Urania Genève Sport	2–1	Yverdon-Sport
Martigny-Sports	1–1 (a.e.t.)	Signal FC (Bernex)
Thun	4–0	Old Boys
Biel-Bienne	3–1	Young Boys
Chiasso	3–1	Bellinzona
Brühl	0–3	Winterthur
Grasshopper Club	1–2	Young Fellows
Servette	4–0	Sion
Lugano	1–4	Luzern
Vevey Sports	1–1 (a.e.t.)	Lausanne-Sport

Replays

Team 1	Score	Team 2
20 November 1960
Signal FC (Bernex)	2–4	Martigny-Sports
30 November 1960
Lausanne-Sport	1–1 (a.e.t.)	Vevey Sports
4 December 1960
Grenchen	3–1	FC Porrentruy
7 December 1960
Urania Genève Sport	2–1	Yverdon-Sport

Second replay

Team 1	Score	Team 2
14 December 1960
Lausanne-Sport	2–1 (a.e.t.)	Vevey Sports

=== Matches ===
12 November 1960

Zürich	6–0	SV Höngg
Leimgruber 1' (1:0); Pastega (0:2); Waldner 18' (3:0); Leimgruber 45' (4:0); X. Stierli 80' (5:0); Wüthrich 86' (6:0)	FCZ summary

Letzigrund, Zürich
Attendance: 1,200
Referee: (Switzerland) Fritz Schorer (Interlaken)

13 November 1960

Servette	4–0	Sion
(o.g.); 2x Fatton; 1x Németh	Servette summary

Stade des Charmilles, Geneva

== Round 5 ==
=== Summary ===
Team 1	Score	Team 2
18 December 1960
Schaffhausen	0–0 (a.e.t.)	Grenchen
Concordia	1–2	Cantonal Neuchâtel
Urania Genève Sport	0–1	La Chaux-de-Fonds
Martigny-Sports	2–2 (a.e.t.)	Lausanne-Sport
Thun	3–4 (a.e.t.)	Biel-Bienne
Chiasso	1–0	Winterthur
Young Fellows	2–0	Servette
Luzern	1–0	Zürich

Replays

Team 1	Score	Team 2
8 January 1961
Grenchen	0–1	Schaffhausen
12 February 1961
Lausanne-Sport	0–0 (a.e.t.)	Martigny-Sports

Second replay

Team 1	Score	Team 2
19 February 1961
Lausanne-Sport	2–0	Martigny-Sports

=== Matches ===
18 December 1960

Young Fellows	2–0	Servette
Goal	Servette summary

Utogrund, Zürich

18 December 1960

Luzern	1–0	Zürich
Frey 58' (1:0)	FCZ summary

Stadion Allmend, Lucerne
Attendance: 8,800
Referee: (Switzerland) Albert Guinnard (Gletterens)

== Quarter-finals ==
=== Summary ===
Team 1	Score	Team 2
19 February 1961
Cantonal Neuchâtel	1–1	Schaffhausen
26 February 1961
La Chaux-de-Fonds	4–1	Lausanne-Sport
Chiasso	2–2 *	Biel-Bienne
Young Fellows	0–3	Luzern

- Note; the match Chiasso–Biel-Bienne was played at Stadion Gurzelen in Biel/Bienne

Replay

Team 1	Score	Team 2
26 February 1961
Schaffhausen	6–1	Cantonal Neuchâtel
19 March 1961
Biel-Bienne	1–0	Chiasso

== Semi-finals ==
=== Summary ===
Team 1	Score	Team 2
3 April 1961
Schaffhausen	0–2	La Chaux-de-Fonds
Biel-Bienne	3–1	Luzern

=== Matches ===
3 April 1961

Schaffhausen	0–2	La Chaux-de-Fonds
	summary	10' (0:1) Bertschi; 19' (0:2) Antenen

Stadion Breite, Schaffhausen

3 April 1961

Biel-Bienne	3–1	Luzern
25' (pen.); Stäuble 61' (2:1); Edgar Graf 69' (3:1)	summary	31' (1:1) Künzle

Stadion Gurzelen, Biel/Bienne

== Final ==
The final was held at the former Wankdorf Stadium in Bern on Sunday 23 April 1961.

=== Summary ===
Team 1	Score	Team 2
23 April 1961
La Chaux-de-Fonds	1–0	Biel-Bienne

=== Telegram ===
23 April 1961
15:00

La Chaux-de-Fonds	1–0	Biel-Bienne
Frigerio 45' (1:0)	Fussball-Schweiz summary

Wankdorf Stadium, Bern
Attendance: 20,000
Referee: (Switzerland) Fritz Schorer (Interlaken)

La Chaux-de-Fonds won the cup and this was the club's sixth cup title to this date.

== Further in Swiss football ==
- 1960–61 Nationalliga A
- 1960–61 Swiss 1. Liga

== Sources ==
- Fussball-Schweiz
- FCB Cup games 1960–61 at fcb-achiv.ch
- Switzerland 1960–61 at RSSSF

Preceded by 1959–60	Swiss Cup seasons	Succeeded by 1961–62
