= Otto Ludwig =

Otto Ludwig may refer to:

- Otto Ludwig (writer) (1813–1865), German novelist and dramatist
- Otto Ludwig (film editor) (1903–1983), German film editor active in British inter-war films
- Otto Ludwig (footballer) (1934–2014), German footballer
