= 1961–62 Swiss 1. Liga =

1. Liga
- Season: 1961–62
- Champions: 1. Liga champions: FC Moutier; Group West: Cantonal Neuchâtel; Group Cenral: FC Moutier; Group South and East: FC Baden
- Promoted: FC Moutier; Cantonal Neuchâtel
- Relegated: Group West: FC Bözingen 34; Group Central: FC Breitenbach; Group South and East: SV Höngg
- Matches: 3 times 144 plus 3 play-offs

The 1961–62 1. Liga season was the 30th season of the 1. Liga since its creation in 1931. At this time, the 1. Liga was the third-tier of the Swiss football league system and it was the highest level of total amateur football. At this time the clubs in the two higher divisions in Switzerland were beginning to employ professional or moreover semi-professional players.

== Format ==
There were 36 teams competing in the 1. Liga 1961–62 season. They were divided into three regional groups, each group with 12 teams. Within each group, the teams would play a double round-robin to decide their league position. Two points were awarded for a win. The three group winners then contested a play-off round to decide the two promotion slots. The last placed team in each group were relegated to the 2. Liga (fourth tier). The groups were to be stocked up, each with one additional club for the next season, therefore these three relegated teams would be replaced by six promoted teams from the 2. Liga.

== Group West ==
=== Teams, locations ===
Club	Based in	Canton	Stadium	Capacity
FC Bözingen 34	Biel/Bienne	Bern	Längfeld	1,000
FC Cantonal Neuchâtel	Neuchâtel	Neuchâtel	Stade de la Maladière	25,500
Étoile Carouge FC	Carouge	Geneva	Stade de la Fontenette	3,690
FC Le Locle	Le Locle	Neuchâtel	Installation sportive - Jeanneret	3,142
FC Lengnau	Lengnau	Bern	Moos Lengnau BE	3,900
ES FC Malley	Malley	Vaud	Centre sportif de la Tuilière	1,500
FC Monthey	Monthey	Valais	Stade Philippe Pottier	1,800
FC Forward Morges	Morges	Vaud	Parc des Sports	600
FC Raron	Raron	Valais	Sportplatz Rhoneglut	1,000
FC Sierre	Sierre	Valais	Complexe Ecossia	2,000
FC Versoix	Versoix	Geneva	Centre sportif de la Bécassière	1,000
FC Xamax	Neuchâtel	Neuchâtel	Stade de la Maladière	25,500

=== Final league table ===
Pos	Team	Pld	W	D	L	GF	GA	GD	BP	Pts	Qualification or relegation
1	FC Cantonal Neuchâtel	22	17	4	1	55	15	+40	0	38	Play-off to Nationalliga B
2	FC Le Locle	22	15	1	6	57	27	+30	0	31	
3	FC Xamax	22	14	3	5	66	40	+26	−8	23	
4	FC Monthey	22	11	1	10	60	44	+16	0	23	
5	Etoile Carouge FC	22	9	3	10	47	46	+1	0	21	
6	FC Sierre	22	9	2	11	34	48	−14	0	20	
7	FC Raron	22	7	5	10	38	44	−6	0	19	
8	FC Forward Morges	22	7	5	10	29	41	−12	0	19	
9	FC Versoix	22	8	1	13	32	45	−13	0	17	
10	FC Lengnau	22	7	3	12	27	47	−20	0	17	
11	ES FC Malley	22	5	5	12	22	43	−21	0	15	
12	FC Bözingen 34	22	5	3	14	35	62	−27	0	13	Relegation to 2. Liga

Source: RSSSF
Rules for classification: 1) Points; 2) Goal difference within the league, but decider play-off for qualifiers.

Xamax had 8 points deducted because they had been accused by former coach Vidjak of paying illegal bonuses to the players.

== Group Central ==
=== Teams, locations ===
Club	Based in	Canton	Stadium	Capacity
FC Alle	Alle	Jura	Centre Sportif Régional	2,000
FC Breitenbach	Breitenbach	Solothurn	Grien	2,000
SC Burgdorf	Burgdorf	Bern	Stadion Neumatt	3,850
FC Concordia Basel	Basel	Basel-Stadt	Stadion Rankhof	7,000
SR Delémont	Delémont	Jura	La Blancherie	5,263
FC Emmenbrücke	Emmen	Lucerne	Stadion Gersag	8,700
FC Langenthal	Langenthal	Bern	Rankmatte	2,000
FC Moutier	Moutier	Bern	Stade de Chalière	5,000
FC Nordstern Basel	Basel	Basel-Stadt	Rankhof	7,600
BSC Old Boys	Basel	Basel-Stadt	Stadion Schützenmatte	8,000
FC Solothurn	Solothurn	Solothurn	Stadion FC Solothurn	6,750
FC Wohlen	Wohlen	Aargau	Stadion Niedermatten	3,734

=== Final league table ===
Pos	Team	Pld	W	D	L	GF	GA	GD	Pts	Qualification or relegation
1	FC Moutier	22	13	6	3	52	32	+20	32	Play-off to Nationalliga B
2	SR Delémont	22	13	3	6	43	32	+11	29	
3	FC Nordstern Basel	22	9	8	5	31	17	+14	26	
4	FC Alle	22	11	4	7	48	35	+13	26	
5	FC Solothurn	22	7	10	5	27	25	+2	24	
6	FC Concordia Basel	22	8	6	8	48	39	+9	22	
7	FC Emmenbrücke	22	9	3	10	41	41	0	21	
8	SC Burgdorf	22	7	6	9	41	47	−6	20	
9	FC Wohlen	22	5	8	9	34	49	−15	18	
10	FC Langenthal	22	6	5	11	32	39	−7	17	
11	BSC Old Boys	22	4	8	10	23	40	−17	16	
12	FC Breitenbach	22	6	1	15	37	61	−24	13	Relegation to 2. Liga

Source: RSSSF
Rules for classification: 1) Points; 2) Goal difference within the league, but decider play-off for qualifiers.

== Group South and East ==
=== Teams, locations ===
Club	Based in	Canton	Stadium	Capacity
FC Baden	Baden	Aargau	Esp Stadium	7,000
FC Blue Stars Zürich	Zürich	Zürich	Hardhof	1,000
FC Dietikon	Dietikon	Zürich	Fussballplatz Dornau	1,000
SV Höngg	Zürich	Zürich	Hönggerberg	1,000
FC Locarno	Locarno	Ticino	Stadio comunale Lido	5,000
FC Oerlikon/Polizei ZH	Oerlikon (Zürich)	Zürich	Sportanlage Neudorf	1,000
FC Rapid Lugano	Lugano	Ticino	Cornaredo Stadium	6,330
FC Red Star Zürich	Zürich	Zürich	Allmend Brunau	2,000
FC Solduno	Locarno	Ticino	Campo Morettina / Stadio del Lido	1,000 / 5,000
FC St. Gallen	St. Gallen	St. Gallen	Espenmoos	11,000
FC Vaduz	Vaduz	Liechtenstein	Rheinpark Stadion	7,584
FC Wettingen	Wettingen	Aargau	Stadion Altenburg	10,000

=== Final league table ===
Pos	Team	Pld	W	D	L	GF	GA	GD	Pts	Qualification or relegation
1	FC Baden	22	15	4	3	63	28	+35	34	Play-off to Nationalliga B
2	FC Dietikon	22	14	3	5	60	38	+22	31	
3	FC St. Gallen	22	14	2	6	56	36	+20	30	
4	FC Rapid Lugano	22	7	9	6	34	31	+3	23	
5	FC Red Star Zürich	22	10	2	10	53	40	+13	22	
6	FC Wettingen	22	9	4	9	42	40	+2	22	
7	FC Locarno	22	8	5	9	40	40	0	21	
8	FC Vaduz	22	8	5	9	44	50	−6	21	
9	FC Oerlikon/Polizei ZH	22	8	4	10	37	46	−9	20	
10	FC Blue Stars Zürich	22	7	4	11	42	54	−12	18	
11	FC Solduno	22	5	2	15	30	58	−28	12	
12	SV Höngg	22	4	2	16	24	64	−40	10	Relegation to 2. Liga

Source: RSSSF
Rules for classification: 1) Points; 2) Goal difference within the league, but decider play-off for qualifiers.

== Promotion play-off ==
The three group winners played single a round-robin for the two promotion slots and for the championship.

=== Round-robin ===
Pos	Team	Pld	W	D	L	GF	GA	GD	Pts	MOU	CN	BAD
1	FC Moutier	2	2	0	0	3	1	+2	4	—	2–1	—
2	Cantonal Neuchâtel	2	1	0	1	4	3	+1	2	—	—	3–1
3	Baden	2	0	0	2	1	4	−3	0	0–1	—	—

Source: RSSSF
Rules for classification: 1) Points; 2) Head-to-head 3) Decider.

FC Moutier were declaired 1. Liga champions. The champions and the runners-up Cantonal Neuchâtel were promoted to 1962–63 Nationalliga B.

== Further in Swiss football ==
- 1961–62 Nationalliga A
- 1961–62 Nationalliga B
- 1961–62 Swiss Cup

== Sources ==
- Switzerland 1961–62 at RSSSF

Preceded by 1960–61	Seasons in Swiss 1. Liga	Succeeded by 1962–63
