= 1962–63 Swiss 1. Liga =

1. Liga
- Season: 1962–63
- Champions: 1. Liga champions: FC Solothurn; Group West: Etoile Carouge; Group Cenral: FC Solothurn; Group South and East: FC Locarno
- Promoted: FC Solothurn; Etoile Carouge
- Relegated: Group West: FC Monthey; FC Sierre; Group Central: FC Breite Basel; FC Lengnau; Group South and East: FC Solduno; FC Bülach
- Matches: 3 times 156 and 1 decider plus 6 play-offs

The 1962–63 1. Liga season was the 31st season of the 1. Liga since its creation in 1931. At this time, the 1. Liga was the third-tier of the Swiss football league system and it was the highest level of total amateur football. At this time the clubs in the two higher divisions in Switzerland were beginning to employ professional or moreover semi-professional players.

== Format ==
There were 39 teams competing in the 1. Liga 1962–63 season. They were divided into three regional groups, each group with 13 teams. Within each group, the teams would play a double round-robin to decide their league position. Two points were awarded for a win. The three group winners then contested a play-off round to decide the two promotion slots. The last two placed teams in each group were relegated to the 2. Liga (fourth tier).

== Group West ==
=== Teams, locations ===
Club	Based in	Canton	Stadium	Capacity
Étoile Carouge FC	Carouge	Geneva	Stade de la Fontenette	3,690
FC Le Locle	Le Locle	Neuchâtel	Installation sportive - Jeanneret	3,142
ES FC Malley	Malley	Vaud	Centre sportif de la Tuilière	1,500
FC Martigny-Sports	Martigny	Valais	Stade d'Octodure	2,500
FC Monthey	Monthey	Valais	Stade Philippe Pottier	1,800
FC Forward Morges	Morges	Vaud	Parc des Sports	600
FC Raron	Raron	Valais	Sportplatz Rhoneglut	1,000
FC Renens	Renens	Vaud	Zone sportive du Censuy	2,300
FC Sierre	Sierre	Valais	Complexe Ecossia	2,000
FC Stade Lausanne	Ouchy, Lausanne	Vaud	Centre sportif de Vidy	1,000
FC Versoix	Versoix	Geneva	Centre sportif de la Bécassière	1,000
Xamax	Neuchâtel	Neuchâtel	Stade de la Maladière	25,500
Yverdon-Sport FC	Yverdon-les-Bains	Vaud	Stade Municipal	6,600

=== Final league table ===
Pos	Team	Pld	W	D	L	GF	GA	GD	Pts	Qualification or relegation
1	Etoile Carouge FC	24	15	5	4	60	34	+26	35	To decider for first place
2	FC Versoix	24	15	5	4	47	23	+24	35	To decider for first place
3	Xamax	24	12	7	5	54	33	+21	31	
4	FC Le Locle	24	11	8	5	56	31	+25	30	
5	Yverdon-Sport FC	24	12	5	7	58	30	+28	29	
6	FC Stade Lausanne	24	10	8	6	38	32	+6	28	
7	ES FC Malley	24	9	6	9	38	43	−5	24	
8	FC Raron	24	9	3	12	35	36	−1	21	
9	FC Renens	24	6	6	12	23	47	−24	18	
10	FC Martigny-Sports	24	3	11	10	24	33	−9	17	
11	FC Forward Morges	24	5	7	12	23	43	−20	17	
12	FC Monthey	24	5	6	13	28	58	−30	16	Relegation to 2. Liga Interregional
13	FC Sierre	24	2	7	15	33	74	−41	11	Relegation to 2. Liga Interregional

Source: RSSSF
Rules for classification: 1) Points; 2) Goal difference within the league, but decider play-off for qualifiers.

=== Decider for first place ===
The decider match for the group winners was played on 22 June at Stade de Frontenex in Genève.

Team 1	Score	Team 2
Etoile Carouge	1–0	Versoix

Etoile Carouge won and advanced to play-offs. Versoix remained in the division.

== Group Central ==
=== Teams, locations ===
Club	Based in	Canton	Stadium	Capacity
FC Alle	Alle	Jura	Centre Sportif Régional	2,000
FC Breite Basel	Basel	Basel-Stadt	Stadion Schützenmatte / Landhof	8,000 / 7,000
SC Burgdorf	Burgdorf	Bern	Stadion Neumatt	3,850
FC Concordia Basel	Basel	Basel-Stadt	Stadion Rankhof	7,000
SR Delémont	Delémont	Jura	La Blancherie	5,263
FC Emmenbrücke	Emmen	Lucerne	Stadion Gersag	8,700
FC Gerlafingen	Gerlafingen	Solothurn	Kirchacker	1,000
FC Langenthal	Langenthal	Bern	Rankmatte	2,000
FC Lengnau	Lengnau	Bern	Moos Lengnau BE	3,900
FC Nordstern Basel	Basel	Basel-Stadt	Rankhof	7,600
BSC Old Boys	Basel	Basel-Stadt	Stadion Schützenmatte	8,000
FC Solothurn	Solothurn	Solothurn	Stadion FC Solothurn	6,750
FC Wohlen	Wohlen	Aargau	Stadion Niedermatten	3,734

=== Final league table ===
Pos	Team	Pld	W	D	L	GF	GA	GD	Pts	Qualification or relegation
1	FC Solothurn	24	15	8	1	57	24	+33	38	Play-off to Nationalliga B
2	FC Concordia Basel	24	10	8	6	55	40	+15	28	
3	SR Delémont	24	12	4	8	41	30	+11	28	
4	FC Emmenbrücke	24	11	5	8	60	43	+17	27	
5	FC Alle	24	11	5	8	39	37	+2	27	
6	FC Gerlafingen	24	11	5	8	37	36	+1	27	
7	BSC Old Boys	24	8	9	7	33	33	0	25	
8	FC Langenthal	24	8	8	8	49	45	+4	24	
9	SC Burgdorf	24	7	8	9	42	44	−2	22	
10	FC Nordstern Basel	24	7	7	10	46	49	−3	21	
11	FC Wohlen	24	7	6	11	29	46	−17	20	
12	FC Breite Basel	24	4	10	10	36	38	−2	18	Relegation to 2. Liga Interregional
13	Lengnau	24	3	1	20	23	82	−59	7	Relegation to 2. Liga Interregional

Source: RSSSF
Rules for classification: 1) Points; 2) Goal difference within the league, but decider play-off for qualifiers.

== Group South and East ==
=== Teams, locations ===
Club	Based in	Canton	Stadium	Capacity
FC Baden	Baden	Aargau	Esp Stadium	7,000
FC Blue Stars Zürich	Zürich	Zürich	Hardhof	1,000
FC Bülach	Bülach	Zürich	Stadion Erachfeld	3,500
FC Dietikon	Dietikon	Zürich	Fussballplatz Dornau	1,000
FC Küsnacht	Küsnacht	Zürich	Sportanlage Heslibach	2,300
FC Locarno	Locarno	Ticino	Stadio comunale Lido	5,000
FC Rapid Lugano	Lugano	Ticino	Cornaredo Stadium	6,330
FC Oerlikon/Polizei ZH	Oerlikon (Zürich)	Zürich	Sportanlage Neudorf	1,000
FC Red Star Zürich	Zürich	Zürich	Allmend Brunau	2,000
FC Solduno	Locarno	Ticino	Campo Morettina / Stadio del Lido	1,000 / 5,000
FC St. Gallen	St. Gallen	St. Gallen	Espenmoos	11,000
FC Wettingen	Wettingen	Aargau	Stadion Altenburg	10,000
FC Vaduz	Vaduz	Liechtenstein	Rheinpark Stadion	7,584

=== Final league table ===
Pos	Team	Pld	W	D	L	GF	GA	GD	Pts	Qualification or relegation
1	FC Locarno	24	15	5	4	48	23	+25	35	Play-off to Nationalliga B
2	FC Baden	24	15	4	5	64	32	+32	34	
3	FC Vaduz	24	14	3	7	71	44	+27	31	
4	FC Wettingen	24	11	5	8	56	40	+16	27	
5	FC Dietikon	24	10	5	9	40	42	−2	25	
6	FC Rapid Lugano	24	11	3	10	35	48	−13	25	
7	FC Red Star Zürich	24	10	4	10	51	46	+5	24	
8	FC Küsnacht	24	10	4	10	33	40	−7	24	
9	FC St. Gallen	24	9	5	10	57	55	+2	23	
10	FC Oerlikon/Polizei ZH	24	9	3	12	49	51	−2	21	
11	FC Blue Stars Zürich	24	6	6	12	56	66	−10	18	
12	FC Solduno	24	4	5	15	32	76	−44	13	Relegation to 2. Liga Interregional
13	FC Bülach	24	3	6	15	39	68	−29	12	Relegation to 2. Liga Interregional

Source: RSSSF
Rules for classification: 1) Points; 2) Goal difference within the league, but decider play-off for qualifiers.

== Promotion play-off ==
The three group winners played single a round-robin for the two promotion slots and for the championship.

=== Round-robin ===
Pos	Team	Pld	W	D	L	GF	GA	GD	Pts	LOC	ETO	SOL
1	Locarno	2	1	0	1	4	2	+2	2	—	—	4–0
2	Etoile Carouge	2	1	0	1	4	3	+1	2	2–0	—	—
3	Solothurn	2	1	0	1	3	6	−3	2	—	3–2	—

Source: RSSSF
Rules for classification: 1) Points; 2) Head-to-head 3) Decider.

=== Replay ===
A replay round-robin was required, due to the egality of the teams

Pos	Team	Pld	W	D	L	GF	GA	GD	Pts	SOL	ETO	LOC
1	Solothurn	2	1	1	0	4	2	+2	3	—	—	3–1
2	Etoile Carouge	2	0	2	0	2	2	0	2	1–1	—	—
3	Locarno	2	0	1	1	2	4	−2	1	—	1–1	—

Source: RSSSF
Rules for classification: 1) Points; 2) Head-to-head 3) Decider.

FC Solothurn became 1. Liga champions. The champions and the runners-up Etoile Carouge were promoted to 1963–64 Nationalliga B.

== Further in Swiss football ==
- 1962–63 Nationalliga A
- 1962–63 Nationalliga B
- 1962–63 Swiss Cup

== Sources ==
- Switzerland 1962–63 at RSSSF

Preceded by 1961–62	Seasons in Swiss 1. Liga	Succeeded by 1963–64
