= 1962–63 International Football Cup =

Tournament details
- Teams: 32

Final positions
- Champions: (Czechoslovakia) Slovnaft Bratislava (1st title)
- Runners-up: (Italy) Padova

The 1962–63 International Football Cup was won by Slovnaft Bratislava after defeating Calcio Padova in the final. A total of 32 clubs contested the tournament, including the first clubs from France, Italy, Hungary and Yugoslavia to participate in the Intertoto Cup.

== Teams location ==
Location of teams of the 1962–63 International Football Cup group stage.
Brown: Group A1; Red: Group A2; Orange: Group A3; Yellow: Group A4;
Green: Group B1; Blue: Group B2; Purple: Group B3; Pink: Group B4.

== Group stage ==
The teams were divided into eight groups of four clubs each. The groups were themselves divided geographically as 'A' for eastern countries (Austria, Czechoslovakia, East Germany, and Poland) and 'B' for western countries (the Netherlands, Sweden and Switzerland). Teams from West Germany were placed in both sections. The eight group winners (in bold in the tables below) advanced to the knock-out rounds, with the four 'A' winners being drawn against the four 'B' winners.

=== Group A1 ===
Pos	Team	Pld	W	D	L	GF	GA	GD	Pts	BRA	PAR	VEN	YB
1	(Czechoslovakia) Slovnaft Bratislava (A)	6	4	0	2	14	10	+4	**8**	—	4–2	2–0	1–0
2	(France) RCF Paris	6	2	3	1	20	18	+2	**7**	4–2	—	3–3	3–1
3	(Italy) Venezia	6	2	2	2	18	14	+4	**6**	4–1	4–4	—	6–1
4	(Switzerland) Young Boys	6	1	1	4	9	19	−10	**3**	0–4	4–4	3–1	—

Source: mogiel.net
Rules for classification: 1) Points; 2) Goal difference; 3) Goals scored; 4) Head-to-head points; 5) Away goals scored; 6) Draw.
(A) Advanced to quarter-finals

=== Group A2 ===
Pos	Team	Pld	W	D	L	GF	GA	GD	Pts
1	(Hungary) Újpesti Dózsa (A)	6	4	2	0	14	5	+9	**10**
2	(France) Stade Français Paris	6	3	1	2	9	5	+4	**7**
3	(Italy) Mantova	6	2	0	4	7	16	−9	**4**
4	(Czechoslovakia) ČKD Praha	6	1	1	4	11	15	−4	**3**

Source: mogiel.net
Rules for classification: 1) Points; 2) Goal difference; 3) Goals scored; 4) Head-to-head points; 5) Away goals scored; 6) Draw.
(A) Advanced to quarter-finals

=== Group A3 ===
Pos	Team	Pld	W	D	L	GF	GA	GD	Pts	PAD	DOR	CDF	PLZ
1	(Italy) Padova (A)	6	4	1	1	15	8	+7	**9**	—	1–0	4–2	5–0
2	(Hungary) Dorogi Bányász	6	3	0	3	13	13	0	**6**	3–1	—	4–1	4–2
3	(Switzerland) La Chaux-de-Fonds	6	2	1	3	10	13	−3	**5**	2–3	1–0	—	3–1
4	(Czechoslovakia) Spartak Plzeň	6	1	2	3	12	16	−4	**4**	1–1	7–2	1–1	—

Source: mogiel.net
Rules for classification: 1) Points; 2) Goal difference; 3) Goals scored; 4) Head-to-head points; 5) Away goals scored; 6) Draw.
(A) Advanced to quarter-finals

=== Group A4 ===
Pos	Team	Pld	W	D	L	GF	GA	GD	Pts	SER	SAR	NIT	NÎM
1	(Switzerland) Servette (A)	6	3	2	1	11	9	+2	**8**	—	3–2	2–1	4–1
2	(Socialist Federal Republic of Yugoslavia) Sarajevo	6	2	2	2	9	12	−3	**6**	0–0	—	3–2	2–1
3	(Czechoslovakia) Nitra	6	2	1	3	12	9	+3	**5**	0–0	5–1	—	4–1
4	(France) Nîmes	6	2	1	3	11	13	−2	**5**	5–2	1–1	2–0	—

Source: mogiel.net
Rules for classification: 1) Points; 2) Goal difference; 3) Goals scored; 4) Head-to-head points; 5) Away goals scored; 6) Draw.
(A) Advanced to quarter-finals

=== Group B1 ===
Pos	Team	Pld	W	D	L	GF	GA	GD	Pts
1	(Hungary) Tatabánya (A)	6	5	1	0	18	7	+11	**11**
2	(Netherlands) Ajax	6	4	0	2	18	11	+7	**8**
3	(France) Nancy	6	2	0	4	10	12	−2	**4**
4	(West Germany) Kaiserslautern	6	0	1	5	9	25	−16	**1**

(A) Advanced to quarter-finals

=== Group B2 ===
Pos	Team	Pld	W	D	L	GF	GA	GD	Pts
1	(Socialist Federal Republic of Yugoslavia) OFK Belgrade (A)	6	4	1	1	13	9	+4	**9**
2	(Italy) Lanerossi Vicenza	6	3	0	3	8	9	−1	**6**
3	(West Germany) Bayern Munich	6	2	1	3	14	19	−5	**5**
4	(Netherlands) Feyenoord	6	2	0	4	12	10	+2	**4**

(A) Advanced to quarter-finals

=== Group B3 ===
Pos	Team	Pld	W	D	L	GF	GA	GD	Pts	RIJ	OBE	BAS	PSV
1	(Socialist Federal Republic of Yugoslavia) Rijeka (A)	6	4	1	1	18	11	+7	**9**	—	2–1	5–1	3–1
2	(West Germany) Rot-Weiß Oberhausen	6	3	2	1	15	12	+3	**8**	4–3	—	2–2	3–1
3	(Switzerland) Basel	6	1	3	2	16	20	−4	**5**	2–2	4–4	—	4–3
4	(Netherlands) PSV	6	1	0	5	11	17	−6	**2**	2–3	0–1	4–3	—

Source: mogiel.net
Rules for classification: 1) Points; 2) Goal difference; 3) Goals scored; 4) Head-to-head points; 5) Away goals scored; 6) Draw.
(A) Advanced to quarter-finals

=== Group B4 ===
Pos	Team	Pld	W	D	L	GF	GA	GD	Pts
1	(Hungary) Pécsi Dózsa (A)	6	5	1	0	17	7	+10	**11**
2	(Netherlands) Blauw Wit	6	2	2	2	10	12	−2	**6**
3	(Socialist Federal Republic of Yugoslavia) Velež Mostar	6	2	1	3	16	11	+5	**5**
4	(West Germany) VfV Hildesheim	6	1	0	5	8	21	−13	**2**

Source: mogiel.net
Rules for classification: 1) Points; 2) Goal difference; 3) Goals scored; 4) Head-to-head points; 5) Away goals scored; 6) Draw.
(A) Advanced to quarter-finals

== Quarter-finals ==
Team 1	Agg.	Team 2	1st leg	2nd leg
Servette (Switzerland)	1–6	(Hungary) Tatabánya	1–0	0–6
Pécsi Dózsa (Hungary)	4–3	(Socialist Federal Republic of Yugoslavia) Rijeka	2–1	2–2
Padova (Italy)	10–5	(Socialist Federal Republic of Yugoslavia) OFK Belgrade	7–1	3–4
Újpesti Dózsa (Hungary)	2–4	(Czechoslovakia) Slovnaft Bratislava	1–0	1–4

15 August 1962
First leg

Servette (Switzerland)	1–0	(Hungary) Tatabánya
Mekhloufi 82'

Charmilles Stadium, Geneva
Attendance: 13,000
Referee: (Germany) Rudolf Kreitlein

22 August 1962
Second leg

Tatabánya (Hungary)	6–0	(Switzerland) Servette
Szovják 11', 51'; Bíró 54', 66'; Sátori 77'; Csernai 80'

Stadion Gyula Grosics, Tatabánya
Attendance: 13,000
Referee: (Austria) Friedrich Mayer

Tatabánya win 6–1 on aggregate and continue to semi-finals.

== Semi-finals ==
Team 1	Agg.	Team 2	1st leg	2nd leg
Padova (Italy)	7–3	(Hungary) Pécsi Dózsa	4–3	3–0
Slovnaft Bratislava (Czechoslovakia)	3–2	(Hungary) Tatabánya	1–1	2–1

== Final ==
Played over one leg, in Padova.

Team 1	Score	Team 2
Padova (Italy)	0–1	(Czechoslovakia) Slovnaft Bratislava

3 April 1963

Padova (Italy)	0 – 1	(Czechoslovakia) Slovnaft Bratislava
		Scherer 88' (pen.)

Padua
Attendance: 5,000
Referee: Keller (Switzerland)

== See also ==
- 1962–63 European Cup
- 1962–63 UEFA Cup Winners' Cup
- 1962–63 Inter-Cities Fairs Cup
