= Robert Hosp =

Swiss footballer (1939–2021)

Personal information
- Date of birth: 13 December 1939
- Place of birth: Switzerland
- Date of death: 5 October 2021 (aged 81)
- Height: 1.74 m (5 ft 9 in)
- Position: Forward

Senior career*
Years	Team	Apps	(Gls)
1957–1959	FC Concordia Basel		
1959–1971	Lausanne-Sport		
- CS Chênois

International career
1960–1967	Switzerland	16	(2)
- * Club domestic league appearances and goals

Robert Hosp (13 December 1939 – 5 October 2021) was a Swiss footballer who played as a forward. He represented the Switzerland national team at the 1966 FIFA World Cup. At club level, he most notably played for FC Lausanne-Sport.

Hosp died on 5 October 2021, at the age of 81.
