= Utogrund =

Stadium in Zurich

Coordinates: 47.3789°N 8.4969°E

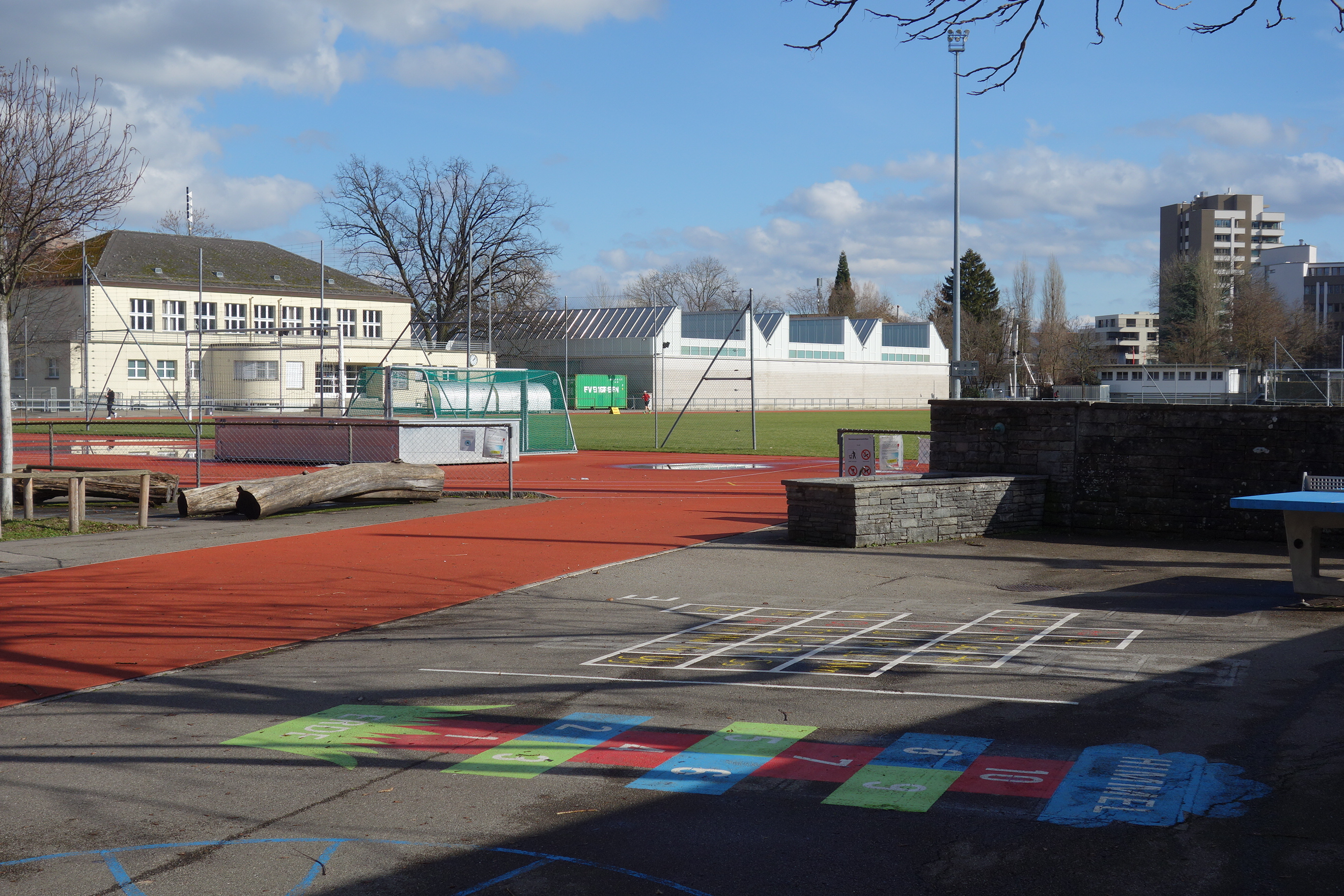
- Sportanlage Utogrund Dennlerstr
- Interactive map of Utogrund
- Location: Zurich
- Capacity: 2,800

Tenants
- SC YF Juventus

Utogrund is a football stadium in Zurich, Switzerland. It is the home ground for SC YF Juventus and has a capacity of 2,800.
