= Stade de la Maladière (1924) =

Multi-use stadium in Neuchâtel, Switzerland

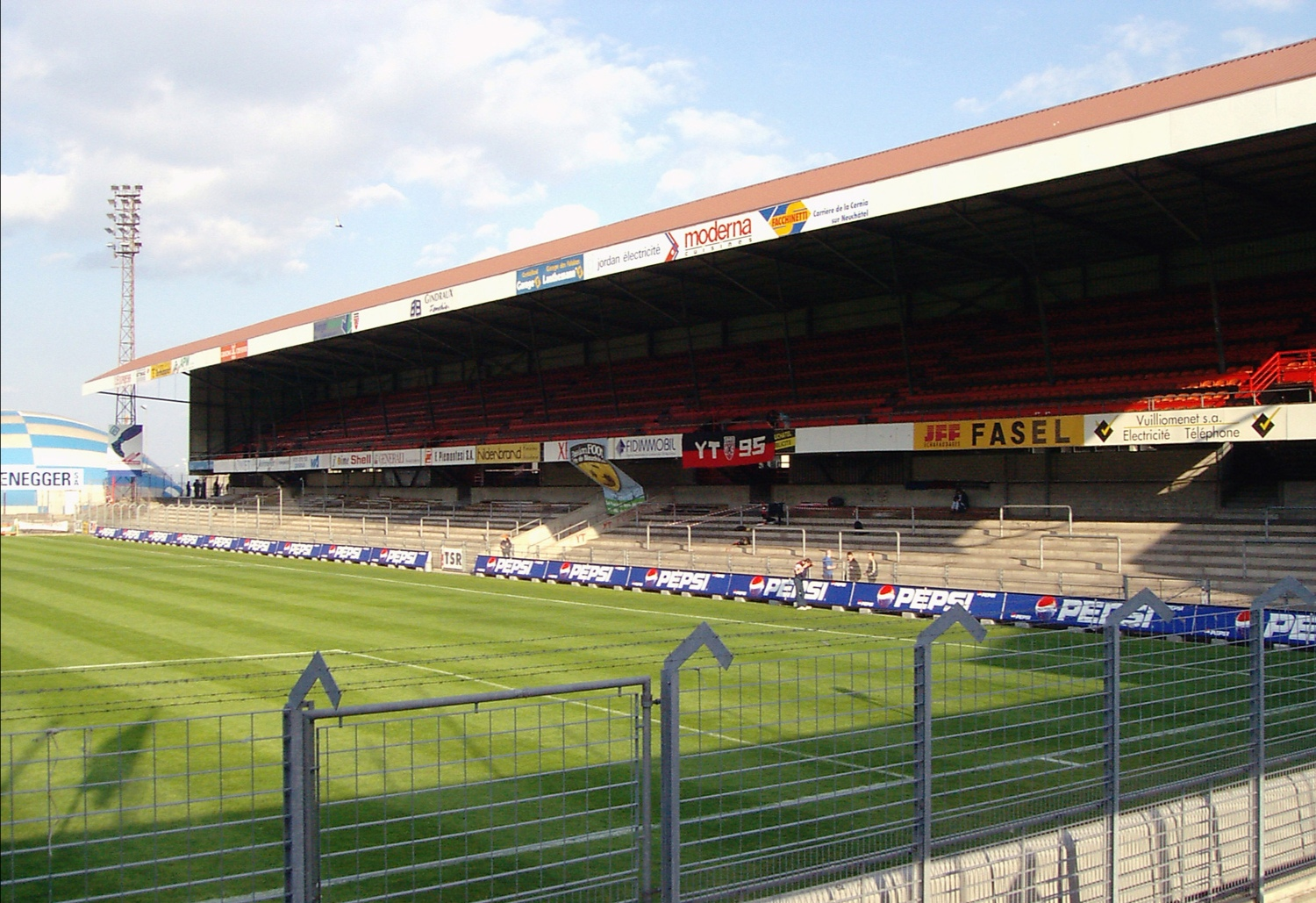
- Interactive map of Stade de la Maladière
- Full name: Stade de la Maladière
- Location: Neuchâtel, Switzerland
- Owner: Neuchâtel Xamax
- Operator: Neuchâtel Xamax
- Capacity: 22,130
- Surface: Natural Grass

Construction
- Groundbreaking: 1922
- Opened: 1924
- Closed: 2007

Tenant
- Neuchâtel Xamax

Stade de la Maladière was a multi-use stadium in Neuchâtel, Switzerland. It was initially used as the stadium of Neuchâtel Xamax matches. It was replaced by the current Stade de la Maladière in 2005. The capacity of the stadium was 25,500 spectators.

== See also ==
- List of football stadiums in Switzerland
