= Stadion Allmend =

Football stadium

- Allmend
- Interactive map of Stadion Allmend
- Location: Lucerne, Switzerland
- Coordinates: 47.033264°N 8.305187°E
- Owner: City of Lucerne
- Capacity: 13,000 (2009); 25,000 (maximum)
- Surface: Grass
- Record attendance: 26,100 (1993)
- Field size: 103.5 x 70 m

Construction
- Opened: 1934
- Renovated: 1995
- Expanded: 1957, 1981–1983

Tenant
- FC Lucerne

Stadion Allmend was a multi-purpose stadium in Lucerne, Switzerland. Its current primary use was for football matches. The stadium had a capacity of 25,000, although security concerns mandate limiting audiences to 15,000.

The stadium had been home to FC Lucerne since 1934. Over the years the stadium has undergone some transformations. In 1957 a new stand with 2500 seats was added. Between 1981 and 1983 a new grandstand was built. In 1995 the club redeveloped the North Stand.

In 2007 the Swiss Football Association decided that the stadium was no longer good enough to be used in the Swiss Super League. In light of this the club entered negotiations with the city council of Lucerne and also the private sector in order to raise the finance with which to build a new stadium. The contract has been awarded to local architects Daniele Marques and Ivan Buhler.

Apart from the planned football stadium, Swissporarena, (capacity 17,000) there were also plans for a sports centre with a gymnasium, indoor pool and fitness center. Alongside this there will also be two large residential units built in order to help the funding of this. The project was approved at a referendum on 24 February 2008.

On 30 November 2008 the voters were given a chance to approve some minor alterations. This was also passed by the people of Lucerne. The project began construction in summer 2009 and the new "Swissporarena" was finished July 2011.

== See also ==
- List of football stadiums in Switzerland
