= 1969–70 FC Basel season =

FC Basel
1969–70 season
- Chairman: Harry Thommen
- Manager: Helmut Benthaus
- Ground: St. Jakob Stadium, Basel
- Nationalliga A: Champions
- Swiss Cup: Runner-up
- European Cup: Round 1
- Cup of the Alps: Winners
- Top goalscorer: League: Hauser (14); All: Hauser (24)
- Highest home attendance: 35,000 on 27 May 1970 vs. Grasshopper Club
- Lowest home attendance: 8,000 on 30 November 1969 vs. Biel-Bienne and on 14 December 1969 vs. Wettingen and on 1 March 1970 vs St. Gallen
- Average home league attendance: 15,653

The 1969–70 season was Fussball Club Basel 1893's 76th season in their existence. It was their 24th consecutive season in the top flight of Swiss football after their promotion the season 1945–46. They played their home games in the St. Jakob Stadium.

== Overview ==
=== Pre-season ===
Helmut Benthaus was player-manager for the fifth consecutive season. There were only a few changes in the squad. Manfred Schädler and Anton Schnyder moved on to Concordia Basel, Dieter Rüefli moved to St. Gallen and Claude Iff left the squad. Ex-German international player Stefan Reisch joined from Club Brugge. Otherwise Benthaus relied on young players, Roland Paolucci, Rolf Riner and Janos Konrad came from the reserve team to help when needed in the first team. Basel played a total of 50 matches during this season. 26 of these games were in the domestic league, seven were in the Swiss Cup, two were in the European Cup, five were in the Cup of the Alps and 10 were friendly matches. Of these 10 test games nine were won and one ended in a defeat. Two test matches were played at home and eight played away.

=== Domestic league ===
14 teams contested in the 1969–70 Nationalliga A. These were the top 12 teams from the previous 1968–69 season and the two newly promoted teams Wettingen and Fribourg. The championship was played in a double round robin, the last two teams at the end of the season to be relegated. Basel played a good season. Despite a bad run with four defeats in eight games between the end of September and the beginning of December, they won 11 of the last 14 games during the second half of the season. Basel won the championship a point clear of Lausanne Sports who ended in second position and three points ahead of FC Zürich who finished third. Basel won 15 of the 26 games, drawing seven, losing four times, they scored 59 goals conceding 23. Helmut Hauser was the team's top goal scorer with 14 league goals and Walter Balmer second top scorer with 12 league goals.

=== Swiss Cup ===
On 14 September 1969 Basel started in the Swiss Cup in the round of 32 with a 10–0 home win against Minerva Bern (as result of merger later renamed Breitenrain Bern). In the round of 16 played on 12 October Basel had a home match against Grenchen which was won 3–2. In the quarter-final, played in November, Basel had a two legged tie against Xamax-Sports NE (later renamed Neuchâtel Xamax). This was won 7–2 on aggregate. The semi-final was also a two legged tie and this against Servette Genève. Basel won both legs and 6–1 on aggregate. The final was played on 18 May 1970 in the Wankdorf Stadium, but was lost against Zürich after extra time.

=== European Cup and Cup of the Alps ===
In the European Cup Basel were drawn against Scottish club Celtic. The first leg, which played on 17 September 1969 in the St. Jakob Stadium in front of 37,587 spectators, ended in a goalless draw. The return leg on 1 October in Celtic Park attracted 49,976 spectators. Celtic won the game 2–0 and advanced to the next round. In the 1969 Cup of the Alps Basel won their group and in the final they beat Bologna 3–1.

== Players ==
Note: Flags indicate national team as defined under FIFA eligibility rules; some limited exceptions apply. Players may hold more than one non-FIFA nationality.

No.	Pos.	Nation	Player
1	GK	SUI	Marcel Kunz (games: 26)
1	GK	FRA	Jean-Paul Laufenburger (games: 0)
2	DF	GER	Josef Kiefer (games: 25)
3	DF	SUI	Bruno Michaud (games/goals: 21/1)
4	MF	SUI	Peter Ramseier (games/goals: 26/2)
5	MF	SUI	Urs Siegenthaler (games: 11)
6	DF	SUI	Paul Fischli (games: 5)
7	FW	SUI	Walter Balmer (games/goals: 26/12)
8	MF	SUI	Karl Odermatt (games/goals: 26/4)
9	FW	GER	Helmut Hauser (games/goals: 24/14)

No.	Pos.	Nation	Player
10	MF	GER	Helmut Benthaus (games/goals: 23/5)
11	FW	SUI	Peter Wenger (games/goals: 23/9)
—	DF	SUI	Walter Mundschin (games: 5)
—	DF	SUI	Roland Paolucci (games: 15)
—	MF	SUI	Otto Demarmels (games/goals: 11/1)
—	MF	GER	Stefan Reisch (new (Club Brugge) games/goals: 8/1)
—	MF	SUI	Rolf Riner (new (reserves) games/goals: 8/1)
—	MF	GER	Jürgen Sundermann (games/goals: 24/9)
—	MF	SUI	Bruno Rahmen (games/goals: 8/1)
—	FW	SUI	Dieter Rüefli ((to St. Gallen) games/goals: 2/1)
—	FW	HUN	Janos Konrad ((reserves) games 0)

Players who left the squad

Note: Flags indicate national team as defined under FIFA eligibility rules; some limited exceptions apply. Players may hold more than one non-FIFA nationality.

No.	Pos.	Nation	Player
—	GK	SUI	Claude Iff (unknown)
—	DF	SUI	Manfred Schädler (to Concordia Basel)

No.	Pos.	Nation	Player
—	MF	SUI	Anton Schnyder (to Concordia Basel)

== Results ==
Legend

Win Draw Loss Postponed

=== Friendly matches ===
==== Pre-season and mid-season ====
26 July 1969 Pre-season	Basel (Switzerland)	5–3	(Switzerland) SC Brühl	Landhof, Basel
	Wenger 3' (1:0); Hauser 22' (2:0); Hauser 38' (3:1); Ramseier 72' (4:2); Balmer (5:2)	Summary	34' (2:1) Koller; 66' (3:2) Koller; 90' (5:3) Koller	Attendance: 1,200; Referee: (Switzerland) Jean Dubach Nidau

1 August 1969 Pre-season	RC Strasbourg (France)	0–1	(Switzerland) Basel	Stadion Schiltigheim
		Summary	57' (0:1) Hauser	Attendance: 4,000; Referee: (France) Joseph Fassel

6 August 1969 Uhrencup	Grenchen (Switzerland)	0–0 (5 – 3 p)	(Switzerland) Basel	Stadion Brühl, Grenchen
20:00		Summary		Attendance: 3,600; Referee: (Switzerland) Rudolf Rettig Gerlafingen
	Penalties
	Fankhauser (penalty scored) (penalty scored) (penalty scored) (penalty scored) (penalty missed)		Sundermann (penalty scored) (penalty scored) (penalty scored) (penalty scored) (penalty scored)
Note: One player from each team took five penalties. Sundermann scored with each penalty, Fankhauser sees one of his attempts held by Marcel Kunz.

9 August 1969 Uhrencup	Basel (Switzerland)	5–3	(Switzerland) Biel-Bienne	Stadion Brühl, Grenchen
20:00	Wenger 23' (1:1); Hauser 25' (2:1); Balmer 42' (3:1); Hauser 60' (4:2); Odermatt 63' (5:2)	Summary	14' (0:1) Renfer; 57' (3:2) Amez-Droz; 78' (5:3) Peters	Attendance: 7,500; Referee: (Switzerland) Rudolf Scheurer Bettlach

16 August 1969 Pre-season	Basel (Switzerland)	5–1	(Switzerland) Wettingen	Wyler Bern
	Balmer 10' (1:0); Balmer 23' (2:0); Hauser 33' (3:0); Odermatt 75' (pen. 4:0); Wenger 75' (5:0)	Summary	85' (o.g.) Michaud	Attendance: 1,500; Referee: (Switzerland) Stauffer Bern

5 November 1969 Mid-season	FC Pratteln (Switzerland)	1–2	(Switzerland) Basel	Pratteln
	Goal	Summary	Benthaus; Wenger

==== Winter break and mid-season ====
8 February 1970 Winter break	Basel (Switzerland)	4–0	(Switzerland) Young Fellows Zürich	Landhof, Basel
	Balmer 8' (1:0); Wenger 59' (2:0); Hauser 85' (3:0); Sundermann 90' (pen. 4:0)	Summary		Attendance: 1,000; Referee: (Switzerland) Peter Hänggi Aesch

14 February 1970 Winter break	Xamax (Switzerland)	0–2	(Switzerland) Basel	Stade de Serrières, Serrières
15:30		Summary	39' (0:1) Michaud; 80' (0:2) Odermatt	Attendance: 800; Referee: (Switzerland) André Favre Echallens

22 February 1970 Winter break	Thun (Switzerland)	1–3	(Switzerland) Basel	Stadion Lachen, Thun
	H. Liecht 70' (1:3)	Summary	57' (0:1) Michaud; 63' (0:2) Hauser; 69' (0:3) Balmer	Attendance: 500; Referee: (Switzerland) Stauffer Bern

21 March 1970 Mid-season	Basel (Switzerland)	2–3	(Switzerland) La Chaux-de-Fonds	Landhof, Basel
	Hauser 28' (1:0); Wenger 77' (2:3)	Summary	53' (1:1) Jeandupeux; 57' (1:2) Brossard; 61' (1:3) Brossard	Attendance: 2,000; Referee: (Switzerland) Peter Hänggi Aesch

=== Nationalliga ===
==== League matches ====
23 August 1969 Round 1	St. Gallen	1–4	Basel	Espenmoos, St. Gallen
	Rafreider 72' (1:2)	Summary	24' (0:1) Balmer; 53' (0:2) Odermatt; 79' (pen. 1:3) Sundermann; 84' (1:4) Hauser	Attendance: 9,500; Referee: (Switzerland) Pius Kamber Zürich

30 August 1969 Round 2	Basel	2–0	Bellinzona	St. Jakob Stadium, Basel
	Wenger 16' (1:0); Hauser 23' (2:0)	Summary		Attendance: 12,000; Referee: (Switzerland) Ulysse Darbellay Roche

6 September 1969 Round 3	Lausanne-Sport	1–1	Basel	Olympique de la Pontaise, Lausanne
20:30	Dürr 73 pen. 1:1'; Vuilleumier (yellow card)	Summary	47' (0:1) Wenger	Attendance: 18,000; Referee: (Switzerland) A. Ceretti Biel/Bienne

20 September 1969 Round 4	Basel	3–2	La Chaux-de-Fonds	St. Jakob Stadium Landhof, Basel
	Hauser 26' (1:0); Rahmen 48' (2:0); Wenger 53' (3:0)	Summary	59' (3:1) Richard; (yellow card) 81' Mérillat; (yellow card) 83' Vincent; 90' (3:2) Zürcher	Attendance: 10,000; Referee: (Switzerland) Othmar Huber Thun

28 September 1969 Round 5	Young Boys	2–1	Basel	Wankdorf Stadium, Bern
	Bruttin 22' (1:0); Allemann 90' (pen. 2:1)	Summary	29' (1:1) Benthaus	Attendance: 23,000; Referee: (Switzerland) Hans Wieland Grenchen

4 October 1969 Round 6	Basel	1–1	Zürich	St. Jakob Stadium, Basel
	Odermatt 72' (pen. 1:0)	Summary	89' (1:1) Grünig	Attendance: 26,500; Referee: (Switzerland)

18 October 1969 Round 7	Winterthur	2–0	Basel	Schützenwiese, Winterthur
	Konietzka 29' (1:0); Dimmeler 76' (2:0)	Summary		Attendance: 9,000; Referee: (Switzerland) Roland Marendaz Lausanne

26 October 1969 Round 8	Lugano	2–1	Basel	Cornaredo, Lugano
	Luttrop 73' (1:1); Luttrop 78' (2:1)	Summary	71' (0:1) Hauser	Attendance: 12,000; Referee: (Switzerland) Anton Bucheli Luzern

9 November 1969 Round 9	Basel	2–2	Servette	St. Jakob Stadium Landhof, Basel
	Benthaus 14' (1:0); Hauser 22' (2:0)	Summary	36' (2:1) Bosson; 63' (2:2) Heutschi; (yellow card) 84' Guyot	Attendance: 12,000; Referee: (Switzerland) Gilbert Droz Marin

16 November 1969 Round 10	Fribourg	0–0	Basel	Stade Universitaire Saint-Léonard, Fribourg
		Summary		Attendance: 14,000 (new record); Referee: (Switzerland) A. Ceretti Biel/Bienne

30 November 1969 Round 11	Basel	5–1	Biel-Bienne	St. Jakob Stadium Landhof, Basel
	Hauser 11' (1:0); Balmer 15' (2:0); Sundermann 33' (pen. 3:1); Sundermann 41' (pen. 4:1); Demarmels 86' (5:1)	Summary	25' (2:1) Renfer (I)	Attendance: 8,000; Referee: (Switzerland) Walter Hungerbühler St. Gallen

7 December 1969 Round 12	Grasshopper Club	2–0	Basel	Hardturm, Zürich
	Citherlet 2' (1:0); Grahn 50' (2:0)	Summary		Attendance: 6,000; Referee: (Switzerland) Gilbert Droz Marin

14 December 1969 Round 13	Basel	6–2	Wettingen	St. Jakob Stadium Landhof, Basel
	Balmer 12' (1:0); Ramseier 44' (2:0); Sundermann 48' (3:0); Sundermann 54' (4:0); Rüefli 70' (5:0); Hauser 83' (6:1)	Summary	71' (5:1) Beichter; 82' (6:2)	Attendance: 8,000; Referee: (Switzerland) Roland Keller Bern

1 March 1970 Round 14	Basel	2–1	St. Gallen	St. Jakob Stadium, Basel
	Benthaus 32' (1:1); Sundermann 38' (pen. 2:1)	Summary	30' (0:1) Nafziger	Attendance: 8,000; Referee: (Switzerland) Othmar Huber Thun

8 March 1970 Round 15	Bellinzona	PP	Basel	Stadio Comunale, Bellinzona

15 March 1970 Round 16	Basel	1–1	Lausanne-Sport	St. Jakob Stadium, Basel
	Balmer 19' (1:0)	Summary	(yellow card) 16' Chapuisat; 46' (1:1) Zappella; (yellow card) 83' Loichat	Attendance: 17,000; Referee: (Switzerland) Gilbert Droz Marin

Round 17	La Chaux-de-Fonds	PP	Basel	Stade Charrière, La Chaux-de-Fonds
		[ Summary]

4 April 1970 Round 18	Basel	3–1	Young Boys	St. Jakob Stadium, Basel
	Odermatt (penalty missed) 33′ Michaud 58' (1:1); Balmer 65' (2:1); Balmer 77' (3:1); Sundermann (yellow card)	Summary	52' (0:1) Müller; (yellow card) Müller	Attendance: 9,500; Referee: (Switzerland) Walter Gallmann Oberrieden

12 April 1970 Round 19	Zürich	0–1	Basel	Letzigrund, Zürich
	Münch (yellow card) 70'	Summary	13' (0:1) Sundermann	Attendance: 22,000; Referee: (Switzerland) Walter Hungerbühler St. Gallen

15 April 1970 Round 15	Bellinzona	0–4	Basel	Stadio Comunale, Bellinzona
		Summary	11' (0:1) Benthaus; 33' (0:2) Hauser; 47' (0:3) Wenger; 57' (0:4) Wenger	Attendance: 8,000; Referee: (Switzerland) Fernand Burioli Lausanne

18 April 1970 Round 20	Basel	4–0	Winterthur	St. Jakob Stadium, Basel
	Wenger 17' (1:0); Balmer 64' (2:0); Wenger 70' (3:0); Balmer 73' (4:0)	Summary		Attendance: 17,500; Referee: (Switzerland) Ulysse Darbellay Roche

25 April 1970 Round 21	Basel	4–0	Lugano	St. Jakob Stadium, Basel
	Wenger 11' (1:0); Odermatt 14' (2:0); Wenger 58' (3:0); Sundermann 61' (4:0)	Summary		Attendance: 25,000; Referee: (Switzerland) Marcel Schneuwly Fribourg

6 May 1970 Round 17	La Chaux-de-Fonds	0–0	Basel	Stade Charrière, La Chaux-de-Fonds
18:00		Summary		Attendance: 6,000; Referee: (Switzerland) Claudio Laich Massagno

9 May 1970 Round 22	Servette	1–2	Basel	Charmilles Stadium, Geneva
	Pottier 70' (1:1)	Summary	9' (0:1) Hauser; 86' (1:2) Hauser	Attendance: 11,500; Referee: (Switzerland) Othmar Huber Thun

13 May 1970 Round 23	Basel	3–0	Fribourg	St. Jakob Stadium, Basel
	Hauser 40' (1:0); Sundermann 45' (pen. 2:0); Hauser 70' (3:0)	Summary		Attendance: 15,000; Referee: (Switzerland) Rolan Bernd Keller

23 May 1970 Round 24	Biel-Bienne	1–4	Basel	Gurzelen Stadion, Biel/Bienne
	Amez-Droz 19' (1:0); Renfer (II) (yellow card) 20'	Summary	24' (1:1) Balmer; 31' (1:2) Balmer; 42' (1:3) Balmer; 50' (1:1) Odermatt; (red card) 60' Hauser	Attendance: 13,000; Referee: (Switzerland) Marcel Despland Yverdon

27 May 1970 Round 25	Basel	0–0	Grasshopper Club	St. Jakob Stadium Landhof, Basel
	Odermatt (yellow card) 90'	Summary	(yellow card) 34' Mocellin; (yellow card) 90+1' Rüegg	Attendance: 35,000; Referee: (Switzerland) Mario Clematide Zollikofen

30 May 1970 Round 26	Wettingen	0–5	Basel	Stadion Altenburg, Wettingen
	Wernle (yellow card) 40'	[ Summary]	4' (0:1) Hauser; 7' (0:2) Hauser; 17' (0:3) Balmer; 30' (0:4) Ramseier; 67' (0:5) Benthaus	Attendance: 10,000; Referee: (Switzerland) Marcel Schneuwly Fribourg

==== League standings ====
Pos	Team	Pld	W	D	L	GF	GA	GD	Pts	Qualification
1	Basel (C)	26	15	7	4	59	23	+36	37	Swiss Champions, qualified for 1970–71 European Cup
2	Lausanne-Sport	26	12	12	2	54	36	+18	36	Entered 1970 Intertoto Cup
3	Zürich	26	15	4	7	49	29	+20	34	Swiss Cup winners, qualified for 1970–71 Cup Winners' Cup
4	Grasshopper Club	26	12	7	7	39	24	+15	31	Entered 1970 Intertoto Cup
5	Young Boys	26	13	5	8	52	41	+11	31	
6	Lugano	26	10	10	6	43	37	+6	30	
7	Servette	26	10	9	7	53	37	+16	29	Entered 1970 Intertoto Cup
8	Winterthur	26	11	5	10	50	41	+9	27	Entered 1970 Intertoto Cup
9	La Chaux-de-Fonds	26	9	3	14	36	55	−19	21	
10	Bellinzona	26	6	8	12	26	43	−17	20	
11	Fribourg	26	7	5	14	27	37	−10	19	
12	Biel-Bienne	26	7	5	14	28	55	−27	19	
13	Wettingen	26	6	3	17	33	62	−29	15	Relegated to Nationalliga B
14	St. Gallen	26	6	3	17	28	57	−29	15	Relegated to Nationalliga B

Source: rsssf.com
(C) Champions

=== Swiss Cup ===
Round of 32

14 September 1969 Round of 32	Basel	10 – 0	Minerva	St. Jakob Stadium, Basel
	Hauser 17' (1:0); Hauser 35' (2:0); Wenger 41' (3:0); Ramseier 42' (4:0); Hauser 52' (5:0); Ramseier 59' (6:0); Hauser 68' (7:0); Balmer 69' (8:0); Michaud 77' (9:0); Balmer 85' (10:0)	Summary		Attendance: 5,000; Referee: (Switzerland) Walter Gallmann Oberrieden

Round of 16

12 October 1969 Round of 16	Basel	3–2	Grenchen	Basel
	Wenger 36' (1:2); Michaud 60' (2:2); Demarmels 83' (3:2)	Summary	3' (0:1) Lander; 21' (0:2) Obrecht (II)	Stadium: St. Jakob Stadium; Attendance: 6,700; Referee: (Switzerland) Marcel Despland Yverdon

Quarter-final

19 November 1969 First leg	Xamax	0–2	Basel	Neuchâtel
20:15	Stutz (yellow card)	Summary	38' (0:1) Hauser; 61' (pen. 0:2) Sundermann	Stadium: Stade de la Maladière; Attendance: 4,200; Referee: (Switzerland) Mario Clematide Zollikofen

23 November 1969 Second leg	Basel	5–2 (7 – 2 agg.)	Xamax	St. Jakob Stadium, Basel
	Sundermann 23' (1:0); Hauser 42' (2:0); Balmer 44' (3:0); Odermatt 67' (4:1); Ramseier 84' (5:2)	Summary	61' (3:1) Manzoni; 74' (4:2) Schmid	Attendance: 8,00; Referee: (Switzerland) Othmar Huber Thun

Basel won 7 – 2 on aggregate.

Semi-final

30 March 1970 First leg	Servette	0–2	Basel	Charmilles Stadium, Geneva
		Summary	39' (0:1) Wenger; 50' (0:2) Odermatt	Attendance: 14,000; Referee: (Switzerland) Anton Bucheli Luzern

8 April 1970 Second leg	Basel	4–1 (6 – 1 agg.)	Servette	St. Jakob Stadium, Basel
	Hauser 16' (1:0); Wenger 36' (2:0); Wenger 76' (3:1); Ramseier 85' (4:1)	Summary	63' (2:1) Nemeth	Attendance: 16,000; Referee: (Switzerland) Pius Kamber Zürich

Basel won 6 – 1 on aggregate.

Final

18 May 1970 Final	Zürich	4–1 (a.e.t.)	Basel	Wankdorf, Bern
	Quentin 74' (1:1); Künzli 92' (2:1); Künzli 101' (3:1); Corti 113' (4:1)		62' (0:1) Odermatt	Attendance: 47,500; Referee: (Switzerland) Roland Marendaz Lausanne

Zürich won 4–1 after extra time.

=== European Cup ===
First round

17 September 1969 First leg	Basel (Switzerland)	0 – 0	(Scotland) Celtic	St. Jakob Stadium, Basel
		Report		Attendance: 37,587; Referee: Rudolf Glöckner (East Germany)

1 October 1969 Second leg	Celtic (Scotland)	2 – 0 (2 – 0 agg.)	(Switzerland) Basel	Celtic Park, Glasgow
	Hood 1'; Gemmell 70'	Report		Attendance: 49,976; Referee: Gyula Emsberger (Hungary)

Celtic won 2–0 on aggregate.

=== Coppa delle Alpi ===
==== Group B matches ====
14 June 1969 Round 1	FC Basel (Switzerland)	4–1	(Italy) Sampdoria	St. Jakob Stadium Basel
20:00	Hauser 5' (1:0); Benthaus 36' (2:0); Sundermann 43' (3:0); Odermatt 74' (4:0)	Summary	80' (4:1) Frustaluppi	Attendance: 6.500; Referee: (West Germany) Fritz Seiler

17 June 1969 Round 2	FC Basel (Switzerland)	3–0	(Belgium) K.S.V. Waregem	St. Jakob Stadium Basel
20:00	Sundermann 38' (1:0); Hauser 42' (3:0); Sundermann 73' (pen. 3:0)	Summary		Attendance: 4,500; Referee: (West Germany) Max Spinnler

21 June 1969 Round 3	FC Basel (Switzerland)	3–2	(Germany) Eintracht Frankfurt	St. Jakob Stadium Basel
20:00	Hauser 6' (1:0); Benthaus 30' (2:1); Balmer 64' (3:2)	Summary	19' (1:1) Hölzenbein; 35' (2:2) Hölzenbein	Attendance: 9,500; Referee: (Italy) Renzo Torelli

24 June 1969 Round 4	FC Basel (Switzerland)	2–3	(Italy) Napoli	St. Jakob Stadium Basel
20:00	Odermatt 36' (1:1); Wenger 65' (2:1)	Summary	4' (0:1) Barison; (yellow card) 26' Montefusco; 84' (2:2) Montefusco; 89' (2:3) Salvi	Attendance: 10,500; Referee: (Germany) Rudolf Kreitlein

NB: teams did not play compatriots; Waregem did not play Eintracht

==== Group B table ====
Pos	Team	Pld	W	D	L	GF	GA	GD	Pts
1	FC Basel	4	3	0	1	12	6	+6	6
2	Napoli	4	2	1	1	8	6	+2	5
3	K.S.V. Waregem	4	1	2	1	9	8	+1	4
4	Eintracht Frankfurt	4	2	0	2	7	9	−2	4
5	Sampdoria	4	1	1	2	7	10	−3	3
6	Biel-Bienne	4	0	2	2	4	8	−4	2

Source: https://www.rsssf.org/tablesa/alpi69.html

==== Final ====
The Final was played in St. Jakob Stadium, Basel, between the winners of both groups.

27 June 1969 Final	FC Basel (Switzerland)	3–1	(Italy) Bologna	St. Jakob Stadium Basel
20:00	Hauser 16'; Kiefer 22'; Sundermann 28'	Summary	50' Ciacci	Attendance: 21,000; Referee: (West Germany) Kurt Tschenscher

== See also ==
- History of FC Basel
- List of FC Basel players
- List of FC Basel seasons

== Sources ==
- Rotblau: Jahrbuch Saison 2017/2018. Publisher: FC Basel Marketing AG. ISBN 978-3-7245-2189-1
- Die ersten 125 Jahre. Publisher: Josef Zindel im Friedrich Reinhardt Verlag, Basel. ISBN 978-3-7245-2305-5
- Verein "Basler Fussballarchiv" Homepage
- Switzerland 1969–70 at RSSSF
- Cup of the Alps 1969 at RSSSF
