= 1968–69 FC Basel season =

FC Basel
1968–69 season
- Chairman: Harry Thommen
- Manager: Helmut Benthaus
- Ground: St. Jakob Stadium, Basel
- Nationalliga A: Champions
- Swiss Cup: Quarter-finals
- Fairs Cup: Round 1
- Cup of the Alps: Runners-up
- Top goalscorer: League: Helmut Hauser (10); All: Helmut Hauser (25)
- Highest home attendance: 46,000 on 31 May 1969 vs. Lausanne-Sport
- Lowest home attendance: 6,000 on 12 April 1969 vs. Servette
- Average home league attendance: 15,476

The 1968–69 season was Fussball Club Basel 1893's 75th season in their existence. It was their 23rd consecutive season in the top flight of Swiss football after their promotion the season 1945–46. Harry Thommen was the club's chairman of the board for the third consecutive season. Basel played their home games in the St. Jakob Stadium.

== Overview ==
=== Pre-season ===
During this season Helmut Benthaus was the club's player-manager for the fourth consecutive season. Paul Fischli joined the team coming from Young Fellows Zürich. Jürgen Sundermann signed in from Servette and Walter Balmer joined from Thun. In the other direction Hanspeter Stocker left the club after eight years and moved to Baden for his last season before retiring from his active football career. Between the years 1960 and 1968 Stocker played a total of 309 games for Basel scoring a total of 34 goals. 171 of these games were in the Nationalliga A, 28 in the Swiss Cup, 28 were on European level and 82 were friendly games. He scored 22 goal in the domestic league, 3 in the Cup, 2 in the European matches and the other seven were scored during the test games. Markus Pfirter left the club after seven years and went on to St. Gallen. Between the years 1961 and 1968 Pfirter played a total of 263 games for Basel scoring a total of 54 goals. 143 of these games were in the Nationalliga A, 27 in the Swiss Cup, 28 in European competitions and 65 were friendly games. He scored 29 goal in the domestic league, 10 in the Cup and one in the International Football Cup. The other 14 were scored during the test games. Also, Roberto Frigerio left the club after a total of seven years. He moved to Bellinzona. Between the years 1958 to 1960 and again from 1963 to 1968, Frigerio played a total of 256 games for Basel scoring a total of 176 goals. 144 of these games were in the Nationalliga A, 23 in the Swiss Cup, 18 in the european competitions (Cup of the Alps, Inter-Cities Fairs Cup, European Cup) and 71 were friendly games. He scored 74 goals in the domestic league, 22 in the Swiss Cup, 7 in the european competitions and the other 73 were scored during the test games. Moscatelli left after five years and went to Lugano. Between the years 1964 and 1967 Moscatelli played a total of 95 games for Basel scoring a total of 27 goals. 47 of these games were in the Nationalliga A, 12 in the Swiss Cup, 11 were on European level (Cup of the Alps, Inter-Cities Fairs Cup) and 25 were friendly games. He scored 8 goals in the domestic league, three in the Swiss Cup, one in the Cup of the Alps and the other 15 were scored during the test games.

Basel played a total of 52 matches in this season. 26 of these games were in the domestic league, three were in the Swiss Cup, five were in the Cup of the Alps, two were in the Inter-Cities Fairs Cup and 15 were friendly matches. Of these 15 test games 12 were won and two ended with a draw and one ended in a defeat. Seven were played at home and eight played away.

=== Domestic league ===
There were 14 teams contesting in the 1968–69 Nationalliga A. These were the top 12 teams from the previous 1967–68 season and the two newly promoted teams Winterthur and St. Gallen. Basel finished the league season as champions one point ahead of Lausanne Sports in second position, who they defeated 4–0 in the second last match of the season, and six points clear of FC Zürich who finished third. Basel won 13 of the 26 games, drawing ten, losing three times, they scored 48 goals conceding 28. Helmut Hauser was the team's top goal scorer with 16 league goals. Karl Odermatt, Jürgen Sundermann and Walter Balmer each scored 5 league goals. Both Sundermann and Ramseier played in all 26 league matches that season.

=== Swiss Cup ===
In the Swiss Cup Basel started in the round of 32 with a 2–1 away win against Thun and in the round of 16, with a home match, they beat Luzern 3–1. In the Quarter-final Basel played an away game against Servette but lost this 1–0.

=== Inter-Cities Fairs Cup and Cup of the Alps ===
In the Inter-Cities Fairs Cup Basel were drawn against Bologna the first leg away from home on 18 September the return leg in Basel on 2 October. Bologna won both games. In the 1968 Cup of the Alps the team managed to win the group and played in the final against FC Schalke 04 but were defeated 1–3 after extra time.

== Players ==
Note: Flags indicate national team as defined under FIFA eligibility rules; some limited exceptions apply. Players may hold more than one non-FIFA nationality.

No.	Pos.	Nation	Player
—	GK	SUI	Claude Iff (new (ES FC Malley) games: 1)
—	GK	SUI	Marcel Kunz (games: 18)
—	GK	FRA	Jean-Paul Laufenburger (games: 10)
—	DF	SUI	Paul Fischli (new (Young Fellows Zürich) games: 15)
—	DF	GER	Josef Kiefer (games: 23)
—	DF	SUI	Bruno Michaud (games/goals: 25/2)
—	DF	SUI	Walter Mundschin (games: 5)
—	DF	SUI	Roland Paolucci (games/goals: 22/1)
—	DF	SUI	Peter Ramseier (games: 26)
—	DF	SUI	Manfred Schädler (games: 1)
—	MF	GER	Helmut Benthaus (games/goals: 12/1)

No.	Pos.	Nation	Player
—	MF	SUI	Otto Demarmels (games/goals: 8/2)
—	FW	HUN	Janos Konrad (games/goals: 6/2)
—	MF	SUI	Karl Odermatt (games/goals: 24/5)
—	MF	SUI	Anton Schnyder (games: 1)
—	MF	SUI	Urs Siegenthaler (games: 9)
—	MF	GER	Jürgen Sundermann (new (Servette) games/goals: 26/5)
—	FW	SUI	Walter Balmer (new (Thun) games/goals: 11/5)
—	FW	GER	Helmut Hauser (games/goals: 19/10)
—	MF	SUI	Bruno Rahmen (games/goals: 7/1)
—	FW	SUI	Dieter Rüefli (games/goals: 12/3)
—	FW	SUI	Peter Wenger (games/goals: 20/4)

Players who left the squad

Note: Flags indicate national team as defined under FIFA eligibility rules; some limited exceptions apply. Players may hold more than one non-FIFA nationality.

No.	Pos.	Nation	Player
—	GK	SUI	Hans-Ruedi Günthardt (to Old Boys)
—	GK	SUI	Herbert Stierli (new)

No.	Pos.	Nation	Player
—	MF	SUI	Werner Decker (reserve team)
—	MF	SUI	Aldo Moscatelli (to Lugano)
—	FW	SUI	Hanspeter Vetter

== Results ==
Legend

Win Draw Loss Postponed

=== Friendly matches ===
==== Pre- and mid-season ====
28 July 1968 Pre-season	VfB Stuttgart (West Germany)	4–4	(Switzerland) Basel	Panoramastadion (Holzhausen)
16:00	Sieloff 20' (pen. 1:1); Haug 27' (2:1); Haaga 32' (3:1); Handschuh 65' (4:1)	Summary	5' (0:1) Fischli; 85' (4:2) Odermatt; 87' (4:3) Rüefli; 90' (4:4) Odermatt	Attendance: 6,000

31 July 1968 Pre-season	Baden (Switzerland)	2–4	(Switzerland) Basel	Scharten, Baden
	Keller 85' (1:4); Wolfensberger 89' (2:4)	Summary	2' (0:1) Wenger; 47' (0:2) Konrad; 75' (0:3) Wenger; 80' (0:4) Rüefli	Attendance: 2,000; Referee: (Switzerland) Pius Kamber Zürich

3 August 1968 Pre-season	Freiburger FC (West Germany)	3–1	(Switzerland) Basel	Freiburg
	(1:1) (2:1) (3:1)	Summary	13' (0:1) Fischli

6 August 1968 Pre-season	Basel (Switzerland)	4–3	(West Germany) Karlsruher SC	St. Jakob Stadium, Basel
20:15	Sundermann 12' (1:0); Hauser 55' (pen. 2:3); Rüefli 57' (3:3); Fischli 82' (4:3)	Summary	16' (1:1) Böttcher; 34' (1:2) Blechinger; 48' (1:3) Böttcher	Attendance: 5,500; Referee: (Switzerland) Pius Kamber Zürich

11 August 1968 Pre-season	SC Zofingen (Switzerland)	0–12	(Switzerland) Basel	Längacker, Aarburg
		Summary	Fischli; Rüefli; Demarmels; Odermatt; Hauser; Wenger	Attendance: 1,200; Referee: (Switzerland) Marcel Zürcher Wettingen

10 September 1969 Mid-season	Basel (Switzerland)	0–0	(West Germany) 1. FC Nürnberg	St. Jakob Stadium, Basel
20:15		Summary		Attendance: 13,000; Referee: (Switzerland) Josef Zibung Luzern

25 September 1968 Mid-season	FC Olten (Switzerland)	0–6	(Switzerland) Basel	Kleinholz, Olten
		Summary	12' (0:1) Sundermann; 37' (0:2) Hauser; 39' (0:3) Rüefli; 38' (0:4) Hauser; 80' (0:5) Fischli; 85' (0:6) Ramseier	Attendance: 1,000; Referee: (Switzerland) Rudolf Rettig Gerlafingen

27 November 1968 Mid-season	Basel (Switzerland)	5–1	(Switzerland) Polizei-Nationalmannschaft	Leichtathletikstadion St. Jakob Münchenstein
	Demarmels; Rüefli; Odermatt	Summary	(o.g.)	Attendance: 50; Referee: (Switzerland) J. Heymann Arlesheim

==== Winter break ====
8 February 1969 Winter break	Basel (Switzerland)	3–2	(Switzerland) Schaffhausen	Landhof, Basel
14:30	Hauser 2' (1:0); Wenger 20' (2:0); Hauser (penalty missed) 38′ Michaud 58' (3:0)	Summary	72' (3:1) Meier; 83' (3:2) Meier	Attendance: 400; Referee: (Switzerland) Peter Hänggi Aesch

9 February 1969 Winter break	Wettingen (Switzerland)	0–3	(Switzerland) Basel	Stadion Altenburg, Wettingen
		Summary	Odermatt 28' (0:1); Paolucci 48' (0:2); Rüefli 88' (0:3)	Attendance: 1,000; Referee: (Switzerland) Schneider Zürich

12 February 1969 Winter break	FC Pratteln (Switzerland)	0–6	(Switzerland) Basel	In den Sandgruben, Pratteln
		Summary	15' (0:1) Hauser; 43' (0:2) Rüefli; 45' (0:3) Demarmels; 54' (0:4) Hauser; 64' (0:5) Hauser; 68' (0:6) Rüefli	Attendance: 300; Referee: (Switzerland) Kurt Fuchs Basel

16 February 1969 Winter break	Basel (Switzerland)	2–1	(Switzerland) Grasshopper Club	Landhof, Basel
14:30	Sundermann 13' (pen. 1:1); Odermatt 14' (2:1)	Summary	2' (0:1) Vogel	Attendance: 1,200; Referee: (Switzerland) Josef Zibung Luzern

19 February 1969 Winter break	Black Stars Basel (Switzerland)	0–14	(Switzerland) Basel	Buschweilerhof Basel
		Summary	Hauser; Balmer; Rahmen; Wenger; Odermatt; Siegenthaler; Paolucci; Sundermann	Attendance: 300

2 April 1969 Mid-season	Basel (Switzerland)	4–1	(Switzerland) Aarau	St. Jakob Stadium, Basel
20:00	Michaud 45' (1:0); Hauser 59' (2:0); Walz 66' (o.g.); Sundermann 87' (4:1)	Summary	73' (3:1) Mauli	Attendance: 1,000; Referee: (Switzerland) H. R. Keller Basel

28 May 1969 Mid-season	Basel (Switzerland)	7–0	(Switzerland) Concordia Basel	Basel
	Balmer; Benthaus; Hauser; Odermatt; Rahmen; Ramseier	Summary

=== Nationalliga ===
==== League matches ====
17 August 1968 Round 1	Basel	4–2	Biel-Bienne	St. Jakob Stadium, Basel
20:15	Rüefli 18' (1:0); Leu 54' (o.g); Fischli 61' (3:0); Sundermann 81' (4:1)	Summary	80' (3:1) Treuthardt; 89' (4:2) Leu	Attendance: 9,000; Referee: (Switzerland) Marcel Despland Yverdon

25 August 1968 Round 2	Bellinzona	2–1	Basel	Stadio Comunale Bellinzona
16:00	Rebozzi (penalty missed) 13′ Sörensen 43' (1:1); Benko 68' (2:1)	Summary	20' (0:1) Fischli	Attendance: 6,000; Referee: (Switzerland) Othmar Huber Thun

31 August 1968 Round 3	Basel	1–1	Grasshopper Club	St. Jakob Stadium, Basel
20:00	Fischli (penalty missed) 49′ Wenger 64' (1:1)	Summary	8' (0:1) Rüegg; (yellow card) Ingold; (yellow card) Staudenmann	Attendance: 14,000; Referee: (Switzerland) Rudolf Scheurer Bettlach

7 September 1968 Round 4	Sion	1–1	Basel	Stade Tourbillon, Sion
20:30	Bruttin 45' (1:1)	Summary	(yellow card) 55' Wenger; 82' (1:1) Konrad	Attendance: 5,000; Referee: (Switzerland) Luigi Grassi Novazzano

14 September 1968 Round 5	Basel	3–2	St. Gallen	St. Jakob Stadium, Basel
20:15	Rüefli 3' (1:0); Rüefli 9' (pen. 2:0); Sundermann 49' (3:1)	Summary	34' (2:1) Frei; 78' (3:2) Frei	Attendance: 8,000; Referee: (Switzerland) Mario Clematide Zollikofen

29 September 1968 Round 6	Servette	0–2	Basel	Charmilles Stadium, Geneva
15:00		Summary	20' (1:0) Konrad; 28' (2:0) Odermatt	Attendance: 6,000; Referee: (Switzerland) Pius Kamber Zürich

5 October 1968 Round 7	Basel	2–1	Young Boys	St. Jakob Stadium, Basel
20:15	Hauser 64' (1:1); Fischli 68' (2:1)	Summary	26' (0:1) Guggisberg	Attendance: 15,500; Referee: (Switzerland) Fernand Burioli Lausanne

19 October 1968 Round 8	Lugano	1–0	Basel	Cornaredo, Lugano
20:30	Simonetti 12' (1:0)	Summary		Attendance: 7,000; Referee: (Switzerland) Marcel Schneuwly Fribourg

26 October 1968 Round 9	Basel	2–1	Zürich	St. Jakob Stadium, Basel
17:30	Fischli 72' (1:0); Fischli 75' (2:0)	Summary	83' (2:1) Martinelli	Attendance: 20,000; Referee: (Switzerland) A. Ceretti Biel/Bienne

10 November 1968 Round 10	La Chaux-de-Fonds	1–1	Basel	Stade Charrière, La Chaux-de-Fonds
14:45	Brossard 46' (1:1)	Summary	29' (0:1) Rahmen	Attendance: 6,000; Referee: (Switzerland) Roland Racine Prilly

17 November 1968 Round 11	Basel	1–1	Winterthur	St. Jakob Stadium, Basel
14:30	Paolucci 83' (1:1)	Summary	38' (0:1) Konietzka	Attendance: 8,000; Referee: (Switzerland) Werner Mettler St. Gallen

1 December 1968 Round 12	Lausanne-Sport	5–0	Basel	Olympique de la Pontaise, Lausanne
14:30	Vuillemier 32' (1:0); Hosp 47' (2:0); Chapuisat 50' (3:0); Zappella 68' (4:0); Kerkhoffs 71' (5:0)	Summary		Attendance: 10,000; Referee: (Switzerland) Othmar Huber Thun

8 December 1968 Round 13	Basel	2–1	Luzern	St. Jakob Stadium, Basel
14:30	Hauser 39' (1:0); Fischli 68' (2:1)	Summary	52' (1:1) Meyer	Attendance: 7,200; Referee: (Switzerland) Pius Kamber Zürich

2 March 1969 Round 14	Biel-Bienne	1–1	Basel	Gurzelen Stadion, Biel/Bienne
15:00	Peters 75' (1:0); Knuchel (penalty missed) 80′	Summary	85' (pen. 1:1) Sundermann	Attendance: 7,000; Referee: (Switzerland) Marcel Schneuwly Fribourg

9 March 1969 Round 15	Basel	1–1	Bellinzona	St. Jakob Stadium, Basel
14:30	Hauser 61' (1:0)	Summary	81' (1:1) Paglia	Attendance: 11,000; Referee: (Switzerland) Anton Bucheli Luzern

16 March 1969 Round 16	Grasshopper Club	2–2	Basel	Letzigrund, Zürich
15:00	Blättler 38' (1:0); Thurnherr 44' (2:1)	Summary	40' (1:1) Wenger; 51' (2:2) Demarmels	Attendance: 5,000; Referee: (Switzerland) Mario Clematide Zollikofen

22 March 1969 Round 17	Basel	2–2	Sion	St. Jakob Stadium, Basel
15:00	Demarmels 88' (1:2); Michaud 90' (2:2)	Summary	26' (0:1) Elsig; 68' (0:2) Herrmann	Attendance: 8,500; Referee: (Switzerland) Othmar Huber Thun

30 March 1969 Round 18	St. Gallen	0–0	Basel	Paul-Grüninger-Stadion, St. Gallen
14:30		Summary		Attendance: 5,500; Referee: (Switzerland) A. Ceretti Biel/Bienne

12 April 1969 Round 19	Basel	2–1	Servette	St. Jakob Stadium, Basel
20:00	Hauser 15' (1:0); Balmer 39' (2:0); Hauser (yellow card) 88'	Summary	(yellow card) 31' Martin; (yellow card) 36' Schindelholz; 80' (o.g. 1:2) Michaud	Attendance: 6,000; Referee: (Switzerland) Hans Wieland Grenchen

19 April 1969 Round 20	Young Boys	0–2	Basel	Wankdorf Stadium, Bern
20:15		Summary	24' (0:1) Hauser; 28' (0:2) Balmer	Attendance: 24,000; Referee: (Switzerland) Rudolf Scheurer Bettlach

26 April 1969 Round 21	Basel	3–0	Lugano	St. Jakob Stadium, Basel
20:00	Wenger 16' (1:0); Hauser 32' (2:0); Hauser 77' (3:0)	Summary		Attendance: 32,000; Referee: (Switzerland) Gilbert Droz Marin

4 May 1969 Round 22	Zürich	0–3	Basel	Letzigrund, Zürich
15:45	Künzli (penalty missed) 90′	Summary	7' (pen. 0:1) Sundermann; 45' (0:2) Balmer; 75' (0:3) Odermatt	Attendance: 16,000; Referee: (Switzerland) Josef Zibung Luzern

9 May 1969 Round 23	Basel	5–0	La Chaux-de-Fonds	St. Jakob Stadium, Basel
20:00	Hauser 5' (1:0); Hauser 40' (2:0); Odermatt 48' (3:0); Wenger 71' (4:0); Balmer 85' (5:0)	Summary		Attendance: 16,000; Referee: (Switzerland) Marcel Despland Yverdon

17 May 1969 Round 24	Winterthur	0–0	Basel	Schützenwiese, Winterthur
17:15		Summary	(yellow card) 43' Wenger	Attendance: 12,000; Referee: (Switzerland) Anton Bucheli Luzern

31 May 1969 Round 25	Basel	4–0	Lausanne-Sport	St. Jakob Stadium, Basel
20:00	Balmer 37' (1:0); Odermatt 43' (2:0); Benthaus 50' (3:0); Hauser 84' (4:0)	Summary		Attendance: 46,000 (new record for Swiss football); Referee: (Switzerland) Rudolf Scheurer Bettlach

7 June 1969 Round 26	Luzern	2–3	Basel	Stadion Allmend, Luzern
20:15	Trivellin 15' (pen. 1:0); Richter 52' (2:2)	Summary	(yellow card) 31' Benthaus; 36' (pen. 1:1) Sundermann; 47' (1:2) Michaud; 57' (2:3) Odermatt	Attendance: 16,500; Referee: (Switzerland) Hans Wieland Grenchen

==== League standings ====
Pos	Team	Pld	W	D	L	GF	GA	GD	Pts	Qualification
1	Basel (C)	26	13	10	3	48	28	+20	36	Swiss Champions, qualified for 1969–70 European Cup
2	Lausanne-Sport	26	15	5	6	70	43	+27	35	
3	Zürich	26	12	6	8	61	37	+24	30	
4	Young Boys	26	12	6	8	49	36	+13	30	Entered 1969 Intertoto Cup
5	Lugano	26	11	7	8	37	26	+11	29	Entered 1969 Intertoto Cup
6	Bellinzona	26	10	8	8	38	41	−3	28	Entered 1969 Intertoto Cup
7	FC Biel-Bienne	26	9	8	9	52	59	−7	26	
8	Servette	26	9	7	10	32	39	−7	25	Entered 1969 Intertoto Cup
9	Grasshopper Club	26	7	9	10	43	47	−4	23	
10	St. Gallen	26	6	11	9	29	37	−8	23	Swiss Cup winners, qualified for 1969–70 Cup Winners' Cup
11	Winterthur	26	5	12	9	28	43	−15	22	
12	La Chaux-de-Fonds	26	5	11	10	51	53	−2	21	Entered 1969 Intertoto Cup
13	Sion	26	7	6	13	39	52	−13	20	Relegated to Nationalliga B
14	Luzern	26	6	4	16	35	71	−36	16	Relegated to Nationalliga B

Source: rsssf.com
(C) Champions

=== Swiss Cup ===
2 November 1968 Round of 32	Thun	1–2	Basel	Stadion Lachen, Thun
	Balmer 43' (1:1)	Summary	17' (0:1) Fischli; 63' (1:2) Odermatt	Attendance: 4,500; Referee: (Switzerland) Anton Bucheli Luzern

15 December 1968 Round of 16	Basel	3–2	Zürich	St. Jakob Stadium, Basel
14:30	Ramseier 19' (1:0); Benthaus 75' (2:1); Hauser 90' (pen. 3:1)	Summary	74' (1:1) Gwerder; (red card) ?' Flury	Attendance: 9.200; Referee: (Switzerland) Fernand Burioli Lausanne

22 February 1969 Quarter-final	Servette	1–0	Basel	Charmilles Stadium, Geneva
14:30	Pottier 89' (1:0)	Summary	(yellow card) 53' Wenger	Attendance: 7,000; Referee: (Switzerland) Rudolf Scheurer Bettlach

=== Inter-Cities Fairs Cup ===
First round

18 September 1968 First leg	Bologna (Italy)	4–1	(Switzerland) FC Basel	Stadio Comunale (Littoriale) Bologna
	Turra 12'; Cresci 50'; Pace 53'; Savoldi 83'	Summary	Konrad 48'	Attendance: 11,000; Referee: (Portugal) Décio Vito Bentes de Freitas

2 October 1968 Second leg	FC Basel (Switzerland)	1–2	(Italy) Bologna	St. Jakob Stadium Basel
20:15	Hauser 42'	Summary	Pace 46'; Savoldi 63'	Attendance: 10,000; Referee: (France) Roger Barde

Bologna won 6–2 on aggregate.

=== Cup of the Alps ===
==== Group A matches ====
15 June 1968 round 1	Servette FC Genève (Switzerland)	1–1	(Switzerland) FC Basel	Wankdorf Stadium, Bern
	Henri 54' (1:0)	Summary	64' (1:1) Fischli	Attendance: 1,500; Referee: (Switzerland) Michael Huber

18 June 1968 round 2	FC Basel (Switzerland)	2–2	(Italy) A.S. Roma	St. Jakob Stadium Basel
20:00	Fischli 6'; Demarmels 18'	Summary	(yellow card) 39' Enzo; 49' Taccola; 85' Jair	Attendance: 7,100; Referee: (West Germany) Alfred Ott

22 June 1968 round 3	FC Basel (Switzerland)	1–0	(Germany) 1. FC Kaiserslautern	St. Jakob Stadium Basel
20:00	Paolucci 55' (1:0)	Summary		Attendance: 4,500; Referee: (Italy) Aurelio Angonese

25 June 1968 round 4	FC Basel (Switzerland)	3–2	(Germany) 1. FC Köln	St. Jakob Stadium Basel
20:00	Hauser 19' (1:0); Rahmen 66' (2:2); Hauser 81' (3:2)	Summary	30' (1:1) Jendroseck; 56' (1:2) Hemmersbach	Attendance: 8,500; Referee: (Italy) Antonio Sbardella

29 June 1969 round 5	FC Basel (Switzerland)	1–1	(Italy) Fiorentina	St. Jakob Stadium Basel
20:00	Paolucci 16' (1:0)	Summary	61' (1:1) Mariani	Attendance: 12,500; Referee: (West Germany) Hans-Joachim Weyland

==== Group A table ====
Pos	Team	Pld	W	D	L	GF	GA	GD	Pts
1	FC Basel	5	2	3	0	8	6	+2	7
2	A.S. Roma	5	3	1	1	8	7	+1	7
3	Fiorentina	5	2	2	1	8	5	+3	6
4	1. FC Kaiserslautern	5	2	1	2	6	4	+2	5
5	Servette FC Genève	5	1	2	2	6	9	−3	4
6	1. FC Köln	5	0	1	4	3	8	−5	1

Source: rsssf (see below)

==== Final ====
2. July 1968 Final	FC Basel (Switzerland)	1–3 (a.e.t.)	(Germany) FC Schalke 04	St. Jakob Stadium Basel
20:00	Helmut Hauser 40' (1:1); Schnyder (yellow card) 75'	Summary; Report FC Schalke 04	8' (0:1) Michel; 95' (1:2) Michel; 103' (1:3) Michel	Attendance: 13,000; Referee: (Italy) Mario Carminati

== See also ==
- History of FC Basel
- List of FC Basel players
- List of FC Basel seasons

== Sources ==
- Rotblau: Jahrbuch Saison 2015/2016. Publisher: FC Basel Marketing AG. ISBN 978-3-7245-2050-4
- Die ersten 125 Jahre. Publisher: Josef Zindel im Friedrich Reinhardt Verlag, Basel. ISBN 978-3-7245-2305-5
- Switzerland 1968–69 at RSSSF
- Cup of the Alps 1968 at RSSSF
