= 1971–72 FC Basel season =

FC Basel
1971–72 season
- Chairman: Félix Musfeld
- Manager: Helmut Benthaus
- Ground: St. Jakob Stadium, Basel
- Nationalliga A: Champions
- Swiss Cup: Runner-up
- UEFA Cup: Round 1
- Cup of the Alps: Runner-up
- Top goalscorer: League: Ottmar Hitzfeld (16); All: Hauser (27)
- Highest home attendance: 56,000 on 10 June 1972 vs. Zürich
- Lowest home attendance: 9,000 on 30 October 1971 vs. La Chaux-de-Fonds
- Average home league attendance: 18,769

The 1971–72 season was Fussball Club Basel 1893's 78th season in their existence. It was their 26th consecutive season in the top flight of Swiss football after their promotion the season 1945–46. They played their home games in the St. Jakob Stadium. The club's chairman was Félix Musfeld for the second year in a row.

== Overview ==
=== Pre-season ===
Helmut Benthaus was player-manager for the seventh consecutive season. Towards the end of his playing career Benthaus stood on the side line as team manager and he only substituted himself into the game if it was not running as he wanted it. In this season Benthaus substituted himself in during just one single game. This being the second last home match of the season on 27 May against Luzern Benthaus retired from playing in at the end of the season aged 36. He made only minor adjustments to his squad at the beginning of the season, Rolf Blättler joined from Lugano, René Hasler from Zürich and youngster Ottmar Hitzfeld was fetched from FV Lörrach on the lower German league. Edoardo Manzoni left the squad and returned to Xamax because his loan had come to an end.

=== Domestic league ===
14 teams contested in the 1971–72 Nationalliga A. These were the top 12 teams from the previous 1970–71 season and the two newly promoted teams St. Gallen and Grenchen. The championship was played in a double round robin. The champions would qualify for the 1972–73 European Cup and the last two teams in the table at the end of the season were to be relegated. Basel remained undefeated in the league during the first 24 rounds. Of their 26 league games Basel won 18, drawing seven, losing just once, scoring 66 goals conceding 28. Basel won the championship four points ahead of Zürich and five points ahead of the Grasshoppers. Ottmar Hitzfeld was Basel's top league goal scorer with 16 league goals, Walter Balmer second with 14 league goals and Karl Odermatt third best with 9 goals. The average attendance at the league matches was 18'769 spectators, the highest number of spectators came to the stadium for the last game of the season against Zürich

=== Swiss Cup ===
For Basel the Swiss Cup started in the round of 32 on 24 October 1971 with a 3–1 home win against Monthey. On 21 November in the round of 16 Basel played away from home against La Chaux-de-Fonds. The match resulted with a 3–0 success. The quarter-final was played on 12 March 1972 in Zürich against Grasshopper-Club. The tie ended with a 1–1 draw and this meant a replay three days later. Basel won the replay 3–2 and continued onto the semi-finals against BSC Young Boys. In the Wankdorf Stadium on 3 April Karl Odermatt and Walter Balmer each scored a goal to give Basel a 2–0 victory. The final was played on 22 May 1970 also in the Wankdorf Stadium but Basel were defeated 0–1 by Zürich through a goal by Jeandupeux in extra time of the first half.

=== UEFA and Cup of the Alps ===
The 1971–72 UEFA Cup was the inaugural year of the UEFA Cup (now known as the UEFA Europa League), which effectively replaced the Inter-Cities Fairs Cup. In the first round Basel were drawn against Real Madrid. The first leg, which played on 15 September 1971 in the St. Jakob Stadium attracted 32'059 spectators but ended for Basel with a 1–2 defeat. Madrid won thanks to goals from Francisco Aguilar and Santillana, who turned the result around after the Swiss scored the opener through René Hasler. The return leg on 29 September in Santiago Bernabéu Stadium was watched by 61'861 spectators and also ended with the same result. The same two Spanish international players were the heroes once again, each scoring a goal, to ensure Real Madrid their passage to the next round.

In the 1971 Cup of the Alps there were four participants from Switzerland and four from Italy. These being Hellas Verona, Lazio, Sampdoria and Varese. The four from Switzerland were Lugano, Lausanne Sports, Winterthur and Basel. Two teams from each country were drawn into each of the two groups. Within the group each team played the two clubs of the other country twice, but did not play compatriots. The Italians and the Swiss each formed their own league table and the winners from each country then matched themselves in the final. Basel won the Swiss Group and qualified for the final, however they were defeated by Lazio 1–3. The final was played in St. Jakob Stadium, Basel.

== Players ==
Note: Flags indicate national team as defined under FIFA eligibility rules; some limited exceptions apply. Players may hold more than one non-FIFA nationality.

No.	Pos.	Nation	Player
1	GK	SUI	Marcel Kunz (league games: 23)
1	GK	FRA	Jean-Paul Laufenburger (league games 3)
2	FW	SUI	Peter Wenger (league games: 15)
3	DF	SUI	Walter Mundschin (league games/goals: 26/6)
4	MF	SUI	Peter Ramseier (league games/goals: 26/1)
5	MF	SUI	Urs Siegenthaler (league games: 26)
6	MF	GER	Jürgen Sundermann (league games/goals: 13/5)
7	FW	SUI	Walter Balmer (league games/goals: 26/14)
8	MF	SUI	Karl Odermatt (league games/goals: 22/9)
9	FW	SUI	Rolf Blättler (from Lugano, league games/goals: 18/7)
10	DF	SUI	René Hasler (from Zürich, league games/goals: 26/2)
11	MF	SUI	Otto Demarmels (league games/goals: 25/4)
11	FW	GER	Ottmar Hitzfeld (from FV Lörrach, league games/goals: 24/16)

No.	Pos.	Nation	Player
13	MF	SUI	Bruno Rahmen (league games: 15)
14	DF	SUI	Jörg Stohler (league games: 4)
—	GK	SUI	Roland Dahinden (goalkeeper reserves)
—	DF	SUI	Paul Fischli (league games: 6)
—	DF	GER	Josef Kiefer (league games: 10)
—	DF	SUI	Roland Paolucci (league games: 0)
—	DF	SUI	Alex Wirth (reserves)
—	MF	GER	Helmut Benthaus (league games: 1)
—	DF	SUI	Bernard Bula (reserves)
—	DF	SUI	Guy Castelan (reserves)
—	FW	GER	Stefan Reisch (reserves)
—	FW	SUI	Rolf Riner (league games: 3)
—	FW	GER	Helmut Hauser (league games: 0)

Players who left the squad

Note: Flags indicate national team as defined under FIFA eligibility rules; some limited exceptions apply. Players may hold more than one non-FIFA nationality.

No. / Pos. / Nation / Player; — / MF / SUI / Edoardo Manzoni (to Xamax (end of loan))	No. / Pos. / Nation / Player; 6 / MF / GER / Jürgen Sundermann (to Servette during winter break)

== Results ==
Legend

Win Draw Loss Postponed

=== Friendly matches ===
==== Pre-season ====
17 July 1971 Pre-season	Winterthur (Switzerland)	3–4	(Switzerland) Basel	Schoeller-Meyer Fussballplatz Brunnen
	Nusch (2x); Huttary (1x)	Summary	(2x) Balmer (1x) Hauser (1x) Riner	Attendance: 1,000; Referee: (Switzerland) Anton Bucheli Luzern

25 July 1971 Pre-season	Freiburger FC (West Germany)	1–4	(Switzerland) Basel	Nonnenholz, Weil am Rhein
	von de Fenn 5' (1:0)	Summary	39' (1:1) Ramseier; 51' (1:2) Hauser; 72' (1:3) Hauser; 87' (1:4) Odermatt	Attendance: 2,000; Referee: (West Germany) Kurt Woldrich

31 July 1971 Pre-season	Sochaux (France)	5–3	(Switzerland) Basel	Courtemaîche
	Burdino 3' (1:0); Selic 10' (2:0); Lech 21' (3:0); Selic 32' (4:0); Piat 36' (5:1)	Summary	34' (4:1) Demarmels; 56' (pen. 5:2) Sundermann; 60' (o.g.)	Attendance: 3,000; Referee: (Switzerland) Gérard Racine Biel/Bienne

5 August 1971 Uhrencup	Basel (Switzerland)	5–0	(Switzerland) Biel-Bienne	Stadion Brühl, Grenchen
20:00	Odermatt 17' (1:0); Balmer 20' (2:0); Kiefer 50' (3:0); Balmer 63' (4:0); Odermatt 75' (pen. 5:0)	Summary		Attendance: 4,500; Referee: (Switzerland) Hans Wieland Grenchen

7 August 1971 Uhrencup	Grenchen (Switzerland)	3–1	(Switzerland) Basel	Stadion Brühl, Grenchen
20:00	Muhmenthaler 15' (1:0); Lander 80' (2:1); Schaller 85' (3:1)	Summary	63' (1:1) Wenger	Attendance: 7,000; Referee: (Switzerland) Rudolf Scheurer Bettlach

11 August 1971 Pre-season	Basel (Switzerland)	3–2	(West Germany) Karlsruher SC	Stadion Schützenmatte, Basel
	Balmer 9' (1:0); Hitzfeld 57' (2:1); Wenger 77' (3:2)	Summary	42' (1:1) Haunstein; 62' (2:2) Hechler	Attendance: 3,500; Referee: (Switzerland) Kurt Fuchs Basel

==== Winter break ====
25 January 1972 Winter break	Rajaprachanukraw (Thailand)	2–3	(Switzerland) Basel	National Stadium, Bangkok
19:00	Prapon Tantariyanond 33' (1:1); Pen Phath 58' (2:1)	Summary	Blättler 9' (0:1); Mundschin 79' (2:2); Rahmen 89' (2:3)	Attendance: 6,000

2 February 1972 Winter break	Basel (Switzerland)	1–0	(Switzerland) Monthey	Landhof, Basel
14:30	Rahmen 30' (1:0)	Summary		Attendance: 600; Referee: (Switzerland) Josef Schnidrig

13 February 1972 Winter break	Basel (Switzerland)	5–1	(Switzerland) Biel-Bienne	Landhof, Basel
14:30	Wenger 30' (1:0); Rahmen 57' (2:0); Odermatt 65' (3:0); Balmer 75' (4:1); Blättler 88' (5:1)	Summary	70' (3:1) Boillat	Attendance: 1,000; Referee: (Switzerland) Peter Hänggi Aesch

16 February 1972 Winter break	Basel (Switzerland)	4–0	(West Germany) Freiburger FC	St. Jakob Stadium, Basel
20:00	Balmer 57' (1:0); Odermatt 68' (pen. 2:0); Hasler 69' (3:0); Rahmen 84' (4:0)	Summary		Attendance: 500; Referee: (Switzerland) Mario Clematide Zollikofen

27 February 1972 Winter break	Basel (Switzerland)	2–1	(Switzerland) Winterthur	Landhof, Basel
14:30	Rahmen 57' (1:1); Blättler 78' (2:1)	Summary	57' (0:1) Nusch	Attendance: 1,500; Referee: (Switzerland) Jean Dubach Nidau

1 March 1972 Winter break	Karlsruher SC (West Germany)	1–4	(Switzerland) Basel	Karlsruhe
	Becker 8' (1:0)	Summary	10' (1:1) Rahmen; 49' (1:2) Blättler; 63' (1:3) Blättler; 84' (1:4) Hitzfeld	Attendance: 500

1 March 1972 Winter break	Old Boys (Switzerland)	0–10	(Switzerland) Basel	Basel
		Summary	(3x) Balmer (4x) Hitzfeld (1x) Odermatt (1x) Ramseier (1x) Riner

=== Nationalliga ===
==== League matches ====
14 August 1971 Round 1	Basel	0–0	Grenchen	St. Jakob Stadium, Basel
20:00		Summary		Attendance: 14,000; Referee: (Switzerland) René Matthieu

21 August 1971 Round 2	Servette	0–2	Basel	Charmilles Stadium, Geneva
20:30		Summary	10' (0:1) Hitzfeld; (yellow card) 43' Mundschin; 47' (0:2) Hitzfeld	Attendance: 11,000; Referee: (Switzerland) Jean Dubach Nidau

28 August 1971 Round 3	St. Gallen	1–1	Basel	Espenmoos, St. Gallen
20:15	Rafreider 3' (1:0)	[ Summary]	54' (1:1) Demarmels	Attendance: 9,000; Referee: (Switzerland) André Favre Echallens

4 September 1971 Round 4	Basel	3–1	Lugano	St. Jakob Stadium, Basel
20:00	Balmer 5' (1:0); Hitzfeld 66' (2:1); Sundermann 86' (3:1)	Summary	33' (1:1) Riehn	Attendance: 20,000; Referee: (Switzerland) Karl Göppel Zürich

11 September 1971 Round 5	Sion	3–3	Basel	Stade Tourbillon, Sion
20:15	Mathez 28' (1:1); Luisier 62' (2:2); Wampfler 90+1' (3:3)	Summary	24' (pen. 0:1) Sundermann; 35' (1:2) Hitzfeld; 68' (2:3) Balmer	Attendance: 6,500; Referee: (Switzerland) Pius Kamber Zürich

18 September 1971 Round 6	Basel	2–1	Grasshopper Club	St. Jakob Stadium, Basel
20:00	Odermatt 25' (1:0); Balmer 55' (2:0)	Summary	(yellow card) 11' Schneeberger; (yellow card) 26' Meier; (yellow card) 55' Citherlet; Ohlhauser 83' (2:1)	Attendance: 26,000; Referee: (Switzerland) Roland Keller Bern

2 October 1971 Round 7	Biel-Bienne	1–2	Basel	Gurzelen Stadion, Biel/Bienne
20:15	Heutschi 43' (pen. 1:0)	Summary	61' (o.g. 1:1); 84' (1:2) Balmer	Attendance: 8,000; Referee: (Switzerland) Walter Gallmann Oberrieden

6 October 1971 Round 8	Basel	1–1	Lausanne-Sport	St. Jakob Stadium, Basel
20:00	Demarmels 20' (1:1)	Summary	17' (0:1) Vuillemier	Attendance: 20,000; Referee: (Switzerland) Anton Bucheli Luzern

17 October 1971 Round 9	Winterthur	2–4	Basel	Schützenwiese, Winterthur
15:00	Dimmeler 56' (1:2); Dimmeler 58' (2:2)	Summary	13' (0:1) Balmer; 33' (pen. 0:2) Sundermann; 67' (2:3) Balmer; 76' (2:4) Balmer	Attendance: 10,500; Referee: (Switzerland) Gérard Racine Biel/Bienne

30 October 1971 Round 10	Basel	6–2	La Chaux-de-Fonds	St. Jakob Stadium, Basel
20:00	Odermatt 10' (1:0); Odermatt 17' (2:0); Hasler 44' (3:1); Demarmels 45' (4:1); Sundermann 4605:1'; Odermatt 60' (6:1)	Summary	23' (2:2) Portner; 67' (6:2) Meury	Attendance: 9,000; Referee: (Switzerland) Ulysse Darbellay Roche

14 November 1971 Round 11	Luzern	1–2	Basel	Stadion Allmend, Luzern
14:30	Milder 83' (1:2)	Summary	8' (pen- 0:1) Sundermann; 82' (0:2) Odermatt	Attendance: 6,500; Referee: (Switzerland) Roland Racine Prilly

28 November 1971 Round 12	Basel	1–1	Young Boys	St. Jakob Stadium, Basel
14:30	Balmer 21' (1:0); (yellow card) 83' Odermatt	Summary	78' (1:1) Müller; (yellow card) 87' Bruttin	Attendance: 18,000; Referee: (Switzerland) Walter Hungerbühler St. Gallen

5 December 1971 Round 13	Zürich	3–3	Basel	Hardturm, Zürich
14:30	Jeandupeux 2' (1:0); Rutschmann 16' (2:0); Künzli 56' (3:1)	Summary	29' (2:1) Balmer; (yellow card) 32' Hitzfeld; 76' (o.g. 3:2) Kyburz; 84' (3:3) Mundschin	Attendance: 32,000; Referee: (Switzerland) Roland Keller Bern

5 March 1972 Round 14	Grenchen	0–2	Basel	Stadion Brühl, Grenchen
14:45		Summary	29' (0:1) Demarmels; 86' (0:2) Balmer	Attendance: 10,500; Referee: (Switzerland) André Favre Echallens

19 March 1972 Round 15	Basel	5–1	Servette	St. Jakob Stadium, Basel
14:30	Hitzfeld 34' (1:1); Mundschin 37' (2:1); Odermatt 52' (3:1); (yellow card) 57' Ramseier; Blättler 60' (4:1); Blättler 61' (5:1)	Summary	11' (0:1) Desbiolles	Attendance: 17,000; Referee: (Switzerland) Ernest Guignet Yverdon

25 March 1972 Round 16	Basel	3–0	St. Gallen	St. Jakob Stadium, Basel
20:00	Balmer 40' (1:0); Hitzfeld 66' (2:0); Odermatt 69' (3:0)	Summary		Attendance: 15,000; Referee: (Switzerland) Gérard Racine Biel/Bienne

4 April 1972 Round 17	Lugano	0–3	Basel	Cornaredo, Lugano
20:30	Scacchi (yellow card); Binetti (yellow card); Prosperi (yellow card)	Summary	39' (0:1) Ramseier; 59' (0:2) Blättler; 72' (0:3) Blättler	Attendance: 6,000; Referee: (Switzerland) René Matthieu

15 April 1972 Round 18	Basel	3–0	Sion	St. Jakob Stadium, Basel
20:00	Blättler 49' (1:0); Mundschin 64' (2:0); Hitzfeld 73' (3:0)	Summary		Attendance: 10,500; Referee: (Switzerland) Mario Clematide Zollikofen

23 April 1972 Round 19	Grasshopper Club	1–2	Basel	Hardturm, Zürich
15:30	Meier 24' (1:0); Meyer (yellow card) 54'	Summary	37' (1:1) Hitzfeld; 53' (1:2) Hitzfeld; (yellow card) 81' Ramseier	Attendance: 13,500; Referee: (Switzerland) Roland Keller Bern

29 April 1972 Round 20	Basel	6–2	Biel-Bienne	St. Jakob Stadium, Basel
17:30	Hitzfeld 36' (1:0); Mundschin 54' (2:0); Blättler 60' (3:0); Hitzfeld 63' (4:0); Hitzfeld 71' (5:0); Balmer 89' (6:2)	Summary	76' (5:1) Rodekurth; 80' (5:2) Rebmann	Attendance: 10,300; Referee: (Switzerland) Roland Racine Prilly

6 May 1972 Round 21	Lausanne-Sport	1–1	Basel	Olympique de la Pontaise, Lausanne
20:30	Guggisberg 12' (1:0)	Summary	45' (1:1) Hasler; (yellow card) 88' Rahmen	Attendance: 18,000; Referee: (Switzerland) Gérard Racine Biel/Bienne

13 May 1972 Round 22	Basel	2–1	Winterthur	St. Jakob Stadium, Basel
20:00	Hitzfeld 34' (1:0); Hitzfeld 36' (2:0)	Summary	82' (2:1) Meili	Attendance: 12,700; Referee: (Switzerland) Jean Dubach Nidau

16 May 1972 Round 23	La Chaux-de-Fonds	1–3	Basel	Stade Charrière, La Chaux-de-Fonds
20:15	Portner 77' (1:3)	Summary	10' (0:1) Mundschin; 43' (0:2) Balmer; 61' (0:3) Hitzfeld	Attendance: 4,000; Referee: (Switzerland) Roland Keller Bern

27 May 1972 Round 24	Basel	1–0	Luzern	St. Jakob Stadium, Basel
20:15	Balmer 35' (1:0)	Summary		Attendance: 12,500; Referee: (Switzerland) Fernand Burioli Lausanne

7 June 1972 Round 25	Young Boys	4–1	Basel	Wankdorf Stadium, Bern
17:30	Brenninger 52' (1:1); Brenninger 58' (2:1); Müller (yellow card) 71'; Müller 77' (3:1); Schild 79' (4:1)	Summary	38' (0:1) Blättler	Attendance: 22,000; Referee: (Switzerland) Bruno Della Bruna Lumino

10 June 1972 Round 26	Basel	4–0	Zürich	St. Jakob Stadium, Basel
20:15	Mundschin 20' (1:0); Odermatt 40 pen. 2:0'; Hitzfeld 79' (3:0); Odermatt 87' (4:0)	Summary		Attendance: 56,000; Referee: (Switzerland) Walter Hungerbühler St. Gallen

==== League standings ====
Pos	Team	Pld	W	D	L	GF	GA	GD	Pts	Qualification
1	Basel (C)	26	18	7	1	66	28	+38	43	Swiss champions, qualified for 1972–73 European Cup
2	Zürich	26	17	5	4	55	28	+27	39	Swiss Cup winners, qualified for 1972–73 Cup Winners' Cup and entered 1972 Intertoto Cup
3	Grasshopper Club	26	16	6	4	56	24	+32	38	Qualified for 1972–73 UEFA Cup and entered 1972 Intertoto Cup
4	Lausanne-Sport	26	11	8	7	50	36	+14	30	Qualified for 1972–73 UEFA Cup
5	Young Boys	26	12	5	9	46	31	+15	29	Entered 1972 Intertoto Cup
6	Winterthur	26	12	4	10	37	32	+5	28	Entered 1972 Intertoto Cup
7	Sion	26	9	8	9	37	36	+1	26	
8	Servette	26	10	5	11	39	47	−8	25	
9	Lugano	26	8	7	11	33	39	−6	23	
10	Grenchen	26	6	11	9	27	40	−13	23	
11	La Chaux-de-Fonds	26	7	7	12	25	45	−20	21	
12	St. Gallen	26	4	7	15	27	46	−19	15	
13	Luzern	26	6	3	17	24	49	−25	15	Relegated to Nationalliga B
14	Biel-Bienne	26	2	5	19	26	67	−41	9	Relegated to Nationalliga B

Source: rsssf.com
(C) Champions

=== Swiss Cup ===
23 October 1971 Round of 32	Basel	3–1	Monthey	St. Jakob Stadium, Basel
20:00	Hitzfeld 39' (1:1); Odermatt 42' (2:1); Blättler 80' (3:1)	Summary	21' (0:1) Messerli	Attendance: 4,891; Referee: (Switzerland) Roland Racine Prilly

21 November Round of 16	La Chaux-de-Fonds	0–3	Basel	St. Jakob Stadium, Basel
14:30		Summary	Blättler 34' (1:0); Hitzfeld 73' (2:0); Blättler 79' (3:0)	Attendance: 4,500; Referee: (Switzerland) André Favre Echallens

12 March 1972 Quarter-final	Grasshopper-Club	1–1 (a.e.t.)	Basel	Hardturm, Zürich
14:30	Meier 56' (1:0)	Summary	66' (1:1) Rahmen; (yellow card) 97' Hasler	Attendance: 16,000; Referee: (Switzerland) Bruno Della Bruna Lumino

15 March 1972 Quarter-final replay	Basel	3–2	Grasshopper-Club	St. Jakob Stadium, Basel
20:00	Hasler 7' (1:0); Rahmen 77' (2:1); Hitzfeld 78' (3:1)	Summary	53' (1:1) Müller; 88' (3:2) Meier	Attendance: 33,000; Referee: (Switzerland) Walter Hungerbühler St. Gallen

3 April 1972 Semi-final	BSC Young Boys	0–2	Basel	Wankdorf Stadium, Bern
	Messerli (yellow card) 39'		5' (1:0) Karl Odermatt; (yellow card) 39' Hitzfeld; 82' (2:0) Walter Balmer	Attendance: 50,000; Referee: (Switzerland) Walter Gallmann Oberrieden

22 May 1972 Final	Zürich	1–0 (a.e.t.)	Basel	Wankdorf, Bern
14:30	Jeandupeux 113'; Jeandupeux (yellow card) 91'	Summary		Attendance: 45,000; Referee: (Switzerland) Rudolf Scheurer Bettlach

=== UEFA Cup ===
First round

15 September 1971 First leg	Basel (Switzerland)	1–2	(Spain) Real Madrid	St. Jakob Stadium, Basel
20:00	Hasler 32'; Ramseier (yellow card) 48'	UEFA report FCB Summary	(yellow card) 27' Grosso; 33' Aguilar; 75' Santillana	Attendance: 32,059; Referee: (England) Kenneth Howard Burns

29 September 1971 Second leg	Real Madrid (Spain)	2–1 (4–2 agg.)	(Switzerland) Basel	Santiago Bernabéu Stadium
21:00	Aguilar 48'; Santillana 78'	UEFA report FCB Summary	57' Siegenthaler	Attendance: 61,861; Referee: (Italy) Aurelio Angonese

Real Madrid won 4–2 on aggregate.

=== Cup of the Alps ===
==== Matches ====
12 June 1971 Round 1	Hellas Verona (Italy)	3–2	(Switzerland) Basel	Stadio Marc'Antonio Bentegodi, Verona
	Orazi 7' (1:0); Clerici 40' (2:2); Clerici 46' (pen. 3:2)	Summary	21' (1:1) Mundschin; 30' (1:2) Hauser	Attendance: 8,000; Referee: (Switzerland) Pius Kamber Zürich

15 June 1971 Round 2	Varese (Italy)	0–1	(Switzerland) Basel	Stadio Franco Ossola, Varese
	Della Giovanna (yellow card)	Summary	75' Stohler	Attendance: 3,000; Referee: (Switzerland) Claudio Laich Massagno

19 June 1971 Round 3	Basel (Switzerland)	4–1	(Italy) Hellas Verona	St. Jakob Stadium, Basel
20:00	Balmer 17' (1:0); Balmer 36' (2:1); Demarmels 50' (3:1); Odermatt (yellow card) 59'; Balmer 69' (4:1); Demarmels (yellow card) 88'	Summary	19' (1:1) Orazi; (yellow card) 30' Gobbi	Attendance: 6,000; Referee: (Italy) Luciano Giunti

22 June 1971 Round 4	Basel (Switzerland)	0–1	(Italy) Varese	St. Jakob Stadium, Basel
22:00		Summary	21' Morini	Attendance: 8,000; Referee: (Italy) Paolo Toselli

==== Final Table Switzerland ====
Pos	Team	Pld	W	D	L	GF	GA	GD	Pts	
1	Basel	4	2	0	2	7	5	+2	11	Advance to final
2	Lugano	4	1	1	2	5	9	−4	8	
3	Lausanne Sports	4	1	1	2	4	5	−1	7	
4	Winterthur	4	0	1	3	4	12	−8	5	

Source: https://www.rsssf.org/tablesa/alpi71.html rsssf.com
Rules for classification: 2 points for win, 1 point for draw, and 1 point for each goal scored

==== Final ====
The Final was played in St. Jakob Stadium, Basel, between the winner of the Italien and the winner of the Swiss groups.

25 June 1971 Final	Basel (Switzerland)	1–3	(Italy) Lazio	St. Jakob Stadium, Basel
20:00	Wenger 41' (1:1)	Summary	22' (0:1) Manservisi; 76' (1:2) Chinaglia; 86' (pen. 1:3) Chinaglia	Attendance: 12,500; Referee: (West Germany) Hans-Joachim Weyland

== See also ==
- History of FC Basel
- List of FC Basel players
- List of FC Basel seasons
