= Otto Demarmels =

Swiss footballer (born 1948)

Personal information
- Full name: Otto Demarmels
- Date of birth: 29 August 1948 (age 78)
- Place of birth: St. Gallen Switzerland
- Positions: Defender; midfielder

Youth career
- FC Pratteln

Senior career*
Years	Team	Apps	(Gls)
until 1967	FC Pratteln		
1967–1982	FC Basel	307	(49)

International career
1972–1977	Switzerland	16	(0)
- * Club domestic league appearances and goals

Otto Demarmels (born 29 August 1948) is a retired Swiss footballer who played for 15 seasons for FC Basel. He played mainly in the position as defensive midfielder or as defender.

== Club career ==
Demarmels played youth football by FC Pratteln and moved up to their first team in 1966. In that season they played 2. Liga (fourth tier of Swiss football) and he scored 40 goals for his team. A year later he transferred to FC Basel. Because his new team had just won the Swiss championship he had to wait some time before he was able to play. He played his debut for Basel on 16 September 1967 in the Nationalliga A home game at the Landhof against Young Fellows Zürich. He scored his first goal for his club in the same match, it was the winning goal as Basel won 1–0. It was a very special goal not only for the fact that it was the only goal of the match, but also because it was the last goal that Basel scored in their old stadium. Afterwards all games were played in the St. Jakob Stadium. In the very next game Demarmels also scored his next goal, it was the team's fourth as Basel won 4–1 against Zürich. In his first season for Basel he played 12 games in the domestic league scoring six goals.

In his second season with Basel (1968–69) Demarmels still did not become regular starter as they won the championship under player-manager Helmut Benthaus. The team finished the season one point clear of second placed Lausanne Sports. Basel won 13 of their 26 games, drawing ten, losing three times, they scored 48 goals conceding 28. However he did play 8 domestic league games scoring two goals and he played various games in the Swiss Cup and the Cup of the Alps.

Demarmels won the championship with Basel for the second time at the end of the season 1969–70. The team again finished one point clear of Lausanne Sports who ended the season in second position again. Basel won 15 of the 26 games, drawing seven, losing four times, they scored 59 and conceded 23 goals. Demarmels played 11 league games, scoring one goal, again he played various games in the Swiss Cup and played in the European Cup match in Glasgow against Celtic. He also played two games in the 1969 Cup of the Alps, in which Basel won the final against Bologna.

In his fourth season by the club Demarmels played 14 games in the domestic league (two goals) and two in the domestic cup (one goal). Basel finished the regular season level on points with Grasshopper Club Zürich and so they contested a play-off game on 8 June 1971 to decide the title winners. Grasshopper won the play-off 4–3 after extra time. In the 1970 Cup of the Alps Demarmels played two games but he missed playing in the final in which Basel won 3–2 against Fiorentina.

In Basel's 1971–72 season Demarmels became regular starter in the first team. In the pre-season 1971 Cup of the Alps he played four of the five games, scoring one goal, but he missed playing in the final in which Basel were defeated by Lazio. He played 25 of the 26 league matches, scoring four goals. The team won the championship four points clear of FC Zürich who ended the season in second position. Basel won 18 of the 26 games, drawing seven, losing only once, scoring 66 and conceded 28 goals. For Demarmels this was the third championship title. The Swiss Cup final was played on 22 May 1972 in the Wankdorf Stadium but Basel were defeated 0–1 by Zürich through a goal by Daniel Jeandupeux in extra time.

The 1972 Swiss League Cup was the inaugural Swiss League Cup competition. It was played in the summer of 1972 as a pre-season tournament to the 1972–73 Swiss football season. Basel beat Servette 8–0, Lausanne Sports 2–1 aet and Sion 6–1 to reach the final. This was won by Basel who defeated FC Winterthur 4–1 in the final which took place on 11 November 1972 at the Letzigrund in Zürich. Demarmels played in all four League Cup games and scored two goals in the semi-final against Sion. Ottmar Hitzfeld scored a hattick in the final. Again in their 1972–73 season Basel won the championship. Winning his fourth championship title, Demarmels played in all 26 league matches, scoring three goals. The team won 17 games, drew five and were defeated four times. They scored 57 goals, conceding 30. Ottmar Hitzfeld was the team and the league top scorer with 18 goals. Basel won the championship four points clear of Grasshopper Club who finished in second position. In the Swiss Cup Basel reached the final, which was played on 23 April 1973 in the Wankdorf Stadium against Zürich. The game ended goalless after 90 minutes. In extra time Peter Marti (92) and Fritz Künzli (101) scored the goals to give Zürich the title for the second consecutive time in a final against Basel.

The following season was not very successful. In the 1973–74 season Basel finished the championship in fifth position, in the Swiss Cup they reached the quarter-finals. Demarmels played 22 league games and netted once and in the cup he played all four games also netting once. In the 1974–75 season championship the team finished in fourth position. But in the 50th edition of the Swiss Cup tournament they reached the final. The final was played on 31 March 1975 also in the Wankdorf Stadium in Bern against Winterthur. Otto Demarmels scored the opening goal for Basel, Meyer equalised and so the game went into extra time. Walter Balmer scored the winning goal for Basel after 115 minutes. Basel were Swiss Cup winners for the fifth time in the club's history.

Basel finished the 1975–76 league championship in third position with 34 points, 10 points behind FC Zürich. Of the 26 games, 13 were won, 8 drawn, 5 lost, with 59 goals and 38 conceded. Due to injuries Demarmels played only 19 games scoring two goals. In the Cup the team won in the round of 32, but lost in the round of 16, Demarmels played only 28 minutes in the match against the Young Boys and was substituted in as his team was already three goals behind. In the Swiss League Cup he only played one game. In the 1975–76 European Cup Winners' Cup he played both games as Basel were knocked out of the competition by Atlético Madrid. In the Cup of the Alps he played in four of the games. Basel won the group, but were beaten in the final by Servette.

For Demarmels the 1976–77 was again a very successful season. The league format was changed. Instead of 14 teams playing a single round robin, it now was reduced to 12 teams with a Qualifying phase and a championship round with the six top teams. This meant no longer 26 games, but now 22 plus 10. In the Qualifying phase Basel obtained 33 points and were just two points behind Servette. They managed to close the gap in the championship round and because both teams were level on points the championship was decided in a play-off match. This match was held on 26 June 1977. Basels goals were scored by Mundschin and von Wartburg as they won 2–1 and became Swiss champions. In the league Demarmels played 29 matches scoring seven goals. In the 1976–77 UEFA Cup Demarmels played both first-round games against Glentoran F.C. and he scored a goal in the return leg. Basel won 5–3 on aggregate.

During the season 1977–78 Demarmels played 31 games including the test games and netted four times. The team finished the championship in third position. In both the national cup competitions they reached the semi-final but lost both. During the 1978–79 season he played 54 games with ten goals. Basel ended the league season sixth position after playing a disappointing championship round, losing six of the last seven games.

The season 1979–80 Nationalliga A was an exiting season. After the Qualifying phase Servette, Grasshopper Club and Basel were within three points of each other. The close rivalry remained until the end of the season. In the second last game Basel were hosts to Servette, winning 1–0, and in the last away against Zürich, winning 4–2. Basel became champions and were two points ahead of both Grasshoppers and Servette who finished second and third respectively. The team scored 91 league goals all in all. The team's top scorers were Detlev Lauscher, Joseph Küttel and Erni Maissen who each scored 18 league goals during the campaign. Demarmels scored 9 in 28 outings and this was his sixth league championship title.

Demarmels played two more seasons for Basel. In the season 1980–81 he had 21 league appearances scoring two goals and in the 1981–82 season he had 26 league appearances also scoring twice.

In the 15 years in which Demarmels played for Basel, he played a total of 508 games for the club scoring a total of 104 goals. 307 of these games were in the Nationalliga A, 72 games were in the two domestic cups, 67 were in European competitions and 134 games were test games. 49 of the goals were in the domestic league, 13 were in the cups, 13 were in European competitions and the other 31 were in the tests. He won the Swiss championship six times, the Swiss Cup once, the Swiss League Cup once and twice the Cup of the Alps and twice the Uhren Cup.

== International career ==
Demarmels played 16 times for the Switzerland national team. He played his debut for his country on 26 April 1972 in the home test game at the Charmilles Stadium in Geneva against Sweden. The game ended in a 1–1 draw. He played in five World Cup qualification games in the season 1972–73 and another World Cup qualifier in 1977. His last international appearance was on 5 October 1977 in a successful test game (2:0) at the Hardturm in Zürich against Finland.

== Private life ==
Outside his football career Demarmels first worked for Sport Gerspach, where he had completed his apprenticeship. In all of his years as a top football player, he worked full-time, trainings started at 18:00 hours. Later he worked for three years in the marketing department of the FC Basel. Then former teammate Bruno Michaud enticed him into and taught him about the insurance industry. After initial skepticism, he found so much pleasure in the brokerage profession that he started his own business which he ran 18 years until the end of 2017.

== Honours ==
- Swiss League: 1968-69, 1969-70, 1971-72, 1972-73, 1976-77, 1979-80
- Swiss Cup: 1974–75
- Swiss League Cup: 1972
- Cup of the Alps winner: 1969, 1970
- Uhren Cup winner: 1969, 1970
