= Roland Paolucci =

Swiss footballer (born 1947)

Personal information
- Full name: Roland Paolucci
- Date of birth: 22 September 1947
- Place of birth: Bern
- Position: Defender

Senior career*
Years	Team	Apps	(Gls)
1965–1975	FC Basel	65	(4)
1972–1973	→ FC Winterthur (loan)	22	(2)
1975–1976	FC Nordstern Basel	19	(1)

Managerial career
- 1976–1980: FC Zwingen
- 1980–1981: FC Laufenburg-Kaisten
- 1981–1983: SV Muttenz
- 1983–1985: FC Reinach
- from 1985: FC Concordia Basel (youth) and FC Basel (youth)
- from 1993: FC Internazionale Basel and FC Laufenburg-Kaisten
- * Club domestic league appearances and goals

Roland Paolucci (born 22 September 1947) is a retired Swiss footballer who played for FC Basel during the 1960s and early 1970s. During this time he was loaned out for one season to Winterthur and he ended his playing career playing for Nordstern Basel. He played mainly in the position as defender but also as defensive midfielder. He was player-manager for a few regional clubs in the late 1970s, was youth trainer and later became President of SV Muttenz. In 2006 he was appointed into the regional section of the Swiss Football Association and became president of the FVNWS (North West section) for 13 years.

== Football career ==
Paolucci started his youth football by FC Basel in 1962. In 1965 he moved up to their first team. In the first two years he played mainly for the reserve team, but also played for the first team in various test matches and in the Cup of the Alps competition. He played his Nationalliga A debut for the club on 22 October 1967 in the home match against Biel-Bienne. Basel won the match 4–0. He also scored his first goal for the club against Biel-Bienne, in the return match on 11 May 1968. But despite his goal, this time his team was defeated.

Paolucci then became regular starter in the first team and in Basel's 1968–69 season they won the championship under player-manager Helmut Benthaus. They finished the season one point clear of second placed Lausanne Sports. Basel won 13 of their 26 games, drawing ten, losing three times, they scored 48 goals conceding 28. Paolucci played 22 championship games scoring one goal, this being the equaliser in the home game against Winterthur after Friedhelm Konietzka had put the visitors one up.

He won the championship with Basel for the second time at the end of the season 1969–70. The team again finished one point clear of Lausanne Sports who ended the season in second position again. Basel won 15 of the 26 games, drawing seven, losing four times, they scored 59 and conceded 23 goals. During this season Paolucci played 15 league matches. During the following season he had very only a few appearances and a serious knee injury kept him out of the next season entirely.

To help his recovery and to let him get some playing experience, Basel loaned Paolucci out to Winterthur. Sportingly this was probably his best season. The 1972 Swiss League Cup was the inaugural Swiss League Cup competition. It was played in the summer of 1972 as a pre-season tournament to the 1972–73 Swiss football season. Winterthur proceeded to the final, which took place on 11 November 1972 at the Letzigrund in Zürich, ironically against Basel. Basel won the game 4–1. Ottmar Hitzfeld scored a hattick, Walter Balmer scored the other, Eigil Nielsen scored the only goal for Winterthur. During this season Paolucci played 22 domestic league games in which he scored two goals.

After his loan ended, Paolucci returned to Basel for a further two seasons, but could never manage to hold his starting position in the team. In the 1974–75 season Basel won the Swiss Cup but Paulucci did not figure in the line up. Altogether between the years 1965 and 1975 Paolucci played a total of 133 games for Basel scoring a total of 13 goals. 65 of these games were in the Nationalliga A, 13 in the Swiss Cup, 19 were on European level (European Cup, Cup of the Alps, Inter-Cities Fairs Cup) and 36 were friendly games. He scored four goals in the domestic league, two in the Swiss Cup, four in the Cup of the Alps and the other three were scored during the test games.

Paolucci ended his professional football career playing for Nordstern Basel in the Nationalliga B during the 1975–1976 season.

== Coaching and managerial career ==
Following his professional football career, Paolucci obtained his trainer diplome. He was player-manager for various amateur clubs. For four seasons from 1976 until 1980 by FC Zwingen. During the season 1980–1981 for FC Laufenburg-Kaisten. From 1981 to 1983 for SV Muttenz and finally from 1983 to 1985 for FC Reinach. From 1985 onwards Paolucci was youth team trainer of the ′Inter A1′ class for FC Concordia Basel und FC Basel. From 1993 he was trainer of FC Internazionale Basel and FC Laufenburg.

== Football Association management ==
In 1996 Paolucci became president of SV Muttenz. His large network of contacts from his football career and his personal occupation helped him to win new patrons and sponsors for the club. He remained chairman of the Muttenz board of directors until 2005. His next step was a big one, to the Swiss Football Association. This is divided into local sections. Paolucci was president of the FVNWS (North West section) for 13 years from 12 August 2006 up until 9 August 2019. He is now honorary President.

== Personal life ==
Roland Paolucci was born and grew up first in Bern and later in Basel. His father Robert played football for FC Bern and, following the families move to Basel, his father was even on the FC Basel board of directors. Professionally Roland Paolucci was a commercial clerk in the transport industry and until retirement worked for and became member of the executive board for the firm Ziegler Schweiz AG. He was responsible for customer relationships.

== Honours ==
Basel

- Swiss League champions: 1968–69, 1969–70, 1971–72
- Swiss Cup winner: 1974–75
- Swiss Cup runner-up: 1969–70, 1971–72
- Cup of the Alps winner: 1969, 1970
- Uhren Cup winner: 1969, 1970

Winterthur

- Swiss League Cup runner-up: 1972

== Sources ==
- Rotblau: Jahrbuch Saison 2017/2018. Publisher: FC Basel Marketing AG. ISBN 978-3-7245-2189-1
- Die ersten 125 Jahre. Publisher: Josef Zindel im Friedrich Reinhardt Verlag, Basel. ISBN 978-3-7245-2305-5
- Verein "Basler Fussballarchiv" Homepage
