= 1967 Cup of the Alps =

1967 Coppa delle Alpi
Alpencup, Alpenpokal, Coupe des Alpes

Tournament details
- Country: Germany and Switzerland
- Teams: 8

Final positions
- Champions: Eintracht Frankfurt
- Runners-up: TSV 1860 Munich

Tournament statistics
- Matches played: 20
- Goals scored: 57 (2.85 per match)

1967 Coppa delle Alpi shows the results of the 1967 tournament that was held mainly in Germany and Switzerland in the preseason 1967/68. The Coppa delle Alpi (translated as Cup of the Alps) was a football tournament, jointly organized by the Italian national league and the Swiss League as a pre-season event.

Most of the games in the 1967 competition were played in Germany and Switzerland. There were three teams taking part from Italy AC Milan, AS Roma and Torino FC, two from Germany Eintracht Frankfurt and TSV 1860 Munich as well as three from Switzerland FC Basel, Servette FC and FC Zürich The teams played in one group. Each team only played against foreign teams.

== Matches ==
7 June 1967
21:00

TSV 1860 Munich (Germany)	0 – 0	(Italy) Torino FC
	(Report Torino)

Städtisches Stadion an der Grünwalder Straße, Munich
Attendance: 20,000
Referee: (Germany) Heumann

The match was abandoned after 79 minute due to a pitch invasion of 250 spectators. The match was credited as a 0–0 draw.
10 June 1967
18:15

Eintracht Frankfurt (Germany)	0 – 0	(Italy) Torino FC
	(Report Eintracht Frankfurt) (Report Torino)

Stadion an der Berliner Straße, Wiesbaden
Attendance: 12,000
Referee: (Germany) Tschenscher

14 June 1967
20:00

FC Basel (Switzerland)	0 – 1	(Italy) Torino FC
	(Report FC Basel) (Report Torino)	Ferrini 4'

St. Jakob-Park, Basel
Attendance: 7,000
Referee: (Switzerland) Kamber

15 June 1967

TSV 1860 Munich (Germany)	4 – 3	(Italy) AS Roma
Goal	(Report AS Roma)	Goal

Unknown, Augsburg

17 June 1967

Servette FC (Switzerland)	0 – 0	(Italy) AC Milan
	(Report Servette FC) (Report AC Milan)

Stade des Charmilles, Geneva
Attendance: 12,579

17 June 1967

FC Zürich (Switzerland)	1 – 2	(Italy) AS Roma
Goal	(FC Zürich)	Goal

Letzigrund, Zürich

20 June 1967
20:00

FC Basel (Switzerland)	0 – 2	(Italy) AS Roma
	(Report FC Basel)	7', 76' Barison

St. Jakob-Park, Basel
Attendance: 8,600
Referee: (Switzerland) Clematide

21 June 1967

FC Zürich (Switzerland)	2 – 5	(Germany) Eintracht Frankfurt
Künzli 33' (pen.); Leimgruber 85'	(Report Eintracht Frankfurt)	Solz 15', 21' (pen.); Huberts 26', 63'; Abbé 65'

Letzigrund, Zürich
Attendance: 2,500
Referee: (Switzerland) Heymann

21 June 1967

TSV 1860 Munich (Germany)	0 – 0	(Italy) AC Milan
	(Report AC Milan)

Städtisches Stadion an der Grünwalder Straße, Munich
Attendance: 10,000
Referee: Yakobi

21 June 1967
20:45

Servette FC (Switzerland)	2 – 1	(Italy) Torino FC
Nemeth 59'; Georgy 67'	(Report Torino)	Baisi 25'

Stade des Charmilles, Geneva
Attendance: 9,500
Referee: (Switzerland) Dienst

23 June 1967
20:00

FC Basel (Switzerland)	4 – 4	(Germany) TSV 1860 Munich
Hauser 8'; Rahmen 26'; Wenger 30'; Rüefli 33'	(Report FC Basel)	Bründl 19', 43'; Küppers 43'; Kohlars 54'

St. Jakob-Park, Basel
Attendance: 9,000
Referee: (Switzerland) Dienst

24 June 1967

Eintracht Frankfurt (Germany)	1 – 0	(Italy) AC Milan
Grabowski 13'	(Report Eintracht Frankfurt) (Report AC Milan)

Waldstadion, Frankfurt
Attendance: 14,000
Referee: (Germany) Radermacher

24 June 1967
20:00

FC Zürich (Switzerland)	1 – 1	(Italy) Torino FC
Künzli 47'	(Report Torino)	Puia 15'

Letzigrund, Zürich
Attendance: 6,000
Referee: (Switzerland) Beller

24 June 1967

Servette FC (Switzerland)	1 – 3	(Italy) AS Roma
Schindelholz	(Report Servette FC)	Goal

27 June 1967

Eintracht Frankfurt (Germany)	4 – 2	(Italy) AS Roma
Schämer 3', 41'; Huberts 8'; Grabowski 74'	(Report Eintracht Frankfurt)	Schütz 25'; Morelli 31'

Südweststadion, Ludwigshafen
Attendance: 18,000
Referee: (Germany) Spinnler

27 June 1967
20:00

FC Basel (Switzerland)	0 – 3	(Italy) AC Milan
	(Report FC Basel) (Report AC Milan)	Odermatt 25' (o.g.); Fortunato 68'; Trapattoni 69'

St. Jakob-Park, Basel
Attendance: 11,400
Referee: (Switzerland) Scheurer

30 June 1967

FC Zürich (Switzerland)	2 – 0	(Italy) AC Milan
Stürmer 51'; Künzli 62'	(Report AC Milan)

Letzigrund, Zürich
Attendance: 8,800
Referee: Grassi

9 August 1967

Servette FC (Switzerland)	1 – 0	(Switzerland) FC Zürich
Desbiolles	(Report Servette FC)

15 August 1967
20:00

FC Basel (Switzerland)	1 – 2	(Germany) Eintracht Frankfurt
Odermatt 74'	(Report FC Basel) (Report Eintracht Frankfurt)	Solz 53' (pen.); Bechtold 61'

St. Jakob-Park, Basel
Attendance: 14,000
Referee: (Switzerland) Droz

22 August 1967
20:45

Servette FC (Switzerland)	1 – 3	(Germany) TSV 1860 Munich
Heuri	(Report Servette FC)	Goal

== Table ==
Pos	Team	Pld	W	D	L	GF	GA	Pts
1	Eintracht Frankfurt	5	4	1	0	12	5	9
2	TSV 1860 Munich	5	2	3	0	11	8	7
3	AS Roma	5	3	0	2	12	10	6
4	Torino FC	5	1	3	1	3	3	5
5	Servette FC	5	2	1	2	5	7	5
6	AC Milan	5	1	2	2	2	3	4
7	FC Zürich	5	1	1	3	6	9	3
8	FC Basel	5	0	1	4	5	12	1

== Sources and References ==
- Cup of the Alps 1967 at RSSSF
- Alpenpokal 1967 at eintracht-archiv.de
- Alpencup at fcb-archiv.ch
- Stagione 1966/1967 at archiviotoro.it
- Coppa delle Alpi at magliarossonera.it
- Alpencup / Coupe des Alpes at super-servette.ch
