= Anton Schnider =

Swiss footballer (1936–2023)

Personal information
- Full name: Anton Schnider
- Date of birth: 22 October 1936
- Place of birth: Solothurn, Switzerland
- Date of death: 4 January 2023 (aged 86)
- Place of death: Muttenz, Switzerland
- Position: Midfielder

Senior career*
| Years | Team | Apps | (Gls) |
| 1955–1957 | FC Grenchen | 49 | (0) |
| 1957–1964 | BSC Young Boys | 128 | (3) |
| 1964–1966 | Servette FC | 42 | (6) |
| 1966–1969 | FC Basel | 34 | (1) |
| 1969–1970 | FC Concordia Basel | | |

International career
| 1959–1966 | Switzerland | 3 | (0) |
- * Club domestic league appearances and goals

Anton Schnider (22 October 1936 – 4 January 2023) was a Swiss international footballer who played in the 1950s and 1960s. He played as midfielder.

== Club career ==
Schnider first played for Grenchen during the 1955–56 Nationalliga A season, but the club suffered relegation. After the following season Schnider and his club managed promotion back to the highest flight of Swiss football. Schnider then moved on to play for Young Boys. He played for them for six seasons and Schnider won the Swiss Championship three times and the double in the 1957–58 season. Schnider moved on in the summer of 1964 to play for Servette. He played with Servette for two seasons, in which time the team reached the Swiss Cup final twice, but ended each as runners-up.

Schnider joined FC Basel's first team for their 1966–67 season under player-manager Helmut Benthaus. After playing in three test games, Schnider played his domestic league debut for the club in the home game at the Landhof on 21 August 1966 as Basel won 1–0 against Lugano. He scored his first goal for his club on 21 May 1967 in the home game as Basel won 4–1 against Biel-Bienne. Schnider won the Swiss championship title for the fourth time in his personal career at the end of this season. Basel finished the championship one point clear of FC Zürich who finished in second position. Basel won 16 of the 26 games, drawing eight, losing twice, and they scored 60 goals conceding just 20.

In the Swiss Cup final, in the former Wankdorf Stadium on 15 May 1967, Basel's opponents were Lausanne-Sports. Helmut Hauser scored the decisive goal via penalty. The game went down in football history due to the sit-down strike that followed this goal. After 88 minutes of play, with the score at 1–1, referee Karl Göppel awarded Basel a controversial penalty. André Grobéty had pushed Hauser gently in the back and he let himself drop theatrically. Subsequent to the 2–1 for Basel the Lausanne players refused to resume the game and they sat down demonstratively on the pitch. The referee had to abandon the match. Basel were awarded the cup with a 3–0 forfeit.

The following season Schnider was injured during a test game in the pre-season preparation. Although he recovered within two months and played in two Swiss Cup matches, he did not make it to a league match until March the following year. He played in just eight league matches that season. During his third season with Basel, although he played in the Cup of the Alps and various test matches, he played only one game in the domestic league. Between the years 1966 and 1969 Schnider played a total of 71 games for Basel scoring a total of four goals. 34 of these games were in the Nationalliga A, nine in the Swiss Cup, eight in the European competitions (European Cup, Cup of the Alps and Inter-Cities Fairs Cup) and 20 were friendly games. He scored one goal in the domestic league, the other three were scored during the test games.

Following his time with Basel, Schnider moved on to lower tier, local club Concordia Basel and ended his active professional football career.

After his active football he stayed with FCB for a number of years as a successful youth coach. In 1971 he won the Swiss youth championship for the first time in FCB's history with the Inter-A-Junior team, which included the players Markus Tanner and Alex Wirth. Toni Schnider last lived in a retirement home in Muttenz. He died on 4 January 2023 at the age of 86.

== International career ==
Schnider was first called up for the Swiss national team during the spring of 1959. He played for the team in the friendly match on 26 April 1959 as the team lost a friendly match against Yugoslavia. He played two other matches for the country on 26 May 1965 against Germany and on 22 October 1966 against Belgium.

== Honours and Titles ==
Grenchen

- Nationalliga B Promotion: 1956–57

Young Boys

- Swiss League champions: 1957–58, 1958–59, 1959–60
- Swiss Cup winner: 1957–58

Servette

- Swiss Cup runners-up; 1964–65, 1965–66

Basel

- Swiss League champions: 1966–67, 1968–69
- Swiss Cup winner: 1966–67

== Sources ==
- Rotblau: Jahrbuch Saison 2017/2018. Publisher: FC Basel Marketing AG. ISBN 978-3-7245-2189-1
- Die ersten 125 Jahre. Publisher: Josef Zindel im Friedrich Reinhardt Verlag, Basel. ISBN 978-3-7245-2305-5
- Verein "Basler Fussballarchiv" Homepage
