= Stadion Grüne Au =

Multi-use stadium in Hof, Germany

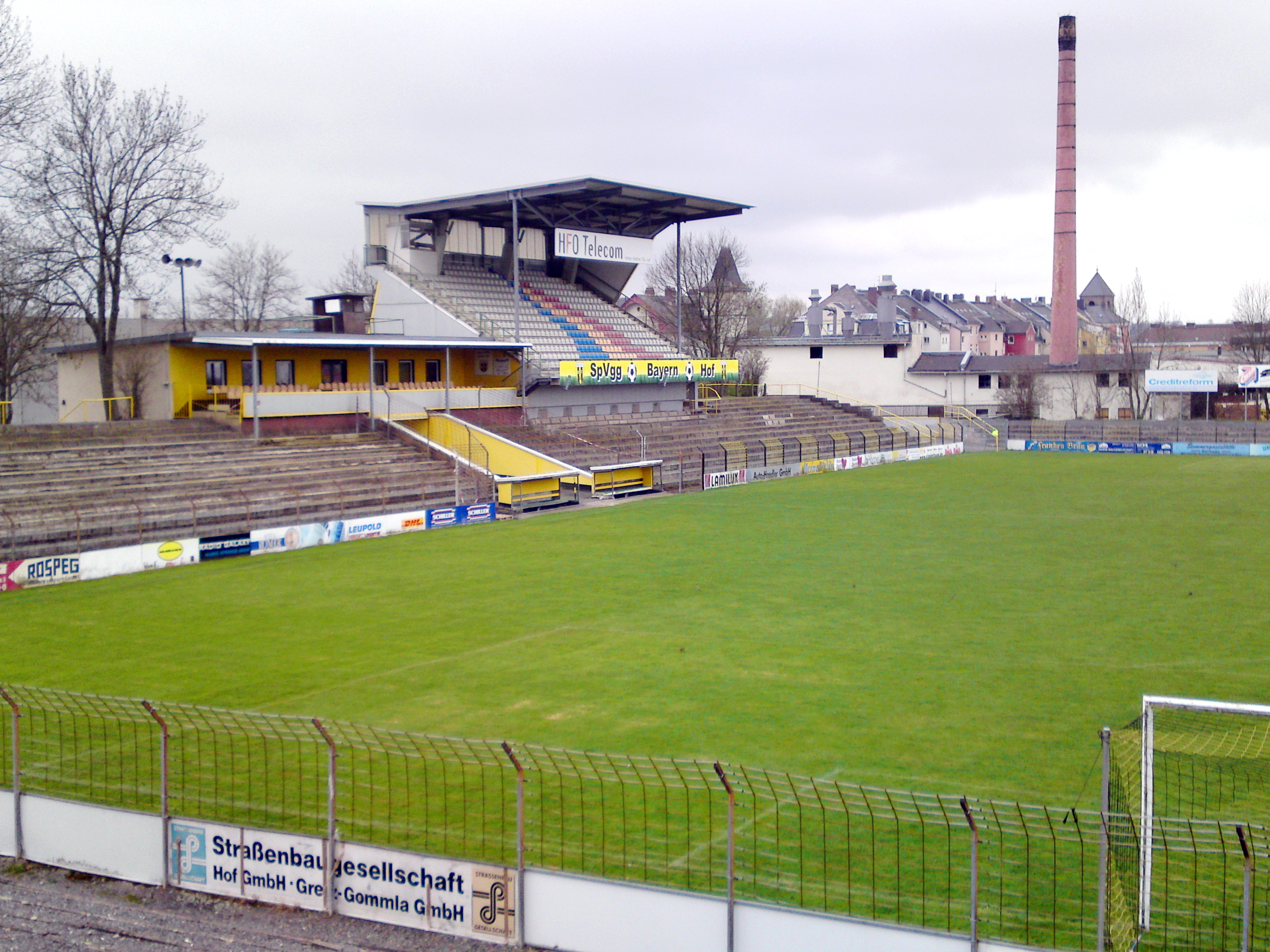
- Grüne Au in 2012
- Interactive map of Stadion Grüne Au
- Location: Hof, Germany
- Coordinates: 50.3148°N 11.9313°E
- Owner: City of Hof
- Capacity: 8,100 (2,135 seated)
- Surface: Grass
- Field size: 105 m × 68 m

Construction
- Built: 1913

Tenant
- SpVgg Bayern Hof

Stadion Grüne Au is a multi-use stadium in Hof, Germany. It is currently used mostly for football matches and is the home of Bayern Hof. The stadium has a capacity of 8,100 people. It opened in 1913. Attendance record is 19,100 during a Bundesliga promotion game against Rot-Weiss Essen in 1968.
