= Claude Iff =

Swiss footballer (born 1946)

Personal information
- Full name: Claude Iff
- Date of birth: 1946 (age 79–80)
- Position: Goalkeeper

Senior career*
Years	Team	Apps	(Gls)
1968–1969	FC Basel	1	(0)
- * Club domestic league appearances and goals

Claude Iff (born 1946) is a Swiss former footballer who played in the 1960s as goalkeeper.

Iff joined FC Basel's first team for their 1968–69 season under player-manager Helmut Benthaus. After playing in one test match, Iff played his domestic league debut for the club in the home game at the St. Jakob Stadium on 31 August 1968 as Basel against Grasshopper Club. In the 20th minute there was a five-minute interval for the nursing of goalkeeper Jean-Paul Laufenburger after a collision with Schneeberger, whereupon Basel's keeper had to be carried away with a concussion. Iff was substituted in and Basel were 0–1 down at this time. Iff kept a clean sheet and Basel managed a 1–1 draw.

In his one season with the first team, Iff played a total of five games for Basel. Only one of these games were in the Nationalliga A and the others were friendly games.

== Sources ==
- Die ersten 125 Jahre. Publisher: Josef Zindel im Friedrich Reinhardt Verlag, Basel. ISBN 978-3-7245-2305-5
- Verein "Basler Fussballarchiv" Homepage

(NB: Despite all efforts, the editors of these books and the authors in "Basler Fussballarchiv" have failed to be able to identify all the players, their date and place of birth or date and place of death, who played in the games during the early years of FC Basel)
