= 1970 Cup of the Alps =

1970 Coppa delle Alpi
Alpencup, Coupe des Alpes

Tournament details
- Country: Switzerland and Germany
- Teams: 8

Final positions
- Champions: FC Basel
- Runners-up: Fiorentina

Tournament statistics
- Matches played: 16
- Goals scored: 63 (3.94 per match)

1970 Coppa delle Alpi shows the results of the 1970 tournament that was held in Switzerland in the preseason 1970/71. The Coppa delle Alpi (translated as Cup of the Alps) was a football tournament, jointly organized by the Italian Football Federation and the Swiss Football Association as a pre-season event.

All of the games in the 1970 competition were played in Switzerland. There were four participants from Italy, these being Bari, Fiorentina, Lazio and Sampdoria, and there were four from Switzerland: Zürich, Lugano, Young Boys and FC Basel. Each Italian team played against each of the Swiss teams. The Italians and the Swiss each formed their own league table. The winners of each group then matched in the final.

== Matches ==
Round 1

6 June 1970
21:00

Basel (Switzerland)	4 – 1	(Italy) Bari
Paolucci 22'; Sundermann 33'; Rahmen 68'; Reisch 87'		53' Fara

St. Jakob Stadium, Basel
Attendance: 7,000
Referee: Kamber

6 June 1970

Lugano (Switzerland)	3 – 3	(Italy) Lazio
Luttrop 27'; Hansen 33'; Tippelt 70'		2' Facco; 21' Chinaglia; 79' Massa

Cornaredo Stadium, Lugano
Referee: (Italy) Michelotti

6 June 1970

Young Boys (Switzerland)	1 – 1	(Italy) Fiorentina
Müller 33'		30' Maraschi

Wankdorf Stadium, Bern
Referee: Barbaresco (Italia)

6 June 1970

Sampdoria (Italy)	3 – 2	(Switzerland) Zürich
Salvi; Francesconi 47', 55'		Hassler; Volkert 80'

Round 2

9 June 1970

Lazio (Italy)	2 – 0	(Switzerland) Young Boys
Ghio 5'; Chinaglia 12'

Wankdorf Stadium, Bern
Attendance: 3,000
Referee: (Switzerland) Schneuwly

9 June 1970

Basel (Switzerland)	2 – 1	(Italy) Sampdoria
Goal		Goal

9 June 1970
21:15

Zürich (Switzerland)	6 – 2	(Italy) Bari
Volkert 16'; Spimi 17'; Quentin 51'; Künzli 55', 65'; Martinelli 56'		27' Fara; 90' Cané

Letzigrund, Zürich
Referee: Acernese

9 June 1970

Lugano (Switzerland)	1 – 4	(Italy) Fiorentina
Tippelt 85'		25' Maraschi; 45' Esposito; 60', 89' Chiarugi

Cornaredo Stadium, Lugano
Referee: (Switzerland) Droz

Round 3

13 June 1970

Fiorentina (Italy)	3 – 3	(Switzerland) Basel
Mariani 61', 84'; Galdiolo 70'		71', 87' Hauser; 45' Mundschin

Letzigrund, Zürich
Referee: (Switzerland) Huber

13 June 1970

Young Boys (Switzerland)	1 – 2	(Italy) Bari
Müller 54'		23' Fara; 75' Cané

Wankdorf Stadium, Bern
Referee: Mota

13 June 1970

Lugano (Switzerland)	1 – 1	(Italy) Sampdoria
Goal		Goal

Cornaredo Stadium, Lugano

13 June 1970

Lazio (Italy)	3 – 0	(Switzerland) Zürich
Ghio 29'; Chinaglia 53', 89'

Letzigrund, Zürich
Attendance: 3,000
Referee: (Italy) Bucheli

Round 4

16 June 1970
21:30

Lugano (Switzerland)	2 – 0	(Italy) Bari
Gottardi 18', 25'

Cornaredo Stadium, Lugano
Referee: Galmann

16 June 1970

Young Boys (Switzerland)	4 – 0	(Italy) Sampdoria
Goal

16 June 1970

Basel (Switzerland)	3 – 2	(Italy) Lazio
Wenger 72', 73', 85'		71', 90' (pen.) Chinaglia

St. Jakob Stadium, Basel

16 June 1970

Zürich (Switzerland)	1 – 2	(Italy) Fiorentina
Volkert 90'		25' Merlo; 60' Maraschi

Letzigrund, Zürich
Referee: (Italy) Lattanzi

=== Final Table Italy ===
Pos	Team	Pld	W	D	L	GF	GA	Pts
1	Fiorentina	4	2	2	0	10	6	6
2	Lazio	4	2	1	1	10	6	5
3	Sampdoria	4	1	1	2	5	9	3
4	Bari	4	1	0	3	5	13	2

=== Final Table Switzerland ===
Pos	Team	Pld	W	D	L	GF	GA	Pts
1	Basel	4	3	1	0	12	7	7
2	Lugano	4	1	2	1	7	8	4
3	Young Boys	4	1	1	2	6	5	3
4	Zürich	4	1	0	3	9	10	2

== Final ==
19 June 1970

Basel (Switzerland)	3 – 2	(Italy) Fiorentina
Hauser 15'; Wenger 19', 76'		30' Longoni; 77' Esposito

St. Jakob Stadium Basel
Referee: (France) Vigliani

== Sources and References ==
- Cup of the Alps 1970 at RSSSF
