= Walter Mundschin =

Swiss footballer (born 1947)

Personal information
- Date of birth: 17 October 1947 (age 79)
- Place of birth: Sursee, Switzerland
- Height: 1.90 m (6 ft 3 in)
- Position: Libero

Youth career
- FC Basel

Senior career*
Years	Team	Apps	(Gls)
1965–1978	FC Basel		

International career
1972–1973	Switzerland	7	(1)
- * Club domestic league appearances and goals

Walter Mundschin (born 17 October 1947) is a Swiss former footballer who played as a libero.

== Club career ==
Born in Sursee, Mundschin played for FC Basel in the Nationalliga A during fourteen seasons between 1965 and 1978. He won the Swiss championship six times, the Swiss Cup twice and the first edition of the Swiss League Cup that was held in 1972. During this entire period he only had one coach, this being Helmut Benthaus.

The first time was in Basel's 1966–67 season. In that season Mundschin also won the double with Basel. In the Cup final in the former Wankdorf Stadium on 15 May 1967 Basel's opponents were Lausanne-Sports. Helmut Hauser scored the decisive goal via penalty. The game went down in football history due to the sit-down strike that followed that penalty goal. With the score at 1–1 after 88 minutes play, referee Karl Göppel awarded Basel a controversial penalty. André Grobéty had pushed Hauser gently in the back and Hauser let himself drop theatrically. After the 2–1 lead for Basel the Lausanne players subsequently refused to resume the game and they sat down demonstratively on the pitch. The referee was forced to abandon the match. Basel were awarded the cup with a 3–0 forfait.

During his time with Basel Mundschin played a total of 339 competitive games and scored 53 goals, including Championship, Cup and League Cup as well as European Cup, UEFA Cup and Fairs Cup.

== International career ==
Mundschin played seven games for the Swiss national football team and scored one goal. He played his debut for Switzerland, under coach Bruno Michaud, on 26 April 1972 in the friendly match against Sweden which ended in a 1–1 draw. He scored his goal for Switzerland in the home match in the Wankdorf Stadium against Scotland on 22 June 1973. It was the only goal of the game as the Swiss won 1–0.

Mundschin played his last game for his country on 26 September 1973 in Stadion Allmend, in front of 17,741 spectators, under coach René Hüssy. The 1974 FIFA World Cup qualification game for UEFA Group 2 ended with a 1–0 victory against Luxembourg.

== Honours ==
Basel

- Swiss League champions: 1966–67, 1968–69, 1969–70, 1971–72, 1972–73, 1976–77
- Swiss Cup winner: 1966–67, 1974–75
- Swiss Cup runner-up: 1969–70, 1971–72, 1972–73
- Swiss League Cup winner: 1972
- Coppa delle Alpi winner: 1969, 1970,
- Uhren Cup winner: 1969, 1970
