= Jürgen Sundermann =

German footballer and manager (1940–2022)

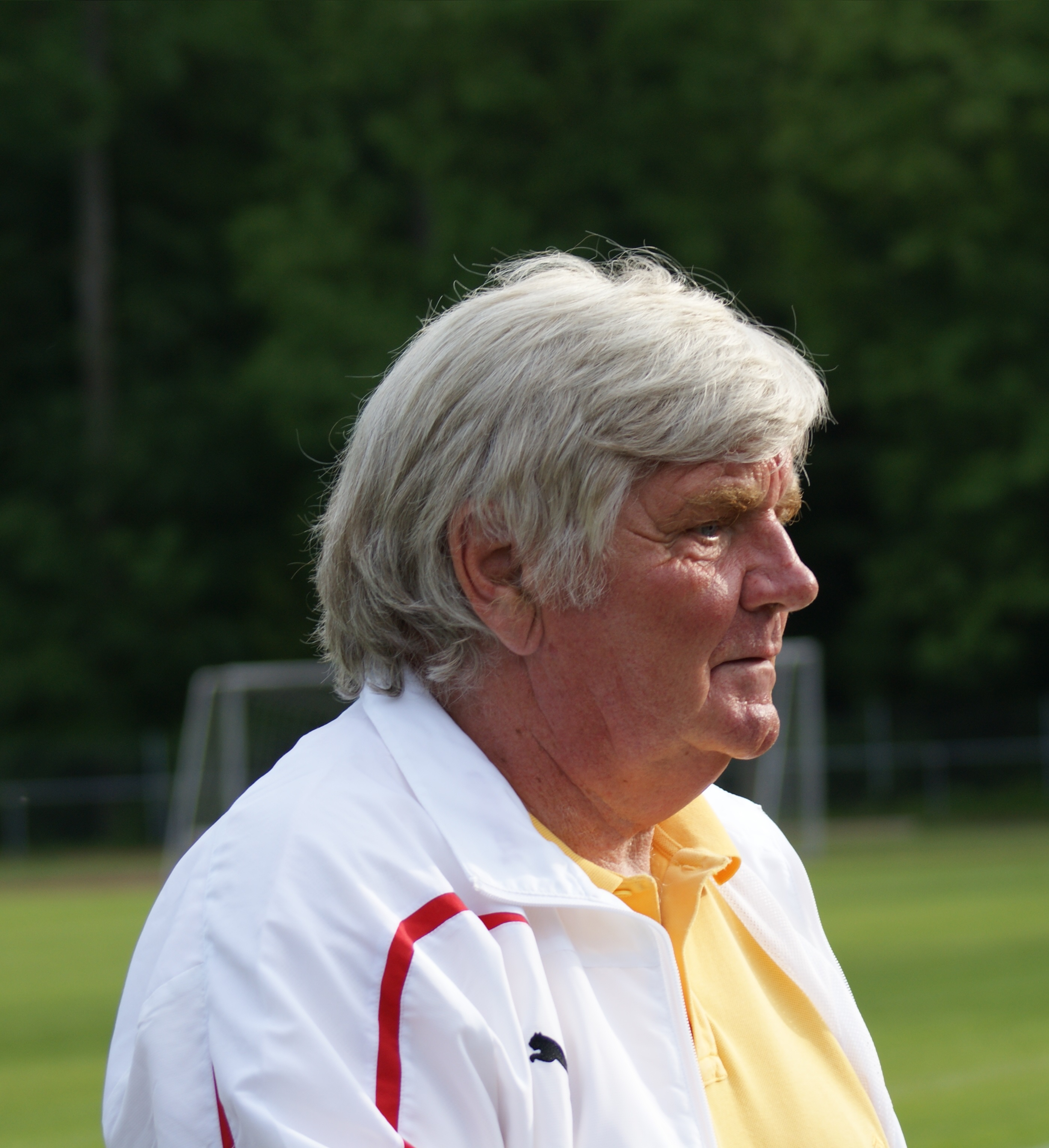
- Sundermann in 2012

Personal information
- Full name: Hans-Jürgen Sundermann
- Date of birth: 25 January 1940
- Place of birth: Mülheim, Rhine Province, Prussia, Germany
- Date of death: 4 October 2022 (aged 82)
- Place of death: Leonberg, Baden-Württemberg, Germany
- Position: Midfielder

Youth career
- 1949–1957: 1. FC Mülheim

Senior career*
Years	Team	Apps	(Gls)
1958–1962	Rot-Weiß Oberhausen	87	(2)
1962–1964	Viktoria Köln	64	(6)
1964–1966	Hertha BSC	55	(8)
1966–1968	Servette	43	(10)
1968–1972	FC Basel	90	(27)
1972–1975	Servette	82	(1)
Total		421	(54)

International career
1960	West Germany	1	(0)
1961–1962	West Germany U23	2	(0)

Managerial career
- 1972–1976: Servette
- 1976–1979: VfB Stuttgart
- 1979–1980: Grasshoppers
- 1980–1982: VfB Stuttgart
- 1982–1983: Stuttgarter Kickers
- 1983: Schalke 04
- 1983–1985: Strasbourg
- 1985–1986: Trabzonspor
- 1986–1988: Hertha BSC
- 1989: Malatyaspor
- 1989–1990: SpVgg Unterhaching
- 1991–1993: VfB Leipzig
- 1993–1994: Waldhof Mannheim
- 1994: VfB Leipzig
- 1994–1995: Sparta Prague
- 1995: VfB Stuttgart
- 1995–1996: Tennis Borussia Berlin
- 1997: CS Sfaxien
- 1999: Vorwärts Steyr
- * Club domestic league appearances and goals

Hans-Jürgen Sundermann (25 January 1940 – 4 October 2022) was a German football manager and player who played as a midfielder.

== Playing career ==
Sundermann played his youth football with local club 1. FC Mülheim. In 1958 he signed for Rot-Weiß Oberhausen, where he played for four years. He then moved on to Viktoria Köln. After two years with them he signed for Bundesliga side Hertha BSC and appeared in 29 league matches for them. Due to financial irregularities the club was relegated after that season. 1n 1965/66 Hertha won the Regionalliga Berlin but failed in the promotion play-off to the Bundesliga.

In 1966 Sundermann moved to Switzerland and signed for Servette, where he stayed for two seasons. Sundermann joined FC Basel's first team for their 1968–69 season under head coach Helmut Benthaus. Sundermann played his debut for his new club in the game in the Wankdorf Stadium in Bern on 15 June as Basel played a 1–1 draw against his former club Servette in the first round of the 1968 Cup of the Alps. Basel won their group and advanced to the final, but were defeated by Schalke after extra time. After playing in these six Cup of the Alps matches and five further test games, Sundermann played his domestic league debut for the club in the home game in the St. Jakob Stadium on 17 August. He scored his first goal for the club in the same game as Basel won 4–2 against Biel-Bienne. At the end of the season Sundermann won the Swiss Championship with the club.

In the 1969 Cup of the Alps Basel won their group and in the final they beat Bologna 3–1. Sundermann scored Basel's third goal in this final. At the end of the 1969–70 Nationalliga A season Sundermann won the Swiss Championship with the club for the second time. At the end of the 1970–71 Nationalliga A season Basel finished the Championship level on points with Grasshopper Club but were defeated in the play-off final 4–3 after extra time in front of 51,000 spectators in the Wankdorf Stadium in Bern.

Sundermann remained with Basel until the winter break of the 1971–72 Nationalliga A season. During the three and a half years with the club, Sundermann played a total of 175 games for Basel scoring a total of 44 goals. 90 of these games were in the Nationalliga A, 13 in the Swiss Cup, four in the European Cup, two in the UEFA Cup, another 23 in Cup of the Alps and Inter-Cities Fairs Cup and 43 were friendly games. He scored 27 goals in the domestic league, 3 in the domestic cup, 6 in the European games and the other eight were scored during the test games.

Following his time with Basel, Sundermann returned to his former club Servette, where he ended his active career in 1976.

Sundermann won one cap for the West Germany national team in March 1960.

== Coaching career ==
Among other accomplishments the coach won promotion to the Bundesliga with VfB Leipzig in the 1992–93 2. Bundesliga.

== Honours ==
FC Basel

- Swiss National League A Champion: 1968–69, 1969–70

== Sources ==
- Rotblau: Jahrbuch Saison 2017/2018. Publisher: FC Basel Marketing AG. ISBN 978-3-7245-2189-1
- Die ersten 125 Jahre. Publisher: Josef Zindel im Friedrich Reinhardt Verlag, Basel. ISBN 978-3-7245-2305-5
- Verein "Basler Fussballarchiv" Homepage
