= Georges Vuilleumier =

Swiss footballer (1944–1988)

Personal information
- Date of birth: 21 September 1944
- Place of birth: Tramelan, Switzerland
- Date of death: 29 July 1988 (aged 43)
- Position: Forward

Senior career*
| Years | Team | Apps | (Gls) |
| 1963–1966 | FC La Chaux-de-Fonds | | |
| 1966–1977 | Lausanne-Sport | | |
| 1977–1978 | FC Fribourg | | |
| 1978 | FC La Chaux-de-Fonds | | |

International career
| 1964–1973 | Switzerland | 19 | (2) |
- * Club domestic league appearances and goals

Georges Vuilleumier (21 September 1944 – 29 July 1988) was a Swiss footballer who played as a forward.

== Career ==
Born in Tramelan, Canton of Bern, Vuilleumier began his football career with FC La Chaux-de-Fonds where he won the Nationalliga A in 1964.

He played 19 times and scored 2 goals for Switzerland between 14 November 1964 and 18 November 1973. He was an unused substitute at the 1966 World Cup.
