= 1969 Cup of the Alps =

1969 Coppa delle Alpi
Alpencup, Coupe des Alpes

Tournament details
- Country: Switzerland and Germany
- Teams: 12

Final positions
- Champions: FC Basel
- Runners-up: Bologna

Tournament statistics
- Matches played: 31
- Goals scored: 82 (2.65 per match)
- Top goal scorer: Giuseppe Savoldi (6)

1969 Coppa delle Alpi shows the results of the 1969 tournament that was held in Switzerland in the preseason 1969/70. The Coppa delle Alpi (translated as Cup of the Alps) was a football tournament, first organized by the Italian national league to start the season 1960/61 and then they aided by the Swiss League after 1962. This competition ran from 1960 until 1987.

Most of the games in the 1969 competition were played in Switzerland, three were played in Hof, one in Rüsselsheim. The teams taking part were Lausanne Sports, Zürich, Basel and Biel-Bienne. From Belgium K.S.V. Waregem were qualified and from Italy were Bologna, Hellas Verona, Sampdoria and Napoli. Qualified from Germany were Alemannia Aachen, Eintracht Frankfurt and Bayern Hof. Two teams from each country were divided into each of the two groups. Teams did not play compatriots; Waregem did not play Eintracht.

== Group A ==
=== Matches ===
Round 1

14 June 1969

Lausanne Sports (Switzerland)	1 – 2	(Italy) Bologna
Vavassori (o.g.)		Savoldi

Olympique de la Pontaise, Lausanne
Attendance: 4,500

14 June 1969

Zürich (Switzerland)	0 – 2	(Germany) Alemannia Aachen
		(pen.) Hoffmann; Tennbruck

Letzigrund, Zürich
Attendance: 4,500

14 June 1969
17:00

Bayern Hof (Germany)	0 – 0	(Italy) Hellas Verona

Stadion Grüne Au, Hof
Attendance: 5,500
Referee: (Netherlands) Geluck

Round 2

17 June 1969

Zürich (Switzerland)	0 – 3	(Italy) Bologna
		Savoldi; Scala

Letzigrund, Zürich
Attendance: 4,500

17 June 1969
17:00

Bayern Hof (Germany)	2 – 1	(Switzerland) Lausanne Sports
Reiber; Greim (pen.)		Zappella

Stadion Grüne Au, Hof

17 June 1969

Alemannia Aachen (Germany)	3 – 1	(Italy) Hellas Verona
Walter; Krott; Hoffmann (pen.)		Bui

Attendance: 7,000

Round 3

21 June 1969

Lausanne Sports (Switzerland)	4 – 1	(Germany) Alemannia Aachen
Hosp; Chapuisat		Krott

Olympique de la Pontaise, Lausanne
Attendance: 1,500

21 June 1969

Zürich (Switzerland)	2 – 1	(Italy) Hellas Verona
Meyer; Pellegrini		Sega

Letzigrund, Zürich
Attendance: 3,900

21 June 1969
17:00

Bayern Hof (Germany)	1 – 1	(Italy) Bologna
Schonauer		Savoldi

Stadion Grüne Au, Hof
Attendance: 11,000
Referee: (Belgium) Delecourt

Round 4

25 June 1969

Lausanne Sports (Switzerland)	2 – 1	(Italy) Hellas Verona
Hosp; Chapuisat		Bonfanti

Olympique de la Pontaise, Lausanne
Attendance: 1,000

25 June 1969

Zürich (Switzerland)	3 – 2	(Germany) Bayern Hof
P.Stierli; Kunzil; Quentin		Greim; Breuer

Letzigrund, Zürich
Attendance: 600

25 June 1969

Alemannia Aachen (Germany)	1 – 1	(Italy) Bologna
Hoffmann (pen.)		Savoldi

Attendance: 7,000

=== Table ===
Pos	Team	Pld	W	D	L	GF	GA	Pts
1	Bologna	4	2	2	0	7	3	6
2	Alemannia Aachen	4	2	1	1	7	6	4
3	Lausanne Sports	4	2	0	2	8	6	4
4	Bayern Hof	4	1	2	1	5	5	4
5	Zürich	4	2	0	2	5	8	4
5	Hellas Verona	4	0	1	3	3	7	1

== Group B ==
=== Matches ===
Round 1

14 June 1969

Basel (Switzerland)	4 – 1	(Italy) Sampdoria
Hauser; Benthaus; Sundermann; Odermatt		Frustaluppi

St. Jakob Stadium Basel
Attendance: 6,500

14 June 1969

Biel-Bienne (Switzerland)	1 – 3	(Germany) Eintracht Frankfurt
Peters		Lutz; Grabowski; Nickel

Gurzelen Stadion Biel/Bienne
Attendance: 4,500

14 June 1969

K.S.V. Waregem (Belgium)	2 – 2	(Italy) Napoli
Van Horenbeke		Canzion; Nielsen

Attendance: 5,000

Round 2

17 June 1969

Basel (Switzerland)	3 – 0	(Belgium) K.S.V. Waregem
Sundermann; Hauser

St. Jakob Stadium Basel
Attendance: 4,500

17 June 1969

Biel-Bienne (Switzerland)	1 – 1	(Italy) Sampdoria
Knuchel		Frustaluppi

Gurzelen Stadion Biel/Bienne
Attendance: 3,600

17 June 1969

Eintracht Frankfurt (Germany)	2 – 1	(Italy) Napoli
Nickel; Kraus		Barison

Attendance: 11,500

Round 3

21 June 1969

Basel (Switzerland)	3 – 2	(Germany) Eintracht Frankfurt
Hauser; Benthaus; Balmer		Hölzenbein

St. Jakob Stadium Basel
Attendance: 9,500

21 June 1969

Biel-Bienne (Switzerland)	0 – 2	(Italy) Napoli
		Sportiello; Barison

Gurzelen Stadion Biel/Bienne
Attendance: 7,300

21 June 1969

K.S.V. Waregem (Belgium)	5 – 1	(Italy) Sampdoria
Lambert; Paulicek; Lammens		Corni

Attendance: 5,000

Round 4

25 June 1969

Basel (Switzerland)	2 – 3	(Italy) Napoli
Odermatt; Wenger		Barison; Montefusco; Salvi

St. Jakob Stadium Basel
Attendance: 10,500

25 June 1969

Eintracht Frankfurt (Germany)	0 – 4	(Italy) Sampdoria
		Salvi

Stadion am Sommerdamm, Rüsselsheim
Attendance: 2,500

25 June 1969

Biel-Bienne (Switzerland)	2 – 2	(Belgium) K.S.V. Waregem
Knuchel (pen.); Peters		Bettens; Paulicek

Gurzelen Stadion Biel/Bienne
Attendance: 1,000

=== Table ===
Pos	Team	Pld	W	D	L	GF	GA	Pts
1	Basel	4	3	0	1	12	6	6
2	Napoli	4	2	1	1	8	6	5
3	K.S.V. Waregem	4	1	2	1	9	8	4
4	Eintracht Frankfurt	4	2	0	2	7	9	4
5	Sampdoria	4	1	1	2	7	10	3
6	Biel-Bienne	4	0	2	2	4	8	2

== Final ==
27 June 1969

Basel (Switzerland)	3 – 1	(Italy) Bologna
Hauser 16'; Kiefer 21'; Sundermann 28'		50' Ciacci

St. Jakob Stadium Basel
Attendance: 21,000

== Sources and References ==
- Cup of the Alps 1969 at RSSSF
