= Helmut Hauser =

German footballer

Personal information
- Full name: Helmut Hauser
- Date of birth: 7 March 1941 (age 85)
- Place of birth: Schopfheim
- Position: Forward

Youth career
- SV Schopfheim

Senior career*
Years	Team	Apps	(Gls)
until 1964	SV Schopfheim		
1964–1972	Basel	146	(70)
1972–1977	Aarau	122	(17)
- * Club domestic league appearances and goals

Helmut Hauser (born 7 March 1941) is a German former footballer. He played as forward.

Hauser started his youth football with local club SV Schopfheim. He also played a few years in their senior team. In 1964 he transferred to Basel and played there for eight years, the first under trainer Georges Sobotka and seven under trainer Helmut Benthaus. He won the Swiss Championship four times and was Swiss Cup winner once. In the eight seasons in which Hauser played for Basel, he played a total of 287 games for the club scoring a total of 180 goals. 146 of these games were in the Nationalliga A, 27 games were in the domestic cup, 42 were in European competitions and 82 games were test games. 70 of the goals were in the domestic league, 17 were in the cup, 20 were in European competitions (European Cup, Cup of the Alps and Inter-Cities Fairs Cup) and the other 73 were in the tests.

Hauser won his first championship title in Basel's 1966–67 season. Basel finished the championship one point clear of FC Zürich who finished in second position. Basel won 16 of the 26 games, drawing eight, losing twice, and they scored 60 goals conceding just 20. Roberto Frigerio was the team's top goal scorer with 16 league goals and Hauser second best goal scorer with 14 league goals in 18 appearances.

In that season Hauser won the double with Basel. In the Cup final on 15 May 1967 Basel's opponents were Lausanne-Sports. In the former Wankdorf Stadium, Hauser scored the decisive goal via penalty. The game went down in football history due to the sit-down strike that followed this goal. After 88 minutes of play, with the score at 1–1, referee Karl Göppel awarded Basel a controversial penalty. André Grobéty had pushed Hauser gently in the back and he let himself drop theatrically. Subsequent to the 2–1 for Basel the Lausanne players refused to resume the game and they sat down demonstratively on the pitch. The referee had to abandon the match. Basel were awarded the cup with a 3–0 forfait.

His second title was won in Basel's 1968–69 season. The team finished the season one point clear of second placed Lausanne Sports. Basel won 13 of their 26 games, drawing ten, losing three times, they scored 48 goals conceding 28. Hauser played 19 domestic league games, he scored 10 league goals and was the team's best goalscorer.

Hauser won the championship with Basel for the third time at the end of the season 1969–70. The team again finished one point clear of Lausanne Sports who ended the season in second position again. Basel won 15 of the 26 games, drawing seven, losing four times, they scored 59 and conceded 23 goals. Hauser played 24 domestic league games, he scored 14 league goals and again was the team's best goalscorer. His fourth title was won in Basel's 1971–72 season.

After his time at Basel Hauser moved on to Aarau. He played five seasons for Aarau in the Nationalliga B the second highest tier of Swiss football.

== Honours ==
- Swiss League: 1966–67, 1968–69, 1969–70, 1971–72
- Swiss Cup: 1966–67
- Cup of the Alps winner: 1969, 1970
- Uhren Cup winner: 1969, 1970
