= Walter Balmer (footballer) =

Swiss footballer

Personal information
- Full name: Walter Balmer
- Date of birth: 28 March 1948
- Place of birth: Thun, Switzerland
- Date of death: 27 December 2010 (aged 62)
- Place of death: Interlaken, Switzerland
- Position: Forward

Youth career
- until 1964: FC Thun

Senior career*
Years	Team	Apps	(Gls)
1964–1968	FC Thun	74	(32)
1969–1976	FC Basel	156	(65)

International career
1969–1973	Switzerland	20	(2)
- * Club domestic league appearances and goals

Walter Balmer (28 March 1948 – 27 December 2010) was a Swiss international footballer. After his football career he became a high school teacher.

== Career ==
=== Club ===
Born in Thun, Balmer and started and played his youth football with the local club FC Thun. He advanced to their first team, who played in the Nationalliga B, the second tier of Swiss football in 1964 and played with them as a right winger between 1964 and 1968. He was the team’s top goal scorer in the 1966–67 season and was joint fifth highest scorer in the league.

Balmer was discovered by FC Basel head coach Helmut Benthaus in November 1968 in an FCB cup match against second tier club FC Thun. The then 20-year-old offensive player Balmer was the scorer of the equaliser just before half time and was by far the most noticeable player despite the Bernese Oberlanders' 2-1 defeat. Promptly Benthaus offered him a contract and in the winter break he signed for Basel.

After playing in four test games Balmer played his debut with his new team in the Swiss Cup away game in the Charmilles Stadium in Geneva on 22 February 1969, but Basel were defeated 1–0 by Servette. He played his domestic league debut for the club in the away game in the Gurzelen Stadion one week later on 2 March as Basel played a 1–1 with Biel-Bienne. He scored his first league goal for his new club on 12 April in the home game in the St. Jakob Stadium as Basel won 2–1 against Servette. At the end of the 1968–69 league season Basel won the Swiss championship.

Balmer played six and a half years for Basel, between 1969 and 1976 in the Nationalliga A and won three further league titles in the seasons 1969-70, 1971-72 and 1972-73.

Balmer also won the first edition of the Swiss League Cup in 1972 with the team. In the 1975 Swiss Cup final against Winterthur, Balmer scored the winning goal five minutes before the end of overtime.

Balmer played a total of 306 games for Basel scoring a total of 150 goals. 156 of these games were in the Swiss Super League, 41 in the Swiss Cup and Swiss League Cup, 38 in the UEFA competitions (European Cup, UEFA Cup, Cup of the Alps and Uhrencup) and 71 were friendly games. He scored 65 goals in the domestic league, 19 in the domestic cups, 15 in the European games and the other 51 were scored during the test games.

=== International ===
Between the years 1969 and 1973 Balmer played 20 games for the Swiss national team in which he scored two goals. In 1971, he scored during the 4–0 win against Turkey and in 1972 during the 1–1 draw with Denmark.

== Private life ==
Collateral to his semi-professional football career with FCB, Balmer completed his studies at the University of Basel. The successful completion of his studium was the reason why Balmer ended his career as a top footballer when he was not even 27 years old. He received an offer from the Interlaken high school, which he understandably did not want to refuse, especially since in that era the secure position of a high school teacher was a more stable economic basis than the life of as a semi-professional football in a Swiss NLA club. Balmer taught mathematics and sports as a respected teacher at Interlaken High School until his sudden and much too early death. He had also worked as a sport journalist. He died of heart failure while cross-country skiing on 27 December 2010.

== Honours ==
Basel

- Swiss League champion: 1968–69, 1969-70, 1971-72, 1972-73
- Swiss Cup winner: 1972-75
- Swiss League Cup winner: 1972
- Cup of the Alps winner: 1969, 1970
- Uhrencup winner: 1969, 1970

== Sources ==
- Josef Zindel (2018). FC Basel 1893. Die ersten 125 Jahre (in German). Basel: Friedrich Reinhardt Verlag. ISBN 978-3-7245-2305-5.
- Verein "Basler Fussballarchiv" Homepage
