= Cup of the Alps =

Cup of the Alps (Coppa delle Alpi )
- Founded: 1960
- Abolished: 1987; 39 years ago
- Region: Western Europe (Switzerland, Italy, France, Monaco and Germany)
- Teams: 16 (1960–1961); 8 (1962–1968); 12 (1968–1969); 8 (1970–1981); 10 (1982); 8 (1983–1987)
- Last champions: AJ Auxerre (2nd title)
- Most championships: Servette FC (4 titles)

Coppa delle Alpi (translated as Cup of the Alps) was an official football tournament, first organized by the Italian national league in 1960, aided by the Swiss League from 1962, running from 1960 until 1987.

In the 1960s and 1961 editions ranking was compiled by adding the points of the Italian and Swiss teams. The tournament was won by the Italian federation in both editions, and the teams that represented it was given a cup of reduced dimensions (A.S. Roma, Catania Calcio, Hellas Verona F.C., Catanzaro Calcio, Triestina, U.S. Città di Palermo, Napoli Calcio and Alessandria Calcio in the 1960 and S.S. Lazio, Fiorentina, A.C. Monza Brianza 1912, Pro Patria Calcio, A.C. Reggiana 1919, Parma F.C., Lecco Calcio and Brescia Calcio in the 1961).

== Years ==
- 1960–61: competition between league selections and Italian and Swiss teams.
- 1962–66: competition between (Italy) Italian and (Switzerland) Swiss teams.
- 1967–68: competition between (Germany) German, (Italy) Italian and (Switzerland) Swiss teams.
- 1969–71: competition between (Italy) Italian and (Switzerland) Swiss teams.
- 1972–87: competition between (France) French and (Switzerland) Swiss teams.

== List of finals ==
Keys

- aet: won after extra time
- p: won after penalty shoot-out

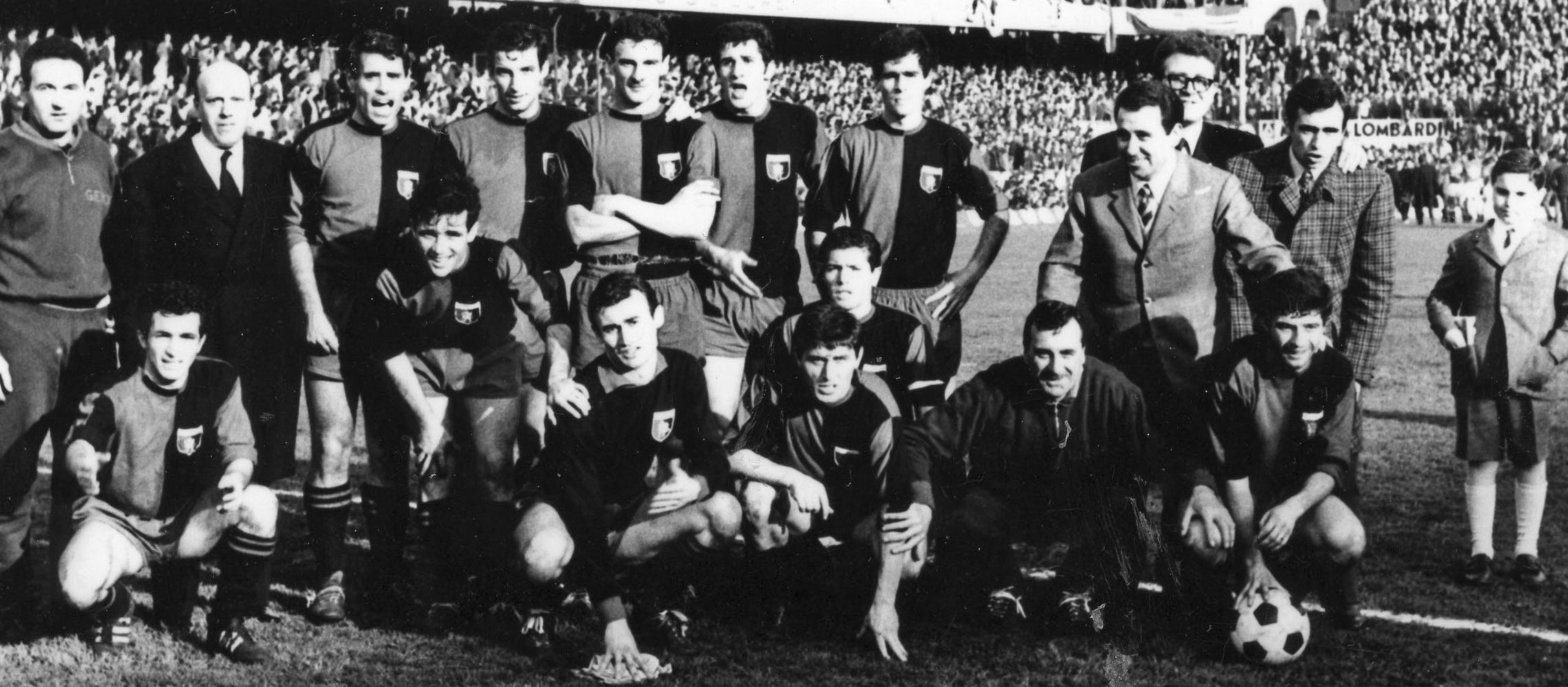
Genoa celebrates the triumph in the 1962 edition

Ed.	Year	Champion	Score	Runner-up	Final host	Ref.
1	1960	(Italy) Serie A selection (Note: Selection consisting of player from teams as Alessandria, Catania, Catanzaro, Hellas Verona, Napoli, Palermo, Roma and Triestina.)	– (Note: Round-robin tournament.)	(Switzerland) Swiss League selection	–	
2	1961	(Italy) Serie A selection (Note: Selection consisting of player from teams as Brescia, Fiorentina, Lazio, Lecco, Monza, Parma, Pro Patria and Reggiana.)	–	(Switzerland) Swiss League selection	–	
3	1962	(Italy) Genoa	1–0	(France) Grenoble 1892	Genoa	
4	1963	(Italy) Juventus	3–2	(Italy) Atalanta	Genève	
5	1964	(Italy) Genoa	2–0	(Italy) Catania	Bern	
–	1965	(not held)				
6	1966	(Italy) Napoli	–	(Italy) Juventus	–	
7	1967	(Germany) Eintracht Frankfurt	–	(Germany) TSV 1860	–	
8	1968	(Germany) Schalke 04	3–1 (a.e.t.)	(Switzerland) Basel	Basel	
9	1969	(Switzerland) Basel	3–1	(Italy) Bologna	Basel	
8	1970	(Switzerland) Basel	3–2	(Italy) Fiorentina	Basel	
9	1971	(Italy) Lazio	3–1	(Switzerland) Basel	Basel	
10	1972	(France) Nîmes Olympique	7–2	(France) Bordeaux	Nîmes	
11	1973	(Switzerland) Servette	1–0	(Switzerland) Lausanne	Genève	
12	1974	(Switzerland) Young Boys	2–1	(Switzerland) Basel	Basel	
13	1975	(Switzerland) Servette	3–0	(Switzerland) Basel	Genève	
14	1976	(Switzerland) Servette	2–1	(France) Nîmes Olympique	Genève	
15	1977	(France) Stade Reims	3–1	(France) Bastia	Reims	
16	1978	(Switzerland) Servette	4–0	(Switzerland) Lausanne	Genève	
17	1979	AS Monaco	3–1	(France) Metz	Metz	
18	1980	(France) Bordeaux	3–0	(France) Nîmes Olympique	Bordeaux	
19	1981	(Switzerland) Basel	2–2 (5–4 p)	(France) Sochaux-Montbéliard	Basel	
20	1982	(France) Nantes Atlantique	1–0	(Switzerland) Neuchâtel Xamax	Neuchâtel	
21	1983	AS Monaco	2–1	(France) Auxerre	Monaco	
22	1984	AS Monaco	2–0	(Switzerland) Grasshopper	Zürich	
23	1985	(France) Auxerre	1–0	AS Monaco	Auxerre	
–	1986	(not held)				
24	1987	(France) Auxerre	3–1	(Switzerland) Grasshopper	Auxerre	

== Performance ==
=== By club ===
Club	Winners	Runners-up	Winning years	Runner-up years
(Switzerland) Servette	4	-	1973, 1975, 1976, 1978	–
(Switzerland) Basel	3	4	1969, 1970, 1981	1968, 1971, 1974, 1975
AS Monaco	3	1	1979, 1983, 1984	1985
(France) Auxerre	2	1	1985, 1987	1983
(Italy) Genoa	2	-	1962, 1964	–
(France) Nîmes	1	2	1972	1976, 1980
(Italy) Juventus	1	1	1963	1966
(France) Bordeaux	1	1	1980	1972
(Italy) Napoli	1	-	1966	–
(Germany) Eintracht Frankfurt	1	-	1967	–
(Germany) Schalke 04	1	-	1968	–
(Italy) Lazio	1	-	1971	–
(Switzerland) Young Boys	1	-	1974	–
(France) Stade Reims	1	-	1977	–
(France) Nantes	1	-	1982	–
(Switzerland) Lausanne Sports	-	2	–	1973, 1978
(Switzerland) Grasshoppers	-	2	–	1984, 1987
(France) Grenoble	-	1	–	1962
(Italy) Atalanta	-	1	–	1963
(Italy) Catania	-	1	–	1964
(Germany) 1860 Munich	-	1	–	1967
(Italy) Bologna	-	1	–	1969
(Italy) Fiorentina	-	1	–	1970
(France) Bastia	-	1	–	1977
(France) Metz	-	1	–	1979
(France) Sochaux	-	1	–	1981
(Switzerland) Neuchâtel Xamax	-	1	–	1982

A victory as a member of the Italian selection: A.S. Roma, Catania Calcio, Hellas Verona F.C., Catanzaro Calcio, Triestina, U.S. Città di Palermo, Napoli Calcio, Alessandria Calcio, S.S. Lazio, Fiorentina, A.C. Monza Brianza 1912, Pro Patria Calcio, A.C. Reggiana 1919, Parma F.C., Lecco Calcio Brescia Calcio.

=== By nation ===
Nation	Winners	Runners-up
Switzerland	8	11
Italy	7	5
France	6	8
Monaco	3	1
Germany	2	1

== Cup of the Alps for amateurs ==
In 1998 the competition was restarted (using the same name) but with amateur teams from Italy, Switzerland, France (and Belgium in 2004 and 2005). Each year in Geneva there is an unofficial tournament with 8 teams each with 15 amateurs played for the first place.

=== Dates ===
- 1998: competition restart with amateur clubs between (Italy) Italian, (France) French and (Switzerland) Swiss teams.
- 2004-05: a team from Belgium joined the competition.

== Sources and References ==
- Cup of the Alps at Rec.Sport.Soccer Statistics Foundation.
