= 1972–73 Swiss Cup =

Tournament details
- Country: Switzerland

Final positions
- Champions: Zürich
- Runners-up: Basel

The 1972–73 Swiss Cup was the 48th season of Switzerland's football cup competition, organised annually since 1925–26 by the Swiss Football Association.

== Overview ==
This season's cup competition began on the weekend of 2 and 3 September 1972, with the first games of the first round. The competition was to be completed on Easter Monday 23 April 1973 with the final, which was held at the former Wankdorf Stadium in Bern. The clubs from this season's Nationalliga B (NLB) entered the competition in the third round. The clubs from this season's Nationalliga A (NLA) were granted byes for the first three rounds. These teams joined the competition in the fourth round, which was played on the week-end of 4 and 5 November.

The matches were played in a knockout format. In the event of a draw after 90 minutes, the match went into extra time. In the event of a draw at the end of extra time, a replay was foreseen and this was played on the visiting team's pitch. If the replay ended in a draw after extra time, a toss of a coin would decide the outcome of the match. For the first time, the quarter- and semi-finals were played as two legged fixtures. This was going to be a test, that would last for three years. The final was again played in one single match. The cup-winners qualified themselves for the first round of the Cup Winners' Cup in the next season.

== Round 1 ==
In this first phase, the lower league teams (1. Liga and lower) that had qualified themselves for the competition through their regional football association's cup competitions or the association's requirements, competed here. Whenever possible, the draw respected local regionalities. The lower-tier team in each drawn tie was granted the home advantage.

=== Summary ===
Team 1	Score	Team 2
2 and 3 September 1972
FC Fétigny	0–1	Yverdon-Sport
Stade Nyonnais	1–3	FC Renens
Minerva Bern	2–1	FC Deitingen
Zähringia Bern	0–4	Bern
Thun	2–1	Köniz
FC Raron	3–1	FC Assens
Wohlen	0–3	Emmenbrücke
FC Bischofszell	4–1	FC Tössfeld (Winterthur)
FC Uzwil	4–4 (a.e.t.)	Schaffhausen
FC Beringen	0–2	FC Wil
Gossau	3–1	FC Oberwinterthur
FC Stäfa ZH	1–0	FC Dietikon
Baden	1–1 (a.e.t.)	FC Glattbrugg
ASI Audax-Friul NE	3–4	FC Beauregard Fribourg
Central Fribourg	5–2	FC Courtepin
FC Glarus	2–1	Uster
Vaduz	2–3	FC Landquart
FC Crissier	1–1 (a.e.t.)	FC Vernier
Meyrin	1–2	Urania Genève Sport
Laufen	6–2 (a.e.t.)	FC Breite Basel
FC Porrentruy	2–1	Moutier
SC Derendingen	1–0	FC Aurore Bienne
FC Aesch	1–3	FC Langenthal
Concordia	2–3	SC Kleinhüningen
Nordstern	2–3 (a.e.t.)	FC Olten
FC Bettlach	4–0	FC Bözingen 34
Delémont	2–1	FC Trimbach
Solothurn	3–1	SV Lyss
FC Le Locle	1–2	Dürrenast
Frauenfeld	3–0	FC Rheineck
Brugg	1–6	Chur
FC Orbe	0–1	FC Fontainemelon
FC Couvet	0–1	FC Sainte-Croix
FC Obergeissenstein LU	2–0	FC Perlen
Kriens	5–0	US Giubiasco
FC Turgi	3–3 (a.e.t.)	FC Dübendorf
Ibach	1–2	SC Zug
Locarno	5–0	Losone Sportiva
AS Gambarogno	0–0 (a.e.t.)	FC Rapid Lugano
Armonia Lugano	2–1 (a.e.t.)	FC Bodio
Red Star	1–1 (a.e.t.)	FC Albisrieden ZH
Blue Stars	3–0	FC Adliswil
FC Vernayaz	1–0	FC Sierre
Star Sécheron	0–1	Monthey

Replays

Team 1	Score	Team 2
6 September 1972
Schaffhausen	3–4	FC Uzwil
FC Glattbrugg	0–3	Baden
FC Vernier	2–0	FC Crissier
FC Dübendorf	1–1 (a.e.t.) *	FC Turgi
FC Rapid Lugano	0–2	AS Gambarogno
FC Albisrieden ZH	2–0	Red Star

- FC Turgi qualified on toss of a coin

== Round 2 ==
=== Summary ===
Team 1	Score	Team 2
16 and 17 September 1972
Yverdon-Sport	3–0	FC Renens
Minerva Bern	1–5	Bern
Thun	3–2 (a.e.t.)	FC Raron
AS Gambarogno	0–0 (a.e.t.)	Emmenbrücke
Bischofszell	0–2	FC Uzwil
FC Wil	1–4 (a.e.t.)	Gossau
FC Stäfa ZH	1–2	Baden
FC Beauregard Fribourg	1–4	Central Fribourg
FC Glarus	3–2 (a.e.t.)	FC Landquart
FC Vernier	2–1 (a.e.t.)	Urania Genève Sport
Laufen	2–1	FC Porrentruy
SC Derendingen	4–0	FC Langenthal
SC Kleinhüningen	2–2 (a.e.t.)	FC Olten
Bettlach	1–1	Delémont
Delémont	2–1 (a.e.t.)	Bettlach
Solothurn	3–2	Dürrenast
Frauenfeld	0–1	Chur
FC Fontainemelon	7–1	FC Sainte-Croix
FC Obergeissenstein	1–3	Kriens
FC Turgi	3–2 (a.e.t.)	SC Zug
Locarno	4–0	Armonia Lugano
FC Albisrieden ZH	1–2	Blue Stars
FC Vernayaz	0–0	Monthey

Replays

Team 1	Score	Team 2
21 September 1972
Monthey	1–2	FC Vernayaz
24 September 1972
FC Olten	5–3	SC Kleinhüningen
26 September 1972
Delémont	2–1 (a.e.t.)	Bettlach
1 October 1972
Emmenbrücke	2–3	AS Gambarogno

== Round 3 ==
The teams from the NLB entered the cup competition in this round. However, they were seeded and could not be drawn against each other. Whenever possible, the draw respected local regionalities. The lower-tier team in each drawn tie was granted the home advantage.

=== Summary ===
Team 1	Score	Team 2
7 October 1972
Chênois	3–1	Yverdon-Sport
US Gambarogno	1–4	Aarau
Brühl	2–1	FC Wil
Bellinzona	1–0	Baden
Xamax	2–0	Central Fribourg
Luzern	18–1	FC Glarus
Etoile Carouge	5–2	FC Vernier
Biel-Bienne	2–1	Solothurn
Young Fellows	3–0	Chur
Vevey Sports	3–0	FC Fontainemelon
Mendrisiostar	3–1	FC Turgi
8 October 1972
FC Vernayaz	1–4	Martigny-Sports
Laufen	1–2	SC Derendingen
Locarno	0–1	Blue Stars
FC Olten	0–2	Delémont
FC Uzwil	2–1	Buochs
Bern	2–0	Thun

=== Matches ===
7 October 1972

US Gambarogno	1–4	Aarau
Goal	summary	Goal

Stadion Brügglifeld, Aarau

== Round 4 ==
The teams from the NLA entered the cup competition in the fourth round, they were seeded and could not be drawn against each other. The draw was still respecting regionalities and the lower-tier team was again granted the home advantage.

=== Summary ===
Team 1	Score	Team 2
4 and 5 November 1972
Sion	2–0	Chênois
Bern	0–6	Servette
Aarau	0–2 (a.e.t.)	Winterthur
FC Uzwil	2–1	Brühl
Bellinzona	1–4	Zürich
Xamax	0–2	Lausanne-Sport
Lugano	2–4	Luzern
Etoile Carouge	4–0	La Chaux-de-Fonds
SC Derendingen	1–4	Fribourg
Delémont	0–2	Biel-Bienne
Grasshopper Club	4–1	Young Fellows
Vevey Sports	5–1	Grenchen
Chiasso	3–0	Kriens
St. Gallen	0–1	Wettingen
Young Boys	3–0	Blue Stars
Basel	6–0	Martigny-Sports

=== Matches ===
5 November 1972

Bern	0–6	Servette
	Servette summary	(0:1) Wegmann (0:2) Németh (0:3) Pfister (0:4) Pfister (0:5) Barriquand (0:6) Castella

Stadion Neufeld, Bern

5 November 1972

Aarau	0–2 (a.e.t.)	Winterthur
	FCA summary	(0:1) (0:2)

Stadion Brügglifeld, Aarau

5 November 1972

Bellinzona	1–4	Zürich
Gobbi 74' (1:3)	FCZ summary	16' (0:1) Marti; 48' (0:2) Marti; 67' (0:3) Stierli; 75' (1:4) Künzli

Letzigrund, Zürich
Referee: (Switzerland)

5 November 1972

Young Boys	3–0	Blue Stars
(1:0) (2:0) (3:0)	YB summary

Wankdorf Stadium, Bern

5 November 1972
14:30

Basel	6–0	Martigny-Sports
Riner 18' (1:0); Balmer 49' (2:0); Hitzfeld 77' (pen. 3:0); Riner 81' (4:0); Balmer 83' (5:0); Riner 87' (6:0)	FCB summary

St. Jakob Stadium, Basel
Attendance: 5,000
Referee: (Switzerland) Ernest Guignet (Yverdon)

== Round 5 ==
=== Summary ===
Team 1	Score	Team 2
25 and 26 November 1972'
Sion	2–1	Servette
FC Uzwil	0–2	Winterthur
Zürich	2–1	Lausanne-Sport
Fribourg	1–2	Biel-Bienne
Grasshopper Club	5–1	Vevey Sports
Chiasso	4–0	Wettingen
Young Boys	0–4	Basel
Etoile Carouge	0–0	Luzern

Replay

Team 1	Score	Team 2
29 November 1972
Luzern	0–2	Etoile Carouge

=== Matches ===
25 November 1972

Sion	2–1	Servette
Goal	Servette summary	Blanchoud

Stade de Tourbillon, Sion

25 November 1972

Zürich	2–1	Lausanne-Sport
Jeandupeux 19' (1:0); Künzli 60' (2:0)	FCZ summary	Walter Müller II

Letzigrund, Zürich
Attendance: 7,800
Referee: (Switzerland) Jean Dubach (Nidau)

26 November 1972
14:30

BSC Young Boys	0–4	Basel
Brechbühl (yellow card) 65'	YB summary FCB summary	26' (0:1) Demarmels; 57' (0:2) Riner; 61' (0:3) Odermatt; 63' (0:4) Wenger

Wankdorf Stadium, Bern
Attendance: 11,500
Referee: (Switzerland) Anton Bucheli Luzern

== Quarter-finals ==
For the first time since three years, the quarter- and semi-finals were played as two legged fixtures. This was going to be a test, that would last for three years.

=== Summary ===
The first legs of the quarter-finals were played on 10 December and the return legs on 17 December 1972.

Team 1	Agg.	Team 2	1st leg	2nd leg
Sion	2–4	Winterthur	1–2	1–2
Zürich	5–1	Etoile Carouge	1–1	4–0
Biel-Bienne	2–1	Grasshopper Club	1–1	1–0
Chiasso	3–7	Basel	0–2	3–5

=== Matches ===
10 December 1972
14:30
First leg

Zürich	1–1	Etoile Carouge
Münch 15' (1:0)	FCZ summary	74' (1:1)

Letzigrund, Zürich
Attendance: 2,700
Referee: Rudolf Scheurer (Bettlach, Switzerland)

17 December 1972
14:30
Second leg

Etoile Carouge	0–4	Zürich
	FCZ summary	19' (0:1) Martinelli; 28' (0:2) Kuhn; 37' (0:3) Jeandupeux; (yellow card) 64' Heer; 69' (0:4) Martinelli

Stade de la Fontenette, Carouge
Attendance: 8,157
Referee: (Switzerland) Hans Wieland (Grenchen)

10 December 1972
14:30
First leg

Chiasso	0–2	Basel
Ferroni (yellow card) 68'; Sulmoni (yellow card) 70'	FCB summary	2' (0:1) Balmer; (yellow card) 37' Ramseier; (yellow card) 44' Wenger; 55' (0:2) Wenger

Stadio Comunale, Chiasso
Attendance: 4,000
Referee: (Switzerland) Roland Racine (Prilly)

17 December 1972
14:30
Second leg

Basel	5–3	Chiasso
Ries 12' (1:0); Balmer 15' (2:0); Hasler 64' (3:2); Odermatt 68' (4:2); Odermatt 89' (5:3)	FCB summary	32' (2:1) Allio; 34' (2:2) Boriani; 79' (4:2) Messerli; (yellow card) 81' Katnic

St. Jakob Stadium, Basel
Attendance: 6,500
Referee: (Switzerland) Walter Gallmann (Oberrieden)

== Semi-finals ==
=== Summary ===
The first legs were played on 25 March and the return legs were played on 28 March 1973.

Team 1	Agg.	Team 2	1st leg	2nd leg
Winterthur	2–3	Zürich	1–1	1–2 (a.e.t.)
Biel-Bienne	1–6	Basel	0–1	1–5

=== Matches ===
25 March 1973
14:30
First leg

Winterthur	1–1	Zürich
Meili 2' (1:0); Oettli (yellow card) 84'	FCZ summary	63' (1:1) Stierli

Schützenwiese, Winterthur
Attendance: 12,700
Referee: Rudolf Scheurer (Bettlach, Switzerland)

28 March 1973
19:30
Second leg

Zürich	2–1 (a.e.t.)	Winterthur
Martinelli 36' (1:1); Rutschmann 100' (2:1)	FCZ summary	33' (0:1) Grünig

Letzigrund, Zürich
Attendance: 15,000
Referee: (Switzerland) Hans Wieland (Grenchen)

25 March 1973
20:15
First leg

Biel-Bienne	0–1	Basel
	FCB summary	76' (0:1) Hitzfeld

Gurzelen Stadion, Biel/Bienne
Attendance: 10,000
Referee: (Switzerland) Bruno Della Bruna (Lumino)

28 March 1973
19:30
Second leg

Basel	5–1	Biel-Bienne
Balmer 19' (1:1); Balmer 31' (2:1); Hitzfeld 36' (3:1); Balmer 51' (4:1); Demarmels 78' (6:1)	FCB summary	6' (0:1) Konrad

St. Jakob Stadium, Basel
Attendance: 7,800
Referee: (Switzerland) Walter Gallmann (Oberrieden)

== Final ==
The final was held at the former Wankdorf Stadium in Bern on Easter Monday 1973.

=== Summary ===
Team 1	Score	Team 2
23 April 1973
Zürich	2–0 (a.e.t.)	Basel

=== Telegram ===
23 April 1973
14:30

Zürich	2–0 (a.e.t.)	Basel
Münch (yellow card) 22'; Zigerlig (yellow card) 36'; Marti 92'; Künzli 101'; Bionda (yellow card) 104'	FCB summary	(yellow card) 41' Hitzfeld; (yellow card) 99' Demarmels; (yellow card) 104' Odermatt

Wankdorf, Bern
Attendance: 45,000
Referee: (Switzerland) Roland Keller (Bern)

For the third time in four years, following their encounters in 1970 and 1972, the two teams FCZ and FCB battled it out for the national cup title. After a 1–4 loss in extra time at the start of this trilogy and a 0–1 defeat last season, the club from the Rhine knee was shaky at the reunion. FCZ promptly triumphed in front of 45,000 spectators at Bern's Wankdorf stadium under the motto "All good things come in threes." On Easter Monday, 23 April 1973, they secured the fourth cup trophy in their history (the first, incidentally, had come in 1966, against Servette).

== Further in Swiss football ==
- 1972–73 Nationalliga A
- 1972–73 Swiss 1. Liga

== Sources ==
- Fussball-Schweiz
- FCB Cup games 1972–73 at fcb-achiv.ch
- Switzerland 1972–73 at RSSSF

Preceded by 1971–72	Swiss Cup seasons	Succeeded by 1973–74
