= 1969–70 Swiss Cup =

Tournament details
- Country: Switzerland

Final positions
- Champions: Zürich
- Runners-up: Basel

The 1969–70 Swiss Cup was the 45th season of Switzerland's football cup competition, organised annually since 1925–26 by the Swiss Football Association.

== Overview ==
This season's cup competition began on the weekend of 6 and 7 July 1969, with the first games of the first round. The competition was to be completed on Whit Monday 18 May 1970 with the final, which was traditionally held at the former Wankdorf Stadium in Bern. The clubs from this season's Nationalliga B (NLB) were given byes for the first two rounds and entered the competition in the third round. The clubs from this season's Nationalliga A (NLA) were granted byes for the first three rounds. These teams joined the competition in the fourth round, which was played on the week-end of 13 and 14 September.

The matches were played in a knockout format. In the event of a draw after 90 minutes, the match went into extra time. In the first two rounds, no replays were foreseen, at the end of extra time if the scores were level, a toss of a coin would decide the outcome of the match. After this first stage, from round 3 onwards, in the event of a draw at the end of extra time, a replay was foreseen and this was played on the visiting team's pitch. If the replay ended in a draw after extra time, a toss of a coin would decide the outcome of theses encounters. In this season the quarter-finals and semi-finals were played as two legged fixtures. This was going to be a test, but next season these round were played as single fixtures. The cup winners qualified themselves for the first round of the Cup Winners' Cup in the next season.

== Round 1 ==
In this first phase, the lower league teams (1. Liga and lower) that had qualified themselves for the competition through their regional football association's regional cup competitions or their association's requirements, competed here. Whenever possible, the draw respected local regionalities. The lower-tier team in each drawn tie was granted the home advantage, if they so wished.

=== Summary ===
Team 1	Score	Team 2
6 and 7 July 1969
FC Crissier	7–1	FC Gingins
Meyrin	(t) 1–1 (a.e.t.)	Chênois
Lancy-Sports	7–2	US Campagnes GE
Stade Nyonnais	4–1	FC Neyruz
FC Orbe	2–5	Vevey Sports
Montreux-Sports	3–1	Monthey
Martigny-Sports	n/p Bulle is qualified	Bulle
Stade Lausanne	2–1	FC Assens
Madretsch Biel	FF awd 0-3	Le Locle Sports
FC Mett	0–2	Yverdon-Sport
Colombier	0–6	Cantonal Neuchâtel
SV Lyss	1–3	Bern
FC Viktoria Bern	2–1	Dürrenast
Köniz	1–3	Minerva Bern
FC Aarberg	0–6	Burgdorf
Alle	2–2 (a.e.t.) (t)	FC Breitenbach
Moutier	2–5	FC Porrentruy
Lengnau	3–0	Fulgor Grenchen
Nordstern	1–2	FC Pratteln
Concordia	1–0	FC Breite Basel
FC Frenkendorf	1–1 (a.e.t.) (t)	Laufen
FC Reinach BL	5–1	Old Boys
SC Schöftland	2–0	FC Olten
SC Zofingen	2–3	FC Langenthal
FC Trimbach	5–1	FC Klus-Balsthal
FC Deitingen	5–0	Wohlen
Blue Stars	2–3	Brugg
FC Turgi	4–2	Polizei Zürich
FC Oerlikon ZH	2–0	Ballspielclub Zürich
Frauenfeld	10–0	Post Zürich
FC Neuhausen	1–3 (a.e.t.)	Uster
FC Turicum	2–4	Schaffhausen
Red Star	1–2	FC Küsnacht ZH
FC Wiedikon ZH	3–1	
FC Uznach	1–4	SC Zug
FC Rapperswil	5–2 (a.e.t.)	FC Dübendorf
FC Amriswil	2–0	FC Rebstein
FC Uzwil	3–4	FC Arbon
FC Engstringen	2–1	FC Fislisbach
Vaduz	3–1	FC Montlingen
Emmenbrücke	3–1 (a.e.t.)	FC Rapid Lugano
FC Hergiswil	2–1	FC Brunnen
Buochs	3–1	Luzerner SC
Locarno	3–1	US Giubiasco

== Round 2 ==
=== Summary ===
Team 1	Score	Team 2
2 and 3 August 1969
Bern	1–3 (a.e.t.)	Burgdorf
Buochs	1–0	Emmenbrücke
FC Turgi	5–2	Schaffhausen
SC Schöftland	1–0	Cantonal Neuchâtel
FC Frenkendorf	1–0	FC Reinach BL
FC Engstringen	0–6	Uster
FC Küsnacht ZH	1–0 (a.e.t.)	Frauenfeld
FC Amriswil	0–1	Vaduz
FC Wiedikon ZH	0–2	FC Arbon
SC Zug	3–1	Locarno
Montreux-Sports	4–1	Lancy-Sports
Vevey Sports	4–1	Stade Nyonnais
FC Crissier	3–5	Stade Lausanne
Brugg	2–5 (a.e.t.)	FC Rapperswil
FC Oerlikon	2–3 (a.e.t.)	FC Hergiswil
FC Breitenbach	1–4	Concordia
Yverdon-Sport	4–0	Meyrin
Bulle	1–3 (a.e.t.)	Le Locle Sports
FC Langenthal	0–2	Lengnau
FC Viktoria Bern	2–0	FC Porrentruy
FC Trimbach	0–1	Minerva Bern
FC Deitingen	1–0	FC Pratteln

== Round 3 ==
The teams from the NLB entered the cup competition in this round. However, they were seeded and could not be drawn against each other. Whenever possible, the draw respected local regionalities. The lower-tier teams in each encounter was granted the home advantage if they so wanted.

=== Summary ===
Team 1	Score	Team 2
16 and 17 August 1969
Thun	5–1	Burgdorf
Buochs	1–0	Chiasso
FC Turgi	3–1	SC Schöftland
Aarau	3–0	FC Frenkendorf
Uster	0–1	Baden
FC Küsnacht ZH	6–1	Vaduz
FC Arbon	0–2	Brühl
Mendrisiostar	2–1	SC Zug
Montreux-Sports	0–2	Urania Genève Sport
Etoile Carouge	1–0	Vevey Sports
Stade Lausanne	1–10	Sion
Young Fellows	10–1	FC Rapperswil
FC Hergiswil	0–11	Luzern
Concordia	0–0 (a.e.t.)	Solothurn
Xamax	3–1	Yverdon-Sport
Le Locle Sports	5–1	Lengnau
FC Viktoria Bern	0–1	Minerva Bern
Grenchen	6–0	FC Deitingen

Replay

Team 1	Score	Team 2
31 August 1969
Solothurn	(t) 0–0 (a.e.t.)	Concordia

=== Matches ===
17 August 1969

Aarau	3–0	FC Frenkendorf
Goal	FCA summary

Stadion Brügglifeld, Aarau

== Round 4 ==
The teams from the NLA entered the cup competition in the fourth round, they were seeded and could not be drawn against each other. The draw was still respecting regionalities, but the lower-tier team was not automatically granted home advantage.

=== Summary ===
Team 1	Score	Team 2
13 and 14 September 1969
Biel-Bienne	5–0	Thun
Buochs	2–0	FC Turgi
Aarau	0–2	Bellinzona
Lugano	4–0	Baden
FC Küsnacht ZH	1–8	Zürich
Grasshopper Club	1–0 (a.e.t.)	Brühl
Mendrisiostar	1–0	St. Gallen
Urania Genève Sport	3–1	Etoile Carouge
Sion	3–1 (a.e.t.)	Young Boys
Young Fellows	0–1	Wettingen
Luzern	3–3 (a.e.t.)	Winterthur
Servette	7–0	Solothurn
La Chaux-de-Fonds	3–5	Xamax
Fribourg	2–0	Le Locle Sports
Basel	10–0	Minerva Bern
Lausanne-Sport	0–2	Grenchen

Replay

Team 1	Score	Team 2
23 September 1969
Winterthur	4–2	Luzern

=== Matches ===
13 September 1969

Aarau	0–2	Bellinzona
	FCA summary	Goal

Stadion Brügglifeld, Aarau

13 September 1969

FC Küsnacht ZH	1–8	Zürich
Rebozzi 79' (o.g.)	FCZ summary	7' (0:1) Künzli; 29' (0:2) Künzli; 42' (pen.) Künzli; 64' (0:4) Martinelli; 66' (0:5) Kuhn; 82' (1:6) Kunz; 76' (0:7) Volkert; 83' (o.g.) Himmler

Sportanlage Heslibach, Küsnacht
Attendance: 3,300 (sold-out, stadium record)
Referee: (Switzerland) Rudolf Rettig (Gerlafingen)

13 September 1969

Servette	7–0	Solothurn
1x Németh; 3x Heutschi; 1x Olivier; 1x Schindelholz; 1x Desbiolles	Servette summary

Stade des Charmilles, Geneva

14 September 1969

Basel	10–0	Minerva
Hauser 17' (1:0); Hauser 35' (2:0); Wenger 41' (3:0); Ramseier 42' (4:0); Hauser 52' (5:0); Ramseier 59' (6:0); Hauser 68' (7:0); Balmer 69' (8:0); Michaud 77' (9:0); Balmer 85' (10:0)	FCB summary

St. Jakob Stadium, Basel
Attendance: 5,000
Referee: (Switzerland) Walter Gallmann Oberrieden

== Round 5 ==
=== Summary ===
Team 1	Score	Team 2
11 and 12 October 1969
Biel-Bienne	5–0	Buochs
Bellinzona	0–3	Lugano
Zürich	5–1	Grasshopper Club
Mendrisiostar	2–0	Urania Genève Sport
Sion	5–0	Wettingen
Winterthur	1–1 (a.e.t.)	Servette
Xamax	3–1	Fribourg
Basel	3–2	Grenchen

Replay

Team 1	Score	Team 2
22 October 1969
Servette	4–1	Winterthur

=== Matches ===
11 October 1969

Zürich	5–1	Grasshopper Club
Künzli 45' (1:1); Quentin 48' (2:1); Volkert 51' (3:1); Künzli 55' (4:1); Künzli 85' (5:1)	FCZ summary	7' (0:1) Rüegg; (yellow card) 16' Aerni; (yellow card) 60' Gröbli

Letzigrund, Zürich
Attendance: 14,500
Referee: (Switzerland) Roland Marendaz (Lausanne)

11 October 1969

Winterthur	1–1 (a.e.t.)	Servette
Goal	Servette summary	Heutschi

Schützenwiese, Winterthur

22 October 1969

Servette	4–1	Winterthur
3x Pottier; 1x Bosson	Servette summary	Goal

Stade des Charmilles, Geneva

12 October 1969

Basel	3–2	Grenchen
Wenger 36' (1:2); Michaud 60' (2:2); Demarmels 83' (3:2)	FCB summary	3' (0:1) Lander; 21' (0:2) Obrecht (II)

St. Jakob Stadium, Basel
Attendance: 6,700
Referee: (Switzerland) Marcel Despland (Yverdon)

== Quarter-finals ==
=== Summary ===
The first legs were played on 19 November and the return legs were played on 23 November

Team 1	Agg.	Team 2	1st leg	2nd leg
Biel-Bienne	2–5	Lugano	0–5	2–0
Zürich	4–2	Mendrisiostar	1–1	3–1 (a.e.t.)
Sion	2–4	Servette	2–0	0–4 (a.e.t.)
Xamax	2–7	Basel	0–2	2–5

=== Matches ===
19 November 1969
First leg

Zürich	1–1	Mendrisiostar
Grünig 18' (1:0)	FCZ summary	62' (pen.) Tomljenovic; (yellow card) Benkö; (yellow card) Rusconi; (yellow card) Caccia

Letzigrund, Zürich
Attendance: 2,300
Referee: (Switzerland) Roland Keller (Bern)

23 November 1969
Second leg

Mendrisiostar	3–1 (a.e.t.)	Zürich
Allio 29' (1:1)	FCZ summary	12' (0:1) Volkert; 97' (1:2) Corti; 111' (1:3) Künzli

Centro Sportivo Comunale, Mendrisio
Attendance: 4,500
Referee: (Switzerland) Karl Keller (Basel)

19 November 1969
First leg

Sion	2–0	Servette
Goal	Servette summary

Tourbillon, Sion

23 November 1969
Second leg

Servette	4–0 (a.e.t.)	Sion
2x Heutschi; 1x Schindelholz; 1x Bosson	Servette summary

Stade des Charmilles, Geneva

19 November 1969
20:15
First leg

Xamax	0–2	Basel
Stutz (yellow card)	Summary	38' (0:1) Hauser; 61' (pen. 0:2) Sundermann

Stade de la Maladière, Neuchâtel
Attendance: 4,200
Referee: (Switzerland) Mario Clematide (Zollikofen)

23 November 1969
Second leg

Basel	5–2	Xamax
Sundermann 23' (1:0); Hauser 42' (2:0); Balmer 44' (3:0); Odermatt 67' (4:1); Ramseier 84' (5:2)	Summary	61' (3:1) Manzoni; 74' (4:2) Schmid

St. Jakob Stadium, Basel
Attendance: 8,000
Referee: (Switzerland) Othmar Huber (Thun)

== Semi-finals ==
=== Summary ===
The first legs were played on and the return legs were played on 30 March the return legs on 8 April

Team 1	Agg.	Team 2	1st leg	2nd leg
Lugano	1–5	Zürich	0–2	1–3
Servette	1–6	Basel	0–2	1–4

=== Matches ===
30 March 1970
First leg

Lugano	0–2	Zürich
	FCZ summary	32' (0:1) Quentin; 54' (0:2) Volkert

Cornaredo Stadium, Lugano
Attendance: 13,000
Referee: (Switzerland) Gilbert Droz (Marin)

8 April 1970
Second leg

Zürich	3–1	Lugano
Quentin 4' (1:0); Volkert 26' (2:1); Volkert 60' (3:1)	FCZ summary	22' (1:1) Blättler

Letzigrund, Zürich
Attendance: 9,500
Referee: Rudolf Scheurer (Bettlach, Switzerland)

30 March 1970
First leg

Servette	0–2	Basel
	FCB summary	39' (0:1) Wenger; 50' (0:2) Odermatt

Charmilles Stadium, Geneva
Attendance: 14,000
Referee: (Switzerland) Anton Bucheli (Luzern)

8 April 1970
Second leg

Basel	4–1	Servette
Hauser 16' (1:0); Wenger 36' (2:0); Wenger 76' (3:1); Ramseier 85' (4:1)	FCB summary	63' (2:1) Nemeth

St. Jakob Stadium, Basel
Attendance: 16,000
Referee: (Switzerland) Pius Kamber (Zürich)

== Final ==
The final was held at the former Wankdorf Stadium in Bern on Whit Monday 1970.

=== Summary ===
Team 1	Score	Team 2
18 May 1970
Zürich	4–1 (a.e.t.)	Basel

=== Telegram ===
18 May 1970
15:00

Zürich	4–1 (a.e.t.)	Basel
Quentin 74' (1:1); Künzli 92' (2:1); Künzli 101' (3:1); Corti 113' (4:1)	Fussball-Schweiz summary	62' (0:1) Odermatt

Wankdorf, Bern
Attendance: 47,500
Referee: (Switzerland) Roland Marendaz (Lausanne)

Zürich won the cup and this was the club's second cup trophy to this date. This was to be the start of an unusual series, because in the next three seasons the two teams FCZ and FCB would be paired in a final clash twice more and Zürich would come out on top. After this painful start of this trilogy for Basel, with this 1–4 defeat in extra time,they would face a narrow 0–1 defeat next season. Finally, to end this trilogy in three seasons time, FCZ would promptly triumph on Easter Monday, 23 April 1973, again after extra time, to secured their third cup final victory against the same rivals, under the motto "All good things come in threes."

== Further in Swiss football ==
- 1969–70 Nationalliga A
- 1969–70 Swiss 1. Liga

== Sources ==
- Fussball-Schweiz
- FCB Cup games 1969–70 at fcb-achiv.ch
- Switzerland 1970–71 at RSSSF

Preceded by 1968–69	Swiss Cup seasons	Succeeded by 1970–71
