= 1969–70 Swiss 1. Liga =

1. Liga
- Season: 1969–70
- Champions: 1. Liga champions: Vevey-Sports; Group West: Vevey-Sports; Group Cenral: SR Delémont; Group South and East: FC Baden
- Promoted: Vevey-Sports; FC Monthey
- Relegated: Group West: US Campagnes GE; ES FC Malley; Group Central: FC Sursee; Group South and East: SCI Juventus Zürich; FC Oerlikon/Polizei ZH
- Matches: 3 times 156 plus 12 play-offs and 3 play-outs

The 1969–70 1. Liga season was the 38th season of the 1. Liga since its creation in 1931. At this time, the 1. Liga was the third tier of the Swiss football league system and it was the highest level of amateur football.

== Format ==
There were 39 teams competing in the 1. Liga 1969–70 season. They were divided into three regional groups, each group with 13 teams. Within each group, the teams would play a double round-robin to decide their league position. Two points were awarded for a win. The three group winners and the three runners-up then contested a play-off round to decide the two promotion slots. Five teams were relegated. The last placed teams in each group was directly relegated to the 2. Liga (fourth tier). The three second last placed teams competed a play-out round to decide the last two relegation slots.

== Group West ==
=== Teams, Locations ===
Club	Based in	Canton	Stadium	Capacity
ASI Audax-Friul	Neuchâtel	Neuchâtel	Pierre-à-Bot	1,700
FC Bern	Bern	Bern	Stadion Neufeld	14,000
US Campagnes GE	Geneva	Geneva		
CS Chênois	Thônex	Geneva	Stade des Trois-Chêne	8,000
FC Le Locle	Le Locle	Neuchâtel	Installation sportive - Jeanneret	3,142
ES FC Malley	Malley	Vaud	Centre sportif de la Tuilière	1,500
FC Meyrin	Meyrin	Geneva	Stade des Arbères	9,000
FC Minerva Bern	Bern	Bern	Spitalacker	1,450
FC Monthey	Monthey	Valais	Stade Philippe Pottier	1,800
FC Raron	Raron	Valais	Sportplatz Rhoneglut	1,000
FC Stade Nyonnais	Nyon	Vaud	Stade de Colovray	7,200
Vevey Sports	Vevey	Vaud	Stade de Copet	4,000
Yverdon-Sport FC	Yverdon-les-Bains	Vaud	Stade Municipal	6,600

=== Final league table ===
Pos	Team	Pld	W	D	L	GF	GA	GD	Pts	Qualification or relegation
1	Vevey-Sports	24	16	3	5	49	20	+29	35	Play-off to Nationalliga B
2	FC Monthey	24	14	4	6	66	34	+32	32	Play-off to Nationalliga B
3	FC Stade Nyonnais	24	11	6	7	48	32	+16	28	
4	FC Raron	24	9	9	6	34	33	+1	27	
5	FC Meyrin	24	10	5	9	40	41	−1	25	
6	CS Chênois	24	9	6	9	29	31	−2	24	
7	FC Le Locle	24	11	2	11	41	46	−5	24	
8	FC Minerva Bern	24	9	6	9	24	36	−12	24	
9	FC Bern	24	9	3	12	42	34	+8	21	
10	Yverdon-Sport FC	24	6	7	11	30	36	−6	19	
11	ASI Audax-Friul	24	7	5	12	23	45	−22	19	
12	US Campagnes GE	24	6	5	13	26	39	−13	17	To relegation play-out
13	ES FC Malley	24	7	3	14	31	56	−25	17	To relegation play-out

Source: RSSSF
Rules for classification: 1) Points; 2) Goal difference within the league, but decider play-off for qualifiers.

== Group Central ==
=== Teams, Locations ===
Club	Based in	Canton	Stadium	Capacity
FC Breitenbach	Breitenbach	Solothurn	Grien	2,000
FC Breite Basel	Basel	Basel-Stadt	Stadion Schützenmatte / Landhof	8,000 / 7,000
SC Burgdorf	Burgdorf	Bern	Stadion Neumatt	3,850
FC Concordia Basel	Basel	Basel-Stadt	Stadion Rankhof	7,000
SR Delémont	Delémont	Jura	La Blancherie	5,263
FC Dürrenast	Thun	Bern	Stadion Lachen	13,500
FC Emmenbrücke	Emmen	Lucerne	Stadion Gersag	8,700
FC Moutier	Moutier	Bern	Stade de Chalière	5,000
FC Nordstern Basel	Basel	Basel-Stadt	Rankhof	7,600
FC Porrentruy	Porrentruy	Jura	Stade du Tirage	4,226
FC Solothurn	Solothurn	Solothurn	Stadion FC Solothurn	6,750
FC Sursee	Sursee	Lucerne	Stadion Schlottermilch	3,500
SC Zofingen	Zofingen	Aargau	Sportanlagen Trinermatten	2,000

=== Final league table ===
Pos	Team	Pld	W	D	L	GF	GA	GD	Pts	Qualification or relegation
1	SR Delémont	24	15	7	2	47	20	+27	37	Play-off to Nationalliga B
2	FC Moutier	24	14	5	5	47	26	+21	33	Play-off to Nationalliga B
3	SC Burgdorf	24	11	7	6	43	28	+15	29	
4	FC Dürrenast	24	10	8	6	51	33	+18	28	
5	FC Porrentruy	24	8	11	5	34	26	+8	27	
6	FC Breite Basel	24	9	6	9	47	44	+3	24	
7	FC Solothurn	24	7	7	10	39	37	+2	21	
8	FC Emmenbrücke	24	7	6	11	24	32	−8	20	
9	FC Nordstern Basel	24	8	4	12	30	43	−13	20	
10	SC Zofingen	24	7	5	12	34	46	−12	19	
11	FC Breitenbach	24	7	5	12	37	52	−15	19	
12	FC Concordia Basel	24	6	6	12	27	42	−15	18	Play-out against relegation
13	FC Sursee	24	6	5	13	28	59	−31	17	Relegation to 2. Liga Interregional

Source: RSSSF
Rules for classification: 1) Points; 2) Goal difference within the league, but decider play-off for qualifiers.

== Group South and East ==
=== Teams, Locations ===
Club	Based in	Canton	Stadium	Capacity
FC Amriswil	Thurgau	Tellenfeld	1,000	
FC Baden	Baden	Aargau	Esp Stadium	7,000
SC Buochs	Buochs	Nidwalden	Stadion Seefeld	5,000
FC Frauenfeld	Frauenfeld	Thurgau	Kleine Allmend	6,370
SCI Juventus Zürich	Zürich	Zürich	Utogrund	2,850
FC Küsnacht	Küsnacht	Zürich	Sportanlage Heslibach	2,300
FC Locarno	Locarno	Ticino	Stadio comunale Lido	5,000
FC Oerlikon/Polizei ZH	Oerlikon (Zürich)	Zürich	Sportanlage Neudorf	1,000
FC Red Star Zürich	Zürich	Zürich	Allmend Brunau	2,000
FC Rorschach	Rorschach	Schwyz	Sportplatz Kellen	1,000
FC Uster|	Uster	Zürich	Sportanlage Buchholz	7,000
FC Vaduz	Vaduz	Liechtenstein	Rheinpark Stadion	7,584
SC Zug	Zug	Zug	Herti Allmend Stadion	6,000

=== Final league table ===
Pos	Team	Pld	W	D	L	GF	GA	GD	Pts	Qualification or relegation
1	FC Baden	24	14	6	4	35	20	+15	34	Play-off to Nationalliga B
2	SC Buochs	24	13	6	5	49	27	+22	32	Play-off to Nationalliga B
3	FC Locarno	24	9	9	6	24	21	+3	27	
4	SC Zug	24	8	10	6	28	20	+8	26	
5	FC Amriswil	24	9	8	7	40	34	+6	26	
6	FC Küsnacht	24	8	8	8	26	27	−1	24	
7	FC Frauenfeld	24	9	5	10	30	33	−3	23	
8	FC Rorschach	24	7	9	8	29	32	−3	23	
9	FC Uster	24	9	5	10	35	39	−4	23	
10	FC Vaduz	24	7	8	9	32	33	−1	22	
11	FC Red Star Zürich	24	5	11	8	32	36	−4	21	
12	SCI Juventus Zürich	24	6	6	12	23	35	−12	18	Play-out against relegation
13	FC Oerlikon/Polizei ZH	24	4	5	15	28	54	−26	13	Relegation to 2. Liga Interregional

Source: RSSSF
Rules for classification: 1) Points; 2) Goal difference within the league, but decider play-off for qualifiers.

== Promotion play-off ==
The three group winners played a two legged tie against one of the runners-up to decide the finalists. The games were played on 7 and 14 June 1970.

=== Qualification round ===
Team 1	Score	Team 2
FC Baden	0–4	FC Monthey
FC Monthey	3–1	FC Baden

FC Monthey won 7–1 on aggregate and continued to the finals. FC Baden remain in the division.

Team 1	Score	Team 2
SR Delémont	3–3	SC Buochs
SC Buochs	3–1	SR Delémont

SC Buochs won 6–4 on aggregate and continued to the finals. SR Delémont qualified for finals as lucky loser

Team 1	Score	Team 2
Vevey-Sports	3–1	FC Moutier
FC Moutier	2–3	Vevey-Sports

Vevey-Sports won 6–3 on aggregate and continued to the finals. FC Moutier remain in the division.

=== Final round ===
The matches were played on 21 and 28 June.

Team 1	Score	Team 2
SC Buochs	1–0	Vevey-Sports
Vevey-Sports	2–1	SC Buochs

Vevey-Sports declaired 1. Liga champions and were promoted to 1970–71 Nationalliga B.

Team 1	Score	Team 2
FC Monthey	1–0	SR Delémont
SR Delémont	3–2	FC Monthey

=== Play-off for second place ===
This took place on 5 July at Stadion Neufeld in Bern

Team 1	Score	Team 2
FC Monthey	1–0	SR Delémont

FC Monthey won and were promoted to 1970–71 Nationalliga B. SR Delémont remain in the division.

== Relegation play-out ==
=== First round ===
The play-outs took place on 21 June.

Team 1	Score	Team 2
US Campagnes GE	1–2	ES FC Malley

ES FC Malley won and continued in the final. US Campagnes GE were relegated directly to 2. Liga Interregional.

Team 1	Score	Team 2
FC Concordia Basel	3–1	SCI Juventus Zürich

FC Concordia Basel continued in the final. SCI Juventus Zürich were directly relegated to 2. Liga Interregional.

=== Final ===
The final took place on 28 June 1970.

Team 1	Score	Team 2
ES FC Malley	0–3	FC Concordia Basel

FC Concordia Basel remain in the division. ES FC Malley were relegated to 2. Liga Interregional.

== Further in Swiss football ==
- 1969–70 Nationalliga A
- 1969–70 Nationalliga B
- 1969–70 Swiss Cup

== Sources ==
- Switzerland 1969–70 at RSSSF

Preceded by 1968–69	Seasons in Swiss 1. Liga	Succeeded by 1970–71
