= 1971–72 Swiss Cup =

Tournament details
- Country: Switzerland

Final positions
- Champions: Zürich
- Runners-up: Basel

The 1971–72 Swiss Cup was the 47th season of Switzerland's football cup competition, organised annually since 1925–26 by the Swiss Football Association.

== Overview ==
This season's cup competition began on the weekend of 4 and 5 September 1971, with the first games of the first round. The competition was to be completed on Whit Monday 22 May 1972 with the final, which was held at the former Wankdorf Stadium in Bern. The clubs from this season's Nationalliga B (NLB) were given byes for the first two rounds and entered the competition in the third round. The clubs from this season's Nationalliga A (NLA) were granted byes for the first three rounds. These teams joined the competition in the fourth round, which was played on the week-end of 23 and 24 October.

The matches were played in a knockout format. In the event of a draw after 90 minutes, the match went into extra time. In the event of a draw at the end of extra time, a replay was foreseen and this was played on the visiting team's pitch. If the replay ended in a draw after extra time, a toss of a coin would decide the outcome of the match. The winners of the cup qualified themselves for the first round of the Cup Winners' Cup in the next season.

== Round 1 ==
In this first phase, the lower league teams (1. Liga and lower) that had qualified themselves for the competition through their regional football association's regional cup competitions or their association's requirements, competed here. Whenever possible, the draw respected local regionalities. The lower-tier team in each drawn tie was granted the home advantage.

=== Summary ===
Team 1	Score	Team 2
4 and 5 September 1971
FC Münchwilen	1–4	FC Rorschach
FC Adliswil	0–1	Red Star
Vaduz	2–1	FC Rebstein
SC Zug	4–2 (a.e.t.)	FC Menziken
FC Amriswil	1–2 (a.e.t.)	Gossau
Juventus Zürich	2–1	FC Turicum (Zürich)
Montreux-Sports	1–2	Stade Nyonnais
Bulle	4–1 (a.e.t.)	US Collombey-Muraz
ASI Audax-Friul	2–3 (a.e.t.)	FC Aurore Bienne
FC Kirchberg BE	0–3	FC Viktoria Bern
Nordstern	1–2	Baden
SC Baudepartement Basel	3–6	Concordia
Locarno	6–2	SC Goldau
US Giubiasco	2–1	Biasa
Blue Stars	1–1 (a.e.t.)	FC Wiedikon
FC Heiden	1–4	Arbon
FC Raron	7–0	Concordia Lausanne
Urania Genève Sport	3–3 (a.e.t.)	Meyrin
Meyrin	3–1	Urania Genève Sport
FC Breite Basel	4–1	FC Trimbach
Delémont	2–0	FC Reconvillier
FC Fontainemelon	5–1	FC Tramelan
FC Saint-Imier	6–3	FC Bévillard
Buochs	6–1	FC Reinach AG
FC Rapid Lugano	1–2	Armonia Lugano
SC Kleinhüningen	1–3	FC Breitenbach
Laufen	3–2 (a.e.t.)	FC Frenkendorf
Yverdon-Sport	4–2	Signal FC (Bernex)
FC Collex-Bossy	3–5 (a.e.t.)	FC Assens
CS La Tour-de-Peilz	3–0	FC Chalais
Forward Morges	2–1	Stade Lausanne
Emmenbrücke	2–1	Wangen bei Olten
FC Küssnacht am Rigi	3–4	Kriens
FC Turgi	2–0 (a.e.t.)	FC Neuhausen
FC Oftringen	0–1	FC Reinach BL
Dürrenast	5–1	Central Fribourg
Thun	4–1	Minerva Bern
FC Portalban	1–2	Solothurn
Zähringia Bern	4–2	Bern
FC Uznach	2–1	Frauenfeld
FC Lachen	3–6	Young Fellows
FC Tössfeld (Winterthur)	4–1	FC Wetzikon
Chur	5–1	FC Triesen
Burgdorf	1–2 (a.e.t.)	Bözingen 34
Le Locle-Sports	2–2	FC Porrentruy

Replays

Team 1	Score	Team 2
8 September 1971
FC Wiedikon	3–4	Blue Stars
Meyrin	3–1	Urania Genève Sport
FC Porrentruy	1–3	Le Locle-Sports

== Round 2 ==
=== Summary ===
Team 1	Score	Team 2
17 and 18 September 1971
FC Rorschach	3–1	Red Star
SC Zug	1–1 (a.e.t.)	Vaduz
Gossau	2–5	Juventus Zürich
Stade Nyonnais	1–2	Bulle
FC Aurore Bienne	0–1	FC Viktoria Bern
Baden	2–1	Concordia
Locarno	3–1	US Giubiasco
Blue Stars	3–2	Arbon
FC Raron	3–2 (a.e.t.)	Meyrin
FC Breite Basel	0–0	Delémont
FC Fontainemelon	3–2	FC Saint-Imier
Buochs	2–1 (a.e.t.)	Armonia Lugano
FC Breitenbach	0–5	Laufen
Yverdon-Sport	1–0	FC Assens
CS La Tour-de-Peilz	2–1	Forward Morges
Emmenbrücke	0–1	Kriens
FC Turgi	1–2	Reinach BL
Dürrenast	1–2 (a.e.t.)	Thun
Solothurn	3–1	Zähringia Bern
FC Uznach	5–2	Young Fellows
FC Tössfeld (Winterthur)	0–1	Chur
Bözingen 34	1–0	Le Locle-Sports

Replays

Team 1	Score	Team 2
22 September 1971
Vaduz	3–1	SC Zug
29 September 1971
Delémont	1–0	FC Breite Basel

== Round 3 ==
The teams from the NLB entered the cup competition in this round. However, they were seeded and could not be drawn against each other. Whenever possible, the draw respected local regionalities. The lower-tier team in each drawn tie was granted the home advantage.

=== Summary ===
Team 1	Score	Team 2
2 and 3 October 1971
FC Rorschach	2–0	Vaduz
Wettingen	2–1	Juventus Zürich
Bulle	0–5	Vevey Sports
FC Viktoria Bern	0–4	Martigny-Sports
Brühl	4–0	Baden
Locarno	1–2	Bellinzona
Etoile Carouge	2–0	FC Raron
Delémont	0–1	FC Fontainemelon
Laufen	0–6	Xamax
Monthey	3–0	Yverdon-Sport
Chênois	5–0	CS La Tour-de-Peilz
US Gambarogno	0–1	Kriens
Reinach BL	0–2	Fribourg
Thun	6–1	Solothurn
Bözingen 34	0–3	Aarau
FC Uznach	0–0 (a.e.t.)	Chur
Mendrisiostar	0–0 (a.e.t.)	Blue Stars
Chiasso	1–1 (a.e.t.)	Buochs

Replays

Team 1	Score	Team 2
12 October 1971
Blue Stars	0–1 (a.e.t.)	Mendrisiostar
Buochs	0–0 (a.e.t.) (1–3 p)	Chiasso
14 October 1971
Chur	2–0	FC Uznach

=== Matches ===
2 October 1971

FC Bözingen 34	0–3	Aarau
	FCA summary	Goal

Längfeld 1, Biel/Bienne

== Round 4 ==
The teams from the NLA entered the cup competition in the fourth round, they were seeded and could not be drawn against each other. The draw was still respecting regionalities, but the lower-tier team was no longer granted home advantage.

=== Summary ===
Team 1	Score	Team 2
23 and 24 October 1971
St. Gallen	3–0	FC Rorschach
Lugano	3–1	Wettingen
Biel-Bienne	3–1 (a.e.t.)	Vevey Sports
Martigny-Sports	0–4	Sion
Winterthur	1–2	Brühl
Zürich	5–2	Bellinzona
Mendrisiostar	1–3 (a.e.t.)	Grenchen
Young Boys	10–0	Etoile Carouge
FC Fontainemelon	0–3	Lausanne-Sport
Xamax	1–2	La Chaux-de-Fonds
Chur	1–3 (a.e.t.)	Aarau
Basel	3–1	Monthey
Servette	3–1	Chênois
Luzern	5–1	Kriens
Chiasso	1–1 (a.e.t.)	Grasshopper Club
Fribourg	1–1 (a.e.t.)	Thun

Replays

Team 1	Score	Team 2
27 October 1971
Grasshopper Club	2–0	Chiasso
3 November 1971
Thun	2–3 (a.e.t.)	Fribourg

=== Matches ===
23 October 1971
20:00

Basel	3–1	Monthey
Hitzfeld 39' (1:1); Odermatt 42' (2:1); Blättler 80' (3:1)	FCB summary	21' (0:1) Messerli

St. Jakob Stadium, Basel
Attendance: 4,891
Referee: (Switzerland) Roland Racine Prilly

23 October 1971

Servette	3–1	Chênois
Németh; Dörfel (2:0); Desbiolles	Servette summary	Goal

Stade des Charmilles, Geneva

24 October 1971

Zürich	5–2	Bellinzona
Kuhn 19' (1:0); Martinelli 31' (2:0); Künzli 43' (3:0); Künzli 84' (4:2); Rutschmann 86' (5:2)	FCZ summary	47' (3:1) Morinini; 56' (3:2) Guidotti

Letzigrund, Zürich
Attendance: 2,800
Referee: (Switzerland) Walter Hungerbühler (St. Gallen)

24 October 1971

Young Boys	10–0	Etoile Carouge
Goal	YB summary

Wankdorf Stadium, Bern

24 October 1971

Chur	1–3 (a.e.t.)	Aarau
Goal	FCA summary	Goal

Ringstrasse, Chur

== Round 5 ==
=== Summary ===
Team 1	Score	Team 2
20 November 1972
La Chaux-de-Fonds	0–3	Basel
21 November 1972
Biel-Bienne	2–1	Sion
12 December 1972
Brühl	0–2	Zürich
St. Gallen	5–0	Lugano
Lausanne-Sport	1–2	Grasshopper Club
Servette	1–0	Luzern
Fribourg	3–0	Aarau
Grenchen	1–1 (a.e.t.)	Young Boys

Replay

Team 1	Score	Team 2
19 December 1972
Young Boys	1–0	Grenchen

=== Matches ===
21 November
14:30

La Chaux-de-Fonds	0 – 3	Basel
	FCB summary	Blättler 34' (1:0); Hitzfeld 73' (2:0); Blättler 79' (3:0)

St. Jakob Stadium, Basel
Attendance: 4,500
Referee: (Switzerland) André Favre (Echallens)

5 December 1971

Brühl	0–2	Zürich
	FCZ summary	66' (0:1) Künzli; 69' (0:2) Rutschmann

Krontal, St. Gallen
Attendance: 1,500
Referee: (Switzerland) Ulysse Darbellay (Roche)

5 December 1971

Servette	1–0	Luzern
(o.g.)	Servette summary

Stade des Charmilles, Geneva

5 December 1971

Fribourg	3–0	Aarau
Goal	FCA summary

Stade Universitaire, Fribourg

5 December 1971

Grenchen	1–1 (a.e.t.)	Young Boys
Goal	YB summary	Goal

Stadium Brühl, Grenchen

19 December 1972
Replay

Young Boys	1–0	Grenchen
Goal	YB summary

Wankdorf Stadium, Bern

== Quarter-finals ==
=== Summary ===
Team 1	Score	Team 2
12 March 1972
Biel-Bienne	0–0 (a.e.t.)	St. Gallen
Zürich	2–1	Fribourg
Servette	0–1 (a.e.t.)	Young Boys
Grasshopper Club	1–1 (a.e.t.)	Basel

Replays

Team 1	Score	Team 2
15 March 1972
St. Gallen	1–0	Biel-Bienne
Basel	3–2	Grasshopper Club

=== Matches ===
12 March 1972

Zürich	2–1	Fribourg
Martinelli 71' (1:1); Jeandupeux 78' (2:1)	FCZ summary	26' (0:1) Kvicinsky

Letzigrund, Zürich
Attendance: 2,900
Referee: (Switzerland) Roland Racine (Prilly)

12 March 1972

Servette	0–1 (a.e.t.)	Young Boys
	Servette summary YB summary	Goal

Stade des Charmilles, Geneva

12 March 1972
14:30

Grasshopper-Club	1–1 (a.e.t.)	Basel
Meier 56' (1:0)	FCB ummary	66' (1:1) Rahmen; (yellow card) 97' Hasler

Hardturm, Zürich
Attendance: 16,000
Referee: (Switzerland) Bruno Della Bruna (Lumino)

15 March 1972
20:00
Replay

Basel	3–2	Grasshopper-Club
Hasler 7' (1:0); Rahmen 77' (2:1); Hitzfeld 78' (3:1)	Summary	53' (1:1) Müller; 88' (3:2) Meier

St. Jakob Stadium, Basel
Attendance: 33,000
Referee: (Switzerland) Walter Hungerbühler (St. Gallen)

== Semi-finals ==
=== Summary ===
Team 1	Score	Team 2
3 April 1972
St. Gallen	2–3	Zürich
Young Boys	0–2	Basel

=== Matches ===
3 April 1972

St. Gallen	2–3	Zürich
Perušić 53' (1:3); Cornioley 89' (2:3)	FCZ summary	8' (0:1) Künzli; 17' (0:2) Konietzka; 45' (0:3) Heer; (yellow card) 88' Heer

Espenmoos, St. Gallen
Attendance: 9,500
Referee: (Switzerland) Roland Keller (Bern)

3 April 1972

BSC Young Boys	0–2	Basel
Messerli (yellow card) 39'	FCB summary YB summary	5' (1:0) Karl Odermatt; (yellow card) 39' Hitzfeld; 82' (2:0) Walter Balmer

Wankdorf Stadium, Bern
Attendance: 50,000
Referee: (Switzerland) Walter Gallmann (Oberrieden)

== Final ==
The final was held at the former Wankdorf Stadium in Bern on Whit Monday 1972.

=== Summary ===
Team 1	Score	Team 2
22 May 1972
Zürich	1–0	Basel

=== Telegram ===
22 May 1972
14:30

Zürich	1–0 (a.e.t.)	Basel
Jeandupeux 45'; Jeandupeux (yellow card) 90'	Fussball-Schweiz summary FCB summary

Wankdorf, Bern
Attendance: 45,000
Referee: (Switzerland) Rudolf Scheurer Bettlach

For the second time in three years, following their encounter in 1970, the two teams FCZ and FCB battled it out for the national cup title. After a 1–4 loss in extra time on the last occasion, the club from the Rhine knee was shaky at the reunion. FCZ promptly triumphed in front of 45,000 spectators at Bern's Wankdorf stadium. On Whit Monday, 22 May 1972, they secured the third cup trophy in their history (the first, incidentally, had come in 1966, against Servette).

== Further in Swiss football ==
- 1971–72 Nationalliga A
- 1971–72 Swiss 1. Liga

== Sources ==
- Fussball-Schweiz
- FCB Cup games 1971–72 at fcb-achiv.ch
- Switzerland 1971–72 at RSSSF

Preceded by 1970–71	Swiss Cup seasons	Succeeded by 1972–73
