= 1970–71 Swiss 1. Liga =

1. Liga
- Season: 1970–71
- Champions: 1. Liga champions: CS Chênois; Group West: CS Chênois; Group Cenral: SR Delémont; Group South and East: SC Buochs
- Promoted: CS Chênois; AS Gambarogno
- Relegated: Group West: FC Langenthal; FC Salgesch; Group Central: FC Moutier; SC Zofingen; Group South and East: FC Küsnacht; FC Uster
- Matches: 3 times 156 plus 9 play-offs

The 1970–71 1. Liga season was the 39th season of this league since its creation in 1931. At this time, the 1. Liga was the third tier of the Swiss football league system and it was the highest level of amateur football. Most of the teams in the NLA and NLB were professional clubs.

== Format ==
There were 39 teams competing in the 1. Liga 1970–71 season. These teams were divided into three regional groups, each group with 13 teams. Within each group, the teams would play a double round-robin to decide their league position. Two points were awarded for a win. The three group winners and the three runners-up then contested a play-off round to decide the two promotion slots. The last two placed teams in each group were directly relegated to the 2. Liga (fourth tier).

== Group West ==
=== Teams, locations ===
Club	Town	Canton	Stadium	Capacity
ASI Audax-Friul	Neuchâtel	Neuchâtel	Pierre-à-Bot	1,700
FC Bern	Bern	Bern	Stadion Neufeld	14,000
SC Burgdorf	Burgdorf	Bern	Stadion Neumatt	3,850
CS Chênois	Thônex	Geneva	Stade des Trois-Chêne	8,000
FC Dürrenast	Thun	Bern	Stadion Lachen	13,500
FC Langenthal	Langenthal	Bern	Rankmatte	2,000
FC Meyrin	Meyrin	Geneva	Stade des Arbères	9,000
FC Minerva Bern	Bern	Bern	Spitalacker	1,450
FC Stade Nyonnais	Nyon	Vaud	Stade de Colovray	7,200
FC Raron	Raron	Valais	Sportplatz Rhoneglut	1,000
FC Salgesch	Salgesch	Valais	Sportplatz Salgesch	1,000
FC Thun	Thun	Bern	Stadion Lachen	10,350
Yverdon-Sport FC	Yverdon-les-Bains	Vaud	Stade Municipal	6,600

=== Final league table ===
Pos	Team	Pld	W	D	L	GF	GA	GD	Pts	Qualification or relegation
1	CS Chênois	24	14	6	4	45	24	+21	34	Play-off to Nationalliga B
2	FC Stade Nyonnais	24	13	7	4	55	28	+27	33	Play-off to Nationalliga B
3	FC Dürrenast	24	11	8	5	40	31	+9	30	
4	FC Bern	24	10	7	7	48	35	+13	27	
5	ASI Audax-Friul	24	9	6	9	46	56	−10	24	
6	FC Thun	24	9	5	10	43	43	0	23	
7	FC Meyrin	24	7	8	9	44	38	+6	22	
8	FC Raron	24	7	8	9	30	29	+1	22	
9	Yverdon-Sport FC	24	8	6	10	36	46	−10	22	
10	SC Burgdorf	24	7	7	10	34	42	−8	21	
11	FC Minerva Bern	24	7	7	10	29	43	−14	21	
12	FC Langenthal	24	7	5	12	50	59	−9	19	Relegation to 2. Liga Interregional
13	FC Salgesch	24	5	4	15	33	59	−26	14	Relegation to 2. Liga Interregional

Source: RSSSF
Rules for classification: 1) Points; 2) Goal difference within the league, but decider play-off for qualifiers; 3) Goals scored; 4) Head-to-head points; 5) Away goals scored; 6) Draw.

== Group Central ==
=== Teams, locations ===
Club	Town	Canton	Stadium	Capacity
FC Baden	Baden	Aargau	Esp Stadium	7,000
FC Breite Basel	Basel	Basel-Stadt	Stadion Schützenmatte / Landhof	8,000 / 7,000
FC Breitenbach	Breitenbach	Solothurn	Grien	2,000
FC Concordia Basel	Basel	Basel-Stadt	Stadion Rankhof	7,000
SR Delémont	Delémont	Jura	La Blancherie	5,263
FC Emmenbrücke	Emmen	Lucerne	Stadion Gersag	8,700
FC Le Locle-Sports	Le Locle	Neuchâtel	Installation sportive - Jeanneret	3,142
FC Moutier	Moutier	Bern	Stade de Chalière	5,000
FC Nordstern Basel	Basel	Basel-Stadt	Rankhof	7,600
FC Porrentruy	Porrentruy	Jura	Stade du Tirage	4,226
FC Solothurn	Solothurn	Solothurn	Stadion FC Solothurn	6,750
FC Turgi	Turgi	Aargau	Sportanlage Oberau	1,000
SC Zofingen	Zofingen	Aargau	Sportanlagen Trinermatten	2,000

=== Final league table ===
Pos	Team	Pld	W	D	L	GF	GA	GD	Pts	Qualification or relegation
1	SR Delémont	24	16	5	3	55	21	+34	37	Play-off to Nationalliga B
2	FC Le Locle-Sports	24	13	3	8	55	41	+14	29	Play-off to Nationalliga B
3	FC Porrentruy	24	10	8	6	38	27	+11	28	
4	FC Solothurn	24	12	3	9	45	39	+6	27	
5	FC Breite Basel	24	11	5	8	42	37	+5	27	
6	FC Nordstern Basel	24	11	4	9	50	43	+7	26	
7	FC Breitenbach	24	12	1	11	40	48	−8	25	
8	FC Concordia Basel	24	9	5	10	37	40	−3	23	
9	FC Turgi	24	7	8	9	37	40	−3	22	
10	FC Baden	24	8	6	10	29	33	−4	22	
11	FC Emmenbrücke	24	8	5	11	41	46	−5	21	
12	FC Moutier	24	8	2	14	44	53	−9	18	Relegation to 2. Liga Interregional
13	SC Zofingen	24	3	1	20	26	71	−45	7	Relegation to 2. Liga Interregional

Source: RSSSF
Rules for classification: 1) Points; 2) Goal difference within the league, but decider play-off for qualifiers; 3) Goals scored; 4) Head-to-head points; 5) Away goals scored; 6) Draw.

== Group South and East ==
=== Teams, locations ===
Club	Town	Canton	Stadium	Capacity
FC Amriswil	Amriswil	Thurgau	Tellenfeld	1,000
FC Blue Stars Zürich	Zürich	Zürich	Hardhof	1,000
SC Buochs	Buochs	Nidwalden	Stadion Seefeld	5,000
FC Chur	Chur	Grisons	Ringstrasse	2,820
FC Frauenfeld	Frauenfeld	Thurgau	Kleine Allmend	6,370
AS Gambarogno	Gambarogno	Ticino	Centro Sportivo Regionale Magadino	1,100
FC Küsnacht	Küsnacht	Zürich	Sportanlage Heslibach	2,300
FC Locarno	Locarno	Ticino	Stadio comunale Lido	5,000
FC Red Star Zürich	Zürich	Zürich	Allmend Brunau	2,000
FC Rorschach	Rorschach	Schwyz	Sportplatz Kellen	1,000
FC Uster	Uster	Zürich	Sportanlage Buchholz	7,000
FC Vaduz	Vaduz	Liechtenstein	Rheinpark Stadion	7,584
SC Zug	Zug	Zug	Herti Allmend Stadion	6,000

=== Final league table ===
Pos	Team	Pld	W	D	L	GF	GA	GD	Pts	Qualification or relegation
1	SC Buochs	24	18	2	4	54	25	+29	38	Play-off to Nationalliga B
2	AS Gambarogno	24	14	7	3	51	18	+33	35	Play-off to Nationalliga B
3	FC Frauenfeld	24	14	4	6	46	30	+16	32	
4	FC Chur	24	13	4	7	48	31	+17	30	
5	FC Red Star Zürich	24	11	4	9	27	35	−8	26	
6	FC Locarno	24	10	5	9	33	26	+7	25	
7	SC Zug	24	10	4	10	42	26	+16	24	
8	FC Rorschach	24	7	7	10	30	43	−13	21	
9	FC Amriswil	24	8	3	13	26	38	−12	19	
10	FC Vaduz	24	7	4	13	32	42	−10	18	
11	FC Blue Stars Zürich	24	7	3	14	25	46	−21	17	
12	FC Küsnacht	24	5	4	15	26	55	−29	14	Relegation to 2. Liga Interregional
13	FC Uster	24	5	3	16	24	49	−25	13	Relegation to 2. Liga Interregional

Source: RSSSF
Rules for classification: 1) Points; 2) Goal difference within the league, but decider play-off for qualifiers; 3) Goals scored; 4) Head-to-head points; 5) Away goals scored; 6) Play-off.

== Promotion play-off ==
The three group winners played a two legged tie against one of the runners-up to decide the three finalists. The games were played on 6 and 13 June 1971.

=== Qualification round ===
Team 1	Score	Team 2
SR Delémont	0–1	AS Gambarogno
AS Gambarogno	1–0	SR Delémont

AS Gambarogno win 2–0 on aggregate and continue to the finals.

Team 1	Score	Team 2
FC Stade Nyonnais	2–6	SC Buochs
SC Buochs	1–1	FC Stade Nyonnais

SC Buochs win 7–3 on aggregate and continue to the finals.

Team 1	Score	Team 2
CS Chênois	2–2	FC Le Locle-Sports
FC Le Locle-Sports	0–4	CS Chênois

CS Chênois win 6–2 on aggregate and continue to the finals.

=== Final round ===
The three first round winners competed in a single round-robin to decide the two promotion slots. The games were played on 20 and 27 June and on 4 July 1971.

Pos	Team	Pld	W	D	L	GF	GA	GD	Pts	CHE	GAM	BUO
1	CS Chênois	2	1	1	0	4	1	+3	3	—	—	3–0
2	AS Gambarogno	2	0	2	0	1	1	0	2	1–1	—	—
3	SC Buochs	2	0	1	1	0	3	−3	1	—	0–0	—

Source: RSSSF
Rules for classification: 1) Points; 2) Goal difference; 3) Goals scored; 4) Head-to-head points; 5) Away goals scored; 6) Draw.

CS Chênois won 1. Liga championship and promotion to 1971–72 Nationalliga B. AS Gambarogno were runners-up and were also promoted to 1971–72 Nationalliga B.

== Further in Swiss football ==
- 1970–71 Nationalliga A
- 1970–71 Nationalliga B
- 1970–71 Swiss Cup

== Sources ==
- Switzerland 1970–71 at RSSSF

Preceded by 1969–70	Seasons in Swiss 1. Liga	Succeeded by 1971–72
