= 1970–71 Swiss Cup =

Tournament details
- Country: Switzerland

Final positions
- Champions: Servette
- Runners-up: Lugano

The 1970–71 Swiss Cup was the 46th season of Switzerland's football cup competition, organised annually since 1925–26 by the Swiss Football Association.

== Overview ==
This season's cup competition began on the weekend of 5 and 6 September 1970, with the first games of the first round. The competition was to be completed on Easter Monday 12 April 1971 with the final, which was traditionally held at the former Wankdorf Stadium in Bern. The clubs from this season's Nationalliga B (NLB) were given byes for the first two rounds and entered the competition in the third round. The clubs from this season's Nationalliga A (NLA) were granted byes for the first three rounds. These teams joined the competition in the fourth round, which was played on the week-end of 30 October and 1 November.

The matches were played in a knockout format. In the event of a draw after 90 minutes, the match went into extra time. In the event of a draw at the end of extra time, a replay was foreseen and this was played on the visiting team's pitch. If the replay ended in a draw after extra time, a toss of a coin would decide the outcome of the match. The winners of the cup qualified themselves for the first round of the Cup Winners' Cup in the next season.

== Round 1 ==
In this first phase, the lower league teams (1. Liga and lower) that had qualified themselves for the competition through their regional football association's regional cup competitions or their association's requirements, competed here. Whenever possible, the draw respected local regionalities. The lower-tier team in each drawn tie was granted the home advantage.

=== Summary ===
Team 1	Score	Team 2
5 and 6 September 1970
FC Langenthal	2–3	Burgdorf
Dürrenast	3–2	FC Rapid Ostermundigen
Red Star	2–1 (a.e.t.)	Baden
Polizei Zürich	3–1 (a.e.t.)	FC Küsnacht ZH
US Lausanne	1–4	FC Portalban
Stade Nyonnais	6–1	ES Malley
FC Olten	2–2 (a.e.t.)	FC Allschwil
FC Breitenbach	1–1 (a.e.t.)	Nordstern
FC Fislisbach	0–2	FC Tössfeld (Winterthur)
SV Höngg	1–2	FC Oberwinterthur
Delémont	3–2	FC Porrentruy
FC Fulgor Grenchen	1–3	FC Binningen
Solothurn	2–1	FC Tramelan
FC Breite Basel	4–0	FC Oberdorf
Moutier	4–2	FC Deitingen
FC Viktoria Bern	1–0	Grünstern Ipsach
Couvet-Sports	3–1 (a.e.t.)	FC Sonvillier
FC Saint-Maurice	2–3	Yverdon-Sport
Stade Lausanne	1–2	FC Salgesch
Bern	2–0	Minerva Bern
Kickers Luzern	2–1	FC Reinach AG
FC Ponte Tresa	2–2 (a.e.t.)	SC Goldau
FC Winterthur Töss	0–2	Blue Stars
FC Rorschach	5–4	FC Landquart
Schaffhausen	2–1	FC Wetzikon
Uster	1–2	FC Turgi
FC Chevenez	1–3	Laufen
FC Concordia Lausanne	4–2 (a.e.t.)	FC Raron
FC Onex	1–2	Meyrin
Le Locle Sports	4–1	ASI Audax-Friul (Neuchâtel)
FC Plan-les-Ouates	2–1	FC Moudon
FC Renens	1–5	Chênois
AS Novazzano	1–0	AS Gambarogno
Emmenbrücke	1–3	Buochs
FC Schöftland	5–0	FC Oberentfelden
SC Zug	0–1	SC Zofingen
FC Stäfa ZH	1–2	FC Uznach
Romanshorn	1–2	Vaduz
FC Altstätten (St. Gallen)	2–2 (a.e.t.)	Frauenfeld
Chur	2–1	FC Amriswil
Köniz	1–3	Thun
FC Fétigny	2–4	FC Interlaken
FC Wädenswil	4–1	FC Schmerikon
FC Rapid Lugano	1–1 (a.e.t.)	Locarno

Replays

Team 1	Score	Team 2
13 September 1970
FC Allschwil	3–4	FC Olten
Nordstern	4–1	FC Breitenbach
SC Goldau	3–1	FC Ponte Tresa
Frauenfeld	3–1	FC Altstätten (St. Gallen)
Locarno	4–1	FC Rapid Lugano

== Round 2 ==
The winners of the last round played in the second round, with the hope of advancing, so that they could play against some higher classed team.

=== Summary ===
Team 1	Score	Team 2
18 and 19 September 1970
Burgdorf	4–2	Dürrenast
Red Star	3–1	Polizei Zürich
FC Portalban	4–2 (a.e.t.)	Stade Nyonnais
FC Olten	5–2 (a.e.t.)	Nordstern
FC Tössfeld Winterthur	3–2	FC Oberwinterthur
Delémont	3–0	FC Binningen
Solothurn	1–2	FC Breite Basel
Moutier	3–2	FC Viktoria Bern
Couvet-Sports	2–3	Yverdon-Sport
FC Salgesch	0–3	Bern
Kickers Luzern	0–1	SC Goldau
Blue Stars	1–2	FC Rorschach
Schaffhausen	4–1	FC Turgi
Laufen	8–0	Concordia Lausanne
Meyrin	3–4 (a.e.t.)	Le Locle Sports
FC Plan-les-Ouates	1–4	Chênois
Novazzano	0–1	Buochs
FC Schöftland	3–1	SC Zofingen
FC Uznach	2–1	Vaduz
Frauenfeld	2–1	Chur
Thun	2–0	FC Interlaken
FC Wädenswil	3–2 (a.e.t.)	Locarno

== Round 3 ==
The teams from the NLB entered the cup competition in this round. However, they were seeded and could not be drawn against each other. Whenever possible, the draw respected local regionalities. The lower-tier team in each drawn tie was granted the home advantage.

=== Summary ===
Team 1	Score	Team 2
10 and 11 October 1970
Xamax	2–3	Burgdorf
Brühl	2–1 (a.e.t.)	Red Star
Etoile Carouge	10–1	FC Portalban
Aarau	1–0	FC Olten
FC Tössfeld Winterthur	1–3	Wettingen
Delémont	1–2	FC Breite Basel
Moutier	1–2 (a.e.t.)	Grenchen
Monthey	8–0	Yverdon-Sport
Bern	0–2	Martigny-Sports
SC Goldau	1–2	Mendrisiostar
FC Rorschach	1–2 (a.e.t.)	Schaffhausen
Laufen	1–1 (a.e.t.)	Le Locle Sports
Vevey Sports	2–3	Chênois
Chiasso	1–0	Buochs
FC Schöftland	3–2	FC Uznach
Young Fellows	4–1	Frauenfeld
Thun	2–1	Urania Genève Sport
St. Gallen	8–0	Wädenswil

Replay

Team 1	Score	Team 2
18 October 1970
Le Locle Sports	3–1	Laufen

=== Matches ===
10 October 1970

Aarau	1–0	FC Olten
(1:0)	FCA summary

Stadion Brügglifeld, Aarau

== Round 4 ==
The teams from the NLA entered the cup competition in the fourth round, they were seeded and could not be drawn against each other. The draw was still respecting regionalities, but the lower-tier team was not granted home advantage.

=== Summary ===
Team 1	Score	Team 2
30 October and 1 November 1970
Winterthur	2–0	Burgdorf
Zürich	3–0	Brühl
Servette	2–1	Etoile Carouge
Aarau	1–2	Young Boys
Wettingen	2–3	Sion
FC Breite Basel	1–0 (a.e.t.)	Grenchen
Monthey	2–2 (a.e.t.)	La Chaux-de-Fonds
Lausanne-Sport	2–1	Martigny-Sports
Mendrisiostar	3–1	Schaffhausen
Le Locle Sports	0–1	Biel-Bienne
Basel	5–1	CS Chênois
Bellinzona	2–0	Chiasso
FC Schöftland	0–1	Luzern
Lugano	1–1 (a.e.t.)	Young Fellows
Fribourg	3–1	Thun
St. Gallen	1–1 (a.e.t.)	Grasshopper Club

Replays

Team 1	Score	Team 2
18 November 1970
La Chaux-de-Fonds	3–4	Monthey
Young Fellows	0–2	Lugano
Grasshopper Club	3–0	St. Gallen

=== Matches ===
1 November 1970

Zürich	3–0	Brühl
Nüesch 40' (o.g.); Künzli 42' (2:0); Künzli 53' (3:0)	FCZ summary

Letzigrund, Zürich
Attendance: 3,300
Referee: (Switzerland) Roland Keller (Bern)

1 November 1970

Servette	2–1	Etoile Carouge
Pottier; Pottier	Servette summary	Goal

Stade des Charmilles, Geneva

1 November 1970

Aarau	1–2	Young Boys
Goal	FCA summary YB summary	Goal

Stadion Brügglifeld, Aarau

1 November 1969
14:45

Basel	5–1	CS Chênois
Sundermann (penalty missed) 3′ Demarmels 16' (1:1); Odermatt 47' (pen. 2:1); Odermatt 57' (3:1); Sundermann 60' (4:1); Paolucci 68' (4:1)	FCB summary	11' (0:1) Liechti

St. Jakob Stadium, Basel
Attendance: 5,400
Referee: (Switzerland) Bruno Della Bruna (Lumino)

== Round 5 ==
=== Summary ===
Team 1	Score	Team 2
28 and 29 November 1970
Winterthur	0–0 (a.e.t.)	Zürich
Servette	5–1	Young Boys
Sion	0–1	FC Breite Basel
Monthey	1–2	Lausanne-Sport
Mendrisiostar	2–1	Biel-Bienne
Basel	2–0	Bellinzona
Luzern	1–2 (a.e.t.)	Lugano
Fribourg	0–1	Grasshopper Club

Replay

Team 1	Score	Team 2
2 December 1970
Zürich	3–1	Winterthur

=== Matches ===
29 November 1970

Winterthur	0–0 (a.e.t.)	Zürich
	FCZ summary

Schützenwiese, Winterthur
Attendance: 11,500 (sold out)
Referee: (Switzerland) Anton Bucheli (Lucerne)

2 December 1970
Replay

Zürich	3–1	Winterthur
Künzli 3' (1:0); Martinelli 20' (2:0); Künzli 88' (3:1)	FCZ summary	66' (2:1) Fehr

Letzigrund, Zürich
Attendance: 7,500
Referee: Rudolf Scheurer (Bettlach, Switzerland)

28 November 1970

Servette	5–1	Young Boys
Blanchoud; Heutschi; Dörfel; Dörfel; Dörfel	Servette summary YB summary	Goal

Stade des Charmilles, Geneva

29 November 1969
14:30

Basel	2–0	Bellinzona
Balmer 56' (1:0); Wenger 73' (2:0)	FCB summary

St. Jakob Stadium, Basel
Attendance: 10,700
Referee: (Switzerland) Gérard Racine (Biel/Bienne)

== Quarter-finals ==
=== Summary ===
Team 1	Score	Team 2
27 February 1971
Mendrisiostar	2–0 (a.e.t.)	Basel
28 February 1971
Zürich	1–2	Servette
FC Breite Basel	0–1 (a.e.t.)	Lausanne-Sport
Lugano	2–1	Grasshopper Club

=== Matches ===
28 February 1971

Mendrisiostar	2–0 (a.e.t.)	Basel
Tomljenovic 96' (1:0); Allio 119' (2:0)	FCB summary

Centro Sportivo Comunale, Mendrisio, Mendrisio
Attendance: 4,000
Referee: (Switzerland) Ulysse Darbellay Roche

28 February 1971

Zürich	1–2	Servette
Künzli 52' (1:2)	FCZ summary	13' (0:1) Dörfel; 28' (0:2) Dörfel

Letzigrund, Zürich
Referee: (Switzerland)

28 February 1971

FC Breite Basel	0–1 (a.e.t.)	Lausanne-Sport
	summary	114' (0:1) Chapuisat

Landhof, Basel
Attendance: 9,000
Referee: (Switzerland)

== Semi-finals ==
=== Summary ===
Team 1	Score	Team 2
21 March 1971
Mendrisiostar	0–2	Lugano
23 March 1971
Servette	2–1	Lausanne-Sport

=== Matches ===
21 March 1971

Mendrisiostar	0–2	Lugano
	[ summary]	Blättler 53' (0:1); Tippelt 70' (0:2)

Centro Sportivo Comunale, Mendrisio

23 March 1971

Servette	2–1	Lausanne-Sport
Marchi 25' (1:0); Bosson 87' (2:1)	Servette summary	69' (1:1) Dürr

Stade des Charmilles, Geneva

== Final ==
The final was held at the former Wankdorf Stadium in Bern on Easter Monday 1971.

=== Summary ===
Team 1	Score	Team 2
12 May 1971
Servette	2–0	Lugano

=== Telegram ===
12 May 1971
15:00

Servette	2–0	Lugano
Desbiolles 55' (1:0); Marchi 78' (2:0)	Fussball-Schweiz

Wankdorf, Bern
Attendance: 36,500
Referee: (Switzerland) Pius Paul Kamber, Zürich

Servette won the cup and this was the club's third cup title to this date.

== Further in Swiss football ==
- 1970–71 Nationalliga A
- 1970–71 Swiss 1. Liga

== Sources ==
- Fussball-Schweiz
- FCB Cup games 1970–71 at fcb-achiv.ch
- Switzerland 1970–71 at RSSSF

Preceded by 1969–70	Swiss Cup seasons	Succeeded by 1971–72
