= 1971–72 Swiss 1. Liga =

1. Liga
- Season: 1971–72
- Champions: 1. Liga champions: FC Young Fellows Zürich; Group West: FC Stade Nyonnais; Group Cenral: SC Buochs; Group South and East: FC Young Fellows Zürich
- Promoted: FC Young Fellows Zürich; SC Buochs
- Relegated: Group West: CS La Tour-de-Peilz; FC Minerva Bern; Group Central: FC Breitenbach; SC Burgdorf; Group South and East: FC Rorschach; FC Amriswil
- Matches: 3 times 156 and 1 decider plus 9 play-offs

The 1971–72 1. Liga was the 40th season of this league since its creation in 1931. At this time, the 1. Liga was the third tier of the Swiss football league system and it was the highest level of amateur football.

== Format ==
There were 39 clubs in the 1. Liga. These were divided into three regional groups, each with 13 teams. Within each group, the teams would play a double round-robin to decide their league position. Two points were awarded for a win. The three group winners and the runners-up contested a play-off round to decide the two promotion slots. The last two placed teams in each group were directly relegated to the 2. Liga (fourth tier).

== Group West ==
=== Teams ===
Club	Canton	Stadium	Capacity
ASI Audax-Friul	Neuchâtel	Pierre-à-Bot	1,700
FC Bern	Bern	Stadion Neufeld	14,000
FC Central Fribourg	Fribourg	Guintzet	2,000
FC Dürrenast	Bern	Stadion Lachen	13,500
CS La Tour-de-Peilz	Vaud	Stade de Bel-Air	1,000
FC Le Locle	Neuchâtel	Installation sportive - Jeanneret	3,142
FC Meyrin	Geneva	Stade des Arbères	9,000
FC Minerva Bern	Bern	Spitalacker	1,450
FC Raron	Valais	Sportplatz Rhoneglut	1,000
FC Stade Nyonnais	Vaud	Stade de Colovray	7,200
FC Thun	Bern	Stadion Lachen	10,350
Urania Genève Sport	Geneva	Stade de Frontenex	4,000
Yverdon-Sport FC	Vaud	Stade Municipal	6,600

=== Final league table ===
Pos	Team	Pld	W	D	L	GF	GA	GD	Pts	Qualification or relegation
1	FC Stade Nyonnais	24	17	4	3	51	22	+29	38	Play-off to Nationalliga B
2	FC Raron	24	15	4	5	45	29	+16	34	Play-off to Nationalliga B
3	FC Bern	24	12	8	4	49	30	+19	32	
4	FC Meyrin	24	12	2	10	35	38	−3	26	
5	ASI Audax-Friul	24	10	5	9	41	35	+6	25	
6	Yverdon-Sport FC	24	9	5	10	36	40	−4	23	
7	FC Le Locle	24	6	10	8	31	30	+1	22	
8	Central Fribourg	24	8	6	10	39	53	−14	22	
9	Urania Genève Sport	24	8	5	11	41	34	+7	21	
10	FC Dürrenast	24	7	7	10	39	41	−2	21	
11	FC Thun	24	9	3	12	42	44	−2	21	
12	CS La Tour-de-Peilz	24	8	4	12	40	49	−9	20	Relegation to 2. Liga Interregional
13	FC Minerva Bern	24	1	5	18	19	63	−44	7	Relegation to 2. Liga Interregional

Source: RSSSF
Rules for classification: 1) Points; 2) Goal difference within the league, but decider play-off for qualifiers; 3) Goals scored; 4) Head-to-head points; 5) Away goals scored; 6) Draw.

== Group Central ==
=== Teams ===
Club	Canton	Stadium	Capacity
FC Baden	Aargau	Esp Stadium	7,000
FC Breite Basel	Basel-City	Stadion Schützenmatte / Landhof	8,000 / 7,000
FC Breitenbach	Solothurn	Grien	2,000
SC Burgdorf	canton of Bern	Stadion Neumatt	3,850
SC Buochs	Nidwalden	Stadion Seefeld	5,000
FC Concordia Basel	Basel-City	Stadion Rankhof	7,000
SR Delémont	Jura	La Blancherie	5,263
FC Emmenbrücke	Lucerne	Stadion Gersag	8,700
FC Laufen	Basel-Country	Sportplatz Nau	3,000
FC Nordstern Basel	Basel-Stadt	Rankhof	7,600
FC Porrentruy	Jura	Stade du Tirage	4,226
FC Solothurn	Solothurn	Stadion FC Solothurn	6,750
FC Turgi	Aargau	Sportanlage Oberau	1,000

=== Final league table ===
Pos	Team	Pld	W	D	L	GF	GA	GD	Pts	Qualification or relegation
1	SC Buochs	24	14	7	3	49	31	+18	35	Play-off to Nationalliga B
2	FC Emmenbrücke	24	14	5	5	67	38	+29	33	Play-off to Nationalliga B
3	FC Concordia Basel	24	14	4	6	48	35	+13	32	
4	FC Laufen	24	11	6	7	51	36	+15	28	
5	FC Breite Basel	24	11	4	9	42	40	+2	26	
6	FC Solothurn	24	11	4	9	43	41	+2	26	
7	FC Porrentruy	24	9	6	9	37	28	+9	24	
8	FC Nordstern Basel	24	9	5	10	45	37	+8	23	
9	FC Baden	24	8	6	10	42	40	+2	22	
10	SR Delémont	24	9	3	12	34	36	−2	21	
11	FC Turgi	24	5	7	12	34	52	−18	17	
12	FC Breitenbach	24	4	5	15	23	63	−40	13	Relegation to 2. Liga Interregional
13	SC Burgdorf	24	3	6	15	31	69	−38	12	Relegation to 2. Liga Interregional

Source: RSSSF
Rules for classification: 1) Points; 2) Goal difference within the league, but decider play-off for qualifiers; 3) Goals scored; 4) Head-to-head points; 5) Away goals scored; 6) Draw.

== Group South and East ==
=== Teams ===
Club	Canton	Stadium	Capacity
FC Amriswil	Thurgau	Tellenfeld	1,000
FC Blue Stars Zürich	Zürich	Hardhof	1,000
FC Chur	Grisons	Ringstrasse	2,820
FC Frauenfeld	Thurgau	Kleine Allmend	6,370
US Giubiasco	Ticino	Campo Semine	1,000
FC Gossau	St. Gallen	Sportanlage Buechenwald	3,500
FC Locarno	Locarno, Ticino	Stadio comunale Lido	5,000
FC Red Star Zürich	Zürich	Allmend Brunau	2,000
FC Rorschach	Schwyz	Sportplatz Kellen	1,000
FC Tössfeld	Zürich	Talgut	1,000
FC Vaduz	Liechtenstein	Rheinpark Stadion	7,584
FC Young Fellows Zürich	Zürich	Utogrund	2,850
SC Zug	Zug	Herti Allmend Stadion	6,000

=== Final league table ===
Pos	Team	Pld	W	D	L	GF	GA	GD	Pts	Qualification or relegation
1	FC Young Fellows Zürich	24	17	3	4	64	29	+35	37	Play-off to Nationalliga B
2	FC Vaduz	24	11	6	7	47	35	+12	28	To decider for second place
3	SC Zug	24	10	8	6	27	19	+8	28	To decider for second place
4	US Giubiasco	24	11	5	8	36	32	+4	27	
5	FC Locarno	24	11	5	8	36	32	+4	27	
6	FC Frauenfeld	24	11	4	9	37	34	+3	26	
7	FC Gossau	24	8	8	8	45	40	+5	24	
8	FC Blue Stars Zürich	24	10	4	10	43	47	−4	24	
9	FC Red Star Zürich	24	9	5	10	33	39	−6	23	
10	FC Chur	24	8	4	12	24	29	−5	20	
11	FC Tössfeld	24	8	3	13	30	44	−14	19	
12	FC Rorschach	24	6	4	14	28	43	−15	16	Relegation to 2. Liga Interregional
13	FC Amriswil	24	4	5	15	23	50	−27	13	Relegation to 2. Liga Interregional

Source: RSSSF
Rules for classification: 1) Points; 2) Goal difference within the league, but decider play-off for qualifiers; 3) Goals scored; 4) Head-to-head points; 5) Away goals scored; 6) Draw.

=== Decider for second place ===
The decider match for second place was played on 30 May 1972 in Küssnacht.

Team 1	Score	Team 2
SC Zug	4–1	FC Vaduz

SC Zug win and advance to play-offs. FC Vaduz remain in the division.

== Promotion play-off ==
The three group winners played a two legged tie against one of the runners-up to decide the three finalists. The games were played on

=== Qualification round ===
Team 1	Score	Team 2
FC Emmenbrücke	0–3	FC Young Fellows Zürich
FC Young Fellows Zürich	4–1	FC Emmenbrücke

FC Young Fellows Zürich win 7–1 on aggregate and continue to the finals.

Team 1	Score	Team 2
FC Raron	3–3	SC Buochs
SC Buochs	1–1	FC Raron

SC Buochs win on away goals and continue to the finals.

Team 1	Score	Team 2
FC Stade Nyonnais	1–1	SC Zug
SC Zug	1–1	FC Stade Nyonnais

FC Stade Nyonnais qualified as better classed team in the regular season and continue to the finals.

=== Final round ===
The three first round winners competed in a single round-robin to decide the two promotion slots. The games were played on

Pos	Team	Pld	W	D	L	GF	GA	GD	Pts	YFJ	BUO	NYO
1	FC Young Fellows Zürich	2	2	0	0	7	3	+4	4	—	2–1	—
2	SC Buochs	2	1	0	1	4	4	0	2	—	—	3–2
3	FC Stade Nyonnais	2	0	0	2	4	8	−4	0	2–5	—	—

Source: RSSSF

FC Young Fellows Zürich are 1. Liga champions, SC Buochs are runners-up and these two teams are promoted.

== Further in Swiss football ==
- 1971–72 Nationalliga A
- 1971–72 Nationalliga B
- 1971–72 Swiss Cup

== Sources ==
- Switzerland 1971–72 at RSSSF

Preceded by 1970–71	Seasons in Swiss 1. Liga	Succeeded by 1972–73
