= 1972–73 Nationalliga A =

Swiss football season

Nationalliga A
- Season: 1972–73
- Champions: Basel
- Relegated: Fribourg; Grenchen
- Top goalscorer: Ottmar Hitzfeld (Basel) and Ove Grahn (Lausanne-Sport) both 18 goals

Nationalliga B
- Season: 1972–73
- Champions: Xamax
- Promoted: Xamax; CS Chênois
- Relegated: SC Brühl; SC Buochs
- Top goalscorer: Jean-Robert Rub (Xamax) and Guy Mathez (Xamax) both 18 goals

The following is the summary of the Swiss National League in the 1972–73 football season, both Nationalliga A and Nationalliga B. This was the 76th season of top-tier and the 75th season of second-tier football in Switzerland.

== Overview ==
The Swiss Football Association (ASF/SFV) had 28 member clubs at this time which were divided into two divisions of 14 teams each. The teams played a double round-robin to decide their table positions. Two points were awarded for a win, and one point was awarded for a draw. The top tier (NLA) was contested by the top 12 teams from the previous 1971–72 season and the two newly promoted teams FC Chiasso and FC Fribourg. The champions would qualify for the 1973–74 European Cup. The second and third placed teams were qualified for the 1973–74 UEFA Cup. The last two placed teams were to be relegated.

The second-tier (NLB) was contested by the two teams that had been relegated from the NLA, FC Biel-Bienne and Luzern, the teams that had been in third to twelfth position last season and the two newly promoted teams Young Fellows Zürich and SC Buochs. The top two teams would be promoted and the last two teams relegated.

== Nationalliga A ==
The first round of the NLA was played on 14 August 1972. After playing 13 rounds, there was a winter break, held between 5 December and the 14th round on 5 March 1973. The season had 26 rounds and was completed on 10 June 1973.

=== Teams, locations ===
| Team | Town | Canton | Stadium | Capacity |
|---|---|---|---|---|
| FC Basel | Basel | Basel-Stadt | St. Jakob Stadium | 36,800 |
| FC Chiasso | Chiasso | Ticino | Stadio Comunale Riva IV | 4,000 |
| FC Fribourg | Fribourg | Fribourg | Stade Universitaire | 9,000 |
| Grasshopper Club Zürich | Zürich | Zürich | Hardturm | 20,000 |
| FC Grenchen | Grenchen | Solothurn | Stadium Brühl | 15,100 |
| FC La Chaux-de-Fonds | La Chaux-de-Fonds | Neuchâtel | Centre Sportif de la Charrière | 12,700 |
| FC Lausanne-Sport | Lausanne | Vaud | Pontaise | 15,700 |
| Lugano | Lugano | Ticino | Cornaredo Stadium | 6,330 |
| FC St. Gallen | St. Gallen | St. Gallen | Espenmoos | 11,000 |
| Servette FC | Geneva | Geneva | Stade des Charmilles | 27,000 |
| FC Sion | Sion | Valais | Stade de Tourbillon | 16,000 |
| FC Winterthur | Winterthur | Zürich | Schützenwiese | 8,550 |
| BSC Young Boys | Bern | Bern | Wankdorf Stadium | 56,000 |
| FC Zürich | Zürich | Zürich | Letzigrund | 25,000 |

=== Final league table ===
| Pos | Team | Pld | W | D | L | GF | GA | GD | Pts | Qualification |
|---|---|---|---|---|---|---|---|---|---|---|
| 1 | Basel | 26 | 17 | 5 | 4 | 57 | 30 | +27 | 39 | Swiss champions, qualified for 1973–74 European Cup |
| 2 | Grasshopper Club | 26 | 14 | 7 | 5 | 54 | 32 | +22 | 35 | Qualified for 1973–74 UEFA Cup and entered 1973 Intertoto Cup |
| 3 | Sion | 26 | 13 | 7 | 6 | 35 | 30 | +5 | 33 | Qualified for 1973–74 UEFA Cup |
| 4 | Servette | 26 | 14 | 3 | 9 | 41 | 23 | +18 | 31 | |
| 5 | Winterthur | 26 | 12 | 6 | 8 | 40 | 29 | +11 | 30 | Entered 1973 Intertoto Cup |
| 6 | Lausanne-Sport | 26 | 11 | 6 | 9 | 46 | 27 | +19 | 28 | |
| 7 | Zürich | 26 | 10 | 8 | 8 | 38 | 33 | +5 | 28 | Swiss Cup winners, qualified for 1973–74 Cup Winners' Cup and entered 1973 Intertoto Cup |
| 8 | Lugano | 26 | 9 | 9 | 8 | 31 | 30 | +1 | 27 | Entered 1973 Intertoto Cup |
| 9 | Young Boys | 26 | 9 | 5 | 12 | 39 | 40 | −1 | 23 | |
| 10 | La Chaux-de-Fonds | 26 | 8 | 7 | 11 | 30 | 43 | −13 | 23 | |
| 11 | Chiasso | 26 | 8 | 5 | 13 | 21 | 48 | −27 | 21 | |
| 12 | St. Gallen | 26 | 7 | 5 | 14 | 31 | 49 | −18 | 19 | |
| 13 | Fribourg | 26 | 4 | 7 | 15 | 24 | 43 | −19 | 15 | Relegated to 1973–74 Nationalliga B |
| 14 | Grenchen | 26 | 4 | 4 | 18 | 23 | 53 | −30 | 12 | Relegated to 1973–74 Nationalliga B |

Source: rsssf.com

=== Results ===
| Home \ Away | BAS | CDF | CHI | FRI | GCZ | GRE | LS | LUG | SER | SIO | STG | WIN | YB | ZÜR |
|---|---|---|---|---|---|---|---|---|---|---|---|---|---|---|
| Basel | | 7–1 | 4–0 | 3–0 | 0–1 | 2–0 | 2–1 | 5–2 | 2–2 | 2–3 | 4–3 | 3–1 | 2–0 | 2–1 |
| La Chaux-de-Fonds | 2–3 | | 1–1 | 2–0 | 0–1 | 1–1 | 0–4 | 3–1 | 1–3 | 3–1 | 0–1 | 1–0 | 2–1 | 1–1 |
| Chiasso | 0–0 | 2–0 | | 3–2 | 0–2 | 0–1 | 0–3 | 1–3 | 1–0 | 1–0 | 1–0 | 0–2 | 1–0 | 0–0 |
| Fribourg | 0–1 | 1–2 | 0–1 | | 0–0 | 3–2 | 0–1 | 1–1 | 0–1 | 2–1 | 1–3 | 1–1 | 2–2 | 1–0 |
| Grasshopper Club | 1–2 | 2–3 | 7–0 | 3–1 | | 3–0 | 2–1 | 3–1 | 2–0 | 2–2 | 2–2 | 2–2 | 3–1 | 3–0 |
| Grenchen | 1–2 | 1–1 | 3–1 | 1–0 | 1–2 | | 1–3 | 0–1 | 0–3 | 1–3 | 1–0 | 2–3 | 1–1 | 1–4 |
| Lausanne-Sports | 0–0 | 1–1 | 8–0 | 2–2 | 2–2 | 2–0 | | 1–0 | 1–0 | 0–1 | 2–2 | 2–1 | 5–1 | 1–2 |
| Lugano | 0–1 | 1–1 | 2–2 | 1–1 | 1–1 | 3–2 | 1–0 | | 0–1 | 1–1 | 4–0 | 1–0 | 1–0 | 0–0 |
| Servette | 0–0 | 1–2 | 2–0 | 2–1 | 0–1 | 2–0 | 1–0 | 0–1 | | 2–2 | 4–0 | 3–0 | 1–0 | 5–1 |
| Sion | 2–1 | 2–0 | 0–0 | 3–1 | 1–1 | 2–0 | 1–3 | 1–0 | 1–0 | | 1–0 | 1–0 | 0–3 | 2–2 |
| St. Gallen | 3–4 | 2–1 | 2–1 | 0–0 | 2–3 | 1–0 | 3–1 | 2–0 | 1–5 | 0–0 | | 0–4 | 0–0 | 1–3 |
| Winterthur | 3–1 | 1–1 | 3–2 | 4–2 | 3–1 | 0–0 | 1–0 | 1–3 | 3–0 | 0–1 | 1–0 | | 1–0 | 3–0 |
| Young Boys | 2–3 | 2–0 | 3–2 | 2–0 | 4–3 | 6–3 | 3–2 | 1–1 | 0–1 | 4–1 | 1–0 | 2–2 | | 0–1 |
| Zürich | 1–1 | 2–0 | 0–1 | 1–2 | 3–1 | 4–0 | 0–0 | 1–1 | 3–2 | 1–2 | 5–3 | 0–0 | 2–0 | |

Source: rsssf.com
Legend: Blue = home team win; Yellow = draw; Red = away team win.

== Attendances ==
| # | Club | Average |
|---|---|---|
| 1 | Basel | 13,154 |
| 2 | Young Boys | 8,123 |
| 3 | Zürich | 7,308 |
| 4 | Lausanne | 6,938 |
| 5 | St. Gallen | 6,423 |
| 6 | GCZ | 6,015 |
| 7 | Chiasso | 5,892 |
| 8 | Sion | 5,631 |
| 9 | Fribourg | 5,600 |
| 10 | Lugano | 4,923 |
| 11 | Servette | 4,462 |
| 12 | Grenchen | 3,854 |
| 13 | La Chaux-de-Fonds | 3,377 |
| 14 | Winterthur | 3,131 |

== Nationalliga B ==
=== Teams, locations ===
| Team | Town | Canton | Stadium | Capacity |
|---|---|---|---|---|
| FC Aarau | Aarau | Aargau | Stadion Brügglifeld | 9,240 |
| AC Bellinzona | Bellinzona | Ticino | Stadio Comunale Bellinzona | 5,000 |
| FC Biel-Bienne | Biel/Bienne | Bern | Stadion Gurzelen | 15,000 |
| SC Brühl | St. Gallen | St. Gallen | Paul-Grüninger-Stadion | 4,200 |
| SC Buochs | Buochs | Nidwalden | Stadion Seefeld | 5,000 |
| CS Chênois | Thônex | Geneva | Stade des Trois-Chêne | 8,000 |
| Étoile Carouge FC | Carouge | Geneva | Stade de la Fontenette | 3,690 |
| FC Luzern | Lucerne | Lucerne | Stadion Allmend | 25,000 |
| FC Martigny-Sports | Martigny | Valais | Stade d'Octodure | 2,500 |
| Mendrisiostar | Mendrisio | Ticino | Centro Sportivo Comunale | 4,000 |
| Vevey-Sports | Vevey | Vaud | Stade de Copet | 4,000 |
| FC Wettingen | Wettingen | Aargau | Stadion Altenburg | 10,000 |
| Xamax | Neuchâtel | Neuchâtel | Stade de la Maladière | 25,500 |
| FC Young Fellows Zürich | Zürich | Zürich | Utogrund | 2,850 |

=== Final league table ===
| Pos | Team | Pld | W | D | L | GF | GA | GD | Pts | Qualification |
|---|---|---|---|---|---|---|---|---|---|---|
| 1 | Xamax | 26 | 19 | 5 | 2 | 72 | 21 | +51 | 43 | NLB Champions and promoted to 1973–74 Nationalliga A |
| 2 | CS Chênois | 26 | 15 | 7 | 4 | 44 | 24 | +20 | 37 | To promotion play-off |
| 3 | Luzern | 26 | 15 | 7 | 4 | 60 | 26 | +34 | 37 | To promotion play-off |
| 4 | FC Biel-Bienne | 26 | 11 | 6 | 9 | 45 | 35 | +10 | 28 | |
| 5 | Vevey-Sports | 26 | 11 | 5 | 10 | 50 | 40 | +10 | 27 | |
| 6 | Mendrisiostar | 26 | 9 | 9 | 8 | 30 | 34 | −4 | 27 | |
| 7 | Young Fellows Zürich | 26 | 11 | 4 | 11 | 35 | 37 | −2 | 26 | |
| 8 | Etoile Carouge FC | 26 | 8 | 8 | 10 | 36 | 51 | −15 | 24 | |
| 9 | FC Wettingen | 26 | 8 | 7 | 11 | 30 | 44 | −14 | 23 | |
| 10 | FC Aarau | 26 | 7 | 8 | 11 | 29 | 42 | −13 | 22 | |
| 11 | FC Martigny-Sports | 26 | 6 | 9 | 11 | 27 | 45 | −18 | 21 | |
| 12 | AC Bellinzona | 26 | 7 | 6 | 13 | 30 | 41 | −11 | 20 | |
| 13 | SC Brühl | 26 | 6 | 6 | 14 | 43 | 58 | −15 | 18 | Relegated to 1973–74 1. Liga |
| 14 | SC Buochs | 26 | 3 | 5 | 18 | 26 | 59 | −33 | 11 | Relegated to 1973–74 1. Liga |

Source: rsssf.com
Rules for classification: 1) Points; 2) Goal difference within the league, however with play-off for qualifiers;

=== Decider for second place ===
The decider match for second place was played on

| Team 1 | Score | Team 2 |
|---|---|---|
| CS Chênois | 2–1 (a.e.t.) | Luzern |

CS Chênois won and were promoted to 1973–74 Nationalliga A. Luzern remain in the division.

== Further in Swiss football ==
- 1972–73 Swiss Cup
- 1972–73 Swiss 1. Liga

== Sources ==
- Switzerland 1972–73 at RSSSF
- Josef Zindel (2018). FC Basel 1893. Die ersten 125 Jahre (in German). Basel: Friedrich Reinhardt Verlag. ISBN 978-3-7245-2305-5.

| Preceded by 1971–72 | Nationalliga seasons in Switzerland | Succeeded by 1973–74 |
