= 1969–70 Nationalliga A =

Swiss football season

Nationalliga A
- Season: 1969–70
- Champions: Basel
- Relegated: Wettingen; St. Gallen
- Top goalscorer: Fritz Künzli (Zürich); 19 goals

Nationalliga B
- Season: 1969–70
- Champions: Sion
- Promoted: Sion; Luzern
- Relegated: Thun; FC Langenthal
- Top goalscorer: Hans-Jürgen Ferdinand (Chiasso); 24 goals

The following is the summary of the Swiss National League in the 1969–70 football season, both Nationalliga A and Nationalliga B. This was the 73rd season of top-tier and the 72nd season of second-tier football in Switzerland.

== Overview ==
The Swiss Football Association (ASF/SFV) had 28 member clubs at this time which were divided into two divisions of 14 teams each. The teams played a double round-robin to decide their table positions. Two points were awarded for a win, and one point was awarded for a draw. The top tier (NLA) was contested by the top 12 teams from the previous 1968–69 season and the two newly promoted teams FC Wettingen and FC Fribourg. The champions would qualify for the 1970–71 European Cup and the last two teams in the league table at the end of the season were to be relegated.

The second-tier (NLB) was contested by the two teams that had been relegated from the NLA, Sion and Luzern, the teams that had been in third to twelfth position last season and the two newly promoted teams FC Martigny-Sports and FC Langenthal. The top two teams at the end of the season would be promoted to the 1970–71 NLA and the two last placed teams would be relegated to the 1970–71 Swiss 1. Liga.

== Nationalliga A ==
=== Teams, locations ===
Team	Based in	Canton	Stadium	Capacity
FC Basel	Basel	Basel-Stadt	St. Jakob Stadium	36,800
AC Bellinzona	Bellinzona	Ticino	Stadio Comunale Bellinzona	5,000
FC Biel-Bienne	Biel/Bienne	Bern	Stadion Gurzelen	15,000
FC Fribourg	Fribourg	Fribourg	Stade Universitaire	9,000
Grasshopper Club Zürich	Zürich	Zürich	Hardturm	20,000
FC La Chaux-de-Fonds	La Chaux-de-Fonds	Neuchâtel	Centre Sportif de la Charrière	12,700
FC Lausanne-Sport	Lausanne	Vaud	Pontaise	15,700
FC Lugano	Lugano	Ticino	Cornaredo Stadium	6,330
Servette FC	Geneva	Geneva	Stade des Charmilles	27,000
FC St. Gallen	St. Gallen	St. Gallen	Espenmoos	11,000
FC Wettingen	Wettingen	Aargau	Stadion Altenburg	10,000
FC Winterthur	Winterthur	Zürich	Schützenwiese	8,550
BSC Young Boys	Bern	Bern	Wankdorf Stadium	56,000
FC Zürich	Zürich	Zürich	Letzigrund	25,000

=== Final league table ===
Pos	Team	Pld	W	D	L	GF	GA	GD	Pts	Qualification
1	Basel	26	15	7	4	59	23	+36	37	Swiss Champions, qualified for 1970–71 European Cup
2	Lausanne-Sport	26	12	12	2	54	36	+18	36	Entered 1970–71 Inter-Cities Fairs Cup
3	Zürich	26	15	4	7	49	29	+20	34	Swiss Cup winners, qualified for 1970–71 Cup Winners' Cup
4	Grasshopper Club	26	12	7	7	39	24	+15	31	Entered 1970–71 Inter-Cities Fairs Cup
5	Young Boys	26	13	5	8	52	41	+11	31	
6	Lugano	26	10	10	6	43	37	+6	30	
7	Servette	26	10	9	7	53	37	+16	29	Entered 1970 Intertoto Cup
8	Winterthur	26	11	5	10	50	41	+9	27	Entered 1970 Intertoto Cup
9	La Chaux-de-Fonds	26	9	3	14	36	55	−19	21	
10	Bellinzona	26	6	8	12	26	43	−17	20	
11	Fribourg	26	7	5	14	27	37	−10	19	
12	Biel-Bienne	26	7	5	14	28	55	−27	19	
13	Wettingen	26	6	3	17	33	62	−29	15	Relegated to 1970–71 Nationalliga B
14	St. Gallen	26	6	3	17	28	57	−29	15	Relegated to 1970–71 Nationalliga B

Source: rsssf.com
Rules for classification: 1) Points; 2) Goal difference within the league, however with play-off for qualifiers;

=== Results ===
Home \ Away	BAS	BEL	BB	CDF	FRI	GCZ	LS	LUG	SER	STG	WET	WIN	YB	ZÜR
Basel		2–0	5–1	3–2	3–0	0–0	1–1	4–0	2–2	2–1	6–2	4–0	3–1	1–1
Bellinzona	0–4		0–0	0–0	1–0	2–2	0–0	1–0	0–3	2–1	1–1	1–1	3–2	2–0
Biel-Bienne	1–4	2–2		1–2	3–1	1–0	0–5	2–3	0–2	4–1	0–0	1–0	2–0	0–1
Chaux-de-Fonds	0–0	1–2	2–0		3–1	2–1	1–2	3–5	1–0	2–1	3–1	0–3	4–3	2–4
Fribourg	0–0	2–1	0–1	3–0		0–0	1–1	2–1	2–3	1–2	2–0	1–1	0–3	1–2
Grasshopper	2–0	3–2	3–3	3–0	1–0		1–2	0–0	1–0	2–0	0–3	4–1	1–2	3–1
Lausanne-Sport	1–1	2–1	7–0	2–0	2–1	1–1		1–1	3–3	2–2	4–2	1–0	2–1	2–2
Lugano	2–1	1–0	1–1	5–2	1–1	1–3	2–2		1–1	1–1	4–0	2–1	1–1	2–0
Servette	1–2	1–1	5–1	3–2	0–1	1–1	6–2	1–1		2–1	3–1	2–3	3–3	0–1
St. Gallen	1–4	2–0	3–1	0–1	3–2	0–2	1–2	1–3	2–2		3–2	1–5	0–1	1–0
Wettingen	0–5	3–2	0–1	3–0	0–1	0–2	0–1	2–0	0–6	1–0		1–1	4–0	1–2
Winterthur	2–0	3–1	4–1	3–2	2–3	1–0	3–3	0–2	0–2	4–0	6–0		1–2	3–2
Young Boys	2–1	4–1	2–1	0–0	2–1	1–0	3–3	2–2	4–0	2–0	6–4	4–1		1–2
Zürich	0–1	3–0	2–0	6–1	1–0	0–3	2–0	4–1	1–1	7–0	3–2	1–1	1–0	

Source: rsssf.com
Legend: Blue = home team win; Yellow = draw; Red = away team win.

== Nationalliga B ==
=== Teams, locations ===
Team	Based in	Canton	Stadium	Capacity
FC Aarau	Aarau	Aargau	Stadion Brügglifeld	9,240
SC Brühl	St. Gallen	St. Gallen	Paul-Grüninger-Stadion	4,200
FC Chiasso	Chiasso	Ticino	Stadio Comunale Riva IV	4,000
Étoile Carouge FC	Carouge	Geneva	Stade de la Fontenette	3,690
FC Grenchen	Grenchen	Solothurn	Stadium Brühl	15,100
FC Langenthal	Langenthal	Bern	Rankmatte	2,000
Luzern	Lucerne	Lucerne	Stadion Allmend	25,000
FC Martigny-Sports	Martigny	Valais	Stade d'Octodure	2,500
Mendrisiostar	Mendrisio	Ticino	Centro Sportivo Comunale	4,000
FC Sion	Sion	Valais	Stade de Tourbillon	16,000
FC Thun	Thun	Bern	Stadion Lachen	10,350
Urania Genève Sport	Genève	Geneva	Stade de Frontenex	4,000
Neuchâtel Xamax FC	Neuchâtel	Neuchâtel	Stade de la Maladière	25,500
FC Young Fellows Zürich	Zürich	Zürich	Utogrund	2,850

=== Final league table ===
Pos	Team	Pld	W	D	L	GF	GA	GD	Pts	Qualification
1	FC Sion	26	14	9	3	62	27	+35	37	NLB Champions and promoted to 1970–71 Nationalliga A
2	FC Luzern	26	15	5	6	58	39	+19	35	Promoted to 1970–71 Nationalliga A
3	FC Grenchen	26	13	6	7	49	28	+21	32	
4	Mendrisiostar	26	8	13	5	41	25	+16	29	
5	Young Fellows	26	10	8	8	42	31	+11	28	
6	FC Xamax	26	11	6	9	48	45	+3	28	
7	FC Chiasso	26	10	6	10	37	35	+2	26	
8	SC Brühl	26	8	10	8	34	38	−4	26	
9	Etoile Carouge FC	26	9	6	11	43	47	−4	24	
10	FC Aarau	26	9	6	11	22	26	−4	24	
11	Urania Genève Sport	26	7	9	10	37	41	−4	23	
12	FC Martigny-Sports	26	9	5	12	26	46	−20	23	
13	FC Thun	26	3	12	11	25	45	−20	18	Relegated to 1970–71 1. Liga
14	FC Langenthal	26	3	5	18	25	76	−51	11	Relegated to 1970–71 1. Liga

Source: rsssf.com
Rules for classification: 1) Points; 2) Goal difference within the league, however with play-off for qualifiers;

== Top scorers ==
Player	Nationality	Goals	Club
Fritz Künzli	Switzerland	19	Zürich
Walter Müller	Switzerland	17	Young Boys
Rolf Blättler	Switzerland	14	Lugano
Timo Konietzka	Germany	14	Winterthur
Helmut Hauser	Germany	14	Basel
Herbert Dimmeler	Switzerland	13	Winterthur
Otto Luttrop	Germany	13	Lugano
Georges Vuilleumier	Switzerland	13	Lausanne-Sport
Walter Balmer	Switzerland	12	Basel
Pierre Kerkhoffs	Netherlands	12	Lausanne-Sport
Franz Meier	Switzerland	12	Wettingen

== Further in Swiss football ==
- 1969–70 Swiss Cup
- 1969–70 Swiss 1. Liga

== Sources ==
- Switzerland 1969–70 at RSSSF

Preceded by 1968–69	Nationalliga seasons in Switzerland	Succeeded by 1970–71
