= 1972–73 Swiss 1. Liga =

1. Liga
- Season: 1972–73
- Champions: 1. Liga champions: FC Nordstern Basel; Group West: FC Monthey; Group Cenral: FC Nordstern Basel; Group South and East: FC Tössfeld
- Promoted: FC Nordstern Basel; FC Tössfeld
- Relegated: Group West: FC Fontainemelon; FC Renens; Group Central: FC Turgi; FC Breite Basel; Group South and East: FC Vaduz; AS Gambarogno
- Matches: 3 times 156 and 1 decider plus 9 play-offs

The 1972–73 1. Liga was the 41st season of this league since its creation in 1931. At this time, the 1. Liga was the third tier of the Swiss football league system and it was the highest level of amateur football.

== Format ==
There were 39 clubs in the 1. Liga. These were divided into three regional groups, each with 13 teams. Within each group, the teams would play a double round-robin to decide their league position. Two points were awarded for a win. The three group winners and the runners-up contested a play-off round to decide the two promotion slots. The last two placed teams in each group were directly relegated to the 2. Liga (fourth tier).

== Group West ==
=== Teams ===
Club	Canton	Stadium	Capacity
ASI Audax-Friul	Neuchâtel	Pierre-à-Bot	1,700
FC Central Fribourg	Fribourg	Guintzet	2,000
FC Dürrenast	Bern	Stadion Lachen	13,500
FC Fontainemelon	Neuchâtel	Centre Sportif Fontainemelon	1,000
FC Le Locle	Neuchâtel	Installation sportive - Jeanneret	3,142
FC Meyrin	Geneva	Stade des Arbères	9,000
FC Monthey	Valais	Stade Philippe Pottier	1,800
FC Raron	Valais	Sportplatz Rhoneglut	1,000
FC Renens	Waadt	Zone sportive du Censuy	2,300
FC Stade Nyonnais	Vaud	Stade de Colovray	7,200
FC Thun	Bern	Stadion Lachen	10,350
Urania Genève Sport	Geneva	Stade de Frontenex	4,000
Yverdon-Sport FC	Vaud	Stade Municipal	6,600

=== Final league table ===
Pos	Team	Pld	W	D	L	GF	GA	GD	Pts	Qualification or relegation
1	FC Monthey	24	13	7	4	48	21	+27	33	Play-off to Nationalliga B
2	FC Dürrenast	24	11	8	5	43	31	+12	30	Play-off to Nationalliga B
3	FC Raron	24	11	5	8	42	36	+6	27	
4	FC Stade Nyonnais	24	11	4	9	43	31	+12	26	
5	FC Le Locle	24	9	7	8	43	38	+5	25	
6	Yverdon-Sport FC	24	10	5	9	35	38	−3	25	
7	FC Meyrin	24	9	7	8	26	33	−7	25	
8	Central Fribourg	24	10	4	10	45	43	+2	24	
9	FC Thun	24	10	4	10	35	46	−11	24	
10	Urania Genève Sport	24	7	9	8	34	37	−3	23	
11	ASI Audax-Friul	24	8	4	12	35	41	−6	20	
12	FC Fontainemelon	24	5	6	13	33	47	−14	16	Relegation to 2. Liga Interregional
13	FC Renens	24	3	8	13	27	47	−20	14	Relegation to 2. Liga Interregional

Source: RSSSF
Rules for classification: 1) Points; 2) Goal difference within the league, but decider play-off for qualifiers; 3) Goals scored; 4) Head-to-head points; 5) Away goals scored; 6) Draw.

== Group Central ==
=== Teams ===
Club	Canton	Stadium	Capacity
FC Baden	Aargau	Esp Stadium	7,000
FC Bern	Bern	Stadion Neufeld	14,000
FC Breite Basel	Basel-City	Stadion Schützenmatte / Landhof	8,000 / 7,000
FC Concordia Basel	Basel-City	Stadion Rankhof	7,000
SR Delémont	Jura	La Blancherie	5,263
FC Emmenbrücke	Lucerne	Stadion Gersag	8,700
SC Kriens	Lucerne	Stadion Kleinfeld	5,100
FC Laufen	Basel-Country	Sportplatz Nau	3,000
FC Moutier	Bern	Stade de Chalière	5,000
FC Nordstern Basel	Basel-Stadt	Rankhof	7,600
FC Porrentruy	Jura	Stade du Tirage	4,226
FC Solothurn	Solothurn	Stadion FC Solothurn	6,750
FC Turgi	Aargau	Sportanlage Oberau	1,000

=== Final league table ===
Pos	Team	Pld	W	D	L	GF	GA	GD	Pts	Qualification or relegation
1	FC Nordstern Basel	24	16	3	5	44	22	+22	35	Play-off to Nationalliga B
2	SR Delémont	24	13	4	7	41	29	+12	30	Play-off to Nationalliga B
3	SC Kriens	24	11	7	6	46	32	+14	29	
4	FC Solothurn	24	8	11	5	39	33	+6	27	
5	FC Bern	24	8	9	7	47	47	0	25	
6	FC Baden	24	9	6	9	31	35	−4	24	
7	FC Porrentruy	24	9	6	9	29	34	−5	24	
8	FC Moutier	24	7	9	8	46	39	+7	23	
9	FC Emmenbrücke	24	9	4	11	42	40	+2	22	
10	FC Laufen	24	8	6	10	37	40	−3	22	
11	FC Concordia Basel	24	7	4	13	37	52	−15	18	Play-out against relegation
12	FC Turgi	24	5	8	11	27	43	−16	18	Play-out against relegation
13	FC Breite Basel	24	5	5	14	33	53	−20	15	Relegation to 2. Liga Interregional

Source: RSSSF
Rules for classification: 1) Points; 2) Goal difference within the league, but decider play-off for qualifiers; 3) Goals scored; 4) Head-to-head points; 5) Away goals scored; 6) Draw.

=== Decider for eleventh place ===
The decider was played on 3 June in Solothurn.

Team 1	Score	Team 2
FC Concordia Basel	2–2 a.e.t.	FC Turgi

The game was drawn, however, at this period in time, the extra-time as match extension had not yet been introduced. FC Concordia Basel were declaired winners due to the better goal-average of the regular season and, therefore, they remained in the division. FC Turgi were relegated to 2. Liga Interregional.

== Group South and East ==
=== Teams ===
Club	Canton	Stadium	Capacity
FC Blue Stars Zürich	Zürich	Hardhof	1,000
FC Chur	Grisons	Ringstrasse	2,820
FC Frauenfeld	Thurgau	Kleine Allmend	6,370
AS Gambarogno	Ticino	Centro Sportivo Regionale Magadino	1,100
US Giubiasco	Ticino	Campo Semine	1,000
FC Gossau	St. Gallen	Sportanlage Buechenwald	3,500
FC Locarno	Locarno, Ticino	Stadio comunale Lido	5,000
FC Rapid Lugano	Ticino	Cornaredo Stadium	6,330
FC Red Star Zürich	Zürich	Allmend Brunau	2,000
FC Tössfeld	Zürich	Talgut	1,000
FC Uzwil	St. Gallen	Rüti	1,000
FC Vaduz	Liechtenstein	Rheinpark Stadion	7,584
SC Zug	Zug	Herti Allmend Stadion	6,000

=== Final league table ===
Pos	Team	Pld	W	D	L	GF	GA	GD	Pts	Qualification or relegation
1	FC Tössfeld	24	13	8	3	45	22	+23	34	Play-off to Nationalliga B
2	SC Zug	24	12	5	7	39	33	+6	29	Play-off to Nationalliga B
3	FC Locarno	24	9	9	6	41	27	+14	27	
4	FC Blue Stars Zürich	24	9	8	7	34	22	+12	26	
5	FC Uzwil	24	9	7	8	36	39	−3	25	
6	FC Gossau	24	9	6	9	35	34	+1	24	
7	FC Red Star Zürich	24	7	8	9	28	28	0	22	
8	US Giubiasco	24	6	10	8	21	28	−7	22	
9	FC Frauenfeld	24	7	8	9	32	40	−8	22	
10	FC Chur	24	6	9	9	27	36	−9	21	
11	FC Rapid Lugano	24	7	7	10	30	41	−11	21	
12	FC Vaduz	24	7	6	11	38	44	−6	20	Relegation to 2. Liga Interregional
13	AS Gambarogno	24	6	7	11	31	43	−12	19	Relegation to 2. Liga Interregional

Source: RSSSF (which contains a mistake by SC Zug, number of wins +1, number of draws -1, but points are correctly stated)
Rules for classification: 1) Points; 2) Goal difference within the league, but decider play-off for qualifiers; 3) Goals scored; 4) Head-to-head points; 5) Away goals scored; 6) Draw.

== Promotion play-off ==
The three group winners played a two legged tie against one of the runners-up to decide the three finalists. The games were played on 3 and 10 June.

=== Qualification round ===
Team 1	Score	Team 2
FC Nordstern Basel	3–3	SC Zug
SC Zug	0–6	FC Nordstern Basel

FC Nordstern Basel win 9–3 on aggregate and continue to the finals.

Team 1	Score	Team 2
FC Tössfeld	5–1	FC Dürrenast
FC Dürrenast	3–1	FC Tössfeld

FC Tössfeld win 6–4 on aggregate and continue to the finals.

Team 1	Score	Team 2
FC Monthey	0–1	SR Delémont
SR Delémont	3–1	FC Monthey

SR Delémont win 4–1 on aggregate and continue to the finals.

=== Final round ===
The three first round winners competed in a single round-robin to decide the two promotion slots. The games were played on 17, 24 June and 1 July.

Pos	Team	Pld	W	D	L	GF	GA	GD	Pts	NOR	TÖS	DEL
1	FC Nordstern Basel	2	1	0	1	2	1	+1	2	—	2–0	—
2	FC Tössfeld	2	1	0	1	3	2	+1	2	—	—	3–0
3	SR Delémont	2	1	0	1	1	3	−2	2	1–0	—	—

Source: RSSSF

FC Nordstern Basel are champions, because they beat Tössfeld in the head-to-head and Tössfeld are runners-up. These two teams are promoted.

== Further in Swiss football ==
- 1972–73 Nationalliga A
- 1972–73 Nationalliga B
- 1972–73 Swiss Cup

== Sources ==
- Switzerland 1972–73 at RSSSF

Preceded by 1971–72	Seasons in Swiss 1. Liga	Succeeded by 1973–74
