= 1971–72 Nationalliga A =

Swiss football season

Nationalliga A
- Season: 1971–72
- Champions: Basel
- Relegated: Luzern; Biel-Bienne
- Top goalscorer: Herbert Dimmeler (Winterthur) and Bernd Dörfel (Servette) both 17 goals

Nationalliga B
- Season: 1971–72
- Champions: Chiasso
- Promoted: Chiasso; FC Fribourg
- Relegated: FC Monthey; AS Gambarogno
- Top goalscorer: Jean-Robert Rub (Xamax); 20 goals

The following is the summary of the Swiss National League in the 1971–72 football season, both Nationalliga A and Nationalliga B. This was the 75th season of top-tier and the 74th season of second-tier football in Switzerland.

== Overview ==
The Swiss Football Association (ASF/SFV) had 28 member clubs at this time which were divided into two divisions of 14 teams each. The teams played a double round-robin to decide their table positions. Two points were awarded for a win, and one point was awarded for a draw. The top tier (NLA) was contested by the top 12 teams from the previous season and the two newly promoted teams St. Gallen and FC Grenchen. This season's champions would qualify for the 1972–73 European Cup. The second and third placed teams were to be qualified for the 1972–73 UEFA Cup, but because second placed Zürich won the 1971–72 Swiss Cup, these UEFA rights were passed down to the third and fourth placed teams. The last two placed teams were to be relegated to the 1972–73 NLB.

The second-tier (NLB) was contested by the two teams that had been relegated from the NLA, Bellinzona and Fribourg, the teams that had been in third to twelfth position last season and the two newly promoted teams CS Chênois and AS Gambarogno. The top two teams at the end of the season would be promoted to the 1972–73 NLA and the last two teams would be relegated to the 1972–73 Swiss 1. Liga.

== Nationalliga A ==
The first round of the NLA was played on 14 August 1971. After playing 13 rounds, completed on 12 December, there was a winter break until the 14th round was held on 5 March 1972. The season had 26 rounds and was completed on 10 June 1972.

=== Teams, locations ===
Team	Based in	Canton	Stadium	Capacity
FC Basel	Basel	Basel-Stadt	St. Jakob Stadium	36,800
FC Biel-Bienne	Biel/Bienne	Bern	Stadion Gurzelen	15,000
Grasshopper Club Zürich	Zürich	Zürich	Hardturm	20,000
FC Grenchen	Grenchen	Solothurn	Stadium Brühl	15,100
FC La Chaux-de-Fonds	La Chaux-de-Fonds	Neuchâtel	Centre Sportif de la Charrière	12,700
FC Lausanne-Sport	Lausanne	Vaud	Pontaise	15,700
FC Lugano	Lugano	Ticino	Cornaredo Stadium	6,330
FC Luzern	Lucerne	Lucerne	Stadion Allmend	25,000
FC St. Gallen	St. Gallen	St. Gallen	Espenmoos	11,000
Servette FC	Geneva	Geneva	Stade des Charmilles	27,000
FC Sion	Sion	Valais	Stade de Tourbillon	16,000
FC Winterthur	Winterthur	Zürich	Schützenwiese	8,550
BSC Young Boys	Bern	Bern	Wankdorf Stadium	56,000
FC Zürich	Zürich	Zürich	Letzigrund	25,000

=== Final league table ===
Pos	Team	Pld	W	D	L	GF	GA	GD	Pts	Qualification
1	Basel	26	18	7	1	66	28	+38	43	Swiss champions, qualified for 1972–73 European Cup
2	Zürich	26	17	5	4	55	28	+27	39	Swiss Cup winners, qualified for 1972–73 Cup Winners' Cup and entered 1972 Intertoto Cup
3	Grasshopper Club	26	16	6	4	56	24	+32	38	Qualified for 1972–73 UEFA Cup and entered 1972 Intertoto Cup
4	Lausanne-Sport	26	11	8	7	50	36	+14	30	Qualified for 1972–73 UEFA Cup
5	Young Boys	26	12	5	9	46	31	+15	29	Entered 1972 Intertoto Cup
6	Winterthur	26	12	4	10	37	32	+5	28	Entered 1972 Intertoto Cup
7	Sion	26	9	8	9	37	36	+1	26	
8	Servette	26	10	5	11	39	47	−8	25	
9	Lugano	26	8	7	11	33	39	−6	23	
10	Grenchen	26	6	11	9	27	40	−13	23	
11	La Chaux-de-Fonds	26	7	7	12	25	45	−20	21	
12	St. Gallen	26	4	7	15	27	46	−19	15	To relegation play-out
13	Luzern	26	6	3	17	24	49	−25	15	To relegation play-out
14	Biel-Bienne	26	2	5	19	26	67	−41	9	Relegated to 1972–73 Nationalliga B

Source: rsssf.com
Rules for classification: 1) Points; 2) Goal difference within the league, however with play-off for qualifiers;

=== Relegation play out ===
The decider was played on 13 June 1972 at the Hardturm in Zürich.

Team 1	Score	Team 2
St. Gallen	4–1	Luzern

St. Gallen won and remained in the top-level. Luzern were relegated to 1972–73 Nationalliga B.

=== Results ===
Home \ Away	BAS	BB	CDF	GCZ	GRE	LS	LUG	LUZ	SER	SIO	STG	WIN	YB	ZÜR
Basel		6–2	6–2	2–1	0–0	1–1	3–1	1–0	5–1	3–0	3–0	2–1	1–1	4–0
Biel-Bienne	1–2		2–2	1–2	2–2	1–5	1–3	0–1	0–2	2–4	2–1	1–3	0–3	1–4
La Chaux-de-Fonds	1–3	1–2		1–2	0–0	2–1	0–2	3–2	1–1	2–0	1–0	1–1	1–0	0–2
Grasshopper Club	1–2	1–1	5–0		4–0	4–1	2–0	3–0	3–1	0–0	2–0	3–0	1–1	1–2
Grenchen	0–2	1–1	1–0	0–2		3–2	1–1	1–0	2–2	0–1	2–1	2–2	3–3	1–1
Lausanne-Sports	1–1	4–0	1–1	3–3	2–1		2–0	4–1	1–2	0–2	1–1	3–2	3–1	2–0
Lugano	0–3	2–2	0–1	1–2	3–1	3–1		1–1	3–0	2–2	3–3	0–0	1–0	1–3
Luzern	1–2	2–1	2–0	2–1	0–1	0–2	0–1		2–2	0–3	2–0	0–2	1–2	0–4
Servette	0–2	2–1	3–0	2–2	1–2	1–0	3–1	3–0		4–0	3–2	0–3	2–1	1–2
Sion	3–3	4–1	2–2	1–2	1–1	2–1	3–2	2–2	1–0		3–1	0–1	0–1	1–1
St. Gallen	1–1	1–0	1–2	1–4	0–0	0–1	2–0	3–0	2–2	1–1		0–1	2–1	1–4
Winterthur	2–4	2–0	1–1	0–2	3–0	0–3	3–1	2–1	2–0	1–0	3–1		1–3	0–1
Young Boys	4–1	3–0	1–0	1–2	3–1	2–2	0–0	2–3	6–0	1–0	3–1	2–1		0–2
Zürich	3–3	4–1	4–0	1–1	3–1	2–3	0–1	3–1	3–1	2–1	1–1	1–0	2–1	

Source: rsssf.com
Legend: Blue = home team win; Yellow = draw; Red = away team win.

== Attendances ==
#	Club	Average attendance	Highest attendance
1	Basel	18,769	56,000
2	Young Boys	10,131	22,500
3	Zürich	9,662	32,000
4	Lausanne	7,885	18,000
5	GCZ	7,323	29,500
6	Luzern	6,582	15,000
7	Grenchen	5,731	10,500
8	Servette	5,723	13,000
9	Sion	5,492	9,500
10	St. Gallen	5,431	9,600
11	Winterthur	4,769	10,500
12	Biel-Bienne	4,038	8,500
13	La Chaux-de-Fonds	3,385	8,000
14	Lugano	3,054	8,000

== Nationalliga B ==
=== Teams, locations ===
Team	Based in	Canton	Stadium	Capacity
FC Aarau	Aarau	Aargau	Stadion Brügglifeld	9,240
AC Bellinzona	Bellinzona	Ticino	Stadio Comunale Bellinzona	5,000
SC Brühl	St. Gallen	St. Gallen	Paul-Grüninger-Stadion	4,200
CS Chênois	Thônex	Geneva	Stade des Trois-Chêne	8,000
FC Chiasso	Chiasso	Ticino	Stadio Comunale Riva IV	4,000
Étoile Carouge FC	Carouge	Geneva	Stade de la Fontenette	3,690
FC Fribourg	Fribourg	Fribourg	Stade Universitaire	9,000
AS Gambarogno	Gambarogno	Ticino	Centro Sportivo Regionale Magadino	1,100
FC Martigny-Sports	Martigny	Valais	Stade d'Octodure	2,500
Mendrisiostar	Mendrisio	Ticino	Centro Sportivo Comunale	4,000
FC Monthey	Monthey	Valais	Stade Philippe Pottier	1,800
Vevey-Sports	Vevey	Vaud	Stade de Copet	4,000
FC Wettingen	Wettingen	Aargau	Stadion Altenburg	10,000
FC Xamax	Neuchâtel	Neuchâtel	Stade de la Maladière	25,500

=== Final league table ===
Pos	Team	Pld	W	D	L	GF	GA	GD	Pts	Qualification
1	FC Chiasso	26	17	3	6	45	25	+20	37	NLB Champions and promoted to 1972–73 Nationalliga A
2	FC Fribourg	26	15	4	7	41	22	+19	34	Promoted to 1972–73 Nationalliga A
3	FC Xamax	26	12	9	5	59	41	+18	33	
4	Vevey-Sports	26	12	8	6	44	39	+5	32	
5	FC Martigny-Sports	26	9	10	7	46	37	+9	28	
6	AC Bellinzona	26	10	6	10	48	39	+9	26	
7	Mendrisiostar	26	8	10	8	36	30	+6	26	
8	FC Wettingen	26	9	7	10	34	42	−8	25	
9	CS Chênois	26	10	5	11	39	54	−15	25	
10	FC Aarau	26	8	7	11	32	31	+1	23	
11	Etoile Carouge FC	26	6	11	9	31	34	−3	23	
12	SC Brühl	26	7	8	11	35	49	−14	22	
13	FC Monthey	26	7	7	12	35	49	−14	21	Relegated to 1972–73 1. Liga
14	AS Gambarogno	26	0	9	17	21	54	−33	9	Relegated to 1972–73 1. Liga

Source: rsssf.com
Rules for classification: 1) Points; 2) Goal difference within the league, however with play-off for qualifiers;

== Further in Swiss football ==
- 1971–72 Swiss Cup
- 1971–72 Swiss 1. Liga

== Sources ==
- Switzerland 1971–72 at RSSSF

Preceded by 1970–71	Nationalliga seasons in Switzerland	Succeeded by 1972–73
