= 1970–71 Nationalliga A =

Swiss football season

Nationalliga A
- Season: 1970–71
- Champions: Grasshopper Club
- Relegated: Fribourg; Bellinzona
- Top goalscorer: Walter Müller (Young Boys); 19 goals

Nationalliga B
- Season: 1970–71
- Champions: St. Gallen
- Promoted: St. Gallen; FC Grenchen
- Relegated: Young Fellows; Urania Genève
- Top goalscorer: Franz Meier (Wettingen); 20 goals

The following is the summary of the Swiss National League in the 1970–71 football season, both Nationalliga A and Nationalliga B. This was the 74th season of top-tier and the 73rd season of second-tier football in Switzerland.

== Overview ==
The Swiss Football Association (ASF/SFV) had 28 member clubs at this time which were divided into two divisions of 14 teams each. The teams played a double round-robin to decide their table positions. Two points were awarded for a win and one point was awarded for a draw. The top tier (NLA) was contested by the top 12 teams from the previous 1969–70 season and the two newly promoted teams Sion and Luzern. The champions would qualify for the 1971–72 European Cup, the second and third placed teams would qualify for the newly created 1971–72 UEFA Cup and the last two teams in the league table at the end of the season were to be relegated.

The second-tier (NLB) was contested by the two teams that had been relegated from the NLA, FC Wettingen and St. Gallen, the teams that had been in third to twelfth position last season and the two newly promoted teams Vevey-Sports and FC Monthey. The top two teams at the end of the season would be promoted to the 1971–72 NLA and the last two teams would be relegated to the 1971–72 Swiss 1. Liga.

At the end of the NLA season it came to an extraordinary situation, FC Basel finished the regular season level on points with Grasshopper Club Zürich and so these two teams had to contest a play-off game on 8 June 1971 to decide the championship title. Grasshopper won the play-off 4–3 after extra time. Bellinzona finished last in the table and were relegated. Sion and Fribourg, were level on points, both classes as second last, so they had to compete a play-out against relegation. Sion won 1–0 and remained in the top-tier and Fribourg were relegated.

== Nationalliga A ==
=== Teams, locations ===
Team	Based in	Canton	Stadium	Capacity
FC Basel	Basel	Basel-Stadt	St. Jakob Stadium	36,800
AC Bellinzona	Bellinzona	Ticino	Stadio Comunale Bellinzona	5,000
FC Biel-Bienne	Biel/Bienne	Bern	Stadion Gurzelen	15,000
FC Fribourg	Fribourg	Fribourg	Stade Universitaire	9,000
Grasshopper Club Zürich	Zürich	Zürich	Hardturm	20,000
FC La Chaux-de-Fonds	La Chaux-de-Fonds	Neuchâtel	Centre Sportif de la Charrière	12,700
FC Lausanne-Sport	Lausanne	Vaud	Pontaise	15,700
FC Lugano	Lugano	Ticino	Cornaredo Stadium	6,330
FC Luzern	Lucerne	Lucerne	Stadion Allmend	25,000
Servette FC	Geneva	Geneva	Stade des Charmilles	27,000
FC Sion	Sion	Valais	Stade de Tourbillon	16,000
FC Winterthur	Winterthur	Zürich	Schützenwiese	8,550
BSC Young Boys	Bern	Bern	Wankdorf Stadium	56,000
FC Zürich	Zürich	Zürich	Letzigrund	25,000

=== Final league table ===
Pos	Team	Pld	W	D	L	GF	GA	GD	Pts	Qualification or relegation
1	Basel	26	18	6	2	67	26	+41	42	To championship play-off
2	Grasshopper Club	26	20	2	4	59	21	+38	42	To championship play-off and entered 1971 Intertoto Cup
3	Lugano	26	11	9	6	50	34	+16	31	Qualified for 1971–72 UEFA Cup and entered 1971 Intertoto Cup
4	Lausanne-Sport	26	12	6	8	51	43	+8	30	
5	Zürich	26	11	6	9	41	42	−1	28	Entered 1971 Intertoto Cup
6	Winterthur	26	11	5	10	36	38	−2	27	
7	Servette	26	8	10	8	39	36	+3	26	Swiss Cup winners, qualified for 1971–72 Cup Winners' Cup and entered 1971 Intertoto Cup
8	Young Boys	26	10	6	10	43	46	−3	26	
9	La Chaux-de-Fonds	26	9	6	11	46	47	−1	24	
10	Biel-Bienne	26	6	9	11	32	43	−11	21	
11	Luzern	26	8	4	14	39	48	−9	20	
12	Sion	26	5	9	12	32	46	−14	19	To relegation play-off
13	Fribourg	26	6	7	13	35	63	−28	19	To relegation play-off
14	Bellinzona	26	1	7	18	24	61	−37	9	Relegated to 1971–72 Nationalliga B

Source: rsssf.com
Rules for classification: 1) Points; 2) Goal difference within the league, however with play-off for qualifiers;

=== Results ===
Home \ Away	BAS	BEL	BB	CDF	FRI	GCZ	LS	LUG	LUZ	SER	SIO	WIN	YB	ZÜR
Basel		5–2	2–0	2–0	3–0	3–1	5–3	4–1	5–0	2–2	2–0	5–0	3–2	4–2
Bellinzona	0–2		1–1	1–2	1–2	0–3	0–0	0–3	0–0	3–2	1–1	0–5	1–3	1–2
Biel-Bienne	1–1	2–1		2–1	0–3	0–3	1–4	3–2	2–1	2–2	1–1	1–1	4–0	0–1
La Chaux-de-Fonds	0–1	2–2	1–0		4–1	3–1	1–3	1–0	2–0	3–2	3–3	0–1	1–1	2–2
Fribourg	2–3	2–1	2–2	3–1		0–5	1–1	1–1	3–2	0–3	2–2	0–0	1–3	2–0
Grasshopper Club	2–1	1–0	2–1	3–1	10–1		1–0	2–1	2–0	1–2	3–0	2–1	2–1	1–2
Lausanne-Sports	2–2	3–1	1–0	3–2	4–2	1–3		0–0	1–0	2–2	3–1	4–0	1–0	5–0
Lugano	1–1	4–1	1–1	4–2	1–1	0–0	5–1		4–1	3–1	1–1	3–1	2–0	3–3
Luzern	1–1	4–0	1–2	4–3	3–1	0–2	4–1	3–2		3–1	0–2	0–2	1–2	3–3
Servette	1–1	3–1	2–2	2–2	2–0	0–1	1–0	1–0	2–1		1–1	1–1	2–2	2–0
Sion	0–1	2–2	1–1	2–4	2–0	1–1	5–1	1–2	0–2	2–1		2–1	1–3	0–1
Winterthur	2–1	2–1	2–0	2–1	4–3	1–2	1–1	1–2	3–1	1–0	3–0		0–0	0–1
Young Boys	1–6	3–3	2–1	1–3	4–1	0–1	3–1	3–3	1–3	1–1	3–1	2–0		2–1
Zürich	0–1	2–0	4–2	1–1	1–1	1–4	2–5	0–1	1–1	1–0	3–0	5–1	2–0	

Source: rsssf.com
Legend: Blue = home team win; Yellow = draw; Red = away team win.

=== Championship play-off ===
8 June 1971

Grasshopper Club	4–3 (a.e.t.)	Basel
Ohlhauser 16'; Grahn 75', 97'; Meier 106'	FCB summary	Mundschin 21'; Wenger 70'; Benthaus 119' (pen.)

Wankdorf, Bern
Attendance: 51,000
Referee: (Switzerland) Ulysse Darbellay Roche

Grasshopper Club were championship play-off winners and thus qualified for 1971–72 European Cup. As runners-up Basel qualified for 1971–72 UEFA Cup.

=== Relegation play-out ===
9 June 1971

Sion	1–0	Fribourg
Elsig 13'

Olympique de la Pontaise, Lausanne
Attendance: 20,000
Referee: (Switzerland) Pius Paul Kamber (Zürich)

Sion won the play-out and remained in the top-tier. Fribourg were relegated to 1971–72 Nationalliga B

== Nationalliga B ==
=== Teams, locations ===
Team	Based in	Canton	Stadium	Capacity
FC Aarau	Aarau	Aargau	Stadion Brügglifeld	9,240
SC Brühl	St. Gallen	St. Gallen	Paul-Grüninger-Stadion	4,200
FC Chiasso	Chiasso	Ticino	Stadio Comunale Riva IV	4,000
Étoile Carouge FC	Carouge	Geneva	Stade de la Fontenette	3,690
FC Grenchen	Grenchen	Solothurn	Stadium Brühl	15,100
FC Martigny-Sports	Martigny	Valais	Stade d'Octodure	2,500
Mendrisiostar	Mendrisio	Ticino	Centro Sportivo Comunale	4,000
FC Monthey	Monthey	Valais	Stade Philippe Pottier	1,800
FC St. Gallen	St. Gallen	St. Gallen	Espenmoos	11,000
Urania Genève Sport	Genève	Geneva	Stade de Frontenex	4,000
Vevey Sports	Vevey	Vaud	Stade de Copet	4,000
FC Wettingen	Wettingen	Aargau	Stadion Altenburg	10,000
Neuchâtel Xamax FC	Neuchâtel	Neuchâtel	Stade de la Maladière	25,500
FC Young Fellows Zürich	Zürich	Zürich	Utogrund	2,850

=== Final league table ===
Pos	Team	Pld	W	D	L	GF	GA	GD	Pts	Qualification
1	St. Gallen	26	18	5	3	55	24	+31	41	NLB Champions and promoted to 1971–72 Nationalliga A
2	FC Grenchen	26	18	3	5	53	21	+32	39	Promoted to 1971–72 Nationalliga A
3	Neuchâtel Xamax	26	13	5	8	46	32	+14	31	
4	Mendrisiostar	26	9	10	7	28	27	+1	28	
5	SC Brühl	26	11	5	10	45	42	+3	27	
6	FC Aarau	26	7	13	6	28	31	−3	27	
7	Etoile Carouge FC	26	9	8	9	43	43	0	26	
8	FC Monthey	26	9	7	10	44	42	+2	25	
9	FC Chiasso	26	6	11	9	24	36	−12	23	
10	FC Wettingen	26	8	6	12	47	48	−1	22	
11	Vevey-Sports	26	8	6	12	27	41	−14	22	
12	FC Martigny-Sports	26	8	6	12	26	42	−16	22	
13	Young Fellows	26	7	4	15	30	35	−5	18	Relegated to 1971–72 1. Liga
14	Urania Genève Sport	26	3	7	16	23	55	−32	13	Relegated to 1971–72 1. Liga

Source: rsssf.com
Rules for classification: 1) Points; 2) Goal difference within the league, however with play-off for qualifiers;

== Further in Swiss football ==
- 1970–71 Swiss Cup
- 1970–71 Swiss 1. Liga

== Sources ==
- Switzerland 1970–71 at RSSSF

Preceded by 1969–70	Nationalliga seasons in Switzerland	Succeeded by 1971–72
