= Kurt Grünig =

Swiss footballer (born 1944)

Personal information
- Date of birth: 13 March 1944 (age 82)
- Place of birth: Thun, Switzerland
- Position: Attacking midfielder

Senior career*
Years	Team	Apps	(Gls)
- FC Thun
- Young Boys
- St. Gallen
- FC Zürich
- FC Winterthur
- Young Fellows Zürich

International career
1964–1967	Switzerland	5	(2)
- * Club domestic league appearances and goals

Kurt Grünig (born 13 March 1944) is a Swiss footballer who played as an attacking midfielder. He made five appearances for the Switzerland national team from 1964 to 1967.
