= Esp Stadium =

Coordinates: 47.4458234°N 8.2963943°E

Esp Stadium is a stadium in Fislisbach, Switzerland. It is currently used for football matches and is the home ground of FC Baden. The stadium is situated a few kilometres outside of Baden in Canton Aargau. The capacity of the stadium is 7,000, of which 1,000 is seating and the rest is terracing.
