= Fritz Künzli =

Swiss footballer (1946–2019)

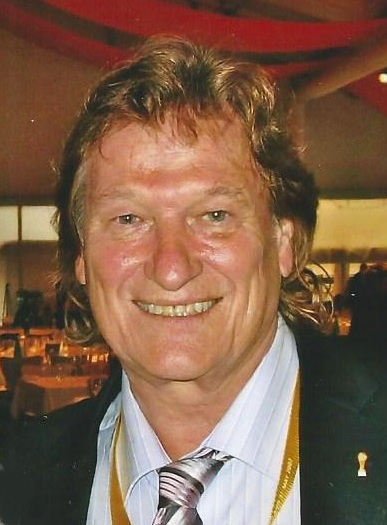

Personal information
- Full name: Friedrich Künzli
- Date of birth: 8 January 1946
- Place of birth: Glarus, Switzerland
- Date of death: 22 December 2019 (aged 73)
- Place of death: Zürich
- Position: Striker

Senior career*
Years	Team	Apps	(Gls)
1961–1964	FC Glarus		
1964–1973	FC Zürich	212	(157)
1973–1976	FC Winterthur	52	(14)
1976–1978	FC Lausanne-Sport	38	(26)
1978	San Diego Sockers	2	(1)
1978	Houston Hurricane	8	(2)
1978–1979	FC Lausanne-Sport	9	(3)

International career
1965–1977	Switzerland	44	(14)
- * Club domestic league appearances and goals

Friedrich "Fritz" Künzli (8 January 1946 – 22 December 2019) was a Swiss football player. From 1961 to 1979 he played in 313 matches in the Nationalliga A scoring a record 201 goals. In 1978, he played part of one season in the North American Soccer League.

== Career ==
He was a leading goal scorer four times in the league and is one of only three players to lead the league in goals for two different clubs. He achieved his greatest success teaming with Köbi Kuhn at FC Zürich, winning two league championships, and four Swiss Cups.

He earned 44 caps and scored 15 goals for Switzerland between 17 October 1965 and 16 November 1977. His international career includes two matches in the 1966 World Cup.

After retiring from football, he operated a restaurant in Zürich with his wife, former actress and model, Monika Kaelin. He died on 22 December 2019, having suffered from Alzheimer's disease in his later years.

== Honors ==
- 2x League champion 1965–1966, 1967–1968
- 4x League Leading Scorer, 1966–1967, 1967–1968, 1969–1970, 1977–1978
- 4x Swiss Cup champion 1966, 1970, 1972 and 1973
