= FC Dürrenast =

Swiss football club

- Full name: Football Club Dürrenast
- Founded: 1927
- Ground: Lachen
- Capacity: 10800
- Coach: Bruno Feller
- 2008/2009: 8th

FC Dürrenast is a football team from Thun, Switzerland. The team currently plays in the Bern/Jura regional competition of the Swiss football pyramid.
