= SC Buochs =

Swiss association football club

- Full name: Sportclub Buochs
- Founded: 1934; 92 years ago
- Ground: Stadion Seefeld
- Capacity: 5,000 (1,000 seats)
- Chairman: Heinz Fischer; Daniel Gasser
- Manager: Faras Pour Hayavi Zadeh
- League: 1. Liga Classic
- 2024–25: 2. Liga Interregional Group 3, 2nd of 16 (promoted)

SC Buochs is a Swiss football club based in Municipality of Buochs, Switzerland. They currently play in 1. Liga Classic, the fourth tier of Swiss football after promotion from 2. Liga Interregional in 2024–25. The club colours are blue and white derived from the town Buochs's coat of arms. The club was founded in 1934 (officially).

Their home ground is Stadion Seefeld, which has a proclaimed capacity of 5,000 (1,000 seats, 4,000 standing). However they have an average attendance of a couple hundred per home game (varying on significance) who turn up to watch their club play.

SC Buochs's greatest success was playing one season (1972/73) in the second tier of Swiss Football, at that time still National Liga B (NLB), which is now been renamed to the Challenge League.

== FC Avanti ==
FC Avanti was a football club located in the lakeside town of Buochs in Canton Nidwalden Switzerland. The club first started with the Name "FC Avanti" after World War I (1918–1919 estimated) but did not have the status of a proper football club. It was created by some football loving chaps after the First World War, however disappeared around 1924 to be replaced by the current team named SC Buochs in 1934 (officially).

== Founding of SC Buochs ==
In 1933 the first attempt was made to establish SC Buochs but it failed due to only nine people turning up which was insufficient to inaugurate the club. However, on 21 September 1934, thirteen 'Friends of Football' met up to commence this new football Club, SC Buochs.

== History of club ==
SC Buochs was initially an athletics club with the "SC" meaning sport club in German. SC Buochs started off in the lowest league in Switzerland called the "Serie C" playing against a small pool of amateur sides at first. As World War II started in 1939 the football was put to a standstill until 1941. A great number of the clubs did not have an actual football field during this time as many were used for the cultivation of field crops, subsequently resulting in clubs like Hergiswil using Buochs's facilities. This also resulted in these clubs having to withdraw which earned Buochs a promotion without actually being promoted to the 3 Liga.

== Buochs 1 ==
"Buochs 1" refers to SC Buochs first squad that currently play in the 1. Liga Classic which is one of the many fourth tiers in Swiss football. There have been a few exceptional players who have played for this 'petty' club in the 'heart of Switzerland', including Reto Zanni (currently playing for FC Basel), Selver Hodžić (who played in the champions league later with FC Thun) and Ryszard Komornicki (who played with Poland in the 1986 World Cup).

== Juniors ==
SC Buochs has a quality Junior program starting with the "football school" during spring, teaching the youngsters the fundamentals of shooting, technique, rules, endurance and comradeship before actually playing for the club. The club's youth program starts at F Juniors all the way up to A juniors and after that Buochs 1 or 2 and 3. Over the past years there have been some young and talented players who emerged from Buochs's youth system and have managed to play professionally or transferred to a professional club during the juniors and are still playing youth football. Reto Zanni who played for the Switzerland national under-21 football team and now plays for FC Basel and Christophe Lambert who currently plays for FC Luzern.

== Seefeld ==
SC Buochs's home ground is located by the Lake of Lucerne, consisting of three pitches (one of them being artificial, two natural grass), one main building for changing, storage, office and stands and a restaurant.
