= 1972–73 FC Basel season =

FC Basel
1972–73 season
- Chairman: Félix Musfeld
- Manager: Helmut Benthaus
- Ground: St. Jakob Stadium, Basel
- Nationalliga A: Champions
- Swiss Cup: Runner-up
- Swiss League Cup: Winners
- European Cup: Round 1
- Cup of the Alps: Group stage
- Top goalscorer: League: Ottmar Hitzfeld (18); All: Ottmar Hitzfeld (28)
- Highest home attendance: 28,000 on 14 April 1973 vs Grasshopper Club
- Lowest home attendance: 7,000 on 9 September 1972 vs Grenchen and on 19 May 1973 vs Chiasso
- Average home league attendance: 13,153

The 1972–73 season was Fussball Club Basel 1893's 79th season in their existence. It was their 27th consecutive season in the top flight of Swiss football after their promotion the season 1945–46. They played their home games in the St. Jakob Stadium. Félix Musfeld was the club's chairman for the third year in a row.

== Overview ==
=== Pre-season ===
The previous season was the last one as an active footballer for Helmut Benthaus. He ended his playing career, but continued with Basel as team manager. This was his eighth season as manager. There were only small amendments to the squad during the pre-season. Roland Paolucci was loaned out to Winterthur and Stefan Reisch left the team and moved on to Kickers Würzburg where he ended his active playing career. Basel did not transfer any players and Benthaus relied on young players who came up from the reserve team to help, when needed in the first team. Basel played a total of 55 matches during this season. 26 of these games were in the domestic league championship, seven of these games were in the Swiss Cup, four in the Swiss League Cup, two were in the European Cup, four were in the Cup of the Alps and 12 were friendly matches. Of these 12 test games four were won, four were drawn and four were lost. Three test matches were played at home in the St. Jakob Stadium and nine were played away.

=== Domestic league ===
14 teams contested in the 1972–73 Nationalliga A. These were the top 12 teams from the previous 1971–72 season and the two newly promoted teams Chiasso and Fribourg. The championship was played in a double round robin. The champions would qualify for the 1973–74 European Cup, the second and third placed teams were to qualify for 1973–74 UEFA Cup and the last two teams in the table at the end of the season were to be relegated. Basel started the league season badly, losing the first two games and drawing the next two. The first victory was recorded in the fifth round and during the next nine rounds Basel won eight games. After the winter break Basel were only defeated once. They won the championship four points ahead of Grasshopper Club and six ahead of the Sion. Basel won 17 of their 26 league games, drew five and lost four. They scored a total of 57 goals conceding 30. Ottmar Hitzfeld was the league's joint top goal scorer with Ove Grahn of Lausanne-Sports both with 18 league goals. Basels second top scorer was Walter Balmer who managed 11 league goals. The average attendance at the 13 league home matches was 13'153 spectators. The highest attendance was 28,000 on 14 April in the game against Grasshopper Club and the second highest attendance was 26,000 on 2 May against Zürich.

=== Swiss Cup and League Cup ===
In the Swiss Cup Basel played the round of 32 on 5 November 1972 at home to Martigny-Sports in the St. Jakob Stadium. The round of 16 match on 26 November 1972 was played away against BSC Young Boys and Basel left the Wankdorf Stadium with a 4–0 victory. The quarter-finals were two legged fixtures, the first leg played on 10 December 1972 in Stadio Comunale was won 2–0 against Chiasso and the second leg played one week later was won 5–3. The semi-finals were also two legged fixtures. Basel were matched against Biel-Bienne and won 6–1 on aggregate. Walter Balmer scored a hattrick in the home game. The final was played on 23 April 1973 in the Wankdorf Stadium against Zürich. The game ended goalless after 90 minutes. In extra time Peter Marti (92) and Fritz Künzli (101) scored the goals to give Zürich the title for the second consecutive time in a final against Basel.

The 1972 Swiss League Cup was the inaugural Swiss League Cup competition. It was played in the summer of 1972 as a pre-season tournament to the 1972–73 Swiss football season. Basel beat Servette 8–0, Lausanne Sports 2–1 aet and Sion 6–1 to reach the final. This was won by Basel who defeated FC Winterthur 4–1 in the final which took place on 11 November 1972 at the Letzigrund in Zürich. Ottmar Hitzfeld scored a hattrick in the final.

=== European Cup and Cup of the Alps ===
Basel were beaten by Újpesti Dózsa 2–0 in the first leg of the first round of the 1972–73 European Cup away from home in the Ferenc Szusza Stadium. The return match was on 27 September 1972 in St. Jakob Stadium. Basel won 3–2, the goals coming from René Hasler (65) and Walter Balmer (75 + 83), but they were beaten 4–3 on aggregate.

In the 1972 Cup of the Alps Basel played twice against Olympique Lyonnais, losing the away tie, winning at home game. They played twice against Bordeaux, winning the away game but losing the home game, but because Bordeaux won their other two games they continued to the final.

== Players ==
Note: Flags indicate national team as defined under FIFA eligibility rules; some limited exceptions apply. Players may hold more than one non-FIFA nationality.

| No. | Pos. | Nation | Player |
|---|---|---|---|
| 1 | GK | SUI | Marcel Kunz (league games: 16) |
| 2 | DF | SUI | Paul Fischli (league games: 18) |
| 3 | DF | SUI | Walter Mundschin (league games/goals: 26/5) |
| 4 | MF | SUI | Peter Ramseier (league games/goals: 24/5) |
| 5 | MF | SUI | Urs Siegenthaler (league games: 25) |
| 6 | MF | SUI | Otto Demarmels (league games/goals: 26/3) |
| 7 | FW | SUI | Walter Balmer (league games/goals: 25/11) |
| 8 | MF | SUI | Karl Odermatt (league games/goals: 22/3) |
| 9 | FW | SUI | Rolf Blättler (league games/goals: 7/2) |
| 10 | DF | SUI | René Hasler (league games/goals: 26/4) |
| 11 | FW | GER | Ottmar Hitzfeld (league games/goals: 21/18) |

| No. | Pos. | Nation | Player |
|---|---|---|---|
| 12 | MF | SUI | Bruno Rahmen (league games: 9) |
| 13 | DF | SUI | Jörg Stohler (league games/goals: 16/1) |
| — | GK | SUI | Urs Reto Grieshaber (reserves, league games: 1) |
| — | GK | FRA | Jean-Paul Laufenburger (league games 10) |
| — | GK | SUI | Hans Müller (league games: 1) |
| — | DF | GER | Josef Kiefer (league games: 7) |
| — | DF | SUI | Roland Paolucci (only Cup of the Alps) |
| — | DF | SUI | Alex Wirth (reserves, only Cup of the Alps) |
| — | MF | SUI | Heinz Schönebeck (league games: 0) |
| — | FW | SUI | Rolf Riner (league games: 5) |
| — | FW | SUI | Roger Ries (league games: 2) |
| — | FW | SUI | Peter Wenger (league games/goals: 19/4) |

Players who left the squad

Note: Flags indicate national team as defined under FIFA eligibility rules; some limited exceptions apply. Players may hold more than one non-FIFA nationality.

| No. | Pos. | Nation | Player |
|---|---|---|---|
| — | GK | SUI | Roland Dahinden (goalkeeper reserves) |
| — | DF | SUI | Bernard Bula (reserves) |

| No. | Pos. | Nation | Player |
|---|---|---|---|
| — | DF | SUI | Guy Castelan (reserves) |
| — | DF | SUI | Roland Paolucci (on loan to Winterthur) |
| — | FW | GER | Stefan Reisch (to Kickers Würzburg) |

== Results ==
Legend

Win Draw Loss Postponed

=== Friendly matches ===
==== Pre- and Mid-season ====
| 22 July 1971 Pre-season | Aarau (Switzerland) | 2–2 | (Switzerland) Basel | Stadion Brügglifeld, Aarau |
| 20:00 | Meier 65' (1:2); Hauser 80' (2:2) | Summary | 45' (0:1) Riner; 57' (0:2) Riner | Attendance: 2,800; Referee: (Switzerland) Rudolf Rettig Gerlafingen |

| 27 July 1972 Uhrencup | Basel (Switzerland) | 2–4 | (Switzerland) Xamax | Stadion Brühl, Grenchen |
| 20:00 | Balmer 40' (1:3); Demarmels 86' (2:4) | Summary | 6' (0:1) Steiger; 12' (0:2) Mathez (I); 33' (0:3) Barbezat; 85' (1:4) Rub | Attendance: 2,000; Referee: (Switzerland) Hans Wieland Grenchen |

| 29 July 1972 Uhrencup | Grenchen (Switzerland) | 3–1 | (Switzerland) Basel | Stadion Brühl, Grenchen |
| 17:45 | Schaller 6' (1:0); Wäber 16' (2:0); Müller 57' (3:1) | Summary | 41' (2:1) Blättler | Attendance: 3,000; Referee: (Switzerland) Jean Dubach Nidau |

| 2 August 1972 Pre-season | FV Lörrach (West Germany) | 0–6 | (Switzerland) Basel | Stadtstadion, Lörrach |
| 18:30 | | Summary | 10' (0:1) Hitzfeld; 11' (0:2) Balmer; 25' (0:3) Hitzfeld; 56' (0:4) Demarmels; 66' (pen. 0:5) Hitzfeld; 67' (0:6) Blättler | Attendance: 3,000; Referee: (Switzerland) Kurt Woldrich |

| 1 November 1972 Mid-season | Spvgg Lahr (West Germany) | 1–1 | (Switzerland) Basel | Lahr |
| | Goal | Summary | Hitzfeld | Referee: (Switzerland) |

==== Winter break ====
| 25 January 1973 Winter break | Inter Hilton Acapulco (Mexico) | 3–4 | (Switzerland) Basel | Acapulco |
| | Goal | Summary | (2x) Riner (1x) Balmer (1x) Hitzfeld | Attendance: 3,000 |

| 28 January 1973 Winter break | Deportivo Toluca (Mexico) | 1–2 | (Switzerland) Basel | Toluca |
| | Goal | Summary | 17' Odermatt; 75' Hitzfeld |

| 4 February 1973 Winter break | Luzern (Switzerland) | 3–3 | (Switzerland) Basel | Stadion Allmend, Luzern |
| | Arrigoni 56' (1:2); Küttel 79' (2:3); Bosco 85' (3:3) | Summary | 16' (0:1) Demarmels; 26' (0:2) Odermatt; 67' (1:3) Riner | Attendance: 900; Referee: (Switzerland) Gottlieb Barmettler Luzern |

| 10 February 1973 Winter break | Zürich | 4–2 | Basel | Letzigrund, Zürich |
| 14:30 | Künzli 66' (1:2); Künzli 79' (2:2); Martinelli 83' (3:2); Marti 90' (4:2) | FCZ summary FCB summary | 39' (0:1) Hitzfeld; 65' (0:2) Stohler | Attendance: 1,300; Referee: (Switzerland) Rudolf Scheurer Bettlach |
Note: Half an hour before the game, a snowstorm: slippery, uneven surface.

| 14 February 1972 Winter break | Basel (Switzerland) | 2–3 | (Hungary) Budapest Honvéd | St. Jakob Stadium, Basel |
| 20:00 | Wenger 22' (1:1); Siegenthaler 89' (2:3) | Summary | 17' (0:1) Kozma; 47' (1:2) Pinter; 67' (1:3) Pinter | Attendance: 900; Referee: (Switzerland) |

| 18 February 1973 Winter break | Basel (Switzerland) | 3–0 | (Switzerland) Lausanne-Sport | St. Jakob Stadium, Basel |
| 14:30 | Wenger 43' (1:0); Riner 49' (2:0); Hitzfeld 85' (3:0) | Summary | | Attendance: 1,600; Referee: (Switzerland) Anton Bucheli Luzern |

| 25 February 1973 Winter break | Basel (Switzerland) | 1–1 | (Switzerland) Grenchen | St. Jakob Stadium, Basel |
| 14:30 | Ludwig 32' (1:1) | Summary | 28' (0:1) Braun | Attendance: 600; Referee: (Switzerland) Peter Hänggi Aesch |

=== Nationalliga ===
==== League matches ====
| 12 August 1972 Round 1 | Basel | 2–3 | Sion | St. Jakob Stadium, Basel |
| 20:00 | Hitzfeld 8' (1:0); Stohler 49' (2:2) | Summary | 21' (1:1) Trinchero; 42' (1:2) Hermann; 78' (2:3) Elsig | Attendance: 10,000; Referee: (Switzerland) |

| 19 August 1972 Round 2 | Winterthur | 3–1 | Basel | Schützenwiese, Winterthur |
| 17:15 | Paolucci 10' (1:0); Risi 22' (2:0); Risi 45' (3:1) | Summary | 35' (2:1) Hitzfeld | Attendance: 10,500; Referee: (Switzerland) Ulysse Darbellay Roche |

| 23 August 1972 Round 3 | Zürich | 1–1 | Basel | Letzigrund, Zürich |
| 20:15 | Jeandupeux 10' (1:1) | FCZ summary FCB summary | 2' (0:1) Mundschin; (yellow card) 15' Fischli | Attendance: 19,000; Referee: (Switzerland) Jean Dubach (Nidau) |

| 26 August 1972 Round 4 | Basel | 2–2 | Servette | St. Jakob Stadium, Basel |
| 20:00 | Ramseier 15' (1:0); Blättler 63' (2:0) | Summary | 78' (2:1) Wegmann; 85' (2:2) Dörfel | Attendance: 11,000; Referee: (Switzerland) Mario Clematide Zollikofen |

| 2 September 1972 Round 5 | Fribourg | 0–1 | Basel | Stade Universitaire Saint-Léonard, Fribourg |
| 20:15 | | Summary | 53' (1:0) Blättler; (yellow card) 47' Hasler; (yellow card) 48' Demarmels | Attendance: 10,500; Referee: (Switzerland) Hans Wieland Grenchen |

| 9 September 1972 Round 6 | Basel | 2–0 | Grenchen | St. Jakob Stadium, Basel |
| 18:00 | Ramseier 22' (1:0); Balmer 77' (2:0) | Summary | (yellow card) 85' Schaller | Attendance: 7,000; Referee: (Switzerland) Pierre Despont Lausanne |

| 16 September 1972 Round 7 | Grasshopper Club | 1–2 | Basel | Hardturm, Zürich |
| 20:15 | Meier 46' (1:0); Meyer (yellow card) 50'; Winiger (yellow card) 66' | Summary | 47' (o.g. 1:1); 63' (1:2) Hitzfeld; (yellow card) 64' Ramseier | Attendance: 11,000; Referee: (Switzerland) Bruno Della Bruna Lumino |

| 23 September 1972 Round 8 | Basel | 5–2 | Lugano | St. Jakob Stadium, Basel |
| 20:00 | Ramseier 25' (1:1); Balmer 27' (2:1); Wenger 46' (3:1); Balmer 86' (4:2); Hauser 89' (5:2) | Summary | 16' (0:1) Franceschi; 49' (3:2) Ausderau; (yellow card) 53' Rieländer; (yellow card) 74' Corghi | Attendance: 14,000; Referee: (Switzerland) Roland Racine Prilly |

| 30 September 1972 Round 9 | Basel | 4–3 | St. Gallen | St. Jakob Stadium, Basel |
| 20:00 | Wenger 8' (1:1); Wenger 51' (2:2); Ramseier 71' (3:2); Hasler 78' (4:2) | Summary | 5' (0:1) Leuzinger; 19' (1:2) Nasdalla; 90' (4:3) Coray | Attendance: 8,000; Referee: (Switzerland) Rudolf Scheurer Bettlach |

| 8 October 1972 Round 10 | Chiasso | 0–0 | Basel | Stadio Comunale (Chiasso) |
| 15:00 | | Summary | (yellow card) 62' Stohler | Attendance: 8,000; Referee: (Switzerland) André Favre Echallens |

| 14 October 1972 Round 11 | Basel | 2–1 | Lausanne-Sport | St. Jakob Stadium, Basel |
| 20:00 | Hitzfeld 49' (1:1); Mundschin 85' (2:1) | Summary | 33' (0:1) Garci | Attendance: 14,000; Referee: (Switzerland) Jean Dubach Nidau |

| 28 October 1972 Round 12 | La Chaux-de-Fonds | 2–3 | Basel | Stade Charrière, La Chaux-de-Fonds |
| 17:00 | Jaquet 17' (1:1); Meury 86' (pen. 2:3) | Summary | 9' (pen. 0:1) Hitzfeld; (yellow card) 32' Hitzfeld; 34' (1:2) Odermatt; 43' (1:3) Hitzfeld | Attendance: 5,500; Referee: (Switzerland) Walter Gallmann Oberrieden |

| 19 November 1972 Round 13 | Basel | 2–0 | Young Boys | St. Jakob Stadium, Basel |
| 14:30 | Hitzfeld 28' (1:0); Hasler 61' (pen. 2:0) | Summary | (yellow card) 41' Vögeli | Attendance: 13,500; Referee: (Switzerland) Bruno Della Bruna Lumino |

| 3 December 1972 Round 14 | Sion | 2–1 | Basel | Stade Tourbillon, Sion |
| 14:30 | Schaller 49' (1:0); Vergeres 80' (2:1); Luisier (yellow card) 85' | Summary | 51' (1:1) Odermatt; (yellow card) 70' Odermatt | Attendance: 8,500; Referee: (Switzerland) Mario Clematide Zollikofen |

| 4 March 1973 Round 15 | Basel | 3–1 | Winterthur | St. Jakob Stadium, Basel |
| 14:30 | Mundschin 7' (1:0); Balmer 40' (2:0); Balmer 59' (3:1) | Summary | (yellow card) 41' Meili; 51' (2:1) Risi | Attendance: 12,500; Referee: (Switzerland) Ulysse Darbellay Roche |

| 11 March 1973 Round 16 | Servette | 0–0 | Basel | Charmilles Stadium, Geneva |
| 15:00 | | Summary | | Attendance: 7,200; Referee: (Switzerland) Roland Keller Bern |

| 18 March 1973 Round 17 | Basel | 3–0 | Fribourg | St. Jakob Stadium, Basel |
| | Hitzfeld 24' (1:0); Ramseier 72' (2:0); Hitzfeld 76' (3:0) | Summary | | Attendance: 8,000; Referee: (Switzerland) Rudolf Scheurer Bettlach |

| 1 April 1973 Round 18 | Grenchen | 1–2 | Basel | Stadion Brühl, Grenchen |
| 15:00 | Feuz (II) 55' (1:1) | Summary | (yellow card) 27' Fischli; 37' (0:1) Hitzfeld; 70' (1:2) Hitzfeld | Attendance: 7,000; Referee: (Switzerland) André Favre Echallens |

| 14 April 1973 Round 19 | Basel | 0–1 | Grasshopper Club | St. Jakob Stadium, Basel |
| 20:00 | | Summary | 8' (0:1) P. Meier | Attendance: 28,000; Referee: (Switzerland) Jean Dubach Nidau |

| 29 April 1973 Round 20 | Lugano | 0–1 | Basel | Cornaredo, Lugano |
| 15:00 | | Summary | 8' (0:1) Balmer; (yellow card) 65' Wenger | Attendance: 7,200; Referee: (Switzerland) Roland Racine Prilly |

| 2 May 1973 Round 21 | Basel | 2–1 | Zürich | St. Jakob Stadium, Basel |
| 20:00 | Balmer 38' (1:0); Odermatt 48' (2:0) | FCZ summary FCB summary | (yellow card) 41' Heer; 76' (2:1) Brunnenmeier | Attendance: 26,000; Referee: (Switzerland) Rudolf Scheurer Bettlach |
Note: New floodlight system in operation for the first time (900 lux).

| 12 May 1973 Round 22 | St. Gallen | 3–4 | Basel | Espenmoos, St. Gallen |
| 20:15 | Blättler 25' (1:1); Nasdalla 53' (2:3); Nasdalla 90' (pen. 3:4) | Summary | 12' (0:1) Mundschin; 33' (1:2) Mundschin; 45' (1:3) Wenger; (yellow card) 53' Mundschin; 74' (2:4) Demarmels | Attendance: 10,200; Referee: (Switzerland) Anton Bucheli Luzern |

| 19 May 1972 Round 23 | Basel | 4–0 | Chiasso | St. Jakob Stadium, Basel |
| 20:00 | Hitzfeld 12' (1:0); Hitzfeld 70' (2:0); Balmer 80' (3:0); Demarmels 80' (4:0) | Summary | | Attendance: 7,000; Referee: (Switzerland) Fernand Burioli Lausanne |

| 26 May 1972 Round 24 | Lausanne-Sport | 0–0 | Basel | Olympique de la Pontaise, Lausanne |
| 20:30 | Ostojic (yellow card) 28'; Richard (yellow card) 47' | Summary | (yellow card) 30' Müller | Attendance: 15,000; Referee: (Switzerland) Bruno Della Bruna Lumino |
Note: Two instances of the pitch being invaded by several hundred youths. Corners 5:4

| 2 June 1972 Round 25 | Basel | 7–1 | La Chaux-de-Fonds | St. Jakob Stadium, Basel |
| 20:15 | Hitzfeld 16' (1:1); Balmer 18' (2:1); Hasler 42' (3:1); Balmer 51' (4:1); Hitzfeld 70' (5:1); Hitzfeld 71' (pen. 6:1); Demarmels 82' (7:1) | Summary | 14' (0:1) Delavelle; (yellow card) 42' Zaugg; (yellow card) 71' Forestier | Attendance: 12,000; Referee: (Switzerland) Hans Wieland Grenchen |

| 9 June 1972 Round 26 | Young Boys | 2–3 | Basel | Wankdorf Stadium, Bern |
| 20:15 | Brechbühl 37' (1:1); Bosshard 84' (2:3) | Summary | 15' (pen. 0:1) Hitzfeld; 53' (1:2) Hitzfeld; 66' (1:3) Balmer | Attendance: 24,000; Referee: (Switzerland) Marcel Despland (Yverdon-les-Bains) |
Note: Last game for Marcel Despland as referee.

==== Final league table ====
| Pos | Team | Pld | W | D | L | GF | GA | GD | Pts | Qualification |
|---|---|---|---|---|---|---|---|---|---|---|
| 1 | Basel | 26 | 17 | 5 | 4 | 57 | 30 | +27 | 39 | Swiss champions, qualified for 1973–74 European Cup |
| 2 | Grasshopper Club | 26 | 14 | 7 | 5 | 54 | 32 | +22 | 35 | Qualified for 1973–74 UEFA Cup and entered 1973 Intertoto Cup |
| 3 | Sion | 26 | 13 | 7 | 6 | 35 | 30 | +5 | 33 | Qualified for 1973–74 UEFA Cup |
| 4 | Servette | 26 | 14 | 3 | 9 | 41 | 23 | +18 | 31 | |
| 5 | Winterthur | 26 | 12 | 6 | 8 | 40 | 29 | +11 | 30 | Entered 1973 Intertoto Cup |
| 6 | Lausanne-Sport | 26 | 11 | 6 | 9 | 46 | 27 | +19 | 28 | |
| 7 | Zürich | 26 | 10 | 8 | 8 | 38 | 33 | +5 | 28 | Swiss Cup winners, qualified for 1973–74 Cup Winners' Cup and entered 1973 Intertoto Cup |
| 8 | Lugano | 26 | 9 | 9 | 8 | 31 | 30 | +1 | 27 | Entered 1973 Intertoto Cup |
| 9 | Young Boys | 26 | 9 | 5 | 12 | 39 | 40 | −1 | 23 | |
| 10 | La Chaux-de-Fonds | 26 | 8 | 7 | 11 | 30 | 43 | −13 | 23 | |
| 11 | Chiasso | 26 | 8 | 5 | 13 | 21 | 48 | −27 | 21 | |
| 12 | St. Gallen | 26 | 7 | 5 | 14 | 31 | 49 | −18 | 19 | |
| 13 | Fribourg | 26 | 4 | 7 | 15 | 24 | 43 | −19 | 15 | Relegated to 1973–74 Nationalliga B |
| 14 | Grenchen | 26 | 4 | 4 | 18 | 23 | 53 | −30 | 12 | Relegated to 1973–74 Nationalliga B |

Source: rsssf.com

=== Swiss Cup ===
| 5 November 1972 Round of 32 | Basel | 6–0 | Martigny-Sports | St. Jakob Stadium, Basel |
| 14:30 | Riner 18' (1:0); Balmer 49' (2:0); Hitzfeld 77' (pen. 3:0); Riner 81' (4:0); Balmer 83' (5:0); Riner 87' (6:0) | Summary | | Attendance: 5,000; Referee: (Switzerland) Ernest Guignet Yverdon |

| 26 November 1972 Round of 16 | BSC Young Boys | 0–4 | Basel | Wankdorf Stadium, Bern |
| 14:30 | Brechbühl (yellow card) 65' | Summary | 26' (0:1) Demarmels; 57' (0:2) Riner; 61' (0:3) Odermatt; 63' (0:4) Wenger | Attendance: 11,500; Referee: (Switzerland) Anton Bucheli Luzern |

| 10 December 1972 Quarter-final; First leg | Chiasso | 0–2 | Basel | Stadio Comunale, Chiasso |
| 14:30 | Ferroni (yellow card) 68'; Sulmoni (yellow card) 70' | Summary | 2' (0:1) Balmer; (yellow card) 37' Ramseier; (yellow card) 44' Wenger; 55' (0:2) Wenger | Attendance: 4,000; Referee: (Switzerland) Roland Racine Prilly |

| 17 December 1972 Second leg | Basel | 5–3 (7–3 agg.) | Chiasso | St. Jakob Stadium, Basel |
| 14:30 | Ries 12' (1:0); Balmer 15' (2:0); Hasler 64' (3:2); Odermatt 68' (4:2); Odermatt 89' (5:3) | Summary | 32' (2:1) Allio; 34' (2:2) Boriani; 79' (4:2) Messerli; (yellow card) 81' Katnic | Attendance: 6,500; Referee: (Switzerland) Walter Gallmann Oberrieden |

| 25 March 1973 Semi-final; First leg | Biel-Bienne | 0–1 | Basel | Gurzelen Stadion, Biel/Bienne |
| 20:15 | | Summary | 76' Hitzfeld | Attendance: 10,000; Referee: (Switzerland) Bruno Della Bruna Lumino |

| 28 March 1973 Semi-final; Second leg | Basel | 5–1 (6–1 agg.) | Biel-Bienne | St. Jakob Stadium, Basel |
| | Balmer 19' (1:1); Balmer 31' (2:1); Hitzfeld 36' (3:1); Balmer 51' (4:1); Demarmels 78' (6:1) | Summary | 6' (0:1) Konrad | Attendance: 7,800; Referee: (Switzerland) Walter Gallmann (Oberrieden) |

| 23 April 1973 Final | Zürich | 2–0 (a.e.t.) | Basel | Wankdorf, Bern |
| 14:30 | Münch (yellow card) 22'; Zigerlig (yellow card) 36'; Marti 92'; Künzli 101'; Bionda (yellow card) 104' | FCZ summary FCB summary | (yellow card) 41' Hitzfeld; (yellow card) 99' Demarmels; (yellow card) 104' Odermatt | Attendance: 45,000; Referee: (Switzerland) Roland Keller (Bern |
Note: 42,591 paying spectators, 2,500 invited guests.

=== Swiss League Cup ===
| 5 August 1972 Round of 16 | Basel | 8–0 | Servette FC Genève | St. Jakob Stadium, Basel |
| 20:00 | Balmer 12' (1:0); Hitzfeld 21' (2:0); Hitzfeld 25' (3:0); Stohler 49' (4:0); Stohler 57' (5:0); Wenger 73' (6:0); Riner 77' (7:0); Wenger 86' (8:0) | Summary | | Attendance: 5,000; Referee: (Switzerland) Gérard Racine Biel/Bienne |

| 8 August Quarter-final | Basel | 2–1 (a.e.t.) | Lausanne-Sport | St. Jakob Stadium, Basel |
| | Balmer 78' (1:1); Schönebeck 120' (2:1) | Summary | 69' (0:1) Piccand | Attendance: 8,300 |

| 11 October 1972 Semi-final | Basel | 6–1 | Sion | St. Jakob Stadium, Basel |
| | Hitzfeld 16' (1:0); Balmer 26' (2:0); Demarmels 42' (3:1); Demarmels (yellow card) 57'; Odermatt 64' (4:1); Demarmels 75' (5:1); Wenger 81' (6:1) | Summary | 26' (2:1) Hermann; (yellow card) 47' Valentini; (yellow card) 47' Wampfler; (yellow card) 76' Barberis | Attendance: 5,500; Referee: (Switzerland) Anton Bucheli Luzern |

| 11 November 1972 Final | Basel | 4–1 | FC Winterthur | Letzigrund, Zürich |
| 14:30 | Hitzfeld 6' (1:0); Hitzfeld 22' (2:0); Balmer 40' (3:1); Hitzfeld 90' (pen. 4:1) | Summary | 25' Nielsen | Attendance: 7,600; Referee: (Switzerland) Jean Dubach Nidau |

=== European Cup ===
First round

| 13 September 1972 First leg | Újpesti Dózsa (Hungary) | 2–0 | (Switzerland) Basel | Újpest |
| | Bene (yellow card) 39'; Horváth 57'; Zámbó 60' | UEFA summary FCB summary | (yellow card) 88' Ramseier | Stadium: Ferenc Szusza Stadium; Attendance: 7,000; Referee: (Austria) Paul Schiller |

| 27 September 1972 Second leg | Basel (Switzerland) | 3–2 | (Hungary) Újpesti Dózsa | Basel |
| 20:00 | Hasler 65' (1:1); Balmer 75' (2:1); Balmer 83' (3:1) | UEFA summary FCB summary | (yellow card) 32' E. Dunai; 46' (0:1) Bene; (yellow card) 58' P. Juhász; 89' (3:2) Bene | Stadium: St. Jakob Stadium; Attendance: 16,000; Referee: (England) Walker |

Újpesti Dózsa won 4–3 on aggregate.

=== Cup of the Alps ===
==== Matches ====
| 17 June 1972 Round 1 | Girondins de Bordeaux (France) | 1–3 | (Switzerland) Basel | Parc Lescure, Bordeaux |
| | Papin 34' (1:2) | Summary | 14' (0:1) Balmer; 32' (0:2) Blättler; 85' (1:3) Wenger | Attendance: 2,500; Referee: (Switzerland) Gérard Racine Biel/Bienne |

| 20 June 1972 Round 2 | Olympique Lyonnais (France) | 1–0 | (Switzerland) Basel | Stade de Gerland, Lyon |
| | Trivic 28' (1:0) | Summary | | Attendance: 3,410; Referee: (Switzerland) Roland Keller Bern |

| 24 June 1972 Round 3 | Basel (Switzerland) | 3–4 | (France) Girondins de Bordeaux | St. Jakob Stadium, Basel |
| 20:00 | Hasler 3' (1:0); Balmer 48' (2:2); Hasler 90' (3:4) | Summary | 21' (1:1) Goubet; 25' (1:2) Giresse; 49' (2:3) Lipo; 52' (2:4) Petit | Attendance: 4,500; Referee: (France) Roger Machin |

| 27 June 1972 Round 4 | Basel (Switzerland) | 3–2 | (France) Olympique Lyonnais | St. Jakob Stadium, Basel |
| 20:00 | Demarmels 52' (1:0); Stohler 68' (2:1); Ramseier 87' (3:1) | Summary | 55' (1:1) Lacombe; 88' (3:2) Di Nallo | Attendance: 2,600; Referee: (France) Robert Frauciel |

==== Group B league table ====
| Pos | Team | Pld | W | D | L | GF | GA | Pts | Notes |
|---|---|---|---|---|---|---|---|---|---|
| 1 | Girondins de Bordeaux | 4 | 3 | 0 | 1 | 14 | 9 | 6 | Qualified for final |
| 2 | Basel | 4 | 2 | 0 | 2 | 9 | 4 | 4 | |
| 3 | Olympique Lyonnais | 4 | 2 | 0 | 2 | 8 | 8 | 4 | |
| 4 | Servette | 4 | 1 | 0 | 3 | 8 | 14 | 2 | |

== See also ==
- History of FC Basel
- List of FC Basel players
- List of FC Basel seasons

== Sources ==
- Rotblau: Jahrbuch Saison 2015/2016. Publisher: FC Basel Marketing AG. ISBN 978-3-7245-2050-4
- Die ersten 125 Jahre. Publisher: Josef Zindel im Friedrich Reinhardt Verlag, Basel. ISBN 978-3-7245-2305-5
- Verein "Basler Fussballarchiv" Homepage
- Switzerland 1972–73 at RSSSF
- Swiss League Cup 1972 at RSSSF
- Cup of the Alps 1972 at RSSSF
