= 1973–74 FC Basel season =

FC Basel
1973–74 season
- Chairman: Félix Musfeld
- Manager: Helmut Benthaus
- Ground: St. Jakob Stadium, Basel
- Nationalliga A: 5th
- Swiss Cup: Quarter-finals
- Swiss League Cup: Round of 16
- European Cup: Quarter-final
- Coppa delle Alpi: Group stage
- Top goalscorer: League: Ottmar Hitzfeld (19); All: Ottmar Hitzfeld (25)
- Highest home attendance: 25,000 on 27 October 1973 vs Zürich
- Lowest home attendance: 4,500 on 3 March 1974 vs Chiasso
- Average home league attendance: 10,923

The 1973–74 season was Fussball Club Basel 1893's 80th season in their existence. It was their 28th consecutive season in the top flight of Swiss football after their promotion the season 1945–46. They played their home games in the St. Jakob Stadium.

== Overview ==
=== Pre-season ===
Helmut Benthaus was first team manager. This was his ninth season as manager. To the beginning of the season Urs Siegenthaler moved on to play for Xamax and Rolf Riner left to play for Servette. In the other direction Rudolf Wampfler joined from Sion, Arthur von Wartburg joined from Concordia Basel and Roland Paolucci returned from his loan to Winterthur.

But the most notorious transfer was that of Teófilo Cubillas from Alianza Lima. The Basler entrepreneur and transport company owner Ruedi Reisdorfer paid the transfer fee of £97,000. Cubillas scored two goals for Basel in the 1973–74 European Cup, the first of which in the 1st leg against Fram on 19 September 1973 and the second in the return leg on 20 September. He only remained at the club for six months, which was not long enough for him to show the extent of his talent. Later on, for the second half of the 1973–74 season he joined Portuguese club Porto for a fee of £200,000.

Basel played a total of 54 games in their 1973–74 season. 26 in the domestic league, four in the Swiss Cup, one in the Swiss League Cup, six in the European Cup and 17 were friendly matches. The team scored a total of 143 goals and conceded 91.

=== Domestic league ===
The Nationalliga A season 1973–74 was contested under 14 teams. These were the top 12 teams from the previous 1972–73 season and the two newly promoted teams Xamax and Chênois. The championship was played in a double round robin. The champions would qualify for the 1974–75 European Cup, the second and third placed teams were to qualify for 1974–75 UEFA Cup and the last two teams in the table at the end of the season were to be relegated. Zürich won the championship 12 points ahead of Grasshopper Club, 13 ahead of the Servette and FC Winterthur. Basel finished in fifth position and were 16 points behind the new champions. Basel won 13 of their 26 league games, drew three and lost ten games. They scored a total of 57 goals conceding 39. La Chaux-de-Fonds and Chiasso suffered relegation. Basel's striker Ottmar Hitzfeld was the team's top goal scorer, with 19 league goals he was third in the league ranking behind Daniel Jeandupeux (22) and Walter Müller (21). Basel's second top scorer was Walter Mundschin with seven goals, René Hasler and Karl Odermatt each scored six goals, Walter Balmer managed five and Teófilo Cubillas scored three league goals.

Basel's highest scoring game was in the 24th round on 8 May 1974 as they sent Lausanne-Sports home with an 8–2 package from the St. Jakob Stadium. Karl Odermatt scored the first two goals in the 5th and the 11th minute, Ottmar Hitzfeld added the next two in the 15th and 17th minute before Walter Mundschin added the next two in the 20th and 25th Minute to make it six goals in 25 minutes. A penalty goal by Müller pulled one back for Lausanne-Sport, but despite this Basel led 6–1 at half time. Hitzfeld scored his personal third goal in the 57th minute and in the 75th Markus Tanner netted the final goal of the game. Roger Piccand had scored Lausannes second in the 71st minute.

=== Swiss Cup and League Cup ===
In the Swiss Cup Basel played the round of 32 on 22 September 1973 away against Biel-Bienne in the Gurzelen Stadion and won 2–1. In the round of 16 on 6 October 1973 they played away again against Mendrisiostar and won 4–1. In this game Cubillas scored two goals. The quarter-final was a two legged fixtures. The first leg played on 31 October 1973 in Stade Tourbillon was a 1–0 defeat against Sion. The second leg played on 4 November 1973 in the St. Jakob Stadium ended in a 2–2 draw, thus Sion won 3–2 on aggregate. In the 1973 Swiss League Cup Basel were drawn with an away game against Neuchâtel Xamax in the first round and were eliminated.

=== European Cup ===
As reigning Swiss Champions, Basel were qualified for the 1973–74 European Cup. In the first round, drawn against Iceland's champions Fram, Basel won with the aggregate score 11–2. In the second round they were drawn against Club Brugge. In the exiting second leg Basel won 6–4 and thus 7–6 on aggregate. In the quarter-final Basel won the first leg against Celtic 3–2 and in the second leg Celtic won by the same score. During extra time Scottish international Steve Murray scored the decisive goal in the 114th minute. Celtic continued to the semi-final but did not reach the final.

== Players ==
Note: Flags indicate national team as defined under FIFA eligibility rules; some limited exceptions apply. Players may hold more than one non-FIFA nationality.

No.	Pos.	Nation	Player
1	GK	SUI	Marcel Kunz
2	DF	GER	Josef Kiefer
3	DF	SUI	Walter Mundschin
4	MF	SUI	Peter Ramseier
5	DF	SUI	Paul Fischli
6	MF	SUI	Otto Demarmels
7	FW	SUI	Walter Balmer
8	MF	SUI	Karl Odermatt
9	FW	GER	Ottmar Hitzfeld
10	FW	PER	Teófilo Cubillas (from Alianza Lima)
11	FW	SUI	Peter Wenger
12	MF	SUI	Bruno Rahmen

No.	Pos.	Nation	Player
13	MF	SUI	Rudolf Wampfler (from Sion)
14	DF	SUI	Jörg Stohler
15	MF	SUI	Roland Paolucci (end of loan by Winterthur)
16	DF	SUI	René Hasler
17	FW	SUI	Markus Tanner (from youth team)
18	MF	SUI	Felix Tschudin (from youth team)
19	MF	SUI	Arthur von Wartburg (from Concordia Basel)
22	GK	FRA	Jean-Paul Laufenburger
—	MF	SUI	Heinz Schönebeck (reserves)
—	GK	SUI	Thomas Manger (reserves)
—	GK	SUI	Hans Müller (reserves)
—	DF	SUI	Alex Wirth (reserves)
—	FW	SUI	Roger Ries (reserves)

Players who left the squad

Note: Flags indicate national team as defined under FIFA eligibility rules; some limited exceptions apply. Players may hold more than one non-FIFA nationality.

No.	Pos.	Nation	Player
—	GK	SUI	Urs Reto Grieshaber (reserves)

No.	Pos.	Nation	Player
—	MF	SUI	Urs Siegenthaler (to Xamax)
—	FW	SUI	Rolf Riner (to Servette)

== Results ==
Legend

Win Draw Loss Postponed

=== Friendly matches ===
==== Pre-season and mid-season ====
21 July 1973 Pre-season	Basel (Switzerland)	5–2	(West Germany) Freiburger FC	St. Jakob Stadium, Basel
18:00	Balmer 1' (1:0); Wenger 5' (2:0); Hitzfeld 53' (3:2); Hitzfeld 62' (4:2); Balmer 83' (5:2)	Summary	31' (2:1) Gruler; 46' (2:2) Vogtmann	Attendance: 1,300; Referee: (Switzerland) Josef Schnidrig

27 July 1973 Pre-season	Luzern (Switzerland)	4–2	(Switzerland) Basel	Herti Allmend Stadion, Zug
17:30	Huttary 15' (1:0); Bosco 48' (2:2); Küttel 54' (3:2); Bosco (4:2)	Summary	17' (1:1) Hitzfeld; 25' (1:2) Wampfler	Attendance: 3,500; Referee: (Switzerland) Willi Dreier (Zürich)

1 August 1973 Pre-season	Nordstern Basel (Switzerland)	1–3	(Switzerland) Basel	Landhof, Basel
15:00	Degen 35' (1:0)	Summary	49' (1:1) Ramseier; 78' (1:2) Hitzfeld; 89' (o.g. 1:2) Huguenin	Attendance: 3,500; Referee: (Switzerland) Kurt Fuchs (Basel)

4 August 1973 Pre-season	Basel (Switzerland)	2–4	(West Germany) Bayern Munich	St. Jakob Stadium, Basel
20:00	Balmer 10' (1:0); Hitzfeld 19' (2:0)	Summary	(penalty missed) 16′ Müller; 47' (pen.2:1) Breitner; 51' (2:2) Müller; 64' (2:3) Beckenbauer; 89' (2:4) Müller; (yellow card) Breitner	Attendance: 32,000; Referee: (Switzerland) Rudolf Scheurer (Bettlach)

7 September 1973 Mid-season	Basel (Switzerland)	2–0	(Peru) Club Centro Deportivo Municipal	St. Jakob Stadium, Basel
20:00	Castillo 37' (o.g. 1:0); Balmer 81' (2:0)	Summary		Attendance: 7,000; Referee: (Switzerland) Walter Gallmann (Oberrieden)

==== Winter break to end of season ====
14 January 1974 Winter break	La Gauloise de Basse-Terre/Redstar (Guadeloupe)	0–6	(Switzerland) Basel	Guadeloupe
		Summary	5' (0:1) Demarmels; 13' (0:2) Hasler; 17' (0:3) Hasler; 20' (0:4) Hasler; 50' (0:5) Wenger; 58' (0:6) Rahmen

16 January 1974 Winter break	Guadeloupe XI	0–2	(Switzerland) Basel	Guadeloupe
		Summary	(1x) Tanner (1x) Hasler

19 January 1974 Winter break	Martinique XI	1–2	(Switzerland) Basel	Martinique
	Goal	Summary	(1x) Mundschin (1x) Wenger

2 February 1974 Winter break	Nordstern Basel (Switzerland)	0–2	(Switzerland) Basel	Stadion Rankhof, Basel
14:30		Summary	13' (0:1) Balmer; 66' (0:2) Demarmels	Attendance: 1,500; Referee: (Switzerland) Walter Rudin (Birsfelden)

9 February 1974 Winter break	Basel (Switzerland)	5–1	(Switzerland) Zürich	Landhof, Basel
14:30	Stohler 3' (1:0); Balmer 17' (2:0); Balmer 45' (3:0); Balmer 50' (4:0); Hasler 41' (pen. 5:1)	FCZ summary FCB summary	72' (4:1) Katić	Attendance: 1,800; Referee: (Switzerland) Josef Schnidrig (Röschenz)
Note: Very soft conditions. Corners 4:9

13 February 1974 Winter break	Freiburger FC (West Germany)	1–3	(Switzerland) Basel	Möslestadion Freiburg
	Dospial (penalty missed) 42′ Westermann 89' (1:3)	Summary	6' (0:1) Tanner; 19' (0:2) Hitzfeld; 83' (0:3) Balmer	Attendance: 1,500; Referee: (West Germany) Binninger

17 February 1974 Winter break	FC Saint-Louis (France)	2–5	(Switzerland) Basel	Stade de la Frontière, Saint-Louis
	Deichtmann 83' (1:5); Antony 84' (2:5)	Summary	17' (0:1); 20' (0:2) Balmer; 25' (0:3) Wenger; 74' (0:4) Demarmels; 80' (o.g. 0:5) Jacob	Attendance: 2,000; Referee: (France) Gewiss

19 February 1974 Winter break	TSV 1860 Munich (West Germany)	2–0	(Switzerland) Basel	Grünwalder Stadion
	Mrosko 2' (1:0); Mrosko 76' (2:0)	Summary		Attendance: 1,000

23 February 1974 Winter break	Basel (Switzerland)	6–2	(Switzerland) Grenchen	Landhof, Basel
14:30	Balmer 24' (1:0); Wenger 25' (2:0); Mundschin 35' (3:0); Tschudin 68' (4:0); Hitzfeld 79' (5:2); Fischli 83' (6:2)	Summary	75' (pen. 4:1) Maradan; 77' (4:2) Wirth	Attendance: 400; Referee: (Switzerland) Kurt Fuchs (Basel)

9 April 1974 Mid-season	Basel (Switzerland)	3–1	(West Germany) Hertha BSC	St. Jakob Stadium, Basel
20:00	Hasler 8' (1:0); Stohler 45' (2:0); Hitzfeld 73' (3:0)	Summary	87' (3:1) Sziedat	Attendance: 12,000; Referee: (Switzerland) Hans Wieland (Grenchen)

3 June 1974 End of season	Basel (Switzerland)	2–5	Brazil	St. Jakob Stadium Basel
17:00	Balmer 20' (1:0); Balmer 41' (2:1)	Report	30' (1:1) Rivellino; 43' (2:2) Rivellino; 59' (2:3) Jairzinho; 73' (2:4) Rivellino; 79' (2:5) Valdomiro	Attendance: 43,000; Referee: (Switzerland) Anton Bucheli (Luzern)

8 June 1974 End of season	Basel (Switzerland)	4–3	Uruguay	St. Jakob Stadium, Basel
20:00	Hitzfeld 13' (1:0); Hitzfeld 16' (2:0); Mundschin 23' (3:0); Mundschin 29' (4:0)	Summary	42' (4:1) Milar; 50' (4:2) Gómez; 80' (4:3) Forlán	Attendance: 12,500; Referee: (Switzerland) Hans Wieland (Grenchen)

=== Nationalliga ===
==== League matches ====
18 August 1973 Round 1	Chênois	0–1	Basel	Stade des Trois-Chêne, Thônex
20:30	Mariétan (yellow card) 90'	Summary	(yellow card) 15' Wampfler; 41' (0:1) Cubillas	Attendance: 7,200; Referee: (Switzerland) Walter Gallmann (Oberrieden)

25 August 1973 Round 2	Basel	3–0	Lugano	St. Jakob Stadium, Basel
20:00	Cubillas 30' (1:0); Hitzfeld 36' (2:0); Hasler 65' (3:0)	Summary		Attendance: 16,000; Referee: (Switzerland) Anton Bucheli (Luzern)

28 August 1973 Round 3	Basel	1–3	Grasshopper Club	St. Jakob Stadium, Basel
20;00	Paolucci (yellow card) 76'; Paolucci 89' (1:2)	Summary	32' (0:1) Becker; 43' (0:2) Grahn; (yellow card) 87' Staudenmann; 90+2' (1:3) Noventa	Attendance: 19,500; Referee: (Switzerland) Bruno Della Bruna (Lumino)

1 September 1973 Round 4	Sion	1–2	Basel	Stade Tourbillon, Sion
20:15	Schaller (1:0)	Summary	48' (1:1) Mundschin; 50' (1:2) Mundschin; (yellow card) 75' Mundschin; (yellow card) 80' Wenger	Attendance: 11,000; Referee: (Switzerland) Ernest Guignet (Yverdon)

15 September 1973 Round 5	Chiasso	1–1	Basel	Stadio Comunale Riva IV Chiasso
20:30	Allio (yellow card) 25'; Sogari (yellow card) 44'; Allio 79' (1:1)	Summary	(yellow card) 26' Ramseier; 27' (0:1) Demarmels; (yellow card) 33' Hitzfeld	Attendance: 6,000; Referee: (Switzerland) Rudolf Scheurer (Bettlach)

29 September 1973 Round 6	Basel	1–2	Xamax	St. Jakob Stadium, Basel
20:00	Stohler 39' (1:1); Odermatt (yellow card); Fischli (yellow card)	Summary	8' (0:1) Mathez; 42' (1:2) Elsig; (yellow card) Blusch	Attendance: 9,000; Referee: (Switzerland) } Hans Wieland (Grenchen)

13 October 1973 Round 7	St. Gallen	2–1	Basel	Espenmoos, St. Gallen
17:00	Rafreider 53' (1:0); Schwizer 68' (2:0)	Summary	69' (2:1) Odermatt; (yellow card) 76' Hasler; (yellow card) 86' Demarmels	Attendance: 12,800; Referee: (Switzerland) Roland Racine (Prilly)

27 October 1973 Round 8	Basel	1–3	Zürich	St. Jakob Stadium, Basel
20:00	Hitzfeld 89' (1:3)	FCZ summary Summary	35' (0:1) Jeandupeux; 29' (0:2) Katić; 72' (0:3) Rutschmann	Attendance: 25,000; Referee: (Switzerland) Anton Bucheli (Luzern)
Note: A very cold, almost wintry evening. The ground was wet and slippery, but still playable.

11 November 1973 Round 9	Servette	2–3	Basel	Charmilles Stadium, Geneva
14:45	Schnyder 13' (1:0); Barriquand 51' (2:2)	Summary	30' (1:1) Cubillas; 33' (1:2) Wampfler; (yellow card) 73' Tanner; (yellow card) 78' Tschudin; 88' (2:3) Mundschin	Attendance: 12,500; Referee: (Switzerland) Walter Gallmann (Oberrieden)

25 November 1973 Round 10	Basel	4–2	La Chaux-de-Fonds	St. Jakob Stadium, Basel
14:30	Mundschin 4' (1:0); Hasler 29' (2:0); Hasler (yellow card) 36'; Hitzfeld 65' (3:0); Hasler 89' (4:2)	Summary	75' (3:1) Delavelle; 77' (3:2) Veya	Attendance: 10,500; Referee: (Switzerland) René Matthieu

2 December 1973 Round 11	Lausanne-Sport	2–0	Basel	Olympique de la Pontaise, Lausanne
14:30	Ducret 53' (1:0); Müller 85' (2:0)	Summary		Attendance: 5,000; Referee: (Switzerland) Rudolf Scheurer (Bettlach)

9 December 1973 Round 12	Basel	2–3	Young Boys	St. Jakob Stadium, Basel
14_30	Balmer 68' (1:1); Balmer 79' (2:1)	Summary	16' (0:1) Brechbühl; 51' (2:2) Andersen; 87' (2:3) Schild	Attendance: 8,000; Referee: (Switzerland) Ulysse Darbellay (Roche)

16 December 1973 Round 13	Winterthur	3–2	Basel	Schützenwiese, Winterthur
14:30	Nielsen 15' (1:0); Nielsen 25' (2:0); Künzli 86' (3:2)	Summary	(yellow card) 32' Demarmels; 45' (2:1) Wenger; 52' (2:2) Hasler	Attendance: 4,000; Referee: (Switzerland) Roland Racine (Prilly)

3 March 1974 Round 14	Basel	6–0	Chênois	St. Jakob Stadium, Basel
14:30	Hitzfeld 7' (pen. 1:0); Hasler 38' (2:0); Odermatt 42' (3:0); Odermatt 45' (4:0); Hitzfeld 48' (5:0); Detruche 64' (o.g. 6:0)	Summary		Attendance: 4,500; Referee: (Switzerland) Roland Racine (Prilly)

10 March 1974 Round 15	Lugano	0–0	Basel	Cornaredo, Lugano
14:45	Arigoni (yellow card) 43'; Binetti (yellow card) 53'	Summary	(yellow card) 40' Wenger	Attendance: 3,000; Referee: (Switzerland) André Favre (Echallens)

17 March 1974 Round 16	Basel	1–0	Sion	St. Jakob Stadium, Basel
14:30	Odermatt 36' (1:0)	Summary		Attendance: 8,000; Referee: (Switzerland) Giovanni Fazzini (Osogna)

31 March 1974 Round 17	Basel	3–1	Chiasso	St. Jakob Stadium, Basel
14:30	Hitzfeld 42' (pen. 1:1); Balmer 43' (2:1); Hitzfeld 77' (3:1); Balmer (yellow card) 86'	Summary	10' (0:1) M. Preisig; (yellow card) 31' Allio	Attendance: 7,000; Referee: (Switzerland) Fernand Burioli (Lausanne)

6 April 1974 Round 18	Xamax	0–5	Basel	Stade de la Maladière (1924), Neuchâtel
20:15		Summary	21' (0:1) Fischli; 44' (0:2) Hitzfeld; 50' (0:3) Hitzfeld; (penalty missed) 58′ Hitzfeld; 71' (0:4) Hitzfeld; 76' (0:5) Balmer	Attendance: 12,400; Referee: (Switzerland) René Matthieu

20 April 1974 Round 19	Basel	1–1	St. Gallen	St. Jakob Stadium, Basel
20:00	Hitzfeld 73' (pen. 1:1)	Summary	63' (0:1) Nasdalla	Attendance: 11,000; Referee: (Switzerland) Anton Bucheli (Luzern)

28 April 1974 Round 20	Zürich	5–1	Basel	Letzigrund, Zürich
15:15	Fischli 23' (o.g. 1:0); Katic 52' (2:1); Martinelli 53' (3:1); Jeandupeux 65' (4:1); Katic 88' (5:1)	Summary	40' (pen. 1:1) Hitzfeld	Attendance: 26,000; Referee: (Switzerland) Rudolf Scheurer (Bettlach)

4 May 1974 Round 21	Basel	5–1	Servette	St. Jakob Stadium, Basel
20:00	Hitzfeld 39' (1:0); Morgenegg 42' (o.g. 2:0); Rahmen (yellow card) 49'; Mundschin 63' (3:0); Odermatt 70' (4:0); Hitzfeld 80' (pen. 5:0)	Summary	84' (5:1) Barriquand	Attendance: 7,500; Referee: (Switzerland) Bruno Della Bruna (Lumino)

11 May 1974 Round 22	La Chaux-de-Fonds	0–2	Basel	Stade Charrière, La Chaux-de-Fonds
20:15		Summary	37' (0:1) Wampfler; 73' (0:2) Balmer	Attendance: 2,700; Referee: (Switzerland) Giovanni Fazzini (Osogna)

14 May 1974 Round 23	Grasshopper Club	2–1	Basel	Hardturm, Zürich
20:15	Ohlhauser 58' (1:1); Meier 73' (2:1)	FCB summary	37' (0:1) Hasler	Attendance: 8,500; Referee: (Switzerland) Hans Wieland (Grenchen)

18 May 1974 Round 24	Basel	8–2	Lausanne-Sport	St. Jakob Stadium, Basel
20:00	Odermatt 5' (1:0); Odermatt 11' (2:0); Hitzfeld 15' (3:0); Hitzfeld 17' (4:0); Mundschin (5:0); Mundschin 26' (6:0); Hitzfeld 56' (7:1); Tanner 75' (8:2)	Summary	42' (pen. 6:1) Müller; 71' (7:2) Piccand	Attendance: 9,000; Referee: (Switzerland) Rudolf Scheurer (Bettlach)

25 May 1974 Round 25	Young Boys	3–1	Basel	Wankdorf Stadium, Bern
18:15	Andersen 55' (1:0); Andersen 67' (2:0); Muhmenthaler 80' (3:1)	Summary	70' (2:1) Hitzfeld	Attendance: 13,000; Referee: (Switzerland) Walter Hungerbühler (St. Gallen)

1 June 1974 Round 26	Basel	1–0	Winterthur	St. Jakob Stadium, Basel
20:00	Hitzfeld 48' (1:0)	Summary		Attendance: 7,000; Referee: (Switzerland) Roland Keller (Bern)

==== Final league table ====
Pos	Team	Pld	W	D	L	GF	GA	GD	Pts	Qualification
1	Zürich	26	20	5	1	67	20	+47	45	Champions, qualified for 1974–75 European Cup and entered 1974 Intertoto Cup
2	Grasshopper Club	26	12	9	5	41	27	+14	33	Qualified for 1974–75 UEFA Cup and entered 1974 Intertoto Cup
3	Servette	26	12	8	6	49	35	+14	32	Qualified for 1974–75 UEFA Cup
4	Winterthur	26	13	6	7	42	29	+13	32	Entered 1974 Intertoto Cup
5	Basel	26	13	3	10	57	39	+18	29	
6	Young Boys	26	10	8	8	52	38	+14	28	
7	Xamax	26	10	6	10	38	38	0	26	Entered 1974 Intertoto Cup
8	Lausanne-Sport	26	9	8	9	45	48	−3	26	
9	St. Gallen	26	10	5	11	38	48	−10	25	
10	Sion	26	5	12	9	24	31	−7	22	Swiss Cup winners, qualified for 1974–75 Cup Winners' Cup
11	Chênois	26	7	8	11	30	48	−18	22	
12	Lugano	26	4	9	13	20	44	−24	17	
13	La Chaux-de-Fonds	26	3	10	13	28	51	−23	16	Relegated to 1974–75 Nationalliga B
14	Chiasso	26	2	7	17	18	53	−35	11	Relegated to 1974–75 Nationalliga B

Source: rsssf.com
Rules for classification: 1) Points; 2) Goal difference within the league, however with play-off for qualifiers;

=== Swiss Cup ===
22 September 1973 Round of 32	Biel-Bienne	1–2	Basel	Gurzelen Stadion, Biel/Bienne
20:15	Peters 30' (1:0)	Summary	31' (1:1) Hitzfeld; 46' (1:2) Demarmels	Attendance: 7,300; Referee: (Switzerland) Fernand Burioli Lausanne

6 October 1973 Round of 16	Mendrisiostar	1–4	Basel	Centro Sportivo Comunale, Mendrisio
14:45	Bianchi (1:4)	Summary	9' (0:1) Stohler; 41' (0:2) Paolucci; 62' (0:3) Cubillas; 75' (0:4) Cubillas	Attendance: 3,000; Referee: (Switzerland) Roland Keller Bern

31 October 1973 Quarter-final; First leg	Sion	1–0	Basel	Stade Tourbillon, Sion
	Lopez 57' (1:0)	Summary		Attendance: 6,000; Referee: (Switzerland) Gérard Racine Biel/Bienne

4 November 1973 Quarter-final; Second leg	Basel	2–2 (2 – 3 agg.)	Sion	St. Jakob Stadium, Basel
18:00	Hitzfeld 4' (1:0); Hasler 66' (2:0)	Summary	84' (2:1) Vergères; 90' (2:2) Lopez	Attendance: 8,000; Referee: (Switzerland) Jean Dubach Nidau

=== Swiss League Cup ===
11 August 1973 Round of 16	Neuchâtel Xamax	4–1	Basel	Stade de la Maladière, Neuchâtel
20:15	Rub 10' (1:0); Citherlet 29' (2:1); Richard (yellow card) 33'; Elsig 38' (3:1); Richard 68' (4:1)	Summary	(yellow card) 3' Hitzfeld; 15' (1:1) Rahmen	Attendance: 6,000; Referee: (Switzerland) André Favre Echallens

=== European Cup ===
18 September 1973 First round First leg	Fram (Iceland)	0 – 5	(Switzerland) Basel	St. Jakob Stadium, Basel
20:00		UEFA summary FCB summary	2' (1:0) Cubillas; 21' (2:0) Balmer; 75' (3:0) Hasler; 85' (4:0) Balmer; 88' (5:0) Demarmels	Attendance: 8,500; Referee: (Hungary) Sandor Petri
Note: Fram home game

20 September 1973 First round Second leg	Basel (Switzerland)	6 – 2 (11 – 2 agg.)	(Iceland) Fram	Kleinholz Stadion, Olten
20:00	Tanner 4' (0:1); Cubillas 24' (0:2); Geirsson 39' (o.g. 0:3); Tanner 56' (1:4); Wampfler 60' (1:5); Stohler 66' (pen. 1:6)	UEFA summary FCB summary	52' (1:3) Leifsson; 78' (2:6) Elíasson	Attendance: 5,500; Referee: (Hungary) Karoly Palotai
Note: Home game of FCB. Organised by FC Olten

24 October 1973 Second round First leg	Club Brugge (Belgium)	2 – 1	(Switzerland) Basel	Jan Breydel Stadium, Sint-Andries, Bruges
	Carteus 7' (1:0); Thio 60' (pen. 2:1)	UEFA summary FCB summary	(yellow card) 28' Wampfler; (yellow card) 36' Mundschin; 39' (pen. 1:1) Odermatt; (yellow card) 71' Demarmels	Attendance: 23,000; Referee: (Republic of Ireland) John Carpenter

7 November 1973 Second round Second leg	Basel (Switzerland)	6 – 4 (7 – 6 agg.)	(Belgium) Club Brugge	St. Jakob Stadium, Basel
20:00	Rüssmann 19' (o.g. 1:0); Balmer 31' (2:2); Wampfler 37' (3:2); Hitzfeld 63' (pen. 4:3); Hitzfeld 70' (5:4); Hitzfeld 87' (6:4)	UEFA summary FCB summary	23' (1:1) Lambert; 28' (1:2) Carteus; 46' (pen. 3:3) Lambert; 68' (4:4) Lambert; (yellow card) 84' Geels; (yellow card) 87' Bastjins	Attendance: 12,500; Referee: (Denmark) B. Nielsen

27 February 1974 Quarter-final; First leg	FC Basel (Switzerland)	3 – 2	(Scotland) Celtic	St. Jakob Stadium, Basel
20:00	Hitzfeld 28' (1:1); Odermatt 31' (2:1); Demarmels (yellow card) 54'; Hitzfeld 64' (pen. 3:2)	UEFA summary FCB summary	21' (0:1) Wilson; 57' (2:2) Dalglish	Attendance: 25,000; Referee: (East Germany) Günter Männig

20 March 1974 Quarter-final; Second leg	Celtic (Scotland)	4 – 2 (a.e.t.) (6 – 5 agg.)	(Switzerland) FC Basel	Celtic Park, Glasgow
20:00	Dalglish 14' (1:0); Deans 18' (2:0); Hood (yellow card) 43'; Callaghan 62' (3:2); Murray 114'	UEFA summary FCB summary	33' (2:1) Mundschin; (yellow card) 36' Tanner; 48' (2:2) Balmer	Attendance: 71,000; Referee: (France) Michel Kitabidjan

=== Coppa delle Alpi ===
==== Group B matches ====
16 June 1973 Round 1	Stade de Reims (France)	4–1	(Switzerland) Basel	Stade Auguste-Delaune, Reims
20:30	Bianchi 21'; Simon 44'; Onnis 70'; Bianchi 87'	Summary	40' Cubillas	Attendance: 5,500; Referee: (Switzerland) André Favre, Échallens

19 June 1973 Round 2	Strasbourg (France)	1–1	(Switzerland) Basel	Stade de la Meinau, Strasbourg
	Halichodzig 17' (pen.)	Summary	11' Hitzfeld	Attendance: 2,000; Referee: (Switzerland) Marcel Despland

23 June 1973 Round 3	Basel (Switzerland)	3–1	(France) Stade de Reims	St. Jakob Stadium Basel
20:00	Paolucci 30'; Wenger 33'; Balmer 38'	Summary	31' Omnis	Attendance: 1,800; Referee: (France) Robert Helies

26 June 1973 Round 4	Basel (Switzerland)	2–0	(France) Strasbourg	St. Jakob Stadium Basel
20:00	Balmer 10'; Kiefer (yellow card) 71'; Odermatt	Summary	(yellow card) 30' Zamojski	Attendance: 6,000; Referee: (France) Michel Kitabidjan

NB: teams did not play compatriots

==== Group B standings ====
Pos	Team	Pld	W	D	L	GF	GA	GD	BP	Pts	
1	Servette	4	3	0	1	10	6	+4	1	7 (Note: 1 bonus point awarded for victory by 3 or more goals)	Advance to final
2	Stade de Reims	4	2	0	2	9	9	0	2	6	
3	Basel	4	2	1	1	7	6	+1	0	5	
4	Strasbourg	4	0	1	3	3	8	−5	0	1	

Source: RSSSF.COM

== See also ==
- History of FC Basel
- List of FC Basel players
- List of FC Basel seasons

== Sources ==
- Rotblau: Jahrbuch Saison 2015/2016. Publisher: FC Basel Marketing AG. ISBN 978-3-7245-2050-4
- Die ersten 125 Jahre. Publisher: Josef Zindel im Friedrich Reinhardt Verlag, Basel. ISBN 978-3-7245-2305-5
- Verein "Basler Fussballarchiv" Homepage
- Switzerland 1973–74 at RSSSF
- Swiss League Cup at RSSSF
- Cup of the Alps 1973 at RSSSF
