= 1970–71 FC Basel season =

FC Basel
1970–71 season
- Chairman: Félix Musfeld
- Manager: Helmut Benthaus
- Ground: St. Jakob Stadium, Basel
- Nationalliga A: Runner-up
- Swiss Cup: Quarter-finals
- European Cup: Round 2
- Cup of the Alps: Winners
- Top goalscorer: League: Walter Balmer (13); All: Karl Odermatt (16)
- Highest home attendance: 36'000 on 10 October 1970 vs. Zürich
- Lowest home attendance: 9,500 on 8 November 1970 vs. Sion
- Average home league attendance: 17.384

The 1970–71 season was Fussball Club Basel 1893's 77th season in their existence. It was their 25th consecutive season in the top flight of Swiss football after their promotion the season 1945–46. They played their home games in the St. Jakob Stadium.

== Overview ==
=== Pre-season ===
For the sixth consecutive season Helmut Benthaus was player-manager. There were only very few changes in the squad. Bruno Michaud retired from active football after winning his third championship title. He had played 16 seasons in the Nationalliga A, 14 of these were with Basel and two with Lausanne-Sport. During his time with Basel Michaud played a total of 355 competitive games and scored 22 goals. Dieter Rüefli moved on to play for St. Gallen and Janos Konrad moved on to Vevey-Sports. In the other direction Edoardo Manzoni joined the squad on loan from Xamax. Benthaus did not want any other transfers and relied on young players who came up from the reserve team to help, when needed in the first team. Basel played a total of 55 matches during this season. 27 of these games were in the domestic league including the play-off for the championship. Three of these games were in the Swiss Cup, four were in the European Cup, five were in the Cup of the Alps and 16 were friendly matches. Of these 16 test games 13 were won and three were drawn. Five test matches were played at home and 11 played away.

=== Domestic league ===
14 teams contested in the 1970–71 Nationalliga A. These were the top 12 teams from the previous 1969–70 season and the two newly promoted teams Sion and Luzern. The championship was played in a double round robin. The champions would qualify for the 1971–72 European Cup and the last two teams in the league table at the end of the season were to be relegated. Basel won 18 of their 26 league games, drawing six, losing just twice, they scored 67 goals conceding 26. They finished the regular season level on points with Grasshopper Club Zürich and so these two teams had to contest a play-off game on 8 June 1971 to decide the title winners. Grasshopper won the play-off 4–3 after extra time. Walter Balmer was Basel's top goal scorer with 13 league goals and Karl Odermatt second top scorer with 12 league goals. Peter Wenger scored 10, Helmut Hauser managed 9 and Jürgen Sundermann scored 8 league goals. Bellinzona finished last and the table and were relegated. Sion and Fribourg, level on points, were both second last and thus they had to have a play-off against relegation. Sion won 1–0, so Fribourg were relegated.

=== Swiss Cup ===
On 1 November 1969 Basel started in the Swiss Cup in the round of 32 with a 5–1 home win against CS Chênois. In the round of 16 played on 29 November Basel had a home match against Bellinzona which was won 2–0. In the quarter-final, played on 28 February 1971, Basel had an away tie against Mendrisiostar (after club merger later renamed FC Mendrisio-Stabio). However, this was lost 0–2 after extra time. Servette won the cup competition at the end of the season, winning the final at the Wankdorf Stadium 2–0 against Lugano.

=== European Cup ===
In the European Cup Basel were drawn against Spartak Moscow. The first leg, which was played on 16 September 1970 away from home, was lost 2–3 with Odermatt and Benthaus scoring for the guests during the last 12 minutes, after they had gone three down with just a quarter of an hour left to play. In the second leg played in the St. Jakob Stadium Basel won 2–1, the goals being scored by Siegenthaler und Walter Balmer. Thus the tie ended 4–4 on aggregate. Basel won on away goals and advanced to the second round. Here they were drawn against Ajax, first away from home, but they suffered a 0–3 defeat. The second leg at home also ended with a defeat, 1–2, despite the fact that Odermatt put Basel one up with a penalty after 36 minutes.

=== Cup of the Alps ===
In the 1970 Cup of the Alps Basel were in the Swiss Group together with Lugano, Young Boys and Zürich. They played against each of the four Italian teams Fiorentina, Lazio, Sampdoria and Bari. Basel won the Swiss group and in the final they faced and beat Fiorentina 3–2.

== Players ==
Note: Flags indicate national team as defined under FIFA eligibility rules; some limited exceptions apply. Players may hold more than one non-FIFA nationality.

| No. | Pos. | Nation | Player |
|---|---|---|---|
| 1 | GK | SUI | Marcel Kunz |
| 1 | GK | FRA | Jean-Paul Laufenburger |
| 2 | DF | SUI | Paul Fischli |
| 3 | DF | SUI | Walter Mundschin |
| 4 | MF | SUI | Peter Ramseier |
| 5 | MF | SUI | Urs Siegenthaler |
| 6 | MF | GER | Jürgen Sundermann |
| 7 | FW | SUI | Walter Balmer |
| 8 | MF | SUI | Karl Odermatt |
| 9 | MF | SUI | Bruno Rahmen |
| 10 | MF | GER | Helmut Benthaus |
| 11 | FW | SUI | Peter Wenger |

| No. | Pos. | Nation | Player |
|---|---|---|---|
| — | GK | SUI | Roland Dahinden (reserves) |
| — | DF | GER | Josef Kiefer |
| — | MF | SUI | Edoardo Manzoni (loan from Xamax) |
| — | DF | SUI | Roland Paolucci |
| — | DF | SUI | Jörg Stohler |
| — | DF | SUI | Alex Wirth (reserves) |
| — | DF | SUI | Guy Castelan (reserves) |
| — | MF | SUI | Otto Demarmels |
| — | MF | GER | Stefan Reisch |
| — | MF | SUI | Rolf Riner |
| — | FW | GER | Helmut Hauser |

Players who left the squad

Note: Flags indicate national team as defined under FIFA eligibility rules; some limited exceptions apply. Players may hold more than one non-FIFA nationality.

| No. | Pos. | Nation | Player |
|---|---|---|---|
| — | FW | SUI | Dieter Rüefli (to St. Gallen) |

| No. | Pos. | Nation | Player |
|---|---|---|---|
| — | DF | SUI | Bruno Michaud (retired) |
| — | FW | HUN | Janos Konrad (to Vevey-Sports) |

== Results ==
Legend

Win Draw Loss Postponed

=== Friendly matches ===
==== Pre-season ====
| 19 July 1970 Pre-season | FC Schalke 04 (West Germany) | 0–0 | (Switzerland) Basel | Langensteinstadion, Waldshut |
| | | Summary | | Attendance: 5,200; Referee: (West Germany) Robert Heyn |

| 22 July 1970 Pre-season | Basel (Switzerland) | 1–0 | (West Germany) Freiburger FC | Landhof, Basel |
| 18:15 | Wenger 7' (1:0) | Summary | | Attendance: 2,200; Referee: (Switzerland) Haldimann Biel/Bienne |

| 27 July 1970 Pre-season | FV Lörrach (West Germany) | 1–5 | (Switzerland) Basel | Stadtstadion Lörrach |
| | Förster 28' (1:1) | Summary | 21' (0:1) Balmer; 32' (1:2) Manzoni; 54' (1:3) Ramseier; 63' (1:4) Wenger; 75' (1:5) Wenger | Attendance: 2,000; Referee: (West Germany) Kurt Woldrich |

| 29 July 1970 Pre-season | Basel (Switzerland) | 2–1 | (France) RC Strasbourg | Landhof, Basel |
| 18:15 | Wenger 2' (1:0); Wenger 71' (2:1) | Summary | 7' (pen. 1:1) Lemée; (yellow card) 50' Kaniber | Attendance: 2,500; Referee: (Switzerland) Ernst Dörflinger Basel |

| 2 August 1970 Pre-season | Basel (Switzerland) | 2–2 | (Switzerland) Xamax | Weiden Dornach |
| 16:30 | Hauser 60' (1:1); Sundermann 84' (2:1) | Summary | 54' (0:1) Brunnenmeier; 86' (2:2) Rub | Attendance: 1,500; Referee: (Switzerland) Jean Dubach Nidau |

| 5 August 1970 Uhrencup | Grenchen (Switzerland) | 0–4 | (Switzerland) Basel | Stadion Brühl, Grenchen |
| 20:00 | | Summary | 46' (0:1) Ramseier; 52' (0:2) Wenger; 67' (0:3) Balmer; 73' (0:4) Odermatt | Attendance: 1,200; Referee: (Switzerland) Rudolf Rettig Gerlafingen |

| 8 August 1970 Uhrencup | Basel (Switzerland) | 5–5 (8 – 7 p) | (Switzerland) Young Boys | Stadion Brühl, Grenchen |
| 20:00 | Wenger 14' (1:0); Reisch 21' (2:1); Balmer 24' (3:1); Odermatt 57' (4:4); Balmer 68' (5:4) | Summary | 17' (1:1) Allemann; 46' (2:2) Schild; 49' (3:3) Theunissen; 55' (3:4) Kvicinsky; 85' (5:5) Müller | Attendance: 6,000; Referee: (Switzerland) Rudolf Scheurer Bettlach |
| | Penalties |
| | Sundermann (penalty scored) (penalty scored) (penalty scored) (penalty scored) (penalty missed); Sundermann (penalty scored) (penalty scored) (penalty scored) (penalty scored) (penalty missed) | | (penalty scored) (penalty scored) (penalty scored) (penalty scored) (penalty missed) Allemann; (penalty scored) (penalty scored) (penalty scored) (penalty missed) (penalty missed) Allemann |

| 12 August 1970 Pre-season | Basel (Switzerland) | 5–2 | (West Germany) Tennis Borussia Berlin | St. Jakob Stadium, Basel |
| 20:00 | Wenger 5' (1:0); Hauser 26' (2:0); Hauser 29' (3:0); Hauser 86' (4:2); Hauser 90' (5:2) | Summary | 37' (3:1) Eggert; 58' (3:2) Görs | Attendance: 6,000; Referee: (Switzerland) Karl Göppel Zürich |

==== Winter break ====
| 15 January 1971 Winter break | Royal Bangkok Sports Club (Thailand) | 0–15 | (Switzerland) Basel | Bangkok |
| | | Summary | (4x) Hauser (3x) Balmer (3x) Odermatt (2x) Demarmels (2x) Wenger (1x) Paolucci |

| 20 January 1971 Winter break | Queen-Stars Bangkok (Thailand) | 1–3 | (Switzerland) Basel | Bangkok |
| | Reisch (o.g.) | Summary | Odermatt; Demarmels; Wenger | Attendance: 8,000 |

| 7 February 1971 Winter break | Basel (Switzerland) | 5–1 | (Switzerland) Xamax | St. Jakob Stadium Landhof, Basel |
| 14:30 | Hauser 34' (1:0); Hauser 65' (2:0); Balmer 63' (3:0); Hauser 68' (4:0); Hauser 90' (5:1) | Summary | 84' (4:1) Krömer | Attendance: 1,000; Referee: (Switzerland) Peter Hänggi Aesch |

| 14 February 1971 Winter break | Wettingen (Switzerland) | 0–1 | (Switzerland) Basel | Stadion Altenburg, Wettingen |
| | | Summary | 85' (0:1) Hauser | Attendance: 1,700; Referee: (Switzerland) Winiger Wetzikon |

| 17 February 1971 Winter break | FC Birsfelden (Switzerland) | 1–8 | (Switzerland) Basel | Sternenfeld, Birsfelden |
| 20:00 | Kunz 35' (1:2) | Summary | 3' (0:1) Fischli; 6' (0:2) Odermatt; 36' (1:3) Reisch; 41' (1:4) Balmer; 48' (1:5) Odermatt; 51' (1:6) Odermatt; 63' (1:7) Odermatt; 70' (1:8) Wenger | Attendance: 1,100; Referee: (Switzerland) Walter Rudin Birsfelden |

| 21 February 1971 Winter break | Servette (Switzerland) | 2–2 | (Switzerland) Basel | Charmilles Stadium, Geneva |
| | Heutschi 81' (1:2); Dörfel 88' (2:2) | Summary | 8' (0:1) Odermatt; 60' (0:2) Hauser | Attendance: 4,000; Referee: (Switzerland) Gilbert Droz Marin |

| 21 March 1971 Mid-season | Basel (Switzerland) | 2–1 | (Switzerland) Grenchen | Landhof, Basel |
| 15:00 | Balmer 18' (1:0); Stohler 71' (pen. 2:1) | Summary | 30' (1:1) Braun | Referee: (Switzerland) Rudolf Renggli Luzern |

| 9 April 1971 Mid-season | Aarau (Switzerland) | 0–4 | (Switzerland) Basel | Stadion Brügglifeld, Aarau |
| | | Summary | 21' (0:1) Mundschin; 26' (0:2) Hauser; 47' (0:3) Rahmen; 70' (0:4) Rahmen | Attendance: 2,200; Referee: (Switzerland) Marcel Zürcher Wettingen |

=== Nationalliga ===
==== League matches ====
| 15 August 1970 Round 1 | Servette | 1–1 | Basel | Charmilles Stadium, Geneva |
| 17:30 | Heutschi 8' (1:1) | Summary | 6' (0:1) Ramseier | Attendance: 11,000; Referee: (Switzerland) Mario Clematide Zollikofen |
Note: Kick-off at 5.30 p.m. (Fêtes de Genève). Kick-off by Gina Lollobrigida.

| 28 August 1970 Round 2 | Lugano | 1–1 | Basel | Cornaredo, Lugano |
| 20:30 | Manzoni (yellow card) 30'; Berset 75' (1:1); Berset (yellow card) 80' | Summary | 14' (0:1) Mundschin | Attendance: 8,000; Referee: (Switzerland) Gilbert Droz Marin |

| 29 August 1970 Round 3 | Basel | 3–1 | Grasshopper Club | St. Jakob Stadium, Basel |
| 20:00 | Ramseier 22' (1:0); Hauser 36' (2:1); Balmer 55' (3:1) | Summary | 25' (1:1) Grahn | Attendance: 20,000; Referee: (Switzerland) Anton Bucheli Luzern |

| 2 September 1970 Round 4 | Basel | 5–2 | Bellinzona | St. Jakob Stadium, Basel |
| 20:00 | Odermatt (yellow card) 10'; Odermatt 21' (1:1); Wenger 40' (2:1); Rahmen 44' (3:1); Hauser 48' (4:1); Balmer 60' (5:1) | Summary | 7' (0:1) Lukaric; 87' (5:2) Gottardi | Attendance: 11,500; Referee: (Switzerland) Roland Racine Prilly |

| 6 September 1970 Round 5 | Luzern | 1–1 | Basel | Stadion Allmend, Luzern |
| 16:30 | Müller 90' (1:1) | Summary | 5' (0:1) Wenger | Attendance: 13,000; Referee: (Switzerland) Ulysse Darbellay Roche |

| 12 September 1970 Round 6 | Basel | 3–0 | Fribourg | St. Jakob Stadium, Basel |
| 20:00 | Sundermann 6' (pen. 1:0); Wenger 37' (2:0); Balmer 49' (3:0) | Summary | | Attendance: 10,000; Referee: (Switzerland) Josef Zibung Luzern |

| 19 September 1970 Round 7 | Biel-Bienne | 1–1 | Basel | Gurzelen Stadion, Biel/Bienne |
| 20:15 | Renfer 13' (1:0) | Summary | 31' (1:1) Reisch | Attendance: 11,000; Referee: (Switzerland) Claudio Laich Massagno |

| 26 September 1970 Round 8 | Basel | 5–3 | Lausanne-Sport | St. Jakob Stadium, Basel |
| 20:00 | Wenger 3' (1:0); Hauser 7' (2:0); Wenger 37' (3:3); Wenger 48' (4:3); Odermatt 58' (5:3) | Summary | 30' (2:1) Hosp; 31' (2:2) Vuilleumier; 32' (2:3) Weibel; (yellow card) 45' Dürr | Attendance: 23,000; Referee: (Switzerland) Walter Gallmann Oberrieden |

| 3 October 1970 Round 9 | La Chaux-de-Fonds | 0–1 | Basel | Stade Charrière, La Chaux-de-Fonds |
| 17:00 | | Summary | 12' (0:1) Balmer; (yellow card) 37' Reisch | Attendance: 5,000; Referee: (Switzerland) Bruno Della Bruna Lumino |

| 10 October 1970 Round 10 | Basel | 4–2 | Zürich | St. Jakob Stadium, Basel |
| 20:00 | Sundermann 44' (pen. 1:2); Benthaus 48' (2:2); Odermatt 67' (3:2); Mundschin 90' (4:2) | Summary | 4' (0:1) Künzli; 37' (0:2) Volkert | Attendance: 36,000; Referee: (Switzerland) Mario Clematide Zollikofen |

| 24 October 1970 Round 11 | Winterthur | 2–1 | Basel | Schützenwiese, Winterthur |
| 20:00 | Dimmler 9' (pen. 1:0); Rutschmann 82' (2:1); Zigerlig (yellow card) | Summary | 81' (1:1) Reisch; (yellow card) Reisch; (yellow card) Paolucci | Attendance: 9,500; Referee: (Switzerland) Ulysse Darbellay Roche |

| 8 November 1970 Round 12 | Basel | 2–0 | Sion | St. Jakob Stadium, Basel |
| 14:30 | Odermatt 52' (1:0); Wenger 88' (2:0) | Summary | (yellow card) 26' Delay | Attendance: 9,500; Referee: (Switzerland) Claudio Laich Massagno |

| 22 November 1970 Round 13 | Young Boys | 1–6 | Basel | Wankdorf Stadium, Bern |
| 14:30 | Allemann 70' (1:4) | Summary | 31' (0:1) Odermatt; 38' (0:2) Sundermann; 45' (0:3) Paolucci; 63' (0:4) Wenger; 84' (1:5) Balmer; 89' (1:3) Wenger | Attendance: 14,000; Referee: (Switzerland) Pius Kamber Zürich |

| 6 December 1970 Round 14 | Basel | 2–2 | Servette | St. Jakob Stadium, Basel |
| 14:30 | Sundermann 10' (1:0); Sundermann 60' (2:2) | Summary | 13' (1:1) Heutschi; 44' (1:2) Blanchoud | Attendance: 15,000; Referee: (Switzerland) Anton Bucheli Luzern |

| 7 March 1971 Round 15 | Basel | 4–1 | Lugano | St. Jakob Stadium, Basel |
| 14:30 | Odermatt 20' (pen. 1:0); Odermatt (yellow card) 57'; Odermatt 63' (2:0); Balmer 78' (3:0); Odermatt 82' (4:0) | Summary | (yellow card) 19' Coduri; (red card) 54' Pullica; 87' (o.g. 4:1) Fischli | Attendance: 13,000; Referee: (Switzerland) Rudolf Scheurer Bettlach |

| 14 March 1971 Round 16 | Grasshopper Club | 2–1 | Basel | Hardturm, Zürich |
| 14:30 | Gröbli 29' (1:0); Grahn 48' (2:1) | Summary | 30' (1:1) Odermatt; (yellow card) 63' Fischli | Attendance: 20,000; Referee: (Switzerland) |

| 21 March 1971 Round 17 | Bellinzona | PP | Basel | Stadio Comunale Bellinzona |
| | | [ Summary] |

| 28 March 1971 Round 18 | Basel | 5–0 | Luzern | St. Jakob Stadium, Basel |
| 15:00 | Hauser 26' (1:0); Mundschin 39' (2:0); Sundermann 60' (3:0); Balmer 89' (4:0); Balmer 90+1' (5:0) | Summary | | Attendance: 11,500; Referee: (Switzerland) Marcel Despland Yverdon |

| 4 April 1971 Round 19 | Fribourg | 2–3 | Basel | Stade Universitaire Saint-Léonard, Fribourg |
| 15:00 | Cremona 37' (1:3); Schaller 53' (2:3) | Summary | 13' (0:1) Balmer; 19' (0:2) Demarmels; 24' (0:3) Hauser | Attendance: 6,000; Referee: (Switzerland) Walter Gallmann Oberrieden |

| 17 April 1971 Round 20 | Basel | 2–0 | Biel-Bienne | St. Jakob Stadium, Basel |
| 20:00 | Sundermann 62' (1:0); Wenger 71' (2:0) | Summary | | Attendance: 13,000; Referee: (Switzerland) Werner Mettler St. Gallen |

| 24 April 1971 Round 21 | Lausanne-Sport | 2–2 | Basel | Olympique de la Pontaise, Lausanne |
| 20:30 | Zappella 15' (1:0); Vuilleumier 58' (2:1) | Summary | 25' (1:1) Balmer; (yellow card) 70' Fischli; 77' (2:2) Demarmels | Attendance: 11,000; Referee: (Switzerland) Claudio Laich Massagno |

| 1 May 1971 Round 22 | Basel | 2–0 | La Chaux-de-Fonds | St. Jakob Stadium, Basel |
| 20:00 | Balmer 2' (1:0); Hauser 15' (2:0) | Summary | (yellow card) Jeandupeux; (yellow card) 85' Chiandussi | Attendance: 11,000; Referee: (Switzerland) Mario Clematide Zollikofen |

| 16 May 1971 Round 23 | Zürich | 0–1 | Basel | Letzigrund, Zürich |
| 15:40 | | Summary | 55' (0:1) Hauser | Attendance: 16,000; Referee: (Switzerland) Fernand Burioli Lausanne |

| 22 May 1971 Round 24 | Basel | 5–0 | Winterthur | St. Jakob Stadium, Basel |
| 20:00 | Mundschin 7' (1:0); Odermatt 26' (2:0); Balmer 30' (3:0); Riner 49' (4:0); Hauser 53' (5:0) | Summary | (yellow card) 53' Bollmann | Attendance: 18,500; Referee: (Switzerland) Jean Dubach Nidau |

| 26 May 1971 Round 17 | Bellinzona | 0–2 | Basel | Stadio Comunale Bellinzona |
| 20:30 | | Summary | 56' (0:1) Balmer; 79' (pen. 0:2) Odermatt | Attendance: 2,000; Referee: (Switzerland) Walter Hungerbühler St. Gallen |

| 29 May 1971 Round 25 | Sion | 0–1 | Basel | Stade Tourbillon, Sion |
| 20:15 | Wampfler (yellow card) 78' | Summary | 76' (0:1) Hauser; (yellow card) 78' Fischli | Attendance: 8,000; Referee: (Switzerland) Rudolf Scheurer Bettlach |

| 5 June 1971 Round 26 | Basel | 3–2 | Young Boys | St. Jakob Stadium, Basel |
| 20:15 | Sundermann 51' (1:1); Ramseier 54' (2:1); Odermatt 61' (3:1) | Summary | 17' (0:1) Müller; 64' (3:2) Müller | Attendance: 34,000; Referee: (Switzerland) Marcel Despland Yverdon |

==== League standings ====
| Pos | Team | Pld | W | D | L | GF | GA | GD | Pts | Qualification or relegation |
|---|---|---|---|---|---|---|---|---|---|---|
| 1 | FC Basel | 26 | 18 | 6 | 2 | 67 | 26 | +41 | 42 | Championship play-off |
| 2 | Grasshopper Club Zürich (C) | 26 | 20 | 2 | 4 | 59 | 21 | +38 | 42 | Championship play-off winners, thus qualified for 1971–72 European Cup and entered 1971 Intertoto Cup |
| 3 | FC Lugano | 26 | 11 | 9 | 6 | 50 | 34 | +16 | 31 | Entered 1971 Intertoto Cup |
| 4 | Lausanne Sports | 26 | 12 | 6 | 8 | 51 | 43 | +8 | 30 | |
| 5 | FC Zürich | 26 | 11 | 6 | 9 | 41 | 42 | −1 | 28 | Entered 1971 Intertoto Cup |
| 6 | FC Winterthur | 26 | 11 | 5 | 10 | 36 | 38 | −2 | 27 | |
| 7 | Servette FC Genève | 26 | 8 | 10 | 8 | 39 | 36 | +3 | 26 | Swiss Cup winners, qualified for 1971–72 Cup Winners' Cup and entered 1971 Intertoto Cup |
| 8 | BSC Young Boys | 26 | 10 | 6 | 10 | 43 | 46 | −3 | 26 | |
| 9 | FC La Chaux-de-Fonds | 26 | 9 | 6 | 11 | 46 | 47 | −1 | 24 | |
| 10 | FC Biel-Bienne | 26 | 6 | 9 | 11 | 32 | 43 | −11 | 21 | |
| 11 | FC Lucerne | 26 | 8 | 4 | 14 | 39 | 48 | −9 | 20 | |
| 12 | FC Sion | 26 | 5 | 9 | 12 | 32 | 46 | −14 | 19 | Relegation play-off winners |
| 13 | FC Fribourg (R) | 26 | 6 | 7 | 13 | 35 | 63 | −28 | 19 | Relegation play-off losers, relegated to Nationalliga B |
| 14 | AC Bellinzona (R) | 26 | 1 | 7 | 18 | 24 | 61 | −37 | 9 | Relegated to Nationalliga B |

Source: rsssf.com
(C) Champions; (R) Relegated

==== Championship play-off ====
| 8 June 1971 Play-off | Grasshopper | 4–3 (a.e.t.) | Basel | Wankdorf, Bern |
| | Ohlhauser 16'; Ove Grahn 75', 97'; Peter Meier 106' | Summary | Mundschin 21'; Wenger 70'; Benthaus 119' (pen.) | Attendance: 51,000; Referee: (Switzerland) Ulysse Darbellay Roche |

=== Swiss Cup ===
| 1 November 1969 Round of 32 | Basel | 5–1 | CS Chênois | Basel |
| 14:45 | Sundermann (penalty missed) 3′ Demarmels 16' (1:1); Odermatt 47' (pen. 2:1); Odermatt 57' (3:1); Sundermann 60' (4:1); Paolucci 68' (4:1) | Summary | 11' (0:1) Liechti | Stadium: St. Jakob Stadium; Attendance: 5,400; Referee: (Switzerland) Bruno Della Bruna Lumino |

| 29 November 1969 Round of 16 | Basel | 2–0 | Bellinzona | Basel |
| 14:30 | Balmer 56' (1:0); Wenger 73' (2:0) | Summary | | Stadium: St. Jakob Stadium; Attendance: 10,700; Referee: (Switzerland) Gérard Racine Biel/Bienne |

| 28 February 1971 Quarter-final | Mendrisiostar | 2–0 (a.e.t.) | Basel | Mendrisio |
| | Tomljenovic 96' (1:0); Allio 119' (2:0) | Summary | | Stadium: Centro Sportivo Comunale, Mendrisio; Attendance: 4,000; Referee: (Switzerland) Ulysse Darbellay Roche |

=== European Cup ===
First round

| 16 September 1970 First leg | Spartak Moscow (Soviet Union) | 3 – 2 | (Switzerland) Basel | Luzhniki Stadium, Moscow |
| | Osyanin 17' (1:0); Osyanin 66' (2:0); Papayev 76' (3:0) | UEFA Summary; FCB Summary | Odermatt 78' (3:1); Benthaus 83' (3:2) | Attendance: 80,000; Referee: (England) Jim Finney |

| 30 September 1970 Second leg | Basel (Switzerland) | 2 – 1 (4 – 4 agg.) | (Soviet Union) Spartak Moscow | St. Jakob Stadium, Basel |
| | Siegenthaler 48'; Balmer 55'; Fischli (yellow card) 58' | UEFA Summary; FCB Summary | Khusainov 84' | Attendance: 44,000; Referee: (Austria) Ferdinand Marschall |

Spartak Moscow 4–4 Basel on aggregate. Basel won on away goals.

Second round

| 21 October 1970 First leg | Ajax (Netherlands) | 3 – 0 | (Switzerland) Basel | Olympic Stadium (Amsterdam) |
| | Keizer 17' van Dijk 23'; Hulshoff 63' | UEFA Summary; FCB Summary | | Attendance: 42,000; Referee: (Bulgaria) Petar Nikolov |

| 4 November 1970 Second leg | Basel (Switzerland) | 1 – 2 | (Netherlands) Ajax | St. Jakob Stadium, Basel |
| 20:00 | Odermatt 36' (pen.) | UEFA Summary; FCB Summary | Rijnders 69'; Neeskens 72' | Attendance: 31,000; Referee: (Republic of Ireland) Derry Barrett |

Ajax won 5–1 on aggregate.

=== Coppa delle Alpi ===
==== Matches ====
| 6 June 1970 Round 1 | Basel (Switzerland) | 4 – 1 | (Italy) Bari | St. Jakob Stadium, Basel |
| 20:00 | Paolucci 22' (1:0); Sundermann 33' (pen. 2:0); Rahmen 68' (3:1); Reisch 87' (4:1) | Summary | 53' (2:1) Fara | Attendance: 7,000; Referee: (Switzerland) Pius Kamber Zürich |

| 9 June 1970 Round 2 | Basel (Switzerland) | 2 – 1 | (Italy) Sampdoria | St. Jakob Stadium, Basel |
| 20:00 | Sundermann 19'; Riner 35' (2:1) | Summary | 4' (0:1) Francesconi | Attendance: 6,500; Referee: (Italy) Cesare Gussoni |

| 13 June 1970 Round 3 | Fiorentina (Italy) | 3 – 3 | (Switzerland) Basel | Letzigrund, Zürich |
| 20:00 | Mariani 61' (1:0); Galdiolo 70' (2:0); Mariani 84' | Summary | 71' (2:1) Hauser; 87' (3:2) Hauser; 88' (3:3) Mundschin | Attendance: 12,000; Referee: (Switzerland) Othmar Huber Thun |

| 16 June 1970 Round 4 | Basel (Switzerland) | 3 – 2 | (Italy) Lazio | St. Jakob Stadium, Basel |
| 20:00 | Wenger 72' (1:1); Wenger 73' (2:1); Wenger 85' (3:1) | Summary | 71' (1:0) Chinaglia; 90+4' (pen. 3:2) Chinaglia | Attendance: 6,000; Referee: (Italy) Luciano Giunti |

==== Standings Swiss teams ====
| Pos | Team | Pld | W | D | L | GF | GA | GD | Pts | |
|---|---|---|---|---|---|---|---|---|---|---|
| 1 | Basel | 4 | 3 | 1 | 0 | 12 | 7 | +5 | 7 | Advance to final |
| 2 | Lugano | 4 | 1 | 2 | 1 | 7 | 8 | −1 | 4 | |
| 3 | Young Boys | 4 | 1 | 1 | 2 | 6 | 5 | +1 | 3 | |
| 4 | Zürich | 4 | 1 | 0 | 3 | 9 | 10 | −1 | 2 | |

Source: https://www.rsssf.org/tablesa/alpi70.html RSSSSF.com

==== Final ====
| 19 June 1970 Final | Basel (Switzerland) | 3 – 2 | (Italy) Fiorentina | St. Jakob Stadium Basel |
| 20:00 | Hauser 15' (1:0); Wenger 19' (2:0); Wenger 76' (3:1) | Summary | 30' (2:1) Longoni; 77' (3:2) Esposito; (red card) 90+3' Maraschi | Attendance: 13,000; Referee: (France) René Vigliani |

== See also ==
- History of FC Basel
- List of FC Basel players
- List of FC Basel seasons

== Sources ==
- Rotblau: Jahrbuch Saison 2015/2016. Publisher: FC Basel Marketing AG. ISBN 978-3-7245-2050-4
- Die ersten 125 Jahre. Publisher: Josef Zindel im Friedrich Reinhardt Verlag, Basel. ISBN 978-3-7245-2305-5
- Verein "Basler Fussballarchiv" Homepage
- Switzerland 1970–71 at RSSSF
