= Felix Tschudin =

Swiss footballer (born 1952)

Personal information
- Full name: Felix Tschudin
- Date of birth: 19 May 1952
- Place of birth: Basel Switzerland
- Height: 1.80 m (5 ft 11 in)
- Position: Defender

Youth career
- until 1973: FC Basel

Senior career*
Years	Team	Apps	(Gls)
1973–1974	FC Basel	6	(0)
1974–1978	SC Binningen		
1980–1984	SC Regio Basel		
1985–1987	FC Münchenstein		
- * Club domestic league appearances and goals

Felix Tschudin (born 19 May 1952) is a retired Swiss footballer who played for FC Basel and SC Binningen. He later played for SC Regio Basel in the 1980s and ended his active football with local club FC Münchenstein. Tschudin played as a defender.

Tschudin played all his youth football for FC Basel. He joined their first team in 1973 and played his domestic league debut in the away game at the Charmilles Stadium, in Geneva, on 11 November 1973 as Basel won 3–2 against Servette. In this game, he received a booking for a foul on former youth teammate Rolf Riner.

In Basel's 1973–74 season Tschudin played a total of 14 games for the club scoring one goal. Six of these games were in the Nationalliga A and eight were friendly games. He scored his only goal for his club on 23 February 1974 in the friendly game at home in the Landhof against Grenchen. It was the fourth goal of the game as Basel won 6–2.

Following his season with FC Basel, Tschudin moved on to SC Binningen. He played for Binningen for four seasons (third-tier of Swiss football). But because of differences, the Swiss Football Association banned Tschudin from playing for a complete season. He thus ended his playing career with several seasons for SC Regio Basel in the early 1980s, before joining local club FC Münchenstein.

== Sources ==
- Rotblau: Jahrbuch Saison 2017/2018. Publisher: FC Basel Marketing AG. ISBN 978-3-7245-2189-1
- Die ersten 125 Jahre. Publisher: Josef Zindel im Friedrich Reinhardt Verlag, Basel. ISBN 978-3-7245-2305-5
- Verein "Basler Fussballarchiv" Homepage
