= Németkér =

Németkér Kier
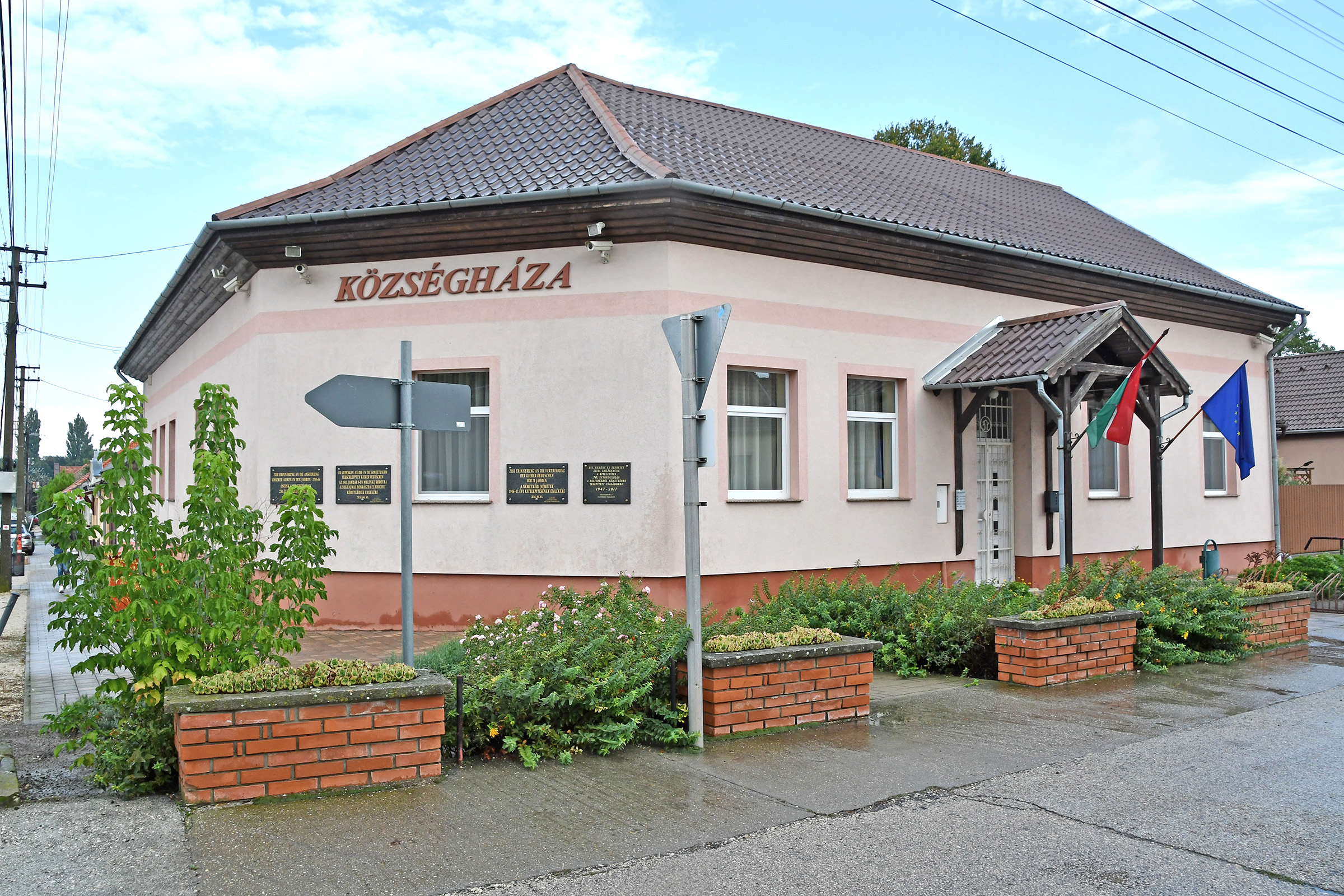
- Village hall

- Location of Tolna county in Hungary

- Location within Hungary
- Coordinates: 46°43′05″N 18°45′54″E
- Country: Hungary
- County: Tolna

Area
  - Total: 64.9 km^{2} (25.1 sq mi)

Population (2011)
  - Total: 1,681
  - Density: 25.9/km^{2} (67.1/sq mi)
- Time zone: UTC+1 (CET)
  - Summer (DST): UTC+2 (CEST)
- Postal code: 7039
- Area code: 74

Németkér (German: Kier) is a village in Tolna County, Hungary. It is located at about 100 km south of Budapest. It belongs to the small area Paks.

Németkér was founded in 1785 by the Abbey Földvár and German settlers (Danube Swabians) colonized, who had followed the call of the Habsburg monarchy, to settle the land after the completion of the Turkish wars.

After the end of the Second World War, the Danube Swabians were resettled in the American occupation zone of Germany.

== Notable people ==
- Stefan Reisch - A football player
