= Edoardo Manzoni =

Swiss-born Italian footballer (born 1947)

Personal information
- Full name: Edoardo Manzoni
- Date of birth: 20 May 1947 (age 79)
- Place of birth: Italia (Pistoia)
- Height: 1.80 m (5 ft 11 in)
- Positions: Defender; midfielder

Senior career*
Years	Team	Apps	(Gls)
1966–1973	Neuchâtel Xamax	96	(37)
1970	→ FC Basel (loan)	6	(0)
1971–1972	→ Servette FC (loan)	17	(2)
1973–1978	AC Bellinzona	122	(44)
1978–1984	FC Chiasso	127	(14)
- * Club domestic league appearances and goals

Edoardo Manzoni (born 20 May 1947) is a Swiss retired footballer born in Italy with Italian parents. He played mainly in the position as defender, but also as midfielder in the late 1960s, 1970s and early 1980s.

Manzoni first played for Neuchâtel Xamax. He joined FC Basel's first team on a six-month loan contract during their 1970–71 season under player-manager Helmut Benthaus. After playing in seven test games, Manzoni played his domestic league debut for the club in the away game on 15 August 1970 as Basel drew 1–1 with Servette. During his short stay with the club, Manzoni played a total of 15 games for Basel scoring one goal. Six of these games were in the Nationalliga A, one in the Swiss Cup, seven were friendly games and one was in the 1970–71 European Cup at home in the St. Jakob Stadium against Spartak Moscow. He scored his one-goal during the test games.

Manzoni returned to Xamax and was later loaned for one season to Servette. In 1973 he transferred to AC Bellinzona and in 1978 he transferred FC Chiasso. He retired from active football in 1984.

== Sources ==
- Die ersten 125 Jahre. Publisher: Josef Zindel im Friedrich Reinhardt Verlag, Basel. ISBN 978-3-7245-2305-5
- Verein "Basler Fussballarchiv" Homepage
