= 1972 Swiss League Cup =

Tournament details
- Country: Switzerland
- Teams: 24

Final positions
- Champions: FC Basel
- Runners-up: FC Winterthur

Tournament statistics
- Matches played: 39

The 1972 Swiss League Cup was the inaugural Swiss League Cup competition. It was played in the summer of 1972 as a pre-season tournament to the 1972–73 Swiss football season. It was won by FC Basel who defeated FC Winterthur 4–1 in the final.

== Overview ==
The League Cup was created to allow clubs from the top two tiers to compete in a tournament in advance of the league season. There was a seeding, the top eight teams from last seasons Nationalliga A were directly qualified for the round of 16. The other six teams from the top-tier and the top ten teams from the second-tier played a qualification round. These 16 teams were divided into four regional groups, each with four teams. Within the group they played a single round-robin, after which the top two teams from each group qualified for the main competition.

The matches in the qualification were played 90 minutes and then beended. Two points were awarded for a win and one point was awarded for a draw. Based on the league table, the top two teams from each group qualified for the main competition. In the main competition the matches were played in a knockout format. In the event of a draw after 90 minutes, the match went into extra time. In the event of a draw at the end of extra time, a penalty shoot-out would decide which team qualified for the next round. No replays were foreseen.

== Qualification round ==
=== Group South ===
Pos	Team	Pld	W	D	L	GF	GA	GD	Pts	Qualification	LUG	BEL	CHI	MEN
1	Lugano	3	1	2	0	9	8	+1	4	Advanced to next round	—	–	–	–
2	Bellinzona	3	1	1	1	11	7	+4	3	Advanced to next round	4–5	—	6–1	–
3	Chiasso	3	1	1	1	5	9	−4	3		2–2	–	—	2–1
4	Mendrisiostar	3	0	2	1	4	5	−1	2		2–2	1–1	–	—

Source: RSSSF
Rules for classification: 1) Points; 2) Head-to-head points; 3) Goal difference; 4) Goals scored; 5) Draw.

=== Group East ===
Pos	Team	Pld	W	D	L	GF	GA	GD	Pts	Qualification	STG	LUZ	BRÜ	FCA
1	St. Gallen	3	3	0	0	10	3	+7	6	Advanced to next round	—	4–2	–	3–1
2	Luzern	3	2	0	1	9	4	+5	4	Advanced to next round	–	—	5–0	2–0
3	Brühl St. Gallen	3	1	0	2	1	8	−7	2		0–3	–	—	1–0
4	Aarau	3	0	0	3	1	6	−5	0		–	–	–	—

Source: RSSSF
Rules for classification: 1) Points; 2) Head-to-head points; 3) Goal difference; 4) Goals scored; 5) Draw.

=== Group West A ===
Pos	Team	Pld	W	D	L	GF	GA	GD	Pts	Qualification	LCF	CSC	VEV	XAM
1	La Chaux-de-Fonds	3	3	0	0	9	4	+5	6	Advanced to next round	—	–	–	–
2	CS Chênois	3	2	0	1	8	7	+1	4	Advanced to next round	3–5	—	1–0	–
3	Vevey-Sports	3	1	0	2	3	5	−2	2		0–2	–	—	3–2
4	Xamax	3	0	0	3	5	9	−4	0		1–2	2–4	–	—

Source: RSSSF
Rules for classification: 1) Points; 2) Head-to-head points; 3) Goal difference; 4) Goals scored; 5) Draw.

=== Group West B ===
Pos	Team	Pld	W	D	L	GF	GA	GD	Pts	Qualification	GRE	FRI	BBI	MAR
1	Grenchen	3	2	1	0	17	4	+13	5	Advanced to next round	—	–	–	–
2	Fribourg	3	2	1	0	14	6	+8	5	Advanced to next round	3–3	—	–	7–2
3	Biel-Bienne	3	1	0	2	2	8	−6	2		0–4	1–4	—	–
4	Martigny-Sports	3	0	0	3	3	18	−15	0		1–10	–	0–1	—

Source: RSSSF
Rules for classification: 1) Points; 2) Head-to-head points; 3) Goal difference; 4) Goals scored; 5) Draw.

== Round of 16 ==
=== Summary ===
Team 1	Score	Team 2
5 August 1972
Basel	8–0	Servette
Lausanne-Sport	2–0	La Chaux-de-Fonds
Grenchen	0–0 (a.e.t.) (0–3 p)	Sion
Bellinzona	0–1	Young Boys
Luzern	4–2	St. Gallen
Fribourg	0–1	Chênois
Zürich	0–2	Grasshopper Club
Winterthur	4–1	Lugano

=== Matches ===
5 August 1972
20:00

Basel	8–0	Servette
Balmer 12' (1:0); Hitzfeld 21' (2:0); Hitzfeld 25' (3:0); Stohler 49' (4:0); Stohler 57' (5:0); Wenger 73' (6:0); Riner 77' (7:0); Wenger 86' (8:0)	FCB summary Servette summary

St. Jakob Stadium, Basel
Attendance: 5,000
Referee: (Switzerland) Gérard Racine (Biel/Bienne)

5 August 1972

Bellinzona	0–1	Young Boys
	YB summary	51' (0:1) Muhmenthaler

Stadio Comunale Bellinzona, Bellinzona
Attendance: 1,200
Referee: (Switzerland) Hans Wieland (Grenchen)

5 August 1972
17:30

Zürich	0–2	Grasshopper Club
	FCZ summary	37' (pen.) Citherlet; 78' (0:2) Meier

Letzigrund, Zürich
Attendance: 7,600
Referee: (Switzerland) Walter Hungerbühler (St. Gallen)

== Quarter-finals ==
=== Summary ===
Team 1	Score	Team 2
8 August 1972
Basel	2–1 (a.e.t.)	Lausanne-Sports
Sion	3–1	Young Boys Bern
Luzern	4–1	Chênois
Grasshopper Club	1–2	Winterthur

=== Matches ===
8 August

Basel	2–1 (a.e.t.)	Lausanne-Sport
Balmer 78' (1:1); Schönebeck 120' (2:1)	FCB summary	69' (0:1) Piccand

St. Jakob Stadium, Basel
Attendance: 8,300
Referee: (Switzerland) Anton Bucheli (Luzern)

8 August 1972

Sion	3–1	Young Boys Bern
Elsig 14' (1:0); Vergères 58' (2:0); Luisier 76' (3:0)	YB summary	85' (3:1) Bruttin

Stade Tourbillon, Sion
Attendance: 2,000
Referee: Rudolf Scheurer (Bettlach, Switzerland)

8 August 1972

Luzern	4–1	Chênois
Becker 49' (1:1); Signorelli 60' (2:1); Bosco 65' (3:1); Becker 77' (4:1)	RSSSF summary	38' (0:1) Meier

Stadion Allmend, Luzern
Attendance: 2,800
Referee: (Switzerland) Bruno Della Bruna (Lumino)

8 August 1972

Grasshopper Club	1–2	Winterthur
Elsener 79' (1:2)	RSSSF summary	40' (0:1) Nielsen; 67' (0:2) Meyer

Hardturm, Zürich
Attendance: 2,600
Referee: (Switzerland) André Favre (Echallens)

== Semi-finals ==
=== Summary ===
Team 1	Score	Team 2
11 October 1972
Basel	6–1	Sion
Luzern	0–2	Winterthur

=== Matches ===
11 October 1972

Basel	6–1	Sion
Hitzfeld 16' (1:0); Balmer 26' (2:0); Demarmels 42' (3:1); Demarmels (yellow card) 57'; Odermatt 64' (4:1); Demarmels 75' (5:1); Wenger 81' (6:1)	FCB summary	26' (2:1) Hermann; (yellow card) 47' Valentini; (yellow card) 47' Wampfler; (yellow card) 76' Barberis

St. Jakob Stadium, Basel
Attendance: 5,500
Referee: (Switzerland) Anton Bucheli (Luzern)

11 October 1972

Luzern	0–2	Winterthur
	RSSSF summary	31' (0:1) Wanner; 54' (0:2) Odermatt

Stadion Allmend, Luzern
Attendance: 4,400
Referee: (Switzerland) Bruno Della Bruna (Lumino)

== Final ==
The final took place on 11 November 1972 at Letzigrund in Zürich

=== Summary ===
Team 1	Score	Team 2
11 November 1972
Basel	4–1	Winterthur

=== Telegram ===
11 November 1972
14:30

Basel	4–1	FC Winterthur
Hitzfeld 6' (1:0); Hitzfeld 22' (2:0); Balmer 40' (3:1); Hitzfeld 90' (pen. 4:1)	FCB summary	25' (2:1) Nielsen

Letzigrund, Zürich
Attendance: 7,600
Referee: (Switzerland) Jean Dubach (Nidau)

Basel won the very first Swiss Football League Cup. Swiss Football Association (ASF/SFV) president Lucien Schmidlin presented the trophy to Captain Karl Odermatt.

== Further in Swiss football ==
- 1972–73 Nationalliga A
- 1972–73 Swiss Cup
- 1972–73 Swiss 1. Liga
