= Alex Wirth =

Swiss footballer and tradesman (born 1953)

Personal information
- Full name: Alex Wirth
- Date of birth: 1 April 1953 (age 73)
- Place of birth: Basel, Switzerland
- Position: Defender

Youth career
- until 1973: FC Basel

Senior career*
Years	Team	Apps	(Gls)
1970–1978	FC Basel	7	(0)
- * Club domestic league appearances and goals

Alex Wirth (born 1 April 1953) is a Swiss retired footballer and tradesman. Wirth played for FC Basel as a defender in the 1970s. He was the owner a cheese specialty shop and renowned as a cheese connoisseur.

== Football career ==
Wirth played his youth football with FC Basel (FCB). He joined the club's first team in its 1970–71 season under head coach Helmut Benthaus. Due to his age, however, Wirth played mainly with the Inter-A-Junior team (later named U-21). In 1971, he was a member of the team that won the Swiss youth championship for the first time in FCB's history with the former professional Anton Schnider as coach. He advanced to Basel's reserve team, but was often called up to the first team and helped out in the Cup of the Alps, friendly games or domestic league when Benthaus needed a defender. Wirth played his debut for the club in the Swiss Cup home game at the St. Jakob Stadium on 29 November 1970 against Bellinzona. He came on at half time to substitute for the injured Peter Ramseier as Basel won 2–0.

Wirth played his league debut for the first team in the home game on 9 December 1973 when Basel was defeated 2–3 by Young Boys. He scored one goal for the club in a test game on 2 September 1975 when Basel won 3–0 against FV Lörrach. Later that month, he suffered a broken ankle and fibula. It took a year for the injury to recover before he could play again. This was in the Swiss Cup match on 16 October 1976 against Xamax.

Wirth stayed with the club's first team until 1978 and played a total of 25 games, scoring that one mentioned goal. Seven of these games were in the Nationalliga A, two in the Swiss Cup, seven in the Cup of the Alps and nine were friendly games.

== Private life ==
Following his footballing career with Basel, Wirth took over the dairy business that his mother and father had started in August 1957. As the "young, hopeful player" (Wirth over Wirth) broke his ankle and his fibula at a soccer match and his father suffered a heart attack, "out of necessity I started working in his business". "Learning by doing was the order of the day," he said, who now offers 150 instead of five types of cheese. "I established the reputation of the specialties." In August 2017, Wirth passed the business, named Wirth's Huus, on to his son Lucas, the third family generation.

== Sources ==
- Josef Zindel (2018). FC Basel 1893. Die ersten 125 Jahre (in German). Basel: Friedrich Reinhardt Verlag. ISBN 978-3-7245-2305-5.
- Verein FC Basel Archiv (in German)
