= Peter Wenger =

Swiss footballer (1944-2016)

Personal information
- Full name: Peter Wenger
- Date of birth: 10 April 1944
- Place of birth: Küssnacht, Switzerland
- Date of death: 23 July 2016 (aged 72)
- Place of death: Luzern, Switzerland
- Position: Outside left

Youth career
- FC Küssnacht
- –1965: Luzern

Senior career*
Years	Team	Apps	(Gls)
1965–1966	Luzern	24	(3)
1966–1974	Basel	149	(40)
1974–1980	Nordstern	122	(18)

International career
1969–1970	Switzerland	7	(0)
- * Club domestic league appearances and goals

Peter Wenger (10 April 1944 – 23 July 2016) was a Swiss international footballer.

== Career ==
=== Club ===
Wenger started his youth football with his local team in Küssnacht am Rigi. He moved to Luzern and advanced to their first team for the 1965–66 Nationalliga A season. He played as outside left and had 24 appearances, scoring three goals, but the team ended the season in second last position and suffered relegation.

Wenger then signed for FC Basel and joined their first team for their 1966–67 season under head coach Helmut Benthaus. After playing in three test games, Wenger played his domestic league debut for the club in the home game in the St. Jakob Stadium on 9 October 1966 as Basel won 3–0 against Zürich. He scored his first goal with his new team in the next home game on 29 October. It was the third goal of the match and Basel went on to win 10–0 against FC Moutier.

Wenger won the Swiss championship title that season. Basel finished the championship one point clear of FC Zürich who finished in second position. Basel won 16 of the 26 games, drawing eight, losing twice, and they scored 60 goals conceding just 20. Roberto Frigerio was the team's top goal scorer with 16 league goals, Wenger netted five times. In that season Wenger won the double with Basel. In the Cup final on 15 May 1967 Basel's opponents were Lausanne-Sports. In the former Wankdorf Stadium, Helmut Hauser scored the decisive goal via penalty. The game went down in football history due to the sit-down strike that followed this goal. After 88 minutes of play, with the score at 1–1, referee Karl Göppel awarded Basel a controversial penalty. André Grobéty had pushed Hauser gently in the back and Hauser let himself drop theatrically. Subsequently, after the 2–1 lead for Basel the Lausanne players refused to resume the game and they sat down demonstratively on the pitch. The referee had to abandon the match. Basel were awarded the cup with a 3–0 forfait.

In their 1968–69 season Basel finished the Nationalliga A season as champions one point ahead of Lausanne Sports in second position. Basel won 13 of the 26 games, drawing ten, losing three times, they scored 48 goals conceding 28. Wenger played in 20 league matches and scored four league goals.

Wenger won his third championship with Basel at the end of their 1969–70 season. The team again finished one point clear of Lausanne Sports who ended the season in second position again. Basel won 15 of the 26 games, drawing seven, losing four times, they scored 59 and conceded 23 goals. During this season Wenger played 23 league matches and scored nine goals. He had his high during the month of April, on the 8th scoring a brace in the Swiss Cup semi-final as they beat Servette 4–1, on the 15th, 18th and 25th a brace in each of the three consequtive league matches, away against Bellinzona and at home against Winterthur and Lugano. Basel won all three of theses games 4–0. At the end of that season, on 16 June 1970, in the then very popular Cup of the Alps, an international club competition in which FCB played regularly, the team played against Lazio on a Tuesday evening in the Joggeli and it became a very turbulent game. The match was goalless for more than 70 minutes, then Lazio center forward Giorgio Chinaglia gave the visitors a 1–0 lead. But then there was this memorable appearance by Peter Wenger, who had come on as a substitute for Walter Balmer at half-time. Wenger turned the game around to 3–1 with a hat-trick between the 80th and 85th minutes, giving FCB the victory required to qualify for the final. In the final Wenger scored a brace as Basel beat Fiorentina 3–2 to lift the trophy.

Basel won 18 league games, drew 7 and only suffered one defeat in their 1971–72 season and they ended the season as Swiss Champions with 43 points, four points clear of second placed Zürich. The team scored 66 goals and conceded 28. Wenger, suffering long lasting injuries, played only 15 games without scoring a goal.

The 1972 Swiss League Cup was the inaugural Swiss League Cup competition. It was played in the summer of 1972 as a pre-season tournament to the 1972–73 Swiss football season. Benthaus coached the team to beat Servette 8–0, two goals from Wenger after being substituted in during the 63rd minute, Lausanne Sports 2–1 after extra time, Wenger played all 120 minutes, and Sion 6–1, Wenger scored the last goal, to reach the final. This was won by Basel who defeated FC Winterthur 4–1 in the final which took place on 11 November 1972 at the Letzigrund in Zürich. Ottmar Hitzfeld scored a hattrick in the final, but Wenger did not play. Again in their 1972–73 season Basel won the championship. The team won 17 games, drew five and were defeated four times. They scored 57 goals, conceding 30. Ottmar Hitzfeld was the team and the league top scorer with 18 goals, Wenger scored four in 19 outings. Basel won the championship four points clear of Grasshopper Club who finished in second position.

The following season was not very successful. In the 1973–74 season Basel finished the championship in fifth position, in the Swiss Cup they reached the quarter-finals. Wenger played only six league games, two in the European Cup and only one cup match and he scored just one goal. Wenger then moved on. Between the years 1966 and 1974 he played a total of 306 games for Basel scoring a total of 96 goals. 149 of these games were in the Nationalliga A, 27 in the cup (Swiss Cup and League Cup, 45 in the UEFA competitions (European Cup, UEFA Cup, Inter-Cities Fairs Cup and Cup of the Alps) and 85 were friendly games. He scored 40 goals in the domestic league, 11 in the cups, 12 in the European games and the other 33 were scored during the test games.

In the summer of 1974 Wenger transferred to Nordstern, who at that time played in the Nationalliga B, second tier of Swiss football. In the 1977–78 season they became division champions and won promotion. However, the following season Nordstern suffered relegation and at the end of the season Wenger retired from active football.

=== International ===
Wenger played seven games for the Swiss national team in the years 1969 and 1970. He made his international debut on 24 September 1969 in an international friendly at the Mithatpaşa Stadium as he was substituted in at half time. Switzerland lost 0−3 against Turkey. He played his last international game on 20 December 1970. Switzerland won 2−1 against Malta in the Empire Stadium in Gżira during the UEFA Euro 1972 qualifying stage.

== Private life ==
After his active career, which he spent a decade and a half in Basel, Wenger returned to central Switzerland. From then on he lived in his hometown of Küssnacht am Rigi for half a year and in Spain for the other half of the year. Wenger died in a clinic in Luzern on 23 July 2016 after a very short uncurable illness.

== Honours ==
Basel

- Swiss League champion: 1966-67, 1968-69, 1969-70, 1971-72 1972-73
- Swiss Cup winner: 1966-67
- Swiss League Cup winner: 1972
- Coppa delle Alpi winner: 1969, 1970
- Uhrencup winner: 1969, 1970

Nordstern

- Nationalliga B champions: 1977-78
