= José Gómez (footballer) =

Uruguayan footballer (born 1949)

Personal information
- Full name: José Gervasio Gómez Pereira
- Date of birth: 23 October 1949 (age 77)
- Place of birth: Uruguay

International career
Years	Team	Apps	(Gls)
- Uruguay

José Gervasio Gómez Pereira (born 23 October 1949) is a Uruguayan former professional footballer with Uruguayan club C.A. Cerro and was part of the Uruguayan Squad at the World Cup in Germany in 1974. He played as a forward.
