= Heinz Schönebeck =

German footballer

Personal information
- Date of birth: 11 March 1949 (age 77)
- Place of birth: Germany
- Position: Midfielder

Senior career*
Years	Team	Apps	(Gls)
1972–1975	FC Basel	3	(0)
1975–1976	Old Boys		
- * Club domestic league appearances and goals

Heinz Schönebeck (born 11 March 1949) is a German former professional footballer who played as midfielder in the 1970s.

Schönebeck joined FC Basel's first team for their 1972–73 season under manager Helmut Benthaus. After playing in two test games Schönebeck played his debut for the club in the Swiss League Cup match on 8 August 1972 as Basel won 2–1 after extra time against Lausanne-Sport. Schnönebeck was substituted in after 99 Minutes and replaced Karl Odermatt and it was Schönebeck who scored the winning goal just before the game ended. During his first season he played only five games for the first team, but he also played for the reserve team. Again in his second season he played only three test games and the match in the 1973–74 European Cup as Basel won 6–2 against Fram Reykjavík.

He played his domestic league debut for the club in the away on 7 September 1974 as Basel played a 1–1 draw with Sion. Between the years 1972 and 1974 Schönebeck played a total of 17 games for Basel scoring a total of two goals. Three of these games were in the Nationalliga A, two in the Swiss Cup, three in the Swiss League Cup, one in the European Cup, two in the Cup of the Alps and six were friendly games. He scored both his goals in the League Cup.

Following his time with Basel, Schönebeck moved on and joined local club Old Boys.

== Sources ==
- Die ersten 125 Jahre. Publisher: Josef Zindel im Friedrich Reinhardt Verlag, Basel. ISBN 978-3-7245-2305-5
- Verein "Basler Fussballarchiv" Homepage
