= Stefan Reisch =

German footballer

Personal information
- Date of birth: 29 November 1941 (age 84)
- Place of birth: Németkér, Hungary
- Position: Midfielder

Youth career
- TSV Herrieden
- TSV Moorenbrunn
- TSV Altenfurt
- 1955–1959: 1. FC Nürnberg

Senior career*
Years	Team	Apps	(Gls)
1960–1967	1. FC Nürnberg	167	(17)
1967–1968	Neuchâtel Xamax		
1968–1970	Club Brugge		
1970–1972	FC Basel	21	(2)
1972–1973	Kickers Würzburg		

International career
1961–1962	West Germany youth team		
1962–1964	West Germany	9	(0)

Managerial career
- 1972–1973: Kickers Würzburg
- ASV Neumarkt
- Jahn Regensburg
- SpVgg Büchenbach
- SpVgg Ansbach
- FC Amberg
- * Club domestic league appearances and goals

Stefan Reisch (born 29 November 1941) is a German former footballer who played as a midfielder during the 1960s and 1970s.

== Early life ==
Reisch was born in Németkér, Hungary. As most of the Danube Swabians did after World War II, the Reisch family left their native Hungary. They had lived in a small village called Németkér, which means something like "German village". They were taken up in the town of Herrieden in the district of Ansbach. Reisch started his youth football in the local club TSV Herrieden. He later played for TSV Moorenbrunn and TSV Altenfurt before moving to the youth team of 1. FC Nürnberg.

== Club career ==
Reisch began playing professionally in 1960 for the 1. FC Nürnberg. He played for the club for seven years and made over 150 appearances before joining Switzerland's Neuchâtel Xamax in 1967. In 1968, he signed for Belgian side Club Brugge where he played for two years before returning to Switzerland with Helmut Benthaus' successful FC Basel team. Soon after joining the club, he scored a goal in the 1970 Uhrencup Final, which Basel won 8–7 after penalties after a 5–5 at full time. He ended his professional career after the 1971–72 Nationalliga A season as Basel won the Swiss League Championship. In Basel he made a total of 40 appearances, scoring a total of six goals, 21 matches (two goals) in the league and cup, 13 in the European Cup and Coppa delle Alpi (one goal), the rest in test matches.

Summer 1972 saw him take up a player-manager's role at Kickers Würzburg, but he lasted just one season in charge. He was later player manager for ASV Neumarkt, Jahn Regensburg and for SpVgg Büchenbach and manager for various amateur teams such as SpVgg Ansbach und FC Amberg.

== International career ==
Reisch was capped nine time for the West Germany national team between 1962 and 1964. He made his debut on 30 September 1962, in a 3–2 win over Yugoslavia in Zagreb and played his last game in a 2–2 draw with Scotland in Hanover, on 12 May 1964.

== Honours ==
1. FC Nürnberg

- German football championship: 1961
- DFB-Pokal: 1961–62

Club Brugge

- Belgian Cup: 1970

FC Basel

- Swiss League: 1971–72
- Coppa delle Alpi: 1970
- Uhrencup: 1970
