= Rolf Riner =

Swiss footballer (1951–1988)

Personal information
- Full name: Rolf Riner
- Date of birth: 24 April 1951
- Place of birth: Switzerland
- Date of death: 11 April 1988 (aged 36)
- Positions: Midfielder; striker

Youth career
- until 1969: FC Basel

Senior career*
Years	Team	Apps	(Gls)
1969–1973	FC Basel	19	(1)
1973–1976	Servette	68	(11)
1976–1984	Chênois	215	(21)
- * Club domestic league appearances and goals

Rolf Riner (24 April 1951 – 11 April 1988) was a Swiss footballer who played for FC Basel, Servette and CS Chênois during the 1970s and early 1950s. He played mainly in the position of striker, but also as a midfielder.

== Football career ==
Riner played his youth football for FC Basel and advanced to their first team during the 1969/70 season. During his first season he played only one match and this was the Cup of the Alps game against Sampdoria. The match was played on 9 June 1970 in the St. Jakob Stadium and Riner scored the winning goal as Basel won 2–1.

After a few further test games, Riner played his domestic league debut for the club in their 1970–71 season. It was the home game on 12 September 1970 as Basel won 3–0 against Fribourg. He scored his first league goal for his club on 22 May 1971 in the home game against Winterthur. It was the fourth goal of the game as Basel won 5–0. Basel finished the regular season level on points with Grasshopper Club Zürich and so they contested a play-off game on 8 June 1971 to decide the title winners. Grasshopper won the play-off 4–3 after extra time.

In the 1971–72 Nationalliga A Basel won the championship four points ahead of Zürich and five ahead of the Grasshoppers. Riner played in the final of the Swiss Cup, which was held on 22 May 1970 in the Wankdorf Stadium in Bern. But Basel were defeated 0–1 by Zürich through a goal by Daniel Jeandupeux.

The following season Basel again won the 1972–73 Nationalliga A championship, this time four points ahead of Grasshopper Club. In the Swiss Cup home game on 5 November 1972 Riner scored a Hat-trick as Basel won 6–0 against Martigny-Sports. The cup-final was played on 23 April 1973 and again against Zürich. The game ended goalless after 90 minutes. Riner was substituted in for the extra time. But Peter Marti (92) and Fritz Künzli (101) scored the goals to give Zürich the title for the second consecutive time in a final against Basel.

Between the years 1969 and 1973 Riner played a total of 53 games for Basel scoring a total of 15 goals. 19 of these games were in the Nationalliga A, six in the Swiss Cup two in the Swiss League Cup, five in the Cup of the Alps and 21 were friendly games. He scored one goal in the domestic league, four in the Cup, one in the League Cup, one in the Cup of the Alps and eight others were scored during the test games.

During the previous season Riner did not get as much playing time as he had expected, so to obtain more playing experience, he moved on to Servette before the 1973–74 Nationalliga A season. In the 1975–76 Nationalliga A season Servette were league runners-up. Also in the same season Servette reached the Swiss Cup final. But here they were defeated 0–1 by Zürich.

After three years Riner moved on to play for Chênois in the summer of 1976. With Chênois he played for five seasons in the top tier of Swiss football. But at the end of the 1980–81 Nationalliga A season the club was relegated. Riner stayed with the club and played his last three active football seasons in the Nationalliga B.

== Honours ==
Basel

- Swiss League champions: 1971–72, 1972–73
- Swiss League runner-up: 1970–71
- Swiss Cup runner-up: 1971–72, 1972–73
- Swiss League Cup winner: 1972

Servette

- Swiss League runner-up: 1975–76
- Swiss Cup runner-up: 1975–76

== Sources ==
- Rotblau: Jahrbuch Saison 2017/2018. Publisher: FC Basel Marketing AG. ISBN 978-3-7245-2189-1
- Die ersten 125 Jahre. Publisher: Josef Zindel im Friedrich Reinhardt Verlag, Basel. ISBN 978-3-7245-2305-5
- Verein "Basler Fussballarchiv" Homepage
- Rec.Sport.Soccer Statistics Foundation Switzerland
