= Rudolf Wampfler =

Swiss footballer (born 1949)

Personal information
- Full name: Rudolf Wampfler
- Date of birth: 5 October 1949 (age 77)
- Place of birth: Raron, Switzerland
- Position: Midfielder

Youth career
- until 1969: FC Raron

Senior career*
Years	Team	Apps	(Gls)
1969–1970	FC Raron		
1970–1973	FC Sion	77	(7)
1973–1974	FC Basel	18	(2)
1974–1975	FC Fribourg	24	(0)
1975–1977	CS Chênois	29	(3)
- * Club domestic league appearances and goals

Rudolf Wampfler (born 5 October 1949) is a Swiss former footballer who played in the 1970s as midfielder.

Born in Raron, near Sion, Wampfler played his youth football by local club FC Raron and advanced to their first team. He then moved on to play for FC Sion in 1970.

Wampfler joined Basel's first team for their 1973–74 season under team manager Helmut Benthaus. After playing in four test games and one Swiss League Cup match, Wampfler played his domestic league debut for his new club in the away game on 18 August 1973 as Basel won 1–0 against Chênois. He scored his first goal for his club on 20 September in first round of the 1973–74 European Cup in the away game at the Kleinholz Stadion in Olten as Basel won 6–2 against Icelandic sports club Fram Reykjavík. In the next round during the for Basel legendary game against Belgien team Club Brugge, Wampfler scored twice as Basel won 6–4 (7–6 on aggregate). Wampfler scored his first domestic league goal for Basel on 11 November in the away game as the team won 3–2 against Servette.

In his one season with the club Wampfler played a total of forty-four games for Basel scoring a total of six goals. Eighteen of these games were in the Nationalliga A, five in the Swiss Cup and Swiss League Cup, five in the European Cup and fifteen were friendly games. He scored two goals in the domestic league, three in the European Cup and the other was scored during the test games.

After his season with Basel, Wampfler moved on to play one season for FC Fribourg, who at that time played on the Nationalliga B, second team of Swiss football. Then he moved on again to play for CS Chênois.

== Sources ==
- Die ersten 125 Jahre. Publisher: Josef Zindel im Friedrich Reinhardt Verlag, Basel. ISBN 978-3-7245-2305-5
- Verein "Basler Fussballarchiv" Homepage
