= Peter Ramseier =

Swiss footballer (1944–2018)

Personal information
- Full name: Peter Ramseier
- Date of birth: 29 November 1944
- Place of birth: Bern, Switzerland
- Date of death: 10 October 2018 (aged 73)
- Place of death: Muttenz, Switzerland
- Position: Defender

Youth career
- FC Zähringia

Senior career*
Years	Team	Apps	(Gls)
–1964	FC Zähringia		
1964–1966	Cantonal Neuchâtel	43	(5)
1966–1978	Basel	253	(25)

International career
- Switzerland youth
1968–1973	Switzerland	28	(0)
- * Club domestic league appearances and goals

Peter Ramseier (29 November 1944 – 10 October 2018) was a Swiss international football player who played as a defender during the 1960s and 1970s.

== Career ==
Born in Bern, Ramseier played his youth football with FC Zähringia (now named Breitenrain). At the age of 16, he was already playing in the junior national team, with whom he played in the UEFA tournament in England a year later. Aged 20 years he was persuaded to join Cantonal Neuchâtel, so he moved to Neuchâtel to learn the French language. Cantonal played in the Nationalliga B, the second tier of Swiss football, and Ramseier immediately became regular player for them. After two years in French-speaking Switzerland, the defender moved on.

In July 1966, Ramseier joined FC Basel's first team for their 1966–67 season under head coach Helmut Benthaus. After playing in seven test games, Ramseier played his team debut in the away game in the Swiss Cup quarter-final on 8 March 1967 as Basel won 2–1 against Biel-Bienne. He played his domestic league debut for the team just four days later, on 12 March in the home game in the St. Jakob Stadium as Basel won 1–0 against La Chaux-de-Fonds. Ramseier won the Swiss championship title for the first time that season. Basel finished the championship one point clear of FC Zürich who finished in second position. Basel won 16 of the 26 games, drawing eight, losing twice, and they scored 60 goals conceding just 20. In that season he won the double with Basel. In the Cup final on 15 May 1967 Basel's opponents were Lausanne-Sports. In the former Wankdorf Stadium, Helmut Hauser scored the decisive goal via penalty. The game went down in football history due to the sit-down strike that followed this goal. After 88 minutes of play, with the score at 1–1, referee Karl Göppel awarded Basel a controversial penalty. André Grobéty had pushed Hauser gently in the back and Hauser let himself drop theatrically. Subsequently, after the 2–1 lead for Basel the Lausanne players refused to resume the game and they sat down demonstratively on the pitch. The referee had to abandon the match. Basel were awarded the cup with a 3–0 forfait.

Ramseier scored his first goal for the team in the Swiss Cup in the home game on 15 December 1968 as Basel won 3–1 against Luzern. He won his second championship title in Basel's 1968–69 season. They finished the season just one point clear of second placed Lausanne-Sports. Basel won 13 of the 26 games, drawing ten, losing three times, they scored 48 goals conceding 28.

Only on one occasion in his entire career did Ramseier score more than one goal in a match. He scored two goals on 13 September 1969 in the Cup match as Basel won 10–0 against amateur club FC Minerva Bern. Ramseier went to score another cup goal in the home victory against Xamax in the quarter-finals and his fourth cup goal that season in the home game in the semi-finals against Servette. They advanced to the final, but here were defeated by Zürich after extra time. But, Ramseier won the championship with Basel for the third time in this 1969–70 season. The team again finished one point clear of Lausanne-Sports who again ended in second position. Basel won 15 of the 26 games, drawing seven, losing four times, they scored 59 goals conceding 23. Ramseier scored his very first league goal for the team in this season. This was on 14 December 1969 in the home game as Basel went on to win 6–2 against Wettingen.

In an interview given in February 2014, Ramseier recalled the tie which he believed was one of the most relevant in his career. This was the first match that Basel had ever won in a European competition. In the first round of the 1970–71 European Cup Basel were drawn against Spartak Moscow. The first leg, which was played on 16 September 1970 away from home, was lost 3–2 with Odermatt and Benthaus scoring for the guests during the last 12 minutes, after they had gone three down with just a quarter of an hour left to play. In the second leg played in the St. Jakob Stadium Basel won 2–1, the goals being scored by Urs Siegenthaler und Walter Balmer. Thus the tie ended 4–4 on aggregate. Basel won on the away goals rules and advanced to the second round.

In 1971–72 Ramseier won the championship for the fourth time. Basel ended the season four points ahead of Zürich. Of the 26 league games Basel won 18, drawing seven, losing just once, scoring 66 goals conceding 28. He won the Swiss championship title for the fifth time in the 1972–73 Nationalliga A season. Basel won the championship four points ahead of Grasshopper Club. Basel won 17 of their 26 league games, drew five and lost four. They scored a total of 57 goals conceding 30. The 1972 Swiss League Cup was the inaugural Swiss League Cup competition. It was played in the summer of 1972 as a pre-season tournament to the 1972–73 Swiss football season. Basel beat Servette 8–0, Lausanne Sports 2–1 aet and Sion 6–1 to reach the final. This was won by Basel who defeated FC Winterthur 4–1 in the final which took place on 11 November 1972 at the Letzigrund in Zürich. Ottmar Hitzfeld scored a hattrick in the final.

For Ramseier and his team the 1976–77 was again a very successful season. The league format had been changed. Instead of 14 teams playing a single round robin, it now was reduced to 12 teams with a Qualifying phase and a championship round with the six top teams. This meant no longer 26 games, but now 22 plus 10. In the Qualifying phase Basel obtained 33 points and were two points behind Servette. They managed to close the gap in the championship round, but because both teams were level on points at the end, the championship was decided in a play-off match. This match was held on 26 June 1977. Basels goals were scored by Mundschin and von Wartburg as they won 2–1 and became Swiss champions.

In addition to the six championship titles that he won, there were five cup finals in which Ramseier played. In his first cup final participation, mentioned above, the forfait win against Lausanne-Sports and in his last in 1975, as Basel beat Winterthur 2–1 after extra time, he was part of the winning team. However, in between there were the three cup final defeats against FCZ. All three within four years.

Between the years 1966 and 1978 Ramseier played a total of 483 games for Basel scoring a total of 49 goals. 253 of these games were in the Swiss Super League, 40 in the Swiss Cup, 15 in the Swiss League Cup, 64 in the UEFA competitions (European Cup, UEFA Cup, Inter-Cities Fairs Cup and Cup of the Alps) and 111 were friendly games. He scored 25 goals in the domestic league, eight in the domestic cups, two in the European games and the other 14 were scored during the test games.

== Personal life ==
With his parents and two brothers Ramseier grew up in close proximity to the Wankdorf Stadium in Bern. Before and after the games, when thousands of spectators made a pilgrimage past their apartment to the Wankdorf, the three brothers placed a pillow on the window sill and watched the lively goings-on from above.

Fellow Basel player Mucho Frigerio brought Ramseier to Bank Dreyfuss in 1967. Right up until his retirement Ramseier remained loyal to his employer. As human resources manager, he played a key role in creating a pleasant working atmosphere. Ramseier married Annemarie Bigler and the couple had a son named Adrian. From 1978, the family lived in a small family house in Muttenz. Peter Ramseier was always in the stadium and watched the games live.

On the morning of 10 October 2018, Peter Ramseier was still feeling well and was active on his home trainer. During the course of the day he complained of feeling unwell and this led to his suden death shortly afterwards, without any other previous symptoms.

== Honours ==
- Swiss League: 1966-67, 1968-69, 1969-70, 1971-72, 1972-73, 1976-77
- Swiss Cup: 1966–67, 1974–75
- Swiss Cup runner-up: 1969–70, 1971–72, 1972–73
- Swiss League Cup winner: 1972
- Coppa delle Alpi winner: 1969, 1970
- Uhren Cup winner: 1969, 1970

== Sources ==
- Josef Zindel (2018). FC Basel 1893. Die ersten 125 Jahre (in German). Basel: Friedrich Reinhardt Verlag. ISBN 978-3-7245-2305-5.
- Verein "Basler Fussballarchiv" Homepage
- Rotblau: Jahrbuch Saison 2015/2016. Publisher: FC Basel Marketing AG. ISBN 978-3-7245-2050-4
- Josef Zindel, FC Basel:Emotionen in Rotblau, Opinio Verlag, Basel, 2001, ISBN 3-03999-002-0
