= 1975–76 FC Basel season =

FC Basel
1975–76 season
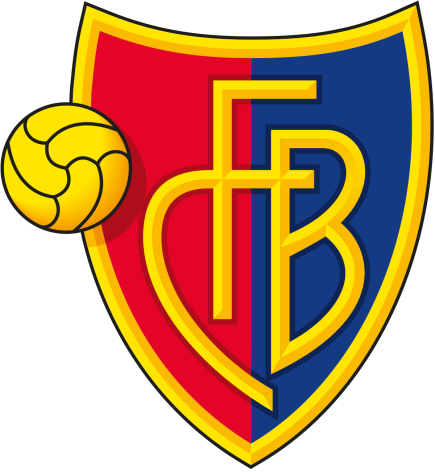
- Chairman: Félix Musfeld
- Manager: Helmut Benthaus
- Ground: St. Jakob Stadium, Basel
- Nationalliga A: 3rd of 14
- Swiss Cup: Round of 16
- Swiss League Cup: Semi-final
- UEFA Cup Winners' Cup: First round
- Coppa delle Alpi: Runners-up
- Top goalscorer: League: Roland Schönenberger (10); All: Serge Muhmenthaler (15)
- Highest home attendance: 28,000 on 4 October 1975 vs Zürich
- Lowest home attendance: 4,500 on 4 May 1976 vs St. Gallen
- Average home league attendance: 10,307

The Fussball Club Basel 1893 1975–76 season was their 82nd season since the club was founded. It was their 30th consecutive season in the top flight of Swiss football after they won promotion during the 1945–46 Nationalliga A season. They played their home games in the St. Jakob Stadium. Félix Musfeld was club chairman for the sixth consecutive period.

== Overview ==
=== Pre-season ===
Helmut Benthaus was first team manager for the eleventh consecutive season. There were a number of changes in the team during the pre-season. Goalkeeper Marcel Kunz would have liked to have stayed for another season, but his contract was not prolonged, so he moved on to Nordstern Basel one tier lower for one season before he retired from active football. Kunz had been with the club for 12 seasons. Between the years 1963 and 1975 he had played a total of 373 games for Basel, exactly 200 of these games were in the domestic league. He had won the championship five times, the Swiss Cup twice and the Swiss League Cup once. Karl Odermatt would have stayed with the club, but the board of directors refused to pay the desired wages, so he moved to Young Boys. Odermatt had been with the club for 13 seasons. In that time he played a total of 534 games for Basel, 296 of these in the domestic league scoring 92 league goals. He had also won the championship five times, the Swiss League Cup once, but the Swiss Cup three times. After four seasons with the club Ottmar Hitzfeld moved on to VfB Stuttgart, for him this was a large step forward in his career. Hitzfeld had played 177 games, of these 92 in the league with 66 league goals. Walter Balmer retired from active football, he had been with Basel seven seasons, had played 306 games, 156 in the league scoring 65 goals. Roland Paolucci was also reaching the end of his career, but he decided to add another season with Nordstern Basel. Between the years 1965 and 1975 Paolucci played a total of 133 games for Basel's first team and 65 of these games were in the Nationalliga A (four goals). During this time Paolucci also played for Basel's reserve team.

In the other direction Swiss international Peter Marti signed in from Swiss champions Zürich, Serge Muhmenthaler signed in from Young Boys and Walter Geisser joined from local club Nordstern Basel who played one tier lower. As seen in the previous years Benthaus relied on young players who came up from the reserve team to help, when needed in the first team.

Basel played a total of 56 games in their 1975–76 season. 26 in the domestic league, seven in the Swiss Cup, two in the Swiss League Cup, four in the Cup of the Alps, five in the Cup of the Alps, two in the 1975–76 European Cup Winners' Cup and 17 were friendly matches. The team scored a total of 129 goals and conceded 96. Basel won six friendly games, drew six and lost five.

=== Domestic league ===
The Swiss Football Association was reforming the Swiss football league system this year, reducing the number of teams in the Nationalliga A from 14 to 12 and increasing the Nationalliga B teams from 14 to 16. Therefore, three teams were being relegated and only one promoted. These 14 teams were the top 12 teams from the previous 1974–75 season and the two newly promoted teams Biel-Bienne and La Chaux-de-Fonds. The champions would qualify for the 1975–76 European Cup. Basel played a good season. But reigning champions Zürich ran away with the title, they won the championship with 44 points, five points clear of second placed Servette and ten points clear of third placed Basel. The second and third placed teams were to have qualified for UEFA Cup, but because Zürich won the double the cup runners-up Servette advanced to the 1976–77 Cup Winners' Cup and the third and forth placed teams advanced to the 1975–76 UEFA Cup. Lugano and the two newly promoted teams, Biel-Bienne and La Chaux-de-Fonds, suffered relegation.

=== Swiss Cup and League Cup ===
Basel started in the Swiss Cup tournament in the round of 32 on 25 September 1975 away against lower tier Grenchen and won this game 2–0 to qualify for the round of 16. Here they were drawn away against Young Boys and here the competition came to an end because they were defeated 1–3.

In the Swiss League Cup Basel started in the round of 32 on 9 August away against St. Gallen and won 4–1. In the round of 16 Basel played away against second tier Young Fellows Zürich and won this easily 8–1. Lower tier Grenchen were drawn as hosts for the quarter-finals and Basel won this easily as well 6–2. Basel were drawn as hosts in the semi-final against Young Boys. There was no revenge for the defeat in the Swiss Cup earlier this season because YB won this clash as well, in overtime 3–5.

=== European Cup and Coppa delle Alpi ===
As Swiss Cup winners in the previous season, Basel were qualified for the European Cup Winners' Cup. In the first round of the 1975–76 European Cup Winners' Cup Basel were drawn against Spanisch Cup 1974–75 runners-up Atlético Madrid. Atlético had been beaten in the final by Real Madrid 3–4 after a penalty shoot out, but because Real became Spanish champions they thus entered the 1975–76 European Cup and Atlético competed in this competition as runners-up. The 1st leg was played in St. Jakob Stadium in front of 33,000 spectators and Basel took an early lead through Roland Schönenberger in the third minute. But a double strike from José Eulogio Gárate and Rubén Ayala in the 65th and 68th minute turned the game and Basel were defeated 2–3. In the return leg in Vicente Calderón Stadium, with over 25,000 spectators, Heraldo Bezerra put Atlético in the lead in the 74th minute, Otto Demarmels leveled the score, but this was not enough to stop Atlético advancing to the next round.

In the Coppa delle Alpi (Cup of the Alps) Basel were in a group with Stade de Reims, Olympique Lyonnais and Lausanne-Sport. Two wins and two draws were enough for Basel to qualify for the final. But here they faced Servette in the Charmilles Stadium and lost 0–3.

== Players ==
Note: Flags indicate national team as defined under FIFA eligibility rules; some limited exceptions apply. Players may hold more than one non-FIFA nationality.

No.	Pos.	Nation	Player
1	GK	SUI	Jürg Wenger
2	DF	SUI	Alex Wirth
3	DF	SUI	Walter Mundschin
4	MF	SUI	Peter Ramseier
5	DF	SUI	Paul Fischli
6	MF	SUI	Otto Demarmels
7	MF	SUI	Peter Marti (from Zürich)
9	MF	SUI	Serge Muhmenthaler (from Young Boys)
10	DF	SUI	René Hasler
11	MF	SUI	Walter Geisser (from Nordstern Basel)
12	MF	SUI	Bruno Rahmen
13	FW	SUI	Markus Tanner

No.	Pos.	Nation	Player
14	DF	SUI	Jörg Stohler
15	FW	GER	Paul Dörflinger (from FC Rheinfelden)
16	MF	SUI	Michel Amacker (from FC Raron)
17	MF	SUI	Arthur von Wartburg
18	FW	SUI	Roland Schönenberger
19	MF	DEN	Eigil Nielsen
22	GK	SUI	Hans Müller
—		SUI	Rolf Bucher (reserves)
—		SUI	Daniel Hagenbuch (reserves)
—		SUI	Markus Walter Just (reserves)
—		SUI	? Wolfsberger (reserves)
—	MF	SUI	Erni Maissen (reserves)

Players who left the squad

Note: Flags indicate national team as defined under FIFA eligibility rules; some limited exceptions apply. Players may hold more than one non-FIFA nationality.

No.	Pos.	Nation	Player
—	GK	SUI	Marcel Kunz (to Nordstern Basel)
—	MF	GER	Martin Hägele (reserves)
—	MF	SUI	Karl Odermatt (to Young Boys)
—	MF	SUI	Roland Paolucci (to Nordstern Basel)

No.	Pos.	Nation	Player
—	MF	SUI	Heinz Schönebeck (to Old Boys)
—	FW	GER	Ottmar Hitzfeld (to VfB Stuttgart)
—	FW	SUI	Walter Balmer (retired)
—	FW	SUI	Fritz Wirth (to Grenchen)

== Results ==
Legend

Win Draw Loss Postponed

=== Friendly matches ===
==== Pre-season and mid-season ====
10 July 1975 Pre-season	SR Delémont (Switzerland)	1–4	(Switzerland) Basel	Parc des Sports, Delémont
	Greppin 50' (1:3)	Summary	18' (0:1) Tanner; 36' (0:1) Schönenberger; 40' (0:3) Schönenberger; 65' (1:4) Demarmels	Attendance: 500; Referee: (Switzerland) Bloesch Biel/Bienne

16 July 1975 Pre-season	Freiburger FC (West Germany)	1–5	(Switzerland) Basel	Freiburg
	Goal	Summary	(1x) Tanner (1x) Marti (1x) Demarmels (1x) Schönenberger (o.g.)

2 September 1975 Mid-season	FV Lörrach (West Germany)	0–3	(Switzerland) Basel	Lörrach
		Summary	37' (0:1) Dörflinger; 42' (0:2) Wirth; 57' (0:3) Dörflinger	Attendance: 2,000; Referee: (West Germany) Bruno Sahner

10 September 1975 Mid-season	Italy national team	6–0	(Switzerland) Basel	Stadio Comunale Artemio Franchi, Florence
16:00	Graziani 30' (1:0); Savoldi 34' (2:0); Benetti 58' (3:0); Antognoni 74' (4:0); Antognoni 76' (5:0); Pulici 77' (6:0)	Summary		Attendance: 15,000; Referee: (Italy) Gino Menicucci

15 November 1975 Mid-season	Luzern (Switzerland)	1–1	(Switzerland) Basel	Stadion Allmend, Luzern
	Küttel (1x)	[ Summary]	(1x) Schönenberger	Attendance: 860; Referee: (Switzerland) Willi Dreier Zürich

==== Winter break to end of season ====
7 December 1975 Winter break	Nordstern Basel (Switzerland)	1–3	(Switzerland) Basel	Stadion Rankhof, Basel
14:30	Zoppelletto 43' (1:1)	Summary	34' (0:1) Fischli; 50' (1:2) Just; 86' (1:3) Muhmenthaler	Attendance: 2,100; Referee: (Switzerland) Josef Schnidrig

14 December 1975 Winter break	Basel (Switzerland)	2–2	(West Germany) Borussia Mönchengladbach	St. Jakob Stadium, Basel
14:30	Muhmenthaler 78' (1:1); Muhmenthaler 80' (2:1)	Summary	8' (pen. 0:1) Simonsen; 85' (2:2) Simonsen	Attendance: 14,000; Referee: (Switzerland) Bruno Galler Baden

January 1976 Training camp	Martinique XI	1–2	(Switzerland) Basel	Martinique
	Goal	Summary	Goal

January 1976 Training camp	Guadeloupe XI	1–1	(Switzerland) Basel	Guadeloupe
	Goal	Summary	Goal

January 1976 Training camp	ASG Juventus de Sainte-Anne (Guadeloupe)	3–3	(Switzerland) Basel	Guadeloupe
	Philippe Alexandre 1' (1:0); Tibere 52' (2:2); Maya (3:3)	Summary	5' (1:1) Muhmenthaler; 7' (1:2) Muhmenthaler; 56' (2:3) Marti

8 February 1986 Winter break	Grenchen (Switzerland)	1–1	(Switzerland) Basel	Stadion Brühl, Grenchen
	Waeber 62' (1:1)	Summary	21' (0:1) Tanner	Attendance: 400; Referee: (Switzerland) Werner Bösch

15 February 1986 Winter break	Basel (Switzerland)	1–1	(Switzerland) Grasshopper Club	St. Jakob Stadium, Basel
14:30	Muhmenthaler 20' (1:1)	Summary	3' (0:1) Santrac	Attendance: 512; Referee: (Switzerland) Kurt Fuchs Basel

20 March 1986 Mid-season	Sion (Switzerland)	2–0	(Switzerland) Basel	Stade Tourbillon, Sion
	Parini 7' (1:0); Coutaz 19' (2:0)	Summary		Attendance: 750; Referee: (Switzerland) Jean-Daniel Pralong

15 April 1986 Mid-season	Luzern (Switzerland)	2–3	(Switzerland) Basel	Stadion Allmend, Luzern
	Mentasti 6' (1:0); L. Kaufmann 34' (2:1)	Summary	18' (1:1) Tanner; 54' (2:2) Nielsen; 75' (2:3) Nielsen	Attendance: 400; Referee: (Switzerland) Alfred Heinis

21 April 1986 Mid-season	Basel (Switzerland)	0–2	(Germany) Schalke	St. Jakob Stadium, Basel
20:00		Summary	23' (0:2) E. Kremers; 28' (0:2) Rüssmann	Attendance: 6,500; Referee: (Switzerland) Ernest Guignet (Yverdon)

21 May 1976 Mid-season	Basel (Switzerland)	3–4	(Germany) Hamburger SV	St. Jakob Stadium, Basel
20:00	Demarmels 24' (1:0); Demarmels 55' (2:2); Rahmen 59' (3:3)	Summary	30' (1:1) Eigl; 36' (1:2) Zaczyk; 59' (2:3) Ettmayer; 90' (3:4) Reimann	Attendance: 3,000; Referee: (Switzerland) Gérard Racine (Biel/Bienne)

16 June 1976 End of season	Basel (Switzerland)	2–3	(Italy) Perugia	St. Jakob Stadium, Basel
20:00	Schönenberger 20' (1:0); Rahmen 30' (2:1)	Summary	24' (1:1) Ciccotelli; 35' (2:2) Frosio; 50' (2:3) Ciccotelli	Attendance: 1,700; Referee: (Switzerland) Peter Scherz

=== Nationalliga ===
==== League matches ====
16 August 1975 Round 1	Basel	5–1	Grasshopper Club	St. Jakob Stadium, Basel
20:00	Muhmenthaler 23' (1:0); Nielsen 38' (2:1); Muhmenthaler 54' (3:1); Marti 65' (4:1); Muhmenthaler 76' (5:1)	Summary	35' (1:1) Barberis	Attendance: 16,000; Referee: (Switzerland) Jean Dubach (Nidau)

23 August 1975 Round 2	Winterthur	2–3	Basel	Schützenwiese, Winterthur
20:15	Conway 8' (1:0); Meili (yellow card) 38'; Bollmann (yellow card) 45'; Meili 81' (2:3)	Summary	29' (1:1) Muhmenthaler; (yellow card) 38' Marti; 41' (1:2) Marti; 49' (pen. 1:3) Hasler	Attendance: 3,200; Referee: (Switzerland) Peter Scherz

30 August 1975 Round 3	Basel	1–2	Lausanne-Sport	St. Jakob Stadium, Basel
20:00	Schönenberger 90+1' (1:2)	Summary	52' (0:1) Zappella; 87' (0:2) Duvillard	Attendance: 17,000; Referee: (Switzerland) Rudolf Renggli (Luzern)

6 September 1975 Round 4	Biel-Bienne	1–5	Basel	Gurzelen Stadion, Biel/Bienne
20:15	Elsig (yellow card) 2'; Heutschi 75' (pen. 1:5)	Summary	8' (0:1) Nielsen; 10' (0:2) Muhmenthaler; (yellow card) 28' Marti; 38' (0:3) Schönenberger; (yellow card) 48' Schönenberger; 60' (0:4) Ramseier; 68' (0:2) Schönenberger	Attendance: 6,000; Referee: (Switzerland) Gérard Racine (Biel/Bienne)

13 September 1975 Round 5	Basel	3–0	Lugano	St. Jakob Stadium, Basel
20:00	Muhmenthaler 3' (1:0); Marti 49' (2:0); Schönenberger 64' (3:0)	Summary		Attendance: 10,000; Referee: (Switzerland) Gérard Racine (Biel/Bienne)

20 September 1975 Round 6	Xamax	2–2	Basel	Stade de la Maladière (1924), Neuchâtel
17:45	Zaugg (yellow card) 55'; Müller 56' (pen. 1:2); Müller 81' (2:2)	Summary	5' (0:1) Mundschin; 33' (0:2) Muhmenthaler; (yellow card) 65' Muhmenthaler	Attendance: 8,700; Referee: (Switzerland) Otto Wyniger (Wetzikon)

4 October 1975 Round 7	Basel	1–1	Zürich	St. Jakob Stadium, Basel
20:00	Rahmen 89' (1:1)	FCB summary FCZ summary	11' (0:1) Kuhn; (yellow card) 43' Zigerlig; (yellow card) 50' Heer	Attendance: 28,000; Referee: (Switzerland) René Matthieu (Sierre)

15 October 1975 Round 8	St. Gallen	2–2	Basel	Espenmoos, St. Gallen
20:15	Schneeberger 53' (1:1); Schneeberger (yellow card) 64'; Blättler 70' (2:2)	Summary	26' (0:1) Muhmenthaler; (yellow card) 27' Nielsen; 57' (1:2) Nielsen; (yellow card) 66' Fischli; (yellow card) 69' Mundschin	Attendance: 10,500; Referee: (Switzerland) Gottlieb Barmettler Luzern

18 October 1975 Round 9	Basel	1–1	Sion	St. Jakob Stadium, Basel
20:00	Tanner 26' (1:1)	Summary	69' Coutaz; (yellow card) 74' Dayen	Attendance: 5,000; Referee: (Switzerland) Gérard Racine (Biel/Bienne )

25 October 1975 Round 10	Young Boys	3–1	Basel	Wankdorf Stadium, Bern
17:30	Trümpler (yellow card) 56'; Rebmann 66' (1:0); Siegenthaler 68' (2:1); Bruttin 73' (3:1)	Summary	(yellow card) 23' von Wartburg; (yellow card) 49' Nielsen; 55' (0:1) Nielsen	Attendance: 18,500; Referee: (Switzerland) Otto Isler (Zürich)

1 November 1975 Round 11	Basel	3–0	Chênois	St. Jakob Stadium, Basel
20;00	Schönenberger 36' (1:0); Ramseier 70' (2:0); Rahmen 86' (3:0)	Summary		Attendance: 5,000; Referee: (Switzerland) Willy Utz (Oensingen)

8 November 1975 Round 12	Basel	2–0	Servette	St. Jakob Stadium, Basel
20:00	Stohler 21' (1:0); Müller (yellow card) 58'; Schönenberger 73' (2:0); Schönenberger (yellow card) 90+1'	Summary	(yellow card) 36' Marchi	Attendance: 12,000; Referee: (Switzerland) Attilio Bignasca Lugano

23 November 1975 Round 13	La Chaux-de-Fonds	1–2	Basel	Stade Charrière, La Chaux-de-Fonds
14:30	Brossard 87' (1:2)	Summary	53' (0:1) Schönenberger; 77' (0:2) Marti	Attendance: 1,300; Referee: (Switzerland) André Daina

30 November 1975 Round 14	Grasshopper Club	4–1	Basel	Hardturm, Zürich
15:00	Bosco 48' (1:0); Bosco 72' (2:0); Elsener 83' (3:0); Santrač 85' (4:1)	Summary	84' (3:1) Mundschin	Attendance: 7,900; Referee: (Switzerland) Gérard Racine (Biel/Bienne)

7 March 1976 Round 15	Basel	5–1	Winterthur	St. Jakob Stadium, Basel
14:30	Stohler 37' (1:0); Mundschin 59' (2:1); Marti 70' (3:1); Stohler 78' (4:1); Schönenberger 84' (5:1)	Summary	46' (1:1) Wehrli	Attendance: 5,000; Referee: (Switzerland) Peter Kellenberger

14 March 1976 Round 16	Lausanne-Sport	0–1	Basel	Olympique de la Pontaise, Lausanne
14:30		Summary	72' (0:1) Rahmen	Attendance: 4,600; Referee: (Switzerland) Peter Scherz

27 March 1976 Round 17	Basel	3–1	Biel-Bienne	St. Jakob Stadium, Basel
20:00	Stohler 40' (1:0); Demarmels 41' (2:0); Marti 71' (3:0)	Summary	79' (3:1) Elsig	Attendance: 6,000; Referee: (Switzerland) Ernest Guignet Yverdon

3 April 1976 Round 18	Lugano	1–1	Basel	Cornaredo, Lugano
20:45	Lalie 64' (1:1); Brenna (yellow card) 85'	Summary	30' (0:1) Marti; (yellow card) 89' Marti	Attendance: 3,500; Referee: (Switzerland) Gérard Racine (Biel/Bienne)

10 April 1976 Round 19	Basel	0–0	Xamax	St. Jakob Stadium, Basel
20:00		Summary		Attendance: 7,500; Referee: (Switzerland) Werner Bösch

24 April 1976 Round 20	Zürich	1–1	Basel	Letzigrund, Zürich
17:00	Katić 55' (1:0)	FCZ summary FCB summary	73' (1:1) Hasler	Attendance: 10,500; Referee: (Switzerland) Walter Hungerbühler (St. Gallen)
Note: The ground was soaking wet and very slippery. Corners 2:4

4 May 1976 Round 21	Basel	2–2	St. Gallen	St. Jakob Stadium, Basel
20:00	Hasler 27' (1:0); Mundschin 32' (2:0)	Summary	66' (pen. 2:1) Stöckl; 80' (2:2) Nasdalla	Attendance: 4,500; Referee: (Switzerland) Gérard Racine (Biel/Bienne)

8 May 1976 Round 22	Sion	5–1	Basel	Stade Tourbillon, Sion
20:15	Vergeres 22' (1:0); Luisier 51' (2:0); Vergeres 58' (3:1); Vergeres 63' (4:1); Vergeres 85' (5:1)	Summary	(yellow card) 17' Tanner; 57' (pen. 2:1) Stohler	Attendance: 2,500; Referee: (Switzerland) Bruno Della Bruna (Lumino)

15 May 1976 Round 23	Basel	5–1	Young Boys	St. Jakob Stadium, Basel
20:00	Stohler 24' (1:1) von Wartburg 30' (2:1); Schönenberger 39' (3:1); Nielsen 46' (4:1); Tanner 83' (5:41)	Summary	3' (0:1) Burkhardt	Attendance: 13,000; Referee: (Switzerland) René Maire (Geneva)

30 May 1976 Round 24	Chênois	1–3	Basel	Stade des Trois-Chêne, Thônex
20:00	Mabillard 88' (1:3)	Summary	13' (0:1) von Wartburg; 36' (0:2) Demarmels; 77' (0:3) Tanner	Attendance: 2,800; Referee: (Switzerland) Peter Scherz

5 June 1976 Round 25	Servette	3–0	Basel	Charmilles Stadium, Geneva
20:15	Barriquand 19' (1:0); Hussner 84' (2:0); Riner 88' (3:0)	Summary		Attendance: 3,500; Referee: (Switzerland) Bruno Galler

13 June 1976 Round 26	Basel	5–2	La Chaux-de-Fonds	Landhof, Basel
20:15	von Wartburg 6' (1:0); Schönenberger 9' (2:0); Stohler 20' (3:0); Mundschin 30' (4:0); Hasler 45' (5:0)	Summary	55' (5:1) Schermesser; 72' (5:2) Zwygart	Attendance: 5,000; Referee: (Switzerland) André Daina

==== Final league table ====
Pos	Team	Pld	W	D	L	GF	GA	GD	Pts	Qualification or relegation
1	Zürich	26	19	6	1	69	26	+43	44	Swiss champions, qualified for 1976–77 European Cup and Swiss Cup winners, entered 1976 Intertoto Cup
2	Servette	26	16	7	3	50	14	+36	39	Swiss Cup runners-up, qualified for 1976–77 Cup Winners' Cup
3	Basel	26	13	8	5	59	38	+21	34	qualified for 1976–77 UEFA Cup
4	Grasshopper Club	26	14	4	8	54	37	+17	32	qualified for 1976–77 UEFA Cup and entered 1976 Intertoto Cup
5	Young Boys	26	11	9	6	41	27	+14	31	entered 1976 Intertoto Cup
6	Xamax	26	11	8	7	37	25	+12	30	
7	St. Gallen	26	8	11	7	41	39	+2	27	entered 1976 Intertoto Cup
8	Lausanne-Sport	26	10	6	10	35	39	−4	26	
9	Sion	26	6	9	11	40	54	−14	21	
10	Chênois	26	5	9	12	30	42	−12	19	
11	Winterthur	26	8	2	16	34	65	−31	18	
12	Lugano	26	5	6	15	19	37	−18	16	Relegated to Nationalliga B
13	La Chaux-de-Fonds	26	5	4	17	27	61	−34	14	Relegated to Nationalliga B
14	Biel-Bienne	26	5	3	18	26	58	−32	13	Relegated to Nationalliga B

Source: rsssf.com
Rules for classification: 1) Points; 2) Goal difference within the league, however with play-off for qualifiers;

=== Swiss Cup ===
27 September 1975 Round of 32	Grenchen	0–2	Basel	Stadium Brühl, Grenchen
20:00	Scheller (yellow card) 50'	Summary	17' (0:1) Nielsen; 74' (0:2) Muhmenthaler	Attendance: 3,500; Referee: (Switzerland) Peter Kellenberger

29 October 1975 Round of 16	Young Boys	3–1	Basel	Wankdorf Stadium, Bern
19:30	Odermatt 3' (1:0); Burkhardt 47' (2:0); Burkhardt 52' (3:0)	Summary	74' (3:1) Schönenberger	Attendance: 23,000; Referee: (Switzerland) Walter Hungerbühler St. Gallen

=== Swiss League Cup ===
9 August 1995 Round of 32	St. Gallen	1–4	Basel	Espenmoos, St. Gallen
20:15	Brander (yellow card) 63'; Schneeberger 81' (1:3)	FCB summary	7' (0:1) Muhmenthaler; 41' (0:2) Muhmenthaler; 52' (0:3) Marti; 88' (1:4) Marti	Attendance: 4,300; Referee: (Switzerland) Otto Wyniger Wetzikon

22 February 1976 Round of 16	Young Fellows Zürich	1–8	Basel	Letzigrund, Zürich
14:30	Senn 11' (1:3)	Summary	3' (0:1) Marti; 7' (0:2) Hasler; 10' (0:3) Muhmenthaler; 24' (1:4) Muhmenthaler; 37' (pen. 1:5) Mundschin; 59' (1:6) Hasler; 63' (1:7) von Wartburg; 75' (1:8) Marti	Attendance: 1,029; Referee: (Switzerland) Gottlieb Barmettler Luzern

28 February 1976 Quarter-final	Grenchen	2–6	Basel	Stadium Brühl, Grenchen
17:00	Braun (yellow card) 21'; Wirth 78' (1:4); Waeber 86' (2:6)	Summary	6' (0:1) von Wartburg; (yellow card) 13' Nielsen; 30' (0:2) Marti; 51' (0:3) Tanner; 74' (0:4) Marti; 80' (1:5) Marti; 85' (1:6) Schönenberger	Attendance: 1,200; Referee: (Switzerland) Mario Osta Oberuzwil

27 April 1976 Semi-final	Basel	3–5 (a.e.t.)	BSC Young Boys	St. Jakob Stadium, Basel
20:00	Mundschin 38' (1:2); Mundschin 58' (2:2); Hasler (yellow card) 63'; Stohler 99' (pen. 3:2); Fischli (yellow card) 113'	Summary	11' (0:1) Burkhardt; 25' (0:2) Rebmann; 101' (pen. 3:3) Odermatt; 103' (3:4) Bruttin; (yellow card) 105' Vögeli; 108' (3:5) Küttel	Attendance: 10,300; Referee: (Switzerland) Mario Osta Oberuzwil

=== UEFA Cup Winners' Cup ===
First round

17 September 1975 First leg	Basel (Switzerland)	1–2	(Spain) Atlético Madrid	St. Jakob Stadium, Basel
20:00	Schönenberger 3' (1:0); Nielsen (yellow card) 43'	Summary	65' (1:1) Gárate; (yellow card) 66' Díaz; 68' (1:2) Ayala; (yellow card) 76' Salcedo	Attendance: 33,000; Referee: (France) Robert Wurtz

1 October 1975 Second leg	Atlético Madrid (Spain)	1–1 (3 – 2 agg.)	(Switzerland) Basel	Vicente Calderón Stadium, Madrid
21:00	Bezerra 74' (1:0)	Summary	(yellow card) 83' Mundschin; 89' (1:1) Demarmels	Attendance: 25,000; Referee: (Austria) Paul Schiller

Atlético Madrid won 3–2 on aggregate.

=== Cup of the Alps ===
Group B

19 July 1975 round 1	Stade de Reims (France)	3–4	(Switzerland) Basel	Reims
20:30	Bianchi 1' (1:0); Bianchi 59' (2:3); Vergnes 75' (3:3)	Summary	40' (1:1) Demarmels; 52' (pen. 1:2) Schönenberger; 54' (1:3) Demarmels; 82' (3:4) Nielsen	Attendance: 6,300; Referee: (Switzerland) Jean Dubach Nidau

26 July 1975 round 2	Basel (Switzerland)	2–2	(France) Olympique Lyonnais	St. Jakob Stadium Basel
20:00	Tanner (1x); Muhmenthaler (1x)	Summary	(1x) Bernad (1x) Chiesa	Attendance: 5,000; Referee: (France) Robert Wurtz

29 July 1975 round 3	Basel (Switzerland)	2–1	(France) Stade de Reims	St. Jakob Stadium Basel
20:00	Stohler 76' (pen. 1:1); Tanner 90' (2:1)	Summary	73' (0:1) Laraignée	Attendance: 4,500; Referee: (France) Robert Helies

2 August 1975 round 4	Olympique Lyonnais (France)	2–2	(Switzerland) Basel	Stade de Gerland, Lyon
20:30	Maillard 25' (1:1); Delestre 75' (2:2)	Summary	20' (0:1) Tanner; 50' (1:2) Muhmenthaler	Attendance: 4,923; Referee: (Switzerland) Ernest Guignet Yverdon

NB: teams did not play compatriots

Group table

Pos	Team	Pld	W	D	L	GF	GA	GD	BP	Pts	
1	Basel	4	2	2	0	10	8	+2	0	6 (Note: 1 bonus point awarded for victory by 3 or more goals)	Advance to final
2	Olympique Lyonnais	4	1	3	0	8	6	+2	0	5	
3	Stade de Reims	4	2	0	2	7	7	0	0	4	
4	Lausanne-Sport	4	0	1	3	3	7	−4	0	1	

Source: rsssf.com
Notes:

Final

5 August 1975 Final	Servette (Switzerland)	3–0	(Switzerland) Basel	Charmilles Stadium, Geneva
20:30	Barriquand 30' (1:0); Hussner 58' (2:0); Pfister 86' (3:0)	Summary		Attendance: 11,000; Referee: (Switzerland) Peter Scherz

== See also ==
- History of FC Basel
- List of FC Basel players
- List of FC Basel seasons

== Sources ==
- Rotblau: Jahrbuch Saison 2015/2016. Publisher: FC Basel Marketing AG. ISBN 978-3-7245-2050-4
- Die ersten 125 Jahre. Publisher: Josef Zindel im Friedrich Reinhardt Verlag, Basel. ISBN 978-3-7245-2305-5
- Verein "Basler Fussballarchiv" Homepage
- Switzerland 1975–76 at RSSSF
- Swiss League Cup at RSSSF
- Cup of the Alps 1975 at RSSSF
