= 1970–71 in Swiss football =

Football in Switzerland
- Season: 1970–71

Men's football
- Nationalliga A: Grasshopper Club
- Nationalliga B: St. Gallen
- 1. Liga: 1. Liga champions: CS Chênois; Group West: CS Chênois; Group Central: SR Delémont; Group South and East: SC Buochs
- Swiss Cup: Servette

Women's football
- Swiss Women's Super League: DFC Aarau

The following is a summary of the 1970–71 season of competitive football in Switzerland.

== Nationalliga A ==
=== Final league table ===
Pos	Team	Pld	W	D	L	GF	GA	GD	Pts	Qualification or relegation
1	Basel	26	18	6	2	67	26	+41	42	To championship play-off
2	Grasshopper Club	26	20	2	4	59	21	+38	42	To championship play-off and entered 1971 Intertoto Cup
3	Lugano	26	11	9	6	50	34	+16	31	Qualified for 1971–72 UEFA Cup and entered 1971 Intertoto Cup
4	Lausanne-Sport	26	12	6	8	51	43	+8	30	
5	Zürich	26	11	6	9	41	42	−1	28	Entered 1971 Intertoto Cup
6	Winterthur	26	11	5	10	36	38	−2	27	
7	Servette	26	8	10	8	39	36	+3	26	Swiss Cup winners, qualified for 1971–72 Cup Winners' Cup and entered 1971 Intertoto Cup
8	Young Boys	26	10	6	10	43	46	−3	26	
9	La Chaux-de-Fonds	26	9	6	11	46	47	−1	24	
10	Biel-Bienne	26	6	9	11	32	43	−11	21	
11	Luzern	26	8	4	14	39	48	−9	20	
12	Sion	26	5	9	12	32	46	−14	19	To relegation play-off
13	Fribourg	26	6	7	13	35	63	−28	19	To relegation play-off
14	Bellinzona	26	1	7	18	24	61	−37	9	Relegated to 1971–72 Nationalliga B

Source: rsssf.com
Rules for classification: 1) Points; 2) Goal difference within the league, however with play-off for qualifiers;

=== Championshio play-off ===
8 June 1971
Play-off

Grasshopper Club	4–3 (a.e.t.)	Basel
Ohlhauser 16'; Grahn 75', 97'; Meier 106'	FCB summary	21' Mundschin; 70' Wenger; 119' (pen.) Benthaus

Wankdorf, Bern
Attendance: 51,000
Referee: (Switzerland) Ulysse Darbellay (Roche)

Grasshopper Club won the championship play-off, thus they qualified for 1971–72 European Cup. Basel as runners-up qualified for 1971–72 UEFA Cup.

=== Relegation play-out ===
9 June 1971
Play-out

Sion	1–0	Fribourg
Elsig 13'

Olympique de la Pontaise, Lausanne
Referee: (Switzerland) Pius Kamber (Zürich)

Sion won the play-out and remained in the top-level. Fribourg relegated to 1971–72 Nationalliga B

== Nationalliga B ==
=== League table ===
Pos	Team	Pld	W	D	L	GF	GA	GD	Pts	Qualification or relegation
1	St. Gallen	26	18	5	3	55	24	+31	41	NLB Champions and promoted to 1971–72 Nationalliga A
2	FC Grenchen	26	18	3	5	53	21	+32	39	Promoted to 1971–72 Nationalliga A
3	Xamax	26	13	5	8	46	32	+14	31	
4	Mendrisiostar	26	9	10	7	28	27	+1	28	
5	SC Brühl	26	11	5	10	45	42	+3	27	
6	FC Aarau	26	7	13	6	28	31	−3	27	
7	Etoile Carouge FC	26	9	8	9	43	43	0	26	
8	FC Monthey	26	9	7	10	44	42	+2	25	
9	FC Chiasso	26	6	11	9	24	36	−12	23	
10	FC Wettingen	26	8	6	12	47	48	−1	22	
11	Vevey-Sports	26	8	6	12	27	41	−14	22	
12	FC Martigny-Sports	26	8	6	12	26	42	−16	22	
13	Young Fellows	26	7	4	15	30	35	−5	18	Relegated to 1971–72 1. Liga
14	Urania Genève Sport	26	3	7	16	23	55	−32	13	Relegated to 1971–72 1. Liga

Source: rsssf.com
Rules for classification: 1) Points; 2) Goal difference within the league, however with play-off for qualifiers;

== 1. Liga ==
=== Group West ===
Pos	Team	Pld	W	D	L	GF	GA	GD	Pts	Qualification or relegation
1	CS Chênois	24	14	6	4	45	24	+21	34	Play-off to Nationalliga B
2	FC Stade Nyonnais	24	13	7	4	55	28	+27	33	Play-off to Nationalliga B
3	FC Dürrenast	24	11	8	5	40	31	+9	30	
4	FC Bern	24	10	7	7	48	35	+13	27	
5	ASI Audax-Friul	24	9	6	9	46	56	−10	24	
6	FC Thun	24	9	5	10	43	43	0	23	
7	FC Meyrin	24	7	8	9	44	38	+6	22	
8	FC Raron	24	7	8	9	30	29	+1	22	
9	Yverdon-Sport FC	24	8	6	10	36	46	−10	22	
10	SC Burgdorf	24	7	7	10	34	42	−8	21	
11	FC Minerva Bern	24	7	7	10	29	43	−14	21	
12	FC Langenthal	24	7	5	12	50	59	−9	19	Relegation to 2. Liga Interregional
13	FC Salgesch	24	5	4	15	33	59	−26	14	Relegation to 2. Liga Interregional

Source: RSSSF
Rules for classification: 1) Points; 2) Goal difference within the league, but decider play-off for qualifiers.

=== Group Central ===
Pos	Team	Pld	W	D	L	GF	GA	GD	Pts	Qualification or relegation
1	SR Delémont	24	16	5	3	55	21	+34	37	Play-off to Nationalliga B
2	FC Le Locle-Sports	24	13	3	8	55	41	+14	29	Play-off to Nationalliga B
3	FC Porrentruy	24	10	8	6	38	27	+11	28	
4	FC Solothurn	24	12	3	9	45	39	+6	27	
5	FC Breite Basel	24	11	5	8	42	37	+5	27	
6	FC Nordstern Basel	24	11	4	9	50	43	+7	26	
7	FC Breitenbach	24	12	1	11	40	48	−8	25	
8	FC Concordia Basel	24	9	5	10	37	40	−3	23	
9	FC Turgi	24	7	8	9	37	40	−3	22	
10	FC Baden	24	8	6	10	29	33	−4	22	
11	FC Emmenbrücke	24	8	5	11	41	46	−5	21	
12	FC Moutier	24	8	2	14	44	53	−9	18	Relegation to 2. Liga Interregional
13	SC Zofingen	24	3	1	20	26	71	−45	7	Relegation to 2. Liga Interregional

Source: RSSSF
Rules for classification: 1) Points; 2) Goal difference within the league, but decider play-off for qualifiers.

=== Group South and East ===
Pos	Team	Pld	W	D	L	GF	GA	GD	Pts	Qualification or relegation
1	SC Buochs	24	18	2	4	54	25	+29	38	Play-off to Nationalliga B
2	AS Gambarogno	24	14	7	3	51	18	+33	35	Play-off to Nationalliga B
3	FC Frauenfeld	24	14	4	6	46	30	+16	32	
4	FC Chur	24	13	4	7	48	31	+17	30	
5	FC Red Star Zürich	24	11	4	9	27	35	−8	26	
6	FC Locarno	24	10	5	9	33	26	+7	25	
7	SC Zug	24	10	4	10	42	26	+16	24	
8	FC Rorschach	24	7	7	10	30	43	−13	21	
9	FC Amriswil	24	8	3	13	26	38	−12	19	
10	FC Vaduz	24	7	4	13	32	42	−10	18	
11	FC Blue Stars Zürich	24	7	3	14	25	46	−21	17	
12	FC Küsnacht	24	5	4	15	26	55	−29	14	Relegation to 2. Liga Interregional
13	FC Uster	24	5	3	16	24	49	−25	13	Relegation to 2. Liga Interregional

Source: RSSSF
Rules for classification: 1) Points; 2) Goal difference within the league, but decider play-off for qualifiers.

=== Promotion play-off ===
The three group winners played a two legged tie against one of the runners-up to decide the three finalists. The games were played on 6 and 13 June 1971.

==== Qualification round ====
Team 1	Score	Team 2
SR Delémont	0–1	AS Gambarogno
AS Gambarogno	1–0	SR Delémont

AS Gambarogno win 2–0 on aggregate and continue to the finals.

Team 1	Score	Team 2
FC Stade Nyonnais	2–6	SC Buochs
SC Buochs	1–1	FC Stade Nyonnais

SC Buochs win 7–3 on aggregate and continue to the finals.

Team 1	Score	Team 2
CS Chênois	2–2	FC Le Locle-Sports
FC Le Locle-Sports	0–4	CS Chênois

CS Chênois win 6–2 on aggregate and continue to the finals.

==== Final round ====
The three first round winners competed in a single round-robin to decide the two promotion slots. The games were played on 20 and 27 June and on 4 July 1971.

Pos	Team	Pld	W	D	L	GF	GA	GD	Pts	CHE	GAM	BUO
1	CS Chênois	2	1	1	0	4	1	+3	3	—	—	3–0
2	AS Gambarogno	2	0	2	0	1	1	0	2	1–1	—	—
3	SC Buochs	2	0	1	1	0	3	−3	1	—	0–0	—

Source: RSSSF
Rules for classification: 1) Points; 2) Goal difference; 3) Goals scored; 4) Head-to-head points; 5) Away goals scored; 6) Draw.

CS Chênois won 1. Liga championship and promotion to 1971–72 Nationalliga B. AS Gambarogno were runners-up and were also promoted to 1971–72 Nationalliga B.

== Swiss Cup ==
The competition was played in a knockout system. In the case of a draw, extra time was played. If the teams were still level after extra time, the match was replayed at the away team's ground. Here, in case of a draw after extra time, the replay was to be decided with a penalty shoot-out. The final was held in the Wankdorf Stadium in Bern.

=== Early rounds ===
The routes of the finalists to the final were:

- Third round: NLA teams with a bye.
- Fourth round: Servette-Etoile Carouge 2:1. Lugano-Young Fellows 1:1 (a.e.t.). Replay: Young Fellows-Lugano 0:2.
- Fifth round: Servette-YB 5:1. Luzern-Lugano 1:2 (a.e.t.).
- Quarter-finals: Zürich-Servette 1:2. Lugano-GC 2:1.
- Semi-finals: Servette-Lausanne 2:1. Mendrisiostar-Lugano 0:2.

=== Final ===
Easter Monday 12 May 1971

Servette	2–0	Lugano
Desbiolles 55'; Marchi 78'	Fussball-Schweiz

Wankdorf, Bern
Attendance: 36,500
Referee: (Switzerland) Pius Paul Kamber, Zürich

== Swiss Clubs in Europe ==
- Basel as 1969–70 Nationalliga A champions: 1970–71 European Cup
- Zürich as 1969–70 Swiss Cup winners: 1970–71 Cup Winners' Cup
- Lausanne-Sport: Entered 1970 Intertoto Cup
- Grasshopper Club: Entered 1970 Intertoto Cup
- Servette: Entered 1970 Intertoto Cup
- Winterthur: Entered 1970 Intertoto Cup

=== Basel ===
==== European Cup ====
===== First round =====
16 September 1970 First leg	Spartak Moscow (Soviet Union)	3 – 2	(Switzerland) Basel	Luzhniki Stadium, Moscow
	Osyanin 17' (1:0); Osyanin 66' (2:0); Papayev 76' (3:0)	UEFA Summary; FCB Summary	Odermatt 78' (3:1); Benthaus 83' (3:2)	Attendance: 80,000; Referee: (England) Jim Finney

30 September 1970 Second leg	Basel (Switzerland)	2 – 1 (4 – 4 agg.)	(Soviet Union) Spartak Moscow	St. Jakob Stadium, Basel
	Siegenthaler 48'; Balmer 55'; Fischli (yellow card) 58'	UEFA Summary; FCB Summary	Khusainov 84'	Attendance: 44,000; Referee: (Austria) Ferdinand Marschall

Spartak Moscow 4–4 Basel on aggregate. Basel won on away goals.

Second round

21 October 1970 First leg	Ajax (Netherlands)	3 – 0	(Switzerland) Basel	Olympic Stadium (Amsterdam)
	Keizer 17' van Dijk 23'; Hulshoff 63'	UEFA Summary; FCB Summary		Attendance: 42,000; Referee: (Bulgaria) Petar Nikolov

4 November 1970 Second leg	Basel (Switzerland)	1 – 2	(Netherlands) Ajax	St. Jakob Stadium, Basel
20:00	Odermatt 36' (pen.)	UEFA Summary; FCB Summary	Rijnders 69'; Neeskens 72'	Attendance: 31,000; Referee: (Republic of Ireland) Derry Barrett

Ajax won 5–1 on aggregate.

=== Zürich ===
==== Cup Winners' Cup ====
===== First round =====
16 September 1970 First leg	Zürich (Switzerland)	7–1	(Iceland) ÍB Akureyri	Letzigrund, Zürich
	Stierli 1'; Martinelli 34'; Volkert 44'; Volkert 49'; Künzli 51'; Volkert 62'; Künzli 69'	FCZ summary	71' Árnason	Attendance: 5,700; Referee: (Romania) Alexandru Pîrvu

22 September 1970 Second leg	ÍB Akureyri (Iceland)	0–7	(Switzerland) Zürich	Espenmoos, St. Gallen
		FCZ summary	6' Künzli; 13' Künzli; 17' Volkert; 19' Künzli; 55' Volkert; 83' Heer; 87' Grünig	Attendance: 2,000; Referee: (Romania) Cornel Niţescu
Note: Corners 6:4

Zürich won 14–1 on aggregate

===== Second round =====
21 October 1970 First leg	Club Brugge (Belgium)	2–0	(Switzerland) Zürich	Klokke Stadion, Bruges
	Rensenbrink 18'; Carteus 38'	FCZ summary		Attendance: 16,000; Referee: (Poland) Brunon Piotrowicz
Note: Corners 10:4

4 November 1970 Second leg	Zürich (Switzerland)	3–2	(Belgium) Club Brugge	Letzigrund, Zürich
	Axelsson 21' (o.g.); Martinelli (yellow card) 23'; Grünig 55'; Künzli 83'	FCZ summary	4' Carteus; (yellow card) 23' Moelaert; (yellow card) 60' Houwaart; 74' Rensenbrink	Attendance: 11,500; Referee: (Turkey) Ertugrul Dilek

=== Lausanne ===
==== Intertoto Cup ====
===== Group B3 =====
Pos	Team	Pld	W	D	L	GF	GA	GD	Pts	MAR	ZSO	AIK	LS
1	(France) Marseille	6	3	2	1	17	8	+9	8	—	3–1	6–2	4–0
2	(Poland) Zagłębie Sosnowiec	6	3	1	2	11	10	+1	7	3–2	—	2–1	3–1
3	(Sweden) AIK	6	1	3	2	10	14	−4	5	2–2	2–1	—	1–1
4	(Switzerland) Lausanne-Sport	6	0	4	2	5	11	−6	4	0–0	1–1	2–2	—

Source: mogiel.net
Rules for classification: 1) Points; 2) Goal difference; 3) Goals scored; 4) Head-to-head points; 5) Away goals scored; 6) Draw.

=== Grasshopper Club ===
==== Intertoto Cup ====
===== Group B1 =====
Pos	Team	Pld	W	D	L	GF	GA	GD	Pts	EIN	GCZ	NOR	WSC
1	(West Germany) Eintracht Braunschweig	6	4	2	0	14	4	+10	10	—	2–0	1–0	3–0
2	(Switzerland) Grasshopper Club	6	3	1	2	8	10	−2	7	1–5	—	2–1	1–0
3	(Sweden) Norrköping	6	1	2	3	9	9	0	4	2–2	1–1	—	3–0
4	(Austria) Wiener Sport-Club	6	1	1	4	5	13	−8	3	1–1	1–3	3–2	—

Source: mogiel.net
Rules for classification: 1) Points; 2) Goal difference; 3) Goals scored; 4) Head-to-head points; 5) Away goals scored; 6) Draw.

=== Servette ===
==== Intertoto Cup ====
===== Group B2 =====
Pos	Team	Pld	W	D	L	GF	GA	GD	Pts	SLA	FIR	GAIS	SER
1	(Czechoslovakia) Slavia Prague	6	5	1	0	16	7	+9	11	—	1–1	4–0	1–0
2	(Austria) First Vienna	6	2	2	2	12	9	+3	6	2–3	—	3–3	4–1
3	(Sweden) GAIS	6	1	2	3	7	13	−6	4	2–3	0–2	—	1–0
4	(Switzerland) Servette	6	1	1	4	5	11	−6	3	2–4	1–0	1–1	—

Source: mogiel.net
Rules for classification: 1) Points; 2) Goal difference; 3) Goals scored; 4) Head-to-head points; 5) Away goals scored; 6) Draw.

=== Winterthur ===
==== Intertoto Cup ====
===== Group B5 =====
Pos	Team	Pld	W	D	L	GF	GA	GD	Pts	WIS	HVI	UTR	WIN
1	(Poland) Wisła Kraków	6	5	0	1	11	3	+8	10	—	1–0	1–0	5–1
2	(Denmark) Hvidovre	6	3	1	2	11	6	+5	7	0–1	—	2–1	5–1
3	(Netherlands) Utrecht	6	3	0	3	12	10	+2	6	1–0	1–3	—	4–3
4	(Switzerland) Winterthur	6	0	1	5	8	23	−15	1	1–3	1–1	1–5	—

Source: mogiel.net
Rules for classification: 1) Points; 2) Goal difference; 3) Goals scored; 4) Head-to-head points; 5) Away goals scored; 6) Draw.

== Sources ==
- Switzerland 1970–71 at RSSSF
- European Competitions 1970–71 at RSSSF.com
- Cup finals at Fussball-Schweiz
- Intertoto history at Pawel Mogielnicki's Page
- Josef Zindel (2018). FC Basel 1893. Die ersten 125 Jahre (in German). Basel: Friedrich Reinhardt Verlag. ISBN 978-3-7245-2305-5.

Preceded by 1969–70	Seasons in Swiss football	Succeeded by 1971–72
