= Walter Geisser =

Swiss footballer (born 1950)

Personal information
- Full name: Walter Geisser
- Date of birth: 14 August 1950 (age 76)
- Place of birth: Glarus, Switzerland
- Height: 1.75 m (5 ft 9 in)
- Position: Defender

Senior career*
Years	Team	Apps	(Gls)
1973–1975	FC Nordstern Basel	51	(2)
1975–1984	FC Basel	224	(2)
- * Club domestic league appearances and goals

Walter Geisser (born 1950) is a Swiss former footballer who played in the 1970s and 1980s. He played as a defender.

Geisser played from 1973 to 1975 for Nordstern Basel, who at that time played in the Nationalliga B, the second tier of Swiss football.

He then joined FC Basel's first team for their 1975–76 season under team manager Helmut Benthaus. After playing in two test games, three Cup of the Alps matches and one Swiss League Cup match, Geisser played his domestic league debut for his new club in the home game at the St. Jakob Stadium on 16 August 1975 as Basel won 5–1 against Grasshopper Club. In the 1976–77 Nationalliga A season Geisser was part of the championship winning team. At the end of the championship phase Servette FC Genève and Basel were level on 29 points. They therefore had to play a play-off for champions. This play-off was held at the Wankdorf Stadium in Bern in front of 50,000 supporters. Basel won the match 2–1, their goals being scored by Walter Mundschin and Arthur von Wartburg.

Geisser scored his first domestic league goal for his club in the home game on 12 April 1980 as Basel won 3–1 against Lausanne-Sport. Only a few weeks later he scored his second domestic league goal as Basel won 5–0 against Luzern. At the end of this season Basel won the Championship. This was the club's eighth championship title in their history and the seventh and last under trainer Benthaus.

Between the years 1975 and 1984 Geisser played a total of 415 games for Basel scoring a total of seven goals. 224 of these games were in the Nationalliga A, 42 were in the Swiss Cup or Swiss League Cup, 31 of these games were in European competitions, European Cup, UEFA Cup, UEFA Cup Winners' Cup and Cup of the Alps, and 118 were friendly games. He scored the afore mentioned two goals in the domestic league, one in the Swiss Cup and the other four were scored during the test games.

== Honours ==
- Swiss League: 1976–77, 1979–80

== Sources ==
- Rotblau: Jahrbuch Saison 2017/2018. Publisher: FC Basel Marketing AG. ISBN 978-3-7245-2189-1
- Die ersten 125 Jahre. Publisher: Josef Zindel im Friedrich Reinhardt Verlag, Basel. ISBN 978-3-7245-2305-5
- Verein "Basler Fussballarchiv" Homepage
