= Bruno Rahmen =

Swiss footballer and manager (born 1948)

Personal information
- Full name: Bruno Rahmen
- Date of birth: 15 October 1948 (age 78)
- Place of birth: Switzerland
- Positions: Midfielder; defender

Youth career
- –1966: FC Riehen

Senior career*
Years	Team	Apps	(Gls)
–1966	FC Riehen		
1966–1976	FC Basel		
1976–1982	FC Luzern		
1982–1983	BSC Old Boys		

Managerial career
- 1982–1983: BSC Old Boys
- 1983–1985: FC Luzern
- 1992: FC Basel
- * Club domestic league appearances and goals

Bruno Rahmen (born 15 October 1948) is a former Swiss football player and manager.

== Private life ==
After his football career, Rahmen worked for the Basler chemical industry and advanced to Sales Executive before his retirement. He married Marlis in 1966, and they have two sons, Patrick and Micha, both of whom also became professional footballers. From July 2007 until October 2011, Patrick Rahmen was trainer and manager of the FC Basel U-21 squad, presently he is assistant to Thorsten Fink at Hamburger SV in the Bundesliga.

== Football career ==
Rahmen started his football career with the youth teams of FC Riehen and also played in their amateur 2. Liga first team. In 1966, he signed for FC Basel and played with them for ten years, winning the Swiss League Championship five times, the Swiss Cup twice, and the Swiss League Cup once.

In the summer of 1976, Rahmen transferred to FC Luzern (then in the second division) and played for them for five years, winning promotion with his team in the 1978/79 season. Bruno Rahmen finished his playing career as player-manager by BSC Old Boys in the top Swiss Amateur League.

During the 1983–1985 period, Rahmen was the manager of FC Luzern. In 1992, he was also caretaker manager of Basel for a short time, together with Karl Odermatt, after Ernst August Künnecke was sacked and before Friedel Rausch took over.

== Honours ==
Basel

- Swiss League: 1967, 1969, 1970, 1972, 1973
- Swiss Cup: 1967, 1975
- Swiss League Cup: 1973
- Coppa delle Alpi: 1969, 1970

Luzern

- Promotion to Swiss Super League: 1979
