= Paul Fischli =

Swiss footballer and manager (born 1945)

Personal information
- Date of birth: 6 May 1945 (age 81)
- Place of birth: Glarus, Switzerland
- Position: Defender

Youth career
- until 1965: FC Glarus

Senior career*
| Years | Team | Apps | (Gls) |
| 1965–1968 | Young Fellows | | |
| 1968–1979 | FC Basel | | |
| 1979–1981 | FC Münchenstein | | |
| 1981–1982 | FC Aarau | | |

Managerial career
- 1982: FC Aarau
- * Club domestic league appearances and goals

Paul Fischli (born 6 May 1945) is a Swiss former football player and manager. He played as a defender throughout the 1960s, 1970s and early 1980s.

== Career ==
As a sixteen-year-old, Paul Fischli played his debut in the FC Glarus first team in the third amateur division. The team were promoted to the 2. Liga at the end of the season. Fischli started playing semi-professionally in 1965 with FC Young Fellows Zürich in the Nationalliga B (later renamed Challenge League). Young Fellows were promoted at the end of the season to the Nationalliga A (later renamed Swiss Super League). Fischli played for Young Fellows for three years, but the team was relegated at the end of the 1967–68 season and the club sold the entire team.

Fischli signed for FC Basel in August 1968. He became an integral part of the Basel team alongside the likes of René Hasler, Ottmar Hitzfeld and Karl Odermatt and went on to win five League titles and two Swiss Cups between 1968 and 1979. During his entire period in Basel, Fischli was never a fully professional soccer player; he worked for a sports firm.

In the summer of 1979 he joined FC Münchenstein in the third amateur league as player-manager. At the end of the season FC Münchenstein were promoted to the 2. Liga. In the two years under Fischli the team had a club record unbeaten run of 45 games.

Fischli joined FC Aarau in 1981 and retired as player in 1982, aged 37. He remained at the club as first team manager for a short while.

== Honours ==
Basel

- Swiss League: 1969, 1970, 1972, 1973, 1977
- Swiss Cup: 1975
- Swiss League Cup: 1973

Aarau

- Swiss League Cup: 1982
