= Paul Garbani =

Swiss football manager (born 1927)

Personal information
- Date of birth: 21 June 1927 (age 99)
- Place of birth: Switzerland
- Position: Forward

Senior career*
Years	Team	Apps	(Gls)
1950–1951	FC Moutier		

Managerial career
- 1963–1964: Étoile Carouge FC
- 1965–1966: FC Porrentruy
- 1969–1972: Neuchâtel Xamax
- 1974–1976: Lausanne Sport
- 1976–1977: Étoile Carouge FC
- 1978–1985: Vevey Sports
- 1988–1989: Urania Genève Sport
- 1989–1990: FC Montreux
- 2006–2007: Lausanne Sport
- 2007: Lausanne Sport (assistant)
- * Club domestic league appearances and goals

Paul Garbani (born 21 June 1927) is a Swiss football manager.
