= Thierry Cotting =

Swiss football manager

Personal information
- Date of birth: 13 September 1963 (age 63)

Managerial career
- Years: Team
- 1996–1997: Étoile Carouge FC
- 2002–2007: Étoile Carouge FC
- 2007–2008: FC Lausanne-Sport
- 2009–2010: CS Chênois
- 2010–2012: Étoile Carouge FC
- 2015–2016: Servette FC (caretaker)

Thierry Cotting (born 13 September 1963) is a Swiss football manager.
