= Rodolfo Lippo =

Finnish footballer (born 2004)

Personal information
- Date of birth: 13 May 2004 (age 22)
- Height: 1.86 m (6 ft 1 in)
- Position: Centre-back

Team information
- Current team: Lausanne-Sport
- Number: 54

Youth career
- Union SG

Senior career*
Years	Team	Apps	(Gls)
2022–2023	Echichens	18	(0)
2023–2024	US Terre Sainte	24	(2)
2024–2025	La Sarraz-Eclépens	11	(0)
2025–	Lausanne-Sport II	32	(4)
2025–	Lausanne-Sport	2	(0)
- * Club domestic league appearances and goals as of 28 September 2026

Rodolfo Lippo (born 13 May 2004) is a Finnish professional footballer who plays as a centre-back for Lausanne-Sport in the Swiss Super League.

== Personal life ==
Lippo was raised in Belgium to a Finnish mother and an Italian-Belgian father, and moved to Switzerland when aged 17. He is eligible to represent Finland, Belgium and Italy.
