= 1971–72 in Swiss football =

Football in Switzerland
- Season: 1971–72

Men's football
- Nationalliga A: Basel
- Nationalliga B: Chiasso
- 1. Liga: 1. Liga champions: Young Fellows; Group West: Stade Nyonnais; Group Central: SC Buochs; Group South and East: Young Fellows
- Swiss Cup: Zürich

Women's football
- Swiss Women's Super League: DFC Aarau

The following is a summary of the 1971–72 season of competitive football in Switzerland.

== Nationalliga A ==
=== Final league table ===
Pos	Team	Pld	W	D	L	GF	GA	GD	Pts	Qualification
1	Basel	26	18	7	1	66	28	+38	43	Swiss champions, qualified for 1972–73 European Cup
2	Zürich	26	17	5	4	55	28	+27	39	Swiss Cup winners, qualified for 1972–73 Cup Winners' Cup and entered 1972 Intertoto Cup
3	Grasshopper Club	26	16	6	4	56	24	+32	38	Qualified for 1972–73 UEFA Cup and entered 1972 Intertoto Cup
4	Lausanne-Sport	26	11	8	7	50	36	+14	30	Qualified for 1972–73 UEFA Cup
5	Young Boys	26	12	5	9	46	31	+15	29	Entered 1972 Intertoto Cup
6	Winterthur	26	12	4	10	37	32	+5	28	Entered 1972 Intertoto Cup
7	Sion	26	9	8	9	37	36	+1	26	
8	Servette	26	10	5	11	39	47	−8	25	
9	Lugano	26	8	7	11	33	39	−6	23	
10	Grenchen	26	6	11	9	27	40	−13	23	
11	La Chaux-de-Fonds	26	7	7	12	25	45	−20	21	
12	St. Gallen	26	4	7	15	27	46	−19	15	To relegation play-out
13	Luzern	26	6	3	17	24	49	−25	15	To relegation play-out
14	Biel-Bienne	26	2	5	19	26	67	−41	9	Relegated to 1972–73 Nationalliga B

Source: rsssf.com
Rules for classification: 1) Points; 2) Goal difference within the league, however with play-off for qualifiers;

=== Relegation play out ===
The decider was played on 13 June 1972 at the Hardturm in Zürich.

Team 1	Score	Team 2
St. Gallen	4–1	Luzern

St. Gallen won and remain in the top-level. Luzern are relegated to 1972–73 Nationalliga B.

== Nationalliga B ==
=== Final league table ===
Pos	Team	Pld	W	D	L	GF	GA	GD	Pts	Qualification
1	FC Chiasso	26	17	3	6	45	25	+20	37	NLB Champions and promoted to 1972–73 Nationalliga A
2	FC Fribourg	26	15	4	7	41	22	+19	34	Promoted to 1972–73 Nationalliga A
3	Xamax	26	12	9	5	59	41	+18	33	
4	Vevey-Sports	26	12	8	6	44	39	+5	32	
5	FC Martigny-Sports	26	9	10	7	46	37	+9	28	
6	AC Bellinzona	26	10	6	10	48	39	+9	26	
7	Mendrisiostar	26	8	10	8	36	30	+6	26	
8	FC Wettingen	26	9	7	10	34	42	−8	25	
9	CS Chênois	26	10	5	11	39	54	−15	25	
10	FC Aarau	26	8	7	11	32	31	+1	23	
11	Etoile Carouge FC	26	6	11	9	31	34	−3	23	
12	SC Brühl	26	7	8	11	35	49	−14	22	
13	FC Monthey	26	7	7	12	35	49	−14	21	Relegated to 1972–73 1. Liga
14	AS Gambarogno	26	0	9	17	21	54	−33	9	Relegated to 1972–73 1. Liga

Source: rsssf.com
Rules for classification: 1) Points; 2) Goal difference within the league, however with play-off for qualifiers;

== 1. Liga ==
=== Group West ===
Pos	Team	Pld	W	D	L	GF	GA	GD	Pts	Qualification or relegation
1	FC Stade Nyonnais	24	17	4	3	51	22	+29	38	Play-off to Nationalliga B
2	FC Raron	24	15	4	5	45	29	+16	34	Play-off to Nationalliga B
3	FC Bern	24	12	8	4	49	30	+19	32	
4	FC Meyrin	24	12	2	10	35	38	−3	26	
5	ASI Audax-Friul	24	10	5	9	41	35	+6	25	
6	Yverdon-Sport FC	24	9	5	10	36	40	−4	23	
7	FC Le Locle	24	6	10	8	31	30	+1	22	
8	Central Fribourg	24	8	6	10	39	53	−14	22	
9	Urania Genève Sport	24	8	5	11	41	34	+7	21	
10	FC Dürrenast	24	7	7	10	39	41	−2	21	
11	FC Thun	24	9	3	12	42	44	−2	21	
12	CS La Tour-de-Peilz	24	8	4	12	40	49	−9	20	Relegation to 2. Liga Interregional
13	FC Minerva Bern	24	1	5	18	19	63	−44	7	Relegation to 2. Liga Interregional

Source: RSSSF
Rules for classification: 1) Points; 2) Goal difference within the league, but decider play-off for qualifiers.

=== Group Central ===
Pos	Team	Pld	W	D	L	GF	GA	GD	Pts	Qualification or relegation
1	SC Buochs	24	14	7	3	49	31	+18	35	Play-off to Nationalliga B
2	FC Emmenbrücke	24	14	5	5	67	38	+29	33	Play-off to Nationalliga B
3	FC Concordia Basel	24	14	4	6	48	35	+13	32	
4	FC Laufen	24	11	6	7	51	36	+15	28	
5	FC Breite Basel	24	11	4	9	42	40	+2	26	
6	FC Solothurn	24	11	4	9	43	41	+2	26	
7	FC Porrentruy	24	9	6	9	37	28	+9	24	
8	FC Nordstern Basel	24	9	5	10	45	37	+8	23	
9	FC Baden	24	8	6	10	42	40	+2	22	
10	SR Delémont	24	9	3	12	34	36	−2	21	
11	FC Turgi	24	5	7	12	34	52	−18	17	
12	FC Breitenbach	24	4	5	15	23	63	−40	13	Relegation to 2. Liga Interregional
13	SC Burgdorf	24	3	6	15	31	69	−38	12	Relegation to 2. Liga Interregional

Source: RSSSF
Rules for classification: 1) Points; 2) Goal difference within the league, but decider play-off for qualifiers.

=== Group South and East ===
Pos	Team	Pld	W	D	L	GF	GA	GD	Pts	Qualification or relegation
1	FC Young Fellows Zürich	24	17	3	4	64	29	+35	37	Play-off to Nationalliga B
2	FC Vaduz	24	11	6	7	47	35	+12	28	To decider for second place
3	SC Zug	24	10	8	6	27	19	+8	28	To decider for second place
4	US Giubiasco	24	11	5	8	36	32	+4	27	
5	FC Locarno	24	11	5	8	36	32	+4	27	
6	FC Frauenfeld	24	11	4	9	37	34	+3	26	
7	FC Gossau	24	8	8	8	45	40	+5	24	
8	FC Blue Stars Zürich	24	10	4	10	43	47	−4	24	
9	FC Red Star Zürich	24	9	5	10	33	39	−6	23	
10	FC Chur	24	8	4	12	24	29	−5	20	
11	FC Tössfeld	24	8	3	13	30	44	−14	19	
12	FC Rorschach	24	6	4	14	28	43	−15	16	Relegation to 2. Liga Interregional
13	FC Amriswil	24	4	5	15	23	50	−27	13	Relegation to 2. Liga Interregional

Source: RSSSF
Rules for classification: 1) Points; 2) Goal difference within the league, but decider play-off for qualifiers; 3) Goals scored; 4) Head-to-head points; 5) Away goals scored; 6) Draw.

==== Decider for second place ====
The decider match for second place was played on 30 May 1972 in Küssnacht.

Team 1	Score	Team 2
SC Zug	4–1	FC Vaduz

SC Zug win and advance to play-offs. FC Vaduz remain in the division.

=== Promotion play-off ===
The three group winners played a two legged tie against one of the runners-up to decide the three finalists. The games were played on

==== Qualification round ====
Team 1	Score	Team 2
FC Emmenbrücke	0–3	FC Young Fellows Zürich
FC Young Fellows Zürich	4–1	FC Emmenbrücke

FC Young Fellows Zürich win 7–1 on aggregate and continue to the finals.

Team 1	Score	Team 2
FC Raron	3–3	SC Buochs
SC Buochs	1–1	FC Raron

SC Buochs win on away goals and continue to the finals.

Team 1	Score	Team 2
FC Stade Nyonnais	1–1	SC Zug
SC Zug	1–1	FC Stade Nyonnais

FC Stade Nyonnais qualified as better classed team in the regular season and continue to the finals.

==== Final round ====
The three first round winners competed in a single round-robin to decide the two promotion slots. The games were played on

Pos	Team	Pld	W	D	L	GF	GA	GD	Pts	YFJ	BUO	NYO
1	FC Young Fellows Zürich	2	2	0	0	7	3	+4	4	—	2–1	—
2	SC Buochs	2	1	0	1	4	4	0	2	—	—	3–2
3	FC Stade Nyonnais	2	0	0	2	4	8	−4	0	2–5	—	—

Source: RSSSF

FC Young Fellows Zürich are 1. Liga champions, SC Buochs are runners-up and these two teams are promoted.

== Swiss Cup ==
The competition was played in a knockout system. In the case of a draw, extra time was played. If the teams were still level after extra time, the match was replayed at the away team's ground. Here, in case of a draw after extra time, the replay was to be decided with a penalty shoot-out. The final was held in the Wankdorf Stadium in Bern.

=== Early rounds ===
The routes of the finalists to the final were:

- Third round: NLA teams with a bye.
- Fourth round: Zürich-Bellinzona 5:2. Basel-Monthey 3:1.
- Fifth round: Brühl-Zürich 0:2. La Chaux-de-Fonds-Basel 0:3.
- Quarter-finals: Zürich-Fribourg 2:1. GC-Basel 1:1 (a.e.t.). Replay: Basel-GC 3:2.
- Semi-finals: St. Gallen-Zürich 2:3. YB-Basel 0:2.

=== Final ===
22 May 1972
14:30

Zürich	1 – 0 (a.e.t.)	Basel
Jeandupeux 45'; Jeandupeux (yellow card) 90+1'	FCB summary FCZ summary Fussball-Schweiz

Wankdorf, Bern
Attendance: 45,000
Referee: (Switzerland) Rudolf Scheurer (Bettlach)

== Swiss clubs in Europe ==
- Grasshopper Club as 1970–71 Nationalliga A champions: 1971–72 European Cup and entered 1971 Intertoto Cup
- Servette as 1970–71 Swiss Cup winners: 1971–72 Cup Winners' Cup and entered 1971 Intertoto Cup
- Basel as league runners-up team: 1971–72 UEFA Cup
- Lugano as league third placed team: 1971–72 UEFA Cup and entered 1971 Intertoto Cup
- Zürich: entered 1971 Intertoto Cup
- Young Boys: entered 1971 Intertoto Cup

=== Grasshopper Club ===
==== European Cup ====
===== First round =====
15 September 1971 First leg	Reipas Lahti (Finland)	1–1	(Switzerland) Grasshopper Club	Lahden kisapuisto, Lahti
	Lindholm 75'	Report	Ohlhauser 63'	Attendance: 1,276; Referee: Einar Boström (Sweden)

29 September 1971 Second leg	Grasshopper Club (Switzerland)	8–0	(Finland) Reipas Lahti	Hardturm, Zürich
	Müller 1', 39', 71', 85'; Gröbli 31'; Schneeberger 45'; Meier 70'; Mayer 77'	Report		Attendance: 4,941; Referee: Franz Wöhrer (Austria)

Grasshopper won 9–1 on aggregate.

===== Second round =====
20 October 1971 First leg	Grasshopper Club (Switzerland)	0–2	(England) Arsenal	Hardturm, Zürich
		Report	Kennedy 2'; Graham 88'	Attendance: 14,964; Referee: Michel Kitabdjian (France)

3 November 1971 Second leg	Arsenal (England)	3–0	(Switzerland) Grasshopper Club	Highbury, London
	Kennedy 40'; George 47'; Radford 84'	Report		Attendance: 31,106; Referee: Ove Dahlberg (Sweden)

Arsenal won 5–0 on aggregate.

==== Intertoto Cup ====
===== Group 7 =====
Pos	Team	Pld	W	D	L	GF	GA	GD	Pts	SAL	DJU	BRA	GCZ
1	Austria Salzburg	6	5	1	0	16	3	+13	11	—	1–1	2–0	3–0
2	(Sweden) Djurgården	6	3	1	2	8	8	0	7	0–3	—	2–3	1–0
3	(Czechoslovakia) Inter Bratislava	6	2	0	4	17	16	+1	4	1–4	1–2	—	9–2
4	(Switzerland) Grasshopper Club	6	1	0	5	7	21	−14	2	1–3	0–2	4–3	—

Source: mogiel.net
Rules for classification: 1) Points; 2) Goal difference; 3) Goals scored; 4) Head-to-head points; 5) Away goals scored; 6) Draw.

=== Servette ===
==== Cup Winners' Cup ====
===== First round =====
15 September 1971 First leg	Servette (Switzerland)	2–1	(England) Liverpool	Stade des Charmilles, Geneva
	Dörfel 25'; Barriquand 48'	Report	Lawler 80'	Attendance: 21,000; Referee: Robert Wurtz (France)

29 September 1971 Second leg	Liverpool (England)	2–0	(Switzerland) Servette	Anfield, Liverpool
	Hughes 27'; Heighway 59'	Report		Attendance: 38,591; Referee: Rudi Glöckner (East Germany)

Liverpool won 3–2 on aggregate.

==== Intertoto Cup ====
===== Group 3 =====
Pos	Team	Pld	W	D	L	GF	GA	GD	Pts	SER	SZB	LIN	B03
1	(Switzerland) Servette	6	3	2	1	13	4	+9	8	—	2–0	7–0	0–1
2	(Poland) Szombierki Bytom	6	3	1	2	13	7	+6	7	0–1	—	4–1	3–0
3	(Austria) LASK	6	1	3	2	8	16	−8	5	2–2	2–2	—	0–0
4	(Denmark) B 1903	6	1	2	3	4	11	−7	4	1–1	4–1	1–3	—

Source: mogiel.net
Rules for classification: 1) Points; 2) Goal difference; 3) Goals scored; 4) Head-to-head points; 5) Away goals scored; 6) Draw.

=== Basel ===
==== UEFA Cup ====
===== First round =====
15 September 1971 First leg	Basel (Switzerland)	1–2	(Spain) Real Madrid	St. Jakob Stadium, Basel
20:00	Hasler 32'; Ramseier (yellow card) 48'	UEFA report FCB Summary	(yellow card) 27' Grosso; 33' Aguilar; 75' Santillana	Attendance: 32,059; Referee: (England) Kenneth Howard Burns

29 September 1971 Second leg	Real Madrid (Spain)	2–1 (4–2 agg.)	(Switzerland) Basel	Santiago Bernabéu Stadium
21:00	Aguilar 48'; Santillana 78'	UEFA report FCB Summary	57' Siegenthaler	Attendance: 61,861; Referee: (Italy) Aurelio Angonese

Real Madrid won 4–2 on aggregate.

=== Lugano ===
==== UEFA Cup ====
===== First round =====
15 September 1971 First leg	Lugano (Switzerland)	1–3	(Poland) Legia Warsaw	Cornaredo Stadium, Lugano
	Luttrop 83' (pen.)	Report	Ćmikiewicz 20'; Stachurski 61'; Nowak 88'	Attendance: 3,000

29 September 1971 Second leg	Legia Warsaw (Poland)	0–0	(Switzerland) Lugano	Polish Army Stadium, Warsaw
		Report		Attendance: 10,000

Legia Warsaw won 3–1 on aggregate.

=== Zürich ===
==== Intertoto Cup ====
===== Group 1 =====
Pos	Team	Pld	W	D	L	GF	GA	GD	Pts	HER	ZÜR	TRE	AB
1	(West Germany) Hertha Berlin	6	5	0	1	16	7	+9	10	—	3–2	2–1	4–0
2	(Switzerland) Zürich	6	4	1	1	13	8	+5	9	3–2	—	1–0	2–1
3	(Czechoslovakia) Jednota Trenčín	6	2	1	3	9	7	+2	5	0–2	1–1	—	4–0
4	(Denmark) AB	6	0	0	6	4	20	−16	0	1–3	1–4	1–3	—

Source: mogiel.net
Rules for classification: 1) Points; 2) Goal difference; 3) Goals scored; 4) Head-to-head points; 5) Away goals scored; 6) Draw.

4 July 1971 Round 1	Zürich (Switzerland)	2–1	(Denmark) Akademisk Boldklub	Kleine Allmend, Frauenfeld
	Jeandupeux 73' (1:1); Künzli 74' (2:1)	FCZ summary	57' (0:1) Hansen	Attendance: 2,500; Referee: (Switzerland) Walter Hungerbühler (St. Gallen)

11 July 1971 Round 2	Jednota Trenčín (Czechoslovakia)	1–1	(Switzerland) Zürich	Bratislava
	Lintner 9' (1:0)	FCZ summary	84' (1:1) Jeandupeux	Attendance: 800; Referee: (Czechoslovakia) Bohumil Smejkal

18 July 1971 Round 3	Zürich (Switzerland)	1–0	(Czechoslovakia) Jednota Trenčín	Stadion Kleinfeld, Kriens
	Künzli 12' (1:0)	FCZ summary		Attendance: 1,000; Referee: (Switzerland) Marcel Despland (Yverdon-les-Bains)

25 July 1971 Round 4	Hertha Berlin (West Germany)	3–2	(Switzerland) Zürich	Berlin
	Steffenhagen 52' (1:1); Rumor 61' (2:1); Beer 83' (3:1)	FCZ summary	45' (0:1) Konietzka; 85' (3:2) Martinelli	Attendance: 15,000; Referee: (Germany) Beer

1 August 1971 Round 5	Akademisk Boldklub (Denmark)	1–4	(Switzerland) Zürich	Gladsaxe Municipality, in Copenhagen
	Hansen 17' (1:0)	FCZ summary	18' (1:1) Künzli; 44' (1:2) Künzli; 78' (1:3) Konietzka; 84' (1:4) Künzli	Attendance: 500

7 August 1971 Round 6	Zürich (Switzerland)	3–2	(West Germany) Hertha Berlin	Schützenwiese, Winterthur
	Künzli 32' (1:2); Jeandupeux 53' (2:2); Kuhn 82' (3:2)	FCZ summary	13' (0:1) Hermandung; 23' (0:2) Horr	Attendance: 7,800; Referee: (Switzerland) Müller

=== Young boys ===
==== Intertoto Cup ====
===== Group 6 =====
Pos	Team	Pld	W	D	L	GF	GA	GD	Pts	EIN	MAL	ZWA	YB
1	(West Germany) Eintracht Braunschweig	6	5	0	1	10	2	+8	10	—	0–1	1–0	2–0
2	(Sweden) Malmö FF	6	4	0	2	15	8	+7	8	0–1	—	4–0	6–3
3	(Poland) Zagłębie Wałbrzych	6	2	0	4	3	8	−5	4	0–1	2–0	—	1–0
4	(Switzerland) Young Boys	6	1	0	5	8	18	−10	2	1–5	2–4	2–0	—

Source: mogiel.net
Rules for classification: 1) Points; 2) Goal difference; 3) Goals scored; 4) Head-to-head points; 5) Away goals scored; 6) Draw.

== Sources ==
- Switzerland 1971–72 at RSSSF
- League Cup finals at RSSSF
- European Competitions 1971–72 at RSSSF.com
- Cup finals at Fussball-Schweiz
- Intertoto history at Pawel Mogielnicki's Page
- Josef Zindel (2018). FC Basel 1893. Die ersten 125 Jahre (in German). Basel: Friedrich Reinhardt Verlag. ISBN 978-3-7245-2305-5.

Preceded by 1970–71	Seasons in Swiss football	Succeeded by 1972–73
