= Louis Maurer (footballer) =

Swiss footballer and manager (1904-1988)

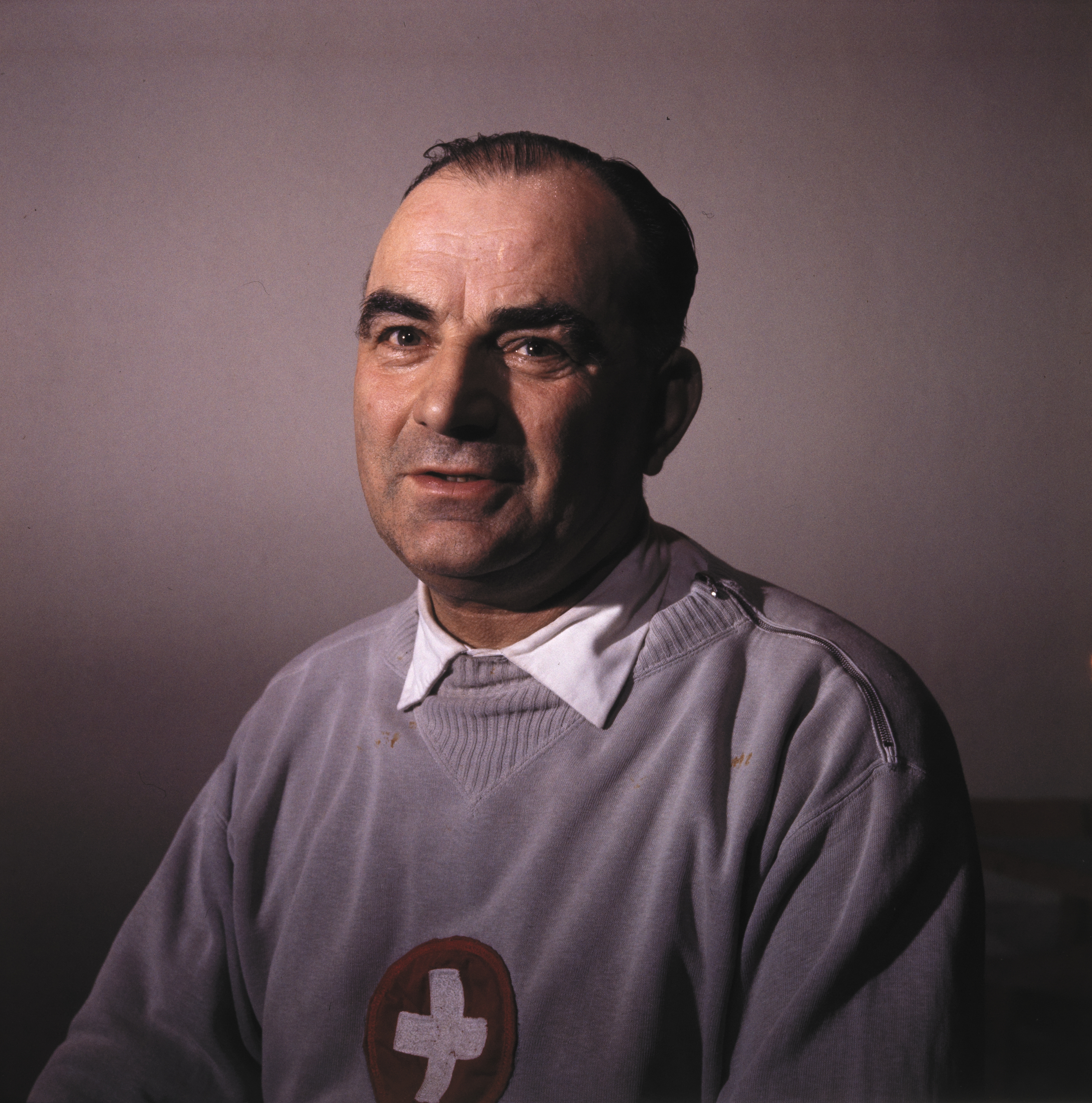
- Louis Maurer in 1963

Personal information
- Date of birth: 21 February 1904
- Place of birth: Vevey, Switzerland
- Date of death: 1 May 1988 (aged 84)
- Position: Goalkeeper

Senior career*
Years	Team	Apps	(Gls)
- Signal FC
- Hyères FC
- US Blida
1929–1934	Lausanne-Sport		
- Hyères FC

Managerial career
- 1943–1945: Blue Stars Zürich
- 1945–1950: Lausanne-Sport
- 1950–1957: Fribourg
- 1958–1959: Marseille
- 1959: R.U.S. Tournaisienne
- 1962–1966: FC Zürich
- 1966–1970: Lugano
- 1970: Bellinzona
- 1970–1971: Switzerland
- 1972–1974: Lausanne-Sport
- 1976–1977: Bellinzona
- * Club domestic league appearances and goals

Louis Maurer (21 February 1904 – 1 May 1988) was a Swiss football player and manager. He played as a goalkeeper.

Maurer coached FC Blue Stars Zürich, Lausanne Sports, FC Fribourg, Marseille, R. Union Sportive Tournaisienne, FC Zürich, FC Lugano, AC Bellinzona and Switzerland. In his coaching career, he won two national championship titles and three Swiss Cups.
