= Paul Dörflinger =

German footballer

Personal information
- Date of birth: 23 January 1955
- Date of death: 4 May 1982 (aged 27)
- Position: Forward

Youth career
- –1975: SpVgg Rheinfelden

Senior career*
Years	Team	Apps	(Gls)
1975–1976	FC Basel	1	(0)
1976–1977	SV Weil		
1978–1979	SC Freiburg	37	(20)
1979	MSV Duisburg	4	(0)
1979–1980	Hertha BSC	3	(0)
1980–1981	SC Freiburg	11	(4)
- * Club domestic league appearances and goals

Paul Dörflinger (23 January 1955 – 4 May 1982) was a German footballer who played in the 1970s and early 1980s. He played as forward.

== Career ==
Dörflinger played his youth football for SpVgg Rheinfelden in Rheinfelden (Baden). He joined FC Basel's first team for their 1975–76 season under head-coach Helmut Benthaus. Here he played with some quality players, for example the Swiss international players Peter Ramseier, Peter Marti, Serge Muhmenthaler and Jörg Stohler as well as the Dane Eigil Nielsen. Dörflinger played his domestic league debut for the club in the home game in the St. Jakob Stadium on 10 April 1975 as Basel played a goalless draw with Xamax.

During his one season with the club, Dörflinger played a total of five games for Basel scoring a total of two goals. One of these games were in the Nationalliga A and four were friendly games. He scored both his goals during the test game against FV Lörrach in Maulburg as Basel won 3–0.

Following this, Dörflinger played for the SV Weil before he transferred to newly promoted 2. Bundesliga team SC Freiburg for 1978–79 season. There he was supposed to take over from the promotion hero Wolfgang Schüler, who had moved on to Karlsruher SC. Dörflinger succeeded in doing this, compensating him by scoring 20 goals in 37 matches and thus helping greatly against the relegation of the team.

Dörflinger then moved to MSV Duisburg in the Bundesliga for a price of around DM 450,000. She did not become a regular starter in Duisburg and after six months and just four appearances, he moved on to league competitor Hertha BSC. In his first game, a 3–0 home win over Fortuna Düsseldorf and again just three game days later against Bayer Leverkusen, he scored a brace. At the end of the season, however, it was not enough to keep the team in the league, because Uerdingen had a two goal better difference. After relegation, Uwe Klimaschefski became the new Hertha coach. Under him, Dörflinger only made three appearances, also due to his injury, therefore he returned to Freiburg shortly after the start of the season. Back with SC Freiburg Dörflinger scored a goal in his first appearance with the club, a 4-1 win against Kickers Offenbach. At the end of this season Dörflinger ended his active playing career for health reasons.

Dörflinger died on 4 May 1982 at the age of 27 due to Colorectal cancer.

== Sources ==
- Die ersten 125 Jahre. Publisher: Josef Zindel im Friedrich Reinhardt Verlag, Basel. ISBN 978-3-7245-2305-5
- Verein "Basler Fussballarchiv" Homepage
- Harald Tragmann, Harald Voß: Das Hertha Kompendium. 2., überarb. und erw. Auflage. Harald Voß, Berlin 2002, ISBN 3-935759-05-3.
- Jürgen Bitter: Deutschlands Fußball. Das Lexikon. Alle Namen, alle Begriffe in mehr als 14500 Einträgen. Mit Statistiken und Tabellen. Herbig, München 2008, ISBN 978-3-7766-2558-5.
