= Jürg Wenger (footballer) =

Swiss footballer (born 1950)

Personal information
- Full name: Jürg Wenger
- Date of birth: 25 December 1950 (age 75)
- Place of birth: Switzerland
- Position: Goalkeeper

Senior career*
| Years | Team | Apps | (Gls) |
| 1975–1977 | FC Basel | 17 | (0) |
- * Club domestic league appearances and goals

Jürg Wenger (born 25 December 1950) is a Swiss former footballer who played two seasons for FC Basel as goalkeeper.

Wenger joined Basel's first team for their 1975–76 season under team manager Helmut Benthaus. After playing between the posts in ten test games and one Cup of the Alps match, Wenger played his domestic league debut for the club in the home game at the St. Jakob Stadium on 10 April as Basel played a goalless draw with Xamax.

Wenger was part of the championship winning team in the 1976–77 Nationalliga A season. At the end of the championship phase Servette FC Genève and Basel were level on 29 points. They therefore had to play a play-off for champions. This play-off was held at the Wankdorf Stadium in Bern in front of 50,000 supporters. Basel won the match 2–1, their goals being scored by Walter Mundschin and Arthur von Wartburg.

In his two seasons by the club, Wenger played a total of 40 games for Basel. 17 of these games were in the Nationalliga A, two in the Swiss League Cup, one in the UEFA Cup against Glentoran, three in the Cup of the Alps and 17 were friendly games.

== Honours ==
- Swiss League: 1976-77

== Sources ==
- Die ersten 125 Jahre. Publisher: Josef Zindel im Friedrich Reinhardt Verlag, Basel. ISBN 978-3-7245-2305-5
- Verein "Basler Fussballarchiv" Homepage
