= Michel Amacker =

Swiss footballer (born 1956)

Personal information
- Date of birth: 29 September 1956
- Position: Midfielder

Youth career
- until 1973: FC Raron

Senior career*
Years	Team	Apps	(Gls)
1973–1975	FC Raron	25	(4)
1975–1976	FC Basel	2	(0)
1976–1977	FC Raron	24	(6)
1977–1979	FC La Chaux-de-Fonds	27	(5)
1979–1980	FC Raron	22	(3)
- * Club domestic league appearances and goals

Michel Amacker (born 29 September 1956) is a Swiss retired footballer who played in the 1970s as midfielder.

Amacker played his youth football with FC Raron and advanced to their first team during their 1973–74 season as they were promoted from the 1st League to the Nationalliga B, the second tier of Swiss football. He played with them the next season as first choice mid-fielder in 25 of their 26 league matches, scoring four goals, as they eventually prevented relegation in a play-off match against Mendrisiostar.

Amacker joined FC Basel's first team for their 1975–76 season under head-coach Helmut Benthaus. After one test match and one match in the Cup of the Alps, Amacker played his domestic league debut for the club in the away game on 23 August 1975 as Basel won 3–2 against Winterthur.

Amacker stayed with the club one season, in which he played a total of six games for Basel without scoring a goal. Two of these games were in the Nationalliga A, one in the Cup of the Alps and three were friendly games.

Following this season with Basel, Amacker returned to Raron for the 1976–77 season. But the team suffered relegation and he moved on to play for La Chaux-de-Fonds, who also played in the second tier of Swiss football. In his second season with LCdF, Amacker and the club were Nationalliga B champions and won promotion.

After these two seasons Amacker returned once more to his club of origin.

== Sources ==
- Die ersten 125 Jahre. Publisher: Josef Zindel im Friedrich Reinhardt Verlag, Basel. ISBN 978-3-7245-2305-5
- Verein "Basler Fussballarchiv" Homepage
