= 1969–70 in Swiss football =

Football in Switzerland
- Season: 1969–70

Men's football
- Nationalliga A: Basel
- Nationalliga B: Sion
- 1. Liga: 1. Liga champions: Vevey-Sports; Group West: Vevey-Sports; Group Central: SR Delémont; Group South and East: FC Baden
- Swiss Cup: Zürich

The following is a summary of the 1969–70 season of competitive football in Switzerland.

== Nationalliga A ==
=== Final league table ===
Pos	Team	Pld	W	D	L	GF	GA	GD	Pts	Qualification
1	Basel	26	15	7	4	59	23	+36	37	Swiss Champions, qualified for 1970–71 European Cup
2	Lausanne-Sport	26	12	12	2	54	36	+18	36	Entered 1970 Intertoto Cup
3	Zürich	26	15	4	7	49	29	+20	34	Swiss Cup winners, qualified for 1970–71 Cup Winners' Cup
4	Grasshopper Club	26	12	7	7	39	24	+15	31	Entered 1970 Intertoto Cup
5	Young Boys	26	13	5	8	52	41	+11	31	
6	Lugano	26	10	10	6	43	37	+6	30	
7	Servette	26	10	9	7	53	37	+16	29	Entered 1970 Intertoto Cup
8	Winterthur	26	11	5	10	50	41	+9	27	Entered 1970 Intertoto Cup
9	La Chaux-de-Fonds	26	9	3	14	36	55	−19	21	
10	Bellinzona	26	6	8	12	26	43	−17	20	
11	Fribourg	26	7	5	14	27	37	−10	19	
12	Biel-Bienne	26	7	5	14	28	55	−27	19	
13	Wettingen	26	6	3	17	33	62	−29	15	Relegated to 1970–71 Nationalliga B
14	St. Gallen	26	6	3	17	28	57	−29	15	Relegated to 1970–71 Nationalliga B

Source: rsssf.com
Rules for classification: 1) Points; 2) Goal difference within the league, however with play-off for qualifiers;

== Nationalliga B ==
=== Final league table ===
Pos	Team	Pld	W	D	L	GF	GA	GD	Pts	Qualification
1	FC Sion	26	14	9	3	62	27	+35	37	NLB Champions and promoted to 1970–71 Nationalliga A
2	FC Luzern	26	15	5	6	58	39	+19	35	Promoted to 1970–71 Nationalliga A
3	FC Grenchen	26	13	6	7	49	28	+21	32	
4	Mendrisiostar	26	8	13	5	41	25	+16	29	
5	Young Fellows Zürich	26	10	8	8	42	31	+11	28	
6	FC Xamax	26	11	6	9	48	45	+3	28	
7	FC Chiasso	26	10	6	10	37	35	+2	26	
8	SC Brühl	26	8	10	8	34	38	−4	26	
9	Etoile Carouge FC	26	9	6	11	43	47	−4	24	
10	FC Aarau	26	9	6	11	22	26	−4	24	
11	Urania Genève Sport	26	7	9	10	37	41	−4	23	
12	FC Martigny-Sports	26	9	5	12	26	46	−20	23	
13	FC Thun	26	3	12	11	25	45	−20	18	Relegated to 1970–71 1. Liga
14	FC Langenthal	26	3	5	18	25	76	−51	11	Relegated to 1970–71 1. Liga

Source: rsssf.com
Rules for classification: 1) Points; 2) Goal difference within the league, however with play-off for qualifiers;

== 1. Liga ==
=== Group West ===
Pos	Team	Pld	W	D	L	GF	GA	GD	Pts	Qualification or relegation
1	Vevey-Sports	24	16	3	5	49	20	+29	35	Play-off to Nationalliga B
2	FC Monthey	24	14	4	6	66	34	+32	32	Play-off to Nationalliga B
3	FC Stade Nyonnais	24	11	6	7	48	32	+16	28	
4	FC Raron	24	9	9	6	34	33	+1	27	
5	FC Meyrin	24	10	5	9	40	41	−1	25	
6	CS Chênois	24	9	6	9	29	31	−2	24	
7	FC Le Locle	24	11	2	11	41	46	−5	24	
8	FC Minerva Bern	24	9	6	9	24	36	−12	24	
9	FC Bern	24	9	3	12	42	34	+8	21	
10	Yverdon-Sport FC	24	6	7	11	30	36	−6	19	
11	ASI Audax-Friul	24	7	5	12	23	45	−22	19	
12	US Campagnes GE	24	6	5	13	26	39	−13	17	To relegation play-out
13	ES FC Malley	24	7	3	14	31	56	−25	17	To relegation play-out

Source: RSSSF
Rules for classification: 1) Points; 2) Goal difference within the league, but decider play-off for qualifiers.

=== Group Central ===
Pos	Team	Pld	W	D	L	GF	GA	GD	Pts	Qualification or relegation
1	SR Delémont	24	15	7	2	47	20	+27	37	Play-off to Nationalliga B
2	FC Moutier	24	14	5	5	47	26	+21	33	Play-off to Nationalliga B
3	SC Burgdorf	24	11	7	6	43	28	+15	29	
4	FC Dürrenast	24	10	8	6	51	33	+18	28	
5	FC Porrentruy	24	8	11	5	34	26	+8	27	
6	FC Breite Basel	24	9	6	9	47	44	+3	24	
7	FC Solothurn	24	7	7	10	39	37	+2	21	
8	FC Emmenbrücke	24	7	6	11	24	32	−8	20	
9	FC Nordstern Basel	24	8	4	12	30	43	−13	20	
10	SC Zofingen	24	7	5	12	34	46	−12	19	
11	FC Breitenbach	24	7	5	12	37	52	−15	19	
12	FC Concordia Basel	24	6	6	12	27	42	−15	18	Play-out against relegation
13	FC Sursee	24	6	5	13	28	59	−31	17	Relegation to 2. Liga Interregional

Source: RSSSF
Rules for classification: 1) Points; 2) Goal difference within the league, but decider play-off for qualifiers.

=== Group South and East ===
Pos	Team	Pld	W	D	L	GF	GA	GD	Pts	Qualification or relegation
1	FC Baden	24	14	6	4	35	20	+15	34	Play-off to Nationalliga B
2	SC Buochs	24	13	6	5	49	27	+22	32	Play-off to Nationalliga B
3	FC Locarno	24	9	9	6	24	21	+3	27	
4	SC Zug	24	8	10	6	28	20	+8	26	
5	FC Amriswil	24	9	8	7	40	34	+6	26	
6	FC Küsnacht	24	8	8	8	26	27	−1	24	
7	FC Frauenfeld	24	9	5	10	30	33	−3	23	
8	FC Rorschach	24	7	9	8	29	32	−3	23	
9	FC Uster	24	9	5	10	35	39	−4	23	
10	FC Vaduz	24	7	8	9	32	33	−1	22	
11	FC Red Star Zürich	24	5	11	8	32	36	−4	21	
12	SCI Juventus Zürich	24	6	6	12	23	35	−12	18	Play-out against relegation
13	FC Oerlikon/Polizei ZH	24	4	5	15	28	54	−26	13	Relegation to 2. Liga Interregional

Source: RSSSF
Rules for classification: 1) Points; 2) Goal difference within the league, but decider play-off for qualifiers.

=== Promotion play-off ===
The three group winners played a two legged tie against one of the runners-up to decide the finalists. The games were played on 7 and 14 June 1970.

==== Qualification round ====
Team 1	Score	Team 2
FC Baden	0–4	FC Monthey
FC Monthey	3–1	FC Baden

FC Monthey won 7–1 on aggregate and continued to the finals. FC Baden remain in the division.

Team 1	Score	Team 2
SR Delémont	3–3	SC Buochs
SC Buochs	3–1	SR Delémont

SC Buochs won 6–4 on aggregate and continued to the finals. SR Delémont qualified for finals as lucky loser

Team 1	Score	Team 2
Vevey-Sports	3–1	FC Moutier
FC Moutier	2–3	Vevey-Sports

Vevey-Sports won 6–3 on aggregate and continued to the finals. FC Moutier remain in the division.

==== Final round ====
The matches were played on 21 and 28 June.

Team 1	Score	Team 2
SC Buochs	1–0	Vevey-Sports
Vevey-Sports	2–1	SC Buochs

Vevey-Sports declaired 1. Liga champions and were promoted to 1970–71 Nationalliga B.

Team 1	Score	Team 2
FC Monthey	1–0	SR Delémont
SR Delémont	3–2	FC Monthey

==== Play-off for second place ====
This took place on 5 July at Stadion Neufeld in Bern

Team 1	Score	Team 2
FC Monthey	1–0	SR Delémont

FC Monthey won and were promoted to 1970–71 Nationalliga B. SR Delémont remain in the division.

=== Relegation play-out ===
==== First round ====
The play-outs took place on 21 June.

Team 1	Score	Team 2
US Campagnes GE	1–2	ES FC Malley

ES FC Malley won and continued in the final. US Campagnes GE were relegated directly to 2. Liga Interregional.

Team 1	Score	Team 2
FC Concordia Basel	3–1	SCI Juventus Zürich

FC Concordia Basel continued in the final. SCI Juventus Zürich were directly relegated to 2. Liga Interregional.

==== Final ====
The final took place on 28 June 1970.

Team 1	Score	Team 2
ES FC Malley	0–3	FC Concordia Basel

FC Concordia Basel remain in the division. ES FC Malley were relegated to 2. Liga Interregional.

== Swiss Cup ==
The competition was played in a knockout system. In the case of a draw, extra time was played. If the teams were still level after extra time, the match was replayed at the away team's ground. Here, in case of a draw after extra time, the replay was to be decided with a penalty shoot-out. This season would enclude a first test with two legged quarter- and semi-finals. The final was held in the Wankdorf Stadium in Bern.

=== Early rounds ===
The routes of the finalists to the final were:

- Third round: teams from the NLA with a bye.
- Fourth round: Küsnacht-Zürich 1:8. Basel-Minerva 10:0.
- Fifth round: Zürich-GC 5:1. Basel-Grenchen 3:2.
- Quarter-finals: First leg: Zürich-Mendrisio 1:1; Return leg: Mendrisio-Zürich 1:3 (a.e.t.). (agg. 2:4). Xamax-Basel 0:2. Basel-Xamax 5:2 (agg. 7:2).
- Semi-finals: First leg: Lugano-Zürich 0:2 Return leg: Zürich-Lugano 3:1 (agg. 5:1). Servette-Basel 0:2 Basel-Servette 4:1 (agg. 6:1).

=== Final ===
18 May 1970
Final

Zürich	4 – 1 (a.e.t.)	Basel
Volkert (yellow card) 36'; Quentin 74' (1:1); Künzli 92' (2:1); Künzli 101' (3:1); Corti 113' (4:1)	FCB summary FCZ summary Fussball-Schweiz	62' (0:1) Odermatt

Wankdorf, Bern
Attendance: 47,500
Referee: (Switzerland) Roland Marendaz Lausanne

Zürich won 4–1 after extra time.

== Swiss Clubs in Europe ==
- Basel as 1968–69 Nationalliga A champions: 1969–70 European Cup
- St. Gallen as 1968–69 Swiss Cup winners: 1969–70 Cup Winners' Cup
- Young Boys: Entered 1969 Intertoto Cup
- Lugano: Entered 1969 Intertoto Cup
- Bellinzona: Entered 1969 Intertoto Cup
- Servette: Entered 1969 Intertoto Cup
- La Chaux-de-Fonds: Entered 1969 Intertoto Cup

=== Basel ===
==== European Cup ====
===== First round =====
17 September 1969 First leg	Basel (Switzerland)	0 – 0	(Scotland) Celtic	St. Jakob Stadium, Basel
		Report		Attendance: 37,587; Referee: Rudolf Glöckner (East Germany)

1 October 1969 Second leg	Celtic (Scotland)	2 – 0 (2 – 0 agg.)	(Switzerland) Basel	Celtic Park, Glasgow
	Hood 1'; Gemmell 70'	Report		Attendance: 49,976; Referee: Gyula Emsberger (Hungary)

Celtic won 2–0 on aggregate.

=== St. Gallen ===
==== Cup Winners' Cup ====
===== First round =====
Team 1	Agg.	Team 2	1st leg	2nd leg
Frem (Denmark)	2–2 (a)	(Switzerland) St. Gallen	2–1	0–1

===== Second round =====
Team 1	Agg.	Team 2	1st leg	2nd leg
Levski-Spartak (Bulgaria)	4–0	(Switzerland) St. Gallen	4–0	0–0

=== Young Boys ===
==== Intertoto Cup ====
===== Group 5 =====
Pos	Team	Pld	W	D	L	GF	GA	GD	Pts	NOR	RWI	HAN	YB
1	(Sweden) Norrköping	6	3	1	2	11	8	+3	7	—	3–2	1–0	1–2
2	(Austria) Rapid Wien	6	2	2	2	13	7	+6	6	0–0	—	2–0	8–1
3	(West Germany) Hannover 96	6	2	2	2	7	8	−1	6	3–2	1–1	—	1–1
4	(Switzerland) Young Boys	6	2	1	3	8	16	−8	5	1–4	2–0	1–2	—

Source: mogiel.net
Rules for classification: 1) Points; 2) Goal difference; 3) Goals scored; 4) Head-to-head points; 5) Away goals scored; 6) Draw.

=== Lugano ===
==== Intertoto Cup ====
===== Group 2 =====
Pos	Team	Pld	W	D	L	GF	GA	GD	Pts	SZB	ÖST	GAE	LUG
1	(Poland) Szombierki Bytom	6	3	2	1	17	6	+11	8	—	2–1	1–0	11–0
2	(Sweden) Östers IF	6	3	2	1	11	8	+3	8	3–1	—	3–2	1–0
3	(Netherlands) Go Ahead Eagles	6	1	3	2	10	8	+2	5	2–2	1–1	—	1–1
4	(Switzerland) Lugano	6	0	3	3	3	19	−16	3	0–0	2–1	0–4	—

Source: mogiel.net
Rules for classification: 1) Points; 2) Goal difference; 3) Goals scored; 4) Head-to-head points; 5) Away goals scored; 6) Draw.

=== Bellinzona ===
==== Intertoto Cup ====
===== Group 4 =====
Pos	Team	Pld	W	D	L	GF	GA	GD	Pts	ŽIL	ÖRE	NEC	BEL
1	(Czechoslovakia) Žilina	6	4	1	1	12	7	+5	9	—	4–1	2–1	3–0
2	(Sweden) Örebro	6	2	2	2	9	7	+2	6	3–0	—	1–1	1–2
3	(Netherlands) NEC	6	1	4	1	8	7	+1	6	1–1	0–0	—	2–0
4	(Switzerland) Bellinzona	6	1	1	4	6	14	−8	3	1–2	0–3	3–3	—

Source: mogiel.net
Rules for classification: 1) Points; 2) Goal difference; 3) Goals scored; 4) Head-to-head points; 5) Away goals scored; 6) Draw.

=== Servette ===
==== Intertoto Cup ====
===== Group 1 =====
Pos	Team	Pld	W	D	L	GF	GA	GD	Pts	MAL	KAI	MAR	SER
1	(Sweden) Malmö FF	6	4	1	1	15	8	+7	9	—	4–0	1–0	4–2
2	(West Germany) Kaiserslautern	6	3	0	3	9	8	+1	6	1–3	—	6–0	1–0
3	(France) Marseille	6	1	3	2	3	9	−6	5	1–1	1–0	—	1–1
4	(Switzerland) Servette	6	1	2	3	7	9	−2	4	4–2	0–1	0–0	—

Source: mogiel.net
Rules for classification: 1) Points; 2) Goal difference; 3) Goals scored; 4) Head-to-head points; 5) Away goals scored; 6) Draw.

=== La Chaux-de-Fonds ===
==== Intertoto Cup ====
===== Group 9 =====
Pos	Team	Pld	W	D	L	GF	GA	GD	Pts	ODR	BEV	CDF	B13
1	(Poland) Odra Opole	6	4	1	1	11	4	+7	9	—	2–0	3–0	2–0
2	(Belgium) Beveren-Waas	6	2	2	2	8	6	+2	6	0–0	—	4–0	1–1
3	(Switzerland) La Chaux-de-Fonds	6	3	0	3	9	13	−4	6	3–2	3–2	—	3–1
4	(Denmark) B 1913	6	1	1	4	4	9	−5	3	1–2	0–1	1–0	—

Source: mogiel.net
Rules for classification: 1) Points; 2) Goal difference; 3) Goals scored; 4) Head-to-head points; 5) Away goals scored; 6) Draw.

== Sources ==
- Switzerland 1969–70 at RSSSF
- European Competitions 1969–70 at RSSSF.com
- Cup finals at Fussball-Schweiz
- Intertoto history at Pawel Mogielnicki's Page
- Josef Zindel (2018). FC Basel 1893. Die ersten 125 Jahre (in German). Basel: Friedrich Reinhardt Verlag. ISBN 978-3-7245-2305-5.

Preceded by 1968–69	Seasons in Swiss football	Succeeded by 1970–71
