= Marc Duvillard =

Swiss footballer and manager (born 1952)

Personal information
- Date of birth: 22 November 1952 (age 73)
- Position: Forward

Senior career*
Years	Team	Apps	(Gls)
1972–1975	CS Chênois		
1975–1977	FC Lausanne-Sport		
1977–1979	CS Chênois		
1979–1981	Neuchâtel Xamax		
1981–1983	FC La Chaux-de-Fonds		

Managerial career
- 1983–1985: FC La Chaux-de-Fonds
- 1985–1991: FC Lugano
- 1993–1994: FC Lausanne-Sport
- * Club domestic league appearances and goals

Marc Duvillard (born 22 November 1952) is a retired Swiss football striker and later manager.
