= 1970 Intertoto Cup =

In the 1970 Intertoto Cup no knock-out rounds were contested, and therefore no winner was declared.

== Group stage ==
The teams were divided into thirteen groups of four teams each, five in the 'A' region and eight in the 'B' region.

=== Group A1 ===
Pos	Team	Pld	W	D	L	GF	GA	GD	Pts
1	(Czechoslovakia) Slovan Bratislava	6	4	2	0	11	5	+6	10
2	(West Germany) Borussia Dortmund	6	3	0	3	12	10	+2	6
3	(Belgium) Standard Liège	6	1	2	3	10	13	−3	4
4	(Sweden) Malmö FF	6	1	2	3	9	14	−5	4

=== Group A2 ===
Pos	Team	Pld	W	D	L	GF	GA	GD	Pts
1	(West Germany) Hamburg	6	4	2	0	9	4	+5	10
2	(Netherlands) ADO Den Haag	6	4	1	1	12	5	+7	9
3	(Sweden) IFK Göteborg	6	0	3	3	11	19	−8	3
4	(Belgium) Anderlecht	6	0	2	4	10	14	−4	2

=== Group A3 ===
Pos	Team	Pld	W	D	L	GF	GA	GD	Pts
1	(Czechoslovakia) Union Teplice	6	4	1	1	19	9	+10	9
2	(Netherlands) Twente	6	2	3	1	13	12	+1	7
3	(Sweden) Djurgården	6	1	2	3	8	13	−5	4
4	(West Germany) Hannover	6	0	4	2	8	14	−6	4

==== Group Phase ====
27 May 1970	FC Twente (Netherlands)	4 – 1	(Sweden) Djurgården
		Report

30 May 1970	Hannover 96 (Germany)	2 – 2	(Netherlands) FC Twente
		Report

3 June 1970	Union Teplice (Czech Republic)	6 – 2	(Netherlands) FC Twente
		Report

6 June 1970	FC Twente (Netherlands)	2 – 0	(Czech Republic) Union Teplice
		Report	-

13 June 1970	Djurgården (Sweden)	2 – 2	(Netherlands) FC Twente
		Report

20 June 1970	FC Twente (Netherlands)	1 – 1	(Germany) Hannover 96
		Report	-

=== Group A4 ===
Pos	Team	Pld	W	D	L	GF	GA	GD	Pts
1	(Netherlands) MVV	6	4	2	0	15	8	+7	10
2	(Czechoslovakia) Žilina	6	3	1	2	16	9	+7	7
3	(Sweden) Örebro	6	2	2	2	4	9	−5	6
4	(Belgium) Waregem	6	0	1	5	2	11	−9	1

=== Group A5 ===
Pos	Team	Pld	W	D	L	GF	GA	GD	Pts
1	(Czechoslovakia) Košice	6	4	1	1	12	3	+9	9
2	(Sweden) Åtvidaberg	6	4	1	1	6	4	+2	9
3	(West Germany) Duisburg	6	1	2	3	3	8	−5	4
4	(Netherlands) Holland Sport	6	1	0	5	6	12	−6	2

=== Group B1 ===
Pos	Team	Pld	W	D	L	GF	GA	GD	Pts	EIN	GCZ	NOR	WSC
1	(West Germany) Eintracht Braunschweig	6	4	2	0	14	4	+10	10	—	2–0	1–0	3–0
2	(Switzerland) Grasshopper Club	6	3	1	2	8	10	−2	7	1–5	—	2–1	1–0
3	(Sweden) Norrköping	6	1	2	3	9	9	0	4	2–2	1–1	—	3–0
4	(Austria) Wiener Sport-Club	6	1	1	4	5	13	−8	3	1–1	1–3	3–2	—

Source: mogiel.net
Rules for classification: 1) Points; 2) Goal difference; 3) Goals scored; 4) Head-to-head points; 5) Away goals scored; 6) Draw.

=== Group B2 ===
Pos	Team	Pld	W	D	L	GF	GA	GD	Pts	SLA	FIR	GAIS	SER
1	(Czechoslovakia) Slavia Prague	6	5	1	0	16	7	+9	11	—	1–1	4–0	1–0
2	(Austria) First Vienna	6	2	2	2	12	9	+3	6	2–3	—	3–3	4–1
3	(Sweden) GAIS	6	1	2	3	7	13	−6	4	2–3	0–2	—	1–0
4	(Switzerland) Servette	6	1	1	4	5	11	−6	3	2–4	1–0	1–1	—

Source: mogiel.net
Rules for classification: 1) Points; 2) Goal difference; 3) Goals scored; 4) Head-to-head points; 5) Away goals scored; 6) Draw.

=== Group B3 ===
Pos	Team	Pld	W	D	L	GF	GA	GD	Pts	MAR	ZSO	AIK	LS
1	(France) Marseille	6	3	2	1	17	8	+9	8	—	3–1	6–2	4–0
2	(Poland) Zagłębie Sosnowiec	6	3	1	2	11	10	+1	7	3–2	—	2–1	3–1
3	(Sweden) AIK	6	1	3	2	10	14	−4	5	2–2	2–1	—	1–1
4	(Switzerland) Lausanne-Sport	6	0	4	2	5	11	−6	4	0–0	1–1	2–2	—

Source: mogiel.net
Rules for classification: 1) Points; 2) Goal difference; 3) Goals scored; 4) Head-to-head points; 5) Away goals scored; 6) Draw.

=== Group B4 ===
Pos	Team	Pld	W	D	L	GF	GA	GD	Pts
1	(Sweden) Öster	6	4	0	2	16	8	+8	8
2	(West Germany) Werder Bremen	6	2	4	0	11	9	+2	8
3	(Belgium) Beveren-Waas	6	1	3	2	9	11	−2	5
4	(Austria) LASK	6	0	3	3	10	18	−8	3

=== Group B5 ===
Pos	Team	Pld	W	D	L	GF	GA	GD	Pts	WIS	HVI	UTR	WIN
1	(Poland) Wisła Kraków	6	5	0	1	11	3	+8	10	—	1–0	1–0	5–1
2	(Denmark) Hvidovre	6	3	1	2	11	6	+5	7	0–1	—	2–1	5–1
3	(Netherlands) Utrecht	6	3	0	3	12	10	+2	6	1–0	1–3	—	4–3
4	(Switzerland) Winterthur	6	0	1	5	8	23	−15	1	1–3	1–1	1–5	—

Source: mogiel.net
Rules for classification: 1) Points; 2) Goal difference; 3) Goals scored; 4) Head-to-head points; 5) Away goals scored; 6) Draw.

=== Group B6 ===
Pos	Team	Pld	W	D	L	GF	GA	GD	Pts
1	Austria Salzburg	6	3	1	2	11	6	+5	7
2	(West Germany) Kaiserslautern	6	3	1	2	7	3	+4	7
3	(Czechoslovakia) Tatran Prešov	6	3	1	2	5	7	−2	7
4	(Denmark) KB	6	1	1	4	4	11	−7	3

=== Group B7 ===
Pos	Team	Pld	W	D	L	GF	GA	GD	Pts
1	(Czechoslovakia) Baník Ostrava	6	5	1	0	10	2	+8	11
2	(Poland) Gwardia Warsaw	6	3	2	1	17	5	+12	8
3	(Austria) Swarovski Wattens	6	2	0	4	9	15	−6	4
4	(Denmark) AaB	6	0	1	5	7	21	−14	1

=== Group B8 ===
Pos	Team	Pld	W	D	L	GF	GA	GD	Pts
1	(Poland) Polonia Bytom	6	3	3	0	11	8	+3	9
2	(Austria) Wacker Innsbruck	6	3	1	2	14	6	+8	7
3	(West Germany) Rot-Weiss Essen	6	2	1	3	16	12	+4	5
4	(Denmark) Horsens	6	0	3	3	3	18	−15	3

== See also ==
- 1970–71 European Cup
- 1970–71 UEFA Cup Winners' Cup
- 1970–71 Inter-Cities Fairs Cup
