= 1971 Intertoto Cup =

UEFA Intertoto football competition held in 1971

In the 1971 Intertoto Cup no knock-out rounds were contested, and therefore no winner was declared.

== Group stage ==
Teams from seven countries (West Germany, Sweden, Switzerland, Poland, Czechoslovakia, Austria, and Denmark) participated: four teams from each country. Denmark was the only country that failed to win a group, while West German clubs won two.

=== Group 1 ===
Pos	Team	Pld	W	D	L	GF	GA	GD	Pts	HER	ZÜR	TRE	AB
1	(West Germany) Hertha Berlin	6	5	0	1	16	7	+9	10	—	3–2	2–1	4–0
2	(Switzerland) Zürich	6	4	1	1	13	8	+5	9	3–2	—	1–0	2–1
3	(Czechoslovakia) Jednota Trenčín	6	2	1	3	9	7	+2	5	0–2	1–1	—	4–0
4	(Denmark) AB	6	0	0	6	4	20	−16	0	1–3	1–4	1–3	—

Source: mogiel.net
Rules for classification: 1) Points; 2) Goal difference; 3) Goals scored; 4) Head-to-head points; 5) Away goals scored; 6) Draw.

4 July 1971
Round 1

Zürich (Switzerland)	2–1	(Denmark) Akademisk Boldklub
Jeandupeux 73' (1:1); Künzli 74' (2:1)	FCZ summary	57' (0:1) Hansen

Kleine Allmend, Frauenfeld
Attendance: 2,500
Referee: (Switzerland) Walter Hungerbühler (St. Gallen)

11 July 1971
Round 2

Jednota Trenčín (Czechoslovakia)	1–1	(Switzerland) Zürich
Lintner 9' (1:0)	FCZ summary	84' (1:1) Jeandupeux

Bratislava
Attendance: 800
Referee: (Czechoslovakia) Bohumil Smejkal

18 July 1971
Round 3

Zürich (Switzerland)	1–0	(Czechoslovakia) Jednota Trenčín
Künzli 12' (1:0)	FCZ summary

Stadion Kleinfeld, Kriens
Attendance: 1,000
Referee: (Switzerland) Marcel Despland (Yverdon-les-Bains)

25 July 1971
Round 4

Hertha Berlin (West Germany)	3–2	(Switzerland) Zürich
Steffenhagen 52' (1:1); Rumor 61' (2:1); Beer 83' (3:1)	FCZ summary	45' (0:1) Konietzka; 85' (3:2) Martinelli

Berlin
Attendance: 15,000
Referee: (Germany) Beer

1 August 1971
Round 5

Akademisk Boldklub (Denmark)	1–4	(Switzerland) Zürich
Hansen 17' (1:0)	FCZ summary	18' (1:1) Künzli; 44' (1:2) Künzli; 78' (1:3) Konietzka; 84' (1:4) Künzli

Gladsaxe Municipality, in Copenhagen
Attendance: 500

7 August 1971
Round 6

Zürich (Switzerland)	3–2	(West Germany) Hertha Berlin
Künzli 32' (1:2); Jeandupeux 53' (2:2); Kuhn 82' (3:2)	FCZ summary	13' (0:1) Hermandung; 23' (0:2) Horr

Schützenwiese, Winterthur
Attendance: 7,800
Referee: (Switzerland) Müller

=== Group 2 ===
Pos	Team	Pld	W	D	L	GF	GA	GD	Pts
1	(Poland) Stal Mielec	6	6	0	0	15	3	+12	12
2	(Czechoslovakia) Tatran Prešov	6	3	1	2	12	8	+4	7
3	(Sweden) Elfsborg	6	2	0	4	10	11	−1	4
4	(Denmark) Vejle	6	0	1	5	5	20	−15	1

Source: mogiel.net
Rules for classification: 1) Points; 2) Goal difference; 3) Goals scored; 4) Head-to-head points; 5) Away goals scored; 6) Draw.

=== Group 3 ===
Pos	Team	Pld	W	D	L	GF	GA	GD	Pts	SER	SZB	LIN	B03
1	(Switzerland) Servette	6	3	2	1	13	4	+9	8	—	2–0	7–0	0–1
2	(Poland) Szombierki Bytom	6	3	1	2	13	7	+6	7	0–1	—	4–1	3–0
3	(Austria) LASK	6	1	3	2	8	16	−8	5	2–2	2–2	—	0–0
4	(Denmark) B 1903	6	1	2	3	4	11	−7	4	1–1	4–1	1–3	—

Source: mogiel.net
Rules for classification: 1) Points; 2) Goal difference; 3) Goals scored; 4) Head-to-head points; 5) Away goals scored; 6) Draw.

=== Group 4 ===
Pos	Team	Pld	W	D	L	GF	GA	GD	Pts
1	(Czechoslovakia) Třinec	6	5	0	1	16	4	+12	10
2	Austria Wien	6	3	0	3	14	12	+2	6
3	(Denmark) Hvidovre	6	2	1	3	11	16	−5	5
4	(West Germany) Kaiserslautern	6	1	1	4	8	17	−9	3

Source: mogiel.net
Rules for classification: 1) Points; 2) Goal difference; 3) Goals scored; 4) Head-to-head points; 5) Away goals scored; 6) Draw.

=== Group 5 ===
Pos	Team	Pld	W	D	L	GF	GA	GD	Pts
1	(Sweden) Åtvidaberg	6	4	1	1	15	7	+8	9
2	(Poland) ROW Rybnik	6	3	1	2	8	10	−2	7
3	(Austria) SSW Innsbruck	6	2	1	3	11	12	−1	5
4	(West Germany) Borussia Dortmund	6	1	1	4	10	15	−5	3

Source: mogiel.net
Rules for classification: 1) Points; 2) Goal difference; 3) Goals scored; 4) Head-to-head points; 5) Away goals scored; 6) Draw.

=== Group 6 ===
Pos	Team	Pld	W	D	L	GF	GA	GD	Pts	EIN	MAL	ZWA	YB
1	(West Germany) Eintracht Braunschweig	6	5	0	1	10	2	+8	10	—	0–1	1–0	2–0
2	(Sweden) Malmö FF	6	4	0	2	15	8	+7	8	0–1	—	4–0	6–3
3	(Poland) Zagłębie Wałbrzych	6	2	0	4	3	8	−5	4	0–1	2–0	—	1–0
4	(Switzerland) Young Boys	6	1	0	5	8	18	−10	2	1–5	2–4	2–0	—

Source: mogiel.net
Rules for classification: 1) Points; 2) Goal difference; 3) Goals scored; 4) Head-to-head points; 5) Away goals scored; 6) Draw.

=== Group 7 ===
Pos	Team	Pld	W	D	L	GF	GA	GD	Pts	SAL	DJU	BRA	GCZ
1	Austria Salzburg	6	5	1	0	16	3	+13	11	—	1–1	2–0	3–0
2	(Sweden) Djurgården	6	3	1	2	8	8	0	7	0–3	—	2–3	1–0
3	(Czechoslovakia) Inter Bratislava	6	2	0	4	17	16	+1	4	1–4	1–2	—	9–2
4	(Switzerland) Grasshopper Club	6	1	0	5	7	21	−14	2	1–3	0–2	4–3	—

Source: mogiel.net
Rules for classification: 1) Points; 2) Goal difference; 3) Goals scored; 4) Head-to-head points; 5) Away goals scored; 6) Draw.

== See also ==
- 1971–72 European Cup
- 1971–72 UEFA Cup Winners' Cup
- 1971–72 UEFA Cup
