= FC Lausanne-Sport =

Sports club in Switzerland

Lausanne-Sport
- Full name: Football Club Lausanne-Sport
- Nicknames: Les bleu et blanc (The Blue and White)
- Founded: 1896; 130 years ago
- Stadium: Stade de la Tuilière
- Capacity: 12,544
- Owner: Ineos
- President: Leen Heemskerk
- Head coach: Ludovic Magnin
- League: Swiss Super League
- 2025–26: Swiss Super League, 9th of 12
- Website: www.lausanne-sport.ch
Home colours	Away colours	Third colours

Football Club Lausanne-Sport is a Swiss football club based in Lausanne in the canton of Vaud. Founded in 1896, Lausanne Sport compete in the top-tier Swiss Super League after being promoted in the 2022–23 Swiss Challenge League Season.

They play their home games at the 12,544-capacity Stade de la Tuilière. Previously Lausanne Sport had played at the Stade Olympique de la Pontaise, a 15,850 all-seater stadium used for the 1954 FIFA World Cup. They played in Swiss First Division between 1906-1931, 1932–2002, 2011–2014, 2016–2018, 2020–2022 and 2023–present. The team has won seven league titles and the Swiss Cup nine times.

== History ==
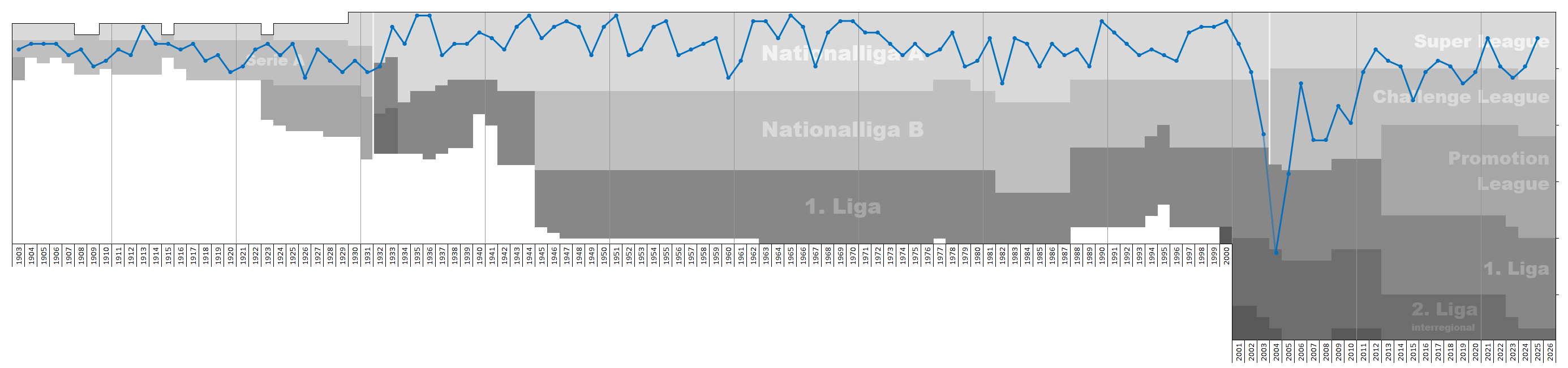
Chart of FC Lausanne-Sport table positions in the Swiss football league system

=== 19th century ===
The club was founded in 1896 under the name of Montriond Lausanne. However, the Lausanne Football and Cricket Club was established in 1860, believed to be the oldest football club on the European continent by some historians.

=== 20th century ===
The club took the name Lausanne-Sports FC in 1920 after the football section merged with the Club Hygiénique de Lausanne, a physical education club. The end of the 1950s and the whole of the 1960s were among the club's finest times. LS won the Swiss Cup twice (1962 and 1964), lost an additional Swiss Cup final to Basel by forfeit, won the Swiss championship (1965) and was runner-up four times (1961, 1962, 1963), as well as in 1969. The year 1965 was the year of the 7th and last Swiss championship title. It was probably the most successful, earning its protagonists the nickname of "Lords of the Night", a reference to some enchanting evenings. Since the advent of the floodlights in the new stadium, the matches have mainly taken place in the evenings which was at the time a unique feature.

=== 21st century ===
After the 2001–02 season, Lausanne-Sports were relegated because the club did not obtain a first level license for the 2002–03 season. Following the 2002–03 season in the second division, Lausanne-Sports FC were again relegated due to bankruptcy. They were reformed as FC Lausanne-Sport for the 2003–04 season and had to begin play at the fourth tier. The team was promoted in consecutive seasons from the fourth division after the 2003–04 season and the third division after the 2004–05 season. After an additional six years in the second tier of Swiss football, the club was promoted to the Super League for the 2011–12 season for a three-season stay before being relegated in 2014. After two seasons in the second tier the team was promoted for a two-season stay in the top division in 2016 and survived relegation in their first season before being relegated back to the second tier again in 2018. Now somewhat of a yo-yo club the team were promoted to the top tier again in 2020.

Lausanne-Sport qualified for the 2010–11 UEFA Europa League after they reached the 2010 Swiss Cup final against Champions League-qualified Basel. In the 2010–11 Europa League, while still playing in the second tier Challenge League, they performed a shock getting to the group stages beating favourites Lokomotiv Moscow on the way.

Lausanne-Sport were relegated to the Swiss Challenge League at the end of the 2013–14 Swiss Super League season. Two years later, they finished first in the 2015–16 Swiss Challenge League, which promoted them back to the top tier of Swiss football for the 2016–17 season.

On 13 November 2017, the club was acquired by Ineos, a Swiss-based British petrochemicals company owned by Jim Ratcliffe, the nation's wealthiest person. The first transfer under the new ownership was that of Enzo Zidane, son of Zinedine Zidane. However, the season ended with relegation. Ratcliffe's brother Bob became club president in March 2019. The club won promotion back to the top flight as champions of the 2019–20 Swiss Challenge League. On 27 May 2023, Lausanne-Sport secure promotion to Super League from 2023 to 2024 after draw 2–2 against FC Aarau, finished in runner-up and return to top tier after one-year absence.

In the 2024–25 season, Lausanne-Sport secured a 5th place finish and qualified to the Conference League for the first time in their history.

The next season, they reached the knockout Play-Off phase, but were knocked out on aggregate 2-3 to Czechia's SK Sigma Olomouc.

== Stadium ==
Lausanne Sport has been playing in their new stadium, the Stade de la Tuiliere, since November 2020. Previously, they played at the stadium Stade Olympique Pontaise.

== Honours ==
=== League ===
- Ligue Nationale A/Super League
  - Winners (7): 1912–13, 1931–32, 1934–35, 1935–36, 1943–44, 1950–51, 1964–65
  - Runners-up (8): 1946–47, 1954–55, 1961–62, 1962–63, 1968–69, 1969–70, 1989–90, 1999–2000
- Ligue Nationale B/Challenge League
  - Winners (4): 1931–32, 2010–11, 2015–16, 2019–20
  - Runners-up (1): 2022–23
- 1. Liga Promotion
  - Winners: 2004–05
- 1. Liga Classic
  - Winners: 2003–04

=== Cups ===
- Swiss Cup
  - Winners (9): 1934–35, 1938–39, 1943–44, 1949–50, 1961–62, 1963–64, 1980–81, 1997–98, 1998–99
  - Runners-up (8): 1936–37, 1945–46, 1946–47, 1956–57, 1966–67, 1983–84, 1999–2000, 2009–10
- Swiss League Cup
  - Runners-up: 1980–81

== Players ==
=== Current squad ===
As of 24 September 2026

Note: Flags indicate national team as defined under FIFA eligibility rules; some limited exceptions apply. Players may hold more than one non-FIFA nationality.

No.	Pos.	Nation	Player
1	GK	SUI	Thomas Castella (vice-captain)
2	DF	FRA	Brandon Soppy
3	DF	ENG	Tyler Fredricson
4	DF	FRA	Étienne Youté Kinkoué
5	DF	SUI	Dircssi Ngonzo
6	DF	SWE	Theo Bergvall
7	FW	KOS	Alban Ajdini
9	FW	FRA	Enzo Molebe (on loan from Lyon)
10	MF	SUI	Olivier Custodio (captain)
11	FW	ENG	Nathan Butler-Oyedeji
16	MF	SUI	Nicky Beloko
17	FW	CIV	Seydou Traoré
18	DF	CGO	Morgan Poaty
20	DF	COM	Hamza Abdallah

No.	Pos.	Nation	Player
22	DF	FRA	Thomas Cordier
27	MF	MTN	Beyatt Lekweiry
31	DF	FRA	Nicolas Cozza
47	MF	SEN	Souleymane N'Diaye
51	FW	SUI	Ibrahim Bah Mendes
54	DF	FIN	Rodolfo Lippo
61	GK	SUI	Emilien Grosso
71	DF	SUI	Karim Sow
77	FW	CIV	Levy Nene (on loan from Nordsjælland)
78	FW	ESP	Omar Janneh
80	MF	MLI	Sékou Koné (on loan from Manchester United)
88	MF	FRA	Koba Koindredi
90	GK	ALG	Melvin Mastil
91	MF	FRA	Florent Mollet

=== Out on loan ===
Note: Flags indicate national team as defined under FIFA eligibility rules; some limited exceptions apply. Players may hold more than one non-FIFA nationality.

No.	Pos.	Nation	Player
—	DF	SUI	Kilyan Vieira Correia (at Grand-Saconnex until 30 June 2027)
—	MF	SUI	Fabulus Ahuissou (at Nyon until 30 June 2027)
—	MF	SUI	Ethan Bruchez (at Yverdon-Sport until 30 June 2027)

No.	Pos.	Nation	Player
—	MF	SUI	Fabio Ferreira (at Portalban/Gletterens until 30 June 2027)
—	FW	SUI	Darko Lötscher (at Bavois until 30 June 2027)

== Coaching staff ==
Position	Staff
Head Coach	(Slovenia) Luka Elsner
Assistant Coaches	(Switzerland) Bénigne Collier
First-Team Coach	(Switzerland) François Lejoly
Goalkeeper Coach	(Switzerland) Alain Pouille

== Former coaches ==
- (Scotland) Billy Hunter (1922–23)
- (England) Jimmy Hogan (1925)
- (England) Fred Spiksley (1928)
- (Switzerland) Robert Pache (1931–32)
- (England) Jimmy Hogan (1933–34)
- (Germany) Alwin Riemke (1934–35)
- (Austria) Friedrich Kerr (1939)
- (Switzerland) Frank Séchehaye (1942–43)
- (Switzerland) Fritz Leonhardt and (Switzerland) Georg Baumgartner (1943–45)
- (Switzerland) Louis Maurer (1945–50)
- (Hungary) Béla Volentik (1950–51)
- (Switzerland) Jacques Spagnoli (1951–53)
- (Switzerland) Joseph Schaefer (1953–54)
- (Netherlands) Bram Appel (1954–55)
- (Switzerland) Fernand Jaccard (1955–57)
- (Austria) Walter Presch (1957–60)
- (Switzerland) Albert Châtelain (1960–61)
- (Switzerland) Charles Marmier and (Switzerland) Frank Séchehaye (1961–62)
- (France) Jean Luciano (1962–64)
- (Switzerland) Roger Reymond and (Switzerland) Roger Bocquet (1964)
- (Switzerland) Roger Reymond (1964–65)
- (West Germany) Kurt Linder (1965–66)
- (Austria) Wilhelm Hahnemann (1966–67)
- (Switzerland) Roger Vonlanthen (1967–72)
- (Switzerland) Louis Maurer (1972–74)
- (Switzerland) Paul Garbani (1974–76)
- (Socialist Federal Republic of Yugoslavia) Miroslav Blažević (1976–79)
- (Switzerland) Charly Hertig (1979–82)
- (Hungary) Péter Pázmándy (1982–84)
- (Romania) Radu Nunweiller (1984–87)
- (Switzerland) Umberto Barberis (1 August 1987 – 20 June 1993)
- (Switzerland) Marc Duvillard (1993–94)
- (Switzerland) Martin Trümpler (1 July 1994 – 30 June 1995)
- (Switzerland) Georges Bregy (1 July 1995 – 30 September 1997)
- (Romania) Radu Nunweiller and (Switzerland) Pierre-André Schürmann (1998)
- (Switzerland) Pierre-André Schürmann (24 October 1998 – 11 December 2000)
- (France) Victor Zvunka (1 July 2000 – 30 June 2001)
- (Romania) Radu Nunweiller (1 July 2001 – 5 December 2001)
- (Switzerland) Umberto Barberis (20 February 2002 – 8 May 2002)
- (Spain) Pablo Iglesias (2002–03)
- (Argentina) Gabriel Calderón (1 January 2003 – 30 June 2003)
- (Germany) Jochen Dries (2003–04)
- (Switzerland) Gérard Castella (1 July 2005 – 24 May 2006)
- (Switzerland) Alain Geiger (1 June 2006 – 21 November 2006)
- (Switzerland) Paul Garbani and (Switzerland) P. Isabella (interim) (24 November 2006 – 11 December 2006)
- (Switzerland) Stéphane Hunziker and (Switzerland) Patrick Isabella (17 February 2007 – 30 May 2007)
- (Switzerland) Umberto Barberis (1 July 2007 – 17 December 2007)
- (Switzerland) Thierry Cotting (15 December 2007 – 30 June 2009)
- (Switzerland) John Dragani (1 July 2008 – 30 June 2010)
- (Switzerland) Árpád Soós (19 March 2010 – 30 June 2010)
- (Switzerland) Martin Rueda (1 July 2010 – 30 June 2012)
- (France) Laurent Roussey (1 July 2012 – 21 October 2013)
- (Switzerland) Alexandre Comisetti (22 October 2013 – 7 November 2013)
- (France) Henri Atamaniuk (8 November 2013 – 20 June 2014)
- (Italy) Francesco Gabriele (1 July 2014 – 9 October 2014)
- (Italy) Marco Simone (13 October 2014 – 24 March 2015)
- (Switzerland) Fabio Celestini (24 March 2015 – 2018)
- (Switzerland) Giorgio Contini (2018 - 9 June 2021)
- (Serbia) Ilija Borenović (10 June 2021 - 4 February 2022)

== Recent seasons ==
Recent season-by-season performance of the club:

Season	Division	Tier	Position
2005–06	Challenge League	II	3rd
2006–07	Challenge League	II	13th
2007–08	Challenge League	II	13th
2008–09	Challenge League	II	7th
2009–10	Challenge League	II	10th
2010–11	Challenge League	II	1st ↑
2011–12	Super League	I	7th
2012–13	Super League	I	9th
2013–14	Super League	I	10th ↓
2014–15	Challenge League	II	5th
2015–16	Challenge League	II	1st ↑
2016–17	Super League	I	9th
2017–18	Super League	I	10th ↓
2018–19	Challenge League	II	3rd
2019–20	Challenge League	II	1st
2020–21	Super League	I	6th
2021–22	Super League	I	10th ↓
2022–23	Challenge League	II	2nd ↑
2023–24	Super League	I	10th
2024–25	Super League	I	5th
2025–26	Super League	I	9th

Key

↑ Promoted	↓ Relegated

== Lausanne-Sports Rowing ==
Lausanne-Sports Aviron is the rowing club of Lausanne-Sport.
