= 1967–68 in Swiss football =

Football in Switzerland
- Season: 1967–68

Men's football
- Nationalliga A: Zürich
- Nationalliga B: Winterthur
- 1. Liga: 1. Liga champions: Etoile Carouge; Group West: Etoile Carouge; Group Cenral: FC Porrentruy; Group South and East: Mendrisiostar
- Swiss Cup: Lugano

The following is a summary of the 1967–68 season of competitive football in Switzerland.

== Nationalliga A ==
=== Final league table ===
Pos	Team	Pld	W	D	L	GF	GA	GD	Pts	Qualification
1	Zürich	26	16	6	4	63	27	+36	38	To championship play-off
2	Grasshopper Club	26	17	4	5	54	23	+31	38	To championship play-off
3	Lugano	26	17	4	5	53	30	+23	38	To championship play-off
4	Lausanne-Sport	26	13	6	7	67	43	+24	32	Entered 1968 Intertoto Cup
5	Basel	26	13	5	8	49	33	+16	31	
6	Luzern	26	12	4	10	51	58	−7	28	
7	Biel-Bienne	26	10	5	11	43	45	−2	25	Entered 1968 Intertoto Cup
8	Young Boys	26	9	7	10	37	43	−6	25	
9	Sion	26	7	10	9	31	41	−10	24	
10	La Chaux-de-Fonds	26	8	6	12	40	49	−9	22	Entered 1968 Intertoto Cup
11	Servette	26	8	5	13	40	42	−2	21	
12	Bellinzona	26	8	5	13	26	40	−14	21	Entered 1968 Intertoto Cup
13	Young Fellows Zürich	26	3	6	17	21	58	−37	12	Relegated to Nationalliga B
14	Grenchen	26	3	3	20	19	62	−43	9	Relegated to Nationalliga B

Source: rsssf.com
Rules for classification: 1) Points; 2) Goal difference within the league, however with play-off for qualifiers;

=== Championship play-off ===
Three teams finished level on points, therefore a play-off was required. The game GC-Zürich was played on 12 June in Bern, Lugano-GC 19 June in Lausanne and Zürich-Lugano in Zürich with the acceptation of Lugano. Before this final match it was already clear that FCZ were Swiss champions, as a win for Lugano would have left all three play-off finalists equal on the same number of points. In this case the goal difference from the regular championship was decisive. The match was therefore moved from Lausanne to Zurich. After the match, the trophy was presented by Federal Councillor Nello Celio under difficult conditions following a pitch invasion by fans.

Pos	Team	Pld	W	D	L	GF	GA	GD	Pts	Qualification	FCZ	GC	LUG
1	FC Zürich	2	2	0	0	4	0	+4	4	Swiss Champions, qualified for 1968–69 European Cup	—	—	2–0
2	Grasshopper Club	2	1	0	1	2	3	−1	2		0–2	—	—–
3	Lugano	2	0	0	2	1	4	−3	0	Swiss Cup winners, qualified for 1968–69 Cup Winners' Cup and entered 1968 Intertoto Cup	—	1–2	—

Source: mogiel.net
Rules for classification: 1) Points; 2) Goal difference regular season.

== Nationalliga B ==
=== Final league table ===
Pos	Team	Pld	W	D	L	GF	GA	GD	Pts	Qualification or relegation
1	FC Winterthur	26	18	4	4	70	27	+43	40	NLB Champions and promoted to 1968–69 Nationalliga A
2	FC St. Gallen	26	12	9	5	61	34	+27	33	Promoted to 1968–69 Nationalliga A
3	FC Aarau	26	11	9	6	50	26	+24	31	
4	FC Xamax	26	12	6	8	52	43	+9	30	
5	FC Chiasso	26	11	7	8	33	29	+4	29	
6	FC Wettingen	26	10	8	8	51	47	+4	28	
7	SC Brühl	26	11	6	9	46	44	+2	28	
8	FC Thun	26	9	9	8	40	37	+3	27	
9	Urania Genève Sport	26	10	7	9	46	47	−1	27	
10	FC Solothurn	26	8	7	11	44	52	−8	23	
11	FC Fribourg	26	6	9	11	35	36	−1	21	
12	FC Baden	26	7	7	12	27	56	−29	21	
13	FC Moutier	26	6	4	16	38	74	−36	16	Relegated to 1968–69 1. Liga
14	FC Bern	26	3	4	19	34	75	−41	10	Relegated to 1968–69 1. Liga

Source: rsssf.com
Rules for classification: 1) Points; 2) Goal difference within the league, however with play-off for qualifiers;

== 1. Liga ==
=== Group West ===
Pos	Team	Pld	W	D	L	GF	GA	GD	Pts	Qualification or relegation
1	Etoile Carouge FC	24	16	5	3	61	25	+36	37	Play-off to Nationalliga B
2	FC Le Locle	24	15	5	4	59	34	+25	35	Play-off to Nationalliga B
3	FC Monthey	24	15	4	5	49	25	+24	34	
4	FC Cantonal Neuchâtel	24	10	7	7	39	37	+2	27	
5	Vevey-Sports	24	11	4	9	36	31	+5	26	
6	Yverdon-Sport FC	24	10	6	8	38	34	+4	26	
7	CS Chênois	24	9	5	10	42	49	−7	23	
8	FC Fontainemelon	24	4	11	9	31	51	−20	19	
9	FC Martigny-Sports	24	6	6	12	42	53	−11	18	
10	US Campagnes GE	24	7	4	13	33	49	−16	18	
11	FC Raron	24	6	5	13	37	46	−9	17	Play-out against relegation
12	FC Versoix	24	6	5	13	24	39	−15	17	Play-out against relegation
13	FC Stade Lausanne	24	3	11	10	26	44	−18	17	Play-out against relegation

Source: RSSSF
Rules for classification: 1) Points; 2) Goal difference within the league, but decider play-off for qualifiers.

==== Relegation play-out ====
Team 1	Score	Team 2
FC Stade Lausanne	4–2	FC Raron
FC Versoix	1–2	FC Stade Lausanne
FC Raron	n/p	FC Versoix

FC Stade Lausanne won both matches and remain in the division. The match Raron-Versoix was not played. Both teams were relegated to 2. Liga Interregional.

=== Group Central ===
Pos	Team	Pld	W	D	L	GF	GA	GD	Pts	Qualification or relegation
1	FC Porrentruy	24	17	5	2	57	15	+42	39	Play-off to Nationalliga B
2	FC Emmenbrücke	24	15	3	6	53	25	+28	33	Play-off to Nationalliga B
3	FC Minerva Bern	24	12	7	5	48	27	+21	31	
4	FC Dürrenast	24	11	6	7	43	31	+12	28	
5	FC Langenthal	24	10	6	8	51	51	0	26	
6	FC Concordia Basel	24	12	1	11	62	46	+16	25	
7	FC Breitenbach	24	8	8	8	43	33	+10	24	
8	SC Burgdorf	24	8	7	9	36	34	+2	23	
9	SC Zofingen	24	8	5	11	38	36	+2	21	
10	FC Nordstern Basel	24	8	4	12	43	44	−1	20	Play-out against relegation
11	BSC Old Boys	24	7	6	11	35	46	−11	20	Play-out against relegation
12	FC Alle	24	8	4	12	31	63	−32	20	Play-out against relegation
13	ASEP Saint-Imier	24	1	0	23	19	108	−89	2	Relegation to 2. Liga Interregional

Source: RSSSF
Rules for classification: 1) Points; 2) Goal difference within the league, but decider play-off for qualifiers.

==== Relegation play-out ====
Team 1	Score	Team 2
FC Alle	1–1	FC Nordstern Basel
BSC Old Boys	1–0	FC Alle
FC Nordstern Basel	0–0	BSC Old Boys

FC Alle are relegated to 2. Liga Interregional. BSC Old Boys and FC Nordstern Basel remain in the division.

=== Group South and East ===
Pos	Team	Pld	W	D	L	GF	GA	GD	Pts	Qualification or relegation
1	Mendrisiostar	24	17	5	2	50	20	+30	39	Play-off to Nationalliga B
2	FC Frauenfeld	24	13	8	3	57	27	+30	34	Play-off to Nationalliga B
3	FC Vaduz	24	12	4	8	41	33	+8	28	
4	FC Locarno	24	9	10	5	40	35	+5	28	
5	FC Küsnacht	24	9	7	8	32	37	−5	25	
6	FC Schaffhausen	24	9	7	8	41	36	+5	25	
7	FC Red Star Zürich	24	6	10	8	37	38	−1	22	
8	SC Zug	24	7	8	9	30	33	−3	22	
9	FC Uster	24	7	8	9	22	30	−8	22	
10	FC Amriswil	24	5	10	9	32	39	−7	20	
11	FC Blue Stars Zürich	24	7	6	11	31	40	−9	20	
12	FC Widnau	24	4	7	13	28	44	−16	15	Relegation to 2. Liga Interregional
13	FC Brunnen	24	3	6	15	21	50	−29	12	Relegation to 2. Liga Interregional

Source: RSSSF
Rules for classification: 1) Points; 2) Goal difference within the league, but decider play-off for qualifiers.

=== Promotion play-off ===
The three group winners played a two legged tie against one of the runners-up to decide the three finalists. The games were played on 2 and 9 June 1968.

==== Qualification round ====
Team 1	Score	Team 2
FC Porrentruy	3–1	FC Frauenfeld
FC Frauenfeld	1–1	FC Porrentruy

FC Porrentruy win 4–2 on aggregate and continue to the finals.

Team 1	Score	Team 2
Etoile Carouge FC	0–0	FC Emmenbrücke
FC Emmenbrücke	1–1	Etoile Carouge FC

Etoile Carouge FC are qualified as best classed in the regular season, FC Emmenbrücke is eliminated.

Team 1	Score	Team 2
Mendrisiostar	3–0	FC Le Locle
FC Le Locle	3–0	Mendrisiostar

Mendrisiostar and Le Locle-Sports are qualified as best classed in the regular season, FC Emmenbrücke is eliminated..

==== Final round ====
The games were played on 16 and 23 June 1968.

Team 1	Score	Team 2
FC Le Locle	1–2	Etoile Carouge FC
Etoile Carouge FC	1–1	FC Le Locle

Etoile Carouge FC won 3–2 on aggregate and are promoted to 1968–69 Nationalliga B..

These games were played on 23 and 30 June 1968.

Team 1	Score	Team 2
Mendrisiostar	2–0	FC Porrentruy
FC Porrentruy	1–2	Mendrisiostar

Mendrisiostar won 4–1 on aggregate, are declaired 1. Liga champions and are promoted to 1968–69 Nationalliga B.

== Swiss Cup ==
The competition was played in a knockout system. In the case of a draw, extra time was played. If the teams were still level after extra time, the match was replayed at the away team's ground. Here, in case of a draw after extra time, the replay was to be decided with a penalty shoot-out.

=== Early rounds ===
The routes of the finalists to the final were:

- Second round: teams from the NLA and NLB with byes.
- Third round: teams from the NLA with a bye. Winterthur-Vaduz 10:1.
- Fourth round: Aarau-Lugano 2:2 (a.e.t.), Replay: Lugano-Aarau 3:1. Winterthur-Amriswil 3:0.
- Fifth round: St. Gallen-Lugano 1:2. Xamax-Winterthur 4:5 (a.e.t.).
- Quarter-finals. Lugano-Zürich 1:0. Winterthur-Young Fellows 2:1.
- Semi-finals: Luzern-Lugano 2:4 (a.e.t.). Winterthur-Biel 2:1.

=== Final ===
The final was held at the Wankdorf Stadium in Bern on Whit Monday 1969.

15 April 1968

Lugano	2–1	Winterthur
Luttrop 11'; Simonetti 77'	Fussball Schweiz	46' Dimmeler

Wankdorf Stadium, Bern
Attendance: 34,000
Referee: (Switzerland) Mario Clematide, (Zollikofen)

== Swiss Clubs in Europe ==
- Basel as 1966–67 Nationalliga A champions: 1967–68 European Cup
- Lausanne-Sport as 1966–67 Swiss Cup runner-up: 1967–68 Cup Winners' Cup and entered 1967 Intertoto Cup
- Lugano: Entered 1967 Intertoto Cup
- Grasshopper Club: Entered 1967 Intertoto Cup
- Sion: Entered 1967 Intertoto Cup
- Young Boys: Entered 1967 Intertoto Cup
- Grenchen: Entered 1967 Intertoto Cup
- Young Fellows: Entered 1967 Intertoto Cup

=== Basel ===
==== European Cup ====
===== First round =====
20 September 1967 First leg	Basel (Switzerland)	1 – 2	(Denmark) Hvidovre	St. Jakob Stadium, Basel
20:00	Hauser 17' (1:0)	Report; FCB Summary	58' (1:1) Larsen; 80' (1:2) Sørensen	Attendance: 13,344; Referee: Gyula Emsberger (Hungary)

18 October 1967 Second leg	Hvidovre (Denmark)	3 – 3	(Switzerland) Basel	Idrætsparken, Copenhagen
19:00	Hansen 18'; Sørensen 39'; Olsen 58'	Report; FCB Summary	2' Hauser; (yellow card) 63' Benthaus; 78' Benthaus; 85' Wenger	Attendance: 9,363; Referee: Ken Dagnall (England)

Hvidovre won 5–4 on aggregate.

=== Lausanne ===
==== Cup Winners' Cup ====
===== First round =====
Team 1	Agg.	Team 2	1st leg	2nd leg
Lausanne Sports (Switzerland)	3–4	(Czechoslovakia) Spartak Trnava	3–2	0–2

==== Intertoto Cup ====
===== Group A2 =====
Pos	Team	Pld	W	D	L	GF	GA	GD	Pts	FEY	RDC	STR	LS
1	(Netherlands) Feyenoord	6	5	0	1	17	6	+11	10	—	5–1	3–0	2–1
2	(Belgium) RDC Molenbeek	6	3	1	2	8	9	−1	7	1–0	—	0–0	1–0
3	(France) Strasbourg	6	1	2	3	6	11	−5	4	1–3	3–1	—	0–2
4	(Switzerland) Lausanne-Sports	6	1	1	4	8	13	−5	3	2–4	1–4	2–2	—

Source: mogiel.net
Rules for classification: 1) Points; 2) Goal difference; 3) Goals scored; 4) Head-to-head points; 5) Away goals scored; 6) Draw.

=== Lugano ===
==== Intertoto Cup ====
===== Group A1 =====
Pos	Team	Pld	W	D	L	GF	GA	GD	Pts	LUG	BOR	SPA	WAR
1	(Switzerland) Lugano	6	3	1	2	8	5	+3	7	—	0–0	2–0	2–1
2	(France) Bordeaux	6	3	1	2	5	7	−2	7	2–1	—	1–4	0–2
3	(Netherlands) Sparta Rotterdam	6	3	0	3	9	6	+3	6	1–0	0–1	—	4–0
4	(Belgium) Waregem	6	2	0	4	6	10	−4	4	1–3	0–1	2–0	—

Source: mogiel.net
Rules for classification: 1) Points; 2) Goal difference; 3) Goals scored; 4) Head-to-head points; 5) Away goals scored; 6) Draw.

=== Grasshopper Club ===
==== Intertoto Cup ====
===== Group B3 =====
Pos	Team	Pld	W	D	L	GF	GA	GD	Pts	BYT	BRE	ELF	GCZ
1	(Poland) Polonia Bytom	6	5	0	1	16	6	+10	10	—	2–1	3–0	5–1
2	(West Germany) Werder Bremen	6	3	2	1	12	7	+5	8	2–0	—	4–1	1–1
3	(Sweden) Elfsborg	6	1	1	4	10	16	−6	3	1–2	2–2	—	5–2
4	(Switzerland) Grasshopper Club	6	1	1	4	9	18	−9	3	1–4	1–2	3–1	—

Source: mogiel.net
Rules for classification: 1) Points; 2) Goal difference; 3) Goals scored; 4) Head-to-head points; 5) Away goals scored; 6) Draw.

=== Sion ===
==== Intertoto Cup ====
===== Group A3 =====
Pos	Team	Pld	W	D	L	GF	GA	GD	Pts	LIL	SIO	BEE	GRO
1	(France) Lille	6	3	2	1	10	6	+4	8	—	0–0	0–1	2–1
2	(Switzerland) Sion	6	3	1	2	10	7	+3	7	1–3	—	5–2	3–1
3	(Belgium) Beerschot	6	1	3	2	6	9	−3	5	2–2	0–1	—	1–1
4	(Netherlands) Groningen	6	1	2	3	5	9	−4	4	1–3	1–0	0–0	—

Source: mogiel.net
Rules for classification: 1) Points; 2) Goal difference; 3) Goals scored; 4) Head-to-head points; 5) Away goals scored; 6) Draw.

=== Young Boys ===
==== Intertoto Cup ====
===== Group B5 =====
Pos	Team	Pld	W	D	L	GF	GA	GD	Pts	RUC	FRE	YB	FIR
1	(Poland) Ruch Chorzów	6	6	0	0	18	6	+12	12	—	5–1	4–3	2–0
2	(Denmark) Frem	6	2	1	3	11	11	0	5	1–2	—	4–1	4–1
3	(Switzerland) Young Boys	6	1	2	3	8	12	−4	4	0–2	0–0	—	2–0
4	(Austria) First Vienna	6	1	1	4	6	14	−8	3	1–3	2–1	2–2	—

Source: mogiel.net
Rules for classification: 1) Points; 2) Goal difference; 3) Goals scored; 4) Head-to-head points; 5) Away goals scored; 6) Draw.

=== Grenchen ===
==== Intertoto Cup ====
===== Group A4 =====
Pos	Team	Pld	W	D	L	GF	GA	GD	Pts	LIE	GRE	ROU	GAE
1	(Belgium) Lierse	6	4	1	1	13	7	+6	9	—	3–1	1–1	2–0
2	(Switzerland) Grenchen	6	2	2	2	8	9	−1	6	2–1	—	1–1	2–0
3	(France) Rouen	6	1	3	2	9	15	−6	5	2–4	1–1	—	4–3
4	(Netherlands) Go Ahead Eagles	6	2	0	4	12	11	+1	4	1–2	3–1	5–0	—

Source: mogiel.net
Rules for classification: 1) Points; 2) Goal difference; 3) Goals scored; 4) Head-to-head points; 5) Away goals scored; 6) Draw.

=== Young Fellows ===
==== Intertoto Cup ====
===== Group B4 =====
Pos	Team	Pld	W	D	L	GF	GA	GD	Pts	GÖT	JEN	B05	YFZ
1	(Sweden) Gothenburg	6	4	1	1	16	7	+9	9	—	4–0	2–1	2–2
2	(East Germany) FC Carl Zeiss Jena	6	4	1	1	10	9	+1	9	3–1	—	1–0	3–2
3	(Czechoslovakia) Bohemians Prague	6	2	1	3	12	8	+4	5	1–3	1–1	—	4–0
4	(Switzerland) Young Fellows Zürich	6	0	1	5	6	20	−14	1	0–4	1–2	1–5	—

Source: mogiel.net
Rules for classification: 1) Points; 2) Goal difference; 3) Goals scored; 4) Head-to-head points; 5) Away goals scored; 6) Draw.

== Sources ==
- Switzerland 1967–68 at RSSSF
- European Competitions 1967–68 at RSSSF.com
- Cup finals at Fussball-Schweiz
- Intertoto history at Pawel Mogielnicki's Page
- Josef Zindel (2018). FC Basel 1893. Die ersten 125 Jahre (in German). Basel: Friedrich Reinhardt Verlag. ISBN 978-3-7245-2305-5.

Preceded by 1966–67	Seasons in Swiss football	Succeeded by 1968–69
