= 1968–69 in Swiss football =

Football in Switzerland
- Season: 1968–69

Men's football
- Nationalliga A: Basel
- Nationalliga B: FC Wettingen
- 1. Liga: 1. Liga champions: FC Martigny-Sports; Group West: FC Martigny-Sports; Group Cenral: FC Langenthal; Group South and East: FC Frauenfeld
- Swiss Cup: St. Gallen

The following is a summary of the 1968–69 season of competitive football in Switzerland.

== Nationalliga A ==
=== Final league table ===
Pos	Team	Pld	W	D	L	GF	GA	GD	Pts	Qualification
1	Basel (C)	26	13	10	3	48	28	+20	36	Swiss Champions, qualified for 1969–70 European Cup
2	Lausanne-Sport	26	15	5	6	70	43	+27	35	
3	Zürich	26	12	6	8	61	37	+24	30	
4	Young Boys	26	12	6	8	49	36	+13	30	Entered 1969 Intertoto Cup
5	Lugano	26	11	7	8	37	26	+11	29	Entered 1969 Intertoto Cup
6	Bellinzona	26	10	8	8	38	41	−3	28	Entered 1969 Intertoto Cup
7	FC Biel-Bienne	26	9	8	9	52	59	−7	26	
8	Servette	26	9	7	10	32	39	−7	25	Entered 1969 Intertoto Cup
9	Grasshopper Club	26	7	9	10	43	47	−4	23	
10	St. Gallen	26	6	11	9	29	37	−8	23	Swiss Cup winners, qualified for 1969–70 Cup Winners' Cup
11	Winterthur	26	5	12	9	28	43	−15	22	
12	La Chaux-de-Fonds	26	5	11	10	51	53	−2	21	Entered 1969 Intertoto Cup
13	Sion	26	7	6	13	39	52	−13	20	Relegated to 1969–70 Nationalliga B
14	Luzern	26	6	4	16	35	71	−36	16	Relegated to 1969–70 Nationalliga B

Source: rsssf.com
Rules for classification: 1) Points; 2) Goal difference within the league, however with play-off for qualifiers;
(C) Champions

== Nationalliga B ==
=== Final league table ===
Pos	Team	Pld	W	D	L	GF	GA	GD	Pts	Qualification or relegation
1	FC Wettingen	26	15	6	5	47	24	+23	36	NLB Champions and promoted to 1969–70 Nationalliga A
2	FC Fribourg	26	12	10	4	43	24	+19	34	Promoted to 1969–70 Nationalliga A
3	SC Brühl	26	10	11	5	50	36	+14	31	
4	FC Xamax	26	12	4	10	42	35	+7	28	
5	FC Chiasso	26	10	8	8	32	38	−6	28	
6	FC Grenchen	26	10	7	9	45	34	+11	27	
7	FC Aarau	26	9	8	9	33	32	+1	26	
8	Young Fellows Zürich	26	8	10	8	31	38	−7	26	
9	Mendrisiostar	26	9	7	10	25	36	−11	25	
10	FC Thun	26	10	3	13	31	31	0	23	
11	Etoile Carouge FC	26	7	9	10	27	33	−6	23	
12	Urania Genève Sport	26	6	9	11	22	34	−12	21	
13	FC Baden	26	6	8	12	19	33	−14	20	Relegated to 1969–70 1. Liga
14	FC Solothurn	26	6	4	16	27	46	−19	16	Relegated to 1969–70 1. Liga

Source: rsssf.com
Rules for classification: 1) Points; 2) Goal difference within the league, however with play-off for qualifiers;

== 1. Liga ==
=== Group West ===
Pos	Team	Pld	W	D	L	GF	GA	GD	Pts	Qualification or relegation
1	FC Martigny-Sports	24	18	2	4	57	25	+32	38	To play-off to Nationalliga B
2	FC Monthey	24	16	5	3	58	24	+34	37	Decider for second position
3	Vevey-Sports	24	16	5	3	49	18	+31	37	Decider for second position
4	FC Cantonal Neuchâtel	24	10	6	8	36	37	−1	26	
5	US Campagnes GE	24	8	8	8	29	30	−1	24	
6	FC Le Locle	24	9	4	11	53	43	+10	22	
7	Yverdon-Sport FC	24	8	5	11	35	38	−3	21	
8	FC Moutier	24	6	7	11	34	49	−15	19	
9	FC Meyrin	24	5	9	10	26	43	−17	19	
10	CS Chênois	24	6	6	12	26	38	−12	18	
11	FC Fontainemelon	24	7	3	14	32	47	−15	17	Play-out against relegation
12	FC Stade Nyonnais	24	8	1	15	26	46	−20	17	Play-out against relegation
13	FC Stade Lausanne	24	7	3	14	35	58	−23	17	Play-out against relegation

Source: RSSSF
Rules for classification: 1) Points; 2) Goal difference within the league, but decider play-off for qualifiers; 3) Goals scored; 4) Head-to-head points; 5) Away goals scored; 6) Draw.

==== Decider for second place ====
The decider match for second place was played on 2 June 1969 in Martigny

Team 1	Score	Team 2
FC Monthey	2–0	Vevey-Sports

FC Monthey won and advanced to play-offs. Vevey-Sports remain in the division.

==== Play-out against relegation ====
Team 1	Score	Team 2
FC Stade Nyonnais	3–0	FC Fontainemelon
FC Stade Lausanne	1–3	FC Stade Nyonnais
FC Fontainemelon	n/p	FC Stade Lausanne

FC Stade Nyonnais won remain in the division. The match Fontainemelon against Lausanne was not played. Both teams were relegated to 2. Liga Interregional.

=== Group Central ===
Pos	Team	Pld	W	D	L	GF	GA	GD	Pts	Qualification or relegation
1	FC Langenthal	24	15	4	5	44	29	+15	34	Play-off to Nationalliga B
2	FC Bern	24	13	5	6	43	30	+13	31	Play-off to Nationalliga B
3	FC Nordstern Basel	24	12	6	6	49	49	0	30	
4	FC Concordia Basel	24	11	5	8	40	39	+1	27	
5	SC Burgdorf	24	10	5	9	44	39	+5	25	
6	FC Minerva Bern	24	9	6	9	36	29	+7	24	
7	FC Breitenbach	24	10	3	11	39	42	−3	23	
8	FC Porrentruy	24	9	4	11	40	31	+9	22	
9	FC Dürrenast	24	10	2	12	39	39	0	22	
10	SC Zofingen	24	9	3	12	38	42	−4	21	
11	FC Breite Basel	24	6	9	9	28	41	−13	21	
12	FC Trimbach	24	6	6	12	24	32	−8	18	Relegation to 2. Liga Interregional
13	BSC Old Boys	24	4	6	14	27	49	−22	14	Relegation to 2. Liga Interregional

Source: RSSSF
Rules for classification: 1) Points; 2) Goal difference within the league, but decider play-off for qualifiers; 3) Goals scored; 4) Head-to-head points; 5) Away goals scored; 6) Draw.

=== Group South and East ===
Pos	Team	Pld	W	D	L	GF	GA	GD	Pts	Qualification or relegation
1	FC Frauenfeld	24	14	5	5	44	27	+17	33	Play-off to Nationalliga B
2	SC Buochs	24	14	4	6	54	30	+24	32	Play-off to Nationalliga B
3	FC Amriswil	24	11	8	5	42	30	+12	30	
4	FC Red Star Zürich	24	11	5	8	32	28	+4	27	
5	FC Locarno	24	12	1	11	41	31	+10	25	
6	FC Küsnacht	24	8	8	8	28	27	+1	24	
7	SC Zug	24	8	8	8	28	30	−2	24	
8	FC Emmenbrücke	24	9	4	11	34	43	−9	22	
9	FC Uster	24	4	13	7	25	29	−4	21	
10	FC Vaduz	24	8	5	11	28	35	−7	21	
11	FC Oerlikon/Polizei ZH	24	9	2	13	37	39	−2	20	
12	FC Blue Stars Zürich	24	5	7	12	23	44	−21	17	Relegation to 2. Liga Interregional
13	FC Schaffhausen	24	4	8	12	26	49	−23	16	Relegation to 2. Liga Interregional

Source: RSSSF
Rules for classification: 1) Points; 2) Goal difference within the league, but decider play-off for qualifiers; 3) Goals scored; 4) Head-to-head points; 5) Away goals scored; 6) Draw.

=== Promotion play-off ===
The three group winners played a two legged tie against one of the runners-up to decide the three finalists. The games were played on 8 and 15 June 1969.

==== Qualification round ====
Team 1	Score	Team 2
FC Martigny-Sports	2–1	SC Buochs
SC Buochs	1–1	FC Martigny-Sports

FC Martigny-Sports won 3–2 on aggregate and continued to the finals.

Team 1	Score	Team 2
FC Langenthal	2–0	FC Monthey
FC Monthey	3–1	FC Langenthal

3–3 on aggregate. Both teams continued to the finals.

Team 1	Score	Team 2
FC Frauenfeld	1–1	FC Bern
FC Bern	0–1	FC Frauenfeld

FC Frauenfeld win 2–1 on aggregate and continued to the finals.

==== Final round ====
The finals were played on 22 and 29 June 1969.

Team 1	Score	Team 2
FC Martigny-Sports	3–0	FC Monthey
FC Monthey	1–0	FC Martigny-Sports

FC Martigny-Sports win 3–1 on aggregate, are declaired as 1. champions and are promoted to 1969–70 Nationalliga B.

Team 1	Score	Team 2
FC Langenthal	4–0	FC Frauenfeld
FC Frauenfeld	3–1	FC Langenthal

FC Langenthal win 5–3 on aggregate and are promoted to 1969–70 Nationalliga B.

== Swiss Cup ==
The competition was played in a knockout system. In the case of a draw, extra time was played. If the teams were still level after extra time, the match was replayed at the away team's ground. Here, in case of a draw after extra time, the replay was to be decided with a penalty shoot-out.

=== Early rounds ===
The routes of the finalists to the final were:

- Third round: teams from the NLA with a bye.
- Fourth round: St. Gallen-Wettingen 3:2. Bellinzona-Buochs 4:1.
- Fifth round: St. Gallen-YB 2:1. Bellinzona-Lausanne 3:2.
- Quarter-finals: Lugano-St. Gallen 0:1 (a.e.t.). Bellinzona-Sion 3:1.
- Semi-finals: St. Gallen-Servette 3:0. Bellinzona-GC 2:1.

=== Final ===
The final was held in the Wankdorf Stadium in Bern on Whit Monday 1969. Although Bellinzona had already been Swiss champions in 1948, neither club held ever won the Swiss Cup title before. St. Gallen had never won a title before and this was their first, both goals were scored by Rudolf Nafziger.

26 May 1969

St. Gallen	2–0	Bellinzona
Nafziger 61', 71'	Fussball Schweiz

Wankdorf Stadium, Bern
Attendance: 24,000
Referee: (Switzerland) Gilbert Droz (Marin-Epagnier)

== Swiss Clubs in Europe ==
- Zürich as 1967–68 Nationalliga A champions: 1968–69 European Cup
- Lugano as 1967–68 Swiss Cup winners: 1968–69 Cup Winners' Cup and entered 1968 Intertoto Cup
- Lausanne-Sport: Entered 1968 Intertoto Cup
- FC Biel-Bienne: Entered 1968 Intertoto Cup
- FC La Chaux-de-Fonds: Entered 1968 Intertoto Cup
- AC Bellinzona: Entered 1968 Intertoto Cup

=== Zürich ===
==== European Cup ====
===== First round =====
18 September 1968 First leg	Zürich (Switzerland)	1–3	(Denmark) AB	Letzigrund, Zürich
	Winiger 50'	Report	Hansen 22'; Wiberg 25'; Petersen 62'	Attendance: 17,000; Referee: Juan Gardeazábal Garay (Spain)

2 October 1968 Second leg	AB (Denmark)	1–2	(Switzerland) Zürich	Københavns Idrætapark, Copenhagen
	Petersen 53'	Report	Künzli 42', 80'	Attendance: 9,557; Referee: Malcolm Wright (Northern Ireland)

AB won 4–3 on aggregate.

=== Lugano ===
==== Cup Winners' Cup ====
===== First round =====
Team 1	Agg.	Team 2	1st leg	2nd leg
Lugano (Switzerland)	0–4	(Spain) Barcelona	0–1	0–3

==== Intertoto Cup ====
===== Group A6 =====
Pos	Team	Pld	W	D	L	GF	GA	GD	Pts	ADO	PAR	LUG
1	(Netherlands) ADO Den Haag	4	3	0	1	6	4	+2	6	—	2–0	2–0
2	(France) RCF Paris	4	2	1	1	5	3	+2	5	3–0	—	2–1
3	(Switzerland) Lugano	4	0	1	3	2	6	−4	1	1–2	0–0	—

Source: mogiel.net
Rules for classification: 1) Points; 2) Goal difference; 3) Goals scored; 4) Head-to-head points; 5) Away goals scored; 6) Draw.

=== Lausanne-Sport ===
==== Intertoto Cup ====
===== Group B7 =====
Pos	Team	Pld	W	D	L	GF	GA	GD	Pts	EIN	LS	TIN	AB
1	(West Germany) Eintracht Braunschweig	6	4	1	1	11	7	+4	9	—	2–1	3–1	2–0
2	(Switzerland) Lausanne-Sport	6	3	1	2	14	10	+4	7	4–2	—	4–1	2–2
3	(Austria) Wacker Innsbruck	6	2	0	4	8	12	−4	4	1–2	3–2	—	0–1
4	(Denmark) AB	6	1	2	3	3	7	−4	4	0–0	0–1	0–2	—

Source: mogiel.net
Rules for classification: 1) Points; 2) Goal difference; 3) Goals scored; 4) Head-to-head points; 5) Away goals scored; 6) Draw.

=== Biel-Bienne ===
==== Intertoto Cup ====
===== Group B1 =====
Pos	Team	Pld	W	D	L	GF	GA	GD	Pts	KMS	LIN	HEL	BIE
1	(East Germany) FC Karl-Marx-Stadt	6	3	2	1	9	4	+5	8	—	1–1	3–0	3–0
2	(Austria) LASK	6	2	3	1	14	10	+4	7	2–0	—	4–1	3–3
3	(Sweden) Helsingborg	6	3	1	2	10	9	+1	7	0–0	2–1	—	3–0
4	(Switzerland) Biel-Bienne	6	0	2	4	8	18	−10	2	1–2	3–3	1–4	—

Source: mogiel.net
Rules for classification: 1) Points; 2) Goal difference; 3) Goals scored; 4) Head-to-head points; 5) Away goals scored; 6) Draw.

=== La Chaux-de-Fonds ===
==== Intertoto Cup ====
===== Group B2 =====
Pos	Team	Pld	W	D	L	GF	GA	GD	Pts	ROS	KAT	ÖRE	CDF
1	(East Germany) Hansa Rostock	6	5	1	0	10	3	+7	11	—	2–0	1–0	3–1
2	(Poland) Katowice	6	3	0	3	4	5	−1	6	0–1	—	1–0	2–1
3	(Sweden) Örebro	6	2	1	3	14	4	+10	5	1–1	0–1	—	9–0
4	(Switzerland) La Chaux-de-Fonds	6	1	0	5	4	20	−16	2	1–2	1–0	0–4	—

Source: mogiel.net
Rules for classification: 1) Points; 2) Goal difference; 3) Goals scored; 4) Head-to-head points; 5) Away goals scored; 6) Draw.

=== Bellinzona ===
==== Intertoto Cup ====
===== Group B8 =====
Pos	Team	Pld	W	D	L	GF	GA	GD	Pts	LEG	HAN	FRE	BEL
1	(Poland) Legia Warsaw	6	4	2	0	16	6	+10	10	—	2–2	4–0	4–0
2	(West Germany) Hannover 96	6	3	2	1	16	7	+9	8	2–3	—	3–0	4–1
3	(Denmark) Frem	6	2	1	3	7	9	−2	5	1–2	0–0	—	2–0
4	(Switzerland) Bellinzona	6	0	1	5	3	20	−17	1	1–1	1–5	0–4	—

Source: mogiel.net
Rules for classification: 1) Points; 2) Goal difference; 3) Goals scored; 4) Head-to-head points; 5) Away goals scored; 6) Draw.

== Sources ==
- Switzerland 1968–69 at RSSSF
- European Competitions 1968–69 at RSSSF.com
- Cup finals at Fussball-Schweiz
- Intertoto history at Pawel Mogielnicki's Page
- Josef Zindel (2018). FC Basel 1893. Die ersten 125 Jahre (in German). Basel: Friedrich Reinhardt Verlag. ISBN 978-3-7245-2305-5.

Preceded by 1967–68	Seasons in Swiss football	Succeeded by 1969–70
