= 1974–75 Swiss Cup =

Tournament details
- Country: Switzerland

Final positions
- Champions: Basel
- Runners-up: Winterthur

The 1974–75 Swiss Cup was the 50th season of Switzerland's annual football cup competition.

== Overview ==
The cup competition began on 16 June 1974, with the first games of the first round, but this round was not completed until 10 August with all the required games. The entire competition was to be completed on Easter Monday 31 March 1975 with the final, which was held at the former Wankdorf Stadium in Bern. The clubs from this season's Nationalliga B (NLB) were granted byes for the first round. These entered the competition for the second round, played on the weekend of 10 and 11 of August. The clubs from this season's Nationalliga A (NLA) were granted byes for the first three rounds. These teams joined the competition in the fourth round, which was played on 21 and 22 September.

The matches were played in a knockout format. In the first two rounds, in the event of a draw at the end of extra time, the match was decided with a penalty shoot-out. In and after the third-round, in the event of a draw at the end of extra time, a replay was foreseen and this was played on the visiting team's pitch. The quarter- and semi-finals were played as two legged fixtures. The final was again played in one match. The winners of the cup qualified themselves for the first round of the Cup Winners' Cup in the next season.

== Round 1 ==
=== Summary ===
Team 1	Score	Team 2
16 June 1974
FC Ayent	3–4	FC Raron
Marin-Sports	1–2	Le Locle-Sports
FC Tafers	2–8	Central Fribourg
FC Boudry	0–1	Bern
FC Bettlach	0–0 (a.e.t.) (p)	Bözingen 34
FC Langenthal	1–4	Solothurn'
FC Laufenburg	3–5	Baden
FC Dietikon	0–2	Blue Stars
FC Albisrieden ZH	4–2	FC Schwammendingen ZH
SV Seebach ZH	6–2	FC Neuhausen
FC Littau	1–5	Kriens
Ibach	0–4	Emmenbrücke
Kickers Luzern	2–8	Buochs
Bodio	0–2	US Giubiasco
FC Wollishofen ZH	1–0	Wohlen
23 June 1974
AS Gambarogno	1–2	Locarno
FC Schattdorf	6–2	FC Brunnen
FC Rüti ZH	1–0	FC Uznach
Bülach	2–1	Schaffhausen
Rapid Ostermundingen	3–3 (a.e.t.) (p)	Dürrenast
FC Lerchenfeld (Thun)	10–1	Minerva Bern
FC Einsielden	2–1	SC Zug
FC Chalais	2–4 (a.e.t.)	Monthey
US Boncourt	1–3	Delémont
FC Rafzerfeld	5–4	Frauenfeld
SC Veltheim Winterthur	3–5	FC Uzwil
Juventus Zürich	6–3	Red Star
FC Collex-Bossy	1–3	Stade Nyonnais
FC Vouvry	5–1	FC Sierre
FC Gurmels	5–2	FC Beauregard Fribourg
Corcelles-Cormondrèche	5–1	FC Portalban
FC Pieterlen	2–1	Moutier
FC Mett	3–5	Lengnau
FC Aesch	2–3	Concordia
FC Liestal	0–5	Laufen
FC Olten	0–3	SC Schöftland
FC Rothrist	2–5	FC Deitingen
FC Selzach	2–2 (a.e.t.) (p)	FC Menziken
FC Weinfelden	5–3	Kreuzlingen
FC Kirchberg SG	4–5	Gossau
FC Rebstein	3–2 (a.e.t.)	Brühl
Balzers	3–2	Chur
FC St.Margrethen	4–1	FC Rorschach
FC Morbio	0–2	FC Rapid Lugano
30 June 1974
Interstar GE	2–4	Meyrin
Signal FC (Bernex)	5–1	Urania Genève Sport
FC Assens	0–1 (a.e.t.)	Bulle
FC Fétigny	2–1	FC Renens
FC Orbe	5–2	FC Moudon
FC Crans-sur-Céligny	2–1 (a.e.t.)	FC Pully
Zähringia BE	5–2	ASI Audax-Friul
Köniz	5–1	Thun
SC Kleinhüningen	5–0	FC Porrentruy
Old Boys	2–2 (a.e.t.) (p)	FC Pratteln
FC Sursee	6–5	FC Brugg
FC Widnau	0–3	FC Altstätten (St. Gallen)
4 August 1974
Montreux-Sports	0–1	FC Vernayaz
10 August 1974
Stade Lausanne	1–2	Yverdon-Sport

== Round 2 ==
The teams from the NLB entered the cup competition in the second round, they were seeded and could not be drawn against each other. Whenever possible, the draw respected local regionalities. The lower-tier team in each drawn tie was granted the home advantage.

=== Summary ===
Team 1	Score	Team 2
10 and 11 August 1974
FC Gurmels	0–7	Fribourg
FC Vouvry	0–1	FC Raron
Concordia	0–1	Solothurn
FC Pieterlen	1–4 (a.e.t.)	SC Kleinhüningen
SV Seebach ZH	2–1	Baden
FC Rapid Lugano	0–2	Locarno
FC Einsielden	5–3 (a.e.t.)	FC Albisrieden
FC Wollishofen ZH	2–3	FC Rüti ZH
Stade Nyonnais	2–1	Martigny-Sports
Signal FC (Bernex)	1–4	Etoile Carouge
FC Schattdorf	0–6	Bellinzona
Blue Stars	2–1	FC Tössfeld
Balzers	1–2 (a.e.t.)	Gossau
FC St.Margrethen	2–5	FC Rebstein
FC Sursee	2–3	Chiasso
US Giubiasco	1–0	Mendrisiostar
Le Locle-Sports	3–3 (a.e.t.) (2–4 p)	Delémont
Corcelles-Cormondrèche	1–5	Biel-Bienne
FC Fétigny	1–1 (a.e.t.) (4–3 p)	Köniz
FC Crans-sur-Céligny	1–3	La Chaux-de-Fonds
FC Rapid Ostermundigen	0–1	Grenchen
Emmenbrücke	1–4	Kriens
SC Schöftland	1–5	Buochs
Laufen	2–6	Nordstern
FC Altstätten (St. Gallen)	3–2 (a.e.t.)	FC Uzwil
FC Weinfelden	3–3 (a.e.t.) (5–3 p)	Juventus Zürich
FC Bülach	3–3 (a.e.t.) (4–3 p)	Young Fellows
Bözingen 34	0–1	Lengnau
FC Rafzerfeld	0–7	Wettingen
FC Selzach	1–2	Aarau
Bulle	0–2	Monthey
FC Vernayaz	1–8	Meyrin
Zähringia BE	2–3	FC Lerchenfeld
Bern	5–1	Central Fribourg
15 August 1974
FC Pratteln	5–0	FC Deitingen
17 August 1974
FC Orbe	6–2	Yverdon-Sport

=== Matches ===
10 August 1974

FC Selzach	1–2	Aarau
Goal	FCA summary	Goal

Zilweg, Selzach

== Round 3 ==
=== Summary ===
Team 1	Score	Team 2
30 August 1974
Kriens	3–2 (a.e.t.)	Buochs
31 August 1974
Fribourg	2–0 (a.e.t.)	FC Raron
La Chaux-de-Fonds	0–1	Grenchen
Monthey	0–0 (a.e.t.)	Meyrin
SV Seebach ZH	1–2	Locarno
Solothurn	5–0	SC Kleinhüningen
FC Einsielden	2–4	FC Rüti ZH
Gossau	4–1	FC Rebstein
FC Altstätten (St. Gallen)	2–1	FC Weinfelden
FC Bülach	2–3	Lengnau
Wettingen	3–0	Aarau
FC Lerchenfeld (Thun)	1–2 (a.e.t.)	Bern
1 September 1974
FC Pratteln	2–6	Nordstern
Delémont	1–3	Biel-Bienne
FC Orbe	6–0	FC Fétigny
Stade Nyonnais	2–4 (a.e.t.)	Etoile Carouge
Bellinzona	6–1	Blue Stars
Chiasso	2–0	US Giubiasco

Replay

Team 1	Score	Team 2
8 September 1974
Meyrin	1–2 (a.e.t.)	Monthey

=== Matches ===
31 August 1974

Wettingen	3–0	Aarau
Goal	FCA summary

Stadion Altenburg, Wettingen

== Round 4 ==
The teams from the NLA entered the cup competition in the fourth round, they were seeded and could not be drawn against each other. The draw was still respecting regionalities and the lower-tier team was again granted the home advantage.

=== Summary ===
Team 1	Score	Team 2
21 September 1974
Locarno	4–2	FC Rüti ZH
Chiasso	0–1	Basel
Fribourg	1–1 (a.e.t.)	Neuchâtel Xamax
Etoile Carouge	5–1	Vevey Sports
Gossau	0–3 (a.e.t.)	Zürich
Biel-Bienne	0–1	Sion
Kriens	2–0	Luzern
FC Altstätten (St. Gallen)	1–8	St. Gallen
Lengnau	0–4	Lausanne-Sport
Bern	1–6 Annulled	Servette
22 September 1974
Bellinzona	3–1	Lugano
Nordstern	2–5 (a.e.t.)	Winterthur
FC Orbe	0–3	Grenchen
Solothurn	1–2	Chênois
Wettingen	2–4	Grasshopper Club
Meyrin	0–3	Young Boys

Annulled: Protest from Bern due to a technical error of the referee. Replayed.

replays

Team 1	Score	Team 2
2 October 1974
Neuchâtel Xamax	3–1	Fribourg
16 October 1974
Bern	0–4	Servette

=== Matches ===
21 September 1974
20:30

Chiasso	0–1	Basel
Sulmoni (yellow card) 35'	FCB summary	25' (0:1) Odermatt; (yellow card) 65' Tanner

Stadio Comunale, Chiasso
Attendance: 3,600
Referee: (Switzerland) Rudolf Renggli (Luzern)

21 September 1974

Gossau	0–3 (a.e.t.)	Zürich
	FCZ summary	98' (0:1) Rutschmann; 104' (0:2) Kuhn; 108' (0:3) Jeandupeux

Sportanlage Buechenwald, Gossau
Attendance: 4,500
Referee: (Switzerland) Hans Schuhmacher (Pfungen)

22 September 1974

Meyrin	0–3	Young Boys
	YB summary	38' (0:1) Bruttin; 83' (0:2) Cornioley; 87' (0:3) Muhmenthaler

Stade des Arbères, Meyrin
Attendance: 1,200
Referee: (Switzerland) Roland Racine (Prilly)

16 October 1974
Replay

Bern	0–4	Servette
	Servette summary	(0:1) Andrey (0:2) Pfister (0:3) Pfister (0:4) Castella

Stadion Neufeld, Bern

== Round 5 ==
=== Summery ===
Team 1	Score	Team 2
15 October 1974
Grasshopper Club	0–0 (a.e.t.)	Young Boys
Chênois	1–0 (a.e.t.)	Locarno
16 October 1974
Etoile Carouge	2–1	Bellinzona
Zürich	1–3	Basel
Sion	1–2	Grenchen
Kriens	1–2 (a.e.t.)	Winterthur
St. Gallen	0–1	Lausanne-Sport
Xamax	0–0	Servette

Replays

Team 1	Score	Team 2
27 October 1974
Young Boys	2–1	Grasshopper Club
31 October 1974
Servette	3–1	Xamax

=== Matches ===
15 Obtober 1974

Grasshopper Club	0–0 (a.e.t.)	Young Boys
Elsener (yellow card) 25'; T. Niggl (yellow card) 111'	YB summary	(yellow card) 57' Bruttin; (yellow card) 97' Cornioley; (yellow card) 110' Trümpler

Hardturm, Zürich
Attendance: 3,000
Referee: (Switzerland) Mario Osta (Oberuzwil)

16 Obtober 1974
20:15

Zürich	1–3	Basel
Martinelli 6' (1:0); Zigerlig (yellow card) 18'; Bionda (yellow card) 61'; Heer (yellow card) 81'	FCZ summary FCB summary	12' (1:1) Hitzfeld; (yellow card) 16' Hasler; (yellow card) 26' Fischli; (yellow card) 40' Odermatt; 52' (1:2) Ramseier; 62' (1:3) Hitzfeld

Letzigrund, Zürich
Attendance: 13,500
Referee: (Switzerland) Bruno Della Bruna Lumino

16 October 1974

Xamax	0–0 (a.e.t.)	Servette
	Servette summary

Stade de la Maladière, Neuchâtel

27 October 1974

Young Boys	2–1	Grasshopper Club
Siegenthaler 42' (1:0); Schild 83' (2:0)	YB summary	(yellow card) 44' H. Niggl; (yellow card) 66' Grahn; (yellow card) 85'; 86' (2:1) Gross

Wankdorf Stadium, Bern
Attendance: 9,500
Referee: (Switzerland) Rudolf Renggli (Luzern)

31 October 1974

Servette	3–1	Xamax
2x Zapico; 1x Guyot	Servette summary	Goal

Stade des Charmilles, Geneva

== Quarter-finals ==
=== Summary ===
The first legs were played on and the return legs were played on

Team 1	Agg.	Team 2	1st leg	2nd leg
Etoile Carouge	2–4	Basel	1–2	1–2
Grenchen	2–2	Winterthur	2–0	0–2 (2–3 p)
Lausanne-Sport	3–6	Young Boys	1–2	2–4
Chênois	2–2 (a)	Servette	1–0	1–2

=== Matches ===
30 October 1974
20:15

Étoile Carouge	1–2	Basel
Manai 8' (1:0); Fatton (yellow card) 78'; Manai (yellow card) 82'	FCB summary	19' (1:1) Balmer; (yellow card) 26' Balmer; (yellow card) 58' Ramseier; 80' (pen. 1:2) Hitzfeld

Stade de la Fontenette, Carouge
Attendance: 3,600
Referee: (Switzerland) Gérard Racine (Biel/Bienne)

3 November 1974
14:30

Basel	2–1	Étoile Carouge
Hitzfeld 19' (1:0); Mundschin 42' (2:0)	Summary	78' (o.g. 2:1) Ramseier

St. Jakob Stadium, Basel
Attendance: 5,000
Referee: (Switzerland) Pierre Despont Lausanne

30 October 1974

Lausanne-Sport	1–2	Young Boys
Chapuisat (yellow card) 9' (yellow-red card) 58'; Vergères 72' (1:1)	YB summary	37' (0:1) Bruttin; 78' (1:2) Bruttin

Pontaise, Lausanne
Attendance: 4,500
Referee: (Switzerland) Otto Isler (Zürich)

3 November 1974

Young Boys	4–2	Lausanne-Sport
Andersen 33' (1:1); Siegenthaler 36' (2:1); Siegenthaler 69' (3:2); Burgener 83' (o.g.)	YB summary	21' (0:1) Rub; 47' (2:2) Rub

Wankdorf Stadium, Bern
Attendance: 10,000
Referee: (Switzerland) Uldry

3 November 1974

Chênois	1–0	Servette
Goal	Servette summary

Stade des Trois-Chêne, Thônex

6 November 1974

Servette	2–1	Chênois
Pfister; Pfister	Servette summary	Goal

Stade des Charmilles, Geneva

Chênois won on away goals rule.

== Semi-finals ==
=== Summary ===
The first legs were played on and the return legs were played on

Team 1	Agg.	Team 2	1st leg	2nd leg
Chênois	2–6	Basel	1–4	1–2
Winterthur	2–1	Young Boys	2–1	0–0

=== Matches ===
9 March 1975
15:00

Chênois	1–4	Basel
Marietan (yellow card) 28'; Mundschin 79' (o.g. 1:1)	FCB summary	2' (0:1) Hitzfeld; (yellow card) 25' Fischli; 80' (1:2) Hitzfeld; 82' (1:3) Stohler; 87' (1:4) Demarmels

Stade des Trois-Chêne, Thônex
Attendance: 2,200
Referee: (Switzerland) Ulysse Darbellay (Roche)

11 March 1975
20:00
Semi-final
Second leg

Basel	2–1	Chênois
Rahmen 64' (1:0); Hitzfeld (yellow card) 65'; Hitzfeld 83' (2:0)	FCB summary	(yellow card) 70' Clivaz; 90' (2:1) Bizzini

St. Jakob Stadium, Basel
Attendance: 5,800
Referee: (Switzerland) Bruno Della Bruna (Lumino)

9 March 1975
15:00

Winterthur	2–1	Young Boys
Risi 6' (1:0); Grünig (yellow card) 35'; Grünig 67' (2:0)	YB summary	72' (2:1) Trümpler; (yellow card) 77' Trümpler

Schützenwiese, Winterthur
Attendance: 7,500
Referee: (Switzerland) André Favre (Echallens)

11 March 1975
20:00

Young Boys	0–0	Winterthur
Andersen (yellow card) 70'	YB summary

Wankdorf Stadium, Bern
Attendance: 10,000
Referee: (Switzerland) René Matthieu (Sierre)

== Final ==
The final was held at the former Wankdorf Stadium in Bern on Easter Monday 1975.

=== Summary ===
Team 1	Score	Team 2
31 March 1975
Basel	2–1 (a.e.t.)	Winterthur

=== Telegram ===
31 March 1975
14:30

Basel	2–1 (a.e.t.)	Winterthur
Demarmels 48' (1:0); Walter Balmer 115'	FCB summary	66' (1:1) E. Meyer

Wankdorf Stadium, Bern
Attendance: 28,000
Referee: (Switzerland) Gérard Racine (Biel/Bienne)

Basel won the cup and this was the club's fifth cup title to this date.

== Further in Swiss football ==
- 1974–75 Nationalliga A
- 1974–75 Swiss 1. Liga
- 1974–75 FC Basel season

== Sources ==
- Fussball-Schweiz
- Cup 1974–75 at fcb-achiv.ch
- Switzerland 1974–75 at RSSSF

Preceded by 1973–74	Swiss Cup seasons	Succeeded by 1975–76
