= 1967–68 Swiss 1. Liga =

1. Liga
- Season: 1967–68
- Champions: 1. Liga champions: Etoile Carouge; Group West: Etoile Carouge; Group Cenral: FC Porrentruy; Group South and East: Mendrisiostar
- Promoted: Etoile Carouge; Mendrisiostar
- Relegated: Group West: FC Raron; FC Versoix; Group Central: FC Alle; ASEP Saint-Imier; Group South and East: FC Widnau; FC Brunnen
- Matches: 3 times 156 matches and 6 deciders plus 10 play-offs

The 1967–68 1. Liga season was the 36th season of the 1. Liga since its creation in 1931. At this time, the 1. Liga was the third tier of the Swiss football league system and it was the highest level of amateur football. The two higher divisions in Switzerland, at this time, were becoming professional or, at least, semi-professional.

== Format ==
There were 39 teams competing in the 1. Liga 1967–68 season. They were divided into three regional groups, each group with 13 teams. Within each group, the teams would play a double round-robin to decide their league position. Two points were awarded for a win. The three group winners and the three runners-up then contested a play-off round to decide the two promotion slots. The last two placed teams in each group were relegated to the 2. Liga (fourth tier).

== Group West ==
=== Teams, locations ===
Club	Based in	Canton	Stadium	Capacity
US Campagnes GE	Geneva	Geneva		
FC Cantonal Neuchâtel	Neuchâtel	Neuchâtel	Stade de la Maladière	25,500
CS Chênois	Thônex	Geneva	Stade des Trois-Chêne	8,000
Étoile Carouge FC	Carouge	Geneva	Stade de la Fontenette	3,690
FC Fontainemelon	Neuchâtel	Neuchâtel	Centre Sportif Fontainemelon	1,000
FC Le Locle	Le Locle	Neuchâtel	Installation sportive - Jeanneret	3,142
FC Martigny-Sports	Martigny	Valais	Stade d'Octodure	2,500
FC Monthey	Monthey	Valais	Stade Philippe Pottier	1,800
FC Raron	Raron	Valais	Sportplatz Rhoneglut	1,000
FC Stade Lausanne	Ouchy, Lausanne	Vaud	Centre sportif de Vidy	1,000
FC Versoix	Versoix	Geneva	Centre sportif de la Bécassière	1,000
Vevey Sports	Vevey	Vaud	Stade de Copet	4,000
Yverdon-Sport FC	Yverdon-les-Bains	Vaud	Stade Municipal	6,600

=== Final league table ===
Pos	Team	Pld	W	D	L	GF	GA	GD	Pts	Qualification or relegation
1	Etoile Carouge FC	24	16	5	3	61	25	+36	37	Play-off to Nationalliga B
2	FC Le Locle	24	15	5	4	59	34	+25	35	Play-off to Nationalliga B
3	FC Monthey	24	15	4	5	49	25	+24	34	
4	FC Cantonal Neuchâtel	24	10	7	7	39	37	+2	27	
5	Vevey-Sports	24	11	4	9	36	31	+5	26	
6	Yverdon-Sport FC	24	10	6	8	38	34	+4	26	
7	CS Chênois	24	9	5	10	42	49	−7	23	
8	FC Fontainemelon	24	4	11	9	31	51	−20	19	
9	FC Martigny-Sports	24	6	6	12	42	53	−11	18	
10	US Campagnes GE	24	7	4	13	33	49	−16	18	
11	FC Raron	24	6	5	13	37	46	−9	17	Play-out against relegation
12	FC Versoix	24	6	5	13	24	39	−15	17	Play-out against relegation
13	FC Stade Lausanne	24	3	11	10	26	44	−18	17	Play-out against relegation

Source: RSSSF
Rules for classification: 1) Points; 2) Goal difference within the league, but decider play-off for qualifiers.

=== Relegation play-out ===
Team 1	Score	Team 2
FC Stade Lausanne	4–2	FC Raron
FC Versoix	1–2	FC Stade Lausanne
FC Raron	n/p	FC Versoix

FC Stade Lausanne won both matches and remain in the division. The match Raron-Versoix was not played. Both teams were relegated to 2. Liga Interregional.

== Group Central ==
=== Teams, locations ===
Club	Based in	Canton	Stadium	Capacity
FC Alle	Alle	Jura	Centre Sportif Régional	2,000
ASEP Saint-Imier|	Saint-Imier	Bern	Terrain de Fin-des-Fourches	1,000
FC Breitenbach	Breitenbach	Solothurn	Grien	2,000
SC Burgdorf	Burgdorf	Bern	Stadion Neumatt	3,850
FC Concordia Basel	Basel	Basel-Stadt	Stadion Rankhof	7,000
FC Dürrenast	Thun	Bern	Stadion Lachen	13,500
FC Emmenbrücke	Emmen	Lucerne	Stadion Gersag	8,700
FC Langenthal	Langenthal	Bern	Rankmatte	2,000
FC Minerva Bern	Bern	Bern	Spitalacker	1,450
FC Nordstern Basel	Basel	Basel-Stadt	Rankhof	7,600
BSC Old Boys	Basel	Basel-Stadt	Stadion Schützenmatte	8,000
FC Porrentruy	Porrentruy	Jura	Stade du Tirage	4,226
SC Zofingen	Zofingen	Aargau	Sportanlagen Trinermatten	2,000

=== Final league table ===
Pos	Team	Pld	W	D	L	GF	GA	GD	Pts	Qualification or relegation
1	FC Porrentruy	24	17	5	2	57	15	+42	39	Play-off to Nationalliga B
2	FC Emmenbrücke	24	15	3	6	53	25	+28	33	Play-off to Nationalliga B
3	FC Minerva Bern	24	12	7	5	48	27	+21	31	
4	FC Dürrenast	24	11	6	7	43	31	+12	28	
5	FC Langenthal	24	10	6	8	51	51	0	26	
6	FC Concordia Basel	24	12	1	11	62	46	+16	25	
7	FC Breitenbach	24	8	8	8	43	33	+10	24	
8	SC Burgdorf	24	8	7	9	36	34	+2	23	
9	SC Zofingen	24	8	5	11	38	36	+2	21	
10	FC Nordstern Basel	24	8	4	12	43	44	−1	20	Play-out against relegation
11	BSC Old Boys	24	7	6	11	35	46	−11	20	Play-out against relegation
12	FC Alle	24	8	4	12	31	63	−32	20	Play-out against relegation
13	ASEP Saint-Imier	24	1	0	23	19	108	−89	2	Relegation to 2. Liga Interregional

Source: RSSSF
Rules for classification: 1) Points; 2) Goal difference within the league, but decider play-off for qualifiers.

=== Relegation play-out ===
Team 1	Score	Team 2
FC Alle	1–1	FC Nordstern Basel
BSC Old Boys	1–0	FC Alle
FC Nordstern Basel	0–0	BSC Old Boys

FC Alle are relegated to 2. Liga Interregional. BSC Old Boys and FC Nordstern Basel remain in the division.

== Group South and East ==
=== Teams, locations ===
Club	Canton	Stadium	Capacity	
FC Amriswil	Amriswil	Thurgau	Tellenfeld	1,000
FC Blue Stars Zürich	Zürich	Zürich	Hardhof	1,000
FC Brunnen	Brunnen	Schwyz	Wintersried	500
FC Frauenfeld	Frauenfeld	Thurgau	Kleine Allmend	6,370
FC Küsnacht	Küsnacht	Zürich	Sportanlage Heslibach	2,300
FC Locarno	Locarno	Ticino	Stadio comunale Lido	5,000
Mendrisiostar	Mendrisio	Ticino	Centro Sportivo Comunale	4,000
FC Red Star Zürich	Zürich	Zürich	Allmend Brunau	2,000
FC Schaffhausen	Schaffhausen	Schaffhausen	Stadion Breite	7,300
FC Uster|	Uster	Zürich	Sportanlage Buchholz	7,000
FC Vaduz	Vaduz	Liechtenstein	Rheinpark Stadion	7,584
FC Widnau	Windnau	St. Gallen	Sportanlage Aegeten	2,000
SC Zug	Zug	Zug	Herti Allmend Stadion	6,000

=== Final league table ===
Pos	Team	Pld	W	D	L	GF	GA	GD	Pts	Qualification or relegation
1	Mendrisiostar	24	17	5	2	50	20	+30	39	Play-off to Nationalliga B
2	FC Frauenfeld	24	13	8	3	57	27	+30	34	Play-off to Nationalliga B
3	FC Vaduz	24	12	4	8	41	33	+8	28	
4	FC Locarno	24	9	10	5	40	35	+5	28	
5	FC Küsnacht	24	9	7	8	32	37	−5	25	
6	FC Schaffhausen	24	9	7	8	41	36	+5	25	
7	FC Red Star Zürich	24	6	10	8	37	38	−1	22	
8	SC Zug	24	7	8	9	30	33	−3	22	
9	FC Uster	24	7	8	9	22	30	−8	22	
10	FC Amriswil	24	5	10	9	32	39	−7	20	
11	FC Blue Stars Zürich	24	7	6	11	31	40	−9	20	
12	FC Widnau	24	4	7	13	28	44	−16	15	Relegation to 2. Liga Interregional
13	FC Brunnen	24	3	6	15	21	50	−29	12	Relegation to 2. Liga Interregional

Source: RSSSF
Rules for classification: 1) Points; 2) Goal difference within the league, but decider play-off for qualifiers.

== Promotion play-off ==
The three group winners played a two legged tie against one of the runners-up to decide the three finalists. The games were played on 2 and 9 June 1968.

=== Qualification round ===
Team 1	Score	Team 2
FC Porrentruy	3–1	FC Frauenfeld
FC Frauenfeld	1–1	FC Porrentruy

FC Porrentruy win 4–2 on aggregate and continue to the finals.

Team 1	Score	Team 2
Etoile Carouge FC	0–0	FC Emmenbrücke
FC Emmenbrücke	1–1	Etoile Carouge FC

Etoile Carouge FC are qualified as best classed in the regular season, FC Emmenbrücke is eliminated.

Team 1	Score	Team 2
Mendrisiostar	3–0	FC Le Locle
FC Le Locle	3–0	Mendrisiostar

Mendrisiostar and Le Locle-Sports are qualified as best classed in the regular season, FC Emmenbrücke is eliminated..

=== Final round ===
The games were played on 16 and 23 June 1968.

Team 1	Score	Team 2
FC Le Locle	1–2	Etoile Carouge FC
Etoile Carouge FC	1–1	FC Le Locle

Etoile Carouge FC won 3–2 on aggregate and are promoted to 1968–69 Nationalliga B..

These games were played on 23 and 30 June 1968.

Team 1	Score	Team 2
Mendrisiostar	2–0	FC Porrentruy
FC Porrentruy	1–2	Mendrisiostar

Mendrisiostar won 4–1 on aggregate, are declaired 1. Liga champions and are promoted to 1968–69 Nationalliga B.

== Further in Swiss football ==
- 1967–68 Nationalliga A
- 1967–68 Nationalliga B
- 1967–68 Swiss Cup

== Sources ==
- Switzerland 1967–68 at RSSSF

Preceded by 1966–67	Seasons in Swiss 1. Liga	Succeeded by 1968–69
