= 1968–69 Swiss Cup =

Tournament details
- Country: Switzerland

Final positions
- Champions: St. Gallen
- Runners-up: Bellinzona

The 1968–69 Swiss Cup was the 44th season of Switzerland's football cup competition, organised annually since 1925–26 by the Swiss Football Association (ASF/SFV).

== Overview ==
This season's cup competition began on the weekend of 7 and 8 September 1968, with the games of the first round. The competition was to be completed on Whit Monday 26 May 1969 with the final, which was traditionally held at the former Wankdorf Stadium in Bern. The clubs from this season's Nationalliga B (NLB) were given byes for the first two rounds and entered the competition in the third round. The clubs from this season's Nationalliga A (NLA) were granted byes for the first three rounds. These teams joined the competition in the fourth round, which was played on the week-end of 2 and 3 November.

The matches were played in a knockout format. In the event of a draw after 90 minutes, the match went into extra time. In the first two rounds, no replays were foreseen, at the end of extra time if the scores were level, a toss of a coin would decide the outcome of the match. After this first stage, from round 3 onwards, in the event of a draw at the end of extra time, a replay was foreseen and this was played on the visiting team's pitch. If the replay ended in a draw after extra time, a toss of a coin would decide the outcome of these encounters. The cup winners qualified themselves for the first round of the Cup Winners' Cup in the next season.

== Round 1 ==
In this first phase, the lower league teams (1. Liga and lower) that had qualified themselves for the competition through their regional football association's regional cup competitions or their association's requirements, competed here. Whenever possible, the draw respected local regionalities. The lower-tier team in each drawn encounter was granted the home advantage, if so wished.

=== Summary ===
Team 1	Score	Team 2
7 and 8 September 1968
FC Feuerthalen	1–0	FC Tössfeld (Winterthur)
Vaduz	3–4	FC Rheineck
Gossau	2–1	FC Bad Ragaz
Schaffhausen	5–0	FC Adliswil
FC Meisterschwanden	2–4	Buochs
SC Schöftland	1–1 (a.e.t.) *	Luzerner SC (t)
FC Küsnacht ZH	1–0	Uster
SC Zug	3–1	FC Küsnacht am Rigi
AS Gambarogno	0–1	Locarno
FC Ponte Tresa	1–5 (a.e.t.)	US Giubiasco
Emmenbrücke	2–1	Menziken
FC Polizei ZH	2–0	Red Star
Blue Stars	3–1	FC Wetzikon
FC Turicum	2–1	FC Lachen
FC Buchs SG	0–4	FC Amriswil
FC Oerlikon ZH	4–1	FC Wallisellen
Frauenfeld	4–1	FC Wil
Dürrenast	4–2	Central Fribourg
Bern	2–0	Länggasse BE
Burgdorf	5–1	Minerva Bern
FC Oensingen	2–0	FC Kirchberg BE
SC Zofingen	5–0	Kappel bei Olten
FC Breitenbach	0–1 (a.e.t.)	Concordia
FC Pratteln	Forfait awd 3-0 *	Black Stars
Old Boys	0–2	SC Kleinhüningen
Nordstern	2–5	FC Breite Basel
FC Porrentruy	3–1	Fontenais
Delémont	3–0	FC Aesch
Moutier	2–4	FC Trimbach
FC Langenthal	3–2	Selzach
FC Flamatt	1–3	Rotweiss Bümpliz
FC Ecublens	0–3	Chênois
FC Le Locle	2–1	FC Couvet
Vevey Sports	3–1	FC Salgesch
Stade Nyonnais	3–0	US Lausanne
ES Malley	3–2	US Campagnes GE
FC Compesières GE	3–0	Stade Lausanne
Martigny-Sports	2–1	Monthey
Meyrin	0–2	FC Plan-les-Ouates
Yverdon-Sport	3–0	Grünstern Ipsach
FC Boudry	3–0	FC Aurore Bienne
Bulle	3–2 (a.e.t.)	FC Raron
FC Fétigny	1–4	FC Portalban
Cantonal Neuchâtel	2–1	FC Fontainemelon

- (t): Luzerner SC qualified on toss of a coin
- The Black Stars player Stebel was sent off by the referee. The player then punched the referee, who was then taken to the hospital. FC Pratteln were leading by 2–0 at this point, but the match was abandoned. The game was awarded forfeit 3–0 win for FC Pratteln by the ASF/SFV.

== Round 2 ==
=== Summary ===
Team 1	Score	Team 2
21 and 22 September 1968
Chênois	1–0	Le Locle
Vevey Sports	1–0	Stade Nyonnais
ES Malley	3–0	FC Compesières GE
Martigny-Sports	2–0	FC Plan-les-Ouates
Yverdon-Sport	3–1	FC Boudry
FC Langenthal	4–2	Burgdorf
Bulle	2–0	Rotweiss Bümpliz
Bern	8–1	FC Portalban
Dürrenast	0–3	Cantonal Neuchâtel
Concordia	3–0	FC Trimbach
FC Oensingen	1–3	FC Pratteln
FC Breite	0–2	Delémont
Feuerthalen	1–3 (a.e.t.)	Rheineck
Gossau	2–1 (a.e.t.)	Schaffhausen
Buochs	6–2	Luzerner SC
FC Küsnacht ZH	0–1	SC Zug
Locarno	0–1	US Giubiasco
SC Zofingen	0–1 (a.e.t.)	Emmenbrücke
FC Polizei ZH	0–2 * abd	Blue Stars
29 September 1968
FC Porrentruy	3–0	SC Kleinhüningen
FC Turicum ZH	3–4 (a.e.t.)	FC Amriswil
FC Oerlikon ZH	4–0	Frauenfeld

- Match Polizei-Blue Stars was abandoned at 32' due to heavy rain and then replayed.

Replay

Team 1	Score	Team 2
29 September 1968
FC Polizei ZH	2–1	Blue Stars

== Round 3 ==
The teams from the NLB entered the cup competition in this round. However, they were seeded and could not be drawn against each other. Whenever possible, the draw respected local regionalities. The lower-tier team in each encounter was granted home advantage, if they so wished.

=== Summary ===
Team 1	Score	Team 2
12 and 13 October 1968
Young Fellows	0–0 (a.e.t.)	Emmenbrücke
Grenchen	4–0	FC Porrentruy
Solothurn	1–0 (a.e.t.)	Concordia
Baden	1–0 (a.e.t.)	FC Amriswil
Fribourg	0–1	Martigny-Sports
Urania Genève Sport	1–2 (a.e.t.)	Chênois
SC Zug	0–1	Chiasso
Cantonal Neuchâtel	1–1 (a.e.t.)	Aarau
Yverdon-Sport	3–4	Xamax
Mendrisiostar	0–0 (a.e.t.)	US Giubiasco
Rheineck	0–6	Wettingen
FC Oerlikon ZH	2–3	Brühl
Delémont	1–3	Thun
ES Malley	1–1 (a.e.t.)	Etoile Carouge
Buochs	3–0	FC Polizei ZH
Bern	3–1 (a.e.t.)	FC Pratteln
FC Langenthal	3–2	Gossau
Bulle	1–0	Vevey Sports

Replays

Team 1	Score	Team 2
16 October 1968
Emmenbrücke	0–2	Young Fellows
Aarau (t)	0–0 (a.e.t.)	Cantonal Neuchâtel
US Giubiasco	0–0 (a.e.t.)	Mendrisiostar (t)
Etoile Carouge	2–0	ES Malley

- Aarau won on toss of a coin.
- Mendrisiostar won on toss of a coin.

=== Matches ===
13 October 1968

Cantonal Neuchâtel	1–1 (a.e.t.)	Aarau
Goal	FCA summary	Goal

Stade de la Maladière, Neuchâtel
Referee: (Switzerland)

16 October 1968

Aarau	0–0 (a.e.t.)	Cantonal Neuchâtel
	FCA summary

Stadion Brügglifeld, Aarau
Referee: (Switzerland)
- Aarau won on toss of a coin.

== Round 4 ==
The teams from the NLA entered the cup competition in the fourth round, they were seeded and could not be drawn against each other. The draw was still respecting regionalities, but the lower-tier team was not automatically granted home advantage.

=== Summary ===
Team 1	Score	Team 2
2 November 1968
Chênois	1–2 (a.e.t.)	Servette
Biel-Bienne	1–0	Aarau
Thun	1–2	Basel
2 or 3 November 1968
FC Langenthal	3–3 (a.e.t.)	Luzern
Buochs	1–4	Bellinzona
Etoile Carouge	1–8	Lausanne-Sport
Bulle	2–4	La Chaux-de-Fonds
Grenchen	0–0 (a.e.t.)	Winterthur
Baden	4–5	Grasshopper Club
St. Gallen	3–2 (a.e.t.)	Wettingen
Young Boys	9–1	Bern
Xamax	2–2 (a.e.t.)	Sion
Martigny-Sports	1–1 (a.e.t.)	Solothurn
Chiasso	2–1	Brühl
Zürich	6–3	Young Fellows
Locarno	1–0	Mendrisiostar

Replays

Team 1	Score	Team 2
6 November 1968
Luzern	6–4	FC Langenthal
Sion	4–1	Xamax
24 November 1968
Winterthur	1–2	Grenchen
Solothurn	3–2 (a.e.t.)	Martigny-Sports

=== Matches ===
2 November 1968

Chênois	1–2 (a.e.t.)	Servette
Goal	Servette summary	2x Desbiolles

Stade des Trois-Chêne, Thônex
Referee: (Switzerland)

2 November 1968

Biel-Bienne	1–0	Aarau
Goal	FCA summary

Stadion Gurzelen, Biel/Bienne
Referee: (Switzerland)

2 November 1968

Thun	1–2	Basel
Balmer 43' (1:1)	Summary	17' (0:1) Fischli; 63' (1:2) Odermatt

Stadion Lachen, Thun
Attendance: 4,500
Referee: (Switzerland) Anton Bucheli (Luzern)

3 November 1968

Zürich	6–3	Young Fellows
Kuhn 22' (1:0); Winiger 30' (2:0); Martinelli 40' (3:0); Künzli 58' (4:1); Martinelli 66' (5:1); Künzli 70' (6:1)	FCZ summary	53' (3:1) Kaiserauer; 85' (6:2) von Burg; 90' (6:3) von Burg

Letzigrund, Zürich
Attendance: 1,800
Referee: (Switzerland) Eugen Boller (Reinach)/(Bottmingen)

== Round 5 ==
=== Summary ===
Team 1	Score	Team 2
15 December 1968
Basel	3–1	Luzern
Bellinzona	3–2	Lausanne-Sport
La Chaux-de-Fonds	1–3	Servette
Grenchen	0–1	Grasshopper Club
St. Gallen	2–1	Young Boys
Solothurn	0–3	Chiasso
Zürich	0–1	Lugano
'1 February 1969
Sion	3–1	Biel-Bienne

=== Matches ===
15 December 1968
14:30

Basel	3–1	Luzern
Ramseier 19' (1:0); Benthaus 75' (2:1); Hauser 90' (pen. 3:1)	FCB summary	74' (1:1) Gwerder; (red card) ?' Flury

St. Jakob Stadium, Basel
Attendance: 9.200
Referee: (Switzerland) Fernand Burioli (Lausanne)

15 December 1968

La Chaux-de-Fonds	1–3	Servette
Goal	Servette summary	Heutschi; Desbiolles; Pottier

Centre Sportif de la Charrière, La Chaux-de-Fonds
Referee: (Switzerland)

15 December 1968

Zürich	0–1	Lugano
Neumann (yellow card) 17'; Münch (yellow card) 79'	FCZ summary	(yellow card) 17' Simonetti; 20' (0:1) Blumer

Letzigrund, Zürich
Attendance: 17,500
Referee: (Switzerland) Gilbert Droz (Marin)

== Quarter-finals ==
=== Summary ===
Team 1	Score	Team 2
22 February 1969
Lugano	0–1 (a.e.t.)	St. Gallen
Servette	1–0	Basel
23 February 1969
Bellinzona	3–1	Sion
Chiasso	3–3	Grasshopper Club

Replay

Team 1	Score	Team 2
6 March 1969
Grasshopper Club	1–0	Chiasso

=== Matches ===
22 February 1969
14:30

Servette	1–0	Basel
Pottier 89' (1:0)	FCB summary	(yellow card) 53' Wenger

Stade des Charmilles, Geneva
Attendance: 7,000
Referee: (Switzerland) Rudolf Scheurer (Bettlach)

== Semi-finals ==
=== Summary ===
Team 1	Score	Team 2
7 April 1969
St. Gallen	3–0	Servette
Bellinzona	2–1	Grasshopper Club

== Final ==
The final was held at the former Wankdorf Stadium in Bern on Whit Monday 1969.

=== Summary ===
Team 1	Score	Team 2
26 May 1969
St. Gallen	2–0	Bellinzona

=== Telegram ===
26 May 1969
15:00

St. Gallen	2–0	Bellinzona
Nafziger 61' (1:0); 71' (2:0)	Fussball-Schweiz summary

Wankdorf Stadium, Bern
Attendance: 24,000
Referee: (Switzerland) Gilbert Droz (Marin)

St. Gallen won the cup and this was the club's first cup title to this date.

== Further in Swiss football ==
- 1968–69 Nationalliga A
- 1968–69 Swiss 1. Liga

== Sources ==
- Fussball-Schweiz
- FCB Cup games 1968–69 at fcb-achiv.ch
- Switzerland 1968–69 at RSSSF

Preceded by 1967–68	Swiss Cup seasons	Succeeded by 1969–70
