= 1973–74 Swiss 1. Liga =

1. Liga
- Season: 1973–74
- Champions: 1. Liga champions: FC Raron; Group West: FC Bulle; Group Cenral: FC Solothurn; Group South and East: FC Gossau
- Promoted: FC Raron; US Giubiasco
- Relegated: Group West: Urania Genève Sport; FC Thun; Group Central: FC Moutier; FC Deitingen; Group South and East: FC Rapid Lugano; FC Rorschach
- Matches: 3 times 156 and 1 decider plus 9 play-offs

The 1973–74 1. Liga was the 42nd season of this league since its creation in 1931. At this time, the 1. Liga was the third tier of the Swiss football league system and it was the highest level of amateur football.

== Format ==
There were 39 clubs in the 1. Liga. These were divided into three regional groups, each with 13 teams. Within each group, the teams would play a double round-robin to decide their league position. Two points were awarded for a win. The three group winners and the runners-up contested a play-off round to decide the two promotion slots. The last two placed teams in each group were directly relegated to the 2. Liga (fourth tier).

== Group West ==
=== Teams ===
Club	Canton	Stadium	Capacity
ASI Audax-Friul	Neuchâtel	Pierre-à-Bot	1,700
FC Bulle	Fribourg	Stade de Bouleyres	7,000
FC Central Fribourg	Fribourg	Guintzet	2,000
FC Dürrenast	Bern	Stadion Lachen	13,500
FC Le Locle	Neuchâtel	Installation sportive - Jeanneret	3,142
FC Meyrin	Geneva	Stade des Arbères	9,000
FC Monthey	Valais	Stade Philippe Pottier	1,800
FC Raron	Valais	Sportplatz Rhoneglut	1,000
FC Sierre	Valais	Complexe Ecossia	2,000
FC Stade Nyonnais	Vaud	Stade de Colovray	7,200
FC Thun	Bern	Stadion Lachen	10,350
Urania Genève Sport	Geneva	Stade de Frontenex	4,000
Yverdon-Sport FC	Vaud	Stade Municipal	6,600

=== Final league table ===
Pos	Team	Pld	W	D	L	GF	GA	GD	Pts	Qualification or relegation
1	FC Bulle	24	14	6	4	53	32	+21	34	Play-off to Nationalliga B
2	FC Raron	24	14	4	6	39	20	+19	32	Play-off to Nationalliga B
3	FC Monthey	24	12	4	8	37	24	+13	28	
4	FC Dürrenast	24	9	8	7	45	43	+2	26	
5	FC Stade Nyonnais	24	9	8	7	36	39	−3	26	
6	FC Le Locle	24	9	7	8	48	35	+13	25	
7	ASI Audax-Friul	24	9	6	9	45	51	−6	24	
8	FC Sierre	24	8	7	9	33	42	−9	23	
9	FC Meyrin	24	8	6	10	33	33	0	22	
10	Central Fribourg	24	9	4	11	38	42	−4	22	
11	Yverdon-Sport FC	24	8	5	11	26	27	−1	21	Play-out against relegation
12	FC Thun	24	7	7	10	38	46	−8	21	Play-out against relegation
13	Urania Genève Sport	24	2	4	18	28	65	−37	8	Relegation to 2. Liga Interregional

Source: RSSSF
Rules for classification: 1) Points; 2) Goal difference within the league, but decider play-off for qualifiers; 3) Goals scored; 4) Head-to-head points; 5) Away goals scored; 6) Draw.

=== Decider for eleventh place ===
The decider was played on 1 June in Solothurn.

Team 1	Score	Team 2
Yverdon-Sport FC	3–2	FC Thun

Yverdon-Sport FC win and remain in division. FC Thun are relegated directly to 2. Liga Interregional.

== Group Central ==
=== Teams ===
Club	Canton	Stadium	Capacity
FC Bern	Bern	Stadion Neufeld	14,000
FC Brunnen	Schwyz	Wintersried	500
SC Buochs	Nidwalden	Stadion Seefeld	5,000
FC Concordia Basel	Basel-City	Stadion Rankhof	7,000
FC Deitingen	Solothurn	Heidenegg	5,500
SR Delémont	Jura	La Blancherie	5,263
FC Emmenbrücke	Lucerne	Stadion Gersag	8,700
SC Kriens	Lucerne	Stadion Kleinfeld	5,100
FC Laufen	Basel-Country	Sportplatz Nau	3,000
FC Moutier	Bern	Stade de Chalière	5,000
FC Porrentruy	Jura	Stade du Tirage	4,226
FC Solothurn	Solothurn	Stadion FC Solothurn	6,750
SC Zug	Zug	Herti Allmend Stadion	6,000

=== Final league table ===
Pos	Team	Pld	W	D	L	GF	GA	GD	Pts	Qualification or relegation
1	FC Solothurn	24	14	5	5	37	21	+16	33	Play-off to Nationalliga B
2	FC Brunnen	24	13	6	5	51	32	+19	32	Play-off to Nationalliga B
3	FC Emmenbrücke	24	13	4	7	54	34	+20	30	
4	SR Delémont	24	11	7	6	36	20	+16	29	
5	FC Concordia Basel	24	9	7	8	33	36	−3	25	
6	FC Laufen	24	9	5	10	33	37	−4	23	
7	FC Porrentruy	24	8	7	9	32	43	−11	23	
8	SC Zug	24	7	8	9	31	33	−2	22	
9	SC Buochs	24	8	5	11	37	39	−2	21	
10	FC Bern	24	10	1	13	45	48	−3	21	
11	SC Kriens	24	6	9	9	34	41	−7	21	
12	FC Moutier	24	3	10	11	26	44	−18	16	Relegation to 2. Liga Interregional
13	FC Deitingen	24	6	4	14	40	61	−21	16	Relegation to 2. Liga Interregional

Source: RSSSF
Rules for classification: 1) Points; 2) Goal difference within the league, but decider play-off for qualifiers; 3) Goals scored; 4) Head-to-head points; 5) Away goals scored; 6) Draw.

== Group South and East ==
=== Teams ===
Club	Canton	Stadium	Capacity
FC Baden	Aargau	Esp Stadium	7,000
FC Blue Stars Zürich	Zürich	Hardhof	1,000
SC Brühl	St. Gallen	Paul-Grüninger-Stadion	4,200
FC Chur	Grisons	Ringstrasse	2,820
FC Frauenfeld	Thurgau	Kleine Allmend	6,370
US Giubiasco	Ticino	Campo Semine	1,000
FC Gossau	St. Gallen	Sportanlage Buechenwald	3,500
FC Locarno	Locarno, Ticino	Stadio comunale Lido	5,000
FC Rapid Lugano	Ticino	Cornaredo Stadium	6,330
FC Red Star Zürich	Zürich	Allmend Brunau	2,000
FC Rorschach	Schwyz	Sportplatz Kellen	1,000
FC Schaffhausen	Schaffhausen	Stadion Breite	7,300
FC Uzwil	St. Gallen	Rüti	1,000

=== Final league table ===
Pos	Team	Pld	W	D	L	GF	GA	GD	Pts	Qualification or relegation
1	FC Gossau	24	15	6	3	54	28	+26	36	Play-off to Nationalliga B
2	US Giubiasco	24	12	10	2	32	21	+11	34	Play-off to Nationalliga B
3	FC Frauenfeld	24	13	6	5	51	27	+24	32	
4	FC Baden	24	13	6	5	39	20	+19	32	
5	FC Chur	24	13	6	5	47	30	+17	32	
6	SC Brühl	24	11	4	9	38	44	−6	26	
7	FC Uzwil	24	10	5	9	37	38	−1	25	
8	FC Blue Stars Zürich	24	8	7	9	41	38	+3	23	
9	FC Locarno	24	7	6	11	30	31	−1	20	
10	FC Schaffhausen	24	6	8	10	29	37	−8	20	
11	FC Red Star Zürich	24	4	7	13	25	54	−29	15	
12	FC Rapid Lugano	24	1	7	16	10	40	−30	9	Relegation to 2. Liga Interregional
13	FC Rorschach	24	4	0	20	31	56	−25	8	Relegation to 2. Liga Interregional

Source: RSSSF
Rules for classification: 1) Points; 2) Goal difference within the league, but decider play-off for qualifiers; 3) Goals scored; 4) Head-to-head points; 5) Away goals scored; 6) Draw.

== Promotion play-off ==
The three group winners played a two legged tie against one of the runners-up to decide the three finalists. The games were played on 1 and 8 June.

=== First round ===
Team 1	Score	Team 2
FC Brunnen	2–1	FC Bulle
FC Bulle	0–0	FC Brunnen

FC Brunnen win 2–1 on aggregate and continue to the finals.

Team 1	Score	Team 2
FC Gossau	0–0	FC Raron
FC Raron	2–0	FC Gossau

FC Raron win 2–0 on aggregate and continue to the finals.

Team 1	Score	Team 2
FC Solothurn	1–1	US Giubiasco
US Giubiasco	1–1	FC Solothurn

2–2 on aggregate. Giubiasco qualified as best classed in the regular season and continue to the finals.

=== Final round ===
Pos	Team	Pld	W	D	L	GF	GA	GD	Pts	RAR	GIU	BRN
1	FC Raron	2	1	0	1	3	1	+2	2	—	—	3–0
2	US Giubiasco	2	1	0	1	2	2	0	2	1–0	—	—
3	FC Brunnen	2	1	0	1	2	4	−2	2	—	2–1	—

Source: RSSSF

FC Raron are 1. Liga champions, US Giubiasco are runners-up and these two teams are promoted.

== Further in Swiss football ==
- 1973–74 Nationalliga A
- 1973–74 Nationalliga B
- 1973–74 Swiss Cup

== Sources ==
- Switzerland 1973–74 at RSSSF

Preceded by 1972–73	Seasons in Swiss 1. Liga	Succeeded by 1974–75
