= 1974–75 Swiss 1. Liga =

1. Liga
- Season: 1974–75
- Champions: 1. Liga champions: Group West: FC Bern; Group Cenral: SC Kriens; Group South and East: FC Gossau
- Promoted: FC Gossau; FC Young Fellows Zürich
- Relegated: Group West: FC Sierre; Yverdon-Sport FC; Group Central: FC Porrentruy; FC Ebikon; Group South and East: FC Wil; FC Uzwil
- Matches: 3 times 156 and 1 decider plus 9 play-offs

The 1974–75 1. Liga was the 43rd season of this league since its creation in 1931. At this time, the 1. Liga was the third tier of the Swiss football league system and it was the highest level of amateur football.

== Format ==
There were 39 clubs in the 1. Liga. These were divided into three regional groups, each with 13 teams. Within each group, the teams would play a double round-robin to decide their league position. Two points were awarded for a win. The three group winners and the runners-up contested a play-off round to decide the two promotion slots. The last two placed teams in each group were directly relegated to the 2. Liga (fourth tier).

== Group West ==
=== Teams ===
Club	Canton	Stadium	Capacity
ASI Audax-Friul	Neuchâtel	Pierre-à-Bot	1,700
FC Bern	Bern	Stadion Neufeld	14,000
FC Boudry	Neuchâtel	Stade des Buchilles	1,500
FC Bulle	Fribourg	Stade de Bouleyres	7,000
FC Central Fribourg	Fribourg	Guintzet	2,000
FC Dürrenast	Bern	Stadion Lachen	13,500
FC Le Locle	Neuchâtel	Installation sportive - Jeanneret	3,142
FC Meyrin	Geneva	Stade des Arbères	9,000
FC Monthey	Valais	Stade Philippe Pottier	1,800
FC Montreux-Sports	Vaud	Stade de Chailly	1,000
FC Sierre	Valais	Complexe Ecossia	2,000
FC Stade Nyonnais	Vaud	Stade de Colovray	7,200
Yverdon-Sport FC	Vaud	Stade Municipal	6,600

=== Final league table ===
Pos	Team	Pld	W	D	L	GF	GA	GD	Pts	Qualification or relegation
1	FC Bern	24	16	4	4	48	18	+30	36	Play-off to Nationalliga B
2	Central Fribourg	24	12	6	6	43	26	+17	30	Play-off to Nationalliga B
3	FC Monthey	24	12	5	7	37	25	+12	29	
4	FC Dürrenast	24	9	8	7	49	34	+15	26	
5	FC Meyrin	24	9	8	7	32	23	+9	26	
6	FC Stade Nyonnais	24	10	5	9	33	33	0	25	
7	FC Boudry	24	10	5	9	32	35	−3	25	
8	FC Le Locle	24	8	7	9	34	40	−6	23	
9	FC Bulle	24	8	5	11	40	54	−14	21	
10	ASI Audax-Friul	24	8	4	12	26	45	−19	20	
11	FC Montreux-Sports	24	7	5	12	39	49	−10	19	
12	FC Sierre	24	4	8	12	24	33	−9	16	Relegation to 2. Liga Interregional
13	Yverdon-Sport FC	24	6	4	14	23	45	−22	16	Relegation to 2. Liga Interregional

Source: RSSSF
Rules for classification: 1) Points; 2) Goal difference within the league, but decider play-off for qualifiers; 3) Goals scored; 4) Head-to-head points; 5) Away goals scored; 6) Draw.

== Group Central ==
=== Teams ===
Club	Canton	Stadium	Capacity
US Boncourt	Jura	Stade Communal Léon Burrus	1,640
FC Brunnen	Schwyz	Wintersried	500
SC Buochs	Nidwalden	Stadion Seefeld	5,000
FC Concordia Basel	Basel-City	Stadion Rankhof	7,000
SR Delémont	Jura	La Blancherie	5,263
FC Ebikon	Lucerne	Risch	1,000
FC Emmenbrücke	Lucerne	Stadion Gersag	8,700
SC Kleinhüningen	Basel-City	Sportplatz Schorenmatte	300
SC Kriens	Lucerne	Stadion Kleinfeld	5,100
FC Laufen	Basel-Country	Sportplatz Nau	3,000
FC Porrentruy	Jura	Stade du Tirage	4,226
FC Solothurn	Solothurn	Stadion FC Solothurn	6,750
SC Zug	Zug	Herti Allmend Stadion	6,000

=== Final league table ===
Pos	Team	Pld	W	D	L	GF	GA	GD	Pts	Qualification or relegation
1	SC Kriens	24	11	10	3	43	22	+21	32	Play-off to Nationalliga B
2	FC Laufen	24	11	9	4	39	23	+16	31	Decider for play-off
3	SR Delémont	24	13	5	6	45	31	+14	31	Decider for play-off
4	FC Solothurn	24	12	5	7	39	25	+14	29	
5	US Boncourt	24	11	7	6	40	29	+11	29	
6	SC Buochs	24	9	7	8	41	39	+2	25	
7	FC Brunnen	24	8	6	10	32	31	+1	22	
8	SC Zug	24	10	2	12	34	38	−4	22	
9	FC Emmenbrücke	24	8	6	10	29	34	−5	22	
10	SC Kleinhüningen	24	7	8	9	34	46	−12	22	
11	FC Concordia Basel	24	6	9	9	31	38	−7	21	
12	FC Porrentruy	24	7	5	12	31	47	−16	19	Relegation to 2. Liga Interregional
13	FC Ebikon	24	1	5	18	22	57	−35	7	Relegation to 2. Liga Interregional

Source: RSSSF
Rules for classification: 1) Points; 2) Goal difference within the league, but decider play-off for qualifiers; 3) Goals scored; 4) Head-to-head points; 5) Away goals scored; 6) Draw.

=== Decider for second place ===
The decider match for second place was played on 1 June 1975 in Basel.

Team 1	Score	Team 2
SR Delémont	3–1	FC Laufen

SR Delémont win and advance to play-offs. FC Laufen remain in the division.

== Group South and East ==
=== Teams ===
Club	Canton	Stadium	Capacity
FC Baden	Aargau	Esp Stadium	7,000
FC Blue Stars Zürich	Zürich	Hardhof	1,000
SC Brühl	St. Gallen	Paul-Grüninger-Stadion	4,200
FC Chur	Grisons	Ringstrasse	2,820
FC Frauenfeld	Thurgau	Kleine Allmend	6,370
FC Gossau	St. Gallen	Sportanlage Buechenwald	3,500
FC Locarno	Locarno, Ticino	Stadio comunale Lido	5,000
FC Red Star Zürich	Zürich	Allmend Brunau	2,000
FC Schaffhausen	Schaffhausen	Stadion Breite	7,300
FC Tössfeld	Zürich	Talgut	1,000
FC Uzwil	St. Gallen	Rüti	1,000
FC Wil	St. Gallen	Sportpark Bergholz	6,048
FC Young Fellows Zürich	Zürich	Utogrund	2,850

=== Final league table ===
Pos	Team	Pld	W	D	L	GF	GA	GD	Pts	Qualification or relegation
1	FC Gossau	24	18	5	1	55	16	+39	41	Play-off to Nationalliga B
2	FC Young Fellows Zürich	24	17	3	4	69	31	+38	37	Play-off to Nationalliga B
3	FC Blue Stars Zürich	24	11	5	8	36	24	+12	27	
4	FC Chur	24	9	8	7	33	30	+3	26	
5	FC Frauenfeld	24	9	7	8	41	43	−2	25	
6	FC Baden	24	7	9	8	28	39	−11	23	
7	FC Locarno	24	6	10	8	26	26	0	22	
8	SC Brühl	24	7	7	10	35	31	+4	21	
9	FC Schaffhausen	24	7	7	10	38	39	−1	21	
10	FC Red Star Zürich	24	9	3	12	31	41	−10	21	
11	FC Tössfeld	24	9	3	12	25	38	−13	21	
12	FC Wil	24	5	8	11	28	43	−15	18	Relegation to 2. Liga Interregional
13	FC Uzwil	24	2	5	17	21	65	−44	9	Relegation to 2. Liga Interregional

Source: RSSSF
Rules for classification: 1) Points; 2) Goal difference within the league, but decider play-off for qualifiers; 3) Goals scored; 4) Head-to-head points; 5) Away goals scored; 6) Draw.

== Promotion play-off ==
The three group winners played a two legged tie against one of the runners-up to decide the three finalists. The games were played on 1, 5, 8 and 15 June.

=== First round ===
Team 1	Score	Team 2
FC Young Fellows Zürich	2–2	SC Kriens
SC Kriens	0–2	FC Young Fellows Zürich

FC Young Fellows Zürich win 4–2 on aggregate and continue to the finals.

Team 1	Score	Team 2
Central Fribourg	3–2	FC Gossau
FC Gossau	3–0	Central Fribourg

FC Gossau win 5–3 on aggregate and continue to the finals.

Team 1	Score	Team 2
SR Delémont	0–1	FC Bern
FC Bern	2–0	SR Delémont

FC Bern win 3–0 on aggregate and continue to the finals.

=== Final round ===
The three first round winners competed in a single round-robin to decide the two promotion slots. The games were played on 15, 22 and 29 June.

Pos	Team	Pld	W	D	L	GF	GA	GD	Pts	GOS	YFJ	BER
1	FC Gossau	2	1	1	0	6	2	+4	3	—	—	1–1
2	FC Young Fellows Zürich	2	1	0	1	2	5	−3	2	1–5	—	—
3	FC Bern	2	0	1	1	1	2	−1	1	—	0–1	—

Source: RSSSF

FC Gossau are 1. Liga champions, FC Young Fellows Zürich are runners-up and these two teams are promoted.

== Further in Swiss football ==
- 1974–75 Nationalliga A
- 1974–75 Nationalliga B
- 1974–75 Swiss Cup

== Sources ==
- Switzerland 1974–75 at RSSSF

Preceded by 1973–74	Seasons in Swiss 1. Liga	Succeeded by 1975–76
