= 1967–68 Swiss Cup =

Tournament details
- Country: Switzerland

Final positions
- Champions: Lugano
- Runners-up: Winterthur

The 1967–68 Swiss Cup was the 43rd season of Switzerland's football cup competition, organised annually since 1925–26 by the Swiss Football Association.

== Overview ==
This season's cup competition began on the weekend of 2 and 3 September 1967, with the games of the first round. The competition was to be completed on Easter Monday 15 April 1968 with the final, which was traditionally held at the former Wankdorf Stadium in Bern. The clubs from this season's Nationalliga B (NLB) were given byes for the first two rounds and entered the competition in the third round. The clubs from this season's Nationalliga A (NLA) were granted byes for the first three rounds. These teams joined the competition in the fourth round, which was played on the week-end of 12 and 13 November.

The matches were played in a knockout format. In the event of a draw after 90 minutes, the match went into extra time. In the event of a draw at the end of extra time, a replay was foreseen and this was played on the visiting team's pitch. If the replay ended in a draw after extra time, a toss of a coin would decide the outcome of the encounter. The cup winners qualified themselves for the first round of the Cup Winners' Cup in the next season.

== Round 1 ==
In this first phase, the lower league teams (1. Liga and lower) that had qualified themselves for the competition through their regional football association's regional cup competitions or their association's requirements, competed here. The draw respected local regionalities.

=== Summary ===
==== Region Ostschweiz/Zürich ====
Team 1	Score	Team 2
2 and 3 September 1967
FC Küsnacht	1–2 (a.e.t.)	FC Lachen
FC Widnau	3–1	FC Turicum
Red Star	3–2 (a.e.t.)	FC Oberwinterthur
FC Neuhausen	0–1	FC Amriswil
SC Zug	0–1	Frauenfeld
FC Adliswil	3–1	FC Wil
Uster	1–0 (a.e.t.)	Ballspielclub Zürich
Blue Stars	6–3	FC Oerlikon ZH
FC Industrie ZH	2–0	Schaffhausen
Gossau	1–4	Vaduz
SV Seebach ZH	3–2	Chur

==== Region Innerschweiz/Ticino ====
Team 1	Score	Team 2
2 and 3 September 1967
Emmenbrücke	3–0	Kickers Luzern
US Giubiasco	3–3	Mendrisiostar
FC Tresa	2–3 (a.e.t.)	Locarno
FC Mezzovicco	4–2	FC Bodio
FC Brunnen	2–1	Melano

Replay

Team 1	Score	Team 2
10 September 1967
Mendrisiostar	2–0	US Giubiasco

==== Region Zentalschweiz/Nord ====
Team 1	Score	Team 2
2 and 3 September 1967
Old Boys	1–3	Concordia
Courrendlin	0–4	FC Frenkendorf
Schöftland	0–0 (a.e.t.)	Nordstern
Wangen bei Olten	2–0	Alle
FC Allschwil	0–5	FC Pratteln
FC Trimbach	3–1	FC Schönenwerd
SC Zofingen	2–1	FC Langenthal
Menziken AG	1–2	FC Breite Basel
FC Porrentruy	3–1	FC Deitingen
Roggwil	3–4	FC Breitenbach

Replay

Team 1	Score	Team 2
10 September 1967
Nordstern	2–1 (a.e.t.)	Schöftland

==== Region Zentalschweiz/Süd ====
Team 1	Score	Team 2
2 and 3 September 1967
FC Selzach	3–1	FC Portalban
Cantonal Neuchâtel	4–4 (a.e.t.)	FC Le Locle
FC Fontainemelon	1–4	FC Bözingen 34
Corcelles/Cormondrèche	1–4	Central Fribourg
FC Fleurier	2–1	FC Saint-Imier
FC Couvet	1–1 (a.e.t.)	Minerva Bern
Minerva Bern	8–1	Täuffelen
Dürrenast	4–3	FC Interlaken
Aegerten-Brügg	1–2	Burgdorf

Replays

Team 1	Score	Team 2
9 September 1967
FC Le Locle	3–1	Cantonal Neuchâtel
10 September 1967
Minerva Bern	2–0	FC Couvet

==== Region Romande ====
Team 1	Score	Team 2
2 and 3 September 1967
Monthey	3–2	Martigny-Sports
FC Ecublens	2–2 (a.e.t.)	Le Mont
Etoile Carouge	1–2	FC Versoix
US Campagnes GE	5–3	Meyrin
Vevey Sports	2–1	ES Malley
Chênois	1–2	FC Raron
Forward Morges	3–1	FC Saint-Léonard
FC Lutry	4–6	FC Plan-les-Ouates
Stade Lausanne	1–3 (a.e.t.)	Yverdon-Sport

Replay

Team 1	Score	Team 2
10 September 1967
Le Mont	0–2	FC Ecublens

== Round 2 ==
=== Summary ===
Team 1	Score	Team 2
16 and 17 September 1967
FC Brunnen	1–3	Mendrisiostar
FC Mezzovicco	3–0	Locarno
Red Star	0–3	Emmenbrücke
FC Lachen	2–1	FC Industrie ZH
FC Adliswil	0–2	FC Amriswil
Blue Stars	2–0	Uster
SV Seebach ZH	2–2 (a.e.t.)	FC Widnau
Frauenfeld	2–3	Vaduz
FC Pratteln	0–3	FC Frenkendorf
Wangen bei Olten	2–4	FC Breite Basel
FC Porrentruy	5–2	FC Bözingen 34
FC Breitenbach	2–1	SC Zofingen
FC Selzach	2–4	Concordia
FC Trimbach	3–3 (a.e.t.)	Zähringia Bern
Dürrenast	1–0	Minerva Bern
Nordstern	0–2	Burgdorf
FC Raron	2–1	FC Versoix
FC Ecublens	2–6	Yverdon-Sport
FC Le Locle	5–1	US Campagnes GE
Forward Morges	0–3	Monthey
Central Fribourg	2–2 (a.e.t.)	Vevey Sports
FC Fleurier	0–3	FC Plan-les-Ouates

Replays

Team 1	Score	Team 2
24 September 1967
FC Widnau	6–3	SV Seebach ZH
Zähringia Bern	0–2	FC Trimbach
Vevey Sports	5–2 (a.e.t.)	Central Fribourg

== Round 3 ==
The teams from the NLB entered the cup competition in this round. However, they were seeded and could not be drawn against each other. Whenever possible, the draw respected local regionalities. The lower-tier team in each encounter was granted home advantage, if they so wished.

=== Summary ===
Team 1	Score	Team 2
30 September and 1 October 1967
Winterthur	10–1	Vaduz
St. Gallen	4–0	Blue Stars
Chiasso	0–1	Mendrisiostar
Bern	1–2 (a.e.t.)	FC Breitenbach
Fribourg	0–1	FC Le Locle
Xamax	2–1 (a.e.t.)	Monthey
Concordia	4–1	Baden
FC Porrentruy	4–5 (a.e.t.)	Solothurn
FC Raron	3–2	Moutier
Vevey Sports	2–0	Urania Genève Sport
Burgdorf	2–4	Aarau
Thun	2–0	FC Trimbach
Wettingen	1–1	FC Mezzovicco
FC Mezzovicco	2–1	Wettingen
Brühl	8–0	FC Frenkendorf
FC Widnau	0–1	FC Amriswil
Yverdon-Sport	3–0	FC Plan-les-Ouates
FC Lachen	1–4	Emmenbrücke
FC Breite Basel	2–2	Dürrenast

Replays

Team 1	Score	Team 2
11 October 1967
FC Mezzovicco	2–1	Wettingen
29 October 1967
Dürrenast	3–1	FC Breite Basel

=== Matches ===
1 October 1967

Burgdorf	2–4	Aarau
Goal	FCA summary	Goal

Stadion Neumatt, Burgdorf
Referee: (Switzerland)

== Round 4 ==
The teams from the NLA entered the cup competition in the fourth round, they were seeded and could not be drawn against each other. The draw was still respecting regionalities, but the lower-tier team was not automatically granted home advantage.

=== Summary ===
Team 1	Score	Team 2
12 November 1967
FC Mezzovicco	0–6	Zürich
Basel	2–1 (a.e.t.)	FC Le Locle
Servette	5–1	FC Raron
Mendrisiostar	0–2	Bellinzona
Biel-Bienne	4–3	Vevey Sports
Yverdon-Sport	0–0 (a.e.t.)	La Chaux-de-Fonds
Emmenbrücke	2–3	Young Boys
Concordia	1–5	Sion
Thun	2–1 (a.e.t.)	Grenchen
Young Fellows	2–1	Solothurn
Xamax	4–2	Lausanne-Sport
Winterthur	3–0	FC Amriswil
Brühl	P–P	Luzern
Dürrenast	1–0	FC Breitenbach
St. Gallen	2–1	Grasshopper Club
Aarau	2–2 (a.e.t.)	Lugano

Replays

Team 1	Score	Team 2
21 November 1967
Lugano	3–1	Aarau
22 November 1967
La Chaux-de-Fonds	6–0	Yverdon-Sport
Luzern	5–1	Brühl

=== Matches ===
12 November 1967

FC Mezzovicco	0–6	Zürich
	FCZ summary	3' (0:1) Künzli; 14' (0:2) Kuhn; 32' (0:3) Künzli; 44' (0:4) Kuhn; 83' (0:5) Künzli; 88' (0:6) Künzli

Cornaredo Stadium, Lugano
Attendance: 5,000
Referee: (Switzerland) Othmar Huber (Thun)

12 November 1967
15:15

Basel	2 – 1 (a.e.t.)	Le Locle-Sports
Frigerio 83' (1:1); Benthaus 108' (2:1)	FCB summary	49' (0:1) Bosset

St. Jakob-Park, Basel
Attendance: 9,300
Referee: (Switzerland) W. Hardmeier (Thalwil)

12 November 1967

Servette	5–1	FC Raron
Pottier; Heuri; Guyot; Mocellin; Németh	Servette summary	Goal

Stade des Charmilles, Geneva
Referee: (Switzerland)

12 November 1967

Aarau	2–2 (a.e.t.)	Lugano
Goal	FCA summary	Goal

Stadion Brügglifeld, Aarau
Attendance: 13,000 (sold-out)
Referee: (Switzerland)

21 November 1967

Lugano	3–1	Aarau
Goal	FCA summary	Goal

Cornaredo Stadium, Lugano
Referee: (Switzerland)

== Round 5 ==
=== Summary ===
Team 1	Score	Team 2
10 December 1967
Zürich	1–0	Basel
Servette	1–0	Bellinzona
Biel-Bienne	3–0	La Chaux-de-Fonds
Young Boys	0–2	Sion
Thun	0–1 (a.e.t.)	Young Fellows
Neuchâtel Xamax	4–5 (a.e.t.)	Winterthur
Luzern	7–1	Dürrenast
St. Gallen	1–2	Lugano

=== Matches ===
10 December 1967

Servette	1–0	Bellinzona
Sundermann (1:0)	Servette summary

Stade des Charmilles, Geneva

10 December 1967
14:30

Zürich	1–0	Basel
Meyer 52' (1:0)	FCZ summary FCB summary

Letzigrund, Zürich
Attendance: 15,500
Referee: (Switzerland) Gilbert Droz (Marin)

== Quarter-finals ==
=== Summary ===
Team 1	Score	Team 2
24 February 1968
Lugano	1–0	Zürich
25 February 1968
Biel-Bienne	1–0	Servette
Sion	2–2 (a.e.t.)	Luzern
Winterthur	2–1	Young Fellows

Replay

Team 1	Score	Team 2
28 February 1968
Luzern	4–0	Sion

=== Matches ===
24 February 1968

Lugano	1–0	Zürich
Pullica (yellow card) 22'; Luttrop 30' (1:0); Moscatelli (yellow card) 45'	FCZ summary	(yellow card) 22' Künzli

Cornaredo Stadium, Lugano
Attendance: 13,000
Referee: (Switzerland) Gilbert Droz (Marin)

25 February 1968

Biel-Bienne	1–0	Servette
Goal	Servette summary

Stadion Gurzelen, Biel/Bienne

== Semi-finals ==
=== Summary ===
Team 1	Score	Team 2
17 March 1968
Luzern	2–4 (a.e.t.)	Lugano
Winterthur	2–1	Biel-Bienne

=== Matches ===
17 March 1968

Luzern	2–4 (a.e.t.)	Lugano
Wechselberger 43' (1:1); Richter 67' (2:2)	[ summary]	37' (0:1) Luttrop; 59' (1:2) Simonetti; 109' (2:3) Simonetti; 116' (2:4) Brenna

Stadion Allmend, Lucerne

17 March 1968

Winterthur	2–1	Biel-Bienne
Rutschmann 22' (1:0); Odermatt 51' (2:1)	[ summary]	24' (1:1) Peters

Schützenwiese, Winterthur

== Final ==
The final was held at the former Wankdorf Stadium in Bern on Easter Monday 1968. FC Winterthur reached the final as a club from the second tier (NLB).

=== Summary ===
Team 1	Score	Team 2
15 April 1968
Lugano	2–1	Winterthur

=== Telegram ===
15 April 1968
15:00

Lugano	2–1	Winterthur
Luttrop 11' (1:0); Simonetti 77' (2:1)	Fussball-Schweiz summary	46' (1:1) Dimmeler

Wankdorf Stadium, Bern
Attendance: 34,000
Referee: (Switzerland) Mario Clematide (Zollikofen)

Lugano won the cup and this was the club's second cup title to this date.

== Further in Swiss football ==
- 1967–68 Nationalliga A
- 1967–68 Swiss 1. Liga

== Sources ==
- Fussball-Schweiz
- FCB Cup games 1967–68 at fcb-achiv.ch
- Switzerland 1967–68 at RSSSF

Preceded by 1966–67	Swiss Cup seasons	Succeeded by 1968–69
