= Jan Andersen =

Danish footballer (born 1945)

Personal information
- Date of birth: 17 June 1945 (age 81)
- Place of birth: Østerbro, Denmark
- Height: 1.79 m (5 ft 10 in)
- Position: Midfielder

Senior career*
Years	Team	Apps	(Gls)
1965–1970	B 1903		
1971–1973	FC Fribourg		
1973–1978	Young Boys		
1979	Ballerup IF		

International career
1969–1970	Denmark	8	(0)
- * Club domestic league appearances and goals

Jan Andersen (born 17 June 1945) is a Danish former professional footballer who played as a midfielder. He made eight appearances for the Denmark national team from 1969 to 1970.
