= 1968–69 Swiss 1. Liga =

1. Liga
- Season: 1968–69
- Champions: 1. Liga champions: FC Martigny-Sports; Group West: FC Martigny-Sports; Group Cenral: FC Langenthal; Group South and East: FC Frauenfeld
- Promoted: FC Martigny-Sports; FC Langenthal
- Relegated: Group West: FC Fontainemelon; FC Stade Lausanne; Group Central: FC Trimbach; BSC Old Boys; Group South and East: FC Blue Stars Zürich; FC Schaffhausen
- Matches: 3 times 156 and 4 deciders plus 12 play-offs

The 1968–69 1. Liga season was the 37th season of the 1. Liga since its creation in 1931. At this time, the 1. Liga was the third tier of the Swiss football league system and it was the highest level of amateur football.

== Format ==
There were 39 teams competing in the 1. Liga 1968–69 season. They were divided into three regional groups, each group with 13 teams. Within each group, the teams would play a double round-robin to decide their league position. Two points were awarded for a win. The three group winners and the three runners-up then contested a play-off round to decide the two promotion slots. The last two placed teams in each group were relegated to the 2. Liga (fourth tier).

== Group West ==
=== Teams ===
Club	Based in	Canton	Stadium	Capacity
US Campagnes GE	Geneva	Geneva		
FC Cantonal Neuchâtel	Neuchâtel	Neuchâtel	Stade de la Maladière	25,500
CS Chênois	Thônex	Geneva	Stade des Trois-Chêne	8,000
FC Fontainemelon	Neuchâtel	Neuchâtel	Centre Sportif Fontainemelon	1,000
FC Le Locle	Le Locle	Neuchâtel	Installation sportive - Jeanneret	3,142
FC Martigny-Sports	Martigny	Valais	Stade d'Octodure	2,500
FC Meyrin	Meyrin	Geneva	Stade des Arbères	9,000
FC Monthey	Monthey	Valais	Stade Philippe Pottier	1,800
FC Moutier	Moutier	Bern	Stade de Chalière	5,000
FC Stade Lausanne	Ouchy, Lausanne	Vaud	Centre sportif de Vidy	1,000
FC Stade Nyonnais	Nyon	Vaud	Stade de Colovray	7,200
Vevey Sports	Vevey	Vaud	Stade de Copet	4,000
Yverdon-Sport FC	Yverdon-les-Bains	Vaud	Stade Municipal	6,600

=== Final league table ===
Pos	Team	Pld	W	D	L	GF	GA	GD	Pts	Qualification or relegation
1	FC Martigny-Sports	24	18	2	4	57	25	+32	38	To play-off to Nationalliga B
2	FC Monthey	24	16	5	3	58	24	+34	37	Decider for second position
3	Vevey-Sports	24	16	5	3	49	18	+31	37	Decider for second position
4	FC Cantonal Neuchâtel	24	10	6	8	36	37	−1	26	
5	US Campagnes GE	24	8	8	8	29	30	−1	24	
6	FC Le Locle	24	9	4	11	53	43	+10	22	
7	Yverdon-Sport FC	24	8	5	11	35	38	−3	21	
8	FC Moutier	24	6	7	11	34	49	−15	19	
9	FC Meyrin	24	5	9	10	26	43	−17	19	
10	CS Chênois	24	6	6	12	26	38	−12	18	
11	FC Fontainemelon	24	7	3	14	32	47	−15	17	Play-out against relegation
12	FC Stade Nyonnais	24	8	1	15	26	46	−20	17	Play-out against relegation
13	FC Stade Lausanne	24	7	3	14	35	58	−23	17	Play-out against relegation

Source: RSSSF
Rules for classification: 1) Points; 2) Goal difference within the league, but decider play-off for qualifiers; 3) Goals scored; 4) Head-to-head points; 5) Away goals scored; 6) Draw.

=== Decider for second place ===
The decider match for second place was played on 2 June 1969 in Martigny

Team 1	Score	Team 2
FC Monthey	2–0	Vevey-Sports

FC Monthey won and advanced to play-offs. Vevey-Sports remain in the division.

=== Play-out against relegation ===
Team 1	Score	Team 2
FC Stade Nyonnais	3–0	FC Fontainemelon
FC Stade Lausanne	1–3	FC Stade Nyonnais
FC Fontainemelon	n/p	FC Stade Lausanne

FC Stade Nyonnais won remain in the division. The match Fontainemelon against Lausanne was not played. Both teams were relegated to 2. Liga Interregional.

== Group Central ==
=== Teams ===
Club	Based in	Canton	Stadium	Capacity
FC Bern	Bern	Bern	Stadion Neufeld	14,000
FC Breite Basel	Basel	Basel-Stadt	Stadion Schützenmatte / Landhof	8,000 / 7,000
FC Breitenbach	Breitenbach	Solothurn	Grien	2,000
SC Burgdorf	Burgdorf	Bern	Stadion Neumatt	3,850
FC Concordia Basel	Basel	Basel-Stadt	Stadion Rankhof	7,000
FC Dürrenast	Thun	Bern	Stadion Lachen	13,500
FC Langenthal	Langenthal	Bern	Rankmatte	2,000
FC Minerva Bern	Bern	Bern	Spitalacker	1,450
FC Nordstern Basel	Basel	Basel-Stadt	Rankhof	7,600
BSC Old Boys	Basel	Basel-Stadt	Stadion Schützenmatte	8,000
FC Porrentruy	Porrentruy	Jura	Stade du Tirage	4,226
FC Trimbach|	Trimbach	Solothurn	Sportanlage Leinfeld	400
SC Zofingen	Zofingen	Aargau	Sportanlagen Trinermatten	2,000

=== Final league table ===
Pos	Team	Pld	W	D	L	GF	GA	GD	Pts	Qualification or relegation
1	FC Langenthal	24	15	4	5	44	29	+15	34	Play-off to Nationalliga B
2	FC Bern	24	13	5	6	43	30	+13	31	Play-off to Nationalliga B
3	FC Nordstern Basel	24	12	6	6	49	49	0	30	
4	FC Concordia Basel	24	11	5	8	40	39	+1	27	
5	SC Burgdorf	24	10	5	9	44	39	+5	25	
6	FC Minerva Bern	24	9	6	9	36	29	+7	24	
7	FC Breitenbach	24	10	3	11	39	42	−3	23	
8	FC Porrentruy	24	9	4	11	40	31	+9	22	
9	FC Dürrenast	24	10	2	12	39	39	0	22	
10	SC Zofingen	24	9	3	12	38	42	−4	21	
11	FC Breite Basel	24	6	9	9	28	41	−13	21	
12	FC Trimbach	24	6	6	12	24	32	−8	18	Relegation to 2. Liga Interregional
13	BSC Old Boys	24	4	6	14	27	49	−22	14	Relegation to 2. Liga Interregional

Source: RSSSF
Rules for classification: 1) Points; 2) Goal difference within the league, but decider play-off for qualifiers; 3) Goals scored; 4) Head-to-head points; 5) Away goals scored; 6) Draw.

== Group South and East ==
=== Teams ===
Club	Based in	Canton	Stadium	Capacity
FC Amriswil	Amriswil	Thurgau	Tellenfeld	1,000
FC Blue Stars Zürich	Zürich	Zürich	Hardhof	1,000
SC Buochs	Buochs	Nidwalden	Stadion Seefeld	5,000
FC Emmenbrücke	Emmen	Lucerne	Stadion Gersag	8,700
FC Frauenfeld	Frauenfeld	Thurgau	Kleine Allmend	6,370
FC Küsnacht	Küsnacht	Zürich	Sportanlage Heslibach	2,300
FC Locarno	Locarno	Ticino	Stadio comunale Lido	5,000
FC Oerlikon/Polizei ZH	Oerlikon (Zürich)	Zürich	Sportanlage Neudorf	1,000
FC Red Star Zürich	Zürich	Zürich	Allmend Brunau	2,000
FC Schaffhausen	Schaffhausen	Schaffhausen	Stadion Breite	7,300
FC Uster|	Uster	Zürich	Sportanlage Buchholz	7,000
FC Vaduz	Vaduz	Liechtenstein	Rheinpark Stadion	7,584
SC Zug	Zug	Zug	Herti Allmend Stadion	6,000

=== Final league table ===
Pos	Team	Pld	W	D	L	GF	GA	GD	Pts	Qualification or relegation
1	FC Frauenfeld	24	14	5	5	44	27	+17	33	Play-off to Nationalliga B
2	SC Buochs	24	14	4	6	54	30	+24	32	Play-off to Nationalliga B
3	FC Amriswil	24	11	8	5	42	30	+12	30	
4	FC Red Star Zürich	24	11	5	8	32	28	+4	27	
5	FC Locarno	24	12	1	11	41	31	+10	25	
6	FC Küsnacht	24	8	8	8	28	27	+1	24	
7	SC Zug	24	8	8	8	28	30	−2	24	
8	FC Emmenbrücke	24	9	4	11	34	43	−9	22	
9	FC Uster	24	4	13	7	25	29	−4	21	
10	FC Vaduz	24	8	5	11	28	35	−7	21	
11	FC Oerlikon/Polizei ZH	24	9	2	13	37	39	−2	20	
12	FC Blue Stars Zürich	24	5	7	12	23	44	−21	17	Relegation to 2. Liga Interregional
13	FC Schaffhausen	24	4	8	12	26	49	−23	16	Relegation to 2. Liga Interregional

Source: RSSSF
Rules for classification: 1) Points; 2) Goal difference within the league, but decider play-off for qualifiers; 3) Goals scored; 4) Head-to-head points; 5) Away goals scored; 6) Draw.

== Promotion play-off ==
The three group winners played a two legged tie against one of the runners-up to decide the three finalists. The games were played on 8 and 15 June 1969.

=== Qualification round ===
Team 1	Score	Team 2
FC Martigny-Sports	2–1	SC Buochs
SC Buochs	1–1	FC Martigny-Sports

FC Martigny-Sports won 3–2 on aggregate and continued to the finals.

Team 1	Score	Team 2
FC Langenthal	2–0	FC Monthey
FC Monthey	3–1	FC Langenthal

3–3 on aggregate. Both teams continued to the finals.

Team 1	Score	Team 2
FC Frauenfeld	1–1	FC Bern
FC Bern	0–1	FC Frauenfeld

FC Frauenfeld win 2–1 on aggregate and continued to the finals.

=== Final round ===
The finals were played on 22 and 29 June 1969.

Team 1	Score	Team 2
FC Martigny-Sports	3–0	FC Monthey
FC Monthey	1–0	FC Martigny-Sports

FC Martigny-Sports win 3–1 on aggregate, are declaired as 1. champions and are promoted to 1969–70 Nationalliga B.

Team 1	Score	Team 2
FC Langenthal	4–0	FC Frauenfeld
FC Frauenfeld	3–1	FC Langenthal

FC Langenthal win 5–3 on aggregate and are promoted to 1969–70 Nationalliga B.

== Further in Swiss football ==
- 1968–69 Nationalliga A
- 1968–69 Nationalliga B
- 1968–69 Swiss Cup

== Sources ==
- Switzerland 1968–69 at RSSSF

Preceded by 1967–68	Seasons in Swiss 1. Liga	Succeeded by 1969–70
