= 1967–68 Nationalliga A =

Swiss football season

Nationalliga A
- Season: 1967–68
- Champions: Zürich
- Relegated: Young Fellows; Grenchen
- Top goalscorer: Fritz Künzli (Zürich); 28 goals

Nationalliga B
- Season: 1967–68
- Champions: Winterthur
- Promoted: Winterthur; St. Gallen
- Relegated: Moutier; Bern
- Top goalscorer: Timo Konietzka (Winterthur); 34 goals

The following is the summary of the Swiss National League in the 1967–68 football season, both Nationalliga A and Nationalliga B. This was the 71st season of top-tier and the 70th season of second-tier football in Switzerland.

== Overview ==
The Swiss Football Association (ASF/SFV) had 28 member clubs at this time which were divided into two divisions of 14 teams each. The teams played a double round-robin to decide their table positions. Two points were awarded for a win and one point was awarded for a draw. The top tier (NLA) was contested by the top 12 teams from the previous 1966–67 season and the two newly promoted teams FC Luzern and AC Bellinzona. The champions would qualify for the 1968–69 European Cup and the last two teams in the league table at the end of the season were to be relegated.

The second-tier (NLB) was contested by the two teams that had been relegated from the NLA, FC Winterthur and FC Moutier, the ten teams that had been in third to twelfth position last season and the two newly promoted teams FC Bern and FC Fribourg. The top two teams at the end of the season would be promoted to the 1968–69 NLA and the two last placed teams would be relegated to the 1968–69 Swiss 1. Liga.

== Nationalliga A ==
The first round of the NLA was played on 19 August 1957. After playing 13 rounds, completed on 3 December, there was a winter break until the 14th round was held on 3 March 1968. The season had 26 rounds and was completed on 9 June 1968.

=== Teams, locations ===
Team	Based in	Canton	Stadium	Capacity
FC Basel	Basel	Basel-Stadt	St. Jakob Stadium	36,800
AC Bellinzona	Bellinzona	Ticino	Stadio Comunale Bellinzona	5,000
FC Biel-Bienne	Biel/Bienne	Bern	Stadion Gurzelen	15,000
Grasshopper Club Zürich	Zürich	Zürich	Hardturm	20,000
FC Grenchen	Grenchen	Solothurn	Stadium Brühl	15,100
FC La Chaux-de-Fonds	La Chaux-de-Fonds	Neuchâtel	Centre Sportif de la Charrière	12,700
FC Lausanne-Sport	Lausanne	Vaud	Pontaise	15,700
FC Lugano	Lugano	Ticino	Cornaredo Stadium	6,330
FC Luzern	Lucerne	Lucerne	Stadion Allmend	25,000
Servette FC	Geneva	Geneva	Stade des Charmilles	27,000
FC Sion	Sion	Valais	Stade de Tourbillon	16,000
BSC Young Boys	Bern	Bern	Wankdorf Stadium	56,000
FC Young Fellows Zürich	Zürich	Zürich	Utogrund	2,850
FC Zürich	Zürich	Zürich	Letzigrund	25,000

=== Final league table ===
Pos	Team	Pld	W	D	L	GF	GA	GD	Pts	Qualification or relegation
1	Zürich	26	16	6	4	63	27	+36	38	To championship play-off
2	Grasshopper Club	26	17	4	5	54	23	+31	38	To championship play-off
3	Lugano	26	17	4	5	53	30	+23	38	To championship play-off
4	Lausanne-Sport	26	13	6	7	67	43	+24	32	Entered in 1968-69 Inter-Cities Fairs Cup
5	Basel	26	13	5	8	49	33	+16	31	Entered in 1968-69 Inter-Cities Fairs Cup
6	Luzern	26	12	4	10	51	58	−7	28	
7	Biel-Bienne	26	10	5	11	43	45	−2	25	Entered 1968 Intertoto Cup
8	Young Boys	26	9	7	10	37	43	−6	25	
9	Sion	26	7	10	9	31	41	−10	24	
10	La Chaux-de-Fonds	26	8	6	12	40	49	−9	22	Entered 1968 Intertoto Cup
11	Servette	26	8	5	13	40	42	−2	21	
12	Bellinzona	26	8	5	13	26	40	−14	21	Entered 1968 Intertoto Cup
13	Young Fellows	26	3	6	17	21	58	−37	12	Relegated to Nationalliga B
14	Grenchen	26	3	3	20	19	62	−43	9	Relegated to Nationalliga B

Source: rsssf.com
Rules for classification: 1) Points; 2) Goal difference within the league, however with play-off for qualifiers;

=== Results ===
Home \ Away	BAS	BEL	BB	CDF	GCZ	GRE	LS	LUG	LUZ	SER	SIO	YB	YFZ	ZÜR
Basel		1–0	4–0	3–1	0–1	3–1	2–0	1–1	3–0	1–0	2–2	4–0	1–0	1–2
Bellinzona	0–0		2–2	0–2	1–0	2–2	3–1	0–2	1–0	2–0	1–0	0–1	0–2	0–0
Biel-Bienne	4–1	2–0		5–2	1–3	3–0	2–1	0–2	3–3	1–1	2–1	0–2	1–0	0–2
La Chaux-de-Fonds	3–2	3–0	1–1		0–0	2–0	3–1	1–2	1–4	3–1	1–1	1–3	2–1	1–1
Grasshopper Club	1–1	4–5	4–1	1–0		2–0	5–2	2–0	2–1	2–1	2–1	4–0	1–2	3–0
Grenchen	0–1	2–0	1–2	1–1	0–3		0–7	0–3	4–2	1–0	0–2	0–3	0–0	0–4
Lausanne-Sports	3–1	3–2	2–1	3–2	0–2	2–0		4–2	5–1	2–2	3–0	2–2	7–0	4–1
Lugano	4–2	3–1	1–0	3–1	1–1	4–2	3–1		6–1	1–0	2–2	2–1	1–0	0–1
Luzern	4–2	0–1	2–1	4–2	2–1	1–0	1–4	3–3		3–2	3–0	2–1	4–2	4–0
Servette	0–3	2–1	2–1	4–1	0–2	4–0	3–3	0–1	3–4		2–1	2–0	3–0	2–3
Sion	0–0	2–0	1–3	2–2	2–2	1–0	0–0	2–0	1–0	2–2		2–1	1–1	0–6
Young Boys	3–2	2–3	3–2	3–0	0–3	2–1	2–4	0–3	1–1	1–1	2–2		3–1	1–1
Young Fellows	2–4	1–1	2–3	0–3	1–3	3–2	1–1	1–3	1–1	0–3	0–3	0–0		0–4
Zürich	1–4	3–0	2–2	3–1	1–0	5–2	2–2	3–0	8–0	3–0	4–0	0–0	3–0	

Source: rsssf.com
Legend: Blue = home team win; Yellow = draw; Red = away team win.

=== Championship play-off ===
Three teams finished level on points, therefore a play-off was required. The game GC-Zürich was played on 12 June in Bern, Lugano-GC on 19 June in Lausanne and Zürich-Lugano on 26 June in Zürich with the acceptation of Lugano. Before this final match it was already clear that FCZ were Swiss champions, as a win for Lugano would have left all three play-off finalists equal on the same number of points. In this case the goal difference from the regular championship was decisive. The match was therefore moved from Lausanne to Zurich. After the match, the trophy was presented by Federal Councillor Nello Celio under difficult conditions following a pitch invasion by fans.

Pos	Team	Pld	W	D	L	GF	GA	GD	Pts	Qualification	FCZ	GC	LUG
1	Zürich	2	2	0	0	4	0	+4	4	Swiss Champions, qualified for 1968–69 European Cup	—	—	2–0
2	Grasshopper Club	2	1	0	1	2	3	−1	2	qualified for 1968–69 Inter-Cities Fairs Cup	0–2	—	—–
3	Lugano	2	0	0	2	1	4	−3	0	Swiss Cup winners, qualified for 1968–69 Cup Winners' Cup and entered 1968 Intertoto Cup	—	1–2	—

Source: rsssf.com
Rules for classification: 1) Points; 2) Goal difference regular season.

== Nationalliga B ==
=== Teams, locations ===
Team	Based in	Canton	Stadium	Capacity
FC Aarau	Aarau	Aargau	Stadion Brügglifeld	9,240
FC Baden	Baden	Aargau	Esp Stadium	7,000
FC Bern	Bern	Bern	Stadion Neufeld	14,000
SC Brühl	St. Gallen	St. Gallen	Paul-Grüninger-Stadion	4,200
FC Chiasso	Chiasso	Ticino	Stadio Comunale Riva IV	4,000
FC Fribourg	Fribourg	Fribourg	Stade Universitaire	9,000
FC Moutier	Moutier	Bern	Stade de Chalière	5,000
FC Solothurn	Solothurn	Solothurn	Stadion FC Solothurn	6,750
FC St. Gallen	St. Gallen	St. Gallen	Espenmoos	11,000
FC Thun	Thun	Bern	Stadion Lachen	10,350
Urania Genève Sport	Genève	Geneva	Stade de Frontenex	4,000
FC Wettingen	Wettingen	Aargau	Stadion Altenburg	10,000
FC Winterthur	Winterthur	Zürich	Schützenwiese	8,550
FC Xamax	Neuchâtel	Neuchâtel	Stade de la Maladière	25,500

=== Final league table ===
Pos	Team	Pld	W	D	L	GF	GA	GD	Pts	Qualification or relegation
1	FC Winterthur	26	18	4	4	70	27	+43	40	NLB Champions and promoted to 1968–69 Nationalliga A
2	FC St. Gallen	26	12	9	5	61	34	+27	33	Promoted to 1968–69 Nationalliga A
3	FC Aarau	26	11	9	6	50	26	+24	31	
4	FC Xamax	26	12	6	8	52	43	+9	30	
5	FC Chiasso	26	11	7	8	33	29	+4	29	
6	FC Wettingen	26	10	8	8	51	47	+4	28	
7	SC Brühl	26	11	6	9	46	44	+2	28	
8	FC Thun	26	9	9	8	40	37	+3	27	
9	Urania Genève Sport	26	10	7	9	46	47	−1	27	
10	FC Solothurn	26	8	7	11	44	52	−8	23	
11	FC Fribourg	26	6	9	11	35	36	−1	21	
12	FC Baden	26	7	7	12	27	56	−29	21	
13	FC Moutier	26	6	4	16	38	74	−36	16	Relegated to 1968–69 1. Liga
14	FC Bern	26	3	4	19	34	75	−41	10	Relegated to 1968–69 1. Liga

Source: rsssf.com
Rules for classification: 1) Points; 2) Goal difference within the league, however with play-off for qualifiers;

== Further in Swiss football ==
- 1967–68 Swiss Cup
- 1967–68 Swiss 1. Liga

== Sources ==
- Switzerland 1967–68 at RSSSF

Preceded by 1966–67	Nationalliga seasons in Switzerland	Succeeded by 1968–69
