= Philippe Pottier (footballer) =

Swiss footballer (1938–1985)

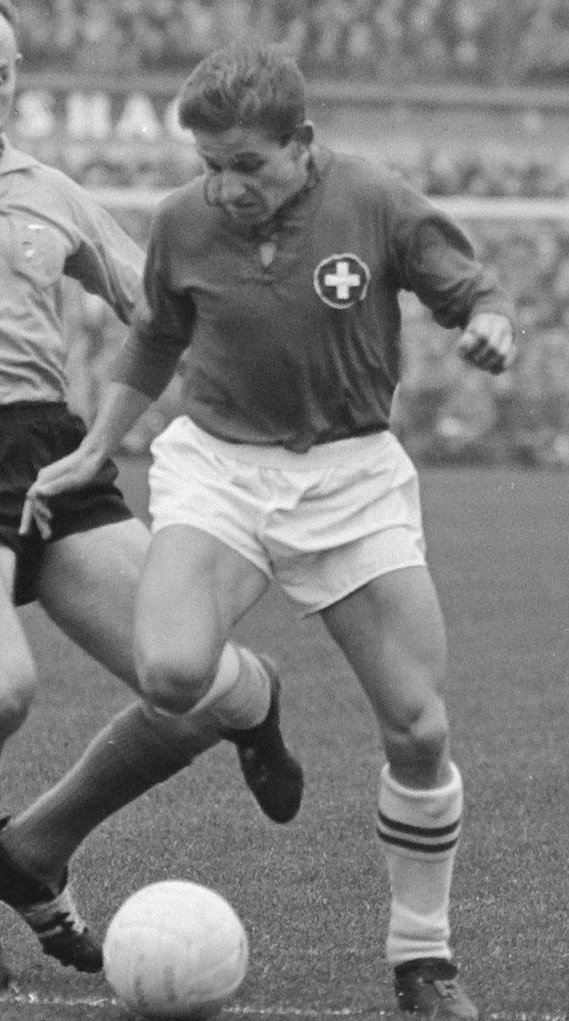

Personal information
- Date of birth: 9 July 1938
- Place of birth: Monthey, Switzerland
- Date of death: 22 September 1985 (aged 47)
- Position: Midfielder

Senior career*
Years	Team	Apps	(Gls)
1956–1961	FC La Chaux-de-Fonds		
1961–1966	Stade Français		
1966–1967	Angers SCO		
1967–1971	Servette FC		
1971–1973	Étoile Carouge		

International career
	Switzerland	16	(1)

Managerial career
- 1973–1976: Étoile Carouge
- * Club domestic league appearances and goals

Philippe Pottier (9 July 1938 – 22 September 1985) was a Swiss footballer who played as a midfielder.
