= 1968–69 Nationalliga A =

Swiss football season

Nationalliga A
- Season: 1968–69
- Champions: Basel
- Relegated: Sion; Luzern
- Top goalscorer: Hans-Otto Peters (Biel-Bienne); 24 goals

Nationalliga B
- Season: 1968–69
- Champions: Wettingen
- Promoted: Wettingen; Fribourg
- Relegated: Baden; Solothurn
- Top goalscorer: Karl Messerli (SC Brühl); 16 goals

The following is the summary of the Swiss National League in the 1968–69 football season, both Nationalliga A and Nationalliga B. This was the 72nd season of top-tier and the 71st season of second-tier football in Switzerland.

== Overview ==
The Swiss Football Association (ASF/SFV) had 28 member clubs at this time which were divided into two divisions of 14 teams each. The teams played a double round-robin to decide their table positions. Two points were awarded for a win and one point was awarded for a draw. The top tier (NLA) was contested by the top 12 teams from the previous 1967–68 season and the two newly promoted teams FC Winterthur and FC St. Gallen. The champions would qualify for the 1969–70 European Cup and the last two teams in the league table at the end of the season were to be relegated.

The second-tier (NLB) was contested by the two teams that had been relegated from the NLA, Young Fellows and FC Grenchen, the teams that had been in third to twelfth position last season and the two newly promoted teams Mendrisiostar and Etoile Carouge FC. The top two teams at the end of the season would be promoted to the 1969–70 NLA and the two last placed teams would be relegated to the 1969–70 Swiss 1. Liga.

== Nationalliga A ==
=== Teams, locations ===
| Team | Based in | Canton | Stadium | Capacity |
|---|---|---|---|---|
| FC Basel | Basel | Basel-Stadt | St. Jakob Stadium | 36,800 |
| AC Bellinzona | Bellinzona | Ticino | Stadio Comunale Bellinzona | 5,000 |
| FC Biel-Bienne | Biel/Bienne | Bern | Stadion Gurzelen | 15,000 |
| Grasshopper Club Zürich | Zürich | Zürich | Hardturm | 20,000 |
| FC La Chaux-de-Fonds | La Chaux-de-Fonds | Neuchâtel | Centre Sportif de la Charrière | 12,700 |
| FC Lausanne-Sport | Lausanne | Vaud | Pontaise | 15,700 |
| FC Lugano | Lugano | Ticino | Cornaredo Stadium | 6,330 |
| FC Luzern | Lucerne | Lucerne | Stadion Allmend | 25,000 |
| Servette FC | Geneva | Geneva | Stade des Charmilles | 27,000 |
| FC Sion | Sion | Valais | Stade de Tourbillon | 16,000 |
| FC St. Gallen | St. Gallen | St. Gallen | Espenmoos | 11,000 |
| FC Winterthur | Winterthur | Zürich | Schützenwiese | 8,550 |
| BSC Young Boys | Bern | Bern | Wankdorf Stadium | 56,000 |
| FC Zürich | Zürich | Zürich | Letzigrund | 25,000 |

=== Final league table ===
| Pos | Team | Pld | W | D | L | GF | GA | GD | Pts | Qualification |
|---|---|---|---|---|---|---|---|---|---|---|
| 1 | Basel | 26 | 13 | 10 | 3 | 48 | 28 | +20 | 36 | Swiss Champions, qualified for 1969–70 European Cup |
| 2 | Lausanne-Sport | 26 | 15 | 5 | 6 | 70 | 43 | +27 | 35 | Entered 1969-70 Inter-Cities Fairs Cup |
| 3 | Zürich | 26 | 12 | 6 | 8 | 61 | 37 | +24 | 30 | Entered 1969-70 Inter-Cities Fairs Cup |
| 4 | Young Boys | 26 | 12 | 6 | 8 | 49 | 36 | +13 | 30 | |
| 5 | Lugano | 26 | 11 | 7 | 8 | 37 | 26 | +11 | 29 | |
| 6 | Bellinzona | 26 | 10 | 8 | 8 | 38 | 41 | −3 | 28 | Entered 1969 Intertoto Cup |
| 7 | Biel-Bienne | 26 | 9 | 8 | 9 | 52 | 59 | −7 | 26 | |
| 8 | Servette | 26 | 9 | 7 | 10 | 32 | 39 | −7 | 25 | Entered 1969 Intertoto Cup |
| 9 | Grasshopper Club | 26 | 7 | 9 | 10 | 43 | 47 | −4 | 23 | |
| 10 | St. Gallen | 26 | 6 | 11 | 9 | 29 | 37 | −8 | 23 | Swiss Cup winners, qualified for 1969–70 Cup Winners' Cup |
| 11 | Winterthur | 26 | 5 | 12 | 9 | 28 | 43 | −15 | 22 | |
| 12 | La Chaux-de-Fonds | 26 | 5 | 11 | 10 | 51 | 53 | −2 | 21 | Entered 1969 Intertoto Cup |
| 13 | Sion | 26 | 7 | 6 | 13 | 39 | 52 | −13 | 20 | Relegated to 1969–70 Nationalliga B |
| 14 | Luzern | 26 | 6 | 4 | 16 | 35 | 71 | −36 | 16 | Relegated to 1969–70 Nationalliga B |

Source: rsssf.com
Rules for classification: 1) Points; 2) Goal difference within the league, however with play-off for qualifiers;

=== Results ===
| Home \ Away | BAS | BEL | BB | CDF | GCZ | LS | LUG | LUZ | SER | SIO | STG | WIN | YB | ZÜR |
|---|---|---|---|---|---|---|---|---|---|---|---|---|---|---|
| Basel | | 1–1 | 4–2 | 5–0 | 1–1 | 4–0 | 3–0 | 2–1 | 2–1 | 2–2 | 3–2 | 1–1 | 2–1 | 2–1 |
| Bellinzona | 2–1 | | 5–1 | 2–1 | 3–1 | 1–1 | 2–1 | 4–1 | 0–1 | 1–0 | 0–1 | 3–2 | 1–1 | 0–3 |
| Biel-Bienne | 1–1 | 2–2 | | 3–2 | 4–1 | 3–2 | 0–2 | 2–1 | 2–2 | 5–2 | 1–0 | 5–1 | 2–5 | 1–1 |
| La Chaux-de-Fonds | 1–1 | 6–2 | 1–2 | | 2–2 | 2–3 | 1–0 | 6–2 | 3–5 | 7–1 | 1–1 | 3–0 | 1–1 | 2–2 |
| Grasshopper Club | 2–2 | 0–0 | 6–2 | 0–0 | | 3–5 | 1–2 | 4–1 | 0–0 | 2–1 | 2–2 | 0–1 | 3–1 | 0–1 |
| Lausanne-Sport | 5–0 | 1–0 | 3–1 | 3–1 | 4–1 | | 2–0 | 5–1 | 4–0 | 7–2 | 3–0 | 2–2 | 1–3 | 4–2 |
| Lugano | 1–0 | 4–0 | 0–0 | 2–2 | 2–3 | 1–1 | | 3–1 | 0–1 | 2–0 | 0–0 | 3–0 | 2–0 | 3–1 |
| Luzern | 2–3 | 0–0 | 3–1 | 3–1 | 2–2 | 1–3 | 2–1 | | 3–3 | 0–2 | 1–3 | 2–0 | 1–5 | 1–5 |
| Servette | 0–2 | 1–2 | 1–0 | 2–2 | 1–1 | 2–1 | 0–1 | 1–2 | | 2–0 | 1–0 | 4–1 | 0–0 | 1–1 |
| Sion | 1–1 | 4–0 | 1–1 | 2–1 | 2–1 | 1–1 | 1–1 | 2–3 | 4–2 | | 2–4 | 4–0 | 3–0 | 0–2 |
| St. Gallen | 0–0 | 1–1 | 1–1 | 1–1 | 1–2 | 2–4 | 1–1 | 3–0 | 2–0 | 2–1 | | 1–1 | 1–1 | 0–0 |
| Winterthur | 0–0 | 2–1 | 3–3 | 1–1 | 2–1 | 1–1 | 1–1 | 1–1 | 3–0 | 0–0 | 3–0 | | 1–1 | 1–1 |
| Young Boys | 0–2 | 2–3 | 6–2 | 1–1 | 3–1 | 4–3 | 2–1 | 3–0 | 0–1 | 1–0 | 3–0 | 3–0 | | 2–1 |
| Zürich | 0–3 | 2–2 | 3–5 | 6–2 | 2–3 | 5–1 | 1–3 | 6–0 | 3–0 | 4–1 | 4–0 | 1–0 | 3–0 | |

Source: rsssf.com
Legend: Blue = home team win; Yellow = draw; Red = away team win.

== Nationalliga B ==
=== Teams, locations ===
| Team | Based in | Canton | Stadium | Capacity |
|---|---|---|---|---|
| FC Aarau | Aarau | Aargau | Stadion Brügglifeld | 9,240 |
| FC Baden | Baden | Aargau | Esp Stadium | 7,000 |
| SC Brühl | St. Gallen | St. Gallen | Paul-Grüninger-Stadion | 4,200 |
| FC Chiasso | Chiasso | Ticino | Stadio Comunale Riva IV | 4,000 |
| Étoile Carouge FC | Carouge | Geneva | Stade de la Fontenette | 3,690 |
| FC Fribourg | Fribourg | Fribourg | Stade Universitaire | 9,000 |
| FC Grenchen | Grenchen | Solothurn | Stadium Brühl | 15,100 |
| Mendrisiostar | Mendrisio | Ticino | Centro Sportivo Comunale | 4,000 |
| FC Solothurn | Solothurn | Solothurn | Stadion FC Solothurn | 6,750 |
| FC Thun | Thun | Bern | Stadion Lachen | 10,350 |
| Urania Genève Sport | Genève | Geneva | Stade de Frontenex | 4,000 |
| FC Wettingen | Wettingen | Aargau | Stadion Altenburg | 10,000 |
| FC Xamax | Neuchâtel | Neuchâtel | Stade de la Maladière | 25,500 |
| FC Young Fellows Zürich | Zürich | Zürich | Utogrund | 2,850 |

=== Final league table ===
| Pos | Team | Pld | W | D | L | GF | GA | GD | Pts | Qualification or relegation |
|---|---|---|---|---|---|---|---|---|---|---|
| 1 | FC Wettingen | 26 | 15 | 6 | 5 | 47 | 24 | +23 | 36 | NLB Champions and promoted to 1969–70 Nationalliga A |
| 2 | FC Fribourg | 26 | 12 | 10 | 4 | 43 | 24 | +19 | 34 | Promoted to 1969–70 Nationalliga A |
| 3 | SC Brühl | 26 | 10 | 11 | 5 | 50 | 36 | +14 | 31 | |
| 4 | FC Xamax | 26 | 12 | 4 | 10 | 42 | 35 | +7 | 28 | |
| 5 | FC Chiasso | 26 | 10 | 8 | 8 | 32 | 38 | −6 | 28 | |
| 6 | FC Grenchen | 26 | 10 | 7 | 9 | 45 | 34 | +11 | 27 | |
| 7 | FC Aarau | 26 | 9 | 8 | 9 | 33 | 32 | +1 | 26 | |
| 8 | Young Fellows Zürich | 26 | 8 | 10 | 8 | 31 | 38 | −7 | 26 | |
| 9 | Mendrisiostar | 26 | 9 | 7 | 10 | 25 | 36 | −11 | 25 | |
| 10 | FC Thun | 26 | 10 | 3 | 13 | 31 | 31 | 0 | 23 | |
| 11 | Etoile Carouge FC | 26 | 7 | 9 | 10 | 27 | 33 | −6 | 23 | |
| 12 | Urania Genève Sport | 26 | 6 | 9 | 11 | 22 | 34 | −12 | 21 | |
| 13 | FC Baden | 26 | 6 | 8 | 12 | 19 | 33 | −14 | 20 | Relegated to 1969–70 1. Liga |
| 14 | FC Solothurn | 26 | 6 | 4 | 16 | 27 | 46 | −19 | 16 | Relegated to 1969–70 1. Liga |

Source: rsssf.com
Rules for classification: 1) Points; 2) Goal difference within the league, however with play-off for qualifiers;

== Further in Swiss football ==
- 1968–69 Swiss Cup
- 1968–69 Swiss 1. Liga

== Sources ==
- Switzerland 1968–69 at RSSSF

| Preceded by 1967–68 | Nationalliga seasons in Switzerland | Succeeded by 1969–70 |
