= FC Frauenfeld =

Swiss football club

- Full name: Football Club Frauenfeld
- Founded: 1906
- Ground: Kleine Allmend
- Capacity: 6375
- President: Michael Krucker
- Vice president: Urs Schmeid
- League: 2. Liga Interregional; Group 6
- 2015/16: 4th

FC Frauenfeld is a Swiss football team that currently plays in the 2. Liga Interregional, the fifth tier in the Swiss football pyramid. The club was founded in 1906. It finished the 2008/2009 season in 13th position in Group 5 resulting in relegation from the 2. Liga Interregional down to the sixth tier, the 2. Liga. However, the club improved over the years, and by the start of the 2015–16 season it was back into the 2. Liga Interregional.
