= FC Emmenbrücke =

Swiss football club

- Full name: Football Club Emmenbrücke
- Founded: 1921; 104 years ago
- Ground: Gersag
- Capacity: 4,900
- Chairman: Valon Kameraj; Armin Duss
- Manager: André Grüter
- League: 2. Liga Interregional
- 2024–25: Group 3, 9th of 16
- Website: https://www.fce1921.ch

FC Emmenbrücke are a Swiss football team with its home in the city of Emmen, currently playing in the Swiss 2. Liga Interregional, the fifth tier in the Swiss football pyramid. The club was formed in 1921. Their best result in the younger history was the 4th position in the Swiss 1. Liga at the end of 2008–09 season.

== History ==
FC Emmenbrücke was founded in 1921 in the area of Littau with the idea of separating from an already existing football club in Emmen. Yellow and black were chosen as the club colours in reference to BSC Young Boys. The main problem was finding a suitable playing field. The games were first played in Reussbühl, then from 1923 on a plot of scattered land in the Mooshüsli area in Emmen, and then again in exile until 1947, this time in Littau.

In 1947, FC Emmenbrücke returned to Emmen and played on the Emmenfeld sports field. There their first promotion to the 1. Liga was achieved.

In 1961, FC Emmenbrücke relocated to the Gersag Stadium, which is still its home ground today.

After 20 years in the 1. Liga, FC Emmenbrücke had to accept relegation to the 2. Liga, but returned in the 1978/79 season.

In the 1987/88 season, FC Emmenbrücke celebrated the biggest success in the club's history by being promoted to the National Liga B (NLB) for the first time, thus reaching the second highest league in Switzerland. In the following season, the club beat FC Biel-Bienne and Renens FC in the NLB relegation and managed to stay in the league.

A year later, FC Emmenbrücke was narrowly able avoid relegation.

After the 1991/92 season, the club was relegated to the 1. Liga as the clear loser of the NLB relegation, but was allowed to remain in the league for another season because Étoile Sportive FC Malley and SC Zug were not granted licences for the NLB. One year later, however, relegation to the 1. Liga could no longer be prevented.

After relegation from the NLB to the 1. Liga, a debt-ridden Emmenbrücke was even relegated to the regional 3. Liga until 1999. It was not until 2002 that a turnaround was achieved with promotion to the 2. Liga.

At the end of the 2007/08 season, FC Emmenbrücke celebrated the renovation of the main stand of the Gersag stadium. They even managed to return to the 1. Liga (at that time the third highest Swiss league), where FC Emmenbrücke immediately finished the 2008/09 season in an excellent fourth place. In the same season, a successful performance grouping of A to C juniors was founded with neighbouring SC Emmen under the name "Emmen United".

At the end of the 2009/10 season, which was marked by enormous disadvantages for FC Emmenbrücke due to the guest games of FC Luzern in the Gersag stadium (because the FC Luzern's own stadium was under construction), the FC Emmenbrücke had to accept relegation to the 2. Liga again, where they played the four following seasons.

In the 2014/15 season, the team was once again relegated directly to the 3. Liga. In the 2015/16 season, FC Emmenbrücke missed out on immediate relegation back up to the 2. Liga narrowly. Two years later, the team managed the promotion to the 2. Liga.

in the 2018/19 season the junior grouping "Emmen United" had to be suspended and the only A-junior team was temporarily withdrawn.

In 2021, the FC Emmenbrücke celebrated its 100th anniversary.
