= 1972–73 UEFA Cup =

2nd season of Europe's secondary club football tournament organised by UEFA

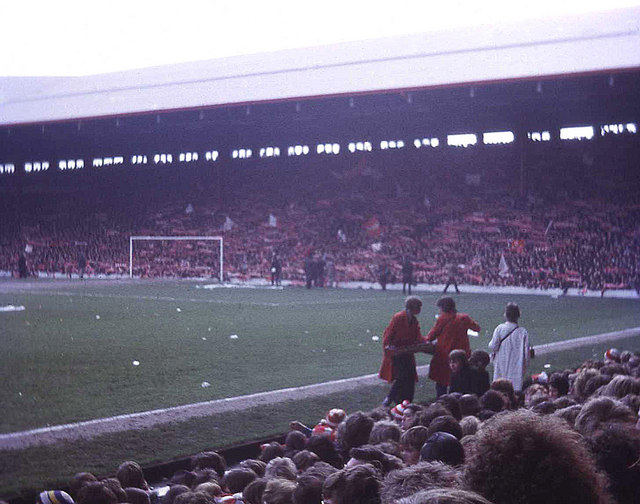
- The first leg of the final was played at Anfield in Liverpool.

Tournament details
- Dates: 13 September 1972 – 23 May 1973
- Teams: 63 (from 29 associations)

Final positions
- Champions: (England) Liverpool (1st title)
- Runners-up: (West Germany) Borussia Mönchengladbach

Tournament statistics
- Matches played: 124
- Goals scored: 405 (3.27 per match)
- Attendance: 1,947,828 (15,708 per match)
- Top scorer(s): Jupp Heynckes (Borussia Mönchengladbach); Jan Jeuring (Twente); 12 goals each

The 1972–73 UEFA Cup was the second season of the UEFA Cup, the third-tier club football competition organised by UEFA. The 1973 UEFA Cup final was played over two legs at Anfield, Liverpool, England, and at Bökelbergstadion, Mönchengladbach, West Germany. It was won by Liverpool of England, who defeated West German team Borussia Mönchengladbach by an aggregate result of 3–2 to claim their first UEFA Cup title.

This was the sixth consecutive title won by an English team between the UEFA Cup and the Inter-Cities Fairs Cup, as well as the first time Liverpool won a European competition.

== Association team allocation ==
A total of 63 teams from 29 UEFA member associations participate in the 1972–73 UEFA Cup. A new allocation scheme was devised by UEFA, which featured fixed slots for all but two competing associations, and lasted for eight seasons:

- 3 associations have four teams qualify.
- 3 associations have three teams qualify.
- 18 associations have two teams qualify.
- 7 associations have one team qualify.

Spain was the only association with a fixed allocation of three teams; the other two associations would rotate on a yearly basis among all countries that were allocated two teams.

Albania was not included in this scheme, as it had only entered the competition once without playing and would not have a UEFA Cup competitor until 1981. Northern Ireland withdrew from the competition, so another association was granted an extra third birth for this season. The three chosen associations were France, Yugoslavia and Portugal.

Associations in the 1972–73 UEFA Cup

Four teams
England
Italy
West Germany
Three teams
Spain
Portugal
(Socialist Federal Republic of Yugoslavia) Yugoslavia
France

Two teams
Hungary	Scotland	Netherlands
Poland	East Germany	Czechoslovakia
Belgium	Bulgaria	Soviet Union
Romania	Turkey	Austria
Greece	Switzerland	Denmark
Sweden	Norway	

One team
Republic of Ireland
Luxembourg
Malta
Iceland
Cyprus

Did not compete
Wales
Northern Ireland
Albania
Finland

Wales: There was no national league in Wales before 1992 and the only competition organised by the Football Association of Wales was the Welsh Cup so Wales had just a single participant in European competitions, the winner (or best placed Welsh team as several English teams also competed) of the Welsh Cup which competed in the UEFA Cup Winners' Cup.
Northern Ireland: Due to the Troubles and the aftermath of the Bloody Sunday, Northern Ireland withdrew from all European competitions on safety grounds. Portadown would have qualified for the UEFA Cup by league position.
Albania: After withdrawing its team from the previous edition, Albania was punished with a one-year ban for the UEFA Cup. 17 Nëntori would have qualified by league position.

=== Teams ===
The labels in the parentheses show how each team qualified for competition:

- TH: Title holders
- CW: Cup winners
- CR: Cup runners-up
- LC: League Cup winners
- 2nd, 3rd, 4th, 5th, 6th, etc.: League position
- P-W: End-of-season European competition play-offs winners

Qualified teams for 1972–73 UEFA Cup
(England) Tottenham Hotspur (TH)	(England) Liverpool (3rd)	(England) Manchester City (4th)	(England) Stoke City (LC)
(Italy) Torino (3rd)	(Italy) Cagliari (4th)	(Italy) Inter Milan (5th)	(Italy) Fiorentina (6th)
(West Germany) Borussia Mönchengladbach (3rd)	(West Germany) Köln (4th)	(West Germany) Eintracht Frankfurt (5th)	(West Germany) Kaiserslautern (CR)
(Spain) Valencia (2nd)	(Spain) Barcelona (3rd)	(Spain) Las Palmas (5th)	(Portugal) Vitória de Setúbal (2nd)
(Portugal) Barreiro (4th)	(Portugal) Porto (5th)	(Socialist Federal Republic of Yugoslavia) Red Star Belgrade (2nd)	(Socialist Federal Republic of Yugoslavia) OFK Beograd (3rd)
(Socialist Federal Republic of Yugoslavia) Vojvodina (4th)	(France) Nîmes (2nd)	(France) Sochaux (3rd)	(France) Angers (4th)
(Hungary) Budapest Honvéd (2nd)	(Hungary) Salgótarján (4th)	(Scotland) Aberdeen (2nd)	(Scotland) Partick Thistle (LC)
(Netherlands) Feyenoord (2nd)	(Netherlands) Twente (3rd)	(Poland) Zagłębie Sosnowiec (2nd)	(Poland) Ruch Chorzów (4th)
(East Germany) BFC Dynamo (2nd)	(East Germany) Dynamo Dresden (3rd)	(Czechoslovakia) Slovan Bratislava (2nd)	(Czechoslovakia) Dukla Prague (3rd)
(Belgium) Club Brugge (2nd)	(Belgium) Racing White (4th)	(Bulgaria) Levski Sofia (2nd)	(Bulgaria) Beroe Stara Zagora (3rd)
(Soviet Union) Ararat Yerevan (2nd)	(Soviet Union) Dinamo Tbilisi (3rd)	(Romania) UTA Arad (2nd)	(Romania) Universitatea Cluj (3rd)
(Turkey) Eskişehirspor (2nd)	(Turkey) Fenerbahçe (3rd)	Austria Wien (2nd)	(Austria) VÖEST Linz (3rd)
(Greece) Olympiacos (2nd)	(Greece) AEK Athens (3rd)	(Switzerland) Grasshoppers (3rd)	(Switzerland) Lausanne-Sport (4th)
(Denmark) Hvidovre (2nd)	(Denmark) Frem (3rd)	(Sweden) Åtvidaberg (2nd)	(Sweden) Norrköping (3rd)
(Norway) Lyn (2nd)	(Norway) Viking (3rd)	(Republic of Ireland) Bohemians (3rd)	(Finland) HIFK Helsinki (2nd)
(Luxembourg) Rumelange (2nd)	(Malta) Valletta (3rd)	(Iceland) ÍBV (2nd)	(Cyprus) EPA Larnaca (2nd)

Notes

1. West Germany: The fourth UEFA Cup spot for West Germany was not awarded to the fourth best team not qualified for the European Cup or the European Cup Winners' Cup, which was Hertha BSC, as it was common practice. Instead, this place was awarded to Kaiserslautern, who had been runners-up in the 1971–72 DFB-Pokal.
2. Finland: Official UEFA records show HJK Helsinki as the Finnish representative in the UEFA Cup, despite finishing 4th in the 1971 Mestaruussarja, before withdrawing from its first round match-up. However, records from the RSSSF, contemporary papers and the Football Association of Finland show that HIFK Helsinki was indeed the team that withdrew from the tournament after finishing 2nd in the Mestaruussarja. While no official reason for the withdrawal has been provided, HIFK ran into financial problems during the 1972 season and was fighting to avoid relegation at the time of the UEFA Cup first round. The team was finally relegated on 24 September 1972, halfway through what should've been its European participation.

== Schedule ==
The schedule of the competition was as follows. Matches were scheduled for Wednesdays, though some matches took place on Tuesdays.

Schedule for 1972–73 UEFA Cup
Round	First leg	Second leg
First round	12–20 September 1972	26 September – 4 October 1972
Second round	24–25 October 1972	1–8 November 1972
Third round	28–29 November 1972	13 December 1972
Quarter-finals	6–7 March 1973	20–21 March 1973
Semi-finals	10–11 April 1973	25 April 1973
Final	10 May 1973	23 May 1973

== Bracket ==
First round
(France) Angers	1	1
(East Germany) BFC Dynamo	1	2
(Romania) Universitatea Cluj	4	1
(Bulgaria) Levski-Spartak	1	5
(England) Liverpool	2	0
(West Germany) Eintracht Frankfurt	0	0
(Greece) AEK Athens	3	1
(Hungary) Salgótarján	1	1
(Portugal) Porto	3	1
(Spain) Barcelona	1	0
(Sweden) Åtvidaberg	3	2
(Belgium) Club Brugge	5	1
(Poland) Ruch Chorzów	3	0
(Turkey) Fenerbahçe	0	1
(East Germany) Dynamo Dresden	2	2
(Austria) VÖEST	0	2
(Norway) Lyn	3	0
(England) Tottenham Hotspur	6	6
(Greece) Olympiacos	2	1
(Italy) Cagliari	1	0
(Socialist Federal Republic of Yugoslavia) Red Star Belgrade	5	2
(Switzerland) Lausanne-Sport	1	3
(England) Manchester City	2	1
(Spain) Valencia	2	2
(Portugal) Vitória de Setúbal	6	0
(Poland) Zagłębie Sosnowiec	1	1
(Turkey) Eskişehirspor	1	0
(Italy) Fiorentina	2	3
(Italy) Inter Milan	6	1
(Malta) Valletta	1	0
(Romania) UTA Arad	1	0
(Sweden) Norrköping	2	2
(Belgium) Racing White	0	0
(Portugal) CUF Barreiro	1	2
(England) Stoke City	3	0
(West Germany) Kaiserslautern	1	4
(France) Nîmes	1	1
(Switzerland) Grasshoppers	2	2
(Cyprus) EPA Larnaca	0	0
(Soviet Union) Ararat Yerevan	1	1
(Norway) Viking	1	0
(Iceland) ÍBV	0	0
(West Germany) Köln	2	3
(Republic of Ireland) Bohemians	1	0
(Scotland) Aberdeen	2	3
(West Germany) Borussia Mönchengladbach	3	6
(Denmark) Hvidovre (w/o)
(Finland) HIFK Helsinki
(Netherlands) Feyenoord	9	12
(Luxembourg) Rumelange	0	0
(Czechoslovakia) Dukla Prague	2	1
(Socialist Federal Republic of Yugoslavia) OFK Beograd	2	3
(Bulgaria) Beroe Stara Zagora	7	3
Austria Wien	0	1
(Hungary) Budapest Honvéd	1	3
(Scotland) Partick Thistle	0	0
(France) Sochaux	1	1
(Denmark) Frem	3	2
(Soviet Union) Dinamo Tbilisi	3	0
(Netherlands) Twente	2	2
(Italy) Torino	2	0
(Spain) Las Palmas	0	4
(Czechoslovakia) Slovan Bratislava	6	2
(Socialist Federal Republic of Yugoslavia) Vojvodina	0	1

Second round
(East Germany) BFC Dynamo	3	0
(Bulgaria) Levski-Spartak	0	2
(England) Liverpool	3	3
(Greece) AEK Athens	0	1
(Portugal) Porto	3	2
(Belgium) Club Brugge	0	3
(Poland) Ruch Chorzów	0	0
(East Germany) Dynamo Dresden	1	3
(England) Tottenham Hotspur	4	0
(Greece) Olympiacos	0	1
(Socialist Federal Republic of Yugoslavia) Red Star Belgrade	3	1
(Spain) Valencia	1	0
(Portugal) Vitória de Setúbal (a)	1	1
(Italy) Fiorentina	0	2
(Italy) Inter Milan	2	2
(Sweden) Norrköping	2	0
(Portugal) CUF Barreiro	1	1
(West Germany) Kaiserslautern	3	0
(Switzerland) Grasshoppers	1	2
(Soviet Union) Ararat Yerevan	3	4
(Norway) Viking	1	1
(West Germany) Köln	0	9
(West Germany) Borussia Mönchengladbach	3	3
(Denmark) Hvidovre	0	1
(Netherlands) Feyenoord	4	1
(Socialist Federal Republic of Yugoslavia) OFK Beograd (a)	3	2
(Bulgaria) Beroe Stara Zagora	3	0
(Hungary) Budapest Honvéd	0	1
(Denmark) Frem	0	0
(Netherlands) Twente	5	4
(Spain) Las Palmas	2	1
(Czechoslovakia) Slovan Bratislava	2	0

Third round
(East Germany) BFC Dynamo	0	1
(England) Liverpool	0	3
(Portugal) Porto	1	0
(East Germany) Dynamo Dresden	2	1
(England) Tottenham Hotspur	2	0
(Socialist Federal Republic of Yugoslavia) Red Star Belgrade	0	1
(Portugal) Vitória de Setúbal	2	0
(Italy) Inter Milan	0	1
(West Germany) Kaiserslautern (p)	2	0 (5)
(Soviet Union) Ararat Yerevan	0	2 (4)
(West Germany) Köln	0	0
(West Germany) Borussia Mönchengladbach	0	5
(Socialist Federal Republic of Yugoslavia) OFK Beograd	0	3
(Bulgaria) Beroe Stara Zagora	0	1
(Netherlands) Twente	3	1
(Spain) Las Palmas	0	2

Quarter-finals
(England) Liverpool	2	1
(East Germany) Dynamo Dresden	0	0
(England) Tottenham Hotspur (a)	1	1
(Portugal) Vitória de Setúbal	0	2
(West Germany) Kaiserslautern	1	1
(West Germany) Borussia Mönchengladbach	2	7
(Socialist Federal Republic of Yugoslavia) OFK Beograd	3	0
(Netherlands) Twente	2	2

Semi-finals
(England) Liverpool (a)	1	1
(England) Tottenham Hotspur	0	2
Final
(England) Liverpool	3	0
(West Germany) Borussia Mönchengladbach	0	2
(West Germany) Borussia Mönchengladbach	3	2
(Netherlands) Twente	0	1

== First round ==
=== Summary ===
Team 1	Agg.	Team 2	1st leg	2nd leg
Liverpool (England)	2–0	(West Germany) Eintracht Frankfurt	2–0	0–0
UTA Arad (Romania)	1–4	(Sweden) Norrköping	1–2	0–2
Universitatea Cluj (Romania)	5–6	(Bulgaria) Levski-Spartak	4–1	1–5 (a.e.t.)
AEK Athens (Greece)	4–2	(Hungary) Salgótarján	3–1	1–1
Beroe Stara Zagora (Bulgaria)	10–1	Austria Wien	7–0	3–1
Dinamo Tbilisi (Soviet Union)	3–4	(Netherlands) Twente	3–2	0–2
Slovan Bratislava (Czechoslovakia)	8–1	(Socialist Federal Republic of Yugoslavia) Vojvodina	6–0	2–1
Ruch Chorzów (Poland)	3–1	(Turkey) Fenerbahçe	3–0	0–1
Dynamo Dresden (East Germany)	4–2	(Austria) VÖEST	2–0	2–2
Red Star Belgrade (Socialist Federal Republic of Yugoslavia)	7–4	(Switzerland) Lausanne-Sport	5–1	2–3
Dukla Prague (Czechoslovakia)	3–5	(Socialist Federal Republic of Yugoslavia) OFK Beograd	2–2	1–3
Lyn (Norway)	3–12	(England) Tottenham Hotspur	3–6	0–6
Viking (Norway)	1–0	(Iceland) ÍBV	1–0	0–0
Åtvidaberg (Sweden)	5–6	(Belgium) Club Brugge	3–5	2–1
Sochaux (France)	2–5	(Denmark) Frem	1–3	1–2
Budapest Honvéd (Hungary)	4–0	(Scotland) Partick Thistle	1–0	3–0
Köln (West Germany)	5–1	(Republic of Ireland) Bohemians	2–1	3–0
Aberdeen (Scotland)	5–9	(West Germany) Borussia Mönchengladbach	2–3	3–6
Angers (France)	2–3	(East Germany) BFC Dynamo	1–1	1–2
Feyenoord (Netherlands)	21–0	(Luxembourg) Rumelange	9–0	12–0
Manchester City (England)	3–4	(Spain) Valencia	2–2	1–2
Nîmes (France)	2–4	(Switzerland) Grasshoppers	1–2	1–2
Stoke City (England)	3–5	(West Germany) Kaiserslautern	3–1	0–4
Torino (Italy)	2–4	(Spain) Las Palmas	2–0	0–4
Inter Milan (Italy)	7–1	(Malta) Valletta	6–1	1–0
Vitória de Setúbal (Portugal)	6–2	(Poland) Zagłębie Sosnowiec	6–1	0–1
EPA Larnaca (Cyprus)	0–2	(Soviet Union) Ararat Yerevan	0–1	0–1
Eskişehirspor (Turkey)	1–5	(Italy) Fiorentina	1–2	0–3
Olympiacos (Greece)	3–1	(Italy) Cagliari	2–1	1–0
Racing White (Belgium)	0–3	(Portugal) CUF Barreiro	0–1	0–2
Porto (Portugal)	4–1	(Spain) Barcelona	3–1	1–0
Hvidovre (Denmark)	(w/o)^{1}	(Finland) HIFK Helsinki	—	—

^{1} Hvidovre walkover, HIFK withdrew.

=== Matches ===
12 September 1972

Liverpool (England)	2–0	(West Germany) Eintracht Frankfurt
Keegan 12'; Hughes 75'	Report

Anfield, Liverpool
Attendance: 33,380
Referee: Concetto Lo Bello (Italy)
26 September 1972

Eintracht Frankfurt (West Germany)	0–0	(England) Liverpool
	Report

Waldstadion, Frankfurt
Attendance: 17,500
Referee: György Müncz (Hungary)

Liverpool won 2–0 on aggregate.

13 September 1972

UTA Arad (Romania)	1–2	(Sweden) Norrköping
Broșovschi 26'	Report	Kindvall 47'; Wendt 60'

Stadionul Francisc von Neuman, Arad
Attendance: 7,000
Referee: Fehmi Pazarici (Turkey)
27 September 1972

Norrköping (Sweden)	2–0	(Romania) UTA Arad
Kindvall 6'; Wendt 37'	Report

Norrköpings Idrottspark, Norrköping
Attendance: 2,030
Referee: Tofiq Bahramov (Soviet Union)

Norrköping won 4–1 on aggregate.

13 September 1972

Universitatea Cluj (Romania)	4–1	(Bulgaria) Levski-Spartak
Șoo 67'; Crețu 70'; Mureșan 78'; Uifăleanu 87'	Report	Haralampiev 54'

Stadionul Municipal, Cluj-Napoca
Attendance: 6,105
Referee: Gerhard Künze (East Germany)
4 October 1972

Levski-Spartak (Bulgaria)	5–1 (a.e.t.)	(Romania) Universitatea Cluj
Tsvetkov 38'; Zhechev 41'; Veselinov 63', 85'; Mitkov 109' (pen.)	Report	Munteanu 88'

Levski Stadium, Sofia
Attendance: 8,000
Referee: Ivan Placek (Czechoslovakia)

Levski-Spartak won 6–5 on aggregate.

13 September 1972

AEK Athens (Greece)	3–1	(Hungary) Salgótarján
Nikolaou 1', 54' (pen.); Vicente 42'	Report	Jeck 89' (pen.)

AEK Stadium, Nea Filadelfeia
Attendance: 14,798
Referee: Günter Männig (East Germany)
27 September 1972

Salgótarján (Hungary)	1–1	(Greece) AEK Athens
Básti 53' (pen.)	Report	Nikolaou 86'

Malinovski út Sporttél, Nógrád County
Attendance: 4,004
Referee: Charles Corver (Netherlands)

AEK Athens won 4–2 on aggregate.

13 September 1972

Beroe Stara Zagora (Bulgaria)	7–0	Austria Wien
Petkov 12', 29', 44', 82', 86'; Belchev 25'; Yanchovski 89'	Report

Stadion Beroe, Stara Zagora
Attendance: 12,971
Referee: Paolo Toselli (Italy)
27 September 1972

Austria Wien	1–3	(Bulgaria) Beroe Stara Zagora
Gallautz 11'	Report	Petkov 3', 37'; Belchev 64'

Sportklub Stadium, Vienna
Attendance: 1,904
Referee: Mario Clematide (Switzerland)

Beroe Stara Zagora won 10–1 on aggregate.

13 September 1972

Dinamo Tbilisi (Soviet Union)	3–2	(Netherlands) Twente
Nodia 23', 53'; Kipiani 51'	Report	Jeuring 6', 82'

Lokomotivi Stadium, Tbilisi
Attendance: 35,000
Referee: Efstathios Papavasiliou (Greece)
27 September 1972

Twente (Netherlands)	2–0	(Soviet Union) Dinamo Tbilisi
Notten 7'; Jeuring 24'	Report

Diekman Stadion, Enschede
Attendance: 15,144
Referee: Jacques Colling (Luxembourg)

Twente won 4–2 on aggregate.

13 September 1972

Slovan Bratislava (Czechoslovakia)	6–0	(Socialist Federal Republic of Yugoslavia) Vojvodina
Čapkovič 15', 24', 55', 75', 88'; Pekárik 80'	Report

Tehelné pole, Bratislava
Attendance: 4,996
Referee: Atanas Mateev (Bulgaria)
27 September 1972

Vojvodina (Socialist Federal Republic of Yugoslavia)	1–2	(Czechoslovakia) Slovan Bratislava
Perazić 81'	Report	Jokl 9'; Móder 25'

Karađorđe Stadium, Novi Sad
Attendance: 2,779
Referee: Marian Środecki (Poland)

Slovan Bratislava won 8–2 on aggregate.

13 September 1972

Ruch Chorzów (Poland)	3–0	(Turkey) Fenerbahçe
Maszczyk 13'; Kopicera 55'; Bon 59'	Report

Stadion Miejski, Chorzów
Attendance: 20,000
Referee: Reino Koskinen (Finland)
27 September 1972

Fenerbahçe (Turkey)	1–0	(Poland) Ruch Chorzów
Özer 70'	Report

İnönü Stadium, Istanbul
Attendance: 15,000
Referee: Wolfgang Riedel (East Germany)

Ruch Chorzów won 3–1 on aggregate.

13 September 1972

Dynamo Dresden (East Germany)	2–0	(Austria) VÖEST
Kreische 6' (pen.), 42'	Report

Rudolf-Harbig-Stadion, Dresden
Attendance: 20,969
Referee: Ejner Espersen (Denmark)
27 September 1972

VÖEST (Austria)	2–2	(East Germany) Dynamo Dresden
Stering 60'; Mißfeld 83'	Report	Richter 15'; Lichtenberger 28'

Linzer Stadion, Linz
Attendance: 2,158
Referee: Bohumil Kopcio (Czechoslovakia)

Dynamo Dresden won 4–2 on aggregate.

13 September 1972

Red Star Belgrade (Socialist Federal Republic of Yugoslavia)	5–1	(Switzerland) Lausanne-Sport
Karasi 17'; Lazarević 25', 55', 88'; Janković 67'	Report	Grahn 63'

Red Star Stadium, Belgrade
Attendance: 3,555
Referee: Ertuğrul Dilek (Turkey)
27 September 1972

Lausanne-Sport (Switzerland)	3–2	(Socialist Federal Republic of Yugoslavia) Red Star Belgrade
Cucinotta 28'; Grahn 80'; García 89'	Report	Janković 14', 44'

Stade Olympique de la Pontaise, Lausanne
Attendance: 8,000
Referee: Pablo Sánchez Ibáñez (Spain)

Red Star Belgrade won 7–4 on aggregate.

13 September 1972

Dukla Prague (Czechoslovakia)	2–2	(Socialist Federal Republic of Yugoslavia) OFK Beograd
Herda 57'; Bendl 65'	Report	Petković 42'; Turudija 70'

Stadion Juliska, Prague
Attendance: 4,553
Referee: Kurt Tschenscher (West Germany)
27 September 1972

OFK Beograd (Socialist Federal Republic of Yugoslavia)	3–1	(Czechoslovakia) Dukla Prague
Zec 10'; Petković 38'; Santrač 79'	Report	Herda 60'

Omladinski Stadium, Belgrade
Attendance: 3,496
Referee: Alois Kessler (Austria)

OFK Beograd won 5–3 on aggregate.

13 September 1972

Lyn (Norway)	3–6	(England) Tottenham Hotspur
Austnes 7'; Christophersen 39', 57'	Report	Peters 8'; Pratt 24'; Gilzean 37', 38'; Chivers 82', 83'

Ullevaal Stadion, Oslo
Attendance: 10,770
Referee: Martti Hirviniemi (Finland)
27 September 1972

Tottenham Hotspur (England)	6–0	(Norway) Lyn
Chivers 20', 31', 70'; Coates 52', 83'; Pearce 57'	Report

White Hart Lane, London
Attendance: 21,109
Referee: Magnus Pétursson (Iceland)

Tottenham Hotspur won 12–3 on aggregate.

13 September 1972

Viking (Norway)	1–0	(Iceland) ÍBV
Kvia 13'	Report

Stavanger Stadion, Stavanger
Attendance: 8,990
Referee: Erik Axelryd (Sweden)
27 September 1972

ÍBV (Iceland)	0–0	(Norway) Viking
	Report

Hásteinsvöllur, Vestmannaeyjar
Attendance: 3,368
Referee: John Gordon (Scotland)

Viking won 1–0 on aggregate.

13 September 1972

Åtvidaberg (Sweden)	3–5	(Belgium) Club Brugge
Svensson 24', 43'; Wallinder 25'	Report	Thio 1', 74'; Lambert 12', 53'; Devrindt 76'

Kopparvallen, Åtvidaberg
Attendance: 3,927
Referee: Brunon Piotrowicz (Poland)
27 September 1972

Club Brugge (Belgium)	1–2	(Sweden) Åtvidaberg
Geels 38'	Report	Olsson 32'; Svensson 63'

Klokke Stadion, Bruges
Attendance: 14,103
Referee: William Mullan (Scotland)

Club Brugge won 6–5 on aggregate.

13 September 1972

Sochaux (France)	1–3	(Denmark) Frem
Lechantre 7'	Report	Mortensen 39'; Ahlberg 54'; Mørk 62'

Stade Auguste Bonal, Montbéliard
Attendance: 6,452
Referee: Antoine Queudeville (Luxembourg)
27 September 1972

Frem (Denmark)	2–1	(France) Sochaux
Madsen 15'; Mørk 68'	Report	Perrin 86'

Valby Idrætspark, Copenhagen
Attendance: 1,919
Referee: Iorwerth Jones (Wales)

Frem won 5–2 on aggregate.

13 September 1972

Budapest Honvéd (Hungary)	1–0	(Scotland) Partick Thistle
Kozma 44'	Report

Bozsik József Stadion, Budapest
Attendance: 5,000
Referee: Milivoje Gugulović (Yugoslavia)
27 September 1972

Partick Thistle (Scotland)	0–3	(Hungary) Budapest Honvéd
	Report	Kiss 9'; Kozma 54', 61'

Firhill Stadium, Glasgow
Attendance: 16,513
Referee: Leo van der Kroft (Netherlands)

Budapest Honvéd won 4–0 on aggregate.

13 September 1972

Köln (West Germany)	2–1	(Republic of Ireland) Bohemians
Flohe 48', 65'	Report	Daly 24'

Müngersdorfer Stadion, Cologne
Attendance: 3,500
Referee: José María Ortiz (Spain)
27 September 1972

Bohemians (Republic of Ireland)	0–3	(West Germany) Köln
	Report	Flohe 76'; Kapellmann 81'; Lauscher 84'

Dalymount Park, Dublin
Attendance: 10,800
Referee: Franz Geluck (Belgium)

Köln won 5–1 on aggregate.

13 September 1972

Aberdeen (Scotland)	2–3	(West Germany) Borussia Mönchengladbach
Harper 55'; Jarvie 71'	Report	Kulik 20'; Heynckes 39'; Jensen 75'

Pittodrie Stadium, Aberdeen
Attendance: 20,242
Referee: Roger Machin (France)
27 September 1972

Borussia Mönchengladbach (West Germany)	6–3	(Scotland) Aberdeen
Rupp 2'; Heynckes 39' (pen.), 79', 89'; Vogts 70'; Danner 84' (pen.)	Report	Jarvie 21'; Willoughby 25'; Murray 45'

Max-Morlock-Stadion, Nuremberg
Attendance: 19,000
Referee: Francis Rion (Belgium)

Borussia Mönchengladbach won 9–5 on aggregate.

13 September 1972

Angers (France)	1–1	(East Germany) BFC Dynamo
Lemée 46'	Report	Johannsen 77' (pen.)

Stade Raymond Kopa, Angers
Attendance: 12,112
Referee: Antonio Camacho Jiménez (Spain)
27 September 1972

BFC Dynamo (East Germany)	2–1	(France) Angers
Schulenberg 28'; Schütze 55'	Report	Lassallette 50'

Dynamo-Stadion im Sportforum, East Berlin
Attendance: 12,000
Referee: Ken Burns (England)

BFC Dynamo won 3–2 on aggregate.

13 September 1972

Feyenoord (Netherlands)	9–0	(Luxembourg) Rumelange
Jansen 10'; Van Hanegem 12', 62'; Ressel 17'; Kristensen 36'; Hasil 47'; De Jong 60', 75'; Ladinszky 66'	Report

De Kuip, Rotterdam
Attendance: 14,034
Referee: Karol Šárka (Czechoslovakia)
27 September 1972

Rumelange (Luxembourg)	0–12	(Netherlands) Feyenoord
	Report	Ladinszky 6', 62', 81'; Schneider 9'; De Jong 10', 31', 44'; Hasil 25', 76'; Van Hanegem 52'; Schoenmaker 56', 88'

Stade Municipal, Rumelange
Attendance: 1,318
Referee: Pierre Wouters (Belgium)

Feyenoord won 21–0 on aggregate.

13 September 1972

Manchester City (England)	2–2	(Spain) Valencia
Mellor 7'; Marsh 61'	Report	Valdez 42'; Adorno 55'

Maine Road, Manchester
Attendance: 21,698
Referee: Hans-Joachim Weyland (West Germany)
27 September 1972

Valencia (Spain)	2–1	(England) Manchester City
Valdez 71'; Quino 78'	Report	Marsh 89'

Mestalla Stadium, Valencia
Attendance: 32,024
Referee: Michel Kitabdjian (France)

Valencia won 4–3 on aggregate.

13 September 1972

Nîmes (France)	1–2	(Switzerland) Grasshoppers
Dell'Oste 30'	Report	Müller 28'; Winiger 67'

Stade Jean-Bouin, Nîmes
Attendance: 8,569
Referee: Joaquim Fernandes Campos (Portugal)
26 September 1972

Grasshoppers (Switzerland)	2–1	(France) Nîmes
Müller 19'; Citherlet 37' (pen.)	Report	Adams 49'

Hardturm, Zürich
Attendance: 4,800
Referee: Jan Keizer (Netherlands)

Grasshoppers won 4–2 on aggregate.

13 September 1972

Stoke City (England)	3–1	(West Germany) Kaiserslautern
Conroy 59'; Hurst 70'; Ritchie 85'	Report	Hošić 76'

Victoria Ground, Stoke-on-Trent
Attendance: 22,182
Referee: Kjell Wahlen (Norway)
27 September 1972

Kaiserslautern (West Germany)	4–0	(England) Stoke City
Huber 23'; Friedrich 45'; Bitz 64'; Hošić 79'	Report

Fritz-Walter-Stadion, Kaiserslautern
Attendance: 9,153
Referee: Stanisław Eksztajn (Poland)

Kaiserslautern won 5–3 on aggregate.

13 September 1972

Torino (Italy)	2–0	(Spain) Las Palmas
Toschi 11', 44'	Report

Stadio Comunale, Turin
Attendance: 12,125
Referee: Joseph M. Cassar Naudi (Malta)
27 September 1972

Las Palmas (Spain)	4–0	(Italy) Torino
Soto 5', 47'; Germán 39', 72'	Report

Estadio Insular, Las Palmas
Attendance: 24,000
Referee: Walter Eschweiler (West Germany)

Las Palmas won 4–2 on aggregate.

13 September 1972

Inter Milan (Italy)	6–1	(Malta) Valletta
Boninsegna 11' (pen.), 29', 45', 65'; Massa 23'; Bedin 33'	Report	Borg I 34'

San Siro, Milan
Attendance: 8,278
Referee: Ermis Reires (Cyprus)
27 September 1972

Valletta (Malta)	0–1	(Italy) Inter Milan
	Report	Massa 23'

Empire Stadium, Gżira
Attendance: 11,071
Referee: Timoleon Latsios (Greece)

Inter Milan won 7–1 on aggregate.

13 September 1972

Vitória de Setúbal (Portugal)	6–1	(Poland) Zagłębie Sosnowiec
Duda 12', 54'; Quinta Arcanjo 37'; João 53', 70'; Guerreiro 75'	Report	Jarosik 85'

Estádio do Bonfim, Setúbal
Attendance: 6,901
Referee: Thomas Reynolds (Wales)
28 September 1972

Zagłębie Sosnowiec (Poland)	1–0	(Portugal) Vitória de Setúbal
Ambroży 55' (pen.)	Report

Stadion Ludowy, Sosnowiec
Attendance: 3,000
Referee: Erik Axelryd (Sweden)

Vitória de Setúbal won 6–2 on aggregate.

14 September 1972

EPA Larnaca (Cyprus)	0–1	(Soviet Union) Ararat Yerevan
	Report	Vasiliou 61' (o.g.)

GSZ Stadium, Larnaca
Attendance: 1,602
Referee: Nicolae Rainea (Romania)
27 September 1972

Ararat Yerevan (Soviet Union)	1–0	(Cyprus) EPA Larnaca
Ishtoyan 49'	Report

Hrazdan Stadium, Yerevan
Attendance: 12,735
Referee: Petar Nikolov (Bulgaria)

Ararat Yerevan won 2–0 on aggregate.

14 September 1972

Eskişehirspor (Turkey)	1–2	(Italy) Fiorentina
Vahap 75'	Report	Sormani 36'; Clerici 85'

Ali Sami Yen Stadium, Istanbul
Attendance: 11,254
Referee: Gheorghi Bakanidze (Soviet Union)
27 September 1972

Fiorentina (Italy)	3–0	(Turkey) Eskişehirspor
Clerici 6', 74' (pen.); Saltutti 34'	Report

Stadio Artemio Franchi, Florence
Attendance: 8,393
Referee: Lajos Somlai (Hungary)

Fiorentina won 5–1 on aggregate.

14 September 1972

Olympiacos (Greece)	2–1	(Italy) Cagliari
Gioutsos 2'; Triantafyllos 51'	Report	Domenghini 66'

Karaiskakis Stadium, Piraeus
Attendance: 39,935
Referee: Ferdinand Marschall (Austria)
27 September 1972

Cagliari (Italy)	0–1	(Greece) Olympiacos
	Report	Gioutsos 10'

Stadio Sant'Elia, Cagliari
Attendance: 13,511
Referee: Rudi Glöckner (West Germany)

Olympiacos won 3–1 on aggregate.

20 September 1972

Racing White (Belgium)	0–1	(Portugal) CUF Barreiro
	Report	Vanderborght 84' (o.g.)

Stade Fallon, Brussels
Attendance: 4,951
Referee: David W. Smith (England)
27 September 1972

CUF Barreiro (Portugal)	2–0	(Belgium) Racing White
Ribeiro 77', 86'	Report

Estádio Alfredo da Silva, Barreiro
Attendance: 2,179
Referee: Mariano Medina Iglesias (Spain)

CUF Barreiro won 3–0 on aggregate.

20 September 1972

Porto (Portugal)	3–1	(Spain) Barcelona
Flávio 48'; Miglietti 51', 66'	Report	Barrios 33'

Estádio das Antas, Porto
Attendance: 18,056
Referee: Karl Keller (Switzerland)
29 September 1972

Barcelona (Spain)	0–1	(Portugal) Porto
	Report	Miglietti 19'

Camp Nou, Barcelona
Attendance: 36,200
Referee: Concetto Lo Bello (Italy)

Porto won 4–1 on aggregate.

12 September 1972

Hvidovre (Denmark)	Cancelled	(Finland) HIFK
	Report

Hvidovre Stadium, Hvidovre
4 October 1972

HIFK (Finland)	Cancelled	(Denmark) Hvidovre
	Report

Helsinki Olympic Stadium, Helsinki

Hvidovre walkover, HIFK withdrew.

== Second round ==
=== Summary ===
Team 1	Agg.	Team 2	1st leg	2nd leg
Viking (Norway)	2–9	(West Germany) Köln	1–0	1–9
Liverpool (England)	6–1	(Greece) AEK Athens	3–0	3–1
Beroe Stara Zagora (Bulgaria)	3–1	(Hungary) Budapest Honvéd	3–0	0–1
BFC Dynamo (East Germany)	3–2	(Bulgaria) Levski-Spartak	3–0	0–2
Red Star Belgrade (Socialist Federal Republic of Yugoslavia)	4–1	(Spain) Valencia	3–1	1–0
CUF Barreiro (Portugal)	2–3	(West Germany) Kaiserslautern	1–3	1–0
Ruch Chorzów (Poland)	0–4	(East Germany) Dynamo Dresden	0–1	0–3
Borussia Mönchengladbach (West Germany)	6–1	(Denmark) Hvidovre	3–0	3–1
Frem (Denmark)	0–9	(Netherlands) Twente	0–5	0–4
Grasshoppers (Switzerland)	3–7	(Soviet Union) Ararat Yerevan	1–3	2–4
Feyenoord (Netherlands)	5–5 (a)	(Socialist Federal Republic of Yugoslavia) OFK Beograd	4–3	1–2
Tottenham Hotspur (England)	4–1	(Greece) Olympiacos	4–0	0–1
Inter Milan (Italy)	4–2	(Sweden) Norrköping	2–2	2–0
Las Palmas (Spain)	3–2	(Czechoslovakia) Slovan Bratislava	2–2	1–0
Vitória de Setúbal (Portugal)	2–2 (a)	(Italy) Fiorentina	1–0	1–2
Porto (Portugal)	5–3	(Belgium) Club Brugge	3–0	2–3

=== Matches ===
24 October 1972

Viking (Norway)	1–0	(West Germany) Köln
Vold 77'	Report

Stavanger Stadion, Stavanger
Attendance: 12,619
Referee: Anders Mattsson (Finland)
7 November 1972

Köln (West Germany)	9–1	(Norway) Viking
Flohe 10'; Löhr 12', 38', 55', 59', 60'; Cullmann 16'; Kapellmann 46', 64' (pen.)	Report	Paulsen 33'

Müngersdorfer Stadion, Cologne
Attendance: 6,500
Referee: Charles Corver (Netherlands)

Köln won 9–2 on aggregate.

24 October 1972

Liverpool (England)	3–0	(Greece) AEK Athens
Boersma 9'; Cormack 28'; Smith 78' (pen.)	Report

Anfield, Liverpool
Attendance: 31,906
Referee: Joaquim Fernandes Campos (Portugal)
7 November 1972

AEK Athens (Greece)	1–3	(England) Liverpool
Nikolaidis 34' (pen.)	Report	Hughes 17', 44'; Boersma 87'

AEK Stadium, Nea Filadelfeia
Attendance: 19,412
Referee: Petar Kostovski (Yugoslavia)

Liverpool won 6–1 on aggregate.

25 October 1972

Beroe Stara Zagora (Bulgaria)	3–0	(Hungary) Budapest Honvéd
Petkov 46'; Kirov 55'; Dimitrov 57'	Report

Stadion Beroe, Stara Zagora
Attendance: 18,993
Referee: Pavel Kazakov (Soviet Union)
7 November 1972

Budapest Honvéd (Hungary)	1–0	(Bulgaria) Beroe Stara Zagora
Pál 28'	Report

Bozsik József Stadion, Budapest
Attendance: 5,166
Referee: Zdeněk Jelínek (Czechoslovakia)

Beroe Stara Zagora won 3–1 on aggregate.

25 October 1972

BFC Dynamo (East Germany)	3–0	(Bulgaria) Levski-Spartak
Terletzki 9'; Rohde 42'; Netz 65'	Report

Dynamo-Stadion im Sportforum, East Berlin
Attendance: 8,000
Referee: Nicolae Rainea (Romania)
7 November 1972

Levski-Spartak (Bulgaria)	2–0	(East Germany) BFC Dynamo
Zhechev 54', 62'	Report

Stadion Georgi Asparuhov, Sofia
Attendance: 9,577
Referee: Michalakis Kiriakides (Cyprus)

BFC Dynamo won 3–2 on aggregate.

25 October 1972

Red Star Belgrade (Socialist Federal Republic of Yugoslavia)	3–1	(Spain) Valencia
Lazarević 22'; Karasi 45'; Aćimović 77'	Report	Claramunt 48'

Red Star Stadium, Belgrade
Attendance: 20,274
Referee: Ken Burns (England)
8 November 1972

Valencia (Spain)	0–1	(Socialist Federal Republic of Yugoslavia) Red Star Belgrade
	Report	Lazarević 22'

Mestalla Stadium, Valencia
Attendance: 21,234
Referee: Ferdinand Marschall (Austria)

Red Star Belgrade won 4–1 on aggregate.

25 October 1972

CUF Barreiro (Portugal)	1–3	(West Germany) Kaiserslautern
Fernandes 44'	Report	Hošić 30', 52'; Diehl 64'

Estádio Alfredo da Silva, Barreiro
Attendance: 1,475
Referee: Anton Bucheli (Switzerland)
8 November 1972

Kaiserslautern (West Germany)	0–1	(Portugal) CUF Barreiro
	Report	Ribeiro 90'

Betzenbergstadion, Kaiserslautern
Attendance: 5,000
Referee: John Wright Paterson (Scotland)

Kaiserslautern won 3–2 on aggregate.

25 October 1972

Ruch Chorzów (Poland)	0–1	(East Germany) Dynamo Dresden
	Report	Dörner 13'

Stadion Miejski, Chorzów
Attendance: 23,000
Referee: Gheorghi Bakanidze (Soviet Union)
8 November 1972

Dynamo Dresden (East Germany)	3–0	(Poland) Ruch Chorzów
Kreische 45', 66'; Sammer 68'	Report

Rudolf-Harbig-Stadion, Dresden
Attendance: 21,822
Referee: Gusztáv Bircsák (Hungary)

Dynamo Dresden won 4–0 on aggregate.

25 October 1972

Borussia Mönchengladbach (West Germany)	3–0	(Denmark) Hvidovre
Bonhof 42', 85'; Wimmer 60'	Report

Max-Morlock-Stadion, Nuremberg
Attendance: 9,741
Referee: Antoine Queudeville (Luxembourg)
8 November 1972

Hvidovre (Denmark)	1–3	(West Germany) Borussia Mönchengladbach
Nørregaard 52'	Report	Netzer 24', 41'; Heynckes 62'

Hvidovre Stadium, Hvidovre
Attendance: 4,935
Referee: Clive Thomas (Wales)

Borussia Mönchengladbach won 6–1 on aggregate.

25 October 1972

Frem (Denmark)	0–5	(Netherlands) Twente
	Report	Jeuring 1', 7', 55', 60'; Achterberg 83'

Valby Idrætspark, Copenhagen
Attendance: 3,566
Referee: Henry Øberg (Norway)
8 November 1972

Twente (Netherlands)	4–0	(Denmark) Frem
Van der Vall 1'; Jeuring 25', 45'; R. van de Kerkhof 64'	Report

Diekman Stadion, Enschede
Attendance: 9,555
Referee: Ove Dahlberg (Sweden)

Twente won 9–0 on aggregate.

25 October 1972

Grasshoppers (Switzerland)	1–3	(Soviet Union) Ararat Yerevan
Citherlet 90' (pen.)	Report	Kazaryan 28'; Ishtoyan 52'; Andreasyan 58'

Hardturm, Zürich
Attendance: 6,927
Referee: Jacques Colling (Luxembourg)
8 November 1972

Ararat Yerevan (Soviet Union)	4–2	(Switzerland) Grasshoppers
Kazaryan 13', 23'; Markarov 49', 78'	Report	Gröbli 17' (pen.); Müller 65'

Hrazdan Stadium, Yerevan
Attendance: 12,486
Referee: Francis Rion (Belgium)

Ararat Yerevan won 7–3 on aggregate.

25 October 1972

Feyenoord (Netherlands)	4–3	(Socialist Federal Republic of Yugoslavia) OFK Beograd
Van Hanegem 24'; De Jong 26'; Ladinszky 40'; Hasil 63' (pen.)	Report	Santrač 11', 14'; Stojanović 89'

De Kuip, Rotterdam
Attendance: 34,978
Referee: William Gow (Wales)
8 November 1972

OFK Beograd (Socialist Federal Republic of Yugoslavia)	2–1	(Netherlands) Feyenoord
Santrač 24'; Stepanović 61'	Report	De Jong 67'

Omladinski Stadium, Belgrade
Attendance: 13,327
Referee: Francesco Francescon (Italy)

5–5 on aggregate; OFK Beograd won on away goals.

25 October 1972

Tottenham Hotspur (England)	4–0	(Greece) Olympiacos
Pearce 11', 58'; Chivers 35'; Coates 48'	Report

White Hart Lane, London
Attendance: 27,815
Referee: Alfred Delcourt (Belgium)
8 November 1972

Olympiacos (Greece)	1–0	(England) Tottenham Hotspur
Argyroudis 44'	Report

Karaiskakis Stadium, Piraeus
Attendance: 28,281
Referee: Hans-Joachim Weyland (West Germany)

Tottenham Hotspur won 4–1 on aggregate.

25 October 1972

Inter Milan (Italy)	2–2	(Sweden) Norrköping
Massa 2', 48'	Report	Jansson 5'; Kindvall 38'

San Siro, Milan
Attendance: 8,185
Referee: Francisco Lobo (Portugal)
8 November 1972

Norrköping (Sweden)	0–2	(Italy) Inter Milan
	Report	Boninsegna 10'; Magistrelli 68'

Idrottsparken, Norrköping
Attendance: 15,332
Referee: Bobby Davidson (Scotland)

Inter Milan won 4–2 on aggregate.

25 October 1972

Las Palmas (Spain)	2–2	(Czechoslovakia) Slovan Bratislava
Soto 37', 78'	Report	Móder 52'; Zlocha 56'

Estadio Gran Canaria, Las Palmas
Attendance: 12,000
Referee: Iorwerth Jones (Wales)
8 November 1972

Slovan Bratislava (Czechoslovakia)	0–1	(Spain) Las Palmas
	Report	Fernández 73'

Tehelné pole, Bratislava
Attendance: 12,687
Referee: Efstathios Papavasiliou (Greece)

Las Palmas won 3–2 on aggregate.

25 October 1972

Vitória de Setúbal (Portugal)	1–0	(Italy) Fiorentina
Machado 60'	Report

Estádio do Bonfim, Setúbal
Attendance: 4,867
Referee: José María Ortiz de Mendíbil (Spain)
1 November 1972

Fiorentina (Italy)	2–1	(Portugal) Vitória de Setúbal
Clerici 1'; Perego 21'	Report	Duda 28'

Stadio Comunale, Florence
Attendance: 14,073
Referee: Norman Burtenshaw (England)

2–2 on aggregate; Vitória de Setúbal won on away goals.

25 October 1972

Porto (Portugal)	3–0	(Belgium) Club Brugge
Miglietti 6', 49'; Flávio 15'	Report

Estádio das Antas, Porto
Attendance: 21,922
Referee: René Vigliani (France)
8 November 1972

Club Brugge (Belgium)	3–2	(Portugal) Porto
Geels 3'; Thio 45'; Rijnders 65'	Report	Flávio 34'; Miglietti 88'

Klokke Stadion, Bruges
Attendance: 14,246
Referee: John Carpenter (Republic of Ireland)

Porto won 5–3 on aggregate.

== Third round ==
=== Summary ===
Team 1	Agg.	Team 2	1st leg	2nd leg
Köln (West Germany)	0–5	(West Germany) Borussia Mönchengladbach	0–0	0–5
BFC Dynamo (East Germany)	1–3	(England) Liverpool	0–0	1–3
OFK Beograd (Socialist Federal Republic of Yugoslavia)	3–1	(Bulgaria) Beroe Stara Zagora	0–0	3–1
Ararat Yerevan (Soviet Union)	2–2 (4–5 p)	(West Germany) Kaiserslautern	2–0	0–2 (a.e.t.)
Twente (Netherlands)	4–2	(Spain) Las Palmas	3–0	1–2
Tottenham Hotspur (England)	2–1	(Socialist Federal Republic of Yugoslavia) Red Star Belgrade	2–0	0–1
Porto (Portugal)	1–3	(East Germany) Dynamo Dresden	1–2	0–1
Vitória de Setúbal (Portugal)	2–1	(Italy) Inter Milan	2–0	0–1

=== Matches ===
28 November 1972

Köln (West Germany)	0–0	(West Germany) Borussia Mönchengladbach
	Report

Müngersdorfer Stadion, Cologne
Attendance: 11,500
Referee: Sven Jonsson (Sweden)
13 December 1972

Borussia Mönchengladbach (West Germany)	5–0	(West Germany) Köln
Kulik 6'; Vogts 35'; Jensen 64', 79'; Rupp 66'	Report

Bökelbergstadion, Mönchengladbach
Attendance: 16,227
Referee: Gyula Emsberger (Hungary)

Borussia Mönchengladbach won 5–0 on aggregate.

29 November 1972

BFC Dynamo (East Germany)	0–0	(England) Liverpool
	Report 1 Report 2 Report 3

Dynamo-Stadion im Sportforum, East Berlin
Attendance: 15,835-20,000.
Referee: Muzaffer Saridana (Turkey)
13 December 1972

Liverpool (England)	3–1	(East Germany) BFC Dynamo
Boersma 1'; Heighway 25'; Toshack 55'	Report	Netz 8'

Anfield, Liverpool
Attendance: 34,280
Referee: Petar Nikolov (Bulgaria)

Liverpool won 3–1 on aggregate.

29 November 1972

OFK Beograd (Socialist Federal Republic of Yugoslavia)	0–0	(Bulgaria) Beroe Stara Zagora
	Report

Omladinski Stadium, Belgrade
Attendance: 2,470
Referee: Nicolae Petriceanu (Romania)
13 December 1972

Beroe Stara Zagora (Bulgaria)	1–3	(Socialist Federal Republic of Yugoslavia) OFK Beograd
Kirov 43'	Report	Zec 68', 77'; Santrač 87'

Stadion Beroe, Stara Zagora
Attendance: 22,706
Referee: Wolfgang Riedel (East Germany)

OFK Beograd won 3–1 on aggregate.

29 November 1972

Ararat Yerevan (Soviet Union)	2–0	(West Germany) Kaiserslautern
Zanazanyan 37' (pen.); Reinders 57' (o.g.)	Report

Hrazdan Stadium, Yerevan
Attendance: 10,134
Referee: Mario Clematide (Switzerland)
13 December 1972

Kaiserslautern (West Germany)	2–0 (a.e.t.)	(Soviet Union) Ararat Yerevan
Bitz 7'; Huber 75' (pen.)	Report
Penalties
Huber (penalty scored); Seel (penalty missed); Fuchs (penalty scored); Diehl (penalty scored); Müller (penalty scored); Ackermann (penalty scored)	5–4	Andreasyan (penalty scored); Zanazanyan (penalty scored); Ishtoyan (penalty scored); Arutyunyan (penalty missed); Markarov (penalty scored); Gevorkyan (penalty missed)

Fritz-Walter-Stadion, Kaiserslautern
Attendance: 25,000
Referee: Leo van der Kroft (Netherlands)

2–2 on aggregate; Kaiserslautern won on penalties.

29 November 1972

Twente (Netherlands)	3–0	(Spain) Las Palmas
Castellano 17' (o.g.); W. van de Kerkhof 28'; Pahlplatz 80'	Report

Diekman Stadion, Enschede
Attendance: 15,379
Referee: Marian Środecki (Poland)
13 December 1972

Las Palmas (Spain)	2–1	(Netherlands) Twente
Noly 43'; Dévora 69' (pen.)	Report	Huve 89'

Estadio Gran Canaria, Las Palmas
Attendance: 20,000
Referee: Jack Taylor (England)

Twente won 4–2 on aggregate.

29 November 1972

Tottenham Hotspur (England)	2–0	(Socialist Federal Republic of Yugoslavia) Red Star Belgrade
Chivers 26'; Gilzean 63'	Report

White Hart Lane, London
Attendance: 23,958
Referee: Robert Héliès (France)
13 December 1972

Red Star Belgrade (Socialist Federal Republic of Yugoslavia)	1–0	(England) Tottenham Hotspur
Lazarević 48'	Report

Red Star Stadium, Belgrade
Attendance: 65,450
Referee: Sergio Gonella (Italy)

Tottenham Hotspur won 2–1 on aggregate.

29 November 1972

Porto (Portugal)	1–2	(East Germany) Dynamo Dresden
Miglietti 52'	Report	Richter 22'; Kreische 49'

Estádio das Antas, Porto
Attendance: 28,272
Referee: Alistair MacKenzie (Scotland)
13 December 1972

Dynamo Dresden (East Germany)	1–0	(Portugal) Porto
Richter 75'	Report

Rudolf-Harbig-Stadion, Dresden
Attendance: 29,701
Referee: Timoleon Latsios (Greece)

Dynamo Dresden won 3–1 on aggregate.

29 November 1972

Vitória de Setúbal (Portugal)	2–0	(Italy) Inter Milan
Machado 13'; Bini 83' (o.g.)	Report

Estádio do Bonfim, Setúbal
Attendance: 12,292
Referee: Paul Bonett (Malta)
13 December 1972

Inter Milan (Italy)	1–0	(Portugal) Vitória de Setúbal
Boninsegna 37' (pen.)	Report

San Siro, Milan
Attendance: 4,619
Referee: Erich Linemayr (Austria)

Vitória de Setúbal won 2–1 on aggregate.

== Quarter-finals ==
=== Summary ===
Team 1	Agg.	Team 2	1st leg	2nd leg
Kaiserslautern (West Germany)	2–9	(West Germany) Borussia Mönchengladbach	1–2	1–7
OFK Beograd (Socialist Federal Republic of Yugoslavia)	3–4	(Netherlands) Twente	3–2	0–2
Liverpool (England)	3–0	(East Germany) Dynamo Dresden	2–0	1–0
Tottenham Hotspur (England)	2–2 (a)	(Portugal) Vitória de Setúbal	1–0	1–2

=== Matches ===
6 March 1973

Kaiserslautern (West Germany)	1–2	(West Germany) Borussia Mönchengladbach
Toppmöller 22'	Report	Danner 14'; Jensen 26'

Fritz-Walter-Stadion, Kaiserslautern
Attendance: 20,000
Referee: Gerhard Schulenburg (West Germany)
20 March 1973

Borussia Mönchengladbach (West Germany)	7–1	(West Germany) Kaiserslautern
Jensen 7', 85'; Netzer 42'; Heynckes 53' (pen.), 60', 82'; Danner 90' (pen.)	Report	Seel 26'

Bökelbergstadion, Mönchengladbach
Attendance: 18,117
Referee: Kurt Tschenscher (West Germany)

Borussia Mönchengladbach won 9–2 on aggregate.

7 March 1973

OFK Beograd (Socialist Federal Republic of Yugoslavia)	3–2	(Netherlands) Twente
Zec 30', 44', 74'	Report	Van der Vall 17'; Jeuring 60'

Omladinski Stadium, Belgrade
Attendance: 14,496
Referee: Alistair McKenzie (Scotland)
21 March 1973

Twente (Netherlands)	2–0	(Socialist Federal Republic of Yugoslavia) OFK Beograd
Jeuring 22', 45'	Report

Diekman Stadion, Enschede
Attendance: 16,000
Referee: Fernando Leite (Portugal)

Twente won 4–3 on aggregate.

7 March 1973

Liverpool (England)	2–0	(East Germany) Dynamo Dresden
Hall 25'; Boersma 60'	Report

Anfield, Liverpool
Attendance: 33,330
Referee: Paul Schiller (Austria)
21 March 1973

Dynamo Dresden (East Germany)	0–1	(England) Liverpool
	Report	Keegan 53'

Rudolf-Harbig-Stadion, Dresden
Attendance: 33,634
Referee: Arie van Gemert (Netherlands)

Liverpool won 3–0 on aggregate.

7 March 1973

Tottenham Hotspur (England)	1–0	(Portugal) Vitória de Setúbal
Evans 80'	Report

White Hart Lane, London
Attendance: 30,469
Referee: Gusztáv Bircsák (Hungary)
21 March 1973

Vitória de Setúbal (Portugal)	2–1	(England) Tottenham Hotspur
Henrique Campora 20'; Torres 65'	Report	Chivers 68'

Estádio do Bonfim, Setubal
Attendance: 27,000
Referee: Günter Männig (East Germany)

2–2 on aggregate; Tottenham won on away goals.

== Semi-finals ==
=== Summary ===
Team 1	Agg.	Team 2	1st leg	2nd leg
Liverpool (England)	2–2 (a)	(England) Tottenham Hotspur	1–0	1–2
Borussia Mönchengladbach (West Germany)	5–1	(Netherlands) Twente	3–0	2–1

=== Matches ===
10 April 1973
20:30 (19:30 BST)

Liverpool (England)	1–0	(England) Tottenham Hotspur
Lindsay 26'	Report

Anfield, Liverpool
Attendance: 42,174
Referee: Bertil Lööw (Sweden)
25 April 1973
20:30 (19:30 BST)

Tottenham Hotspur (England)	2–1	(England) Liverpool
Peters 49', 62'	Report	Heighway 54'

White Hart Lane, London
Attendance: 46,919
Referee: Aurelio Angonese (Italy)

2–2 on aggregate; Liverpool won on away goals.

11 April 1973
19:30

Borussia Mönchengladbach (Germany)	3–0	(Netherlands) Twente
Heynckes 32', 60' (pen.); Jensen 51'	Report

Bökelbergstadion, Mönchengladbach
Attendance: 34,110
Referee: Petar Hristov (Bulgaria)
25 April 1973
19:30

Twente (Netherlands)	1–2	(Germany) Borussia Mönchengladbach
Notten 81'	Report	Drost 13' (o.g.); Rupp 27'

Diekman Stadion, Enschede
Attendance: 22,250
Referee: John Carpenter (Republic of Ireland)

Borussia Mönchengladbach won 5–1 on aggregate.

== Final ==
=== Summary ===
Team 1	Agg.	Team 2	1st leg	2nd leg
Liverpool (England)	3–2	(West Germany) Borussia Mönchengladbach	3–0	0–2

=== Matches ===
10 May 1973

Liverpool (England)	3–0	(West Germany) Borussia Mönchengladbach
Keegan 21', 32'; Lloyd 61'	Report

Anfield, Liverpool
Attendance: 41,169
Referee: Erich Linemayr (Austria)
23 May 1973

Borussia Mönchengladbach (West Germany)	2–0	(England) Liverpool
Heynckes 31', 40'	Report

Bökelbergstadion, Mönchengladbach
Attendance: 34,905
Referee: Pavel Kazakov (Soviet Union)

Liverpool won 3–2 on aggregate.
