= 1972–73 in Swiss football =

Football in Switzerland
- Season: 1972–73

Men's football
- Nationalliga A: Basel
- Nationalliga B: Xamax
- 1. Liga: 1. Liga champions: FC Nordstern Basel; Group West: FC Monthey; Group Cenral: FC Nordstern Basel; Group South and East: FC Tössfeld
- 1972–73 Swiss Cup: Zürich
- 1972 Swiss League Cup: Basel

Women's football
- Swiss Women's Super League: DFC Aarau

The following is a summary of the 1972–73 season of competitive football in Switzerland.

== Nationalliga A ==
=== Final league table ===
Pos	Team	Pld	W	D	L	GF	GA	GD	Pts	Qualification or relegation
1	Basel	26	17	5	4	57	30	+27	39	Champions qualified for 1973–74 European Cup
2	Grasshopper Club	26	14	7	5	54	32	+22	35	Qualified for 1973–74 UEFA Cup and entered 1973 Intertoto Cup
3	Sion	26	13	7	6	35	30	+5	33	Qualified for 1973–74 UEFA Cup
4	Servette	26	14	3	9	41	23	+18	31	
5	Winterthur	26	12	6	8	40	29	+11	30	Entered 1973 Intertoto Cup
6	Lausanne-Sport	26	11	6	9	46	27	+19	28	
7	Zürich	26	10	8	8	38	33	+5	28	Swiss Cup winners qualified for 1973–74 Cup Winners' Cup and entered 1973 Intertoto Cup
8	Lugano	26	9	9	8	31	30	+1	27	Entered 1973 Intertoto Cup
9	Young Boys	26	9	5	12	39	40	−1	23	
10	La Chaux-de-Fonds	26	8	7	11	30	43	−13	23	
11	Chiasso	26	8	5	13	21	48	−27	21	
12	St. Gallen	26	7	5	14	31	49	−18	19	
13	Fribourg	26	4	7	15	24	43	−19	15	Relegated to 1973–74 Nationalliga B
14	Grenchen	26	4	4	18	23	53	−30	12	Relegated to 1973–74 Nationalliga B

Source: rsssf.com
Rules for classification: 1) Points; 2) Goal difference within the league, however with play-off for qualifiers;

== Nationalliga B ==
=== League table ===
Pos	Team	Pld	W	D	L	GF	GA	GD	Pts	Qualification or relegation
1	Xamax	26	19	5	2	72	21	+51	43	NLB Champions and promoted to 1973–74 Nationalliga A
2	CS Chênois	26	15	7	4	44	24	+20	37	To promotion play-off
3	Luzern	26	15	7	4	60	26	+34	37	To promotion play-off
4	FC Biel-Bienne	26	11	6	9	45	35	+10	28	
5	Vevey-Sports	26	11	5	10	50	40	+10	27	
6	Mendrisiostar	26	9	9	8	30	34	−4	27	
7	FC Young Fellows Zürich	26	11	4	11	35	37	−2	26	
8	Etoile Carouge FC	26	8	8	10	36	51	−15	24	
9	FC Wettingen	26	8	7	11	30	44	−14	23	
10	FC Aarau	26	7	8	11	29	42	−13	22	
11	FC Martigny-Sports	26	6	9	11	27	45	−18	21	
12	AC Bellinzona	26	7	6	13	30	41	−11	20	
13	SC Brühl	26	6	6	14	43	58	−15	18	Relegated to 1973–74 1. Liga
14	SC Buochs	26	3	5	18	26	59	−33	11	Relegated to 1973–74 1. Liga

Source: rsssf.com
Rules for classification: 1) Points; 2) Goal difference within the league, however with play-off for qualifiers;

=== Promotion play-off ===
Team 1	Score	Team 2
Chênois	2–1 (a.e.t.)	Luzern

Chênois won and were promoted to 1973–74 Nationalliga A. Luzern remained in division.

== 1. Liga ==
=== Group West ===
Pos	Team	Pld	W	D	L	GF	GA	GD	Pts	Qualification or relegation
1	FC Monthey	24	13	7	4	48	21	+27	33	Play-off to Nationalliga B
2	FC Dürrenast	24	11	8	5	43	31	+12	30	Play-off to Nationalliga B
3	FC Raron	24	11	5	8	42	36	+6	27	
4	FC Stade Nyonnais	24	11	4	9	43	31	+12	26	
5	FC Le Locle	24	9	7	8	43	38	+5	25	
6	Yverdon-Sport FC	24	10	5	9	35	38	−3	25	
7	FC Meyrin	24	9	7	8	26	33	−7	25	
8	Central Fribourg	24	10	4	10	45	43	+2	24	
9	FC Thun	24	10	4	10	35	46	−11	24	
10	Urania Genève Sport	24	7	9	8	34	37	−3	23	
11	ASI Audax-Friul	24	8	4	12	35	41	−6	20	
12	FC Fontainemelon	24	5	6	13	33	47	−14	16	Relegation to 2. Liga Interregional
13	FC Renens	24	3	8	13	27	47	−20	14	Relegation to 2. Liga Interregional

Source: RSSSF
Rules for classification: 1) Points; 2) Goal difference within the league, but decider play-off for qualifiers; 3) Goals scored; 4) Head-to-head points; 5) Away goals scored; 6) Draw.

=== Group Central ===
Pos	Team	Pld	W	D	L	GF	GA	GD	Pts	Qualification or relegation
1	FC Nordstern Basel	24	16	3	5	44	22	+22	35	Play-off to Nationalliga B
2	SR Delémont	24	13	4	7	41	29	+12	30	Play-off to Nationalliga B
3	SC Kriens	24	11	7	6	46	32	+14	29	
4	FC Solothurn	24	8	11	5	39	33	+6	27	
5	FC Bern	24	8	9	7	47	47	0	25	
6	FC Baden	24	9	6	9	31	35	−4	24	
7	FC Porrentruy	24	9	6	9	29	34	−5	24	
8	FC Moutier	24	7	9	8	46	39	+7	23	
9	FC Emmenbrücke	24	9	4	11	42	40	+2	22	
10	FC Laufen	24	8	6	10	37	40	−3	22	
11	FC Concordia Basel	24	7	4	13	37	52	−15	18	Play-out against relegation
12	FC Turgi	24	5	8	11	27	43	−16	18	Play-out against relegation
13	FC Breite Basel	24	5	5	14	33	53	−20	15	Relegation to 2. Liga Interregional

Source: RSSSF
Rules for classification: 1) Points; 2) Goal difference within the league, but decider play-off for qualifiers; 3) Goals scored; 4) Head-to-head points; 5) Away goals scored; 6) Draw.

==== Decider for eleventh place ====
The decider was played on 3 June in Solothurn.

Team 1	Score	Team 2
FC Concordia Basel	2–2 (a.e.t.)	FC Turgi

The game was drawn, however, at this period in time, the extra-time as match extension had not yet been introduced. FC Concordia Basel were declaired winners due to the better goal-average of the regular season and, therefore, they remained in the division. FC Turgi were relegated to 2. Liga Interregional.

=== Group South and East ===
Pos	Team	Pld	W	D	L	GF	GA	GD	Pts	Qualification or relegation
1	FC Tössfeld	24	13	8	3	45	22	+23	34	Play-off to Nationalliga B
2	SC Zug	24	12	5	7	39	33	+6	29	Play-off to Nationalliga B
3	FC Locarno	24	9	9	6	41	27	+14	27	
4	FC Blue Stars Zürich	24	9	8	7	34	22	+12	26	
5	FC Uzwil	24	9	7	8	36	39	−3	25	
6	FC Gossau	24	9	6	9	35	34	+1	24	
7	FC Red Star Zürich	24	7	8	9	28	28	0	22	
8	US Giubiasco	24	6	10	8	21	28	−7	22	
9	FC Frauenfeld	24	7	8	9	32	40	−8	22	
10	FC Chur	24	6	9	9	27	36	−9	21	
11	FC Rapid Lugano	24	7	7	10	30	41	−11	21	
12	FC Vaduz	24	7	6	11	38	44	−6	20	Relegation to 2. Liga Interregional
13	AS Gambarogno	24	6	7	11	31	43	−12	19	Relegation to 2. Liga Interregional

Source: RSSSF (which contains a mistake by SC Zug, number of wins +1, number of draws -1, but points are correctly stated)
Rules for classification: 1) Points; 2) Goal difference within the league, but decider play-off for qualifiers; 3) Goals scored; 4) Head-to-head points; 5) Away goals scored; 6) Draw.

=== Promotion play-off ===
The three group winners played a two legged tie against one of the runners-up to decide the three finalists. The games were played on 3 and 10 June.

==== Qualification round ====
Team 1	Score	Team 2
FC Nordstern Basel	3–3	SC Zug
SC Zug	0–6	FC Nordstern Basel

FC Nordstern Basel win 9–3 on aggregate and continue to the finals.

Team 1	Score	Team 2
FC Tössfeld	5–1	FC Dürrenast
FC Dürrenast	3–1	FC Tössfeld

FC Tössfeld win 6–4 on aggregate and continue to the finals.

Team 1	Score	Team 2
FC Monthey	0–1	SR Delémont
SR Delémont	3–1	FC Monthey

SR Delémont win 4–1 on aggregate and continue to the finals.

==== Final round ====
The three first round winners competed in a single round-robin to decide the two promotion slots. The games were played on 17, 24 June and 1 July.

Pos	Team	Pld	W	D	L	GF	GA	GD	Pts	NOR	TÖS	DEL
1	FC Nordstern Basel	2	1	0	1	2	1	+1	2	—	2–0	—
2	FC Tössfeld	2	1	0	1	3	2	+1	2	—	—	3–0
3	SR Delémont	2	1	0	1	1	3	−2	2	1–0	—	—

Source: RSSSF

FC Nordstern Basel are champions, because they beat Tössfeld in the head-to-head and Tössfeld are runners-up. These two teams are promoted.

== Swiss Cup ==
The competition was played in a knockout system. In the case of a draw, extra time was played. If the teams were still level after extra time, the match was replayed at the away team's ground. Here, in case of a draw after extra time, the replay was to be decided with a penalty shoot-out. The quarter- and semi-finals were played as two legged rounds, home and away. The final was held in the Wankdorf Stadium in Bern.

=== Early rounds ===
The routes of the finalists to the final were:

- Third round: NLA teams with a bye.
- Fourth round: Bellinzona-Zürich 1:4. Basel-Martigny 6.0.
- Fifth round: Zürich-Lausanne 2:1. YB-Basel 0:4.
- Quarterfinals: First leg: Zürich-Etoile Carouge 1:1. Return leg: Etoile Carouge-Zürich 0:4 (agg. 1:5). Chiasso-Basel 0:2. Basel-Chiasso 5:3 (agg. 7:3).
- Semifinals: Winterthur-Zürich 1:1. Zürich-Winterthur 2:1 (a.e.t.). (agg. 3:2). Biel/Bienne-Basel 0:1. Basel-Biel/Bienne 5:1 (agg. 6:1).

=== Final ===
Easter Monday
23 April 1973
14:30

Zürich	2–0 (a.e.t.)	Basel
Marti 92'; Künzli 101'	FCB summary FCZ summary Summary

Wankdorf, Bern
Attendance: 45,000
Referee: (Switzerland) Roland Keller Bern

== Swiss League Cup ==
The 1972 League Cup was played as a pre-season tournament. The semi-finals and the final itself, however, was played after the season had commenced. The early stage was a group stage. The finalists Basel and Winterthur had a bye in this stage and they joined in the first round on 5 August.

=== Early rounds ===
The routes of the finalists to the final were:

==== Round 1 ====
Team 1	Score	Team 2
FC Basel	8–0	Servette FC Genève
FC Winterthur	4–1	FC Lugano

==== Quarter-finals ====
Team 1	Score	Team 2
FC Basel	2–1 (aet)	Lausanne-Sports
Grasshopper Club Zürich	1–2	FC Winterthur

==== Semi-finals ====
Team 1	Score	Team 2
FC Basel	6–1	FC Sion
FC Luzern	0–2	FC Winterthur

=== Final ===
11 November 1972
14:30
Final

Basel	4–1	FC Winterthur
Hitzfeld 6' (1:0); Hitzfeld 22' (2:0); Balmer 40' (3:1); Hitzfeld 90' (pen. 4:1)	FCB summary RSSSF summary	25' (2:1) Nielsen

Letzigrund, Zürich
Attendance: 7,600
Referee: (Switzerland) Jean Dubach Nidau

== Swiss Clubs in Europe ==
- Basel as 1971–72 Nationalliga A champions: 1972–73 European Cup
- Zürich as 1971–72 Swiss Cup winners: 1972–73 Cup Winners' Cup and entered 1972 Intertoto Cup
- Grasshopper Club as league third placed team: 1972–73 UEFA Cup and entered 1972 Intertoto Cup
- Lausanne-Sport as league fourth placed team: 1972–73 UEFA Cup
- Young Boys: entered 1972 Intertoto Cup
- Winterthur: entered 1972 Intertoto Cup

=== Basel ===
==== European Cup ====
===== First round =====
13 September 1972 First leg	Újpesti Dózsa (Hungary)	2–0	(Switzerland) Basel	Újpest
17:30	Bene (yellow card) 39'; Horváth 57'; Zámbó 60'	UEFA summary FCB summary	(yellow card) 88' Ramseier	Stadium: Ferenc Szusza Stadium; Attendance: 7,000; Referee: (Austria) Paul Schiller

27 September 1972 Second leg	Basel (Switzerland)	3–2	(Hungary) Újpesti Dózsa	Basel
20:00	Hasler 65' (1:1); Balmer 75' (2:1); Balmer 83' (3:1)	UEFA summary FCB summary	(yellow card) 32' E. Dunai; 46' (0:1) Bene; (yellow card) 58' P. Juhász; 89' (3:2) Bene	Stadium: St. Jakob Stadium; Attendance: 16,000; Referee: (England) Walker

Újpesti Dózsa won 4–3 on aggregate.

=== Zürich ===
==== Cup Winners' Cup ====
===== First round =====
13 September 1972 First leg	Zürich (Switzerland)	1–1	(Wales) Wrexham	Letzigrund, Zürich
20:15	Kuhn (yellow card) 34'; Künzli 47'	FCZ summary	48' Kinsey	Attendance: 6,500; Referee: (Socialist Federal Republic of Yugoslavia) Petar Kostovski

27 September 1972 Second leg	Wrexham (Wales)	2–1	(Switzerland) Zürich	Racecourse Ground, Wrexham
	May (yellow card); Mostyn (yellow card); Ashcroft 63'; Sutton 74'	FCZ summary	(yellow card) Zigerlig; 48' Martinelli	Attendance: 18,000; Referee: (Norway) Rolf Nyhus

Wrexham won 3–2 on aggregate

==== Intertoto Cup ====
===== Group 5 =====
Pos	Team	Pld	W	D	L	GF	GA	GD	Pts	SLO	FIR	ZÜR	DJU
1	(Czechoslovakia) Slovan Bratislava	6	5	0	1	16	7	+9	10	—	5–0	0–3	4–1
2	(Austria) First Vienna	6	2	2	2	9	10	−1	6	0–1	—	2–2	3–0
3	(Switzerland) Zürich	6	1	3	2	8	8	0	5	1–3	1–1	—	0–0
4	(Sweden) Djurgården	6	1	1	4	6	14	−8	3	2–3	1–3	2–1	—

Source: mogiel.net
Rules for classification: 1) Points; 2) Goal difference; 3) Goals scored; 4) Head-to-head points; 5) Away goals scored; 6) Draw.

Results

24 June 1972 Round 1	Zürich (Switzerland)	0–0	(Sweden) Djurgården	Letzigrund, Zürich
18:00		FCZ summary		Attendance: 1,600; Referee: (Switzerland) Mario Clematide (Zollikofen)

1 July 1972 Round 2	First Vienna (Austria)	2–2	(Switzerland) Zürich	Red Star-Platz, Vienna
	Miss 21' (1:0); Hevera 26' (2:0)	FCZ summary	71' (2:1) Schweizer; 81' (2:2) Schweizer	Attendance: 2,000; Referee: (Austria) Paul Drabek

8 July 1972 Round 3	Slovan Bratislava (Czechoslovakia)	0–3	(Switzerland) Zürich	Tehelné pole, Bratislava
		FCZ summary	2' (0:1) Künzli; 64' (0:2) Künzli; 65' (0:3) Künzli	Attendance: 4,000

15 July 1972 Round 4	Zürich (Switzerland)	1–1	(Austria) First Vienna	Letzigrund, Zürich
	Künzli 45' (1:0)	FCZ summary	66' (1:1) Traxler; (yellow card) Hevera	Attendance: 3,500; Referee: (Switzerland) Jean Dubach (Nidau)

22 July 1972 Round 5	Zürich (Switzerland)	1–3	(Czechoslovakia) Slovan Bratislava	Letzigrund, Zürich
	Künzli 25' (1:0)	FCZ summary	42' (1:1) Pekárik; 45' (1:2) Pekárik; 87' (1:3) Čapkovič	Attendance: 4,100; Referee: (Switzerland) Hans Wieland (Grenchen)

29 July 1972 Round 6	Djurgården (Sweden)	2–1	(Switzerland) Zürich	Stockholm
	Svensson 16' (1:0); Svensson 71' (2:1)	FCZ summary	48' (1:1) Künzli	Attendance: 950; Referee: (Sweden) Sven Jonsson

=== Grasshopper Club ===
==== UEFA Cup ====
===== First round =====
13 September 1972 First leg	Nîmes (France)	1–2	(Switzerland) Grasshoppers	Stade Jean-Bouin, Nîmes
	Dell'Oste 30'	Report	Müller 28'; Winiger 67'	Attendance: 8,569; Referee: Joaquim Fernandes Campos (Portugal)

26 September 1972 Second leg	Grasshoppers (Switzerland)	2–1	(France) Nîmes	Hardturm, Zürich
	Müller 19'; Citherlet 37' (pen.)	Report	Adams 49'	Attendance: 4,800; Referee: Jan Keizer (Netherlands)

Grasshoppers won 4–2 on aggregate.

25 October 1972 First leg	Grasshoppers (Switzerland)	1–3	(Soviet Union) Ararat Yerevan	Hardturm, Zürich
	Citherlet 90' (pen.)	Report	Kazaryan 28'; Ishtoyan 52'; Andreasyan 58'	Attendance: 6,927; Referee: Jacques Colling (Luxembourg)

8 November 1972 Second leg	Ararat Yerevan (Soviet Union)	4–2	(Switzerland) Grasshoppers	Hrazdan Stadium, Yerevan
	Kazaryan 13', 23'; Markarov 49', 78'	Report	Gröbli 17' (pen.); Müller 65'	Attendance: 12,486; Referee: Francis Rion (Belgium)

Ararat Yerevan won 7–3 on aggregate.

==== Intertoto Cup ====
===== Group 7 =====
Pos	Team	Pld	W	D	L	GF	GA	GD	Pts	HAN	GCZ	STA	HVI
1	(West Germany) Hannover	6	4	1	1	15	10	+5	9	—	3–2	4–1	3–2
2	(Switzerland) Grasshopper Club	6	2	3	1	12	7	+5	7	1–1	—	1–1	1–1
3	(Poland) Stal Mielec	6	3	1	2	13	12	+1	7	3–2	1–4	—	5–0
4	(Denmark) Hvidovre	6	0	1	5	5	16	−11	1	1–2	0–3	1–2	—

Source: mogiel.net
Rules for classification: 1) Points; 2) Goal difference; 3) Goals scored; 4) Head-to-head points; 5) Away goals scored; 6) Draw.

=== Lausanne-Sport ===
==== UEFA Cup ====
===== First round =====
13 September 1972 First leg	Red Star Belgrade (Socialist Federal Republic of Yugoslavia)	5–1	(Switzerland) Lausanne-Sport	Red Star Stadium, Belgrade
	Karasi 17'; Lazarević 25', 55', 88'; Janković 67'	Report	Grahn 63'	Attendance: 3,555; Referee: Ertuğrul Dilek (Turkey)

27 September 1972 Second leg	Lausanne-Sport (Switzerland)	3–2	(Socialist Federal Republic of Yugoslavia) Red Star Belgrade	Stade Olympique de la Pontaise, Lausanne
	Cucinotta 28'; Grahn 80'; García 89'	Report	Janković 14', 44'	Attendance: 8,000; Referee: Pablo Sánchez Ibáñez (Spain)

Red Star Belgrade won 7–4 on aggregate.

=== Young Boys ===
==== Intertoto Cup ====
===== Group 3 =====
Pos	Team	Pld	W	D	L	GF	GA	GD	Pts	STE	WIS	YB	ÅTV
1	(France) Saint-Étienne	6	4	2	0	12	2	+10	10	—	0–0	0–0	3–0
2	(Poland) Wisła Kraków	6	2	3	1	12	3	+9	7	0–1	—	8–0	1–1
3	(Switzerland) Young Boys	6	1	2	3	4	17	−13	4	0–5	1–1	—	2–1
4	(Sweden) Åtvidaberg	6	1	1	4	6	12	−6	3	2–3	0–2	2–1	—

Source: mogiel.net
Rules for classification: 1) Points; 2) Goal difference; 3) Goals scored; 4) Head-to-head points; 5) Away goals scored; 6) Draw.

=== Winterthur ===
==== Intertoto Cup ====
===== Group 2 =====
Pos	Team	Pld	W	D	L	GF	GA	GD	Pts	NOR	SAL	WIN	GWA
1	(Sweden) Norrköping	6	3	2	1	10	7	+3	8	—	2–1	0–2	1–1
2	Austria Salzburg	6	4	0	2	11	9	+2	8	2–4	—	3–2	2–0
3	(Switzerland) Winterthur	6	2	2	2	9	8	+1	6	1–1	1–2	—	3–2
4	(Poland) Górnik Wałbrzych	6	0	2	4	3	9	−6	2	0–2	0–1	0–0	—

Source: mogiel.net
Rules for classification: 1) Points; 2) Goal difference; 3) Goals scored; 4) Head-to-head points; 5) Away goals scored; 6) Draw.

== Sources ==
- Switzerland 1972–73 at RSSSF
- League Cup finals at RSSSF
- European Competitions 1972–73 at RSSSF.com
- Cup finals at Fussball-Schweiz
- Intertoto history at Pawel Mogielnicki's Page
- Josef Zindel (2018). FC Basel 1893. Die ersten 125 Jahre (in German). Basel: Friedrich Reinhardt Verlag. ISBN 978-3-7245-2305-5.

Preceded by 1971–72	Seasons in Swiss football	Succeeded by 1973–74
