= 1953 in association football =

The following are the football (soccer) events of the year 1953 throughout the world.

== Events ==
- April 19 – The Netherlands plays its 200th official match in history, losing 0–2 in a friendly against neighbouring Belgium.
- May 2 – Blackpool win the FA Cup Final, their only major championship title to date, beating Bolton Wanderers 4–3, despite the score being 1–3 with a few minutes remaining.
- November 25 – England v Hungary (1953). It was the first time England had lost at Wembley Stadium home venue to a nation outside the British Isles.
- Dynamo Dresden was founded.

== Winners club national championship ==
- Argentina: River Plate
- Belgium: R.F.C. Liégeois
- Colombia: Millonarios FC
- Denmark: KB
- East Germany: Dynamo Dresden
- England: Arsenal F.C.
- France: Stade de Reims
- Greece: Panathinaikos
- Italy: Internazionale Milano F.C.
- Ireland: Shelbourne F.C.
- Mexico: Tampico
- Netherlands: RCH
- Northern Ireland: Glentoran F.C.
- Poland: Ruch Chorzów
- Portugal: Sporting
- Romania: CCA București
- Scotland: Rangers F.C.
- Spain: FC Barcelona
- Sweden: Malmö FF
- West Germany: 1. FC Kaiserslautern
- USSR: FC Spartak Moscow

== International tournaments ==
- 1953 British Home Championship (October 4, 1952 – April 18, 1953)

Shared by England & Scotland

- 1953 Small Club World Cup (February 11, 1953 – February 21, 1953)

Millonarios FC Colombia

- 1953 Small Club World Cup (July 11, 1953 – August 2, 1953)

Corinthians Brazil

- South American Championship in Peru (February 22 – April 1, 1953)
  1. Paraguay
  2. Brazil
  3. Uruguay

== Births ==
- January 1 – Peter John Taylor, English footballer and manager
- January 4 – Norberto Alonso, Argentinean footballer
- January 6 – Manfred Kaltz, German footballer
- January 28 – Paul Crampton, English former footballer
- March 1 – Carlos Queiroz, Portuguese manager
- March 3 – Zico, Brazilian footballer and manager
- March 11 – László Bölöni, Romanian footballer and manager
- April 1 – Pavol Biroš, Czech footballer (died 2020)
- April 1 – Alberto Zaccheroni, Italian manager
- April 10 – Søren Busk, Danish footballer
- April 21 – Hans Verèl, Dutch footballer and manager (died 2019)
- April 28 – Brian Greenhoff, English footballer (died 2013)
- May 6 – Graeme Souness, Scottish footballer and manager
- May 22 – Paul Mariner, English footballer (died 2021)
- May 25 – Daniel Passarella, Argentinean footballer and manager
- May 25 – Gaetano Scirea, Italian footballer (died 1989)
- June 19 – Jan van Deinsen, Dutch footballer
- July 20 – Ladislav Jurkemik, Slovak footballer
- July 22 – René Vandereycken, Belgian footballer and manager
- July 26 – Felix Magath, German footballer and manager
- August 31 – Roger Mostyn, Welsh former professional footballer
- September 15 – Gerrie Kleton, Dutch footballer (died 2006)
- September 24 – Ray Fulton, English former professional footballer
- September 27 – Claudio Gentile, Italian footballer
- October 14 – Aldo Maldera, Italian footballer (died 2012)
- October 16 – Paulo Roberto Falcão, Brazilian footballer and manager
- October 26 – Stuart Senior, English former footballer
- November 29 – Huub Stevens, Dutch footballer and manager
- December 4 – Jean-Marie Pfaff, Belgian footballer
- December 9 – Jan Byś, Polish footballer (died 2026)
- December 18 – Kevin Beattie, English footballer (died 2018)
