= 1972 Intertoto Cup =

European football tournament

Tournament details
- Teams: 32

Final positions
- Champions: Group winners Nitra; Norrköping; Saint-Étienne; Slavia Prague; Slovan Bratislava; Eintracht Braunschweig; Hannover; VÖEST Linz

Tournament statistics
- Matches played: 96

In the 1972 Intertoto Cup no knock-out rounds were contested, and therefore no winner was declared.

== Group stage ==
The teams were divided into eight groups of four teams each.

=== Group 1 ===
Pos	Team	Pld	W	D	L	GF	GA	GD	Pts	NIT	WAC	KB	ÖRG
1	(Czechoslovakia) Nitra	6	6	0	0	19	5	+14	12	—	4–1	2–0	3–0
2	(Austria) SSW Innsbruck	6	2	0	4	12	13	−1	4	0–1	—	3–1	5–1
3	(Denmark) KB	6	2	0	4	10	13	−3	4	2–3	2–1	—	2–4
4	(Sweden) Örgryte	6	2	0	4	11	21	−10	4	2–6	4–2	0–3	—

Source: mogiel.net
Rules for classification: 1) Points; 2) Goal difference; 3) Goals scored; 4) Head-to-head points; 5) Away goals scored; 6) Draw.

=== Group 2 ===
Pos	Team	Pld	W	D	L	GF	GA	GD	Pts	NOR	SAL	WIN	GWA
1	(Sweden) Norrköping	6	3	2	1	10	7	+3	8	—	2–1	0–2	1–1
2	Austria Salzburg	6	4	0	2	11	9	+2	8	2–4	—	3–2	2–0
3	(Switzerland) Winterthur	6	2	2	2	9	8	+1	6	1–1	1–2	—	3–2
4	(Poland) Górnik Wałbrzych	6	0	2	4	3	9	−6	2	0–2	0–1	0–0	—

Source: mogiel.net
Rules for classification: 1) Points; 2) Goal difference; 3) Goals scored; 4) Head-to-head points; 5) Away goals scored; 6) Draw.

=== Group 3 ===
Pos	Team	Pld	W	D	L	GF	GA	GD	Pts	STE	WIS	YB	ÅTV
1	(France) Saint-Étienne	6	4	2	0	12	2	+10	10	—	0–0	0–0	3–0
2	(Poland) Wisła Kraków	6	2	3	1	12	3	+9	7	0–1	—	8–0	1–1
3	(Switzerland) Young Boys	6	1	2	3	4	17	−13	4	0–5	1–1	—	2–1
4	(Sweden) Åtvidaberg	6	1	1	4	6	12	−6	3	2–3	0–2	2–1	—

Source: mogiel.net
Rules for classification: 1) Points; 2) Goal difference; 3) Goals scored; 4) Head-to-head points; 5) Away goals scored; 6) Draw.

=== Group 4 ===
Pos	Team	Pld	W	D	L	GF	GA	GD	Pts	SLA	MAL	NIC	AAC
1	(Czechoslovakia) Slavia Prague	6	2	3	1	9	5	+4	7	—	0–0	4–0	1–0
2	(Sweden) Malmö FF	6	3	1	2	15	12	+3	7	2–1	—	4–1	5–1
3	(France) Nice	6	2	1	3	11	14	−3	5	2–2	6–2	—	2–0
4	(West Germany) Aachen	6	2	1	3	7	11	−4	5	1–1	3–2	2–0	—

Source: mogiel.net
Rules for classification: 1) Points; 2) Goal difference; 3) Goals scored; 4) Head-to-head points; 5) Away goals scored; 6) Draw.

=== Group 5 ===
Pos	Team	Pld	W	D	L	GF	GA	GD	Pts	SLO	FIR	ZÜR	DJU
1	(Czechoslovakia) Slovan Bratislava	6	5	0	1	16	7	+9	10	—	5–0	0–3	4–1
2	(Austria) First Vienna	6	2	2	2	9	10	−1	6	0–1	—	2–2	3–0
3	(Switzerland) Zürich	6	1	3	2	8	8	0	5	1–3	1–1	—	0–0
4	(Sweden) Djurgården	6	1	1	4	6	14	−8	3	2–3	1–3	2–1	—

Source: mogiel.net
Rules for classification: 1) Points; 2) Goal difference; 3) Goals scored; 4) Head-to-head points; 5) Away goals scored; 6) Draw.

Matches

24 June 1972
18:00
Round 1

Zürich (Switzerland)	0–0	(Sweden) Djurgården
	FCZ summary

Letzigrund, Zürich
Attendance: 1,600
Referee: (Switzerland) Mario Clematide (Zollikofen)

1 July 1972
Round 2

First Vienna (Austria)	2–2	(Switzerland) Zürich
Miss 21' (1:0); Hevera 26' (2:0)	FCZ summary	71' (2:1) Schweizer; 81' (2:2) Schweizer

Red Star-Platz, Vienna
Attendance: 2,000
Referee: (Austria) Paul Drabek

8 July 1972
Round 3

Slovan Bratislava (Czechoslovakia)	0–3	(Switzerland) Zürich
	FCZ summary	2' (0:1) Künzli; 64' (0:2) Künzli; 65' (0:3) Künzli

Tehelné pole, Bratislava
Attendance: 4,000

15 July 1972
Round 4

Zürich (Switzerland)	1–1	(Austria) First Vienna
Künzli 45' (1:0)	FCZ summary	66' (1:1) Traxler; (yellow card) Hevera

Letzigrund, Zürich
Attendance: 3,500
Referee: (Switzerland) Jean Dubach (Nidau)

22 July 1972
Round 5

Zürich (Switzerland)	1–3	(Czechoslovakia) Slovan Bratislava
Künzli 25' (1:0)	FCZ summary	42' (1:1) Pekárik; 45' (1:2) Pekárik; 87' (1:3) Čapkovič

Letzigrund, Zürich
Attendance: 4,100
Referee: (Switzerland) Hans Wieland (Grenchen)

29 July 1972
Round 6

Djurgården (Sweden)	2–1	(Switzerland) Zürich
Svensson 16' (1:0); Svensson 71' (2:1)	FCZ summary	48' (1:1) Künzli

Stockholm
Attendance: 950
Referee: (Sweden) Sven Jonsson

=== Group 6 ===
Pos	Team	Pld	W	D	L	GF	GA	GD	Pts	EIN	ŽIL	LAN	VEJ
1	(West Germany) Eintracht Braunschweig	6	4	1	1	15	5	+10	9	—	5–0	2–0	4–1
2	(Czechoslovakia) Žilina	6	3	2	1	11	11	0	8	1–1	—	1–0	3–1
3	(Sweden) Landskrona	6	2	2	2	7	6	+1	6	3–0	2–2	—	0–0
4	(Denmark) Vejle	6	0	1	5	5	16	−11	1	0–3	2–4	1–2	—

Source: mogiel.net
Rules for classification: 1) Points; 2) Goal difference; 3) Goals scored; 4) Head-to-head points; 5) Away goals scored; 6) Draw.

=== Group 7 ===
Pos	Team	Pld	W	D	L	GF	GA	GD	Pts	HAN	GCZ	STA	HVI
1	(West Germany) Hannover	6	4	1	1	15	10	+5	9	—	3–2	4–1	3–2
2	(Switzerland) Grasshopper Club	6	2	3	1	12	7	+5	7	1–1	—	1–1	1–1
3	(Poland) Stal Mielec	6	3	1	2	13	12	+1	7	3–2	1–4	—	5–0
4	(Denmark) Hvidovre	6	0	1	5	5	16	−11	1	1–2	0–3	1–2	—

Source: mogiel.net
Rules for classification: 1) Points; 2) Goal difference; 3) Goals scored; 4) Head-to-head points; 5) Away goals scored; 6) Draw.

=== Group 8 ===
Pos	Team	Pld	W	D	L	GF	GA	GD	Pts	LNZ	ODR	OBE	FRE
1	(Austria) VÖEST Linz	6	2	3	1	10	8	+2	7	—	2–0	1–1	3–1
2	(Poland) Odra Opole	6	3	0	3	11	8	+3	6	2–0	—	4–3	4–0
3	(West Germany) Rot-Weiß Oberhausen	6	2	2	2	11	11	0	6	2–2	1–0	—	2–1
4	(Denmark) Frem	6	2	1	3	9	14	−5	5	2–2	2–1	3–2	—

Source: mogiel.net
Rules for classification: 1) Points; 2) Goal difference; 3) Goals scored; 4) Head-to-head points; 5) Away goals scored; 6) Draw.

== See also ==
- 1972–73 European Cup
- 1972–73 UEFA Cup Winners' Cup
- 1972–73 UEFA Cup
