= 1971–72 Belgian First Division =

69th season of top-tier football in Belgium

Belgian First Division
- Season: 1971–72

Statistics of Belgian First Division in the 1971–72 season.

== Overview ==
Location of teams in Belgian First Division 1971–72

It was contested by 16 teams, and R.S.C. Anderlecht won the championship.

== League standings ==
| Pos | Team | Pld | W | D | L | GF | GA | GD | Pts | Qualification or relegation |
|---|---|---|---|---|---|---|---|---|---|---|
| 1 | R.S.C. Anderlecht | 30 | 19 | 7 | 4 | 67 | 25 | +42 | 45 | Qualified for 1972–73 European Cup |
| 2 | Club Brugge K.V. | 30 | 18 | 9 | 3 | 57 | 22 | +35 | 45 | Qualified for 1972–73 UEFA Cup |
| 3 | Standard Liège | 30 | 15 | 11 | 4 | 48 | 19 | +29 | 41 | Qualified for 1972–73 European Cup Winners' Cup |
| 4 | Racing White | 30 | 13 | 10 | 7 | 42 | 28 | +14 | 36 | Qualified for 1972–73 UEFA Cup |
| 5 | Cercle Brugge K.S.V. | 30 | 12 | 8 | 10 | 30 | 24 | +6 | 32 | |
| 6 | KV Mechelen | 30 | 10 | 11 | 9 | 35 | 31 | +4 | 31 | |
| 7 | Lierse S.K. | 30 | 11 | 8 | 11 | 36 | 42 | −6 | 30 | |
| 8 | R.F.C. de Liège | 30 | 12 | 4 | 14 | 41 | 47 | −6 | 28 | |
| 9 | Royale Union Saint-Gilloise | 30 | 10 | 8 | 12 | 26 | 40 | −14 | 28 | |
| 10 | Beerschot | 30 | 11 | 5 | 14 | 33 | 39 | −6 | 27 | |
| 11 | K. Sint-Truidense V.V. | 30 | 9 | 8 | 13 | 31 | 42 | −11 | 26 | |
| 12 | Royal Antwerp FC | 30 | 8 | 9 | 13 | 32 | 33 | −1 | 25 | |
| 13 | KFC Diest | 30 | 8 | 9 | 13 | 27 | 50 | −23 | 25 | |
| 14 | Crossing Club Schaerbeek | 30 | 6 | 12 | 12 | 17 | 35 | −18 | 24 | |
| 15 | K.S.V. Waregem | 30 | 7 | 7 | 16 | 30 | 44 | −14 | 21 | Relegated to Division II |
| 16 | K.S.K. Beveren | 30 | 5 | 6 | 19 | 21 | 52 | −31 | 16 | Relegated to Division II |

== Results ==
| Home \ Away | AND | ANT | BEE | BEV | CER | CLU | CRO | DIE | FCL | LIE | MEC | RRW | STA | STV | USG | WAR |
|---|---|---|---|---|---|---|---|---|---|---|---|---|---|---|---|---|
| Anderlecht | | 3–2 | 2–1 | 3–1 | 1–0 | 1–1 | 5–0 | 8–1 | 4–0 | 4–0 | 1–1 | 1–1 | 1–1 | 5–1 | 6–0 | 2–1 |
| Antwerp | 1–0 | | 1–0 | 1–0 | 1–1 | 1–3 | 0–1 | 1–1 | 0–0 | 1–2 | 2–0 | 1–2 | 0–0 | 4–1 | 0–0 | 1–0 |
| Beerschot | 1–1 | 1–0 | | 3–1 | 1–0 | 1–3 | 0–0 | 5–1 | 0–2 | 2–0 | 3–1 | 0–0 | 1–3 | 3–1 | 2–1 | 2–0 |
| Beveren | 1–2 | 1–0 | 0–1 | | 1–0 | 0–4 | 1–1 | 0–0 | 2–0 | 2–4 | 0–1 | 2–2 | 0–2 | 0–0 | 0–1 | 1–3 |
| Cercle Brugge | 2–0 | 1–4 | 3–1 | 1–0 | | 1–0 | 3–0 | 2–0 | 3–1 | 1–2 | 1–0 | 2–2 | 0–0 | 0–1 | 0–0 | 0–0 |
| Club Brugge | 0–2 | 1–1 | 2–0 | 6–1 | 1–1 | | 1–0 | 5–0 | 3–1 | 3–0 | 1–0 | 2–0 | 0–0 | 3–1 | 3–2 | 3–1 |
| Crossing Schaerbeek | 0–2 | 1–0 | 0–0 | 2–1 | 1–0 | 0–1 | | 1–1 | 0–0 | 2–2 | 0–0 | 1–3 | 0–2 | 0–1 | 0–1 | 1–1 |
| Diest | 0–1 | 2–1 | 1–0 | 2–3 | 0–1 | 1–2 | 1–1 | | 2–1 | 0–0 | 1–0 | 1–1 | 1–0 | 1–0 | 0–3 | 3–1 |
| Liège | 1–0 | 4–2 | 1–0 | 3–0 | 2–2 | 1–1 | 1–0 | 2–1 | | 0–2 | 6–1 | 1–0 | 1–2 | 1–0 | 5–0 | 4–0 |
| Lierse | 0–0 | 0–3 | 2–0 | 1–2 | 0–1 | 1–1 | 0–0 | 0–0 | 3–1 | | 2–1 | 1–0 | 1–0 | 2–2 | 3–1 | 3–2 |
| Mechelen | 2–3 | 2–2 | 4–0 | 1–0 | 1–0 | 1–2 | 1–1 | 1–1 | 4–0 | 2–2 | | 1–0 | 0–0 | 1–1 | 2–0 | 2–0 |
| Racing White | 1–1 | 1–0 | 4–1 | 3–0 | 0–1 | 1–1 | 0–0 | 0–2 | 5–0 | 1–0 | 0–0 | | 2–1 | 1–1 | 4–1 | 1–0 |
| Standard Liège | 4–0 | 1–1 | 0–0 | 3–1 | 1–0 | 0–0 | 4–0 | 3–1 | 4–0 | 2–0 | 2–2 | 2–3 | | 3–0 | 2–1 | 2–0 |
| Sint-Truiden | 1–2 | 1–1 | 2–1 | 0–0 | 1–0 | 1–1 | 2–0 | 4–1 | 1–0 | 3–2 | 0–2 | 0–1 | 2–3 | | 0–1 | 3–1 |
| Union SG | 0–2 | 1–0 | 1–0 | 0–0 | 1–1 | 1–3 | 0–2 | 1–1 | 2–1 | 2–0 | 0–1 | 3–1 | 1–1 | 1–0 | | 0–0 |
| Waregem | 0–4 | 2–0 | 2–3 | 2–0 | 1–2 | 1–0 | 1–2 | 2–0 | 3–0 | 3–1 | 0–0 | 1–2 | 1–1 | 1–1 | 0–0 | |

Legend: Blue = home team win; Yellow = draw; Red = away team win.
