= 1973 Soviet Cup =

1973 Cup of USSR in Football
Кубок СССР

Tournament details
- Country: Soviet Union
- Dates: March 4 – October 10
- Teams: 36

Final positions
- Champions: Ararat Yerevan
- Runners-up: Dinamo Kiev

The 1973 Soviet Cup was an association football cup competition of the Soviet Union. The winner of the competition, Ararat Yerevan qualified for the continental tournament.

== Participating teams ==
Enter in First round		Enter in Qualification round
Vysshaya Liga 16/16 teams	Pervaya Liga 12/20 teams	Pervaya Liga 8/20 teams
✓ Ararat Yerevan; ✓ Dinamo Kiev; ✓ Dinamo Moscow; ✓ Spartak Moscow; ✓ Dinamo Tbilisi; ✓ Shakhter Donetsk; ✓ Zaria Voroshilovgrad; ✓ Dnepr Dnepropetrovsk; ✓ Kairat Alma-Ata; ✓ CSKA Moscow; ✓ Zenit Leningrad; ✓ Pakhtakor Tashkent; ✓ Torpedo Moscow; ✓ Karpaty Lvov; ✓ Dinamo Minsk; ✓ SKA Rostov-na-Donu	✓ Chernomorets Odessa; ✓ Nistru Kishinev; ✓ Lokomotiv Moscow; ✓ Neftchi Baku; ✓ Shinnik Yaroslavl; ✓ Krylya Sovetov Kuibyshev; ✓ Torpedo Kutaisi; ✓ Zvezda Perm; ✓ Pamir Dushanbe; ✓ Spartak Ordzhonikidze; ✓ Shakhter Karaganda; ✓ Alga Frunze	✓ Tekstilschik Ivanovo; ✓ Metallurg Zaporozhye; ✓ Avtomobilist Nalchik; ✓ Metallist Kharkov; ✓ Stroitel Ashkhabad; ✓ Kuzbass Kemerovo; ✓ Metallurg Lipetsk; ✓ Spartak Ivano-Frankovsk

Source: []

== Competition schedule ==
=== Preliminary round ===
[Mar 4, 10] 
Kuzbass Kemerovo           0-0  1-2  METALLIST Kharkov 
Metallurg Lipetsk          1-1  0-2  SPARTAK Nalchik 
METALLURG Zaporozhye       3-0  1-0  Stroitel Ashkhabad 
TEXTILSHCHIK Ivanovo       3-2  1-0  Spartak Ivano-Frankovsk

=== First round ===
[Mar 14, Apr 1] 
SPARTAK Moskva             0-0  2-1  Nistru Kishinev 
  [1. Att: 2,000 (in Sochi)] 
  [2. Alexandr Piskaryov 17, 39 - Valeriy Zhuravlyov 80. Att: 18,000] 
[Mar 15, Apr 1] 
DINAMO Minsk               1-0  0-0  Zvezda Perm 
  [1. Anatoliy Vasilyev 43. Att: 3,000 (in Pyatigorsk)] 
  [2. Att: 2,000 (in Sochi)] 
DINAMO Tbilisi             2-0  0-0  Krylya Sovetov Kuibyshev 
  [1. Givi Nodia 30, Kakhi Asatiani 85 pen. Att: 25,000] 
  [2. Att: 16,000 (in Stavropol)] 
DNEPR Dnepropetrovsk       1-1  1-0  Lokomotiv Moskva 
  [1. Yuriy Solovyov 65 – Anatoliy Piskunov 40. Att: 20,000] 
  [2. Alexei Khristyan 76. Att: 2,000 (in Hosta)] 
Metallist Kharkov          0-3  0-3  DINAMO Kiev 
  [1. Viktor Kolotov 60, Oleg Blokhin 67, Anatoliy Puzach 71. Att: 10,000 (in Sevastopol)] 
  [2. Anatoliy Puzach 4, Vladimir Muntyan 77, Oleg Blokhin 84. Att: 20,000] 
Shinnik Yaroslavl          0-0  0-2  DINAMO Moskva              [aet] 
  [1. Att: 1,000 (in Adler)] 
  [2. Gennadiy Yevryuzhikhin 91 pen, Anatoliy Kozhemyakin 108. Att: 10,000 (in Samarkand)] 
Textilshchik Ivanovo       0-0  0-1  PAHTAKOR Tashkent 
  [1. (in Sochi)] 
  [2. Vassilis Hatzipanagis 85] 
Torpedo Moskva             1-1  0-0  SHAKHTYOR Karaganda 
  [1. Yuriy Smirnov 35 – Anatoliy Novikov 50. Att: 3,000 (in Sochi)] 
  [2. Att: 10,000 (in Leninabad)] 
[Mar 16, Apr 1] 
ARARAT Yerevan             1-0  1-0  Alga Frunze 
CHERNOMORETS Odessa        2-0  2-2  SKA Rostov-na-Donu 
  [1. Grigoriy Sapozhnikov 74, Vladimir Nechayev 85 pen. Att: 25,000] 
  [2. Leonid Baranovskiy 70, Anatoliy Shepel 71 – Alexei Yeskov 45 pen, 89. Att: 30,000] 
Karpaty Lvov               1-1  0-0  NEFTCHI Baku 
  [1. Lev Brovarskiy 7 - ?] 
Pamir Dushanbe             0-2  1-1  KAYRAT Alma-Ata 
  [1. Vladimir Chebotaryov 7, Yevgeniy Piunovskiy 44] 
  [2. Shuhrat Azamov ? – Yevgeniy Piunovskiy 13] 
Torpedo Kutaisi            0-3  1-2  CSKA Moskva 
  [1. Vladimir Fedotov 24, 41, Boris Kopeikin 80]
  [2. Merab Chakhunashvili 4 – Vladimir Dorofeyev 75, 79 (in Simferopol)] 
ZENIT Leningrad            1-1  2-0  Spartak Nalchik 
  [1. Georgiy Khromchenkov 61 – Nugzar Chitauri 86. Att: 3,000 (in Sochi)] 
  [2. Yuriy Zagumennykh 50, Georgiy Vyun 81. Att: 18,000] 
[Mar 17, Apr 1] 
ZARYA Voroshilovgrad       2-1  1-0  Spartak Orjonikidze 
  [1. Yuriy Vasenin 5, Alexandr Zhuravlyov 56 - Nodar Papelishvili 8. Att: 300 (in Sochi)] 
  [2. Vladimir Belousov 20. Att: 10,000] 
[Mar 31, Apr 3] 
SHAKHTYOR Donetsk          2-0  2-3  Metallurg Zaporozhye 
  [1. Vitaliy Starukhin 3, 26] 
  [2. Vitaliy Starukhin, Alexandr Vasin - ?]

=== Second round ===
[May 31, Jun 22] 
Shakhtyor Karaganda        0-2  1-3  CHERNOMORETS Odessa 
  [1. Anatoliy Shepel 25, Viktor Tomashevskiy 33] 
  [2. Nikolai Bushuyev 81 - Vladimir Nechayev 37 pen, Valeriy Kuzmin 77, Vitaliy Feidman 79] 
[Jun 5, 27] 
Dinamo Minsk               2-0  0-3  DNEPR Dnepropetrovsk  [aet] 
  [1. Nikolai Litvinov 13, Vladimir Sakharov 36. Att: 15,000] 
  [2. Viktor Romanyuk 17 pen, Valeriy Porkuyan 73, Yuriy Solovyov 119. Att: 20,000] 
Kayrat Alma-Ata            1-1  1-2  DINAMO Kiev 
  [1. Vladislav Markin 73 – Anatoliy Puzach 8. Att: 10,000] 
  [2. Valeriy Yerkovich 69 – Vladimir Muntyan 21 pen, Viktor Kolotov 63] 
Neftchi Baku               0-1  1-3  ARARAT Yerevan 
SPARTAK Moskva             2-1  1-1  Dinamo Tbilisi 
  [1. Yevgeniy Lovchev 11, Alexandr Piskaryov 67 – Zurab Tsereteli 87. Att: 15,000] 
  [2. Nikolai Kiselyov 72 – Vissarion Mchedlishvili 16. Att: 21,000] 
ZARYA Voroshilovgrad       2-0  0-1  Shakhtyor Donetsk 
  [1. Vladimir Onishchenko 7, Viktor Kuznetsov 23. Att: 25,000] 
  [2. Yuriy Gubich 12. Att: 20,000] 
Zenit Leningrad            1-1  1-1  DINAMO Moskva         [pen 3-5] 
  [1. Anatoliy Zinchenko 57 – Vladimir Kozlov 27. Att: 20,000] 
  [2. Pavel Sadyrin 13 – Mikhail Gershkovich 3. Att: 25,000] 
[Jun 6, 27] 
CSKA Moskva                3-1  1-1  Pahtakor Tashkent 
  [1. Vladimir Dorofeyev 30, Wilhelm Tellinger 58 pen, Vladimir Fedotov 87 – Berador Abduraimov 71] 
  [2. Vladimir Dorofeyev 22 – Yuriy Belov 55]

=== Quarterfinals ===
[Jul 11, 25] 
ARARAT Yerevan             2-0  0-1  Zarya Voroshilovgrad 
  [1. Levon Ishtoyan ?, Eduard Markarov 33. Att: 41,300] 
  [2. Nikolai Pinchuk 87. Att: 25,000] 
CSKA Moskva                0-2  0-3  DINAMO Kiev 
  [1. Viktor Kolotov 67, Vladimir Veremeyev 88. Att: 25,000] 
  [2. Vyacheslav Semyonov 7, Viktor Kolotov 44, Oleg Blokhin 49. Att: 30,000] 
DNEPR Dnepropetrovsk       0-0  2-1  Spartak Moskva 
  [1. Att: 25,000] 
  [2. Anatoliy Grinko 48, Valeriy Porkuyan 74 - Alexandr Kokorev 80. Att: 23,000] 
[Jul 12, 25] 
DINAMO Moskva              3-0  3-2  Chernomorets Odessa 
  [1. Yuriy Pudyshev 19, 62, Vladimir Kozlov 61. Att: 31,000] 
  [2. Anatoliy Kozhemyakin 9, 30, 85 – Anatoliy Shepel 39 pen, Igor Ivanenko 55. Att: 15,000]

=== Semifinals ===
[Aug 1, 15] 
Dnepr Dnepropetrovsk       0-1  0-1  ARARAT Yerevan 
  [1. Eduard Markarov] 
  [2. Eduard Markarov] 
[Aug 16, Sep 12] 
DINAMO Kiev                1-1  1-1  Dinamo Moskva         [pen 6-5] 
  [1. Viktor Kolotov 66 pen – Gennadiy Yevryuzhikhin 14. Att: 40,000] 
  [2. Oleg Blokhin 3 – Vladimir Kozlov 39. Att: 35,000]

==== Final ====
10 October 1973

Ararat Yerevan	2 – 1 (a.e.t.)	Dinamo Kiev
Ishtoyan 89', 103'	Report	Kolotov 61' (pen.)

Lenin's Central Stadium, Moscow
Attendance: 60,000
Referee: Pavel Kazakov (Moscow)
