= 1971 Danish 1st Division =

26th season of Danish 1st Division

Danish 1st Division
- Season: 1971

Statistics of Danish 1st Division in the 1971 season.

== Overview ==
It was contested by 12 teams, and Vejle Boldklub won the championship.

== League standings ==
Pos	Team	Pld	W	D	L	GF	GA	GD	Pts	Qualification or relegation
1	Vejle Boldklub	22	13	3	6	61	40	+21	29	1972–73 European Cup
2	Hvidovre IF	22	10	4	8	44	38	+6	24	1972–73 UEFA Cup
3	Boldklubben Frem	22	10	4	8	40	36	+4	24	1972–73 UEFA Cup
4	Kjøbenhavns Boldklub	22	10	4	8	49	47	+2	24	
5	Randers Sportsklub Freja	22	9	5	8	40	42	−2	23	
6	Køge BK	22	9	5	8	44	47	−3	23	
7	Brønshøj BK	22	10	2	10	43	52	−9	22	
8	Boldklubben 1903	22	7	7	8	35	31	+4	21	
9	B 1901	22	8	4	10	46	47	−1	20	
10	Boldklubben 1909	22	6	7	9	39	40	−1	19	
11	Aalborg Boldspilklub	22	7	4	11	37	47	−10	18	Relegation to 1972 Second Division
12	Akademisk Boldklub	22	7	3	12	34	45	−11	17	Relegation to 1972 Second Division

Source: "Danmarksturneringen 1971, slutstillingen". danskfodbold.com.

== Results ==
Home \ Away	ABK	AaB	B01	B03	B09	BBK	BKF	HIF	KB	KBK	RSF	VBK
Akademisk BK	—	1–2	1–0	2–2	3–1	0–1	2–0	3–2	1–2	2–2	2–1	0–3
Aalborg BK	4–2	—	2–2	0–0	0–3	1–3	3–0	3–1	1–4	0–1	2–1	2–3
B 1901	3–2	1–3	—	3–4	3–0	1–2	3–4	3–2	0–1	2–3	2–0	1–1
B 1903	1–2	2–2	4–1	—	2–0	1–1	1–2	1–1	2–3	3–4	1–1	2–1
B 1909	2–2	4–0	2–2	1–0	—	2–5	1–3	1–1	4–1	1–2	2–2	0–2
Brønshøj BK	2–1	4–2	4–1	0–1	1–5	—	2–4	3–2	1–2	4–2	2–0	0–5
BK Frem	2–1	3–1	2–3	0–0	1–1	1–0	—	1–2	2–2	1–1	5–1	1–0
Hvidovre IF	2–1	4–1	2–3	1–0	1–1	4–0	1–0	—	3–1	2–1	2–3	3–2
Kjøbenhavns BK		0–3	1–3	1–0	1–4	5–0	2–1	3–3	—	3–2	2–4	4–5
Køge BK	1–3	2–2	0–5	0–2	4–2	3–3	4–2	4–2	1–1	—	2–0	2–4
Randers Freja	4–1	2–1	2–2	2–4	3–1	3–2	3–1	1–0	3–3	2–1	—	0–2
Vejle BK	3–2	4–2	5–2	3–2	1–1	6–3	2–4	2–3	4–2	1–2	2–2	—

Legend: Blue = home team win; Yellow = draw; Red = away team win.
