= Nikolay Kazaryan =

Armenian footballer

Personal information
- Full name: Nikolay Andreevich Kazaryan
- Date of birth: 11 January 1947 (age 79)
- Place of birth: Baku, Azerbaijan
- Date of death: 19 December 2023 (aged 76)
- Place of death: Yerevan, Armenia
- Height: 1.75 m (5 ft 9 in)
- Position: Forward

Senior career*
Years	Team	Apps	(Gls)
1965–1976	Ararat	298	(67)

International career
	USSR Olympic	1	(0)

Managerial career
- Ethiopia (consultant)
- 1989: Ararat
- 1999: Kilikia
- 2008–2010: Lernayin Artsakh
- * Club domestic league appearances and goals

Nikolay Andreevich Kazaryan (Armenian: Նիկոլայ Ղազարյան Russian: Николай Казарян; Nikolai in some sources; 11 January 1947 - 19 December 2023) was an Armenian football manager and footballer.

== Life and career ==
Kazaryan was born on 11 January 1947 in Baku, Azerbaijan. He was born to a Lithuanian mother and an Armenian father. He moved with his family to Armenia at the age of ten. He mainly operated as a forward and was known for his speed. He started his career with Ararat, making 298 league appearances, scoring 67 goals while playing for the club. He helped them win the league. He also helped them win the 1973 Soviet Cup and the 1975 Soviet Cup. He played in the UEFA Cup while playing for them. He was a Soviet Union youth international and played for the Soviet Union Olympic football team. He made one appearance while playing for the team.

Kazaryan attended the Higher School of Coaches in Russia. After that, he worked as a consultant for the Ethiopia national football team. In 1989, he was appointed manager of Armenian side Ararat. In 1999, he was appointed manager of Armenian side Kilikia. In 2008, he was appointed manager of Armenian side Lernayin Artsakh. He was married. He had a daughter and a son. He died on 19 December 2023 in Yerevan, Armenia.
