= Paul Crampton =

English footballer

Personal information
- Full name: Paul Crampton
- Date of birth: 28 January 1953 (age 73)
- Place of birth: Cleethorpes, England
- Position: Full-back

Senior career*
Years	Team	Apps	(Gls)
1968–1971	Grimsby Town	1	(0)
- * Club domestic league appearances and goals

Paul Crampton (born 28 January 1953) is an English former footballer who played as a full-back.
