= Ray Fulton =

English footballer

Personal information
- Full name: Raymond Hamilton Fulton
- Date of birth: 24 September 1953 (age 73)
- Place of birth: Hendon, England
- Position: Left back

Youth career
- West Ham United

Senior career*
Years	Team	Apps	(Gls)
1972–1973	Orient	1	(0)
1973–1975	Wealdstone		
- Folkestone
- * Club domestic league appearances and goals

Raymond Hamilton Fulton (born 24 September 1953) is an English former professional footballer who played in the Football League as a left back.
