= Frank Richter (footballer) =

German footballer

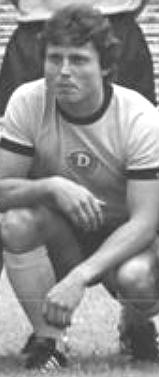
- Richter with Dynamo Dresden in 1980

Personal information
- Date of birth: January 5, 1952
- Place of birth: Kamenz, East Germany
- Date of death: November 13, 2025 (aged 73)
- Position: Forward

Youth career
- –1968: Einheit Kamenz
- 1968–1969: Dynamo Dresden

Senior career*
Years	Team	Apps	(Gls)
1969–1981	Dynamo Dresden	127	(20)
1981–1982	Stahl Riesa	6	(0)
Total		133	(20)

International career
1971–1973	East Germany	7	(1)

Managerial career
- Meißner SV 08
- * Club domestic league appearances and goals

Frank Richter (January 5, 1952 – November 13, 2025) was a German former footballer.

== Club career ==
The forward played more than 130 East German top-flight matches.

== International career ==
Richter's seven full international were mostly played against Latin American opposition.
