= Dojčin Perazić =

Montenegrin footballer (1945–2022)

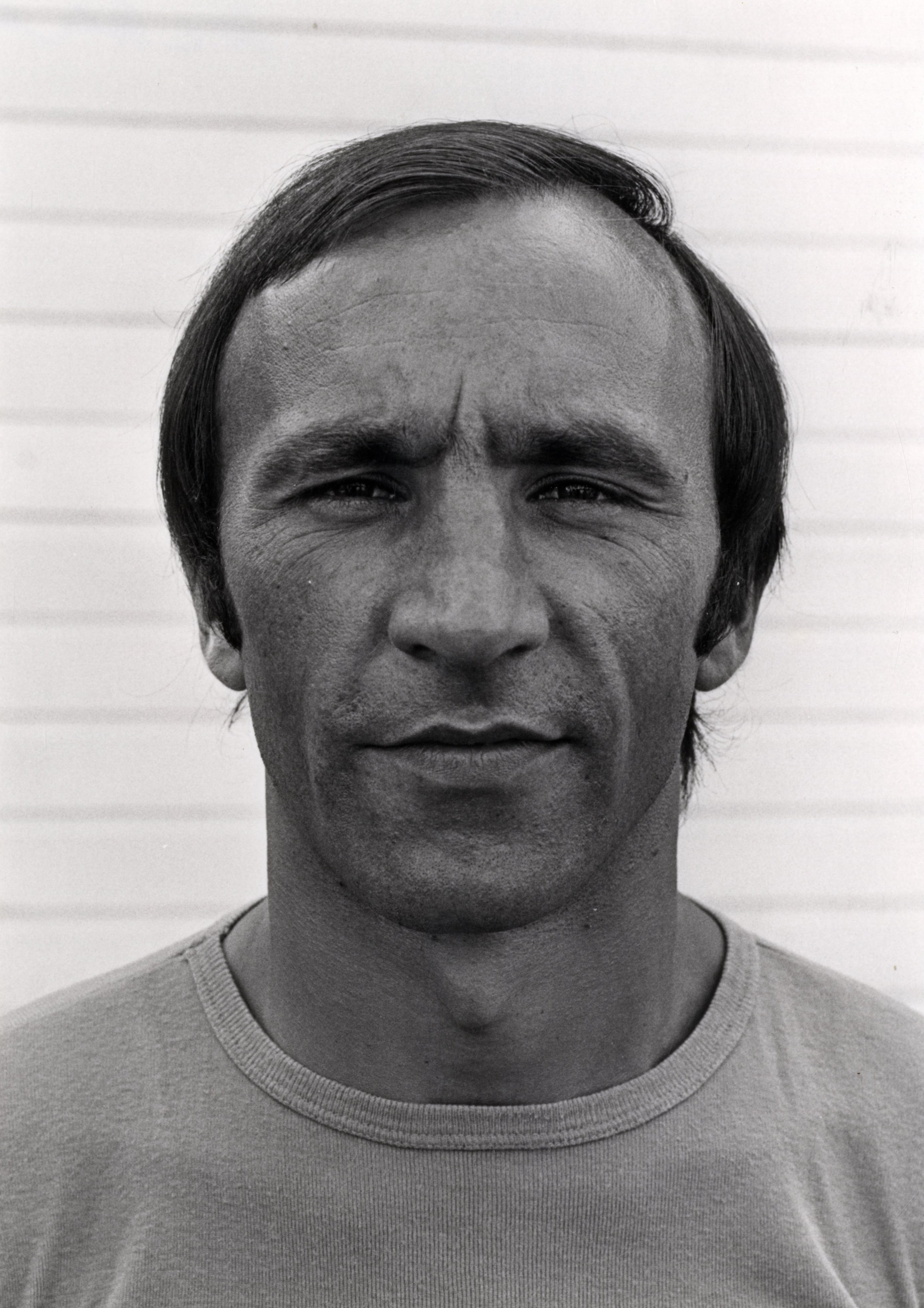
- Perazić in 1977

Personal information
- Date of birth: 17 December 1945
- Place of birth: Cetinje, SR Montenegro, FPR Yugoslavia
- Date of death: 25 January 2022 (aged 76)
- Place of death: Cetinje, Montenegro
- Position: Midfielder

Senior career*
Years	Team	Apps	(Gls)
1965–1968	Lovćen		
1968–1970	Red Star		
1970–1971	Maribor		
1971–1974	Vojvodina		
1974–1978	Den Haag	116	(8)

Managerial career
- 2003–2004: Royal Antwerp
- * Club domestic league appearances and goals

Dojčin Perazić (17 December 1945 – 25 January 2022) was a Montenegrin footballer who played as a midfielder. He died in Cetinje on 25 January 2022, at the age of 76.
