= Pavel Kazakov =

Soviet football referee (1928–2012)

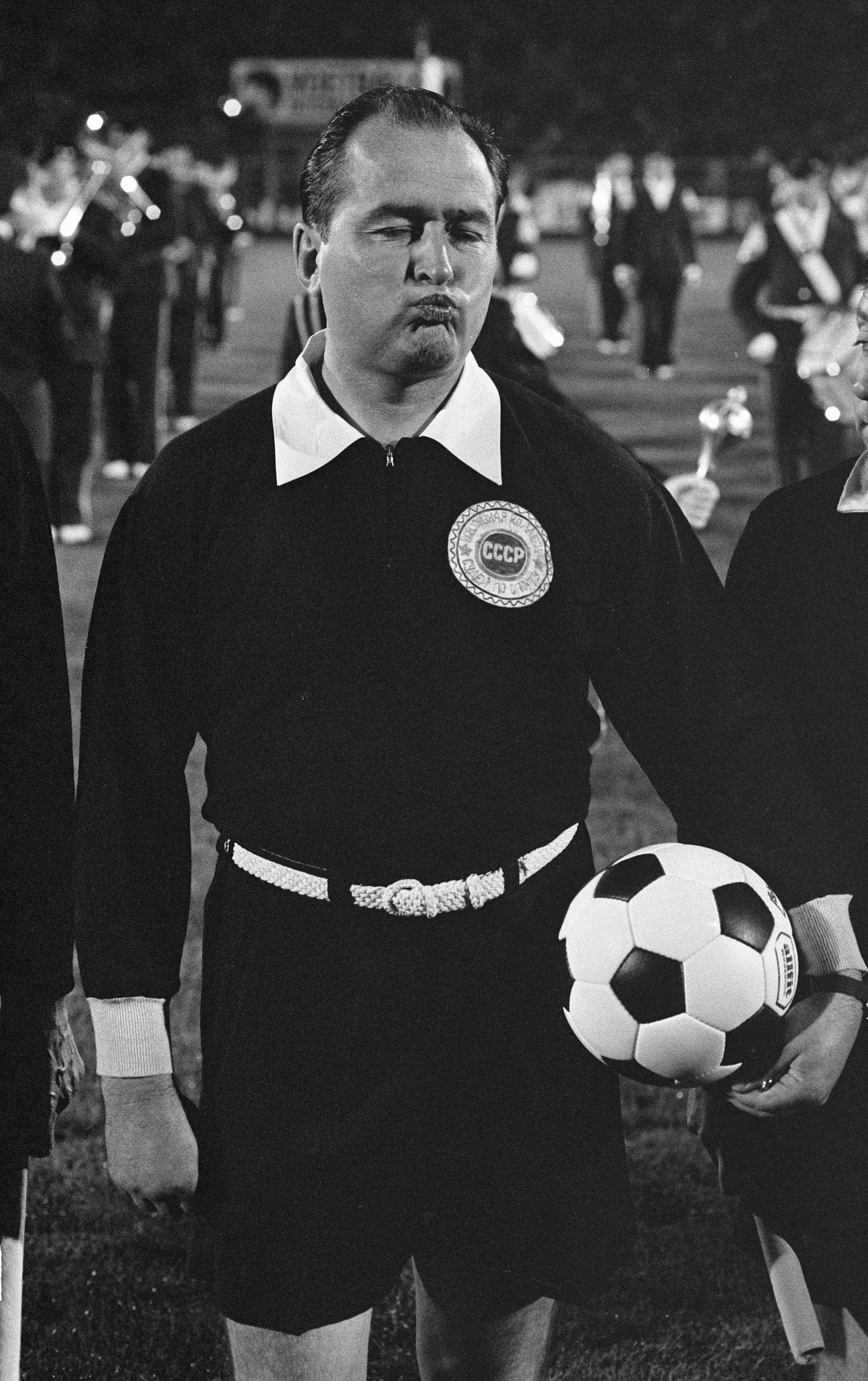
- Kazakov officiating in 1969
- Born: 19 February 1928; Moscow, USSR
- Died: 17 September 2012 (aged 84); Moscow, Russia
- Other occupation: Academic

Domestic
| Years | League | Role |
| 1950s–1976 | Soviet Top League | Referee |
| 1969–1974 | UEFA Cup Winners' Cup | Referee |
| 1971–1976 | UEFA Cup | Referee |
| 1970–1976 | European Cup | Referee |

International
| Years | League | Role |
| 1970–75 | UEFA European Championship qualifying | Referee |
| 1972 | Summer Olympic Games | Referee |
| 1972–73 | FIFA World Cup qualification | Referee |
| 1974 | FIFA World Cup | Referee |

Pavel Nikolaevich Kazakov (Russian: Па́вел Никола́евич Казако́в, 19 February 1928–17 September 2012) was a Soviet football referee, who was the country's referee of the year on 15 occasions. He officiated the second leg of the 1973 UEFA Cup Final, as well as at the 1972 Summer Olympics and 1974 FIFA World Cup.

== Career ==
Kazakov officiated over 100 matches in the Soviet Top League. In 1959, he was awarded the Master of Sports of the USSR. He was awarded USSR referee of the year on 15 occasions (from 1961–1965, and 1967–1976 inclusive), which was a record for a Soviet or Russian official. He officiated the 1973 Soviet Cup Final between Ararat Yerevan and Dynamo Kyiv, and the 1976 Soviet Cup Final between Ararat Yerevan and Dinamo Tbilisi.

Between 1969 and 1976, Kazakov officiated 12 matches in the European Cup, UEFA Cup and UEFA Cup Winners' Cup. He officiated the second leg of the 1973 UEFA Cup Final between Liverpool and Borussia Mönchengladbach. Kazakov officiated at the 1972 Summer Olympics. He was the main referee for the match between Denmark and Brazil, and was an assistant referee in four other fixtures at the Games. He officiated two matches at the 1974 FIFA World Cup: the group stage match between Argentina and Italy, and the group stage match between West Germany and Sweden. In an interview, Kazakov said that he was considered as a referee for the 1974 FIFA World Cup Final, but overlooked due to the controversy of Soviet linesman Tofiq Bahramov at the 1966 FIFA World Cup Final.

In 1976, Kazakov announced his retirement from officiating.

== Personal life, death and legacy ==
Aside from his officiating career, Kazakov worked at the Moscow Institute of Physical Education from 1954 to 1980. Kazakov died on 17 September 2012 in Moscow; his death was announced by the Russian Football Union. In 2015, a monument to Kazakov was unveiled in Vagankovsky, Moscow.
