= Stuart Senior =

English footballer

Personal information
- Date of birth: 26 October 1953 (age 73)
- Place of birth: Barnsley, England
- Position: Winger

Senior career*
Years	Team	Apps	(Gls)
	Barnsley	2	(0)
- Kiveton Park
- * Club domestic league appearances and goals

Stuart Senior (born 26 October 1953) in Barnsley is an English former footballer who played for Barnsley.
