= Lothar Huber =

German footballer and coach

Personal information
- Date of birth: 5 May 1952 (age 74)
- Place of birth: Kaiserslautern, West Germany
- Position: Defender

Senior career*
Years	Team	Apps	(Gls)
1970–1974	1. FC Kaiserslautern	63	(2)
1974–1987	Borussia Dortmund	329	(46)

Managerial career
- 2003–2004: Borussia Dortmund (assistant)
- 2004–2007: TSG Sprockhövel
- 2007–2008: SpVgg Radevormwald
- 2008–2014: TSG Sprockhövel
- * Club domestic league appearances and goals

Lothar Huber (born 5 May 1952 in Kaiserslautern) is a German football coach and a former player.

== Career ==
As a player, he spent 17 seasons in the Bundesliga: 4 with 1. FC Kaiserslautern and 13 with Borussia Dortmund.

== Coaching career ==
After his assistant coaching job with Borussia Dortmund, he was named as the new manager of TSG Sprockhövel where he discovered the talent Lukas Schmitz. After three years with TSG Sprockhövel, Huber resigned and began to work as manager of SpVgg Radevormwald, before he returned to his former club TSG Sprockhövel in August 2008.

== Honours ==
- DFB-Pokal finalist: 1971–72
