= Attila Ladinszky =

Hungarian footballer (1949–2020)

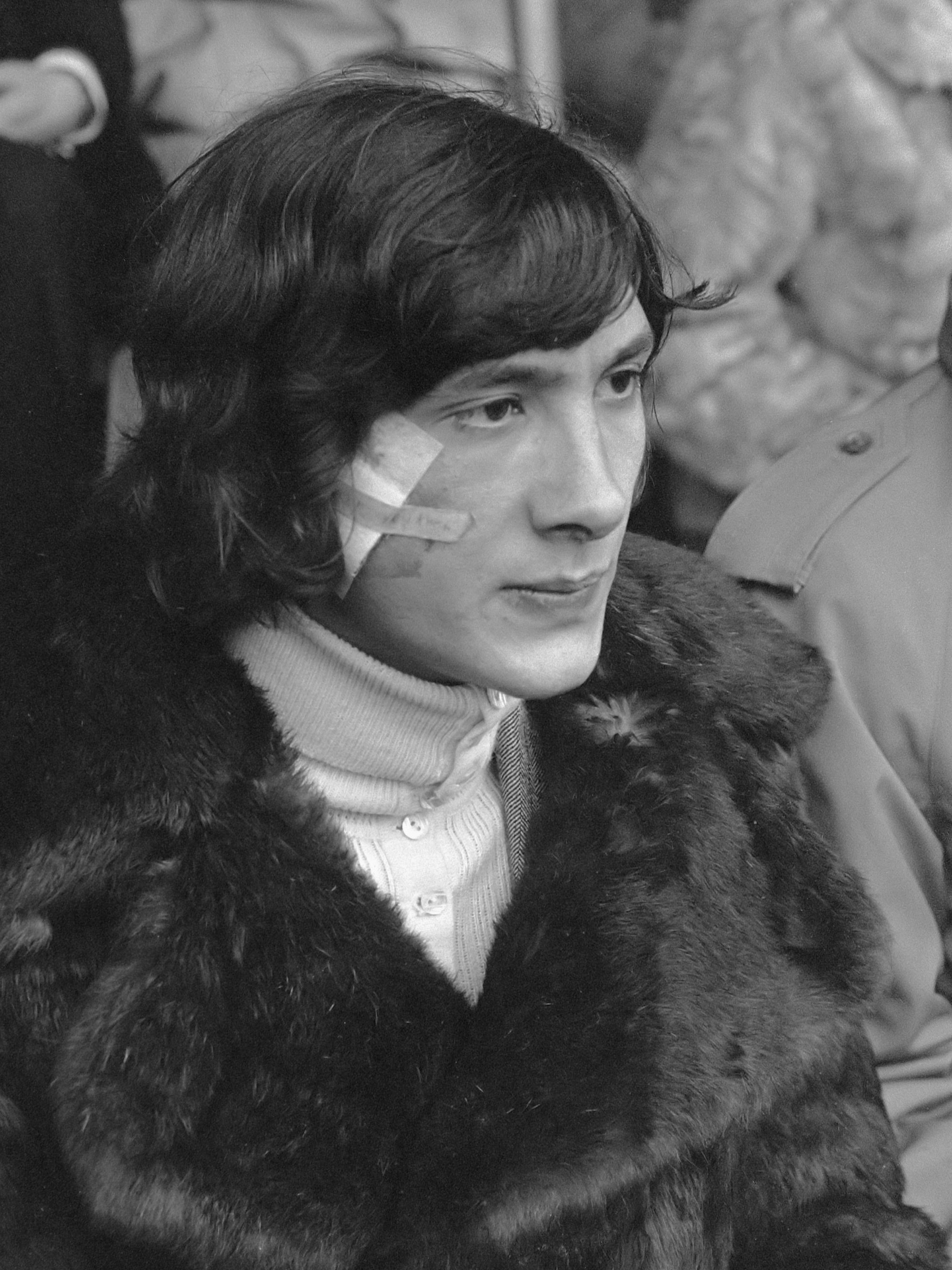
- Attila Ladinszky in 1971

Personal information
- Full name: Attila János Ladinszky
- Date of birth: 13 September 1949
- Place of birth: Budapest, Hungary
- Date of death: 14 May 2020 (aged 70)
- Place of death: Budapest, Hungary
- Height: 1.82 m (5 ft 11 1/2 in)
- Position: Striker

Senior career*
Years	Team	Apps	(Gls)
1968–1970	Tatabánya	59	(8)
1970–1971	Vasas Budapest	17	(0)
1971	Rot-Weiss Essen	0	(0)
1971–1973	Feyenoord	25	(9)
1973–1975	Anderlecht	52	(27)
1975–1978	Real Betis	59	(17)
1978–1979	Kortrijk	21	(2)
1979–1980	Valenciennes	27	(6)
1980–1981	Toulouse	11	(2)
1981–1983	Amarante		
- * Club domestic league appearances and goals

Attila Ladinszky nicknamed Le Gitan (The Gypsy) (13 September 1949 – 14 May 2020) was a Hungarian football striker, born in Budapest.

He was top scorer of the Belgian League in 1973/74. Following his career, he worked as a scout and ran his own Hungarian restaurant in Brussels, where he lived until the mid 1990s, before returning to Hungary.

Ladinszky died in Budapest in May 2020, aged 70.

== Honours ==
Anderlecht

- Belgian First Division: 1973–74
- Belgian Cup: 1974–75
- Belgian League Cup: 1973, 1974

Individual

- Belgian First Division top scorer: 1973–74 (22 goals)
