= Flemming Mortensen =

Danish footballer (born 1944)

Personal information
- Full name: Flemming Falkenberg Mortensen
- Date of birth: 7 July 1944 (age 82)
- Place of birth: Kalundborg, Denmark
- Position: Defender

Senior career*
Years	Team	Apps	(Gls)
1965–1968	Frem		
1971–1976	Frem		
1976–1977	Slagelse B&I		
1977–1978	Hellerup IK		
1978–1979	Holbæk B&I		

International career
1965–1966	Denmark U21	5	(0)
1968–1977	Denmark	16	(0)
- * Club domestic league appearances and goals

Flemming Falkenberg Mortensen (born 7 July 1944) is a Danish former footballer who played as a defender. He made 16 appearances for the Denmark national team from 1968 to 1977.
