= Ladislav Móder =

Slovak footballer

Personal information
- Full name: Ladislav Móder
- Date of birth: 2 December 1945
- Place of birth: Tvrdošovce, Czechoslovakia
- Date of death: 2 December 2006 (aged 61)
- Place of death: Slovakia

Senior career*
Years	Team	Apps	(Gls)
1968–1976	Slovan		
- * Club domestic league appearances and goals

Ladislav Móder (2 December 1945 – 2 December 2006) was a Slovak footballer. He was born in Tvrdošovce and spent most of his playing career with ŠK Slovan Bratislava, winning the Czechoslovak league in 1970 and the Czechoslovak Cup in 1968.
