= Roger Mostyn (footballer) =

Welsh footballer (1953)

Personal information
- Full name: Roger Mostyn
- Date of birth: 31 August 1953 (age 73)
- Place of birth: Wrexham, Wales
- Position: Forward

Senior career*
Years	Team	Apps	(Gls)
1971–1974	Wrexham	19	(4)
- Bath City
- * Club domestic league appearances and goals

Roger Mostyn (born 31 August 1953) is a Welsh former professional footballer who played as a forward. He made appearances in the English Football League for his hometown club Wrexham, and also played for Bath City.
