= Slobodan Janković (footballer, born 1946) =

Serbian footballer

Personal information
- Date of birth: 23 April 1946 (age 80)
- Place of birth: Belgrade, SFR Yugoslavia
- Position: Midfielder

Senior career*
| Years | Team | Apps | (Gls) |
| 1968–1969 | Red Star Belgrade | 3 | (0) |
| 1966–1968 | → Sloga Kraljevo (loan) | 30 | (19) |
| 1969–1970 | → Maribor (loan) | 34 | (11) |
| 1970–1975 | Red Star Belgrade | 75 | (14) |
| 1975–1977 | Lens | 42 | (12) |
| 1977–1978 | Osijek | 47 | (10) |
| 1978–1979 | Maribor | 20 | (0) |
| 1979–1980 | Buffalo Stallions (indoor) | 20 | (24) |
| 1983–1984 | Sinđelić Beograd | | |

International career
| 1975 | Yugoslavia | 1 | (0) |

Managerial career
- 1994-1995: Obilić
- * Club domestic league appearances and goals

Slobodan Janković (Serbian Cyrillic: Слободан Јанковић; born 23 April 1946) is a Serbian retired football midfielder who played for SFR Yugoslavia.

Janković made one appearance for Yugoslavia, in a November 1975 European Championship qualifier away against Northern Ireland.

== See also ==
- List of NK Maribor players
