= Harry Svensson =

Swedish footballer

Personal information
- Full name: Göran Harry Svensson
- Date of birth: 11 June 1945 (age 81)
- Position: Midfielder

Senior career*
Years	Team	Apps	(Gls)
1965–1971	IFK Göteborg	96	(17)
1971–1976	Djurgårdens IF	124	(44)
1977–1979	Västerås SK		

International career
1973	Sweden	2	(1)
1974	Sweden B	1	(0)
- * Club domestic league appearances and goals

Göran Harry Svensson (born 11 June 1945) is a Swedish former footballer (midfielder).

Harry Svensson debuted for IFK Göteborg in 1965. In 1971, Svensson joined Djurgårdens IF. He made 124 Allsvenskan appearances for Djurgårdens IF and scored 44 goals. Later, Svensson joined Västerås SK.
