= Francis Rion =

Belgian football referee (1933–2022)

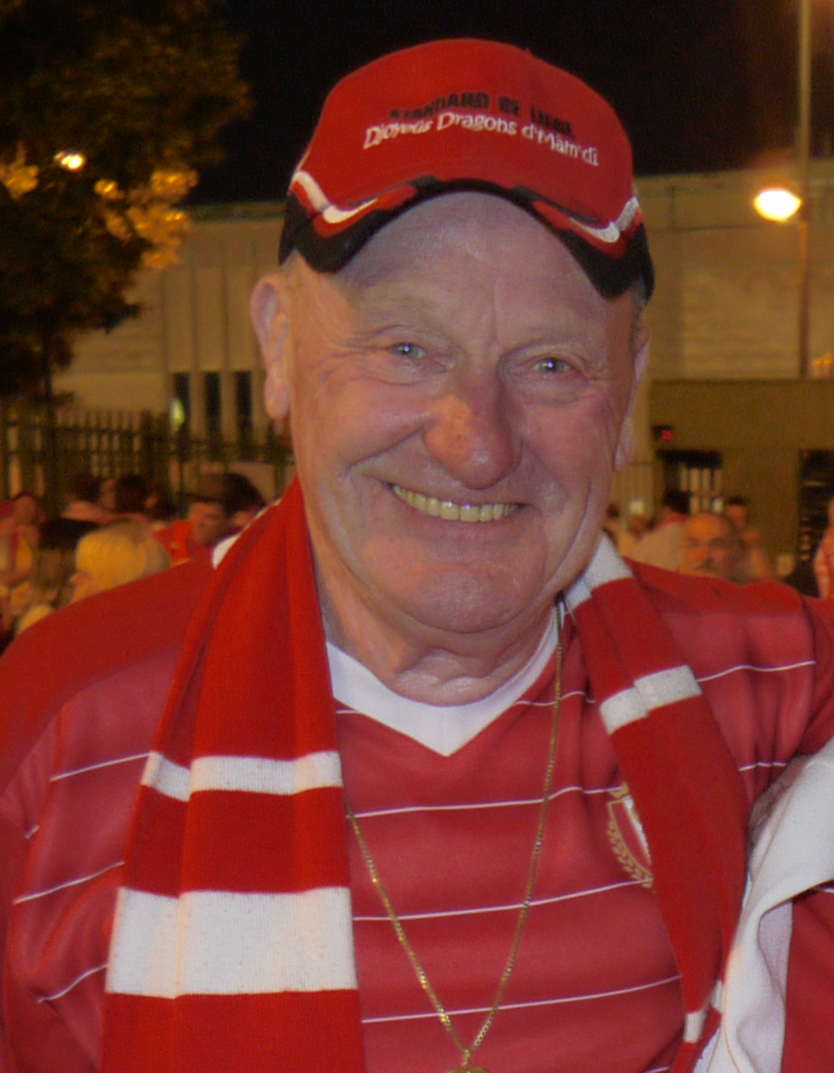
- Rion in 2011
- Born: 10 June 1933; Dalhem, Belgium
- Died: 3 November 2022 (aged 89)
- Occupation: Football referee

Francis Rion (10 June 1933 – 3 November 2022) was a Belgian football referee. He was an international referee until 1981 and notably officiated the 1978 FIFA World Cup quarterfinal between Italy and Austria, a 1 to 0 victory for the Italians.

In 1994, Rion founded a referee supporters' club in Malmedy named Lès Djoyeûs Dragons d'Mâm'dî with the support of Standard Liège. He became honorary president of the club in 2013. In 2015, he was made an honorary member of the Famille des Rouches, an associate of supporters of Standard Liège.
