= Levon Ishtoyan =

Soviet footballer

Personal information
- Full name: Levon Arutyunovich Ishtoyan
- Date of birth: 31 October 1947 (age 78)
- Place of birth: Leninakan, Soviet Union
- Position: Striker

Senior career*
Years	Team	Apps	(Gls)
1967	FC Shirak	91	(8)
1968 – 1975	FC Ararat Yerevan	196	(28)

International career
1971 – 1974	USSR	8	(0)

Managerial career
- 1984 – 1985: FC Ararat Yerevan (assistant)
- * Club domestic league appearances and goals

Levon Arutyunovich Ishtoyan (Armenian: Լեվոն Իշտոյան, Russian: Левон Арутюнович Иштоян), born 31 October 1947 in Leninakan, Soviet Union) is a retired Soviet football striker. He emigrated to the United States in the late 1980s and opened a private sportschool in Los Angeles in 2008 called Ishtoyan Soccer Academy.

== Honours ==
- Soviet Top League winner: 1973.
- Soviet Cup winner: 1973, 1975.

== International career ==
Ishtoyan made his debut for USSR on 18 September 1971 in a friendly against India. He played in UEFA Euro 1972 qualifiers, but was not selected for the final tournament squad. He also played in a 1974 FIFA World Cup qualifier against France.
