= 1973–74 FC Zürich season =

Associan football season

FC Zürich
1973–74 season
- Owner: Edwin Nägeli
- Chairman: Edwin Nägeli
- Head coach: Friedhelm Konietzka
- Stadium: Letzigrund
- 1973–74 Nationalliga A: Champions
- 1973–74 Swiss Cup: Round 5
- 1973 Swiss League Cup: Round 1
- 1973–74 European Cup Winners' Cup: Quarter-finals
- 1973 Intertoto Cup: Group 4 winners
- Top goalscorer: League: Jeandupeux (22); All: Jeandupeux (26)

The 1973–74 season was FC Zürich's 77th season in their existence, since their foundation in 1896. It was their 15th consecutive season in the top flight of Swiss football, following their promotion at the end of the 1957–58 season. They played their home games in the Letzigrund.

== Overview ==
The club's president at this time was Edwin Nägeli, who had held this position since 1957. The FCZ first team head-coach for the third consecutive season was the German Friedhelm Konietzka. The first team competed not only in the first-tier 1973–74 Nationalliga A, but also competed in 1973–74 Swiss Cup and in the newly created 1973 Swiss League Cup. Further the team entered into the 1973 Intertoto Cup and had qualified for the 1973–74 European Cup Winners' Cup by winning the 1972–73 Swiss Cup.

== Players ==
The following is the list of the FCZ first team squad this season. It also includes players that were in the squad the day the season started on 18 August 1973, but subsequently left the club after that date.

Note: Flags indicate national team as defined under FIFA eligibility rules; some limited exceptions apply. Players may hold more than one non-FIFA nationality.

No.	Pos.	Nation	Player
1	GK	SUI	Karl Grob (league games: 26)
—	GK	SUI	Hanspeter Janser (league games: 0)
—	GK	SUI	Ruedi Hauser (league games: 0)
—	DF	SUI	Hilmar Zigerlig (league games: 26)
—	DF	SUI	Renzo Bionda (league games: 25)
—	DF	SUI	Pirmin Stierli (league games: 24)
—	DF	SUI	Max Heer (league games: 22)
—	DF	GER	Hubert Münch (league games: 8)
—	DF	SUI	Giuseppe Sanfilippo (league games: 1)
—	MF	SUI	René Botteron (league games: 26)

No.	Pos.	Nation	Player
—	MF	SUI	Rosario Martinelli (league games: 26)
—	MF	SUI	Jakob Kuhn (league games: 25)
—	MF	SUI	Ernst Rutschmann (league games: 25)
—	MF	SUI	Walter Iselin (league games: 10)
—	FW	SUI	Daniel Jeandupeux (league games: 26)
—	FW	SUI	Ilija Katić (league games: 26)
—	FW	SUI	Peter Marti (league games: 15)
—	FW	SUI	Erwin Schweizer (league games: 2)
—	FW	SUI	Pius Senn (league games: 2)
—	FW	SUI	René Rietmann (league games: 1)
—	FW	GER	Friedhelm Konietzka (league games: 0)

Players who left the squad

Note: Flags indicate national team as defined under FIFA eligibility rules; some limited exceptions apply. Players may hold more than one non-FIFA nationality.

No.	Pos.	Nation	Player
—	DF	SUI	Albert Wyss
—	DF	SUI	Peter Hafner
—	MF	SUI	Heinz Ernst
—	MF	SUI	Umberto Foschini
—	MF	SUI	Joszef Turan

No.	Pos.	Nation	Player
—	FW	SUI	Fritz Künzli (to FC Winterthur)
—	FW	GER	Rudi Brunnenmeier (to SW Bregenz)
—	FW	SUI	Johannes Gnädinger
—	FW	ITA	Armando Arisi
—	FW	SUI	Hansueli Zürcher

== Results ==
Legend

Win Draw Loss Postponed

=== Nationalliga ===
==== League matches ====
18 August 1973 Round 1	Young Boys	2–2	Zürich	Wankdorf Stadium, Bern
20:15	Cornioley 10' (1:0); Andersen 57' (2:1)	FCZ summary	30' (1:1) Katić; 60' (2:2) Jeandupeux; (penalty missed) 75′ Kuhn	Attendance: 14,000; Referee: (Switzerland) Roland Racine (Prilly)

25 August 1973 Round 2	Zürich	2–1	Winterthur	Letzigrund, Zürich
20:15	Botteron 9' (1:0); Martinelli 79' (2:1); Katić (yellow card) 87'	FCZ summary	30' (1:1) Risi; (yellow card) 40' Oettli	Attendance: 12,000; Referee: (Switzerland) Ulysse Darbellay (Roche, Vaud)

28 August 1973 Round 3	Zürich	4–2	Lausanne-Sport	Letzigrund, Zürich
20:15	Katić 4' (1:0); Jeandupeux 17' (2:0); Katić 48' (3:0); Kuhn (yellow card) 79'; Jeandupeux 85' (4:1)	FCZ summary	(yellow card) 43' Loichat; 67' (3:1) Müller; 88' (4:2) Parietti	Attendance: 11,000; Referee: (Switzerland) Roland Keller (Kehrsatz, Bern)
Note: The wet pitch was still smooth and slippery following an afternoon thunderstorm.

1 September 1973 Round 4	Grasshopper Club	1–1	Zürich	Hardturm, Zürich
20:15	Grahn 37' (1:1); Noventa (yellow card) 47'; Grahn (yellow card) 60'	FCZ summary	1' (0:1) Stierli	Attendance: 23,000; Referee: Rudolf Scheurer (Bettlach, Switzerland)

8 September 1973 Round 13	La Chaux-de-Fonds	0–2	Zürich	Stade Charrière, La Chaux-de-Fonds
20:15		FCZ summary	39' (0:1) Jeandupeux; 52' (0:2) Rutschmann; (yellow card) Zigerlig	Attendance: 4,200; Referee: (Switzerland) Bruno della Bruna (Lumino)
Note: Game brought forward from 16 December 1973.

15 September 1973 Round 5	Zürich	4–0	Chênois	Letzigrund, Zürich
20:15	(Dufour) 43' (o.g.); Jeandupeux 48' (2:0); Jeandupeux 56' (3:0); Katić 88' (4:0)	FCZ summary		Attendance: 6,000; Referee: (Switzerland) Jean Dubach (Nidau)

30 September 1973 Round 6	Lugano	1–2	Zürich	Cornaredo, Lugano
15:00	Mabillard 38' (1:1)	FCZ summary	25' (0:1) Jeandupeux; 55' (og 1:2) (Lanfranconi)	Attendance: 3,500; Referee: (Switzerland) Paul Uldry (Meyrin)

13 October 1973 Round 7	Zürich	1–0	Sion	Letzigrund, Zürich
17:30	Jeandupeux 24' (1:0)	FCZ summary		Attendance: 4,000; Referee: (Switzerland) Ernst Dörflinger (Grenchen and Basel)

27 October 1973 Round 8	Basel	1–3	Zürich	St. Jakob Stadium, Basel
20:00	Hitzfeld 89' (1:3)	FCZ summary Summary	35' (0:1) Jeandupeux; 29' (0:2) Katić; 72' (0:3) Rutschmann	Attendance: 25,000; Referee: (Switzerland) Anton Bucheli (Luzern)
Note: A very cold, almost wintry evening. The ground was wet and slippery, but still playable.

11 November 1973 Round 9	Zürich	1–1	Xamax	Letzigrund, Zürich
14:00	Jeandupeux 19' (1:0); Marti (yellow card) 67'	FCZ summary	86' (1:1) Richard	Attendance: 23,500; Referee: Rudolf Scheurer (Bettlach, Switzerland)

24 November 1973 Round 10	St. Gallen	2–3	Zürich	Espenmoos, St. Gallen
17:00	Güggi (yellow card) 35'; Bigler (yellow card) 46'; Blättler 76' (1:3); Blättler 86' (2:3)	FCZ summary	6' (0:1) Rutschmann; (yellow card) 40' Stierli; 41' (0:2) Katić; 47' (0:3) Jeandupeux; (yellow card) 78' Heer	Attendance: 9,700; Referee: (Switzerland) Ulysse Darbellay (Roche, Vaud)

1 December 1973 Round 11	Chiasso	0–1	Zürich	Stadio Comunale Riva IV, Chiasso
14:30		FCZ summary	(yellow card) 40' Kuhn; 47' (0:1) Kuhn; (yellow card) 67' Botteron	Attendance: 3,000; Referee: (Switzerland) Ernst Dörflinger (Grenchen and Basel)
Note: Good playable pitch, but very cold.

9 December 1973 Round 12	Zürich	1–1	Servette	Letzigrund, Zürich
14:30	Martinelli 67' (1:1); Heer (yellow card) 69'	FCZ summary	61' (0:1) Petrović; (yellow card) 66' Morgenegg; (yellow card) 69' Petrović; (yellow card) 70' Castella; (yellow card) 79' Guyot; (yellow card) 88' Németh	Attendance: 7,000; Referee: (Switzerland) Fernand Burioli (Lausanne)
Note: Soft, bumpy and soon rutted, difficult-to-play pitch.

2 March 1973 Round 14	Zürich	3–0	Young Boys	Letzigrund, Zürich
17:00	Botteron 18' (1:0); Katić 51' (2:0); Kuhn (yellow card) 59'; Katić 78' (3:0)	FCZ summary	(yellow card) 32' Schmocker; (yellow card) 80' Trümpler; (yellow card) 89' Vögeli	Attendance: 5,700; Referee: (Switzerland) René Matthieu (Sierre)
Note: Snowfall before the start of the game. Deep, bumpy and therefore treacherous pitch.

10 March 1974 Round 15	Winterthur	1–1	Zürich	Schützenwiese, Winterthur
15:00	Künzli 26' (1:0)	FCZ summary	69' (1:1) Rutschmann; (yellow card) Zigerlig	Attendance: 12,000; Referee: (Switzerland) Pierre Despont (Lausanne)

16 March 1974 Round 16	Zürich	1–0	Grasshopper Club	Letzigrund, Zürich
16:30	(Malzacher) 2' (o.g.)	FCZ summary		Attendance: 15,000; Referee: (Switzerland) Jean Dubach (Nidau)
Note: Torrential rain before and throughout the entire game. Terrain deep, heavy, and slippery.

30 March 1974 Round 17	Chênois	0–2	Zürich	Stade des Trois-Chêne, Thônex
17:30		FCZ summary	5' (0:1) Kuhn; 39' (0:2) Kuhn	Attendance: 5,500; Referee: (Switzerland) Anton Bucheli (Luzern)

6 April 1974 Round 18	Zürich	4–0	Lugano	Letzigrund, Zürich
17:00	Katić 6' (1:0); Martinelli 20' (2:0); Kuhn 59' (3:0); Martinelli 70' (4:0)	FCZ summary		Attendance: 7,500; Referee: (Switzerland) Hans Wieland (Grenchen)

20 April 1974 Round 19	Sion	2–1	Zürich	Stade Tourbillon, Sion
	Dayen (yellow card) 40'; Barberis (yellow card) 55'; Herrmann 62' (1:1); Luttrop (yellow card) 71'; Isoz 75' (2:1)	FCZ summary	59' (0:1) Rutschmann	Attendance: 12,000; Referee: (Switzerland) Rudolf Rettig (Gerlafingen)

28 April 1974 Round 20	Zürich	5–1	Basel	Letzigrund, Zürich
15:15	Fischli 23' (o.g. 1:0); Katic 52' (2:1); Martinelli 53' (3:1); Jeandupeux 65' (4:1); Katic 88' (5:1)	Summary	40' (pen. 1:1) Hitzfeld	Attendance: 26,000 (sold-out); Referee: (Switzerland) Rudolf Scheurer Bettlach

4 May 1974 Round 21	Xamax	1–3	Zürich	Stade de la Maladière (1924), Neuchâtel
18:15	Traber 90' (1:3)	FCZ summary	9' (0:1) Rutschmann; 14' (0:2) Rutschmann; 75' (0:3) Bionda	Attendance: 10,200; Referee: (Switzerland) Anton Bucheli (Luzern)

11 May 1974 Round 22	Zürich	3–0	St. Gallen	Letzigrund, Zürich
18:00	Jeandupeux 77' (1:0); Jeandupeux 86' (2:0); Marti 88' (3:0)	FCZ summary		Attendance: 7,500; Referee: (Switzerland) René Matthieu (Sierre)

14 May 1974 Round 23	Lausanne-Sport	1–3	Zürich	Olympique de la Pontaise, Lausanne
	Chapuisat (yellow card) 29'; Müller 74' (1:1)	FCZ summary	14' (0:1) Jeandupeux; 84' (1:2) Jeandupeux; 87' (1:3) Katić	Attendance: 8,500; Referee: (Switzerland) Roland Keller (Kehrsatz, Bern)

18 May 1974 Round 24	Zürich	5–1	Chiasso	Letzigrund, Zürich
18:55	Rutschmann 21' (1:1); Katić 29' (2:1); Jeandupeux 40' (3:1); Martinelli 64' (4:1); Jeandupeux 68' (5:1); Heer (yellow card) 83'	FCZ summary	1' (0:1) Calcagno	Attendance: 5,500; Referee: (Switzerland) Ernest Guignet (Yverdon-les-Bains)
Note: The game started at 5:55 PM (not 6:00 PM) so Chiasso could catch their train home. Chiasso scored after 58 seconds.

25 May 1974 Round 25	Servette	0–1	Zürich	Charmilles Stadium, Geneva
20:30		FCZ summary	(yellow card) 5' Rutschmann; 80' (0:1) Jeandupeux	Attendance: 14,500; Referee: (Switzerland) Ernst Dörflinger (Grenchen and Basel)
Note: 42' Failure of one lighting mast, back in operation from the 60'.

1 June 1974 Round 26	Zürich	8–1	La Chaux-de-Fonds	Letzigrund, Zürich
20:15	Botteron 4' (1:0); Martinelli 9' (2:0); Katić 13' (3:0); Katić 47' (4:0); Jeandupeux 58' (5:0); Jeandupeux 60' (6:0); Katić 62' (7:0); Jeandupeux 82' (8:1)	FCZ summary	72' (pen.) Sandoz	Attendance: 12,500; Referee: (Switzerland) Roland Racine (Prilly)

==== Final league table ====
Pos	Team	Pld	W	D	L	GF	GA	GD	Pts	Qualification
1	Zürich	26	20	5	1	67	20	+47	45	Champions, qualified for 1974–75 European Cup and entered 1974 Intertoto Cup
2	Grasshopper Club	26	12	9	5	41	27	+14	33	Qualified for 1974–75 UEFA Cup and entered 1974 Intertoto Cup
3	Servette	26	12	8	6	49	35	+14	32	Qualified for 1974–75 UEFA Cup
4	Winterthur	26	13	6	7	42	29	+13	32	Entered 1974 Intertoto Cup
5	Basel	26	13	3	10	57	39	+18	29	
6	Young Boys	26	10	8	8	52	38	+14	28	
7	Xamax	26	10	6	10	38	38	0	26	Entered 1974 Intertoto Cup
8	Lausanne-Sport	26	9	8	9	45	48	−3	26	
9	St. Gallen	26	10	5	11	38	48	−10	25	
10	Sion	26	5	12	9	24	31	−7	22	Swiss Cup winners, qualified for 1974–75 Cup Winners' Cup
11	Chênois	26	7	8	11	30	48	−18	22	
12	Lugano	26	4	9	13	20	44	−24	17	
13	La Chaux-de-Fonds	26	3	10	13	28	51	−23	16	Relegated to 1974–75 Nationalliga B
14	Chiasso	26	2	7	17	18	53	−35	11	Relegated to 1974–75 Nationalliga B

Source: rsssf.com
Rules for classification: 1) Points; 2) Goal difference within the league, however with play-off for qualifiers;

=== Swiss Cup ===
22 September 1973 Round 4	Juventus Zürich	1–5	Zürich	Mülligen, Zürich
	Kappeler 68' (1:3)	FCZ summary	19' (0:1) Marti; 21' (0:2) Katić; 32' (0:3) Stierli; 73' (1:4) Katić; 77' (1:5) Iselin	Attendance: 2,400; Referee: (Switzerland) Hans Wieland (Grenchen)

7 October 1973 Round 5	Zürich	2–3	St. Gallen	Letzigrund, Zürich
	Stierli 14' (1:0); Jeandupeux 19' (2:0); Bionda (yellow card)	FCZ summary	47' (2:1) Leuzinger; 55' (2:2) Blättler; 72' (2:3) Blättler; (yellow card) Blättler; (yellow card) Nasdalla	Attendance: 7,600; Referee: (Switzerland) René Matthieu (Sierre)

=== Swiss League Cup ===
11 August 1973 Round 1	Zürich	1–1 (a.e.t.) (3–4 p)	Grasshopper Club	Letzigrund, Zürich
	Kuhn 83' (pen 1:1)	FCZ summary	21' (0:1) Grahn	Attendance: 11,000; Referee: (Switzerland) Hans Wieland (Grenchen)
	Penalties
	Kuhn (penalty missed); Jeandupeux (penalty missed); Bionda (penalty scored); Botteron (penalty scored); Zigerlig (penalty scored)		(penalty missed) Gross; (penalty scored) Noventa; (penalty scored) Meier; (penalty scored) Winiger; (penalty scored) Grahn

=== Cup Winners' Cup ===
19 September 1973 Round 1 first leg	Anderlecht (Belgium)	3–2	(Switzerland) Zürich	Émile Versé Stadium, Brussels
	Rensenbrink 46' (1:2); Rensenbrink 49' (2:2); Rensenbrink 52' (3:2)	FCZ summary	Stierli 21' (0:1); Katić 29' (0:2)	Attendance: 14,729; Referee: (Scotland) Alistair McKenzie

3 October 1973 Return leg	Zürich (Switzerland)	1–0 (3–3 agg.)	(Belgium) Anderlecht	Letzigrund, Zürich
	Rutschmann 29' (pen.)			Attendance: 19,658; Referee: (Spain) Antonio Rigo Sureda

3-3 on aggregate, Zürich won on away goals.

23 October 1973 Round 2	Zürich (Switzerland)	0–0	(Sweden) Malmö FF	Letzigrund, Zürich
	Rutschmann (yellow card) 45'	FCZ summary	(yellow card) 42' Andersson	Attendance: 10,957; Referee: Antoine Queudeville (Luxembourg)
Note: Very cold, deep terrain.

4 November 1973 Return leg	Malmö FF (Sweden)	1–1 (1–1 agg.)	(Switzerland) Zürich	Malmö Stadion, Malmö
	Malmberg 23'; Andersson (yellow card) 90'	FCZ summary	(yellow card) 36' Martinelli; 68' Katić	Attendance: 7,469; Referee: Günter Männig (East Germany)

1-1 on aggregate, Zürich won on away goals.

6 March 1974 Quarter-final first leg	Sporting CP (Portugal)	3–0	(Switzerland) Zürich	Estádio José Alvalade, Lisbon
	Nélson 55'; Marinho 57'; Manaca (yellow card) 75'; Yazalde 80'	FCZ summary	(yellow card) 78' Zigerlig	Attendance: 41,280; Referee: Hans-Joachim Weyland (West Germany)
Note: First game with new floodlights.

20 March 1974 Quarter-final return leg	Zürich (Switzerland)	1–1 (1–4 agg.)	(Portugal) Sporting CP	Letzigrund, Zürich
	Botteron 7'	FCZ summary	18' Baltasar; (yellow card) 37' (yellow-red card) 52' Nélson	Attendance: 13,697; Referee: György Müncz (Hungary)

Sporting CP won 4–1 on aggregate.

=== Intertoto Cup ===
==== Group 4 matches ====
7 July 1973 Round 1	Slavia Prague (Czechoslovakia)	2–1	(Switzerland) Zürich	Prague
	Barták 70' (1:1); Veselý 85' (2:1)	FCZ summary	46' (0:1) Martinelli	Attendance: 4,500; Referee: (Czechoslovakia) Zdeněk Jelínek

14 July 1973 Round 2	Zürich (Switzerland)	4–4	(Sweden) Norrköping	Letzigrund, Zürich
18:30	Martinelli 3' (1:0); Marti 6' (2:0); Martinelli 21' (3:0); Rutschmann 61' (4:1)	FCZ summary	50' (3:1) Stern; 77' (4:2) Wendt; 83' (4:3) Hult; 84' (4:4) Danielsson	Attendance: 7,500; Referee: (Switzerland) André Favre (Echallens)
Note: Double match: 18:30 FCZ vs. Norrköpping, 20:15 Grasshoppers vs. Hertha BSC Berlin

21 July 1973 Round 3	Zürich (Switzerland)	3–0	(Czechoslovakia) Slavia Prague	Letzigrund, Zürich
18:00	Kuhn 66' (1:0); Botteron 70' (2:0); Jeandupeux 79' (3:0)	FCZ summary		Attendance: 2,800; Referee: (Switzerland) Bruno della Bruna

28 July 1973 Round 4	Norrköping (Sweden)	1–2	(Switzerland) Zürich	Norrköping
	Kindvall 53' (1:1)	FCZ summary	15' (0:1) Botteron; 60' (1:2) Martinelli	Attendance: 3,000

1 August 1973 Round 5	Zürich (Switzerland)	4–1	(France) Nancy	Letzigrund, Zürich
16:00	Jeandupeux 8' (1:0); Martinelli 27' (2:0); Martinelli 30' (3:0); Stierli 58' (4:1)	FCZ summary	40' (3:1) Prost; (yellow card) Bauda; (yellow card) Vicq	Attendance: 5,500; Referee: (Switzerland) Roland Racine (Prilly)

5 August 1973 Round 6	Nancy (France)	1–1	(Switzerland) Zürich	Stade Marcel Picot, Tomblaine, France
	Herbet 32' (1:0)	FCZ summary	78' (1:1) Jeandupeux	Attendance: 6,000

==== Final group table ====
Pos	Team	Pld	W	D	L	GF	GA	GD	Pts	ZÜR	SLA	NAN	NOR
1	(Switzerland) Zürich	6	3	2	1	15	9	+6	8	—	3–0	4–1	4–4
2	(Czechoslovakia) Slavia Prague	6	3	1	2	9	7	+2	7	2–1	—	2–1	4–0
3	(France) Nancy	6	2	1	3	7	13	−6	5	1–1	1–0	—	2–1
4	(Sweden) Norrköping	6	1	2	3	12	14	−2	4	1–2	1–1	5–1	—

Source: mogiel.net
Rules for classification: 1) Points; 2) Goal difference; 3) Goals scored; 4) Head-to-head points; 5) Away goals scored; 6) Draw.

=== Friendly matches ===
==== Pre- and mid-season ====
28 June 1973 Pre-season	FC Uzwil	2–1	Zürich	Rüti, Uzwil
	Weber 36' (1:0); Gregorin 76' (2:1)	FCZ summary	(penalty missed) 65′ Martinelli; 65' (1:1) Martinelli	Attendance: 1,000; Referee: (Switzerland) Mario Osta (Oberuzwil)
Note: Uzwil played in the 1. Liga in 1973–74.

6 September 1973 Mid-season	FC Trimbach	1–2	Zürich	Sportanlage Leinfeld, Trimbach
	Goal	FCZ summary	Goal	Attendance: 1,300

17 November 1973 Mid-season	Bellinzona	0–2	Zürich	Stadio Comunale, Bellinzona
		FCZ summary	60' (0:1) Katić; 65' (0:2) Senn	Attendance: 500; Referee: (Switzerland) Bruno della Bruna (Lumino)
Note: Corners 2:10

==== Winter break and mid-season ====
26 January 1974 Winter break	FC Deitingen	3–6	Zürich	Grabmatt, Deitingen
	Hert 53' (1:3); Hert 61' (2:4); Galli 75' (3:5)	FCZ summary	8' (0:1) Martinelli; 45' (0:2) Martinelli; 50' (0:3) Jeandupeux; 55' (1:4) Martinelli; 67' (pen.) Katić; 81' (3:6) Martinelli	Attendance: 900; Referee: (Switzerland) Rudolf Rettig (Gerlafingen)
Note: Pitch very suitable for play

27 January 1974 Winter break	FC Kickers Luzern	2–7	Zürich	Stadion Auf Tribschen, Lucerne
	Wüest 68' (1:6); Wüest 90' (2:7)	FCZ summary	1' (0:1) Schweizer; 18' (0:2) Kuhn; 28' (0:3) Katić; 39' (0:4) Schweizer; 43' (0:5) Martinelli; 48' (0:6) Jeandupeux; 89' (1:7) Schweizer	Attendance: 600; Referee: (Switzerland) Anton Bucheli (Luzern)
Note: Difficult pitch that was bordering on unplayable in the second half.

2 February 1974 Winter break	Kriens	0–4	Zürich	Stadion Kleinfeld, Kriens
		FCZ summary	12' (0:1) Martinelli; 28' (0:2) Martinelli; 34' (0:3) Rutschmann; 52' (0:4) Katić	Attendance: 300; Referee: (Switzerland) Gottlieb Barmettler (Luzern)

3 February 1974 Winter break	Aarau	1–1	Zürich	Stadion Brügglifeld, Aarau
	Züttel 55' (1:1)	FCZ summary	44' (0:1) Botteron	Attendance: 1,900; Referee: (Switzerland) Kurt Fuchs (Basel)
Note: Good conditions for the game

9 February 1974 Winter break	Basel	5–1	Zürich	Landhof, Basel
14:30	Stohler 3' (1:0); Balmer 17' (2:0); Balmer 45' (3:0); Balmer 50' (4:0); Hasler 41' (pen. 5:1)	FCZ summary FCB summary	72' (4:1) Katić	Attendance: 1,800; Referee: (Switzerland) Josef Schnidrig (Röschenz)
Note: Very soft conditions. Corners 4:9-

16 February 1974 Winter break	A.C. Arezzo	0–2	Zürich	Stadio Città di Arezzo, Arezzo, Italy
		FCZ summary	31' (0:1) Katić; 76' (0:2) Jeandupeux
Note: Arezzo played in Serie B (Italy) in 1974. Arezzo fielded their first team in the first half and their youth team in the second half.

24 February 1974 Winter break	Servette	2–0	Zürich	Colovray Sports Centre, Nyon
	Guyot 43' (1:0); Barriquand 62' (2:0)	FCZ summary		Attendance: 2,000; Referee: (Switzerland) Ghidoni (Geneva)
Note: Pitch in good condition, sunny, but windy.

16 April 1974 Mid-season	Zürich	0–1	Hamburger SV	Letzigrund, Zürich
20:00		FCZ summary	85' (0:1) Ripp	Attendance: 5,500; Referee: (Switzerland) Walter Hungerbühler (St. Gallen)
Note: Heavy snowfall at the beginning of the match

24 April 1974 Mid-season	FC Langenthal	2–3	Zürich	Einschlag, Reinach, Aargau
	Neuenschwander 59' (1:1); Neuenschwander 70' (2:2)	FCZ summary	3' (0:1) Katić; 61' (1:2) Zigerlig; 81' (2:3) Jeandupeux	Attendance: 1,300; Referee: (Switzerland) Werner Bösch (Sutz-Lattrigen)

== Sources and references ==
- Switzerland 1973–74 at RSSSF
- Swiss League Cup at RSSSF

Preceded by 1972–73	FC Zürich seasons	Succeeded by 1974–75
