= 1972–73 FC Zürich season =

Associan football season

FC Zürich
1972–73 season
- Owner: Edwin Nägeli
- Chairman: Edwin Nägeli
- Head coach: Friedhelm Konietzka
- Stadium: Letzigrund
- 1972–73 Nationalliga A: Seventh
- 1972–73 Swiss Cup: Winners
- 1972 Swiss League Cup: Round 1
- 1972–73 European Cup Winners' Cup: First round
- 1973 Intertoto Cup: Group 5, Third
- Top goalscorer: League: Daniel Jeandupeux (9 goals); All: Fritz Künzli (18 goals)

The 1972–73 season was FC Zürich's 76th season in their existence, since their foundation in 1896. It was their 14th consecutive season in the top flight of Swiss football, following their promotion the 1957–58 season. They played their home games in the Letzigrund.

== Overview ==
The club's president at this time was Edwin Nägeli and their first team head-coach was the German Friedhelm Konietzka. The first team competed not only in the first-tier Nationalliga but also competed in this season's Swiss Cup and in the newly created Swiss League Cup. Further the team entered into the International Football Cup and had qualified for the Cup Winners' Cup by winning the 1971–72 Swiss Cup.

== Players ==
The following is the list of the Zürich first team squad. It also includes players that were in the squad the day the season started on 24 June 1972, but subsequently left the club after that date. Note: Flags indicate national team as defined under FIFA eligibility rules; some limited exceptions apply. Players may hold more than one non-FIFA nationality.

No.	Pos.	Nation	Player
1	GK	SUI	Karl Grob (league games: 26)
—	GK	SUI	Hanspeter Janser (league games: 0)
—	DF	SUI	Hilmar Zigerlig (league games: 25)
—	DF	SUI	Max Heer (league games: 24)
—	DF	SUI	Renzo Bionda (league games: 24)
—	DF	SUI	Pirmin Stierli (league games: 23)
—	DF	GER	Hubert Münch (league games: 20)
—	DF	SUI	Albert Wyss (league games: 1)
—	DF	SUI	Peter Hafner (league games: 2)
—	MF	SUI	Walter Iselin (league games: 2)
—	MF	SUI	Jakob Kuhn (league games: 23)
—	MF	ITA	Rosario Martinelli (league games: 19)
—	MF	SUI	Ernst Rutschmann (league games: 12)

No.	Pos.	Nation	Player
—	MF	SUI	Heinz Ernst (league games: 10)
—	MF	SUI	Umberto Foschini (league games: 2)
—	MF	SUI	Joszef Turan (league games: 1)
—	FW	SUI	Fritz Künzli (league games: 19)
—	FW	SUI	Daniel Jeandupeux (league games: 24)
—	FW	GER	Rudi Brunnenmeier (league games: 20)
—	FW	SUI	Erwin Schweizer (league games: 14)
—	FW	SUI	Peter Marti (league games: 15)
—	FW	GER	Friedhelm Konietzka (league games: 9)
—	FW	SUI	Johannes Gnädinger (league games: 0)
—	FW	ITA	Armando Arisi (league games: 2)
—	FW	SUI	René Rietmann (league games: 1)
—	FW	SUI	Hansueli Zürcher (league games: 1)

== Results ==
Legend

Win Draw Loss Postponed

=== Nationalliga A ===
==== League matches ====
12 August 1972 Round 1	St. Gallen	1–3	Zürich	Espenmoos, St. Gallen
18:00	Leuzinger 37' (1:1)	FCZ Summary	(penalty missed) 17′ Jeandupeux; 21' (pen.) Jeandupeux; 79' (1:2) Künzli; 84' (1:3) Künzli; (yellow card) Jeandupeux	Attendance: 5,100; Referee: (Switzerland) Roland Keller (Kehrsatz, Bern)

19 August 1972 Round 2	Zürich	0–1	Chiasso	Letzigrund, Zürich
20:15	Kuhn (penalty missed) 80′	FCZ summary	23' (0:1) Allio	Attendance: 6,500; Referee: (Switzerland) Fernand Burioli (Lausanne)

23 August 1972 Round 3	Zürich	1–1	Basel	Letzigrund, Zürich
20:15	Jeandupeux 10' (1:1)	FCZ summary FCB summary	2' (0:1) Mundschin; (yellow card) 15' Fischli	Attendance: 19,000; Referee: (Switzerland) Jean Dubach (Nidau)

26 August 1972 Round 4	Lausanne-Sport	1–2	Zürich	Olympique de la Pontaise, Lausanne
20:30	Grahn 14' (1:0); Guggisberg (yellow card) 39'; Vuilleumier (yellow card) 78'	FCZ summary	(yellow card) 34' Bionda; (penalty missed) 34′ Jeandupeux; 56' (1:1) Brunnenmeier; (penalty missed) 78′ Brunnenmeier; 78' (1:2) Brunnenmeier	Attendance: 10,000; Referee: Rudolf Scheurer (Bettlach, Switzerland)

2 September 1972 Round 5	Zürich	2–0	La Chaux-de-Fonds	Letzigrund, Zürich
	Kuhn 43' (pen.); Brunnenmeier 86' (1:0)	FCZ summary	(yellow card) Veya	Attendance: 4,500; Referee: (Switzerland) Bruno della Bruna (Lumino)

9 September 1972 Round 6	Young Boys	0–1	Zürich	Wankdorf Stadium, Bern
20:15	Vögeli (yellow card); Trümpler (yellow card)	FCZ summary	32' (o.g.) (Messerli); (yellow card) Zigerlig; (yellow card) Jeandupeux	Attendance: 12,000; Referee: (Switzerland) Roland Racine (Prilly)

16 September 1972 Round 7	Lugano	0–0	Zürich	Cornaredo, Lugano
16:30	Lanfranconi (yellow card)	FCZ summary		Attendance: 6,500; Referee: (Switzerland) André Favre (Échallens)

24 September 1972 Round 8	Zürich	1–2	Sion	Letzigrund, Zürich
15:15	Jeandupeux 22' (1:1); Münch (yellow card)	FCZ summary	17' (0:1) Quentin; 86' (1:2) Luisier	Attendance: 6,500; Referee: (Switzerland) Ernest Guignet (Yverdon-les-Bains)

30 September 1972 Round 9	Winterthur	3–0	Zürich	Schützenwiese, Winterthur
17:15	Nielsen 49' (1:0); Risi 57' (2:0); Oettli 90' (3:0)	FCZ summary		Attendance: 10,000; Referee: (Switzerland) Mario Clematide (Zollikofen)

8 October 1972 Round 10	Zürich	3–2	Servette	Letzigrund, Zürich
15:30	Künzli 47' (1:0); Heer 80' (2:1); Künzli 88' (3:1)	FCZ summary	24' (1:1) Castella; 90' (3:2) Pfister	Attendance: 6,500; Referee: (Switzerland) Gérard Racine (La Neuveville)

15 October 1972 Round 11	Fribourg	1–0	Zürich	Stade Universitaire Saint-Léonard, Fribourg
15:00	Holenstein 1' (1:0)	FCZ summary		Attendance: 7,000

29 October 1972 Round 12	Zürich	4–0	Grenchen	Letzigrund, Zürich
15:00	Künzli 14' (1:0); Künzli 25' (2:0); Künzli 63' (3:0); Martinelli 80' (4:0)	FCZ summary		Attendance: 9,300; Referee: (Switzerland) Ulysse Darbellay (Roche, Vaud)

19 November 1972 Round 13	Grasshopper Club	3–0	Zürich	Hardturm, Zürich
14:45	Schneeberger 35' (1:0); Schneeberger (yellow card) 35'; Gröbli 52' (pen. 2:0); Dimmeler 89' (3:0)	FCZ summary	(yellow card) 52' Grob; (yellow card) 53' Kuhn	Attendance: 14,000; Referee: (Switzerland) Roland Racine (Prilly)

3 December 1972 Round 14	Zürich	5–3	St. Gallen	Letzigrund, Zürich
14:45	(Rafreider) 30' (o.g.); Künzli 32' (2:0); Schweizer 35' (3:0); Kuhn 55' (pen. 4:2); Jeandupeux 73' (5:2)	FCZ summary	47' (3:1) Nasdalla; 53' (3:2) Leuzinger; 84' (5:3) Cina; (yellow card) Brander	Attendance: 6,500; Referee: (Switzerland) Fernand Burioli (Lausanne)

4 March 1973 Round 15	Chiasso	0–0	Zürich	Stadio Comunale Riva IV, Chiasso
15:00	Croci-Torti (yellow card) 46'	FCZ summary		Attendance: 4,000; Referee: (Switzerland) Jean Dubach (Nidau)

11 March 1973 Round 16	Zürich	0–0	Lausanne-Sport	Letzigrund, Zürich
14:45	Künzli (yellow card) 88'	FCZ summary	(yellow card) 54' Kaeser; (yellow card) 79' Ostojić; (yellow card) 89' Grobet	Attendance: 6,700; Referee: (Switzerland) Mario Clematide (Zollikofen)

18 March 1973 Round 17	La Chaux-de-Fonds	P–P	Zürich	Stade Charrière, La Chaux-de-Fonds
		[ FCZ summary]

1 April 1973 Round 18	Zürich	2–0	Young Boys	Letzigrund, Zürich
15:00	Brunnenmeier 14' (1:0); Kuhn (yellow card) 47'; Heer 87' (2:0)	FCZ summary		Attendance: 6,800; Referee: (Switzerland) Paul Uldry (Meyrin)

15 April 1973 Round 19	Zürich	1–1	Lugano	Letzigrund, Zürich
15:00	Jeandupeux 24' (1:1)	FCZ summary	21' (0:1) Luttrop; (yellow card) 89' Lanfranconi	Attendance: 9,000; Referee: (Switzerland) Roland Racine (Prilly)

18 April 1973 Round 17	La Chaux-de-Fonds	1–1	Zürich	Stade Charrière, La Chaux-de-Fonds
20:15	Serment 90' (1:1)	FCZ summary	66' (0:1) Martinelli; (yellow card) Heer	Attendance: 3,000; Referee: (Switzerland) Anton Bucheli (Luzern)

28 April 1973 Round 20	Sion	2–2	Zürich	Stade Tourbillon, Sion
20:15	Elsig 17' (1:2); Barberis 38' (2:2)	FCZ summary	11' (0:1) Kuhn; 17' (0:2) Marti	Attendance: 7,500; Referee: (Switzerland) Bruno della Bruna (Lumino)

2 May 1973 Round 21	Basel	2–1	Zürich	St. Jakob Stadium, Basel
20:00	Balmer 38' (1:0); Odermatt 48' (2:0)	FCZ summary FCB summary	(yellow card) 41' Heer; 76' (2:1) Brunnenmeier	Attendance: 26,000; Referee: (Switzerland) Rudolf Scheurer Bettlach
Note: New floodlight system in operation for the first time (900 lux).

12 May 1973 Round 22	Zürich	0–0	Winterthur	Letzigrund, Zürich
20:15		FCZ summary	(yellow card) 75' Nielsen	Attendance: 8,500; Referee: (Switzerland) Roland Racine (Prilly)

19 May 1973 Round 23	Servette	5–1	Zürich	Charmilles Stadium, Geneva
20:30	Barriquand 7' (1:0); Dutoit 28' (2:0); Pfister 43' (3:1); Pfister 55' (4:1); Pfister 66' (5:1)	FCZ summary	31' (2:1) Martinelli	Attendance: 5,200; Referee: (Switzerland) Ulysse Darbellay (Roche, Vaud)

26 May 1973 Round 24	Zürich	1–2	Fribourg	Letzigrund, Zürich
20:15	Jeandupeux 4' (1:0)	FCZ summary	37' (pen.) Cotting; 55' (1:2) Kvicinsky; (penalty missed) 74′ Cotting	Attendance: 2,500; Referee: (Switzerland) Marcel Despland (Yverdon-les-Bains)

2 June 1973 Round 25	Grenchen	1–4	Zürich	Stadion Brühl, Grenchen
20:15	von Burg 40' (1:0)	FCZ summary	53' (1:1) Jeandupeux; 58' (1:2) Jeandupeux; 78' (1:3) Rutschmann; 90' (pen.) Jeandupeux	Attendance: 2,500; Referee: (Switzerland) André Favre (Échallens)

9 June 1973 Round 26	Zürich	3–1	Grasshopper Club	Letzigrund, Zürich
20:15	Schweizer 8' (1:0); Marti 31' (2:0); Kuhn 80' (3:1)	FCZ summary	45' (2:1) Ohlhauser; (yellow card) Citherlet	Attendance: 13,000; Referee: (Switzerland) Roland Keller (Kehrsatz, Bern)

==== Final league table ====
Pos	Team	Pld	W	D	L	GF	GA	GD	Pts	Qualification
1	Basel	26	17	5	4	57	30	+27	39	Swiss champions, qualified for 1973–74 European Cup
2	Grasshopper Club	26	14	7	5	54	32	+22	35	Qualified for 1973–74 UEFA Cup and entered 1973 Intertoto Cup
3	Sion	26	13	7	6	35	30	+5	33	Qualified for 1973–74 UEFA Cup
4	Servette	26	14	3	9	41	23	+18	31	
5	Winterthur	26	12	6	8	40	29	+11	30	Entered 1973 Intertoto Cup
6	Lausanne-Sport	26	11	6	9	46	27	+19	28	
7	Zürich	26	10	8	8	38	33	+5	28	Swiss Cup winners, qualified for 1973–74 Cup Winners' Cup and entered 1973 Intertoto Cup
8	Lugano	26	9	9	8	31	30	+1	27	Entered 1973 Intertoto Cup
9	Young Boys	26	9	5	12	39	40	−1	23	
10	La Chaux-de-Fonds	26	8	7	11	30	43	−13	23	
11	Chiasso	26	8	5	13	21	48	−27	21	
12	St. Gallen	26	7	5	14	31	49	−18	19	
13	Fribourg	26	4	7	15	24	43	−19	15	Relegated to 1973–74 Nationalliga B
14	Grenchen	26	4	4	18	23	53	−30	12	Relegated to 1973–74 Nationalliga B

Source: rsssf.com

=== Swiss Cup ===
5 November 1972 Round 4	Bellinzona	1–4	Zürich	Stadio Comunale Bellinzona, Bellinzona
	Gobbi 74' (1:3)	FCZ summary	16' (0:1) Marti; 48' (0:2) Marti; 67' (0:3) Stierli; 75' (1:4) Künzli	Attendance: 3,000; Referee: (Switzerland) Hans Wieland (Grenchen)

25 November 1972 Round 5	Zürich	2–1	Lausanne-Sport	Letzigrund, Zürich
	Jeandupeux 19' (1:0); Künzli 60' (2:0)	FCZ summary	88' (2:1) Walter Müller II	Attendance: 7,800; Referee: (Switzerland) Jean Dubach (Nidau)

10 December 1972 Quarter-final first leg	Zürich	1–1	Etoile Carouge	Letzigrund, Zürich
14:30	Münch 15' (1:0)	FCZ summary	74' (1:1) Andrey	Attendance: 2,700; Referee: Rudolf Scheurer (Bettlach, Switzerland)

17 December 1972 Quarter-final return leg	Etoile Carouge	0–4 (1–5 agg.)	Zürich	Stade de la Fontenette, Carouge
14:30		FCZ summary	19' (0:1) Martinelli; 28' (0:2) Kuhn; 37' (0:3) Jeandupeux; (yellow card) 64' Heer; 69' (0:4) Martinelli	Attendance: 8,157; Referee: (Switzerland) Hans Wieland (Grenchen)

25 March 1973 Semi-final first leg	Winterthur	1–1	Zürich	Schützenwiese, Winterthur
14:30	Meili 2' (1:0); Oettli (yellow card) 84'	FCZ summary	63' (1:1) Stierli	Attendance: 12,700; Referee: Rudolf Scheurer (Bettlach, Switzerland)

28 March 1973 Semi-final return leg	Zürich	2–1 (a.e.t.) (3–2 agg.)	Winterthur	Letzigrund, Zürich
19:30	Martinelli 36' (1:1); Rutschmann 100' (2:1)	FCZ summary	33' (0:1) Grünig	Attendance: 15,000; Referee: (Switzerland) Hans Wieland (Grenchen)

23 April 1973 Final	Zürich	2–0 (a.e.t.)	Basel	Wankdorf, Bern
14:30	Münch (yellow card) 22'; Zigerlig (yellow card) 36'; Marti 92'; Künzli 101'; Bionda (yellow card) 104'	FCZ summary FCB summary	(yellow card) 41' Hitzfeld; (yellow card) 99' Demarmels; (yellow card) 104' Odermatt	Attendance: 45,000; Referee: (Switzerland) Roland Keller (Bern
Note: 42,591 paying spectators, 2,500 invited guests.

=== Swiss League Cup ===
5 August 1972 Round of 16	Zürich	0–2	Grasshopper Club	Letzigrund, Zürich
17:30		FCZ summary	37' (pen.) Citherlet; 78' (0:2) Meier	Attendance: 7,600; Referee: (Switzerland) Walter Hungerbühler (St. Gallen)

=== Cup Winners' Cup ===
13 September 1972 Round 1 first leg	Zürich (Switzerland)	1–1	(Wales) Wrexham	Letzigrund, Zürich
20:15	Künzli 47'	FCZ summary	48' Kinsey	Attendance: 6,500; Referee: Petar Kostovski (Yugoslavia)

27 September 1972 Round 1, return leg	Wrexham (Wales)	2–1 (3–2 agg.)	(Switzerland) Zürich	Racecourse Ground, Wrexham
	Ashcroft 63'; Sutton 74'; May (yellow card); Mostyn (yellow card)	FCZ summary	48' Martinelli; (yellow card) Zigerlig	Attendance: 18,000; Referee: Rolf Nyhus (Norway)

Wrexham won 3–2 on aggregate

=== Intertoto Cup ===
==== Group 5 matches ====
24 June 1972 Round 1	Zürich (Switzerland)	0–0	(Sweden) Djurgården	Letzigrund, Zürich
18:00		FCZ summary		Attendance: 1,600; Referee: (Switzerland) Mario Clematide (Zollikofen)

1 July 1972 Round 2	First Vienna (Austria)	2–2	(Switzerland) Zürich	Red Star-Platz, Vienna
	Miss 21' (1:0); Hevera 26' (2:0)	FCZ summary	71' (2:1) Schweizer; 81' (2:2) Schweizer	Attendance: 2,000; Referee: (Austria) Paul Drabek

8 July 1972 Round 3	Slovan Bratislava (Czechoslovakia)	0–3	(Switzerland) Zürich	Tehelné pole, Bratislava
		FCZ summary	2' (0:1) Künzli; 64' (0:2) Künzli; 65' (0:3) Künzli	Attendance: 4,000

15 July 1972 Round 4	Zürich (Switzerland)	1–1	(Austria) First Vienna	Letzigrund, Zürich
	Künzli 45' (1:0)	FCZ summary	66' (1:1) Traxler; (yellow card) Hevera	Attendance: 3,500; Referee: (Switzerland) Jean Dubach (Nidau)

22 July 1972 Round 5	Zürich (Switzerland)	1–3	(Czechoslovakia) Slovan Bratislava	Letzigrund, Zürich
	Künzli 25' (1:0)	FCZ summary	42' (1:1) Pekárik; 45' (1:2) Pekárik; 87' (1:3) Čapkovič	Attendance: 4,100; Referee: (Switzerland) Hans Wieland (Grenchen)

29 July 1972 Round 6	Djurgården (Sweden)	2–1	(Switzerland) Zürich	Stockholm
	Svensson 16' (1:0); Svensson 71' (2:1)	FCZ summary	48' (1:1) Künzli	Attendance: 950; Referee: (Sweden) Sven Jonsson

==== Final group table ====
Pos	Team	Pld	W	D	L	GF	GA	GD	Pts	SLO	FIR	ZÜR	DJU
1	(Czechoslovakia) Slovan Bratislava	6	5	0	1	16	7	+9	10	—	5–0	0–3	4–1
2	(Austria) First Vienna	6	2	2	2	9	10	−1	6	0–1	—	2–2	3–0
3	(Switzerland) Zürich	6	1	3	2	8	8	0	5	1–3	1–1	—	0–0
4	(Sweden) Djurgården	6	1	1	4	6	14	−8	3	2–3	1–3	2–1	—

Source: mogiel.net
Rules for classification: 1) Points; 2) Goal difference; 3) Goals scored; 4) Head-to-head points; 5) Away goals scored; 6) Draw.

=== Friendly matches ===
==== Pre- and Mid-season ====
5 July 1972 Pre-season	Austria national football team (Amateur national team)	0–1	Zürich	Amstetten
		FCZ summary	(0:1) Gnädinger

3 September 1972 Mid-season	Schalke 04	2–2	Zürich	Sports centre Freudenstadt
	Goal	FCZ summary	(0:1) Schweizer (0:2) Künzli	Attendance: 2,500

20 October 1972 Mid-season	Zürich	0–1	Sampdoria	Letzigrund, Zürich
20:15		FCZ summary	70' (0:1) Badiani	Attendance: 1,100; Referee: (Switzerland) Walter Gallmann (Oberrieden)

==== Winter break and Mid-season ====
3 February 1973 Winter break	Biel-Bienne	2–2	Zürich	Gurzelen Stadion, Biel/Bienne
	Wiberg 6' (1:0); Wiberg 46' (2:0)	FCZ summary	57' (2:1) Künzli; (yellow card) 68' Kuhn; 74' (2:2) Martinelli	Attendance: 500; Referee: (Switzerland) Jean Dubach (Nidau)
Note: Corners: 7:11

10 February 1973 Winter break	Zürich	4–2	Basel	Letzigrund, Zürich
14:30	Künzli 66' (1:2); Künzli 79' (2:2); Martinelli 83' (3:2); Marti 90' (4:2)	FCZ summary FCB summary	39' (0:1) Hitzfeld; 65' (0:2) Stohler	Attendance: 1,300; Referee: (Switzerland) Rudolf Scheurer Bettlach
Note: Half an hour before the game, a snowstorm: slippery, uneven surface.

18 February 1973 Winter break	Wettingen	0–5	Zürich	Stadion Altenburg, Wettingen
		FCZ summary	68' (0:1) Brunnenmeier; 70' (0:2) Künzli; 78' (0:3) Künzli; 80' (0:4) Kuhn; 85' (0:5) Brunnenmeier	Attendance: 700; Referee: (Switzerland) Hans Wieland (Grenchen)

25 February 1973 Winter break	Lausanne-Sport	1–0	Zürich	Olympique de la Pontaise, Lausanne
	Grahn 15' (1:0)	FCZ summary		Attendance: 1,000; Referee: (Switzerland) André Favre (Échallens)
Note: Snow-covered pitch

18 March 1973 Mid-season	AS Gambarogno	0–12	Zürich	Campo Quartino, Gambarogno
		FCZ summary	4' (0:1) Brunnenmeier; 6' (pen.) Kuhn; 29' (0:3) Künzli; 34' (0:4) Rutschmann; 36' (0:5) Künzli; 39' (0:6) Rutschmann; 43' (0:7) Kuhn; 47' (0:8) Martinelli; 64' (0:9) Kuhn; 72' (0:10) Brunnenmeier; 75' (0:11) Künzli; 84' (0:12) Marti	Attendance: 320; Referee: (Switzerland) Prudente (Bellinzona)
Note: Corners 1:8. Gambarogno spielte in der Saison 1972/73 in der 1. Liga.

7 April 1973 Mid-season	Luzern	2–2	Zürich	Stadion Allmend, Luzern
	Schaller 58' (1:1); Küttel 73' (2:1)	FCZ summary	50' (0:1) Brunnenmeier; 80' (2:2) Brunnenmeier	Attendance: 200; Referee: (Switzerland) Gottlieb Barmettler, (Oberrieden and Luzern)

29 May 1973 Mid-season	TSV 1860 München	3–0	Zürich	Munich
	Weller (1:0); Schuberth (2:0); Brozulat (3:0)	FCZ summary

== Sources and references ==
- Switzerland 1972–73 at RSSSF
- Swiss League Cup 1972 at RSSSF

Preceded by 1971–72	FC Zürich seasons	Succeeded by 1973–74
