= 1973–74 Swiss Cup =

Tournament details
- Country: Switzerland

Final positions
- Champions: Sion
- Runners-up: Xamax

The 1973–74 Swiss Cup was the 49th season of Switzerland's football cup competition, organised annually since 1925–1926 by the Swiss Football Association.

== Overview ==
This season's cup competition began on the weekend of 11 and 12 August 1973, with the first games of the first round. The competition was to be completed on Easter Monday 15 April 1974 with the final, which was held at the former Wankdorf Stadium in Bern. The clubs from this season's Nationalliga B (NLB) were granted byes for the first round. These entered the competition for the second round, played on the weekend of 24 to 26 of August. The clubs from this season's Nationalliga A (NLA) were granted byes for the first three rounds. These teams joined the competition in the fourth round, which was played on the week-end of 22 and 23 September.

The matches were played in a knockout format. In the first two rounds, in the event of a draw at the end of extra time, the match was decided with a penalty shoot-out. This was the first season that penalty shoot-outs were introduced to this competition and this would replace the toss of a coin. In and after the third-round, in the event of a draw at the end of extra time, a replay was foreseen and this was played on the visiting team's pitch. The quarter- and semi-finals were played as two legged fixtures. The final was again played in one match. The winners of the cup qualified themselves for the first round of the Cup Winners' Cup in the next season.

== Round 1 ==
In this first phase, the lower league teams (1. Liga and lower) that had qualified themselves for the competition through their regional football association's cup competitions or their requirements, competed here.

=== Summary ===
Team 1	Score	Team 2
11 August 1973
FC Saint-Prex	2–1	Stade Nyonnais
Signal FC (Bernex)	1–1 (a.e.t.) (p)	Urania Genève Sport
FC Collex-Bossy	4–0	PTT Lausanne
FC Moudon	0–3	Meyrin
CS Interstar GE	1–4	Yverdon-Sport
FC Orbe	3–4	FC Assens
FC Vernayaz	4–1 (a.e.t.)	FC Chalais
Folgore Lausanne	5–1	FC Sierre
FC Salgesch	0–3 (a.e.t.)	Monthey
Montreux-Sports	1–0	FC Raron
FC Saint-Maurice	4–1	CS La Tour-de-Peilz
FC Fétigny	2–4 (a.e.t.)	Central Fribourg
FC Portalban	3–5 (a.e.t.)	Rot-Weiss Bümpliz
Arconciel	1–5	Bulle
FC Beauregard Fribourg	4–0	FC Courtepin
FC Courrendlin	0–4	FC Porrentruy
FC Breitenbach	2–2 (a.e.t.) (11–12 p)	ASI Audax Neuchâtel
Béroche St-Aubain	0–2	Le Locle-Sports
FC Breite Basel	1–5 (a.e.t.)	Concordia
FC Binningen	5–1	FC Reconvilier
SC Kleihünungen	3–4 (a.e.t.)	Delémont
Aegerten-Brügg	2–3	Moutier
FC Liestal	0–5	Laufen
Muttenz	2–0	FC Fleurier
US Boncourt	0–0 (a.e.t.) (p)	FC Superga (La Chaux-de-Fonds)
FC Frutigen	2–3	Bern
Burgdorf	2–1	Thun
FC Herzogenbuchsee	1–2	Dürrenast
FC Lerchenfeld (Thun)	3–4	FC Langenthal
FC Olten	1–4	Solothurn
SC Derendingen	2–1	FC Brugg
SC Schöftland	2–0	FC Deitingen
Blustavia SO	1–3	Köniz
Reinach AG	1–6	Baden
FC Altstetten (Zürich)	4–2	FC Menziken
SV Seebach ZH	3–3 (a.e.t.) (5–4 p)	Red Star
FC Horgen	0–4	Kriens
FC Villmergen	1–0	FC Neuhausen
FC Beringen	2–5	Schaffhausen
FC Kilchberg	1–3	FC Adliswil
FC Bülach	1–2	Blue Stars
FC Steinhausen	2–7	FC Brunnen
Unterstrass ZH	2–3	Emmenbrücke
FC Perlen	3–6	Buochs
Balerna	2–4	Locarno
FC Ponte Tresa	1–0	FC Rapid Lugano
FC Altdorf (Uri)	2–4	SC Zug
Losone Sportiva	1–1 (a.e.t.) (p)	FC Bodio
FC Schwyz	2–4	US Giubiasco
Juventus Zürich	5–4	FC Sursee
Arbon	0–4	Gossau
FC Rüti ZH	4–1	Weinfelden-Bürglen
Töss Winterthur	2–3 (a.e.t.)	Chur
FC Münchwilen	0–7	Frauenfeld
FC Schmerikon	1–8	Brühl
FC Altstätten (St. Gallen)	1–4	FC Widnau
FC Staad	F–F *	FC Uzwil

- Staad–Uzwil not played: no referee; Forfait: awd 0-3

== Round 2 ==
The teams from the NLB entered the cup competition in this round with the teams from the lower divisions. However, they were seeded and could not be drawn against each other. Whenever possible, the draw respected local regionalities. The lower-tier team in each drawn tie was granted the home advantage.

=== Summary ===
Team 1	Score	Team 2
24 August 1973
Urania Genève Sport	A–A *	Vevey Sports
25 August 1973
Monthey	1–2 (a.e.t.)	Martigny-Sports
FC Porrentruy	1–4	Biel-Bienne
Burgdorf	0–7	Aarau
FC Brunnen	1–5	Luzern
Concordia	1–3	Le Locle-Sports
26 August 1973
FC Assens	0–2 (a.e.t.)	Fribourg
FC Collex-Bossy	2–5	Etoile Carouge
US Boncourt	3–5 (a.e.t.)	Nordstern
Solothurn	3–3 (a.e.t.) (2–3 p)	Grenchen
FC Rebstein	2–3	FC Tössfeld
FC Altstetten (Zürich)	0–4	Young Fellows
SC Schöftland	0–3	Wettingen
Locarno	3–0	Bellinzona
Buochs	2–3 (a.e.t.)	US Giubiasco
SC Zug	1–0	Kriens
FC Ponte Tresa	0–1	Losone Sportiva
ASI Audax Neuchâtel	3–1	Moutier
Emmenbrücke	1–2	Mendrisiostar
FC Beauregard Fribourg	5–6 (a.e.t.)	Bulle
FC Saint-Prex	0–1	Yverdon-Sport
FC Binningen	1–0	Muttenz
Frauenfeld	3–2	Brühl
Central Fribourg	3–2	Meyrin
Rot-Weiss Bümpliz	1–3	Bern
Blue Stars	3–1	Schaffhausen
FC Adliswil	2–4	Juventus Zürich
FC Villmergen	3–2	FC Langenthal
FC Rüti ZH	1–4	Gossau
SV Seebach ZH	3–0	Chur
Montreux-Sports	3–1 (a.e.t.)	Folgore Lausanne
FC Saint-Maurice	0–1	FC Vernayaz
Baden	3–0	Dürrenast
Delémont	2–1 (a.e.t.)	Laufen
FC Widnau	3–1	FC Uzwil
SC Derendingen	F–F *	Köniz

- A–A: The match Urania Genève–Vevey Sports was abandoned at half-time due to rain and was replayed.
- F–F: The match Derendingen–Köniz ended in a goalless draw after extra time and Derendingen won 9–8 on penalties. But because the player Hofer of Derendingen was not qualified to play the result was annulled and awarded with a 0–3 forfeit.

Replay

Team 1	Score	Team 2
5 September 1973
Urania Genève Sport	1–3	Vevey Sports

=== Matches ===
25 August 1973

Burgdorf	0–7	Aarau
	FCA summary	Goal

Stadion Neumatt, Burgdorf

== Round 3 ==
From this round onwards, in the event of a draw at the end of extra time, a replay was foreseen and this was played on the visiting team's pitch.

=== Summary ===
Team 1	Score	Team 2
8 September 1973
Biel-Bienne	2–0	Grenchen
Central Fribourg	4–2	Bern
Luzern	1–1 (a.e.t.)	Blue Stars
FC Villmergen	2–4 (a.e.t.)	Aarau
FC Tössfeld	2–1	Young Fellows
Fribourg	2–3	Vevey Sports
SC Zug	1–0	US Giubiasco
Nordstern	2–1	Le Locle-Sports
9 September 1973
Martigny-Sports	3–1	Etoile Carouge
Montreux-Sports	5–1	FC Vernayaz
Bulle	4–3 (a.e.t.)	Yverdon-Sport
Audax Neuchâtel	2–1	Delémont
FC Binningen	2–3	Köniz
Losone Sportiva	3–2	Baden
Mendrisiostar	4–0	Locarno
FC Widnau	2–5	Juventus Zürich
Frauenfeld	3–2	Wettingen
Gossau	4–2	SV Seebach ZH

Replay

Team 1	Score	Team 2
12 September 1976
Blue Stars	1–6	Luzern

=== Matches ===
8 September 1973

FC Villmergen	2–4 (a.e.t.)	Aarau
Goal	FCA summary	Goal

Badmatte. Villmergen

== Round 4 ==
The teams from the NLA entered the cup competition in the fourth round, they were seeded and could not be drawn against each other. The draw was still respecting regionalities and the lower-tier team was again granted the home advantage.

=== Summary ===
Team 1	Score	Team 2
22 September 1973
Bulle	1–4	Sion
Köniz	0–2	Servette
Biel-Bienne	1–2	Basel
Central Fribourg	2–5	Lausanne-Sport
Luzern	2–1	Young Boys
Juventus Zürich	1–5	Zürich
Aarau	1–2	St. Gallen
Martigny-Sports	0–6	Xamax
Gossau	0–1	Chiasso
FC Tössfeld	2–3	Winterthur
Losone Sportiva	0–2	Grasshopper Club
Audax Neuchâtel	1–8	Vevey Sports
SC Zug	3–7	Lugano
Nordstern	1–3	La Chaux-de-Fonds
23 September 1973
Frauenfeld	1–2	Mendrisiostar
Montreux-Sports	0–3	Chênois

=== Matches ===
22 September 1973

Köniz	0–2	Servette
	Servette summary	(0:1) Riner (0:2) Wegmann

Sportplatz Liebefeld-Hessgut, Köniz

22 September 1973
20:15

Biel-Bienne	1–2	Basel
Peters 30' (1:0)	FCB summary	31' (1:1) Hitzfeld; 46' (1:2) Demarmels

Gurzelen Stadion, Biel/Bienne
Attendance: 7,300
Referee: (Switzerland) Fernand Burioli Lausanne

22 September 1973

Luzern	2–1	Young Boys
Schaller 59' (1:1); Milder 80' (pen.)	YB summary	35' (0:1) Cornioley

Stadion Allmend, Lucerne
Attendance: 5,370
Referee: (Switzerland) Bruno Della Bruna (Lumino)

22 September 1973

Juventus Zürich	1–5	Zürich
Kappeler 68' (1:3)	FCZ summary	19' (0:1) Marti; 21' (0:2) Katić; 32' (0:3) Stierli; 73' (1:4) Katić; 77' (1:5) Iselin

Mülligen, Zürich
Attendance: 2,400
Referee: (Switzerland) Hans Wieland (Grenchen)

22 September 1973

Aarau	1–2	St. Gallen
Goal	FCA summary	Goal

Stadion Brügglifeld, Aarau

== Round 5 ==
=== Summary ===
Team 1	Score	Team 2
6 October 1973
Grasshopper Club	3–1 (a.e.t.)	Vevey Sports
Xamax	2–0	Chiasso
Chênois	2–1	Winterthur
Lugano	1–1 (a.e.t.)	La Chaux-de-Fonds
7 October 1973
Sion	3–0	Servette
Mendrisiostar	1–4	Basel
Lausanne-Sport	4–0	Luzern
Zürich	2–3	St. Gallen

Replay

Team 1	Score	Team 2
10 October 1973
La Chaux-de-Fonds	0–1	Lugano

=== Matches ===
7 October 1973

Sion	3–0	Servette
Goal	Servette summary

Stade de Tourbillon, Sion

7 October 1973
14:45

Mendrisiostar	1–4	Basel
Bianchi (1:4)	FCB summary	9' (0:1) Stohler; 41' (0:2) Paolucci; 62' (0:3) Cubillas; 75' (0:4) Cubillas

Centro Sportivo Comunale, Mendrisio
Attendance: 3,000
Referee: (Switzerland) Roland Keller (Bern)

7 October 1973

Zürich	2–3	St. Gallen
Stierli 14' (1:0); Jeandupeux 19' (2:0); Bionda (yellow card)	FCZ summary	47' (2:1) Leuzinger; 55' (2:2) Blättler; 72' (2:3) Blättler; (yellow card) Blättler; (yellow card) Nasdalla

Letzigrund, Zürich
Attendance: 7,600
Referee: (Switzerland) René Matthieu (Sierre)

== Quarter-finals ==
=== Summary ===
The first legs were played on and the return legs were played on

Team 1	Agg.	Team 2	1st leg	2nd leg
Sion	3–2	Basel	1–0	2–2
Lausanne-Sport	4–3	St. Gallen	3–1	1–2
Xamax	7–1	Chênois	5–1	2–0
Grasshopper Club	2–2 (a)	Lugano	1–0	1–2

Grasshopper Club won on the away goals rule.

=== Matches ===
31 October 1973
First leg

Sion	1–0	Basel
Lopez 57' (1:0)	FCB summary

Stade Tourbillon, Sion
Attendance: 6,000
Referee: (Switzerland) Gérard Racine (Biel/Bienne)

4 November 1973
18:00
Second leg

Basel	2–2	Sion
Hitzfeld 4' (1:0); Hasler 66' (2:0)	FCB summary	84' (2:1) Vergères; 90' (2:2) Lopez

St. Jakob Stadium, Basel
Attendance: 8,000
Referee: (Switzerland) Jean Dubach (Nidau)
- Sion won 3–2 on aggregate

== Semi-finals ==
=== Summary ===
The first legs were played on and the return legs were played on

Team 1	Agg.	Team 2	1st leg	2nd leg
Sion	1–1 (a)	Lausanne-Sport	0–0	1–1
Xamax	1–1 (a)	Grasshopper Club	0–0	1–1

=== Matches ===
23 March 1974
First leg

Sion	0–0	Lausanne-Sport

Stade de Tourbillon, Sion

26 March 1974
Second leg

Lausanne-Sport	1–1	Sion
Müller 28' (1:0)		44' (1:1) Pillet

Pontaise, Lausanne
- Sion won on the away goals rule.

23 March 1974
First leg

Xamax	0–0	Grasshopper Club

Stade de la Maladière, Neuchâtel

26 March 1974
Second leg

Grasshopper Club	1–1	Xamax
Elsener 60' (1:1)		49' (pen.) Elsig

- Xamax won on the away goals rule.

== Final ==
The final was held at the former Wankdorf Stadium in Bern on Easter Monday 1974.

=== Summary ===
Team 1	Score	Team 2
15 April 1974
Sion	3–2	Xamax

=== Telegram ===
15 April 1974
15:00

Sion	3–2	Xamax
Luttrop 7' (pen.); Barberis 14' (2:0); Pillet 43' (3:0)	Fussball-Schweiz summary	84' (3:1) Elsig; 87' (3:2) Mathez

Wankdorf Stadium, Bern
Attendance: 30,000
Referee: (Switzerland) Hans Wieland (Grenchen)

Sion won the cup and this was the club's second cup title to this date.

== Further in Swiss football ==
- 1973–74 Nationalliga A
- 1973–74 Swiss 1. Liga

== Sources ==
- Fussball-Schweiz
- FCB Cup games 1973–74 at fcb-achiv.ch
- Switzerland 1973–74 at RSSSF

Preceded by 1972–73	Swiss Cup seasons	Succeeded by 1974–75
