= 1973 Intertoto Cup =

European football tournament

Tournament details
- Teams: 40

Final positions
- Champions: Group winners Hannover; Slovan Bratislava; Hertha Berlin; Zürich; Rybnik; Union Teplice; Feyenoord; Wisła Kraków; Nitra; Öster

Tournament statistics
- Matches played: 120

In the 1973 Intertoto Cup no knock-out rounds were contested, and therefore no winner was declared.

== Group stage ==
The teams were divided into ten groups of four teams each.

=== Group 1 ===
| Pos | Team | Pld | W | D | L | GF | GA | GD | Pts | HAN | ADO | ÅTV | WIN |
|---|---|---|---|---|---|---|---|---|---|---|---|---|---|
| 1 | (West Germany) Hannover | 6 | 5 | 0 | 1 | 9 | 4 | +5 | 10 | — | 2–1 | 1–0 | 3–0 |
| 2 | (Netherlands) Den Haag | 6 | 2 | 2 | 2 | 8 | 7 | +1 | 6 | 0–1 | — | 3–2 | 2–0 |
| 3 | (Sweden) Åtvidaberg | 6 | 1 | 2 | 3 | 8 | 9 | −1 | 4 | 2–0 | 1–1 | — | 1–1 |
| 4 | (Switzerland) Winterthur | 6 | 1 | 2 | 3 | 6 | 11 | −5 | 4 | 1–2 | 1–1 | 3–2 | — |

Source: mogiel.net
Rules for classification: 1) Points; 2) Goal difference; 3) Goals scored; 4) Head-to-head points; 5) Away goals scored; 6) Draw.

=== Group 2 ===
| Pos | Team | Pld | W | D | L | GF | GA | GD | Pts | SLO | PSV | AIK | DUI |
|---|---|---|---|---|---|---|---|---|---|---|---|---|---|
| 1 | (Czechoslovakia) Slovan Bratislava | 6 | 4 | 2 | 0 | 6 | 1 | +5 | 10 | — | 1–0 | 0–0 | 1–0 |
| 2 | (Netherlands) PSV | 6 | 3 | 0 | 3 | 12 | 5 | +7 | 6 | 0–1 | — | 3–0 | 7–1 |
| 3 | (Sweden) AIK | 6 | 1 | 3 | 2 | 5 | 7 | −2 | 5 | 1–1 | 0–1 | — | 3–1 |
| 4 | (West Germany) Duisburg | 6 | 1 | 1 | 4 | 5 | 15 | −10 | 3 | 0–2 | 2–1 | 1–1 | — |

Source: mogiel.net
Rules for classification: 1) Points; 2) Goal difference; 3) Goals scored; 4) Head-to-head points; 5) Away goals scored; 6) Draw.

=== Group 3 ===
| Pos | Team | Pld | W | D | L | GF | GA | GD | Pts | HER | CUF | MAL | GRA |
|---|---|---|---|---|---|---|---|---|---|---|---|---|---|
| 1 | (West Germany) Hertha Berlin | 6 | 4 | 2 | 0 | 12 | 6 | +6 | 10 | — | 1–0 | 1–1 | 3–1 |
| 2 | (Portugal) CUF | 6 | 3 | 1 | 2 | 10 | 4 | +6 | 7 | 0–0 | — | 4–0 | 2–1 |
| 3 | (Sweden) Malmö FF | 6 | 3 | 1 | 2 | 8 | 9 | −1 | 7 | 2–4 | 1–0 | — | 3–0 |
| 4 | (Switzerland) Grasshopper Club | 6 | 0 | 0 | 6 | 5 | 16 | −11 | 0 | 2–3 | 1–4 | 0–1 | — |

Source: mogiel.net
Rules for classification: 1) Points; 2) Goal difference; 3) Goals scored; 4) Head-to-head points; 5) Away goals scored; 6) Draw.

=== Group 4 ===
| Pos | Team | Pld | W | D | L | GF | GA | GD | Pts | ZÜR | SLA | NAN | NOR |
|---|---|---|---|---|---|---|---|---|---|---|---|---|---|
| 1 | (Switzerland) Zürich | 6 | 3 | 2 | 1 | 15 | 9 | +6 | 8 | — | 3–0 | 4–1 | 4–4 |
| 2 | (Czechoslovakia) Slavia Prague | 6 | 3 | 1 | 2 | 9 | 7 | +2 | 7 | 2–1 | — | 2–1 | 4–0 |
| 3 | (France) Nancy | 6 | 2 | 1 | 3 | 7 | 13 | −6 | 5 | 1–1 | 1–0 | — | 2–1 |
| 4 | (Sweden) Norrköping | 6 | 1 | 2 | 3 | 12 | 14 | −2 | 4 | 1–2 | 1–1 | 5–1 | — |

Source: mogiel.net
Rules for classification: 1) Points; 2) Goal difference; 3) Goals scored; 4) Head-to-head points; 5) Away goals scored; 6) Draw.

7 July 1973
Round 1

| Slavia Prague (Czechoslovakia) | 2–1 | (Switzerland) Zürich |
|---|---|---|
| Barták 70' (1:1); Veselý 85' (2:1) | FCZ summary | 46' (0:1) Martinelli |

Prague
Attendance: 4,500
Referee: (Czechoslovakia) Zdeněk Jelínek

14 July 1973
18:30
Round 2

| Zürich (Switzerland) | 4–4 | (Sweden) Norrköping |
|---|---|---|
| Martinelli 3' (1:0); Marti 6' (2:0); Martinelli 21' (3:0); Rutschmann 61' (4:1) | FCZ summary | 50' (3:1) Stern; 77' (4:2) Wendt; 83' (4:3) Hult; 84' (4:4) Danielsson |

Letzigrund, Zürich
Attendance: 7,500
Referee: (Switzerland) André Favre (Echallens)

21 July 1973
Round 3

| Zürich (Switzerland) | 3–0 | (Czechoslovakia) Slavia Prague |
|---|---|---|
| Kuhn 66' (1:0); Botteron 70' (2:0); Jeandupeux 79' (3:0) | FCZ summary |

Letzigrund, Zürich
Attendance: 2,800
Referee: (Switzerland) Bruno della Bruna

28 July 1973
Round 4

| Norrköping (Sweden) | 1–2 | (Switzerland) Zürich |
|---|---|---|
| Kindvall 53' (1:1) | FCZ summary | 15' (0:1) Botteron; 60' (1:2) Martinelli |

Norrköping
Attendance: 3,000

1 August 1973
Round 5

| Zürich (Switzerland) | 4–1 | (France) Nancy |
|---|---|---|
| Jeandupeux 8' (1:0); Martinelli 27' (2:0); Martinelli 30' (3:0); Stierli 58' (4:1) | FCZ summary | 40' (3:1) Prost; (yellow card) Bauda; (yellow card) Vicq |

Letzigrund, Zürich
Attendance: 5,500
Referee: (Switzerland) Roland Racine (Prilly)

5 August 1973
Round 6

| Nancy (France) | 1–1 | (Switzerland) Zürich |
|---|---|---|
| Herbet 32' (1:0) | FCZ summary | 78' (1:1) Jeandupeux |

Stade Marcel Picot, Tomblaine, France
Attendance: 6,000

=== Group 5 ===
| Pos | Team | Pld | W | D | L | GF | GA | GD | Pts | RYB | LNZ | ÖRE | LUG |
|---|---|---|---|---|---|---|---|---|---|---|---|---|---|
| 1 | (Poland) Rybnik | 6 | 4 | 1 | 1 | 16 | 6 | +10 | 9 | — | 3–1 | 3–1 | 3–0 |
| 2 | (Austria) VÖEST Linz | 6 | 3 | 1 | 2 | 12 | 11 | +1 | 7 | 2–2 | — | 2–1 | 4–1 |
| 3 | (Sweden) Örebro | 6 | 3 | 0 | 3 | 13 | 10 | +3 | 6 | 2–1 | 4–1 | — | 0–1 |
| 4 | (Switzerland) Lugano | 6 | 1 | 0 | 5 | 4 | 18 | −14 | 2 | 0–4 | 0–2 | 2–5 | — |

Source: mogiel.net
Rules for classification: 1) Points; 2) Goal difference; 3) Goals scored; 4) Head-to-head points; 5) Away goals scored; 6) Draw.

=== Group 6 ===
| Pos | Team | Pld | W | D | L | GF | GA | GD | Pts | TEP | KLA | DJU | NÆS |
|---|---|---|---|---|---|---|---|---|---|---|---|---|---|
| 1 | (Czechoslovakia) Union Teplice | 6 | 4 | 1 | 1 | 15 | 9 | +6 | 9 | — | 4–2 | 1–1 | 1–0 |
| 2 | Austria Klagenfurt | 6 | 3 | 0 | 3 | 9 | 9 | 0 | 6 | 0–1 | — | 2–0 | 2–1 |
| 3 | (Sweden) Djurgården | 6 | 2 | 2 | 2 | 6 | 10 | −4 | 6 | 1–6 | 2–0 | — | 1–1 |
| 4 | (Denmark) Næstved | 6 | 1 | 1 | 4 | 8 | 10 | −2 | 3 | 5–2 | 1–3 | 0–1 | — |

Source: mogiel.net
Rules for classification: 1) Points; 2) Goal difference; 3) Goals scored; 4) Head-to-head points; 5) Away goals scored; 6) Draw.

=== Group 7 ===
| Pos | Team | Pld | W | D | L | GF | GA | GD | Pts | FEY | STA | STE | S04 |
|---|---|---|---|---|---|---|---|---|---|---|---|---|---|
| 1 | (Netherlands) Feyenoord | 6 | 4 | 2 | 0 | 15 | 10 | +5 | 10 | — | 3–1 | 3–2 | 4–3 |
| 2 | (Belgium) Standard Liège | 6 | 3 | 2 | 1 | 13 | 9 | +4 | 8 | 1–1 | — | 3–0 | 3–1 |
| 3 | (France) Saint-Étienne | 6 | 2 | 2 | 2 | 12 | 12 | 0 | 6 | 2–2 | 3–3 | — | 2–0 |
| 4 | (West Germany) Schalke 04 | 6 | 0 | 0 | 6 | 7 | 16 | −9 | 0 | 1–2 | 1–2 | 1–3 | — |

Source: mogiel.net
Rules for classification: 1) Points; 2) Goal difference; 3) Goals scored; 4) Head-to-head points; 5) Away goals scored; 6) Draw.

=== Group 8 ===
| Pos | Team | Pld | W | D | L | GF | GA | GD | Pts | WIS | WAC | B03 | KIC |
|---|---|---|---|---|---|---|---|---|---|---|---|---|---|
| 1 | (Poland) Wisła Kraków | 6 | 3 | 2 | 1 | 12 | 8 | +4 | 8 | — | 3–2 | 3–3 | 1–1 |
| 2 | (Austria) SSW Innsbruck | 6 | 3 | 0 | 3 | 14 | 13 | +1 | 6 | 1–0 | — | 3–0 | 2–4 |
| 3 | (Denmark) B 1903 | 6 | 2 | 2 | 2 | 13 | 15 | −2 | 6 | 1–3 | 4–2 | — | 2–1 |
| 4 | (West Germany) Kickers Offenbach | 6 | 1 | 2 | 3 | 11 | 14 | −3 | 4 | 0–2 | 2–4 | 3–3 | — |

Source: mogiel.net
Rules for classification: 1) Points; 2) Goal difference; 3) Goals scored; 4) Head-to-head points; 5) Away goals scored; 6) Draw.

=== Group 9 ===
| Pos | Team | Pld | W | D | L | GF | GA | GD | Pts | NIT | AMS | EIN | VEJ |
|---|---|---|---|---|---|---|---|---|---|---|---|---|---|
| 1 | (Czechoslovakia) Nitra | 6 | 5 | 1 | 0 | 18 | 6 | +12 | 11 | — | 4–1 | 1–1 | 4–1 |
| 2 | (Netherlands) Amsterdam | 6 | 2 | 1 | 3 | 13 | 14 | −1 | 5 | 2–3 | — | 0–0 | 5–1 |
| 3 | (West Germany) Eintracht Braunschweig | 6 | 1 | 2 | 3 | 5 | 10 | −5 | 4 | 1–2 | 1–4 | — | 0–2 |
| 4 | (Denmark) Vejle | 6 | 2 | 0 | 4 | 10 | 16 | −6 | 4 | 0–4 | 5–1 | 0–2 | — |

Source: mogiel.net
Rules for classification: 1) Points; 2) Goal difference; 3) Goals scored; 4) Head-to-head points; 5) Away goals scored; 6) Draw.

=== Group 10 ===
| Pos | Team | Pld | W | D | L | GF | GA | GD | Pts | ÖST | SAL | BYT | B01 |
|---|---|---|---|---|---|---|---|---|---|---|---|---|---|
| 1 | (Sweden) Öster | 6 | 5 | 1 | 0 | 16 | 4 | +12 | 11 | — | 1–1 | 3–2 | 1–0 |
| 2 | Austria Salzburg | 6 | 3 | 1 | 2 | 16 | 11 | +5 | 7 | 0–2 | — | 7–1 | 2–1 |
| 3 | (Poland) Polonia Bytom | 6 | 3 | 0 | 3 | 16 | 15 | +1 | 6 | 1–2 | 4–1 | — | 6–2 |
| 4 | (Denmark) B 1901 | 6 | 0 | 0 | 6 | 5 | 23 | −18 | 0 | 0–7 | 2–5 | 0–2 | — |

Source: mogiel.net
Rules for classification: 1) Points; 2) Goal difference; 3) Goals scored; 4) Head-to-head points; 5) Away goals scored; 6) Draw.

== See also ==
- 1973–74 European Cup
- 1973–74 UEFA Cup Winners' Cup
- 1973–74 UEFA Cup
