= Lütschental railway station =

Railway station in Switzerland

Lütschental
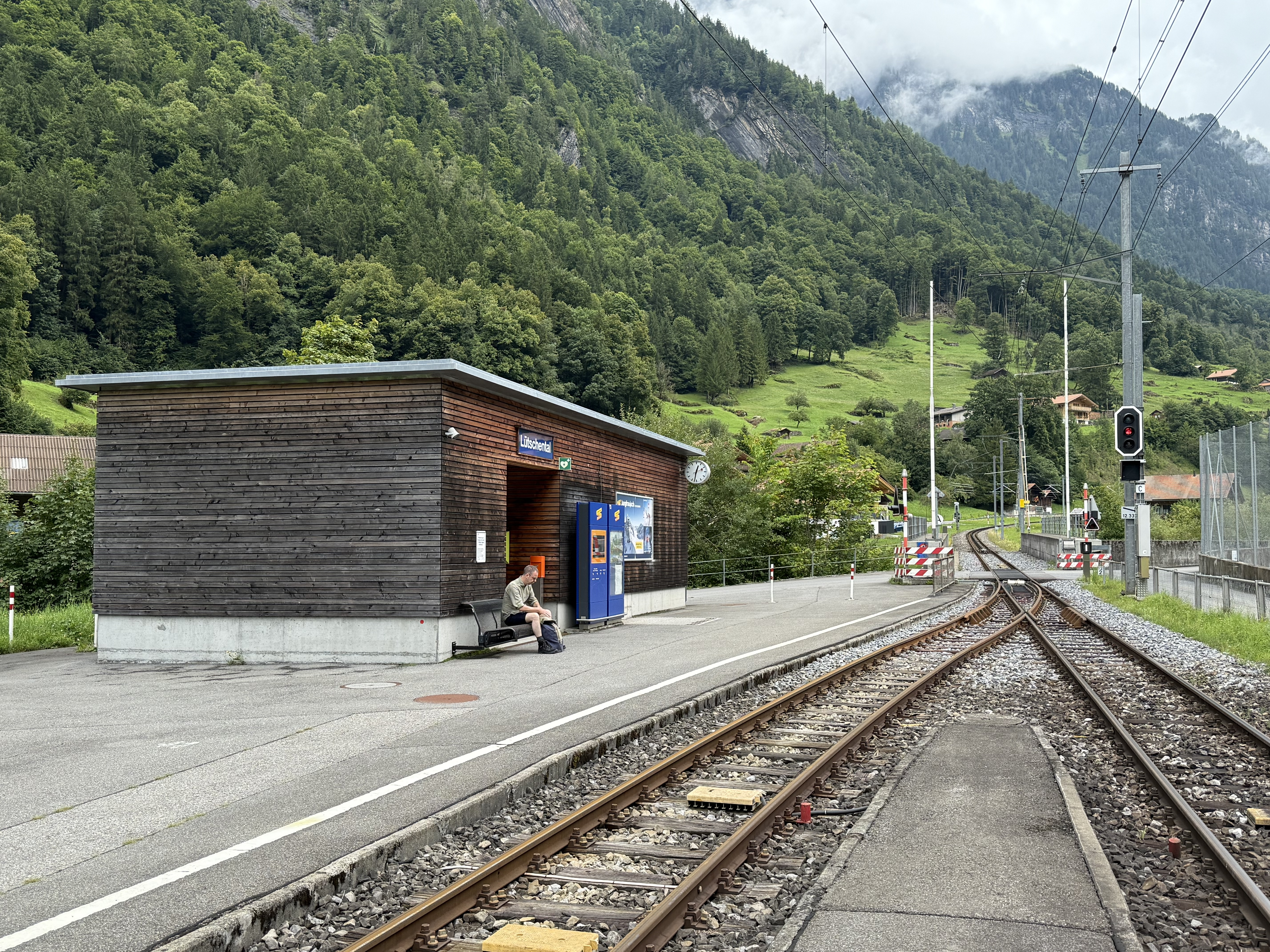
- The station platform in 2025

General information
- Location: 3816 Lütschental, Switzerland; Lütschental, Bern; Switzerland
- Coordinates: 46°38′14″N 7°56′56″E
- Elevation: 713 m (2,339 ft)
- Owner: Berner Oberland-Bahnen
- Operator: Jungfraubahn AG
- Line: Bernese Oberland line
- Distance: 12.3 km (7.6 mi) from Interlaken Ost
- Platforms: 1
- Train operators: Berner Oberland-Bahnen

Construction
- Parking: Yes - 35 spaces

Other information
- Fare zone: 820 (Libero)

History
- Opened: 1 July 1890
- Electrified: 17 March 1914

Services
Preceding station	Berner Oberland-Bahnen AG	Following station
Zweilütschinen towards Interlaken Ost	Bernese Oberland Railway	Burglauenen towards Grindelwald
Location

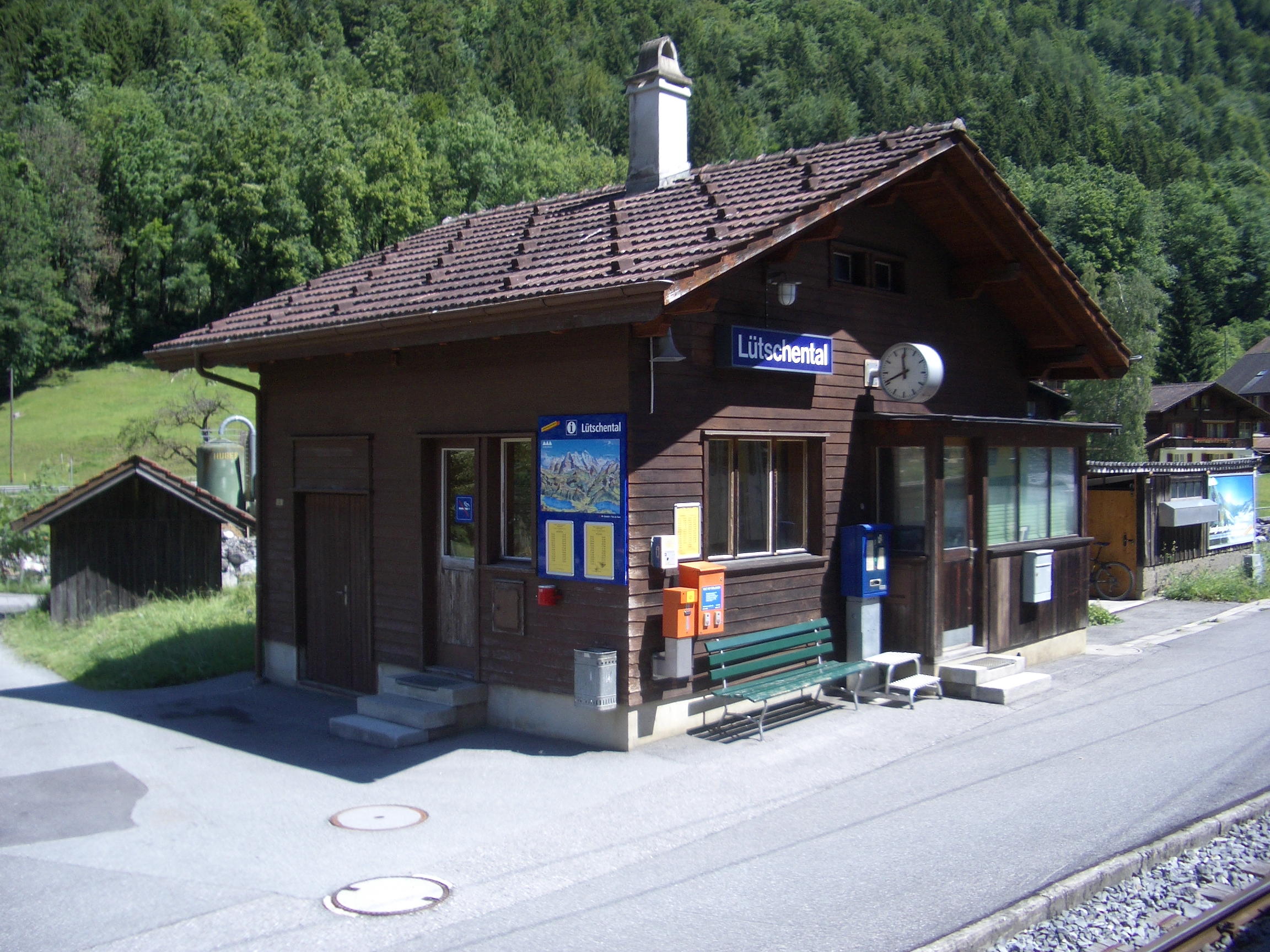
Old station building

Lütschental railway station (German: Bahnhof Lütschental) is a railway station in the village and municipality of Lutschental in the Swiss canton of Bern. The station is on the Berner Oberland Bahn, whose trains operate services to Interlaken Ost and Grindelwald.

== Services ==
As of the December 2020 timetable change, the following rail services stop at Lütschental:

- Regio: half-hourly service between Interlaken Ost and Grindelwald.

== Lütschental power station ==
Jungfraubahn AG run a hydro-electric power station at Lütschental that supplies the Jungfrau Railway, Schynige Platte Railway, Berner Oberland Railway, Wengernalp Railway and Mountain Railway Lauterbrunnen-Mürren as well as the municipalities Lütschental, Gündlischwand, Zweilütschinen and Burglauenenen with electricity.
