= Lütschental =

- Municipality
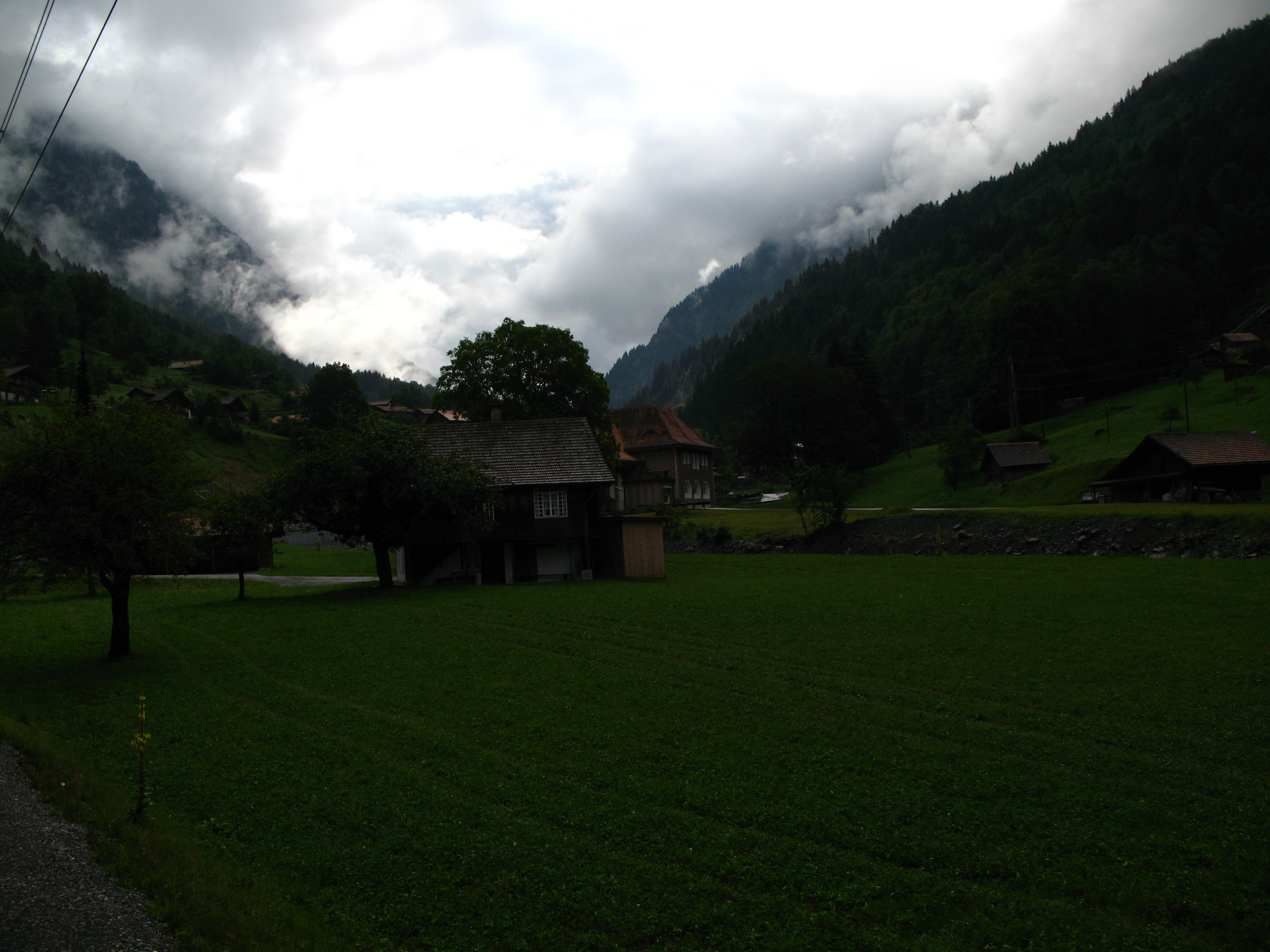
- The river Schwarze Lütschine in the village Lütschental

- Flag Coat of arms
- Location of Lütschental
- Location within Switzerland Location within Canton of Bern
- Coordinates: 46°38′N 7°57′E
- Country: Switzerland
- Canton: Bern
- District: Interlaken-Oberhasli

Government
  - Executive: Gemeinderat with 5 members
  - Mayor: Gemeindepräsident(in); Hansruedi Burgener (as of 2026)

Area
  - Total: 12.4 km^{2} (4.8 sq mi)
- Elevation: 714 m (2,343 ft)

Population (December 2020)
  - Total: 214
  - Density: 17.3/km^{2} (44.7/sq mi)
- Time zone: UTC+01:00 (CET)
  - Summer (DST): UTC+02:00 (CEST)
- Postal code: 3816
- SFOS number: 586
- ISO 3166 code: CH-BE
- Surrounded by: Grindelwald, Gündlischwand, Iseltwald, Lauterbrunnen
- Twin towns: Bettlach (Switzerland)
- Website: https://www.luetschental.ch

Lütschental (German pronunciation: [ˈlʏtʃn̩ˌtaːl]) is a village and a municipality in the Interlaken-Oberhasli administrative district in the canton of Bern in Switzerland.

== History ==
Lütschental is first mentioned in 1238 as Liscinthal. In 1275 it was mentioned as Lyzental.

During the Middle Ages the Lütschine valley was part of the Herrschaft of Unspunnen. During the 13th and 14th centuries, Interlaken Monastery acquired land and rights in the village until they eventually owned most of the land and people in the area. In 1349 the residents of the village joined other villages in the Bernese Oberland in an unsuccessful rebellion against the monastery. In 1528, the city of Bern adopted the new faith of the Protestant Reformation and began imposing it on the Bernese Oberland. Lütschental joined many other villages and the monastery in an unsuccessful rebellion against the new faith. After Bern imposed its will on the Oberland, they secularized the monastery and annexed all the monastery lands. Lütschental became a part of the Bernese bailiwick of Interlaken.

Beginning in the late 19th century, the population of the village dropped as residents moved to the cities of the Swiss Plateau or emigrated in search of jobs. The construction of a power plant for the Jungfrau railway, in 1908, provided more jobs but was unable to stop the population decline. Today some residents raise livestock in alpine meadows or work in the small tourism industry. About half of the working population commute to jobs in the nearby municipality of Grindelwald.

== Geography ==
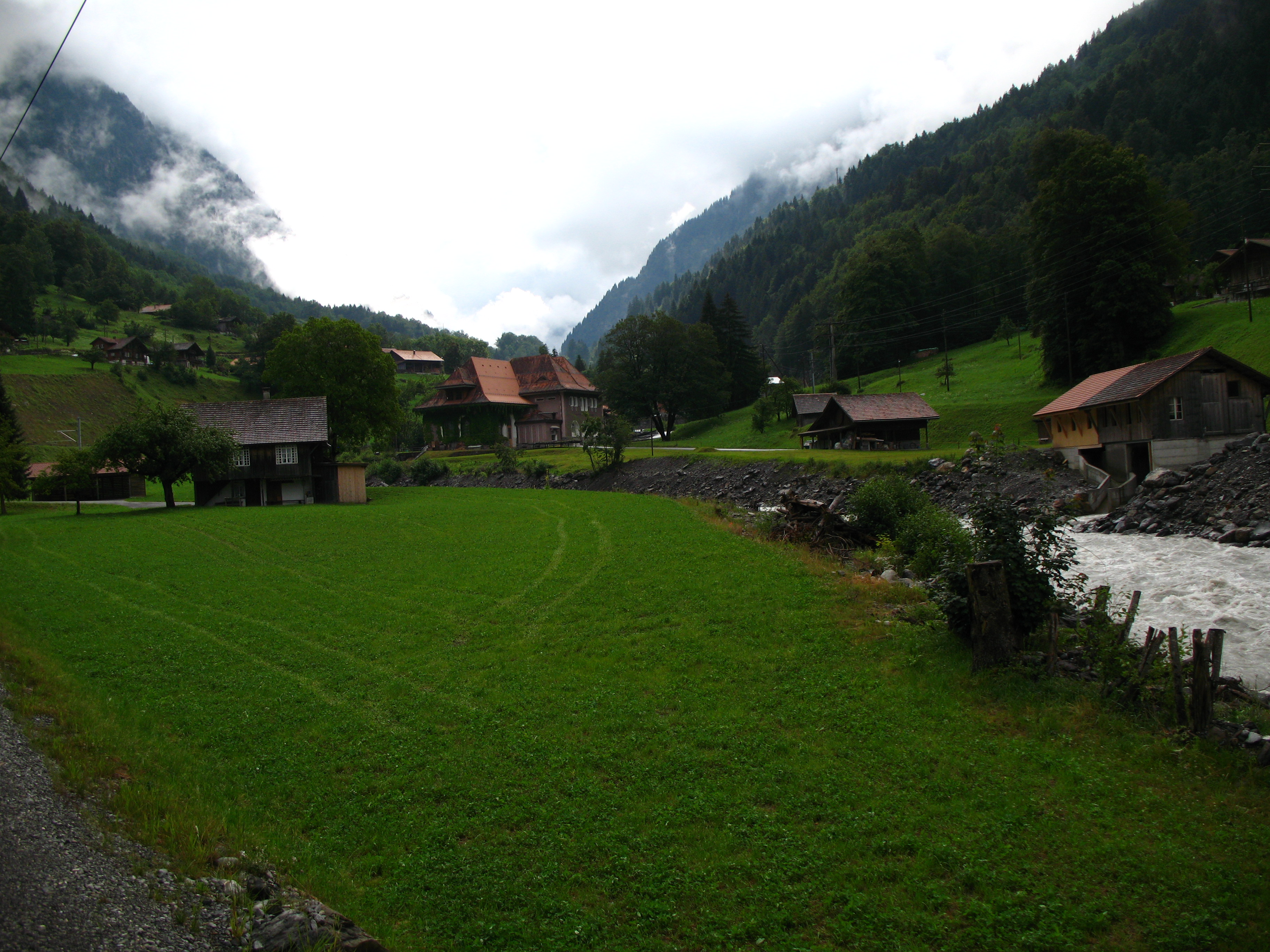
The river Schwarze Lütschine in Lütschental

Lütschental has an area of 12.28 km^{2} (4.74 sq mi). Of this area, 2.79 km^{2} (1.08 mi^{2}) or 22.6% is used for agricultural purposes, while 5.88 km^{2} (2.27 mi^{2}) or 47.6% is forested. Of the rest of the land, 0.24 km^{2} (0.093 mi^{2}) or 1.9% is settled (buildings or roads), 0.07 km^{2} (17 acres) or 0.6% is either rivers or lakes and 3.41 km^{2} (1.32 mi^{2}) or 27.6% is unproductive land.

Of the built up area, housing and buildings made up 0.8% and transportation infrastructure made up 1.1%. Out of the forested land, 39.6% of the total land area is heavily forested and 4.4% is covered with orchards or small clusters of trees. Of the agricultural land, 6.1% is pastures and 16.4% is used for alpine pastures. All the water in the municipality is flowing water. Of the unproductive areas, 14.3% is unproductive vegetation and 13.3% is too rocky for vegetation.

The peak of Winteregg, the highest mountain in the municipality, lies at 2,555 m (8,383 ft). Lütschental lies in a valley which extends from Interlaken to Grindelwald. The name Lütschental means "valley of the Lütschine River", which flows through it.

Lütschental belongs to the parish of Gsteig bei Interlaken in the municipality of Gsteigwiler.

On 31 December 2009 Amtsbezirk Interlaken, the municipality's former district, was dissolved. On the following day, 1 January 2010, it joined the newly created Verwaltungskreis Interlaken-Oberhasli.

== Coat of arms ==
The blazon of the municipal coat of arms is Or a Chamois statant Sable on a Rock Argent.

== Demographics ==
Lütschental has a population (as of December 2020) of 214. As of 2010, 7.2% of the population are resident foreign nationals. Over the last 10 years (2000-2010) the population has changed at a rate of -8.4%. Migration accounted for -1.9%, while births and deaths accounted for -3.1%.

Most of the population (as of 2000) speaks German (244 or 96.4%) as their first language, Albanian is the second most common (5 or 2.0%) and Dutch is the third (1 or 0.4%).

As of 2008, the population was 53.0% male and 47.0% female. The population was made up of 115 Swiss men (48.7% of the population) and 10 (4.2%) non-Swiss men. There were 104 Swiss women (44.1%) and 7 (3.0%) non-Swiss women. Of the population in the municipality, 114 or about 45.1% were born in Lütschental and lived there in 2000. There were 94 or 37.2% who were born in the same canton, while 23 or 9.1% were born somewhere else in Switzerland, and 15 or 5.9% were born outside of Switzerland.

As of 2010, children and teenagers (0–19 years old) make up 21.2% of the population, while adults (20–64 years old) make up 59.3% and seniors (over 64 years old) make up 19.5%.

As of 2000, there were 105 people who were single and never married in the municipality. There were 121 married individuals, 17 widows or widowers and 10 individuals who are divorced.

As of 2000, there were 20 households that consist of only one person and 11 households with five or more people. In 2000, a total of 87 apartments (68.5% of the total) were permanently occupied, while 33 apartments (26.0%) were seasonally occupied and 7 apartments (5.5%) were empty. The vacancy rate for the municipality, in 2011, was 2.24%.

The historical population is given in the following chart:

== Politics ==
In the 2011 federal election the most popular party was the Swiss People's Party (SVP) which received 60.2% of the vote. The next three most popular parties were the Green Party (12.4%), the Christian Social Party (CSP) (6.2%) and the Evangelical People's Party (EVP) (6.1%). In the federal election, a total of 85 votes were cast, and the voter turnout was 44.7%.

== Transport ==
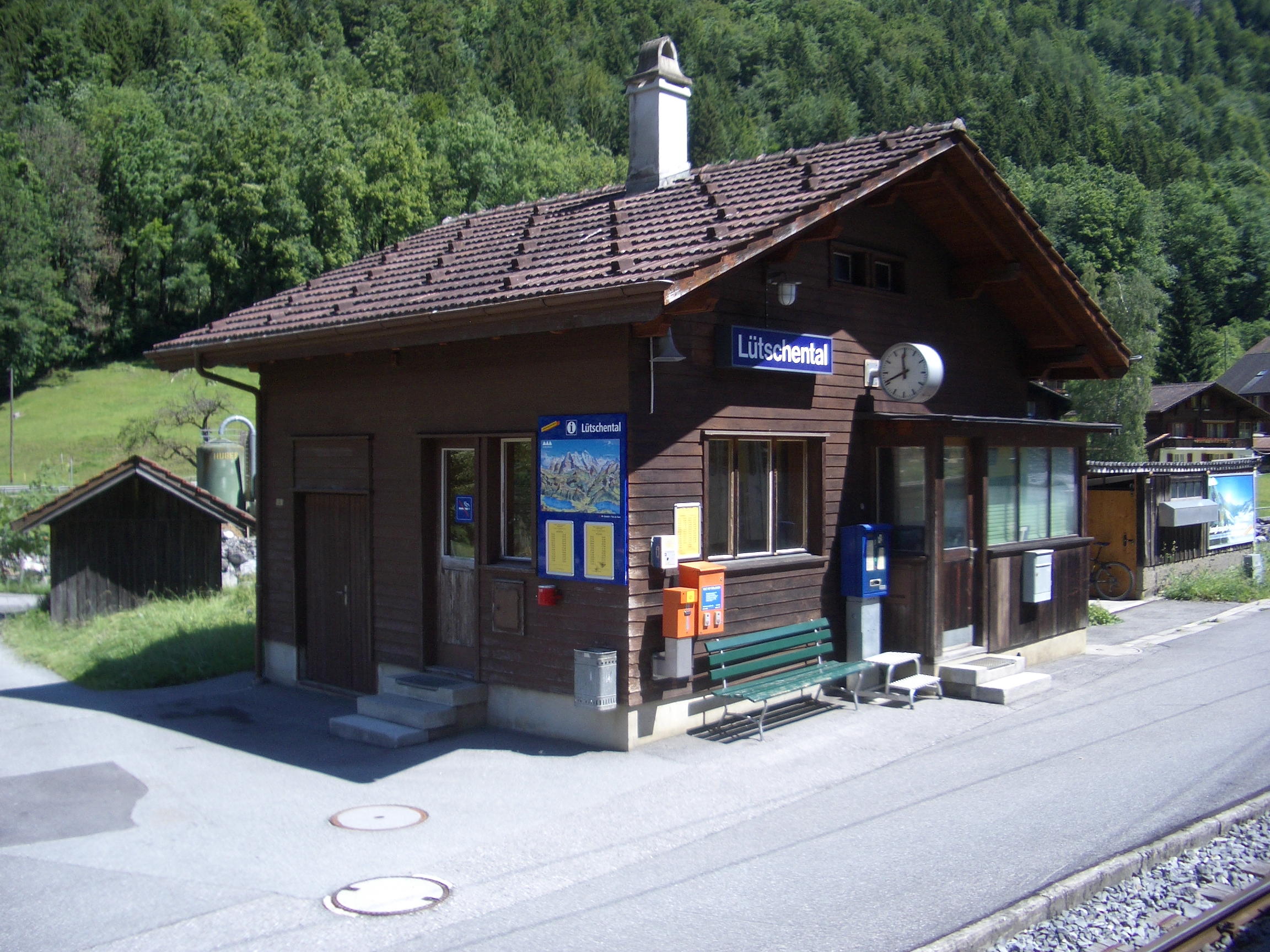
Former Lütschental Station on the Berner Oberland Bahn

Lütschental railway station is served by trains of the Berner Oberland Bahn, whose trains operate hourly or more frequent services to Interlaken Ost and Grindelwald.

== Economy ==
As of 2011, Lütschental had an unemployment rate of 1.92%. As of 2008, there were a total of 74 people employed in the municipality. Of these, there were 38 people employed in the primary economic sector and about 15 businesses involved in this sector. 14 people were employed in the secondary sector and there was 1 business in this sector. 22 people were employed in the tertiary sector, with 6 businesses in this sector. There were 114 residents of the municipality who were employed in some capacity, of which females made up 36.0% of the workforce.

In 2008 there were a total of 51 full-time equivalent jobs. The number of jobs in the primary sector was 19, all of which were in agriculture. The number of jobs in the secondary sector was 14 of which or (0.0%) were in manufacturing The number of jobs in the tertiary sector was 18. In the tertiary sector; 3 or 16.7% were in wholesale or retail sales or the repair of motor vehicles, 4 or 22.2% were in the movement and storage of goods, 7 or 38.9% were in a hotel or restaurant, 4 or 22.2% were in education.

In 2000, there were 16 workers who commuted into the municipality and 70 workers who commuted away. The municipality is a net exporter of workers, with about 4.4 workers leaving the municipality for every one entering. Of the working population, 17.5% used public transportation to get to work, and 48.2% used a private car.

== Religion ==
From the 2000 census, 14 or 5.5% were Roman Catholic, while 223 or 88.1% belonged to the Swiss Reformed Church. Of the rest of the population, there were 8 individuals (or about 3.16% of the population) who belonged to another Christian church. There were 9 (or about 3.56% of the population) who were Islamic. 2 (or about 0.79% of the population) belonged to no church, are agnostic or atheist, and 1 individuals (or about 0.40% of the population) did not answer the question.

== Education ==
In Lütschental about 99 or (39.1%) of the population have completed non-mandatory upper secondary education, and 3 or (1.2%) have completed additional higher education (either university or a Fachhochschule). Of the 3 who completed tertiary schooling, 66.7% were Swiss men, 33.3% were Swiss women. The Canton of Bern school system provides one year of non-obligatory Kindergarten, followed by six years of Primary school. This is followed by three years of obligatory lower Secondary school where the students are separated according to ability and aptitude. Following the lower Secondary students may attend additional schooling or they may enter an apprenticeship.

During the 2010–11 school year, there were a total of 23 students attending classes in Lütschental. There were no kindergarten classes in the municipality. The municipality had one primary class and 13 students. During the same year, there was one lower secondary class with a total of 10 students. One student was a permanent or temporary residents of Switzerland (not citizens) and spoke a different mother language than the classroom language.

As of 2000, there were 15 students from Lütschental who attended schools outside the municipality.
