= Bettlach, Switzerland =

Bettlach
- Municipality
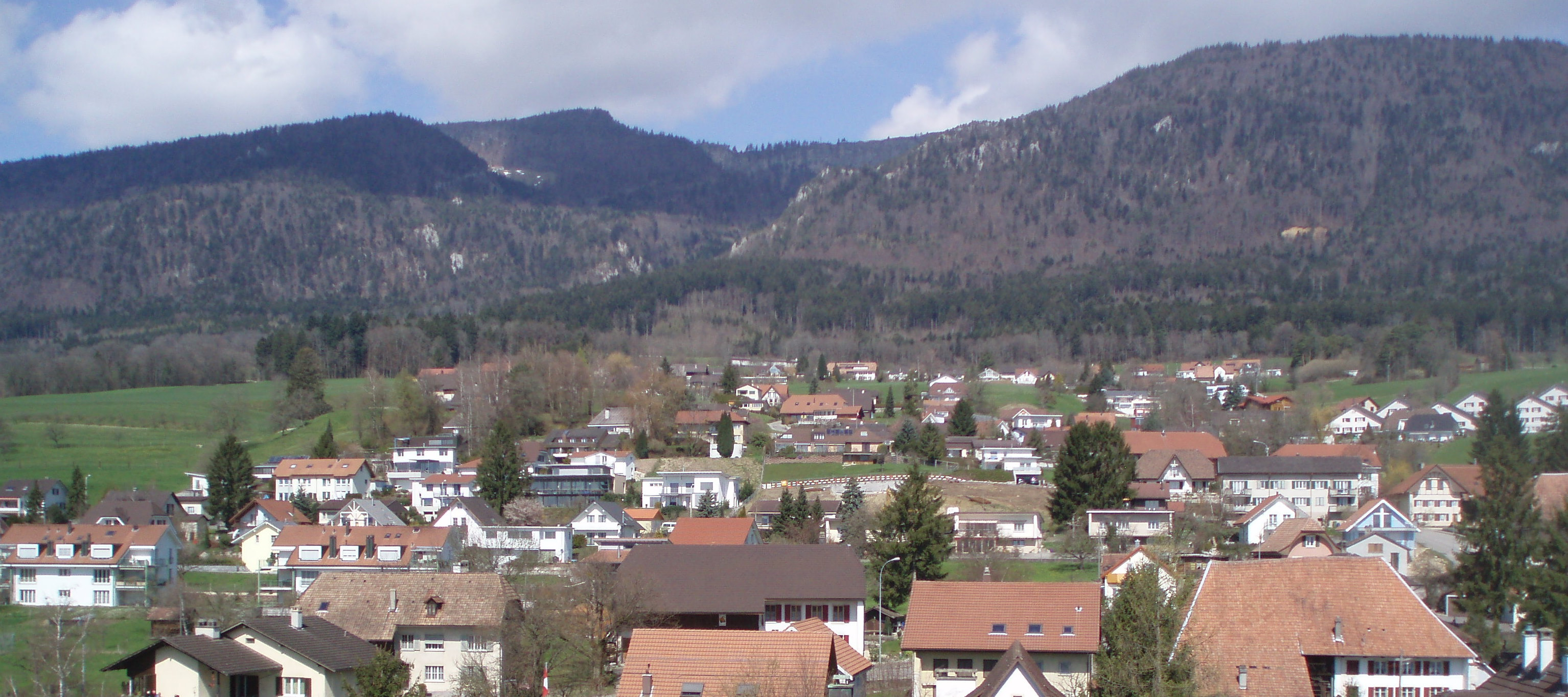
- Bettlach

- Coat of arms
- Location of Bettlach
- Location within Switzerland Location within Canton of Solothurn
- Coordinates: 47°12′N 7°26′E
- Country: Switzerland
- Canton: Solothurn
- District: Lebern

Government
  - Mayor: Hans Kuebli

Area
  - Total: 12.21 km^{2} (4.71 sq mi)
- Elevation: 479 m (1,572 ft)

Population (December 2020)
  - Total: 4,953
  - Density: 405.7/km^{2} (1,051/sq mi)
- Time zone: UTC+01:00 (CET)
  - Summer (DST): UTC+02:00 (CEST)
- Postal code: 2544
- SFOS number: 2543
- ISO 3166 code: CH-SO
- Surrounded by: Arch (BE), Grenchen, Leuzigen (BE), Selzach
- Twin towns: Lütschental (Switzerland)
- Website: www.bettlach.ch

Bettlach (German pronunciation: [ˈbɛtˌlax]; French: Bâche) is a municipality in the district of Lebern in the canton of Solothurn in Switzerland.

== History ==
Bettlach is first mentioned in 1181 as Betelacho. In 1279 it was mentioned as Bettelage and in 1329 as Betlach.

== Geography ==
Aerial view from 300 m by Walter Mittelholzer (1925)

Bettlach has an area, as of 2009, of 12.21 square kilometers (4.71 sq mi). Of this area, 5.67 km^{2} (2.19 sq mi) or 46.4% is used for agricultural purposes, while 4.59 km^{2} (1.77 sq mi) or 37.6% is forested. Of the rest of the land, 1.64 km^{2} (0.63 sq mi) or 13.4% is settled (buildings or roads), 0.17 km^{2} (0.066 sq mi) or 1.4% is either rivers or lakes and 0.15 km^{2} (37 acres) or 1.2% is unproductive land.

Of the built up area, industrial buildings made up 1.2% of the total area while housing and buildings made up 7.9% and transportation infrastructure made up 3.4%. Out of the forested land, 35.2% of the total land area is heavily forested and 2.4% is covered with orchards or small clusters of trees. Of the agricultural land, 30.9% is used for growing crops and 10.6% is pastures and 4.3% is used for alpine pastures. All the water in the municipality is flowing water.

The municipality is located in the Lebern district. It stretches from the Aare river to the edge of the Jura Mountains.

== Coat of arms ==
The blazon of the municipal coat of arms is Argent a Cross pattee couped fitche Gules.

== Demographics ==
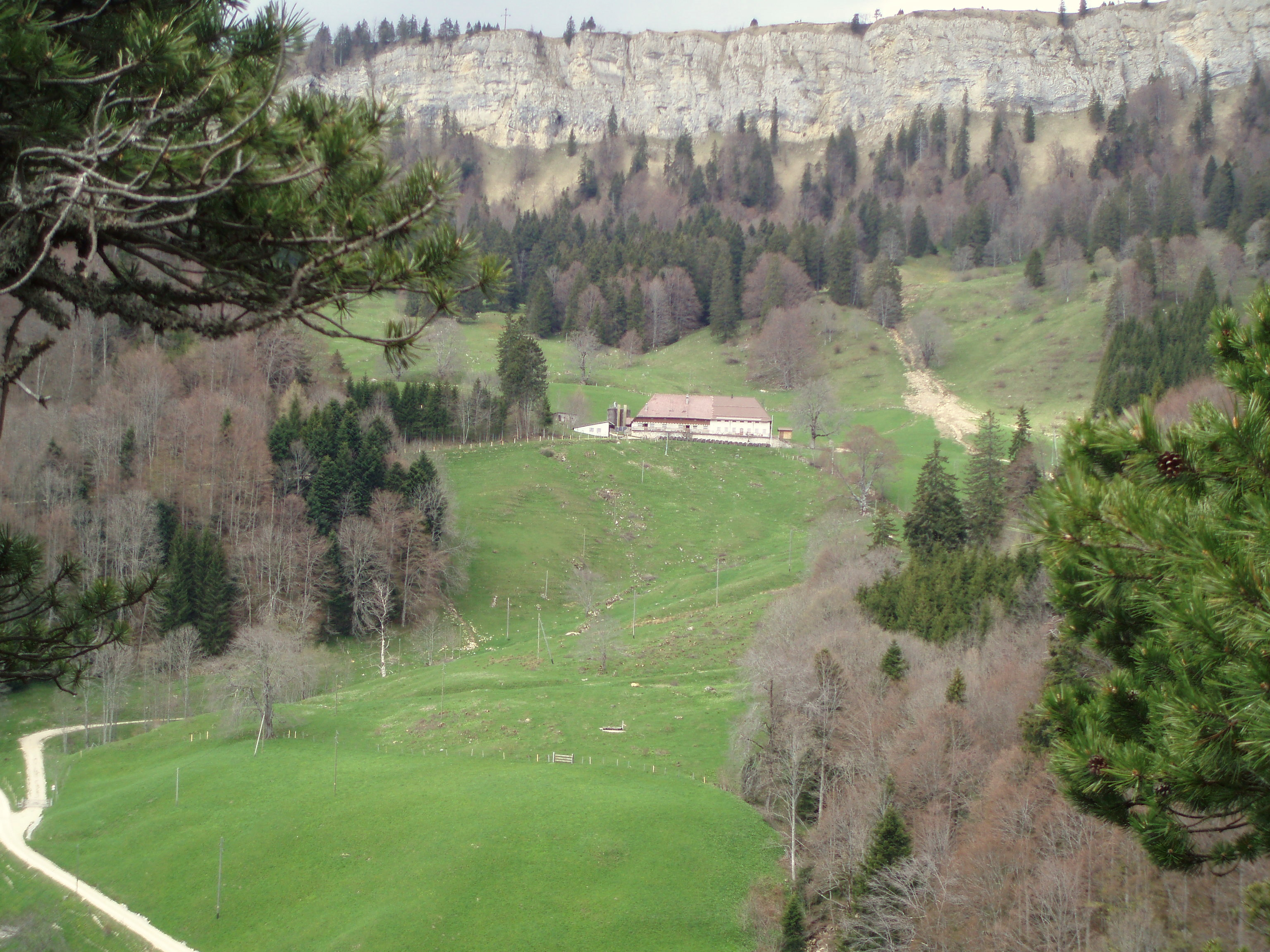
Isolated farm house near Bettlach

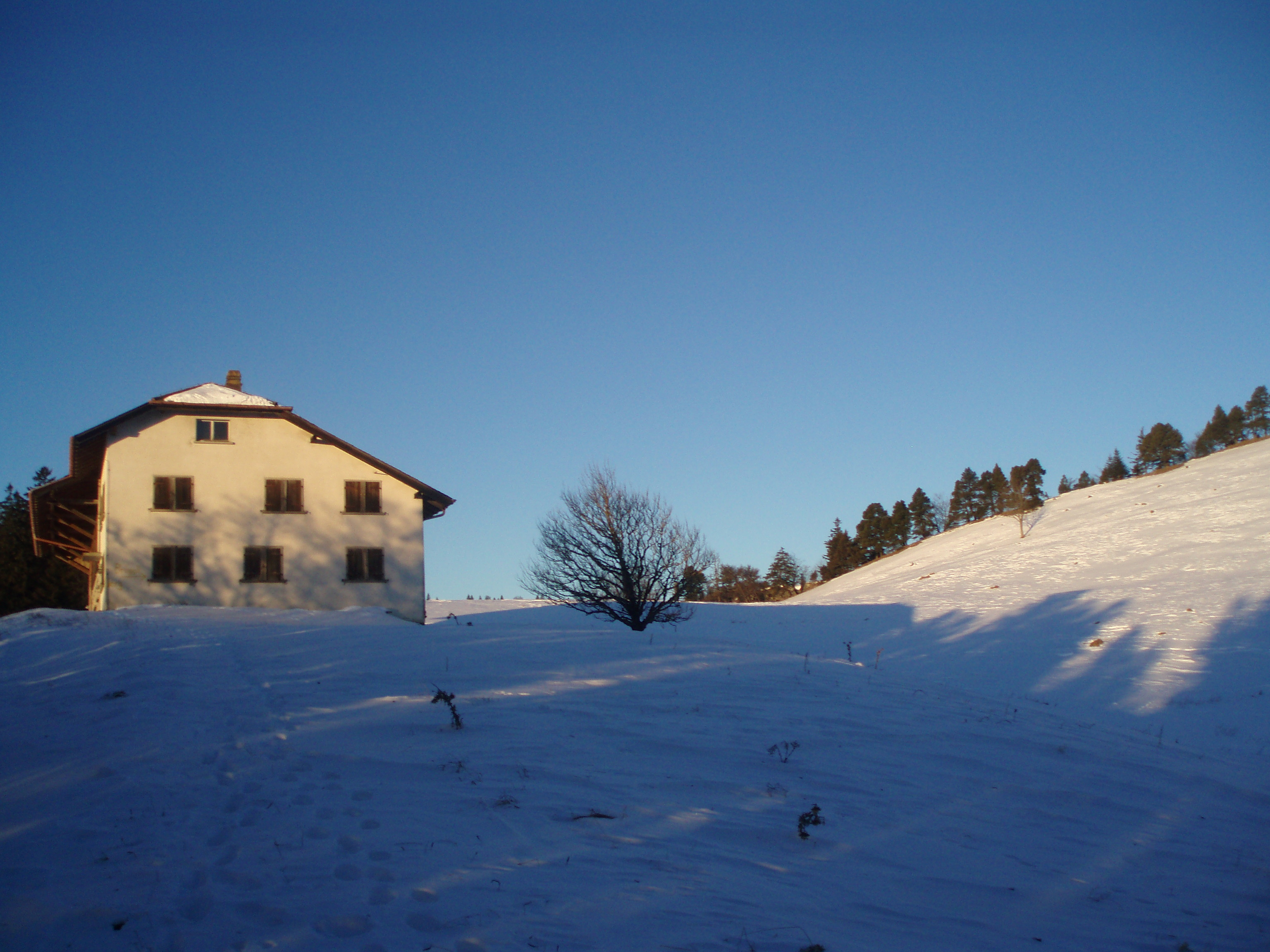
House in Bettlach

Bettlach has a population (as of December 2020) of 4,953. As of 2008, 15.6% of the population are resident foreign nationals. Over the last 10 years (1999–2009 ) the population has changed at a rate of 2.8%.

Most of the population (as of 2000) speaks German (4,168 or 88.3%), with Italian being second most common (153 or 3.2%) and French being third (80 or 1.7%). There are 3 people who speak Romansh.

As of 2008, the gender distribution of the population was 51.0% male and 49.0% female. The population was made up of 2,001 Swiss men (41.5% of the population) and 461 (9.6%) non-Swiss men. There were 1,991 Swiss women (41.3%) and 372 (7.7%) non-Swiss women. Of the population in the municipality 1,283 or about 27.2% were born in Bettlach and lived there in 2000. There were 1,488 or 31.5% who were born in the same canton, while 1,100 or 23.3% were born somewhere else in Switzerland, and 718 or 15.2% were born outside of Switzerland.

In 2008 there were 32 live births to Swiss citizens and 2 births to non-Swiss citizens, and in same time span there were 33 deaths of Swiss citizens. Ignoring immigration and emigration, the population of Swiss citizens decreased by 1 while the foreign population increased by 2. There were 4 Swiss men and 3 Swiss women who immigrated back to Switzerland. At the same time, there were 18 non-Swiss men and 6 non-Swiss women who immigrated from another country to Switzerland. The total Swiss population change in 2008 (from all sources, including moves across municipal borders) was a decrease of 39 and the non-Swiss population decreased by 12 people. This represents a population growth rate of -1.1%.

The age distribution, as of 2000, in Bettlach is; 350 children or 7.4% of the population are between 0 and 6 years old and 746 teenagers or 15.8% are between 7 and 19. Of the adult population, 230 people or 4.9% of the population are between 20 and 24 years old. 1,503 people or 31.8% are between 25 and 44, and 1,204 people or 25.5% are between 45 and 64. The senior population distribution is 529 people or 11.2% of the population are between 65 and 79 years old and there are 159 people or 3.4% who are over 80.

As of 2000, there were 1,816 people who were single and never married in the municipality. There were 2,346 married individuals, 235 widows or widowers and 324 individuals who are divorced.

As of 2000, there were 1,989 private households in the municipality, and an average of 2.3 persons per household. There were 599 households that consist of only one person and 118 households with five or more people. Out of a total of 2,014 households that answered this question, 29.7% were households made up of just one person and there were 12 adults who lived with their parents. Of the rest of the households, there are 653 married couples without children, 618 married couples with children There were 92 single parents with a child or children. There were 15 households that were made up of unrelated people and 25 households that were made up of some sort of institution or another collective housing.

In 2000 there were 584 single-family homes (or 63.9% of the total) out of a total of 914 inhabited buildings. There were 212 multi-family buildings (23.2%), along with 94 multi-purpose buildings that were mostly used for housing (10.3%) and 24 other-use buildings (commercial or industrial) that also had some housing (2.6%). Of the single-family homes 18 were built before 1919, while 142 were built between 1990 and 2000. The greatest number of single-family homes (116) were built between 1946 and 1960.

In 2000 there were 2,080 apartments in the municipality. The most common apartment size was 4 rooms of which there were 643. There were 74 single-room apartments and 632 apartments with five or more rooms. Of these apartments, a total of 1,946 apartments (93.6% of the total) were permanently occupied, while 55 apartments (2.6%) were seasonally occupied and 79 apartments (3.8%) were empty. As of 2009, the construction rate of new housing units was 2.9 new units per 1000 residents. The vacancy rate for the municipality, in 2010, was 1.72%.

The historical population is given in the following chart:

== Politics ==
In the 2007 federal election the most popular party was the SVP which received 32.3% of the vote. The next three most popular parties were the FDP (20.43%), the CVP (20.04%) and the SP (17.22%). In the federal election, a total of 1,526 votes were cast, and the voter turnout was 45.4%.

== Economy ==
As of 2010, Bettlach had an unemployment rate of 3.9%. As of 2008, there were 53 people employed in the primary economic sector and about 21 businesses involved in this sector. 1,557 people were employed in the secondary sector and there were 56 businesses in this sector. 579 people were employed in the tertiary sector, with 112 businesses in this sector. There were 2,628 residents of the municipality who were employed in some capacity, of which females made up 42.7% of the workforce.

In 2008 the total number of full-time equivalent jobs was 1,992. The number of jobs in the primary sector was 33, all of which were in agriculture. The number of jobs in the secondary sector was 1,500 of which 1,382 or (92.1%) were in manufacturing and 116 (7.7%) were in construction. The number of jobs in the tertiary sector was 459. In the tertiary sector; 116 or 25.3% were in wholesale or retail sales or the repair of motor vehicles, 14 or 3.1% were in the movement and storage of goods, 49 or 10.7% were in a hotel or restaurant, 6 or 1.3% were the insurance or financial industry, 85 or 18.5% were technical professionals or scientists, 32 or 7.0% were in education and 83 or 18.1% were in health care.

In 2000, there were 1,075 workers who commuted into the municipality and 1,859 workers who commuted away. The municipality is a net exporter of workers, with about 1.7 workers leaving the municipality for every one entering. Of the working population, 13.4% used public transportation to get to work, and 60.5% used a private car.

== Religion ==
From the 2000 census, 1,980 or 41.9% were Roman Catholic, while 1,643 or 34.8% belonged to the Swiss Reformed Church. Of the rest of the population, there were 70 members of an Orthodox church (or about 1.48% of the population), there were 18 individuals (or about 0.38% of the population) who belonged to the Christian Catholic Church, and there were 62 individuals (or about 1.31% of the population) who belonged to another Christian church. There were 225 (or about 4.77% of the population) who were Islamic. There were 12 individuals who were Buddhist, 37 individuals who were Hindu and 3 individuals who belonged to another church. 525 (or about 11.12% of the population) belonged to no church, are agnostic or atheist, and 146 individuals (or about 3.09% of the population) did not answer the question.

== Education ==
In Bettlach about 1,855 or (39.3%) of the population have completed non-mandatory upper secondary education, and 522 or (11.1%) have completed additional higher education (either university or a Fachhochschule). Of the 522 who completed tertiary schooling, 70.1% were Swiss men, 17.8% were Swiss women, 8.4% were non-Swiss men and 3.6% were non-Swiss women.

During the 2010-2011 school year there were a total of 462 students in the Bettlach school system. The education system in the Canton of Solothurn allows young children to attend two years of non-obligatory Kindergarten. During that school year, there were 82 children in kindergarten. The canton's school system requires students to attend six years of primary school, with some of the children attending smaller, specialized classes. In the municipality there were 291 students in primary school and 7 students in the special, smaller classes. The secondary school program consists of three lower, obligatory years of schooling, followed by three to five years of optional, advanced schools. 82 lower secondary students attend school in Bettlach.

As of 2000, there were 4 students in Bettlach who came from another municipality, while 171 residents attended schools outside the municipality.
