= Hubert Münch =

German footballer

Personal information
- Date of birth: 9 April 1941 (age 85)
- Place of birth: Stuttgart, Germany
- Position: Defender

Senior career*
Years	Team	Apps	(Gls)
1964–1974	FC Zürich		
1974–1977	FC Winterthur		

Managerial career
- 1979–1982: FC Frauenfeld
- 1986–1986: FC Zug
- 1989–1990: FC Schaffhausen
- 1991–1992: FC Brüttisellen-Dietlikon
- * Club domestic league appearances and goals

Hubert Münch (born 9 April 1941) is a retired German football defender and later manager.
