= Walter Müller (footballer, born 1938) =

Swiss footballer (1938-2018)

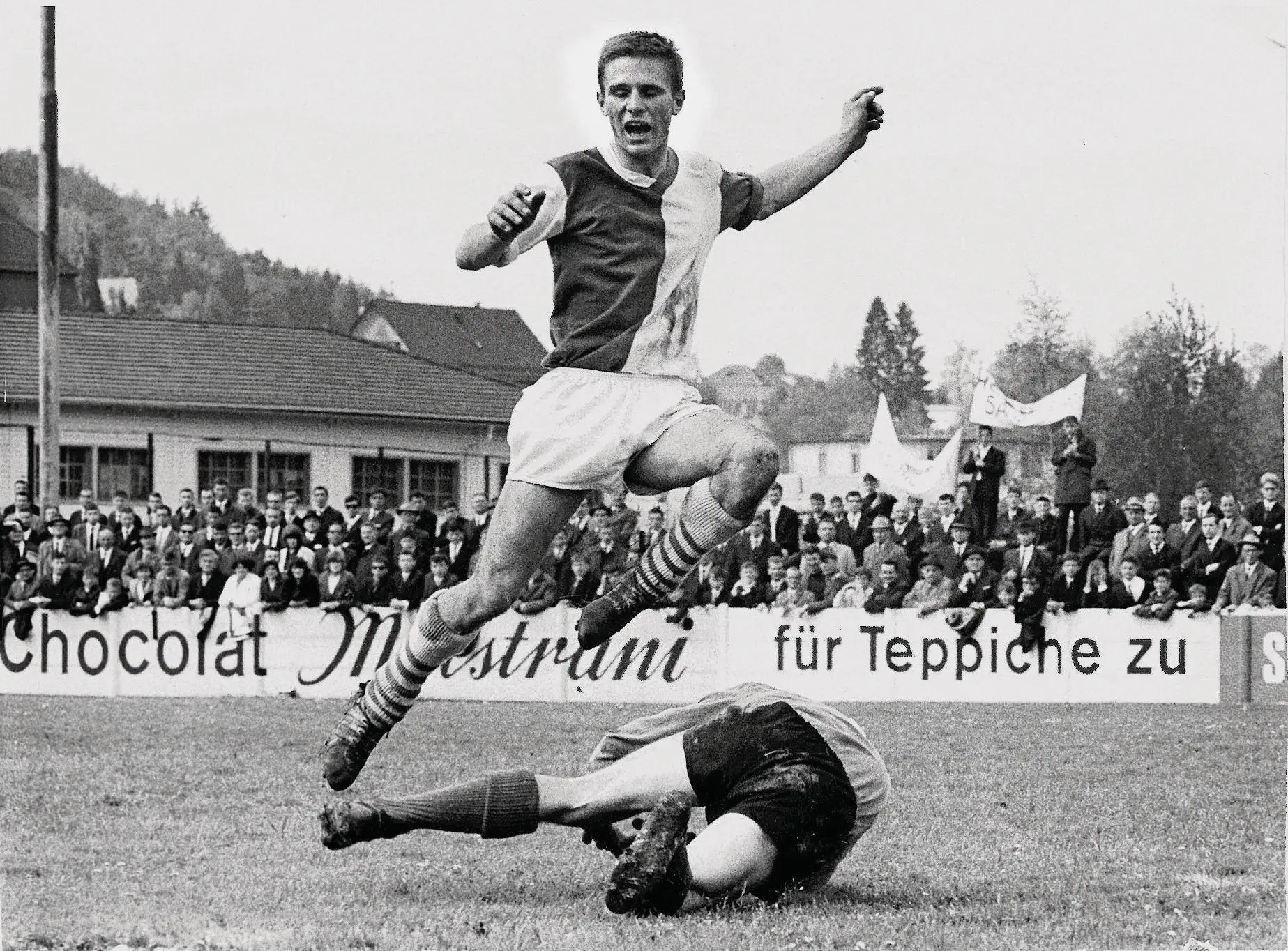

Personal information
- Date of birth: 16 November 1938
- Place of birth: Uznach, Switzerland
- Date of death: 14 August 2018 (aged 79)
- Position: Forward

International career
| Years | Team | Apps | (Gls) |
| 1969 | Switzerland | 1 | (0) |

Walter Müller (16 November 1938 – 14 August 2018) was a Swiss footballer who played as a striker for Young Boys.
