= Denis Bauda =

French football player and manager (born 1947)

- Bauda with Paris Saint-Germain in 1976

Personal information
- Date of birth: 26 February 1947 (age 79)
- Place of birth: Grenoble, France
- Height: 1.70 m (5 ft 7 in)
- Position: Midfielder

Youth career
- 1963–1964: Grenoble

Senior career*
Years	Team	Apps	(Gls)
1964–1969	Grenoble	124	(8)
1969–1972	Metz	105	(1)
1972–1973	Bastia	38	(2)
1973–1974	Nancy	37	(1)
1974–1977	Paris Saint-Germain	85	(0)
1977–1979	Poissy		
Total		406+	(12+)

International career
- France U21
- France military
1973	France B	1	(0)

Managerial career
- 1979–1980: Stiring-Wendel
- * Club domestic league appearances and goals

Denis Bauda (born 26 February 1947) is a French former professional football player and manager.

== Club career ==
Bauda played in each of the first three divisions of French football in a career lasting from 1964 to 1979. He played for Grenoble, Metz, Bastia, Nancy, Paris Saint-Germain, and Poissy as a player.

A notable first that Bauda set in his playing days was that he became the first player to be shown a red card in the Division 1 in Paris Saint-Germain's history.

== International career ==
Bauda was a U21 and military international for France. He made one appearance for the France B team in 1973.

== Managerial career ==
During the 1979–80 season, Bauda coached Stiring-Wendel. He was in charge for 26 matches and had a win percentage of 35%.
