= Christer Hult =

Swedish footballer

Personal information
- Date of birth: 4 June 1946 (age 80)
- Position: Defender

Senior career*
Years	Team	Apps	(Gls)
1964–1974 1975–?	IFK Norrköping; Kalmar FF		

International career
1971–1973	Sweden	13	(2)
- * Club domestic league appearances and goals

Christer Hult was a Swedish association football defender, playing for IFK Norrköping. He played 13 games for the Sweden national team.
