= Jost Leuzinger =

Swiss footballer (born 1952)

Personal information
- Date of birth: 2 May 1952 (age 74)
- Place of birth: Switzerland
- Position: Forward

Jost Leuzinger (born 2 May 1952) is a Swiss retired footballer who played in FC St. Gallen. He retired at the age of 28. After his retirement, Leuzinger has taken up football coaching.
