= Daniel Jeandupeux =

Swiss footballer and manager (born 1949)

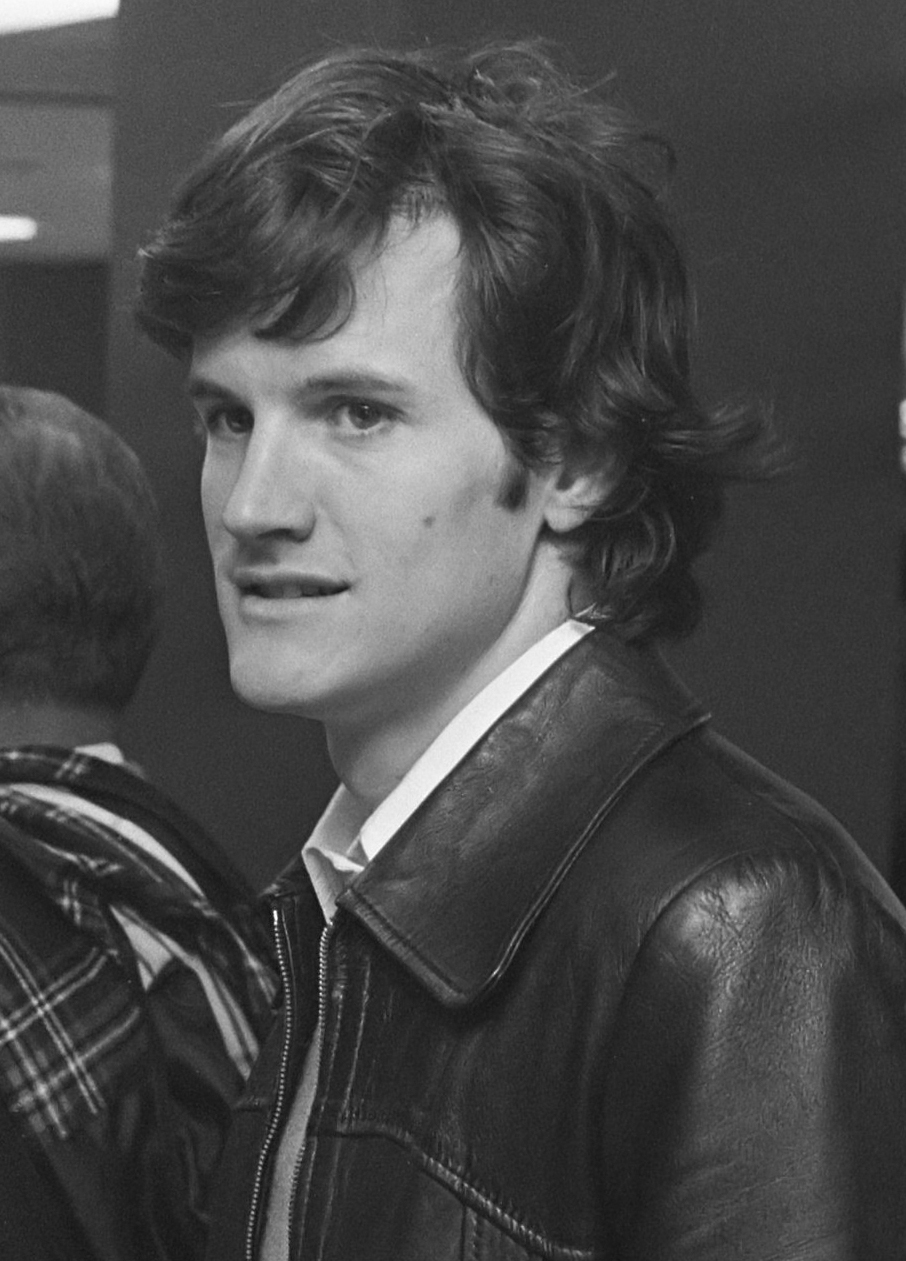

Personal information
- Date of birth: 7 February 1949 (age 77)
- Place of birth: Saint-Imier, Switzerland
- Position: Forward

Team information
- Current team: Le Mans (President's advisor)

Senior career*
Years	Team	Apps	(Gls)
1967–1971	La Chaux-de-Fonds	52	(27)
1971–1975	Zürich	49	(19)
1975–1979	Bordeaux	74	(25)
1980–1983	Zürich	2	(1)
Total		177	(72)

International career
1969–1976	Switzerland	35	(2)

Managerial career
- 1979–1980: Sion
- 1980–1983: Zürich
- 1983–1985: Toulouse
- 1986–1989: Switzerland
- 1989–1994: Caen
- 1994–1995: Strasbourg
- 1997: Caen
- 2004: Le Mans
- 2004–2009: Le Mans (President's advisor)
- 2009: Le Mans
- 2009–: Le Mans (President's advisor)
- * Club domestic league appearances and goals

Daniel Jeandupeux (born 7 February 1949) is a Swiss football manager and retired football forward.

== Career ==
Born in Saint-Imier, Jeandupeux began playing football for La Chaux-de-Fonds. In 1972, he joined Zürich, where he would win two Swiss league titles (1974 and 1975) and one Swiss cup (1973). Jeandupeux signed with French side Bordeaux in 1975. He played for Bordeaux until his career ended when his leg was broken by a tackle on 1 October 1977.

Jeandupeux made 35 appearances and scored two goals for the Switzerland national football team from 1969 to 1977.

Jeandupeux last managed Ligue 1 side Le Mans, replacing Yves Bertucci in February 2009. He was replaced in May by Arnaud Cormier, but stayed at the club as the president's advisor. Jeandupeux has also had spells managing other French sides — Caen, Toulouse, and Strasbourg. He has also managed the Swiss sides Sion and Zürich, as well as the Swiss national team.

== Statistics ==
=== Manager ===
Team	Nat	From	To	Record							
Team	Nat	From	To	G	W	D	L	Win %	GF	GA	+/-
Sion	Switzerland	1979	1980								
Zürich	Switzerland	1980	March 1983								
Toulouse	France	1983	1985								
Switzerland	Switzerland	March 1986	April 1989	28	8	8	12	28.57	32	33	-1
Caen	France	December 1989	1994								
Strasbourg	France	1994	March 1995								
Caen	France	November 1997	November 1997								
Le Mans	France	February 2004	December 2004								
Le Mans	France	2 February 2009	Present								
Total											
