= Polish football clubs in European competitions =

Football clubs from Ekstraklasa – the top Polish professional league for men's association football teams – have participated in European football competitions since 1955–56 season, when Gwardia Warsaw took part in the inaugural European Cup.

The biggest success by Polish clubs in UEFA-administered competitions is reaching a semifinal of the European Cup. The first one to achieve this round was Legia Warsaw in the 1969–70 season, followed by Widzew Łódź in the 1982–83 season. Moreover, Górnik Zabrze reached the final of the 1969–70 European Cup Winners' Cup, as did Ruch Chorzów in the 1998 UEFA Intertoto Cup.

Polish clubs were more successful in non-UEFA-administered Intertoto Cup. Polonia Bytom won the 1964–65 edition followed by losing in the final next year. Odra Opole and Zagłębie Sosnowiec reached semi-finals, each once. From 1967 to 1994, when only a group stage was held, 14 different clubs won their groups 24 times.

== Polish club distinctions in European competitions ==
=== European Cup / UEFA Champions League ===
Club	Champion	Finalist	Semi-finalist	Quarter-finalist
Legia Warsaw	–	–	1970	1971, 1996
Widzew Łódź	–	–	1983	–
Górnik Zabrze	–	–	–	1968
Ruch Chorzów	–	–	–	1975
Wisła Kraków	–	–	–	1979

=== Inter-Cities Fairs Cup / UEFA Cup / UEFA Europa League ===
Club	Champion	Finalist	Semi-finalist	Quarter-finalist
Ruch Chorzów	–	–	–	1974
Stal Mielec	–	–	–	1976

=== UEFA Conference League ===
Club	Champion	Finalist	Semi-finalist	Quarter-finalist
Lech Poznań	–	–	–	2023
Jagiellonia Białystok	–	–	–	2025
Legia Warsaw	–	–	–	2025

=== UEFA Cup Winners' Cup ===
Club	Champion	Finalist	Semi-finalist	Quarter-finalist
Górnik Zabrze	–	1970	–	1971
Legia Warsaw	–	–	1991	1965, 1982
Śląsk Wrocław	–	–	–	1977

=== UEFA Intertoto Cup ===
Club	(1961/62 – 1966/67, 1995–2008)			(1967–1994)
Club	Champion	Finalist	Semi-finalist	Group winner
Polonia Bytom	1965	1964	–	1967, 1970
Ruch Chorzów	–	1998	–	1967
Odra Opole	–	–	1964	1968, 1969
Zagłębie Sosnowiec	–	–	1967	1967, 1975
Polonia Warsaw	–	–	1999	–
Wisła Kraków	–	–	–	1969, 1970, 1973
Pogoń Szczecin	–	–	–	1977, 1983, 1987
ROW Rybnik	–	–	–	1973, 1975
Widzew Łódź	–	–	–	1976, 1982
Lech Poznań	–	–	–	1986, 1990
Legia Warsaw	–	–	–	1968
Szombierki Bytom	–	–	–	1969
Stal Mielec	–	–	–	1971
GKS Katowice	–	–	–	1984
Górnik Zabrze	–	–	–	1985

== Appearances in the main UEFA competitions ==
As of 28 August 2026

Club	UEFA Champions League (includes European Cup)		UEFA Cup Winners' Cup		UEFA Europa League (includes UEFA Cup)		UEFA Conference League		First appearance	Last appearance
Club	App.	Best result	App.	Best result	App.	Best result	App.	Best result	First appearance	Last appearance
Legia Warsaw	15	1969–70 SF	9	1990–91 SF	26	1985–86 R3	3	2024–25 QF	1956–57 EC	2025–26 UECL
Górnik Zabrze	13	1967–68 QF	2	1969–70 F	7	1977–78 R2	1	2026–27 PO	1961–62 EC	2026–27 UECL
Wisła Kraków	8	1978–79 QF	2	1967–68, 1984–85 R2	13	2002–03 R4	1	2024–25 PO	1967–68 CWC	2024–25 UECL
Lech Poznań	10	1990–91, 1992–93, 1993–94 R2	2	1982–83, 1988–89 R2	16	2008–09, 2010–11 Ro32	3	2022–23 QF	1978–79 UC	2026–27 UEL
Widzew Łódź	5	1982–83 SF	1	1985–86 R1	10	1980–81, 1984–85 R3			1977–78 UC	1999–2000 UC
Ruch Chorzów	4	1974–75 QF	1	1996–97 R1	6	1973–74 QF			1972–73 UC	2014–15 UEL
Śląsk Wrocław	2	1977–78 R1	2	1976–77 QF	8	1975–76, 1978–79 R3	2	2021–22, 2024–25 Q3	1975–76 UC	2024–25 UECL
Gwardia Warsaw	2	1955–56 R1	1	1974–75 R2	1	1973–74 R2			1955–56 EC	1974–75 CWC
ŁKS Łódź	2	1998–99 Q2	1	1994–95 R1	1	1998–99 R1			1959–60 EC	1998–99 UC
Zagłębie Lubin	2	1991–92 R1			4	1990–91, 1995–96 R1			1990–91 UC	2016–17 UEL
Stal Mielec	2	1973–74, 1976–77 R1			3	1975–76 QF			1973–74 EC	1982–83 UC
Polonia Bytom	2	1962–63 R1							1958–59 EC	1962–63 EC
Jagiellonia Białystok	1	2024–25 Q3			7	2026–27 LP	2	2024–25 QF	2010–11 UEL	2026–27 UEL
Polonia Warsaw	1	2000–01 Q3			5	2000–01, 2001–02, 2002–03 R1			1998–99 UC	2009–10 UEL
Piast Gliwice	1	2019–20 Q1			4	2020–21 Q3			2013–14 UEL	2020–21 UEL
Raków Częstochowa	1	2023–24 PO			1	2023–24 GS	4	2025–26 R16	2021–22 UECL	2026–27 UECL
Szombierki Bytom	1	1980–81 R2			1	1981–82 R1			1980–81 EC	1981–82 UC
Zagłębie Sosnowiec			5	1963–64, 1971–72, 1977–78, 1978–79 R1	1	1972–73 R1			1962–63 CWC	1978–79 CWC
GKS Katowice			4	1986–87, 1991–92 R2	7	1994–95 R3	1	2026–27 Q3	1986–87 CWC	2026–27 UECL
Amica Wronki			1	1998–99 R1	4	2004–05 GS			1998–99 CWC	2004–05 UC
Arka Gdynia			1	1979–80 R1	1	2017–18 Q3			1979–80 CWC	2017–18 UEL
Lechia Gdańsk			1	1983–84 R1	1	2019–20 Q2	1	2022–23 Q2	1983–84 CWC	2022–23 UECL
Stal Rzeszów			1	1975–76 R2					1975–76 CWC	1975–76 CWC
Miedź Legnica			1	1992–93 R1					1992–93 CWC	1992–93 CWC
Dyskobolia					3	2003–04 R3			2003–04 UC	2007–08 UC
Pogoń Szczecin					3	1984–85, 1987–88 R1	3	2023–24 Q3	1984–85 UC	2023–24 UECL
Wisła Płock					3	2005–06, 2006–07 Q2			2003–04 UC	2006–07 UC
Cracovia					3	2016–17, 2019–20, 2020–21 Q1			2016–17 UEL	2020–21 UEL
Zagłębie Wałbrzych					1	1971–72 R2			1971–72 UC	1971–72 UC
GKS Tychy					1	1976–77 R1			1976–77 UC	1976–77 UC
Hutnik Kraków					1	1996–97 R1			1996–97 UC	1996–97 UC
Odra Opole					1	1977–78 R1			1977–78 UC	1977–78 UC
GKS Bełchatów					1	2007–08 Q2			2007–08 UC	2007–08 UC
Odra Wodzisław					1	1997–98 Q2			1997–98 UC	1997–98 UC
Zawisza Bydgoszcz					1	2014–15 Q2			2014–15 UEL	2014–15 UEL

Currently competing ; App. = Appearances; Q = Qualifying round; R = Round; GS = Group stage; LP = League phase; QF = Quarter-finals; SF = Semi-finals; F = Final; EC = European Cup; UCL = UEFA Champions League; UC = UEFA Cup; UEL = UEFA Europa League; UECL = UEFA Conference League; CWC = UEFA Cup Winners' Cup

== Full record ==
=== European Cup / UEFA Champions League ===
Season	Club	Round	Opponent	Home	Away
European Cup
1955–56	Gwardia Warsaw	1st round	(Sweden) Djurgårdens IF	**1–4**	**0–0**
1956–57	CWKS Warsaw	Preliminary round	(Czechoslovakia) Slovan Bratislava	**2–0**	**0–4**
1957–58	Gwardia Warsaw	Preliminary round	(East Germany) SC Wismut Karl Marx Stadt	**3–1**	**1–3,** **1–1** (c)
1958–59	Polonia Bytom	Preliminary round	(Hungary) MTK Budapest	**0–3**	**0–3**
1959–60	ŁKS Łódź	Preliminary round	(Luxembourg) Jeunesse Esch	**2–1**	**0–5**
1960–61	Legia Warsaw	Preliminary round	(Denmark) Aarhus Gymnastikforening	**1–0**	**0–3**
1961–62	Górnik Zabrze	Preliminary round	(England) Tottenham Hotspur	**4–2**	**1–8**
1962–63	Polonia Bytom	Preliminary round	(Greece) Panathinaikos	**2–1**	**4–1**
1962–63	Polonia Bytom	1st round	(Turkey) Galatasaray	**1–0**	**1–4**
1963–64	Górnik Zabrze	Preliminary round	Austria Wien	**1–0**	**0–1, 2–1**
1963–64	Górnik Zabrze	1st round	(Czechoslovakia) Dukla Prague	**2–0**	**1–4**
1964–65	Górnik Zabrze	Preliminary round	(Czechoslovakia) Dukla Prague	**3–0**	**1–4,** **0–0** (c)
1965–66	Górnik Zabrze	Preliminary round	(Austria) Linzer ASK	**3–1**	**2–1**
1965–66	Górnik Zabrze	1st round	(Czechoslovakia) Sparta Prague	**1–2**	**0–3**
1966–67	Górnik Zabrze	1st round	(East Germany) FC Vorwärts Berlin	**2–1,** **3–1**	**1–2**
1966–67	Górnik Zabrze	2nd round	(Bulgaria) CSKA Red Flag	**3–0**	**0–4**
1967–68	Górnik Zabrze	1st round	(Sweden) Djurgårdens IF	**3–0**	**1–0**
1967–68	Górnik Zabrze	2nd round	(Soviet Union) Dynamo Kyiv	**1–1**	**2–1**
1967–68	Górnik Zabrze	Quarter-finals	(England) **Manchester United**	**1–0**	**0–2**
1968–69	Ruch Chorzów	1st round	(Soviet Union) Dynamo Kyiv	both withdrawn	
1969–70	Legia Warsaw	First round	(Romania) UTA Arad	**8–0**	**2–1**
1969–70	Legia Warsaw	2nd round	(France) Saint-Étienne	**2–1**	**1–0**
1969–70	Legia Warsaw	Quarter-finals	(Turkey) Galatasaray	**2–0**	**1–1**
1969–70	Legia Warsaw	Semi-finals	(Netherlands) **Feyenoord**	**0–0**	**0–2**
1970–71	Legia Warsaw	1st round	(Sweden) IFK Göteborg	**2–1**	**4–0**
1970–71	Legia Warsaw	2nd round	(Belgium) Standard Liège	**2–0**	**0–1**
1970–71	Legia Warsaw	Quarter-finals	(Spain) Atlético Madrid	**2–1**	**0–1** (a)
1971–72	Górnik Zabrze	1st round	(France) Marseille	**1–1**	**1–2**
1972–73	Górnik Zabrze	1st round	(Malta) Sliema Wanderers	**5–0**	**5–0**
1972–73	Górnik Zabrze	2nd round	(Soviet Union) Dynamo Kyiv	**2–1**	**0–2**
1973–74	Stal Mielec	1st round	(Socialist Federal Republic of Yugoslavia) Red Star Belgrade	**0–1**	**1–2**
1974–75	Ruch Chorzów	1st round	(Denmark) Hvidovre IF	**2–1**	**0–0**
1974–75	Ruch Chorzów	2nd round	(Turkey) Fenerbahçe	**2–1**	**2–0**
1974–75	Ruch Chorzów	Quarter-finals	(France) Saint-Étienne	**3–2**	**0–2**
1975–76	Ruch Chorzów	1st round	(Finland) KuPS	**5–0**	**2–2**
1975–76	Ruch Chorzów	2nd round	(Netherlands) PSV Eindhoven	**1–3**	**0–4**
1976–77	Stal Mielec	1st round	(Spain) Real Madrid	**1–2**	**0–1**
1977–78	Śląsk Wrocław	1st round	(Bulgaria) Levski-Spartak	**2–2**	**0–3**
1978–79	Wisła Kraków	1st round	(Belgium) Club Brugge	**3–1**	**1–2**
1978–79	Wisła Kraków	2nd round	(Czechoslovakia) Zbrojovka Brno	**1–1**	**2–2** (a)
1978–79	Wisła Kraków	Quarter-finals	(Sweden) Malmö FF	**2–1**	**1–4**
1979–80	Ruch Chorzów	1st round	(East Germany) Berliner FC Dynamo	**0–0**	**1–4**
1980–81	Szombierki Bytom	1st round	(Turkey) Trabzonspor	**3–0**	**1–2**
1980–81	Szombierki Bytom	2nd round	(Bulgaria) CSKA September Flag	**0–1**	**0–4**
1981–82	Widzew Łódź	1st round	(Belgium) Anderlecht	**1–4**	**1–2**
1982–83	Widzew Łódź	1st round	(Malta) Hibernians	**3–1**	**4–1**
1982–83	Widzew Łódź	2nd round	(Austria) Rapid Wien	**5–3**	**1–2**
1982–83	Widzew Łódź	Quarter-finals	(England) Liverpool	**2–0**	**2–3**
1982–83	Widzew Łódź	Semi-finals	(Italy) Juventus	**2–2**	**0–2**
1983–84	Lech Poznań	1st round	(Spain) Athletic Bilbao	**2–0**	**0–4**
1984–85	Lech Poznań	1st round	(England) Liverpool	**0–1**	**0–4**
1985–86	Górnik Zabrze	1st round	(West Germany) Bayern Munich	**1–2**	**1–4**
1986–87	Górnik Zabrze	1st round	(Belgium) Anderlecht	**1–1**	**0–2**
1987–88	Górnik Zabrze	1st round	(Greece) Olympiacos	**2–1**	**1–1**
1987–88	Górnik Zabrze	2nd round	(Scotland) Rangers	**1–1**	**1–3**
1988–89	Górnik Zabrze	1st round	(Luxembourg) Jeunesse Esch	**3–0**	**4–1**
1988–89	Górnik Zabrze	2nd round	(Spain) Real Madrid	**0–1**	**2–3**
1989–90	Ruch Chorzów	1st round	(Bulgaria) CFKA Sredets	**1–1**	**1–5**
1990–91	Lech Poznań	1st round	(Greece) Panathinaikos	**3–0**	**2–1**
1990–91	Lech Poznań	2nd round	(France) Marseille	**3–2**	**1–6**
1991–92	Zagłębie Lubin	1st round	(Denmark) Brøndby	**2–1**	**0–3**
Champions League
1992–93	Lech Poznań	1st round	(Latvia) Skonto	**2–0**	**0–0**
1992–93	Lech Poznań	2nd round	(Sweden) IFK Göteborg	**0–3**	**0–1**
1993–94	Lech Poznań	1st round	(Israel) Beitar Jerusalem	**3–0**	**4–2**
1993–94	Lech Poznań	2nd round	(Russia) Spartak Moscow	**1–5**	**1–2**
1994–95	Legia Warsaw	Qualifying round	(Croatia) Hajduk Split	**0–1**	**0–4**
1995–96	Legia Warsaw	Qualifying round	(Sweden) IFK Göteborg	**1–0**	**2–1**
1995–96	Legia Warsaw	Group stage (Group B)	(England) Blackburn Rovers	**1–0**	**0–0**
1995–96	Legia Warsaw	Group stage (Group B)	(Norway) Rosenborg	**3–1**	**0–4**
1995–96	Legia Warsaw	Group stage (Group B)	(Russia) Spartak Moscow	**0–1**	**1–2**
1995–96	Legia Warsaw	Quarter-finals	(Greece) Panathinaikos	**0–0**	**0–3**
1996–97	Widzew Łódź	Qualifying round	(Denmark) Brøndby	**2–1**	**2–3** (a)
1996–97	Widzew Łódź	Group stage (Group B)	(Spain) Atlético Madrid	**1–4**	**0–1**
1996–97	Widzew Łódź	Group stage (Group B)	(Germany) **Borussia Dortmund**	**2–2**	**1–2**
1996–97	Widzew Łódź	Group stage (Group B)	(Romania) Steaua București	**2–0**	**0–1**
1997–98	Widzew Łódź	1st qual. round	(Azerbaijan) Neftçi	**8–0**	**2–0**
1997–98	Widzew Łódź	2nd qual. round	(Italy) Parma	**1–3**	**0–4**
1998–99	ŁKS Łódź	1st qual. round	(Azerbaijan) Kapaz	**3–1**	**4–1**
1998–99	ŁKS Łódź	2nd qual. round	(England) **Manchester United**	**0–0**	**0–2**
1999–00	Widzew Łódź	2nd qual. round	(Bulgaria) Litex Lovech	**4–1 (3–2** p)	**1–4**
1999–00	Widzew Łódź	3rd qual. round	(Italy) Fiorentina	**0–2**	**1–3**
2000–01	Polonia Warsaw	2nd qual. round	(Romania) Dinamo București	**3–1**	**4–3**
2000–01	Polonia Warsaw	3rd qual. round	(Greece) Panathinaikos	**2–2**	**1–2**
2001–02	Wisła Kraków	2nd qual. round	(Latvia) Skonto	**1–0**	**2–1**
2001–02	Wisła Kraków	3rd qual. round	(Spain) Barcelona	**3–4**	**0–1**
2002–03	Legia Warsaw	2nd qual. round	(North Macedonia) Vardar	**1–1**	**3–1**
2002–03	Legia Warsaw	3rd qual. round	(Spain) Barcelona	**0–1**	**0–3**
2003–04	Wisła Kraków	2nd qual. round	(Cyprus) Omonia	**5–2**	**2–2**
2003–04	Wisła Kraków	3rd qual. round	(Belgium) Anderlecht	**0–1**	**1–3**
2004–05	Wisła Kraków	2nd qual. round	(Georgia (country)) WIT Georgia	**3–0**	**8–2**
2004–05	Wisła Kraków	3rd qual. round	(Spain) Real Madrid	**0–2**	**1–3**
2005–06	Wisła Kraków	3rd qual. round	(Greece) Panathinaikos	**3–1**	**1–4** (a.e.t.)
2006–07	Legia Warsaw	2nd qual. round	(Iceland) Fimleikafélag Hafnarfjarðar	**2–0**	**1–0**
2006–07	Legia Warsaw	3rd qual. round	(Ukraine) Shakhtar Donetsk	**2–3**	**0–1**
2007–08	Zagłębie Lubin	2nd qual. round	(Romania) Steaua București	**0–1**	**1–2**
2008–09	Wisła Kraków	2nd qual. round	(Israel) Beitar Jerusalem	**5–0**	**1–2**
2008–09	Wisła Kraków	3rd qual. round	(Spain) **Barcelona**	**1–0**	**0–4**
2009–10	Wisła Kraków	2nd qual. round	(Estonia) Levadia Tallinn	**1–1**	**0–1**
2010–11	Lech Poznań	2nd qual. round	(Azerbaijan) Inter Baku	**1–0 (9–8** p)	**0–1**
2010–11	Lech Poznań	3rd qual. round	(Czech Republic) Sparta Prague	**0–1**	**0–1**
2011–12	Wisła Kraków	2nd qual. round	(Latvia) Skonto	**2–0**	**1–0**
2011–12	Wisła Kraków	3rd qual. round	(Bulgaria) Litex Lovech	**3–1**	**2–1**
2011–12	Wisła Kraków	Play-off round	(Cyprus) APOEL	**1–0**	**1–3**
2012–13	Śląsk Wrocław	2nd qual. round	(Montenegro) Budućnost Podgorica	**0–1**	**2–0**
2012–13	Śląsk Wrocław	3rd qual. round	(Sweden) Helsingborgs IF	**0–3**	**1–3**
2013–14	Legia Warsaw	2nd qual. round	(Wales) The New Saints	**1–0**	**3–1**
2013–14	Legia Warsaw	3rd qual. round	(Norway) Molde	**0–0** (a)	**1–1**
2013–14	Legia Warsaw	Play-off round	(Romania) Steaua București	**2–2** (a)	**1–1**
2014–15	Legia Warsaw	2nd qual. round	(Republic of Ireland) St Patrick's Athletic	**1–1**	**5–0**
2014–15	Legia Warsaw	3rd qual. round	(Scotland) Celtic	**4–1**	**0–3** (w/o)(a)
2015–16	Lech Poznań	2nd qual. round	(Bosnia and Herzegovina) Sarajevo	**1–0**	**2–0**
2015–16	Lech Poznań	3rd qual. round	(Switzerland) Basel	**1–3**	**0–1**
2016–17	Legia Warsaw	2nd qual. round	(Bosnia and Herzegovina) Zrinjski Mostar	**2–0**	**1–1**
2016–17	Legia Warsaw	3rd qual. round	(Slovakia) Trenčín	**0–0**	**1–0**
2016–17	Legia Warsaw	Play-off round	(Republic of Ireland) Dundalk	**1–1**	**2–0**
2016–17	Legia Warsaw	Group stage (Group F)	(Germany) Borussia Dortmund	**0–6**	**4–8**
2016–17	Legia Warsaw	Group stage (Group F)	(Spain) **Real Madrid**	**3–3**	**1–5**
2016–17	Legia Warsaw	Group stage (Group F)	(Portugal) Sporting CP	**1–0**	**0–2**
2017–18	Legia Warsaw	2nd qual. round	(Finland) Mariehamn	**6–0**	**3–0**
2017–18	Legia Warsaw	3rd qual. round	(Kazakhstan) Astana	**1–0**	**1–3**
2018–19	Legia Warsaw	1st qual. round	(Republic of Ireland) Cork City	**3–0**	**1–0**
2018–19	Legia Warsaw	2nd qual. round	(Slovakia) Spartak Trnava	**0–2**	**1–0**
2019–20	Piast Gliwice	1st qual. round	(Belarus) BATE Borisov	**1–2**	**1–1**
2020–21	Legia Warsaw	1st qual. round	(Northern Ireland) Linfield	**1–0**	—N/a
2020–21	Legia Warsaw	2nd qual. round	(Cyprus) Omonia	**0–2** (a.e.t.)	—N/a
2021–22	Legia Warsaw	1st qual. round	(Norway) Bodø/Glimt	**2–0**	**3–2**
2021–22	Legia Warsaw	2nd qual. round	(Estonia) Flora	**2–1**	**1–0**
2021–22	Legia Warsaw	3rd qual. round	(Croatia) Dinamo Zagreb	**0–1**	**1–1**
2022–23	Lech Poznań	1st qual. round	(Azerbaijan) Qarabağ	**1–0**	**1–5**
2023–24	Raków Częstochowa	1st qual. round	(Estonia) Flora	**1–0**	**3–0**
2023–24	Raków Częstochowa	2nd qual. round	(Azerbaijan) Qarabağ	**3–2**	**1–1**
2023–24	Raków Częstochowa	3rd qual. round	(Cyprus) Aris Limassol	**2–1**	**1–0**
2023–24	Raków Częstochowa	Play-off round	(Denmark) Copenhagen	**0–1**	**1–1**
2024–25	Jagiellonia Białystok	2nd qual. round	(Lithuania) Panevėžys	**3–1**	**4–0**
2024–25	Jagiellonia Białystok	3rd qual. round	(Norway) Bodø/Glimt	**0–1**	**1–4**
2025–26	Lech Poznań	2nd qual. round	(Iceland) Breiðablik	**7–1**	**1–0**
2025–26	Lech Poznań	3rd qual. round	(Serbia) Red Star Belgrade	**1–3**	**1–1**
2026–27	Lech Poznań	2nd qual. round	(Denmark) AGF	**1–4** (3–4 p)	**4–1**
2026–27	Górnik Zabrze	2nd qual. round	(Turkey) Fenerbahçe	**1–1**	**0–1**

Bold denotes the competition winner.

=== Inter-Cities Fairs Cup / UEFA Cup / UEFA Europa League ===
==== Non-UEFA ====
Season	Club	Round	Opponent	Home	Away
Inter-Cities Fairs Cup
Did not participate before 1968–69 season
**1968–69**	Legia Warsaw	1st round	(West Germany) TSV 1860 Munich	6–0	3–2
**1968–69**	Legia Warsaw	2nd round	(Belgium) Waregem	2–0	0–1
**1968–69**	Legia Warsaw	3rd round	(Hungary) Újpesti Dózsa	0–1	2–2
**1969–70**	Gwardia Warsaw	1st round	(Socialist Federal Republic of Yugoslavia) Vojvodina	1–1	1–0
**1969–70**	Gwardia Warsaw	2nd round	(Scotland) Dunfermline Athletic	0–1	1–2
**1969–70**	Ruch Chorzów	1st round	(Austria) Wiener SC	4–1	2–4
**1969–70**	Ruch Chorzów	2nd round	(Netherlands) Ajax	1–2	0–7
**1970–71**	GKS Katowice	1st round	(Spain) Barcelona	0–1	2–3
**1970–71**	Ruch Chorzów	1st round	(Italy) Fiorentina	1–1	0–2

==== UEFA ====
Season	Club	Round	Opponent	Home	Away
UEFA Cup
1971–72	Legia Warsaw	1st round	(Switzerland) Lugano	**0–0**	**3–1**
1971–72	Legia Warsaw	2nd round	(Romania) Rapid București	**2–0**	**0–4**
1971–72	Zagłębie Wałbrzych	1st round	(Czechoslovakia) Teplice	**1–0**	**3–2**
1971–72	Zagłębie Wałbrzych	2nd round	(Romania) UTA Arad	**1–1**	**1–2** (a.e.t.)
1972–73	Ruch Chorzów	1st round	(Turkey) Fenerbahçe	**3–0**	**0–1**
1972–73	Ruch Chorzów	2nd round	(East Germany) Dynamo Dresden	**0–1**	**0–3**
1972–73	Zagłębie Sosnowiec	1st round	(Portugal) Vitória	**1–0**	**1–6**
1973–74	Gwardia Warsaw	1st round	(Hungary) Ferencváros	**2–1**	**1–0**
1973–74	Gwardia Warsaw	2nd round	(Netherlands) **Feyenoord**	**1–0**	**1–3**
1973–74	Ruch Chorzów	1st round	(West Germany) Wuppertaler SV	**4–1**	**4–5**
1973–74	Ruch Chorzów	2nd round	(East Germany) Carl Zeiss Jena	**3–0**	**0–1**
1973–74	Ruch Chorzów	3rd round	(Hungary) Budapesti Honvéd	**5–0**	**0–2**
1973–74	Ruch Chorzów	Quarter-finals	(Netherlands) **Feyenoord**	**1–1**	**1–3** (a.e.t.)
1974–75	Górnik Zabrze	1st round	(Socialist Federal Republic of Yugoslavia) Partizan	**2–2**	**0–3**
1974–75	Legia Warsaw	1st round	(France) Nantes	**0–1**	**2–2**
1975–76	Stal Mielec	1st round	(Denmark) Holbæk B&I	**2–1**	**1–0**
1975–76	Stal Mielec	2nd round	(East Germany) Carl Zeiss Jena	**1–0** **(3–2** p)	**0–1**
1975–76	Stal Mielec	3rd round	(Czechoslovakia) Internacionál Slovnaft Bratislava	**2–0**	**0–1**
1975–76	Stal Mielec	Quarter–Finals	(West Germany) Hamburger SV	**0–1**	**1–1**
1975–76	Śląsk Wrocław	1st round	(Sweden) GAIS	**4–2**	**1–2**
1975–76	Śląsk Wrocław	2nd round	(Belgium) Royal Antwerp	**1–1**	**2–1**
1975–76	Śląsk Wrocław	3rd round	(England) **Liverpool**	**1–2**	**0–3**
1976–77	GKS Tychy	1st round	(West Germany) 1. FC Köln	**1–1**	**0–2**
1976–77	Wisła Kraków	1st round	(Scotland) Celtic	**2–0**	**2–2**
1976–77	Wisła Kraków	2nd round	(Belgium) RWD Molenbeek	**1–1**	**1–1** **(4–5** p)
1977–78	Górnik Zabrze	1st round	(Finland) Haka	**5–3**	**0–0**
1977–78	Górnik Zabrze	2nd round	(England) Aston Villa	**1–1**	**0–2**
1977–78	Odra Opole	1st round	(East Germany) 1. FC Magdeburg	**1–2**	**1–1**
1977–78	Widzew Łódź	1st round	(England) Manchester City	**0–0**	**2–2** (a)
1977–78	Widzew Łódź	2nd round	(Netherlands) **PSV Eindhoven**	**3–5**	**0–1**
1978–79	Lech Poznań	1st round	(West Germany) MSV Duisburg	**2–5**	**0–5**
1978–79	Śląsk Wrocław	1st round	(Cyprus) Pezoporikos	**5–1**	**2–2**
1978–79	Śląsk Wrocław	2nd round	(Iceland) ÍBV-íþróttafélag	**2–1**	**2–0**
1978–79	Śląsk Wrocław	3rd round	(West Germany) **Borussia Mönchengladbach**	**2–4**	**1–1**
1979–80	Stal Mielec	1st round	(Denmark) AGF	**0–1**	**1–1**
1979–80	Widzew Łódź	1st round	(France) Saint-Étienne	**2–1**	**0–3**
1980–81	Śląsk Wrocław	1st round	(Scotland) Dundee United	**0–0**	**2–7**
1980–81	Widzew Łódź	1st round	(England) Manchester United	**0–0**	**1–1** (a)
1980–81	Widzew Łódź	2nd round	(Italy) Juventus	**3–1**	**1–3** **(4–1** p)
1980–81	Widzew Łódź	3rd round	(England) **Ipswich Town**	**1–0**	**0–5**
1981–82	Szombierki Bytom	1st round	(Netherlands) Feyenoord	**1–1**	**0–2**
1981–82	Wisła Kraków	1st round	(Sweden) Malmö	**1–3**	**0–2**
1982–83	Stal Mielec	1st round	(Belgium) Lokeren	**1–1**	**0–0** (a)
1982–83	Śląsk Wrocław	1st round	(Soviet Union) Dynamo Moscow	**2–2**	**1–0**
1982–83	Śląsk Wrocław	2nd round	(Switzerland) Servette	**0–2**	**1–5**
1983–84	Widzew Łódź	1st round	(Sweden) Elfsborg	**0–0**	**2–2** (a)
1983–84	Widzew Łódź	2nd round	(Czechoslovakia) Sparta ČKD Prague	**1–0**	**0–3**
1984–85	Pogoń Szczecin	1st round	(West Germany) 1. FC Köln	**0–1**	**1–2**
1984–85	Widzew Łódź	1st round	(Denmark) AGF	**2–0**	**0–1**
1984–85	Widzew Łódź	2nd round	(West Germany) Borussia Mönchengladbach	**1–0** (a)	**2–3**
1984–85	Widzew Łódź	3rd round	(Soviet Union) Dinamo Minsk	**0–2**	**1–0**
1985–86	Lech Poznań	1st round	(West Germany) Borussia Mönchengladbach	**0–2**	**1–1**
1985–86	Legia Warsaw	1st round	(Norway) Viking	**3–0**	**1–1**
1985–86	Legia Warsaw	2nd round	(Hungary) Videoton Sport Club	**1–1**	**1–0**
1985–86	Legia Warsaw	3rd round	(Italy) Inter Milan	**0–1** (a.e.t.)	**0–0**
1986–87	Legia Warsaw	1st round	(Soviet Union) Dnepr	**0–0**	**1–0**
1986–87	Legia Warsaw	2nd round	(Italy) Inter Milan	**3–2**	**0–1** (a)
1986–87	Widzew Łódź	1st round	(Austria) Linzer ASK	**1–0**	**1–1**
1986–87	Widzew Łódź	2nd round	(West Germany) Bayer 05 Uerdingen	**0–0**	**0–2**
1987–88	GKS Katowice	1st round	(Romania) Sportul Studențesc București	**1–2**	**0–1**
1987–88	Pogoń Szczecin	1st round	(Italy) Hellas Verona	**1–1**	**1–3**
1988–89	GKS Katowice	1st round	(Scotland) Rangers	**2–4**	**0–1**
1988–89	Legia Warsaw	1st round	(West Germany) Bayern Munich	**3–7**	**1–3**
1989–90	GKS Katowice	1st round	(Finland) RoPS	**0–1**	**1–1**
1989–90	Górnik Zabrze	1st round	(Italy) **Juventus**	**0–1**	**2–4**
1990–91	GKS Katowice	1st round	(Finland) TuPS	**3–0**	**1–0**
1990–91	GKS Katowice	2nd round	(West Germany) Bayer 04 Leverkusen	**1–2**	**0–4**
1990–91	Zagłębie Lubin	1st round	(Italy) Bologna	**0–1**	**0–1**
1991–92	Górnik Zabrze	1st round	(Germany) Hamburger SV	**0–3**	**1–1**
1992–93	GKS Katowice	1st round	(Turkey) Galatasaray	**0–0**	**1–2**
1992–93	Widzew Łódź	1st round	(Germany) Eintracht Frankfurt	**2–2**	**0–9**
1993–94	Did not participate				
1994–95	GKS Katowice	Preliminary round	(Wales) Cardiff Institute of Higher Education	**6–0**	**2–0**
1994–95	GKS Katowice	1st round	(Greece) Aris Thessaloniki	**1–0**	**0–1** **(4–3** p)
1994–95	GKS Katowice	2nd round	(France) Bordeaux	**1–0**	**1–1**
1994–95	GKS Katowice	3rd round	(Germany) Bayer 04 Leverkusen	**1–4**	**0–4**
1994–95	Górnik Zabrze	Preliminary round	(Republic of Ireland) Shamrock Rovers	**7–0**	**1–0**
1994–95	Górnik Zabrze	1st round	(Austria) Admira Wacker	**1–1**	**2–5**
1995–96	Widzew Łódź	Preliminary round	(Wales) Bangor City	**1–0**	**4–0**
1995–96	Widzew Łódź	1st round	(Ukraine) Chornomorets Odesa	**1–0** **(5–6** p)	**0–1**
1995–96	Zagłębie Lubin	Preliminary round	(Armenia) Shirak	**0–0**	**1–0**
1995–96	Zagłębie Lubin	1st round	(Italy) Milan	**1–4**	**0–4**
1996–97	Hutnik Kraków	Preliminary round	(Azerbaijan) Khazri Buzovna	**9–0**	**2–2**
1996–97	Hutnik Kraków	Qualifying round	(Czech Republic) Sigma Olomouc	**3–1**	**0–1**
1996–97	Hutnik Kraków	1st round	(France) AS Monaco	**0–1**	**1–3**
1996–97	Legia Warsaw	Preliminary round	(Luxembourg) Jeunesse Esch	**3–0**	**4–2**
1996–97	Legia Warsaw	Qualifying round	(Finland) Haka	**3–0**	**1–1**
1996–97	Legia Warsaw	1st round	(Greece) Panathinaikos	**2–0** (a)	**2–4**
1996–97	Legia Warsaw	2nd round	(Turkey) Beşiktaş	**1–1**	**1–2**
1997–98	Odra Wodzisław	1st qual. round	(North Macedonia) Pobeda	**3–0**	**1–2**
1997–98	Odra Wodzisław	2nd qual. round	(Russia) Rotor Volgograd	**3–4**	**0–2**
1997–98	Widzew Łódź	1st round	(Italy) Udinese	**1–0**	**0–3**
1998–99	ŁKS Łódź	1st round	(France) AS Monaco	**1–3**	**0–0**
1998–99	Polonia Warsaw	1st qual. round	(Estonia) Tallinna Sadam	**3–1**	**2–0**
1998–99	Polonia Warsaw	2nd qual. round	(Russia) Dynamo Moscow	**0–1**	**0–1**
1998–99	Wisła Kraków	1st qual. round	(Wales) Newtown	**7–0**	**0–0**
1998–99	Wisła Kraków	2nd qual. round	(Turkey) Trabzonspor	**5–1**	**2–1**
1998–99	Wisła Kraków	1st round	(Slovenia) Maribor	**3–0**	**2–0**
1998–99	Wisła Kraków	2nd round	(Italy) **Parma**	**1–1**	**1–2**
1999–00	Amica Wronki	1st round	(Denmark) Brøndby	**2–0**	**3–4**
1999–00	Amica Wronki	2nd round	(Spain) Atlético Madrid	**1–4**	**0–1**
1999–00	Lech Poznań	Qualifying round	(Latvia) Liepājas Metalurgs	**3–1**	**2–3**
1999–00	Lech Poznań	1st round	(Sweden) Göteborg	**1–2**	**0–0**
1999–00	Legia Warsaw	Qualifying round	(North Macedonia) Vardar	**4–0**	**5–0**
1999–00	Legia Warsaw	1st round	(Cyprus) Anorthosis Famagusta	**2–0**	**0–1**
1999–00	Legia Warsaw	2nd round	(Italy) Udinese	**1–1**	**0–1**
1999–00	Widzew Łódź	1st round	(Latvia) Skonto	**2–0**	**0–1**
1999–00	Widzew Łódź	2nd round	(France) AS Monaco	**1–1**	**0–2**
2000–01	Amica Wronki	Qualifying round	(Liechtenstein) Vaduz	**3–0**	**3–3**
2000–01	Amica Wronki	1st round	(Russia) Alania Vladikavkaz	**2–0**	**3–0**
2000–01	Amica Wronki	2nd round	(Germany) Hertha BSC	**1–1**	**1–3**
2000–01	Polonia Warsaw	1st round	(Italy) Udinese	**0–1**	**0–2**
2000–01	Ruch Chorzów	Qualifying round	(Lithuania) Žalgiris	**6–0**	**1–2**
2000–01	Ruch Chorzów	1st round	(Italy) Inter Milan	**0–3**	**1–4**
2000–01	Wisła Kraków	Qualifying round	(Bosnia and Herzegovina) Željezničar Sarajevo	**3–1**	**0–0**
2000–01	Wisła Kraków	1st round	(Spain) Real Zaragoza	**4–1** **(4–3** p)	**1–4**
2000–01	Wisła Kraków	2nd round	(Portugal) Porto	**0–0**	**0–3**
2001–02	Legia Warsaw	Qualifying round	(Luxembourg) Etzella Ettelbruck	**2–1**	**4–0**
2001–02	Legia Warsaw	1st round	(Sweden) Elfsborg	**4–1**	**6–1**
2001–02	Legia Warsaw	2nd round	(Spain) Valencia	**1–1**	**1–6**
2001–02	Pogoń Szczecin	Qualifying round	(Iceland) Fylkir	**1–1**	**1–2**
2001–02	Polonia Warsaw	Qualifying round	(Wales) Total Network Solutions	**4–0**	**2–0**
2001–02	Polonia Warsaw	1st round	(Netherlands) Twente	**1–2**	**0–2**
2001–02	Wisła Kraków	1st round	(Croatia) Hajduk Split	**1–0**	**2–2**
2001–02	Wisła Kraków	2nd round	(Italy) Inter Milan	**1–0**	**0–2**
2002–03	Amica Wronki	Qualifying round	(Wales) Total Network Solutions	**5–0**	**7–2**
2002–03	Amica Wronki	1st round	(Switzerland) Servette	**1–2** (a)	**3–2**
2002–03	Amica Wronki	2nd round	(Spain) Málaga	**1–2**	**1–2**
2002–03	Legia Warsaw	1st round	(Netherlands) Utrecht	**4–1**	**3–1**
2002–03	Legia Warsaw	2nd round	(Germany) Schalke 04	**2–3**	**0–0**
2002–03	Polonia Warsaw	Qualifying round	(Malta) Sliema Wanderers	**2–0**	**3–1**
2002–03	Polonia Warsaw	1st round	(Portugal) **Porto**	**2–0**	**0–6**
2002–03	Wisła Kraków	Qualifying round	(Northern Ireland) Glentoran	**4–0**	**2–0**
2002–03	Wisła Kraków	1st round	(Slovenia) Primorje	**6–1**	**2–0**
2002–03	Wisła Kraków	2nd round	(Italy) Parma	**4–1** (a.e.t.)	**1–2**
2002–03	Wisła Kraków	3rd round	(Germany) Schalke 04	**1–1**	**4–1**
2002–03	Wisła Kraków	4th round	(Italy) Lazio	**1–2**	**3–3**
2003–04	Dyskobolia Grodzisk Wielkopolski	Qualifying round	(Lithuania) Atlantas	**2–0**	**4–1**
2003–04	Dyskobolia Grodzisk Wielkopolski	1st round	(Germany) Hertha BSC	**1–0**	**0–0**
2003–04	Dyskobolia Grodzisk Wielkopolski	2nd round	(England) Manchester City	**0–0**	**1–1** (a)
2003–04	Dyskobolia Grodzisk Wielkopolski	3rd round	(France) Bordeaux	**0–1**	**1–4**
2003–04	GKS Katowice	Qualifying round	(North Macedonia) Cementarnica 55	**1–1** (a)	**0–0**
2003–04	Wisła Kraków	1st round	(Netherlands) NEC Nijmegen	**2–1**	**2–1**
2003–04	Wisła Kraków	2nd round	(Norway) Vålerenga	**0–0** **(3–4** p)	**0–0**
2003–04	Wisła Płock	Qualifying round	(Latvia) Ventspils	**2–2** (a)	**1–1**
2004–05	Amica Wronki	2nd qual. round	(Hungary) Budapest Honvéd	**1–0**	**0–1** **(5–4** p)
2004–05	Amica Wronki	1st round	(Latvia) Ventspils	**1–0**	**1–1**
2004–05	Amica Wronki	Group stage (Group F)	(France) AJ Auxerre	–	**1–5**
2004–05	Amica Wronki	Group stage (Group F)	(Netherlands) AZ	**1–3**	–
2004–05	Amica Wronki	Group stage (Group F)	(Austria) Grazer AK	–	**1–3**
2004–05	Amica Wronki	Group stage (Group F)	(Scotland) Rangers	**0–5**	–
2004–05	Lech Poznań	2nd qual. round	(Russia) Terek Grozny	**0–1**	**0–1**
2004–05	Legia Warsaw	2nd qual. round	(Georgia (country)) Tbilisi	**6–0**	**1–0**
2004–05	Legia Warsaw	1st round	Austria Wien	**1–3**	**0–1**
2004–05	Wisła Kraków	1st round	(Georgia (country)) Dinamo Tbilisi	**4–3**	**1–2** (a)
2005–06	Dyskobolia Grodzisk Wielkopolski	2nd qual. round	(Slovakia) Dukla Banská Bystrica	**4–1**	**0–0**
2005–06	Dyskobolia Grodzisk Wielkopolski	1st round	(France) Lens	**2–4**	**1–1**
2005–06	Legia Warsaw	2nd qual. round	(Switzerland) Zürich	**0–1**	**1–4**
2005–06	Wisła Kraków	1st round	(Portugal) Vitória	**0–1**	**0–3**
2005–06	Wisła Płock	2nd qual. round	(Switzerland) Grasshopper	**3–2** (a)	**0–1**
2006–07	Legia Warsaw	1st round	Austria Wien	**1–1**	**0–1**
2006–07	Wisła Kraków	2nd qual. round	(Austria) SV Mattersburg	**1–0**	**1–1**
2006–07	Wisła Kraków	1st round	(Greece) Iraklis	**0–1**	**2–0** (a.e.t.)
2006–07	Wisła Kraków	Group stage (Group E)	(Switzerland) Basel	**3–1**	–
2006–07	Wisła Kraków	Group stage (Group E)	(England) Blackburn Rovers	**1–2**	–
2006–07	Wisła Kraków	Group stage (Group E)	(Netherlands) Feyenoord	–	**1–3**
2006–07	Wisła Kraków	Group stage (Group E)	(France) AS Nancy	–	**1–2**
2006–07	Wisła Płock	2nd qual. round	(Ukraine) Chornomorets Odesa	**1–1** (a)	**0–0**
2006–07	Zagłębie Lubin	1st qual. round	(Belarus) Dinamo Minsk	**1–1**	**0–0** (a)
2007–08	Dyskobolia Grodzisk Wielkopolski	1st qual. round	(Azerbaijan) MKT Araz Imisli	**1–0**	**0–0**
2007–08	Dyskobolia Grodzisk Wielkopolski	2nd qual. round	(Kazakhstan) Tobol	**2–0**	**1–0**
2007–08	Dyskobolia Grodzisk Wielkopolski	1st round	(Serbia) Red Star Belgrade	**0–1**	**0–1**
2007–08	GKS Bełchatów	1st qual. round	(Georgia (country)) Ameri Tbilisi	**2–0**	**0–2** **(4–2** p)
2007–08	GKS Bełchatów	2nd qual. round	(Ukraine) Dnipro	**2–4**	**1–1**
2008–09	Lech Poznań	1st qual. round	(Azerbaijan) Khazar Lankaran	**4–1**	**1–0**
2008–09	Lech Poznań	2nd qual. round	(Switzerland) Grasshopper	**6–0**	**0–0**
2008–09	Lech Poznań	1st round	Austria Wien	**4–2** (a.e.t.)	**1–2**
2008–09	Lech Poznań	Group stage (Group H)	(Russia) CSKA Moscow	–	**1–2**
2008–09	Lech Poznań	Group stage (Group H)	(Spain) Deportivo de La Coruña	**1–1**	–
2008–09	Lech Poznań	Group stage (Group H)	(Netherlands) Feyenoord	–	**1–0**
2008–09	Lech Poznań	Group stage (Group H)	(France) AS Nancy	**2–2**	–
2008–09	Lech Poznań	Round of 32	(Italy) Udinese	**2–2**	**1–2**
2008–09	Legia Warsaw	1st qual. round	(Belarus) FC Gomel	**0–0**	**4–1**
2008–09	Legia Warsaw	2nd qual. round	(Russia) FC Moscow	**1–2**	**0–2**
2008–09	Wisła Kraków	1st round	(England) Tottenham Hotspur	**1–1**	**1–2**
Europa League
2009–10	Lech Poznań	3rd qual. round	(Norway) Fredrikstad	**1–2**	**6–1**
2009–10	Lech Poznań	Play-off round	(Belgium) Club Brugge	**1–0**	**0–1** **(3–4** p)
2009–10	Legia Warsaw	2nd qual. round	(Georgia (country)) Olimpi Rustavi	**3–0**	**1–0**
2009–10	Legia Warsaw	3rd qual. round	(Denmark) Brøndby	**2–2** (a)	**1–1**
2009–10	Polonia Warsaw	1st qual. round	(Montenegro) Budućnost Podgorica	**0–1**	**2–0**
2009–10	Polonia Warsaw	2nd qual. round	(San Marino) Juvenes/Dogana	**4–0**	**1–0**
2009–10	Polonia Warsaw	3rd qual. round	(Netherlands) NAC Breda	**0–1**	**1–3**
2010–11	Jagiellonia Białystok	3rd qual. round	(Greece) Aris Thessaloniki	**1–2**	**2–2**
2010–11	Lech Poznań	Play-off round	(Ukraine) Dnipro	**0–0**	**1–0**
2010–11	Lech Poznań	Group stage (Group A)	(Italy) Juventus	**1–1**	**3–3**
2010–11	Lech Poznań	Group stage (Group A)	(England) Manchester City	**3–1**	**1–3**
2010–11	Lech Poznań	Group stage (Group A)	(Austria) Red Bull Salzburg	**2–0**	**1–0**
2010–11	Lech Poznań	Round of 32	(Portugal) Braga	**1–0**	**0–2**
2010–11	Ruch Chorzów	1st qual. round	(Kazakhstan) Shakhter Karagandy	**1–0**	**2–1**
2010–11	Ruch Chorzów	2nd qual. round	(Malta) Valletta	**0–0**	**1–1** (a)
2010–11	Ruch Chorzów	3rd qual. round	Austria Wien	**1–3**	**0–3**
2010–11	Wisła Kraków	2nd qual. round	(Lithuania) Šiauliai	**5–0**	**2–0**
2010–11	Wisła Kraków	3rd qual. round	(Azerbaijan) Qarabağ	**0–1**	**2–3**
2011–12	Jagiellonia Białystok	1st qual. round	(Kazakhstan) Irtysh Pavlodar	**1–0**	**0–2**
2011–12	Legia Warsaw	3rd qual. round	(Turkey) Gaziantepspor	**0–0**	**1–0**
2011–12	Legia Warsaw	Play-off round	(Russia) Spartak Moscow	**2–2**	**3–2**
2011–12	Legia Warsaw	Group stage (Group C)	(Israel) Hapoel Tel Aviv	**3–2**	**0–2**
2011–12	Legia Warsaw	Group stage (Group C)	(Netherlands) PSV Eindhoven	**0–3**	**0–1**
2011–12	Legia Warsaw	Group stage (Group C)	(Romania) Rapid București	**3–1**	**1–0**
2011–12	Legia Warsaw	Round of 32	(Portugal) Sporting	**2–2**	**0–1**
2011–12	Śląsk Wrocław	2nd qual. round	(Scotland) Dundee United	**1–0**	**2–3** (a)
2011–12	Śląsk Wrocław	3rd qual. round	(Bulgaria) Lokomotiv Sofia	**0–0**	**0–0** **(4–3** p)
2011–12	Śląsk Wrocław	Play-off round	(Romania) Rapid București	**1–3**	**1–1**
2011–12	Wisła Kraków	Group stage (Group K)	(England) Fulham	**1–0**	**1–4**
2011–12	Wisła Kraków	Group stage (Group K)	(Denmark) Odense	**1–3**	**2–1**
2011–12	Wisła Kraków	Group stage (Group K)	(Netherlands) Twente	**2–1**	**1–4**
2011–12	Wisła Kraków	Round of 32	(Belgium) Standard Liège	**1–1**	**0–0** (a)
2012–13	Lech Poznań	1st qual. round	(Kazakhstan) Zhetysu	**2–0**	**1–1**
2012–13	Lech Poznań	2nd qual. round	(Azerbaijan) Khazar Lankaran	**1–0**	**1–1**
2012–13	Lech Poznań	3rd qual. round	(Sweden) AIK	**1–0**	**0–3**
2012–13	Legia Warsaw	2nd qual. round	(Latvia) Liepājas Metalurgs	**5–1**	**2–2**
2012–13	Legia Warsaw	3rd qual. round	(Austria) SV Ried	**3–1**	**1–2**
2012–13	Legia Warsaw	Play-off round	(Norway) Rosenborg	**1–1**	**1–2**
2012–13	Ruch Chorzów	2nd qual. round	(North Macedonia) Metalurg Skopje	**3–1**	**3–0**
2012–13	Ruch Chorzów	3rd qual. round	(Czech Republic) Viktoria Plzeň	**0–2**	**0–5**
2012–13	Śląsk Wrocław	Play-off round	(Germany) Hannover 96	**3–5**	**1–5**
2013–14	Lech Poznań	2nd qual. round	(Finland) Honka	**2–1**	**3–1**
2013–14	Lech Poznań	3rd qual. round	(Lithuania) Žalgiris	**2–1** (a)	**0–1**
2013–14	Legia Warsaw	Group stage (Group J)	(Cyprus) Apollon Limassol	**0–1**	**2–0**
2013–14	Legia Warsaw	Group stage (Group J)	(Italy) S.S. LazioLazio	**0–2**	**0–1**
2013–14	Legia Warsaw	Group stage (Group J)	(Turkey) Trabzonspor	**0–2**	**0–2**
2013–14	Piast Gliwice	2nd qual. round	(Azerbaijan) Qarabağ	**2–2** (a.e.t.)	**1–2**
2013–14	Śląsk Wrocław	2nd qual. round	(Montenegro) Rudar Pljevlja	**4–0**	**2–2**
2013–14	Śląsk Wrocław	3rd qual. round	(Belgium) Club Brugge KV	**1–0**	**3–3**
2013–14	Śląsk Wrocław	Play-off round	(Spain) **Sevilla**	**0–5**	**1–4**
2014–15	Lech Poznań	2nd qual. round	(Estonia) Nõmme Kalju	**2–0**	**0–1**
2014–15	Lech Poznań	3rd qual. round	(Iceland) Stjarnan	**0–0**	**0–1**
2014–15	Legia Warsaw	Play-off round	(Kazakhstan) Aktobe	**2–0**	**1–0**
2014–15	Legia Warsaw	Group stage (Group L)	(Belgium) Lokeren	**1–0**	**0–1**
2014–15	Legia Warsaw	Group stage (Group L)	(Ukraine) Metalist Kharkiv	**2–1**	**1–0**
2014–15	Legia Warsaw	Group stage (Group L)	(Turkey) Trabzonspor	**2–0**	**1–0**
2014–15	Legia Warsaw	Round of 32	(Netherlands) Ajax	**0–1**	**0–3**
2014–15	Ruch Chorzów	2nd qual. round	(Liechtenstein) Vaduz	**3–2**	**0–0**
2014–15	Ruch Chorzów	3rd qual. round	(Denmark) Brøndby	**0–0**	**2–2** (a)
2014–15	Ruch Chorzów	Play-off round	(Ukraine) Metalist Kharkiv	**0–0**	**0–1** (a.e.t.)
2014–15	Zawisza Bydgoszcz	2nd qual. round	(Belgium) Zulte Waregem	**1–2**	**1–3**
2015–16	Jagiellonia Białystok	1st qual. round	(Lithuania) Kruoja	**8–0**	**1–0**
2015–16	Jagiellonia Białystok	2nd qual. round	(Cyprus) Omonia	**0–0**	**0–1**
2015–16	Legia Warsaw	2nd qual. round	(Romania) Botoșani	**1–0**	**3–0**
2015–16	Legia Warsaw	3rd qual. round	(Albania) Kukësi	**1–0**	**3–0**
2015–16	Legia Warsaw	Play-off round	(Ukraine) Zorya Luhansk	**3–2**	**1–0**
2015–16	Legia Warsaw	Group stage (Group D)	(Belgium) Club Brugge	**1–1**	**0–1**
2015–16	Legia Warsaw	Group stage (Group D)	(Denmark) Midtjylland	**1–0**	**0–1**
2015–16	Legia Warsaw	Group stage (Group D)	(Italy) Napoli	**0–2**	**2–5**
2015–16	Lech Poznań	Play-off round	(Hungary) Videoton	**3–0**	**1–0**
2015–16	Lech Poznań	Group stage (Group I)	(Switzerland) Basel	**0–1**	**0–2**
2015–16	Lech Poznań	Group stage (Group I)	(Portugal) Belenenses	**0–2**	**0–0**
2015–16	Lech Poznań	Group stage (Group I)	(Italy) Fiorentina	**0–0**	**2–1**
2015–16	Śląsk Wrocław	1st qual. round	(Slovenia) Celje	**3–1**	**1–0**
2015–16	Śląsk Wrocław	2nd qual. round	(Sweden) Göteborg	**0–0**	**0–2**
2016–17	Cracovia	1st qual. round	(North Macedonia) Shkëndija	**1–2**	**0–2**
2016–17	Legia Warsaw	Round of 32	(Netherlands) Ajax	**0–0**	**0–1**
2016–17	Piast Gliwice	2nd qual. round	(Sweden) Göteborg	**0–3**	**0–0**
2016–17	Zagłębie Lubin	1st qual. round	(Bulgaria) Slavia Sofia	**3–0**	**0–1**
2016–17	Zagłębie Lubin	2nd qual. round	(Serbia) Partizan	**0–0** **(4–3** p)	**0–0**
2016–17	Zagłębie Lubin	3rd qual. round	(Denmark) SønderjyskE	**1–2**	**1–1**
2017–18	Arka Gdynia	3rd qual. round	(Denmark) Midtjylland	**3–2**	**1–2** (a)
2017–18	Jagiellonia Białystok	1st qual. round	(Georgia (country)) Dinamo Batumi	**4–0**	**1–0**
2017–18	Jagiellonia Białystok	2nd qual. round	(Azerbaijan) Gabala	**1–1**	**0–2**
2017–18	Lech Poznań	1st qual. round	(North Macedonia) Pelister	**4–0**	**3–0**
2017–18	Lech Poznań	2nd qual. round	(Norway) Haugesund	**2–0**	**2–3**
2017–18	Lech Poznań	3rd qual. round	(Netherlands) Utrecht	**2–2** (a)	**0–0**
2017–18	Legia Warsaw	Play-off round	(Moldova) Sheriff Tiraspol	**1–1**	**0–0** (a)
2018–19	Górnik Zabrze	1st qual. round	(Moldova) Zaria Bǎlți	**1–0**	**1–1**
2018–19	Górnik Zabrze	2nd qual. round	(Slovakia) Trenčín	**0–1**	**1–4**
2018–19	Jagiellonia Białystok	2nd qual. round	(Portugal) Rio Ave	**1–0**	**4–4**
2018–19	Jagiellonia Białystok	3rd qual. round	(Belgium) Gent	**0–1**	**1–3**
2018–19	Lech Poznań	1st qual. round	(Armenia) Gandzasar Kapan	**2–0**	**1–2**
2018–19	Lech Poznań	2nd qual. round	(Belarus) Shakhtyor Soligorsk	**3–1** (a.e.t.)	**1–1**
2018–19	Lech Poznań	3rd qual. round	(Belgium) Genk	**1–2**	**0–2**
2018–19	Legia Warsaw	3rd qual. round	(Luxembourg) F91 Dudelange	**1–2**	**2–2**
2019–20	Cracovia	1st qual. round	(Slovakia) DAC Dunajská Streda	**2–2** (a.e.t.)(a)	**1–1**
2019–20	Lechia Gdańsk	2nd qual. round	(Denmark) Brøndby	**2–1**	**1–4** (a.e.t.)
2019–20	Legia Warsaw	1st qual. round	(Gibraltar) Europa	**3–0**	**0–0**
2019–20	Legia Warsaw	2nd qual. round	(Finland) KuPS	**1–0**	**0–0**
2019–20	Legia Warsaw	3rd qual. round	(Greece) Atromitos	**0–0**	**2–0**
2019–20	Legia Warsaw	Play-off round	(Scotland) Rangers	**0–0**	**0–1**
2019–20	Piast Gliwice	2nd qual. round	(Latvia) Riga	**3–2**	**1–2** (a)
2020–21	Cracovia	1st qual. round	(Sweden) Malmö	—N/a	**0–2**
2020–21	Lech Poznań	1st qual. round	(Latvia) Valmiera	**3–0**	–
2020–21	Lech Poznań	2nd qual. round	(Sweden) Hammarby	–	**3–0**
2020–21	Lech Poznań	3rd qual. round	(Cyprus) Apollon Limassol	–	**5–0**
2020–21	Lech Poznań	Play-off round	(Belgium) Royal Charleroi	–	**2–1**
2020–21	Lech Poznań	Group stage (Group D)	(Portugal) Benfica	**2–4**	**0–4**
2020–21	Lech Poznań	Group stage (Group D)	(Belgium) Standard Liège	**3–1**	**1–2**
2020–21	Lech Poznań	Group stage (Group D)	(Scotland) Rangers	**0–2**	**0–1**
2020–21	Legia Warsaw	3rd qual. round	(Kosovo) Drita	**2–0**	—N/a
2020–21	Legia Warsaw	Play-off round	(Azerbaijan) Qarabağ	**0–3**	—N/a
2020–21	Piast Gliwice	1st qual. round	(Belarus) Dinamo Minsk	—N/a	**2–0**
2020–21	Piast Gliwice	2nd qual. round	(Austria) TSV Hartberg	**3–2**	—N/a
2020–21	Piast Gliwice	3rd qual. round	(Denmark) Copenhagen	—N/a	**0–3**
2021–22	Legia Warsaw	Play-off round	(Czech Republic) Slavia Prague	**2–1**	**2–2**
2021–22	Legia Warsaw	Group stage (Group C)	(England) Leicester City	**1–0**	**1–3**
2021–22	Legia Warsaw	Group stage (Group C)	(Italy) Napoli	**1–4**	**0–3**
2021–22	Legia Warsaw	Group stage (Group C)	(Russia) Spartak Moscow	**0–1**	**1–0**
2022–23	No teams qualified				
2023–24	Raków Częstochowa	Group stage (Group D)	(Italy) **Atalanta**	**0–4**	**0–2**
2023–24	Raków Częstochowa	Group stage (Group D)	(Austria) Sturm Graz	**0–1**	**1–0**
2023–24	Raków Częstochowa	Group stage (Group D)	(Portugal) Sporting	**1–1**	**1–2**
2024–25	Jagiellonia Białystok	Play-off round	(Netherlands) Ajax	**1–4**	**0–3**
2024–25	Wisła Kraków	1st qual. round	(Kosovo) Llapi	**2–0**	**2–1**
2024–25	Wisła Kraków	2nd qual. round	(Austria) Rapid Wien	**1–2**	**1–6**
2025–26	Lech Poznań	Play-off round	(Belgium) Genk	**1–5**	**2–1**
2025–26	Legia Warsaw	1st qual. round	(Kazakhstan) Aktobe	**1–0**	**1–0**
2025–26	Legia Warsaw	2nd qual. round	(Czech Republic) Baník Ostrava	**2–1**	**2–2**
2025–26	Legia Warsaw	3rd qual. round	(Cyprus) AEK Larnaca	**2–1**	**1–4**
2026–27	Górnik Zabrze	3rd qual. round	(Hungary) Ferencváros	**1–1**	**0–1**
2026–27	Jagiellonia Białystok	3rd qual. round	(Scotland) Rangers	**2–1**	**1–1**
2026–27	Jagiellonia Białystok	Play-off round	(Georgia (country)) Iberia 1999	**4–0**	**2–1**
2026–27	Jagiellonia Białystok	League phase	(Greece) Olympiacos	—N/a	**1–2**
2026–27	Jagiellonia Białystok	League phase	Ararat-Armenia	**3–1**	—N/a
2026–27	Jagiellonia Białystok	League phase	(Belgium) Anderlecht	**0–3**	—N/a
2026–27	Jagiellonia Białystok	League phase	(Bulgaria) Levski Sofia	—N/a	**0–1**
2026–27	Jagiellonia Białystok	League phase	(England) Sunderland	—N/a	
2026–27	Jagiellonia Białystok	League phase	(England) Crystal Palace		—N/a
2026–27	Jagiellonia Białystok	League phase	(France) Lyon		—N/a
2026–27	Jagiellonia Białystok	League phase	(Czech Republic) Viktoria Plzeň	—N/a	
2026–27	Lech Poznań	3rd qual. round	(Faroe Islands) KÍ Klaksvík	**1–0**	**5–0**
2026–27	Lech Poznań	Play-off round	(Switzerland) Thun	**7–0**	**2–2**
2026–27	Lech Poznań	League phase	(England) Crystal Palace	—N/a	**0–4**
2026–27	Lech Poznań	League phase	(Germany) Bayer Leverkusen	**0–4**	—N/a
2026–27	Lech Poznań	League phase	(England) Sunderland	**1–1**	—N/a
2026–27	Lech Poznań	League phase	(Portugal) Benfica	—N/a	**1–3**
2026–27	Lech Poznań	League phase	(Belgium) Union Saint-Gilloise	—N/a	
2026–27	Lech Poznań	League phase	(Hungary) Ferencváros		—N/a
2026–27	Lech Poznań	League phase	(Portugal) Torreense		—N/a
2026–27	Lech Poznań	League phase	(Greece) OFI	—N/a	

Bold denotes the competition winner.

=== UEFA Conference League ===
Season	Club	Round	Opponent	Home	Away
2021–22	Pogoń Szczecin	2nd qual. round	(Croatia) Osijek	**0–0**	**0–1**
2021–22	Raków Częstochowa	2nd qual. round	(Lithuania) Sūduva	**0–0** **(4–3** p)	**0–0**
2021–22	Raków Częstochowa	3rd qual. round	(Russia) Rubin Kazan	**0–0**	**1–0** (a.e.t.)
2021–22	Raków Częstochowa	Play-off round	(Belgium) Gent	**1–0**	**0–3**
2021–22	Śląsk Wrocław	1st qual. round	(Estonia) Paide Linnameeskond	**2–0**	**2–1**
2021–22	Śląsk Wrocław	2nd qual. round	(Armenia) Ararat Yerevan	**3–3**	**4–2**
2021–22	Śląsk Wrocław	3rd qual. round	(Israel) Hapoel Be'er Sheva	**2–1**	**0–4**
2022–23	Lech Poznań	2nd qual. round	(Georgia (country)) Dinamo Batumi	**5–0**	**1–1**
2022–23	Lech Poznań	3rd qual. round	(Iceland) Víkingur Reykjavík	**4–1** (a.e.t.)	**0–1**
2022–23	Lech Poznań	Play-off round	(Luxembourg) F91 Dudelange	**2–0**	**1–1**
2022–23	Lech Poznań	Group stage (Group C)	(Spain) Villarreal	**3–0**	**3–4**
2022–23	Lech Poznań	Group stage (Group C)	Austria Wien	**4–1**	**1–1**
2022–23	Lech Poznań	Group stage (Group C)	(Israel) Hapoel Be'er Sheva	**0–0**	**1–1**
2022–23	Lech Poznań	Knockout round play-offs	(Norway) Bodø/Glimt	**1–0**	**0–0**
2022–23	Lech Poznań	Round of 16	(Sweden) Djurgårdens IF	**2–0**	**3–0**
2022–23	Lech Poznań	Quarter-finals	(Italy) Fiorentina	**1–4**	**3–2**
2022–23	Lechia Gdańsk	1st qual. round	(North Macedonia) Akademija Pandev	**4–1**	**2–1**
2022–23	Lechia Gdańsk	2nd qual. round	(Austria) Rapid Wien	**1–2**	**0–0**
2022–23	Pogoń Szczecin	1st qual. round	(Iceland) KR	**4–1**	**0–1**
2022–23	Pogoń Szczecin	2nd qual. round	(Denmark) Brøndby	**1–1**	**0–4**
2022–23	Raków Częstochowa	2nd qual. round	(Kazakhstan) Astana	**5–0**	**1–0**
2022–23	Raków Częstochowa	3rd qual. round	(Slovakia) Spartak Trnava	**1–0**	**2–0**
2022–23	Raków Częstochowa	Play-off round	(Czech Republic) Slavia Prague	**2–1**	**0–2** (a.e.t.)
2023–24	Lech Poznań	2nd qual. round	(Lithuania) Kauno Žalgiris	**3–1**	**2–1**
2023–24	Lech Poznań	3rd qual. round	(Slovakia) Spartak Trnava	**2–1**	**1–3**
2023–24	Legia Warsaw	2nd qual. round	(Kazakhstan) Ordabasy	**3–2**	**2–2**
2023–24	Legia Warsaw	3rd qual. round	Austria Wien	**1–2**	**5–3**
2023–24	Legia Warsaw	Play-off round	(Denmark) Midtjylland	**1–1** **(6–5** p)	**3–3**
2023–24	Legia Warsaw	Group stage (Group E)	(England) Aston Villa	**3–2**	**1–2**
2023–24	Legia Warsaw	Group stage (Group E)	(Netherlands) AZ	**2–0**	**0–1**
2023–24	Legia Warsaw	Group stage (Group E)	(Bosnia and Herzegovina) Zrinjski Mostar	**2–0**	**2–1**
2023–24	Legia Warsaw	Knockout round play-offs	(Norway) Molde	**0–3**	**2–3**
2023–24	Pogoń Szczecin	2nd qual. round	(Northern Ireland) Linfield	**3–2**	**5–2**
2023–24	Pogoń Szczecin	3rd qual. round	(Belgium) Gent	**2–1**	**0–5**
2024–25	Jagiellonia Białystok	League phase	(Denmark) Copenhagen	—N/a	**2–1**
2024–25	Jagiellonia Białystok	League phase	(Norway) Molde	**3–0**	—N/a
2024–25	Jagiellonia Białystok	League phase	(Slovenia) Olimpija Ljubljana	**0–0**	—N/a
2024–25	Jagiellonia Białystok	League phase	(Czech Republic) Mladá Boleslav	—N/a	**0–1**
2024–25	Jagiellonia Białystok	League phase	(Moldova) Petrocub Hîncești	**2–0**	—N/a
2024–25	Jagiellonia Białystok	League phase	(Slovenia) Celje	—N/a	**3–3**
2024–25	Jagiellonia Białystok	Knockout phase play-offs	(Serbia) TSC	**3–1**	**3–1**
2024–25	Jagiellonia Białystok	Round of 16	(Belgium) Cercle Brugge	**3–0**	**0–2**
2024–25	Jagiellonia Białystok	Quarter-finals	(Spain) Real Betis	**1–1**	**0–2**
2024–25	Legia Warsaw	2nd qual. round	(Wales) Caernarfon Town	**6–0**	**5–0**
2024–25	Legia Warsaw	3rd qual. round	(Denmark) Brøndby	**1–1**	**3–2**
2024–25	Legia Warsaw	Play-off round	(Kosovo) Drita	**2–0**	**1–0**
2024–25	Legia Warsaw	League phase	(Spain) Real Betis	**1–0**	—N/a
2024–25	Legia Warsaw	League phase	(Sweden) Djurgårdens IF	—N/a	**1–3**
2024–25	Legia Warsaw	League phase	(Cyprus) Omonia	—N/a	**3–0**
2024–25	Legia Warsaw	League phase	(Switzerland) Lugano	**1–2**	—N/a
2024–25	Legia Warsaw	League phase	(Serbia) TSC	—N/a	**3–0**
2024–25	Legia Warsaw	League phase	(Belarus) Dinamo Minsk	**4–0**	—N/a
2024–25	Legia Warsaw	Round of 16	(Norway) Molde	**2–0** (a.e.t.)	**2–3**
2024–25	Legia Warsaw	Quarter-finals	(England) Chelsea	**0–3**	**2–1**
2024–25	Śląsk Wrocław	2nd qual. round	(Latvia) Riga FC	**3–1**	**0–1**
2024–25	Śląsk Wrocław	3rd qual. round	(Switzerland) St. Gallen	**3–2**	**0–2**
2024–25	Wisła Kraków	3rd qual. round	(Slovakia) Spartak Trnava	**3–1** **(12–11** p)	**1–3**
2024–25	Wisła Kraków	Play-off round	(Belgium) Cercle Brugge	**1–6**	**4–1**
2025–26	Jagiellonia Białystok	2nd qual. round	(Serbia) Novi Pazar	**3–1**	**2–1**
2025–26	Jagiellonia Białystok	3rd qual. round	(Denmark) Silkeborg	**2–2**	**1–0**
2025–26	Jagiellonia Białystok	Play-off round	(Albania) Dinamo City	**3–0**	**1–1**
2025–26	Jagiellonia Białystok	League phase			
2025–26	Jagiellonia Białystok	League phase	(Malta) Ħamrun Spartans	**1–0**	—N/a
2025–26	Jagiellonia Białystok	League phase	(France) Strasbourg	—N/a	**1–1**
2025–26	Jagiellonia Białystok	League phase	(North Macedonia) Shkëndija	—N/a	**1–1**
2025–26	Jagiellonia Białystok	League phase	(Finland) KuPS	**1–0**	—N/a
2025–26	Jagiellonia Białystok	League phase	(Spain) Rayo Vallecano	**1–2**	—N/a
2025–26	Jagiellonia Białystok	League phase	(Netherlands) AZ	—N/a	**0–0**
2025–26	Jagiellonia Białystok	Knockout phase play-offs	(Italy) Fiorentina	**0–3**	**4–2** (a.e.t.)
2025–26	Lech Poznań	League phase			
2025–26	Lech Poznań	League phase	(Austria) Rapid Wien	**4–1**	—N/a
2025–26	Lech Poznań	League phase	(Gibraltar) Lincoln Red Imps	—N/a	**1–2**
2025–26	Lech Poznań	League phase	(Spain) Rayo Vallecano	—N/a	**2–3**
2025–26	Lech Poznań	League phase	(Switzerland) Lausanne-Sport	**2–0**	—N/a
2025–26	Lech Poznań	League phase	(Germany) Mainz 05	**1–1**	—N/a
2025–26	Lech Poznań	League phase	(Czech Republic) Sigma Olomouc	—N/a	**2–1**
2025–26	Lech Poznań	Knockout phase play-offs	(Finland) KuPS	**1–0**	**2–0**
2025–26	Lech Poznań	Round of 16	(Ukraine) Shakhtar Donetsk	**1–3**	**2–1**
2025–26	Legia Warsaw	Play-off round	(Scotland) Hibernian	**3–3 (a.e.t.)**	**2–1**
2025–26	Legia Warsaw	League phase			
2025–26	Legia Warsaw	League phase	(Turkey) Samsunspor	**0–1**	—N/a
2025–26	Legia Warsaw	League phase	(Ukraine) Shakhtar Donetsk	—N/a	**2–1**
2025–26	Legia Warsaw	League phase	(Slovenia) Celje	—N/a	**1–2**
2025–26	Legia Warsaw	League phase	(Czech Republic) Sparta Prague	**0–1**	—N/a
2025–26	Legia Warsaw	League phase	(Armenia) Noah	—N/a	**1–2**
2025–26	Legia Warsaw	League phase	(Gibraltar) Lincoln Red Imps	**4–1**	—N/a
2025–26	Raków Częstochowa	2nd qual. round	(Slovakia) Žilina	**3–0**	**3–1**
2025–26	Raków Częstochowa	3rd qual. round	(Israel) Maccabi Haifa	**0–1**	**2–0**
2025–26	Raków Częstochowa	Play-off round	(Bulgaria) Arda	**1–0**	**2–1**
2025–26	Raków Częstochowa	League phase			
2025–26	Raków Częstochowa	League phase	(Romania) Universitatea Craiova	**2–0**	—N/a
2025–26	Raków Częstochowa	League phase	(Czech Republic) Sigma Olomouc	—N/a	**1–1**
2025–26	Raków Częstochowa	League phase	(Czech Republic) Sparta Prague	—N/a	**0–0**
2025–26	Raków Częstochowa	League phase	(Austria) Rapid Wien	**4–1**	—N/a
2025–26	Raków Częstochowa	League phase	(Bosnia and Herzegovina) Zrinjski Mostar	**1–0**	—N/a
2025–26	Raków Częstochowa	League phase	(Cyprus) Omonia	—N/a	**1–0**
2025–26	Raków Częstochowa	Round of 16	(Italy) Fiorentina	**1–2**	**1–2**
2026–27	GKS Katowice	2nd qual. round	(Slovakia) Žilina	**3–1**	**1–2**
2026–27	GKS Katowice	3rd qual. round	(Israel) Hapoel Tel Aviv	**2–1**	**0–2**
2026–27	Górnik Zabrze	Play-off round	(France) Monaco	**2–3**	**1–4**
2026–27	Raków Częstochowa	2nd qual. round	(Malta) Valletta	**3–1**	**4–0**
2026–27	Raków Częstochowa	3rd qual. round	(Sweden) Hammarby IF	**0–0**	**1–0**
2026–27	Raków Częstochowa	Play-off round	(Croatia) Hajduk Split	**2–3** (a.e.t.)	**2–2**

Bold denotes the competition winner.

=== UEFA Cup Winners' Cup ===
Season	Club	Round	Opponent	Home	Away
1960–61	Did not participate				
1961–62	Did not participate				
1962–63	Zagłębie Sosnowiec	Preliminary round	(Hungary) Újpesti Dózsa	**0–0**	**0–5**
1963–64	Zagłębie Sosnowiec	1st round	(Greece) Olympiacos	**1–0**	**1–2,** **0–2**
1964–65	Legia Warsaw	1st round	(Austria) Admira Wien	**1–0**	**3–1**
1964–65	Legia Warsaw	2nd round	(Turkey) Galatasaray	**3–1, 1–0**	**0–1**
1964–65	Legia Warsaw	Quarter-finals	(West Germany) TSV 1860 Munich	**0–4**	**0–0**
1965–66	Did not participate				
1966–67	Legia Warsaw	1st round	(East Germany) BSG Chemie Leipzig	**2–2**	**0–3**
1967–68	Wisła Kraków	1st round	(Finland) HJK Helsinki	**4–0**	**4–1**
1967–68	Wisła Kraków	2nd round	(West Germany) Hamburger SV	**0–1**	**0–4**
1968–69	Górnik Zabrze	1st round	Withdrawn		
1969–70	Górnik Zabrze	1st round	(Greece) Olympiacos	**5–0**	**2–2**
1969–70	Górnik Zabrze	2nd round	(Scotland) Rangers	**3–1**	**3–1**
1969–70	Górnik Zabrze	Quarter-finals	(Bulgaria) Levski-Spartak	**2–1**	**2–3** (a)
1969–70	Górnik Zabrze	Semi-finals	(Italy) Roma	**2–2** (a.e.t.)	**1–1**, **2–2** (a.e.t.) (c)
1969–70	Górnik Zabrze	Final	(England) **Manchester City**	**1–2**	
1970–71	Górnik Zabrze	1st round	(Denmark) AaB	**8–1**	**1–0**
1970–71	Górnik Zabrze	2nd round	(Turkey) Göztepe	**3–0**	**1–0**
1970–71	Górnik Zabrze	Quarter-finals	(England) Manchester City	**2–0**	**0–2,** **1–3**
1971–72	Zagłębie Sosnowiec	1st round	(Sweden) Åtvidabergs FF	**3–4**	**1–1**
1972–73	Legia Warsaw	1st round	(Iceland) Víkingur	**9–0**	**2–0**
1972–73	Legia Warsaw	2nd round	(Italy) **Milan**	**1–1**	**1–2** (a.e.t.)
1973–74	Legia Warsaw	1st round	(Greece) PAOK	**1–1**	**0–1**
1974–75	Gwardia Warsaw	1st round	(Italy) Bologna	**2–1**	**1–2** **(5–3** p)
1974–75	Gwardia Warsaw	2nd round	(Netherlands) PSV Eindhoven	**1–5**	**0–3**
1975–76	Stal Rzeszów	1st round	(Norway) Skeid	**4–0**	**4–1**
1975–76	Stal Rzeszów	2nd round	(Wales) Wrexham	**1–1**	**0–2**
1976–77	Śląsk Wrocław	1st round	(Malta) Floriana	**2–0**	**4–1**
1976–77	Śląsk Wrocław	2nd round	(Republic of Ireland) Bohemians	**3–0**	**1–0**
1976–77	Śląsk Wrocław	Quarter-finals	(Italy) Napoli	**0–0**	**0–2**
1977–78	Zagłębie Sosnowiec	1st round	(Greece) PAOK	**0–2**	**0–2**
1978–79	Zagłębie Sosnowiec	1st round	(Austria) SSW Innsbruck	**2–3**	**1–1**
1979–80	Arka Gdynia	1st round	(Bulgaria) Beroe Stara Zagora	**3–2**	**0–2**
1980–81	Legia Warsaw	1st round	(Bulgaria) Slavia Sofia	**1–0**	**1–3**
1981–82	Legia Warsaw	1st round	(Norway) Vålerenga	**4–1**	**2–2**
1981–82	Legia Warsaw	2nd round	(Switzerland) Lausanne-Sport	**2–1**	**1–1**
1981–82	Legia Warsaw	Quarter-finals	(Soviet Union) Dinamo Tbilisi	**0–1**	**0–1**
1982–83	Lech Poznań	1st round	(Iceland) ÍBV-íþróttafélag	**3–0**	**1–0**
1982–83	Lech Poznań	2nd round	(Scotland) **Aberdeen**	**0–1**	**0–2**
1983–84	Lechia Gdańsk	1st round	(Italy) **Juventus**	**2–3**	**0–7**
1984–85	Wisła Kraków	1st round	(Iceland) ÍBV-íþróttafélag	**4–2**	**3–1**
1984–85	Wisła Kraków	2nd round	(Netherlands) Fortuna Sittard	**2–1**	**0–2**
1985–86	Widzew Łódź	1st round	(Turkey) Galatasaray	**2–1** (a)	**0–1**
1986–87	GKS Katowice	1st round	(Iceland) Fram	**1–0**	**3–0**
1986–87	GKS Katowice	2nd round	(Switzerland) Sion	**2–2**	**0–3**
1987–88	Śląsk Wrocław	1st round	(Spain) Real Sociedad	**0–2**	**0–0**
1988–89	Lech Poznań	1st round	(Albania) Flamurtari Vlorë	**1–0**	**3–2**
1988–89	Lech Poznań	2nd round	(Spain) **Barcelona**	**1–1** **(4–5** p)	**1–1**
1989–90	Legia Warsaw	1st round	(Spain) Barcelona	**0–1**	**1–1**
1990–91	Legia Warsaw	1st round	(Luxembourg) Swift Hesperange	**3–0**	**3–0**
1990–91	Legia Warsaw	2nd round	(Scotland) Aberdeen	**1–0**	**0–0**
1990–91	Legia Warsaw	Quarter-finals	(Italy) Sampdoria	**1–0**	**2–2**
1990–91	Legia Warsaw	Semi-finals	(England) **Manchester United**	**1–3**	**1–1**
1991–92	GKS Katowice	1st round	(Scotland) Motherwell	**2–0**	**1–3** (a)
1991–92	GKS Katowice	2nd round	(Belgium) Club Brugge	**0–1**	**0–3**
1992–93	Miedź Legnica	1st round	(France) AS Monaco	**0–1**	**0–0**
1993–94	GKS Katowice	1st round	(Portugal) Benfica	**1–1**	**0–1**
1994–95	ŁKS Łódź	1st round	(Portugal) Porto	**0–1**	**0–2**
1995–96	GKS Katowice	Qualifying round	(Armenia) Ararat Yerevan	**2–0**	**0–2 (4–5** p)
1996–97	Ruch Chorzów	Qualifying round	(Wales) TNS	**5–0**	**1–1**
1996–97	Ruch Chorzów	1st round	(Portugal) Benfica	**0–0**	**1–5**
1997–98	Legia Warsaw	Qualifying round	(Northern Ireland) Glenavon	**4–0**	**1–1**
1997–98	Legia Warsaw	1st round	(Italy) Vicenza	**1–1**	**0–2**
1998–99	Amica Wronki	Qualifying round	(Malta) Hibernians	**4–0**	**1–0**
1998–99	Amica Wronki	1st round	(Netherlands) Heerenveen	**0–1**	**1–3**

Bold denotes the competition winner.

=== UEFA Intertoto Cup ===
==== Non-UEFA ====
Season	Club	Round	Opponent	Home	Away
Group stages with knockout rounds (until 1966–67)
1961–62	Górnik Zabrze	Group stage (Group A3)	(East Germany) Berliner FC Dynamo	**5–1**	**3–4**
1961–62	Górnik Zabrze	Group stage (Group A3)	(Czechoslovakia) DSO Spartak Hradec Králové	**2–2**	**3–2**
1961–62	Górnik Zabrze	Group stage (Group A3)	(Austria) Wiener Sport-Club	**2–5**	**2–0**
1961–62	Odra Opole	Group stage (Group A1)	(Czechoslovakia) Slovan CHZJD Bratislava	**1–1**	**1–8**
1961–62	Odra Opole	Group stage (Group A1)	(East Germany) ASK Vorwärts Berlin	**2–1**	**1–2**
1961–62	Odra Opole	Group stage (Group A1)	(Austria) Wiener AC	**2–0**	**1–4**
1962–63	Did not participate				
1963–64	Odra Opole	Group stage (Group C4)	(Socialist Federal Republic of Yugoslavia) HNK Hajduk Split	**1–0**	**0–1**
1963–64	Odra Opole	Group stage (Group C4)	(Czechoslovakia) TJ SONP Kladno	**4–0**	**1–1**
1963–64	Odra Opole	Group stage (Group C4)	(East Germany) BSG Motor Zwickau	**1–0**	**1–1**
1963–64	Odra Opole	1st round	(Sweden) IFK Norrköping	**3–2**	**2–0**
1963–64	Odra Opole	Quarter-finals	(Czechoslovakia) Slovan CHZJD Bratislava	**1–1**	**0–0** (c)
1963–64	Odra Opole	Semi-finals	(Poland) Polonia Bytom	**0–0**	**1–2**
1963–64	Polonia Bytom	Group stage (Group C3)	(Czechoslovakia) Jednota Trenčín	**2–2**	**3–0**
1963–64	Polonia Bytom	Group stage (Group C3)	(Socialist Federal Republic of Yugoslavia) Red Star Belgrade	**6–1**	**3–4**
1963–64	Polonia Bytom	Group stage (Group C3)	(East Germany) ASK Vorwärts Berlin	**2–2**	**1–1**
1963–64	Polonia Bytom	1st round	(Italy) U.C. Sampdoria	**1–1**	**2–0**
1963–64	Polonia Bytom	Quarter-finals	(Sweden) Örgryte IS	**3–2**	**7–1**
1963–64	Polonia Bytom	Semi-finals	(Poland) Odra Opole	**2–1**	**0–0**
1963–64	Polonia Bytom	Final	(Czechoslovakia) **TJ Slovnaft Bratislava**	**0–1**	
1963–64	Ruch Chorzów	Group stage (Group C2)	(East Germany) SC Empor Rostock	**3–1**	**1–1**
1963–64	Ruch Chorzów	Group stage (Group C2)	(Socialist Federal Republic of Yugoslavia) OFK Beograd	**3–0**	**1–2**
1963–64	Ruch Chorzów	Group stage (Group C2)	(Czechoslovakia) Slovan CHZJD Bratislava	**3–0**	**1–4**
1963–64	Zagłębie Sosnowiec	Group stage (Group C1)	(East Germany) SC Motor Jena	**2–0**	**0–2**
1963–64	Zagłębie Sosnowiec	Group stage (Group C1)	(Czechoslovakia) **TJ Slovnaft Bratislava**	**1–0**	**0–1**
1963–64	Zagłębie Sosnowiec	Group stage (Group C1)	(Socialist Federal Republic of Yugoslavia) FK Velež Mostar	**4–1**	**1–4**
1964–65	Gwardia Warsaw	Group stage (Group B2)	(East Germany) SC Empor Rostock	**4–1**	**1–5**
1964–65	Gwardia Warsaw	Group stage (Group B2)	(Sweden) IFK Norrköping	**1–5**	**3–1**
1964–65	Gwardia Warsaw	Group stage (Group B2)	(Socialist Federal Republic of Yugoslavia) FK Radnički Niš	**4–2**	**1–5**
1964–65	Odra Opole	Group stage (Group B4)	(East Germany) SC Karl-Marx-Stadt	**1–2**	**2–0**
1964–65	Odra Opole	Group stage (Group B4)	(Bulgaria) PFC Spartak Pleven	**1–0**	**1–1**
1964–65	Odra Opole	Group stage (Group B4)	(Czechoslovakia) TJ Tatran Prešov	**0–2**	**1–1**
1964–65	**Polonia Bytom**	Group stage (Group C3)	(Sweden) Degerfors IF	**6–0**	**1–1**
1964–65	**Polonia Bytom**	Group stage (Group C3)	(France) RC Lens	**4–0**	**1–3**
1964–65	**Polonia Bytom**	Group stage (Group C3)	(West Germany) FC Schalke 04	**6–0**	**0–2**
1964–65	**Polonia Bytom**	1st round	Bye		
1964–65	**Polonia Bytom**	Quarter-finals	(East Germany) SC Karl-Marx-Stadt	**4–1**	**0–2**
1964–65	**Polonia Bytom**	Semi-finals	(Belgium) RFC de Liège	**3–1**	**0–1**
1964–65	**Polonia Bytom**	Final	(East Germany) SC Leipzig	**5–1**	**0–3**
1964–65	Szombierki Bytom	Group stage (Group B3)	(Czechoslovakia) TJ VSS Košice	**3–0**	**2–4**
1964–65	Szombierki Bytom	Group stage (Group B3)	(East Germany) ASK Vorwärts Berlin	**2–0**	**0–2**
1964–65	Szombierki Bytom	Group stage (Group B3)	(Austria) Wiener Sport-Club	**3–1**	**3–2**
1964–65	Szombierki Bytom	1st round	(Belgium) RFC de Liège	**0–1**	**0–0**
1965–66	Gwardia Warsaw	Group stage (Group B3)	(Czechoslovakia) TJ Baník Ostrava	**1–5**	**2–1**
1965–66	Gwardia Warsaw	Group stage (Group B3)	(East Germany) **SC Leipzig**	**3–2**	**1–2**
1965–66	Gwardia Warsaw	Group stage (Group B3)	(Socialist Federal Republic of Yugoslavia) FK Željezničar Sarajevo	**2–1**	**1–2**
1965–66	Pogoń Szczecin	Group stage (Group B4)	(East Germany) BSG Chemie Leipzig	**1–2**	**0–1**
1965–66	Pogoń Szczecin	Group stage (Group B4)	(Czechoslovakia) TJ Internacionál Slovnaft Bratislava	**1–3**	**0–4**
1965–66	Pogoń Szczecin	Group stage (Group B4)	(Socialist Federal Republic of Yugoslavia) NK Zagreb	**3–0**	**0–2**
1965–66	Szombierki Bytom	Group stage (Group B1)	(Socialist Federal Republic of Yugoslavia) NK Rijeka	**0–1**	**3–0**
1965–66	Szombierki Bytom	Group stage (Group B1)	(East Germany) SC Motor Jena	**3–1**	**0–2**
1965–66	Szombierki Bytom	Group stage (Group B1)	(Czechoslovakia) TJ Tatran Prešov	**0–1**	**0–1**
1965–66	Zagłębie Sosnowiec	Group stage (Group B2)	(Czechoslovakia) TJ VSS Košice	**3–0**	**3–4**
1965–66	Zagłębie Sosnowiec	Group stage (Group B2)	(Socialist Federal Republic of Yugoslavia) FK Radnički Niš	**5–2**	**0–0**
1965–66	Zagłębie Sosnowiec	Group stage (Group B2)	(East Germany) SC Empor Rostock	**2–1**	**0–3**
1966–67	Górnik Zabrze	Group stage (Group B3)	(Sweden) AIK Fotboll	**3–2**	**1–1**
1966–67	Górnik Zabrze	Group stage (Group B3)	(East Germany) FC Carl Zeiss Jena	**2–0**	**5–1**
1966–67	Górnik Zabrze	Group stage (Group B3)	(West Germany) Eintracht Braunschweig	**2–4**	**4–2**
1966–67	Polonia Bytom	Group stage (Group B6)	(East Germany) Dynamo Dresden	**0–0**	**1–7**
1966–67	Polonia Bytom	Group stage (Group B6)	(Sweden) IFK Norrköping	**3–1**	**1–5**
1966–67	Polonia Bytom	Group stage (Group B6)	(Czechoslovakia) DSO Spartak Hradec Králové	**0–0**	**0–0**
1966–67	Szombierki Bytom	Group stage (Group B2)	(Sweden) IFK Göteborg	**8–0**	**0–4**
1966–67	Szombierki Bytom	Group stage (Group B2)	(East Germany) Lokomotive Leipzig	**1–2**	**1–2**
1966–67	Szombierki Bytom	Group stage (Group B2)	(Czechoslovakia) TJ Sklo Union Teplice	**5–1**	**2–0**
1966–67	Wisła Kraków	Group stage (Group B4)	(Czechoslovakia) TJ Internacionál Slovnaft Bratislava	**3–2**	**0–3**
1966–67	Wisła Kraków	Group stage (Group B4)	(West Germany) 1. FC Kaiserslautern	**1–2**	**4–2**
1966–67	Wisła Kraków	Group stage (Group B4)	(Sweden) Malmö FF	**4–0**	**1–1**
1966–67	Zagłębie Sosnowiec	Group stage (Group B1)	(East Germany) FC Hansa Rostock	**6–2**	**0–3**
1966–67	Zagłębie Sosnowiec	Group stage (Group B1)	(West Germany) Karlsruher SC	**2–1**	**1–0**
1966–67	Zagłębie Sosnowiec	Group stage (Group B1)	(Socialist Federal Republic of Yugoslavia) NK Olimpija Ljubljana	**2–1**	**3–0**
1966–67	Zagłębie Sosnowiec	Quarter-finals	(Netherlands) AFC DWS	**3–0**	**2–2**
1966–67	Zagłębie Sosnowiec	Semi-finals	(West Germany) **Eintracht Frankfurt**	**4–1**	**1–6**
Only Group stages (1967–1994)
1967	GKS Katowice	Group B7	(Denmark) **Kjøbenhavns Boldklub**	**0–1**	**2–3**
1967	GKS Katowice	Group B7	(East Germany) 1. FC Union Berlin	**1–0**	**0–3**
1967	GKS Katowice	Group B7	(Czechoslovakia) TJ Sklo Union Teplice	**0–2**	**1–3**
1967	**Polonia Bytom**	Group B3	(Sweden) IF Elfsborg	**3–0**	**2–1**
1967	**Polonia Bytom**	Group B3	(Switzerland) Grasshopper Club Zurich	**5–1**	**4–1**
1967	**Polonia Bytom**	Group B3	(West Germany) SV Werder Bremen	**2–1**	**0–2**
1967	**Ruch Chorzów**	Group B5	(Austria) First Vienna FC	**2–0**	**3–1**
1967	**Ruch Chorzów**	Group B5	(Denmark) Boldklubben Frem	**5–1**	**2–1**
1967	**Ruch Chorzów**	Group B5	(Switzerland) BSC Young Boys	**4–3**	**2–0**
1967	**Zagłębie Sosnowiec**	Group B2	(Sweden) Djurgårdens IF Fotboll	**4–1**	**2–1**
1967	**Zagłębie Sosnowiec**	Group B2	(West Germany) FC Schalke 04	**1–0**	**0–1**
1967	**Zagłębie Sosnowiec**	Group B2	(Austria) FC Wacker Innsbruck	**4–3**	**3–1**
1968	GKS Katowice	Group B2	(East Germany) **FC Hansa Rostock**	**0–1**	**0–2**
1968	GKS Katowice	Group B2	(Switzerland) FC La Chaux-de-Fonds	**2–1**	**0–1**
1968	GKS Katowice	Group B2	(Sweden) Örebro SK	**1–0**	**1–0**
1968	**Legia Warsaw**	Group B8	(Switzerland) AC Bellinzona	**4–0**	**1–1**
1968	**Legia Warsaw**	Group B8	(Denmark) Boldklubben Frem	**4–0**	**2–1**
1968	**Legia Warsaw**	Group B8	(West Germany) Hannover 96	**2–2**	**3–2**
1968	**Odra Opole**	Group B6	(Denmark) Hvidovre IF	**2–0**	**2–1**
1968	**Odra Opole**	Group B6	(Czechoslovakia) Jednota Trenčín	**2–0**	**0–0**
1968	**Odra Opole**	Group B6	(East Germany) 1. FC Magdeburg	**1–0**	**2–0**
1968	Szombierki Bytom	Group B4	(Sweden) Djurgårdens IF Fotboll	**3–1**	**2–4**
1968	Szombierki Bytom	Group B4	(Czechoslovakia) **TJ VSS Košice**	**3–2**	**0–2**
1968	Szombierki Bytom	Group B4	(West Germany) SV Werder Bremen	**2–0**	**2–0**
1969	**Odra Opole**	Group 9	(Denmark) Boldklubben 1913	**2–0**	**1–2**
1969	**Odra Opole**	Group 9	(Belgium) K.S.K. Beveren	**2–0**	**0–0**
1969	**Odra Opole**	Group 9	(Switzerland) FC La Chaux-de-Fonds	**3–0**	**2–3**
1969	**Szombierki Bytom**	Group 2	(Netherlands) Go Ahead	**1–0**	**2–2**
1969	**Szombierki Bytom**	Group 2	(Switzerland) AC Lugano	**11–0**	**0–0**
1969	**Szombierki Bytom**	Group 2	(Sweden) Östers IF	**2–1**	**1–3**
1969	**Wisła Kraków**	Group 8	(Denmark) Esbjerg fB	**2–1**	**1–0**
1969	**Wisła Kraków**	Group 8	(Czechoslovakia) TJ VSS Košice	**4–0**	**0–4**
1969	**Wisła Kraków**	Group 8	(Belgium) Lierse S.K.	**2–1**	**1–1**
1969	Zagłębie Sosnowiec	Group 3	(Sweden) Djurgårdens IF Fotboll	**3–0**	**1–2**
1969	Zagłębie Sosnowiec	Group 3	(West Germany) **SpVgg Fürth**	**1–0**	**0–0**
1969	Zagłębie Sosnowiec	Group 3	(Austria) Wiener Sport-Club	**3–1**	**0–3**
1970	Gwardia Warsaw	Group B7	(Denmark) AaB	**7–1**	**1–1**
1970	Gwardia Warsaw	Group B7	(Czechoslovakia) **TJ Baník Ostrava OKD**	**1–1**	**0–1**
1970	Gwardia Warsaw	Group B7	(Austria) SV Wattens	**3–0**	**5–1**
1970	**Polonia Bytom**	Group B8	(Denmark) AC Horsens	**2–2**	**1–1**
1970	**Polonia Bytom**	Group B8	(West Germany) Rot-Weiss Essen	**3–2**	**1–1**
1970	**Polonia Bytom**	Group B8	(Austria) FC Wacker Innsbruck	**1–0**	**3–2**
1970	**Wisła Kraków**	Group B5	(Denmark) Hvidovre IF	**1–0**	**1–0**
1970	**Wisła Kraków**	Group B5	(Netherlands) F.C. Utrecht	**1–0**	**0–1**
1970	**Wisła Kraków**	Group B5	(Switzerland) FC Winterthur	**5–1**	**3–1**
1970	Zagłębie Sosnowiec	Group B3	(Sweden) AIK Fotboll	**2–1**	**1–2**
1970	Zagłębie Sosnowiec	Group B3	(Switzerland) FC Lausanne-Sport	**3–1**	**1–1**
1970	Zagłębie Sosnowiec	Group B3	(France) **Olympique de Marseille**	**3–2**	**1–3**
1971	ROW Rybnik	Group 5	(Sweden) **Åtvidabergs FF**	**1–1**	**1–4**
1971	ROW Rybnik	Group 5	(West Germany) Borussia Dortmund	**2–1**	**2–1**
1971	ROW Rybnik	Group 5	(Austria) FC Wacker Innsbruck	**1–3**	**1–0**
1971	**Stal Mielec**	Group 2	(Sweden) IF Elfsborg	**4–0**	**1–0**
1971	**Stal Mielec**	Group 2	(Czechoslovakia) TJ Tatran Prešov	**3–0**	**1–0**
1971	**Stal Mielec**	Group 2	(Denmark) Vejle Boldklub	**3–1**	**3–2**
1971	Szombierki Bytom	Group 3	(Denmark) Boldklubben 1903	**3–0**	**4–1**
1971	Szombierki Bytom	Group 3	(Austria) Linzer ASK	**4–1**	**2–2**
1971	Szombierki Bytom	Group 3	(Switzerland) **Servette FC**	**0–1**	**0–2**
1971	Zagłębie Wałbrzych	Group 6	(West Germany) **Eintracht Braunschweig**	**0–1**	**0–1**
1971	Zagłębie Wałbrzych	Group 6	(Sweden) Malmö FF	**2–0**	**0–4**
1971	Zagłębie Wałbrzych	Group 6	(Switzerland) BSC Young Boys	**1–0**	**0–2**
1972	Górnik Wałbrzych	Group 2	SV Austria Salzburg	**0–1**	**0–2**
1972	Górnik Wałbrzych	Group 2	(Sweden) **IFK Norrköping**	**0–2**	**1–1**
1972	Górnik Wałbrzych	Group 2	(Switzerland) FC Winterthur	**0–0**	**2–3**
1972	Odra Opole	Group 8	(Denmark) Boldklubben Frem	**4–0**	**1–2**
1972	Odra Opole	Group 8	(West Germany) Rot-Weiß Oberhausen	**4–3**	**0–1**
1972	Odra Opole	Group 8	(Austria) **SK VÖEST Linz**	**2–0**	**0–2**
1972	Stal Mielec	Group 7	(West Germany) **Hannover 96**	**3–2**	**1–4**
1972	Stal Mielec	Group 7	(Denmark) Hvidovre IF	**5–0**	**2–1**
1972	Stal Mielec	Group 7	(Switzerland) Grasshopper Club Zurich	**1–4**	**1–1**
1972	Wisła Kraków	Group 3	(Sweden) Åtvidabergs FF	**1–1**	**2–0**
1972	Wisła Kraków	Group 3	(France) **AS Saint-Étienne**	**0–1**	**0–0**
1972	Wisła Kraków	Group 3	(Switzerland) BSC Young Boys	**8–0**	**1–1**
1973	Polonia Bytom	Group 10	SV Austria Salzburg	**4–1**	**1–7**
1973	Polonia Bytom	Group 10	(Denmark) B 1901	**6–2**	**2–0**
1973	Polonia Bytom	Group 10	(Sweden) **Östers IF**	**1–2**	**2–3**
1973	**ROW Rybnik**	Group 5	(Switzerland) AC Lugano	**3–0**	**4–0**
1973	**ROW Rybnik**	Group 5	(Sweden) Örebro SK	**3–1**	**1–2**
1973	**ROW Rybnik**	Group 5	(Austria) SK VÖEST Linz	**3–1**	**2–2**
1973	**Wisła Kraków**	Group 8	(Denmark) Boldklubben 1903	**3–3**	**3–1**
1973	**Wisła Kraków**	Group 8	(West Germany) Kickers Offenbach	**1–1**	**2–0**
1973	**Wisła Kraków**	Group 8	(Austria) SSW Innsbruck	**3–2**	**0–1**
1974	Górnik Zabrze	Group 7	(West Germany) **MSV Duisburg**	**3–3**	**1–6**
1974	Górnik Zabrze	Group 7	(Denmark) Hvidovre IF	**3–0**	**2–2**
1974	Górnik Zabrze	Group 7	(Switzerland) FC Winterthur	**1–3**	**4–3**
1974	Legia Warsaw	Group 8	(Czechoslovakia) **TJ Baník Ostrava OKD**	**1–1**	**1–1**
1974	Legia Warsaw	Group 8	(Sweden) IFK Norrköping	**2–0**	**1–2**
1974	Legia Warsaw	Group 8	(Denmark) Vejle Boldklub	**2–0**	**4–0**
1974	ŁKS Łódź	Group 9	(Czechoslovakia) **TJ VSS Košice**	**1–3**	**1–1**
1974	ŁKS Łódź	Group 9	(Denmark) Randers Freja	**1–1**	**0–5**
1974	ŁKS Łódź	Group 9	(Austria) SK Sturm Graz	**1–0**	**4–3**
1974	Wisła Kraków	Group 6	(Sweden) AIK Fotboll	**1–0**	**3–0**
1974	Wisła Kraków	Group 6	(Czechoslovakia) **FC Spartak Trnava**	**2–2**	**0–0**
1974	Wisła Kraków	Group 6	(Austria) SK VÖEST Linz	**1–1**	**0–2**
1975	Polonia Bytom	Group 5	(Sweden) AIK Fotboll	**5–1**	**2–0**
1975	Polonia Bytom	Group 5	(West Germany) Tennis Borussia Berlin	**3–0**	**1–1**
1975	Polonia Bytom	Group 5	(Czechoslovakia) **FC Zbrojovka Brno**	**1–2**	**1–2**
1975	**ROW Rybnik**	Group 6	(Netherlands) AZ	**2–2**	**0–0**
1975	**ROW Rybnik**	Group 6	(Switzerland) Grasshopper Club Zurich	**1–0**	**2–0**
1975	**ROW Rybnik**	Group 6	(Sweden) Östers IF	**2–1**	**1–0**
1975	Śląsk Wrocław	Group 7	(Austria) FC Admira Wacker	**3–0**	**1–2**
1975	Śląsk Wrocław	Group 7	(Sweden) **Åtvidabergs FF**	**1–0**	**1–3**
1975	Śląsk Wrocław	Group 7	(West Germany) MSV Duisburg	**0–0**	**1–2**
1975	**Zagłębie Sosnowiec**	Group 4	(Denmark) Holbæk B&I	**2–1**	**2–0**
1975	**Zagłębie Sosnowiec**	Group 4	(Austria) SK Sturm Graz	**6–0**	**1–1**
1975	**Zagłębie Sosnowiec**	Group 4	(Netherlands) SC Telstar	**1–0**	**0–0**
1976	Pogoń Szczecin	Group 8	(Portugal) C.F. Os Belenenses	**2–2**	**0–2**
1976	Pogoń Szczecin	Group 8	(Denmark) Næstved BK	**3–0**	**1–1**
1976	Pogoń Szczecin	Group 8	(Sweden) **Östers IF**	**0–1**	**0–1**
1976	ROW Rybnik	Group 9	(Sweden) **Djurgårdens IF Fotboll**	**5–2**	**0–3**
1976	ROW Rybnik	Group 9	(Austria) SK Sturm Graz	**1–3**	**1–2**
1976	ROW Rybnik	Group 9	(Switzerland) FC St. Gallen	**2–0**	**1–4**
1976	**Widzew Łódź**	Group 11	(Denmark) Kjøbenhavns Boldklub	**9–1**	**3–1**
1976	**Widzew Łódź**	Group 11	(Czechoslovakia) TJ VSS Košice	**2–0**	**1–0**
1976	**Widzew Łódź**	Group 11	(Norway) IK Start	**1–0**	**5–3**
1976	Zagłębie Sosnowiec	Group 10	(Sweden) Örebro SK	**5–1**	**1–1**
1976	Zagłębie Sosnowiec	Group 10	(Socialist Federal Republic of Yugoslavia) **FK Vojvodina**	**1–2**	**1–2**
1976	Zagłębie Sosnowiec	Group 10	(Austria) SK VÖEST Linz	**1–1**	**2–1**
1977	Legia Warsaw	Group 5	(Sweden) Landskrona BoIS	**1–0**	**2–1**
1977	Legia Warsaw	Group 5	(Czechoslovakia) **Slavia Prague**	**2–2**	**1–1**
1977	Legia Warsaw	Group 5	(Switzerland) BSC Young Boys	**4–1**	**1–1**
1977	**Pogoń Szczecin**	Group 10	(Switzerland) CS Chênois	**6–1**	**1–0**
1977	**Pogoń Szczecin**	Group 10	(Denmark) Kjøbenhavns Boldklub	**2–2**	**1–1**
1977	**Pogoń Szczecin**	Group 10	(Austria) SK Sturm Graz	**1–0**	**0–0**
1977	Ruch Chorzów	Group 6	(Denmark) **Boldklubben Frem**	**2–1**	**0–3**
1977	Ruch Chorzów	Group 6	(Austria) GAK	**5–0**	**4–0**
1977	Ruch Chorzów	Group 6	(Socialist Federal Republic of Yugoslavia) NK Rijeka	**2–4**	**1–0**
1977	Zagłębie Sosnowiec	Group 7	(Czechoslovakia) **Jednota Trenčín**	**2–0**	**0–3**
1977	Zagłębie Sosnowiec	Group 7	(Austria) Linzer ASK	**3–0**	**3–1**
1977	Zagłębie Sosnowiec	Group 7	(Norway) Lillestrøm SK	**3–0**	**2–0**
1978	Did not participate				
1979	GKS Katowice	Group 7	(Denmark) Aarhus Gymnastikforening	**1–0**	**0–0**
1979	GKS Katowice	Group 7	(Austria) SV Casino Salzburg	**0–0**	**1–1**
1979	GKS Katowice	Group 7	(Bulgaria) **FC Pirin Blagoevgrad**	**3–0** (wo)	**0–3**
1980	Polonia Bytom	Group 5	(Denmark) Esbjerg fB	**0–1**	**2–1**
1980	Polonia Bytom	Group 5	(Austria) Linzer ASK	**1–1**	**0–2**
1980	Polonia Bytom	Group 5	(Czechoslovakia) **TJ Plastika Nitra**	**1–0**	**0–4**
1981	Did not participate				
1982	Gwardia Warsaw	Group 6	(Czechoslovakia) **Bohemians 1905**	**0–1**	**0–1**
1982	Gwardia Warsaw	Group 6	(Austria) Linzer ASK	**1–0**	**3–2**
1982	Gwardia Warsaw	Group 6	(Switzerland) BSC Young Boys	**2–2**	**1–2**
1982	ŁKS Łódź	Group 8	(Sweden) **Östers IF**	**1–1**	**3–4**
1982	ŁKS Łódź	Group 8	(Czechoslovakia) FC Zbrojovka Brno	**0–0**	**1–2**
1982	ŁKS Łódź	Group 8	(Switzerland) FC Zürich	**3–0**	**0–3**
1982	Motor Lublin	Group 4	(West Germany) MSV Duisburg	**3–2**	**1–4**
1982	Motor Lublin	Group 4	(Switzerland) FC Luzern	**2–2**	**0–1**
1982	Motor Lublin	Group 4	(Denmark) **Lyngby Boldklub**	**2–2**	**0–0**
1982	Pogoń Szczecin	Group 7	(Sweden) **IK Brage**	**1–0**	**0–2**
1982	Pogoń Szczecin	Group 7	(Czechoslovakia) Sparta Prague	**2–0**	**0–1**
1982	Pogoń Szczecin	Group 7	(Austria) Wiener Sport-Club	**3–3**	**4–3**
1982	**Widzew Łódź**	Group 2	(West Germany) Arminia Bielefeld	**2–1**	**1–1**
1982	**Widzew Łódź**	Group 2	(Belgium) RFC de Liège	**3–1**	**0–2**
1982	**Widzew Łódź**	Group 2	(Switzerland) FC St. Gallen	**0–1**	**2–1**
1983	Bałtyk Gdynia	Group 7	(Austria) FC Admira Wacker	**3–1**	**2–3**
1983	Bałtyk Gdynia	Group 7	(Denmark) Boldklubben 1903	**2–1**	**1–1**
1983	Bałtyk Gdynia	Group 7	(Sweden) **IFK Göteborg**	**0–0**	**0–3**
1983	Cracovia	Group 9	(Czechoslovakia) TJ Rudá Hvězda Cheb	**0–2**	**0–2**
1983	Cracovia	Group 9	(Austria) SK Sturm Graz	**1–3**	**2–0**
1983	Cracovia	Group 9	(Hungary) **Videoton Sport Club**	**1–1**	**0–6**
1983	**Pogoń Szczecin**	Group 3	(Sweden) Malmö FF	**2–0**	**2–1**
1983	**Pogoń Szczecin**	Group 3	(Switzerland) FC St. Gallen	**2–1**	**3–3**
1983	**Pogoń Szczecin**	Group 3	(West Germany) SV Werder Bremen	**2–1**	**0–4**
1984	**GKS Katowice**	Group 10	(Sweden) Östers IF	**3–0**	**1–1**
1984	**GKS Katowice**	Group 10	(Norway) Vålerenga Fotball	**2–1**	**1–1**
1984	**GKS Katowice**	Group 10	(Austria) SSW Innsbruck	**2–1**	**0–0**
1984	Górnik Zabrze	Group 5	(Sweden) **AIK Fotboll**	**1–0**	**3–2**
1984	Górnik Zabrze	Group 5	(East Germany) 1. FC Magdeburg	**3–0**	**1–2**
1984	Górnik Zabrze	Group 5	(West Germany) 1. FC Nürnberg	**1–0**	**1–2**
1985	**Górnik Zabrze**	Group 7	(Denmark) Aarhus Gymnastikforening	**2–1**	**3–2**
1985	**Górnik Zabrze**	Group 7	(Switzerland) BSC Young Boys	**3–0**	**4–1**
1985	**Górnik Zabrze**	Group 7	(Hungary) Zalaegerszegi TE	**1–1**	**1–0**
1985	Lech Poznań	Group 3	(Austria) FC Admira Wacker	**4–2**	**3–5**
1985	Lech Poznań	Group 3	(Denmark) Brøndby IF	**5–1**	**0–2**
1985	Lech Poznań	Group 3	(Sweden) **IFK Göteborg**	**1–4**	**2–0**
1985	Lechia Gdańsk	Group 6	(Denmark) Lyngby Boldklub	**0–1**	**1–4**
1985	Lechia Gdańsk	Group 6	(Czechoslovakia) **Sparta Prague**	**3–2**	**0–0**
1985	Lechia Gdańsk	Group 6	(Switzerland) FC Zürich	**1–0**	**1–2**
1986	Górnik Zabrze	Group 3	(Sweden) **Malmö FF**	**1–0**	**1–3**
1986	Górnik Zabrze	Group 3	(Norway) Rosenborg BK	**0–1**	**1–0**
1986	Górnik Zabrze	Group 3	(Hungary) Videoton Sport Club	**2–0**	**0–2**
1986	**Lech Poznań**	Group 9	(Austria) Linzer ASK	**0–0**	**1–1**
1986	**Lech Poznań**	Group 9	(Denmark) Odense Boldklub	**1–1**	**5–1**
1986	**Lech Poznań**	Group 9	(Hungary) Siófok Bányász SK	**4–1**	**0–0**
1986	Legia Warsaw	Group 5	(West Germany) Hannover 96	**1–0**	**2–2**
1986	Legia Warsaw	Group 5	(Czechoslovakia) **TJ Sigma ZTS Olomouc**	**5–1**	**0–3**
1986	Legia Warsaw	Group 5	(Switzerland) BSC Young Boys	**0–0**	**1–3**
1986	Widzew Łódź	Group 7	(Denmark) **Brøndby IF**	**3–3**	**0–3**
1986	Widzew Łódź	Group 7	(East Germany) 1. FC Magdeburg	**3–0**	**4–3**
1986	Widzew Łódź	Group 7	(Switzerland) FC St. Gallen	**3–2**	**3–0**
1987	Lech Poznań	Group 6	(Sweden) **AIK Fotboll**	**0–0**	**1–4**
1987	Lech Poznań	Group 6	(Denmark) Lyngby Boldklub	**0–1**	**0–0**
1987	Lech Poznań	Group 6	(Czechoslovakia) TJ Plastika Nitra	**3–0**	**1–2**
1987	**Pogoń Szczecin**	Group 2	(Sweden) Hammarby Fotboll	**3–0**	**3–2**
1987	**Pogoń Szczecin**	Group 2	(Switzerland) FC La Chaux-de-Fonds	**6–3**	**4–0**
1987	**Pogoń Szczecin**	Group 2	(East Germany) 1. FC Magdeburg	**3–1**	**1–2**
1988	ŁKS Łódź	Group 6	(Austria) Admira Wacker Wien	**2–6**	**2–2**
1988	ŁKS Łódź	Group 6	(West Germany) **FC Kaiserslautern**	**2–4**	**1–4**
1988	ŁKS Łódź	Group 6	(Switzerland) FC Luzern	**1–3**	**1–3**
1988	Pogoń Szczecin	Group 9	(Switzerland) **Grasshopper Club Zurich**	**0–0**	**0–1**
1988	Pogoń Szczecin	Group 9	(Sweden) Östers IF	**2–0**	**0–0**
1988	Pogoń Szczecin	Group 9	(Hungary) Pécsi Munkás Sport Club	**0–0**	**1–3**
1989	Stal Mielec	Group 6	(Sweden) Djurgårdens IF Fotboll	**0–1**	**4–1**
1989	Stal Mielec	Group 6	(Denmark) **Næstved BK**	**1–1**	**2–7**
1989	Stal Mielec	Group 6	(West Germany) Stuttgarter Kickers	**0–0**	**1–1**
1989	Wisła Kraków	Group 8	(Israel) Beitar Jerusalem F.C.	**4–0**	**2–2**
1989	Wisła Kraków	Group 8	(Israel) Hapoel Petah Tikva F.C.	**0–3**	**2–1**
1989	Wisła Kraków	Group 8	(Czechoslovakia) **Sparta Prague**	**3–3**	**0–3**
1990	**Lech Poznań**	Group 3	(Israel) Bnei Yehuda Tel Aviv F.C.	**3–0**	**4–2**
1990	**Lech Poznań**	Group 3	(Israel) Maccabi Haifa F.C.	**1–0**	**2–4**
1990	**Lech Poznań**	Group 3	(Hungary) Siófok Bányász SK	**3–1**	**2–0**
1991	Zagłębie Lubin	Group 2	(Sweden) IFK Norrköping	**2–1**	**2–2**
1991	Zagłębie Lubin	Group 2	(Switzerland) **FC Lausanne-Sport**	**1–3**	**1–9**
1991	Zagłębie Lubin	Group 2	(Denmark) Lyngby Boldklub	**3–0**	**0–3**
1992	Did not participate				
1993	Pogoń Szczecin	Group 3	FK Austria Wien	**0–2**	—N/a
1993	Pogoń Szczecin	Group 3	(Denmark) F.C. Copenhagen	—N/a	**4–1**
1993	Pogoń Szczecin	Group 3	(Sweden) **IFK Norrköping**	**1–4**	—N/a
1993	Pogoń Szczecin	Group 3	(Switzerland) FC Lausanne-Sport	—N/a	**0–4**
1993	Zawisza Bydgoszcz	Group 1	(Denmark) Brøndby IF	—N/a	**6–1**
1993	Zawisza Bydgoszcz	Group 1	(Sweden) Halmstads BK	**1–2**	—N/a
1993	Zawisza Bydgoszcz	Group 1	(Austria) **SK Rapid Wien**	—N/a	**1–1**
1993	Zawisza Bydgoszcz	Group 1	(Bulgaria) FC Yantra	**0–0**	—N/a
1994	Did not participate				

==== UEFA ====
Season	Club	Round	Opponent	Home	Away
Group stages With knockout rounds (1995–1997)
1995	Górnik Zabrze	Group 1	(Denmark) Aarhus Gymnastikforening	—N/a	**1–4**
1995	Górnik Zabrze	Group 1	(Switzerland) FC Basel	**1–2**	—N/a
1995	Górnik Zabrze	Group 1	(Germany) Karlsruher SC	**1–4**	—N/a
1995	Górnik Zabrze	Group 1	(England) Sheffield Wednesday F.C.	—N/a	**2–3**
1996	ŁKS Łódź	Group 8	(Germany) TSV 1860 München	—N/a	**0–5**
1996	ŁKS Łódź	Group 8	(Czech Republic) FC Kaučuk Opava	**0–3**	—N/a
1996	ŁKS Łódź	Group 8	(Russia) KAMAZ-Chally	—N/a	**0–3**
1996	ŁKS Łódź	Group 8	(Bulgaria) FC Spartak Varna	**1–1**	—N/a
1996	Zagłębie Lubin	Group 4	(Belgium) R. Charleroi S.C.	—N/a	**0–0**
1996	Zagłębie Lubin	Group 4	(Wales) Conwy United	**3–0**	—N/a
1996	Zagłębie Lubin	Group 4	(Austria) SV Ried	**2–1**	—N/a
1996	Zagłębie Lubin	Group 4	(Denmark) **Silkeborg IF**	—N/a	**0–0**
1997	Odra Wodzisław	Group 9	FK Austria Wien	—N/a	**5–1**
1997	Odra Wodzisław	Group 9	(France) Olympique Lyonnais	—N/a	**2–5**
1997	Odra Wodzisław	Group 9	(Romania) FC Rapid București	**2–4**	—N/a
1997	Odra Wodzisław	Group 9	(Slovakia) MŠK Žilina	**0–0**	—N/a
1997	Polonia Warsaw	Group 1	(Denmark) AaB	—N/a	**0–2**
1997	Polonia Warsaw	Group 1	(Belarus) FC Dinamo-93 Minsk	**1–4**	—N/a
1997	Polonia Warsaw	Group 1	(Germany) MSV Duisburg	**0–0**	—N/a
1997	Polonia Warsaw	Group 1	(Netherlands) SC Heerenveen	—N/a	**0–0**
Only knockout rounds (1998–2008)
1998	Ruch Chorzów	1st round	FK Austria Wien	**2–2**	**1–0**
1998	Ruch Chorzów	2nd round	(Sweden) Örgryte IS	**1–0** (a)	**1–2**
1998	Ruch Chorzów	3rd round	(Portugal) C.F. Estrela da Amadora	**1–1**	**1–1** **(4–2** p)
1998	Ruch Chorzów	Semi–Finals	(Hungary) DVSC-Epona	**1–0**	**3–0**
1998	Ruch Chorzów	Finals	(Italy) **Bologna F.C. 1909**	**0–2**	**0–1**
1999	Polonia Warsaw	1st round	(Moldova) CS Tiligul Tiraspol	**4–0**	**0–0**
1999	Polonia Warsaw	2nd round	(Denmark) F.C. Copenhagen	**1–1**	**3–0**
1999	Polonia Warsaw	3rd round	(Hungary) Vasas Danubius Hotels	**2–0**	**2–1**
1999	Polonia Warsaw	Semi-finals	(France) FC Metz	**1–1**	**1–5**
2000	Zagłębie Lubin	1st round	(Azerbaijan) FK Masallı	**4–0**	**3–1**
2000	Zagłębie Lubin	2nd round	(Croatia) NK Slaven Belupo	**1–1**	**0–0** (a)
2001	Dyskobolia Grodzisk Wielkopolski	1st round	(Bulgaria) PFC Spartak Varna	**1–0**	**0–4**
2001	Zagłębie Lubin	1st round	(Malta) Hibernians F.C.	**4–0**	**0–1**
2001	Zagłębie Lubin	2nd round	(Belgium) K.S. Lokeren Sint-Niklaas Waasland	**2–2**	**1–2**
2002	Zagłębie Lubin	1st round	(Latvia) Dinaburg FC	**1–1**	**0–1**
2003	Odra Wodzisław	1st round	(Republic of Ireland) Shamrock Rovers F.C.	**1–2**	**0–1**
2003	Polonia Warsaw	1st round	(Kazakhstan) FC Tobol	**0–3**	**1–2**
2004	Odra Wodzisław	1st round	(Belarus) FC Dinamo Minsk	**1–0**	**0–2**
2005	Lech Poznań	1st round	(Azerbaijan) Karvan FK	**2–0**	**2–1**
2005	Lech Poznań	2nd round	(France) **RC Lens**	**0–1**	**1–2**
2005	Pogoń Szczecin	1st round	(Moldova) CS Tiligul-Tiras Tiraspol	**6–2**	**3–0**
2005	Pogoń Szczecin	2nd round	(Czech Republic) SK Sigma Olomouc	**0–0**	**0–1**
2006	Lech Poznań	2nd round	(Moldova) FC Tiraspol	**1–3**	**0–1**
2007	Legia Warsaw	2nd round	(Lithuania) FK Vėtra	—N/a	**0–3** (wo)
2008	Cracovia	1st round	(Belarus) FC Shakhtyor Soligorsk	**1–2**	**0–3**

Bold denotes the competition winner. Bold and italic denote the group winner (only 1967–1994 seasons).

=== Intra-national matches ===
Competition	Round	Host	Result	Guest
1963–64 Intertoto Cup	Semi-finals	Polonia Bytom	**2–1**	Odra Opole
1963–64 Intertoto Cup	Semi-finals	Odra Opole	**0–0**	Polonia Bytom
