= 1968 Intertoto Cup =

Tournament details
- Teams: 50

Tournament statistics
- Matches played: 132

The 1968 Intertoto Cup was the second, following the previous year's in which no knock-out rounds were contested, and therefore the second in which no winner was declared. The tournament was expanded, with 50 clubs and fourteen groups compared to 48 clubs and twelve groups the season before. Clubs from Portugal and Spain participated for the first time.

== Group stage ==
The teams were divided into fourteen groups - of three clubs each in the 'A' section, and of four clubs each in the 'B' section. Clubs from Belgium, France, Italy, the Netherlands, Spain and Portugal were placed in 'A'; while clubs from East Germany, Poland, Sweden and Denmark were placed in 'B' groups. Clubs from West Germany, Austria, Czechoslovakia and Switzerland were placed in both sections.

=== Group A1 ===
Pos	Team	Pld	W	D	L	GF	GA	GD	Pts
1	(West Germany) Nürnberg	4	3	1	0	13	3	+10	7
2	(Belgium) Anderlecht	4	1	1	2	7	10	−3	3
3	(Italy) Internazionale	4	1	0	3	3	10	−7	2

=== Group A2 ===
Pos	Team	Pld	W	D	L	GF	GA	GD	Pts
1	(Netherlands) Ajax	4	2	2	0	7	3	+4	6
2	(Italy) Torino	4	1	1	2	8	8	0	3
3	(Spain) Atlético Madrid	4	1	1	2	5	9	−4	3

=== Group A3 ===
Pos	Team	Pld	W	D	L	GF	GA	GD	Pts
1	(Portugal) Sporting	4	2	1	1	6	5	+1	5
2	(Czechoslovakia) Dukla Prague	3	1	1	1	3	2	+1	3
3	(Austria) Rapid Wien	3	1	0	2	4	6	−2	2

- Note: Match between Dukla Prague and Rapid Vienna was not played.

=== Group A4 ===
Pos	Team	Pld	W	D	L	GF	GA	GD	Pts
1	(Netherlands) Feyenoord	4	2	2	0	8	2	+6	6
2	(France) Saint-Étienne	4	1	2	1	5	5	0	4
3	(Belgium) Standard Liège	4	0	2	2	5	11	−6	2

=== Group A5 ===
Pos	Team	Pld	W	D	L	GF	GA	GD	Pts
1	(Spain) Español	4	3	0	1	7	3	+4	6
2	(West Germany) 1860 Munich	4	3	0	1	9	6	+3	6
3	Austria Wien	4	0	0	4	4	11	−7	0

=== Group A6 ===
Pos	Team	Pld	W	D	L	GF	GA	GD	Pts	ADO	PAR	LUG
1	(Netherlands) ADO Den Haag	4	3	0	1	6	4	+2	6	—	2–0	2–0
2	(France) RCF Paris	4	2	1	1	5	3	+2	5	3–0	—	2–1
3	(Switzerland) Lugano	4	0	1	3	2	6	−4	1	1–2	0–0	—

Source: mogiel.net
Rules for classification: 1) Points; 2) Goal difference; 3) Goals scored; 4) Head-to-head points; 5) Away goals scored; 6) Draw.

=== Group B1 ===
Pos	Team	Pld	W	D	L	GF	GA	GD	Pts	KMS	LIN	HEL	BIE
1	(East Germany) FC Karl-Marx-Stadt	6	3	2	1	9	4	+5	8	—	1–1	3–0	3–0
2	(Austria) LASK	6	2	3	1	14	10	+4	7	2–0	—	4–1	3–3
3	(Sweden) Helsingborg	6	3	1	2	10	9	+1	7	0–0	2–1	—	3–0
4	(Switzerland) Biel-Bienne	6	0	2	4	8	18	−10	2	1–2	3–3	1–4	—

Source: mogiel.net
Rules for classification: 1) Points; 2) Goal difference; 3) Goals scored; 4) Head-to-head points; 5) Away goals scored; 6) Draw.

=== Group B2 ===
Pos	Team	Pld	W	D	L	GF	GA	GD	Pts	ROS	KAT	ÖRE	CDF
1	(East Germany) Hansa Rostock	6	5	1	0	10	3	+7	11	—	2–0	1–0	3–1
2	(Poland) GKS Katowice	6	3	0	3	4	5	−1	6	0–1	—	1–0	2–1
3	(Sweden) Örebro	6	2	1	3	14	4	+10	5	1–1	0–1	—	9–0
4	(Switzerland) La Chaux-de-Fonds	6	1	0	5	4	20	−16	2	1–2	1–0	0–4	—

Source: mogiel.net
Rules for classification: 1) Points; 2) Goal difference; 3) Goals scored; 4) Head-to-head points; 5) Away goals scored; 6) Draw.

=== Group B3 ===
Pos	Team	Pld	W	D	L	GF	GA	GD	Pts
1	(Czechoslovakia) Slovan Bratislava	6	5	0	1	15	7	+8	10
2	(Austria) Wiener Sport-Club	6	2	2	2	12	14	−2	6
3	(Sweden) Malmö FF	6	2	1	3	9	12	−3	5
4	(West Germany) Hamburg	6	1	1	4	13	16	−3	3

=== Group B4 ===
Pos	Team	Pld	W	D	L	GF	GA	GD	Pts
1	(Czechoslovakia) Košice	6	5	0	1	12	6	+6	10
2	(Poland) Szombierki Bytom	6	4	0	2	12	9	+3	8
3	(Sweden) Djurgården	6	2	0	4	12	14	−2	4
4	(West Germany) Werder Bremen	6	1	0	5	6	13	−7	2

=== Group B5 ===
Pos	Team	Pld	W	D	L	GF	GA	GD	Pts
1	(Czechoslovakia) Lokomotíva Košice	6	5	0	1	17	6	+11	10
2	(East Germany) FC Carl Zeiss Jena	6	3	2	1	8	3	+5	8
3	Austria Salzburg	6	1	2	3	2	9	−7	4
4	(Denmark) Horsens	6	0	2	4	3	12	−9	2

=== Group B6 ===
Pos	Team	Pld	W	D	L	GF	GA	GD	Pts
1	(Poland) Odra Opole	6	5	1	0	9	1	+8	11
2	(Czechoslovakia) Jednota Trenčín	6	3	1	2	9	4	+5	7
3	(East Germany) 1. FC Magdeburg	6	3	0	3	12	9	+3	6
4	(Denmark) Hvidovre	6	0	0	6	5	21	−16	0

=== Group B7 ===
Pos	Team	Pld	W	D	L	GF	GA	GD	Pts	EIN	LS	TIN	AB
1	(West Germany) Eintracht Braunschweig	6	4	1	1	11	7	+4	9	—	2–1	3–1	2–0
2	(Switzerland) Lausanne-Sport	6	3	1	2	14	10	+4	7	4–2	—	4–1	2–2
3	(Austria) Wacker Innsbruck	6	2	0	4	8	12	−4	4	1–2	3–2	—	0–1
4	(Denmark) AB	6	1	2	3	3	7	−4	4	0–0	0–1	0–2	—

Source: mogiel.net
Rules for classification: 1) Points; 2) Goal difference; 3) Goals scored; 4) Head-to-head points; 5) Away goals scored; 6) Draw.

=== Group B8 ===
Pos	Team	Pld	W	D	L	GF	GA	GD	Pts	LEG	HAN	FRE	BEL
1	(Poland) Legia Warsaw	6	4	2	0	16	6	+10	10	—	2–2	4–0	4–0
2	(West Germany) Hannover 96	6	3	2	1	16	7	+9	8	2–3	—	3–0	4–1
3	(Denmark) Frem	6	2	1	3	7	9	−2	5	1–2	0–0	—	2–0
4	(Switzerland) Bellinzona	6	0	1	5	3	20	−17	1	1–1	1–5	0–4	—

Source: mogiel.net
Rules for classification: 1) Points; 2) Goal difference; 3) Goals scored; 4) Head-to-head points; 5) Away goals scored; 6) Draw.

== See also ==
- 1968–69 European Cup
- 1968–69 UEFA Cup Winners' Cup
- 1968–69 Inter-Cities Fairs Cup
