= 1969 Intertoto Cup =

Tournament details
- Teams: 36

Tournament statistics
- Matches played: 108

In the 1969 Intertoto Cup no knock-out rounds were contested, and therefore no winner was declared. Jednota Trenčín were the best performers, with 11 points.

== Group stage ==
The teams were divided into nine groups of four teams each.

=== Group 1 ===
Pos	Team	Pld	W	D	L	GF	GA	GD	Pts	MAL	KAI	MAR	SER
1	(Sweden) Malmö FF	6	4	1	1	15	8	+7	9	—	4–0	1–0	4–2
2	(West Germany) Kaiserslautern	6	3	0	3	9	8	+1	6	1–3	—	6–0	1–0
3	(France) Marseille	6	1	3	2	3	9	−6	5	1–1	1–0	—	1–1
4	(Switzerland) Servette	6	1	2	3	7	9	−2	4	4–2	0–1	0–0	—

Source: mogiel.net
Rules for classification: 1) Points; 2) Goal average.

=== Group 2 ===
Pos	Team	Pld	W	D	L	GF	GA	GD	Pts	SZB	ÖST	GAE	LUG
1	(Poland) Szombierki Bytom	6	3	2	1	17	6	+11	8	—	2–1	1–0	11–0
2	(Sweden) Östers IF	6	3	2	1	11	8	+3	8	3–1	—	3–2	1–0
3	(Netherlands) Go Ahead Eagles	6	1	3	2	10	8	+2	5	2–2	1–1	—	1–1
4	(Switzerland) Lugano	6	0	3	3	3	19	−16	3	0–0	2–1	0–4	—

Source: mogiel.net
Rules for classification: 1) Points; 2) Goal average.

=== Group 3 ===
Pos	Team	Pld	W	D	L	GF	GA	GD	Pts	FÜR	ZSO	WSC	DJU
1	(West Germany) SpVgg Fürth	6	2	3	1	7	5	+2	7	—			
2	(Poland) Zagłębie Sosnowiec	6	3	1	2	8	6	+2	7		—		
3	(Austria) Wiener Sport-Club	6	2	1	3	14	11	+3	5			—	
4	(Sweden) Djurgården	6	2	1	3	9	16	−7	5				—

Source: mogiel.net
Rules for classification: 1) Points; 2) Goal average.

=== Group 4 ===
Pos	Team	Pld	W	D	L	GF	GA	GD	Pts	ŽIL	ÖRE	NEC	BEL
1	(Czechoslovakia) Žilina	6	4	1	1	12	7	+5	9	—	4–1	2–1	3–0
2	(Sweden) Örebro	6	2	2	2	9	7	+2	6	3–0	—	1–1	1–2
3	(Netherlands) NEC	6	1	4	1	8	7	+1	6	1–1	0–0	—	2–0
4	(Switzerland) Bellinzona	6	1	1	4	6	14	−8	3	1–2	0–3	3–3	—

Source: mogiel.net
Rules for classification: 1) Points; 2) Goal average.

=== Group 5 ===
Pos	Team	Pld	W	D	L	GF	GA	GD	Pts	NOR	RWI	HAN	YB
1	(Sweden) Norrköping	6	3	1	2	11	8	+3	7	—	3–2	1–0	1–2
2	(Austria) Rapid Wien	6	2	2	2	13	7	+6	6	0–0	—	2–0	8–1
3	(West Germany) Hannover 96	6	2	2	2	7	8	−1	6	3–2	1–1	—	1–1
4	(Switzerland) Young Boys	6	2	1	3	8	16	−8	5	1–4	2–0	1–2	—

Source: mogiel.net
Rules for classification: 1) Points; 2) Goal average.

=== Group 6 ===
Pos	Team	Pld	W	D	L	GF	GA	GD	Pts	TRE	AWI	SAA	KB
1	(Czechoslovakia) Jednota Trenčín	6	5	1	0	16	3	+13	11	—			
2	Austria Wien	6	2	1	3	10	10	0	5		—		
3	(West Germany) Saarbrücken	6	2	1	3	7	11	−4	5			—	
4	(Denmark) KB	6	1	1	4	11	20	−9	3				—

Source: mogiel.net
Rules for classification: 1) Points; 2) Goal average.

=== Group 7 ===
Pos	Team	Pld	W	D	L	GF	GA	GD	Pts
1	(Denmark) Frem	6	3	3	0	12	7	+5	9
2	(Netherlands) GVAV Groningen	6	2	2	2	6	7	−1	6
3	(Czechoslovakia) VCHZ Pardubice	6	2	1	3	7	10	−3	5
4	(Austria) LASK	6	1	2	3	6	7	−1	4

=== Group 8 ===
Pos	Team	Pld	W	D	L	GF	GA	GD	Pts
1	(Poland) Wisła Kraków	6	4	1	1	10	7	+3	9
2	(Czechoslovakia) Košice	6	3	2	1	14	8	+6	8
3	(Belgium) Lierse	6	2	3	1	11	6	+5	7
4	(Denmark) Esbjerg	6	0	0	6	2	16	−14	0

=== Group 9 ===
Pos	Team	Pld	W	D	L	GF	GA	GD	Pts	ODR	BEV	CDF	B13
1	(Poland) Odra Opole	6	4	1	1	11	4	+7	9	—	2–0	3–0	2–0
2	(Belgium) Beveren-Waas	6	2	2	2	8	6	+2	6	0–0	—	4–0	1–1
3	(Switzerland) La Chaux-de-Fonds	6	3	0	3	9	13	−4	6	3–2	3–2	—	3–1
4	(Denmark) B 1913	6	1	1	4	4	9	−5	3	1–2	0–1	1–0	—

Source: mogiel.net
Rules for classification: 1) Points; 2) Goal average.

== See also ==
- 1969–70 European Cup
- 1969–70 UEFA Cup Winners' Cup
- 1969–70 Inter-Cities Fairs Cup
