= 1965–66 in Swiss football =

Football in Switzerland
- Season: 1965–66

Men's football
- Nationalliga A: Zürich
- Nationalliga B: Winterthur
- 1. Liga: 1. Liga champions: FC Wettingen; Group West: Etoile Carouge; Group Cenral: FC Langenthal; Group South and East: FC Wettingen
- Swiss Cup: Zürich

The following is a summary of the 1965–66 season of competitive football in Switzerland.

== Nationalliga A ==
=== Final league table ===
Pos	Team	Pld	W	D	L	GF	GA	GD	Pts	Qualification or relegation
1	Zürich	26	18	6	2	73	25	+48	42	Swiss Champions, qualified for 1966–67 European Cup and Swiss Cup winners,
2	Servette	26	14	7	5	57	45	+12	35	Swiss Cup finalist, qualified for 1966–67 Cup Winners' Cup
3	Lausanne-Sport	26	12	8	6	72	46	+26	32	
4	La Chaux-de-Fonds	26	12	7	7	53	42	+11	31	Entered 1966–67 Intertoto Cup
5	Young Boys	26	11	7	8	72	47	+25	29	
6	Basel	26	10	7	9	64	57	+7	27	
7	Grasshopper Club	26	11	5	10	55	54	+1	27	
8	Sion	26	9	8	9	36	36	0	26	Entered 1966–67 Intertoto Cup
9	Lugano	26	6	10	10	27	37	−10	22	
10	Biel-Bienne	26	6	10	10	38	56	−18	22	Entered 1966–67 Intertoto Cup
11	Grenchen	26	8	6	12	42	65	−23	22	Entered 1966–67 Intertoto Cup
12	Young Fellows Zürich	26	7	7	12	46	62	−16	21	
13	Luzern	26	4	10	12	36	56	−20	18	Relegated to 1966–67 Nationalliga B
14	Urania Genève Sport	26	3	4	19	35	78	−43	10	Relegated to 1966–67 Nationalliga B

Source: rsssf.com
Rules for classification: 1) Points; 2) Goal difference within the league, however with play-off for qualifiers;

== Nationalliga B ==
=== Final league table ===
Pos	Team	Pld	W	D	L	GF	GA	GD	Pts	Qualification or relegation
1	FC Winterthur	26	17	3	6	52	29	+23	37	NLB Champions and promoted to 1966–67 Nationalliga A
2	FC Moutier	26	16	2	8	47	46	+1	34	Promoted to 1966–67 Nationalliga A
3	SC Brühl	26	12	7	7	55	33	+22	31	
4	AC Bellinzona	26	10	8	8	48	33	+15	28	
5	St. Gallen	26	10	7	9	51	46	+5	27	
6	FC Thun	26	11	4	11	45	39	+6	26	
7	FC Chiasso	26	11	3	12	39	42	−3	25	
8	FC Blue Stars Zürich	26	11	3	12	51	58	−7	25	
9	FC Solothurn	26	10	5	11	34	44	−10	25	
10	FC Aarau	26	11	2	13	43	43	0	24	
11	FC Le Locle	26	10	4	12	38	38	0	24	
12	FC Baden	26	7	9	10	35	38	−3	23	
13	FC Porrentruy	26	9	4	13	29	44	−15	22	Relegated to 1966–67 1. Liga
14	FC Cantonal Neuchâtel	26	3	7	16	26	60	−34	13	Relegated to 1966–67 1. Liga

Source: rsssf.com
Rules for classification: 1) Points; 2) Goal difference within the league, however with play-off for qualifiers;

== 1. Liga ==
=== Group West ===
Pos	Team	Pld	W	D	L	GF	GA	GD	Pts	Qualification or relegation
1	Etoile Carouge FC	24	16	5	3	54	21	+33	37	Play-off to Nationalliga B
2	FC Xamax	24	11	10	3	47	23	+24	32	Play-off to Nationalliga B
3	FC Fribourg	24	11	6	7	52	29	+23	28	
4	CS Chênois	24	10	8	6	39	34	+5	28	
5	FC Versoix	24	10	7	7	38	31	+7	27	
6	Yverdon-Sport FC	24	11	3	10	44	37	+7	25	
7	FC Raron	24	9	6	9	34	40	−6	24	
8	FC Stade Lausanne	24	9	5	10	41	47	−6	23	
9	Vevey-Sports	24	9	3	12	39	41	−2	21	
10	FC Forward Morges	24	7	6	11	25	34	−9	20	
11	FC Martigny-Sports	24	7	4	13	25	54	−29	18	
12	FC Meyrin	24	6	5	13	30	38	−8	17	Relegation to 2. Liga Interregional
13	FC Montreux-Sports	24	4	4	16	29	68	−39	12	Relegation to 2. Liga Interregional

Source: RSSSF
Rules for classification: 1) Points; 2) Goal difference within the league, but decider play-off for qualifiers.

=== Group Central ===
Pos	Team	Pld	W	D	L	GF	GA	GD	Pts	Qualification or relegation
1	FC Langenthal	24	18	4	2	73	21	+52	40	Play-off to Nationalliga B
2	FC Olten	24	14	4	6	39	27	+12	32	Play-off to Nationalliga B
3	FC Concordia Basel	24	12	3	9	59	44	+15	27	
4	FC Bern	24	12	3	9	58	46	+12	27	
5	FC Wohlen	24	12	3	9	48	40	+8	27	
6	SC Burgdorf	24	11	4	9	40	34	+6	26	
7	FC Minerva Bern	24	8	6	10	44	39	+5	22	
8	FC Fontainemelon	24	9	5	10	39	46	−7	23	
9	SR Delémont	24	9	3	12	49	61	−12	21	
10	FC Alle	24	9	2	13	40	50	−10	20	
11	FC Nordstern Basel	24	8	3	13	26	49	−23	19	
12	FC Trimbach	24	6	4	14	25	49	−24	16	Relegation to 2. Liga Interregional
13	US Bienne-Boujean	24	3	6	15	31	65	−34	12	Relegation to 2. Liga Interregional

Source: RSSSF
Rules for classification: 1) Points; 2) Goal difference within the league, but decider play-off for qualifiers.

=== Group South and East ===
Pos	Team	Pld	W	D	L	GF	GA	GD	Pts	Qualification or relegation
1	FC Wettingen	24	17	3	4	61	15	+46	37	Play-off to Nationalliga B
2	SC Zug	24	11	8	5	33	28	+5	30	Play-off to Nationalliga B
3	FC Küsnacht	24	9	8	7	29	23	+6	26	
4	FC Vaduz	24	11	4	9	54	53	+1	26	
5	FC Locarno	24	7	11	6	24	19	+5	25	
6	FC Red Star Zürich	24	10	4	10	39	36	+3	24	
7	FC Emmenbrücke	24	8	8	8	37	37	0	24	
8	FC Schaffhausen	24	8	7	9	32	40	−8	23	
9	FC Rorschach	24	9	3	12	27	40	−13	21	
10	FC Widnau	24	7	6	11	37	44	−7	20	
11	FC Amriswil	24	4	11	9	39	46	−7	19	Play-out against relegation
12	FC Dietikon	24	6	7	11	20	41	−21	19	Play-out against relegation
13	FC Oerlikon/Polizei ZH	24	8	2	14	42	52	−10	18	Relegation to 2. Liga Interregional

Source: RSSSF
Rules for classification: 1) Points; 2) Goal difference within the league, but decider play-off for qualifiers.

==== Decider for twelfth place ====
The decider was played in Frauenfeld.

Team 1	Score	Team 2
FC Amriswil	3–0	FC Dietikon

FC Amriswil win and remain in the division. FC Dietikon were relegated to 2. Liga Interregional.

=== Promotion play-off ===
The three group winners played a round-robin against the four teams who had not been in their group. The teams did not play against the team that had been in the same group.

==== Matches ====
The first games were played on 5 June.

Team 1	Score	Team 2
FC Wettingen	4–2	Etoile Carouge FC
SC Zug	1–0	FC Olten
FC Xamax	3–2	FC Langenthal

The second round was played on 12 June.

Team 1	Score	Team 2
FC Langenthal	3–0	FC Wettingen
FC Olten	1–2	FC Xamax
Etoile Carouge FC	3–3	SC Zug

The third round was played on 19 June.

Team 1	Score	Team 2
FC Langenthal	1–1	Etoile Carouge FC
FC Olten	2–4	FC Wettingen
FC Xamax	5–0	SC Zug

The final round was played on 26 June.

Team 1	Score	Team 2
FC Wettingen	3–0	FC Xamax
Etoile Carouge FC	5–1	FC Olten
SC Zug	2–3	FC Langenthal

==== Final table ====
Pos	Team	Pld	W	D	L	GF	GA	GD	Pts	Qualification
1	FC Wettingen	4	3	0	1	11	7	+4	6	1. Liga champions promoted to 1966–67 Nationalliga B
2	FC Xamax	4	3	0	1	10	6	+4	6	Promoted to 1966–67 Nationalliga B
3	FC Langenthal	4	2	1	1	9	6	+3	5	
4	Etoile Carouge FC	4	1	2	1	11	9	+2	4	
5	SC Zug	4	1	1	2	6	11	−5	3	
6	FC Olten	4	0	0	4	4	12	−8	0	

Source: RSSSF
Rules for classification: 1) Points; 2) Head-to-head points.

== Swiss Cup ==
The competition was played in a knockout system. In the case of a draw, extra time was played. If the teams were still level after extra time, the match was replayed at the away team's ground. In the replay, in case of a draw after extra time, it was to be decided with a penalty shoot-out.

=== Early rounds ===
The routes of the finalists to the final were:

- Third round: teams from the NLA with byes.
- Fourth round: Blue Stars-Zürich 1:6. Servette-Fontainemelon 5:2.
- Fifth round: Lugano-Zürich 1:2. Servette-Lausanne 1:0
- Quarter-finals. Zürich-Bellinzona 5:1. Servette-La Chaux-de-Fonds 2:1.
- Semi-finals: Zürich-Cantonal Neuchâtel 4:2. Basel-Servette 1:3.

=== Final ===
The final was held in the former Wankdorf Stadium on Easter Monday 11 April 1966.

11 April 1966

Zürich	2–0	Servette
Winiger 32'; Künzli 65'	FCZ summary Fussball Schweiz

Wankdorf Stadium, Bern
Attendance: 54,000 (sold out)
Referee: (Switzerland) Anton Bucheli (Lucerne)
- Comments: The largest attendance to date for a Swiss Cup final. First ever final appearance for FC Zurich.

== Swiss Clubs in Europe ==
- Lausanne-Sport as 1964–65 Nationalliga A champions: 1965–66 European Cup
- Sion as 1964–65 Swiss Cup winners: 1965–66 European Cup Winners' Cup
- Grasshopper Club: Entered 1965–66 Intertoto Cup
- Lugano: Entered 1965–66 Intertoto Cup
- La Chaux-de-Fonds: Entered 1965–66 Intertoto Cup
- Luzern: Entered 1965–66 Intertoto Cup

=== Lausanne ===
==== European Cup ====
===== Preliminary round =====
22 September 1965 First leg	Lausanne-Sports (Switzerland)	0–0	(Czechoslovakia) Sparta Prague	Stade Olympique de la Pontaise, Lausanne
		Report		Attendance: 25,614; Referee: Vital Loraux (Belgium)

29 September 1965 Second leg	Sparta Prague (Czechoslovakia)	4–0	(Switzerland) Lausanne-Sports	Stadion Letná, Prague
	Mráz 20', 24', 76'; Dyba 82'	Report		Attendance: 14,659; Referee: Ferdinand Marschall (Austria)

Sparta Prague won 4–0 on aggregate.

=== Sion ===
==== Cup Winners' Cup ====
===== First round =====
25 August 1965 First leg	Sion (Switzerland)	5–1	(Turkey) Galatasaray	Stade Tourbillon, Sion
	Eschmann 12'; Eschmann 50'; Quentin 55'; Stockbauer 80'; Stockbauer 89'		43' Kutver	Attendance: 7,558; Referee: (Italy) Alessandro D'Agostini

29 September 1965 Second leg	Galatasaray SK (Turkey)	2–1	(Switzerland) FC Sion	Istanbul
EET	Uğur Köken 33'; Ayhan Elmastaşoğlu 59'		Claude Sixt 50'	Stadium: Ali Sami Yen Stadi; Attendance: 20,049; Referee: (Socialist Federal Republic of Yugoslavia) Zivko Bajic

Sion won 6–3 on aggregate

===== Second round =====
17 November 1965 First leg	1. FC Magdeburg (East Germany)	8–1	(Switzerland) Sion	Ernst-Grube-Stadion, Magdeburg
	Eckhardt 9', 25'; Stöcker 45', 57'; Kubisch 53', 63'; Walter 69', 77'		35' Eschmann	Attendance: 8,720; Referee: (Finland) Toimi Olkku

24 November 1965 Second leg	Sion (Switzerland)	2–2	(East Germany) 1. FC Magdeburg	Stade Tourbillon, Sion
	Desbiolles 56', 72'		1', 35' Wiedemann	Attendance: 2,979; Referee: (Croatia) Stjepan Varadinec

Magdeburg won 10-3 on aggregate

=== Grasshopper Club ===
==== Intertoto Cup ====
===== Group A2 =====
Pos	Team	Pld	W	D	L	GF	GA	GD	Pts	F54	KAI	DJU	GCZ
1	(Netherlands) Fortuna '54	6	5	0	1	10	3	+7	10	—	2–0	3–0	2–1
2	(West Germany) Kaiserslautern	6	2	2	2	8	10	−2	6	2–1	—	0–3	1–1
3	(Sweden) Djurgården	6	2	1	3	9	11	−2	5	0–1	1–1	—	3–2
4	(Switzerland) Grasshopper Club	6	1	1	4	10	13	−3	3	0–1	2–4	4–2	—

Source: mogiel.net
Rules for classification: 1) Points; 2) Goal difference; 3) Goals scored; 4) Head-to-head points; 5) Draw.

=== Lugano ===
==== Intertoto Cup ====
===== Group A1 =====
Pos	Team	Pld	W	D	L	GF	GA	GD	Pts	LUG	MAL	ADO	NEU
1	(Switzerland) Lugano	6	3	2	1	9	4	+5	8	—	1–0	3–0	1–2
2	(Sweden) Malmö FF	6	2	2	2	7	7	0	6	1–1	—	2–1	2–0
3	(Netherlands) ADO Den Haag	6	2	1	3	7	9	−2	5	0–2	1–1	—	2–1
4	(West Germany) Borussia Neunkirchen	6	2	1	3	7	10	−3	5	1–1	3–1	0–3	—

Source: mogiel.net
Rules for classification: 1) Points; 2) Goal difference; 3) Goals scored; 4) Head-to-head points; 5) Draw.

===== Quarter-finals =====
Team 1	Score	Team 2
Fortuna '54 (Netherlands)	1–1	(Switzerland) Lugano
Lugano (Switzerland)	1–0	(Netherlands) Fortuna '54

Lugano won 2–1 on aggregate and continued to the semi-finals.

===== Semi-finals =====
Team 1	Score	Team 2
Lugano (Switzerland)	0–0	(Sweden) Norrköping
Norrköping (Sweden)	1–1	(Switzerland) Lugano

Drawn 1–1 on aggregate. Norrköping progressed to the final on toss of a coin.

=== La Chaux-de-Fonds ===
==== Intertoto Cup ====
===== Group A3 =====
Pos	Team	Pld	W	D	L	GF	GA	GD	Pts	NOR	PSV	EIN	CDF
1	(Sweden) Norrköping	6	4	1	1	16	7	+9	9	—	2–3	1–0	7–1
2	(Netherlands) PSV	6	4	0	2	15	12	+3	8	1–3	—	3–0	2–1
3	(West Germany) Eintracht Frankfurt	6	2	0	4	11	11	0	4	1–2	4–2	—	4–0
4	(Switzerland) La Chaux-de-Fonds	6	1	1	4	8	20	−12	3	1–1	2–4	3–2	—

Source: mogiel.net
Rules for classification: 1) Points; 2) Goal difference; 3) Goals scored; 4) Head-to-head points; 5) Draw.

=== Luzern ===
==== Intertoto Cup ====
===== Group A4 =====
Pos	Team	Pld	W	D	L	GF	GA	GD	Pts	ÖRG	SPA	EIN	LUZ
1	(Sweden) Örgryte	6	3	2	1	16	9	+7	8	—	1–1	3–1	8–1
2	(Netherlands) Sparta Rotterdam	6	2	4	0	10	6	+4	8	2–2	—	3–0	0–0
3	(West Germany) Eintracht Braunschweig	6	2	1	3	16	12	+4	5	3–0	1–2	—	7–0
4	(Switzerland) Luzern	6	0	3	3	8	23	−15	3	1–2	2–2	4–4	—

Source: mogiel.net
Rules for classification: 1) Points; 2) Goal difference; 3) Goals scored; 4) Head-to-head points; 5) Draw.

== Sources ==
- Switzerland 1965–66 at RSSSF
- European Competitions 1965–66 at RSSSF.com
- Cup finals at Fussball-Schweiz
- Intertoto history at Pawel Mogielnicki's Page
- Josef Zindel (2018). FC Basel 1893. Die ersten 125 Jahre (in German). Basel: Friedrich Reinhardt Verlag. ISBN 978-3-7245-2305-5.

Preceded by 1964–65	Seasons in Swiss football	Succeeded by 1966–67

{{1965–66 in Swiss football}}
