= 1966–67 in Swiss football =

Football in Switzerland
- Season: 1966–67

Men's football
- Nationalliga A: Basel
- Nationalliga B: Luzern
- 1. Liga: 1. Liga champions: FC Bern; Group West: FC Fribourg; Group Cenral: FC Cantonal Neuchâtel; Group South and East: FC Frauenfeld
- Swiss Cup: Basel

The following is a summary of the 1966–67 season of competitive football in Switzerland.

== Nationalliga A ==
=== Final league table ===
Pos	Team	Pld	W	D	L	GF	GA	GD	Pts	Qualification
1	Basel	26	16	8	2	61	20	+41	40	Swiss Champions, qualified for 1967–68 European Cup and Swiss Cup winners
2	Zürich	26	18	3	5	70	31	+39	39	
3	Lugano	26	17	5	4	51	29	+22	39	Entered 1967 Intertoto Cup
4	Grasshopper Club	26	14	4	8	60	31	+29	32	Entered 1967 Intertoto Cup
5	Servette	26	10	6	10	49	35	+14	26	
6	Sion	26	10	6	10	48	38	+10	26	Entered 1967 Intertoto Cup
7	Young Boys	26	10	6	10	44	48	−4	26	Entered 1967 Intertoto Cup
8	Grenchen	26	10	4	12	43	49	−6	24	Entered 1967 Intertoto Cup
9	Young Fellows Zürich	26	9	6	11	33	44	−11	24	Entered 1967 Intertoto Cup
10	Lausanne-Sport	26	9	3	14	46	44	+2	21	Swiss Cup finalist, qualified for 1966–67 Cup Winners' Cup and entered 1967 Intertoto Cup
11	Biel-Bienne	26	8	5	13	25	42	−17	21	
12	La Chaux-de-Fonds	26	8	4	14	34	48	−14	20	To relegation play-out
13	Winterthur	26	8	4	14	33	54	−21	20	To relegation play-out
14	Moutier	26	2	2	22	16	100	−84	6	Relegated to Nationalliga B

Source: rsssf.com
Rules for classification: 1) Points; 2) Goal difference within the league, however with play-off for qualifiers;

=== Relegation play-out ===
The decider against relegation was played on 14 June 1967 at Wankdorf Stadium in Bern.

Team 1	Score	Team 2
La Chaux-de-Fonds	3–1	Winterthur

La Chaux-de-Fonds win and remain in the top tier. Winterthur are relegated to 1967–68 Nationalliga B.

== Nationalliga B ==
=== Final league table ===
Pos	Team	Pld	W	D	L	GF	GA	GD	Pts	Qualification or relegation
1	FC Luzern	26	17	7	2	68	25	+43	41	NLB Champions and promoted to 1968–69 Nationalliga A
2	AC Bellinzona	26	16	6	4	47	43	+4	38	Promoted to 1968–69 Nationalliga A
3	FC Wettingen	26	14	4	8	53	36	+17	32	
4	FC Aarau	26	10	12	4	39	29	+10	32	
5	FC St. Gallen	26	10	7	9	51	46	+5	27	
6	FC Xamax	26	11	5	10	42	40	+2	27	
7	FC Thun	26	9	8	9	38	43	−5	26	
8	Urania Genève Sport	26	10	4	12	33	47	−14	24	
9	FC Chiasso	26	7	8	11	31	34	−3	22	
10	FC Baden	26	7	8	11	35	34	+1	22	
11	FC Solothurn	26	8	5	13	27	36	−9	21	
12	SC Brühl	26	5	9	12	32	52	−20	19	
13	FC Le Locle	26	6	5	15	42	54	−12	17	Relegated to 1968–69 1. Liga
14	FC Blue Stars Zürich	26	5	6	15	28	47	−19	16	Relegated to 1968–69 1. Liga

Source: rsssf.com
Rules for classification: 1) Points; 2) Goal difference within the league, however with play-off for qualifiers;

== 1. Liga ==
=== Group West ===
Pos	Team	Pld	W	D	L	GF	GA	GD	Pts	Qualification or relegation
1	FC Fribourg	24	18	3	3	58	23	+35	39	Play-off to Nationalliga B
2	Etoile Carouge FC	24	14	6	4	52	22	+30	34	Play-off to Nationalliga B
3	FC Monthey	24	13	5	6	50	30	+20	31	
4	CS Chênois	24	11	5	8	36	29	+7	27	
5	Vevey-Sports	24	10	6	8	40	39	+1	26	
6	FC Martigny-Sports	24	6	12	6	36	40	−4	24	
7	FC Fontainemelon	24	7	8	9	44	44	0	22	
8	Yverdon-Sport FC	24	8	6	10	36	40	−4	22	
9	FC Raron	24	7	7	10	35	37	−2	21	
10	FC Versoix	24	6	8	10	30	42	−12	20	
11	FC Stade Lausanne	24	7	4	13	28	44	−16	18	
12	FC Forward Morges	24	7	2	15	28	49	−21	16	Relegation to 2. Liga Interregional
13	FC Assens	24	3	6	15	29	63	−34	12	Relegation to 2. Liga Interregional

Source: RSSSF
Rules for classification: 1) Points; 2) Goal difference within the league, but decider play-off for qualifiers.

=== Group Central ===
Pos	Team	Pld	W	D	L	GF	GA	GD	Pts	Qualification or relegation
1	FC Cantonal Neuchâtel	24	17	4	3	64	29	+35	38	Play-off to Nationalliga B
2	FC Bern	24	13	8	3	49	23	+26	34	Play-off to Nationalliga B
3	FC Porrentruy	24	14	3	7	47	34	+13	31	
4	FC Langenthal	24	13	4	7	45	29	+16	30	
5	FC Breitenbach	24	9	9	6	29	19	+10	27	
6	FC Minerva Bern	24	8	9	7	41	30	+11	25	
7	FC Concordia Basel	24	9	7	8	38	38	0	25	
8	FC Nordstern Basel	24	7	8	9	31	37	−6	22	
9	SC Burgdorf	24	6	8	10	30	31	−1	20	
10	FC Alle	24	5	9	10	29	45	−16	19	
11	FC Dürrenast	24	7	2	15	38	55	−17	16	Play-out against relegation
12	FC Olten	24	7	2	15	27	49	−22	16	Play-out against relegation
13	SR Delémont	24	3	3	18	26	75	−49	9	Relegation to 2. Liga Interregional

Source: RSSSF
Rules for classification: 1) Points; 2) Goal difference within the league, but decider play-off for qualifiers.

==== Decider for eleventh place ====
The decider was played on 4 June in Burgdorf.

Team 1	Score	Team 2
FC Dürrenast	2–0	FC Olten

FC Dürrenast win and remain in the division. FC Olten are relegated directly to 2. Liga Interregional.

=== Group South and East ===
Pos	Team	Pld	W	D	L	GF	GA	GD	Pts	Qualification or relegation
1	FC Frauenfeld	24	15	5	4	54	31	+23	35	Play-off to Nationalliga B
2	FC Küsnacht	24	13	5	6	34	22	+12	31	Play-off to Nationalliga B
3	FC Locarno	24	10	10	4	32	17	+15	30	
4	FC Emmenbrücke	24	11	5	8	43	26	+17	27	
5	SC Zug	24	9	7	8	39	33	+6	25	
6	FC Schaffhausen	24	7	9	8	27	29	−2	23	
7	FC Widnau	24	10	3	11	36	40	−4	23	
8	FC Vaduz	24	10	3	11	29	42	−13	23	
9	FC Uster	24	8	6	10	25	28	−3	22	
10	FC Amriswil	24	9	4	11	35	39	−4	22	
11	FC Red Star Zürich	24	9	3	12	42	41	+1	21	
12	FC Rorschach	24	6	7	11	28	38	−10	19	Relegation to 2. Liga Interregional
13	FC Wohlen	24	4	3	17	24	62	−38	11	Relegation to 2. Liga Interregional

Source: RSSSF
Rules for classification: 1) Points; 2) Goal difference within the league, but decider play-off for qualifiers.

=== Promotion play-off ===
The three group winners and the runners-up played a round-robin against the four teams who had not been in their group.

==== Matches ====
The first games were played on 4 June.

Team 1	Score	Team 2
FC Bern	4–2	Etoile Carouge FC
FC Küsnacht	0–0	FC Fribourg
FC Cantonal Neuchâtel	3–0	FC Frauenfeld

The second round was played on 11 June.

Team 1	Score	Team 2
Etoile Carouge FC	2–1	FC Küsnacht
FC Fribourg	2–1	FC Cantonal Neuchâtel
FC Frauenfeld	0–2	FC Bern

The next games were played on 18 June.

Team 1	Score	Team 2
FC Bern	2–1	FC Fribourg
FC Cantonal Neuchâtel	6–1	FC Küsnacht
FC Frauenfeld	2–3	Etoile Carouge FC

The final round were played on 25 June 1967.

Team 1	Score	Team 2
Etoile Carouge FC	1–1	FC Cantonal Neuchâtel
FC Fribourg	9–0	FC Frauenfeld
FC Küsnacht	1–1	FC Bern

==== Final table ====
Pos	Team	Pld	W	D	L	GF	GA	GD	Pts	Qualification
1	FC Bern	4	3	1	0	9	4	+5	7	1. Liga champions promoted to 1967–68 Nationalliga B
2	FC Fribourg	4	2	1	1	12	3	+9	5	Promoted to 1967–68 Nationalliga B
3	FC Cantonal Neuchâtel	4	2	1	1	11	4	+7	5	
4	Etoile Carouge FC	4	2	1	1	8	8	0	5	
5	FC Küsnacht	4	0	2	2	3	9	−6	2	
6	FC Frauenfeld	4	0	0	4	2	17	−15	0	

Source: RSSSF
Rules for classification: 1) Points; 2) Head-to-head points.

== Swiss Cup ==
The competition was played in a knockout system. In the case of a draw, extra time was played. If the teams were still level after extra time, the match was replayed at the away team's ground. In the replay, in case of a draw after extra time, it was to be decided with a penalty shoot-out.

=== Early rounds ===
The routes of the finalists to the final were:

- Third round: teams from the NLA with byes.
- Fourth round: Basel–Blue Stars ZH 6:0. Urania Genf–Lausanne 0:3.
- Fifth round: Basel–Zürich 3:2. Lausanne–La Chaux-de-Fonds 2:0.
- Quarter-finals: Basel–Biel 2:2 (a.e.t.), Replay: Biel–Basel 1:2. Winterthur-Lausanne 0:3.
- Semi-finals. Lugano–Basel 0:0 (a.e.t.), Replay: Basel–Lugano 2:1. Sion-Lausanne 0:1.

=== Final ===
The final was held in the former Wankdorf Stadium on Whit Monday 15 May 1967. The opponents were Basel and Lausanne-Sports. The game went down in football history due to the sit-down strike that followed a penalty goal shortly before the end of the match. After 88 minutes of play, with the score at 1–1, referee Karl Göppel awarded Basel a controversial penalty. André Grobéty had pushed Helmut Hauser gently in the back and he had let himself drop theatrically. Hauser scored the decisive penalty. Subsequent to the 2–1 lead for Basel the Lausanne players refused to resume the game and they sat down demonstratively on the pitch. The referee had to abandon the match. Basel were awarded the cup with a 3–0 forfeit.

15 May 1967
15:00

Basel	(2–1) 3–0 FF	Lausanne-Sports
Hauser 11' (1:0); Hauser 88' (pen. 2:1)	Summary; Fussball Schweiz	41' (o.g.) Josef Kiefer

Wankdorf Stadium, Bern
Attendance: 45,000
Referee: (Switzerland) Karl Göppel Zürich

The final was abandoned in 89' at 2-1 and awarded 3-0 in favour of Basel: Lausanne-Sports protested by a sit-in against the penalty decision that led to 2-1.

== Swiss Clubs in Europe ==
- Zürich as 1965–66 Nationalliga A champions: 1966–67 European Cup
- Servette as 1965–66 Swiss Cup runner-up: 1966–67 Cup Winners' Cup
- La Chaux-de-Fonds: entered 1966–67 Intertoto Cup
- Sion: entered 1966–67 Intertoto Cup
- Biel-Bienne: entered 1966–67 Intertoto Cup
- Grenchen: entered 1966–67 Intertoto Cup

=== Zürich ===
==== European Cup ====
===== First round =====
28 September 1966 First leg	Celtic (Scotland)	2–0	(Switzerland) FC Zürich	Celtic Park, Glasgow
	Bobby Murdoch (yellow card); Gemmell 61'; McBride 69'	UEFA report FCZ summary	(yellow card) 36' Stierli; (yellow card) 52' Künzli	Attendance: 47,604; Referee: Frede Hansen (Denmark)

5 October 1966 Second leg	FC Zürich (Switzerland)	0–3	(Scotland) Celtic	Letzigrund, Zürich
		UEFA report FCZ summary	Gemmell 22', 48' (pen.); Chalmers 39'	Attendance: 20,236; Referee: Concetto Lo Bello (Italy)

Celtic won 5–0 on aggregate.

=== Servette ===
==== Cup Winners' Cup ====
===== First round =====
Team 1	Agg.	Team 2	1st leg	2nd leg
Servette (Switzerland)	3–2	(Finland) Åbo IFK	1–1	2–1

===== Second round =====
Team 1	Agg.	Team 2	1st leg	2nd leg
Servette (Switzerland)	2–1	(Netherlands) Sparta Rotterdam	2–0	0–1

===== Quarter-final =====
Team 1	Agg.	Team 2	1st leg	2nd leg
Servette (Switzerland)	1–3	(Bulgaria) Slavia Sofia	1–0	0–3

=== La Chaux-de-Fonds ===
==== Intertoto Cup ====
===== Group A1 =====
Pos	Team	Pld	W	D	L	GF	GA	GD	Pts	EIN	VIC	FEY	CDF
1	(West Germany) Eintracht Frankfurt	6	5	0	1	15	9	+6	10	—	1–5	2–0	3–1
2	(Italy) Lanerossi Vicenza	6	2	1	3	10	11	−1	5	0–1	—	2–1	2–2
3	(Netherlands) Feyenoord	5	2	0	3	8	9	−1	4	1–4	2–0	—	4–1
4	(Switzerland) La Chaux-de-Fonds	5	1	1	3	10	14	−4	3	2–4	4–1	(Note: The match La Chaux-de-Fonds v Feyenoord was abandoned due to fog (the score at the time was 1–2). Since neither side could qualify, the match was not replayed nor the score allowed to stand.)	—

Source: mogiel.net
Rules for classification: 1) Points; 2) Goal difference; 3) Goals scored; 4) Head-to-head points; 5) Away goals scored; 6) Draw.

=== Sion ===
==== Intertoto Cup ====
===== Group A3 =====
Pos	Team	Pld	W	D	L	GF	GA	GD	Pts	GAE	FOG	TIL	SIO
1	(Netherlands) Go Ahead Eagles	6	6	0	0	24	8	+16	12	—	2–0	3–2	6–4
2	(Italy) Foggia	6	4	0	2	6	3	+3	8	0–1	—	1–0	3–0
3	(Belgium) Tilleur	6	2	0	4	10	13	−3	4	0–8	0–1	—	6–0
4	(Switzerland) Sion	6	0	0	6	6	22	−16	0	2–4	0–1	0–2	—

Source: mogiel.net
Rules for classification: 1) Points; 2) Goal difference; 3) Goals scored; 4) Head-to-head points; 5) Away goals scored; 6) Draw.

=== Biel-Bienne ===
==== Intertoto Cup ====
===== Group A4 =====
Pos	Team	Pld	W	D	L	GF	GA	GD	Pts	ADO	BRE	LIÈ	BIE
1	(Netherlands) ADO Den Haag	6	5	1	0	16	8	+8	11	—	2–0	2–1	4–2
2	(Italy) Brescia	6	3	1	2	9	5	+4	7	1–1	—	1–0	3–1
3	(Belgium) Liège	6	3	0	3	13	6	+7	6	1–2	1–0	—	7–0
4	(Switzerland) Biel-Bienne	6	0	0	6	7	26	−19	0	3–5	0–4	1–3	—

Source: mogiel.net
Rules for classification: 1) Points; 2) Goal difference; 3) Goals scored; 4) Head-to-head points; 5) Away goals scored; 6) Draw.

=== Grenchen ===
==== Intertoto Cup ====
===== Group A2 =====
Pos	Team	Pld	W	D	L	GF	GA	GD	Pts	DWS	ATA	GRE	STR
1	(Netherlands) DWS	6	6	0	0	17	7	+10	12	—	1–0	4–2	4–1
2	(Italy) Atalanta	6	3	0	3	14	7	+7	6	0–1	—	4–0	6–1
3	(Switzerland) Grenchen	6	2	0	4	14	20	−6	4	3–5	3–2	—	4–2
4	(France) Strasbourg	6	1	0	5	9	20	−11	2	1–2	1–2	3–2	—

Source: mogiel.net
Rules for classification: 1) Points; 2) Goal difference; 3) Goals scored; 4) Head-to-head points; 5) Away goals scored; 6) Draw.

== Sources ==
- Switzerland 1966–67 at RSSSF
- European Competitions 1967–68 at RSSSF.com
- Cup finals at Fussball-Schweiz
- Intertoto history at Pawel Mogielnicki's Page
- Josef Zindel (2018). FC Basel 1893. Die ersten 125 Jahre (in German). Basel: Friedrich Reinhardt Verlag. ISBN 978-3-7245-2305-5.

Preceded by 1965–66	Seasons in Swiss football	Succeeded by 1967–68

{{1966–67 in Swiss football}}
