= 1964–65 in Swiss football =

Football in Switzerland
- Season: 1964–65

Men's football
- Nationalliga A: Lausanne-Sport
- Nationalliga B: Urania Genève Sport
- 1. Liga: 1. Liga champions: St. Gallen; Group West: Etoile Carouge; Group Cenral: FC Langenthal; Group South and East: St. Gallen
- Swiss Cup: Sion

The following is a summary of the 1964–65 season of competitive football in Switzerland.

== Nationalliga A ==
=== Final league table ===
Pos	Team	Pld	W	D	L	GF	GA	GD	Pts	Qualification or relegation
1	Lausanne-Sport	26	15	6	5	61	32	+29	36	Swiss Champions, qualified for 1965–66 European Cup
2	Young Boys	26	14	4	8	59	43	+16	32	
3	Servette	26	14	3	9	59	30	+29	31	
4	Grasshopper Club	26	11	7	8	54	47	+7	29	Entered 1965–66 Intertoto Cup
5	Lugano	26	9	11	6	29	30	−1	29	Entered 1965–66 Intertoto Cup
6	La Chaux-de-Fonds	26	12	3	11	52	39	+13	27	Entered 1965–66 Intertoto Cup
7	Luzern	26	9	9	8	33	38	−5	27	Entered 1965–66 Intertoto Cup
8	Basel	26	11	5	10	44	54	−10	27	
9	Sion	26	10	5	11	42	34	+8	25	Swiss Cup winners, qualified for 1965–66 European Cup Winners' Cup
10	Zürich	26	8	7	11	41	38	+3	23	
11	Grenchen	26	6	9	11	35	43	−8	21	
12	Biel-Bienne	26	8	5	13	35	56	−21	21	
13	Bellinzona	26	5	9	12	21	42	−21	19	Relegated to 1965–66 Nationalliga B
14	Chiasso	26	6	5	15	22	61	−39	17	Relegated to 1965–66 Nationalliga B

Source: rsssf.com
Rules for classification: 1) Points; 2) Goal difference within the league, however with play-off for qualifiers;

== Nationalliga B ==
=== Final league table ===
Pos	Team	Pld	W	D	L	GF	GA	GD	Pts	Qualification or relegation
1	Urania Genève Sport	26	16	5	5	59	30	+29	37	NLB Champions and promoted to 1965–66 Nationalliga A
2	Young Fellows Zürich	26	14	6	6	48	32	+16	34	Promoted to 1965–66 Nationalliga A
3	FC Thun	26	11	8	7	60	52	+8	30	
4	FC Porrentruy	26	11	8	7	40	40	0	30	
5	FC Aarau	26	12	5	9	59	42	+17	29	
6	FC Cantonal Neuchâtel	26	12	4	10	49	39	+10	28	
7	FC Winterthur	26	11	6	9	43	40	+3	28	
8	SC Brühl	26	10	6	10	47	47	0	26	
9	FC Le Locle	26	10	6	10	48	50	−2	26	
10	FC Solothurn	26	9	5	12	42	48	−6	23	
11	FC Moutier	26	6	10	10	40	51	−11	22	
12	FC Baden	26	6	8	12	41	49	−8	20	
13	FC Bern	26	7	4	15	36	46	−10	18	Relegated to 1965–66 1. Liga
14	FC Schaffhausen	26	4	5	17	30	76	−46	13	Relegated to 1965–66 1. Liga

Source: rsssf.com
Rules for classification: 1) Points; 2) Goal difference within the league, however with play-off for qualifiers;

== 1. Liga ==
=== Group West ===
Pos	Team	Pld	W	D	L	GF	GA	GD	Pts	Qualification or relegation
1	Etoile Carouge FC	24	15	4	5	61	33	+28	34	Play-off to Nationalliga B
2	FC Fribourg	24	12	9	3	39	19	+20	33	To decider for second place
3	FC Forward Morges	24	14	5	5	47	31	+16	33	To decider for second place
4	FC Xamax	24	12	8	4	49	37	+12	32	
5	FC Raron	24	11	7	6	47	37	+10	29	
6	Vevey-Sports	24	10	5	9	55	52	+3	25	
7	CS Chênois	24	9	5	10	39	32	+7	23	
8	Yverdon-Sport FC	24	9	5	10	39	48	−9	23	
9	FC Versoix	24	6	7	11	36	46	−10	19	
10	FC Martigny-Sports	24	6	7	11	23	30	−7	19	
11	FC Stade Lausanne	24	7	5	12	40	56	−16	19	
12	ES FC Malley	24	5	6	13	38	52	−14	16	Relegation to 2. Liga Interregional
13	FC Renens	24	2	3	19	22	62	−40	7	Relegation to 2. Liga Interregional

Source: RSSSF
Rules for classification: 1) Points; 2) Goal difference within the league, but decider play-off for qualifiers.

==== Decider for second place ====
The decider match for second place was played on 6 June at Stade Municipal in Yverdon-les-Bains.

Team 1	Score	Team 2
FC Fribourg	3–0	FC Forward Morges

FC Fribourg win and advance to play-offs. FC Forward Morges remain in the division.

=== Group Central ===
Pos	Team	Pld	W	D	L	GF	GA	GD	Pts	Qualification or relegation
1	FC Langenthal	24	15	6	3	43	21	+22	36	Play-off to Nationalliga B
2	SC Burgdorf	24	16	3	5	50	23	+27	35	Play-off to Nationalliga B
3	FC Minerva Bern	24	14	6	4	45	21	+24	34	
4	SR Delémont	24	9	7	8	40	40	0	25	
5	FC Concordia Basel	24	8	6	10	39	39	0	22	
6	FC Emmenbrücke	24	8	6	10	38	40	−2	22	
7	FC Alle	24	9	4	11	39	43	−4	22	
8	FC Wohlen	24	10	2	12	45	50	−5	22	
9	FC Nordstern Basel	24	7	7	10	29	41	−12	21	
10	FC Olten	24	7	6	11	36	39	−3	20	
11	FC Fontainemelon	24	7	6	11	34	54	−20	20	
12	FC Breitenbach	24	7	3	14	46	50	−4	17	Relegation to 2. Liga Interregional
13	FC Gerlafingen	24	6	4	14	32	55	−23	16	Relegation to 2. Liga Interregional

Source: RSSSF
Rules for classification: 1) Points; 2) Goal difference within the league, but decider play-off for qualifiers.

=== Group South and East ===
Pos	Team	Pld	W	D	L	GF	GA	GD	Pts	Qualification or relegation
1	St. Gallen	24	16	4	4	79	41	+38	36	Play-off to Nationalliga B
2	FC Blue Stars Zürich	24	15	5	4	52	36	+16	35	Play-off to Nationalliga B
3	FC Wettingen	24	15	3	6	64	30	+34	33	
4	SC Zug	24	9	8	7	53	47	+6	26	
5	FC Red Star Zürich	24	10	6	8	48	43	+5	26	
6	FC Widnau	24	9	6	9	32	38	−6	24	
7	FC Oerlikon/Polizei ZH	24	9	5	10	43	49	−6	23	
8	FC Vaduz	24	9	4	11	44	62	−18	22	
9	FC Locarno	24	5	9	10	31	34	−3	19	
10	FC Dietikon	24	8	3	13	36	43	−7	19	
11	FC Rorschach	24	6	6	12	33	52	−19	18	
12	FC Bodio	24	5	7	12	37	54	−17	17	Relegation to 2. Liga Interregional
13	FC Turgi	24	4	6	14	30	53	−23	14	Relegation to 2. Liga Interregional

Source: RSSSF
Rules for classification: 1) Points; 2) Goal difference within the league, but decider play-off for qualifiers.

=== Promotion play-off ===
The three group winners and the runners-up played a round-robin against the four teams who had not been in their group. The teams did not play against the team that had been in the same group.

==== Matches ====
The first games were played on 13 June 1965.

Team 1	Score	Team 2
Burgdorf	3–0	Fribourg
Blue Stars	3–1	Etoile Carouge
Langenthal	1–1	St. Gallen

The second round was played on 20 June.

Team 1	Score	Team 2
Etoile Carouge	0–2	Langenthal
Fribourg	2–3	Blue Stars
St. Gallen	4–2	Burgdorf

The third round was played on 27 June.

Team 1	Score	Team 2
Burgdorf	1–2	Etoile Carouge
Langenthal	4–4	Blue Stars
St. Gallen	1–0	Fribourg

The final round was played on 4 July.

Team 1	Score	Team 2
Blue Stars	1–0	Burgdorf
Etoile Carouge	2–3	St. Gallen
Fribourg	0–3	Langenthal

==== Final league table ====
Pos	Team	Pld	W	D	L	GF	GA	GD	Pts	Qualification
1	St. Gallen	4	3	1	0	9	5	+4	7	1. Liga champions, promoted to 1965–66 Nationalliga B
2	FC Blue Stars Zürich	4	3	1	0	11	7	+4	7	Promoted to 1965–66 Nationalliga B
3	FC Langenthal	4	2	2	0	10	5	+5	6	
4	Etoile Carouge FC	4	1	0	3	5	9	−4	2	
5	SC Burgdorf	4	1	0	3	6	7	−1	2	
6	FC Fribourg	4	0	0	4	2	10	−8	0	

Source: RSSSF
Rules for classification: 1) Points; 2) Head-to-head points; 3) Goal difference.

St. Gallen were declaired 1. Liga champions due to their position in the regular season.

== Swiss Cup ==
The competition was played in a knockout system. In the case of a draw, extra time was played. If the teams were still level after extra time, the match was replayed at the away team's ground. In the replay, in case of a draw after extra time, a toss of the coin would decide which team progressed.

=== Early rounds ===
The routes of the finalists to the final were:

- Second round: teams from the NLA and NLB with byes.
- Third round: Renens-Sion 0:7. Servette-Vevey-Sports 12:2.
- Fourth round: Sion-Urania Genf 2:1. Grenchen-Servette 0:6.
- Fifth round: Sion-Young Fellows 2:0 (a.e.t.). Servette-Chiasso 8:0.
- Quarter-finals: Sion-Minerva Bern 4:1. Servette-Le Locle 2:1.
- Semi-finals: Basel-Sion 2:3. YB-Servette 0:2.

=== Final ===
The final was held in the former Wankdorf Stadium on Easter Monday 1965.

19 April 1965
15:00

Sion	2–1	Servette
Georgy 13'; Gasser 84'	Fussball Schweiz	89' Daina

Wankdorf Stadium, Bern
Attendance: 33,000
Referee: (Switzerland) Karl Keller (Basel)

Sion won the cup and this was the club's first cup title to this date.

== Swiss Clubs in Europe ==
- La Chaux-de-Fonds as 1963–64 Nationalliga A champions: 1964–65 European Cup and entered 1964–65 Intertoto Cup
- Lausanne-Sport as 1963–64 Swiss Cup winners: 1964–65 European Cup Winners' Cup and entered 1964–65 Intertoto Cup
- Grenchen: Entered 1964–65 Intertoto Cup
- Young Boys: Entered 1964–65 Intertoto Cup

=== La Chaux-de-Fonds ===
==== European Cup ====
===== Preliminary round =====
9 September 1964 First leg	Saint-Étienne (France)	2–2	(Switzerland) La Chaux-de-Fonds	Stade Geoffroy-Guichard, Saint-Étienne
18:00 CET	Mekhloufi 18'; Guy 60'	Report	Bertschi 32', 43'	Attendance: 17,412; Referee: Aníbal Oliveira (Portugal)

16 September 1964 Second leg	La Chaux-de-Fonds (Switzerland)	2–1	(France) Saint-Étienne	Stade de la Charrière, La Chaux-de-Fonds
21:30 CET	Skiba 46'; Trivellin 70'	Report	Guy 10'	Attendance: 9,242; Referee: Manuel Gómez Arribas (Spain)

La Chaux-de-Fonds won 4–3 on aggregate.

===== First round =====
4 November 1964 First leg	La Chaux-de-Fonds (Switzerland)	1–1	(Portugal) Benfica	Stade de la Charrière, La Chaux-de-Fonds
20:30 CET	Antenen 37'	Report	Torres 6'	Attendance: 6,482; Referee: Raoul Righi (Italy)

9 December 1964 Second leg	Benfica (Portugal)	5–0	(Switzerland) La Chaux-de-Fonds	Estádio da Luz, Lisbon
22:00 CET	Coluna 35'; Torres 40', 66', 85'; Eusébio 53'	Report		Attendance: 54,471; Referee: Michel Kitabdjian (France)

Benfica won 6–1 on aggregate.

==== Intertoto Cup ====
===== Group A2 =====
Pos	Team	Pld	W	D	L	GF	GA	GD	Pts	DWS	CDF	EIN	BER
1	(Netherlands) DWS	6	4	0	2	14	6	+8	8	—	1–2	4–0	5–0
2	(Switzerland) La Chaux-de-Fonds	6	3	1	2	9	10	−1	7	0–1	—	2–1	3–1
3	(West Germany) Eintracht Braunschweig	6	3	1	2	9	10	−1	7	2–0	1–1	—	2–1
4	(Belgium) Beringen	6	1	0	5	11	17	−6	2	2–3	5–1	2–3	—

Source: mogiel.net
Rules for classification: 1) Points; 2) Goal difference; 3) Goals scored; 4) Head-to-head points; 5) Draw.

=== Lausanne-Sport ===
==== Cup Winners' Cup ====
===== First round =====
2 September 1964 First leg	Lausanne Sports (Switzerland)	2–0	(Hungary) Budapest Honvéd	Stade Olympique de la Pontaise, Lausanne
	Kerkhoffs 62', 70'			Referee: Kurt Tschenscher (West Germany)

9 September 1964 Second leg	Budapest Honvéd (Hungary)	1–0	(Switzerland) Lausanne Sports	Népstadion, Budapest
	Vági 27'			Referee: Alojz Obtulovič (Czechoslovakia)

Lausanne Sports won 2–1 on aggregate.

===== Second round =====
18 November 1964 First leg	Slavia Sofia (Bulgaria)	1–0	(Switzerland) Lausanne Sports	Vasil Levski National Stadium, Sofia
	Vasilev 50'			Referee: Paul Bonett (Malta)

6 December 1964 Second leg	Lausanne Sports (Switzerland)	2–1	(Bulgaria) Slavia Sofia	Stade Olympique de la Pontaise, Lausanne
	Kerkhoffs 7'; Hosp 43'		Krastev 20'	Referee: Antonio Sbardella (Italy)

Lausanne Sports 2–2 Slavia Sofia on aggregate. A play-out on neutral grounds was required.

29 December 1964 Play out	Lausanne Sports (Switzerland)	3–2	(Bulgaria) Slavia Sofia	Stadio Flaminio, Rome
	Eschmann 30'; Kerkhoffs 35', 80'		Hristov 15'; Gugalov 70'	Referee: Antonio Sbardella (Italy)

Lausanne Sports won 3–2 in the play-off.

===== Quarter-finals =====
16 March 1965 First leg	Lausanne Sport (Switzerland)	1–2	(England) West Ham United	Stade Olympique de la Pontaise, Lausanne
	Hosp 80'		Dear 21'; Byrne 53'	Attendance: 20,000; Referee: Paul Schiller (Austria)

23 March 1965 Second leg	West Ham United (England)	4–3	(Switzerland) Lausanne Sport	Boleyn Ground, London
	Tacchella 42' (o.g.); Dear 43', 89'; Peters 59'		Kerkhoffs 37'; Hertig 48'; Eschmann 80'	Attendance: 31,780; Referee: Piet Roomer (Netherlands)

West Ham United won 6–4 on aggregate.

==== Intertoto Cup ====
===== Group A1 =====
Pos	Team	Pld	W	D	L	GF	GA	GD	Pts	HER	FEY	LS	STA
1	(West Germany) Hertha Berlin	6	2	3	1	12	12	0	7	—	1–0	4–4	2–1
2	(Netherlands) Feyenoord	6	2	2	2	9	7	+2	6	1–1	—	0–2	2–0
3	(Switzerland) Lausanne-Sports	6	1	4	1	14	14	0	6	3–3	3–3	—	1–1
4	(Belgium) Standard Liège	6	2	1	3	8	10	−2	5	3–1	0–3	3–1	—

Source: mogiel.net
Rules for classification: 1) Points; 2) Goal difference; 3) Goals scored; 4) Head-to-head points; 5) Draw.

=== Grenchen ===
==== Intertoto Cup ====
===== Group A3 =====
Pos	Team	Pld	W	D	L	GF	GA	GD	Pts	KAI	ENS	BEE	GRE
1	(West Germany) Kaiserslautern	6	4	2	0	8	0	+8	10	—	0–0	1–0	3–0
2	(Netherlands) Twente Enschede	6	2	3	1	11	7	+4	7	0–2	—	1–1	5–0
3	(Belgium) Beerschot	6	1	4	1	5	5	0	6	0–0	2–2	—	1–1
4	(Switzerland) Grenchen	6	0	1	5	3	15	−12	1	0–2	2–3	0–1	—

Source: mogiel.net
Rules for classification: 1) Points; 2) Goal difference; 3) Goals scored; 4) Head-to-head points; 5) Draw.

=== Young Boys ===
==== Intertoto Cup ====
===== Group A4 =====
Pos	Team	Pld	W	D	L	GF	GA	GD	Pts	LIÈ	NAC	YB	SAA
1	(Belgium) Liège	6	4	2	0	10	3	+7	10	—	0–0	3–3	3–0
2	(Netherlands) NAC Breda	6	3	2	1	17	8	+9	8	0–1	—	6–2	3–0
3	(Switzerland) Young Boys	6	1	2	3	13	21	−8	4	0–2	3–6	—	3–2
4	(West Germany) Saarbrücken	6	0	2	4	6	14	−8	2	0–1	2–2	2–2	—

Source: mogiel.net
Rules for classification: 1) Points; 2) Goal difference; 3) Goals scored; 4) Head-to-head points; 5) Draw.

== Sources ==
- Switzerland 1964–65 at RSSSF
- European Competitions 1964–65 at RSSSF.com
- Cup finals at Fussball-Schweiz
- Intertoto history at Pawel Mogielnicki's Page
- Josef Zindel (2018). FC Basel 1893. Die ersten 125 Jahre (in German). Basel: Friedrich Reinhardt Verlag. ISBN 978-3-7245-2305-5.

Preceded by 1963–64	Seasons in Swiss football	Succeeded by 1965–66

{{1964–65 in Swiss football}}
