= 1966–67 Swiss Cup =

Tournament details
- Country: Switzerland
- Teams: 114

Final positions
- Champions: FC Basel
- Runners-up: Lausanne-Sports

Tournament statistics
- Matches played: 125

The 1966–67 Swiss Cup was the 42nd season of Switzerland's annual cup competition, organised annually since 1925–26 by the Swiss Football Association.

== Overview ==
This season's cup competition began on the weekend of 10 and 11 September 1966, with the games of the first round. The competition was to be completed on Whit Monday 15 May 1967 with the final, which was traditionally held at the former Wankdorf Stadium in Bern. The clubs from this season's Nationalliga B (NLB) were given byes for the first two rounds and entered the competition in the third round. The clubs from this season's Nationalliga A (NLA) were granted byes for the first three rounds. These teams joined the competition in the fourth round, which was played on the 6 November.

The matches were played in a knockout format. In the event of a draw after 90 minutes, the match went into extra time. In the event of a draw at the end of extra time, a replay was foreseen and this was played on the visiting team's pitch. If the replay ended in a draw after extra time, a toss of a coin would decide the outcome of the encounter. The cup winners qualified themselves for the first round of the Cup Winners' Cup in the next season.

== First round ==
In the first phase, the first and second rounds, the lower league teams (1. Liga and lower) that had qualified themselves for the competition through their regional football association's regional cup competitions or through their association's requirements, competed here. The draw respected local regionalities. The first principal round was held on the week-end of 10 and 11 September.

=== Summary ===
Team 1	Score	Team 2
10 and 11 September 1966
FC Amriswil	3–1	FC Wattwil
FC Bonaduz	2–7	FC Rorschach
FC Widnau	4–1	Chur
Red Star	4–1	SC Schöftland
Uster	3–2	FC Oberwinterthur
FC Küsnacht ZH	0–3	Frauenfeld
FC Tössfeld	1–2	Schaffhausen
FC Altstetten (Zürich)	1–2	FC Dübendorf
FC Horgen	1–2	FC Dietikon
FC Bauma	2–1	FC Arbon
Bözingen 34	0–0 (a.e.t.)	Colombier
Alle	2–2 (a.e.t.)	FC Courtemaîche
Delémont	0–5	FC Porrentruy
FC Mett	0–1	FC Grünstern Ipsach
Burgdorf	0–2	Minerva Bern
Zähringia Bern	1–0	FC Langenthal
FC Olten	6–4	FC Selzach
FC Breitenbach	5–1	FC Welschenrohr
Black Stars	0–2	Nordstern
FC Breite Basel	0–1	Concordia
Old Boys	0–0 (a.e.t.)	Laufen
FC Turgi	3–0	SC Zofingen
Wohlen	1–4	FC Buchs AG
Emmenbrücke	2–0	Kickers Luzern
SC Zug	6–1	Kriens
Bodio	1–1 (a.e.t.)	FC Solduno
Mendrisiostar	0–1	Locarno
US Giubiasco	1–0	FC Riva san Vitale
FC Versoix	1–1 (a.e.t.)	CS International Genève
Etoile Carouge	5–1	FC Renens
Chênois	2–1	FC Vernier
FC Couvet	3–1	Yverdon-Sport
FC Assens	2–1	FC Orbe
FC Forward Morges	0–1	FC Chailly-sur-Lausanne
Vevey Sports	2–0	Stade Lausanne
FC Crissier	0–2	ES Malley
Martigny-Sports	3–0	FC Sierre
Montreux-Sports	4–2	Monthey
FC Raron	3–1	FC Saint-Maurice
Fribourg	8–2	FC Beauregard Fribourg
FC Fontainemelon	1–6	Cantonal Neuchâtel
17 September 1966
Vaduz	4–1	FC Lachen
Bern	3–1	Dürrenast
FC Portalban	0–3	FC Fétigny

Replays

Team 1	Score	Team 2
17 September 1966
Colombier	1–2	Bözingen 34
FC Courtemaîche	3–2	Alle
Laufen	1–0 (a.e.t.)	Old Boys
FC Solduno	1–2	Bodio
CS International Genève	3–2	FC Versoix

== Second round ==
=== Summary ===
Team 1	Score	Team 2
1 and 2 October 1966
FC Amriswil	2–3	FC Widnau
Uster	2–1	Vaduz
FC Buchs AG	3–6	FC Turgi
FC Fétigny	1–3	Cantonal Neuchâtel
FC Couvet	0–1	Fribourg
Bern	5–2	FC Olten
Emmenbrücke	3–0	US Giubiasco
Schaffhausen	0–2	Red Star
Locarno	0–2	Bodio
Zähringia Bern	2–3	Grünstern Ipsach
CS International Genève	1–4	Etoile Carouge
FC Porrentruy	4–0	FC Courtemaîche
Minerva Bern	4–1	FC Bözingen 34
Martigny-Sports	3–4	Vevey Sports
Chênois	2–1 (a.e.t.)	FC Assens
Montreux-Sports	1–0	FC Raron
Nordstern	5–1	Laufen
Concordia	2–0	FC Breitenbach
FC Dietikon	3–4 (a.e.t.)	FC Dübendorf
ES Malley	3–0	FC Chailly-sur-Lausanne
SC Zug	1–2	Frauenfeld
FC Rorschach	2–1	FC Bauma

== Third round ==
The Nationalliga B teams joined the competition in the third round. The teams from the Nationalliga A were granted byes in this round.

=== Summary ===
Team 1	Score	Team 2
22 and 23 October 1966
Blue Stars	4–2 (a.e.t.)	FC Widnau
Uster	2–1 (a.e.t.)	SC Brühl
FC Turgi	2–1	Baden
Thun	5–3	Cantonal Neuchâtel
Fribourg	4–1	Bern
Emmenbrücke	0–1	Luzern
Chiasso	7–1	Red Star
Bellinzona	6–0	Bodio
Grünstern Ipsach	0–0 (a.e.t.)	Solothurn
Neuchâtel Xamax	3–2	Etoile Carouge
FC Porrentruy	0–1	Minerva Bern
Vevey Sports	2–2 (a.e.t.)	Wettingen
FC Le Locle	5–1	Montreux-Sports
Nordstern	1–1 (a.e.t.)	Wettingen
Aarau	6–0	Concordia
St. Gallen	5–3 (a.e.t.)	FC Dübendorf
Urania Genève Sport	3–1	ES Malley
Frauenfeld	8–0	FC Rorschach

Replays

Team 1	Score	Team 2
26 October 1966
Wettingen	5–3 (a.e.t.)	Nordstern
26 October 1966
Solothurn	1–2	Grünstern Ipsach
30 October 1966
Chênois	0–1 (a.e.t.)	Vevey Sports

== Fourth round ==
The top-tier Nationalliga A teams joined the competition in the fourth round.

=== Summary ===
Team 1	Score	Team 2
6 November 1966
FC Uster	0–4	Zürich
Lugano	PP	FC Turgi
Thun	1–2 (a.e.t.)	Servette
Sion	1–0	Fribourg
Luzern	PP	Chiasso
Bellinzona	PP	Young Fellows
Grünstern Ipsach	1–3	Neuchâtel Xamax
Biel-Bienne	2–0	Minerva Bern
Grenchen	7–1	Vevey Sports
FC Le Locle	3–0	Moutier
Grasshopper Club	6–2	Wettingen
La Chaux-de-Fonds	2–0	Aarau
St. Gallen	1–2	Young Boys
Urania Genève Sport	0–3	Lausanne-Sport
Winterthur	3–0	Frauenfeld
Basel	6–0	Blue Stars
11 December 1966
Lugano	4–0	FC Turgi
Luzern	5–1	Chiasso
Bellinzona	3–0	Young Fellows

=== Matches ===
6 November 1966

FC Uster	0–4	Zürich
	FCZ summary	24' Künzli; 45' Rütti; 65' Rütti; 89' Künzli

Sportplatz Oberuster, Uster
Attendance: 3,000
Referee: (Switzerland) Roland Marendaz

6 November 1966
14:15
Round of 32

Basel	6–0	Blue Stars
Frigerio 37' (1:0); Frigerio 41' (2:0); Moscatelli 44' (3:0); Stocker 52' (4:0); Frigerio 63' (5:0); Pfirter 87' (6:0)	FCB summary

Landhof, Basel
Attendance: 2,200
Referee: (Switzerland) Strässle Steinach

== Fifth round ==
=== Summary ===
Team 1	Score	Team 2
11 December 1966
Basel	3–2	Zürich
Grenchen	0–1	Biel-Bienne
FC Le Locle	1–4	Grasshopper Club
Winterthur	3–1	Young Boys
Lausanne-Sport	2–0	La Chaux-de-Fonds
18 December 1966
Lugano	1–0	Servette
AC Bellinzona	4–1	Neuchâtel Xamax
Sion	3–0 (abd 79')	Luzern

- The match Sion–Luzern was abandoned in the 79th minute and was then award forfeit 3–0 to Sion.

=== Matches ===
11 December 1966
14:30

Basel	3–2	Zürich
Vetter 13' (1:0); Moscatelli (yellow card) 44'; Hauser 72' (2:2); Hauser 79' (3:2)	FCB summary FCZ summary	62' (1:1) Trivellin; 71' (pen. 1:2) Neumann; (yellow card) 84' Stierli

St. Jakob Stadium, Basel
Attendance: 22,000
Referee: (Switzerland) Anton Bucheli (Luzern)

== Quarter-finals ==
=== Summary ===
Team 1	Score	Team 2
5 March 1967
Basel	2–2 (a.e.t.)	Biel-Bienne
Grasshopper Club	0–0 (a.e.t.)	Lugano
FC Sion	4–0	AC Bellinzona
FC Winterthur	0–3	Lausanne-Sport

Replays

Team 1	Score	Team 2
8 March 1967
Lugano	5–0	Grasshopper Club
Biel-Bienne	1–2	Basel

=== Matches ===
4 March 1967

Basel	2–2 (a.e.t.)	Biel-Bienne
Frigerio 27' (1:0); Stocker 58' (pen. 2:1)	FCB summary	46' (1:1) Graf; 77' (2:2) Leu

St. Jakob Stadium, Basel
Attendance: 12,000
Referee: (Switzerland) Strässle (Steinach)

8 March 1967
20:15
Replay

Biel-Bienne	1–2	Basel
Bai 31' (1:1)	FCB summary	17' (0:1) Hauser; 59' (1:2) Frigerio

Gurzelen Stadion, Biel
Attendance: 12,500
Referee: (Switzerland) Karl Göppel (Zürich)

== Semi-finals ==
=== Summary ===
Team 1	Score	Team 2
27 March 1967
Sion	0–1	Lausanne-Sports
Lugano	2–2 (a.e.t.)	Basel

Replay

Team 1	Score	Team 2
12 April 1967
Basel	2–1	Lugano

=== Matches ===
27 March 1967
Semi-final

Sion	0–1	Lausanne-Sports
		3' (0:1) Chapuisat

Parc des sports (Tourbillon), Sion

27 March 1967
Semi-final

Lugano	0–0 (a.e.t.)	Basel
	FCB summary

Stadio Cornaredo, Lugano
Attendance: 16,000
Referee: (Switzerland) Josef Zibung (Luzern)

12 April 1967
20:00
Replay

Basel	2–1	Lugano
Odermatt 12' (1:0); Benthaus 73' (2:1)	FCB summary	41' (1:1) Luttrop

St. Jakob Stadium, Basel
Attendance: 21,000
Referee: (Switzerland) Gilbert Droz (Marin)

== Final ==
The final was held in the former Wankdorf Stadium on 15 May 1967. The opponents were FC Basel and Lausanne-Sports. The game went down in football history due to the sit-down strike that followed a penalty goal shortly before the end of the match. After 88 minutes of play, with the score at 1–1, referee Karl Göppel awarded Basel a controversial penalty. André Grobéty had pushed Helmut Hauser gently in the back and he had let himself drop theatrically. Hauser scored the decisive penalty. Subsequent to the 2–1 lead for Basel the Lausanne players refused to resume the game and they sat down demonstratively on the pitch. The referee had to abandon the match. Basel were awarded the cup with a 3–0 forfeit.

=== Summary ===
Team 1	Score	Team 2
15 May 1967
Basel	2–1	Lausanne-Sports

=== Telegram ===
15 May 1967
15:00
Final

Basel	2–1	Lausanne-Sports
Hauser 11', 88' (pen.)	FCB summary Fussball-Schweiz summary	Kiefer 41' (o.g.)

Wankdorf Stadium, Bern
Attendance: 45,000
Referee: (Switzerland) Karl Göppel (Zürich)

The winners were to be qualified for the 1967–68 Cup Winners' Cup. However, because FCB were the 1966–67 Nationalliga A champions they qualified for the 1967–68 European Cup and so Lausanne-Sports qualified as rummers-up for the Cup Winners' Cup. This was FCB's fourth cup title and their first domestic double.

== Further in Swiss football ==
- 1966–67 Nationalliga A
- 1966–67 Swiss 1. Liga

== Sources ==
- Rotblau: Jahrbuch Saison 2014/2015. Publisher: FC Basel Marketing AG. ISBN 978-3-7245-2027-6
- Die ersten 125 Jahre / 2018. Publisher: Josef Zindel im Friedrich Reinhardt Verlag, Basel. ISBN 978-3-7245-2305-5
- Switzerland 1966–67 at RSSSF
- Official site (in German)

Preceded by 1965–66	Swiss Cup seasons	Succeeded by 1967–68
