= Ukoh =

Ukoh is a surname. Notable people with the surname include:

- Adaora Ukoh (born 1976), Nigerian actress
- Steven Ukoh (born 1991), Swiss footballer
