= 1965–66 Swiss Cup =

Tournament details
- Country: Switzerland

Final positions
- Champions: Zürich
- Runners-up: Servette

The 1965–66 Swiss Cup was the 41st season of Switzerland's football cup competition, organised annually since 1925–26 by the ASF/SFV.

== Overview ==
This season's cup competition began on the weekend of 11 and 12 September 1965, with the games of the first round. The competition was to be completed on Easter Monday 11 April 1966 with the final, which was traditionally held at the former Wankdorf Stadium in Bern. The clubs from this season's Nationalliga B (NLB) were given byes for the first two rounds and entered the competition in the third round. The clubs from this season's Nationalliga A (NLA) were granted byes for the first three rounds. These teams joined the competition in the fourth round, which was played on the week-end of 6 and 7 November.

The matches were played in a knockout format. In the event of a draw after 90 minutes, the match went into extra time. In the event of a draw at the end of extra time, a replay was foreseen and this was played on the visiting team's pitch. If the replay ended in a draw after extra time, a toss of a coin would decide the outcome of the encounter. The cup winners qualified themselves for the first round of the Cup Winners' Cup in the next season.

== Round 1 ==
In the first phase, the first and second rounds, the lower league teams (1. Liga and lower) that had qualified themselves for the competition through their regional football association's regional cup competitions or their association's requirements, competed here. Whenever possible, the draw respected local regionalities. The first round was played on the weekend of 11 and 12 September 1965.

=== Summary ===
Team 1	Score	Team 2
11 and 12 September 1965
FC Rorschach	4–3	Kreuzlingen
FC Arbon	0–4	Vaduz
Frauenfeld	1–0	FC Küsnacht
Chur	3–2 (a.e.t.)	Schaffhausen
FC Uznach	1–0	FC Widnau
Ballspielclub Zürich	0–7	FC Amriswil
FC Turicum	2–1	Uster
FC Oerlikon ZH	4–3	FC Dübendorf
FC Dietikon	2–0	FC Tössfeld Winterthur
FC Horgen	1–9	Red Star
Polizei Zürich	3–0	FC Lachen
Alle	5–1	FC Devellier
SC Aegerten Brügg	2–2 (a.e.t.)	FC Fontainemelon
FC Bözingen 34	2–2 (a.e.t.)	US Bienne-Boujean
Burgdorf	2–3	SC Sparta Bern
Minerva Bern	4–3	FC Victoria Bern
FC Ostermundigen	1–7	FC Langenthal
FC Olten	7–0	FC Subingen
FC Trimbach	0–0 (a.e.t.)	FC Gerlafingen
Fulgor Grenchen	1–2	Bern
Concordia	1–2	FC Birsfelden
Nordstern	5–1	FC Aesch
FC Breitenbach	2–3	Delémont
FC Oberdorf	1–2	Wettingen
Wohlen	9–0	FC Sursee
FC Buchs	1–3	FC Turgi
Kriens	5–1	Schötz
Buochs	2–3	Emmenbrücke
FC Mezzovicco	2–2 (a.e.t.)	Locarno
Mendrisio	3–1	FC Rapid Lugano
FC Solduno	0–1	SC Zug
Bulle	5–4	Vevey Sports
FC Fétigny	4–0	Yverdon-Sport
Fribourg	3–0	FC Richemond Fribourg
FC Hauterive	0–1	Stade Lausanne
Montreux-Sports	1–0	FC Lutry
Bavois	1–1 (a.e.t.)	FC Forward Morges
Colombier	2–1	Neuchâtel Xamax
Etoile Carouge	6–0	FC Renens
FC Plan-les-Ouates	2–4 (a.e.t.)	Chênois
FC Concordia Lausanne	1–4	FC Versoix
FC Star Sécheron	0–6	Meyrin
FC Visp	0–1	FC Raron
Martigny-Sports	0–1	Monthey

Replays

Team 1	Score	Team 2
19 September 1965
FC Fontainemelon	3–0	SC Aegerten Brügg
US Bienne-Boujean	4–0	FC Bözingen 34
FC Gerlafingen	3–2	FC Trimbach
FC Forward Morges	6–0	Bavois
22 September 1965
Locarno	2–1	FC Mezzovicco

== Round 2 ==
=== Summary ===
Team 1	Score	Team 2
2 and 3 October 1965
Frauenfeld	4–1	FC Rorschach
FC Amriswil	3–1 (a.e.t.)	FC Uznach
Vaduz	0–3	Chur
Red Star	2–1 (a.e.t.)	Emmenbrücke
FC Dietikon	2–1	Polizei Zürich
FC Oerlikon	2–1	FC Turgi
Wettingen	3–0	FC Turicum
US Bienne-Boujean	4–2	SC Sparta Bern
Bern	2–0	Minerva Bern
Colombier	0–4	FC Fontainemelon
FC Olten	1–3	FC Langenthal
FC Birsfelden	2–0	Delémont
Alle	4–3	Nordstern
Wohlen	2–1	FC Gerlafingen
Kriens	1–3	SC Zug
Mendrisio	0–4	Locarno
Stade Lausanne	0–1	Étoile-Sporting
FC Forward Morges	1–2	Chênois
Meyrin	2–1 (a.e.t.)	FC Versoix
FC Raron	1–3	Monthey
FC Fétigny	2–1	Fribourg
Montreux-Sports	1–2	Bulle

== Round 3 ==
The teams from the NLB entered the cup competition in this round. However, they were seeded and could not be drawn against each other. Whenever possible, the draw respected local regionalities. The lower-tier team in each encounter was granted home advantage, if they so wished. The third round was played on the week-end of 16 and 17 October.

=== Summary ===
Team 1	Score	Team 2
16 and 17 October 1965
Wohlen	1–0	Locarno
FC Dietikon	1–6	Blue Stars
Winterthur	5–1	FC Oerlikon ZH
Bellinzona	4–1	Red Star
US Bienne-Boujean	0–1	Thun
Etoile Carouge	1–1 (a.e.t.)	Cantonal Neuchâtel
Chênois	2–1	FC Fétigny
FC Le Locle-Sports	5–1	Bulle
Chiasso	1–0	SC Zug
FC Amriswil	0–8	Brühl
Alle	0–2	FC Porrentruy
Bern	0–4	Solothurn
FC Langenthal	1–2	Aarau
St. Gallen	5–3	Wettingen
Baden	3–2	FC Birsfelden
Meyrin	6–0	Monthey
Chur	0–1	Frauenfeld
FC Fontainemelon	4–2 (a.e.t.)	Moutier

Replay

Team 1	Score	Team 2
20 October 1965
Cantonal Neuchâtel	2–1	Etoile Carouge

=== Matches ===
17 October 1965

FC Langenthal	1–2	Aarau
Goal	FCA summary	Goal

Rankmatte, Langenthal

== Round 4 ==
The teams from the NLA entered the cup competition in the fourth round, they were seeded and could not be drawn against each other. The draw was still respecting regionalities, but the lower-tier team was not automatically granted home advantage. The fourth round was played on the week-end of 6 and 7 November.

=== Summary ===
Team 1	Score	Team 2
6 and 7 November 1965
Lugano	5–2	Wohlen
Blue Stars	1–6	Zürich
Winterthur	0–2	Bellinzona
Thun	2–1 abd at 86' *	Grenchen
Cantonal Neuchâtel	2–0	Chênois
Grasshopper Club	1–2 (a.e.t.)	Young Fellows
Sion	0–1	Le Locle-Sports
Chiasso	1–2 (a.e.t.)	Brühl
FC Porrentruy	2–5	Young Boys
Solothurn	5–1	Aarau
Basel	3–1	Biel-Bienne
Luzern	3–1	Frauenfeld
Servette	5–2	FC Fontainemelon
Urania Genève Sport	1–5	Lausanne-Sport
St. Gallen	2–1	Baden
Meyrin	1–2	La Chaux-de-Fonds

- The match Thun–Grenchen was abandoned after 86 minutes, as Grenchen placed a protest. The protest was, later, refused and FC Thun were awarded the match forfeit 3–0 by the ASF/SFV and thus they qualified for the next round.

=== Matches ===
7 November 1965

Blue Stars	1–6	Zürich
Max Brun 58' (1:4)	FCZ summary	15' (0:1) Bäni; 24' (0:2) Martinelli; 25' (0:3) Stürmer; 50' (o.g.); 65' (1:5) Meyer; 70' (1:6) Leimgruber

Hardturm, Zürich
Attendance: 4,000
Referee: (Switzerland) Mario Clematide (Zollikofen)

7 November 1965

Solothurn	5–1	Aarau
Goal	FCA summary	Goal

Brühlstrasse (Stadion FC Solothurn), Solothurn

7 November 1965
14:30

Basel	3–1	Biel-Bienne
Frigerio 32' (1:0); Frigerio 80' (2:1); Hauser 82' (3:1)	FCB summary	74' (1:1) Stäuble

Landhof, Basel
Attendance: 6,000
Referee: (Switzerland) Anton Bucheli (Luzern)

7 November 1965

Servette	5–2	FC Fontainemelon
2x Georgy; 3x Daina	Servette summary	Goal

Stade des Charmilles, Geneva

== Round 5 ==
=== Summary ===
Team 1	Score	Team 2
18 and 19 December 1965
Lugano	1–2	Zürich
Bellinzona	2–2 (a.e.t.)	Thun
Cantonal Neuchâtel	2–1	Young Fellows
Le Locle-Sports	1–3	Brühl
Young Boys	5–1	Solothurn
Basel	3–1	Luzern
Servette	1–0	Lausanne-Sport
St. Gallen	1–2	La Chaux-de-Fonds

Replay

Team 1	Score	Team 2
26 December 1965
Thun	2–3	Bellinzona

=== Matches ===
19 December 1965

Lugano	1–2	Zürich
Flavio Signorelli 46' (1:1)	FCZ summary	12' (pen.) Brodmann; 87' (1:2) Künzli

Cornaredo Stadium, Lugano
Attendance: 11,000
Referee: (Switzerland) Othmar Huber (Thun)

19 December 1965
14:30

Basel	3–1	Luzern
Frigerio 53' (1:0); Frigerio 72' (2:1); Stocker 84' (3:1)	FCB summary	64' (1:1) Borchert

Landhof, Basel
Attendance: 8,500
Referee: (Switzerland) Karl Göppel (Zürich)

19 December 1965

Servette	1–0	Lausanne-Sport
Németh (1:0)	Servette summary

Stade des Charmilles, Geneva

== Quarter-finals ==
=== Summary ===
Team 1	Score	Team 2
27 February 1966
Zürich	5–1	Bellinzona
Cantonal Neuchâtel	3–2	Brühl
Young Boys	1–2	Basel
Servette	2–1	La Chaux-de-Fonds

=== Matches ===
27 February 1966

Zürich	5–1	Bellinzona
Brodmann 17' (1:0); Stürmer 20' (2:0); Stürmer 27' (3:0); Kuhn 66' (4:1); Brodmann 78' (pen.)	FCZ summary	53' (3:1) Guidotti

Letzigrund, Zürich
Attendance: 5,700
Referee: (Switzerland)

27 February 1966
14:30

Young Boys	1–2	Basel
Theunissen 50' (1:1)	Summary	10' (0:1) Frigerio; 87' (1:2) Frigerio

Wankdorf Stadium, Bern
Attendance: 15,000
Referee: (Switzerland) Strässle (Steinach)

27 February 1966

Servette	2–1	La Chaux-de-Fonds
Dezsö Didier Makay; Németh	Servette summary	Goal

Stade des Charmilles, Geneva

== Semi-finals ==
=== Summary ===
Team 1	Score	Team 2
20 March 1966
Zürich	4–2	Cantonal Neuchâtel
Basel	1–3	Servette

=== Matches ===
20 March 1966

Zürich	4–2	Cantonal Neuchâtel
Stürmer 5' (1:0); Martinelli 18' (2:0); Brodmann 22' (pen.); Künzli 54' (4:1)	FCZ summary	48' (3:1) Pigueron; 83' (pen.) Savary

Letzigrund, Zürich
Attendance: 3,700
Referee: (Switzerland) Eugen Boller (Bottmingen)

20 March 1966
15:00

Basel	1–3	Servette
Hauser 7' (1:1)	FCB summary Servette summary	3' (0:1) Németh; 45' (1:2) Jacques «Jacky» Bédert; 88' (1:3) Daina

Landhof, Basel
Attendance: 17,000
Referee: (Switzerland) Othmar Huber (Thun)

== Final ==
The final was held at the former Wankdorf Stadium in Bern on Easter Monday 1966.

=== Summary ===
Team 1	Score	Team 2
11 April 1966
Servette	0–2	Zürich

=== Telegram ===
11 April 1966
15:00

Servette	0–2	Zürich
	Fussball-Schweiz summary FCZ summary	Winiger 32' (0:2); Künzli 65' (0:2)

Wankdorf Stadium, Bern
Attendance: 53,435
Referee: (Switzerland) Anton Bucheli (Luzern)

Zürich won the cup and this was the club's very first cup title to this date. As they also won the 1965–66 Nationalliga A to become Swiss champions (for the fourth time), this was their first the domenstic double.

== Further in Swiss football ==
- 1965–66 Nationalliga A
- 1965–66 Swiss 1. Liga

== Sources ==
- Fussball-Schweiz
- FCB Cup games 1967–68 at fcb-achiv.ch
- Switzerland 1965–66 at RSSSF

Preceded by 1964–65	Swiss Cup seasons	Succeeded by 1966–67
