= 1965–66 Swiss 1. Liga =

1. Liga
- Season: 1965–66
- Champions: 1. Liga champions: FC Wettingen; Group West: Etoile Carouge; Group Cenral: FC Langenthal; Group South and East: FC Wettingen
- Promoted: FC Wettingen; FC Xamax
- Relegated: Group West: FC Meyrin; FC Montreux-Sports; Group Central: FC Trimbach; US Bienne-Boujean; Group South and East: FC Dietikon; FC Oerlikon/Polizei ZH
- Matches: 3 times 156 and 1 decider plus 12 play-offs

The 1965–66 1. Liga season was the 34th season of the 1. Liga since its creation in 1931. At this time, the 1. Liga was the third-tier of the Swiss football league system and it was the highest level of total amateur football. At this time, most of the teams in the top two tiers were professional or at least semi-professional.

== Format ==
There were 39 teams competing in the 1. Liga 1965–66 season. They were divided into three regional groups, each group with 13 teams. Within each group, the teams would play a double round-robin to decide their league position. Two points were awarded for a win. The three group winners and the three runners-up then contested a play-off round to decide the two promotion slots. The last two placed teams in each group were relegated to the 2. Liga (fourth tier).

== Group West ==
=== Teams, locations ===
Club	Based in	Canton	Stadium	Capacity
CS Chênois	Thônex	Geneva	Stade des Trois-Chêne	8,000
Étoile Carouge FC	Carouge	Geneva	Stade de la Fontenette	3,690
FC Fribourg	Fribourg	Fribourg	Stade Universitaire	9,000
FC Martigny-Sports	Martigny	Valais	Stade d'Octodure	2,500
FC Meyrin	Meyrin	Geneva	Stade des Arbères	9,000
FC Montreux-Sports	Montreux	Vaud	Stade de Chailly	1,000
FC Forward Morges	Morges	Vaud	Parc des Sports	600
FC Raron	Raron	Valais	Sportplatz Rhoneglut	1,000
FC Stade Lausanne	Ouchy, Lausanne	Vaud	Centre sportif de Vidy	1,000
FC Versoix	Versoix	Geneva	Centre sportif de la Bécassière	1,000
Vevey Sports	Vevey	Vaud	Stade de Copet	4,000
Xamax	Neuchâtel	Neuchâtel	Stade de la Maladière	25,500
Yverdon-Sport FC	Yverdon-les-Bains	Vaud	Stade Municipal	6,600

=== Final league table ===
Pos	Team	Pld	W	D	L	GF	GA	GD	Pts	Qualification or relegation
1	Etoile Carouge FC	24	16	5	3	54	21	+33	37	Play-off to Nationalliga B
2	Xamax	24	11	10	3	47	23	+24	32	Play-off to Nationalliga B
3	FC Fribourg	24	11	6	7	52	29	+23	28	
4	CS Chênois	24	10	8	6	39	34	+5	28	
5	FC Versoix	24	10	7	7	38	31	+7	27	
6	Yverdon-Sport FC	24	11	3	10	44	37	+7	25	
7	FC Raron	24	9	6	9	34	40	−6	24	
8	FC Stade Lausanne	24	9	5	10	41	47	−6	23	
9	Vevey-Sports	24	9	3	12	39	41	−2	21	
10	FC Forward Morges	24	7	6	11	25	34	−9	20	
11	FC Martigny-Sports	24	7	4	13	25	54	−29	18	
12	FC Meyrin	24	6	5	13	30	38	−8	17	Relegation to 2. Liga Interregional
13	FC Montreux-Sports	24	4	4	16	29	68	−39	12	Relegation to 2. Liga Interregional

Source: RSSSF
Rules for classification: 1) Points; 2) Goal difference within the league, but decider play-off for qualifiers.

== Group Central ==
=== Teams, locations ===
Club	Based in	Canton	Stadium	Capacity
FC Alle	Alle	Jura	Centre Sportif Régional	2,000
FC Bern	Bern	Bern	Stadion Neufeld	14,000
US Bienne-Boujean	Biel/Bienne	Bern		
SC Burgdorf	Burgdorf	Bern	Stadion Neumatt	3,850
FC Concordia Basel	Basel	Basel-Stadt	Stadion Rankhof	7,000
SR Delémont	Delémont	Jura	La Blancherie	5,263
FC Fontainemelon	Neuchâtel	Neuchâtel	Centre Sportif Fontainemelon	1,000
FC Langenthal	Langenthal	Bern	Rankmatte	2,000
FC Minerva Bern	Bern	Bern	Spitalacker	1,450
FC Nordstern Basel	Basel	Basel-Stadt	Rankhof	7,600
FC Olten	Olten	Solothurn	Sportanlagen Kleinholz	8,000
FC Trimbach|	Trimbach	Solothurn	Sportanlage Leinfeld	400
FC Wohlen	Wohlen	Aargau	Stadion Niedermatten	3,734

=== Final league table ===
Pos	Team	Pld	W	D	L	GF	GA	GD	Pts	Qualification or relegation
1	FC Langenthal	24	18	4	2	73	21	+52	40	Play-off to Nationalliga B
2	FC Olten	24	14	4	6	39	27	+12	32	Play-off to Nationalliga B
3	FC Concordia Basel	24	12	3	9	59	44	+15	27	
4	FC Bern	24	12	3	9	58	46	+12	27	
5	FC Wohlen	24	12	3	9	48	40	+8	27	
6	SC Burgdorf	24	11	4	9	40	34	+6	26	
7	FC Minerva Bern	24	8	6	10	44	39	+5	22	
8	FC Fontainemelon	24	9	5	10	39	46	−7	23	
9	SR Delémont	24	9	3	12	49	61	−12	21	
10	FC Alle	24	9	2	13	40	50	−10	20	
11	FC Nordstern Basel	24	8	3	13	26	49	−23	19	
12	FC Trimbach	24	6	4	14	25	49	−24	16	Relegation to 2. Liga Interregional
13	US Bienne-Boujean	24	3	6	15	31	65	−34	12	Relegation to 2. Liga Interregional

Source: RSSSF
Rules for classification: 1) Points; 2) Goal difference within the league, but decider play-off for qualifiers.

== Group South and East ==
=== Teams, locations ===
Club	Based in	Canton	Stadium	Capacity
FC Amriswil	Amriswil	Thurgau	Tellenfeld	1,000
FC Dietikon	Dietikon	Zürich	Fussballplatz Dornau	1,000
FC Emmenbrücke	Emmen	Lucerne	Stadion Gersag	8,700
FC Küsnacht	Küsnacht	Zürich	Sportanlage Heslibach	2,300
FC Locarno	Locarno	Ticino	Stadio comunale Lido	5,000
FC Oerlikon/Polizei ZH	Oerlikon (Zürich)	Zürich	Sportanlage Neudorf	1,000
FC Red Star Zürich	Zürich	Zürich	Allmend Brunau	2,000
FC Rorschach	Rorschach	Schwyz	Sportplatz Kellen	1,000
FC Schaffhausen	Schaffhausen	Schaffhausen	Stadion Breite	7,300
FC Vaduz	Vaduz	Liechtenstein	Rheinpark Stadion	7,584
FC Wettingen	Wettingen	Aargau	Stadion Altenburg	10,000
FC Widnau	Windnau	St. Gallen	Sportanlage Aegeten	2,000
SC Zug	Zug	Zug	Herti Allmend Stadion	6,000

=== Final league table ===
Pos	Team	Pld	W	D	L	GF	GA	GD	Pts	Qualification or relegation
1	FC Wettingen	24	17	3	4	61	15	+46	37	Play-off to Nationalliga B
2	SC Zug	24	11	8	5	33	28	+5	30	Play-off to Nationalliga B
3	FC Küsnacht	24	9	8	7	29	23	+6	26	
4	FC Vaduz	24	11	4	9	54	53	+1	26	
5	FC Locarno	24	7	11	6	24	19	+5	25	
6	FC Red Star Zürich	24	10	4	10	39	36	+3	24	
7	FC Emmenbrücke	24	8	8	8	37	37	0	24	
8	FC Schaffhausen	24	8	7	9	32	40	−8	23	
9	FC Rorschach	24	9	3	12	27	40	−13	21	
10	FC Widnau	24	7	6	11	37	44	−7	20	
11	FC Amriswil	24	4	11	9	39	46	−7	19	Play-out against relegation
12	FC Dietikon	24	6	7	11	20	41	−21	19	Play-out against relegation
13	FC Oerlikon/Polizei ZH	24	8	2	14	42	52	−10	18	Relegation to 2. Liga Interregional

Source: RSSSF
Rules for classification: 1) Points; 2) Goal difference within the league, but decider play-off for qualifiers.

=== Decider for twelfth place ===
The decider was played in Frauenfeld.

Team 1	Score	Team 2
FC Amriswil	3–0	FC Dietikon

FC Amriswil win and remain in the division. FC Dietikon were relegated to 2. Liga Interregional.

== Promotion play-off ==
The three group winners played a round-robin against the four teams who had not been in their group. The teams did not play against the team that had been in the same group.

=== Matches ===
The first games were played on 5 June

Team 1	Score	Team 2
FC Wettingen	4–2	Etoile Carouge FC
SC Zug	1–0	FC Olten
Xamax	3–2	FC Langenthal

The second round was played on 12 June

Team 1	Score	Team 2
FC Langenthal	3–0	FC Wettingen
FC Olten	1–2	Xamax
Etoile Carouge FC	3–3	SC Zug

The third round was played on 19 June

Team 1	Score	Team 2
FC Langenthal	1–1	Etoile Carouge FC
FC Olten	2–4	FC Wettingen
Xamax	5–0	SC Zug

The final round was played on 26 June

Team 1	Score	Team 2
FC Wettingen	3–0	Xamax
Etoile Carouge FC	5–1	FC Olten
SC Zug	2–3	FC Langenthal

=== Final table ===
Pos	Team	Pld	W	D	L	GF	GA	GD	Pts	Qualification
1	FC Wettingen	4	3	0	1	11	7	+4	6	1. Liga champions promoted to 1966–67 Nationalliga B
2	Xamax	4	3	0	1	10	6	+4	6	Promoted to 1966–67 Nationalliga B
3	FC Langenthal	4	2	1	1	9	6	+3	5	
4	Etoile Carouge FC	4	1	2	1	11	9	+2	4	
5	SC Zug	4	1	1	2	6	11	−5	3	
6	FC Olten	4	0	0	4	4	12	−8	0	

Source: RSSSF
Rules for classification: 1) Points; 2) Head-to-head points.

== Further in Swiss football ==
- 1965–66 Nationalliga A
- 1965–66 Nationalliga B
- 1965–66 Swiss Cup

== Sources ==
- Switzerland 1965–66 at RSSSF

Preceded by 1964–65	Seasons in Swiss 1. Liga	Succeeded by 1966–67
