= René Brodmann =

Swiss footballer (1933-2000)

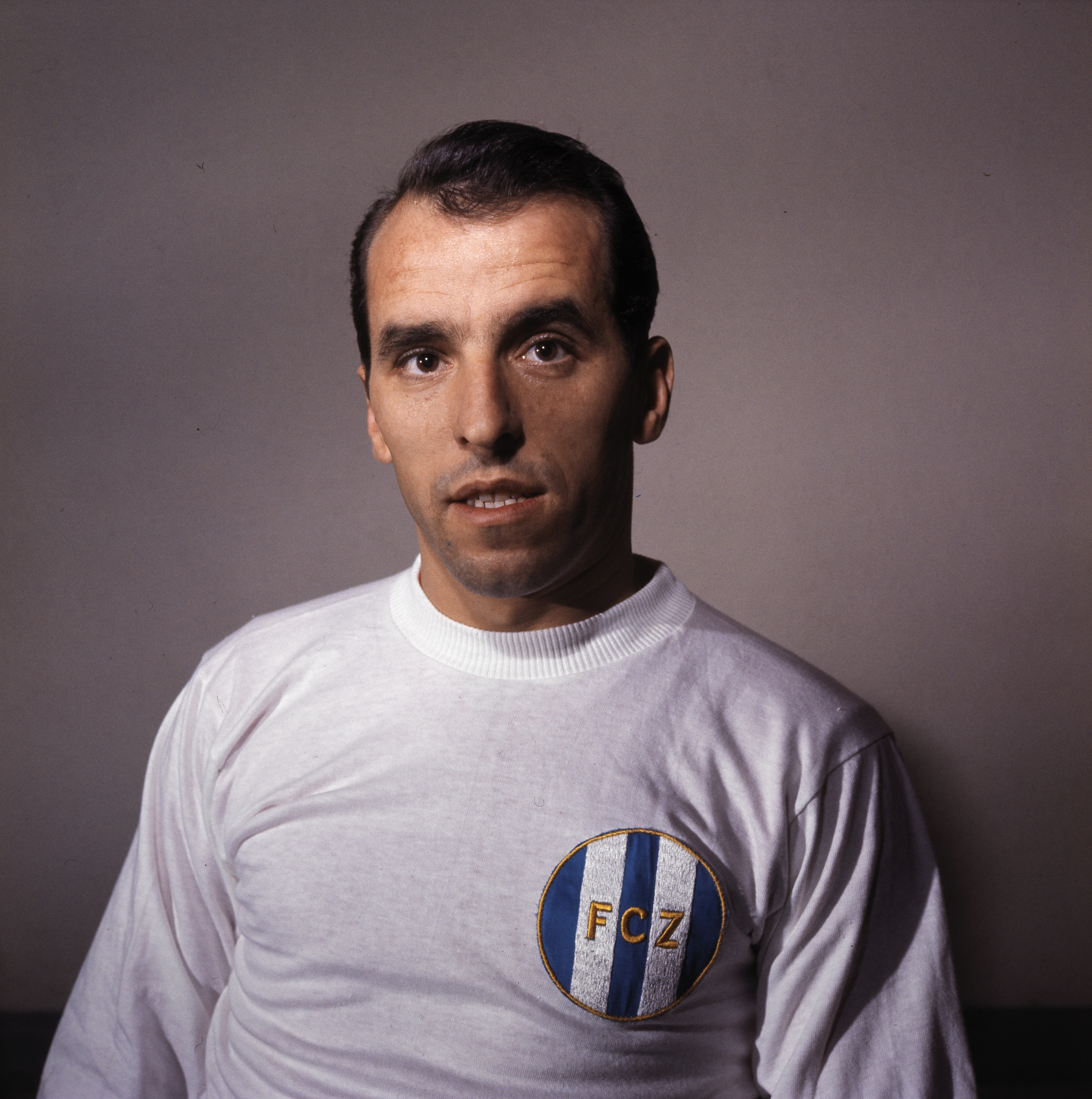
- Brodmann in 1963

Personal information
- Date of birth: 25 October 1933
- Place of birth: Ettingen, Switzerland
- Date of death: August 2000 (aged 66)
- Height: 1.75 m (5 ft 9 in)
- Position: Defender

Senior career*
Years	Team	Apps	(Gls)
1956–1957	Nordstern Basel	3	(0)
1958–1961	Grasshopper Club Zürich	59	(3)
1962–1967	FC Zürich	133	(23)
1967–1968	FC St. Gallen	8	(1)
Total		203	(27)

International career
1962–1966	Switzerland	5	(1)

Managerial career
- 1967: FC Zürich
- 1967–1968: FC St. Gallen
- * Club domestic league appearances and goals

René Brodmann (25 October 1933 – August 2000) was a Swiss football defender who played for Switzerland in the 1966 FIFA World Cup. He also played for Grasshopper Club Zürich, FC Zürich, and FC St. Gallen. He died during a car crash in August 2000, aged 66.
