= 1965–66 Nationalliga A =

Swiss football season

Nationalliga A
- Season: 1965–66
- Champions: Zürich
- Relegated: Luzern; Urania Genève Sport
- Top goalscorer: Rolf Blättler (GC); 28 goals

Nationalliga B
- Season: 1965–66
- Champions: Winterthur
- Promoted: Winterthur; FC Moutier
- Relegated: FC Porrentruy; Cantonal Neuchâtel

The following is the summary of the Swiss National League in the 1965–66 football season, both Nationalliga A and Nationalliga B. This was the 69th season of top-tier and the 68th season of second-tier football in Switzerland.

== Overview ==
The Swiss Football Association (ASF/SFV) had 28 member clubs at this time which were divided into two divisions of 14 teams each. The teams played a double round-robin to decide their table positions. Two points were awarded for a win, and one point was awarded for a draw. The top tier (NLA) was contested by the top 12 teams from the previous 1964–65 season and the two newly promoted teams Urania Genève Sport and Young Fellows. The champions would qualify for the 1966–67 European Cup and the last two teams in the league table at the end of the season were to be relegated.

The second-tier (NLB) was contested by the two teams that had been relegated from the NLA, Bellinzona and Chiasso, the ten teams that had been in third to twelfth position last season and the two newly promoted teams St. Gallen and Blue Stars. The top two teams at the end of the season would be promoted to the 1967–68 NLA and the two last placed teams would be relegated to the 1967–68 Swiss 1. Liga.

The Swiss champions received a slot in the 1966–67 European Cup and the Cup winners a slot in the 1966–67 Cup Winners' Cup. FC Zürich won the championship and also won the Swiss Cup. Thus they won the double for the first time in the club's history. They participated in the European Cup the following season and the slot in the Cup Winner's Cup was passed on to Servette as losing finalist.

== Nationalliga A ==
=== Teams, locations ===
Team	Based in	Canton	Stadium	Capacity
FC Basel	Basel	Basel-Stadt	St. Jakob Stadium	36,800
FC Biel-Bienne	Biel/Bienne	Bern	Stadion Gurzelen	15,000
Grasshopper Club Zürich	Zürich	Zürich	Hardturm	20,000
FC Grenchen	Grenchen	Solothurn	Stadium Brühl	15,100
FC La Chaux-de-Fonds	La Chaux-de-Fonds	Neuchâtel	Centre Sportif de la Charrière	12,700
FC Lausanne-Sport	Lausanne	Vaud	Pontaise	15,700
FC Lugano	Lugano	Ticino	Cornaredo Stadium	6,330
FC Luzern	Lucerne	Lucerne	Stadion Allmend	25,000
Servette FC	Geneva	Geneva	Stade des Charmilles	27,000
FC Sion	Sion	Valais	Stade de Tourbillon	16,000
Urania Genève Sport	Genève	Geneva	Stade de Frontenex	4,000
BSC Young Boys	Bern	Bern	Wankdorf Stadium	56,000
FC Young Fellows Zürich	Zürich	Zürich	Utogrund	2,850
FC Zürich	Zürich	Zürich	Letzigrund	25,000

=== Final league table ===
Pos	Team	Pld	W	D	L	GF	GA	GD	Pts	Qualification or relegation
1	Zürich	26	18	6	2	73	25	+48	42	Swiss Champions, qualified for 1966–67 European Cup and Swiss Cup winners,
2	Servette	26	14	7	5	57	45	+12	35	Swiss Cup finalist, qualified for 1966–67 Cup Winners' Cup
3	Lausanne-Sport	26	12	8	6	72	46	+26	32	Entered 1966–67 Inter-Cities Fairs Cup
4	La Chaux-de-Fonds	26	12	7	7	53	42	+11	31	
5	Young Boys	26	11	7	8	72	47	+25	29	
6	Basel	26	10	7	9	64	57	+7	27	Entered 1966–67 Inter-Cities Fairs Cup
7	Grasshopper Club	26	11	5	10	55	54	+1	27	
8	Sion	26	9	8	9	36	36	0	26	
9	Lugano	26	6	10	10	27	37	−10	22	
10	Biel-Bienne	26	6	10	10	38	56	−18	22	Entered 1966–67 Intertoto Cup
11	Grenchen	26	8	6	12	42	65	−23	22	Entered 1966–67 Intertoto Cup
12	Young Fellows Zürich	26	7	7	12	46	62	−16	21	
13	Luzern	26	4	10	12	36	56	−20	18	Relegated to 1966–67 Nationalliga B
14	Urania Genève Sport	26	3	4	19	35	78	−43	10	Relegated to 1966–67 Nationalliga B

Source: rsssf.com
Rules for classification: 1) Points; 2) Goal difference within the league, however with play-off for qualifiers;

=== Results ===
Home \ Away	BAS	BB	CDF	GCZ	GRE	LS	LUG	LUZ	SER	SIO	UGS	YB	YFZ	ZÜR
Basel		5–0	2–0	1–5	5–1	1–1	3–1	2–0	5–2	2–1	4–1	4–2	5–1	2–5
Biel-Bienne	1–1		1–3	0–0	2–2	2–1	1–1	1–1	1–1	2–2	7–1	1–1	0–3	1–1
La Chaux-de-Fonds	2–1	4–0		4–0	4–2	2–2	1–1	2–1	1–2	1–2	4–2	4–2	1–4	4–2
Grasshopper Club	2–2	1–2	2–1		1–2	3–3	2–0	4–2	4–1	0–1	3–1	1–6	7–2	0–3
Grenchen	3–2	3–2	1–2	0–4		1–6	5–1	0–1	1–1	2–2	2–1	0–2	3–0	0–1
Lausanne-Sport	5–3	5–0	1–3	1–1	4–1		5–0	2–2	2–3	2–0	6–2	2–2	1–1	1–4
Lugano	2–2	2–2	1–1	2–2	1–2	1–0		0–1	0–0	3–0	4–2	1–0	2–0	0–1
Luzern	4–4	2–4	4–1	2–4	2–2	3–5	1–0		2–2	0–0	0–1	1–1	0–0	1–4
Servette	6–1	4–0	1–1	5–2	4–1	0–2	2–1	3–1		2–1	3–1	1–0	3–3	2–2
Sion	1–0	1–4	2–0	5–0	2–2	2–3	0–0	0–0	0–2		5–1	2–1	2–0	1–1
Urania	2–2	0–1	0–0	1–3	1–3	2–6	0–1	3–2	2–3	1–1		2–3	2–1	3–3
Young Boys	1–1	4–2	3–3	1–0	6–2	6–1	2–2	9–2	2–3	4–1	3–1		8–1	1–4
Young Fellows	5–4	2–1	1–1	2–3	7–0	1–5	0–0	1–1	2–0	0–2	4–2	2–2		2–4
Zürich	3–0	5–0	2–3	4–1	1–1	0–0	2–0	1–0	7–1	3–0	4–0	3–0	3–1	

Legend: Blue = home team win; Yellow = draw; Red = away team win.

=== Top scorers ===
Rank	Player	Club	Goals
1	(Switzerland) Rolf Blättler	Grasshopper Club	28
2	(Netherlands) Lambert Theunissen	Young Boys	27
3	(Netherlands) Pierre Kerkhoffs	Lausanne-Sport	21
4	(Switzerland) Robert Hosp	Lausanne-Sport	20
5	(Switzerland) Fritz Künzli	Zürich	18

== Attendances ==
#	Club	Average attendance	Highest attendance
1	Zürich	11,746	20,000
2	Young Boys	9,423	14,500
3	Young Fellows	7,477	18,500
4	Lausanne	6,438	22,000
5	Basel	6,200	10,000
6	Lugano	6,115	10,000
7	Servette	5,822	14,838
8	GCZ	5,538	20,000
9	Luzern	5,208	11,400
10	Biel-Bienne	4,462	10,000
11	Grenchen	4,154	7,500
12	La Chaux-de-Fonds	4,077	11,000
13	Sion	3,923	10,000
14	UGS	2,485	6,100

== Nationalliga B ==
=== Teams, locations ===
Team	Based in	Canton	Stadium	Capacity
FC Aarau	Aarau	Aargau	Stadion Brügglifeld	9,240
FC Baden	Baden	Aargau	Esp Stadium	7,000
AC Bellinzona	Bellinzona	Ticino	Stadio Comunale Bellinzona	5,000
FC Blue Stars Zürich	Zürich	Zürich	Hardhof	1,000
SC Brühl	St. Gallen	St. Gallen	Paul-Grüninger-Stadion	4,200
FC Cantonal Neuchâtel	Neuchâtel	Neuchâtel	Stade de la Maladière	25,500
FC Chiasso	Chiasso	Ticino	Stadio Comunale Riva IV	4,000
FC Le Locle	Le Locle	Neuchâtel	Installation sportive - Jeanneret	3,142
FC Moutier	Moutier	Bern	Stade de Chalière	5,000
FC Porrentruy	Porrentruy	Jura	Stade du Tirage	4,226
FC Solothurn	Solothurn	Solothurn	Stadion FC Solothurn	6,750
FC St. Gallen	St. Gallen	St. Gallen	Espenmoos	11,000
FC Thun	Thun	Bern	Stadion Lachen	10,350
FC Winterthur	Winterthur	Zürich	Schützenwiese	8,550

=== Final league table ===
Pos	Team	Pld	W	D	L	GF	GA	GD	Pts	Qualification or relegation
1	FC Winterthur	26	17	3	6	52	29	+23	37	NLB Champions and promoted to 1966–67 Nationalliga A
2	FC Moutier	26	16	2	8	47	46	+1	34	Promoted to 1966–67 Nationalliga A
3	SC Brühl	26	12	7	7	55	33	+22	31	
4	AC Bellinzona	26	10	8	8	48	33	+15	28	
5	St. Gallen	26	10	7	9	51	46	+5	27	
6	FC Thun	26	11	4	11	45	39	+6	26	
7	FC Chiasso	26	11	3	12	39	42	−3	25	
8	FC Blue Stars Zürich	26	11	3	12	51	58	−7	25	
9	FC Solothurn	26	10	5	11	34	44	−10	25	
10	FC Aarau	26	11	2	13	43	43	0	24	
11	FC Le Locle	26	10	4	12	38	38	0	24	
12	FC Baden	26	7	9	10	35	38	−3	23	
13	FC Porrentruy	26	9	4	13	29	44	−15	22	Relegated to 1966–67 1. Liga
14	FC Cantonal Neuchâtel	26	3	7	16	26	60	−34	13	Relegated to 1966–67 1. Liga

Source: rsssf.com
Rules for classification: 1) Points; 2) Goal difference within the league, however with play-off for qualifiers;

== Further in Swiss football ==
- 1965–66 Swiss Cup
- 1965–66 Swiss 1. Liga

== Sources ==
- Switzerland 1965–66 at RSSSF

Preceded by 1964–65	Nationalliga seasons in Switzerland	Succeeded by 1966–67
