= Steven Ukoh =

Swiss-Nigerian footballer (born 1991)

Personal information
- Date of birth: 19 June 1991 (age 35)
- Place of birth: Switzerland
- Height: 1.77 m (5 ft 9 1/2 in)
- Position: Midfielder

Team information
- Current team: Breitenrain Bern
- Number: 6

Youth career
- FC Bethlehem
- Young Boys

Senior career*
Years	Team	Apps	(Gls)
2008–2010	Young Boys II	30	(10)
2010–2011	Lugano	1	(0)
2011–2016	Biel-Bienne	87	(12)
2017–2018	Solothurn	2	(0)
2018–2019	La Chaux-de-Fonds	10	(0)
2019	Solothurn	3	(1)
2019–2020	08 Villingen	16	(2)
2021–2023	Delémont	66	(6)
2024–2026	Prishtina Bern	55	(5)
2026–	Breitenrain Bern	9	(0)

International career
- Switzerland U16
- Switzerland U17
- Switzerland U18
- Switzerland U19
- Switzerland U20
2015	Nigeria	4	(0)
- * Club domestic league appearances and goals as of 1 October 2026

Steven Ukoh (born 19 June 1991) is a professional footballer who plays for Breitenrain Bern in Swiss Promotion League as a midfielder.

Born in Switzerland, he represents Nigeria at international level.

== Club career ==
Ukoh has played club football for Young Boys II, FC Lugano and FC Biel-Bienne.

== International career ==
After playing youth football for Switzerland, Ukoh switched allegiance to Nigeria in December 2014. He made his senior international debut for Nigeria in January 2015.
