= 1965–66 Intertoto Cup =

European cup

Tournament details
- Teams: 32

Final positions
- Champions: (East Germany) Lokomotive Leipzig (1st title)
- Runners-up: (Sweden) IFK Norrköping

The 1965–66 Intertoto Cup was won by 1. FC Lokomotive Leipzig, who had lost the previous season's final (under their previous name of SC Leipzig). They defeated IFK Norrköping. After experimenting with twelve groups totalling 48 clubs for two years (although latterly only 44 clubs were recruited to fill eleven groups), the competition returned to its original format with 32 clubs divided into eight groups. As a result, the clubs went straight to the quarter-finals after the group stage, while in previous seasons a first round had also been required.

== Group stage ==
The teams were divided into eight groups of four clubs each. Clubs from the Netherlands, Sweden, Switzerland and West Germany were placed in 'A' groups; while clubs from Czechoslovakia, East Germany, Poland and Yugoslavia were placed in 'B' groups. The eight group winners advanced to the knock-out rounds.

=== Group A1 ===
Pos	Team	Pld	W	D	L	GF	GA	GD	Pts	LUG	MAL	ADO	NEU
1	(Switzerland) Lugano	6	3	2	1	9	4	+5	8	—	1–0	3–0	1–2
2	(Sweden) Malmö FF	6	2	2	2	7	7	0	6	1–1	—	2–1	2–0
3	(Netherlands) ADO Den Haag	6	2	1	3	7	9	−2	5	0–2	1–1	—	2–1
4	(West Germany) Borussia Neunkirchen	6	2	1	3	7	10	−3	5	1–1	3–1	0–3	—

Source: mogiel.net
Rules for classification: 1) Points; 2) Goal difference; 3) Goals scored; 4) Head-to-head points; 5) Draw.

=== Group A2 ===
Pos	Team	Pld	W	D	L	GF	GA	GD	Pts	F54	KAI	DJU	GCZ
1	(Netherlands) Fortuna '54	6	5	0	1	10	3	+7	10	—	2–0	3–0	2–1
2	(West Germany) Kaiserslautern	6	2	2	2	8	10	−2	6	2–1	—	0–3	1–1
3	(Sweden) Djurgården	6	2	1	3	9	11	−2	5	0–1	1–1	—	3–2
4	(Switzerland) Grasshopper Club	6	1	1	4	10	13	−3	3	0–1	2–4	4–2	—

Source: mogiel.net
Rules for classification: 1) Points; 2) Goal difference; 3) Goals scored; 4) Head-to-head points; 5) Draw.

=== Group A3 ===
Pos	Team	Pld	W	D	L	GF	GA	GD	Pts	NOR	PSV	EIN	CDF
1	(Sweden) Norrköping	6	4	1	1	16	7	+9	9	—	2–3	1–0	7–1
2	(Netherlands) PSV	6	4	0	2	15	12	+3	8	1–3	—	3–0	2–1
3	(West Germany) Eintracht Frankfurt	6	2	0	4	11	11	0	4	1–2	4–2	—	4–0
4	(Switzerland) La Chaux-de-Fonds	6	1	1	4	8	20	−12	3	1–1	2–4	3–2	—

Source: mogiel.net
Rules for classification: 1) Points; 2) Goal difference; 3) Goals scored; 4) Head-to-head points; 5) Draw.

=== Group A4 ===
Pos	Team	Pld	W	D	L	GF	GA	GD	Pts	ÖRG	SPA	EIN	LUZ
1	(Sweden) Örgryte	6	3	2	1	16	9	+7	8	—	1–1	3–1	8–1
2	(Netherlands) Sparta Rotterdam	6	2	4	0	10	6	+4	8	2–2	—	3–0	0–0
3	(West Germany) Eintracht Braunschweig	6	2	1	3	16	12	+4	5	3–0	1–2	—	7–0
4	(Switzerland) Luzern	6	0	3	3	8	23	−15	3	1–2	2–2	4–4	—

Source: mogiel.net
Rules for classification: 1) Points; 2) Goal difference; 3) Goals scored; 4) Head-to-head points; 5) Draw.
19 June 1965

Sparta Rotterdam (Netherlands)	2-2	(Sweden) Örgryte
Jan Bouman 3'; Theo Laseroms 41'		Rolf Hansson 35'; Claes-Olof Arvidsson 53'

Het Kasteel, Rotterdam
Attendance: 4,076
Referee: (Netherlands) Jef Dorpmans

26 June 1965

Sparta Rotterdam (Netherlands)	3-0	(Germany) Eintracht Braunschweig
Jan Bouman 35', 59'; Tinus Bosselaar 86'

Het Kasteel, Rotterdam
Attendance: 3,910
Referee: (Netherlands) Laurens van Ravens

3 July 1965

Sparta Rotterdam (Netherlands)	0-0	(Switzerland) Luzern

Het Kasteel, Rotterdam
Attendance: 4,164
Referee: (Netherlands) Janus Aalbrecht

10 July 1965

Luzern (Switzerland)	2-2	(Netherlands) Sparta Rotterdam
Heinz Gwerder 22'; Ernst Wechselberger 74'		Theo Laseroms 70'; Henk Prinsen 89'

Stadion Allmend, Lucerne
Attendance: 2,400
Referee: (Switzerland) Karl Göppel

17 July 1965

Eintracht Braunschweig (Germany)	1-2	(Netherlands) Sparta Rotterdam
Lothar Ulsaß 54'		Henk Prinsen 66'; Theo Laseroms 70'

Eintracht-Stadion, Braunschweig
Attendance: 3,500
Referee: (Germany) Johannes Malka

24 July 1965

Örgryte (Sweden)	1-1	(Netherlands) Sparta Rotterdam
Lars Olofsson 67'		Co Onsman 14'

Ullevi, Gothenburg
Attendance: 4,521
Referee: (Sweden) Erik Johansson

=== Group B1 ===
Pos	Team	Pld	W	D	L	GF	GA	GD	Pts
1	(East Germany) SC Motor Jena	6	4	1	1	10	4	+6	9
2	(Czechoslovakia) Tatran Prešov	6	3	2	1	5	2	+3	8
3	(Poland) Szombierki Bytom	6	1	2	3	5	5	0	4
4	(Socialist Federal Republic of Yugoslavia) Rijeka	6	1	1	4	3	12	−9	3

=== Group B2 ===
Pos	Team	Pld	W	D	L	GF	GA	GD	Pts
1	(East Germany) SC Empor Rostock	6	4	0	2	12	4	+8	8
2	(Poland) Zagłębie Sosnowiec	6	3	1	2	13	10	+3	7
3	(Socialist Federal Republic of Yugoslavia) Radnički Niš	6	2	1	3	11	13	−2	5
4	(Czechoslovakia) Košice	6	2	0	4	8	17	−9	4

=== Group B3 ===
- Željezničar became prohibited from international competition by the Yugoslav FA, so SC Leipzig advanced to the knock-out rounds instead

Pos	Team	Pld	W	D	L	GF	GA	GD	Pts
1	(Socialist Federal Republic of Yugoslavia) Željezničar	6	2	3	1	9	7	+2	7
2	(East Germany) SC Leipzig	6	2	2	2	10	11	−1	6
3	(Poland) Gwardia Warsaw	6	3	0	3	10	13	−3	6
4	(Czechoslovakia) Baník Ostrava	6	2	1	3	13	11	+2	5

=== Group B4 ===
Pos	Team	Pld	W	D	L	GF	GA	GD	Pts
1	(East Germany) BSG Chemie Leipzig	6	4	2	0	10	5	+5	10
2	(Czechoslovakia) Internacionál Bratislava	6	3	1	2	14	10	+4	7
3	(Socialist Federal Republic of Yugoslavia) NK Zagreb	6	2	3	1	9	11	−2	7
4	(Poland) Pogoń Szczecin	6	1	0	5	6	13	−7	2

== Quarter-finals ==
Team 1	Agg.	Team 2	1st leg	2nd leg
Örgryte (Sweden)	5–7	(East Germany) SC Leipzig	4–3	1–4
Norrköping (Sweden)	3–2	(East Germany) SC Motor Jena	1–1	2–1
Fortuna '54 (Netherlands)	1–2	(Switzerland) Lugano	1–1	0–1
SC Empor Rostock (East Germany)	5–5^{1}	(East Germany) BSG Chemie Leipzig	2–1	3–4

^{1} Chemie Leipzig progressed to the semi-finals on a coin toss.

== Semi-finals ==
Team 1	Agg.	Team 2	1st leg	2nd leg
SC Leipzig (East Germany)	2–1	(East Germany) BSG Chemie Leipzig	1–1	1–0
Lugano (Switzerland)	1–1^{1}	(Sweden) Norrköping	0–0	1–1

^{1} Norrköping progressed to the Final on a coin toss.

== Final ==
- SC Leipzig were renamed Lokomotive Leipzig before the Final

Team 1	Agg.	Team 2	1st leg	2nd leg
Norrköping (Sweden)	1–4	(East Germany) 1. FC Lokomotive Leipzig	1–0	0–4

== See also ==
- 1965–66 European Cup
- 1965–66 UEFA Cup Winners' Cup
- 1965–66 Inter-Cities Fairs Cup
