= Pierre Kerkhoffs =

Dutch footballer (1936–2021)

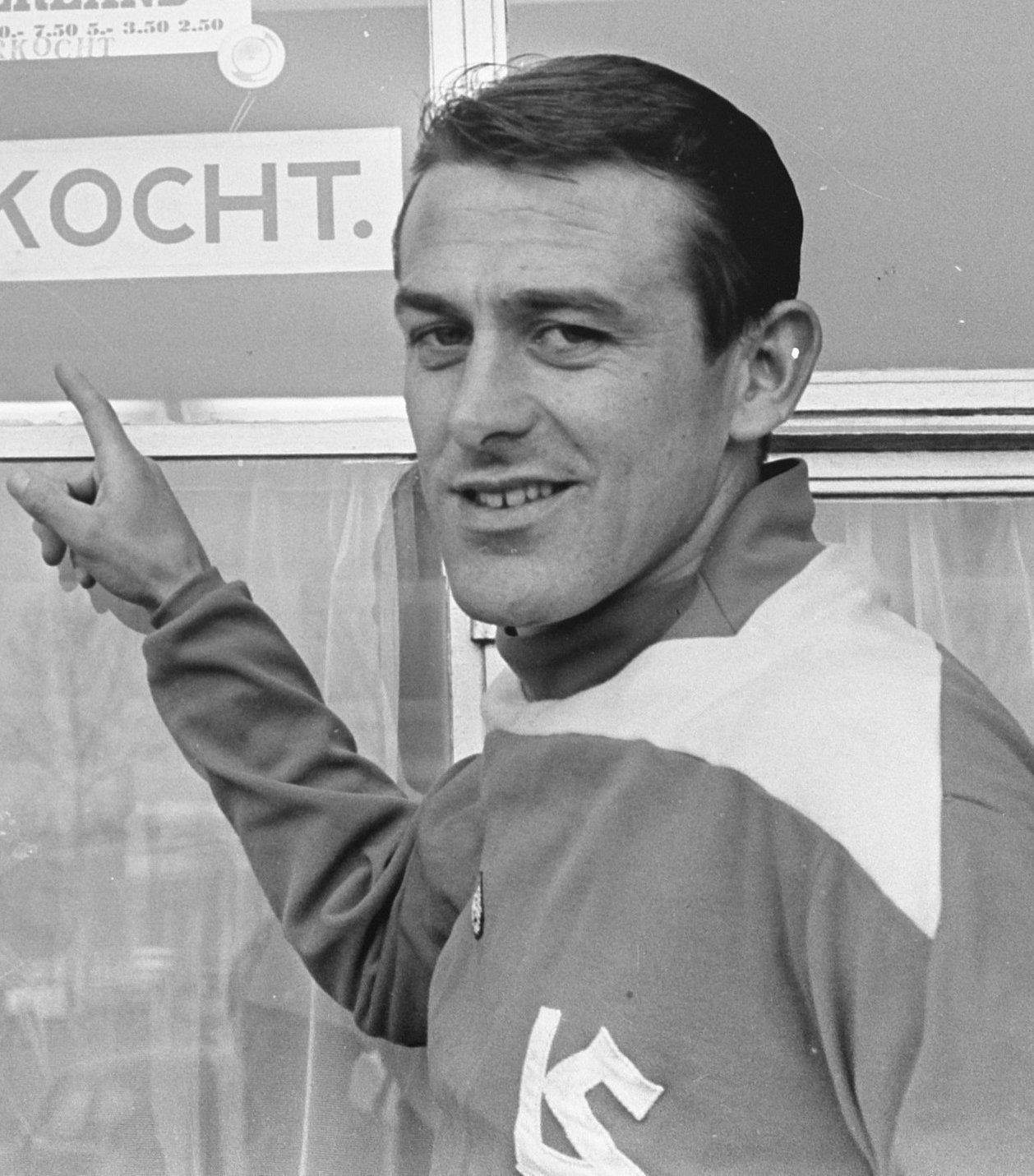
- Kerkhoffs in 1965

Personal information
- Full name: Pieter Johannes Elisabeth Kerkhoffs
- Date of birth: 26 March 1936
- Place of birth: Geleen, Netherlands
- Date of death: 19 October 2021 (aged 85)
- Height: 1.72 m (5 ft 8 in)
- Position: Striker

Senior career*
Years	Team	Apps	(Gls)
1959–1961	SC Enschede	61	(35)
1961–1964	PSV	84	(55)
1964–1971	Lausanne Sport		
1971–1972	Neuchâtel Xamax		
1972–1974	Pully Football		

International career
1960–1965	Netherlands	5	(0)
- * Club domestic league appearances and goals

Pieter Johannes Elisabeth Kerkhoffs (26 March 1936 – 19 October 2021), known as Pierre Kerkhoffs, was a Dutch footballer who played at both professional and international levels as a striker. Kerkhoffs played club football for SC Enschede and PSV, and was the Eredivisie top scorer in the 1962–63 season. He later played in Switzerland for Lausanne Sport.

Kekhoffs also earned five caps for the Netherlands between 1960 and 1965.

== Honours ==
PSV Eindhoven

- Eredivisie: 1962–63

Individual

- Eredivisie top scorer: 1962–63
