= Norbert Eschmann =

Swiss-French footballer and manager (1933-2009)

Personal information
- Date of birth: 19 September 1933
- Place of birth: Besançon, France
- Date of death: 13 May 2009 (aged 75)
- Place of death: Lausanne, Switzerland
- Height: 1.72 m (5 ft 8 in)
- Position: Midfielder

Senior career*
Years	Team	Apps	(Gls)
1951–1954	Lausanne Sports		
1954–1955	Red Star		
1955–1957	Lausanne Sports		
1957–1958	Servette		
1958–1960	Marseille	66	(13)
1960–1963	Stade Français		
1963–1965	Lausanne Sports		
1965–1966	Sion		
1966–1967	Young Boys		
1967–1969	FC Locarno		
1969–1971	Martigny Sports		

International career
	Switzerland	15	(3)

Managerial career
- 1967–1969: FC Locarno
- 1969–1971: Martigny Sports
- * Club domestic league appearances and goals

Norbert Eschmann (19 September 1933 – 13 May 2009) was a footballer who played as a midfielder. Born in France, he represented Switzerland at international level.
