= 1966–67 Swiss 1. Liga =

1. Liga
- Season: 1966–67
- Champions: 1. Liga champions: FC Bern; Group West: FC Fribourg; Group Cenral: FC Cantonal Neuchâtel; Group South and East: FC Frauenfeld
- Promoted: FC Bern; FC Fribourg
- Relegated: Group West: FC Forward Morges; FC Assens; Group Central: FC Olten; SR Delémont; Group South and East: FC Rorschach; FC Wohlen
- Matches: 3 times 156 and 1 decider plus 12 play-offs

The 1966–67 1. Liga season was the 35th season of the 1. Liga since its creation in 1931. At this time, the 1. Liga was the third tier of the Swiss football league system and it was the highest level of amateur football.

== Format ==
There were 39 teams competing in the 1. Liga 1967–68 season. They were divided into three regional groups, each group with 13 teams. Within each group, the teams would play a double round-robin to decide their league position. Two points were awarded for a win. The three group winners and the three runners-up then contested a play-off round to decide the two promotion slots. The last two placed teams in each group were relegated to the 2. Liga (fourth tier).

== Group West ==
=== Teams, locations ===
Club	Based in	Canton	Stadium	Capacity
FC Assens	Assens	Vaud	Terrain FC Assens	1,000
CS Chênois	Thônex	Geneva	Stade des Trois-Chêne	8,000
Étoile Carouge FC	Carouge	Geneva	Stade de la Fontenette	3,690
FC Fontainemelon	Dombresson	Neuchâtel	Centre Sportif Fontainemelon	1,000
FC Fribourg	Fribourg	Fribourg	Stade Universitaire	9,000
FC Martigny-Sports	Martigny	Valais	Stade d'Octodure	2,500
FC Forward Morges	Morges	Vaud	Parc des Sports	600
FC Monthey	Monthey	Valais	Stade Philippe Pottier	1,800
FC Raron	Raron	Valais	Sportplatz Rhoneglut	1,000
FC Stade Lausanne	Ouchy, Lausanne	Vaud	Centre sportif de Vidy	1,000
FC Versoix	Versoix	Geneva	Centre sportif de la Bécassière	1,000
Vevey Sports	Vevey	Vaud	Stade de Copet	4,000
Yverdon-Sport FC	Yverdon-les-Bains	Vaud	Stade Municipal	6,600

=== Final league table ===
Pos	Team	Pld	W	D	L	GF	GA	GD	Pts	Qualification or relegation
1	FC Fribourg	24	18	3	3	58	23	+35	39	Play-off to Nationalliga B
2	Etoile Carouge FC	24	14	6	4	52	22	+30	34	Play-off to Nationalliga B
3	FC Monthey	24	13	5	6	50	30	+20	31	
4	CS Chênois	24	11	5	8	36	29	+7	27	
5	Vevey-Sports	24	10	6	8	40	39	+1	26	
6	FC Martigny-Sports	24	6	12	6	36	40	−4	24	
7	FC Fontainemelon	24	7	8	9	44	44	0	22	
8	Yverdon-Sport FC	24	8	6	10	36	40	−4	22	
9	FC Raron	24	7	7	10	35	37	−2	21	
10	FC Versoix	24	6	8	10	30	42	−12	20	
11	FC Stade Lausanne	24	7	4	13	28	44	−16	18	
12	FC Forward Morges	24	7	2	15	28	49	−21	16	Relegation to 2. Liga Interregional
13	FC Assens	24	3	6	15	29	63	−34	12	Relegation to 2. Liga Interregional

Source: RSSSF
Rules for classification: 1) Points; 2) Goal difference within the league, but decider play-off for qualifiers.

== Group Central ==
=== Teams, locations ===
Club	Based in	Canton	Stadium	Capacity
FC Alle	Alle	Jura	Centre Sportif Régional	2,000
FC Bern	Bern	Bern	Stadion Neufeld	14,000
FC Breitenbach	Breitenbach	Solothurn	Grien	2,000
SC Burgdorf	Burgdorf	Bern	Stadion Neumatt	3,850
FC Cantonal Neuchâtel	Neuchâtel	Neuchâtel	Stade de la Maladière	25,500
FC Concordia Basel	Basel	Basel-Stadt	Stadion Rankhof	7,000
SR Delémont	Delémont	Jura	La Blancherie	5,263
FC Dürrenast	Thun	Bern	Stadion Lachen	13,500
FC Langenthal	Langenthal	Bern	Rankmatte	2,000
FC Minerva Bern	Bern	Bern	Spitalacker	1,450
FC Nordstern Basel	Basel	Basel-Stadt	Rankhof	7,600
FC Olten	Olten	Solothurn	Sportanlagen Kleinholz	8,000
FC Porrentruy	Porrentruy	Jura	Stade du Tirage	4,226

=== Final league table ===
Pos	Team	Pld	W	D	L	GF	GA	GD	Pts	Qualification or relegation
1	FC Cantonal Neuchâtel	24	17	4	3	64	29	+35	38	Play-off to Nationalliga B
2	FC Bern	24	13	8	3	49	23	+26	34	Play-off to Nationalliga B
3	FC Porrentruy	24	14	3	7	47	34	+13	31	
4	FC Langenthal	24	13	4	7	45	29	+16	30	
5	FC Breitenbach	24	9	9	6	29	19	+10	27	
6	FC Minerva Bern	24	8	9	7	41	30	+11	25	
7	FC Concordia Basel	24	9	7	8	38	38	0	25	
8	FC Nordstern Basel	24	7	8	9	31	37	−6	22	
9	SC Burgdorf	24	6	8	10	30	31	−1	20	
10	FC Alle	24	5	9	10	29	45	−16	19	
11	FC Dürrenast	24	7	2	15	38	55	−17	16	Play-out against relegation
12	FC Olten	24	7	2	15	27	49	−22	16	Play-out against relegation
13	SR Delémont	24	3	3	18	26	75	−49	9	Relegation to 2. Liga Interregional

Source: RSSSF
Rules for classification: 1) Points; 2) Goal difference within the league, but decider play-off for qualifiers.

=== Decider for eleventh place ===
The decider was played on 4 June in Burgdorf.

Team 1	Score	Team 2
FC Dürrenast	2–0	FC Olten

FC Dürrenast win and remain in the division. FC Olten are relegated directly to 2. Liga Interregional.

== Group South and East ==
=== Teams, locations ===
Club	Based in	Canton	Stadium	Capacity
FC Amriswil	Amriswil	Thurgau	Tellenfeld	1,000
FC Emmenbrücke	Emmen	Lucerne	Stadion Gersag	8,700
FC Frauenfeld	Frauenfeld	Thurgau	Kleine Allmend	6,370
FC Küsnacht	Küsnacht	Zürich	Sportanlage Heslibach	2,300
FC Locarno	Locarno	Ticino	Stadio comunale Lido	5,000
FC Red Star Zürich	Zürich	Zürich	Allmend Brunau	2,000
FC Rorschach	Rorschach	Schwyz	Sportplatz Kellen	1,000
FC Schaffhausen	Schaffhausen	Schaffhausen	Stadion Breite	7,300
FC Uster	Uster	Zürich	Sportanlage Buchholz	7,000
FC Vaduz	Vaduz	Liechtenstein	Rheinpark Stadion	7,584
FC Widnau	Widnau	St. Gallen	Sportanlage Aegeten	2,000
FC Wohlen	Wohlen	Aargau	Stadion Niedermatten	3,734
SC Zug	Zug	Zug	Herti Allmend Stadion	6,000

=== Final league table ===
Pos	Team	Pld	W	D	L	GF	GA	GD	Pts	Qualification or relegation
1	FC Frauenfeld	24	15	5	4	54	31	+23	35	Play-off to Nationalliga B
2	FC Küsnacht	24	13	5	6	34	22	+12	31	Play-off to Nationalliga B
3	FC Locarno	24	10	10	4	32	17	+15	30	
4	FC Emmenbrücke	24	11	5	8	43	26	+17	27	
5	SC Zug	24	9	7	8	39	33	+6	25	
6	FC Schaffhausen	24	7	9	8	27	29	−2	23	
7	FC Widnau	24	10	3	11	36	40	−4	23	
8	FC Vaduz	24	10	3	11	29	42	−13	23	
9	FC Uster	24	8	6	10	25	28	−3	22	
10	FC Amriswil	24	9	4	11	35	39	−4	22	
11	FC Red Star Zürich	24	9	3	12	42	41	+1	21	
12	FC Rorschach	24	6	7	11	28	38	−10	19	Relegation to 2. Liga Interregional
13	FC Wohlen	24	4	3	17	24	62	−38	11	Relegation to 2. Liga Interregional

Source: RSSSF
Rules for classification: 1) Points; 2) Goal difference within the league, but decider play-off for qualifiers.

== Promotion play-off ==
The three group winners and the runners-up played a round-robin against the four teams who had not been in their group.

=== Matches ===
The first games were played on 4 June.

Team 1	Score	Team 2
FC Bern	4–2	Etoile Carouge FC
FC Küsnacht	0–0	FC Fribourg
FC Cantonal Neuchâtel	3–0	FC Frauenfeld

The second round was played on 11 June.

Team 1	Score	Team 2
Etoile Carouge FC	2–1	FC Küsnacht
FC Fribourg	2–1	FC Cantonal Neuchâtel
FC Frauenfeld	0–2	FC Bern

The next games were played on 18 June.

Team 1	Score	Team 2
FC Bern	2–1	FC Fribourg
FC Cantonal Neuchâtel	6–1	FC Küsnacht
FC Frauenfeld	2–3	Etoile Carouge FC

The final round were played on 25 June 1967.

Team 1	Score	Team 2
Etoile Carouge FC	1–1	FC Cantonal Neuchâtel
FC Fribourg	9–0	FC Frauenfeld
FC Küsnacht	1–1	FC Bern

=== Final table ===
Pos	Team	Pld	W	D	L	GF	GA	GD	Pts	Qualification
1	FC Bern	4	3	1	0	9	4	+5	7	1. Liga champions promoted to 1967–68 Nationalliga B
2	FC Fribourg	4	2	1	1	12	3	+9	5	Promoted to 1967–68 Nationalliga B
3	FC Cantonal Neuchâtel	4	2	1	1	11	4	+7	5	
4	Etoile Carouge FC	4	2	1	1	8	8	0	5	
5	FC Küsnacht	4	0	2	2	3	9	−6	2	
6	FC Frauenfeld	4	0	0	4	2	17	−15	0	

Source: RSSSF
Rules for classification: 1) Points; 2) Head-to-head points.

== Further in Swiss football ==
- 1966–67 Nationalliga A
- 1966–67 Nationalliga B
- 1966–67 Swiss Cup

== Sources ==
- Switzerland 1966–67 at RSSSF

Preceded by 1965–66	Seasons in Swiss 1. Liga	Succeeded by 1967–68
