= Xavier Stierli =

Swiss footballer (born 1940)

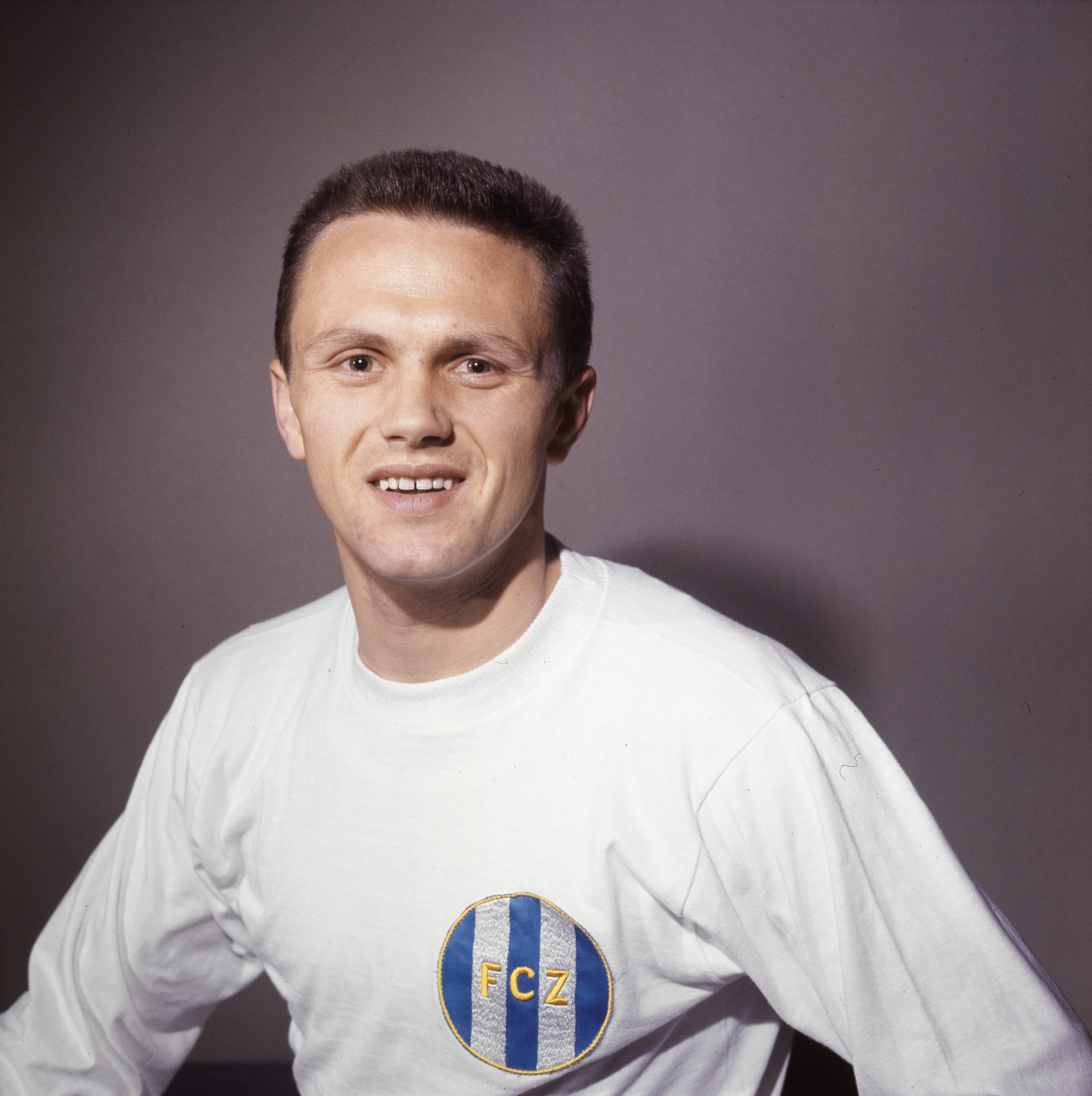
- Xavier Stierli in 1963

Personal information
- Date of birth: 29 October 1940 (age 86)
- Place of birth: Switzerland
- Position: Midfielder

Senior career*
Years	Team	Apps	(Gls)
1960–1970	FC Zürich		

International career
1963–1967	Switzerland	12	(0)
- * Club domestic league appearances and goals

Xavier Stierli (born 29 October 1940) is a Swiss football midfielder who played for Switzerland in the 1966 FIFA World Cup. He also played for FC Zürich.
