= 1966–67 Nationalliga A =

Swiss football season

Nationalliga A
- Season: 1966–67
- Champions: Basel
- Relegated: Winterthur; FC Moutier
- Top goalscorer: Rolf Blättler (Grasshopper Club) and Fritz Künzli (Zürich) both 28 goals

Nationalliga B
- Season: 1966–67
- Champions: Luzern
- Promoted: Luzern; Bellinzona
- Relegated: FC Le Locle; Blue Stars
- Top goalscorer: Heinz Bertschi (Luzern); 22 goals

The following is the summary of the Swiss National League in the 1966–67 football season, both Nationalliga A and Nationalliga B. This was the 71st season of top-tier and the 70th season of second-tier football in Switzerland.

== Overview ==
The Swiss Football Association (ASF/SFV) had 28 member clubs at this time which were divided into two divisions of 14 teams each. The teams played a double round-robin to decide their table positions. Two points were awarded for a win, and one point was awarded for a draw. The top tier (NLA) was contested by the top 12 teams from the previous 1965–66 season and the two newly promoted teams Winterthur and FC Moutier. The champions would qualify for the 1967–68 European Cup and the last two teams in the league table at the end of the season were to be relegated.

The second-tier (NLB) was contested by the two teams that had been relegated from the NLA, FC Luzern and Urania Genève Sport, the ten teams that had been in third to twelfth position last season and the two newly promoted teams FC Wettingen and FC Xamax. The top two teams at the end of the season would be promoted to the 1967–68 NLA and the two last placed teams would be relegated to the 1967–68 Swiss 1. Liga.

The Swiss champions received a slot in the 1967–68 European Cup and the Cup winners a slot in the 1967–68 Cup Winners' Cup. Basel won the championship and also won the Swiss Cup. In the Cup final Basel's opponents were Lausanne-Sports. In the former Wankdorf Stadium on 15 May 1967, Helmut Hauser scored the decisive goal via penalty. The game went down in football history due to the sit-down strike that followed this goal. After 88 minutes of play, with the score at 1–1, referee Karl Göppel awarded Basel a controversial penalty. André Grobéty had pushed Hauser gently in the back and he let himself drop theatrically. Subsequent to the 2–1 for Basel the Lausanne players refused to resume the game and they sat down demonstratively on the pitch. The referee had to abandon the match. Basel were awarded the cup with a 3–0 forfait. Basel won the double for the first time in the club's history. Basel participated in the European Cup in the following season and the slot in the Cup Winner's Cup was past on to Lausanne as losing finalist.

== Nationalliga A ==
The first round of the NLA was played on 20 August 1966. After playing 14 rounds, from 4 December until 3 March 1967 as the 15th round was held, there was a winter break. Four games from the first half of the season had been delayed and these were played at the end of February. The season had 26 rounds and was completed on 11 June 1967.

=== Teams, locations ===
Team	Based in	Canton	Stadium	Capacity
FC Basel	Basel	Basel-Stadt	St. Jakob Stadium	36,800
FC Biel-Bienne	Biel/Bienne	Bern	Stadion Gurzelen	15,000
Grasshopper Club Zürich	Zürich	Zürich	Hardturm	20,000
FC Grenchen	Grenchen	Solothurn	Stadium Brühl	15,100
FC La Chaux-de-Fonds	La Chaux-de-Fonds	Neuchâtel	Centre Sportif de la Charrière	12,700
FC Lausanne-Sport	Lausanne	Vaud	Pontaise	15,700
FC Lugano	Lugano	Ticino	Cornaredo Stadium	6,330
FC Moutier	Moutier	Bern	Stade de Chalière	5,000
Servette FC	Geneva	Geneva	Stade des Charmilles	27,000
FC Sion	Sion	Valais	Stade de Tourbillon	16,000
FC Winterthur	Winterthur	Zürich	Schützenwiese	8,550
BSC Young Boys	Bern	Bern	Wankdorf Stadium	56,000
FC Young Fellows Zürich	Zürich	Zürich	Utogrund	2,850
FC Zürich	Zürich	Zürich	Letzigrund	25,000

=== Final league table ===
Pos	Team	Pld	W	D	L	GF	GA	GD	Pts	Qualification
1	Basel	26	16	8	2	61	20	+41	40	Swiss Champions, qualified for 1967–68 European Cup and Swiss Cup winners
2	Zürich	26	18	3	5	70	31	+39	39	Entered 1967-68 Inter-Cities Fairs Cup
3	Lugano	26	17	5	4	51	29	+22	39	
4	Grasshopper Club	26	14	4	8	60	31	+29	32	
5	Servette	26	10	6	10	49	35	+14	26	Entered 1967-68 Inter-Cities Fairs Cup
6	Sion	26	10	6	10	48	38	+10	26	Entered 1967 Intertoto Cup
7	Young Boys	26	10	6	10	44	48	−4	26	Entered 1967 Intertoto Cup
8	Grenchen	26	10	4	12	43	49	−6	24	Entered 1967 Intertoto Cup
9	Young Fellows Zürich	26	9	6	11	33	44	−11	24	Entered 1967 Intertoto Cup
10	Lausanne-Sport	26	9	3	14	46	44	+2	21	Swiss Cup finalist, qualified for 1967–68 Cup Winners' Cup and entered 1967 Intertoto Cup
11	Biel-Bienne	26	8	5	13	25	42	−17	21	
12	La Chaux-de-Fonds	26	8	4	14	34	48	−14	20	To relegation play-out
13	Winterthur	26	8	4	14	33	54	−21	20	To relegation play-out
14	FC Moutier	26	2	2	22	16	100	−84	6	Relegated to 1967–68 Nationalliga B

Source: rsssf.com
Rules for classification: 1) Points; 2) Goal difference within the league, however with play-off for qualifiers;

=== Results ===
Home \ Away	BAS	BB	CDF	GCZ	GRE	LS	LUG	MOU	SER	SIO	WIN	YB	YFZ	ZÜR
Basel		4–1	1–0	2–2	5–0	2–2	1–0	10–0	1–1	2–1	4–0	4–1	2–2	3–1
Biel-Bienne	0–2		1–1	0–3	2–1	0–2	1–1	1–1	0–1	3–0	0–3	3–1	1–1	0–4
La Chaux-de-Fonds	0–2	0–1		3–1	0–2	1–3	1–2	3–1	3–1	0–0	0–2	4–0	1–1	0–2
Grasshopper Club	0–2	1–0	5–2		0–1	0–0	1–1	2–1	1–0	0–1	6–0	4–0	0–1	2–1
Grenchen	0–4	0–0	1–4	3–5		3–0	1–1	6–1	1–4	2–1	8–2	2–4	1–0	0–3
Lausanne-Sports	0–2	1–2	5–1	1–5	1–2		5–3	0–1	0–2	3–2	4–0	1–1	4–0	1–2
Lugano	3–1	1–0	2–1	3–0	0–0	3–2		4–1	1–0	3–0	1–0	3–0	2–1	1–4
Moutier	0–1	1–0	0–2	2–10	0–4	1–3	0–1		0–8	1–3	1–5	0–1	2–3	0–3
Servette	1–2	2–3	5–0	2–2	2–1	2–1	2–4	0–0		4–3	1–2	1–2	3–1	3–0
Sion	0–0	0–1	1–1	3–0	4–1	3–0	2–2	7–0	0–0		3–0	1–3	5–0	2–3
Winterthur	0–0	0–2	1–2	0–3	2–2	2–1	0–2	4–1	2–1	0–2		2–2	1–1	2–3
Young Boys	1–1	3–1	3–0	0–3	0–1	3–2	3–2	6–1	2–2	2–3	2–0		0–0	3–3
Young Fellows	2–1	3–2	2–3	1–0	2–0	0–4	1–2	5–0	2–0	1–1	0–2	2–0		0–5
Zürich	2–2	5–0	3–1	1–4	2–0	1–0	1–3	8–0	1–1	6–0	2–1	2–1	2–1	

Source: rsssf.com
Legend: Blue = home team win; Yellow = draw; Red = away team win.

=== Relegation play-out ===
Because two teams ended the season level on points in joint twelfth position a decider against relegation was required. This was played on 14 June 1967 at Wankdorf Stadium in Bern.

Team 1	Score	Team 2
La Chaux-de-Fonds	3–1	Winterthur

La Chaux-de-Fonds won and remained in the top tier. Winterthur were relegated to 1967–68 Nationalliga B.

== Nationalliga B ==
=== Teams, locations ===
Team	Based in	Canton	Stadium	Capacity
FC Aarau	Aarau	Aargau	Stadion Brügglifeld	9,240
FC Baden	Baden	Aargau	Esp Stadium	7,000
AC Bellinzona	Bellinzona	Ticino	Stadio Comunale Bellinzona	5,000
FC Blue Stars Zürich	Zürich	Zürich	Hardhof	1,000
SC Brühl	St. Gallen	St. Gallen	Paul-Grüninger-Stadion	4,200
FC Chiasso	Chiasso	Ticino	Stadio Comunale Riva IV	4,000
FC Le Locle	Le Locle	Neuchâtel	Installation sportive - Jeanneret	3,142
FC Luzern	Lucerne	Lucerne	Stadion Allmend	25,000
FC Solothurn	Solothurn	Solothurn	Stadion FC Solothurn	6,750
FC St. Gallen	St. Gallen	St. Gallen	Espenmoos	11,000
FC Thun	Thun	Bern	Stadion Lachen	10,350
Urania Genève Sport	Genève	Geneva	Stade de Frontenex	4,000
FC Wettingen	Wettingen	Aargau	Stadion Altenburg	10,000
FC Xamax	Neuchâtel	Neuchâtel	Stade de la Maladière	25,500

=== Final league table ===
Pos	Team	Pld	W	D	L	GF	GA	GD	Pts	Qualification or relegation
1	FC Luzern	26	17	7	2	68	25	+43	41	NLB Champions and promoted to 1967–68 Nationalliga A
2	AC Bellinzona	26	16	6	4	47	43	+4	38	Promoted to 1967–68 Nationalliga A
3	FC Wettingen	26	14	4	8	53	36	+17	32	
4	FC Aarau	26	10	12	4	39	29	+10	32	
5	FC St. Gallen	26	10	7	9	51	46	+5	27	
6	FC Xamax	26	11	5	10	42	40	+2	27	
7	FC Thun	26	9	8	9	38	43	−5	26	
8	Urania Genève Sport	26	10	4	12	33	47	−14	24	
9	FC Chiasso	26	7	8	11	31	34	−3	22	
10	FC Baden	26	7	8	11	35	34	+1	22	
11	FC Solothurn	26	8	5	13	27	36	−9	21	
12	SC Brühl	26	5	9	12	32	52	−20	19	
13	FC Le Locle	26	6	5	15	42	54	−12	17	Relegated to 1967–68 1. Liga
14	FC Blue Stars Zürich	26	5	6	15	28	47	−19	16	Relegated to 1967–68 1. Liga

Source: rsssf.com
Rules for classification: 1) Points; 2) Goal difference within the league, however with play-off for qualifiers;

== Further in Swiss football ==
- 1966–67 Swiss Cup
- 1966–67 Swiss 1. Liga

== Sources ==
- Switzerland 1966–67 at RSSSF

Preceded by 1965–66	Nationalliga seasons in Switzerland	Succeeded by 1967–68
