= FC Breitenrain Bern =

Swiss football club

- Full name: Football Club Breitenrain Bern
- Founded: 1994; 32 years ago
- Ground: Spitalacker, Bern
- Capacity: 1,500
- Chairman: Claudio Engeloch
- Coach: Edvaldo Della Casa
- League: Promotion League
- 2024–25: 5th of 18
Home colours	Away colours

Football Club Breitenrain Bern is a football team from Bern, Switzerland. The team currently plays in the Promotion League, the third tier of Swiss football.

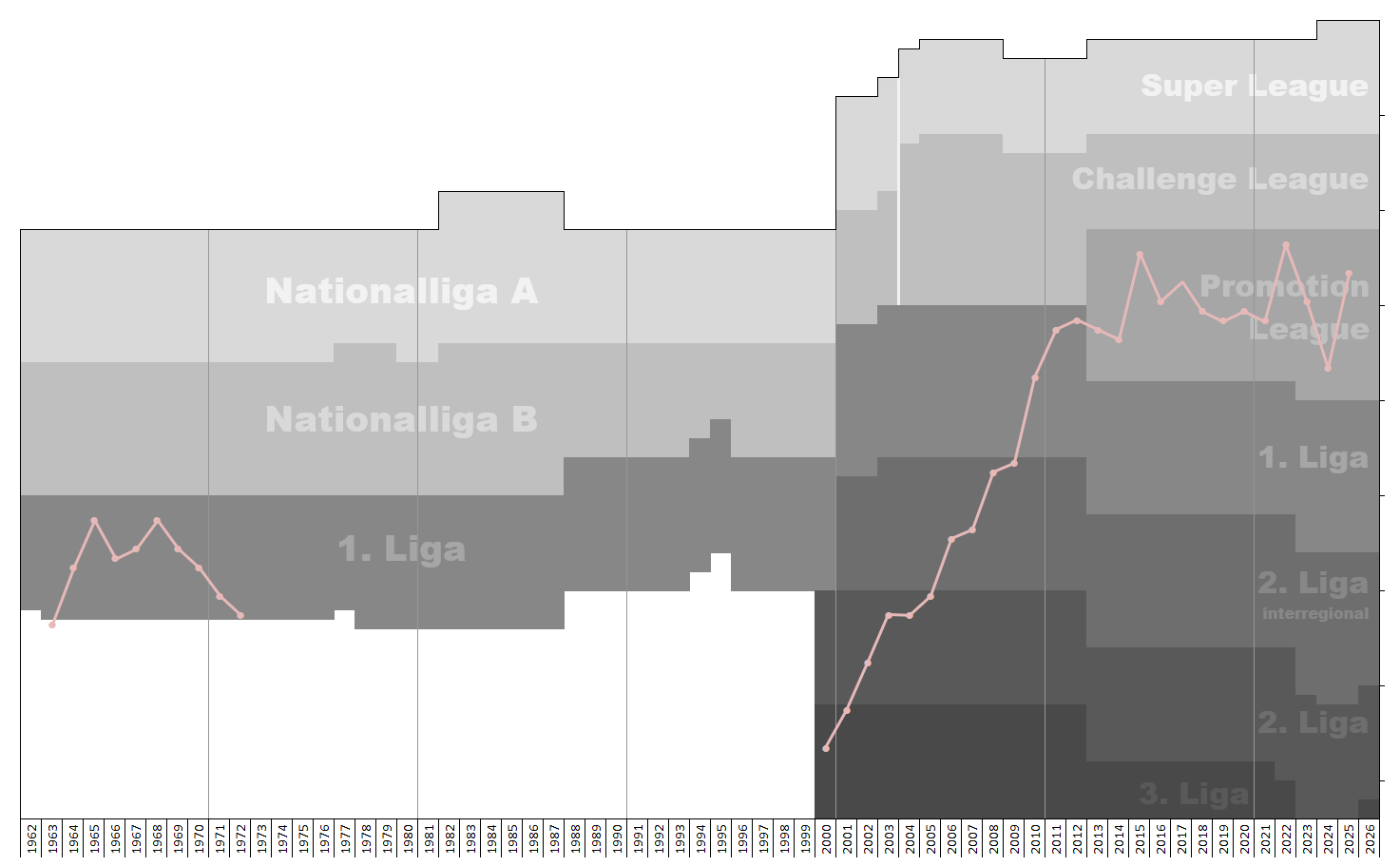
Chart of FC Breitenrain table positions in the Swiss football league system

== History ==
The club was founded in 1994 as a merger of the clubs FC Minerva Bern and FC Zaehringia Bern.

In 2011–12, FC Breitenrain Bern secured promotion to new third tier as Promotion League for the first time in history after obtaining an eligible club license.

== Current squad ==
As of 20 September 2026. Note: Flags indicate national team as defined under FIFA eligibility rules; some limited exceptions apply. Players may hold more than one non-FIFA nationality.

No.	Pos.	Nation	Player
1	GK	SUI	Romeo Kilchhofer
2	DF	SUI	Ciril Pahud
3	DF	SUI	Mohammad Bahmad
4	DF	SUI	Noa Mariano
5	DF	SUI	Markus Wenger
6	MF	NGR	Steven Ukoh
7	FW	KOS	Kevin Krasniqi
8	MF	SUI	Tim Frey
9	FW	KOS	Mark Marleku
10	MF	BRA	Neto
12	MF	SUI	Ben Lüthi
13	MF	SUI	Eric Briner
14	MF	SUI	Aggée Wenzi
16	MF	SUI	Luis Aellig

No.	Pos.	Nation	Player
17	DF	SUI	Loris Lüthi
18	DF	SUI	Evan Stadelmann
19	MF	SUI	Christoph Schneuwly
20	DF	SUI	Marco Hurter (captain)
21	GK	SUI	Neel Kissling
22	DF	ALB	Yll Avdyli
23	FW	SUI	Matti Forrer
24	DF	SUI	Tim Bühlmann
25	DF	SUI	Pascal Schüpbach
27	GK	SUI	Yanni Rufener
28	MF	SUI	Luca Santor
29	FW	SUI	Timo Sollberger
30	GK	SUI	Damien Buchard

== Staff and board members ==
- Manager: Edvaldo Della Casa
- Assistant Manager: Felipe Giacomini Lopes
- Goalkeeper Coach: Erich Pfäffli
- President: Stephan Siegenthaler
