= 1964–65 European Cup =

European football tournament

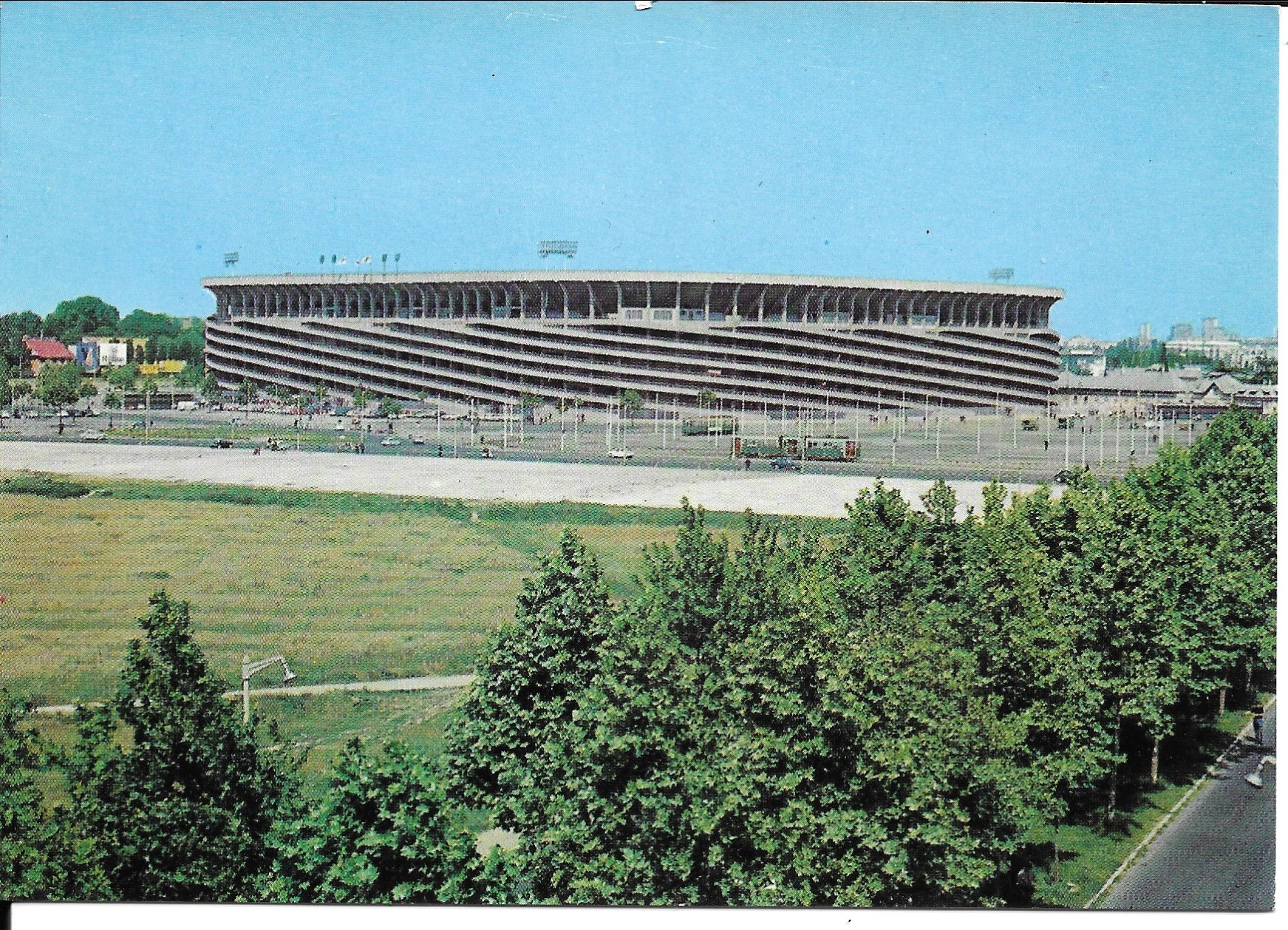
- The San Siro in Milan hosted the final.

Tournament details
- Dates: 17 August 1964 – 27 May 1965
- Teams: 31 (from 30 associations)

Final positions
- Champions: (Italy) Inter Milan (2nd title)
- Runners-up: (Portugal) Benfica

Tournament statistics
- Matches played: 63
- Goals scored: 215 (3.41 per match)
- Attendance: 2,219,373 (35,228 per match)
- Top scorer(s): José Torres (Benfica); 11 goals

The 1964–65 European Cup was the tenth season of the European Cup, UEFA's premier club football tournament. The competition was won by Inter Milan for the second time in row, beating 1–0 two-time former champions Benfica in a final at San Siro, Milan, on 27 May 1965. It meant that Italian teams had won three consecutive titles (AC Milan had won it in 1962–63).

During this edition a coin toss was used a record three times to decide winners of the ties after play-off matches ended as draws.

Iceland entered its champion for the first time this season, while Cyprus did not enter this time around.

== Teams ==
A total of 31 teams participated in the competition.

Italy continued to be represented by two clubs, with Inter Milan qualifying as title holders and Bologna as Italian champions. Alongside ever-present Real Madrid were Benfica, Rangers and Dukla Prague appearing in their sixth edition.

Lokomotiv Sofia, Chemie Leipzig, Liverpool, Reipas Lahti, Győri Vasas ETO, KR, Bologna, Aris Bonnevoie, Sliema Wanderers, DWS, Glentoran, Malmö FF and La Chaux-de-Fonds made their debut in the competition.

Saint-Étienne returned to the tournament for the first time since 1957–58 edition, while Boldklubben 1909, Shamrock Rovers, Rapid Wien and Red Star Belgrade returned to the competition after five, five, four and four years, respectively.

All participants were their respective associations champions, except for Inter Milan and Malmö FF. The latter was leading Allsvenskan at the summer break on 1 July 1964, after 11 of 22 matches had been played, but finished second in autumn of 1964.

(Albania) Partizani (1st)	(Austria) Rapid Wien (1st)	(Belgium) Anderlecht (1st)	(Bulgaria) Lokomotiv Sofia (1st)
(Czechoslovakia) Dukla Prague (1st)	(Denmark) Boldklubben 1909 (1st)	(East Germany) Chemie Leipzig (1st)	(England) Liverpool (1st)
(Finland) Reipas Lahti (1st)	(France) Saint-Étienne (1st)	(Greece) Panathinaikos (1st)	(Hungary) Győri Vasas ETO (1st)
(Iceland) KR (1st)	(Italy) Bologna (1st)	(Italy) Inter Milan (2nd)^{TH}	(Luxembourg) Aris Bonnevoie (1st)
(Malta) Sliema Wanderers (1st)	(Netherlands) DWS (1st)	(Northern Ireland) Glentoran (1st)	(Norway) Lyn (1st)
(Poland) Górnik Zabrze (1st)	(Portugal) Benfica (1st)	(Republic of Ireland) Shamrock Rovers (1st)	(Romania) Dinamo București (1st)
(Scotland) Rangers (1st)	(Spain) Real Madrid (1st)	(Sweden) Malmö FF (2nd)	(Switzerland) La Chaux-de-Fonds (1st)
(Turkey) Fenerbahçe (1st)	(West Germany) 1. FC Köln (1st)	(Socialist Federal Republic of Yugoslavia) Red Star Belgrade (1st)	

== Preliminary round ==
Location of teams in the 1964–65 European Cup

Similar to previous edition, due to the number of participating teams, only title holders Inter Milan received a bye to the first round. The remaining clubs would play the preliminary round in September and October, apart from one match taking place in August and one play-off in November.

For the first time in the history of European Cup teams in the preliminary round were not divided geographically into pots, which resulted in some teams covering over 4,400 kilometres for their ties (e.g. DWS and Fenerbahçe), while other had shorter trips (e.g. Dukla Prague and Górnik Zabrze – around 600 kilometres).

Team 1	Agg.	Team 2	1st leg	2nd leg	Play-off
Sliema Wanderers (Malta)	0–7	(Romania) Dinamo București	0–2	0–5	
Rangers (Scotland)	5–5	(Socialist Federal Republic of Yugoslavia) Red Star Belgrade	3–1	2–4	3–1
Rapid Wien (Austria)	5–0	(Republic of Ireland) Shamrock Rovers	3–0	2–0	
Glentoran (Northern Ireland)	4–5	(Greece) Panathinaikos	2–2	2–3	
Partizani (Albania)	0–2	(West Germany) 1. FC Köln	0–0	0–2	
Anderlecht (Belgium)	2–2 (ct)	(Italy) Bologna	1–0	1–2	0–0 (Note: Anderlecht advanced to the first round over Bologna by winning a coin toss, after their play-off match ended 0–0.)
KR (Iceland)	1–11	(England) Liverpool	0–5	1–6	
Chemie Leipzig (East Germany)	2–6	(Hungary) Győri Vasas ETO	0–2	2–4	
Lokomotiv Sofia (Bulgaria)	8–5	(Sweden) Malmö FF	8–3	0–2	
DWS (Netherlands)	4–1	(Turkey) Fenerbahçe	3–1	1–0	
Reipas Lahti (Finland)	2–4	(Norway) Lyn	2–1	0–3	
Boldklubben 1909 (Denmark)	2–9	(Spain) Real Madrid	2–5	0–4	
Dukla Prague (Czechoslovakia)	4–4 (ct)	(Poland) Górnik Zabrze	4–1	0–3	0–0 (Note: Dukla Prague advanced to the first round over Górnik Zabrze by winning a coin toss, after their play-off match ended 0–0.)
Saint-Étienne (France)	3–4	(Switzerland) La Chaux-de-Fonds	2–2	1–2	
Aris (Luxembourg)	2–10	(Portugal) Benfica	1–5	1–5	

=== First leg ===
17 August 1964

KR (Iceland)	0–5	(England) Liverpool
	Report	Wallace 3', 60'; Hunt 46', 88'; Chisnall 89'

Laugardalsvöllur, Reykjavík
Attendance: 10,268
Referee: Johan Riseth (Norway)

2 September 1964
21:30 CET

Rangers (Scotland)	3–1	(Socialist Federal Republic of Yugoslavia) Red Star Belgrade
Brand 10', 89'; Forrest 47'	Report	Kostić 54'

Ibrox Park, Glasgow
Attendance: 77,669
Referee: Franz Geluck (Belgium)

2 September 1964

Chemie Leipzig (East Germany)	0–2	(Hungary) Győri Vasas ETO
	Report	Keglovich 64'; Korsós 66'

Zentralstadion, Leipzig
Attendance: 36,467
Referee: Edward Budaj (Poland)

6 September 1964
15:30 CET

Dukla Prague (Czechoslovakia)	4–1	(Poland) Górnik Zabrze
Vacenovský 22'; Nedorost 55', 87'; Masopust 85'	Report	Lubański 6'

Stadion Juliska, Prague
Attendance: 8,056
Referee: Fritz Köpke (East Germany)

9 September 1964
18:00 CET

Saint-Étienne (France)	2–2	(Switzerland) La Chaux-de-Fonds
Mekhloufi 18'; Guy 60'	Report	Bertschi 32', 43'

Stade Geoffroy-Guichard, Saint-Étienne
Attendance: 17,412
Referee: Aníbal Oliveira (Portugal)

9 September 1964
20:30 CET

Anderlecht (Belgium)	1–0	(Italy) Bologna
Van Himst 49'	Report

Heysel Stadium, Brussels
Attendance: 64,091
Referee: Rudolf Kreitlein (West Germany)

9 September 1964

Reipas Lahti (Finland)	2–1	(Norway) Lyn
Nuoranen 25'; Talsi 66'	Report	Stavrum 26'

Lahden kisapuisto, Lahti
Attendance: 2,336
Referee: Hans Carlsson (Sweden)

9 September 1964

Partizani (Albania)	0–0	(West Germany) 1. FC Köln
	Report

Stadiumi Qemal Stafa, Tirana
Attendance: 26,483
Referee: Stjepan Varaždinec (Yugoslavia)

10 September 1964

Lokomotiv Sofia (Bulgaria)	8–3	(Sweden) Malmö FF
Kotkov 6', 8', 28', 47', 59'; Debarski 20', 42'; Milev 61'	Report	Ekström 15'; Larsson 51', 62'

Vasil Levski National Stadium, Sofia
Attendance: 15,238
Referee: Alfred Haberfellner (Austria)

13 September 1964

Sliema Wanderers (Malta)	0–2	(Romania) Dinamo București
	Report	Frățilă 4'; Nunweiller 41'

Empire Stadium, Gżira
Attendance: 7,784
Referee: Antonio Sbardella (Italy)

16 September 1964
20:30 CET

Rapid Wien (Austria)	3–0	(Republic of Ireland) Shamrock Rovers
Glechner 28', 62'; Nuske 56'	Report

Praterstadion, Vienna
Attendance: 42,323
Referee: Stanislav Fencl (Czechoslovakia)

16 September 1964

Glentoran (Northern Ireland)	2–2	(Greece) Panathinaikos
Turner 44' (pen.); Thompson 58'	Report	Giannakopoulos 13'; Papoutsakis 21'

The Oval, Belfast
Attendance: 16,560
Referee: Frede Hansen (Denmark)

16 September 1964

DWS (Netherlands)	3–1	(Turkey) Fenerbahçe
Geurtsen 45', 63'; Hollander 51'	Report	Pekel 58'

Olympisch Stadion, Amsterdam
Attendance: 36,837
Referee: Tage Sørensen (Denmark)

16 September 1964

Aris (Luxembourg)	1–5	(Portugal) Benfica
Hoffmann 87'	Report	Torres 15', 18', 35', 60'; Eusébio 42'

Stade Municipal, Luxembourg City
Attendance: 4,962
Referee: Karl Keller (Switzerland)

23 September 1964
21:00 CET

Boldklubben 1909 (Denmark)	2–5	(Spain) Real Madrid
Richter 15'; Danielsen 83'	Report	Gento 4', 42', 51'; Grosso 29'; Puskás 60'

Odense Stadion, Odense
Attendance: 18,139
Referee: Kenneth Dagnall (England)

=== Second leg ===
9 September 1964

Red Star Belgrade (Socialist Federal Republic of Yugoslavia)	4–2	(Scotland) Rangers
Prljinčević 33', 68'; Kostić 65'; Melić 78'	Report	Greig 40'; McKinnon 83'

Stadion Crvene zvezde, Belgrade
Attendance: 42,939
Referee: Bruno de Marchi (Italy)

Rangers 5–5 Red Star Belgrade on aggregate; play-off needed.

9 September 1964

Győri Vasas ETO (Hungary)	4–2	(East Germany) Chemie Leipzig
Palotai 10'; Keglovich 30', 50'; Orosz 60'	Report	Scherbarth 85'; Behla 88'

Mártírok útja Stadion, Győr
Attendance: 8,175
Referee: Nicolae Mihăilescu (Romania)

Győri Vasas ETO won 6–2 on aggregate.

14 September 1964
21:30 CET

Liverpool (England)	6–1	(Iceland) KR
Byrne 14'; St John 24', 75'; Hunt 51'; Graham 65'; Stevenson 66'	Report	Felixson 36'

Anfield, Liverpool
Attendance: 32,597
Referee: Andries van Leeuwen (Netherlands)

Liverpool won 11–1 on aggregate.

16 September 1964
21:30 CET

La Chaux-de-Fonds (Switzerland)	2–1	(France) Saint-Étienne
Skiba 46'; Trivellin 70'	Report	Guy 10'

Stade de la Charrière, La Chaux-de-Fonds
Attendance: 9,242
Referee: Manuel Gómez Arribas (Spain)

La Chaux-de-Fonds won 4–3 on aggregate.

19 September 1964

Dinamo București (Romania)	5–0	(Malta) Sliema Wanderers
Pârcălab 30', 42'; Petru 65'; Frățilă 84', 86'	Report

Stadionul August 23, Bucharest
Attendance: 10,501
Referee: Dimitar Rumentchev (Bulgaria)

Dinamo București won 7–0 on aggregate.

20 September 1964
17:00 CET

Górnik Zabrze (Poland)	3–0	(Czechoslovakia) Dukla Prague
Pohl 32', 60'; Musiałek 65'	Report

Stadion Śląski, Chorzów
Attendance: 77,379
Referee: Gyula Emsberger (Hungary)

Dukla Prague 4–4 Górnik Zabrze on aggregate; play-off needed.

23 September 1964

1. FC Köln (West Germany)	2–0	(Albania) Partizani
Sturm 80'; Overath 90'	Report

Müngersdorfer Stadion, Cologne
Attendance: 45,236
Referee: Dittmar Huber (Switzerland)

1. FC Köln won 2–0 on aggregate.

30 September 1964
21:00 CET

Shamrock Rovers (Republic of Ireland)	0–2	(Austria) Rapid Wien
	Report	Wolny 53'; Flögel 85'

Dalymount Park, Dublin
Attendance: 31,649
Referee: Leo Horn (Netherlands)

Rapid Wien won 5–0 on aggregate.

30 September 1964

Malmö FF (Sweden)	2–0	(Bulgaria) Lokomotiv Sofia
Larsson 23' (pen.), 31'	Report

Malmö Stadion, Malmö
Attendance: 11,753
Referee: Gerhard Schulenburger (West Germany)

Lokomotiv Sofia won 8–5 on aggregate.

30 September 1964

Panathinaikos (Greece)	3–2	(Northern Ireland) Glentoran
Loukanidis 18' (pen.), 70'; Papoutsakis 77'	Report	Turner 40'; Pavis 75'

Leoforos Alexandras Stadium, Athens
Attendance: 23,910
Referee: Petar Djonev (Bulgaria)

Panathinaikos won 5–4 on aggregate.

30 September 1964

Benfica (Portugal)	5–1	(Luxembourg) Aris
Eusébio 23', 52'; Simões 57'; Torres 69'; Augusto 87'	Report	Schreiner 48'

Estádio da Luz, Lisbon
Attendance: 16,289
Referee: Jean Tricot (France)

Benfica won 10–2 on aggregate.

7 October 1964

Bologna (Italy)	2–1	(Belgium) Anderlecht
Pascutti 57'; Nielsen 75'	Report	Stockman 89'

Stadio Comunale, Bologna
Attendance: 33,791
Referee: Lajos Horváth (Hungary)

Anderlecht 2–2 Bologna on aggregate; play-off needed.

7 October 1964

Fenerbahçe (Turkey)	0–1	(Netherlands) DWS
	Report	Temming 82'

Mithatpaşa Stadyumu, Istanbul
Attendance: 36,211
Referee: Konstantin Zečević (Yugoslavia)

DWS won 4–1 on aggregate.

7 October 1964

Lyn (Norway)	3–0	(Finland) Reipas Lahti
Seemann 11', 51'; Berg 75'	Report

Bislett Stadion, Oslo
Attendance: 11,394
Referee: William Syme (Scotland)

Lyn won 4–2 on aggregate.

14 October 1964
20:30 CET

Real Madrid (Spain)	4–0	(Denmark) Boldklubben 1909
Gento 9', 88'; Grosso 28'; Amancio 77'	Report

Santiago Bernabéu, Madrid
Attendance: 18,136
Referee: Marcel Bois (France)

Real Madrid won 9–2 on aggregate.

=== Play-off ===
14 October 1964
19:30 CET

Anderlecht (Belgium)	0–0 Decided by a coin flip.	(Italy) Bologna
	Report

Camp Nou, Barcelona
Attendance: 8,649
Referee: Daniel Zariquiegui Izco (Spain)

Anderlecht 0–0 Bologna in play-off match. Anderlecht qualified on a coin toss.

14 October 1964

Dukla Prague (Czechoslovakia)	0–0 Decided by a coin flip.	(Poland) Górnik Zabrze
	Report

Wedaustadion, Duisburg
Attendance: 13,715
Referee: Gerhard Schulenburg (West Germany)

Dukla Prague 0–0 Górnik Zabrze in play-off match. Dukla Prague qualified on a coin toss.

4 November 1964

Rangers (Scotland)	3–1	(Socialist Federal Republic of Yugoslavia) Red Star Belgrade
Forrest 12', 36'; Brand 73'	Report	Čop 73'

Highbury, London
Attendance: 34,428
Referee: Kenneth Dagnall (England)

Rangers won play-off 3–1.

== Bracket ==
First round
(Greece) Panathinaikos	1	1	2
(West Germany) 1. FC Köln	1	2	3
(England) Liverpool	3	1	4
(Belgium) Anderlecht	0	0	0
(Italy) Inter Milan	6	1	7
(Romania) Dinamo București	0	0	0
(Scotland) Rangers	1	2	3
(Austria) Rapid Wien	0	0	0
(Netherlands) DWS	5	3	8
(Norway) Lyn	1	0	1
(Hungary) Győri Vasas ETO	5	3	8
(Bulgaria) Lokomotiv Sofia	3	4	7
(Switzerland) La Chaux-de-Fonds	1	0	1
(Portugal) Benfica	1	5	6
(Spain) Real Madrid	4	2	6
(Czechoslovakia) Dukla Prague	0	2	2

Quarter-finals
(West Germany) 1. FC Köln	0	0	0 (2)
(England) Liverpool (ct)	0	0	0 (2)
(Italy) Inter Milan	3	0	3
(Scotland) Rangers	1	1	2
(Netherlands) DWS	1	0	1
(Hungary) Győri Vasas ETO	1	1	2
(Portugal) Benfica	5	1	6
(Spain) Real Madrid	1	2	3

Semi-finals
(England) Liverpool	3	0	3
(Italy) Inter Milan	1	3	4
(Hungary) Győri Vasas ETO	0	0	0
(Portugal) Benfica	1	4	5

Final
(Italy) Inter Milan	1
(Portugal) Benfica	0

== First round ==
Team 1	Agg.	Team 2	1st leg	2nd leg
Panathinaikos (Greece)	2–3	(West Germany) 1. FC Köln	1–1	1–2
Liverpool (England)	4–0	(Belgium) Anderlecht	3–0	1–0
Inter Milan (Italy)	7–0	(Romania) Dinamo București	6–0	1–0
Rangers (Scotland)	3–0	(Austria) Rapid Wien	1–0	2–0
DWS (Netherlands)	8–1	(Norway) Lyn	5–0	3–1
Győri Vasas ETO (Hungary)	8–7	(Bulgaria) Lokomotiv Sofia	5–3	3–4
La Chaux-de-Fonds (Switzerland)	1–6	(Portugal) Benfica	1–1	0–5
Real Madrid (Spain)	6–2	(Czechoslovakia) Dukla Prague	4–0	2–2

=== First leg ===
4 November 1964
20:30 CET

La Chaux-de-Fonds (Switzerland)	1–1	(Portugal) Benfica
Antenen 37'	Report	Torres 6'

Stade de la Charrière, La Chaux-de-Fonds
Attendance: 6,482
Referee: Raoul Righi (Italy)

4 November 1964

DWS (Netherlands)	5–0	(Norway) Lyn
Temming 8', 77'; Lenz 35'; Israël 72'; Burgers 83'	Report

Olympisch Stadion, Amsterdam
Attendance: 40,028
Referee: Jack Taylor (England)

11 November 1964
19:15 CET

Inter Milan (Italy)	6–0	(Romania) Dinamo București
Jair 12', 35'; Mazzola 16', 78'; Suárez 38'; Milani 82'	Report

San Siro, Milan
Attendance: 20,376
Referee: Manuel Gómez Arribas (Spain)

11 November 1964

Panathinaikos (Greece)	1–1	(West Germany) 1. FC Köln
Papoutsakis 74'	Report	Müller 25'

Leoforos Alexandras Stadium, Athens
Attendance: 24,243
Referee: Dimitar Rumentchev (Bulgaria)

18 November 1964
21:00 CET

Real Madrid (Spain)	4–0	(Czechoslovakia) Dukla Prague
Amancio 23', 73', 83'; Grosso 33'	Report

Santiago Bernabéu, Madrid
Attendance: 67,067
Referee: Joseph Hannet (Belgium)

18 November 1964
21:30 CET

Rangers (Scotland)	1–0	(Austria) Rapid Wien
Wilson 55'	Report

Ibrox Park, Glasgow
Attendance: 50,788
Referee: Leo Horn (Netherlands)

18 November 1964

Győri Vasas ETO (Hungary)	5–3	(Bulgaria) Lokomotiv Sofia
Győrfi 39', 70'; Korsós 50'; Povázsai 80', 85'	Report	Kotkov 42', 63'; Debarski 65'

Mártirok útja Stadium, Győr
Attendance: 6,874
Referee: Stjepan Varaždinec (Yugoslavia)

25 November 1964
20:30 CET

Liverpool (England)	3–0	(Belgium) Anderlecht
St John 10'; Hunt 43'; Yeats 49'	Report

Anfield, Liverpool
Attendance: 44,616
Referee: Günther Baumgärtel (East Germany)

=== Second leg ===
18 November 1964

Lyn (Norway)	1–3	(Netherlands) DWS
Seemann 67'	Report	Geurtsen 59'; Temming 62'; Hollander 76'

Bislett Stadion, Oslo
Attendance: 7,386
Referee: Erwin Vetter (East Germany)

DWS won 8–1 on aggregate.

25 November 1964

1. FC Köln (West Germany)	2–1	(Greece) Panathinaikos
Thielen 19'; Müller 74'	Report	Komianidis 5'

Müngersdorfer Stadion, Cologne
Attendance: 61,245
Referee: Hugh Phillips (Scotland)

1. FC Köln won 3–2 on aggregate.

2 December 1964
13:30 CET

Dukla Prague (Czechoslovakia)	2–2	(Spain) Real Madrid
Geleta 60', 78'	Report	Felo 14'; Amancio 86'

Stadion Evžena Rošického, Prague
Attendance: 39,290
Referee: Aleksander Góraczniak (Poland)

Real Madrid won 6–2 on aggregate.

3 December 1964
12:45 CET

Dinamo București (Romania)	0–1	(Italy) Inter Milan
	Report	Domenghini 57'

Stadionul August 23, Bucharest
Attendance: 33,741
Referee: Dimitris Wlachojanis (Austria)

Inter Milan won 7–0 on aggregate.

6 December 1964

Lokomotiv Sofia (Bulgaria)	4–3	(Hungary) Győri Vasas ETO
Debarski 9', 39'; Vasilev 29'; Milev 81'	Report	Győrfi 19'; Povázsai 46'; Keglovich 87'

Vasil Levski National Stadium, Sofia
Attendance: 16,303
Referee: Alojz Obtulovič (Czechoslovakia)

Győri Vasas ETO won 8–7 on aggregate.

8 December 1964
14:00 CET

Rapid Wien (Austria)	0–2	(Scotland) Rangers
	Report	Forrest 19'; Wilson 55'

Praterstadion, Vienna
Attendance: 69,272
Referee: Gyula Emsberger (Hungary)

Rangers won 3–0 on aggregate.

9 December 1964
22:00 CET

Benfica (Portugal)	5–0	(Switzerland) La Chaux-de-Fonds
Coluna 35'; Torres 40', 66', 85'; Eusébio 53'	Report

Estádio da Luz, Lisbon
Attendance: 54,471
Referee: Michel Kitabdjian (France)

Benfica won 6–1 on aggregate.

16 December 1964
19:30 CET

Anderlecht (Belgium)	0–1	(England) Liverpool
	Report	Hunt 89'

Heysel Stadium, Brussels
Attendance: 47,998
Referee: Anton Bucheli (Switzerland)

Liverpool won 4–0 on aggregate.

== Quarter-finals ==
Team 1	Agg.	Team 2	1st leg	2nd leg	Play-off
1. FC Köln (West Germany)	0–0 (ct)	(England) Liverpool	0–0	0–0	2–2 (Note: Liverpool advanced to the semi-finals over 1. FC Köln by winning a coin toss, after their play-off match ended 2–2.)
Inter Milan (Italy)	3–2	(Scotland) Rangers	3–1	0–1	
DWS (Netherlands)	1–2	(Hungary) Győri Vasas ETO	1–1	0–1	
Benfica (Portugal)	6–3	(Spain) Real Madrid	5–1	1–2	

=== First leg ===
10 February 1965
20:00 CET

1. FC Köln (West Germany)	0–0	(England) Liverpool
	Report

Müngersdorfer Stadion, Cologne
Attendance: 39,139
Referee: Antonio Sbardella (Italy)

17 February 1965
21:00 CET

Inter Milan (Italy)	3–1	(Scotland) Rangers
Suárez 48'; Peiró 50', 51'	Report	Forrest 64'

San Siro, Milan
Attendance: 49,520
Referee: Dittmar Huber (Switzerland)

24 February 1965
22:45 CET

Benfica (Portugal)	5–1	(Spain) Real Madrid
Augusto 9'; Eusébio 12', 25'; Simões 75'; Coluna 87'	Report	Amancio 58'

Estádio da Luz, Lisbon
Attendance: 64,256
Referee: Kevin Howley (England)

24 February 1965

DWS (Netherlands)	1–1	(Hungary) Győri Vasas ETO
Schrijvers 78' (pen.)	Report	Korsós 21'

Olympisch Stadion, Amsterdam
Attendance: 46,915
Referee: Pierre Schwinte (France)

=== Second leg ===
3 March 1965
21:30 CET

Rangers (Scotland)	1–0	(Italy) Inter Milan
Forrest 6'	Report

Ibrox Park, Glasgow
Attendance: 78,872
Referee: Kurt Tschenscher (West Germany)

Inter Milan won 3–2 on aggregate.

10 March 1965

Győri Vasas ETO (Hungary)	1–0	(Netherlands) DWS
Povázsai 87'	Report

Mártirok útja Stadium, Győr
Attendance: 16,165
Referee: Marian Koczner (Poland)

Győri Vasas ETO won 2–1 on aggregate.

17 March 1965
20:30 CET

Liverpool (England)	0–0	(West Germany) 1. FC Köln
	Report

Anfield, Liverpool
Attendance: 48,948
Referee: Joseph Barbéran (France)

1. FC Köln 0–0 Liverpool on aggregate; play-off needed.

17 March 1965
20:30 CET

Real Madrid (Spain)	2–1	(Portugal) Benfica
Grosso 10'; Gento 70'	Report	Eusébio 40'

Santiago Bernabéu, Madrid
Attendance: 73,012
Referee: Hugh Phillips (Scotland)

Benfica won 6–3 on aggregate.

=== Play-off ===
24 March 1965

Liverpool (England)	2–2 Decided by a coin flip.	(West Germany) 1. FC Köln
St John 21'; Hunt 36'	Report	Thielen 40'; Löhr 48'

De Kuip, Rotterdam
Attendance: 47,862
Referee: Robert Schaut (Belgium)

Liverpool 2–2 1. FC Köln in play-off match. Liverpool qualified on a coin toss.

== Semi-finals ==
Team 1	Agg.	Team 2	1st leg	2nd leg
Liverpool (England)	3–4	(Italy) Inter Milan	3–1	0–3
Győri Vasas ETO (Hungary)	0–5	(Portugal) Benfica	0–1	0–4

=== First leg ===
30 April 1965

Győri Vasas ETO (Hungary)	0–1	(Portugal) Benfica
	Report	Augusto 70'

Népstadion, Budapest
Attendance: 62,327
Referee: Valdemar Hansen (Denmark)

4 May 1965
19:30 CET

Liverpool (England)	3–1	(Italy) Inter Milan
Hunt 4'; Callaghan 34'; St John 75'	Report	Mazzola 10'

Anfield, Liverpool
Attendance: 54,082
Referee: Karl Kainer (Austria)

=== Second leg ===
6 May 1965

Benfica (Portugal)	4–0	(Hungary) Győri Vasas ETO
Eusébio 22', 41'; Torres 34', 40'	Report

Estádio da Luz, Lisbon
Attendance: 43,875
Referee: Michel Kitabdjian (France)

Benfica won 5–0 on aggregate.

12 May 1965
21:15 CET

Inter Milan (Italy)	3–0	(England) Liverpool
Corso 8'; Peiró 9'; Facchetti 60'	Report

San Siro, Milan
Attendance: 76,601
Referee: José María Ortiz (Spain)

Inter Milan won 4–3 on aggregate.

== Final ==
27 May 1965
21:30 CET

Inter Milan (Italy)	1–0	(Portugal) Benfica
Jair 43'	Report

San Siro, Milan
Attendance: 89,000
Referee: Gottfried Dienst (Switzerland)

== Top goalscorers ==
The top scorers from the 1964–65 European Cup (including preliminary round) were as follows:

Rank	Player	Team	Goals
1	(Portugal) José Torres	(Portugal) Benfica	11
2	(Portugal) Eusébio	(Portugal) Benfica	9
3	(England) Roger Hunt	(England) Liverpool	7
3	(Bulgaria) Nikola Kotkov	(Bulgaria) Lokomotiv Sofia	7
5	(Spain) Amancio	(Spain) Real Madrid	6
5	(Scotland) Jim Forrest	(Scotland) Rangers	6
5	(Spain) Paco Gento	(Spain) Real Madrid	6
8	(Bulgaria) Spiro Debarski	(Bulgaria) Lokomotiv Sofia	5
8	(Scotland) Ian St John	(England) Liverpool	5
10	(Netherlands) Frans Geurtsen	(Netherlands) DWS	4
10	(Spain) Ramón Grosso	(Spain) Real Madrid	4
10	(Hungary) László Keglovich	(Hungary) Győri Vasas ETO	4
10	(Sweden) Bo Larsson	(Sweden) Malmö FF	4
10	(Italy) Sandro Mazzola	(Italy) Inter Milan	4
10	(Hungary) László Povázsai	(Hungary) Győri Vasas ETO	4
10	(Netherlands) Mosje Temming	(Netherlands) DWS	4
