= 1963–64 European Cup =

European football tournament

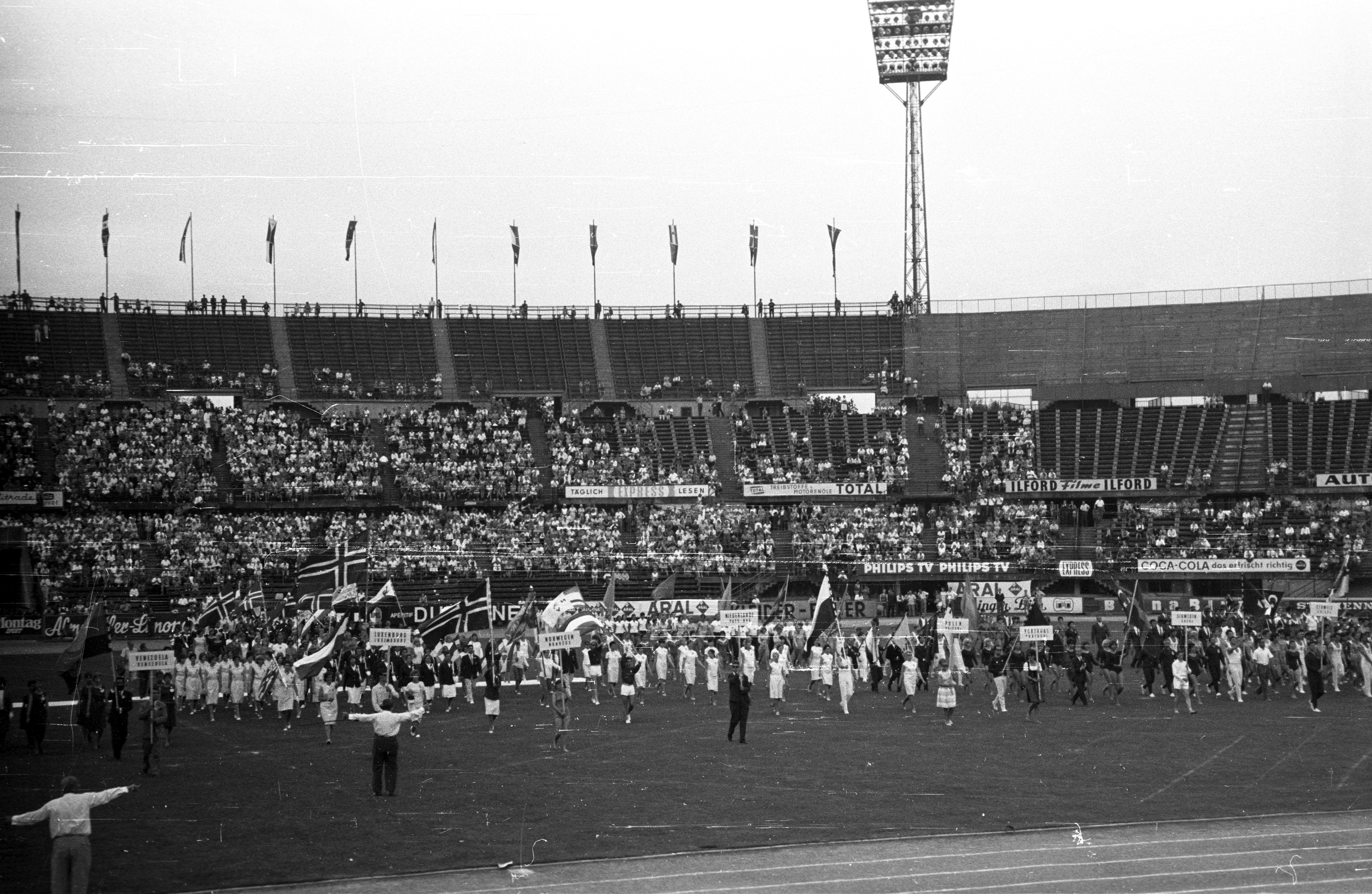
- The Praterstadion in Vienna hosted the final.

Tournament details
- Dates: 10 September 1963 – 27 May 1964
- Teams: 31 (from 30 associations)

Final positions
- Champions: (Italy) Inter Milan (1st title)
- Runners-up: (Spain) Real Madrid

Tournament statistics
- Matches played: 61
- Goals scored: 212 (3.48 per match)
- Attendance: 1,945,888 (31,900 per match)
- Top scorer(s): Vladica Kovačević (Partizan); Sandro Mazzola (Inter Milan); Ferenc Puskás (Real Madrid); 7 goals each

The 1963–64 European Cup was the ninth season of the European Cup, UEFA's premier club football tournament. The competition was won by Inter Milan, who beat Real Madrid 3–1 in the final at Praterstadion, Vienna, on 27 May 1964. Inter's triumph ensured that Italy became the first country and Milan became the first city with two competition winners.

AC Milan were the defending champions, but were eliminated by Real Madrid in the quarter-finals.

Cyprus entered its champion for the first time this season.

== Teams ==
A total of 31 teams participated in the competition.

Italy were represented by two clubs, with Milan qualifying as title holders and Inter Milan as Italian champions. CSKA Red Flag wasn't participating after spell of seven editions, with only ever-present Real Madrid having more appearances in the competition.

Spartak Plovdiv, Anorthosis Famagusta, Motor Jena, Everton, AEK Athens, Ferencváros, Inter Milan, Valletta, Distillery, Lyn, Dundalk and Zürich made their debut in the competition.

PSV Eindhoven returned to the tournament for the first time since inaugural edition, while Borussia Dortmund and Jeunesse Esch returned to the competition after six and three years, respectively.

All participants were their respective associations champions, except for Milan and Lyn. The latter was leading 1. divisjon at the summer break on 1 July 1963, after 9 of 18 matches had been played, but finished second when the league ended in October.

(Albania) Partizani (1st)	Austria Wien (1st)	(Belgium) Standard Liège (1st)	(Bulgaria) Spartak Plovdiv (1st)
(Cyprus) Anorthosis Famagusta (1st)	(Czechoslovakia) Dukla Prague (1st)	(Denmark) Esbjerg (1st)	(East Germany) Motor Jena (1st)
(England) Everton (1st)	(Finland) Valkeakosken Haka (1st)	(France) Monaco (1st)	(Greece) AEK Athens (1st)
(Hungary) Ferencváros (1st)	(Italy) Inter Milan (1st)	(Italy) Milan (3rd)^{TH}	(Luxembourg) Jeunesse Esch (1st)
(Malta) Valletta (1st)	(Netherlands) PSV Eindhoven (1st)	(Northern Ireland) Distillery (1st)	(Norway) Lyn (2nd)
(Poland) Górnik Zabrze (1st)	(Portugal) Benfica (1st)	(Republic of Ireland) Dundalk (1st)	(Romania) Dinamo București (1st)
(Scotland) Rangers (1st)	(Spain) Real Madrid (1st)	(Sweden) IFK Norrköping (1st)	(Switzerland) Zürich (1st)
(Turkey) Galatasaray (1st)	(West Germany) Borussia Dortmund (1st)	(Socialist Federal Republic of Yugoslavia) Partizan (1st)	

== Preliminary round ==
Location of teams in the 1963–64 European Cup

For the first time only title holders Milan received a bye to the first round, due to the number of participating teams. The remaining clubs would play the preliminary round in September and October.

	Pot 1 Western Europe	Pot 2 Northern Europe	Pot 3 Southeastern Europe
Drawn	Northern Ireland; England; Republic of Ireland; Scotland; Italy; Spain; Portugal; Switzerland	West Germany; Netherlands; Belgium; Luxembourg; Denmark; Finland; Norway; Sweden	Romania; Bulgaria; Czechoslovakia; Hungary; Yugoslavia; Turkey; Austria; Albania; Poland; East Germany; France; Malta; Greece; Cyprus

Team 1	Agg.	Team 2	1st leg	2nd leg	Play-off
Everton (England)	0–1	(Italy) Inter Milan	0–0	0–1	
Monaco (France)	8–3	(Greece) AEK Athens	7–2	1–1	
Valkeakosken Haka (Finland)	4–5	(Luxembourg) Jeunesse Esch	4–1	0–4	
Partizan (Socialist Federal Republic of Yugoslavia)	6–1	(Cyprus) Anorthosis Famagusta	3–0	3–1	
Górnik Zabrze (Poland)	1–1	Austria Wien	1–0	0–1	2–1
Dukla Prague (Czechoslovakia)	8–0	(Malta) Valletta	6–0	2–0	
Distillery (Northern Ireland)	3–8	(Portugal) Benfica	3–3	0–5	
Lyn (Norway)	3–7	(West Germany) Borussia Dortmund	2–4	1–3	
Dundalk (Republic of Ireland)	2–4	(Switzerland) Zürich	0–3	2–1	
Galatasaray (Turkey)	4–2	(Hungary) Ferencváros	4–0	0–2	
Partizani (Albania)	2–3	(Bulgaria) Spartak Plovdiv	1–0	1–3	
Esbjerg (Denmark)	4–11	(Netherlands) PSV Eindhoven	3–4	1–7	
Standard Liège (Belgium)	1–2	(Sweden) IFK Norrköping	1–0	0–2	
Dinamo București (Romania)	3–0	(East Germany) SC Motor Jena	2–0	1–0	
Rangers (Scotland)	0–7	(Spain) Real Madrid	0–1	0–6	

=== First leg ===
10 September 1963
20:30 CET

Lyn (Norway)	2–4	(Germany) Borussia Dortmund
Berg 32'; Stavrum 33'	Report	Emmerich 18'; Schmidt 60'; Wosab 65', 76'

Bislett Stadion, Oslo
Attendance: 18,159
Referee: George McCabe (England)

11 September 1963
18:00 CET

Galatasaray (Turkey)	4–0	(Hungary) Ferencváros
Altıntabak 28'; Oktay 50', 84' (pen.); Kutver 61'	Report

Mithatpaşa Stadyumu, Istanbul
Attendance: 19,397
Referee: Karol Galba (Czechoslovakia)

11 September 1963
22:00 CET

Dundalk (Republic of Ireland)	0–3	(Switzerland) Zürich
	Report	Feller 15'; Von Burg 58', 68'

Dalymount Park, Dublin
Attendance: 17,052
Referee: Manuel Gómez Arribas (Spain)

11 September 1963

Partizani (Albania)	1–0	(Bulgaria) Spartak Plovdiv
Kraja 8'	Report

Stadiumi Qemal Stafa, Tirana
Attendance: 15,226
Referee: Konstantin Zečević (Yugoslavia)

11 September 1963

Partizan (Socialist Federal Republic of Yugoslavia)	3–0	(Cyprus) Anorthosis Famagusta
Kovačević 50', 65'; Galić 88'	Report

Stadion JNA, Belgrade
Attendance: 11,033
Referee: Kostadin Dinov (Bulgaria)

15 September 1963

Dukla Prague (Czechoslovakia)	6–0	(Malta) Valletta
Kučera 1', 61', 85'; Šafránek 8'; Brumovský 55'; Jelínek 60'	Report

Stadion Juliska, Prague
Attendance: 9,712
Referee: Alexandros Anagnostopoulos (Greece)

18 September 1963
16:00 CET

Dinamo București (Romania)	2–0	(East Germany) SC Motor Jena
Nunweiller 13'; Petru 74'	Report

Stadionul August 23, Bucharest
Attendance: 19,210
Referee: Edward Budaj (Poland)

18 September 1963
17:00 CET

Górnik Zabrze (Poland)	1–0	Austria Wien
Lentner 71'	Report

Stadion Śląski, Chorzów
Attendance: 89,089
Referee: Anton Bucheli (Switzerland)

18 September 1963
21:30 CET

Everton (England)	0–0	(Italy) Inter Milan
	Report

Goodison Park, Liverpool
Attendance: 62,408
Referee: Gyula Gere (Hungary)

18 September 1963

Monaco (France)	7–2	(Greece) AEK Athens
Cossou 9', 31', 42', 57'; Douis 17', 87'; Dijbrill 22'	Report	Nestoridis 80'; Tasinos 82'

Stade du Ray, Nice
Attendance: 13,406
Referee: Raoul Righi (Italy)

25 September 1963

Valkeakosken Haka (Finland)	4–1	(Luxembourg) Jeunesse Esch
Kumpulampi 5', 68'; Peltonen 42', 76'	Report	Theis 10'

Tehtaan kenttä, Valkeakoski
Attendance: 2,288
Referee: Roland Bäckström (Sweden)

25 September 1963
17:00 CET

Esbjerg (Denmark)	3–4	(Netherlands) PSV Eindhoven
Christiansen 4'; Frandsen 8'; Bertelsen 54'	Report	Theunissen 31'; Kerkhoffs 46', 57'; Brusselers 67'

Esbjerg Stadion, Esbjerg
Attendance: 13,103
Referee: Thomas Wharton (Scotland)

25 September 1963
21:30 CET

Rangers (Scotland)	0–1	(Spain) Real Madrid
	Report	Puskás 86'

Ibrox Park, Glasgow
Attendance: 81,215
Referee: Joseph Barbéran (France)

25 September 1963

Distillery (Northern Ireland)	3–3	(Portugal) Benfica
Kennedy 1'; Hamilton 35'; Ellison 79'	Report	Serafim 15', 60'; Eusébio 58'

Windsor Park, Belfast
Attendance: 19,326
Referee: Joseph Hannet (Belgium)

25 September 1963

Standard Liège (Belgium)	1–0	(Sweden) IFK Norrköping
Pilot 6'	Report

Stade de Sclessin, Liège
Attendance: 23,352
Referee: Kurt Tschenscher (West Germany)

=== Second leg ===
25 September 1963
17:15 CET

SC Motor Jena (East Germany)	0–1	(Romania) Dinamo București
	Report	Țîrcovnicu 55'

Ernst-Abbe-Sportfeld, Jena
Attendance: 11,195
Referee: Włodzimierz Storoniak (Poland)

Dinamo București won 3–0 on aggregate.

25 September 1963
21:00 CET

Inter Milan (Italy)	1–0	(England) Everton
Jair 47'	Report

San Siro, Milan
Attendance: 59,128
Referee: Lajos Horvath (Hungary)

Inter Milan won 1–0 on aggregate.

25 September 1963

Zürich (Switzerland)	1–2	(Republic of Ireland) Dundalk
Feller 79'	Report	Cross 20'; Hasty 60'

Letzigrund, Zürich
Attendance: 14,500
Referee: José María Ortiz (Spain)

Zürich won 4–2 on aggregate.

29 September 1963

Valletta (Malta)	0–2	(Czechoslovakia) Dukla Prague
	Report	Geleta 67'; Jelínek 73'

Empire Stadium, Gżira
Attendance: 7,995
Referee: Antonis Kitsoukalis (Greece)

Dukla Prague won 8–0 on aggregate.

1 October 1963

Anorthosis Famagusta (Cyprus)	1–3	(Socialist Federal Republic of Yugoslavia) Partizan
Kokkinis 16'	Report	Galić 25'; Bajić 53'; Kovačević 85' (pen.)

GSE Stadium, Famagusta
Attendance: 6,245
Referee: Hakki Gürüz (Turkey)

Partizan won 6–1 on aggregate.

2 October 1963

AEK Athens (Greece)	1–1	(France) Monaco
Theofanidis 66'	Report	Szkudlapski 89' (pen.)

AEK Stadium, Athens
Attendance: 12,660
Referee: Gino Rigato (Italy)

Monaco won 8–3 on aggregate.

2 October 1963
19:30 CET

Austria Wien	1–0	(Poland) Górnik Zabrze
Buzek 46'	Report

Praterstadion, Vienna
Attendance: 34,262
Referee: Karl Keller (Switzerland)

Górnik Zabrze 1–1 Austria Wien on aggregate; play-off needed.

2 October 1963
19:30 CET

Borussia Dortmund (Germany)	3–1	(Norway) Lyn
Konietzka 35', 82'; Cyliax 86'	Report	Stavrum 63'

Stadion Rote Erde, Dortmund
Attendance: 10,700
Referee: James Finney (England)

Borussia Dortmund won 7–3 on aggregate.

2 October 1963

Spartak Plovdiv (Bulgaria)	3–1	(Albania) Partizani
Stoinov 9'; Dishkov 37'; Diev 67'	Report	Pano 40'

9 September Stadium, Plovdiv
Attendance: 25,358
Referee: Živko Bajić (Yugoslavia)

Spartak Plovdiv won 3–2 on aggregate.

2 October 1963

Benfica (Portugal)	5–0	(Northern Ireland) Distillery
Eusébio 24', 65'; Simões 37'; Yaúca 67'; Serafim 77'	Report

Estádio da Luz, Lisbon
Attendance: 31,131
Referee: Hubert Burguet (Belgium)

Benfica won 8–3 on aggregate.

3 October 1963

IFK Norrköping (Sweden)	2–0	(Belgium) Standard Liège
Kindvall 41'; Martinsson 60'	Report

Idrottsparken, Norrköping
Attendance: 15,037
Referee: Werner Treichel (West Germany)

IFK Norrköping won 2–1 on aggregate.

9 October 1963
20:30 CET

Real Madrid (Spain)	6–0	(Scotland) Rangers
Puskás 3', 24', 49'; Evaristo 10'; Gento 19'; Ruiz 78'	Report

Santiago Bernabéu, Madrid
Attendance: 90,000
Referee: Marcel Bois (France)

Real Madrid won 7–0 on aggregate.

9 October 1963

Jeunesse Esch (Luxembourg)	4–0	(Finland) Valkeakosken Haka
Theis 17', 85'; Nieminen 42' (o.g.); May 60'	Report

Stade de la Frontière, Esch-sur-Alzette
Attendance: 2,869
Referee: Johan Heinrich Martens (Netherlands)

Jeunesse Esch won 5–4 on aggregate.

9 October 1963

PSV Eindhoven (Netherlands)	7–1	(Denmark) Esbjerg
Kerkhoffs 4', 36'; Giesen 8', 22', 69'; Theunissen 72', 89'	Report	Bertelsen 3'

Philips Sportpark, Eindhoven
Attendance: 8,707
Referee: Hugh Phillips (Scotland)

PSV Eindoven won 11–4 on aggregate.

12 October 1963
15:30 CET

Ferencváros (Hungary)	2–0	(Turkey) Galatasaray
Albert 21' (pen.), 89'	Report

Üllõi úti Stadium, Budapest
Attendance: 27,345
Referee: Stanislav Fencl (Czechoslovakia)

Galatasaray won 4–2 on aggregate.

=== Play-off ===
9 October 1963
19:30 CET

Austria Wien	1–2	(Poland) Górnik Zabrze
Geyer 70'	Report	Pohl 6'; Musiałek 20'

Praterstadion, Vienna
Attendance: 38,229
Referee: Daniel Mellet (Switzerland)

Górnik Zabrze won play-off 2–1.

== Bracket ==
First round
(Poland) Górnik Zabrze	2	1	3
(Czechoslovakia) Dukla Prague	0	4	4
(Portugal) Benfica	2	0	2
(West Germany) Borussia Dortmund	1	5	6
(Luxembourg) Jeunesse Esch	2	2	4
(Socialist Federal Republic of Yugoslavia) Partizan	1	6	7
(Italy) Inter Milan	1	3	4
(France) Monaco	0	1	1
(Bulgaria) Spartak Plovdiv	0	0	0
(Netherlands) PSV Eindhoven	1	0	1
(Switzerland) Zürich (ct)	2	0	2 (2)
(Turkey) Galatasaray	0	2	2 (2)
(Romania) Dinamo București	1	3	4
(Spain) Real Madrid	3	5	8
(Sweden) IFK Norrköping	1	2	3
(Italy) Milan	1	5	6

Quarter-finals
(Czechoslovakia) Dukla Prague	0	3	3
(West Germany) Borussia Dortmund	4	1	5
(Socialist Federal Republic of Yugoslavia) Partizan	0	1	1
(Italy) Inter Milan	2	2	4
(Netherlands) PSV Eindhoven	1	1	2
(Switzerland) Zürich	0	3	3
(Spain) Real Madrid	4	0	4
(Italy) Milan	1	2	3

Semi-finals
(West Germany) Borussia Dortmund	2	0	2
(Italy) Inter Milan	2	2	4
(Switzerland) Zürich	1	0	1
(Spain) Real Madrid	2	6	8

Final
(Italy) Inter Milan	3
(Spain) Real Madrid	1

== First round ==
Team 1	Agg.	Team 2	1st leg	2nd leg	Play-off
Górnik Zabrze (Poland)	3–4	(Czechoslovakia) Dukla Prague	2–0	1–4	
Benfica (Portugal)	2–6	(West Germany) Borussia Dortmund	2–1	0–5	
Jeunesse Esch (Luxembourg)	4–7	(Socialist Federal Republic of Yugoslavia) Partizan	2–1	2–6	
Inter Milan (Italy)	4–1	(France) Monaco	1–0	3–1	
Spartak Plovdiv (Bulgaria)	0–1	(Netherlands) PSV Eindhoven	0–1	0–0	
Zürich (Switzerland)	2–2 (ct)	(Turkey) Galatasaray	2–0	0–2	2–2 (Note: Zürich advanced to the quarter-finals over Galatasaray by winning a coin toss, after their play-off match ended 2–2.)
Dinamo București (Romania)	4–8	(Spain) Real Madrid	1–3	3–5	
IFK Norrköping (Sweden)	3–6	(Italy) Milan	1–1	2–5	

=== First leg ===
6 November 1963

Benfica (Portugal)	2–1	(Germany) Borussia Dortmund
Simões 46'; Eusébio 67'	Report	Wosab 54'

Estádio da Luz, Lisbon
Attendance: 41,252
Referee: Pierre Schwinte (France)

13 November 1963
13:15 CET

Dinamo București (Romania)	1–3	(Spain) Real Madrid
Țîrcovnicu 86'	Report	Ruiz 2'; Di Stéfano 43'; Gento 87'

Stadionul August 23, Bucharest
Attendance: 62,048
Referee: Józef Kowal (Poland)

13 November 1963

Górnik Zabrze (Poland)	2–0	(Czechoslovakia) Dukla Prague
Musiałek 5'; Lubański 49'	Report

Stadion Śląski, Chorzów
Attendance: 76,404
Referee: Gérard Versyp (Belgium)

13 November 1963

Spartak Plovdiv (Bulgaria)	0–1	(Netherlands) PSV Eindhoven
	Report	Kerkhoffs 88'

9 September Stadium, Plovdiv
Attendance: 14,925
Referee: Josef Stoll (Austria)

14 November 1963
20:00 CET

Zürich (Switzerland)	2–0	(Turkey) Galatasaray
Martinelli 20'; Stürmer 83'	Report

Letzigrund, Zürich
Attendance: 24,000
Referee: Tage Sørensen (Denmark)

20 November 1963

Jeunesse Esch (Luxembourg)	2–1	(Socialist Federal Republic of Yugoslavia) Partizan
May 19'; Theis 82'	Report	Galić 33'

Stade de la Frontière, Esch-sur-Alzette
Attendance: 2,921
Referee: Joseph Heymann (Switzerland)

27 November 1963
21:15 CET

Inter Milan (Italy)	1–0	(France) Monaco
Ciccolo 68'	Report

San Siro, Milan
Attendance: 15,366
Referee: Rudolf Kreitlein (West Germany)

27 November 1963
19:00 CET

IFK Norrköping (Sweden)	1–1	(Italy) Milan
Nordqvist 58'	Report	Fortunato 83'

Idrottsparken, Norrköping
Attendance: 15,486
Referee: Andries van Leeuwen (Netherlands)

=== Second leg ===
20 November 1963

Dukla Prague (Czechoslovakia)	4–1	(Poland) Górnik Zabrze
Kučera 18', 46'; Masopust 19'; Jelínek 48'	Report	Szołtysik 56'

Stadion Juliska, Prague
Attendance: 13,123
Referee: Živko Bajić (Yugoslavia)

Dukla Prague won 4–3 on aggregate.

27 November 1963
13:30 CET

Galatasaray (Turkey)	2–0	(Switzerland) Zürich
Oktay 9' (pen.), 50' (pen.)	Report

Mecidiyeköy Stadı, Istanbul
Attendance: 22,987
Referee: Kostadin Dinov (Bulgaria)

Zürich 2–2 Galatasaray on aggregate; play-off needed.

27 November 1963

PSV Eindhoven (Netherlands)	0–0	(Bulgaria) Spartak Plovdiv
	Report

Philips Sportpark, Eindhoven
Attendance: 9,827
Referee: Birger Nilsen (Norway)

PSV Eindhoven won 1–0 on aggregate.

27 November 1963

Partizan (Socialist Federal Republic of Yugoslavia)	6–2	(Luxembourg) Jeunesse Esch
Kovačević 18', 39', 66', 77'; Čebinac 45'; Galić 57'	Report	Langer 20'; Bach 58'

Stadion JNA, Belgrade
Attendance: 8,226
Referee: Václav Korelus (Czechoslovakia)

Partizan won 7–4 on aggregate.

4 December 1963
15:00 CET

Monaco (France)	1–3	(Italy) Inter Milan
Szkudlapski 57' (pen.)	Report	Mazzola 13', 17'; Suárez 90'

Stade Vélodrome, Marseille
Attendance: 25,080
Referee: José María Ortiz (Spain)

Inter Milan won 4–1 on aggregate.

4 December 1963

Milan (Italy)	5–2	(Sweden) IFK Norrköping
Altafini 34', 38', 77'; Nordqvist 43' (o.g.); Rivera 50'	Report	Martinsson 30'; Trebbi 88' (o.g.)

San Siro, Milan
Attendance: 14,282
Referee: Jenõ Gere (Hungary)

Milan won 6–3 on aggregate.

4 December 1963

Borussia Dortmund (Germany)	5–0	(Portugal) Benfica
Konietzka 33'; Brungs 35', 37', 47'; Wosab 58'	Report

Stadion Rote Erde, Dortmund
Attendance: 40,675
Referee: George McCabe (England)

Borussia Dortmund won 6–2 on aggregate.

18 December 1963
20:30 CET

Real Madrid (Spain)	5–3	(Romania) Dinamo București
Ruiz 4'; Di Stéfano 19'; Amancio 51'; Zoco 60'; Puskás 63' (pen.)	Report	Nunweiller 25'; Frățilă 49'; Pârcălab 71' (pen.)

Santiago Bernabéu, Madrid
Attendance: 90,000
Referee: Cesare Jonni (Italy)

Real Madrid won 8–4 on aggregate.

=== Play-off ===
11 December 1963
14:30 CET

Zürich (Switzerland)	2–2 (a.e.t.) Decided by a coin flip.	(Turkey) Galatasaray
Von Burg 77'; Leimgruber 118'	Report	Oktay 85', 92'

Stadio Flaminio, Rome
Attendance: 602
Referee: Giuseppe Adami (Italy)

Zürich 2–2 Galatasaray in play-off match. Zürich qualified on a coin toss.

== Quarter-finals ==
Team 1	Agg.	Team 2	1st leg	2nd leg
Dukla Prague (Czechoslovakia)	3–5	(West Germany) Borussia Dortmund	0–4	3–1
Partizan (Socialist Federal Republic of Yugoslavia)	1–4	(Italy) Inter Milan	0–2	1–2
PSV Eindhoven (Netherlands)	2–3	(Switzerland) Zürich	1–0	1–3
Real Madrid (Spain)	4–3	(Italy) Milan	4–1	0–2

=== First leg ===
29 January 1964
20:30 CET

Real Madrid (Spain)	4–1	(Italy) Milan
Amancio 17'; Puskás 44'; Di Stéfano 59'; Gento 64'	Report	Lodetti 83'

Santiago Bernabéu, Madrid
Attendance: 120,000
Referee: Joseph Barbéran (France)

26 February 1964
15:00 CET

Partizan (Socialist Federal Republic of Yugoslavia)	0–2	(Italy) Inter Milan
	Report	Jair 48'; Mazzola 89'

Stadion JNA, Belgrade
Attendance: 19,509
Referee: Josef Stoll (Austria)

4 March 1964

PSV Eindhoven (Netherlands)	1–0	(Switzerland) Zürich
Theunissen 85'	Report

Philips Sportpark, Eindhoven
Attendance: 8,589
Referee: Arthur Holland (England)

4 March 1964

Dukla Prague (Czechoslovakia)	0–4	(Germany) Borussia Dortmund
	Report	Brungs 30'; Konietzka 56'; Wosab 70' (pen.), 89'

Stadion Dr. Václava Vacka, Prague
Attendance: 21,920
Referee: Gino Rigato (Italy)

=== Second leg ===
13 February 1964
15:30 CET

Milan (Italy)	2–0	(Spain) Real Madrid
Lodetti 6'; Altafini 46'	Report

San Siro, Milan
Attendance: 70,491
Referee: Gottfried Dienst (Switzerland)

Real Madrid won 4–3 on aggregate.

4 March 1964
15:30 CET

Inter Milan (Italy)	2–1	(Socialist Federal Republic of Yugoslavia) Partizan
Corso 25'; Jair 42'	Report	Bajić 68'

San Siro, Milan
Attendance: 32,100
Referee: Kurt Tschenscher (West Germany)

Inter Milan won 4–1 on aggregate.

11 March 1964

Zürich (Switzerland)	3–1	(Netherlands) PSV Eindhoven
Stürmer 2'; Brizzi 18'; Rüfli 56'	Report	Verdonk 35'

Letzigrund, Zürich
Attendance: 15,452
Referee: Juan Gardeazábal (Spain)

Zürich won 3–2 on aggregate.

18 March 1964

Borussia Dortmund (Germany)	1–3	(Czechoslovakia) Dukla Prague
Rylewicz 20'	Report	Rödr 40'; Jelínek 68', 87'

Stadion Rote Erde, Dortmund
Attendance: 42,415
Referee: William Brittle (Scotland)

Borussia Dortmund won 5–3 on aggregate.

== Semi-finals ==
Team 1	Agg.	Team 2	1st leg	2nd leg
Borussia Dortmund (West Germany)	2–4	(Italy) Inter Milan	2–2	0–2
Zürich (Switzerland)	1–8	(Spain) Real Madrid	1–2	0–6

=== First leg ===
15 April 1964
19:30 CET

Borussia Dortmund (West Germany)	2–2	(Italy) Inter Milan
Brungs 23', 28'	Report	Mazzola 4'; Corso 41'

Stadion Rote Erde, Dortmund
Attendance: 42,356
Referee: Jenő Gere (Hungary)

22 April 1964
20:00 CET

Zürich (Switzerland)	1–2	(Spain) Real Madrid
Brizzi 71'	Report	Di Stéfano 16'; Felo 25'

Letzigrund, Zürich
Attendance: 28,394
Referee: Joseph Hannet (Belgium)

=== Second leg ===
29 April 1964
21:15 CET

Inter Milan (Italy)	2–0	(West Germany) Borussia Dortmund
Mazzola 48'; Jair 75'	Report

San Siro, Milan
Attendance: 76,788
Referee: Branko Tesanić (Yugoslavia)

Inter Milan won 4–2 on aggregate.

7 May 1964
20:00 CET

Real Madrid (Spain)	6–0	(Switzerland) Zürich
Zoco 9'; Felo 14'; Muller 16'; Puskás 70'; Di Stéfano 79'; Amancio 87'	Report

Santiago Bernabéu, Madrid
Attendance: 110,000
Referee: Jean Tricot (France)

Real Madrid won 8–1 on aggregate.

== Final ==
27 May 1964

Inter Milan (Italy)	3–1	(Spain) Real Madrid
Mazzola 43', 76'; Milani 61'	Report	Felo 70'

Praterstadion, Vienna
Attendance: 71,333
Referee: Josef Stoll (Austria)

== Top goalscorers ==
The top scorers from the 1963–64 European Cup (including preliminary round) were as follows:

Rank	Player	Team	Goals
1	(Socialist Federal Republic of Yugoslavia) Vladica Kovačević	(Socialist Federal Republic of Yugoslavia) Partizan	7
1	(Italy) Sandro Mazzola	(Italy) Inter Milan	7
1	(Hungary) Ferenc Puskás	(Spain) Real Madrid	7
4	(West Germany) Franz Brungs	(West Germany) Borussia Dortmund	6
4	(Turkey) Metin Oktay	(Turkey) Galatasaray	6
4	(West Germany) Reinhold Wosab	(West Germany) Borussia Dortmund	6
7	(Spain) Alfredo Di Stéfano	(Spain) Real Madrid	5
7	(Czechoslovakia) Josef Jelínek	(Czechoslovakia) Dukla Prague	5
7	(Netherlands) Pierre Kerkhoffs	(Netherlands) PSV Eindhoven	5
7	(Czechoslovakia) Rudolf Kučera	(Czechoslovakia) Dukla Prague	5
