= 1963–64 Irish League =

Irish League
- Season: 1963–64
- Champions: Glentoran; 11th Irish title
- Matches played: 132
- Goals scored: 564 (4.27 per match)
- Top goalscorer: Trevor Thompson (21 goals)

Location of teams in the Irish League from 1949–1972
Location of Belfast-based teams in the Irish League from 1949–1971

The 1963–64 Irish League was the 63rd edition of the Irish League, the highest level of league competition in Northern Irish football. The league consisted of 12 teams, and Glentoran won the championship.

== League standings ==
Pos	Team	Pld	W	D	L	GF	GA	GR	Pts	Qualification
1	Glentoran	22	14	5	3	59	29	2.034	33	European Cup preliminary round and Inter-Cities Fairs Cup
2	Coleraine	22	14	4	4	40	25	1.600	32	
3	Derry City	22	13	3	6	59	33	1.788	29	Qualification for the European Cup Winners' Cup first round
4	Linfield	22	12	4	6	53	38	1.395	28	
5	Portadown	22	12	3	7	49	36	1.361	27	
6	Ballymena United	22	11	2	9	55	52	1.058	24	
7	Distillery	22	9	5	8	63	46	1.370	23	
8	Glenavon	22	10	1	11	51	50	1.020	21	
9	Crusaders	22	8	2	12	40	41	0.976	18	
10	Ards	22	7	3	12	45	58	0.776	17	
11	Bangor	22	2	2	18	26	76	0.342	6	
12	Cliftonville	22	2	2	18	24	80	0.300	6	

Source: rsssf.com

== Results ==
Home \ Away	ARD	BAN	BLM	CLI	COL	CRU	DIS	DER	GLV	GLT	LIN	POR
Ards		4–0	2–3	5–0	1–3	4–2	2–2	4–3	2–4	2–2	3–1	0–1
Bangor	0–2		2–3	3–3	0–3	2–6	2–7	1–3	4–1	1–5	0–2	1–2
Ballymena United	3–3	1–2		6–0	2–1	3–2	2–1	1–3	3–2	0–3	1–4	4–2
Cliftonville	0–6	3–2	1–3		1–2	2–1	3–4	0–4	2–5	0–2	0–2	0–4
Coleraine	3–0	2–1	1–0	4–3		2–1	4–1	0–1	2–1	2–2	1–4	2–1
Crusaders	3–1	3–0	0–2	4–0	0–2		1–5	3–1	1–2	3–1	2–2	2–1
Distillery	6–1	6–1	5–2	3–3	2–2	2–0		0–3	4–0	3–3	0–1	2–2
Derry City	6–1	1–1	5–5	3–0	0–0	3–1	2–1		5–2	5–0	1–0	3–1
Glenavon	6–0	4–1	5–3	5–1	1–3	0–1	4–3	2–1		0–1	2–1	1–3
Glentoran	2–0	4–0	3–2	5–0	0–0	3–2	3–1	4–3	1–1		3–2	4–0
Linfield	5–2	4–2	1–3	2–0	3–0	1–1	3–1	4–2	6–2	1–8		2–2
Portadown	3–0	7–0	4–3	5–2	0–1	2–1	2–4	2–1	2–1	1–0	2–2	

Source: Irish League Archive
Legend: Blue = home team win; Yellow = draw; Red = away team win.

== Top scorers ==
Pos	Player	Club	Pld	Goals
1	Trevor Thompson	Glentoran	20	21
2	Phil Scott	Linfield	21	20
3	Denis Guy	Glenavon	22	19
4	Billy Johnston	Glenavon	17	17
5	Ken Halliday	Coleraine	21	16
6	John Cochrane	Distillery	15	15
=	Tom Sterritt	Ards	22	15
8	Fay Coyle	Derry City	15	14
9	Joe Meldrum	Distillery	17	13
=	Sammy Pavis	Glentoran	18	13
