= John Kennedy (Northern Irish footballer) =

Northern Irish footballer (born 1939)

Personal information
- Full name: John Kennedy
- Date of birth: 4 September 1939 (age 87)
- Place of birth: Newtownards, Northern Ireland
- Height: 6 ft 3 in (1.91 m)
- Position: Goalkeeper

Senior career*
Years	Team	Apps	(Gls)
1957–1965	Distillery	241	(0)
1965–1967	Celtic	0	(0)
1967	Detroit Cougars	12	(0)
1967–1974	Lincoln City	251	(0)
1974–1976	Lincoln United		

International career
1961–1965	Northern Ireland amateur	7	(0)
1964	Great Britain	2	(0)
1964	Irish League	3	(0)
- * Club domestic league appearances and goals

John Kennedy (born 4 September 1939), widely known as Jack Kennedy, is a former professional footballer from Northern Ireland who played as a goalkeeper. He played for several years for Distillery in his native country before turning professional with Celtic. After a spell in the United States with the Detroit Cougars, he spent seven years with English Football League club Lincoln City and had a spell in non-League football with Lincoln United. Kennedy was an amateur international for Northern Ireland, played for the Irish League representative team, and kept goal for Great Britain in qualifying matches for the 1964 Summer Olympics.

== Life and club career ==
Kennedy was born in Newtownards, Northern Ireland. He attended a rugby-playing school, but played association football for Boys' Brigade and church teams. When he was 18, he signed for Distillery as an amateur. He made his first-team debut in 1958, and soon became the club's regular goalkeeper. He helped Distillery win the Irish League title in 1962–63 – their first championship in 60 years – in a 4–2 defeat of their nearest rivals, Linfield, on the last day of the season, and played on the losing side against the same opposition in the 1963 Irish Cup Final. The League win afforded qualification for the preliminary round of the European Cup, in which Distillery were drawn against Portuguese champions Benfica, who had reached the final the previous year. Kennedy kept goal as Distillery, captained by the 41-year-old former England international Tom Finney, who was reportedly paid £500 to come out of retirement to play in the game, held the twice European champions to a 3–3 draw. They lost the second leg 5–0. By the end of his Distillery career, Kennedy had played 241 games in the Irish League, and had won the County Antrim Shield in 1964 and the City Cup twice.

In March 1965, Kennedy turned professional and became Jock Stein's first signing as manager of Celtic, for a £5,000 fee. He played only one first-team game for the club in two seasons. He replaced regular goalkeeper John Fallon for the second leg of a League Cup quarter-final against Raith Rovers, and kept a clean sheet as Celtic progressed 12–1 on aggregate, but Stein selected Ronnie Simpson for the next Scottish League match, and it was Simpson who established himself in the starting eleven. Kennedy was released at the end of the 1966–67 season, and guested for the Glentoran team that played as the Detroit Cougars in the United Soccer Association, an embryonic professional league in the United States whose inaugural season featured only imported teams.

On his return, he signed for Lincoln City of the Football League Fourth Division. He went straight into the first team, and was ever-present for his first 18 months. A fractured elbow, sustained in the first half of an FA Cup replay against Chester which Lincoln won to earn a third-round meeting with First Division club Birmingham City, kept him out for the second half of the 1968–69 season, but once he regained fitness he kept his place as first-choice goalkeeper until ending his Football League career at the end of the 1973–74 season. He had played 278 senior matches for the club, of which 251 came in the Football League. In 1970, Kennedy was the first to receive Lincoln City's Supporters' Club Player of the Season award. He remained with the club for a time as a youth coach, and played for Lincoln United in the Yorkshire League. A cartilage operation put an end to his playing career.

While at Lincoln City, Kennedy had combined football with a teaching career. He remained in the Lincoln area after he finished playing football, where he taught at the City School until his retirement in 1994.

== Representative football ==
Kennedy won seven caps for the Northern Ireland amateur international team. He played twice in early 1961, against Wales and Scotland in the British amateur Home Championship, and in five consecutive games from September 1963 against England to January 1965 against Wales. He "put up a brilliant show during the spells of heavy Welsh pressure" in 1964 to ensure a draw, which combined with a defeat of England and a draw with Scotland contributed to Northern Ireland winning that year's British amateur championship outright.

After the other goalkeeper in Great Britain's squad, Griffin of Leytonstone, struggled in a 4–0 defeat in a warmup match against a Manchester United reserve team, the Daily Express predicted that Kennedy would keep goal in the Olympic qualifier against Greece. He did, conceding once in the first leg at Stamford Bridge as Britain took a 2–1 lead, and a "sparkling display" in another warmup match, against Coventry City, meant he kept his place for the away leg, which Greece won 4–1.

That same year he represented the Irish League in inter-league matches. He played twice against the League of Ireland XI, a 4–2 loss in which he saved a penalty and a 2–2 draw, and once in a 4–0 defeat to the Football League XI.

== Honours ==
Northern Ireland Amateur XI

- British Championship: 1964

Distillery

- Irish League winners: 1962–63
- Irish Cup runners-up: 1962–63
- City Cup winners: 1959–60, 1962–63
- County Antrim Shield winners: 1963–64
- County Antrim Shield runners-up: 1958–59
