= AFC DWS =

Dutch football club

DWS
- Full name: Door Wilskracht Sterk
- Founded: 11 October 1907; 119 years ago (as Fortuna)
- Ground: Spieringhorn, Amsterdam
- League: Saturday Derde Klasse B (West 1) (2024–25)
- Website: www.afcdws.com
Home colours

Amsterdamsche Football Club Door Wilskracht Sterk (lit. 'Amsterdam Football Club Strong Through Willpower'), also referred to as AFC DWS, Door Wilskracht Sterk or simply DWS, is a Dutch football club from Amsterdam, currently competing in the Derde Klasse (lit. 'Third Class'), the sixth tier of amateur football in the Netherlands.

== History ==
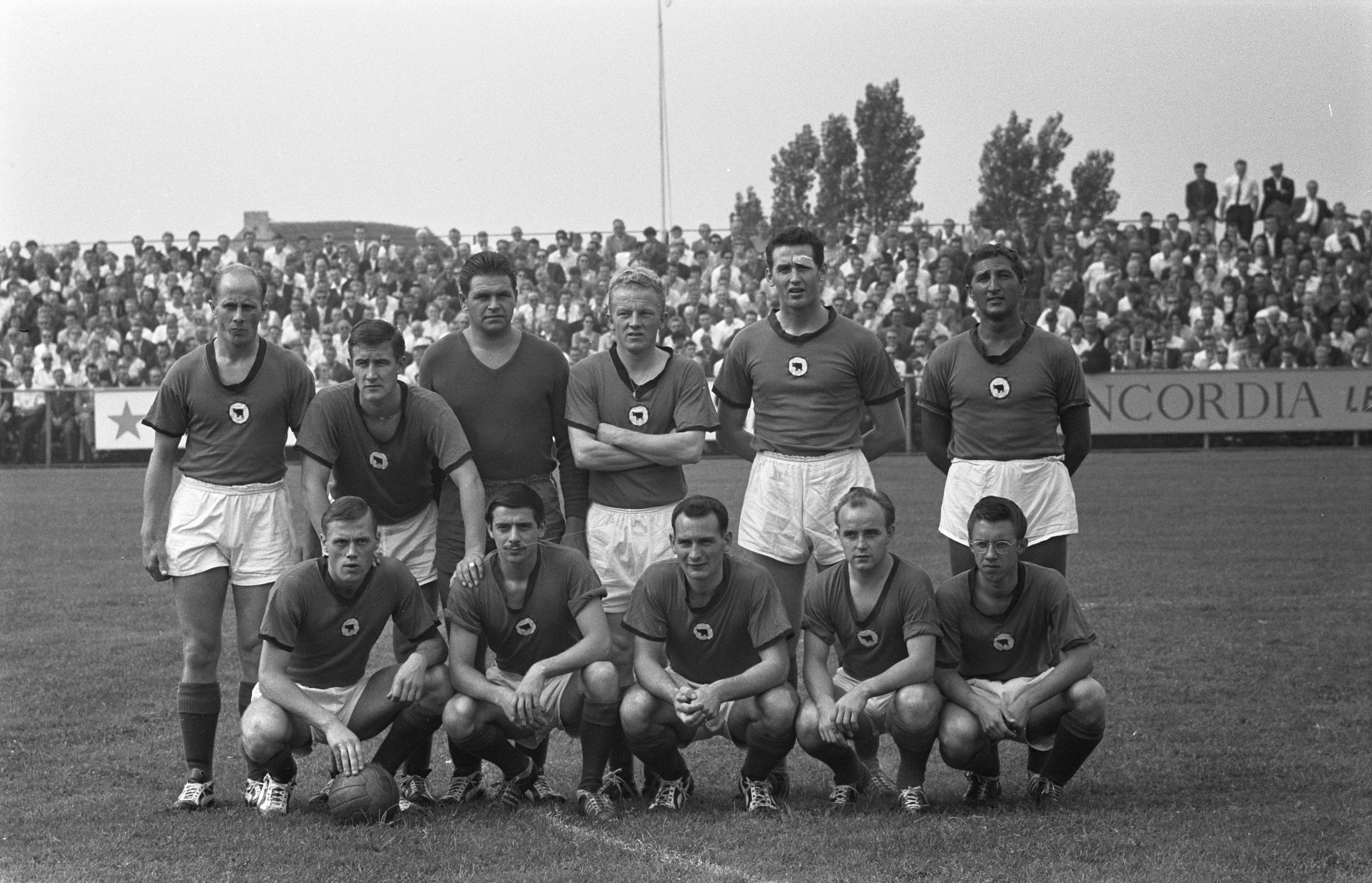
AFC DWS before a match against FC Volendam, August 1959.

AFC DWS was founded on 11 October 1907, by the trio of Robert Beijerbacht, Theo Beijerbacht and Jan van Galen under the name of Fortuna which was soon changed to Hercules. The team played in a blue and white striped shirt and white shorts. On 22 March 1909 the name was changed to DWS and the shirt colours became blue and black vertical stripes.

In 1954, the club entered professional football, playing its home matches in the Olympic Stadium in Amsterdam. It merged in 1958 with BVC Amsterdam into DWS/A. That name was dropped again in 1962 and turned back into DWS. DWS became champions of the Eredivisie in 1964, the same year they were promoted from the Eerste Divisie, which is a feat that has never been repeated. DWS then reached the quarter-finals of the 1964–65 European Cup, in the next season. Their 1964 triumph is the most recent occasion of a club without a predominantly red and white home strip winning the Eredivisie title, a drought of 60 years.

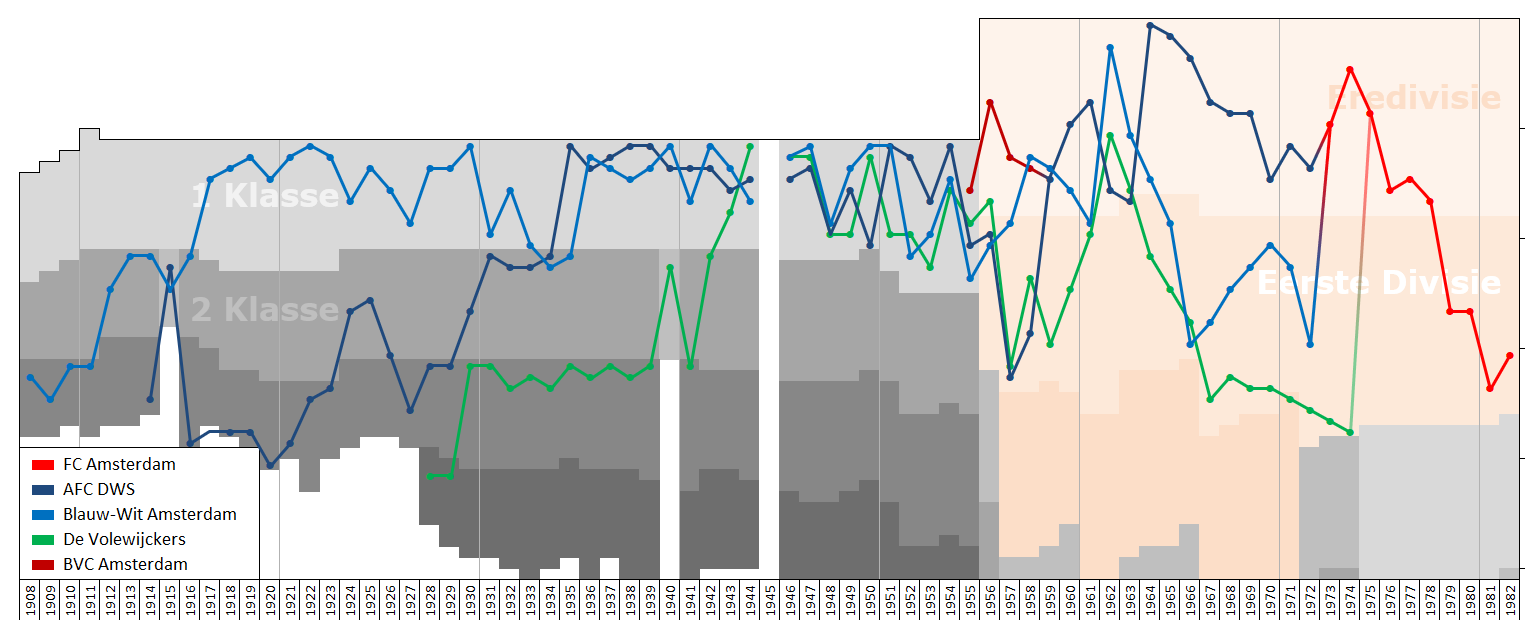
Historical chart of FC Amsterdam league performance (DWS shown in dark blue)

In 1972, the club merged with Blauw-Wit Amsterdam and Volewijckers to form FC Amsterdam. DWS continued as an amateur club. They celebrated their 100th anniversary in 2007.

=== Professional football results (1954–1972) ===
10 B

2 A

15 A

11 A

15

10

8

16

1

1

2

4

8

9

9

15

12

14

55
56
57
58
59
60
61
62
63
64
65
66
67
68
69
70
71
72

Eredivisie	Eerste divisie
Eerste Klasse 54/55-55/56

- 1954 – 1958: DWS
- 1958 – 1962: DWS/A
- 1962 – 1972: DWS

== DWS in Europe ==
Season	Competition	Round	Country	Club	Score	UCP (1)
1964–65	International Football Cup	Group stage	Switzerland	FC La Chaux-de-Fonds	1–2, 1–0	0.0
1964–65	International Football Cup	Group stage	Germany	Eintracht Braunschweig	4–0, 0–2	0.0
1964–65	International Football Cup	Group stage	Belgium	FC Beringen	5–0, 3–2	0.0
1964–65	International Football Cup	First Round			never played (2)	0.0
1964–65	International Football Cup	Quarterfinals	Belgium	RFC de Liège	never played (3)	0.0
1964–65	European Cup	Qualification	Turkey	Fenerbahçe SK	3–1, 1–0	10.0
1964–65	European Cup	Round of 16	Norway	SFK Lyn Oslo	5–0, 3–1	10.0
1964–65	European Cup	Quarterfinals	Hungary	Vasas ETO Győr	1–1, 0–1	10.0
1966–67	International Football Cup	Group stage	Italy	Atalanta Bergamo	1–0, 1–0	0.0
1966–67	International Football Cup	Group stage	Switzerland	FC Grenchen	4–2, 5–3	0.0
1966–67	International Football Cup	Group stage	France	RC Strasbourg	4–1, 2–1	0.0
1966–67	International Football Cup	Quarterfinals	Poland	Zagłębie Sosnowiec	2–2, 0–3	0.0
1966–67	Inter-Cities Fairs Cup	Second round	England	Leeds United	1–3, 1–5	0.0
1967–68	Inter-Cities Fairs Cup	First round	Scotland	Dundee	2–1, 0–3	2.0
1968–69	Inter-Cities Fairs Cup	First round	Belgium	Beerschot VAV	1–1, 2–1	5.0
1968–69	Inter-Cities Fairs Cup	Second round	England	Chelsea	0–0, 0–0 (c)	5.0
1968–69	Inter-Cities Fairs Cup	Round of 16	Scotland	Rangers	0–2, 1–2	5.0

(1) UCP = UEFA Co-efficiency points. Total number of points for UEFA Coefficient: 17.0
(2) DWS skipped this round, since they were still active in the Europacup I
(3) DWS are eliminated from the tournament since they are still active in the Europacup I

== Former players ==
=== National team players ===
The following players were called up to represent their national teams in international football and received caps during their tenure with AFC DWS:

- Netherlands
- (Netherlands) Joop Burgers (1960–1969)
- (Netherlands) Bertus Caldenhove (1931–1940)
- (Netherlands) Guus Dräger (1937–1941)
- (Netherlands) Frits Flinkevleugel (1958–1972)
- (Netherlands) Frans Geurtsen (1963–1971)
- (Netherlands) Dick Hollander (1959–1968)
- (Netherlands) Rinus Israël (1962–1966)
- (Netherlands) Jan Jongbloed (1959–1972)
- (Netherlands) Rob Rensenbrink (1965–1969)
- (Netherlands) Daan Schrijvers (1963–1965)
- (Netherlands) Piet Spel (1946–1956)
- (Netherlands) Bram Wiertz (1937–1957)
  Norway
- (Norway) Finn Seemann (1968–1971)

- Years in brackets indicate careerspan with AFC DWS.

== Players in international tournaments ==
The following is a list of AFC DWS players who have competed in international tournaments, including the FIFA World Cup. To this date no DWS players have participated in the UEFA European Championship, Africa Cup of Nations, Copa América, CONCACAF Gold Cup, AFC Asian Cup or the OFC Nations Cup while playing for AFC DWS.

Cup	Players
(France) 1938 FIFA World Cup	(Netherlands) Bertus Caldenhove
