= 1962–63 Ekstraklasa =

37th season of top-tier football league in Poland

Liga
- Season: 1962–63
- Champions: Górnik Zabrze (4th title)
- Relegated: Lechia Gdańsk; Lech Poznań
- Top goalscorer: Marian Kielec (18 goals)

Statistics of Ekstraklasa for the 1962–63 season.

== Overview ==
It was contested by 14 teams, and Górnik Zabrze won the championship.

== League table ==
Pos	Team	Pld	W	D	L	GF	GA	GD	Pts	Qualification or relegation
1	Górnik Zabrze (C)	26	19	4	3	69	26	+43	42	Qualification to European Cup preliminary round
2	Ruch Chorzów	26	15	7	4	55	33	+22	37	
3	Zagłębie Sosnowiec	26	16	4	6	54	28	+26	36	Qualification to Cup Winners' Cup preliminary round
4	Polonia Bytom	26	14	6	6	52	41	+11	34	
5	Odra Opole	26	12	5	9	29	27	+2	29	
6	Arkonia Szczecin	26	9	8	9	32	38	−6	26	
7	Legia Warsaw	26	7	11	8	29	25	+4	25	
8	Wisła Kraków	26	10	5	11	35	33	+2	25	
9	Stal Rzeszów	26	7	9	10	33	39	−6	23	
10	Gwardia Warsaw	26	10	3	13	31	43	−12	23	
11	Pogoń Szczecin	26	7	5	14	31	45	−14	19	
12	ŁKS Łódź	26	6	7	13	27	43	−16	19	
13	Lechia Gdańsk (R)	26	6	3	17	20	48	−28	15	Relegated to II liga
14	Lech Poznań (R)	26	3	5	18	19	47	−28	11	Relegated to II liga

Source: 90minut.pl (in Polish)
(C) Champions; (R) Relegated

== Results ==
Home \ Away	AKN	GÓR	GWA	LPO	LGD	LEG	ŁKS	OOP	POG	BYT	RUC	SRZ	WIS	ZSO
Arkonia Szczecin		1–3	1–1	0–0	3–0	0–0	1–1	1–3	2–0	0–0	5–2	2–1	2–1	2–1
Górnik Zabrze	4–0		3–0	1–0	4–1	3–0	3–3	3–1	4–1	4–2	1–1	3–1	2–1	3–0
Gwardia Warsaw	3–1	1–7		4–1	2–1	0–0	2–1	0–1	1–1	0–2	1–2	0–3	1–0	2–1
Lech Poznań	2–1	2–1	0–2		3–0	0–0	0–0	0–1	1–2	1–2	0–3	1–1	0–2	0–1
Lechia Gdańsk	3–0	0–0	0–3	1–0		1–1	3–0	1–0	2–0	2–3	1–3	1–1	0–1	1–2
Legia Warsaw	2–0	1–4	0–1	3–0	8–1		0–0	1–1	3–0	1–2	2–4	0–1	2–1	1–1
ŁKS Łódź	0–2	1–3	3–2	2–1	1–0	0–0		1–0	2–0	1–1	1–3	1–1	3–0	1–2
Odra Opole	0–1	0–3	3–1	1–0	1–0	0–1	1–0		1–0	2–0	1–1	2–0	3–1	1–5
Pogoń Szczecin	0–2	1–2	4–1	1–0	2–0	1–1	3–0	3–3		0–1	3–1	0–0	1–2	2–5
Polonia Bytom	6–1	1–2	2–0	3–2	3–0	0–0	4–3	0–2	3–2		1–4	2–2	2–1	2–1
Ruch Chorzów	1–1	2–1	2–1	2–2	1–0	0–2	4–0	2–0	4–0	3–3		2–0	2–1	1–1
Stal Rzeszów	2–2	1–1	1–2	3–2	0–1	2–0	3–0	0–0	2–1	3–5	1–3		2–1	1–1
Wisła Kraków	1–1	0–3	2–0	4–0	3–0	2–0	2–1	1–1	1–1	1–1	1–1	2–0		1–0
Zagłębie Sosnowiec	1–0	4–1	1–0	6–1	3–0	0–0	2–1	1–0	1–2	3–1	3–1	4–1	4–2	

Source: 90minut.pl (in Polish)
Legend: Blue = home team win; Yellow = draw; Red = away team win.

== Top goalscorers ==
Rank	Player	Club	Goals
1	(Poland) Marian Kielec	Pogoń Szczecin	18
2	(Poland) Eugeniusz Faber	Ruch Chorzów	16
2	(Poland) Jan Liberda	Polonia Bytom	16
4	(Poland) Reinhold Kosider	Zagłębie Sosnowiec	14
4	(Poland) Jerzy Musiałek	Górnik Zabrze	14
4	(Poland) Norbert Pogrzeba	Polonia Bytom	14
4	(Poland) Erwin Wilczek	Górnik Zabrze	14
8	(Poland) Józef Gałeczka	Zagłębie Sosnowiec	13
9	(Poland) Ernest Pol	Górnik Zabrze	12
10	(Poland) Joachim Czok	Górnik Zabrze	10
10	(Poland) Roman Kasprzyk	Ruch Chorzów	10

== Attendances ==
#	Club	Average
1	Pogoń Szczecin	16,462
2	Zagłębie Sosnowiec	15,000
3	Wisła Kraków	14,692
4	Polonia Bytom	13,385
5	Górnik Zabrze	13,154
6	Stal Rzeszów	12,615
7	Ruch Chorzów	12,385
8	Lech Poznań	11,385
9	ŁKS	11,385
10	Arkonia Szczecin	11,154
11	Lechia Gdańsk	8,154
12	Legia Warszawa	7,923
13	Odra Opole	6,769
14	Gwardia Warszawa	4,231
