= Bologna FC 1909 in European football =

Italian club in European football

- Club: Bologna
- Seasons played: 12
- First entry: 1964–65 European Cup
- Latest entry: 2025–26 UEFA Europa League

Titles
- Intertoto Cup: 1: 1998

These are the matches that Bologna have played in European football competitions. The club's first entry into European competitions was the 1964–65 European Cup, with their most recent entry being the 2025–26 UEFA Europa League. Their only European trophy so far came via the 1998 UEFA Intertoto Cup.

== UEFA-organised seasonal competitions ==
Bologna's score listed first.

=== European Cup / UEFA Champions League ===
Season	Round	Opponent	Home	Away	Aggregate	Reference
1964–65	Preliminary round	(Belgium) Anderlecht	2–1	0–1	2–2 (coin flip)	
2024–25	League phase	(Ukraine) Shakhtar Donetsk	0–0	—N/a	28th	
2024–25	League phase	(England) Liverpool	—N/a	0–2	28th	
2024–25	League phase	(England) Aston Villa	—N/a	0–2	28th	
2024–25	League phase	(France) Monaco	0–1	—N/a	28th	
2024–25	League phase	(France) Lille	1–2	—N/a	28th	
2024–25	League phase	(Portugal) Benfica	—N/a	0–0	28th	
2024–25	League phase	(Germany) Borussia Dortmund	2–1	—N/a	28th	
2024–25	League phase	(Portugal) Sporting CP	—N/a	1–1	28th	

=== European Cup Winners' Cup ===
Season	Round	Opponent	Home	Away	Aggregate	Reference
1970–71	First round	(East Germany) Vorwärts Berlin	1–1	0–0	1–1 (a)	
1974–75	First round	(Poland) Gwardia Warsaw	2–1 (a.e.t.)	1–2	3–3 (3–5 p)	

=== UEFA Cup / UEFA Europa League ===
Season	Round	Opponent	Home	Away	Aggregate	Reference
1971–72	First round	(Belgium) Anderlecht	1–1	2–0	3–1	
1971–72	Second round	(Socialist Federal Republic of Yugoslavia) Željezničar	2–2	1–1	3–3 (a)	
1990–91	First round	(Poland) Zagłębie Lubin	1–0	1–0	2–0	
1990–91	Second round	(Scotland) Heart of Midlothian	3–0	1–3	4–3	
1990–91	Third round	(Austria) Admira Wacker	3–0 (a.e.t.)	0–3	3–3 (6–5 p)	
1990–91	Quarter-finals	(Portugal) Sporting CP	1–1	0–2	1–3	
1998–99	First round	(Portugal) Sporting CP	2–1	2–0	4–1	
1998–99	Second round	(Czech Republic) Slavia Prague	2–1	2–0	4–1	
1998–99	Third round	(Spain) Real Betis	4–1	0–1	4–2	
1998–99	Quarter-finals	(France) Lyon	3–0	0–2	3–2	
1998–99	Semi-finals	(France) Marseille	1–1	0–0	1–1 (a)	
1999–2000	First round	(Russia) Zenit Saint Petersburg	2–2	3–0	5–2	
1999–2000	Second round	(Belgium) Anderlecht	3–0	1–2	4–2	
1999–2000	Third round	(Turkey) Galatasaray	1–1	1–2	2–3	
2025–26	League phase	(England) Aston Villa	—N/a	0–1	10th	
2025–26	League phase	(Germany) SC Freiburg	1–1	—N/a	10th	
2025–26	League phase	(Romania) FCSB	—N/a	2–1	10th	
2025–26	League phase	(Norway) Brann	0–0	—N/a	10th	
2025–26	League phase	(Austria) Red Bull Salzburg	4–1	—N/a	10th	
2025–26	League phase	(Spain) Celta Vigo	—N/a	2–1	10th	
2025–26	League phase	(Scotland) Celtic	2–2	—N/a	10th	
2025–26	League phase	(Israel) Maccabi Tel Aviv	—N/a	3–0	10th	
2025–26	Knockout phase play-offs	(Norway) Brann	1–0	1–0	2–0	
2025–26	Round of 16	(Italy) Roma	1–1	4–3 (a.e.t.)	5–4	
2025–26	Quarter-finals	(England) Aston Villa	1–3	0–4	1–7	

=== UEFA Intertoto Cup ===
Season	Round	Opponent	Home	Away	Aggregate	Reference
1998	Third round	(Romania) Național București	2–0	1–3	3–3 (a)	
1998	Semi-finals	(Italy) Sampdoria	3–1	0–1	3–2	
1998	Finals	(Poland) Ruch Chorzów	1–0	2–0	3–0	
2002	Third round	(Belarus) BATE Borisov	2–0	0–0	2–0	
2002	Semi-finals	(Czech Republic) Teplice	5–1	3–1	8–2	
2002	Finals	(England) Fulham	2–2	1–3	3–5	

== FIFA-only recognized seasonal competitions ==
=== Inter-Cities Fairs Cup ===
Season	Round	Opponent	Home	Away	Aggregate
1966–67	First round	(Turkey) Göztepe	3–1	2–1	5–2
1966–67	Second round	(Czechoslovakia) Sparta Prague	2–1	2–2	4–3
1966–67	Third round	(England) West Bromwich Albion	3–0	3–1	6–1
1966–67	Quarter-finals	(England) Leeds United	1–0	0–1 (a.e.t.)	1–1 (c)
1967–68	First round	(Norway) Lyn	2–0	0–0	2–0
1967–68	Second round	(Socialist Federal Republic of Yugoslavia) Dinamo Zagreb	0–0	2–1	2–1
1967–68	Third round	Given bye			
1967–68	Quarter-finals	(Socialist Federal Republic of Yugoslavia) Vojvodina	0–0	2–0	2–0
1967–68	Semi-finals	(Hungary) Ferencváros	2–2	2–3	4–5
1968–69	First round	(Switzerland) Basel	4–1	2–1	6–2
1968–69	Second round	(Socialist Federal Republic of Yugoslavia) OFK Beograd	1–1	0–1	1–2

== Overall record ==
=== UEFA competitions record ===
Accurate as of 16 April 2026

Competition	Pld	W	D	L	GF	GA	GD	W%
European Cup / UEFA Champions League	10	2	3	5	6	11	−5	20.00
Cup Winners' Cup	4	1	2	1	4	4	+0	25.00
UEFA Cup / UEFA Europa League	42	20	12	10	65	45	+20	47.62
UEFA Intertoto Cup	12	7	2	3	22	12	+10	58.33
Total	68	30	19	19	97	72	+25	44.12

=== By club ===
The following list details Bologna's all-time record against clubs they have met one or more times in European competition. The club and its country are given, as well as the number of matches played (Pld), won by Bologna (W), drawn (D) and lost (L), goals for Bologna (GF), goals against Bologna (GA), Bologna's goal difference (GD), and their win percentages (W%). Statistics are correct as of the 2025–26 season and include goals scored during extra time where applicable; in these games, the result given is the result at the end of extra time.

Accurate as of 16 April 2026

Positive balance (more wins than losses)
Neutral balance (as many wins as losses)
Negative balance (more losses than wins)

Club	Pld	W	D	L	GF	GA	GD	W%
(Austria) Admira Wacker	2	1	0	1	3	3	+0	50.00
(Belgium) Anderlecht	6	3	1	2	9	4	+5	50.00
(England) Aston Villa	4	0	0	4	1	10	−9	0.00
(Belarus) BATE Borisov	2	1	1	0	2	0	+2	50.00
(Switzerland) Basel	2	2	0	0	6	2	+4	100.00
(Portugal) Benfica	1	0	1	0	0	0	+0	0.00
(Germany) Borussia Dortmund	1	1	0	0	2	1	+1	100.00
(Norway) Brann	3	2	1	0	2	0	+2	66.67
(Spain) Celta Vigo	1	1	0	0	2	1	+1	100.00
(Scotland) Celtic	1	0	1	0	2	2	+0	0.00
(Croatia) Dinamo Zagreb	2	1	1	0	2	1	+1	50.00
(Romania) FCSB	1	1	0	0	2	1	+1	100.00
(Hungary) Ferencváros	2	0	1	1	4	5	−1	0.00
(Germany) SC Freiburg	1	0	1	0	1	1	+0	0.00
(England) Fulham	2	0	1	1	3	5	−2	0.00
(Turkey) Galatasaray	2	0	1	1	2	3	−1	0.00
(Turkey) Göztepe	2	2	0	0	5	2	+3	100.00
(Poland) Gwardia Warsaw	2	1	0	1	3	3	+0	50.00
(Scotland) Heart of Midlothian	2	1	0	1	4	3	+1	50.00
(England) Leeds United	2	1	0	1	1	1	+0	50.00
(France) Lille	1	0	0	1	1	2	−1	0.00
(England) Liverpool	1	0	0	1	0	2	−2	0.00
(Norway) Lyn	2	1	1	0	2	0	+2	50.00
(France) Lyon	2	1	0	1	3	2	+1	50.00
(Israel) Maccabi Tel Aviv	1	1	0	0	3	0	+3	100.00
(France) Marseille	2	0	2	0	1	1	+0	0.00
(France) Monaco	1	0	0	1	0	1	−1	0.00
(Serbia) OFK Beograd	2	0	1	1	1	2	−1	0.00
(Romania) Progresul București	2	1	0	1	3	3	+0	50.00
(Spain) Real Betis	2	1	0	1	4	2	+2	50.00
(Austria) Red Bull Salzburg	1	1	0	0	4	1	+3	100.00
(Italy) Roma	2	1	1	0	5	4	+1	50.00
(Poland) Ruch Chorzów	2	2	0	0	3	0	+3	100.00
(Italy) Sampdoria	2	1	0	1	3	2	+1	50.00
(Ukraine) Shakhtar Donetsk	1	0	1	0	0	0	+0	0.00
(Czech Republic) Slavia Prague	2	2	0	0	4	1	+3	100.00
(Czech Republic) Sparta Prague	2	1	1	0	4	3	+1	50.00
(Portugal) Sporting CP	5	2	2	1	6	5	+1	40.00
(Czech Republic) Teplice	2	2	0	0	8	2	+6	100.00
(Serbia) Vojvodina	2	1	1	0	2	0	+2	50.00
(Germany) Vorwärts Berlin	2	0	2	0	1	1	+0	0.00
(England) West Bromwich Albion	2	2	0	0	6	1	+5	100.00
(Poland) Zagłębie Lubin	2	2	0	0	2	0	+2	100.00
(Bosnia and Herzegovina) Željezničar	2	0	2	0	3	3	+0	0.00
(Russia) Zenit Saint Petersburg	2	1	1	0	5	2	+3	50.00

Source: UEFA.com
Pld = Matches played; W = Matches won; D = Matches drawn; L = Matches lost; GF = Goals for; GA = Goals against; GD = Goal difference.
