= Bertus Caldenhove =

Dutch footballer (1914–1983)

Bep Caldenhove
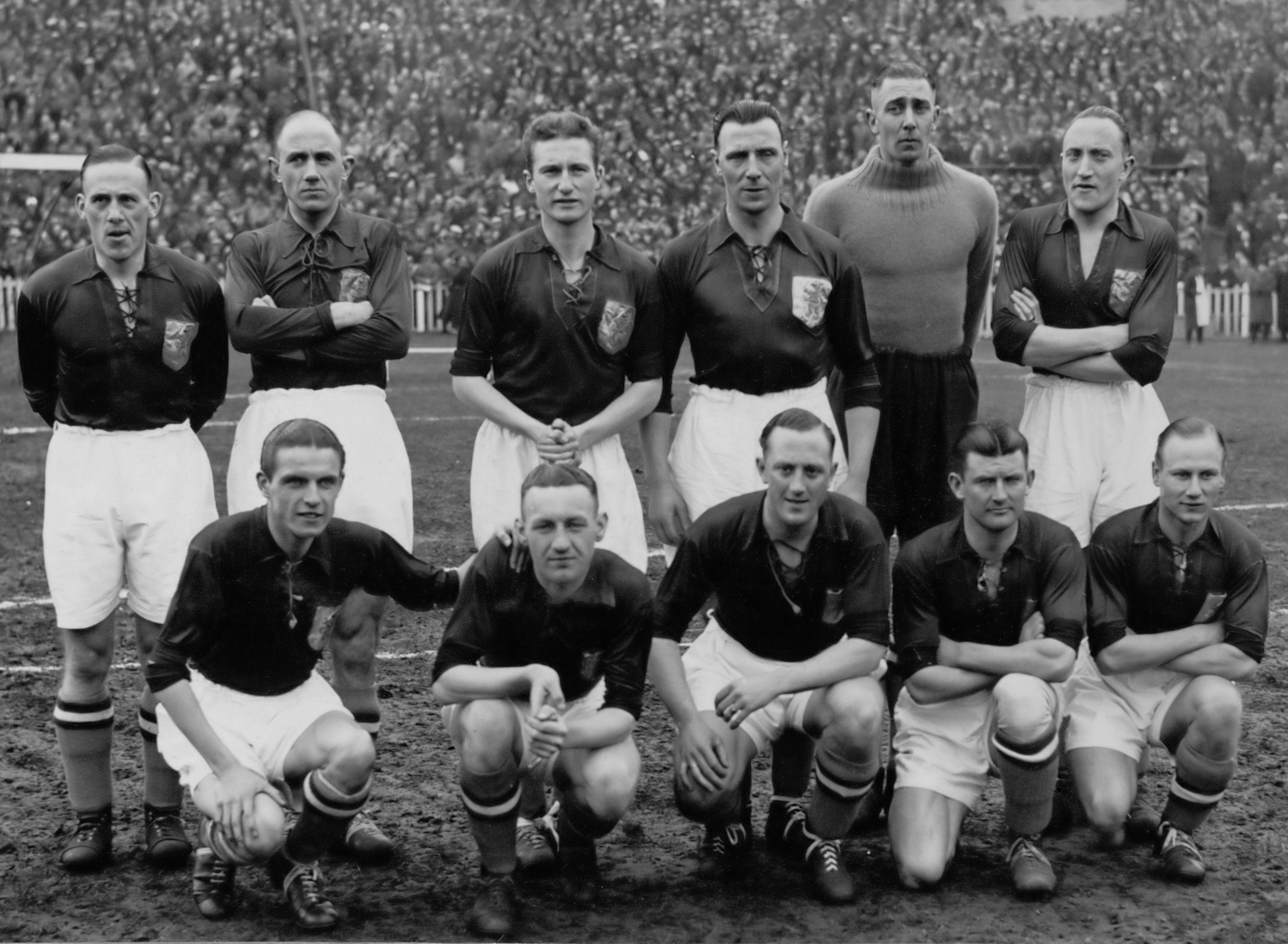
- The Dutch national team (1938): Caldenhove standing, 2nd from the left.

Personal information
- Date of birth: 19 January 1914
- Place of birth: Amsterdam, Netherlands
- Date of death: 30 July 1983 (aged 69)
- Position: Defender

Youth career
- SDZ

Senior career*
| Years | Team | Apps | (Gls) |
| 1931–1940 | DWS | | |

International career
| 1935–1940 | Netherlands | 25 | (0) |
- * Club domestic league appearances and goals

Bernardus Joannes Caldenhove (19 January 1914 – 30 July 1983) was a Dutch football defender who played for the Netherlands in the 1938 FIFA World Cup.

== Club career ==
He started playing football for SDZ then joined DWS, where he was made captain when 18 years old.

== International career ==
Caldenhove made his debut for the Netherlands in a March 1935 friendly match against Belgium and earned a total of 25 caps, scoring no goals. His final international was also against Belgium, in March 1940.
