= Bram Wiertz =

Dutch association football player

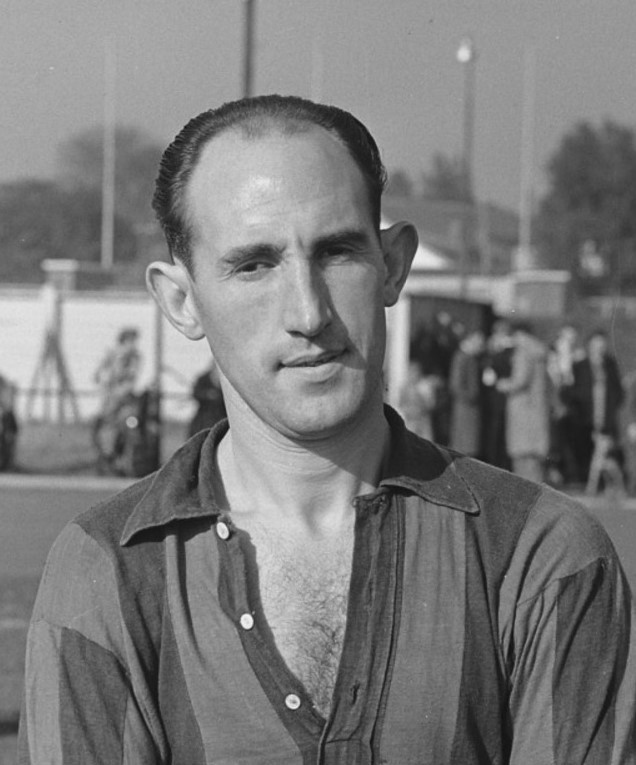
- Wiertz in 1951

Personal information
- Full name: Abraham Wiertz
- Date of birth: 21 November 1919
- Place of birth: Amsterdam, Netherlands
- Date of death: 20 October 2013 (aged 93)
- Position: Midfielder

Senior career*
Years	Team	Apps	(Gls)
1937–1957	DWS		

International career^{‡}
1951–1952	Netherlands	8	(0)
- * Club domestic league appearances and goals ‡ National team caps and goals as of 4 July 2016

Bram Wiertz (21 November 1919 – 20 October 2013) was a Dutch footballer who competed in the 1952 Summer Olympics. At the time of his death aged 93, Wiertz was the oldest living Dutch international footballer.
