= Ivan Deyanov =

Bulgarian footballer (1937–2018)

Personal information
- Date of birth: 16 December 1937
- Place of birth: Sofia, Bulgaria
- Date of death: 26 September 2018 (aged 80)
- Position: Goalkeeper

Youth career
- Cherveno Zname Sofia

Senior career*
Years	Team	Apps	(Gls)
1955–1956	Cherveno Zname Sofia		
1957–1963	Minyor Dimitrovgrad		
1963–1969	Lokomotiv Sofia	122	(0)

International career
1964–1966	Bulgaria	10	(0)

Managerial career
- 1971–1976: Lokomotiv Sofia (youth team)
- 1977: Al-Yarmouk
- 1977–1978: Al-Ahly Benghazi
- * Club domestic league appearances and goals

Ivan Deyanov (Bulgarian: Иван Деянов; 16 December 1937 – 26 September 2018) was a Bulgarian footballer who played as a goalkeeper, later manager. He played for Bulgaria in the 1966 FIFA World Cup. He also played for Lokomotiv Sofia.

== Honours ==
Lokomotiv Sofia

- Bulgarian League: 1963–64
