= 1963–64 A Group =

20th season of top-tier football league in Bulgaria

A Group
- Season: 1963–64
- Champions: Lokomotiv Sofia (3rd title)
- Relegated: Spartak Varna; Lokomotiv GO
- European Cup: Lokomotiv Sofia
- Inter-Cities Fairs Cup: Lokomotiv Plovdiv
- Matches played: 240
- Goals scored: 612 (2.55 per match)
- Top goalscorer: Nikola Tsanev (26 goals)

The 1963–64 A Group was the 16th season of the A Football Group, the top Bulgarian professional league for association football clubs, since its establishment in 1948.

== Overview ==
It was contested by 16 teams, and Lokomotiv Sofia won the championship.

== League standings ==
| Pos | Team | Pld | W | D | L | GF | GA | GD | Pts | Qualification or relegation |
|---|---|---|---|---|---|---|---|---|---|---|
| 1 | Lokomotiv Sofia (C) | 30 | 18 | 8 | 4 | 53 | 28 | +25 | 44 | Qualification for European Cup preliminary round |
| 2 | Levski Sofia | 30 | 16 | 9 | 5 | 53 | 32 | +21 | 41 | |
| 3 | Slavia Sofia | 30 | 13 | 9 | 8 | 46 | 36 | +10 | 35 | Qualification for Cup Winners' Cup first round |
| 4 | Spartak Plovdiv | 30 | 13 | 8 | 9 | 42 | 34 | +8 | 34 | |
| 5 | Dunav Ruse | 30 | 12 | 8 | 10 | 31 | 35 | −4 | 32 | |
| 6 | Cherno More Varna | 30 | 11 | 9 | 10 | 35 | 30 | +5 | 31 | |
| 7 | Botev Plovdiv | 30 | 13 | 4 | 13 | 43 | 54 | −11 | 30 | |
| 8 | Lokomotiv Plovdiv | 30 | 10 | 9 | 11 | 33 | 38 | −5 | 29 | Invitation for Inter-Cities Fairs Cup first round |
| 9 | Marek Dupnitsa | 30 | 11 | 6 | 13 | 39 | 32 | +7 | 28 | |
| 10 | Spartak Pleven | 30 | 9 | 10 | 11 | 31 | 33 | −2 | 28 | |
| 11 | CSKA Sofia | 30 | 12 | 3 | 15 | 58 | 40 | +18 | 27 | |
| 12 | Spartak Sofia | 30 | 8 | 9 | 13 | 28 | 40 | −12 | 25 | |
| 13 | Sliven | 30 | 8 | 9 | 13 | 29 | 41 | −12 | 25 | |
| 14 | Beroe Stara Zagora | 30 | 8 | 8 | 14 | 28 | 38 | −10 | 24 | |
| 15 | Spartak Varna (R) | 30 | 9 | 6 | 15 | 34 | 52 | −18 | 24 | Relegation to 1964–65 B Group |
| 16 | Lokomotiv GO (R) | 30 | 9 | 5 | 16 | 29 | 49 | −20 | 23 | Relegation to 1964–65 B Group |

Source: rsssf.com
(C) Champions; (R) Relegated

== Results ==
| Home \ Away | BSZ | BPD | CHM | CSK | DUN | LEV | LGO | LPL | LSO | MAR | SLA | SLI | SPL | SPD | SSF | SPV |
|---|---|---|---|---|---|---|---|---|---|---|---|---|---|---|---|---|
| Beroe Stara Zagora | | 1–2 | 0–1 | 5–4 | 0–0 | 1–0 | 1–0 | 1–2 | 4–0 | 2–0 | 0–0 | 0–1 | 2–3 | 0–1 | 1–0 | 0–1 |
| Botev Plovdiv | 0–0 | | 1–0 | 2–0 | 2–0 | 1–0 | 2–1 | 3–2 | 0–0 | 3–1 | 3–1 | 1–2 | 1–0 | 2–2 | 5–1 | 4–2 |
| Cherno More | 2–0 | 3–1 | | 0–0 | 0–2 | 3–2 | 3–0 | 1–1 | 0–1 | 1–1 | 0–1 | 1–0 | 2–1 | 1–0 | 3–0 | 2–0 |
| CSKA Sofia | 4–0 | 4–0 | 2–0 | | 3–0 | 1–2 | 4–0 | 3–1 | 1–1 | 2–3 | 2–3 | 7–0 | 4–0 | 1–0 | 4–1 | 4–2 |
| Dunav Ruse | 0–0 | 3–2 | 2–2 | 1–0 | | 0–0 | 3–1 | 1–0 | 0–1 | 2–0 | 2–1 | 2–1 | 0–0 | 1–0 | 2–0 | 1–0 |
| Levski Sofia | 4–2 | 3–1 | 1–0 | 2–1 | 3–2 | | 0–0 | 5–2 | 1–1 | 3–0 | 4–3 | 4–2 | 1–1 | 2–2 | 0–0 | 2–0 |
| Lokomotiv GO | 0–1 | 5–2 | 1–1 | 1–0 | 0–0 | 1–2 | | 3–2 | 2–1 | 1–0 | 2–1 | 1–0 | 2–1 | 1–1 | 0–0 | 1–0 |
| Lokomotiv Plovdiv | 0–0 | 1–0 | 1–0 | 3–1 | 2–1 | 1–2 | 2–1 | | 1–2 | 1–0 | 0–1 | 0–0 | 0–0 | 2–2 | 2–1 | 2–1 |
| Lokomotiv Sofia | 2–2 | 4–0 | 4–2 | 3–2 | 5–2 | 1–3 | 2–0 | 1–1 | | 2–0 | 1–1 | 5–3 | 2–0 | 3–1 | 2–0 | 5–1 |
| Marek Dupnitsa | 0–1 | 5–0 | 2–1 | 1–0 | 0–0 | 1–1 | 5–1 | 1–0 | 0–1 | | 3–1 | 3–1 | 1–0 | 0–1 | 4–2 | 6–0 |
| Slavia Sofia | 2–1 | 0–1 | 1–1 | 3–1 | 0–1 | 2–2 | 4–1 | 2–2 | 1–0 | 0–0 | | 2–0 | 0–0 | 4–2 | 4–2 | 3–1 |
| Sliven | 2–1 | 1–1 | 0–0 | 3–1 | 3–0 | 0–0 | 2–0 | 0–0 | 0–1 | 1–1 | 0–2 | | 2–0 | 1–1 | 3–1 | 0–0 |
| Spartak Pleven | 2–0 | 6–0 | 3–1 | 1–0 | 1–1 | 0–0 | 2–1 | 1–0 | 0–0 | 2–1 | 0–0 | 2–2 | | 1–0 | 0–1 | 1–2 |
| Spartak Plovdiv | 4–1 | 2–1 | 0–0 | 0–1 | 4–1 | 1–0 | 2–1 | 0–2 | 0–0 | 1–0 | 3–1 | 2–0 | 3–1 | | 2–2 | 2–1 |
| Spartak Sofia | 0–0 | 1–0 | 1–3 | 0–0 | 2–0 | 1–2 | 2–0 | 0–0 | 0–1 | 0–0 | 0–1 | 1–0 | 2–0 | 3–2 | | 4–1 |
| Spartak Varna | 1–1 | 3–2 | 1–1 | 2–1 | 2–1 | 1–0 | 1–1 | 4–0 | 0–1 | 1–0 | 1–1 | 1–0 | 2–2 | 0–1 | 1–1 | |

Source: A PFG (in Bulgarian)
Legend: Blue = home team win; Yellow = draw; Red = away team win.

== Champions ==
Lokomotiv Sofia

Goalkeepers
| (Bulgaria) Ivan Deyanov | 25 | (0) |
| (Bulgaria) Tsvetan Lalov | 8 | (0) |

Defenders
| (Bulgaria) Todor Velev | 13 | (0) |
| (Bulgaria) Ivan Dimitrov | 28 | (0) |
| (Bulgaria) Vasil Metodiev | 28 | (0) |
| (Bulgaria) Dimitar Penev | 28 | (1) |
| (Bulgaria) Mladen Penev | 8 | (0) |
| (Bulgaria) Apostol Chachevski | 25 | (2) |

Midfielders
| (Bulgaria) Ivan Kotsev | 28 | (1) |
| (Bulgaria) Dimitar Dragomirov | 7 | (1) |
| (Bulgaria) Hristo Lazarov | 19 | (1) |
| (Bulgaria) Botyo Botev | 10 | (2) |
| (Bulgaria) Viktor Andonov | 14 | (0) |
| (Bulgaria) Dimitar Milushev | 1 | (0) |
| (Bulgaria) Georgi Panov | 3 | (0) |
| (Bulgaria) Vasil Vasilev | 26 | (7) |

Forwards
| (Bulgaria) Spiro Debarski | 29 | (14) |
| (Bulgaria) Nikola Kotkov | 28 | (14) |
| (Bulgaria) Tsvetan Milev | 30 | (9) |
| (Bulgaria) Georgi Manolov | 4 | (1) |

Manager
| (Bulgaria) Georgi Berkov |

== Top scorers ==
| Rank | Scorer | Club | Goals |
|---|---|---|---|
| 1 | (Bulgaria) Nikola Tsanev | CSKA Sofia | 26 |
| 2 | (Bulgaria) Traycho Spasov | Marek Dupnitsa | 22 |
| 3 | (Bulgaria) Aleksandar Vasilev | Slavia Sofia | 21 |
