= Marian Kielec =

Polish footballer (1942–2026)

Personal information
- Date of birth: 6 March 1942
- Place of birth: Câmpulung Moldovenesc, Romania
- Date of death: 13 March 2026 (aged 84)
- Position: Forward

Senior career*
Years	Team	Apps	(Gls)
1959–1971	Pogoń Szczecin		(113)
1979	Pogoń Szczecin		

International career
1962	Poland	1	(0)

Managerial career
- Polonia Hamilton
- * Club domestic league appearances and goals

Marian Kielec (6 March 1942 – 13 March 2026) was a Polish footballer who played as a forward. He spent his entire career with Pogoń Szczecin, and is the club's leading all-time league goalscorer with 113 goals. He made one appearance for Poland national team in October 1962. Kielec died on 13 March 2026, at the age of 84.

== Honours ==
Individual

- Ekstraklasa top scorer: 1962–63
