= Frits Flinkevleugel =

Dutch footballer (1939–2020)

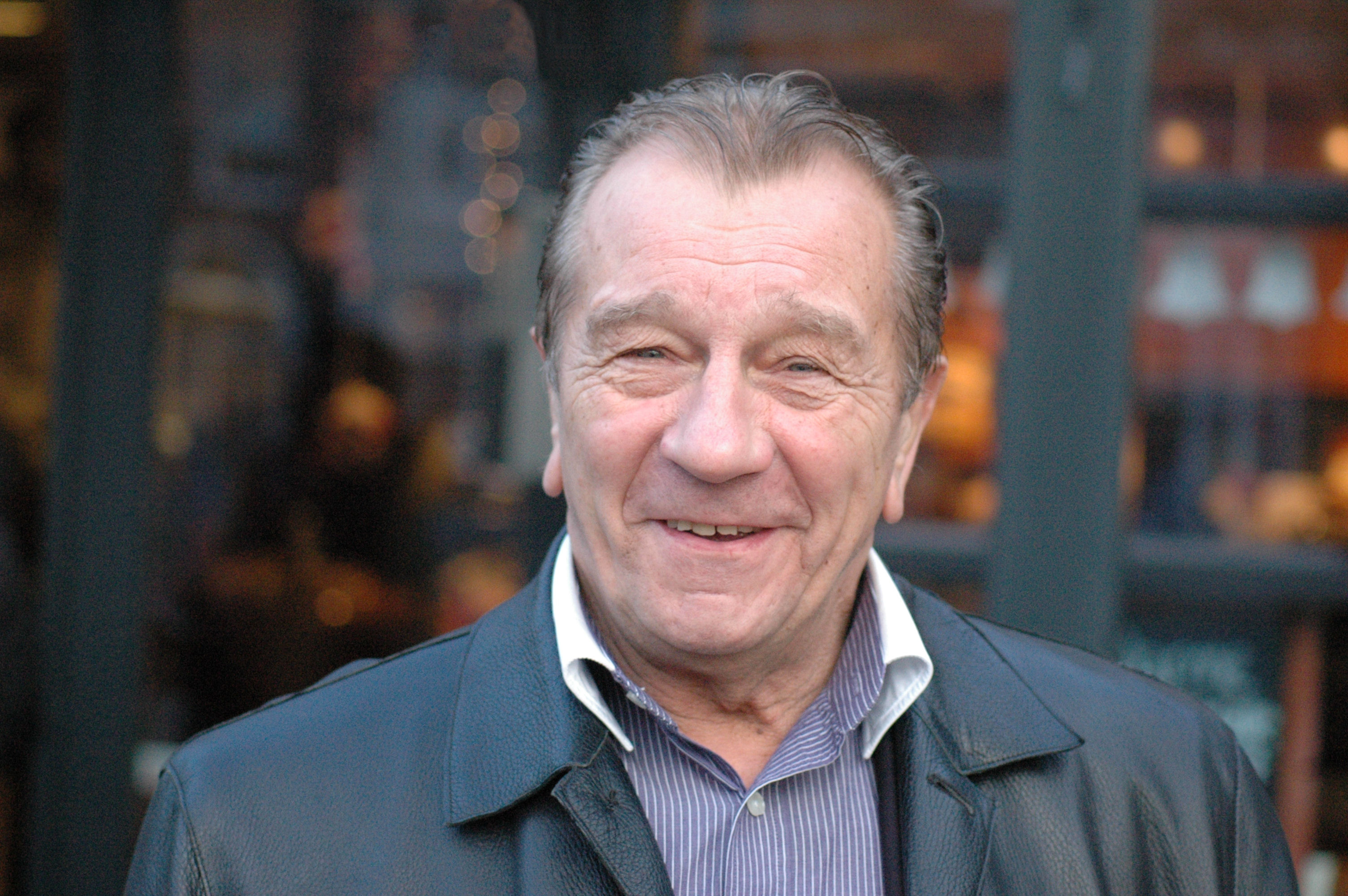
- Flinkevleugel in 2009

Personal information
- Full name: Frederik Arnoldus Flinkevleugel
- Date of birth: 3 November 1939
- Place of birth: Amsterdam, Netherlands
- Date of death: 10 April 2020 (aged 80)
- Height: 1.68 m (5 ft 6 in)
- Position: Right back

Senior career*
Years	Team	Apps	(Gls)
1958–1972	DWS	361	(17)
1972–1977	FC Amsterdam	110	(4)
Total		471	(21)

International career
1964–1967	Netherlands	11	(0)
- * Club domestic league appearances and goals

Frederik Arnoldus "Frits" Flinkevleugel (3 November 1939 – 10 April 2020) was a Dutch footballer who played as a right back.

== Career ==
Born in Amsterdam, Flinkevleugel played for DWS and FC Amsterdam. He won the Dutch championship in 1964 with DWS.

He also earned 11 caps for the Netherlands national team between 1964 and 1967.

== Later life and death ==
Flinkevleugel owned a cigar shop in Amsterdam. He died of COVID-19 on 10 April 2020, aged 80.
