= Antti Nieminen =

Finnish footballer (1928-1972)

Personal information
- Date of birth: 12 March 1928
- Date of death: 24 October 1972 (aged 44)

International career
Years	Team	Apps	(Gls)
1960	Finland	1	(0)

Antti Nieminen (12 March 1928 – 24 October 1972) was a Finnish footballer. He played in one match for the Finland national football team in 1960.
