= Dick Hollander =

Dutch footballer (born 1941)

- Dick Hollander (1964)

Personal information
- Full name: Dirk Hollander
- Date of birth: 28 January 1941 (age 85)
- Place of birth: Amsterdam, the Netherlands
- Position: Outside left

Youth career
- Zeeburgia

Senior career*
Years	Team	Apps	(Gls)
1958–1966	DWS	116	(17)
1966–1969	HVC	62	(6)
Total		178	(23)

International career
1964	Netherlands	1	(0)

Managerial career
- 1973–1976: Zeeburgia
- * Club domestic league appearances and goals

Dirk Hollander (born 28 January 1941) is a Dutch retired footballer who played as a forward for DWS Amsterdam. He made one appearance for the Netherlands national team in 1964.

He won back to back league titles with DWS and ran a tobacco shop in Amsterdam.

Hollander later won promotion to the Eerste Divisie with Amersfoort club HVC.
