= Roman Kasprzyk =

Polish footballer

Personal information
- Date of birth: 4 September 1942 (age 84)
- Place of birth: Oświęcim, Poland
- Height: 1.78 m (5 ft 10 in)
- Position: Forward

Senior career*
| Years | Team | Apps | (Gls) |
| 1961–1965 | Ruch Chorzów | | |
| 1965–1970 | Zagłębie Wałbrzych | | |
| 1970–1971 | Stal Mielec | | |
| 1971–1972 | Star Starachowice | | |
| 1972–1977 | Concordia Knurów | | |

International career
- Poland U18
| 1963 | Poland | 2 | (0) |
Medal record
Men's football
Representing Poland
UEFA European Under-18 Championship
| Runner-up | 1961 Portugal |
- * Club domestic league appearances and goals

Roman Kasprzyk (born 4 September 1942) is a Polish former footballer who played as a forward. He played in two matches for the Poland national football team in 1963.

== Honours ==
Poland U18

- UEFA European Under-18 Championship runner-up: 1961

Individual

- II liga top scorer: 1968
