= Giannis Komianidis =

Greek footballer

Personal information
- Date of birth: 1938
- Date of death: 28 April 2015 (aged 76–77)

International career
Years	Team	Apps	(Gls)
1964–1965	Greece	3	(0)

Giannis Komianidis (1938 – 28 April 2015) was a Greek footballer. He played in three matches for the Greece national football team from 1964 to 1965.
