= Spiro Debarski =

Bulgarian footballer (1933–2026)

Personal information
- Date of birth: 8 December 1933
- Place of birth: Blagoevgrad, Bulgaria
- Date of death: 31 January 2026 (aged 92)
- Height: 1.70 m (5 ft 7 in)
- Position: Forward

Senior career*
Years	Team	Apps	(Gls)
1949–1953	Pirin Blagoevgrad		
1953–1957	Rozova Dolina		
1957–1969	Lokomotiv Sofia	275	(82)

International career
1957–1965	Bulgaria	24	(8)

Managerial career
- 1967–1968: Lokomotiv Sofia (assistant)
- 1973–1976: Lokomotiv Sofia (assistant)
- 1977–1980: Nea Salamis
- 1984–1985: Yantra Gabrovo
- * Club domestic league appearances and goals

Spiro Debarski (Bulgarian: Спиро Николов Дебърски; 8 December 1933 – 31 January 2026) was a Bulgarian footballer who played as a forward. He competed in the 1960 Summer Olympics. Debarski died on 31 January 2026, at the age of 92.

== Honours ==
Lokomotiv Sofia

- A Group: 1963–64
