= Joop Burgers =

Dutch footballer (born 1940)

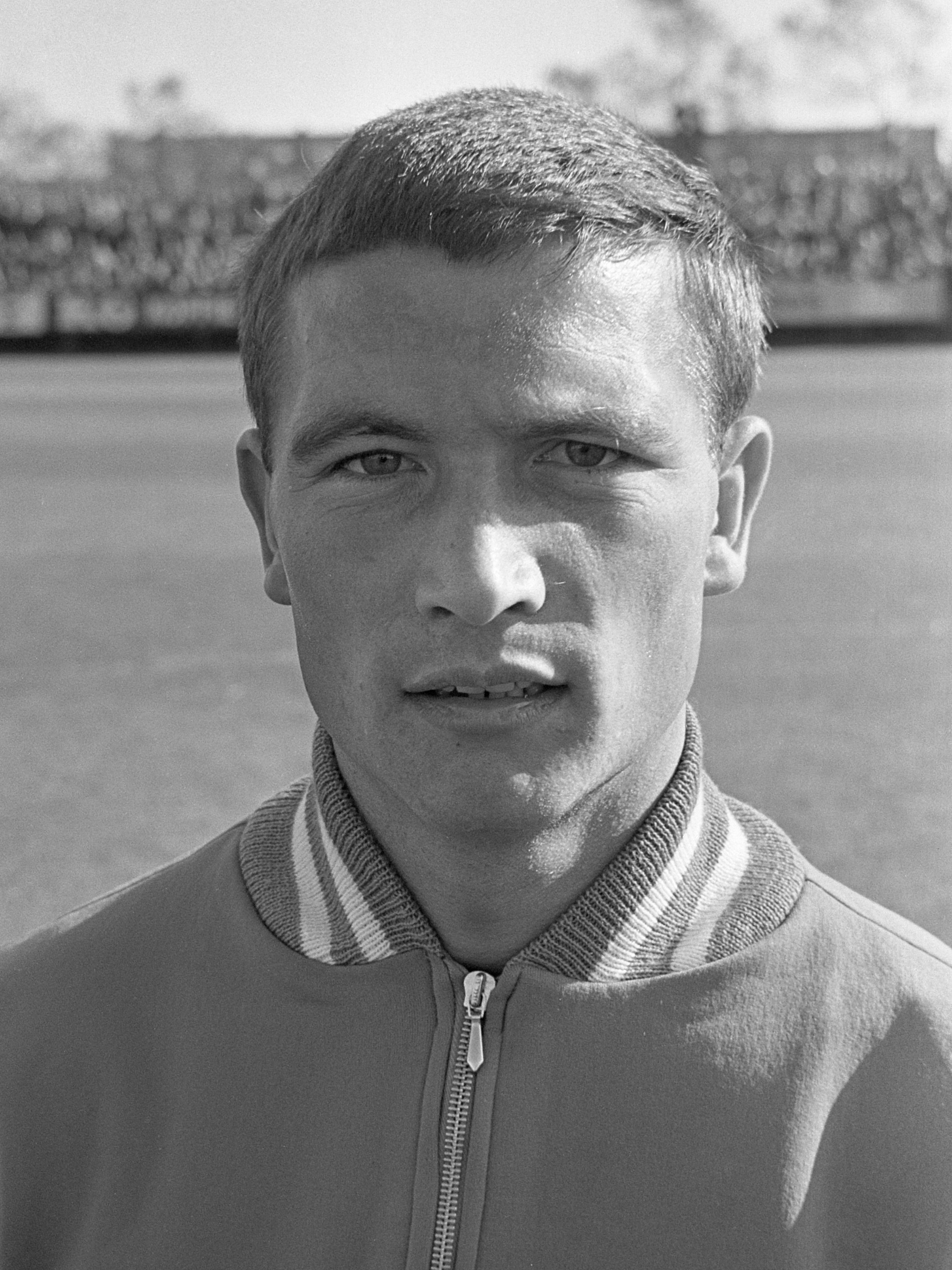
- Burgers in 1965

Personal information
- Full name: Johannes Theodorus Burgers
- Date of birth: 25 April 1940 (age 86)
- Place of birth: Amsterdam, Netherlands
- Position: Midfielder

Senior career*
Years	Team	Apps	(Gls)
1960–1969	DWS	127	(7)
1969–1973	Haarlem	101	(7)
Total		228	(14)

International career
1965	Netherlands	1	(0)
- * Club domestic league appearances and goals

Joop Burgers (born 25 April 1940) is a Dutch footballer. He played in one match for the Netherlands national football team in 1965.

He played for DWS and Haarlem. Later he managed amateur sides OSV (from 1993 to 1997) and De Volewijckers.
