= Johann Geyer =

Austrian footballer (born 1942)

Personal information
- Date of birth: 12 August 1942 (age 84)
- Place of birth: St. Pölten, Austria
- Position: Midfielder

Senior career*
Years	Team	Apps	(Gls)
1961–1967	Austria Wien	105	(12)
1967–1968	Grazer AK	23	(2)
1968–1972	Austria Wien	108	(5)
Total		236	(19)

International career
1962–1971	Austria	9	(0)
- * Club domestic league appearances and goals

Johann Geyer (born 12 August 1942) is an Austrian former footballer who played as a midfielder for Austria Wien and Grazer AK. He made nine appearances for the Austria national team from 1962 to 1971.
