= Bert Theunissen =

Dutch footballer and manager

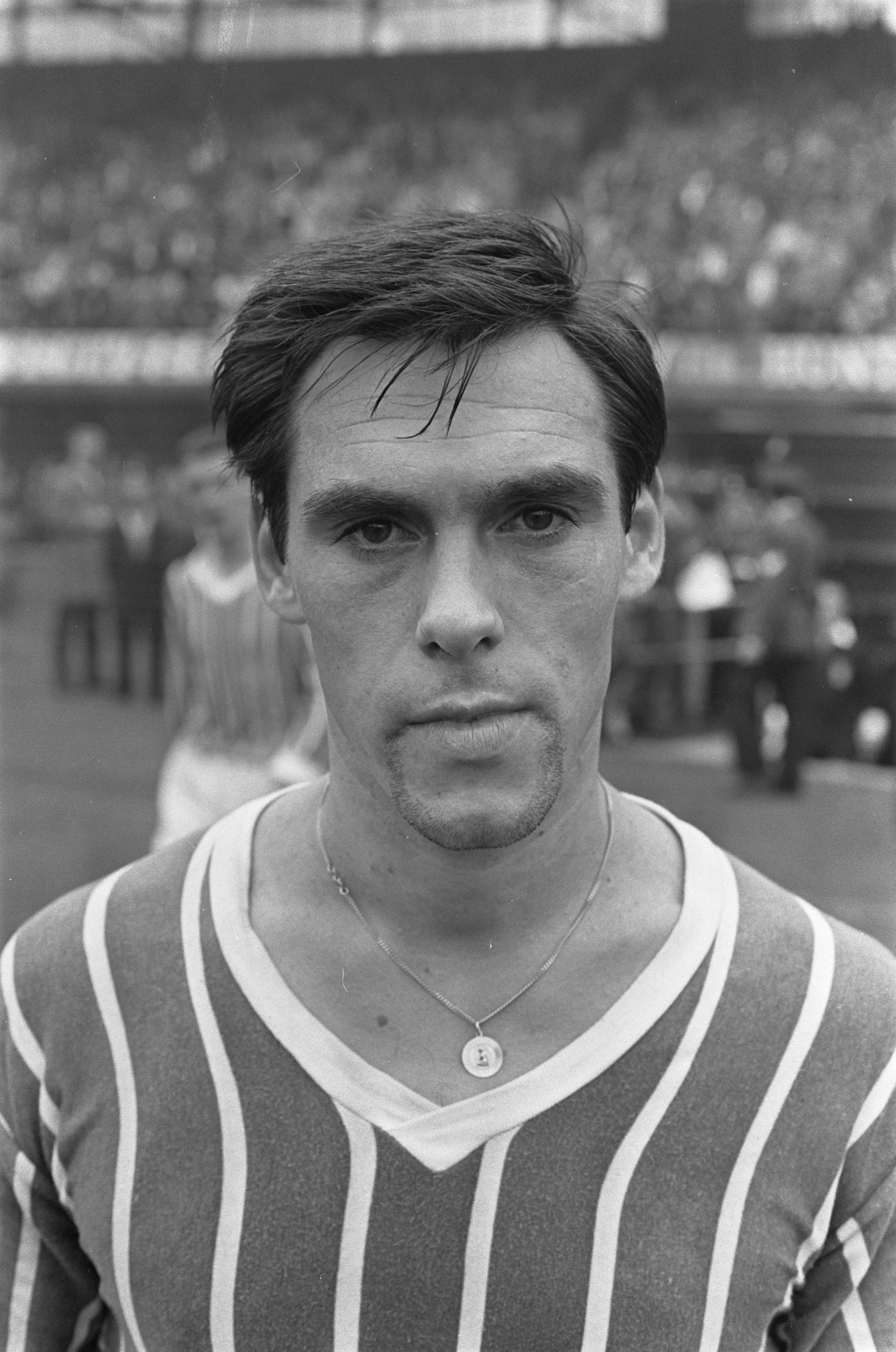

Personal information
- Full name: Lambertus Ignatius Theunissen
- Date of birth: 31 August 1939 (age 87)
- Position: Midfielder

Senior career*
Years	Team	Apps	(Gls)
1956–1960	Vitesse		
1960–1962	Utrecht		
1962–1963	Heracles		
1963–1964	PSV		
1965–1967	Young Boys		
1967–1968	Fortuna Sittard		
1968–1970	Telstar		
1970–1974	Young Boys		

Managerial career
- 1974–1978: FC Bern
- 1978–1980: FC Winterthur
- 1980–1983: Young Boys
- 1983–1984: Apollon Athens
- 1984–1985: FC Grenchen
- 1986–1987: FC Martigny-Sports
- 1987–1988: FC Baden
- * Club domestic league appearances and goals

Bert Theunissen (born 31 August 1939) is a Dutch retired football midfielder and later manager.
