= László Povázsai =

Hungarian footballer (1937–2010)

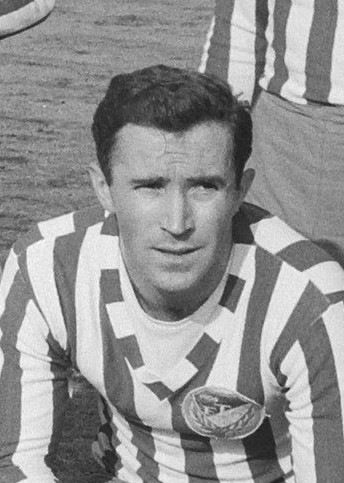
- Shown in 1965

Personal information
- Date of birth: 10 November 1937
- Place of birth: Bucharest, Romania
- Date of death: 21 October 2010 (aged 72)
- Position: Forward

Senior career*
Years	Team	Apps	(Gls)
1955-1960	Csepel SC	?	(31)
1960-1962	MTK	12	(9)
1962-1966	Győri ETO	82	(33)
1967–1970	BKV Előre		

International career
1955–1956	Hungary U19	10	(8)
1963-1964	Hungary Olympic	5	(2)

Managerial career
- 1976-1977: Bp. Spartacus
- * Club domestic league appearances and goals

László Povázsai (10 November 1937 – 21 October 2010) was a Hungarian footballer who played as a forward.

== Career ==
He was born in Bucharest, Romania but he moved to Hungary with his family as teenager. His first club in the Hungarian league was Csepel SC where he stayed from 1955 until 1960, winning the 1959 Hungarian title. Povázsai László then signed for MTK playing in the Inter-Cities Fairs Cup. His last club was BKV Előre where he finished his career in 1970.
After retiring from football he coached Bp.Spartacus in the 1976–1977 season.
