= Piet Spel =

Dutch footballer

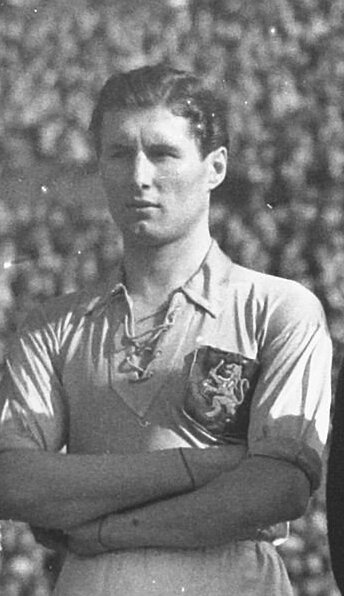
- Spel (1948)

Personal information
- Date of birth: 18 April 1924
- Date of death: 9 March 2007 (aged 82)

International career
Years	Team	Apps	(Gls)
1948	Netherlands	1	(0)

Piet Spel (18 April 1924 – 9 March 2007) was a Dutch footballer. He played in one match for the Netherlands national football team in 1948.
