= Piet Giesen =

Dutch footballer (born 1945)

Personal information
- Full name: Peter Giesen
- Date of birth: 12 August 1945 (age 81)
- Place of birth: Kerkrade, Netherlands
- Position: Midfielder

Senior career*
Years	Team	Apps	(Gls)
1961–1962	Roda Sport	27	(6)
1962–1967	PSV	89	(19)
1967–1968	Fortuna '54	31	(6)
1968–1969	ADO Den Haag	28	(5)
1969–1971	AS Oostende		
Total		176	(36)

International career
1962–1963	Netherlands U19	9	(9)
1963	Netherlands	1	(0)
- * Club domestic league appearances and goals

Peter Giesen (born 12 August 1945) is a Dutch retired footballer who played as a midfielder. He made one appearance for the Netherlands national team in 1963.

== Career ==
During his time at PSV, Giesen, from Bunde, Limburg, set a club record for the numbers of appearances made before his 18th birthday with 30 appearances. In February 2020, 57 years later, Mohamed Ihattaren broke the record making 31 appearances.

Giesen was forced to end his career in his mid-20s due to injuries.
