= 1962–63 Irish League =

Irish League
- Season: 1962–63
- Champions: Distillery; 6th Irish title
- Matches played: 132
- Goals scored: 467 (3.54 per match)
- Top goalscorer: Joe Meldrum (27 goals)

Location of teams in the Irish League from 1949–1972
Location of Belfast-based teams in the Irish League from 1949–1971

The 1962–63 Irish League was the 62nd edition of the Irish League, the highest level of league competition in Northern Irish football. The league consisted of 12 teams, and Distillery won the championship.

== League standings ==
Pos	Team	Pld	W	D	L	GF	GA	GR	Pts	Qualification
1	Distillery (C)	22	13	5	4	57	30	1.900	31	Qualification for the European Cup preliminary round
2	Linfield	22	10	9	3	40	24	1.667	29	Qualification for the European Cup Winners' Cup first round
3	Portadown	22	9	10	3	45	25	1.800	28	
4	Glentoran	22	11	6	5	49	27	1.815	28	Participated in the Inter-Cities Fairs Cup
5	Ballymena United	22	7	11	4	41	42	0.976	25	
6	Crusaders	22	11	2	9	47	42	1.119	24	
7	Coleraine	22	8	8	6	34	33	1.030	24	
8	Glenavon	22	9	5	8	44	31	1.419	23	
9	Derry City	22	8	5	9	34	38	0.895	21	
10	Ards	22	5	3	14	30	54	0.556	13	
11	Cliftonville	22	2	5	15	24	56	0.429	9	
12	Bangor	22	2	5	15	22	65	0.338	9	

Source: rsssf.com
(C) Champions

== Results ==
Home \ Away	ARD	BAN	BLM	CLI	COL	CRU	DIS	DER	GLV	GLT	LIN	POR
Ards		3–0	2–2	1–4	1–2	1–2	2–3	1–5	1–0	1–6	1–0	0–0
Bangor	1–3		2–2	2–1	3–1	0–3	1–3	1–2	0–3	0–5	2–5	2–2
Ballymena United	0–0	4–2		5–1	2–2	2–1	3–1	5–2	1–1	4–3	1–1	2–2
Cliftonville	3–4	3–1	0–1		0–3	1–5	0–3	1–2	0–0	0–3	0–2	0–4
Coleraine	1–2	0–0	3–0	2–2		3–2	2–1	2–2	0–0	2–1	0–3	0–1
Crusaders	4–1	4–0	4–1	3–2	3–2		0–3	4–0	4–3	1–4	0–3	0–1
Distillery	5–3	9–1	6–1	4–1	0–0	1–0		3–1	1–2	1–1	4–2	2–2
Derry City	3–2	2–0	1–1	1–1	1–2	1–1	0–1		1–0	0–1	1–1	3–1
Glenavon	2–0	6–1	1–1	6–2	3–3	2–3	0–2	4–1		0–1	3–2	3–0
Glentoran	2–1	2–2	5–1	1–1	2–3	1–1	5–1	0–2	2–1		1–1	1–3
Linfield	3–1	1–0	1–1	2–0	0–0	2–0	2–2	3–2	2–3	1–1		2–2
Portadown	5–0	1–1	1–1	1–1	4–1	8–2	1–1	3–1	3–1	0–1	0–0	

Source: Irish League Archive
Legend: Blue = home team win; Yellow = draw; Red = away team win.
