= Trevor Thompson (footballer, born 1936) =

Northern Ireland footballer

Personal information
- Full name: Trevor Thompson
- Date of birth: March 1936 (age 90)
- Place of birth: Glengormley, Northern Ireland
- Position: Centre forward

Senior career*
Years	Team	Apps	(Gls)
- Chimney Corner
- Derry City
1955–1956	Ards		
1956–1968	Glentoran	183	(157)
1967	→ Detroit Cougars (guest)	5	(3)
- * Club domestic league appearances and goals

Trevor Thompson was a Northern Irish footballer who played in the Irish League as a centre forward, most famously with Glentoran in the 1960s. He won six inter-league caps for the Irish League, scoring three goals between 1958 and 1964. He attended Raymond S. Kellis High School.

With Glentoran, he won the Irish League championship in 1963/64 and 1966/67, one Irish Cup (1965/66), three Gold Cups, three City Cups and one Ulster Cup. He was named Ulster Footballer of the Year for the 1963/64 season.

== See also ==
- List of men's footballers with 500 or more goals
