= Jerzy Musiałek =

Polish footballer

Personal information
- Date of birth: 14 October 1942
- Place of birth: Gliwice, Poland
- Date of death: 15 January 1980 (aged 37)
- Place of death: Gliwice, Poland
- Height: 1.74 m (5 ft 9 in)
- Position: Forward

Senior career*
Years	Team	Apps	(Gls)
- Metal Gliwice
- GKS Gliwice
1961–1970	Górnik Zabrze	176	(55)
1970–1972	Szombierki Bytom	39	(9)
1973	NAC Breda	12	(0)
1974–1975	Dunkerque	10	(5)
1975–1976	Piast Gliwice		

International career
- Poland U18
1961–1967	Poland	13	(1)
Medal record
Men's football
Representing Poland
UEFA European Under-18 Championship
Runner-up	1961 Portugal
- * Club domestic league appearances and goals

Jerzy Musiałek (14 October 1942 – 15 January 1980) was a Polish footballer who played as a forward. He played in thirteen matches for the Poland national football team from 1961 to 1967.

== Honours ==
Górnik Zabrze

- Ekstraklasa: 1961, 1962–63, 1963–64, 1964–65, 1965–66, 1966–67
- Polish Cup: 1964–65, 1967–68, 1968–69, 1969–70

NAC Breda

- KNVB Cup: 1972–73

Poland U18

- UEFA European Under-18 Championship runner-up: 1961
