= 1967 Intertoto Cup =

Tournament details
- Teams: 48

Tournament statistics
- Matches played: 144

The 1967 Intertoto Cup was the first in which no knock-out rounds were contested, and therefore the first in which no winner was declared. The tournament was expanded, with 48 clubs and twelve groups compared to 40 clubs and ten groups the season before. Denmark participated for the first time.

Ruch Chorzów were the best performers, with 12 points.

== Abandonment of knock-out rounds ==
The Group Stage was always played during the summer break, with the knock-out rounds played as clubs could fit them in during the new season. However, this began to cause increasing problems. Firstly, clubs often had difficulty agreeing dates, and the tournament struggled to finish on time - for example, the 1964–65 final wasn't played until early June, over a year after the group games had started; and in 1963–64 and 1965–66 it was concluded in late May.

The second reason was the insistence of UEFA that any clubs taking part in the European Cup or UEFA Cup Winners' Cup could not continue games in other European competitions after the end of the summer break. This meant that clubs who had progressed from the Intertoto Group Stage, but were also competing in one of the UEFA competitions, had to be given byes through the Intertoto knock-out rounds (until they were eliminated from the UEFA competition), or withdrawn entirely. This made the knock-out rounds complicated, difficult to schedule, and weakened their significance.

The third reason was the lack of value attributed to the knock-out rounds. While reaching the final was seen as an achievement worthy of praise, the main purpose of the tournament, for most clubs who entered, was to provide football during the otherwise empty summer break. The financial benefits of participating in the pools competitions was also important. Having to arrange and play home-and-away knock-out matches during the new season was seen as difficult, expensive, and relatively pointless if the club in question was eliminated before reaching the Final or Semi-finals.

As a result, the knock-out rounds were abandoned, and for the next three decades there were no winners of the cup. The Group Stage continued much as before, with prize money still awarded according to a club's final group placing.

== Group stage ==
The teams were divided into twelve groups of four clubs each - four in 'A' section, and eight in 'B' section. Belgium, France, and the Netherlands had clubs in 'A'; while Austria, Czechoslovakia, Denmark, East Germany, Poland, Sweden and West Germany had clubs in 'B'. Clubs from Switzerland were placed in both sections.

=== Group A1 ===
Pos	Team	Pld	W	D	L	GF	GA	GD	Pts	LUG	BOR	SPA	WAR
1	(Switzerland) Lugano	6	3	1	2	8	5	+3	7	—	0–0	2–0	2–1
2	(France) Bordeaux	6	3	1	2	5	7	−2	7	2–1	—	1–4	0–2
3	(Netherlands) Sparta Rotterdam	6	3	0	3	9	6	+3	6	1–0	0–1	—	4–0
4	(Belgium) Waregem	6	2	0	4	6	10	−4	4	1–3	0–1	2–0	—

Source: mogiel.net
Rules for classification: 1) Points; 2) Goal difference; 3) Goals scored; 4) Head-to-head points; 5) Away goals scored; 6) Draw.
3 June 1967

Sparta Rotterdam (Netherlands)	4-0	(Belgium) Waregem
Henk Bosveld 6'; Ben Bosma 22'; Ad Vermolen 30', 54'

Het Kasteel, Rotterdam
Attendance: 7,000
Referee: (Germany) Willi Thier

11 June 1967

Waregem (Belgium)	2-0	(Netherlands) Sparta Rotterdam
Pierre Vandevelde 49'; Jószef Frivaldi 74' (pen.)

Regenboogstadion, Waregem
Attendance: 4,000
Referee: (Switzerland) Eugen Boller

17 June 1967

Sparta Rotterdam (Netherlands)	0-1	(France) Bordeaux
		Gabriel Abossolo 22'

Het Kasteel, Rotterdam
Attendance: 8,000
Referee: (Belgium) Franz Geluck

24 June 1967

Lugano (Switzerland)	2-0	(Netherlands) Sparta Rotterdam
Flavio Signorelli 34'; Otto Luttrop 78'

Cornaredo Stadium, Lugano
Attendance: 4,000
Referee: (France) René Vigliani

1 July 1967

Bordeaux (France)	1-4	(Netherlands) Sparta Rotterdam
Karounga Keïta 55'		Ad Vermolen 10'; Henk Bosveld 20', 83'; Ole Madsen 41'

Stade du Parc Lescure, Bordeaux
Attendance: 2,000
Referee: (Belgium) Vital Loraux

8 July 1967

Sparta Rotterdam (Netherlands)	1-0	(Switzerland) Lugano
		Henk Bosveld 3'

Het Kasteel, Rotterdam
Attendance: 4,000
Referee: (Germany) Alfred Ott

=== Group A2 ===
Pos	Team	Pld	W	D	L	GF	GA	GD	Pts	FEY	RDC	STR	LS
1	(Netherlands) Feyenoord	6	5	0	1	17	6	+11	10	—	5–1	3–0	2–1
2	(Belgium) RDC Molenbeek	6	3	1	2	8	9	−1	7	1–0	—	0–0	1–0
3	(France) Strasbourg	6	1	2	3	6	11	−5	4	1–3	3–1	—	0–2
4	(Switzerland) Lausanne-Sports	6	1	1	4	8	13	−5	3	2–4	1–4	2–2	—

Source: mogiel.net
Rules for classification: 1) Points; 2) Goal difference; 3) Goals scored; 4) Head-to-head points; 5) Away goals scored; 6) Draw.

=== Group A3 ===
Pos	Team	Pld	W	D	L	GF	GA	GD	Pts	LIL	SIO	BEE	GRO
1	(France) Lille	6	3	2	1	10	6	+4	8	—	0–0	0–1	2–1
2	(Switzerland) Sion	6	3	1	2	10	7	+3	7	1–3	—	5–2	3–1
3	(Belgium) Beerschot	6	1	3	2	6	9	−3	5	2–2	0–1	—	1–1
4	(Netherlands) Groningen	6	1	2	3	5	9	−4	4	1–3	1–0	0–0	—

Source: mogiel.net
Rules for classification: 1) Points; 2) Goal difference; 3) Goals scored; 4) Head-to-head points; 5) Away goals scored; 6) Draw.

=== Group A4 ===
Pos	Team	Pld	W	D	L	GF	GA	GD	Pts	LIE	GRE	ROU	GAE
1	(Belgium) Lierse	6	4	1	1	13	7	+6	9	—	3–1	1–1	2–0
2	(Switzerland) Grenchen	6	2	2	2	8	9	−1	6	2–1	—	1–1	2–0
3	(France) Rouen	6	1	3	2	9	15	−6	5	2–4	1–1	—	4–3
4	(Netherlands) Go Ahead Eagles	6	2	0	4	12	11	+1	4	1–2	3–1	5–0	—

Source: mogiel.net
Rules for classification: 1) Points; 2) Goal difference; 3) Goals scored; 4) Head-to-head points; 5) Away goals scored; 6) Draw.

=== Group B1 ===
Pos	Team	Pld	W	D	L	GF	GA	GD	Pts
1	(West Germany) Hannover	6	4	1	1	10	6	+4	9
2	(East Germany) 1. FC Lokomotive Leipzig	6	3	1	2	10	5	+5	7
3	(Sweden) Norrköping	6	2	0	4	12	16	−4	4
4	(Austria) Rapid Wien	6	1	2	3	9	14	−5	4

=== Group B2 ===
Pos	Team	Pld	W	D	L	GF	GA	GD	Pts
1	(Poland) Zagłębie Sosnowiec	6	5	0	1	14	7	+7	10
2	(West Germany) Schalke 04	6	3	1	2	7	7	0	7
3	(Austria) Wacker Innsbruck	6	2	1	3	15	10	+5	5
4	(Sweden) Djurgården	6	1	0	5	6	18	−12	2

=== Group B3 ===
Pos	Team	Pld	W	D	L	GF	GA	GD	Pts	BYT	BRE	ELF	GCZ
1	(Poland) Polonia Bytom	6	5	0	1	16	6	+10	10	—	2–1	3–0	5–1
2	(West Germany) Werder Bremen	6	3	2	1	12	7	+5	8	2–0	—	4–1	1–1
3	(Sweden) Elfsborg	6	1	1	4	10	16	−6	3	1–2	2–2	—	5–2
4	(Switzerland) Grasshopper Club	6	1	1	4	9	18	−9	3	1–4	1–2	3–1	—

Source: mogiel.net
Rules for classification: 1) Points; 2) Goal difference; 3) Goals scored; 4) Head-to-head points; 5) Away goals scored; 6) Draw.

=== Group B4 ===
Pos	Team	Pld	W	D	L	GF	GA	GD	Pts	GÖT	JEN	B05	YFZ
1	(Sweden) Gothenburg	6	4	1	1	16	7	+9	9	—	4–0	2–1	2–2
2	(East Germany) FC Carl Zeiss Jena	6	4	1	1	10	9	+1	9	3–1	—	1–0	3–2
3	(Czechoslovakia) Bohemians Prague	6	2	1	3	12	8	+4	5	1–3	1–1	—	4–0
4	(Switzerland) Young Fellows Zürich	6	0	1	5	6	20	−14	1	0–4	1–2	1–5	—

Source: mogiel.net
Rules for classification: 1) Points; 2) Goal difference; 3) Goals scored; 4) Head-to-head points; 5) Away goals scored; 6) Draw.

=== Group B5 ===
Pos	Team	Pld	W	D	L	GF	GA	GD	Pts	RUC	FRE	YB	FIR
1	(Poland) Ruch Chorzów	6	6	0	0	18	6	+12	12	—	5–1	4–3	2–0
2	(Denmark) Frem	6	2	1	3	11	11	0	5	1–2	—	4–1	4–1
3	(Switzerland) Young Boys	6	1	2	3	8	12	−4	4	0–2	0–0	—	2–0
4	(Austria) First Vienna	6	1	1	4	6	14	−8	3	1–3	2–1	2–2	—

Source: mogiel.net
Rules for classification: 1) Points; 2) Goal difference; 3) Goals scored; 4) Head-to-head points; 5) Away goals scored; 6) Draw.

=== Group B6 ===
Pos	Team	Pld	W	D	L	GF	GA	GD	Pts
1	(Czechoslovakia) Košice	6	3	3	0	11	4	+7	9
2	(East Germany) SG Dynamo Dresden	6	3	1	2	10	7	+3	7
3	(Sweden) AIK	6	3	1	2	7	11	−4	7
4	(Denmark) AGF	6	0	1	5	5	11	−6	1

=== Group B7 ===
Pos	Team	Pld	W	D	L	GF	GA	GD	Pts
1	(Denmark) KB	6	5	0	1	10	4	+6	10
2	(Czechoslovakia) Union Teplice	6	4	1	1	9	4	+5	9
3	(East Germany) 1. FC Union Berlin	6	1	1	4	4	7	−3	3
4	(Poland) Katowice	6	1	0	5	4	12	−8	2

=== Group B8 ===
Pos	Team	Pld	W	D	L	GF	GA	GD	Pts
1	(West Germany) Fortuna Düsseldorf	6	4	0	2	12	10	+2	8
2	(Austria) LASK	6	2	3	1	7	6	+1	7
3	(Denmark) Vejle	6	2	2	2	12	11	+1	6
4	(Czechoslovakia) Žilina	6	0	3	3	3	7	−4	3

== See also ==
- 1967–68 European Cup
- 1967–68 UEFA Cup Winners' Cup
- 1967–68 Inter-Cities Fairs Cup
