= 1966–67 Intertoto Cup =

Tournament details
- Teams: 40

Final positions
- Champions: (West Germany) Eintracht Frankfurt (1st title)
- Runners-up: (Czech Republic) Inter Bratislava

The 1966–67 Intertoto Cup was won by Eintracht Frankfurt in the final against Inter Bratislava, the last final of the tournament in the traditional '1 cup, 1 winner' sense. This was also last season that knock-out rounds were contested, until UEFA took over the competition in 1995, and the last ever occasion that an outright winner was declared. Although the competition had returned to the old 32 clubs / eight groups format the year before, this was altered with the tournament expanding to 40 clubs / ten groups.

This was Bratislava's third final in five seasons (the previous two, which they won, under their old name Slovnaft).

== Group stage ==
The teams were divided into ten groups of four clubs each - four in 'A' section, and six in 'B' section. Clubs from Belgium, France, Italy, the Netherlands and Switzerland were placed in 'A'; while clubs from Czechoslovakia, East Germany, Poland, Sweden and Yugoslavia were placed in 'B' groups. Club from West Germany were placed in both sections. The ten group winners advanced to the knock-out rounds.

=== Group A1 ===
Pos	Team	Pld	W	D	L	GF	GA	GD	Pts	EIN	VIC	FEY	CDF
1	(West Germany) Eintracht Frankfurt	6	5	0	1	15	9	+6	10	—	1–5	2–0	3–1
2	(Italy) Lanerossi Vicenza	6	2	1	3	10	11	−1	5	0–1	—	2–1	2–2
3	(Netherlands) Feyenoord	5	2	0	3	8	9	−1	4	1–4	2–0	—	4–1
4	(Switzerland) La Chaux-de-Fonds	5	1	1	3	10	14	−4	3	2–4	4–1	(Note: The match La Chaux-de-Fonds v Feyenoord was abandoned due to fog (the score at the time was 1–2). Since neither side could qualify, the match was not replayed nor the score allowed to stand.)	—

Source: mogiel.net
Rules for classification: 1) Points; 2) Goal difference; 3) Goals scored; 4) Head-to-head points; 5) Away goals scored; 6) Draw.

=== Group A2 ===
Pos	Team	Pld	W	D	L	GF	GA	GD	Pts	DWS	ATA	GRE	STR
1	(Netherlands) DWS	6	6	0	0	17	7	+10	12	—	1–0	4–2	4–1
2	(Italy) Atalanta	6	3	0	3	14	7	+7	6	0–1	—	4–0	6–1
3	(Switzerland) Grenchen	6	2	0	4	14	20	−6	4	3–5	3–2	—	4–2
4	(France) Strasbourg	6	1	0	5	9	20	−11	2	1–2	1–2	3–2	—

Source: mogiel.net
Rules for classification: 1) Points; 2) Goal difference; 3) Goals scored; 4) Head-to-head points; 5) Away goals scored; 6) Draw.

=== Group A3 ===
Pos	Team	Pld	W	D	L	GF	GA	GD	Pts	GAE	FOG	TIL	SIO
1	(Netherlands) Go Ahead Eagles	6	6	0	0	24	8	+16	12	—	2–0	3–2	6–4
2	(Italy) Foggia	6	4	0	2	6	3	+3	8	0–1	—	1–0	3–0
3	(Belgium) Tilleur	6	2	0	4	10	13	−3	4	0–8	0–1	—	6–0
4	(Switzerland) Sion	6	0	0	6	6	22	−16	0	2–4	0–1	0–2	—

Source: mogiel.net
Rules for classification: 1) Points; 2) Goal difference; 3) Goals scored; 4) Head-to-head points; 5) Away goals scored; 6) Draw.

=== Group A4 ===
Pos	Team	Pld	W	D	L	GF	GA	GD	Pts	ADO	BRE	LIÈ	BIE
1	(Netherlands) ADO Den Haag	6	5	1	0	16	8	+8	11	—	2–0	2–1	4–2
2	(Italy) Brescia	6	3	1	2	9	5	+4	7	1–1	—	1–0	3–1
3	(Belgium) Liège	6	3	0	3	13	6	+7	6	1–2	1–0	—	7–0
4	(Switzerland) Biel-Bienne	6	0	0	6	7	26	−19	0	3–5	0–4	1–3	—

Source: mogiel.net
Rules for classification: 1) Points; 2) Goal difference; 3) Goals scored; 4) Head-to-head points; 5) Away goals scored; 6) Draw.

=== Group B1 ===
Pos	Team	Pld	W	D	L	GF	GA	GD	Pts
1	(Poland) Zagłębie Sosnowiec	6	5	0	1	14	7	+7	10
2	(West Germany) Karlsruhe	6	3	0	3	8	7	+1	6
3	(East Germany) Hansa Rostock	6	3	0	3	13	13	0	6
4	(Socialist Federal Republic of Yugoslavia) Olimpija	6	1	0	5	7	15	−8	2

=== Group B2 ===
Pos	Team	Pld	W	D	L	GF	GA	GD	Pts
1	(Sweden) IFK Göteborg	6	4	1	1	13	14	−1	9
2	(Poland) Szombierki Bytom	6	3	0	3	17	9	+8	6
3	(East Germany) Lokomotive Leipzig	6	2	2	2	8	8	0	6
4	(Czechoslovakia) Union Teplice	6	1	1	4	6	13	−7	3

=== Group B3 ===
Pos	Team	Pld	W	D	L	GF	GA	GD	Pts
1	(Poland) Górnik Zabrze	6	4	1	1	17	10	+7	9
2	(West Germany) Eintracht Braunschweig	6	3	0	3	12	13	−1	6
3	(East Germany) Carl Zeiss Jena	6	2	1	3	9	12	−3	5
4	(Sweden) AIK	6	1	2	3	7	10	−3	4

=== Group B4 ===
Pos	Team	Pld	W	D	L	GF	GA	GD	Pts
1	(Czechoslovakia) Internacionál Bratislava	6	4	0	2	18	10	+8	8
2	(Poland) Wisła Kraków	6	3	1	2	13	10	+3	7
3	(Sweden) Malmö FF	6	2	1	3	9	13	−4	5
4	(West Germany) Kaiserslautern	6	2	0	4	12	19	−7	4

=== Group B5 ===
Pos	Team	Pld	W	D	L	GF	GA	GD	Pts
1	(East Germany) Vorwärts Berlin	6	5	0	1	13	8	+5	10
2	(Czechoslovakia) Košice	6	3	1	2	12	11	+1	7
3	(Sweden) Elfsborg	6	3	0	3	10	8	+2	6
4	(West Germany) Borussia Neunkirchen	6	0	1	5	6	14	−8	1

=== Group B6 ===
Pos	Team	Pld	W	D	L	GF	GA	GD	Pts
1	(Sweden) Norrköping	6	4	0	2	17	10	+7	8
2	(East Germany) Dynamo Dresden	6	3	1	2	13	7	+6	7
3	(Poland) Polonia Bytom	6	1	3	2	5	13	−8	5
4	(Czechoslovakia) Spartak Hradec Králové	6	1	2	3	3	8	−5	4

== Quarter-finals ==
- Górnik Zabrze and Vorwärts Berlin were participating in the European Cup, and were not allowed to continue in the Intertoto Cup after the summer break - they were withdrawn. Ironically, they drew each other in the first round of the European Cup, so could have been given a bye and rejoined later, as had happened with Malmö FF two seasons before.
- The remaining clubs were drawn into four ties

Team 1	Agg.	Team 2	1st leg	2nd leg
Norrköping (Sweden)	3–4	(West Germany) Eintracht Frankfurt	2–1	1–3
ADO Den Haag (Netherlands)	3–0	(Sweden) IFK Göteborg	1–0	2–0
Internacionál Bratislava (Czechoslovakia)	4–3	(Netherlands) Go Ahead Eagles	3–0	1–3
DWS (Netherlands)	2–5	(Poland) Zagłębie Sosnowiec	2–2	0–3

== Semi-finals ==
Team 1	Agg.	Team 2	1st leg	2nd leg
ADO Den Haag (Netherlands)	2–3	(Czechoslovakia) Internacionál Bratislava	1–0	1–3
Zagłębie Sosnowiec (Poland)	5–7	(West Germany) Eintracht Frankfurt	4–1	1–6

== Final ==
Team 1	Agg.	Team 2	1st leg	2nd leg
Internacionál Bratislava (Czechoslovakia)	3–4	(West Germany) Eintracht Frankfurt	2–3	1–1

== Abandonment of knock-out rounds ==
The Group Stage was always played during the summer break, with the knock-out rounds played as clubs could fit them in during the new season. However, this began to cause increasing problems. Firstly, clubs often had difficulty agreeing dates, and the tournament struggled to finish on time - for example, the 1964–65 final was not played until early June, over a year after the group games had started; and in 1963–64 and 1965–66 it was concluded in late May.

The second reason was the insistence of UEFA that any clubs taking part in the European Cup or UEFA Cup Winners' Cup could not continue games in other European competitions after the end of the summer break. This meant that clubs who had progressed from the Intertoto Group Stage, but were also competing in one of the UEFA competitions, had to be given byes through the Intertoto knock-out rounds (until they were eliminated from the UEFA competition), or withdrawn entirely. This made the knock-out rounds complicated, difficult to schedule, and weakened their significance.

The third reason was the lack of value attributed to the knock-out rounds. While reaching the final was seen as an achievement worthy of praise, the main purpose of the tournament, for most clubs who entered, was to provide football during the otherwise empty summer break. The financial benefits of participating in the pools competitions was also important. Having to arrange and play home-and-away knock-out matches during the new season was seen as difficult, expensive, and relatively pointless if the club in question was eliminated before reaching the Final or Semi-finals.

As a result, the knock-out rounds were abandoned, and for the next three decades there were no winners of the cup. The Group Stage continued much as before, with prize money still awarded according to a club's final group placing.

== See also ==
- 1966–67 European Cup
- 1966–67 UEFA Cup Winners' Cup
- 1966–67 Inter-Cities Fairs Cup
