= 2024–25 Odra Opole season =

Odra Opole
2024–25 season
- Manager: Radosław Sobolewski
- Stadium: Odra Municipal Stadium
- I liga: 8th
- Polish Cup: Pre-season
- Top goalscorer: League: Dawid Wolny (2); All: Dawid Wolny (2)
- Biggest win: Odra Opole 4–1 Pogoń Siedlce
Home colours	Away colours

The 2024–25 season is the 80th season in the history of Odra Opole, and the club's eighth consecutive season in the I liga. In addition to the domestic league, the team is scheduled to participate in the Polish Cup.

== Transfers ==
=== In ===
Pos.	Player	Transferred from	Fee	Date	Source
MF	(Poland) Jakub Pochcioł	(Poland) Górnika Zabrze II	Undisclosed	3 January 2025	

== Friendlies ==
=== Pre-season ===
29 June 2024 Friendly	Górnik Zabrze (Poland)	2–1	(Poland) Odra Opole	Zabrze
11:00	Ennali 41'; Olkowski 44'		1'	Stadium: Stadion im. Ernesta Pohla

3 July 2024 Friendly	Odra Opole (Poland)	1–1	(Poland) Rekord Bielsko-Biała
12:00	Domínguez 7'

6 July 2024 Friendly	GKS Katowice (Poland)	2–0	(Poland) Odra Opole	Katowice
11:00	Bergier 75'; Krawczyk 80'			Stadium: GKS Katowice Stadium

9 July 2024 Friendly	Ślęza Wrocław (Poland)	1–1	(Poland) Odra Opole
16:30

12 July 2024 Friendly	Raków Częstochowa (Poland)	1–1	(Poland) Odra Opole
10:45	Nowak 2'		Purzycki 47' (pen.)

== Competitions ==
=== Overall record ===
Competition	First match	Last match	Starting round	Record							
Competition	First match	Last match	Starting round	Pld	W	D	L	GF	GA	GD	Win %
I liga	19 July 2024	25–26 May 2025	Matchday 1	3	1	0	2	4	6	−2	33.33
Polish Cup				0	0	0	0	0	0	+0	—
Total				3	1	0	2	4	6	−2	33.33

Last updated: 4 August 2024
Source: Soccerway

=== I liga ===
==== League table ====
Pos	Team	Pld	W	D	L	GF	GA	GD	Pts	Promotion or Relegation
12	Stal Rzeszów	34	9	8	17	42	59	−17	35	
13	Chrobry Głogów	34	8	9	17	37	59	−22	33	
14	Odra Opole	34	7	9	18	31	61	−30	30 (Note: Ranked based on head-to-head points: Odra Opole 6 pts, Pogoń Siedlce 0 pts.)	
15	Pogoń Siedlce	34	7	9	18	38	53	−15	30	
16	Kotwica Kołobrzeg (Note: MKP Kotwica were denied a license to compete in the 2025–26 II liga. Then they ceased its activities and was not registered at any league level in the following season. At the same time, MKS Kotwica appeared in the regional league, but it is a different legal entity, even though supporters refer to it as the continuation of the club’s traditions.) (R)	34	6	11	17	29	55	−26	29	Relegation, then dissolution

Source: 1liga.org, 90minut.pl
Rules for classification: 1) Points; 2) Head-to-head points; 3) Head-to-head goal difference; 4) Goal difference; 6) Goals scored; 7) Number of wins; 8) Number of away wins.
(Note: Head-to-head record is used only after all the matches between the teams in question have been played)
(R) Relegated
Notes:

Semi-finals; 29 May 2025
3	Wisła Płock	2
6	Polonia Warsaw	1
4	Wisła Kraków	0
5	Miedź Legnica	1

Final; 1 June 2025
3	Wisła Płock	2
5	Miedź Legnica	0

==== Results summary ====
Overall								Home						Away					
Pld	W	D	L	GF	GA	GD	Pts	W	D	L	GF	GA	GD	W	D	L	GF	GA	GD
3	1	0	2	4	6	−2	3	1	0	1	4	3	+1	0	0	1	0	3	−3

Last updated: 4 August 2024.

==== Results by round ====
Round	1	2	3
Ground	H	H	A
Result	L	W	L
Position	17	8	

Updated to match(es) played on 4 August 2024. Source:
A = Away; H = Home; W = Win; D = Draw; L = Loss

==== Matches ====
The match schedule was released on 12 June 2024.

19 July 2024 1	Odra Opole	0–2	Ruch Chorzów	Opole
20:30	Wolny (yellow card) 90+4'		Novothny 13', (yellow card) 90'; Góra (yellow card) 75'; Szczepan 88' (pen.)	Stadium: Odra Municipal Stadium; Referee: Karol Arys

28 July 2024 2	Odra Opole	4–1	Pogoń Siedlce	Opole
12:00	Wolny 2', 53', (yellow card) 34'; Łyszczarz 20'; Szrek (yellow card) 28'; Domínguez (yellow card) 70'; Purzycki 76'		Burka (yellow card) 23'; Pyrdoł (yellow card) 71'; Demianiuk 90+2' (pen.)	Stadium: Odra Municipal Stadium; Referee: Mateusz Piszczelok

4 August 2024 3	Termalica Nieciecza	3–0	Odra Opole	Nieciecza
17:00	Putivtsev 21'; Karasek 62'; Ciesla 81'			Stadium: Stadion Sportowy Bruk-Bet Termalica; Referee: Tomasz Kwiatkowski
