= 2024–25 MKP Pogoń Siedlce season =

MKP Pogoń Siedlce
2024–25 season
- Manager: Marek Brzozowski
- Stadium: Stadion ROSRRiT w Siedlcach
- I liga: 16th
- Polish Cup: Preliminary round
- Top goalscorer: League: Cezary Demianiuk; Lukáš Hrnčiar (1); All: Cezary Demianiuk; Lukáš Hrnčiar (1)
- Biggest defeat: Odra Opole 4–1 Pogoń Siedlce
Home colours	Away colours

The 2024–25 season was the 80th season in the history of MKP Pogoń Siedlce, and the club's first season in I liga. In addition to the domestic league, the team participated in the Polish Cup.

== Friendlies ==
=== Pre-season ===
6 July 2024 Friendly	Pogoń Siedlce (Poland)	2–3	(Poland) Polonia Warsaw
11:00
Note: Two periods of 60 minutes

12 July 2024 Friendly	Pogoń Siedlce (Poland)	2–1	(Poland) Znicz Pruszkow
17:10
Note: Two periods of 60 minutes

21 July 2024 Friendly	Pogoń Siedlce (Poland)	0–3	(Poland) ŁKS Łomża
11:15

== Competitions ==
=== Overall record ===
Competition	First match	Last match	Starting round	Final position	Record							
Competition	First match	Last match	Starting round	Final position	Pld	W	D	L	GF	GA	GD	Win %
I liga	20 July 2024	25–26 May 2025	Matchday 1		6	0	1	5	4	11	−7	0.00
Polish Cup	6 August 2024		Preliminary round	Preliminary round	1	0	0	1	0	2	−2	0.00
Total					7	0	1	6	4	13	−9	0.00

Last updated: 21 August 2024
Source: Soccerway

=== I liga ===
==== League table ====
Pos	Team	Pld	W	D	L	GF	GA	GD	Pts	Promotion or Relegation
13	Chrobry Głogów	34	8	9	17	37	59	−22	33	
14	Odra Opole	34	7	9	18	31	61	−30	30 (Note: Ranked based on head-to-head points: Odra Opole 6 pts, Pogoń Siedlce 0 pts.)	
15	Pogoń Siedlce	34	7	9	18	38	53	−15	30	
16	Kotwica Kołobrzeg (Note: MKP Kotwica were denied a license to compete in the 2025–26 II liga. Then they ceased its activities and was not registered at any league level in the following season. At the same time, MKS Kotwica appeared in the regional league, but it is a different legal entity, even though supporters refer to it as the continuation of the club’s traditions.) (R)	34	6	11	17	29	55	−26	29	Relegation, then dissolution
17	Warta Poznań (R)	34	6	6	22	22	56	−34	24	Relegation to II liga

Source: 1liga.org, 90minut.pl
Rules for classification: 1) Points; 2) Head-to-head points; 3) Head-to-head goal difference; 4) Goal difference; 6) Goals scored; 7) Number of wins; 8) Number of away wins.
(Note: Head-to-head record is used only after all the matches between the teams in question have been played)
(R) Relegated
Notes:

Semi-finals; 29 May 2025
3	Wisła Płock	2
6	Polonia Warsaw	1
4	Wisła Kraków	0
5	Miedź Legnica	1

Final; 1 June 2025
3	Wisła Płock	2
5	Miedź Legnica	0

==== Results summary ====
Overall								Home						Away					
Pld	W	D	L	GF	GA	GD	Pts	W	D	L	GF	GA	GD	W	D	L	GF	GA	GD
6	0	1	5	4	11	−7	1	0	0	3	2	5	−3	0	1	2	2	6	−4

Last updated: 21 August 2024.

==== Results by round ====
Round	1	2	3	4
Ground	H	A	A	H
Result	L	L	D	L
Position	13			

Updated to match(es) played on 11 August 2024. Source:
A = Away; H = Home; W = Win; D = Draw; L = Loss

==== Matches ====
The match schedule was released on 12 June 2024.

20 July 2024 1	Pogoń Siedlce	1–2	Chrobry Głogów	Siedlce
17:00	Miś (yellow card) 68'; Hrnčiar 90+3'		Bonecki 15'; Bartlewicz 45'; Mandrysz (yellow card) 83'; Kuzdra (yellow card) 89'	Stadium: Stadion ROSRRiT w Siedlcach; Referee: Piotr Idzik

28 July 2024 2	Odra Opole	4–1	Pogoń Siedlce	Opole
12:00	Wolny 2', 53', (yellow card) 34'; Łyszczarz 20'; Szrek (yellow card) 28'; Domínguez (yellow card) 70'; Purzycki 76'		Burka (yellow card) 23'; Pyrdoł (yellow card) 71'; Demianiuk 90+2' (pen.)	Stadium: Odra Municipal Stadium; Referee: Mateusz Piszczelok

2 August 2024 3	Ruch Chorzów	1–1	Pogoń Siedlce	Chorzów
20:00	Starzyński 56'		Pik 84'	Stadium: Ruch Chorzów Stadium; Referee: Piotr Idzik

11 August 2024 4	Pogoń Siedlce	1–2	Termalica Nieciecza	Siedlce
12:00	Demianiuk 45'		Trubeha 28'; Ambrosiewicz 45+3'	Stadium: Stadion ROSRRiT w Siedlcach; Referee: Grzegorz Kawałko

=== Polish Cup ===
6 August 2024 Preliminary round	Pogoń Siedlce	0–2	Lech Poznań II	Siedlce
17:00 UTC+2			Wilak 6'; Wichtowski 35'	Stadium: Stadion ROSRRiT w Siedlcach
