= Oskar Krzyżak =

Polish footballer (born 2002)

Personal information
- Full name: Oskar Krzyżak
- Date of birth: 24 January 2002 (age 24)
- Place of birth: Częstochowa, Poland
- Height: 1.86 m (6 ft 1 in)
- Position: Centre-back

Team information
- Current team: Polonia Bytom
- Number: 30

Youth career
- Znicz Kłobuck
- 2012–2013: APN Częstochowa
- 2013–2020: Raków Częstochowa

Senior career*
Years	Team	Apps	(Gls)
2020–2024	Raków Częstochowa	3	(0)
2020–2021	→ Bytovia Bytów (loan)	17	(2)
2021–2022	→ Skra Częstochowa (loan)	17	(0)
2022–2023	→ Skra Częstochowa (loan)	13	(1)
2023	→ Warta Poznań (loan)	2	(0)
2024–2025	Pogoń Siedlce	14	(0)
2025–	Polonia Bytom	35	(2)

International career
2017–2018	Poland U16	9	(0)
2020	Poland U19	1	(0)
2021	Poland U20	1	(0)
2023	Poland U21	1	(0)
- * Club domestic league appearances and goals as of 08:55, 27 May 2026 (UTC)

Oskar Krzyżak (born 24 January 2002) is a Polish professional footballer who plays as a centre-back for I liga club Polonia Bytom.

== Career statistics ==
As of match played 24 May 2026

Appearances and goals by club, season and competition
Club	Season	League			Polish Cup		Europe		Other		Total	
Club	Season	Division	Apps	Goals	Apps	Goals	Apps	Goals	Apps	Goals	Apps	Goals
Raków Częstochowa	2020–21	Ekstraklasa	0	0	0	0	—		—		0	0
Raków Częstochowa	2021–22	Ekstraklasa	3	0	0	0	—		—		3	0
Raków Częstochowa	Total		3	0	0	0	—		—		3	0
Bytovia Bytów (loan)	2020–21	II liga	17	2	—		—		—		17	2
Skra Częstochowa (loan)	2021–22	I liga	17	0	1	0	—		—		18	0
Skra Częstochowa (loan)	2022–23	I liga	13	1	0	0	—		—		13	1
Warta Poznań (loan)	2023–24	Ekstraklasa	2	0	1	0	—		—		3	0
Pogoń Siedlce	2024–25	I liga	14	0	0	0	—		—		14	0
Polonia Bytom	2024–25	II liga	14	1	—		—		—		14	1
Polonia Bytom	2025–26	I liga	21	1	3	0	—		—		24	1
Polonia Bytom	Total		35	2	3	0	—		—		38	2
Career total			101	5	5	0	—		—		106	5

== Honours ==
Raków Częstochowa II

- IV liga Silesia I: 2020–21, 2021–22
- Polish Cup (Częstochowa regionals): 2019–20

Polonia Bytom

- II liga: 2024–25
