= UEFA Intertoto Cup =

European association football tournament for clubs

- Organiser(s): UEFA (from 1995)
- Founded: 1961; 65 years ago
- Abolished: 2008; 18 years ago
- Region: Europe
- Teams: 50
- Related competitions: UEFA Cup (merged with)
- Last champions: (Portugal) Braga (1st title)
- Most championships: (Germany) Hamburger SV (Germany) Schalke 04 (Germany) VfB Stuttgart (Spain) Villarreal (2 titles each)

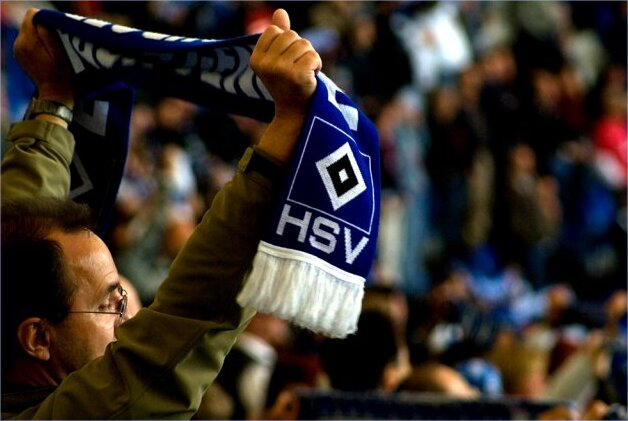
Hamburger SV won the UEFA Intertoto Cup two times, a record jointly held with Schalke 04, VfB Stuttgart and Villarreal.

The UEFA Intertoto Cup (from Latin: inter, "between" and German: toto, "betting pool"), originally called the International Football Cup, was a summer football competition between European clubs. The competition was discontinued after the 2008 tournament.

The tournament was founded in 1961–62, but was only taken over by UEFA in 1995. Initially, the tournament ended with a single champion, who received the Intertoto Cup. Starting in 1967, the tournament ended with a number of group winners (7 to 14 winners), who received cash prizes. When UEFA took on the tournament, it became a qualifier for the UEFA Cup, with 2 to 11 Intertoto winners advancing to the second qualifying round of the UEFA Cup.

Any club who wished to participate had to apply for entry, with the highest placed clubs (by league position in their domestic league) at the end of the season entering the competition. The club did not have to be ranked directly below the clubs which had qualified for another UEFA competition; if the club that was in that position did not apply, they would not be eligible to compete, with the place instead going to the club that did apply.

The cup billed itself as providing both an opportunity for clubs who otherwise would not get the chance to enter the UEFA Cup and as an opportunity for sports lotteries (or pools) to continue during the summer. This reflects its background, which was as a tournament solely for football pools. In 1995, the tournament came under official UEFA sanctioning and UEFA Cup qualification places were granted. Initially, two were provided; this was increased to three after one year, but in 2006, it was again increased to the final total of 11.

== History ==
=== Beginnings ===
The Intertoto Cup was the idea of three men: Malmö FF chairman Eric Persson; the later FIFA vice-president and founder of the Inter-Cities Fairs Cup, Ernst B. Thommen; and the Austrian coach Karl Rappan, who coached the Switzerland national team at the 1938 and 1954 FIFA World Cups. The "Cup for the Cupless" was also heavily promoted by the Swiss newspaper Sport. It derived its name from Toto, the German term for football pools.

Thommen, who had set up football betting pools in Switzerland in 1932, had a major interest in having purposeful matches played in the summer break. UEFA were initially disinclined to support the tournament, finding its betting background distasteful; nevertheless they permitted the new tournament but refrained from getting officially involved. Clubs which qualified for one of the official continental competitions, such as the European Champions Cups and Cup Winners' Cup, were not allowed to participate.

=== Early independent tournaments ===
The first tournament was held in 1961 as the International Football Cup (IFC). Initially the Cup had a group stage, which led to knockout matches culminating in a final. By 1967, it had become difficult to organize the games, and so the knockout rounds and the final were scrapped, leaving the tournament without a single winner. Instead, group winners received prizes of CHF10,000-15,000.

=== Entering the UEFA fold ===
By 1995, UEFA had reconsidered their opinion, took official control of the tournament and changed its format. Initially, two winners were given a place in the UEFA Cup. The success of one of the first winners, Bordeaux, in reaching the final of the 1995–96 UEFA Cup encouraged UEFA to add a third UEFA Cup place in 1996.

Many clubs disliked the competition and saw it as disruptive to their preparations for the new season. As a consequence, they did not nominate themselves for participation even if entitled. In particular, following its 1995 relaunch, clubs in England were sceptical about the competition; after initially being offered three places in the cup, all English top division teams rejected the chance to take part. Following the threat of bans of English teams from all UEFA competitions, three English clubs were entered but fielded weakened teams. UEFA's punishment was to dock England a fourth UEFA Cup qualification place in 1995–96 "due to the conduct of Tottenham and Wimbledon in last season's Intertoto Cup".

In subsequent years, UEFA made it possible for nations to forfeit Intertoto places. For example, in 1998, Scotland, San Marino, and Moldova forfeited their places, while England, Portugal, and Greece forfeited one of their two, Crystal Palace being the sole English entrant despite finishing bottom of the Premier League. However, UEFA rejected the idea that the tournament was disruptive, pointing out that, among other successes, all three 2004 Intertoto Cup winners went on to qualify for the Champions League in 2004–05: Schalke and Lille qualified directly, while Villarreal progressed through the qualifying rounds.

=== Abolition ===
Following the election of new UEFA president Michel Platini, the Intertoto Cup was abolished in 2008, as part of several changes to the UEFA Cup system. Instead of teams qualifying for the Intertoto Cup, they would now qualify directly for the qualifying stages of the UEFA Europa League, which was expanded to four rounds to accommodate them. The UEFA Europa Conference League was introduced in 2021 as a third-tier European tournament.

== Format ==
When the competition was taken over by UEFA in 1995, the format was both a group stage and a knock-out stage; 60 teams were split into 12 groups of five with the 16 best teams then contesting the knock-out stage with two-legged ties at each stage, the two winning finalists qualifying for the UEFA Cup. In 1996 and 1997, just the 12 group winners entered the knock-out round, with now three finalists advancing. Nations were allocated places according to their UEFA coefficients, much as with other UEFA tournaments.

The group stage was scrapped for the 1998 tournament, which became a straight knock-out tournament, with clubs from more successful nations entering at a later stage. This arrangement lasted until 2005.

From the 2006 tournament, the format for the Cup changed. There were three rounds instead of the previous five, and the 11 winning teams from the third round went through to the second qualifying round of the UEFA Cup. The clubs which were furthest in the UEFA Cup would each be awarded with a trophy. The first club that received that trophy (a plaque) was Newcastle United.

Only one team from each national association was allowed to enter. However, if one or more nations did not take up their place, the possibility was left open for nations to have a second entrant. Seedings and entry were determined by each association. Teams from the weakest federations entered at the first round stage, while those from mid-level federations entered in the second round, and those from the strongest federations entered in the third round.

== Results ==
=== Before UEFA sanctioning ===
==== Winners by year (1961–1967) ====
The results shown are the aggregate total over two legs unless otherwise noted.

Season	Winners	Runners-up	Results
International Football Cup
1961–62	(Netherlands) **Ajax**	(Netherlands) Feyenoord	4–2*
1962–63	(Czechoslovakia) **Inter Bratislava**	(Italy) Padova	1–0*
1963–64	(Czechoslovakia) **Inter Bratislava**	(Poland) Polonia Bytom	1–0*
Intertoto Cup
1964–65	(Poland) **Polonia Bytom**	(East Germany) 1. FC Lokomotive Leipzig	5–4
1965–66	(East Germany) **1. FC Lokomotive Leipzig**	(Sweden) IFK Norrköping	4–1
1966–67	(West Germany) **Eintracht Frankfurt**	(Czechoslovakia) Inter Bratislava	4–3
* – Single match finals

==== No declared winners (1967–1994) ====
During this time there were no competition winners, as only group stages were contested. The outright winners (determined by their best champions) are marked in bold.

===== Region system (1967, 1968, 1970) =====
Year	Group A1	Group A2	Group A3	Group A4	Group A5	Group A6	Group B1	Group B2	Group B3	Group B4	Group B5	Group B6	Group B7	Group B8
1967	(Switzerland) Lugano	(Netherlands) Feyenoord	(France) Lille	(Belgium) Lierse	–	–	(West Germany) Hannover 96	(Poland) Zagłębie Sosnowiec	(Poland) Polonia Bytom	(Sweden) Gothenburg	(Poland) **Ruch Chorzów**	(Czechoslovakia) Košice	(Denmark) KB	(West Germany) Fortuna Düsseldorf
1968	(West Germany) Nuremberg	(Netherlands) Ajax	(Portugal) Sporting	(Netherlands) Feyenoord	(Spain) Español	(Netherlands) ADO Den Haag	(East Germany) Karl-Marx-Stadt	(East Germany) Empor Rostock	(Czechoslovakia) Slovan Bratislava	(Czechoslovakia) Košice	(Czechoslovakia) Lokomotíva Košice	(Poland) **Odra Opole**	(West Germany) Eintracht Braunschweig	(Poland) Legia Warsaw
1970	(Czechoslovakia) Slovan Bratislava	(West Germany) Hamburger SV	(Czechoslovakia) Union Teplice	(Netherlands) MVV	(Czechoslovakia) Košice	–	(West Germany) Eintracht Braunschweig	(Czechoslovakia) **Slavia Prague**	(France) Marseille	(Sweden) Öster	(Poland) Wisła Kraków	Austria Salzburg	(Czechoslovakia) Baník Ostrava	(Poland) Polonia Bytom

===== Non-region system (1969, 1971–1994) =====
Year	Group 1	Group 2	Group 3	Group 4	Group 5	Group 6	Group 7	Group 8	Group 9	Group 10	Group 11	Group 12
1969	(Sweden) Malmö FF	(Poland) Szombierki Bytom	(West Germany) SpVgg Fürth	(Czechoslovakia) Žilina	(Sweden) Norrköping	(Czechoslovakia) **Jednota Trenčín**	(Denmark) Frem	(Poland) Wisła Kraków	(Poland) Odra Opole	–	–	–
1971	(West Germany) Hertha BSC	(Poland) **Stal Mielec**	(Switzerland) Servette	(Czechoslovakia) Třinec	(Sweden) Åtvidaberg	(West Germany) Eintracht Braunschweig	Austria Salzburg	–	–	–	–	–
1972	(Czechoslovakia) **Nitra**	(Sweden) Norrköping	(France) Saint-Étienne	(Czechoslovakia) Slavia Prague	(Czechoslovakia) Slovan Bratislava	(West Germany) Eintracht Braunschweig	(West Germany) Hannover 96	(Austria) VÖEST Linz	–	–	–	–
1973	(West Germany) Hannover 96	(Czechoslovakia) Slovan Bratislava	(West Germany) Hertha BSC	(Switzerland) Zürich	(Poland) Rybnik	(Czechoslovakia) Union Teplice	(Netherlands) Feyenoord	(Poland) Wisła Kraków	(Czechoslovakia) **Nitra**	(Sweden) Öster	–	–
1974	(Switzerland) **Zürich**	(West Germany) Hamburger SV	(Sweden) Malmö FF	(Belgium) Standard Liège	(Czechoslovakia) Slovan Bratislava	(Czechoslovakia) Spartak Trnava	(West Germany) Duisburg	(Czechoslovakia) Baník Ostrava	(Czechoslovakia) Košice	(Portugal) CUF	–	–
1975	(Austria) Tirol Innsbruck	(Austria) **VÖEST Linz**	(West Germany) Eintracht Braunschweig	(Poland) Zagłębie Sosnowiec	(Czechoslovakia) Zbrojovka Brno	(Poland) Rybnik	(Sweden) Åtvidaberg	(West Germany) 1. FC Kaiserslautern	(Portugal) Belenenses	(Socialist Federal Republic of Yugoslavia) Čelik Zenica	–	–
1976	(Switzerland) Young Boys	(West Germany) Hertha BSC	(Czechoslovakia) Union Teplice	(Czechoslovakia) Baník Ostrava	(Czechoslovakia) Zbrojovka Brno	(Czechoslovakia) Spartak Trnava	(Czechoslovakia) Internacionál Bratislava	(Sweden) Öster	(Sweden) Djurgården	(Socialist Federal Republic of Yugoslavia) Vojvodina	(Poland) **Widzew Łódź**	–
1977	(Sweden) Halmstad	(West Germany) Duisburg	(Czechoslovakia) Internacionál Bratislava	(Bulgaria) Slavia Sofia	(Czechoslovakia) **Slavia Prague**	(Denmark) Frem	(Czechoslovakia) Jednota Trenčín	(Czechoslovakia) Slovan Bratislava	(Sweden) Öster	(Poland) Pogoń Szczecin	–	–
1978	(West Germany) Duisburg	(Czechoslovakia) Slavia Prague	(West Germany) Hertha BSC	(West Germany) Eintracht Braunschweig	(Sweden) Malmö FF	(Czechoslovakia) Lokomotiva Košice	(Czechoslovakia) **Tatran Prešov**	(Israel) Maccabi Netanya	(Austria) GAK	–	–	–
1979	(West Germany) **Werder Bremen**	(Switzerland) Grasshopper	(West Germany) Eintracht Braunschweig	(Czechoslovakia) Bohemians Prague	(Czechoslovakia) Spartak Trnava	(Czechoslovakia) Zbrojovka Brno	(Bulgaria) Pirin Blagoevgrad	(Czechoslovakia) Baník Ostrava	–	–	–	–
1980	(Belgium) Standard Liège	(Czechoslovakia) Bohemians Prague	(Israel) Maccabi Netanya	(Czechoslovakia) Sparta Prague	(Czechoslovakia) Nitra	(Sweden) Halmstad	(Sweden) Malmö FF	(Sweden) **Gothenburg**	(Sweden) Elfsborg	–	–	–
1981	(Austria) Wiener Sportclub	(Belgium) Standard Liège	(West Germany) **Werder Bremen**	(Socialist Federal Republic of Yugoslavia) Budućnost	(Denmark) AGF	(Belgium) Molenbeek	(Sweden) Gothenburg	(West Germany) Stuttgarter Kickers	(Czechoslovakia) Cheb	–	–	–
1982	(Belgium) Standard Liège	(Poland) Widzew Łódź	(Denmark) AGF	(Denmark) Lyngby	(Austria) Admira Wacker Mödling	(Czechoslovakia) **Bohemians Prague**	(Sweden) Brage	(Sweden) Öster	(Sweden) Gothenburg	–	–	–
1983	(Netherlands) Twente	(Switzerland) Young Boys	(Poland) Pogoń Szczecin	(Israel) Maccabi Netanya	(Socialist Federal Republic of Yugoslavia) Sloboda Tuzla	(Czechoslovakia) Bohemians Prague	(Sweden) Gothenburg	(Sweden) **Hammarby**	(Hungary) Videoton	(Czechoslovakia) Vítkovice	–	–
1984	(Czechoslovakia) Bohemians Prague	(Denmark) AGF	(West Germany) Fortuna Düsseldorf	(Belgium) Standard Liège	(Sweden) AIK	(Sweden) Malmö FF	(Hungary) **Videoton**	(Israel) Maccabi Netanya	(Switzerland) Zürich	(Poland) GKS Katowice	–	–
1985	(West Germany) Werder Bremen	(East Germany) Rot-Weiss Erfurt	(Sweden) Gothenburg	(Sweden) AIK	(East Germany) Wismut Aue	(Czechoslovakia) Sparta Prague	(Poland) **Górnik Zabrze**	(Israel) Maccabi Haifa	(Czechoslovakia) Baník Ostrava	(Hungary) Újpesti Dózsa	(Hungary) MTK Hungária	–
1986	(West Germany) Fortuna Düsseldorf	(East Germany) Union Berlin	(Sweden) Malmö FF	(East Germany) Rot-Weiss Erfurt	(Czechoslovakia) Sigma Olomouc	(Hungary) Újpesti Dózsa	(Denmark) Brøndby	(Denmark) **Lyngby**	(Poland) Lech Poznań	(Sweden) Gothenburg	(Czechoslovakia) Slavia Prague	(East Germany) Carl Zeiss Jena
1987	(East Germany) Carl Zeiss Jena	(Poland) Pogoń Szczecin	(East Germany) Wismut Aue	(Hungary) Tatabánya	(Sweden) Malmö FF	(Sweden) AIK	(Bulgaria) Etar Veliko Tarnovo	(Denmark) **Brøndby**	–	–	–	–
1988	(Sweden) Malmö FF	(Sweden) Gothenburg	(Czechoslovakia) Baník Ostrava	Austria Wien	(Switzerland) Young Boys	(West Germany) 1. FC Kaiserslautern	(Denmark) **Ikast FS**	(East Germany) Carl Zeiss Jena	(Switzerland) Grasshopper	(West Germany) Karlsruher SC	(West Germany) Bayer Uerdingen	–
1989	(Switzerland) Luzern	(Denmark) Boldklubben 1903	(Austria) Tirol Innsbruck	(Switzerland) Grasshopper	(Hungary) Tatabánya	(Denmark) Næstved	(Sweden) **Örebro**	(Czechoslovakia) Sparta Prague	(Czechoslovakia) Baník Ostrava	(Sweden) Örgryte	(West Germany) 1. FC Kaiserslautern	–
1990	(Switzerland) Neuchâtel Xamax	(Austria) Tirol Innsbruck	(Poland) **Lech Poznań**	(Czechoslovakia) Slovan Bratislava	(Sweden) Malmö FF	(Sweden) GAIS	(Switzerland) Luzern	(Austria) First Vienna	(East Germany) Chemnitz	(West Germany) Bayer Uerdingen	(Denmark) Odense	–
1991	(Switzerland) Neuchâtel Xamax	(Switzerland) Lausanne-Sports	Austria Salzburg	(Czechoslovakia) Dukla Banská Bystrica	(Denmark) Boldklubben 1903	(Switzerland) Grasshopper	(Germany) Bayer Uerdingen	(Czechoslovakia) Dunajská Streda	(Austria) Tirol Innsbruck	(Sweden) **Örebro**	–	–
1992	(Denmark) Copenhagen	(Hungary) Siófok	(Germany) Bayer Uerdingen	(Germany) Karlsruher SC	(Austria) Rapid Wien	(Denmark) Lyngby	(Czechoslovakia) Slovan Bratislava	(Denmark) AaB	(Czechoslovakia) **Slavia Prague**	(Bulgaria) Lokomotiv Gorna Oryahovitsa	–	–
1993	(Austria) Rapid Wien	(Sweden) **Trelleborg**	(Sweden) Norrköping	(Sweden) Malmö FF	(Czechoslovakia) **Slavia Prague**	(Switzerland) Zürich	(Switzerland) Young Boys	(Germany) Dynamo Dresden	–	–	–	–
1994	(Sweden) Halmstad	(Switzerland) Young Boys	(Sweden) **AIK**	(Germany) Hamburger SV	(Hungary) Békéscsaba	(Slovakia) Slovan Bratislava	(Switzerland) Grasshopper	Austria Wien	–	–	–	–

=== Winners by year (UEFA) ===
==== 1995–2005 ====
The results shown are the aggregate total over two legs. Listed are each year's three teams (two in 1995) that won the final matches, qualifying them for the UEFA Cup.

Year	Winners	Runners-up	Result
1995	(France) Strasbourg	(Austria) Tirol Innsbruck	7–2
1995	(France) Bordeaux	(Germany) Karlsruher SC	4–2
1996	(Germany) Karlsruher SC	(Belgium) Standard Liège	3–2
1996	(France) Guingamp	(Russia) Rotor Volgograd	2–2 (a)
1996	(Denmark) Silkeborg	(Croatia) Segesta	2–2 (a)
1997	(France) Bastia	(Sweden) Halmstad	2–1
1997	(France) Lyon	(France) Montpellier	4–2
1997	(France) Auxerre	(Germany) Duisburg	2–0
1998	(Spain) Valencia	Austria Salzburg	4–1
1998	(Germany) Werder Bremen	(Serbia and Montenegro) Vojvodina	2–1
1998	(Italy) Bologna	(Poland) Ruch Chorzów	3–0
1999	(France) Montpellier	(Germany) Hamburger SV	2–2 (3–0 pen.)
1999	(Italy) Juventus	(France) Rennes	4–2
1999	(England) West Ham United	(France) Metz	3–2
2000	(Italy) Udinese	(Czech Republic) Sigma Olomouc	6–4
2000	(Spain) Celta Vigo	(Russia) Zenit Saint Petersburg	4–3
2000	(Germany) VfB Stuttgart	(France) Auxerre	3–1
2001	(England) Aston Villa	(Switzerland) Basel	5–2
2001	(France) Paris Saint-Germain	(Italy) Brescia	1–1 (a)
2001	(France) Troyes	(England) Newcastle United	4–4 (a)
2002	(Spain) Málaga	(Spain) Villarreal	2–1
2002	(England) Fulham	(Italy) Bologna	5–3
2002	(Germany) VfB Stuttgart	(France) Lille	2–1
2003	(Germany) Schalke 04	(Austria) Pasching	2–0
2003	(Spain) Villarreal	(Netherlands) Heerenveen	2–1
2003	(Italy) Perugia	(Germany) VfL Wolfsburg	3–0
2004	(France) Lille	(Portugal) Leiria	2–0 (a.e.t.)
2004	(Germany) Schalke 04	(Czech Republic) Slovan Liberec	3–1
2004	(Spain) Villarreal	(Spain) Atlético Madrid	2–2 (3–1 pen.)
2005	(Germany) Hamburger SV	(Spain) Valencia	1–0
2005	(France) Lens	(Romania) CFR Cluj	4–2
2005	(France) Marseille	(Spain) Deportivo La Coruña	5–3

==== 2006–2008 ====
Listed are all 11 teams that won the Intertoto Cup, qualifying for the UEFA Cup. The outright winners (determined by the best performance in the UEFA Cup) are marked in bold.

Year	Outright winners	Joint winners				
2006	(England) **Newcastle United**	(France) Auxerre	(Switzerland) Grasshopper	(Denmark) OB	(France) Marseille	(Germany) Hertha BSC
2006	(England) **Newcastle United**	(Turkey) Kayserispor	(Cyprus) Ethnikos Achna	(Netherlands) Twente	(Austria) Ried	(Slovenia) Maribor
2007	(Germany) **Hamburg**	(Spain) Atlético Madrid	(Denmark) AaB	(Italy) Sampdoria	(England) Blackburn Rovers	(France) Lens
2007	(Germany) **Hamburg**	(Portugal) Leiria	(Austria) Rapid Wien	(Sweden) Hammarby IF	(Romania) Oţelul Galaţi	(Kazakhstan) Tobol
2008	(Portugal) **Braga**	(England) Aston Villa	(Spain) Deportivo La Coruña	(Germany) VfB Stuttgart	(Norway) Rosenborg	(Italy) Napoli
2008	(Portugal) **Braga**	(France) Rennes	(Romania) Vaslui	(Sweden) Elfsborg	(Switzerland) Grasshopper	(Austria) Sturm Graz

== Statistics ==
From 2006 onwards, the final round was no longer termed as the "Final", but instead simply as the "Third Round". In addition, there were 11 winners, compared to three under the old system. The clubs which progressed furthest in the UEFA Cup were awarded with a trophy (plaque).

Performance by club (Note: Does not count the teams that lost to the winners from 2006 to 2008, as the champions were determined by the team that progressed the furthest.)
Club	Winners	Runners-up	Years won	Years runner-up
(Spain) Villarreal	2	1	2003, 2004	2002
(Germany) Hamburger SV	2	1	2005, 2007	1999
(Germany) VfB Stuttgart	2	0	2000, 2002	—
(Germany) Schalke 04	2	0	2003, 2004	—
(Germany) Karlsruher SC	1	1	1996	1995
(France) Auxerre	1	1	1997	2000
(Italy) Bologna	1	1	1998	2002
(Spain) Valencia	1	1	1998	2005
(France) Montpellier	1	1	1999	1997
(France) Lille	1	1	2004	2002
(England) Newcastle United	1	1	2006	2001
(France) Bordeaux	1	0	1995	—
(France) Strasbourg	1	0	1995	—
(France) Guingamp	1	0	1996	—
(Denmark) Silkeborg	1	0	1996	—
(France) Bastia	1	0	1997	—
(France) Lyon	1	0	1997	—
(Germany) Werder Bremen	1	0	1998	—
(Italy) Juventus	1	0	1999	—
(England) West Ham United	1	0	1999	—
(Spain) Celta Vigo	1	0	2000	—
(Italy) Udinese	1	0	2000	—
(England) Aston Villa	1	0	2001	—
(France) Paris Saint-Germain	1	0	2001	—
(France) Troyes	1	0	2001	—
(England) Fulham	1	0	2002	—
(Spain) Málaga	1	0	2002	—
(Italy) Perugia	1	0	2003	—
(France) Lens	1	0	2005	—
(France) Marseille	1	0	2005	—
(Portugal) Braga	1	0	2008	—
(Austria) Tirol Innsbruck	0	1	—	1995
(Russia) Rotor Volgograd	0	1	—	1996
(Croatia) Segesta	0	1	—	1996
(Belgium) Standard Liège	0	1	—	1996
(Germany) MSV Duisburg	0	1	—	1997
(Sweden) Halmstads BK	0	1	—	1997
Austria Salzburg	0	1	—	1998
(Poland) Ruch Chorzów	0	1	—	1998
(Serbia) Vojvodina (Note: As a representative of FR Yugoslavia in 1998.)	0	1	—	1998
(France) Metz	0	1	—	1999
(France) Rennes	0	1	—	1999
(Czech Republic) Sigma Olomouc	0	1	—	2000
(Russia) Zenit Saint Petersburg	0	1	—	2000
(Switzerland) Basel	0	1	—	2001
(Italy) Brescia	0	1	—	2001
(Austria) Pasching	0	1	—	2003
(Netherlands) Heerenveen	0	1	—	2003
(Germany) VfL Wolfsburg	0	1	—	2003
(Spain) Atlético Madrid	0	1	—	2004
(Portugal) Leiria	0	1	—	2004
(Czech Republic) Slovan Liberec	0	1	—	2004
(Romania) CFR Cluj	0	1	—	2005
(Spain) Deportivo La Coruña	0	1	—	2005

Performance by nation
Nation	Winners	Runners-up
France	12	5
Germany	8	4
Spain	5	4
Italy	4	2
England	4	1
Portugal	1	1
Denmark	1	0
Austria	0	3
Czech Republic	0	2
Russia	0	2
Belgium	0	1
Croatia	0	1
Netherlands	0	1
Poland	0	1
Romania	0	1
Sweden	0	1
Switzerland	0	1
FR Yugoslavia (Note: The FR Yugoslavia final appearance was by a club from the Republic of Serbia)	0	1

=== Winners by nation ===
Nation	Winners	Runners-up	Winning and group champion clubs	Runner-up and group runners-up clubs
Czechoslovakia	62	34	Slovan Bratislava (8), Banik Ostrava (7), Bohemians Prague (6), Slavia Prague (6), Inter Bratislava (4), Košice (4), Nitra (3), Sparta Prague (3), Spartak Trnava (3), Union Teplice (3), Zbrojovka Brno (3), Jednota Trencin (2), Lokomotiva Kosice (2), DAC Dunajská Streda, Dukla Banská Bystrica, Cheb, Sigma Olomouc, Tatran Prešov, Třinec, Vítkovice, Žilina	Slavia Prague (5), Bohemians Prague (3), Cheb (3), Inter Bratislava (3), Nitra (2), Sigma Olomouc (2), Sparta Prague (2), Spartak Trnava (2), Zbrojovka Brno (2), Žilina (2), DAC Dunajská Streda, Dukla Prague, Jednota Trencin, Košice, Slovan Bratislava, Tatran Prešov, Union Teplice, Vítkovice
Germany	50	46	Eintracht Braunschweig (7), Hamburg (5), Hertha BSC (5), Bayer Uerdingen (4), Werder Bremen (4), Duisburg (3), Fortuna Düsseldorf (3), Hannover 96 (3), Kaiserslautern (3), Karlsruhe (3), Stuttgart (3), Schalke 04 (2), Dynamo Dresden, Eintracht Frankfurt, Nuremberg, SpVgg Fürth, Stuttgarter Kickers	Duisburg (5), Kaiserslautern (5), Werder Bremen (5), Arminia Bielefeld (3), Bayer Leverkusen (3), Hertha BSC (3), Bochum (2), Fortuna Düsseldorf (2), Hannover 96 (2), Karlsruhe (2), Saarbrücken (2), 1860 Münich, Bayer Uerdingen, Borussia Dortmund, Eintracht Braunschweig, Eintracht Frankfurt, Hallescher, Hamburg, Kickers Offenbach, Lokomotive Leipzig, Schalke 04, Stuttgarter Kickers, Wolfsburg
Sweden	46	28	Malmö FF (10), IFK Göteborg (8), Öster (5), AIK (4), Halmstad (3) IFK Norrköping (3), Atvidaberg (2), Elfsborg (2), Hammarby (2), Örebro (2), Brage, Djurgården, GAIS, Örgryte, Trelleborg	Malmö FF (8), Atvidaberg (2), IFK Göteborg (2), IFK Norrköping (2), Kalmar (2), Örgryte (2), Öster (2), Djurgården, Häcken, Halmstad, Hammarby, Helsingborg, Landskrona, Örebro, Trelleborg
Poland	25	27	Pogoń Szczecin (3), Polonia Bytom (3), Wisla Kraków (3), Lech Poznań (2), Odra Opole (2), ROW Rybnik (2), Widzew Łódź (2), Zaglebie Sosnowiec (2), Górnik Zabrze, Katowice, Legia Warsaw, Ruch Chorzów, Szombierki Bytom	Zaglebie Sosnowiec (4), Górnik Zabrze (2), Gwardia Warsaw (2), Katowice (2), Legia Warsaw (2), Polonia Bytom (2), Ruch Chorzów (2), Szombierki Bytom (2), Wisla Kraków (2), Lech Poznań, LKS Łódź, Odra Opole, Pogoń Szczecin, ROW Rybnik, Widzew Łódź, Zawisza Bydgoszcz
Switzerland	22	15	Grasshopper (6), Young Boys (5), Zürich (4), Luzern (2), Neuchâtel Xamax (2), Lausanne Sports, Lugano, Servette	Grasshopper (4), Lausanne Sports (2), Zürich (2), Aarau, Basel, Grenchen, Lugano, Sion, St. Gallen, Young Boys
Denmark	21	30	AGF (3), Lyngby (3), AaB (2), B 1903 (2), Brøndby (2), Frem (2), Odense (2), Copenhagen, Ikast, KB, Næstved, Silkeborg	Odense (7), AGF (4), KB (4), Vejle (4), Brøndby (2), Esbjerg (2), Lyngby (2), Næstved (2), Frem, Hvidovre, Silkeborg
Austria	20	32	Wacker/Tirol Innsbruck (4), Rapid Vienna (3), Salzburg (3), Ried, Sturm Graz, Austria Vienna (2), VÖEST Linz (2), Admira, First Vienna, GAK, Ried, Sturm Graz, Wiener Sportclub	Sturm Graz (5), Wacker/Tirol Innsbruck (5), LASK Linz (4), Admira (3), Austria Vienna (3), First Vienna (3), Salzburg (3), VÖEST Linz (2), Austria Klagenfurt, Pasching, Rapid Vienna, Wiener Sportclub
France	19	9	Marseille (3), Auxerre (2), Lens (2), Lille (2), Bastia, Bordeaux, Guingamp, Lyon, Montpellier, Paris Saint-Germain, Rennes, Saint-Étienne, Strasbourg, Troyes	Auxerre, Bordeaux, Caen, Lille, Metz, Montpellier, RCF Paris, Rennes, Saint-Étienne
East Germany	12	9	Carl Zeiss Jena (3), Chemnitz/Karl-Marx-Stadt (2), Rot-Weiss Erfurt (2), Wismut Aue (2), Empor Rostock, Lokomotive Leipzig, Union Berlin	Lokomotive Leipzig (3), Carl Zeiss Jena (2), Chemnitz/Karl-Marx-Stadt (2), Dynamo Dresden, Magdeburg
Hungary	9	12	Tatabánya (2), Újpest (2), Videoton (2), Békéscsaba, MTK, Siófok	Vác (3), Honvéd (2), Videoton (2), Győr, MTK, Pécs, Siófok, Zalaegerszeg
Netherlands	9	11	Feyenoord (3), Ajax (2), Twente (2), ADO Den Haag, MVV	ADO Den Haag (3), Armsterdam, Feyenoord, Groningen, Heerenveen, NAC Breda, PSV, Twente, Utrecht
Spain	8	5	Villarreal (2), Atlético Madrid, Celta de Vigo, Deportivo La Coruña, Español, Málaga, Valencia	Villarreal (2), Atlético Madrid, Deportivo La Coruña, Valencia
Belgium	7	15	Standard Liège (5), Lierse, Molenbeek	Standard Liège (8), Gent (2), Anderlecht, Beveren, Liège, Molenbeek, Royal Antwerp
Italy	6	3	Bologna, Juventus, Napoli, Perugia, Sampdoria, Udinese	Bologna, Brescia, Padova
England	6	1	Aston Villa (2), Blackburn Rovers, Fulham, Newcastle United, West Ham United	Newcastle United
Israel	5	6	Maccabi Netanya (4), Maccabi Haifa (1)	Maccabi Haifa (2), Bnei Sakhnin, Hapoel Be’er Sheva, Hapoel Tel Aviv, Maccabi Petah Tikva
Portugal	5	6	Belenenses, Braga, CUF, Leiria, Sporting	Vitória Guimarães (2), Belenenses, CUF, Leiria, Vitória Setúbal
Bulgaria	4	13	Etar Veliko Tarnovo, Lokomotiv Gorna Oryahovitsa, Pirin Blagoevgrad, Slavia Sofia	Pirin Blagoevgrad (3), Slavia Sofia (3), Chernomorets Burgas (2), Lokomotiv Sofia (2), Cherno More Varna, Marek Dupnitsa, Spartak Varna
Yugoslavia	4	6	Budućnost, Čelik Zenica, Sloboda Tuzla, Vojvodina	Vojvodina (3), Olimpija Ljubljana, Rad, Sloboda Tuzla
Romania	2	5	Oţelul Galaţi, Vaslui	Rapid Bucureşti (2), CFR Cluj, Farul Constanţa, Gloria Bistriţa
Norway	1	7	Rosenborg	Bryne (2), Lillestrøm (2), Vålerenga (2), Viking
Czech Republic	1	4	Slavia Prague	Sigma Olomouc (2), Slavia Prague, Slovan Liberec
Turkey	1	2	Kayserispor	Sivasspor, Trabzonspor
Slovakia	1	1	Slovan Bratislava	Slovan Bratislava
Cyprus	1		Ethnikos Achna	
Kazakhstan	1		Tobol Kostanay	
Slovenia	1		Maribor	
Russia		5		FC Moscow, Rotor Volgograd, Rubin Kazan, Saturn, Zenit St. Petersburg
Greece		3		Larissa, OFI Crete, Panionios
Ukraine		3		Chornomorets Odesa, Dnipro Dnipropetrovsk, Tavriya Simferopol
Moldova		2		Dacia Chişinău, Tiraspol
Azerbaijan		1		Neftchi Baku
Croatia		1		Segesta
FR Yugoslavia		1		Vojvodina
Latvia		1		Riga
Lithuania		1		Vėtra
Scotland		1		Hibernian
Serbia		1		Hajduk Kula

== See also ==
- List of UEFA Intertoto Cup winning managers
- UEFA club competition records
- UEFA Champions League
- UEFA Cup Winners' Cup
- UEFA Europa League
- UEFA Conference League
- Inter-Cities Fairs Cup
- Mitropa Cup
- Latin Cup
- Balkans Cup
