= Polonia Bytom =

Coordinates: 50°21′27.21″N 18°53′55.38″E

- Full name: Bytomski Sport Polonia Bytom Spółka z o.o.
- Nicknames: Niebiesko-czerwoni (The Blue and Reds); Królowa Śląska (The Queen of Silesia)
- Founded: 4 January 1920; 106 years ago
- Ground: Polonia Bytom Stadium
- Capacity: 2,220
- Chairman: Sławomir Kamiński
- Manager: Konrad Gerega
- League: I liga
- 2025–26: I liga, 10th of 18
- Website: bs.poloniabytom.com.pl
Home colours	Away colours

Polonia Bytom (Polish pronunciation: [pɔˈlɔɲja ˈbɨtɔm]) is a Polish football club based in Bytom. Founded in 1920, the team won two championships, in 1954 and 1962. As of the 2026–27 season, they compete in the I liga, the second tier of Polish football.

== History ==
=== Beginnings ===
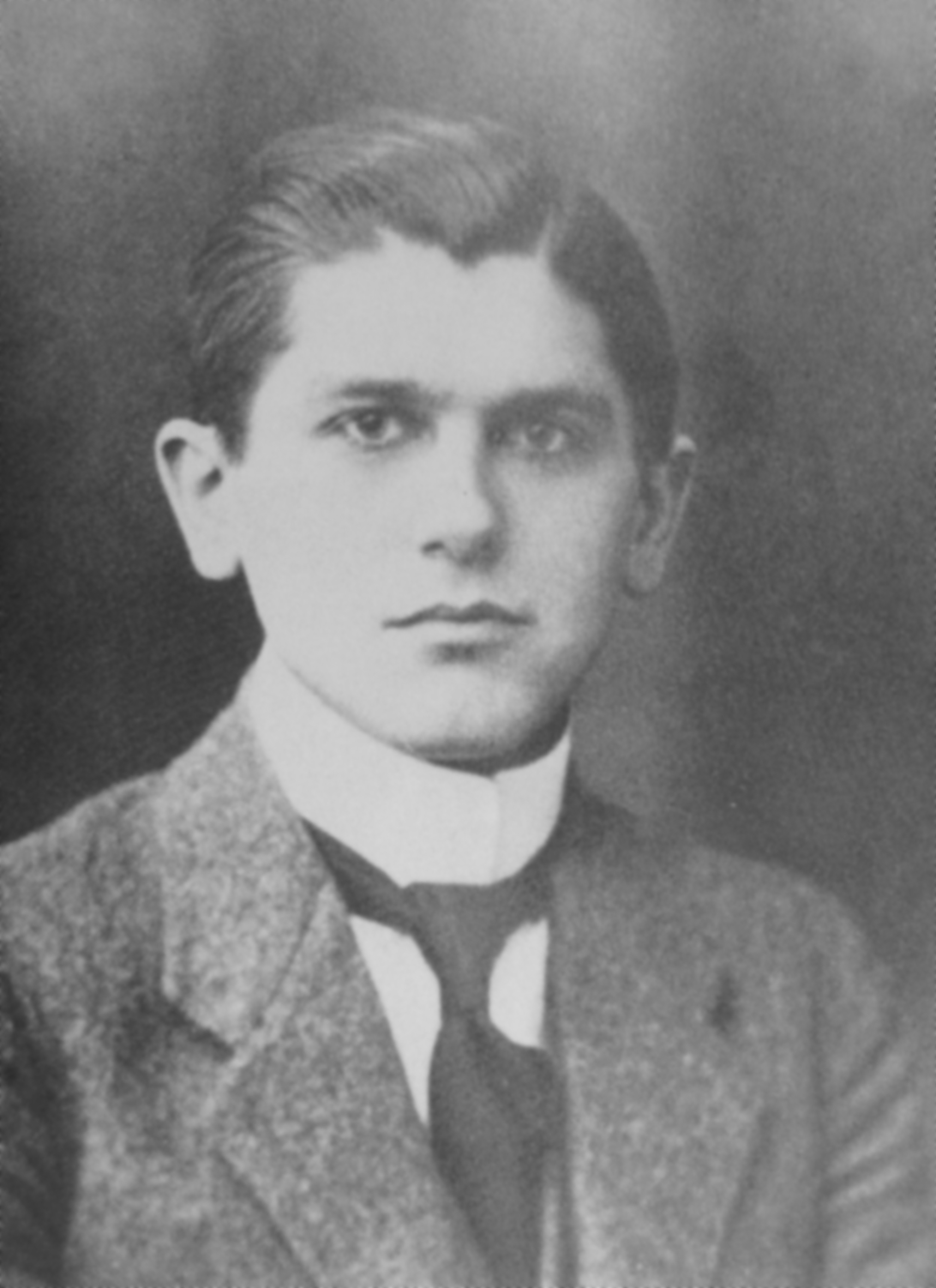
Edmund Grabianowski, co-founder and first chairman of Polonia Bytom

Polonia was founded on 4 January 1920 in the Upper Silesian city of Bytom, during the hectic months of the Silesian Uprisings. In late 1922, however, as a result of the Upper Silesia plebiscite, Bytom remained part of Germany and the club ceased to exist.

In May 1945, numerous players and officials of another Polish club, Pogoń Lwów, arrived in Bytom and decided to revive Polonia. On 17 May 1945, the team played its first game in over two decades, defeating Warta Poznań 3–2.

Polonia is considered the continuation of Pogoń Lwów; its logo is very similar to the logo of Lwów's team as well as their colours, red-blue.

=== 1950s and 1960s ===
Polonia achieved greatest success in the 1950s and 1960s, when it was one of the top teams in Poland. It has won the Polish championship twice, in 1954 and 1962. In 1952, 1958, 1959 and 1961 Polonia Bytom was the vice-champion of Poland. It reached the Polish Cup final in 1964. It performed well in the Intertoto Cup, reaching the final in the 1963–64 season after defeating teams such as Red Star Belgrade, Sampdoria and fellow Polish side Odra Opole. It won the trophy in the 1964–65 season after defeating teams like RC Lens, Schalke 04, Liège and SC Leipzig. Polonia also won the 1965 International Soccer League and finished third in the Polish league in the 1965–66 and 1968–69 seasons.

During that period, Polish international player and goalkeeper Edward Szymkowiak played for Polonia. The club stadium is named after him, and has a capacity of 5,500 spectators.

=== Recent times ===
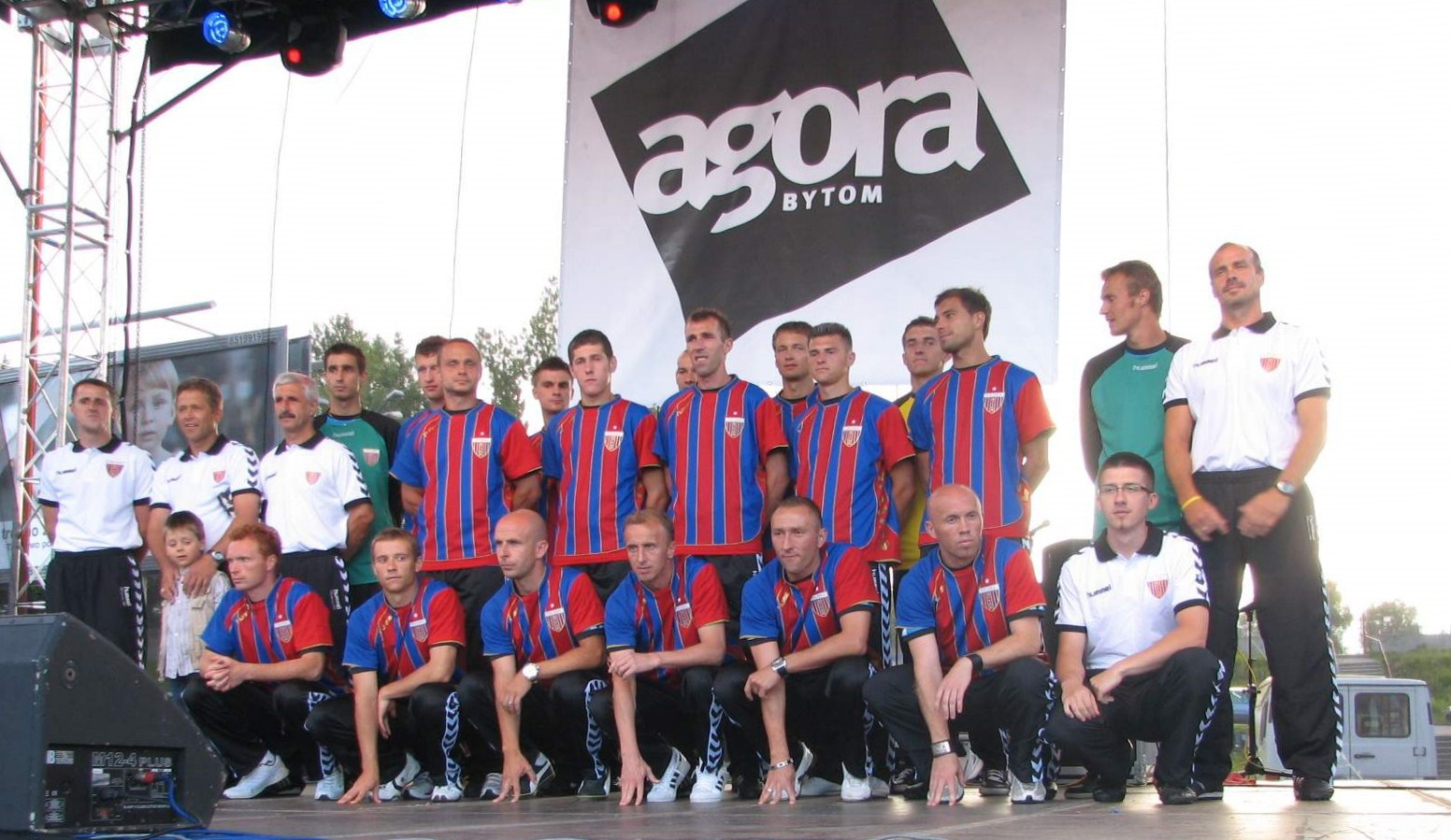
Polonia Bytom team in 2009

In June 2007 Polonia Bytom, after many years, returned to the Polish Ekstraklasa. However, in 2011, the club was relegated to the I liga after finishing bottom of the table with just six wins all season.

== Honours ==
=== Domestic ===
- Ekstraklasa
  - Champions: 1954, 1962
  - Runners-up: 1952, 1958, 1959, 1961
- Polish Cup
  - Runners-up: 1963–64, 1972–73, 1976–77

=== International ===
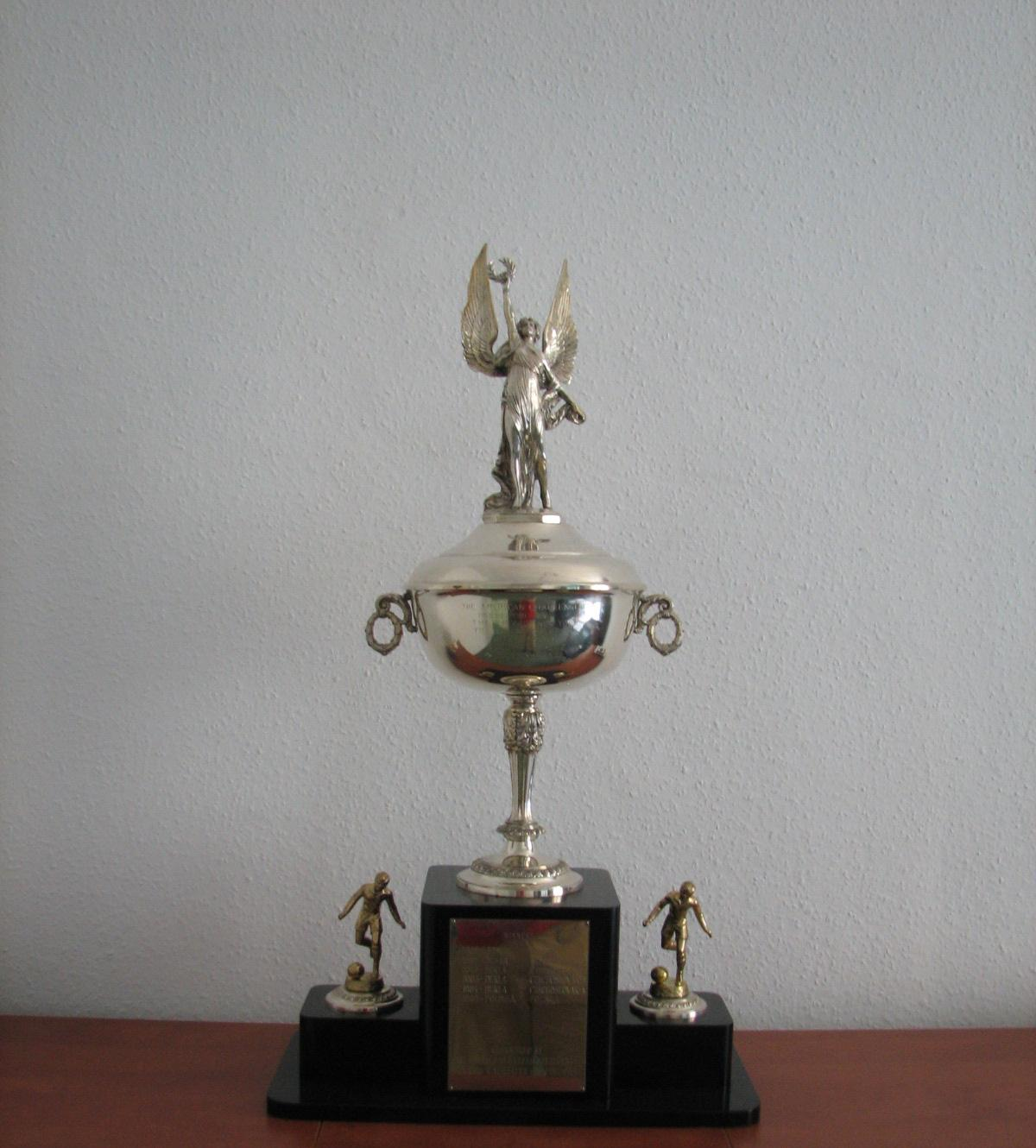
American Challenge Cup won by Polonia in 1965

- International Football Cup (Intertoto Cup)
  - Winners: 1964–65
  - Runners-up: 1963–64
- Intertoto Cup
  - Winners: 1967 (Group B3), 1970 (Group B8)
- International Soccer League
  - Winners: 1965

=== Youth teams ===
- Polish U-19 Championship
  - Champions: 1963, 1970, 1978
  - Runners-up: 1956

== Supporters ==
Polonia Bytom supporters were the first organised fan-club in Poland. They have introduced scarfs, flags and organised chants. Many of the other supporters groups were travelling to Bytom only to watch how Polonia's fans are cheering their club and behaving on the stadium.

The fans have friendships with fans of Arka Gdynia which dates back to 1974, one of the longest friendships in supporter history which has survived to date; with fans of Odra Opole since 1987, Zagłębie Lubin since 2017, Góral Żywiec since 2021 (officially), although they were allied with Góral for much longer than that, and Gryf Wejherowo.

Polonia biggest rivals are local teams Górnik Zabrze, Ruch Radzionków, Ruch Chorzów (The Oldest Silesian Derby) and Szombierki Bytom (Derby of Bytom). The other groups which are not very welcome in Bytom are fans from Zaglebie Sosnowiec, Legia Warszawa and Lechia Gdańsk.

Polonia Bytom's hooligan firm is represented by Młodzi Chuligani Polonii Bytom (MChPB)

== League participations ==
- Ekstraklasa: 1948–1949 (2 seasons), 1951–1955 (5 seasons), 1957–1976 (20 seasons), 1977–1980, 1986–1987, 2007–2011
- I liga: 1950, 1956, 1976–1977, 1980–1986, 1987–2001, 2005–2007, 2011–2013, 2025–present
- II liga: 2001–2005, 2013–2014, 2015–2017, 2023–2025
- III liga: 2014–2015, 2019–2023
- IV liga: 2017–2019

== Players ==
=== Current squad ===
As of 6 September 2026

Note: Flags indicate national team as defined under FIFA eligibility rules; some limited exceptions apply. Players may hold more than one non-FIFA nationality.

No.	Pos.	Nation	Player
1	GK	POL	Wojciech Banasik
4	MF	POL	Adrian Małachowski
5	MF	CRO	Benedik Mioč
6	DF	POL	Maciej Wolski
7	MF	POL	Lucjan Zieliński
8	MF	POL	Mikołaj Łabojko
9	FW	POL	Kamil Wojtyra (captain)
10	MF	POL	Kacper Michalski
11	MF	POL	Konrad Andrzejczak
13	DF	POL	Aleksander Gajgier
14	DF	POL	Grzegorz Szymusik
16	MF	POL	Patryk Stefański
17	MF	POL	Krzysztof Wołkowicz

No.	Pos.	Nation	Player
19	FW	POL	Daniel Rumin
21	MF	POL	Szymon Kądziołka
22	MF	POL	Kamil Orlik
23	FW	POL	Jakub Arak
25	DF	POL	Dominik Konieczny
26	MF	POL	Mateusz Wzięch
29	FW	POL	Dylan Harwin
30	DF	POL	Oskar Krzyżak
33	GK	POL	Filip Zwoliński
40	GK	POL	Klaudiusz Mazur
77	DF	POL	Jakub Szymański
—	MF	COL	César Peña

=== Out on loan ===
Note: Flags indicate national team as defined under FIFA eligibility rules; some limited exceptions apply. Players may hold more than one non-FIFA nationality.

No.	Pos.	Nation	Player
—	GK	POL	Artur Flak (at Victoria Września until 30 June 2027)
—	MF	POL	Łukasz Piontek (at Ruch Radzionków until 30 June 2027)

== Polonia in Europe ==
Season	Competition	Round	Country	Club	Home	Away	Aggregate/Position
1958–59	European Cup	Q	(Hungary)	MTK Budapest	0–3	0–3	0–6
1962–63	European Cup	Q	(Greece)	Panathinaikos	2–1	4–1	6–2
1962–63	European Cup	1R	(Turkey)	Galatasaray	1–4	1–0	2–4
1963–64	International Football Cup	1R	(Italy)	UC Sampdoria	1–1	2–0	3–1
1963–64	International Football Cup	Quarter-final	(Sweden)	Örgryte IS	3–2	7–1	10–3
1963–64	International Football Cup	Semi-final	(Poland)	Odra Opole	2–1	0–0	2–1
1963–64	International Football Cup	Final	(Czechoslovakia)	Slovnaft Bratislava	0–1 (N)		
1964–65	Intertoto Cup	Group C3	(France)	Lens	4–0	1–3	Winner/1st
1964–65	Intertoto Cup	Group C3	(West Germany)	Schalke 04	6–0	0–2	Winner/1st
1964–65	Intertoto Cup	Group C3	(Sweden)	Degerfors IF	6–0	1–1	Winner/1st
1964–65	Intertoto Cup	1R	Bye				
1964–65	Intertoto Cup	Quarter-final	(East Germany)	Karl-Marx-Stadt FC	0–2	4–1	4–3
1964–65	Intertoto Cup	Semi-final	(Belgium)	RFC Liège	0–1	3–1	3–2
1964–65	Intertoto Cup	Final	(East Germany)	Lokomotive Leipzig	0–3	5–1	5–4
1966–67	Intertoto Cup	Group B6	(Sweden)	Norrköping	3–1	1–5	3rd
1966–67	Intertoto Cup	Group B6	(East Germany)	Dynamo Dresden	0–0	1–7	3rd
1966–67	Intertoto Cup	Group B6	(Czechoslovakia)	Spartak Hradec Králové	0–0	0–0	3rd
1967	Intertoto Cup	Group B3	(Sweden)	Elfsborg	3–0	2–1	Winner/1st
1967	Intertoto Cup	Group B3	(West Germany)	Werder Bremen	2–1	0–2	Winner/1st
1967	Intertoto Cup	Group B3	(Switzerland)	Grasshopper	5–1	4–1	Winner/1st
1970	Intertoto Cup	Group B8	(Denmark)	Horsens	2–2	1–1	Winner/1st
1970	Intertoto Cup	Group B8	(West Germany)	Rot-Weiss Essen	3–2	1–1	Winner/1st
1970	Intertoto Cup	Group B8	(Austria)	Tirol Innsbruck	1–0	3–2	Winner/1st
1973	Intertoto Cup	Group 10	(Denmark)	B 1901	6–2	2–0	3rd
1973	Intertoto Cup	Group 10	(Sweden)	Öster	1–2	2–3	3rd
1973	Intertoto Cup	Group 10	(Austria)	Austria Salzburg	4–1	1–7	3rd
1975	Intertoto Cup	Group 5	(Czechoslovakia)	Zbrojovka Brno	1–2	1–2	2nd
1975	Intertoto Cup	Group 5	(Sweden)	AIK	5–1	3–2	2nd
1975	Intertoto Cup	Group 5	(West Germany)	Tennis Borussia Berlin	3–0	1–1	2nd
1980	Intertoto Cup	Group 5	(Czechoslovakia)	Nitra	1–0	0–4	4th
1980	Intertoto Cup	Group 5	(Denmark)	Esbjerg	0–1	2–1	4th
1980	Intertoto Cup	Group 5	(Austria)	LASK Linz	1–1	0–2	4th
