= Jordan Domínguez =

Spanish footballer (born 1995)

Personal information
- Full name: Jordan Domínguez Rajo
- Date of birth: 31 January 1995 (age 31)
- Place of birth: Salvaterra de Miño, Spain
- Height: 1.77 m (5 ft 10 in)
- Position: Attacking midfielder

Team information
- Current team: Céltiga

Youth career
- 2007–2013: Celta Vigo

Senior career*
Years	Team	Apps	(Gls)
2013–2016	Celta B	65	(9)
2016–2017	Toledo	31	(3)
2017–2018	Murcia	19	(1)
2018	HJK	11	(1)
2019	Conquense	3	(0)
2019–2021	Niki Volos	30	(4)
2021–2024	Compostela	75	(8)
2024	Odra Opole	9	(0)
2025	Panargiakos	4	(0)
2025–	Céltiga	6	(0)
- * Club domestic league appearances and goals as of 9 November 2025

Jordan Domínguez Rajo (born 31 January 1995) is a Spanish professional footballer who plays as an attacking midfielder for Tercera Federación club Céltiga.

== Career ==
Born in Salvaterra de Miño, Domínguez joined the youth academy of Celta de Vigo at the age of 12. After progressing through the youth ranks, he was promoted to the reserve team (playing in Segunda División B) in 2013. However, an injury restricted his playing time during the 2013–14 season. At the end of the 2015–16 season, he rejected a contract extension and instead joined fellow league club CD Toledo on 19 July 2016.

On 23 August 2017, Domínguez moved to Real Murcia of the same tier. On 24 September, he made his debut, coming on as a 45th minute substitute for Juanma Bravo in a 1–1 draw against CF Villanovense.

On 3 August 2018, Domínguez moved abroad and joined Finnish club Helsingin Jalkapalloklubi for the remainder of the season. He left the club again at the end of the season.

On 30 January 2019, Domínguez returned to Spain and joined UB Conquense in the third tier.

On 18 June 2024, after stints with Cypriot side Niki Volos and native SD Compostela, Domínguez joined Polish second-tier club Odra Opole on a two-year contract. He and Odra mutually agreed to part ways on 30 December 2024.

On 6 January 2025, Domínguez moved to Super League Greece 2 club Panargiakos.

== Career statistics ==
As of match played on 29 November 2024

Club	Season	League			National cup (Note: Includes Copa del Rey, Greek Cup, Polish Cup)		Other		Total	
Club	Season	Division	Apps	Goals	Apps	Goals	Apps	Goals	Apps	Goals
Celta B	2013–14	Segunda División B	7	0	—		—		7	0
Celta B	2014–15	Segunda División B	34	6	—		—		34	6
Celta B	2015–16	Segunda División B	24	3	—		—		24	3
Celta B	Total		65	9	—		—		65	9
Toledo	2016–17	Segunda División B	31	3	3	0	2 (Note: Appearances in Segunda División B promotion play-offs)	0	36	3
Murcia	2017–18	Segunda División B	19	1	4	0	—		23	1
HJK	2018	Veikkausliiga	11	1	0	0	2 (Note: Appearances in UEFA Europa League)	0	13	1
Conquense	2018–19	Segunda División B	9	0	0	0	—		9	0
Niki Volos	2019–20	Football League	19	2	1	0	—		20	2
Niki Volos	2020–21	Football League	11	2	0	0	—		11	2
Niki Volos	Total		30	4	1	0	—		31	4
Compostela	2021–22	Segunda Federación	23	4	0	0	—		23	4
Compostela	2022–23	Segunda Federación	28	3	0	0	2 (Note: Appearances in Segunda Federación promotion play-offs)	0	30	3
Compostela	2023–24	Segunda Federación	24	1	1	0	—		25	1
Compostela	Total		75	8	1	0	2	0	78	8
Odra Opole	2024–25	I liga	9	0	2	1	—		11	1
Panargiakos	2024–25	Super League Greece 2	0	0	—		—		0	0
Career total			249	26	10	1	6	0	265	27

== Honours ==
HJK

- Veikkausliiga: 2018
