= Henk Bosveld =

Dutch footballer

Charly Bosveld
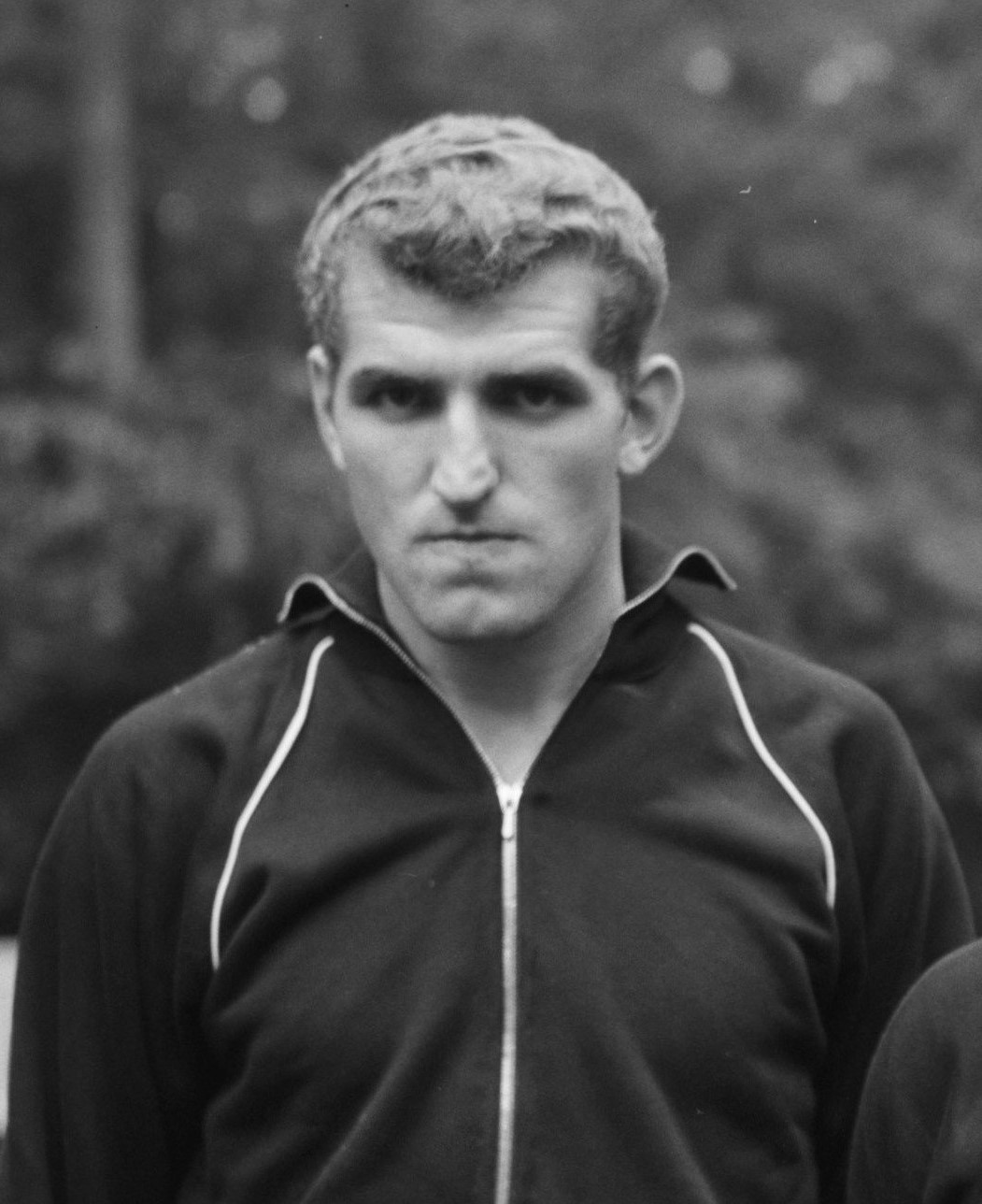
- Henk Bosveld in 1962

Personal information
- Full name: Hendrikus Johannes Bosveld
- Date of birth: 10 July 1941
- Place of birth: Velp, Netherlands
- Date of death: 6 August 1998 (aged 57)
- Place of death: Arnhem, Netherlands
- Position: Midfielder

Youth career
- VVO

Senior career*
Years	Team	Apps	(Gls)
1961–1964	SC Enschede	86	(42)
1964–1968	Sparta	128	(64)
1968–1969	Vitesse	33	(15)
1969–1973	Sparta	94	(31)
1973–1979	Vitesse	191	(58)
Total		532	(210)

International career
1962–1964	Netherlands	2	(0)

Managerial career
- 1986: Vitesse (caretaker)
- VIJDO
- * Club domestic league appearances and goals

Hendrikus ("Henk") Johannes Bosveld (10 July 1941 – 6 August 1998) was a Dutch football midfielder, who was nicknamed Charly after Charles Chaplin due to a similar style of walking.

== Club career ==
Born in Velp, he started playing football at local side VVO and was named best player of Vitesse in the twentieth century. He also played for Sportclub Enschede and left them for Sparta in 1964. He retired from professional football on 12 June 1979.

He later was manager of Arnhem amateur side VIJDO.

== International career ==
Bosveld made his debut for the Netherlands in an October 1962 friendly match against Belgium. He won his second and final cap in an April 1964 friendly against Austria.

== Death and legacy ==
He died in 1998 in Arnhem from a myocardial infarction, aged 57. The East Stand at Vitesse's GelreDome was named in his honour in 2016.

Sporting positions
Preceded by (Netherlands) Clemens Westerhof	Vitesse Arnhem Manager alongside (Poland) Janusz Kowalik; 1985 – 1986	Succeeded by (Netherlands) Hans Dorjee
