= Adrian Purzycki =

Polish footballer

Personal information
- Full name: Adrian Purzycki
- Date of birth: 2 August 1997 (age 29)
- Place of birth: Siedlce, Poland
- Height: 1.83 m (6 ft 0 in)
- Position: Defensive midfielder

Team information
- Current team: PSIM Yogyakarta
- Number: 13

Youth career
- Bedford Town
- 2008–2010: Swansea City
- 2010–2012: Polonia Warsaw
- 2013–2016: Wigan Athletic

Senior career*
Years	Team	Apps	(Gls)
2016–2017	Fortuna Sittard	10	(0)
2017–2021	Miedź Legnica	80	(2)
2021–2022	Górnik Polkowice	32	(2)
2022–2023	Arka Gdynia	16	(0)
2023–2026	Odra Opole	82	(10)
2026–	PSIM Yogyakarta	1	(1)

International career
2014–2015	Poland U18	6	(0)
2015–2016	Poland U19	10	(0)
2016	Poland U20	1	(0)
- * Club domestic league appearances and goals as of 5 September 2026

Adrian Purzycki (born 2 August 1997 in Siedlce) is a Polish professional footballer who plays as a defensive midfielder for Super League club PSIM Yogyakarta. He holds Polish as well as UK citizenship.

== Club career ==
=== Wigan Athletic U18 ===
Purzycki began his career in the youth ranks of Wigan Athletic in 2013.

=== Fortuna Sittard ===
He made his professional debut in the Eerste Divisie for Fortuna Sittard on 5 August 2016 in a game against Achilles '29.

=== Miedź Legnica ===
In 2017, Purzycki joined Miedź Legnica, a Polish I liga football team.

== International career ==
Purzycki has represented Poland at various youth levels since his debut for the Poland U18 in 2014.

== Honours ==
Miedź Legnica

- I liga: 2017–18
