= 1963–64 International Football Cup =

Tournament details
- Teams: 48

Final positions
- Champions: (Czechoslovakia) Slovnaft Bratislava (2nd title)
- Runners-up: (Poland) Polonia Bytom

The 1963–64 International Football Cup was won by Slovnaft Bratislava who retained the trophy they had won the previous season, defeating Polonia Bytom in the final. The tournament was expanded for this season, with 48 clubs entering compared to 32 in previous years, including the first clubs from Belgium to play in the Intertoto Cup - this meant an additional knock-out round was added between the Group Stage and the Quarter-Finals.

== Teams location ==
Location of teams of the 1963–64 Intertoto Cup group stage.
Brown: Group A1; Green: Group A2; Deep Pink: Group A3; Yellow: Group A4;
Red: Group B1; Cyan: Group B2; Blue: Group B3; Purple: Group B4;
Pink: Group C1; Turquoise: Group C2; Spring Green: Group C3; Orange: Group C4.

== Group stage ==
The teams were divided into twelve groups of four clubs each. The groups were divided geographically as 'A', for Belgium, France, Italy and Switzerland; 'B' for Austria, the Netherlands, Sweden and West Germany; and 'C' for Czechoslovakia, East Germany, Poland and Yugoslavia. The twelve group winners (shown in bold in the tables below) advanced to the knock-out rounds - where clubs from each of the three zones, 'A' 'B' and 'C', were kept apart.

=== Group A1 ===
| Pos | Team | Pld | W | D | L | GF | GA | GD | Pts | STA | FIO | SED | ZÜR |
|---|---|---|---|---|---|---|---|---|---|---|---|---|---|
| 1 | (Belgium) Standard Liège (A) | 6 | 2 | 3 | 1 | 8 | 8 | 0 | **7** | — | 1–1 | 1–3 | 1–0 |
| 2 | (Italy) Fiorentina | 6 | 2 | 2 | 2 | 8 | 9 | −1 | **6** | 0–1 | — | 5–4 | 1–0 |
| 3 | (France) Sedan | 6 | 2 | 2 | 2 | 12 | 16 | −4 | **6** | 2–2 | 2–0 | — | 1–1 |
| 4 | (Switzerland) Zürich | 6 | 1 | 3 | 2 | 11 | 6 | +5 | **5** | 2–2 | 1–1 | 7–0 | — |

Source: mogiel.net
Rules for classification: 1) Points; 2) Goal difference; 3) Goals scored; 4) Head-to-head points; 5) Away goals scored; 6) Draw.
(A) Advanced to first round

=== Group A2 ===
| Pos | Team | Pld | W | D | L | GF | GA | GD | Pts | SAM | NÎM | ANT | LS |
|---|---|---|---|---|---|---|---|---|---|---|---|---|---|
| 1 | (Italy) Sampdoria (A) | 6 | 4 | 1 | 1 | 13 | 3 | +10 | **9** | — | 0–2 | 5–0 | 5–0 |
| 2 | (France) Nîmes | 6 | 4 | 1 | 1 | 13 | 7 | +6 | **9** | 1–1 | — | 3–2 | 5–1 |
| 3 | (Belgium) Royal Antwerp | 6 | 2 | 0 | 4 | 9 | 14 | −5 | **4** | 0–1 | 3–1 | — | 2–0 |
| 4 | (Switzerland) Lausanne Sports | 6 | 1 | 0 | 5 | 5 | 16 | −11 | **2** | 0–1 | 0–1 | 4–2 | — |

Source: mogiel.net
Rules for classification: 1) Points; 2) Goal difference; 3) Goals scored; 4) Head-to-head points; 5) Away goals scored; 6) Draw.
(A) Advance to a further round

=== Group A3 ===
| Pos | Team | Pld | W | D | L | GF | GA | GD | Pts | MOD | GAN | TOU | YB |
|---|---|---|---|---|---|---|---|---|---|---|---|---|---|
| 1 | (Italy) Modena (A) | 6 | 3 | 2 | 1 | 8 | 6 | +2 | **8** | — | 1–1 | 2–0 | 3–1 |
| 2 | (Belgium) La Gantoise | 6 | 2 | 3 | 1 | 10 | 9 | +1 | **7** | 0–0 | — | 2–1 | 2–0 |
| 3 | (France) Toulouse | 6 | 3 | 0 | 3 | 14 | 10 | +4 | **6** | 3–0 | 5–3 | — | 3–0 |
| 4 | (Switzerland) Young Boys | 6 | 1 | 1 | 4 | 7 | 14 | −7 | **3** | 1–2 | 2–2 | 3–2 | — |

Source: mogiel.net
Rules for classification: 1) Points; 2) Goal difference; 3) Goals scored; 4) Head-to-head points; 5) Away goals scored; 6) Draw.
(A) Advanced to first round

=== Group A4 ===
| Pos | Team | Pld | W | D | L | GF | GA | GD | Pts | ROU | VEN | LIE | CDF |
|---|---|---|---|---|---|---|---|---|---|---|---|---|---|
| 1 | (France) Rouen (A) | 6 | 4 | 0 | 2 | 18 | 13 | +5 | **8** | — | 2–1 | 2–0 | 4–3 |
| 2 | (Italy) Venezia | 6 | 3 | 1 | 2 | 10 | 7 | +3 | **7** | 3–1 | — | 2–0 | 2–1 |
| 3 | (Belgium) Lierse | 6 | 3 | 1 | 2 | 7 | 8 | −1 | **7** | 3–2 | 1–0 | — | 2–1 |
| 4 | (Switzerland) La Chaux-de-Fonds | 6 | 0 | 2 | 4 | 11 | 18 | −7 | **2** | 3–7 | 2–2 | 1–1 | — |

Source: mogiel.net
Rules for classification: 1) Points; 2) Goal difference; 3) Goals scored; 4) Head-to-head points; 5) Away goals scored; 6) Draw.
(A) Advanced to first round

=== Group B1 ===
| Pos | Team | Pld | W | D | L | GF | GA | GD | Pts |
|---|---|---|---|---|---|---|---|---|---|
| 1 | (Austria) Rapid Wien (A) | 6 | 5 | 0 | 1 | 17 | 6 | +11 | **10** |
| 2 | (Netherlands) PSV | 6 | 4 | 0 | 2 | 11 | 10 | +1 | **8** |
| 3 | (West Germany) Neumünster | 6 | 2 | 0 | 4 | 9 | 14 | −5 | **4** |
| 4 | (Sweden) Djurgården | 6 | 1 | 0 | 5 | 6 | 13 | −7 | **2** |

(A) Advanced to first round

=== Group B2 ===
| Pos | Team | Pld | W | D | L | GF | GA | GD | Pts |
|---|---|---|---|---|---|---|---|---|---|
| 1 | (West Germany) Bayern Munich (A) | 6 | 4 | 2 | 0 | 19 | 9 | +10 | **10** |
| 2 | (Austria) First Vienna | 6 | 3 | 1 | 2 | 14 | 11 | +3 | **7** |
| 3 | (Netherlands) Sparta Rotterdam | 6 | 3 | 0 | 3 | 13 | 17 | −4 | **6** |
| 4 | (Sweden) Gothenburg | 6 | 0 | 1 | 5 | 10 | 19 | −9 | **1** |

(A) Advanced to first round
23 June 1963

| Gothenburg (Sweden) | 3-4 | (Netherlands) Sparta Rotterdam |
|---|---|---|
| Bertil Johansson 15' (pen.); Lennart Wallin 40'; Rolf Eklöf 75' | | Cor Adelaar 7'; Béla Bodnár 27'; Piet de Vries 50'; Piet van Miert 60' |

Ullevi, Gothenburg
Attendance: 4,652
Referee: (Sweden) Bertil Lööw

30 June 1963

| Sparta Rotterdam (Netherlands) | 5-1 | (Austria) First Vienna |
|---|---|---|
| Piet van Miert 34', 62', 66', 73', 84' | | Todor Veselinović 67' |

Het Kasteel, Rotterdam
Attendance: 9,501
Referee: (Netherlands) Ad Boogaerts

6 July 1963

| Bayern Munich (Germany) | 6-0 | (Netherlands) Sparta Rotterdam |
|---|---|---|
| Josef Röckenwagner 8', 78'; Rainer Ohlhauser 11', 18'; Karl Schneider 69'; Jakob Drescher 80' |

Grünwalder Stadion, Munich
Attendance: 6,000
Referee: (Germany) Josef Kandlbinder

13 July 1963

| Sparta Rotterdam (Netherlands) | 1-2 | (Germany) Bayern Munich |
|---|---|---|
| Tonny van der Hulst 73' | | Dieter Brenninger 50', 79' |

Het Kasteel, Rotterdam
Attendance: 5,134
Referee: (Netherlands) Leo Horn

20 July 1963

| First Vienna (Austria) | 4-1 | (Netherlands) Sparta Rotterdam |
|---|---|---|
| Erhard Wieger 9'; Erich Schießwald 15'; Johann Lahner 64'; Todor Veselinović 82' | | Eddy van der Graaf 74' |

Hohe Warte Stadium, Vienna
Attendance: 5,000
Referee: (Austria) Taki Wlachojanis

27 July 1963

| Sparta Rotterdam (Netherlands) | 2-1 | (Sweden) Gothenburg |
|---|---|---|
| Cor Adelaar 17'; Eddy van der Graaf 33' | Report | Rolf Eklöf 60' |

Het Kasteel, Rotterdam
Attendance: 4,000
Referee: (Netherlands) Andries van Leeuwen

=== Group B3 ===
| Pos | Team | Pld | W | D | L | GF | GA | GD | Pts |
|---|---|---|---|---|---|---|---|---|---|
| 1 | (Sweden) Örgryte (A) | 6 | 3 | 2 | 1 | 14 | 10 | +4 | **8** |
| 2 | (Austria) Wiener AC | 6 | 3 | 1 | 2 | 7 | 8 | −1 | **7** |
| 3 | (West Germany) Pirmasens | 6 | 3 | 0 | 3 | 19 | 11 | +8 | **6** |
| 4 | (Netherlands) Enschede | 6 | 1 | 1 | 4 | 5 | 16 | −11 | **3** |

(A) Advanced to first round

=== Group B4 ===
| Pos | Team | Pld | W | D | L | GF | GA | GD | Pts |
|---|---|---|---|---|---|---|---|---|---|
| 1 | (Sweden) Norrköping (A) | 6 | 4 | 1 | 1 | 14 | 9 | +5 | **9** |
| 2 | (Netherlands) Ajax | 6 | 3 | 1 | 2 | 17 | 12 | +5 | **7** |
| 3 | (West Germany) Tasmania Berlin | 6 | 1 | 3 | 2 | 11 | 16 | −5 | **5** |
| 4 | (Austria) Schwechat | 6 | 1 | 1 | 4 | 12 | 17 | −5 | **3** |

(A) Advanced to first round

=== Group C1 ===
| Pos | Team | Pld | W | D | L | GF | GA | GD | Pts |
|---|---|---|---|---|---|---|---|---|---|
| 1 | (Czechoslovakia) Slovnaft Bratislava (A) | 6 | 4 | 1 | 1 | 12 | 4 | +8 | **9** |
| 2 | (Socialist Federal Republic of Yugoslavia) Velež Mostar | 6 | 3 | 1 | 2 | 9 | 12 | −3 | **7** |
| 3 | (Poland) Zagłębie Sosnowiec | 6 | 3 | 0 | 3 | 8 | 8 | 0 | **6** |
| 4 | (East Germany) SC Motor Jena | 6 | 1 | 0 | 5 | 3 | 8 | −5 | **2** |

(A) Advanced to first round

The Sosnowiec v Jena match was abandoned after Jena ended up with too few players (due to injuries and sendings-offs), the score at the time was allowed to stand.

=== Group C2 ===
| Pos | Team | Pld | W | D | L | GF | GA | GD | Pts |
|---|---|---|---|---|---|---|---|---|---|
| 1 | (Czechoslovakia) Slovan Bratislava (A) | 6 | 3 | 2 | 1 | 12 | 7 | +5 | **8** |
| 2 | (Poland) Ruch Chorzów | 6 | 3 | 1 | 2 | 12 | 8 | +4 | **7** |
| 3 | (Socialist Federal Republic of Yugoslavia) OFK Belgrade | 6 | 2 | 2 | 2 | 7 | 12 | −5 | **6** |
| 4 | (East Germany) SC Empor Rostock | 6 | 0 | 3 | 3 | 5 | 9 | −4 | **3** |

(A) Advanced to first round

=== Group C3 ===
| Pos | Team | Pld | W | D | L | GF | GA | GD | Pts |
|---|---|---|---|---|---|---|---|---|---|
| 1 | (Poland) Polonia Bytom (A) | 6 | 2 | 3 | 1 | 17 | 10 | +7 | **7** |
| 2 | (Socialist Federal Republic of Yugoslavia) Red Star Belgrade | 6 | 3 | 1 | 2 | 15 | 15 | 0 | **7** |
| 3 | (East Germany) ASK Vorwärts Berlin | 6 | 1 | 3 | 2 | 10 | 9 | +1 | **5** |
| 4 | (Czechoslovakia) Jednota Trenčín | 6 | 2 | 1 | 3 | 7 | 15 | −8 | **5** |

(A) Advanced to first round

=== Group C4 ===
| Pos | Team | Pld | W | D | L | GF | GA | GD | Pts |
|---|---|---|---|---|---|---|---|---|---|
| 1 | (Poland) Odra Opole (A) | 6 | 3 | 2 | 1 | 8 | 3 | +5 | **8** |
| 2 | (Czechoslovakia) SONP Kladno | 6 | 3 | 1 | 2 | 7 | 8 | −1 | **7** |
| 3 | (Socialist Federal Republic of Yugoslavia) Hajduk Split | 6 | 3 | 0 | 3 | 7 | 8 | −1 | **6** |
| 4 | (East Germany) BSG Motor Zwickau | 6 | 1 | 1 | 4 | 6 | 9 | −3 | **3** |

(A) Advanced to first round

== First round ==
- The best two losing teams also qualified for the Quarter-finals - they were Modena (3–4) and Örgryte (1–2).

| Team 1 | Agg. | Team 2 | 1st leg | 2nd leg |
|---|---|---|---|---|
| Odra Opole (Poland) | 5–2 | (Sweden) Norrköping | 3–2 | 2–0 |
| Rapid Wien (Austria) | 0–3^{1} | (Belgium) Standard Liège | 0–1 | 0–2 |
| FC Bayern Munich (West Germany) | 4–7 | (France) Rouen | 2–3 | 2–4 |
| Slovnaft Bratislava (Czechoslovakia) | 4–3 | (Italy) Modena | 4–1 | 0–2 |
| Örgryte (Sweden) | 1–2 | (Czechoslovakia) Slovan Bratislava | 0–1 | 1–1 |
| Polonia Bytom (Poland) | 3–1 | (Italy) Sampdoria | 1–1 | 2–0 |

== Quarter-finals ==
| Team 1 | Agg. | Team 2 | 1st leg | 2nd leg |
|---|---|---|---|---|
| Odra Opole (Poland) | 1–1^{1,2} | (Czechoslovakia) Slovan Bratislava | 1–1 | 0–0 |
| Rouen (France) | 6–3^{3} | (Belgium) Standard Liège | 3–0 | 3–3 |
| Polonia Bytom (Poland) | 10–3 | (Sweden) Örgryte | 3–2 | 7–1 |
| Slovnaft Bratislava (Czechoslovakia) | 3–1 | (Italy) Modena | 2–1 | 1–0 |

^{1} Odra Opole progressed to the Semi-finals on a coin toss.

== Semi-finals ==
| Team 1 | Agg. | Team 2 | 1st leg | 2nd leg |
|---|---|---|---|---|
| Polonia Bytom (Poland) | 2–1 | (Poland) Odra Opole | 2–1 | 0–0 |
| Slovnaft Bratislava (Czechoslovakia) | 7–2 | (France) Rouen | 5–0 | 2–2 |

== Final ==
Played over 1 leg, in Vienna (neutral venue).

| Team 1 | Score | Team 2 |
|---|---|---|
| Slovnaft Bratislava (Czechoslovakia) | 1–0 | (Poland) Polonia Bytom |

== See also ==
- 1963–64 European Cup
- 1963–64 UEFA Cup Winners' Cup
- 1963–64 Inter-Cities Fairs Cup
