= 1964–65 Intertoto Cup =

Tournament details
- Teams: 44

Final positions
- Champions: (Poland) Polonia Bytom (1st title)
- Runners-up: (East Germany) Lokomotive Leipzig

The 1964–65 Intertoto Cup was won by Polonia Bytom, losing finalists the previous season, who defeated Lokomotive Leipzig in the final - believed to be the first held over two legs in the tournament's history. A total of 44 clubs participated, down four on the previous season, and clubs from Bulgaria and Greece took part for the first time. The competition was also affected by the decision of UEFA to prevent clubs who were taking part in the European Cup or UEFA Cup Winners' Cup continuing games in other European competitions after the end of the summer break. These clubs had to be given byes through the knock-out rounds until they were eliminated from the UEFA competitions, or withdrawn entirely.

== Group stage ==
The teams were divided into eleven groups of four clubs each, it proving impossible to secure enough club to fill twelve groups. The groups were divided geographically - 'A' for Belgium, the Netherlands, Switzerland and West Germany; 'B' for Austria, Bulgaria, Czechoslovakia, East Germany, Poland, Yugoslavia and one club from Sweden; while 'C' (which had only 3 groups) was for France, Greece and Sweden, as well as one club each from Czechoslovakia, Poland and West Germany, and two from Yugoslavia, to make up the numbers. The eleven group winners (shown in bold in the tables below) advanced to the knock-out rounds.

=== Group A1 ===
Pos	Team	Pld	W	D	L	GF	GA	GD	Pts	HER	FEY	LS	STA
1	(West Germany) Hertha Berlin	6	2	3	1	12	12	0	**7**	—	1–0	4–4	2–1
2	(Netherlands) Feyenoord	6	2	2	2	9	7	+2	**6**	1–1	—	0–2	2–0
3	(Switzerland) Lausanne-Sports	6	1	4	1	14	14	0	**6**	3–3	3–3	—	1–1
4	(Belgium) Standard Liège	6	2	1	3	8	10	−2	**5**	3–1	0–3	3–1	—

Source: mogiel.net
Rules for classification: 1) Points; 2) Goal difference; 3) Goals scored; 4) Head-to-head points; 5) Draw.

=== Group A2 ===
Pos	Team	Pld	W	D	L	GF	GA	GD	Pts	DWS	CDF	EIN	BER
1	(Netherlands) DWS	6	4	0	2	14	6	+8	**8**	—	1–2	4–0	5–0
2	(Switzerland) La Chaux-de-Fonds	6	3	1	2	9	10	−1	**7**	0–1	—	2–1	3–1
3	(West Germany) Eintracht Braunschweig	6	3	1	2	9	10	−1	**7**	2–0	1–1	—	2–1
4	(Belgium) Beringen	6	1	0	5	11	17	−6	**2**	2–3	5–1	2–3	—

Source: mogiel.net
Rules for classification: 1) Points; 2) Goal difference; 3) Goals scored; 4) Head-to-head points; 5) Draw.

=== Group A3 ===
Pos	Team	Pld	W	D	L	GF	GA	GD	Pts	KAI	ENS	BEE	GRE
1	(West Germany) Kaiserslautern	6	4	2	0	8	0	+8	**10**	—	0–0	1–0	3–0
2	(Netherlands) Twente Enschede	6	2	3	1	11	7	+4	**7**	0–2	—	1–1	5–0
3	(Belgium) Beerschot	6	1	4	1	5	5	0	**6**	0–0	2–2	—	1–1
4	(Switzerland) Grenchen	6	0	1	5	3	15	−12	**1**	0–2	2–3	0–1	—

Source: mogiel.net
Rules for classification: 1) Points; 2) Goal difference; 3) Goals scored; 4) Head-to-head points; 5) Draw.

=== Group A4 ===
Pos	Team	Pld	W	D	L	GF	GA	GD	Pts	LIÈ	NAC	YB	SAA
1	(Belgium) Liège	6	4	2	0	10	3	+7	**10**	—	0–0	3–3	3–0
2	(Netherlands) NAC Breda	6	3	2	1	17	8	+9	**8**	0–1	—	6–2	3–0
3	(Switzerland) Young Boys	6	1	2	3	13	21	−8	**4**	0–2	3–6	—	3–2
4	(West Germany) Saarbrücken	6	0	2	4	6	14	−8	**2**	0–1	2–2	2–2	—

Source: mogiel.net
Rules for classification: 1) Points; 2) Goal difference; 3) Goals scored; 4) Head-to-head points; 5) Draw.

=== Group B1 ===
Pos	Team	Pld	W	D	L	GF	GA	GD	Pts
1	(East Germany) SC Leipzig	6	4	1	1	15	10	+5	**9**
2	(Socialist Federal Republic of Yugoslavia) Vojvodina	6	2	2	2	17	15	+2	**6**
3	(Czechoslovakia) Jednota Trenčín	6	3	0	3	14	12	+2	**6**
4	(Austria) First Vienna	6	1	1	4	8	17	−9	**3**

Source: mogiel.net

=== Group B2 ===
Pos	Team	Pld	W	D	L	GF	GA	GD	Pts
1	(East Germany) SC Empor Rostock	6	4	0	2	13	11	+2	**8**
2	(Poland) Gwardia Warsaw	6	3	0	3	14	19	−5	**6**
3	(Sweden) Norrköping	6	2	1	3	12	10	+2	**5**
4	(Socialist Federal Republic of Yugoslavia) Radnički Niš	6	2	1	3	13	12	+1	**5**

Source: mogiel.net

=== Group B3 ===
Pos	Team	Pld	W	D	L	GF	GA	GD	Pts
1	(Poland) Szombierki Bytom	6	4	0	2	13	9	+4	**8**
2	(Czechoslovakia) Košice	6	3	2	1	11	8	+3	**8**
3	(East Germany) ASK Vorwärts Berlin	6	2	1	3	5	9	−4	**5**
4	(Austria) Wiener Sport-Club	6	1	1	4	10	13	−3	**3**

Source: mogiel.net

=== Group B4 ===
Pos	Team	Pld	W	D	L	GF	GA	GD	Pts
1	(East Germany) SC Karl-Marx-Stadt	6	3	2	1	12	6	+6	**8**
2	(Czechoslovakia) Tatran Prešov	6	2	3	1	12	8	+4	**7**
3	(Poland) Odra Opole	6	2	2	2	6	6	0	**6**
4	(Bulgaria) Spartak Pleven	6	0	3	3	6	16	−10	**3**

Source: mogiel.net

=== Group C1 ===
Pos	Team	Pld	W	D	L	GF	GA	GD	Pts
1	(Sweden) Malmö FF	6	4	2	0	18	5	+13	**10**
2	(France) Toulouse FC (1937)	6	3	1	2	15	11	+4	**7**
3	(Socialist Federal Republic of Yugoslavia) NK Dinamo	6	2	1	3	10	12	−2	**5**
4	(Greece) Panionios/Olympiacos (Note: Olympiacos participated in two matches (away to NK Dinamo, home to Toulouse) before withdrawing and their record being taken over by compatriots Panionios.)	6	0	2	4	6	21	−15	**2**

Source: mogiel.net

=== Group C2 ===
Pos	Team	Pld	W	D	L	GF	GA	GD	Pts
1	(Czechoslovakia) Slovnaft Bratislava	6	4	1	1	19	6	+13	**9**
2	(Sweden) AIK	6	3	0	3	11	15	−4	**6**
3	(Socialist Federal Republic of Yugoslavia) Sarajevo	6	2	1	3	11	6	+5	**5**
4	(France) Angers	6	2	0	4	5	19	−14	**4**

Source: mogiel.net

=== Group C3 ===
Pos	Team	Pld	W	D	L	GF	GA	GD	Pts
1	(Poland) Polonia Bytom	6	3	1	2	18	6	+12	**7**
2	(France) Lens	6	3	1	2	15	9	+6	**7**
3	(West Germany) Schalke 04	6	3	1	2	10	12	−2	**7**
4	(Sweden) Degerfors	6	1	1	4	4	20	−16	**3**

Source: mogiel.net

== First round ==
- Byes were given to DWS and Malmö FF and because they were participating in the European Cup, and were not allowed to continue in the Intertoto Cup after the summer break.
- The remaining clubs were drawn into three ties and three byes - the clubs which received byes were Hertha Berlin, Lokomotive Leipzig and Polonia Bytom. This replaced the system used the previous year, of allowing the best losing teams to qualify.

Team 1	Agg.	Team 2	1st leg	2nd leg
Hertha Berlin (West Berlin)	Bye	–	–	–
Kaiserslautern (West Germany)	2–4	(Czechoslovakia) Slovnaft Bratislava	1–1	1–3
Lokomotive Leipzig (East Germany)	Bye	–	–	–
Malmö FF (Sweden)	Bye	–	–	–
Liège (Belgium)	1–0	(Poland) Szombierki Bytom	0–0	1–0
Empor Rostock (East Germany)	1–2	(East Germany) Karl-Marx-Stadt	0–1	1–1
Polonia Bytom (Poland)	Bye	–	–	–

== Quarter-finals ==
- Malmö FF had by this point been eliminated from the European Cup, and so re-entered the tournament; but DWS were still playing, so they were withdrawn.
- As a result, the remaining clubs were drawn into three ties and one bye - the club which received the bye was Liège.

Team 1	Agg.	Team 2	1st leg	2nd leg
Hertha Berlin (West Berlin)	5–2	(Czechoslovakia) Slovnaft Bratislava	5–0	0–2
Lokomotive Leipzig (East Germany)	5–2	(Sweden) Malmö FF	4–1	1–1
Liège (Belgium)	Bye	–	–	–
Karl-Marx-Stadt (East Germany)	3–4	(Poland) Polonia Bytom	2–0	1–4

== Semi-finals ==
Team 1	Agg.	Team 2	1st leg	2nd leg
Hertha Berlin (West Berlin)	1–8	(East Germany) SC Leipzig	1–4	0–4
Liège (Belgium)	2–3	(Poland) Polonia Bytom	1–0	1–3

== Final ==
Team 1	Agg.	Team 2	1st leg	2nd leg
SC Leipzig (East Germany)	4–5	(Poland) Polonia Bytom	3–0	1–5

== See also ==
- 1964–65 European Cup
- 1964–65 UEFA Cup Winners' Cup
- 1964–65 Inter-Cities Fairs Cup
