= 1963–64 in Swiss football =

Football in Switzerland
- Season: 1963–64

Men's football
- Nationalliga A: La Chaux-de-Fonds
- Nationalliga B: Lugano
- 1. Liga: 1. Liga champions: FC Le Locle; Group West: FC Le Locle; Group Cenral: SC Burgdorf; Group South and East: FC Baden
- Swiss Cup: Lausanne-Sport

The following is a summary of the 1963–64 season of competitive football in Switzerland.

== Nationalliga A ==
=== Final league table ===
Pos	Team	Pld	W	D	L	GF	GA	GD	Pts	Qualification
1	La Chaux-de-Fonds	26	17	5	4	68	36	+32	39	Swiss champions, qualified for 1964–65 European Cup and entered 1964–65 Intertoto Cup
2	Zürich	26	18	2	6	84	37	+47	38	
3	Grenchen	26	17	4	5	57	35	+22	38	Entered 1964–65 Intertoto Cup
4	Servette	26	18	0	8	74	33	+41	36	
5	Lausanne-Sport	26	13	4	9	61	52	+9	30	Swiss Cup winners, qualified for 1964–65 European Cup Winners' Cup and entered 1964–65 Intertoto Cup
6	Young Boys	26	11	5	10	56	54	+2	27	Entered 1964–65 Intertoto Cup
7	Basel	26	10	6	10	42	48	−6	26	
8	Luzern	26	10	3	13	44	52	−8	23	
9	Chiasso	26	8	7	11	40	54	−14	23	
10	Sion	26	9	3	14	52	58	−6	21	
11	Grasshopper Club	26	8	3	15	42	64	−22	19	
12	Biel-Bienne	26	8	2	16	52	68	−16	18	
13	Schaffhausen	26	3	7	16	32	69	−37	13	Relegated: to 1964–65 Nationalliga B
14	Cantonal Neuchatel	26	4	5	17	38	82	−44	13	Relegated: 1964–65 Nationalliga B

Source: rsssf.com
Rules for classification: 1) Points; 2) Goal difference within the league, however with play-off for qualifiers;

== Nationalliga B ==
=== Final league table ===
Pos	Team	Pld	W	D	L	GF	GA	GD	Pts	Qualification or relegation
1	Lugano	26	16	5	5	53	26	+27	37	NLB Champions and promoted to 1964–65 Nationalliga A
2	AC Bellinzona	26	15	4	7	44	37	+7	34	Promoted to 1964–65 Nationalliga A
3	FC Thun	26	13	7	6	55	40	+15	33	
4	Urania Genève Sport	26	14	3	9	54	45	+9	31	
5	SC Brühl	26	11	8	7	50	37	+13	30	
6	Young Fellows Zürich	26	11	7	8	52	37	+15	29	
7	FC Solothurn	26	9	8	9	42	31	+11	26	
8	FC Winterthur	26	9	8	9	48	47	+1	26	
9	FC Porrentruy	26	10	6	10	47	52	−5	26	
10	FC Aarau	26	7	7	12	45	49	−4	21	
11	FC Bern	26	8	5	13	40	53	−13	21	
12	FC Moutier	26	8	4	14	34	54	−20	20	
13	Etoile Carouge FC	26	5	9	12	38	49	−11	19	Relegated to 1964–65 1. Liga
14	Vevey Sports	26	3	5	18	23	68	−45	11	Relegated to 1964–65 1. Liga

Source: rsssf.com
Rules for classification: 1) Points; 2) Goal difference within the league, however with play-off for qualifiers;

== 1. Liga ==
=== Group West ===
Pos	Team	Pld	W	D	L	GF	GA	GD	Pts	Qualification or relegation
1	FC Le Locle	24	17	5	2	51	19	+32	39	Play-off to Nationalliga B
2	FC Fribourg	24	15	3	6	47	25	+22	33	
3	FC Raron	24	10	8	6	23	26	−3	28	
4	Yverdon-Sport FC	24	10	6	8	54	36	+18	26	
5	FC Xamax	24	11	4	9	43	33	+10	26	
6	ES FC Malley	24	7	11	6	32	31	+1	25	
7	FC Versoix	24	8	6	10	35	36	−1	22	
8	FC Forward Morges	24	6	8	10	29	36	−7	20	
9	FC Stade Lausanne	24	6	8	10	35	46	−11	20	
10	FC Renens	24	8	4	12	31	43	−12	20	
11	FC Martigny-Sports	24	9	2	13	25	41	−16	20	
12	FC Hauterive	24	7	3	14	39	48	−9	17	Relegation to 2. Liga Interregional
13	FC Assens	24	4	8	12	23	47	−24	16	Relegation to 2. Liga Interregional

Source: RSSSF
Rules for classification: 1) Points; 2) Goal difference within the league, but decider play-off for qualifiers.

=== Group Central ===
Pos	Team	Pld	W	D	L	GF	GA	GD	Pts	Qualification or relegation
1	SC Burgdorf	24	16	4	4	55	25	+30	36	Play-off to Nationalliga B
2	FC Concordia Basel	24	16	3	5	54	29	+25	35	
3	SR Delémont	24	12	4	8	48	45	+3	28	
4	FC Alle	24	9	7	8	35	34	+1	25	
5	FC Emmenbrücke	24	9	6	9	43	39	+4	24	
6	FC Nordstern Basel	24	10	4	10	47	44	+3	24	
7	FC Olten	24	9	6	9	43	41	+2	24	
8	FC Minerva Bern	24	7	8	9	41	41	0	22	
9	FC Langenthal	24	9	4	11	55	56	−1	22	
10	FC Wohlen	24	9	4	11	37	46	−9	22	
11	FC Gerlafingen	24	8	5	11	35	46	−11	21	
12	FC Kickers Luzern	24	7	4	13	35	52	−17	18	Relegation to 2. Liga Interregional
13	BSC Old Boys	24	4	3	17	26	56	−30	11	Relegation to 2. Liga Interregional

Source: RSSSF
Rules for classification: 1) Points; 2) Goal difference within the league, but decider play-off for qualifiers.

=== Group South and East ===
Pos	Team	Pld	W	D	L	GF	GA	GD	Pts	Qualification or relegation
1	FC Baden	24	14	7	3	61	28	+33	35	To decider for first place
2	FC Blue Stars Zürich	24	15	5	4	48	21	+27	35	To decider for first place
3	FC Red Star Zürich	24	11	6	7	45	39	+6	28	
4	FC Vaduz	24	12	2	10	46	40	+6	26	
5	FC Bodio	24	10	6	8	25	24	+1	26	
6	FC St. Gallen	24	11	3	10	54	42	+12	25	
7	FC Locarno	24	9	7	8	32	31	+1	25	
8	FC Wettingen	24	10	4	10	50	29	+21	24	
9	FC Oerlikon/Polizei ZH	24	8	5	11	33	46	−13	21	
10	FC Widnau	24	7	6	11	31	45	−14	20	
11	FC Dietikon	24	7	6	11	29	44	−15	20	
12	FC Küsnacht	24	7	4	13	31	48	−17	18	Relegation to 2. Liga Interregional
13	FC Rapid Lugano	24	2	5	17	23	71	−48	9	Relegation to 2. Liga Interregional

Source: RSSSF
Rules for classification: 1) Points; 2) Goal difference within the league, but decider play-off for qualifiers.

==== Decider for first place ====
The decider match for the group championship was played on 20 June at Stadion Brügglifeld in Aarau.

Team 1	Score	Team 2
FC Baden	3–2	Blue Stars

FC Baden won and advanced to play-offs. Blue Stars remained in the division.

=== Promotion play-off ===
The three group winners played single a round-robin for the two promotion slots and for the championship.

==== Round-robin ====
Pos	Team	Pld	W	D	L	GF	GA	GD	Pts	Qualification	LeL	BUR	BAD
1	Le Locle	2	2	0	0	7	2	+5	4	1. Liga champions, promoted to 1964–65 Nationalliga B	—	—	5–2
2	Burgdorf	2	0	1	1	3	5	−2	1	To decider for second place	0–2	—	—
3	Baden	2	0	1	1	5	8	−3	1	To decider for second place	—	3–3	—

Source: RSSSF
Rules for classification: 1) Points; 2) Head-to-head 3) Decider.

FC Le Locle were declaired 1. Liga champions and were promoted to 1964–65 Nationalliga B.

==== Decider for second place ====
The decider match for second place was played on 12 July 1964 in Olten.

Team 1	Score	Team 2
Burgdorf	1–3	Baden

Baden won and were promoted to 1964–65 Nationalliga B. Burgdorf remained in the division.

== Swiss Cup ==
The competition was played in a knockout system. In the case of a draw, extra time was played. If the teams were still level after extra time, the match was replayed at the away team's ground. In the replay, in case of a draw after extra time, a toss of the coin would decide which team progressed.

=== Early rounds ===
The routes of the finalists to the final were:

- Second round: teams from the NLA and NLB with byes.
- Third round: Lausanne-Visp 10:3. Alle-ChdF 0:2.
- Fourth round: Urania-Lausanne 0:1. ChdF-Cantonal 4:0.
- Fifth round: Chiasso-Lausanne 1:7 (a.e.t.). ChdF-Biel 3:2.
- Quarter-finals: Zürich-Lausanne 1:2. ChdF-YB 5:1.
- Semi-finals. Lausanne-Pruntrut 6:0. ChdF-GC 3:0.

=== Final ===
The final was held in the former Wankdorf Stadium on Easter Monday 1964.

30 March 1964

Lausanne-Sport	2–0	La Chaux-de-Fonds
Eschmann 25'; Gottardi 88'	Fussball Schweiz

Wankdorf Stadium, Bern
Attendance: 51,000
Referee: (Switzerland) Josef Heymann (Arlesheim)

Best crowd attendance at a Swiss Cup final to this date

Lausanne-Sport won the cup and this was the club's sixth cup title to this date.

== Swiss Clubs in Europe ==
- Zürich as 1962–63 Nationalliga A champions: 1963–64 European Cup and entered 1963–64 Intertoto Cup
- Basel as 1962–63 Swiss Cup winners: 1963–64 European Cup Winners' Cup
- Lausanne-Sport: entered 1963–64 Intertoto Cup
- La Chaux-de-Fonds: entered 1963–64 Intertoto Cup
- Young Boys: entered 1963–64 Intertoto Cup

=== Zürich ===
==== European Cup ====
===== Preliminary round =====
11 September 1963 First leg	Dundalk (Republic of Ireland)	0–3	(Switzerland) Zürich	Dalymount Park, Dublin
22:00 CET		Report	Feller 15'; Von Burg 58', 68'	Attendance: 17,052; Referee: Manuel Gómez Arribas (Spain)

25 September 1963 Second leg	Zürich (Switzerland)	1–2	(Republic of Ireland) Dundalk	Letzigrund, Zürich
	Feller 79'	Report	Cross 20'; Hasty 60'	Attendance: 14,500; Referee: José María Ortiz (Spain)

Zürich won 4–2 on aggregate.

===== First round =====
14 November 1963 First leg	Zürich (Switzerland)	2–0	(Turkey) Galatasaray	Letzigrund, Zürich
20:00 CET	Martinelli 20'; Stürmer 83'	Report		Attendance: 24,000; Referee: Tage Sørensen (Denmark)

27 November 1963 Second leg	Galatasaray (Turkey)	2–0	(Switzerland) Zürich	Mecidiyeköy Stadı, Istanbul
13:30 CET	Oktay 9' (pen.), 50' (pen.)	Report		Attendance: 22,987; Referee: Kostadin Dinov (Bulgaria)

Zürich 2–2 Galatasaray on aggregate; play-off needed.

===== Play-off =====
11 December 1963	Zürich (Switzerland)	2–2; Decided by a coin flip. (a.e.t.)	(Turkey) Galatasaray	Stadio Flaminio, Rome
14:30 CET	Von Burg 77'; Leimgruber 118'	Report	Oktay 85', 92'	Attendance: 602; Referee: Giuseppe Adami (Italy)

Zürich 2–2 Galatasaray in play-off match. Zürich qualified on a coin toss.

===== Quarter-finals =====
4 March 1964 First leg	PSV Eindhoven (Netherlands)	1–0	(Switzerland) Zürich	Philips Sportpark, Eindhoven
	Theunissen 85'	Report		Attendance: 8,589; Referee: Arthur Holland (England)

11 March 1964 Second leg	Zürich (Switzerland)	3–1	(Netherlands) PSV Eindhoven	Letzigrund, Zürich
	Stürmer 2'; Brizzi 18'; Rüfli 56'	Report	Verdonk 35'	Attendance: 15,452; Referee: Juan Gardeazábal (Spain)

Zürich won 3–2 on aggregate.

===== Semi-finals =====
22 April 1964 First leg	Zürich (Switzerland)	1–2	(Spain) Real Madrid	Letzigrund, Zürich
20:00 CET	Brizzi 71'	Report	Di Stéfano 16'; Felo 25'	Attendance: 28,394; Referee: Joseph Hannet (Belgium)

7 May 1964 First leg	Real Madrid (Spain)	6–0	(Switzerland) Zürich	Santiago Bernabéu, Madrid
20:00 CET	Zoco 9'; Felo 14'; Muller 16'; Puskás 70'; Di Stéfano 79'; Amancio 87'	Report		Attendance: 110,000; Referee: Jean Tricot (France)

Real Madrid won 8–1 on aggregate.

==== Intertoto Cup ====
===== Group A1 =====
Pos	Team	Pld	W	D	L	GF	GA	GD	Pts	STA	FIO	SED	ZÜR
1	(Belgium) Standard Liège (A)	6	2	3	1	8	8	0	7	—	1–1	1–3	1–0
2	(Italy) Fiorentina	6	2	2	2	8	9	−1	6	0–1	—	5–4	1–0
3	(France) Sedan	6	2	2	2	12	16	−4	6	2–2	2–0	—	1–1
4	(Switzerland) Zürich	6	1	3	2	11	6	+5	5	2–2	1–1	7–0	—

Source: mogiel.net
Rules for classification: 1) Points; 2) Goal difference; 3) Goals scored; 4) Head-to-head points; 5) Away goals scored; 6) Draw.
(A) Advance to a further round

=== Basel ===
==== European Cup Winners' Cup ====
===== First round =====
17 September 1963 First leg	FC Basel (Switzerland)	1 – 5	(Scotland) Celtic	St. Jakob Stadium, Basel
19:45	Blumer 78'	Summary	21' Divers; 43', 65', 77' Hughes; 53' Lennox	Attendance: 15,500; Referee: (Spain) Manuel Gómez Arribas

9 October 1963 Second leg	Celtic (Scotland)	5 – 0	(Switzerland) FC Basel	Celtic Park, Glasgow
19:30	Johnstone 3'; Divers 42', 88'; Murdoch 62'; Chalmers 78'	Summary		Attendance: 7,909; Referee: (Denmark) Frede Hansen

Celtic won 10 – 1 on aggregate.

=== Lausanne-Sport ===
==== Intertoto Cup ====
===== Group A2 =====
Pos	Team	Pld	W	D	L	GF	GA	GD	Pts	SAM	NÎM	ANT	LS
1	(Italy) Sampdoria (A)	6	4	1	1	13	3	+10	9	—	0–2	5–0	5–0
2	(France) Nîmes	6	4	1	1	13	7	+6	9	1–1	—	3–2	5–1
3	(Belgium) Royal Antwerp	6	2	0	4	9	14	−5	4	0–1	3–1	—	2–0
4	(Switzerland) Lausanne-Sports	6	1	0	5	5	16	−11	2	0–1	0–1	4–2	—

Source: mogiel.net
Rules for classification: 1) Points; 2) Goal difference; 3) Goals scored; 4) Head-to-head points; 5) Away goals scored; 6) Draw.
(A) Advanced to first round

=== La Chaux-de-Fonds ===
==== Intertoto Cup ====
===== Group A4 =====
Pos	Team	Pld	W	D	L	GF	GA	GD	Pts	ROU	VEN	LIE	CDF
1	(France) Rouen (A)	6	4	0	2	18	13	+5	8	—	2–1	2–0	4–3
2	(Italy) Venezia	6	3	1	2	10	7	+3	7	3–1	—	2–0	2–1
3	(Belgium) Lierse	6	3	1	2	7	8	−1	7	3–2	1–0	—	2–1
4	(Switzerland) La Chaux-de-Fonds	6	0	2	4	11	18	−7	2	3–7	2–2	1–1	—

Source: mogiel.net
Rules for classification: 1) Points; 2) Goal difference; 3) Goals scored; 4) Head-to-head points; 5) Away goals scored; 6) Draw.
(A) Advanced to first round

=== Young Boys ===
==== Intertoto Cup ====
===== Group A3 =====
Pos	Team	Pld	W	D	L	GF	GA	GD	Pts	MOD	GAN	TOU	YB
1	(Italy) Modena (A)	6	3	2	1	8	6	+2	8	—	1–1	2–0	3–1
2	(Belgium) La Gantoise	6	2	3	1	10	9	+1	7	0–0	—	2–1	2–0
3	(France) Toulouse	6	3	0	3	14	10	+4	6	3–0	5–3	—	3–0
4	(Switzerland) Young Boys	6	1	1	4	7	14	−7	3	1–2	2–2	3–2	—

Source: mogiel.net
Rules for classification: 1) Points; 2) Goal difference; 3) Goals scored; 4) Head-to-head points; 5) Away goals scored; 6) Draw.
(A) Advanced to first round

== Sources ==
- Switzerland 1963–64 at RSSSF
- European Competitions 1963–64 at RSSSF.com
- Cup finals at Fussball-Schweiz
- Intertoto history at Pawel Mogielnicki's Page
- Josef Zindel (2018). FC Basel 1893. Die ersten 125 Jahre (in German). Basel: Friedrich Reinhardt Verlag. ISBN 978-3-7245-2305-5.

Preceded by 1962–63	Seasons in Swiss football	Succeeded by 1964–65
