= 1962–63 in Swiss football =

Football in Switzerland
- Season: 1962–63

Men's football
- Nationalliga A: Zürich
- Nationalliga B: Lugano
- 1. Liga: 1. Liga champions: FC Solothurn; Group West: Etoile Carouge; Group Cenral: FC Solothurn; Group South and East: FC Locarno
- Swiss Cup: Basel

The following is a summary of the 1962–63 season of competitive football in Switzerland.

== Nationalliga A ==
=== Final league table ===
Pos	Team	Pld	W	D	L	GF	GA	GD	Pts	Qualification or relegation
1	Zürich	26	20	4	2	81	33	+48	44	Swiss Champions qualified for 1963–64 European Cup and entered 1963–64 Intertoto Cup
2	Lausanne-Sport	26	18	4	4	81	30	+51	40	Entered 1963–64 Intertoto Cup
3	La Chaux-de-Fonds	26	12	8	6	55	44	+11	32	Entered 1963–64 Intertoto Cup
4	Young Boys	26	13	5	8	62	49	+13	31	Entered 1963–64 Intertoto Cup
5	Servette	26	11	4	11	54	39	+15	26	
6	Basel	26	10	6	10	59	51	+8	26	Swiss Cup winners qualified for 1963–64 European Cup Winners' Cup
7	Grasshopper Club	26	9	7	10	57	51	+6	25	
8	Biel-Bienne	26	9	6	11	38	44	−6	24	
9	Grenchen	26	8	7	11	40	49	−9	23	
10	Luzern	26	7	9	10	41	54	−13	23	
11	Chiasso	26	7	6	13	33	69	−36	20	
12	Sion	26	6	7	13	37	69	−32	19	
13	Young Fellows Zürich	26	7	3	16	34	58	−24	17	Relegated to 1963–64 Nationalliga B
14	Lugano	26	4	6	16	21	53	−32	14	Relegated to 1963–64 Nationalliga B

Source: rsssf.com
Rules for classification: 1) Points; 2) Goal difference within the league, however with play-off for qualifiers;

== Nationalliga B ==
=== Final league table ===
Pos	Team	Pld	W	D	L	GF	GA	GD	Pts	Qualification or relegation
1	FC Schaffhausen	26	14	7	5	55	31	+24	35	NLB Champions and promoted to 1963–64 Nationalliga A
2	FC Cantonal Neuchâtel	26	13	5	8	52	39	+13	31	Promoted to 1963–64 Nationalliga A
3	FC Winterthur	26	12	4	10	53	37	+16	28	
4	AC Bellinzona	26	9	10	7	41	33	+8	28	
5	SC Brühl	26	11	5	10	51	46	+5	27	
6	Urania Genève Sport	26	9	9	8	40	37	+3	27	
7	FC Thun	26	11	5	10	51	50	+1	27	
8	Vevey Sports	26	11	4	11	47	46	+1	26	
9	FC Porrentruy	26	11	3	12	46	57	−11	25	
10	FC Aarau	26	8	8	10	46	49	−3	24	
11	FC Bern	26	9	6	11	37	41	−4	24	
12	FC Moutier	26	9	6	11	31	51	−20	24	
13	FC Bodio	26	8	6	12	22	41	−19	22	Relegated to 1963–64 1. Liga
14	FC Fribourg	26	6	4	16	41	55	−14	16	Relegated to 1963–64 1. Liga

Source: rsssf.com
Rules for classification: 1) Points; 2) Goal difference within the league, however with play-off for qualifiers;

== 1. Liga ==
=== Group West ===
Pos	Team	Pld	W	D	L	GF	GA	GD	Pts	Qualification or relegation
1	Etoile Carouge FC	24	15	5	4	60	34	+26	35	To decider for first place
2	FC Versoix	24	15	5	4	47	23	+24	35	To decider for first place
3	FC Xamax	24	12	7	5	54	33	+21	31	
4	FC Le Locle	24	11	8	5	56	31	+25	30	
5	Yverdon-Sport FC	24	12	5	7	58	30	+28	29	
6	FC Stade Lausanne	24	10	8	6	38	32	+6	28	
7	ES FC Malley	24	9	6	9	38	43	−5	24	
8	FC Raron	24	9	3	12	35	36	−1	21	
9	FC Renens	24	6	6	12	23	47	−24	18	
10	FC Martigny-Sports	24	3	11	10	24	33	−9	17	
11	FC Forward Morges	24	5	7	12	23	43	−20	17	
12	FC Monthey	24	5	6	13	28	58	−30	16	Relegation to 2. Liga Interregional
13	FC Sierre	24	2	7	15	33	74	−41	11	Relegation to 2. Liga Interregional

Source: RSSSF
Rules for classification: 1) Points; 2) Goal difference within the league, but decider play-off for qualifiers.

==== Decider for first place ====
The decider match for the group winners was played on 22 June at Stade de Frontenex in Genève.

Team 1	Score	Team 2
Etoile Carouge	1–0	Versoix

Etoile Carouge won and advanced to play-offs. Versoix remained in the division.

=== Group Central ===
Pos	Team	Pld	W	D	L	GF	GA	GD	Pts	Qualification or relegation
1	FC Solothurn	24	15	8	1	57	24	+33	38	Play-off to Nationalliga B
2	FC Concordia Basel	24	10	8	6	55	40	+15	28	
3	SR Delémont	24	12	4	8	41	30	+11	28	
4	FC Emmenbrücke	24	11	5	8	60	43	+17	27	
5	FC Alle	24	11	5	8	39	37	+2	27	
6	FC Gerlafingen	24	11	5	8	37	36	+1	27	
7	BSC Old Boys	24	8	9	7	33	33	0	25	
8	FC Langenthal	24	8	8	8	49	45	+4	24	
9	SC Burgdorf	24	7	8	9	42	44	−2	22	
10	FC Nordstern Basel	24	7	7	10	46	49	−3	21	
11	FC Wohlen	24	7	6	11	29	46	−17	20	
12	FC Breite Basel	24	4	10	10	36	38	−2	18	Relegation to 2. Liga Interregional
13	FC Lengnau	24	3	1	20	23	82	−59	7	Relegation to 2. Liga Interregional

Source: RSSSF
Rules for classification: 1) Points; 2) Goal difference within the league, but decider play-off for qualifiers.

=== Group South and East ===
Pos	Team	Pld	W	D	L	GF	GA	GD	Pts	Qualification or relegation
1	FC Locarno	24	15	5	4	48	23	+25	35	Play-off to Nationalliga B
2	FC Baden	24	15	4	5	64	32	+32	34	
3	FC Vaduz	24	14	3	7	71	44	+27	31	
4	FC Wettingen	24	11	5	8	56	40	+16	27	
5	FC Dietikon	24	10	5	9	40	42	−2	25	
6	FC Rapid Lugano	24	11	3	10	35	48	−13	25	
7	FC Red Star Zürich	24	10	4	10	51	46	+5	24	
8	FC Küsnacht	24	10	4	10	33	40	−7	24	
9	FC St. Gallen	24	9	5	10	57	55	+2	23	
10	FC Oerlikon/Polizei ZH	24	9	3	12	49	51	−2	21	
11	FC Blue Stars Zürich	24	6	6	12	56	66	−10	18	
12	FC Solduno	24	4	5	15	32	76	−44	13	Relegation to 2. Liga Interregional
13	FC Bülach	24	3	6	15	39	68	−29	12	Relegation to 2. Liga Interregional

Source: RSSSF
Rules for classification: 1) Points; 2) Goal difference within the league, but decider play-off for qualifiers.

=== Promotion play-off ===
The three group winners played single a round-robin for the two promotion slots and for the championship.

==== Round-robin ====
Pos	Team	Pld	W	D	L	GF	GA	GD	Pts	LOC	ETO	SOL
1	Locarno	2	1	0	1	4	2	+2	2	—	—	4–0
2	Etoile Carouge	2	1	0	1	4	3	+1	2	2–0	—	—
3	Solothurn	2	1	0	1	3	6	−3	2	—	3–2	—

Source: RSSSF
Rules for classification: 1) Points; 2) Head-to-head 3) Decider.

==== Replay ====
A replay round-robin was required, due to the egality of the teams

Pos	Team	Pld	W	D	L	GF	GA	GD	Pts	SOL	ETO	LOC
1	Solothurn	2	1	1	0	4	2	+2	3	—	—	3–1
2	Etoile Carouge	2	0	2	0	2	2	0	2	1–1	—	—
3	Locarno	2	0	1	1	2	4	−2	1	—	1–1	—

Source: RSSSF
Rules for classification: 1) Points; 2) Head-to-head 3) Decider.

FC Solothurn became 1. Liga champions. The champions and the runners-up Etoile Carouge were promoted to 1963–64 Nationalliga B.

== Swiss Cup ==
The competition was played in a knockout system. In the case of a draw, extra time was played. If the teams were still level after extra time, the match was replayed at the away team's ground. In the replay, in case of a draw after extra time, a toss of the coin would decide which team progressed.

=== Early rounds ===
The routes of the finalists to the final were:

- Second round: teams from the NLA and NLB with byes.
- Third round: Basel-Black Stars 4:0. GC-St. Gallen 3:0.
- Fourth round: YB-Basel 0:2. GC-Dietikon 3:1 (a.e.t.).
- Fifth round: Basel-Burgdorf 7:1. Baden-GC 0:4
- Quarter-finals: Chiasso-Basel 1:2. GC-Sion 4:0.
- Semi-finals: Basel-Lausanne 1:0. GC-Servette 4:2.

=== Final ===
The final was held in the former Wankdorf Stadium on Easter Monday 1963.

15 April 1963
15:00
Final

Basel	2–0	Grasshoppers
Heinz Blumer 59' (1:0); Otto Ludwig 67' (2:0)	Summary

Wankdorf Stadium, Bern
Attendance: 40,000
Referee: (Switzerland) Daniel Mellet (Lausanne)

Basel won the cup and this was the club's third cup title to this date.

== Swiss Clubs in Europe ==
- Servette as 1961–62 Nationalliga A champions: 1962–63 European Cup and entered 1962–63 Intertoto Cup
- Lausanne-Sport as 1961–62 Swiss Cup winners: 1962–63 Cup Winners' Cup
- La Chaux-de-Fonds: entered 1962–63 Intertoto Cup
- Young Boys: entered 1962–63 Intertoto Cup
- Basel: entered 1962–63 Intertoto Cup

=== Servette ===
==== European Cup ====
===== Preliminary round =====
12 September 1962 First leg	Servette (Switzerland)	1–3	(Netherlands) Feyenoord	Stade des Charmilles, Genève
21:30 CET	Mekhloufi 33'	Report	Kruiver 44', 50'; Bennaars 70'	Attendance: 18,133; Referee: Gérard Versyp (Belgium)

19 September 1962 Second leg	Feyenoord (Netherlands)	1–3 (4–4 agg.)	(Switzerland) Servette	De Kuip, Rotterdam
	Bennaars 76' (pen.)	Report	Mekhloufi 16'; Heuri 26'; Desbiolles 52'	Attendance: 30,064; Referee: Marcel Raeymaekers (Belgium)

Servette 4–4 Feyenoord on aggregate; Therefore a play-off was required.

17 October 1962 Play-off	Feyenoord (Netherlands)	3–1 (a.e.t.)	(Switzerland) Servette	Rheinstadion, Düsseldorf
20:00 CET	Kruiver 52'; Bouwmeester 91'; Van der Gijp 98' (pen.)	Report	Németh 33'	Attendance: 9,737; Referee: Johannes Malka (West Germany)

Feyenoord won play-off 3–1.

==== Intertoto Cup ====
===== Group A4 =====
Pos	Team	Pld	W	D	L	GF	GA	GD	Pts	SER	SAR	NIT	NÎM
1	(Switzerland) Servette (A)	6	3	2	1	11	9	+2	8	—	3–2	2–1	4–1
2	(Socialist Federal Republic of Yugoslavia) Sarajevo	6	2	2	2	9	12	−3	6	0–0	—	3–2	2–1
3	(Czechoslovakia) Nitra	6	2	1	3	12	9	+3	5	0–0	5–1	—	4–1
4	(France) Nîmes	6	2	1	3	11	13	−2	5	5–2	1–1	2–0	—

Source: mogiel.net
Rules for classification: 1) Points; 2) Goal difference; 3) Goals scored; 4) Head-to-head points; 5) Away goals scored; 6) Draw.
(A) Advance to a further round

===== Quarter-final =====
15 August 1962 First leg	Servette (Switzerland)	1–0	(Hungary) Tatabánya	Charmilles Stadium, Geneva
	Mekhloufi 82'			Attendance: 13,000; Referee: (Germany) Rudolf Kreitlein

22 August 1962 Second leg	Tatabánya (Hungary)	6–0 (6–1 agg.)	(Switzerland) Servette	Stadion Gyula Grosics, Tatabánya
	Szovják 11', 51'; Bíró 54', 66'; Sátori 77'; Csernai 80'			Attendance: 13,000; Referee: (Austria) Friedrich Mayer

Tatabánya win 6–1 on aggregate and continue to semi-finals.

=== Lausanne-Sport ===
==== Cup Winners' Cup ====
===== Preliminary round =====
19 September 1962 First leg	Lausanne Sports (Switzerland)	3–0	(Netherlands) Sparta Rotterdam	Stade Olympique de la Pontaise, Lausanne
	Vonlanthen 12'; Frigerio 55' ter Horst 64' (o.g.)	Summary		Attendance: 7,531; Referee: Henri Faucheux (France)

3 October 1962 Second leg	Sparta Rotterdam (Netherlands)	4–2 (4–5 agg.)	(Switzerland) Lausanne Sports	De Kuip, Rotterdam
	Wilson 42', 51', 57' van Miert 87'	Summary	Dürr 78' (pen.); Hertig 83'	Attendance: 21,390; Referee: Kevin Howley (England)

Lausanne Sports won 5–4 on aggregate.

===== First round =====
14 November 1962 First leg	Lausanne-Sports (Switzerland)	1–1	(Czechoslovakia) Slovan Bratislava	Stade Olympique de la Pontaise, Lausanne
	Hosp 40'	Summary	Moravčík 52'	Attendance: 11,875; Referee: Alfeo Grignani (Italy)

28 November 1962 Second leg	Slovan Bratislava (Czechoslovakia)	1–0 (2–1 agg.)	(Switzerland) Lausanne-Sports	Tehelné pole, Bratislava
	Moravčík 86'	Summary		Attendance: 5,314; Referee: Fritz Seipelt (Austria)

Slovan Bratislava won 2–1 on aggregate.

=== La Chaux-de-Fonds ===
==== Intertoto Cup ====
===== Group A3 =====
Pos	Team	Pld	W	D	L	GF	GA	GD	Pts	PAD	DOR	CDF	PLZ
1	(Italy) Padova (A)	6	4	1	1	15	8	+7	9	—	1–0	4–2	5–0
2	(Hungary) Dorogi Bányász	6	3	0	3	13	13	0	6	3–1	—	4–1	4–2
3	(Switzerland) La Chaux-de-Fonds	6	2	1	3	10	13	−3	5	2–3	1–0	—	3–1
4	(Czechoslovakia) Spartak Plzeň	6	1	2	3	12	16	−4	4	1–1	7–2	1–1	—

Source: mogiel.net
Rules for classification: 1) Points; 2) Goal difference; 3) Goals scored; 4) Head-to-head points; 5) Away goals scored; 6) Draw.
(A) Advance to a further round

=== Young Boys ===
==== Intertoto Cup ====
===== Group A1 =====
Pos	Team	Pld	W	D	L	GF	GA	GD	Pts	BRA	PAR	VEN	YB
1	(Czechoslovakia) Slovnaft Bratislava (A)	6	4	0	2	14	10	+4	8	—	4–2	2–0	1–0
2	(France) RCF Paris	6	2	3	1	20	18	+2	7	4–2	—	3–3	3–1
3	(Italy) Venezia	6	2	2	2	18	14	+4	6	4–1	4–4	—	6–1
4	(Switzerland) Young Boys	6	1	1	4	9	19	−10	3	0–4	4–4	3–1	—

Source: mogiel.net
Rules for classification: 1) Points; 2) Goal difference; 3) Goals scored; 4) Head-to-head points; 5) Away goals scored; 6) Draw.
(A) Advance to a further round

=== Basel ===
==== Intertoto Cup ====
===== Group B3 =====
Pos	Team	Pld	W	D	L	GF	GA	GD	Pts	RIJ	OBE	BAS	PSV
1	(Socialist Federal Republic of Yugoslavia) Rijeka (A)	6	4	1	1	18	11	+7	9	—	2–1	5–1	3–1
2	(West Germany) Rot-Weiß Oberhausen	6	3	2	1	15	12	+3	8	4–3	—	2–2	3–1
3	(Switzerland) Basel	6	1	3	2	16	20	−4	5	2–2	4–4	—	4–3
4	(Netherlands) PSV	6	1	0	5	11	17	−6	2	2–3	0–1	4–3	—

Source: mogiel.net
Rules for classification: 1) Points; 2) Goal difference; 3) Goals scored; 4) Head-to-head points; 5) Away goals scored; 6) Draw.
(A) Advance to a further round

===== Matches =====
27 May 1962 Round 1	PSV Eindhoven (Netherlands)	4–3	(Switzerland) Basel	Eindhoven
	Kerkhoffs 40' (1:0); Kerkhoffs 41' (2:0); Svensson 50' (3:0); Kerkhoffs 85' (4:3)	Summary	60' (3:1) Stöckli; 68' (3:2) Meier; 69' (3:3) Meier	Attendance: 14,000

3 June 1962 Round 2	Basel (Switzerland)	2–2	(Socialist Federal Republic of Yugoslavia) HNK Rijeka	Landhof, Basel
16:45	Blumer 28' (1:0); Burri 79' (2:2)	Summary	63' (1:1) Balent; 73' (1:2) Zadel	Attendance: 4,500; Referee: (Switzerland) Josef Gulde St. Gallen

10 June 1962 Round 3	Rot-Weiss Oberhausen (West Germany)	2–2	(Switzerland) Basel	Niederrheinstadion, Oberhausen
	Ha. Siemensmeyer 14' (1:0); K.H. Feldkamp 70' (2:2)	Summary	45' (1:1) Burri; 56' (1:2) Oberer	Attendance: 3,000; Referee: (Germany) Weingärt

17 June 1962 Round 4	Basel (Switzerland)	4–4	(West Germany) Rot-Weiss Oberhausen	Landhof, Basel
14:30	Odermatt 23' (1:2); Stöckli 33' (2:2); Ludwig 60' (2:2); Michaud 86' (4:4); Burri (red card) 88'	Summary	7' (0:1) Sundermann; 12' (0:2) Laszig; 78' (pen. 3:3) Barwenzik; 84' (3:4) K.H.Feldkamp	Attendance: 2,000; Referee: (Switzerland) Othmar Huber Thun

24 June 1962 Round 5	HNK Rijeka (Socialist Federal Republic of Yugoslavia)	5–1	(Switzerland) Basel	Rijeka
	Zadel 7' (1:0); Lukaric 18' (2:0); Zadel 21' (3:0); Naumovic 22' (4:0); Medle 81' (5:1)	Summary	75' (4:1) Ludwig	Attendance: 2,000; Referee: (Socialist Federal Republic of Yugoslavia) Zivko Bajic

1 July 1962 Round 6	Basel (Switzerland)	4–3	(Netherlands) PSV Eindhoven	Landhof, Basel
18:00	Burri 12' (1:1); Stocker 53' (pen. 2:3); Odermatt 70' (3:3); Pfirter 83' (4:3)	Summary	11' (0:1) Pys; 14' (1:2) Brussalers; 29' (1:3) Brussalers	Attendance: 2,000; Referee: (Switzerland) Anton Bucheli Luzern

== Sources ==
- Switzerland 1962–63 at RSSSF
- European Competitions 1962–63 at RSSSF.com
- Cup finals at Fussball-Schweiz
- Intertoto history at Pawel Mogielnicki's Page
- Josef Zindel (2018). FC Basel 1893. Die ersten 125 Jahre (in German). Basel: Friedrich Reinhardt Verlag. ISBN 978-3-7245-2305-5.

Preceded by 1961–62	Seasons in Swiss football	Succeeded by 1963–64
