= 1964–65 Swiss Cup =

Tournament details
- Country: Switzerland

Final positions
- Champions: Sion
- Runners-up: Servette

The 1964–65 Swiss Cup was the 40th season of Switzerland's football cup competition, organised annually since 1925–26 by the Swiss Football Association.

== Overview ==
This season's cup competition began with one game of the first round being played on 6 September 1964. However the rest of the matches were played during the weekend of 12 and 13 September. The competition was to be completed on Easter Monday 19 April 1965 with the final, which was traditionally held at the former Wankdorf Stadium in Bern. The clubs from the 1964–65 Swiss 1. Liga were given a bye for the first round, they joined the competition in the second round, played on the week-end of 26 and 27 September. The clubs from this season's Nationalliga A (NLA) and from this season's Nationalliga B (NLB) were given byes for the first two rounds. These teams joined the competition in the third round, which was played on the week-end of 10 and 11 of October.

The matches were played in a knockout format. In the event of a draw after 90 minutes, the match went into extra time. In the event of a draw at the end of extra time, a replay was foreseen and this was played on the visiting team's pitch. If the replay ended in a draw after extra time, a toss of a coin would decide the outcome of the encounter. The cup winners qualified themselves for the first round of the Cup Winners' Cup in the next season.

== Round 1 ==
In the first phase, the lower league teams that had qualified themselves for the competition through their regional football association's regional cup competitions or their association's requirements, competed here. Whenever possible, the draw respected local regionalities. The first round was played on the weekend of 12 and 13 September 1964.

=== Summary ===
==== Region Ostschweiz ====
Team 1	Score	Team 2
12 and 13 September 1964
Arbon	9–2	FC Romanshorn
FC Rebstein	0–3	FC Glarus

==== Region Zürich ====
Team 1	Score	Team 2
12 and 13 September 1964
FC Küsnacht ZH	3–2 (a.e.t.)	Industrie Zürich
FC Seefeld ZH	0–1	Post Zürich
FC Thayngen	0–2	FC Altstetten (Zürich)
SV Höngg	1–2	Juventus Zürich
FC Wetzikon	3–1	FC Bauma
FC Lachen	2–2 (a.e.t.)	FC Uzwil
SC Veltheim	1–1 (a.e.t.)	FC Oberwinterthur

Replays

Team 1	Score	Team 2
20 September 1964
FC Uzwil	1–2	FC Lachen
FC Oberwinterthur	2–0	SC Veltheim

==== Region Bern ====
Team 1	Score	Team 2
12 and 13 September 1964
FC Victoria Bern	2–1	FC Morat
SC Sparta Bern	2–3	FC Helvetia Bern
FC Courtemaîche	3–4	FC Court
SC Aegerten-Brügg	2–3	US Bienne-Boujean
Madretsch Biel	8–2	FC Welschenrohr

==== Region Solothurn ====
Team 1	Score	Team 2
6 September 1964
FC Wolfwil	2–5	FC Klus-Balsthal
13 September 1964
Wangen bei Olten	0–6	FC Trimbach

==== Region Nordwestschweiz ====
Team 1	Score	Team 2
12 and 13 September 1964
FC Röschenz	3–1	FC Riehen
Old Boys	4–1	FC Aesch

==== Region Aargau ====
Team 1	Score	Team 2
12 and 13 September 1964
FC Buchs AG	6–2	FC Klingnau
FC Reinach	5–6 (a.e.t.)	Schöftland
Zofingen	4–2	FC Schönenwerd

==== Region Innerschweiz ====
Team 1	Score	Team 2
12 and 13 September 1964
Cham	4–1	FC Baar
Kickers Luzern	3–0	Ibach

==== Region Ticino ====
Team 1	Score	Team 2
12 and 13 September 1964
US Verscio	3–5	US Giubiasco
FC Melano	3–0	Mendrisio

==== Region Romande ====
Team 1	Score	Team 2
12 and 13 September 1964
FC Onex	3–0	CS International Genève
FC Bursins	1–5	Stade Nyonnais
FC Orbe	0–1	FC Assens
FC Villeneuve	1–5	Bulle
FC Lalden	3–2	FC Sierre
FC Stade Payerne	2–0	Central Fribourg
FC Boudry	2–1	FC Fleurier
FC Hauterive	6–3	Étoile-Sporting

== Round 2 ==
The clubs from the 1964–65 Swiss 1. Liga entered the competition at this stage.

=== Summary ===
Team 1	Score	Team 2
26 and 27 September 1964
Arbon	2–5	FC Rorschach
FC Glarus	2–3	Vaduz
FC Lachen	4–3	FC Widnau
FC Wetzikon	1–2	Wohlen
FC Küsnacht ZH	3–2 (a.e.t.)	Red Star
FC Oberwinterthur	1–4	FC Dietikon
Blue Stars	1–2	Polizei Zürich
Wettingen	3–0	Post Zürich
FC Altstetten (Zürich)	1–4	FC Turgi
Juventus Zürich	2–2 (a.e.t.)	St. Gallen
Locarno	4–0	Cham
Kickers Luzern	3–0	SC Zug
Bodio	2–4 (a.e.t.)	US Giubiasco
Burgdorf	4–0	FC Olten
Emmenbrücke	6–1	FC Melano
Old Boys	1–0	FC Gerlafingen
FC Röschenz	2–3	Concordia
Zofingen	2–3	Alle
FC Fontainemelon	2–3	SC Schöftland
FC Breitenbach	11–1	FC Klus-Balsthal
Delémont	1–0	FC Buchs AG
Nordstern	0–3	FC Trimbach
Madretsch Biel	2–3 (a.e.t.)	Neuchâtel Xamax
FC Court	0–8	Yverdon-Sport
FC Renens	2–0	FC Victoria Bern
Minerva Bern	6–0	FC Boudry
US Bienne-Boujean	4–2	FC Langenthal
FC Hauterive	6–2	ES Malley
Stade Payerne	1–4	Stade Lausanne
FC Helvetia Bern	0–2	FC Forward Morges
Martigny-Sports	3–1	FC Assens
Etoile Carouge	4–3	Bulle
FC Raron	2–1	FC Onex
Fribourg	3–2	Chênois
FC Versoix	2–2 (a.e.t.)	Stade Nyonnais
Vevey Sports	8–0	FC Lalden

Replay

Team 1	Score	Team 2
1 October 1964
Stade Nyonnais	9–1	FC Versoix
6 October 1964
St. Gallen	3–1	Juventus Zürich

== Round 3 ==
The clubs from this season's Nationalliga A (NLA) and from this season's Nationalliga B (NLB) joined the competition at this stage. However, there was a seeding and various teams could not be drawn against each other. Whenever possible, the draw respected local regionalities. The third round was played on the week-end of 16 and 17 October.

=== Summary ===
Team 1	Score	Team 2
10 and 11 October 1964
Servette	12–2	Vevey Sports
Basel	6–1	Locarno
Neuchâtel Xamax	1–4	Biel-Bienne
Baden	2–3	Vaduz
Bellinzona	2–0	Kickers Luzern
FC Raron	1–4	Urania Genève Sport
Moutier	1–4	Minerva Bern
Burgdorf	1–1 (a.e.t.)	Thun
Wohlen	3–4	Aarau
Winterthur	0–2	Wettingen
Chiasso	1–0	Concordia
La Chaux-de-Fonds	14–1	FC Forward Morges
Etoile Carouge	2–1	Cantonal Neuchâtel
Fribourg	0–1 (a.e.t.)	Delémont
Solothurn	0–2	FC Trimbach
Schaffhausen	3–0	FC Rorschach
US Bienne-Boujean	1–2	Bern
Lausanne-Sport	9–0	Martigny-Sports
Old Boys	1–4	Luzern
St. Gallen	3–6	Grasshopper Club
FC Renens	0–7	Sion
Emmenbrücke	3–0	US Giubiasco
FC Küsnacht ZH	1–5	Young Fellows
FC Porrentruy	4–1 (a.e.t.)	FC Breitenbach
Young Boys	3–1	Alle
FC Dietikon	0–8	Zürich
Lugano	6–0	SC Schöftland
Grenchen	3–1	FC Hauterive
FC Lachen	1–5	Brühl
Yverdon-Sport	5–1	FC Versoix
Le Locle-Sports	1–1	Stade Lausanne
Polizei Zürich	5–2	FC Turgi

Replays

Team 1	Score	Team 2
14 October 1964
Stade Lausanne	4–5	Le Locle-Sports
21 October 1964
Thun	1–2	Burgdorf

=== Matches ===
10 October 1964

Servette	12–2	Vevey Sports
2x Desbiolles; 3x Németh; 2x Bosson; 1x Schaller; 2x Heuri; 2x Kvicinsky	Servette summary	Goal

Stade des Charmilles, Geneva

11 October 1964
14:30

Basel	6–1	Locarno
Frigerio 11' (1:0); Blumer 40' (2:1); Blumer 51' (3:1); Frigerio 60' (4:1); Moscatelli (yellow card) (goal) 73' (5:1); Frigerio 82' (6:1)	Summary	31' (pen. 1:1) Comel; (yellow card) Cattarin (II)

St. Jakob Stadium, Basel
Attendance: 2,500
Referee: (Switzerland) Fernand Burioli (Lausanne)

11 October 1964

Wohlen	3–4	Aarau
Goal	FCA summary	Goal

Stadion Niedermatten, Wohlen

11 October 1964

Chiasso	1–0	Concordia
(1:0)	[ summary]

Stadio Comunale Riva IV, Chiasso

11 October 1964

FC Dietikon	0–8	Zürich
	FCZ summary	7' (0:1) Brizzi; 20' (0:2) Rüfli; 23' (0:3) Rüfli; 29' (0:4) Benkö; 35' (0:5) Benkö; 47' (0:6) Rüfli; 63' (0:7) Winiger; 70' (0:8) Rüfli

Fussballplatz Dornau, Dietikon
Attendance: 2,400
Referee: (Switzerland) Luigi Grassi (Novazzano)

== Round 4 ==
=== Summary ===
Team 1	Score	Team 2
30 October and 1 November 1964
Basel	3–1	Bern
Lausanne-Sport	3–1	Biel-Bienne
Vaduz	1–4	Luzern
Grasshopper Club	2–0	Bellinzona
Sion	2–1	Urania Genève Sport
Emmenbrücke	1–2	Young Fellows
Minerva Bern	2–1	Burgdorf
FC Porrentruy	2–0	Aarau
Wettingen	1–4	Young Boys
Zürich	0–1	Lugano
Grenchen	0–6	Servette
Chiasso	2–1	Brühl
Yverdon-Sport	3–6 (a.e.t.)	La Chaux-de-Fonds
Le Locle-Sports	3–0	Etoile Carouge
Delémont	3–0	FC Trimbach
Polizei Zürich	1–0	Schaffhausen

=== Matches ===
1 November 1964
14:30

Basel	3–1	Bern
Pfirter 10' (1:0); Hauser 32' (2:0); Gabrieli 82' (3:1)	Summary	72' (2:1) Oehler

St. Jakob Stadium, Basel
Attendance: 3,000
Referee: (Switzerland) Guinnard (Gletterens)

1 November 1964

FC Porrentruy	2–0	Aarau
Goal	FCA summary

Stade du Tirage, Porrentruy

1 November 1964

Zürich	0–1	Lugano
	FCZ summary	10' (0:1) Brenna

Letzigrund, Zürich
Attendance: 5,000
Referee: (Switzerland) Daniel Mellet (Lausanne)

1 November 1964

Grenchen	0–6	Servette
	Servette summary	(1:0) Daina (0:2) Schindelholz (0:3) Bosson (0:4) Németh (0:5) Mocellin (0:6) Heuri

Stadium Brühl, Grenchen

== Round 5 ==
=== Summary ===
Team 1	Score	Team 2
5 and 6 December 1964
Basel	3–2	Lausanne-Sport
Luzern	2–4	Grasshopper Club
Sion	2–0	Young Fellows
Minerva Bern	3–0	FC Porrentruy
Servette	8–0	Chiasso
Delémont	2–2 (a.e.t.)	Polizei Zürich
16 December 1964
La Chaux-de-Fonds	2–3	Le Locle-Sports
27 December 1964
Young Boys	2–1	Lugano

Replay

Team 1	Score	Team 2
27 December 1964
Polizei Zürich	2–4 (a.e.t.)	Delémont

=== Matches ===
5 December 1964
14:30

Basel	3–2	Lausanne Sports
Frigerio 2' (1:0); Frigerio 17' (2:0); Moscatelli 30' (3:2)	Summary	22' (2:1) Hosp; 28' (2:2) Hosp

St. Jakob Stadium, Basel
Attendance: 11,000
Referee: (Switzerland) Karl Göppel (Zürich)

6 December 1964

Servette	8–0	Chiasso
4x Schindelholz; 2x Daina; 1x Németh; 1x Bosson	Servette summary

Stade des Charmilles, Geneva

== Quarter-finals ==
=== Summary ===
Team 1	Score	Team 2
27 December 1964
Basel	3–1 (a.e.t.)	Grasshopper Club
Sion	4–1	Minerva Bern
Servette	2–1	Le Locle-Sports
10 January 1965
Delémont	0–2	Young Boys

=== Matches ===
27 December 1964
14:30

Basel	3–1 (a.e.t.)	Grasshoppers
Stocker (penalty missed) 40′ Weber 88' (1:1); Frigerio 116' (2:1); Hauser 120' (3:1)	FCB summary	8' (0:1) Blättler

St. Jakob Stadium, Basel
Attendance: 8,700
Referee: (Switzerland) Gilbert Droz (Marin)

27 December 1964

Servette	2–1	Le Locle-Sports
Németh; Németh	Servette summary	Goal

Stade des Charmilles, Geneva

== Semi-finals ==
=== Summary ===
Team 1	Score	Team 2
7 March 1965
Basel	2–3	Sion
14 March 1965
Young Boys	0–2	Servette

=== Matches ===
7 March 1965
15:00

Basel	2–3	Sion
Frigerio 52' (1:2); Odermatt 70' (2:3)	FCB summary	1' (1:0) Perroud; 35' (2:0) Georgy; 55' (1:3) Stockbauer

St. Jakob Stadium, Basel
Attendance: 7,000
Referee: (Switzerland) Walter Hardmeier (Thalwil)

14 March 1965

Young Boys	0–2	Servette
	Servette summary	3' (0:1) Németh; 55' (0:2) Schindelholz

Wankdorf Stadium, Bern

== Final ==
The final was held at the former Wankdorf Stadium in Bern on Easter Monday 1966.

=== Summary ===
Team 1	Score	Team 2
19 April 1965
Sion	2–1	Servette

=== Telegram ===
19 April 1965
15:00

Sion	2–1	Servette
Georgy 13' (1:0); Gasser 84' (2:0)	Fussball-Schweiz summary	90' (2:1) Daina

Wankdorf Stadium, Bern
Attendance: 33,000
Referee: (Switzerland) Karl Keller (Basel)

Sion won the cup and this was the club's first cup title to this date.

== Further in Swiss football ==
- 1964–65 Nationalliga A
- 1964–65 Swiss 1. Liga

== Sources ==
- Fussball-Schweiz
- FCB Cup games 1964–65 at fcb-achiv.ch
- Switzerland 1964–65 at RSSSF

Preceded by 1963–64	Swiss Cup seasons	Succeeded by 1965–66
