= 1963–64 Swiss Cup =

Tournament details
- Country: Switzerland

Final positions
- Champions: Lausanne-Sport
- Runners-up: La Chaux-de-Fonds

The 1963–64 Swiss Cup was the 39th season of Switzerland's football cup competition, organised annually since 1925–26 by the Swiss Football Association.

== Overview ==
This season's cup competition began with the games of the first round, played on the week-end of the 7 and 8 September 1963 and the replays were held one week later. The competition was completed on Easter Monday 30 March 1964, with the final, which was traditionally held at the former Wankdorf Stadium in Bern. The clubs from the 1963–64 Swiss 1. Liga were given a bye for the first round, they played in the second round on the week-end of 21 and 22 September. The clubs from this season's Nationalliga A (NLA) and from this season's Nationalliga B (NLB) were given byes for the first two rounds. These teams joined the competition in the third round, which was played on the week-end of 5 and 6 of October.

The matches were played in a knockout format. In the event of a draw after 90 minutes, the match went into extra time. In the event of a draw at the end of extra time, a replay was foreseen and this was played on the visiting team's pitch. If the replay ended in a draw after extra time, a toss of a coin would decide the outcome of the encounter. The cup winners qualified themselves for the first round of the Cup Winners' Cup in the next season.

== Round 1 ==
In the first phase, the lower league teams that had qualified themselves for the competition through their regional football association's regional cup competitions or their association's requirements, competed here. The clubs from the 1963–64 Swiss 1. Liga were given a bye for the first round and whenever possible, the draw respected local regionalities. The first round was played on the weekend of 7 and 8 September 1963.

=== Summary ===
Team 1	Score	Team 2
7 and 8 September 1963
FC Montlingen	1–5	FC Rorschach
Kreuzlingen	0–1	FC Amriswil
FC Sargans	3–1	Triesen
FC Näfels	0–2	FC Wil
FC Kilchberg ZH	4–2	FC Windisch AG
Ballspielclub Zürich	3–3 (a.e.t.)	FC Oerlikon ZH
FC Dübendorf	3–2 (a.e.t.)	SV Höngg
FC Neuhausen	9–0	FC Töss
FC Lachen	9–3	FC Horgen
FC Oberwinterthur	1–1 (a.e.t.)	Uster
FC Reconvilier	1–0	FC Fontainemelon
Bözingen 34	2–1	Lengnau
FC Flamatt	1–5	SC Sparta Bern
FC Courtemaîche	2–2 (a.e.t.)	Laufen
FC Selzach	2–1	SC Derendingen
FC Kappel bei Olten	3–5	FC Oensingen
FC Riehen	3–1	FC Münchenstein
FC Pratteln	0–1	FC Breite Basel
Zofingen	1–4	Schöftland
FC Kölliken	1–0	FC Dottikon
FC Sursee	3–0	Kriens
SC Zug	0–2	FC Zug
US Campagnes GE	3–5	FC Onex
FC Chailly/Lausanne	3–1	Stade Nyonnais
PTT Lausanne	1–3	Vallorbe-Sports
FC Lutry	3–0	FC Pully
FC Stade Payerne	3–5	FC Morat
Bulle	2–2 (a.e.t.)	FC Fétigny
Étoile-Sporting	4–2	FC Ticino Le Locle
FC Visp	6–3	FC Sierre
US Pro Daro	2–0	Biaschesi
FC Armonia Lugano	3–1	AC Taverne
14 September 1963
Dürrenast	2–1 (a.e.t.)	FC Victoria Bern

Replays

Team 1	Score	Team 2
15 September 1963
FC Oerlikon ZH	1–2	Ballspielclub Zürich
Uster	1–2	FC Oberwinterthur
Laufen	4–1	FC Courtemaîche
FC Fétigny	4–1	Bulle

== Round 2 ==
The clubs from the 1963–64 Swiss 1. Liga were given a bye for the first round, they now joined the competition in the second round.

=== Summary ===
Team 1	Score	Team 2
21 and 22 September 1963
Emmenbrücke	1–0	Bodio
FC Sursee	0–6	FC Langenthal
FC Riehen	0–2	Nordstern
FC Widnau	0–5	FC Amriswil
Laufen	0–3	Old Boys
Concordia	3–3 (a.e.t.)	FC Breite Basel
Schöftland	2–1	Wohlen
Alle	6–3 (a.e.t.)	SC Sparta Bern
FC Selzach	1–3	FC Gerlafingen
Kickers Luzern	2–1 (a.e.t.)	FC Armonia Lugano
Burgdorf	2–0	FC Oensingen
FC Kilchberg	0–5	Wettingen
FC Lachen	3–2	Red Star
FC Olten	2–1	FC Kölliken
Polizei Zürich	6–1	FC Dübendorf
Baden	4–3	Ballspielclub Zürich
FC Dietikon	3–2	FC Neuhausen
FC Zug	2–3	FC Rapid Lugano
Minerva Bern	7–0	Dürrenast
US Pro Daro	0–2	Locarno
FC Wil	5–4 (a.e.t.)	Vaduz
FC Rorschach	1–2	St. Gallen
Blue Stars	9–1	FC Sargans
FC Oberwinterthur	2–5	FC Küsnacht ZH
FC Fétigny	5–3 (a.e.t.)	FC Renens
FC Visp	3–0	FC Forward Morges
Neuchâtel Xamax	0–0 (a.e.t.)	Yverdon-Sport
FC Reconvilier	1–2	Fribourg
FC Morat	1–6	Le Locle-Sports
FC Haute-Rive	2–1	Étoile-Sporting
Martigny-Sports	1–1 (a.e.t.)	FC Versoix
ES Malley	2–2 (a.e.t.)	Vallorbe-Sports
FC Assens	3–4	FC Onex
FC Lutry	1–3	FC Raron
FC Chailly/Lausanne	1–9	Stade Lausanne
FC Bözingen 34	3–2 (a.e.t.)	Delémont

Replays

Team 1	Score	Team 2
29 September 1963
FC Breite Basel	0–2	Concordia
Yverdon-Sport	3–1	Neuchâtel Xamax
FC Versoix	3–0	Martigny-Sports
Vallorbe-Sports (t)	3–3 (a.e.t.)	ES Malley

(t): Vallorbe-Sports qualified on toss of a coin

== Round 3 ==
The teams from the NLA and NLB entered the cup competition in this round. However, they were seeded and could not be drawn against each other. Whenever possible, the draw respected local regionalities. The lower-tier team in each encounter was granted home advantage, if they so wished. The third round was played on the week-end of 5 and 6 of October.

=== Summary ===
Team 1	Score	Team 2
5 and 6 October 1963
Emmenbrücke	3–5	Chiasso
Thun	6–3	FC Langenthal
Urania Genève Sport	3–0	FC Fétigny
Lausanne-Sport	10–3	FC Visp
Nordstern	2–4	FC Porrentruy
FC Amriswil	1–1	Schaffhausen
Old Boys	0–3	Concordia
SC Schöftland	0–7	Basel
Alle	0–2	La Chaux-de-Fonds
Cantonal Neuchâtel	3–2	Yverdon-Sport
FC Gerlafingen	0–2	Biel-Bienne
Kickers Luzern	0–6	Luzern
Burgdorf	2–1	Solothurn
Bern	3–1	FC Bözingen 34
Wettingen	1–1 (a.e.t.)	Aarau
FC Lachen	0–7	Grasshopper Club
FC Olten	1–4 (a.e.t.)	Grenchen
Polizei Zürich	1–4	Moutier
Fribourg	1–4	Servette
Le Locle-Sports	3–1	FC Haute-Rive
Vallorbe-Sports	1–10	FC Versoix
FC Onex	1–5	Etoile Carouge
Sion	2–0	FC Raron
Vevey Sports	2–1	Stade Lausanne
Baden	6–1	FC Dietikon
Bellinzona	4–0	FC Rapid Lugano
Minerva Bern	1–7	Young Boys
Locarno	0–1	Lugano
FC Wil	2–5	Brühl
Young Fellows	6–3	St. Gallen
Blue Stars	1–10	Zürich
Winterthur	3–0	FC Küsnacht ZH

Replays

Team 1	Score	Team 2
13 October 1963
Aarau	3–1	Wettingen
not played, awarded forfeit 3–0
Schaffhausen	FF*	FC Amriswil

=== Matches ===
6 October 1963

SC Schöftland	0–7	Basel
	FCB summary	2' (0:1) Hofer; 32' (0:2) Odermatt; 39' (0:3) Weber; 55' (0:4) Hofer; 58' (0:5) Blumer; 75' (0:6) Lüth; 81' (0:7) Lüth

Hügeli, Sportanlage Rütimatten, Schöftland
Attendance: 1,800
Referee: (Switzerland) Ullrich Dübendorf

6 October 1963

Wettingen	1–1 (a.e.t.)	Aarau
Goal	FCA summary	Goal

Stadion Altenburg, Wettingen

13 October 1963
Replay

Aarau	3–1	Wettingen
Goal	FCA summary	Goal

Stadion Brügglifeld, Aarau

6 October 1963

Fribourg	1–4	Servette
Goal	Servette summary	1x Heuri; 2x Desbiolles; 1x Németh

Stade Universitaire, Fribourg

6 October 1963

Blue Stars	1–10	Zürich
Max Brun 72' (1:5)	FCZ summary	14' (0:1) von Burg; 22' (0:2) Meyer; 40' (0:3) Martinelli; 42' (0:4) von Burg; 63' (0:5) Feller; 75' (1:6) Brodmann; 77' (1:7) von Burg; 80' (1:8) Stürmer; 88' (1:9) von Burg; 90' (1:10) Feller

Letzigrund, Zürich
Attendance: 3,000
Referee: (Switzerland) Karl Strässle (Steinach)

== Round 4 ==
=== Summary ===
Team 1	Score	Team 2
19 and 20 October 1963
Servette	7–2	Le Locle-Sports
Chiasso	2–1	Thun
Urania Genève Sport	0–1	Lausanne-Sport
FC Porrentruy	3–1	Schaffhausen
Concordia	0–4	Basel
La Chaux-de-Fonds	4–0	Cantonal Neuchâtel
Biel-Bienne	6–2	Luzern
Burgdorf	3–1	Bern
Aarau	2–3	Grasshopper Club
Grenchen	5–1	Moutier
Servette	7–2	Le Locle-Sports
FC Versoix	3–1	Etoile Carouge
Sion	7–3 (a.e.t.)	Vevey Sports
Baden	1–4	Bellinzona
Young Boys	5–1	Lugano
Brühl	3–1	Young Fellows
Zürich	4–0	Winterthur

=== Matches ===
19 October 1963

Servette	7–2	Le Locle-Sports
2x Heuri; 1x Bosson; 1x Desbiolles; 2x Rahis; 1x Schindelholz	Servette summary	Goal

Stade des Charmilles, Geneva

20 October 1963
15:00

Concordia	0–4	Basel
	FCB summary	17' (0:1) Blumer; 20' (0:2) Baumann; 71' (0:3) Weber; 75' (0:4) Pfirter

St. Jakob Stadium, Basel
Attendance: 4,500
Referee: (Switzerland) Fritz Schorer (Interlaken)

20 October 1963

Zürich	4–0	Winterthur
Stürmer 24' (1:0) von Burg 44' (2:0); Feller 68' (3:0); Brodmann 77' (4:0)	FCZ summary

Letzigrund, Zürich
Attendance: 3,600
Referee: (Switzerland) Claude Stettler (Feuerthalen)

== Round 5 ==
=== Summary ===
Team 1	Score	Team 2
23 and 24 November 1963
Brühl	2–3	Zürich
Chiasso	1–7 (a.e.t.)	Lausanne-Sport
FC Porrentruy	1–0	Basel
La Chaux-de-Fonds	3–2	Biel-Bienne
Burgdorf	1–2	Grasshopper Club
Grenchen	0–2	Servette
FC Versoix	1–4	Sion
Bellinzona	1–2 (a.e.t.)	Young Boys

=== Matches ===
23 November 1963

Brühl	2–3	Zürich
Josef Neuville 53' (1:1); Weibel 59' (2:1)	FCZ summary	(penalty missed) 20′ Brodmann; 22' (0:1) Stürmer; 70' (2:2) von Burg; 77' (2:3) von Burg

Krontal, St. Gallen
Attendance: 6,500
Referee: (Switzerland) Roland David (Lausanne)

24 November 1963

FC Porrentruy	1–0	Basel
Jaeck 56' (1:0)	FCB summary

Stade du Tirage, Porrentruy
Attendance: 5'600
Referee: (Switzerland) Othmar Huber (Thun)

24 November 1963

Grenchen	0–2	Servette
	Servette summary	(0:1) Németh (0:2) Desbiolles

Stadium Brühl, Grenchen

== Quarter-finals ==
=== Summary ===
Team 1	Score	Team 2
22 December 1963
Zürich	1–2	Lausanne-Sport
FC Porrentruy	1–0	Sion
La Chaux-de-Fonds	5–1	Yverdon-Sport
Grasshopper Club	3–1	Servette

=== Matches ===
22 December 1963

Zürich	1–2	Lausanne-Sport
Martinelli 64' (1:2)	FCZ summary	4' (0:1) Hosp; 14' (0:2) Hosp

Letzigrund, Zürich
Attendance: 16,000
Referee: (Switzerland) Josef Heymann (Basel)

== Semi-finals ==
=== Summary ===
Team 1	Score	Team 2
1 March 1964
Lausanne-Sport	6–0	FC Porrentruy
La Chaux-de-Fonds	3–0	Grasshopper Club

=== Matches ===
1 March 1964

Lausanne-Sport	6–0	FC Porrentruy
Gottardi 13' (1:0); Gottardi 17' (2:0); Eschmann 23' (3:0); Hosp 23' (4:0); Eschmann 87' (5:0); Dürr 89' (6:0)	[ summary]

Pontaise, Lausanne

1 March 1964

La Chaux-de-Fonds	3–0	Grasshopper Club
Skiba 2' (1:0); Trivellin 53' (2:0); Skiba 79' (3:0)	[ summary]

Centre Sportif de la Charrière, La Chaux-de-Fonds

== Final ==
The final was held at the former Wankdorf Stadium in Bern on Easter Monday 1964.

=== Summary ===
Team 1	Score	Team 2
30 March 1964
Lausanne-Sport	2–0	La Chaux-de-Fonds

=== Telegram ===
30 March 1964

Lausanne-Sport	2–0	La Chaux-de-Fonds
Eschmann 25' (1:0); Gottardi 88' (2:0)	Fussball-Schweiz summary

Wankdorf Stadium, Bern
Attendance: 51,000
Referee: (Switzerland) Josef Heymann (Basel)

Lausanne-Sport won the cup and this was the club's sixth cup title to this date.

== Further in Swiss football ==
- 1963–64 Nationalliga A
- 1963–64 Swiss 1. Liga

== Sources ==
- Fussball-Schweiz
- FCB Cup games 1963–64 at fcb-achiv.ch
- Switzerland 1963–64 at RSSSF

Preceded by 1962–63	Swiss Cup seasons	Succeeded by 1964–65
