= 1963–64 Swiss 1. Liga =

1. Liga
- Season: 1963–64
- Champions: 1. Liga champions: FC Le Locle; Group West: FC Le Locle; Group Cenral: SC Burgdorf; Group South and East: FC Baden
- Promoted: FC Le Locle; FC Baden
- Relegated: Group West: FC Hauterive; FC Assens; Group Central: Kickers Luzern; Old Boys; Group South and East: FC Küsnacht; FC Rapid Lugano
- Matches: 3 times 156 and 1 decider plus 4 play-offs

The 1963–64 1. Liga season was the 32nd season of the 1. Liga since its creation in 1931. At this time, the 1. Liga was the third-tier of the Swiss football league system and it was the highest level of total amateur football. At this time, the clubs in the two higher divisions in Switzerland were beginning to employ professional or semi-professional players.

== Format ==
There were 39 teams competing in the 1. Liga 1963–64 season. They were divided into three regional groups, each group with 13 teams. Within each group, the teams would play a double round-robin to decide their league position. Two points were awarded for a win. The three group winners then contested a play-off round to decide the two promotion slots. The last two placed teams in each group were relegated to the 2. Liga (fourth tier).

== Group West ==
=== Teams, locations ===
Club	Based in	Canton	Stadium	Capacity
FC Assens	Assens	Vaud	Terrain FC Assens	1,000
FC Fribourg	Fribourg	Fribourg	Stade Universitaire	9,000
FC Hauterive	Hauterive, Neuchâtel	Neuchâtel	Vieilles Carrières	1,000
FC Le Locle	Le Locle	Neuchâtel	Installation sportive - Jeanneret	3,142
ES FC Malley	Malley	Vaud	Centre sportif de la Tuilière	1,500
FC Martigny-Sports	Martigny	Valais	Stade d'Octodure	2,500
FC Forward Morges	Morges	Vaud	Parc des Sports	600
FC Raron	Raron	Valais	Sportplatz Rhoneglut	1,000
FC Renens	Renens	Vaud	Zone sportive du Censuy	2,300
FC Stade Lausanne	Ouchy, Lausanne	Vaud	Centre sportif de Vidy	1,000
FC Versoix	Versoix	Geneva	Centre sportif de la Bécassière	1,000
FC Xamax	Neuchâtel	Neuchâtel	Stade de la Maladière	25,500
Yverdon-Sport FC	Yverdon-les-Bains	Vaud	Stade Municipal	6,600

=== Final league table ===
Pos	Team	Pld	W	D	L	GF	GA	GD	Pts	Qualification or relegation
1	FC Le Locle	24	17	5	2	51	19	+32	39	Play-off to Nationalliga B
2	FC Fribourg	24	15	3	6	47	25	+22	33	
3	FC Raron	24	10	8	6	23	26	−3	28	
4	Yverdon-Sport FC	24	10	6	8	54	36	+18	26	
5	Xamax	24	11	4	9	43	33	+10	26	
6	ES FC Malley	24	7	11	6	32	31	+1	25	
7	FC Versoix	24	8	6	10	35	36	−1	22	
8	FC Forward Morges	24	6	8	10	29	36	−7	20	
9	FC Stade Lausanne	24	6	8	10	35	46	−11	20	
10	FC Renens	24	8	4	12	31	43	−12	20	
11	FC Martigny-Sports	24	9	2	13	25	41	−16	20	
12	FC Hauterive	24	7	3	14	39	48	−9	17	Relegation to 2. Liga Interregional
13	FC Assens	24	4	8	12	23	47	−24	16	Relegation to 2. Liga Interregional

Source: RSSSF
Rules for classification: 1) Points; 2) Goal difference within the league, but decider play-off for qualifiers.

== Group Central ==
=== Teams, locations ===
Club	Based in	Canton	Stadium	Capacity
FC Alle	Alle	Jura	Centre Sportif Régional	2,000
SC Burgdorf	Burgdorf	Bern	Stadion Neumatt	3,850
FC Concordia Basel	Basel	Basel-Stadt	Stadion Rankhof	7,000
SR Delémont	Delémont	Jura	La Blancherie	5,263
FC Emmenbrücke	Emmen	Lucerne	Stadion Gersag	8,700
FC Gerlafingen	Gerlafingen	Solothurn	Kirchacker	1,000
FC Kickers Luzern	Lucerne	Lucerne	Stadion Auf Tribschen	2,950
FC Langenthal	Langenthal	Bern	Rankmatte	2,000
FC Minerva Bern	Bern	Bern	Spitalacker	1,450
FC Nordstern Basel	Basel	Basel-Stadt	Rankhof	7,600
BSC Old Boys	Basel	Basel-Stadt	Stadion Schützenmatte	8,000
FC Olten	Olten	Solothurn	Sportanlagen Kleinholz	8,000
FC Wohlen	Wohlen	Aargau	Stadion Niedermatten	3,734

=== Final league table ===
Pos	Team	Pld	W	D	L	GF	GA	GD	Pts	Qualification or relegation
1	SC Burgdorf	24	16	4	4	55	25	+30	36	Play-off to Nationalliga B
2	FC Concordia Basel	24	16	3	5	54	29	+25	35	
3	SR Delémont	24	12	4	8	48	45	+3	28	
4	FC Alle	24	9	7	8	35	34	+1	25	
5	FC Emmenbrücke	24	9	6	9	43	39	+4	24	
6	FC Nordstern Basel	24	10	4	10	47	44	+3	24	
7	FC Olten	24	9	6	9	43	41	+2	24	
8	FC Minerva Bern	24	7	8	9	41	41	0	22	
9	FC Langenthal	24	9	4	11	55	56	−1	22	
10	FC Wohlen	24	9	4	11	37	46	−9	22	
11	FC Gerlafingen	24	8	5	11	35	46	−11	21	
12	FC Kickers Luzern	24	7	4	13	35	52	−17	18	Relegation to 2. Liga Interregional
13	BSC Old Boys	24	4	3	17	26	56	−30	11	Relegation to 2. Liga Interregional

Source: RSSSF
Rules for classification: 1) Points; 2) Goal difference within the league, but decider play-off for qualifiers.

== Group South and East ==
=== Teams, locations ===
Club	Based in	Canton	Stadium	Capacity
FC Baden	Baden	Aargau	Esp Stadium	7,000
FC Blue Stars Zürich	Zürich	Zürich	Hardhof	1,000
FC Bodio	Bodio	Ticino	Campo comunale Pollegio	1,000
FC Dietikon	Dietikon	Zürich	Fussballplatz Dornau	1,000
FC Küsnacht	Küsnacht	Zürich	Sportanlage Heslibach	2,300
FC Locarno	Locarno	Ticino	Stadio comunale Lido	5,000
FC Oerlikon/Polizei ZH	Oerlikon (Zürich)	Zürich	Sportanlage Neudorf	1,000
FC Rapid Lugano	Lugano	Ticino	Cornaredo Stadium	6,330
FC Red Star Zürich	Zürich	Zürich	Allmend Brunau	2,000
FC St. Gallen	St. Gallen	St. Gallen	Espenmoos	11,000
FC Vaduz	Vaduz	Liechtenstein	Rheinpark Stadion	7,584
FC Wettingen	Wettingen	Aargau	Stadion Altenburg	10,000
FC Widnau	Widnau	St. Gallen	Sportanlage Aegeten	2,000

=== Final league table ===
Pos	Team	Pld	W	D	L	GF	GA	GD	Pts	Qualification or relegation
1	FC Baden	24	14	7	3	61	28	+33	35	To decider for first place
2	FC Blue Stars Zürich	24	15	5	4	48	21	+27	35	To decider for first place
3	FC Red Star Zürich	24	11	6	7	45	39	+6	28	
4	FC Vaduz	24	12	2	10	46	40	+6	26	
5	FC Bodio	24	10	6	8	25	24	+1	26	
6	FC St. Gallen	24	11	3	10	54	42	+12	25	
7	FC Locarno	24	9	7	8	32	31	+1	25	
8	FC Wettingen	24	10	4	10	50	29	+21	24	
9	FC Oerlikon/Polizei ZH	24	8	5	11	33	46	−13	21	
10	FC Widnau	24	7	6	11	31	45	−14	20	
11	FC Dietikon	24	7	6	11	29	44	−15	20	
12	FC Küsnacht	24	7	4	13	31	48	−17	18	Relegation to 2. Liga Interregional
13	FC Rapid Lugano	24	2	5	17	23	71	−48	9	Relegation to 2. Liga Interregional

Source: RSSSF
Rules for classification: 1) Points; 2) Goal difference within the league, but decider play-off for qualifiers.

=== Decider for first place ===
The decider match for the group championship was played on 20 June at Stadion Brügglifeld in Aarau.

Team 1	Score	Team 2
FC Baden	3–2	Blue Stars

FC Baden won and advanced to play-offs. Blue Stars remained in the division.

== Promotion play-off ==
The three group winners played single a round-robin for the two promotion slots and for the championship.

=== Round-robin ===
Pos	Team	Pld	W	D	L	GF	GA	GD	Pts	LeL	BUR	BAD
1	Le Locle	2	2	0	0	7	2	+5	4	—	—	5–2
2	Burgdorf	2	0	1	1	3	5	−2	1	0–2	—	—
3	Baden	2	0	1	1	5	8	−3	1	—	3–3	—

Source: mogiel.net
Rules for classification: 1) Points; 2) Head-to-head 3) Decider.

FC Le Locle won, were declaired 1. Liga champions and were promoted to 1964–65 Nationalliga B.

=== Decider for second place ===
The decider match for second place was played on 12 July 1964 in Olten.

Team 1	Score	Team 2
Burgdorf	1–3	Baden

Baden won and were promoted to 1964–65 Nationalliga B. Burgdorf remained in the division.

== Further in Swiss football ==
- 1963–64 Nationalliga A
- 1963–64 Nationalliga B
- 1963–64 Swiss Cup

== Sources ==
- Switzerland 1963–64 at RSSSF

Preceded by 1962–63	Seasons in Swiss 1. Liga	Succeeded by 1964–65
