= 1964–65 Swiss 1. Liga =

1. Liga
- Season: 1964–65
- Champions: 1. Liga champions: St. Gallen; Group West: Etoile Carouge FC; Group Cenral: FC Langenthal; Group South and East: St. Gallen
- Promoted: St. Gallen; FC Blue Stars Zürich
- Relegated: Group West: ES FC Malley; FC Renens; Group Central: FC Breitenbach; FC Gerlafingen; Group South and East: FC Bodio; FC Turgi
- Matches: 3 times 156 and 1 decider plus 12 play-offs

The 1964–65 1. Liga season was the 33rd season of the 1. Liga since its creation in 1931. At this time, the 1. Liga was the third-tier of the Swiss football league system and it was the highest level of total amateur football. The two higher divisions in Switzerland, at this time, were becoming professional or semi-professional.

== Format ==
There were 39 teams competing in the 1. Liga 1965–66 season. They were divided into three regional groups, each group with 13 teams. Within each group, the teams would play a double round-robin to decide their league position. Two points were awarded for a win. The three group winners and the three runners-up then contested a play-off round to decide the two promotion slots. The last two placed teams in each group were relegated to the 2. Liga (fourth tier).

== Group West ==
=== Teams, locations ===
Club	Based in	Canton	Stadium	Capacity
CS Chênois	Thônex	Geneva	Stade des Trois-Chêne	8,000
Étoile Carouge FC	Carouge	Geneva	Stade de la Fontenette	3,690
FC Fribourg	Fribourg	Fribourg	Stade Universitaire	9,000
ES FC Malley	Malley	Vaud	Centre sportif de la Tuilière	1,500
FC Martigny-Sports	Martigny	Valais	Stade d'Octodure	2,500
FC Forward Morges	Morges	Vaud	Parc des Sports	600
FC Raron	Raron	Valais	Sportplatz Rhoneglut	1,000
FC Renens	Renens	Vaud	Zone sportive du Censuy	2,300
FC Stade Lausanne	Ouchy, Lausanne	Vaud	Centre sportif de Vidy	1,000
FC Versoix	Versoix	Geneva	Centre sportif de la Bécassière	1,000
Vevey Sports	Vevey	Vaud	Stade de Copet	4,000
Xamax	Neuchâtel	Neuchâtel	Stade de la Maladière	25,500
Yverdon-Sport FC	Yverdon-les-Bains	Vaud	Stade Municipal	6,600

=== Final league table ===
Pos	Team	Pld	W	D	L	GF	GA	GD	Pts	Qualification or relegation
1	Etoile Carouge FC	24	15	4	5	61	33	+28	34	Play-off to Nationalliga B
2	FC Fribourg	24	12	9	3	39	19	+20	33	To decider for second place
3	FC Forward Morges	24	14	5	5	47	31	+16	33	To decider for second place
4	Xamax	24	12	8	4	49	37	+12	32	
5	FC Raron	24	11	7	6	47	37	+10	29	
6	Vevey-Sports	24	10	5	9	55	52	+3	25	
7	CS Chênois	24	9	5	10	39	32	+7	23	
8	Yverdon-Sport FC	24	9	5	10	39	48	−9	23	
9	FC Versoix	24	6	7	11	36	46	−10	19	
10	FC Martigny-Sports	24	6	7	11	23	30	−7	19	
11	FC Stade Lausanne	24	7	5	12	40	56	−16	19	
12	ES FC Malley	24	5	6	13	38	52	−14	16	Relegation to 2. Liga Interregional
13	FC Renens	24	2	3	19	22	62	−40	7	Relegation to 2. Liga Interregional

Source: RSSSF
Rules for classification: 1) Points; 2) Goal difference within the league, but decider play-off for qualifiers.

=== Decider for second place ===
The decider match for second place was played on 6 June at Stade Municipal in Yverdon-les-Bains.

Team 1	Score	Team 2
FC Fribourg	3–0	FC Forward Morges

FC Fribourg win and advance to play-offs. FC Forward Morges remain in the division.

== Group Central ==
=== Teams, locations ===
Club	Based in	Canton	Stadium	Capacity
FC Alle	Alle	Jura	Centre Sportif Régional	2,000
FC Breitenbach	Breitenbach	Solothurn	Grien	2,000
SC Burgdorf	Burgdorf	Bern	Stadion Neumatt	3,850
FC Concordia Basel	Basel	Basel-Stadt	Stadion Rankhof	7,000
SR Delémont	Delémont	Jura	La Blancherie	5,263
FC Emmenbrücke	Emmen	Lucerne	Stadion Gersag	8,700
FC Fontainemelon	Neuchâtel	Neuchâtel	Centre Sportif Fontainemelon	1,000
FC Gerlafingen	Gerlafingen	Solothurn	Kirchacker	1,000
FC Langenthal	Langenthal	Bern	Rankmatte	2,000
FC Minerva Bern	Bern	Bern	Spitalacker	1,450
FC Nordstern Basel	Basel	Basel-Stadt	Rankhof	7,600
FC Olten	Olten	Solothurn	Sportanlagen Kleinholz	8,000
FC Wohlen	Wohlen	Aargau	Stadion Niedermatten	3,734

=== Final league table ===
Pos	Team	Pld	W	D	L	GF	GA	GD	Pts	Qualification or relegation
1	FC Langenthal	24	15	6	3	43	21	+22	36	Play-off to Nationalliga B
2	SC Burgdorf	24	16	3	5	50	23	+27	35	Play-off to Nationalliga B
3	FC Minerva Bern	24	14	6	4	45	21	+24	34	
4	SR Delémont	24	9	7	8	40	40	0	25	
5	FC Concordia Basel	24	8	6	10	39	39	0	22	
6	FC Emmenbrücke	24	8	6	10	38	40	−2	22	
7	FC Alle	24	9	4	11	39	43	−4	22	
8	FC Wohlen	24	10	2	12	45	50	−5	22	
9	FC Nordstern Basel	24	7	7	10	29	41	−12	21	
10	FC Olten	24	7	6	11	36	39	−3	20	
11	FC Fontainemelon	24	7	6	11	34	54	−20	20	
12	FC Breitenbach	24	7	3	14	46	50	−4	17	Relegation to 2. Liga Interregional
13	FC Gerlafingen	24	6	4	14	32	55	−23	16	Relegation to 2. Liga Interregional

Source: RSSSF
Rules for classification: 1) Points; 2) Goal difference within the league, but decider play-off for qualifiers.

== Group South and East ==
=== Teams, locations ===
Club	Based in	Canton	Stadium	Capacity
FC Blue Stars Zürich	Zürich	Zürich	Hardhof	1,000
FC Bodio	Bodio	Ticino	Campo comunale Pollegio	1,000
FC Dietikon	Dietikon	Zürich	Fussballplatz Dornau	1,000
FC Locarno	Locarno	Ticino	Stadio comunale Lido	5,000
FC Oerlikon/Polizei ZH	Oerlikon (Zürich)	Zürich	Sportanlage Neudorf	1,000
FC Red Star Zürich	Zürich	Zürich	Allmend Brunau	2,000
FC Rorschach	Rorschach	Schwyz	Sportplatz Kellen	1,000
FC St. Gallen	St. Gallen	St. Gallen	Espenmoos	11,000
FC Turgi	Turgi	Aargau	Sportanlage Oberau	1,000
FC Vaduz	Vaduz	Liechtenstein	Rheinpark Stadion	7,584
FC Wettingen	Wettingen	Aargau	Stadion Altenburg	10,000
FC Widnau	Widnau	St. Gallen	Sportanlage Aegeten	2,000
SC Zug	Zug	Zug	Herti Allmend Stadion	6,000

=== Final league table ===
Pos	Team	Pld	W	D	L	GF	GA	GD	Pts	Qualification or relegation
1	St. Gallen	24	16	4	4	79	41	+38	36	Play-off to Nationalliga B
2	FC Blue Stars Zürich	24	15	5	4	52	36	+16	35	Play-off to Nationalliga B
3	FC Wettingen	24	15	3	6	64	30	+34	33	
4	SC Zug	24	9	8	7	53	47	+6	26	
5	FC Red Star Zürich	24	10	6	8	48	43	+5	26	
6	FC Widnau	24	9	6	9	32	38	−6	24	
7	FC Oerlikon/Polizei ZH	24	9	5	10	43	49	−6	23	
8	FC Vaduz	24	9	4	11	44	62	−18	22	
9	FC Locarno	24	5	9	10	31	34	−3	19	
10	FC Dietikon	24	8	3	13	36	43	−7	19	
11	FC Rorschach	24	6	6	12	33	52	−19	18	
12	FC Bodio	24	5	7	12	37	54	−17	17	Relegation to 2. Liga Interregional
13	FC Turgi	24	4	6	14	30	53	−23	14	Relegation to 2. Liga Interregional

Source: RSSSF
Rules for classification: 1) Points; 2) Goal difference within the league, but decider play-off for qualifiers.

== Promotion play-off ==
The three group winners and the runners-up played a round-robin against the four teams who had not been in their group. The teams did not play against the team that had been in the same group.

=== Matches ===
The first games were played on 13 June 1965.

Team 1	Score	Team 2
Burgdorf	3–0	Fribourg
Blue Stars	3–1	Etoile Carouge
Langenthal	1–1	St. Gallen

The second round was played on 20 June.

Team 1	Score	Team 2
Etoile Carouge	0–2	Langenthal
Fribourg	2–3	Blue Stars
St. Gallen	4–2	Burgdorf

The third round was played on 27 June.

Team 1	Score	Team 2
Burgdorf	1–2	Etoile Carouge
Langenthal	4–4	Blue Stars
St. Gallen	1–0	Fribourg

The final round was played on 4 July.

Team 1	Score	Team 2
Blue Stars	1–0	Burgdorf
Etoile Carouge	2–3	St. Gallen
Fribourg	0–3	Langenthal

=== Final league table ===
Pos	Team	Pld	W	D	L	GF	GA	GD	Pts	Qualification
1	St. Gallen	4	3	1	0	9	5	+4	7	1. Liga champions, promoted to 1965–66 Nationalliga B
2	FC Blue Stars Zürich	4	3	1	0	11	7	+4	7	Promoted to 1965–66 Nationalliga B
3	FC Langenthal	4	2	2	0	10	5	+5	6	
4	Etoile Carouge FC	4	1	0	3	5	9	−4	2	
5	SC Burgdorf	4	1	0	3	6	7	−1	2	
6	FC Fribourg	4	0	0	4	2	10	−8	0	

Source: RSSSF
Rules for classification: 1) Points; 2) Head-to-head points; 3) Goal difference.

St. Gallen are declaired 1. Liga champions due to their position in the regular season.

== Further in Swiss football ==
- 1964–65 Nationalliga A
- 1964–65 Nationalliga B
- 1964–65 Swiss Cup

== Sources ==
- Switzerland 1964–65 at RSSSF

Preceded by 1963–64	Seasons in Swiss 1. Liga	Succeeded by 1965–66
