= Georges Perroud =

Swiss footballer (1941–2023)

Personal information
- Date of birth: 6 November 1941
- Place of birth: Fribourg, Switzerland
- Date of death: 21 November 2023 (aged 82)
- Place of death: Sion, Switzerland
- Height: 1.81 m (5 ft 11 in)
- Position: Forward

Youth career
- Cantonal Neuchâtel

Senior career*
Years	Team	Apps	(Gls)
1965–1967	Sion		
1970–1972	Servette		

International career
1966–1971	Switzerland	18	(1)
- * Club domestic league appearances and goals

Georges Perroud (6 November 1941 – 21 November 2023) was a Swiss footballer who played as a forward.

== Career ==
Born in Fribourg on 6 November 1941, Perroud started his career with Cantonal Neuchâtel, then with FC Sion. He ended his career with Servette FC in 1972. He played in 18 matches for the Switzerland national team, scoring one goal.

== Death ==
Perroud died in Sion on 21 November 2023, at the age of 82.
