= 1963–64 Nationalliga A =

Swiss football season

Nationalliga A
- Season: 1963–64
- Champions: La Chaux-de-Fonds
- Relegated: Schaffhausen; Cantonal
- Top goalscorer: Michel Desbiolles (Servette); 23 goals

Nationalliga B
- Season: 1963–64
- Champions: Lugano
- Promoted: Lugano; Bellinzona
- Relegated: Etoile Carouge; Vevey Sports
- Top goalscorer: Josef Neuville (SC Brühl); 21 goals

The following is the summary of the Swiss National League in the 1963–64 football season, both Nationalliga A and Nationalliga B. This was the 67th season of top-tier and the 66th season of second-tier football in Switzerland.

== Overview ==
The Swiss Football Association (ASF/SFV) had 28 member clubs at this time which were divided into two divisions of 14 teams each. The teams played a double round-robin to decide their table positions. Two points were awarded for a win, and one point was awarded for a draw. The top tier (NLA) was contested by the top 12 teams from the previous 1962–63 season and the two newly promoted teams FC Schaffhausen and Cantonal Neuchâtel. The champions would qualify for the 1964–65 European Cup and the last two teams in the league table at the end of the season were to be relegated.

The second-tier (NLB) was contested by the two teams that had been relegated from the NLA at the end of the last season, Young Fellows and Lugano, the ten teams that had been in third to twelfth position last season and the two newly promoted teams Etoile Carouge and Solothurn. The top two teams at the end of the season would be promoted to the 1964–65 NLA and the two last placed teams would be relegated to the 1964–65 Swiss 1. Liga.

The Swiss champions received a slot in the 1964–65 European Cup and the Cup winners received a slot in the 1964–65 Cup Winners' Cup.

== Nationalliga A ==
=== Teams, locations ===
Team	Based in	Canton	Stadium	Capacity
FC Basel	Basel	Basel-Stadt	St. Jakob Stadium	36,800
FC Biel-Bienne	Biel/Bienne	Bern	Stadion Gurzelen	15,000
FC Cantonal Neuchâtel	Neuchâtel	Neuchâtel	Stade de la Maladière	25,500
FC Chiasso	Chiasso	Ticino	Stadio Comunale Riva IV	4,000
Grasshopper Club Zürich	Zürich	Zürich	Hardturm	20,000
FC Grenchen	Grenchen	Solothurn	Stadium Brühl	15,100
FC La Chaux-de-Fonds	La Chaux-de-Fonds	Neuchâtel	Centre Sportif de la Charrière	12,700
FC Lausanne-Sport	Lausanne	Vaud	Pontaise	15,700
FC Luzern	Lucerne	Lucerne	Stadion Allmend	25,000
FC Schaffhausen	Schaffhausen	Schaffhausen	Stadion Breite	7,300
Servette FC	Geneva	Geneva	Stade des Charmilles	27,000
FC Sion	Sion	Valais	Stade de Tourbillon	16,000
BSC Young Boys	Bern	Bern	Wankdorf Stadium	56,000
FC Zürich	Zürich	Zürich	Letzigrund	25,000

=== Final league table ===
Pos	Team	Pld	W	D	L	GF	GA	GD	Pts	Qualification
1	La Chaux-de-Fonds	26	17	5	4	68	36	+32	39	Swiss champions, qualified for 1964–65 European Cup and entered 1964–65 Intertoto Cup
2	Zürich	26	18	2	6	84	37	+47	38	
3	Grenchen	26	17	4	5	57	35	+22	38	
4	Servette	26	18	0	8	74	33	+41	36	Entered 1964–65 Inter-Cities Fairs Cup
5	Lausanne-Sport	26	13	4	9	61	52	+9	30	Swiss Cup winners, qualified for 1964–65 European Cup Winners' Cup and entered 1964–65 Intertoto Cup
6	Young Boys	26	11	5	10	56	54	+2	27	
7	Basel	26	10	6	10	42	48	−6	26	Entered 1964–65 Inter-Cities Fairs Cup
8	Luzern	26	10	3	13	44	52	−8	23	
9	Chiasso	26	8	7	11	40	54	−14	23	
10	Sion	26	9	3	14	52	58	−6	21	
11	Grasshopper Club	26	8	3	15	42	64	−22	19	
12	Biel-Bienne	26	8	2	16	52	68	−16	18	
13	Schaffhausen	26	3	7	16	32	69	−37	13	Relegated: to 1964–65 Nationalliga B
14	Cantonal Neuchatel	26	4	5	17	38	82	−44	13	Relegated: 1964–65 Nationalliga B

Source: rsssf.com
Rules for classification: 1) Points; 2) Goal difference within the league, however with play-off for qualifiers;

=== Results ===
Home \ Away	BAS	BB	CAN	CDF	CHI	GCZ	GRE	LS	LUZ	SHA	SER	SIO	YB	ZÜR
Basel		4–0	3–2	2–2	2–2	2–1	0–2	4–2	3–0	2–2	0–6	2–0	2–1	0–5
Biel-Bienne	2–2		1–3	3–6	7–1	3–0	3–1	1–3	4–1	3–1	1–2	2–1	4–1	2–1
FC Cantonal Neuchâtel	2–1	2–2		3–5	2–0	1–1	2–3	0–1	0–2	1–2	2–4	3–1	0–3	1–8
La Chaux-de-Fonds	2–0	2–0	1–1		1–0	4–1	1–1	2–2	2–0	3–2	0–1	3–1	2–1	3–2
Chiasso	0–0	3–1	3–1	3–2		0–1	1–2	1–2	1–0	2–1	1–0	3–3	3–6	3–1
Grasshopper Club	3–2	4–2	2–2	1–3	2–2		1–2	3–2	3–6	4–0	0–6	3–0	0–3	3–0
Grenchen	0–1	3–1	4–1	2–1	3–1	3–2		1–3	2–1	3–0	3–4	3–2	2–2	3–2
Lausanne-Sport	2–3	6–1	7–2	1–2	1–1	3–1	1–3		4–1	3–1	1–0	4–0	3–1	0–2
Luzern	3–2	3–2	5–0	2–1	4–1	2–0	0–0	1–1		2–4	1–0	6–1	0–5	1–4
Schaffhausen	1–1	3–1	2–2	1–7	2–2	1–2	1–2	2–4	1–1		0–4	0–0	1–1	1–4
Servette	4–1	3–0	8–2	0–3	4–0	3–2	1–3	4–0	1–0	5–2		2–0	4–1	0–2
Sion	2–0	3–2	5–0	2–4	1–3	4–1	2–1	7–1	5–1	2–0	1–3		2–2	1–5
Young Boys	2–1	4–2	5–2	1–3	3–3	2–0	0–0	2–3	2–0	4–0	3–2	1–4		0–8
Zürich	0–2	5–2	3–1	3–3	2–0	6–1	2–1	5–2	3–1	4–1	4–3	3–2	0–0	

Source: rsssf.com
Legend: Blue = home team win; Yellow = draw; Red = away team win.

== Nationalliga B ==
=== Teams, locations ===
Team	Based in	Canton	Stadium	Capacity
FC Aarau	Aarau	Aargau	Stadion Brügglifeld	9,240
AC Bellinzona	Bellinzona	Ticino	Stadio Comunale Bellinzona	5,000
FC Bern	Bern	Bern	Stadion Neufeld	14,000
SC Brühl	St. Gallen	St. Gallen	Paul-Grüninger-Stadion	4,200
Étoile Carouge FC	Carouge	Geneva	Stade de la Fontenette	3,690
FC Lugano	Lugano	Ticino	Cornaredo Stadium	6,330
FC Moutier	Moutier	Bern	Stade de Chalière	5,000
FC Porrentruy	Porrentruy	Jura	Stade du Tirage	4,226
FC Solothurn	Solothurn	Solothurn	Stadion FC Solothurn	6,750
FC Thun	Thun	Bern	Stadion Lachen	10,350
Urania Genève Sport	Genève	Geneva	Stade de Frontenex	4,000
Vevey Sports	Vevey	Vaud	Stade de Copet	4,000
FC Winterthur	Winterthur	Zürich	Schützenwiese	8,550
FC Young Fellows	Zürich	Zürich	Utogrund	2,850

=== Final league table ===
Pos	Team	Pld	W	D	L	GF	GA	GD	Pts	Qualification or relegation
1	Lugano	26	16	5	5	53	26	+27	37	NLB Champions and promoted to 1964–65 Nationalliga A
2	AC Bellinzona	26	15	4	7	44	37	+7	34	Promoted to 1964–65 Nationalliga A
3	FC Thun	26	13	7	6	55	40	+15	33	
4	Urania Genève Sport	26	14	3	9	54	45	+9	31	
5	SC Brühl	26	11	8	7	50	37	+13	30	
6	Young Fellows Zürich	26	11	7	8	52	37	+15	29	
7	FC Solothurn	26	9	8	9	42	31	+11	26	
8	FC Winterthur	26	9	8	9	48	47	+1	26	
9	FC Porrentruy	26	10	6	10	47	52	−5	26	
10	FC Aarau	26	7	7	12	45	49	−4	21	
11	FC Bern	26	8	5	13	40	53	−13	21	
12	FC Moutier	26	8	4	14	34	54	−20	20	
13	Etoile Carouge FC	26	5	9	12	38	49	−11	19	Relegated to 1964–65 1. Liga
14	Vevey Sports	26	3	5	18	23	68	−45	11	Relegated to 1964–65 1. Liga

Source: rsssf.com
Rules for classification: 1) Points; 2) Goal difference within the league, however with play-off for qualifiers;

== Further in Swiss football ==
- 1963–64 Swiss Cup
- 1963–64 Swiss 1. Liga

== Sources ==
- Switzerland 1963–64 at RSSSF

Preceded by 1962–63	Nationalliga seasons in Switzerland	Succeeded by 1964–65
