= Klaus Stürmer =

German footballer

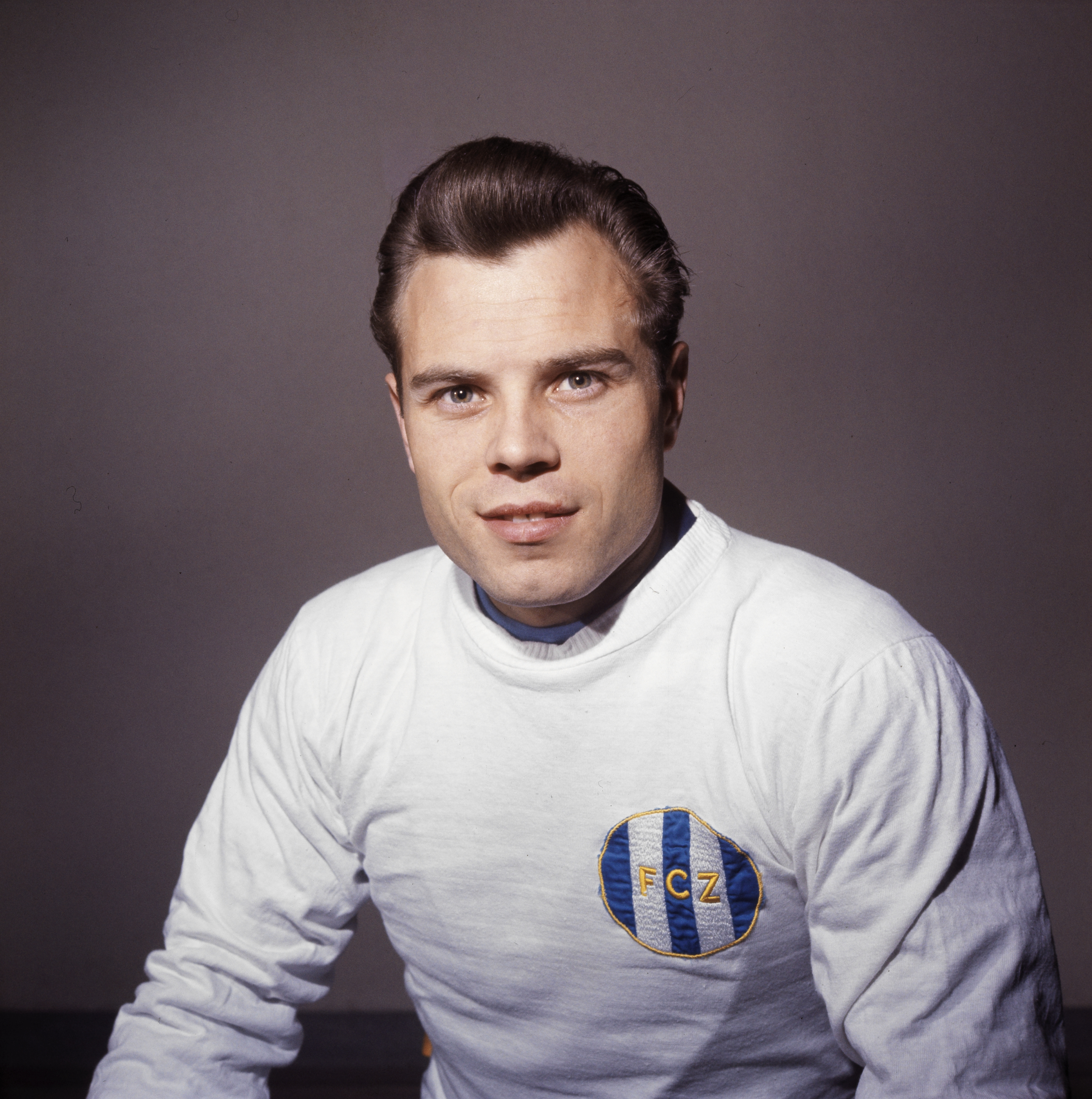
- Klaus Stürmer in 1963

Personal information
- Date of birth: 9 August 1935
- Place of birth: Glinde, Germany
- Date of death: 1 June 1971 (aged 35)
- Place of death: Zürich, Switzerland
- Position: Striker

Senior career*
Years	Team	Apps	(Gls)
1953–1961	Hamburger SV	158	(114)
1962–1964	FC Zürich	49	(34)
1964–1965	Young Fellows Zürich	17	(4)
1965–1967	FC Zürich	47	(24)
1967–1970	FC Grenchen		

International career
1954, 1961	Germany	2	(1)
- * Club domestic league appearances and goals

Klaus Stürmer (9 August 1935 – 1 June 1971) was a German football player. He represented Germany on two occasions, including a 1962 FIFA World Cup qualifier against Northern Ireland. On his debut on 16 October 1954 against France he became the youngest player of the post-war era to score for Germany at age 19 years 68 days, a record that was equalled in 2011 by Mario Götze

== Honours ==
- DFB-Pokal finalist: 1956.
- German champion: 1960.
- Swiss Super League champion: 1963, 1966.
- Swiss Cup winner: 1966.
