= 1964–65 Nationalliga A =

Swiss football season

Nationalliga A
- Season: 1964–65
- Champions: Lausanne-Sport
- Relegated: Bellinzona; Chiasso
- Top goalscorer: Rolf Blättler (GC); Pierre Kerkhoffs (LS) both 19 goals

Nationalliga B
- Season: 1964–65
- Champions: Urania Genève Sport
- Promoted: Urania Genève Sport; Young Fellows Zürich
- Relegated: FC Bern; FC Schaffhausen
- Top goalscorer: Hans Gloor (FC Aarau); 18 goals

The following is the summary of the Swiss National League in the 1964–65 football season, both Nationalliga A and Nationalliga B. This was the 68th season of top-tier and the 67th season of second-tier football in Switzerland.

== Overview ==
The Swiss Football Association (ASF/SFV) had 28 member clubs at this time which were divided into two divisions of 14 teams each. The teams played a double round-robin to decide their table positions. Two points were awarded for a win, and one point was awarded for a draw. The top tier (NLA) was contested by the top 12 teams from the previous 1963–64 season and the two newly promoted teams Lugano and Bellinzona. The champions would qualify for the 1965–66 European Cup and the last two teams in the league table at the end of the season were to be relegated.

The second-tier (NLB) was contested by the two teams that had been relegated from the NLA, FC Schaffhausen and Cantonal Neuchâtel, the ten teams that had been in third to twelfth position last season and the two newly promoted teams FC Le Locle and FC Baden. The top two teams at the end of the season would be promoted to the 1965–66 NLA and the two last placed teams would be relegated to the 1965–66 Swiss 1. Liga.

The Swiss champions received a slot in the 1965–66 European Cup and the Cup winners received a slot in the 1965–66 Cup Winners' Cup.

== Nationalliga A ==
The first round of the NLA was played on 22 August 1964. After playing 13 rounds, on 20 December, there was a winter break. This lasted until 20, 21 February 1965 as the 14th round was held. The season had 26 rounds and was completed on 12 June 1965.

=== Teams, locations ===
Team	Based in	Canton	Stadium	Capacity
FC Basel	Basel	Basel-Stadt	St. Jakob Stadium	36,800
AC Bellinzona	Bellinzona	Ticino	Stadio Comunale Bellinzona	5,000
FC Biel-Bienne	Biel/Bienne	Bern	Stadion Gurzelen	15,000
FC Chiasso	Chiasso	Ticino	Stadio Comunale Riva IV	4,000
Grasshopper Club Zürich	Zürich	Zürich	Hardturm	20,000
FC Grenchen	Grenchen	Solothurn	Stadium Brühl	15,100
FC La Chaux-de-Fonds	La Chaux-de-Fonds	Neuchâtel	Centre Sportif de la Charrière	12,700
FC Lausanne-Sport	Lausanne	Vaud	Pontaise	15,700
FC Lugano	Lugano	Ticino	Cornaredo Stadium	6,330
FC Luzern	Lucerne	Lucerne	Stadion Allmend	25,000
Servette FC	Geneva	Geneva	Stade des Charmilles	27,000
FC Sion	Sion	Valais	Stade de Tourbillon	16,000
BSC Young Boys	Bern	Bern	Wankdorf Stadium	56,000
FC Zürich	Zürich	Zürich	Letzigrund	25,000

=== Final league table ===
Pos	Team	Pld	W	D	L	GF	GA	GD	Pts	Qualification or relegation
1	Lausanne-Sport	26	15	6	5	61	32	+29	36	Swiss Champions, qualified for 1965–66 European Cup
2	Young Boys	26	14	4	8	59	43	+16	32	
3	Servette	26	14	3	9	59	30	+29	31	Entered 1965–66 Inter-Cities Fairs Cup
4	Grasshopper Club	26	11	7	8	54	47	+7	29	
5	Lugano	26	9	11	6	29	30	−1	29	Entered 1965–66 Intertoto Cup
6	La Chaux-de-Fonds	26	12	3	11	52	39	+13	27	Entered 1965–66 Intertoto Cup
7	Luzern	26	9	9	8	33	38	−5	27	
8	Basel	26	11	5	10	44	54	−10	27	Entered 1965–66 Inter-Cities Fairs Cup
9	Sion	26	10	5	11	42	34	+8	25	Swiss Cup winners, qualified for 1965–66 European Cup Winners' Cup
10	Zürich	26	8	7	11	41	38	+3	23	
11	Grenchen	26	6	9	11	35	43	−8	21	
12	Biel-Bienne	26	8	5	13	35	56	−21	21	
13	Bellinzona	26	5	9	12	21	42	−21	19	Relegated to 1965–66 Nationalliga B
14	Chiasso	26	6	5	15	22	61	−39	17	Relegated to 1965–66 Nationalliga B

Source: rsssf.com
Rules for classification: 1) Points; 2) Goal difference within the league, however with play-off for qualifiers;

=== Results ===
Home \ Away	BAS	BEL	BB	CDF	CHI	GCZ	GRE	LS	LUG	LUZ	SER	SIO	YB	ZÜR
Basel		3–0	4–3	1–1	2–1	5–4	2–0	3–3	2–0	2–2	2–3	4–0	0–1	1–0
Bellinzona	0–0		1–1	2–1	3–0	0–2	3–1	0–4	0–0	0–0	2–2	2–0	2–1	0–2
Biel-Bienne	3–2	2–1		0–3	0–1	2–2	1–1	3–6	0–3	3–0	1–0	2–2	0–4	1–0
Chaux-de-Fonds	6–0	2–0	2–1		3–1	4–1	0–2	2–4	0–1	2–1	1–2	2–1	4–2	2–1
Chiasso	0–1	1–1	0–1	1–6		0–5	0–0	1–4	1–0	2–1	1–0	1–0	2–0	1–4
Grasshopper	3–1	3–1	3–0	2–1	4–2		3–3	2–4	1–1	1–1	1–0	2–1	1–3	2–4
Grenchen	5–1	3–0	2–5	1–1	0–0	1–1		1–2	6–1	0–0	3–2	0–2	1–1	1–1
Lausanne-Sport	1–2	2–0	3–1	3–1	2–1	0–0	3–0		0–0	4–0	1–1	2–1	2–2	3–2
Lugano	2–0	0–0	1–1	1–0	1–0	2–3	1–0	0–5		3–1	4–1	0–0	2–0	2–2
Luzern	2–1	2–0	4–2	1–1	1–1	2–1	3–0	0–0	1–1		1–0	0–0	3–2	2–1
Servette	0–2	1–1	5–0	2–3	10–0	2–1	4–0	3–0	4–1	2–1		2–0	4–1	1–0
Sion	6–0	6–2	0–1	2–0	8–2	1–3	2–1	1–0	1–1	1–2	1–0		2–0	2–0
Young Boys	6–1	0–0	3–0	4–3	3–1	5–2	3–1	3–2	1–1	5–1	1–5	3–0		2–1
Zürich	2–2	3–0	3–1	2–1	1–1	1–1	1–2	2–1	0–0	3–1	1–3	2–2	2–3	

Source: rsssf.com
Legend: Blue = home team win; Yellow = draw; Red = away team win.

== Nationalliga B ==
=== Teams, locations ===
Team	Based in	Canton	Stadium	Capacity
FC Aarau	Aarau	Aargau	Stadion Brügglifeld	9,240
FC Baden	Baden	Aargau	Esp Stadium	7,000
FC Bern	Bern	Bern	Stadion Neufeld	14,000
SC Brühl	St. Gallen	St. Gallen	Paul-Grüninger-Stadion	4,200
FC Cantonal Neuchâtel	Neuchâtel	Neuchâtel	Stade de la Maladière	25,500
FC Le Locle	Le Locle	Neuchâtel	Installation sportive - Jeanneret	3,142
FC Moutier	Moutier	Bern	Stade de Chalière	5,000
FC Porrentruy	Porrentruy	Jura	Stade du Tirage	4,226
FC Schaffhausen	Schaffhausen	Schaffhausen	Stadion Breite	7,300
FC Solothurn	Solothurn	Solothurn	Stadion FC Solothurn	6,750
FC Thun	Thun	Bern	Stadion Lachen	10,350
Urania Genève Sport	Genève	Geneva	Stade de Frontenex	4,000
FC Winterthur	Winterthur	Zürich	Schützenwiese	8,550
FC Young Fellows Zürich	Zürich	Zürich	Utogrund	2,850

=== Final league table ===
Pos	Team	Pld	W	D	L	GF	GA	GD	Pts	Qualification or relegation
1	Urania Genève Sport	26	16	5	5	59	30	+29	37	NLB Champions and promoted to 1965–66 Nationalliga A
2	Young Fellows Zürich	26	14	6	6	48	32	+16	34	Promoted to 1965–66 Nationalliga A
3	FC Thun	26	11	8	7	60	52	+8	30	
4	FC Porrentruy	26	11	8	7	40	40	0	30	
5	FC Aarau	26	12	5	9	59	42	+17	29	
6	FC Cantonal Neuchâtel	26	12	4	10	49	39	+10	28	
7	FC Winterthur	26	11	6	9	43	40	+3	28	
8	SC Brühl	26	10	6	10	47	47	0	26	
9	FC Le Locle	26	10	6	10	48	50	−2	26	
10	FC Solothurn	26	9	5	12	42	48	−6	23	
11	FC Moutier	26	6	10	10	40	51	−11	22	
12	FC Baden	26	6	8	12	41	49	−8	20	
13	FC Bern	26	7	4	15	36	46	−10	18	Relegated to 1965–66 1. Liga
14	FC Schaffhausen	26	4	5	17	30	76	−46	13	Relegated to 1965–66 1. Liga

Source: rsssf.com
Rules for classification: 1) Points; 2) Goal difference within the league, however with play-off for qualifiers;

== Further in Swiss football ==
- 1964–65 Swiss Cup
- 1964–65 Swiss 1. Liga

== Sources ==
- Switzerland 1964–65 at RSSSF

Preceded by 1963–64	Nationalliga seasons in Switzerland	Succeeded by 1965–66
