= Vittore Gottardi =

Swiss footballer (1941–2015)

Vito Gottardi
Personal information
- Date of birth: 24 September 1941
- Place of birth: Caslano, Switzerland
- Date of death: 18 December 2015 (aged 74)
- Height: 1.68 m (5 ft 6 in)
- Positions: Winger; forward

Youth career
- Rapid Lugano

Senior career*
Years	Team	Apps	(Gls)
1959–1961	FC Lugano		
1962–1964	Lausanne		
1965–1968	FC Lugano		
1969–1970	Bellinzona	32	(6)

International career
1966–1967	Switzerland	4	(0)
- * Club domestic league appearances and goals

Vittore Gottardi (24 September 1941 – 18 December 2015) was a Swiss footballer who played as a winger or forward. He represented the Switzerland in the 1966 FIFA World Cup.

== Club career ==
Gottardi played for FC Lugano, Bellinzona, Lausanne and Rapid Lugano. He won the Swiss Cup with Lausanne in 1964 and with Lugano in 1968, but was on the losing side in the 1969 Cup final with Bellinzona.

== International career ==
Gottardi made his debut for Switzerland in a July 1966 FIFA World Cup match against Spain and earned a total of four caps. His final international was a January 1967 friendly match against Mexico.

== Honours ==
Lausanne-Sport

- Swiss Cup: 1964

Lugano

- Swiss Cup: 1968
