= Jean-Claude Schindelholz =

Swiss footballer (born 1940)

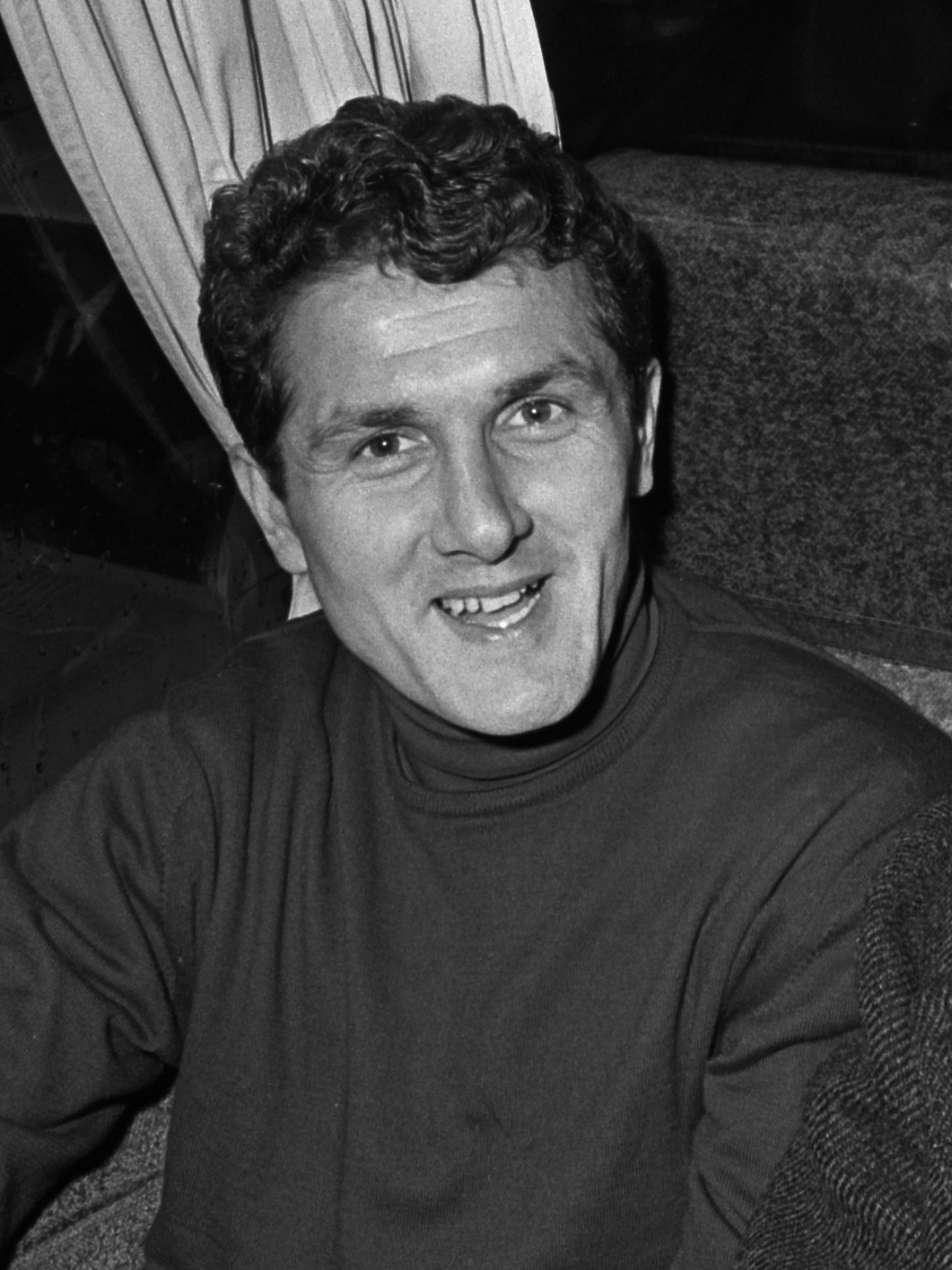
- Schindelholz in 1966

Personal information
- Date of birth: 11 October 1940 (age 86)
- Place of birth: Switzerland
- Position: Forward

Senior career*
Years	Team	Apps	(Gls)
1958–1963	FC Moutier		
1963–1971	Servette		
1971–1973	Vevey Sports		

International career
1964–1966	Switzerland	12	(1)
- * Club domestic league appearances and goals

Jean-Claude Schindelholz (born 11 October 1940) is a Swiss former footballer who played as a forward.

== Career ==
Born in Moutier, Schindelholz began playing football with FC Moutier's first team at age 17, and would help the club gain promotion to the Nationalliga B in 1962. During his career he achieved 13 caps and 1 goal for Switzerland between 15 April 1964, and 22 October 1966. He also played in Switzerland's 0–5 loss to West Germany at the 1966 World Cup.

On the club level he played for FC Moutier, Servette (1963–1971) and Vevey-Sports (1971–1973).
