= Stadion Niedermatten =

Football stadium in Wohlen, Switzerland

Coordinates: 47°21′25.19″N 8°15′50.64″E

Niedermatten
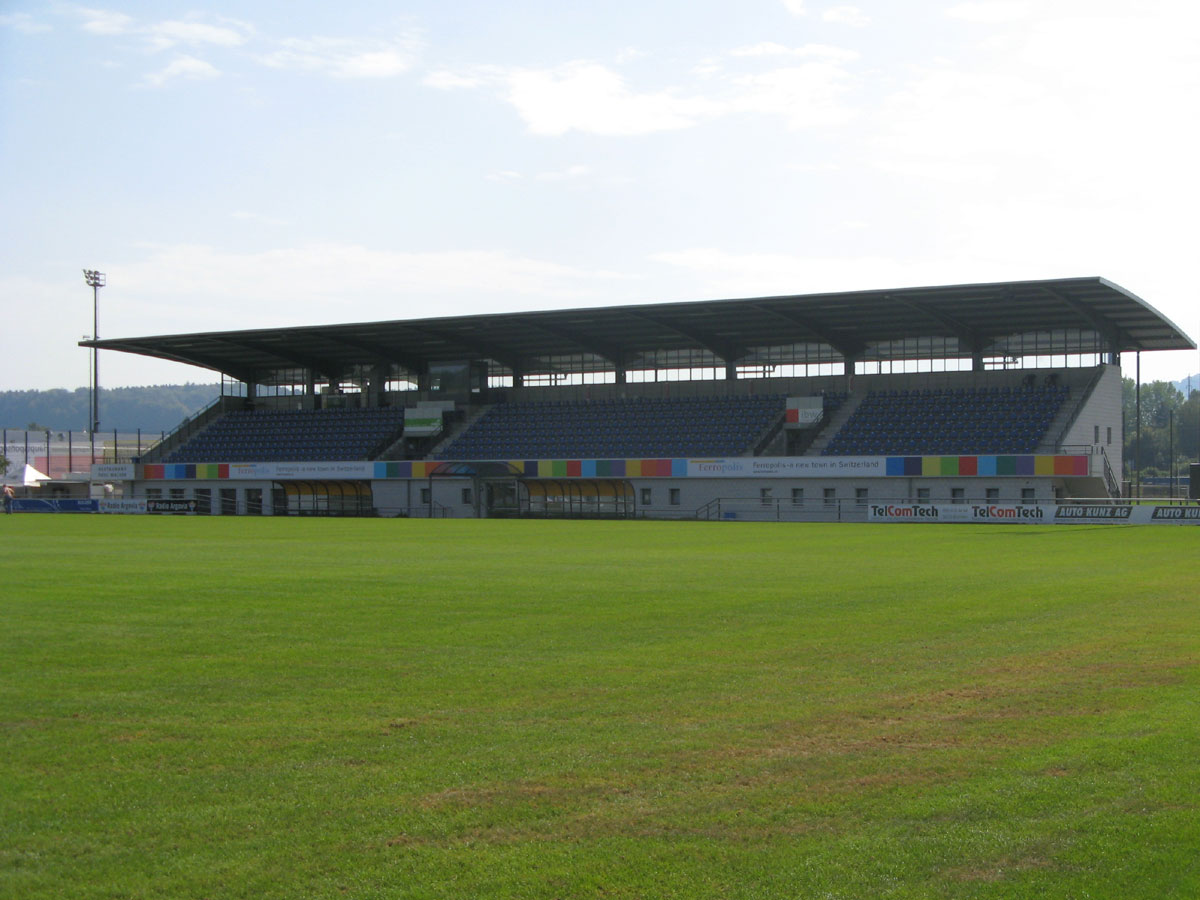
- Interactive map of Niedermatten
- Location: Wohlen
- Capacity: 3,734

Tenants
- FC Wohlen

Stadion Niedermatten is a football stadium in Wohlen, Switzerland. It is the home ground of FC Wohlen. The stadium is owned by Wohlen council. It has a capacity of 3,734 of which it has 3,100 standing places and 634 seats.

The stadium is part of the Niedermatten Sports Centre. It includes, apart from the football stadium, one athletics facility with 400-meter running track, an inline hockey court, two football training pitches and nine tennis courts . Construction began in August 2002 and was completed in spring 2004.
